= List of butterflies of Bangladesh =

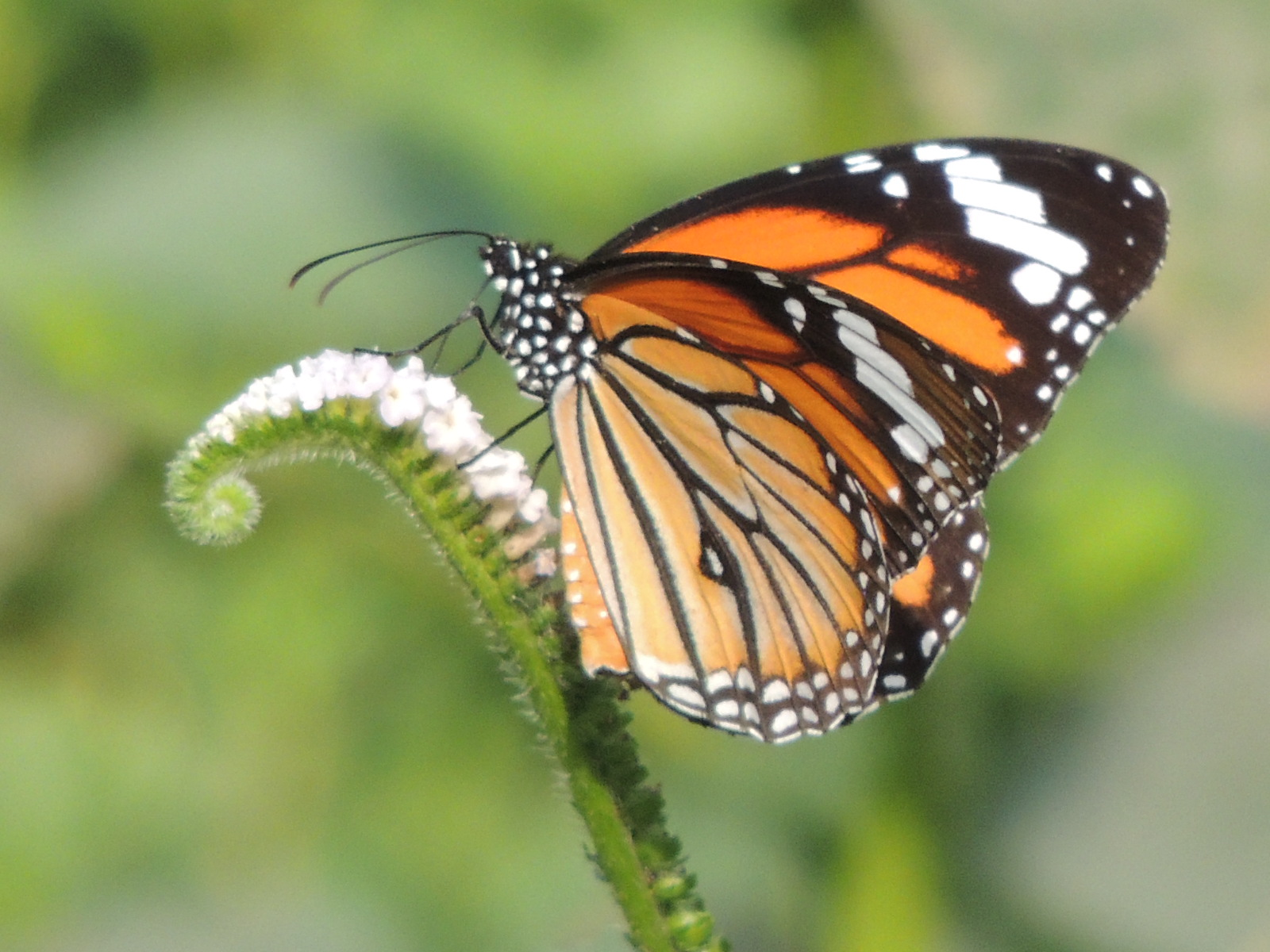
Danaus genutia in Dhaka

Location of Bangladesh

This is a list of butterflies of Bangladesh. About 430 species are known from Bangladesh, but it is estimated that a total number of 500 to 550 species occurs.

== Papilionidae ==
=== Papilioninae ===
- Troides helena cerberus Felder & Felder, 1865
- Troides aeacus aeacus Felder & Felder, 1860
- Pachliopta aristolochiae aristolochiae Fabricius, 1775
- Pachliopta hector Linné, 1758
- Losaria coon cacharensis Butler, 1885
- Atrophaneura varuna astorion Westwood, 1842
- Atrophaneura nevilli Wood-Mason, 1882
- Papilio demoleus demoleus Linné, 1758
- Papilio helenus helenus Linné, 1758
- Papilio chaon Westwood, 1845
- Papilio polytes romulus Cramer, 1775
- Papilio alcmenor alcmenor Felder & Felder, 1864
- Papilio castor castor Westwood, 1842
- Papilio protenor euprotenor Fruhstorfer, 1908
- Papilio memnon agenor Linné, 1758
- Papilio polymnestor polymnestor Cramer, 1775
- Papilio elephenor Doubleday, 1845
- Papilio paris paris Linné, 1758
- Papilio palinurus palinurus Fabricius, 1787
- Papilio crino Fabricius, 1793
- Chilasa slateri slateri Hewitson, 1857
- Chilasa clytia clytia Linné, 1758
- Chilasa paradoxa telearchus Hewitson, 1852
- Graphium doson axion Felder & Felder, 1864
- Graphium eurypylus cheronus Jordan, 1909
- Graphium chironides chironides Honrath, 1884
- Graphium agamemnon agamemnon Linné, 1758
- Graphium sarpedon sarpedon Linné, 1758
- Paranticopsis macareus indicus Rothschild, 1895
- Paranticopsis xenocles xenocles Doubleday, 1842
- Pathysa nomius swinhoei Moore, 1878
- Pathysa aristeus anticrates Doubleday, 1846
- Pathysa antipathes pompilius Fabricius, 1787
- Pathysa agetes agetes Westwood, 1843
- Lamproptera curius curius Fabricius, 1787

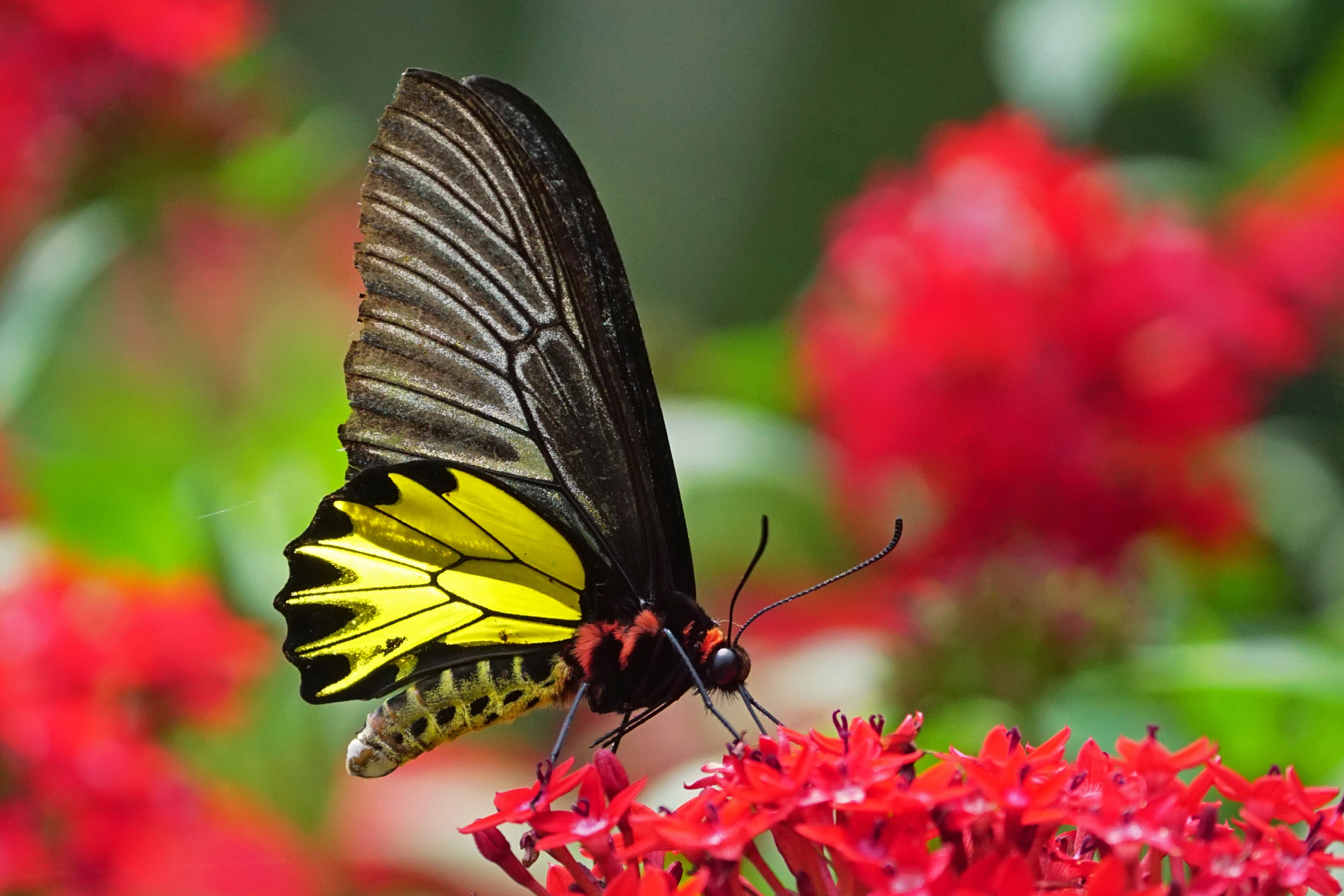
Golden birdwing, the largest butterfly of Bangladesh

== Pieridae ==
=== Coliadinae ===
- Gandaca harina assamica Moore, 1906
- Catopsilia pomona pomona Fabricius, 1775
- Catopsilia pyranthe pyranthe Linné, 1758
- Eurema blanda silhetana Wallace, 1867
- Eurema hecabe hecabe Linné, 1758
- Eurema andersoni jordani Corbet & Pendlebury, 1932
- Eurema brigitta rubella Wallace, 1867
- Eurema laeta sikkima Moore, 1906

=== Pierinae ===
- Ixias marianne Cramer, 1779
- Ixias pyrene latifasciata Butler, 1871
- Hebomoia glaucippe glaucippe Linné, 1758
- Cepora nerissa nerissa Fabricius, 1775
- Cepora nadina nadina Lucas, 1852
- Pieris brassicae brassicae Linné, 1758
- Artogeia canidia indica Evans, 1926
- Belenois aurota Fabricius, 1793
- Appias indra indra Moore, 1857
- Appias lalage lalage Doubleday, 1842
- Appias lyncida eleonora Boisduval, 1836
- Appias olferna olferna Swinhoe, 1890
- Appias albina darada Felder & Felder, 1865
- Appias paulina adamsoni Moore, 1905
- Appias nero galba Wallace, 1867
- Prioneris philonome clemanthe Doubleday, 1842
- Prioneris thestylis thestylis Doubleday, 1842
- Pareronia hippia hippia Fabricius, 1787
- Leptosia nina nina Fabricius, 1793
- Delias eucharis Drury, 1773
- Delias hyparete indica Wallace, 1867
- Delias descombesi descombesi Boisduval, 1836
- Delias pasithoe pasithoe Linné, 1767

== Lycaenidae ==
=== Miletinae ===
- Miletus chinensis assamensis Doherty, 1891
- Allotinus unicolor continentalis Fruhstorfer, 1913
- Allotinus drumila drumila Moore, 1866
- Allotinus taras Doherty, 1889
- Logania distanti massalia Doherty, 1891
- Taraka hamada mendesia Fruhstorfer, 1918
- Spalgis epeus epeus Westwood, 1851

=== Poritiinae ===
- Poritia hewitsoni hewitsoni Moore, 1866

=== Curetinae ===
- Curetis thetis thetis Drury, 1773
- Curetis saronis gloriosa Moore, 1883
- Curetis cf saronis Moore, 1877
- Curetis bulis bulis Westwood, 1851
- Curetis acuta dentata Moore, 1879

=== Aphnaeinae ===
- Cigaritis lohita himalayanus (Moore, 1884)
- Cigaritis vulcanus vulcanus (Fabricius, 1775)
- Cigaritis syama peguanus (Moore, 1884)
- Cigaritis ictis (Hewitson, 1865)
- Cigaritis elima elima (Moore, 1877)

=== Theclinae ===
- Arhopala camdeo Moore, 1857
- Arhopala athada apha de Nicéville, 1895
- Arhopala silhetensis silhetensis Hewitson, 1862
- Arhopala oenea Hewitson, 1869
- Arhopala khamti Doherty, 1891
- Arhopala atrax Hewitson, 1867
- Arhopala bazaloides bazaloides Hewitson, 1878
- Arhopala amantes apella Swinhoe, 1886
- Arhopala singla de Nicéville, 1885
- Arhopala bazalus teesta de Nicéville, 1886
- Arhopala eumolphus eumolphus Cramer, 1780
- Arhopala hellenore hellenore Doherty, 1889
- Arhopala centaurus pirithous Moore, 1883
- Arhopala agaba agaba Hewitson, 1862
- Arhopala perimuta perimuta Moore, 1858
- Flos diardi diardi Hewitson, 1862
- Flos apidanus ahamus Doherty, 1891
- Mahathala ameria ameria Hewitson, 1862
- Surendra quercetorum Moore, 1857
- Amblypodia anita anita Hewitson, 1862
- Iraota timoleon timoleon Stoll, 1790
- Zesius chrysomallus Hübner, 1823
- Catapaecilma major major Druce, 1895
- Loxura atymnus continentalis Fruhstorfer, 1911
- Yasoda tripunctata Hewitson, 1869
- Drina donina donina Hewitson, 1865
- Eooxylides tharis tharis Hübner, 1837
- Rathinda amor Fabricius, 1775
- Horaga onyx onyx Moore, 1858
- Horaga syrinx sikkima Moore, 1883
- Horaga albimacula viola Moore, 1882
- Cheritra freja evansi Cowan, 1965
- Ticherra acte acte Moore, 1858
- Drupadia ravindra boisduvalii Moore, 1884
- Pratapa deva lila Moore, 1883
- Dacalana penicilligera de Nicéville, 1890
- Tajuria jehana jehana Moore, 1883
- Tajuria cippus cippus Fabricius, 1798
- Tajuria melastigma de Nicéville, 1887
- Charana cepheis de Nicéville, 1894
- Rachana jalindra indra Moore, 1883
- Creon cleobis cleobis Godart, 1823
- Remelana jangala ravata Moore, 1865
- Chliaria othona othona Hewitson, 1865
- Chliaria kina kina Hewitson, 1869
- Hypolycaena erylus himavantus Fruhstorfer, 1912
- Zeltus amasa amasa Hewitson, 1865
- Artipe eryx eryx Linné, 1771
- Deudorix epijarbas amatius Fruhstorfer, 1912
- Deudorix gaetulia de Nicéville, 1892
- Deudorix isocrates Fabricius, 1793
- Sinthusa chandrana grotei Moore, 1884
- Bindahara phocides phocides Fabricius, 1793
- Rapala manea schistacea Moore, 1879
- Rapala scintilla scintilla de Nicéville, 1890
- Rapala varuna orseis Hewitson, 1877
- Rapala nissa rectivitta Moore, 1879
- Rapala pheretima petosiris Hewitson, 1863
- Rapala dieneces dieneces Hewitson, 1878
- Rapala suffusa suffusa Moore, 1883
- Rapala iarbus sorya Kollar, 1848
- Araotes lapithis lapithis Moore, 1857

=== Polyommatinae ===
- Anthene lycaenina lycambes Hewitson, 1878
- Anthene emolus emolus Godart, 1824
- Nacaduba pactolus continentalis Fruhstorfer, 1916
- Nacaduba hermus nabo Fruhstorfer, 1916
- Nacaduba pavana vajuva Fruhstorfer, 1916
- Nacaduba berenice plumbeomicans Wood-Mason & de Nicéville, 1880
- Nacaduba kurava euplea Fruhstorfer, 1916
- Nacaduba beroe gythion Fruhstorfer, 1916
- Ionolyce helicon merguiana Moore, 1884
- Petrelaea dana de Nicéville, 1883
- Prosotas nora ardates Moore, 1875
- Prosotas pia marginata Tite, 1963
- Prosotas aluta coelestis Wood-Mason & de Nicéville, 1887
- Prosotas dubiosa indica Evans, 1925
- Prosotas lutea sivoka Evans, 1910
- Caleta decidia decidia Hewitson, 1876
- Caleta elna noliteia Fruhstorfer, 1918
- Discolampa ethion ethion Westwood, 1851
- Jamides pura pura Moore, 1886
- Jamides celeno celeno Cramer, 1775
- Jamides alecto eurysaces Fruhstorfer, 1916
- Jamides elpis pseudelpis Butler, 1879
- Jamides bochus bochus Stoll, 1782
- Lampides boeticus Linné, 1767
- Castalius rosimon Fabricius, 1775
- Tarucus callinara Butler, 1867
- Tarucus balkanicus nigra Bethune-Baker, 1918
- Tarucus venosus Evans, Moore, 1882
- Leptotes plinius Fabricius, 1793
- Zizeeria karsandra Moore, 1865
- Zizeeria otis otis Fabricius, 1787
- Pseudozizeeria maha maha Kollar, 1848
- Zizula hylax Fabricius, 1775
- Pithecops corvus correctus Cowan, 1965
- Azanus uranus Butler, 1866
- Azanus ubaldus Cramer, 1782
- Acytolepis puspa gisca Fruhstorfer, 1910
- Neopithecops zalmora zalmora Butler, 1870
- Megisba malaya sikkima Moore, 1884
- Euchrysops cnejus Fabricius, 1798
- Catochrysops strabo strabo Fabricius, 1793
- Catochrysops panormus exiguus Distant, 1886
- Luthrodes pandava (Horsfield, 1829)
- Chilades lajus lajus Stoll, 1870
- Freyeria putli (Kollar, 1844)
- Cupido lacturnus assamica (Tytler, 1915)

=== Lycaeninae ===
- Heliophorus epicles latilimbata Eliot, 1963

== Riodinidae ==
=== Nemeobiinae ===
- Abisara echerius suffusa Moore, 1882
- Zemeros flegyas flegyas Cramer, 1780
- Dodona eugenes venox Fruhstorfer, 1912
- Taxila haquinus fasciata Moore, 1878

== Nymphalidae ==
=== Libytheinae ===
- Libythea myrrha sanguinalis Fruhstorfer, 1898

=== Danainae ===
- Parantica agleoides agleoides Felder & Felder, 1860
- Parantica aglea melanoides Moore, 1883
- Parantica melaneus plataniston Fruhstorfer, 1910
- Tirumala limniace exoticus Gmélin, 1790
- Tirumala septentrionis septentrionis Butler, 1874
- Tirumala gautama Moore, 1877
- Danaus chrysippus chrysippus Linné, 1758
- Danaus genutia genutia Cramer, 1779
- Danaus melanippus indicus Fruhstorfer, 1899
- Euploea sylvester hopei Felder & Felder, 1865
- Euploea mulciber mulciber Cramer, 1777
- Euploea midamus rogenhoferi Felder & Felder, 1865
- Euploea klugii klugii Moore, 1858
- Euploea algea deione Westwood, 1848
- Euploea core core Cramer, 1780
- Euploea crameri nicevillei Moore, 1890
- Euploea doubledayi doubledayi Felder & Felder, 1865
- Euploea radamanthus radamanthus Fabricius, 1793
- Idea agamarschana arrakana Fruhstorfer, 1910

=== Satyrinae ===
- Melanitis leda leda Linné, 1758
- Melanitis phedima bela Moore, 1857
- Orinoma damaris Gray, 1846
- Ethope himachala Moore, 1857
- Penthema lisarda lisarda Doubleday, 1845
- Elymnias hypermnestra undularis Drury, 1773
- Elymnias penanga chelensis de Nicéville, 1890
- Elymnias nesaea timandra Wallace, 1869
- Elymnias malelas malelas Hewitson, 1865
- Elymnias patna patna Westwood, 1851
- Elymnias vasudeva deva Moore, 1893
- Lethe vindhya vindhya C. Felder, 1859
- Lethe mekara zuchara Fruhstorfer, 1911
- Lethe europa niladana Fruhstorfer, 1911
- Lethe rohria rohria Fabricius, 1787
- Mycalesis francisca sanatana Moore, 1857
- Mycalesis anaxias aemate Fruhstorfer, 1911
- Mycalesis gotama charaka Moore, 1874
- Mycalesis perseus blasius Fabricius, 1798
- Mycalesis mineus mineus Linné, 1767
- Mycalesis intermedia Moore, 1891
- Mycalesis visala visala Moore, 1857
- Mycalesis suaveolens suaveolens Wood-Mason & de Nicéville, 1883
- Mycalesis malsarida Butler, 1868
- Mycalesis malsara Moore, 1857
- Orsotriaena medus medus Fabricius, 1775
- Erites falcipennis falcipennis Wood-Mason & de Nicéville, 1883
- Ragadia crisilda crisilda Hewitson, 1862
- Ypthima inica Hewitson, 1864
- Ypthima huebneri Kirby, 1871
- Ypthima baldus baldus Fabricius, 1775

=== Morphinae ===
- Thaumantis diores diores Doubleday, 1845
- Discophora sondaica zal Westwood, 1851
- Discophora timora timora Westwood, 1850
- Stichopthalma camadeva camadevoides de Nicéville, 1899
- Amathuxidia amythaon amythaon Doubleday, 1847

=== Apaturinae ===
- Rohana parisatis parisatis Westwood, 1850
- Dilipa morgiana Westwood, 1850
- Euripus nyctelius nyctelius Doubleday, 1845

=== Charaxinae ===
- Charaxes psaphon imna Butler, 1870
- Charaxes bernardus Felder & Felder, 1867
- Charaxes marmax marmax Westwood, 1848
- Charaxes kahruba kahruba Moore, 1896
- Charaxes solon sulphureus Rothschild & Jordan, 1898
- Polyura athamas athamas Drury, 1770
- Polyura arja Felder & Felder, 1867
- Polyura delphis delphis Doubleday, 1843
- Polyura schreiber assamensis Rothschild, 1899

=== Heliconiinae ===
- Acraea violae Fabricius, 1775
- Cethosia cyane cyane Drury, 1773
- Cethosia biblis tisamena Fruhstorfer, 1912
- Phalanta phalantha phalantha Drury, 1770
- Phalanta alcippe alcippoides Moore, 1899
- Cirrochroa tyche mithila Moore, 1872
- Vagrans sinha sinha Kollar, 1848
- Cupha erymanthis lotis Sulzer, 1776
- Vindula erota erota Fabricius, 1793
- Argynnis hyperbius hyperbius (Linnaeus, 1763)

=== Limenitidinae ===
- Dophla evelina derma Kollar, 1848
- Bassarona teuta teuta Doubleday, 1848
- Lexias dirtea khasiana Swinhoe, 1893
- Lexias cyanipardus cyanipardus Butler, 1869
- Euthalia lubentina indica Fruhstorfer, 1904
- Euthalia aconthea garuda Moore, 1857
- Euthalia alpheda jama Felder & Felder, 1867
- Euthalia anosia anosia Moore, 1857
- Euthalia monina kesava Moore, 1859
- Euthalia telchinia Ménétriés, 1857
- Euthalia phemius Doubleday, 1849
- Tanaecia julii appiades Ménétriés, 1857
- Tanaecia lepidea lepidea Butler, 1868
- Tanaecia jahnu jahnu Moore, 1857
- Symphaedra nais Forster, 1771
- Lebadea martha martha Fabricius, 1778
- Parthenos sylvia gambrisius Fabricius, 1787
- Neurosigma siva siva Westwood, 1850
- Athyma perius perius Linné, 1758
- Athyma asura asura Moore, 1858
- Athyma pravara acutipennis Fruhstorfer, 1906
- Athyma kanwa phorkys Fruhstorfer, 1912
- Athyma inara inara Westwood, 1850
- Athyma ranga ranga Moore, 1857
- Athyma selenophora bahula Moore, 1858
- Sumalia daraxa daraxa Doubleday, 1848
- Moduza procris procris Cramer, 1777
- Pantoporia hordonia hordonia Stoll, 1790
- Pantoporia sandaka davidsoni Eliot, 1969
- Pantoporia paraka paraka Butler, 1879
- Lasippa tiga camboja Moore, 1879
- Lasippa viraja viraja Moore, 1872
- Neptis hylas kamarupa Moore, 1872
- Neptis sappho astola Moore, 1872
- Neptis clinia susruta Moore, 1872
- Neptis nata adipala Moore, 1872
- Neptis soma soma Moore, 1858
- Neptis jumbah jumbah Moore, 1857
- Neptis magadha khasiana Moore, 1872
- Neptis harita harita Moore, 1874
- Neptis nashona nashona Swinhoe, 1896
- Neptis miah miah Moore, 1857
- Phaedyma columella ophiana Moore, 1872

=== Cyrestinae ===
- Cyrestis thyodamas thyodamas Boisduval, 1836
- Chersonesia risa risa Westwood, 1848
- Pseudergolis wedah Kollar, 1844
- Stibochiona nicea nicea Gray, 1846
- Dichorragia nesimachus nesimachus Doyére, 1840

=== Biblidinae ===
- Ariadne merione tapestrina Moore, 1884
- Ariadne ariadne pallidior Fruhstorfer, 1899

=== Nymphalinae ===
- Hypolimnas misippus Linné, 1758
- Hypolimnas bolina bolina Linné, 1758
- Junonia orithya ocyale Hübner, 1816
- Junonia hierta hierta Fabricius, 1793
- Junonia lemonias lemonias Linné, 1758
- Junonia almana almana Linné, 1758
- Junonia atlites atlites Linné, 1763
- Junonia iphita iphita Cramer, 1779
- Doleschallia bisaltide indica Moore, 1899
- Kallima inachus inachus Boisduval, 1836
- Rhinopalpa polynice birmana Fruhstorfer, 1897
- Vanessa cardui cardui Linné, 1758
- Symbrenthia lilaea khasiana Moore, 1874

== Hesperiidae ==
=== Coeliadinae ===
- Bibasis oedipodea belesis Mabille, 1876
- Bibasis harisa harisa Moore, 1865
- Bibasis iluska mahintha Moore, 1874
- Bibasis sena sena Moore, 1865
- Hasora chromus chromus Cramer, 1782
- Hasora taminatus bhavara Fruhstorfer, 1911
- Hasora khoda coulteri Wood-Mason & de Nicéville, 1887
- Hasora anura anura de Nicéville, 1889
- Hasora badra badra Moore, 1858
- Hasora vitta indica Evans, 1932
- Choaspes benjaminii formosanus Fruhstorfer, 1911
- Badamia exclamationis Fabricius, 1775

=== Pyrginae ===
- Capila phanaeus fiducia Evans, 1949
- Celaenorrhinus asmara consertus de Nicéville, 1890
- Celaenorrhinus leucocera Kollar, 1844
- Celaenorrhinus aurivittata aurivittata Moore, 1865
- Pseudocoladenia dan fabia Evans, 1949
- Coladenia indrani indrani Moore, 1865
- Sarangesa dasahara dasahara Moore, 1865
- Odontoptilum angulata angulata Felder, 1862
- Gerosis bhagava bhagava Moore, 1866
- Gerosis phisara phisara Moore, 1884
- Tagiades japetus ravi Moore, 1865
- Tagiades gana athos Plötz, 1884
- Tagiades litigiosa litigiosa Möschler, 1878
- Spialia galba galba Fabricius, 1793

=== Hesperiinae ===
- Astictopterus jama olivascens Moore, 1878
- Baracus vittatus septentrionum Wood-Mason & Nicéville, 1887
- Ampittia dioscorides dioscorides Fabricius, 1793
- Aeromachus pygmaeus pygmaeus Fabricius, 1793
- Halpe sikkima Moore, 1882
- Halpe porus Mabille, 1876
- Pithauria stramineipennis stramineipennis Wood-Mason & de Nicéville, 1887
- Pithauria marsena Hewitson, 1855
- Iambrix salsala salsala Moore, 1865
- Koruthaialos rubecula cachara Evans, 1949
- Sancus fuligo subfasciatus Moore, 1878
- Udaspes folus Cramer, 1775
- Ancistroides nigrita diocles Moore, 1865
- Notocrypta feisthamelii alysos Moore, 1865
- Notocrypta curvifascia curvifascia Felder, 1862
- Notocrypta paralysos asawa Fruhstorfer, 1911
- Scobura isota Swinhoe, 1893
- Suada swerga swerga de Nicéville, 1883
- Suastus gremius gremius Fabricius, 1798
- Suastus minuta aditia Evans, 1943
- Cupitha purreea Moore, 1877
- Hyarotis adrastus praba Moore, 1865
- Hyarotis microstictum microstictum Wood-Mason & de Nicéville, 1887
- Quedara monteithi monteithi Wood-Mason & de Nicéville, 1887
- Gangara thyrsis thyrsis Fabricius, 1775
- Erionota thrax thrax Linné, 1767
- Matapa aria Moore, 1865
- Matapa druna Moore, 1865
- Matapa cresta Evans, 1949
- Matapa sasivarna Moore, 1865
- Taractrocera maevius maevius Fabricius, 1893
- Oriens gola pseudolus Mabille, 1883
- Telicota colon stinga Evans, 1949
- Telicota besta besta Evans, 1949
- Telicota linna linna Evans, 1949
- Telicota bambusae bambusae Moore, 1878
- Potanthus trachala tytleri Evans, 1914
- Potanthus pseudomaesa clio Evans, 1932
- Potanthus confucius dushta Fruhstorfer, 1911
- Cephrenes chrysozona oceanica Mabille, 1904
- Parnara guttatus mangala Moore, 1865
- Parnara bada bada Moore, 1878
- Parnara ganga Evans, 1937
- Borbo cinnara Wallace, 1866
- Pseudoborbo bevani Moore, 1878
- Pelopidas sinensis Mabille, 1877
- Pelopidas agna agna Moore, 1865
- Pelopidas subochracea subochracea Moore, 1878
- Pelopidas mathias mathias Fabricius, 1798
- Pelopidas conjuncta conjuncta Herrich-Schäffer, 1869
- Pelopidas assamensis de Niceville, 1882
- Baoris farri farri Moore, 1878
- Baoris chapmani Evans, 1937
- Baoris unicolor Moore, 1883
- Caltoris brunnea caere de Nicéville, 1891
- Caltoris cahira austeni Moore, 1883
- Caltoris cormasa Hewitson, 1876
- Caltoris kumara moorei Evans, 1926
- Caltoris tulsi tulsi de Nicéville, 1883
- Iton semamora semamora Moore, 1866
