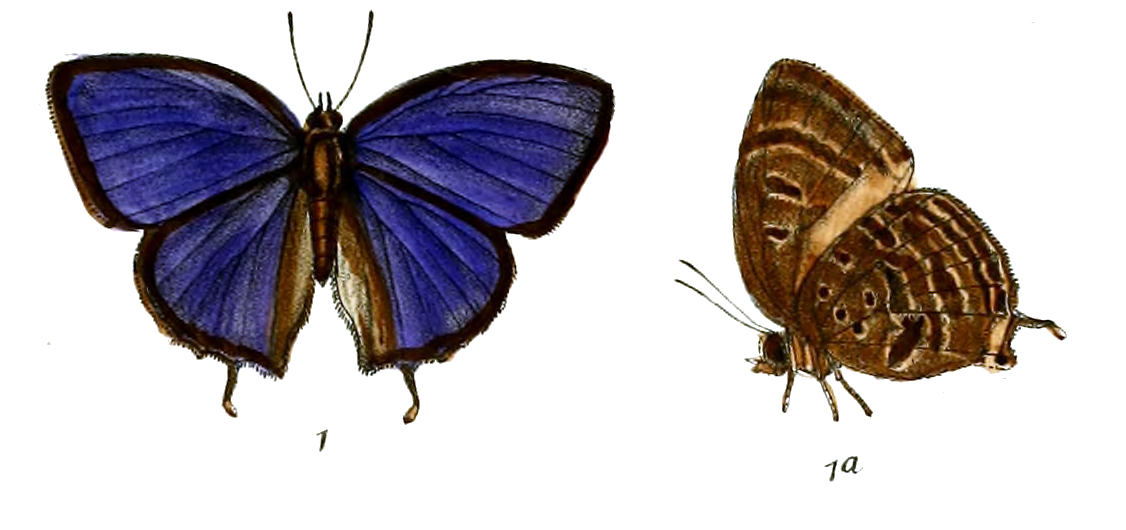
- Arhopala khamti in Lepidoptera Indica
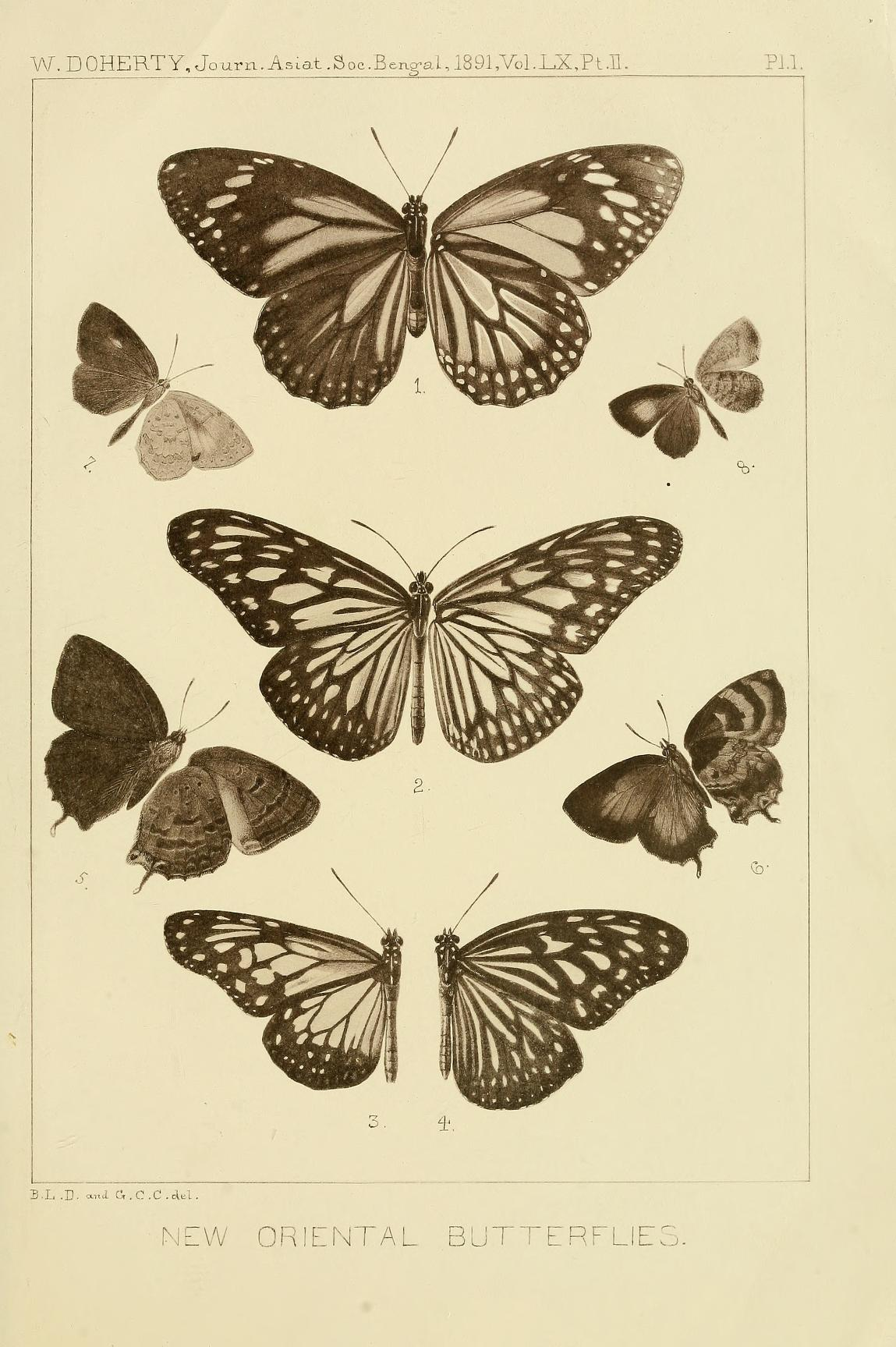
- Plate accompanying the original description.A. khamti is figure 5

Scientific classification
- Kingdom: Animalia
- Phylum: Arthropoda
- Clade: Pancrustacea
- Class: Insecta
- Order: Lepidoptera
- Family: Lycaenidae
- Genus: Arhopala
- Species: A. khamti

Binomial name
- Arhopala khamti Doherty, 1891

= Arhopala khamti =

Species of butterfly

Arhopala khamti, Doherty's dull oakblue, is a butterfly in the family Lycaenidae. It was described by William Doherty in 1891. It is found in the Indomalayan realm (Sikkim, Assam, Thailand, Hainan).

Very dark blue with a very narrow border: upper hindwing space 6 mostly blue. Below with a black tornal lobe and a more or less black spot alongside it this with metallic scales.Very similar to Arhopala oenea.
