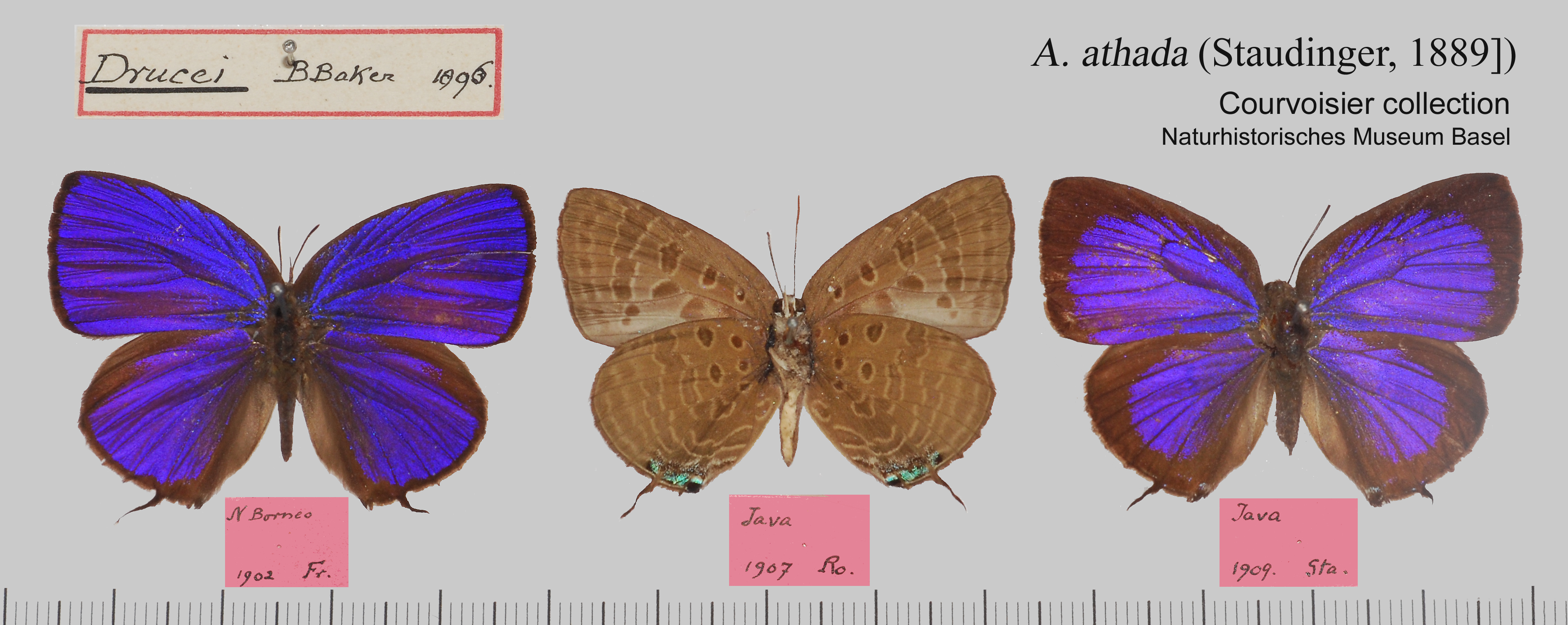

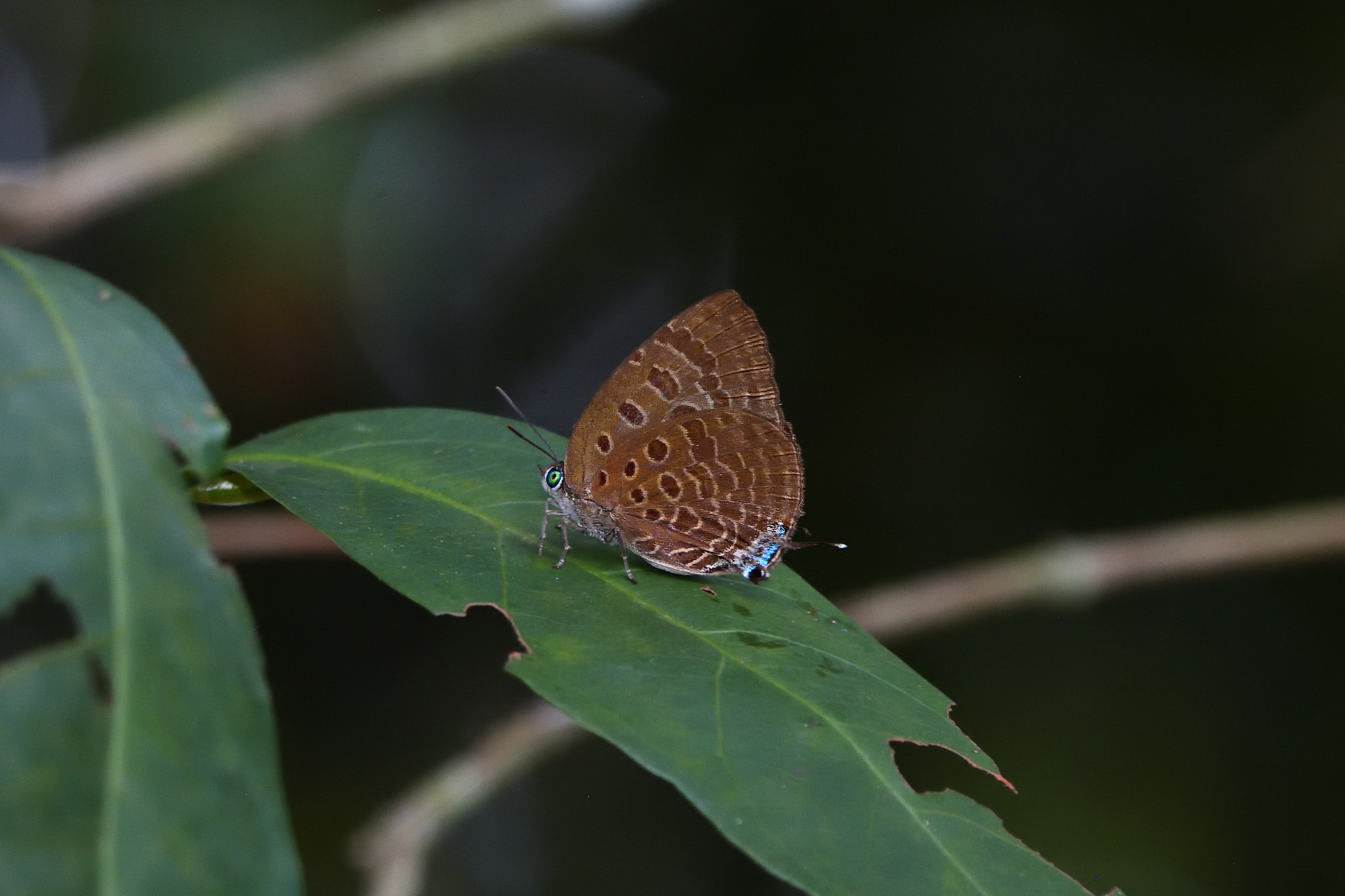

Scientific classification
- Kingdom: Animalia
- Phylum: Arthropoda
- Clade: Pancrustacea
- Class: Insecta
- Order: Lepidoptera
- Family: Lycaenidae
- Genus: Arhopala
- Species: A. athada

Binomial name
- Arhopala athada (Staudinger, 1889])

Synonyms
- Amblypodia athada Staudinger, 1889; Arhopala agamemnon Corbet, 1941; Arhopala drucei Bethune-Baker, 1896; Arhopala apha de Nicéville, 1895; Narathura athada wilemani Evans, 1957; Narathura cleander minor Evans, 1957; Arhopala athada baweana Eliot, 1972

= Arhopala athada =

Vinous oakblue

Species of butterfly

Arhopala athada, the vinous oakblue is a species of butterfly belonging to the lycaenid family described by Otto Staudinger in 1889. It is found in Southeast Asia - Singapore, Peninsular Malaya, Sumatra, Borneo, Bangka, Bawean (A. a. athada), Assam, Burma, Mergui, Thailand (A. a. apha de Nicéville, 1895) and the Philippines (A. a. wilemani (Evans, 1957)).

== Description ==
[drucei ] Above the male is deep dark ultramarine, with a black margin of 1.5 mm width, whilst in the female it is 4 mm broad. The upper surface, particularly in the shows a distinct lilac reflection.Subspecies apha is very similar to Arhopala adatha, but the under surface is more abundantly brown and with aflesh-coloured ground, whereas the spots and bands are darker. The upper surface is of a brighter and more lustrous blue, and the black margin is broader.

== Subspecies ==
- Arhopala athada athada (Singapore, Peninsular Malaysia, Sumatra, Borneo, Bangka, Bawean)
- Arhopala athada apha de Nicéville, 1895 (Assam, Burma, Mergui, Thailand)
- Arhopala athada wilemani (Evans, 1957) (Philippines: Mindanao)
- Arhopala athada minor (Evans, 1957) (Bachan)
- Arhopala athada baweana Eliot, 1972 (Bawean)
