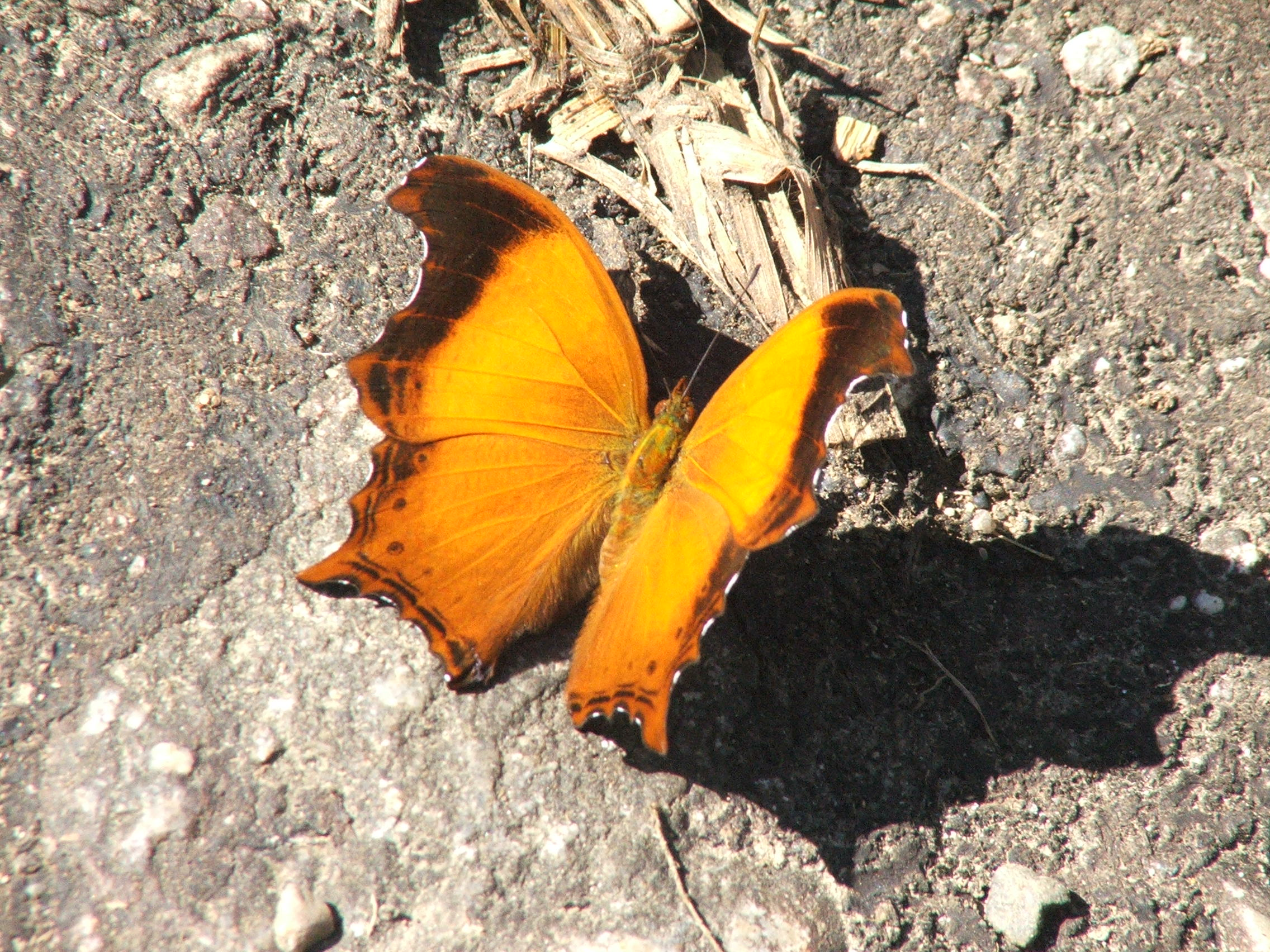

Scientific classification
- Kingdom: Animalia
- Phylum: Arthropoda
- Class: Insecta
- Order: Lepidoptera
- Family: Nymphalidae
- Tribe: Kallimini
- Genus: Rhinopalpa; C. & R. Felder, 1860
- Species: R. polynice

Binomial name
- Rhinopalpa polynice (Cramer, 1779)

= Rhinopalpa =

Wizard

Genus of butterflies

Rhinopalpa polynice, the wizard, is a nymphalid butterfly found in India and South Asia, and is the only species in the genus Rhinopalpa.

== Gallery ==
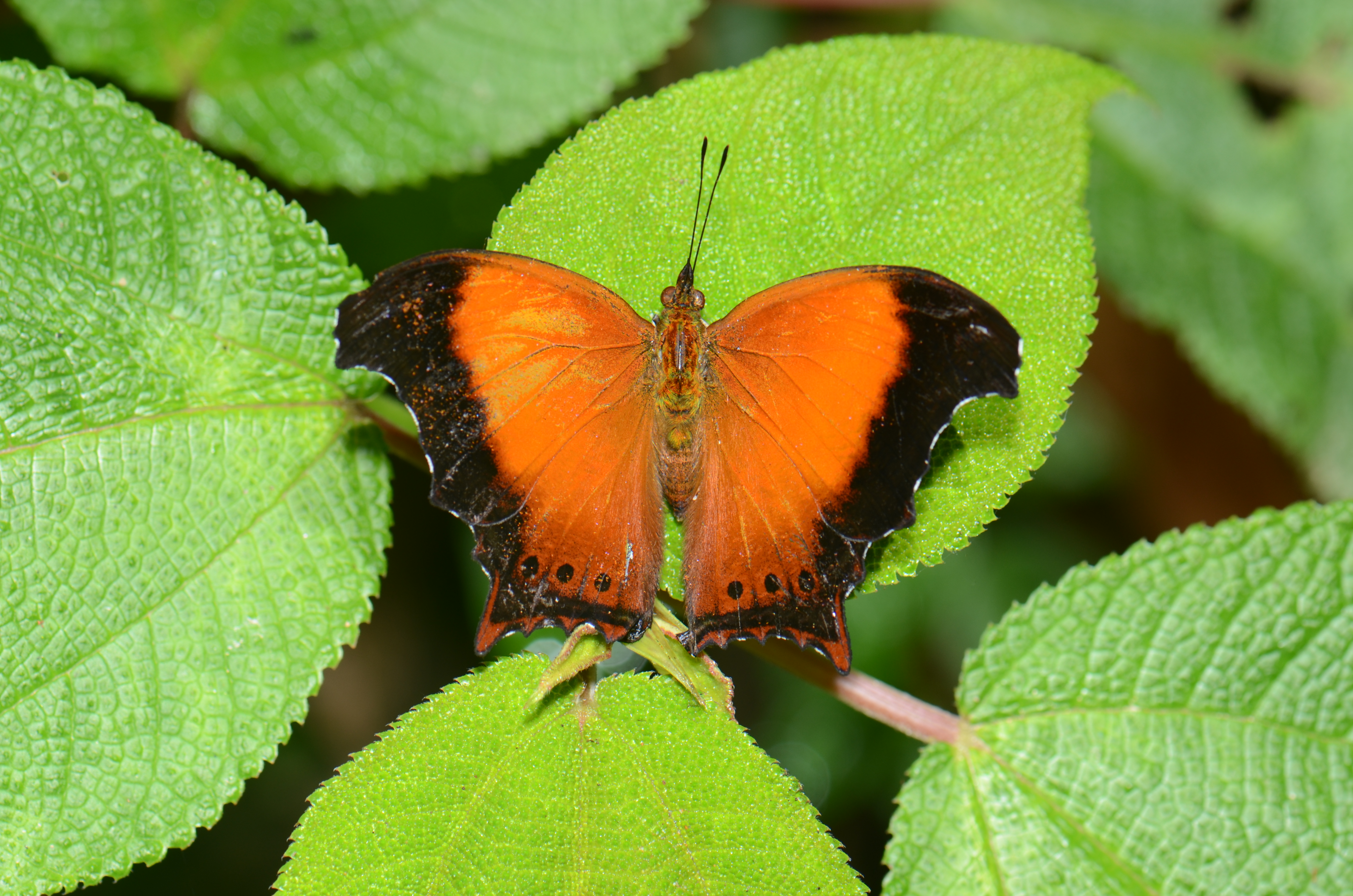
Upperside

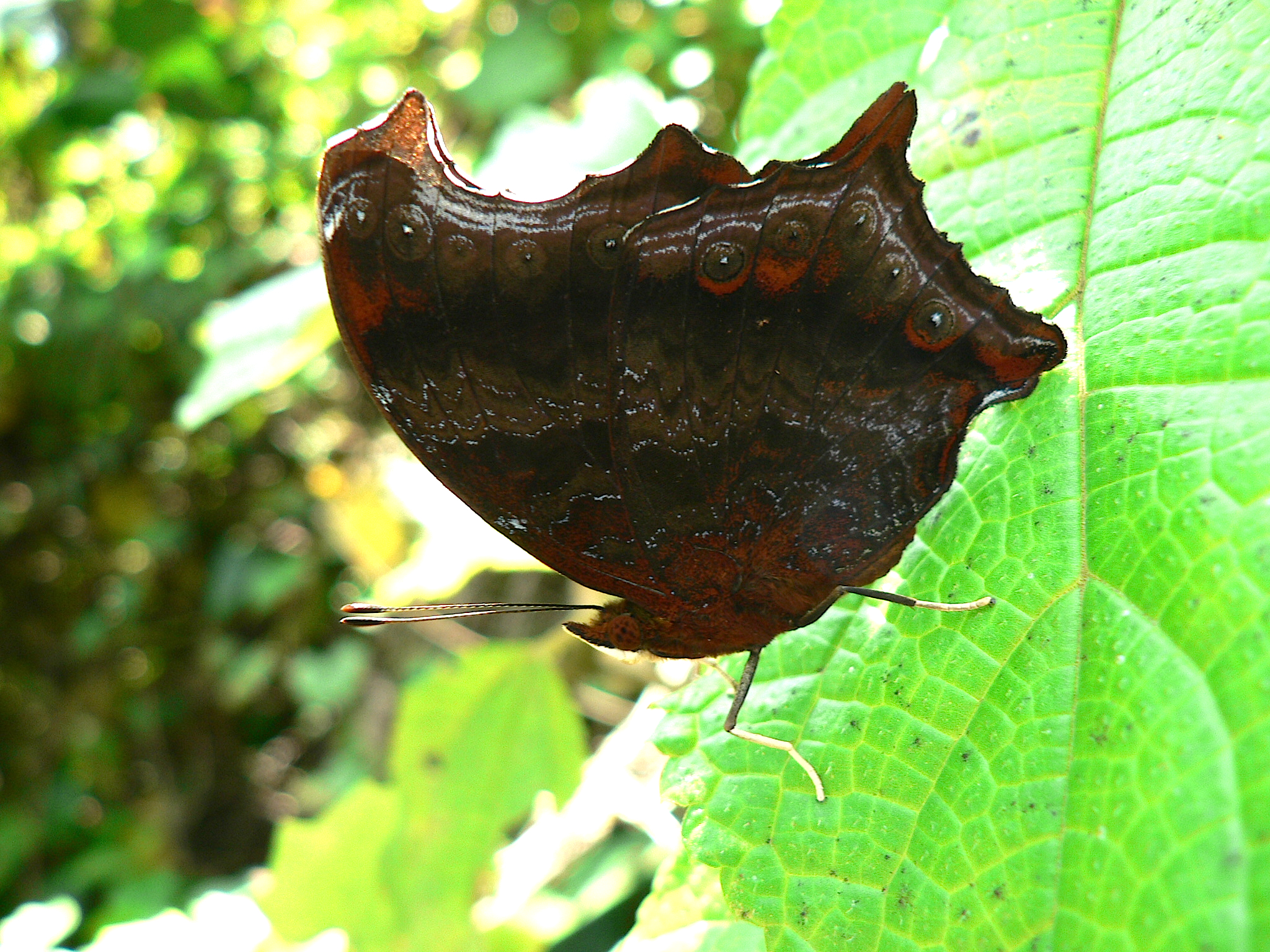
Underside

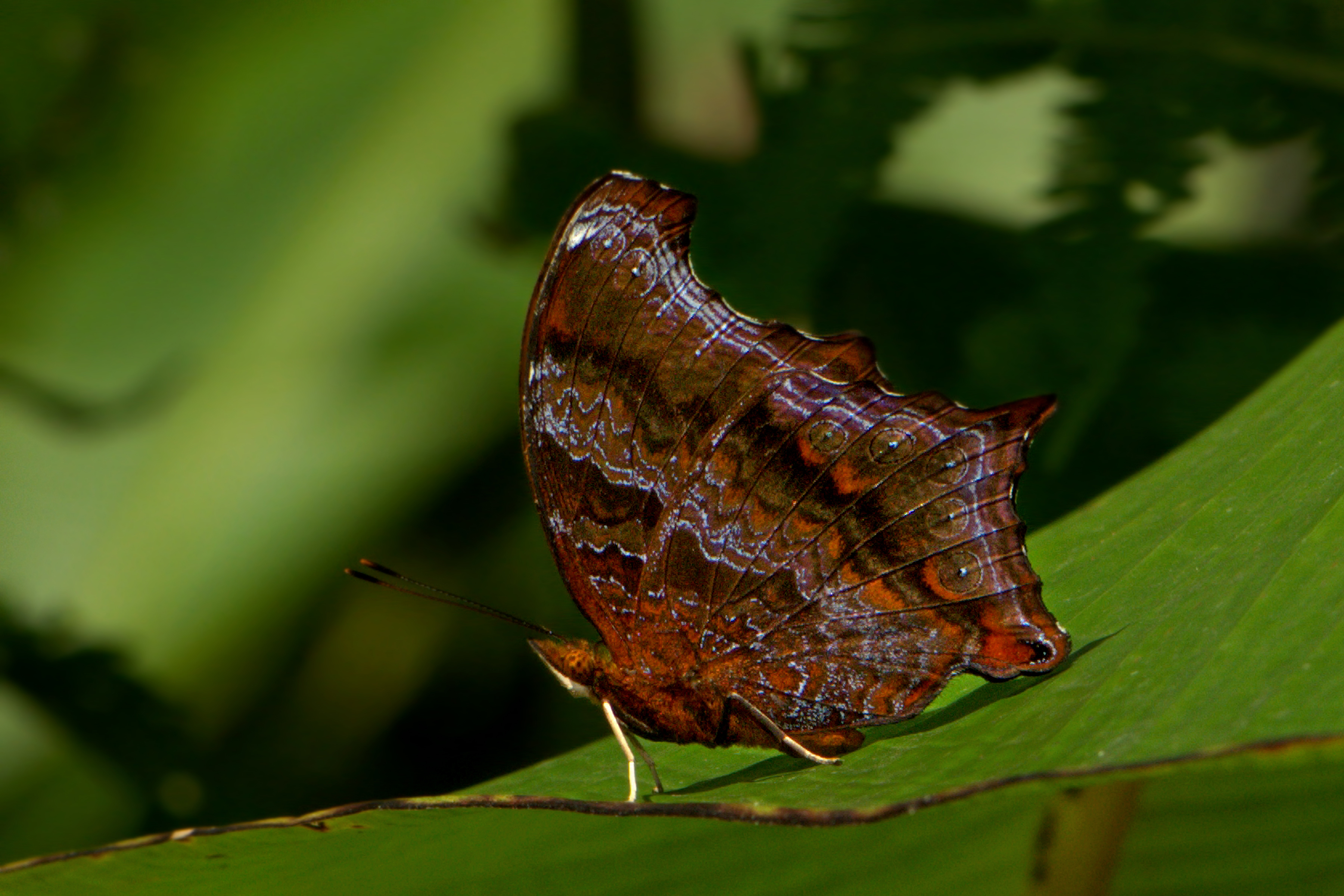

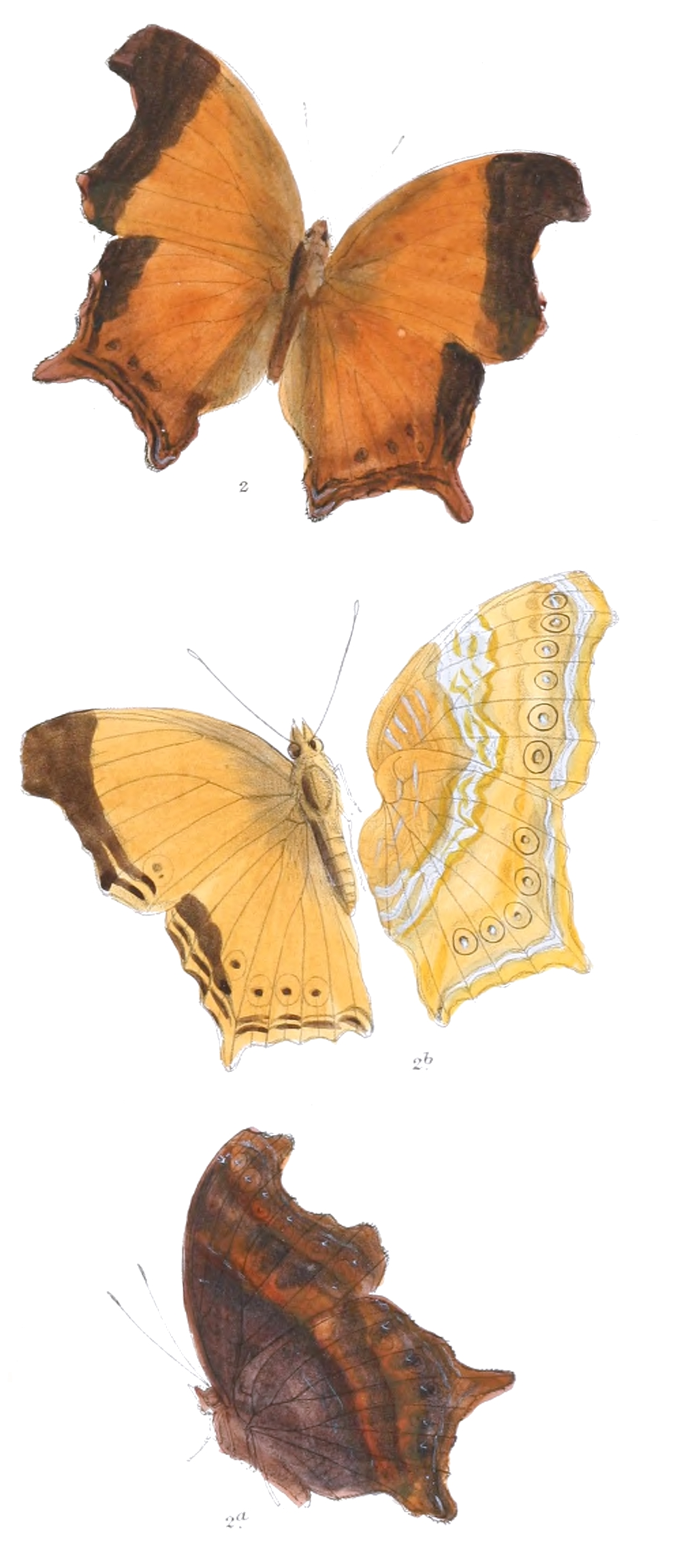
Male, female and underside

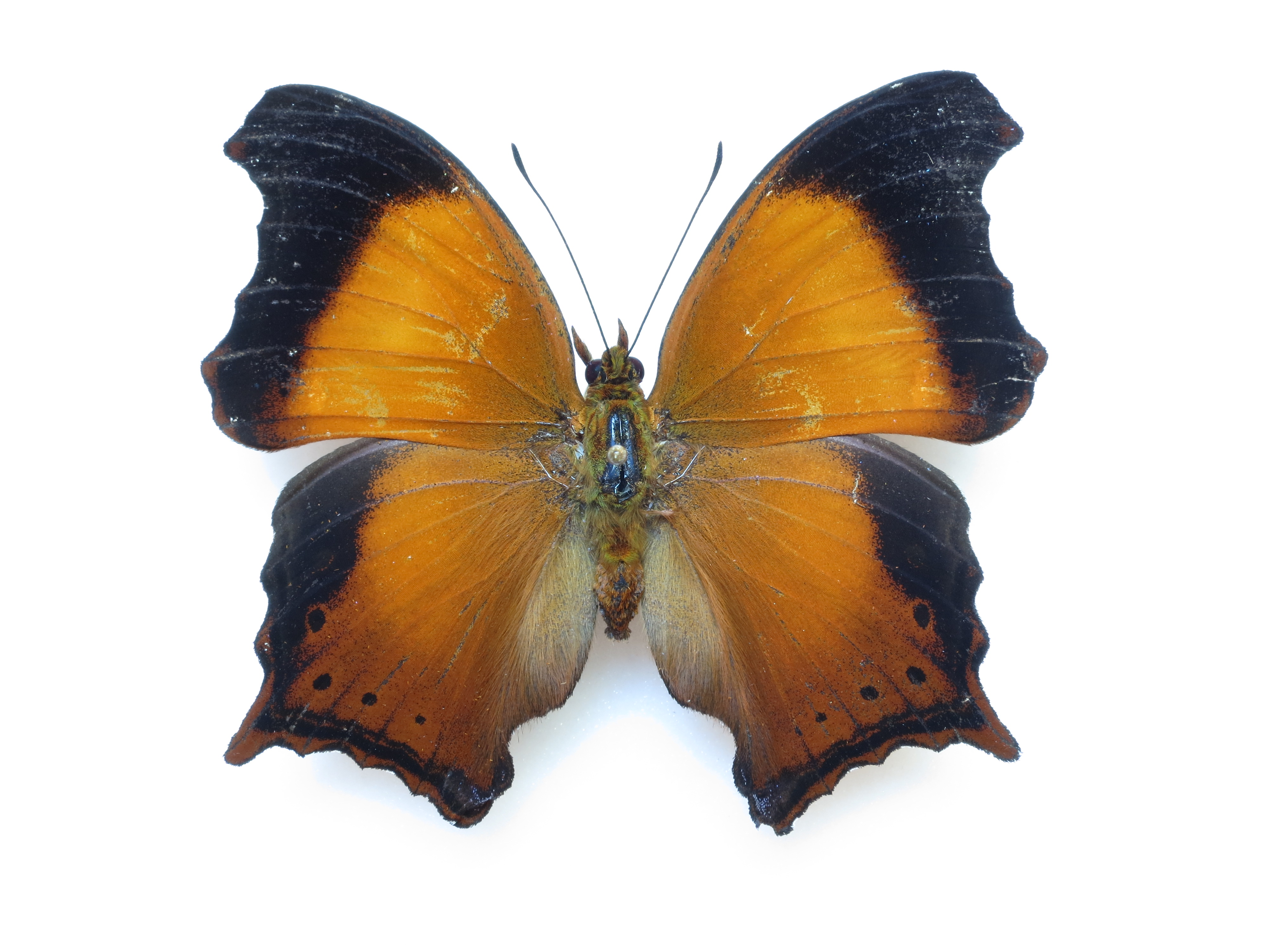
R. polynice birmana from Bình Thuận Province, Vietnam

== References and external links ==
- Rhinopalpa polynice at Tree of Life
