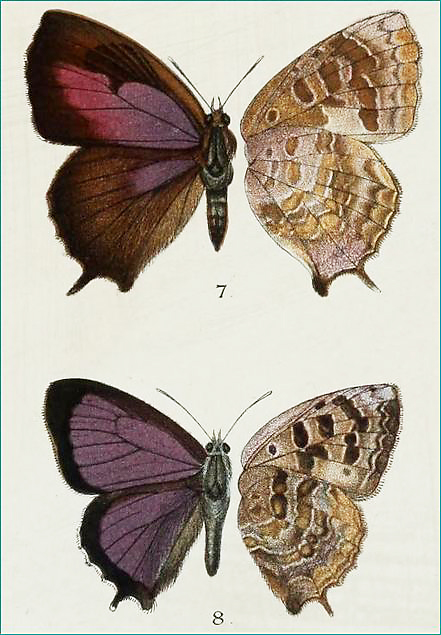
- Arhopala singla, female, male, Sikkim, from original description.

Scientific classification
- Kingdom: Animalia
- Phylum: Arthropoda
- Clade: Pancrustacea
- Class: Insecta
- Order: Lepidoptera
- Family: Lycaenidae
- Genus: Arhopala
- Species: A. singla

Binomial name
- Arhopala singla (de Nicéville, 1885)

= Arhopala singla =

Pointed oakblue

Species of butterfly

Arhopala singla, the pointed oakblue, is a butterfly in the family Lycaenidae. It was described by Charles Lionel Augustus de Nicéville in 1885. It is found in the Indomalayan realm (Northwest India, Bhutan, Nepal, Sikkim, Assam, Burma, and Southwest China).

== Description ==
Very closely allied to bazalus, beneath almost the same, but the forewing of the male exhibits a black cell-end spot and behind it another dentiform spot projecting into the blue disc. The female has in the forewing a large violettish-blue basal spot, but in the hindwing only traces of blue in the basal portion. Otherwise the female is the same as that of bazalus, but the singla are apparently much rarer.
