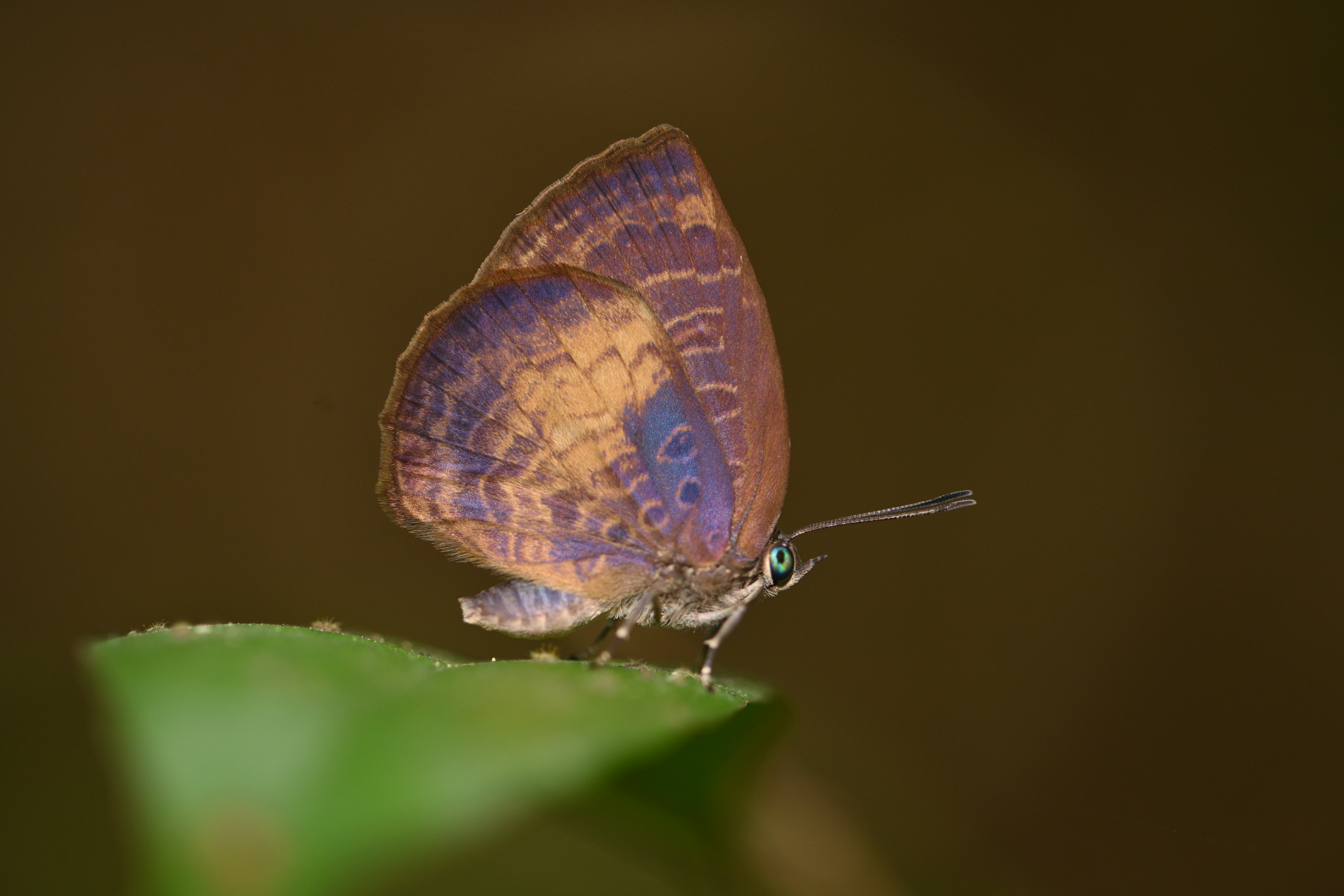

Scientific classification
- Kingdom: Animalia
- Phylum: Arthropoda
- Clade: Pancrustacea
- Class: Insecta
- Order: Lepidoptera
- Family: Lycaenidae
- Genus: Arhopala
- Species: A. perimuta

Binomial name
- Arhopala perimuta Moore, 1857

Synonyms
- Amblypodia perimuta Moore, [1858]; Arhopala regina Corbet, 1941; Arhopala linta Corbet, 1941; Amblypodia regia Evans, [1925]

= Arhopala perimuta =

Species of butterfly

Arhopala perimuta, the yellowdisc oakblue or yellowdisc tailless oakblue, is a species of butterfly belonging to the lycaenid family described by Frederic Moore in 1857. It is found in Southeast Asia (Sikkim to Assam, Burma, Thailand, Mergui and Peninsular Malaya).

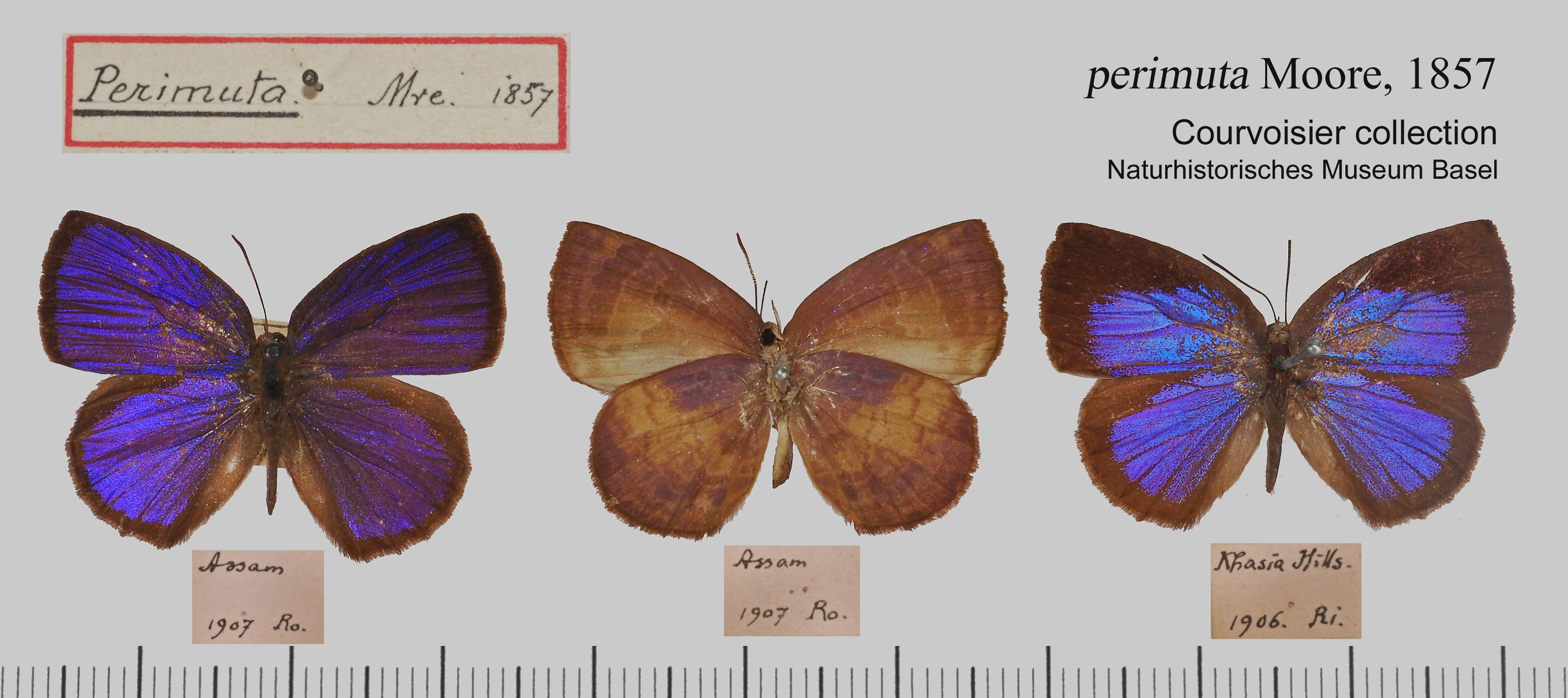

A. perimuta has been established as the type of a separate genus: Darasana Moore (1884), recognizable by the margin of the wings being on all sides rounded, whereby the tailless hindwing appears almost exactly oviform; only the apex of the forewing forms a slight point. Upper surface of male glaringly sky-blue with a black margin of about 1 mm width, under surface violettish-brown with dark, curved, almost parallel transverse lines.

== Subspecies ==
- Arhopala perimuta perimuta (Sikkim to Assam, northern Burma, central Burma, northern Thailand)
- Arhopala perimuta regina Corbet, 1941 (southern Burma, Mergui, southern Thailand, Peninsular Malaysia)
