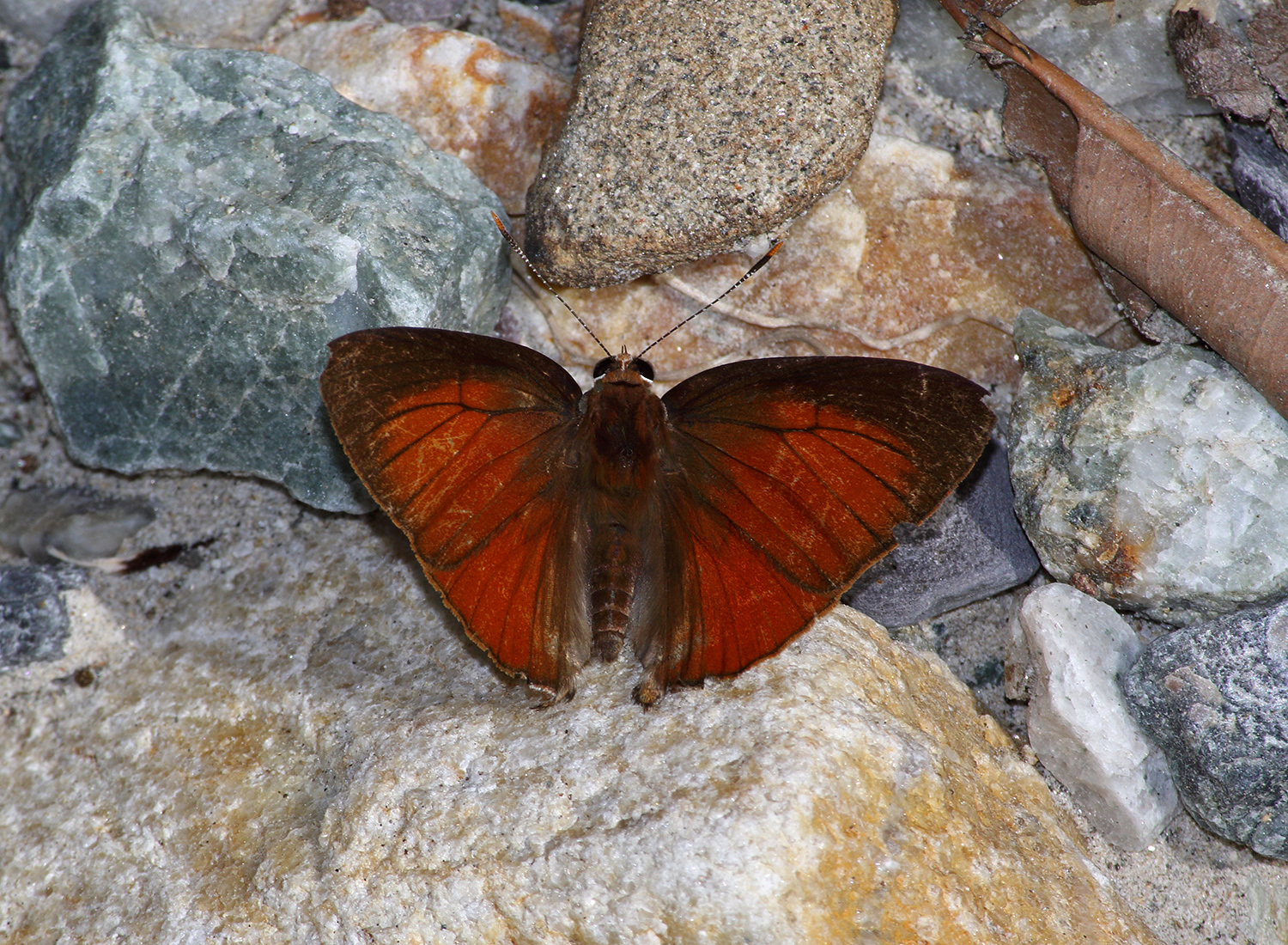

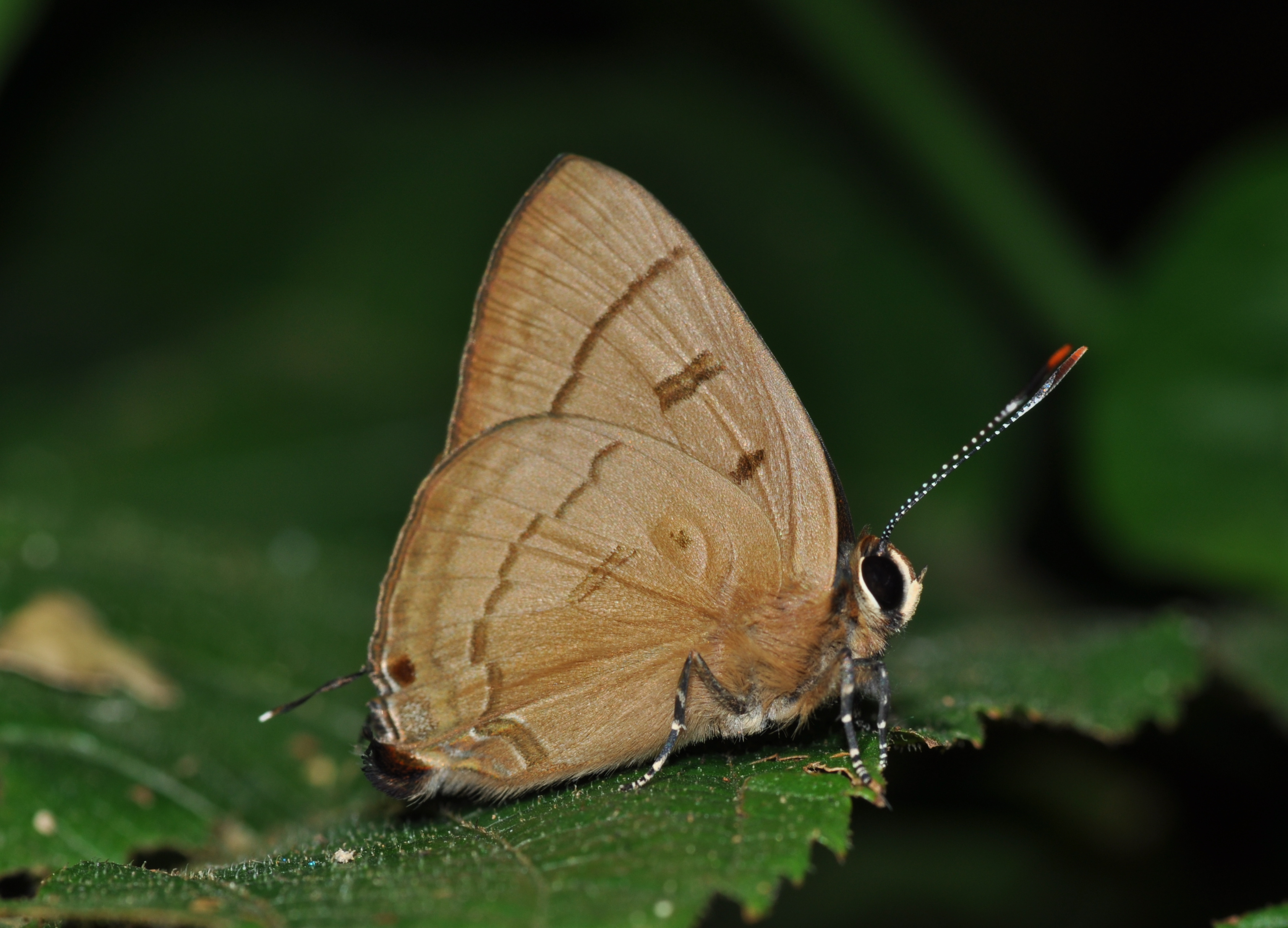

Scientific classification
- Kingdom: Animalia
- Phylum: Arthropoda
- Class: Insecta
- Order: Lepidoptera
- Family: Lycaenidae
- Genus: Rapala
- Species: R. pheretima

Binomial name
- Rapala pheretima (Hewitson, 1863.)

Synonyms
- Deudorix pheretima Hewitson, 1863; Deudorix sequeira Distant, 1885; Deudorix utimutis Distant, 1885

= Rapala pheretima =

Copper flash

Species of butterfly

Rapala pheretima, the copper flash, is a species of lycaenid or gossamer-winged butterfly found in the Indomalayan realm.

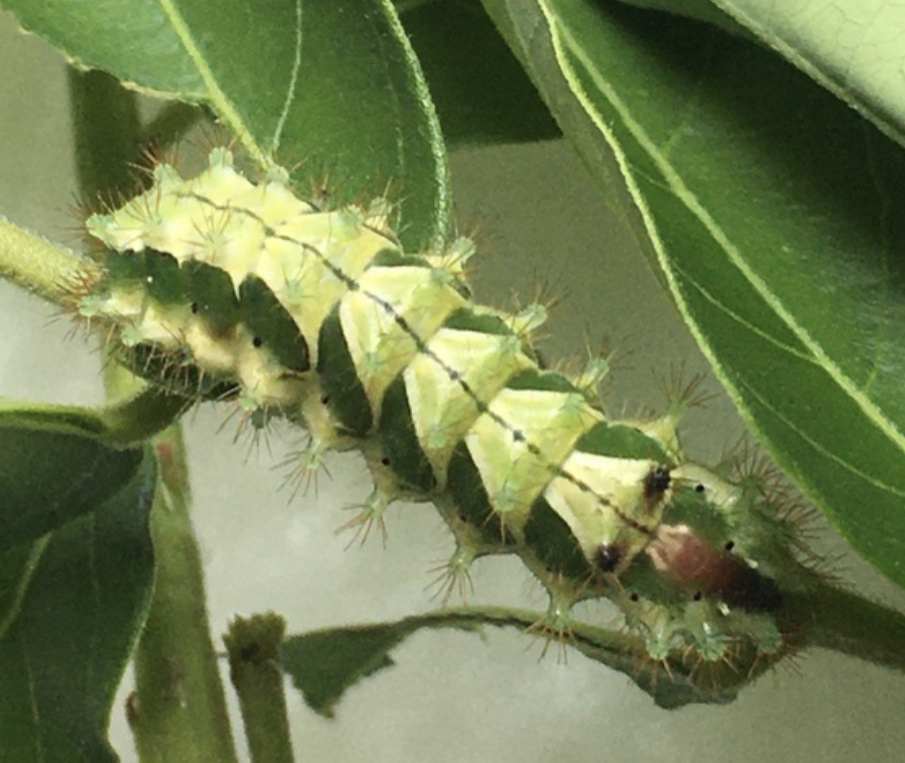
Caterpillar of Rapala pheretima sequeira eating Glochidion, probably Glochidion obscurus

== Subspecies ==
- Rapala pheretima pheretima (Borneo, Sumatra)
- Rapala pheretima petosiris (Hewitson, 1863) (Nepal, Sikkim, Assam to northern Thailand)
- Rapala pheretima sequeira (Distant, 1885) (southern Thailand, Burma, Peninsular Malaya, Langkawi, Singapore)
- Rapala pheretima tiomana Eliot, 1978 (Pulau Tioman)
- Rapala pheretima sakaia Fruhstorfer, 1912 (Java)
- Rapala pheretima guevara Fruhstorfer, 1912 (Borneo)
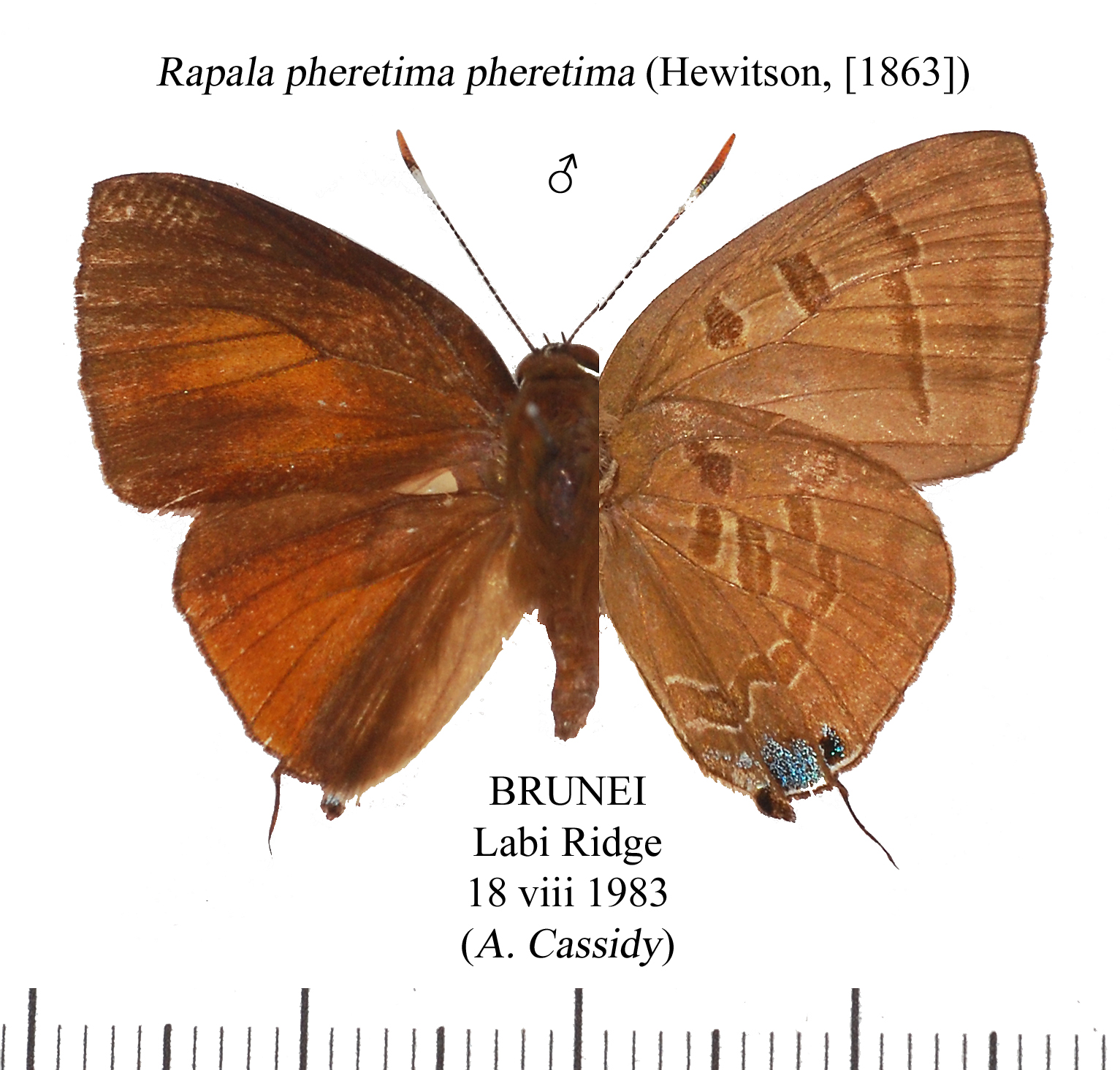
Rapala pheretima pheretima

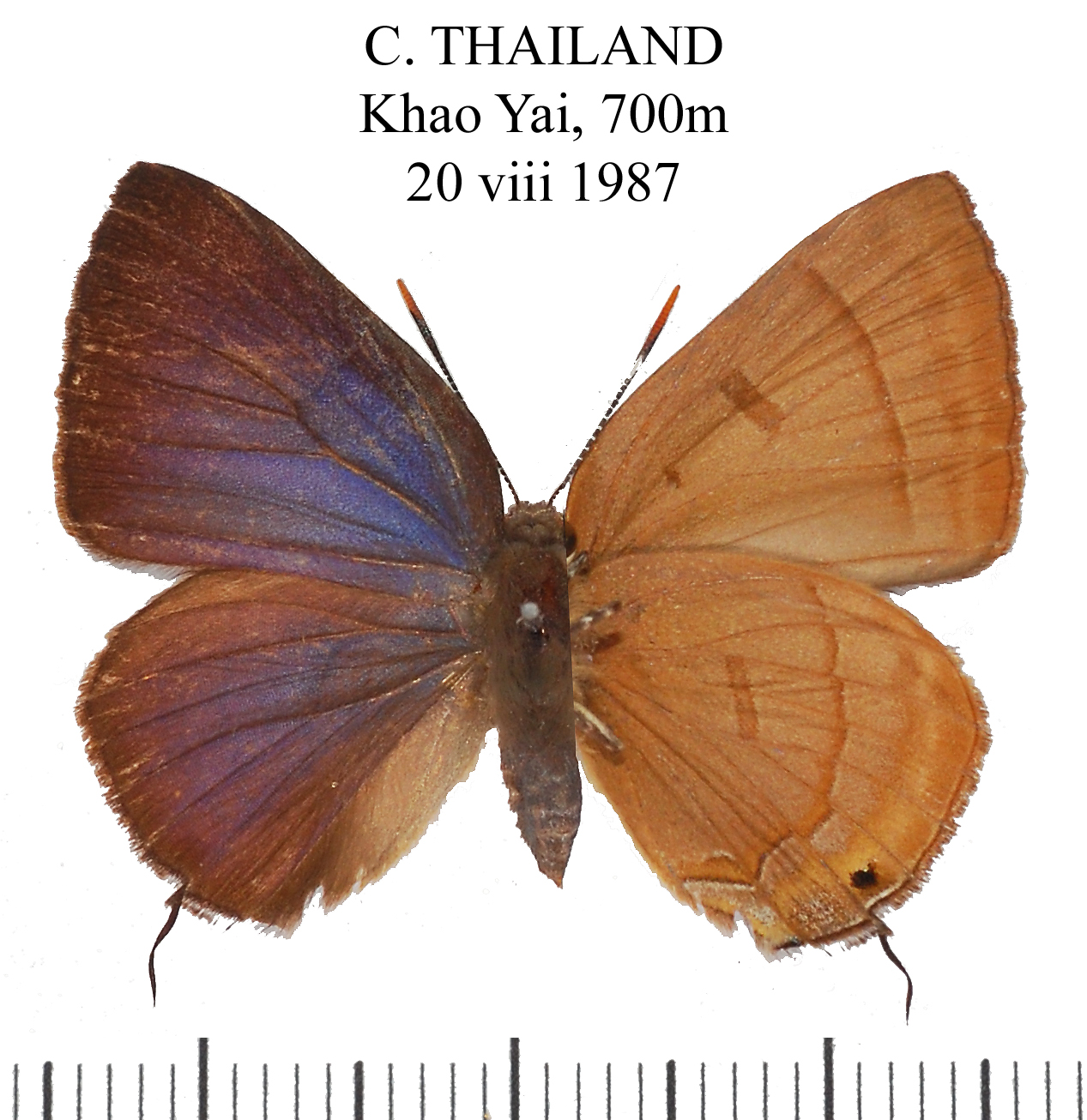
Rapala pheretima petosiris

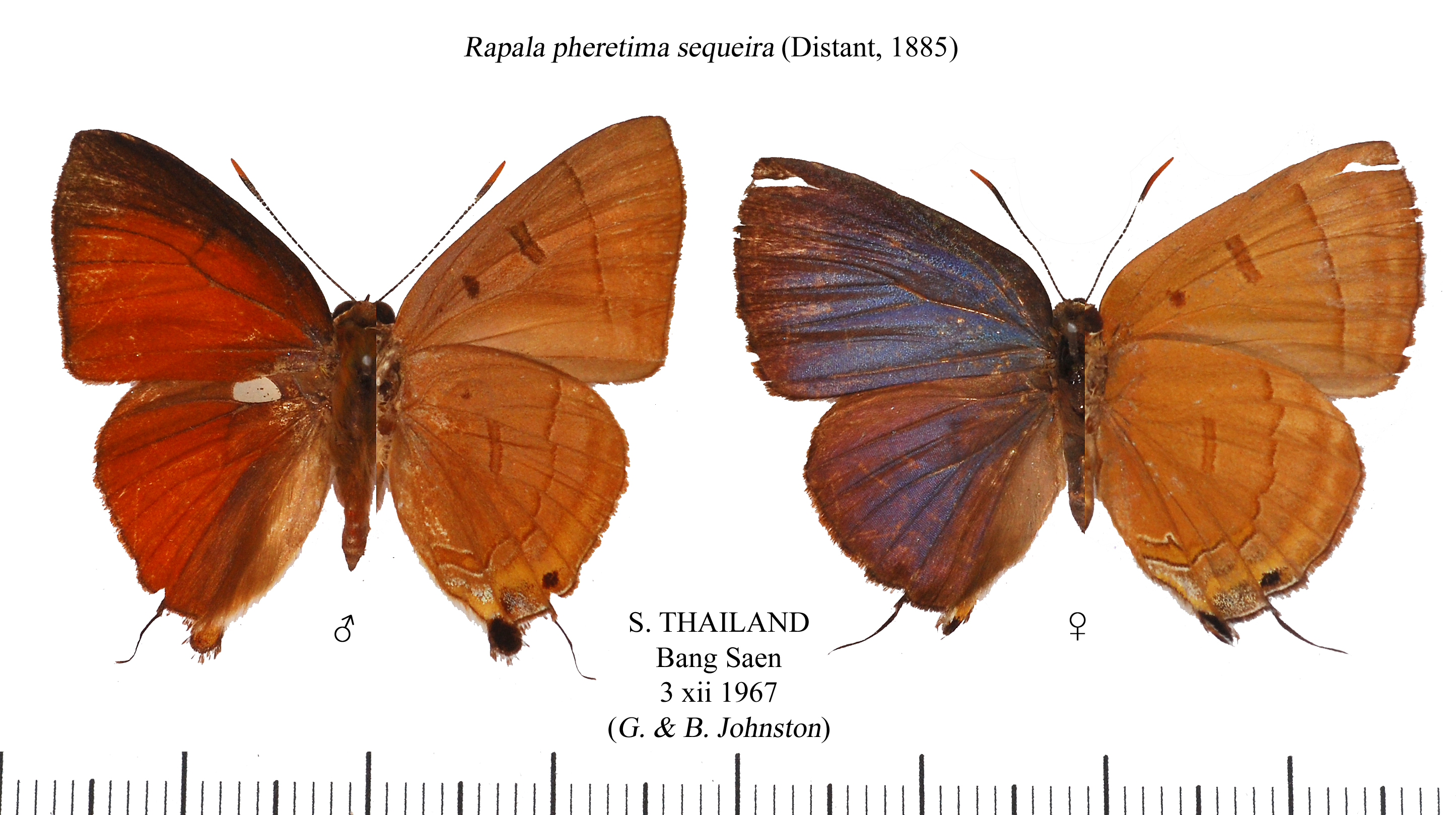
Rapala pheretima sequeira
