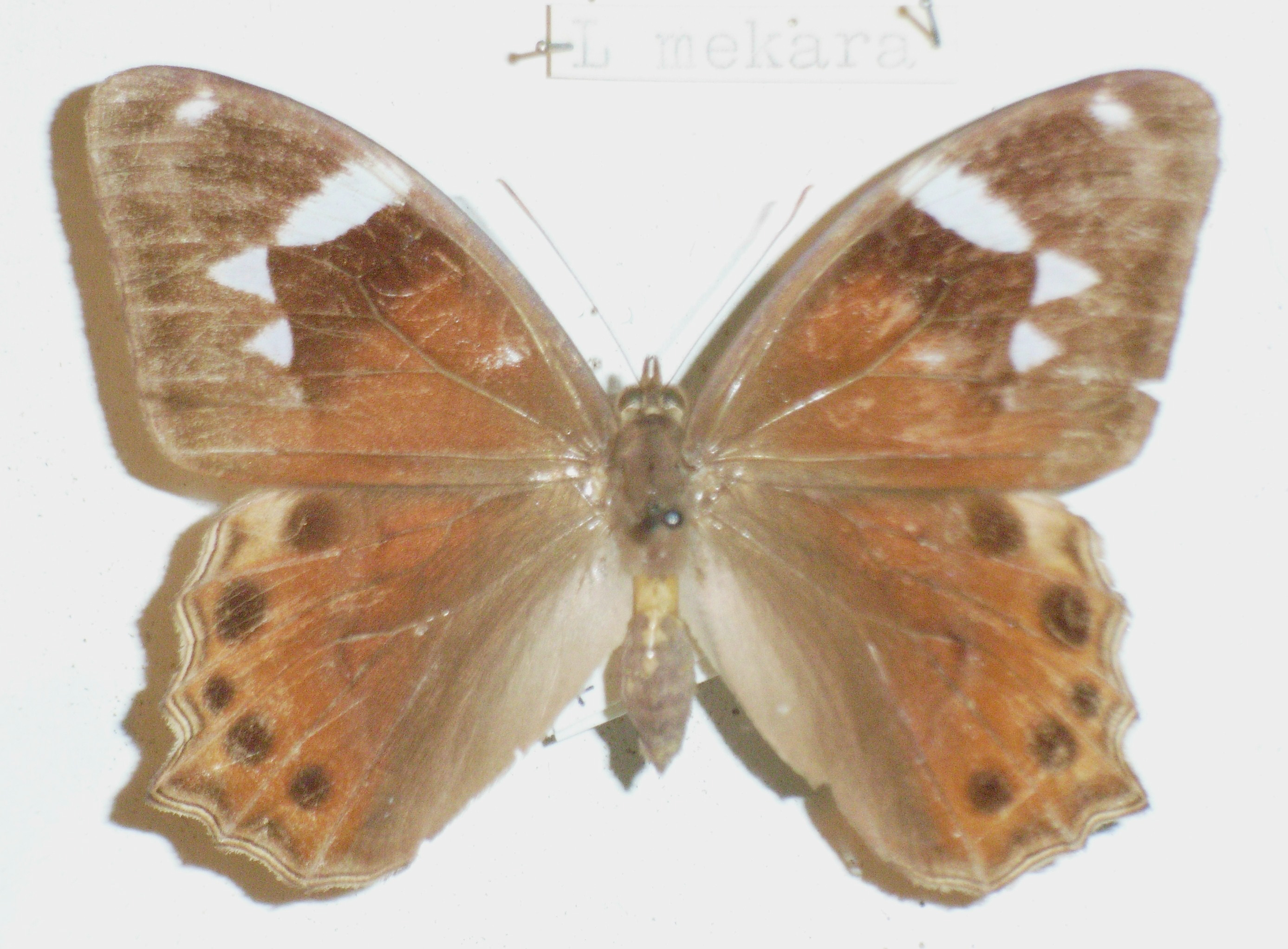

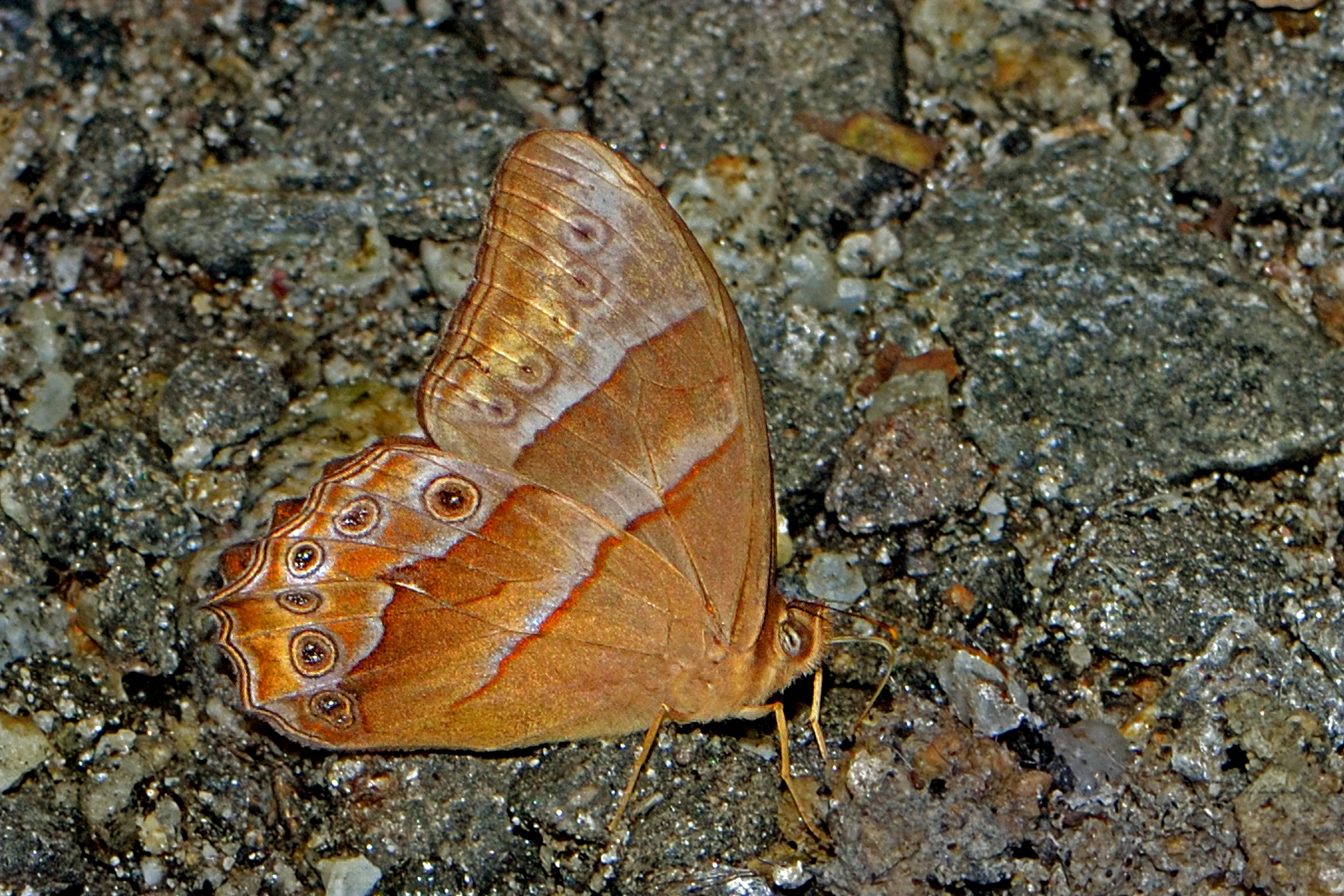

Scientific classification
- Kingdom: Animalia
- Phylum: Arthropoda
- Clade: Pancrustacea
- Class: Insecta
- Order: Lepidoptera
- Family: Nymphalidae
- Genus: Lethe
- Species: L. mekara

Binomial name
- Lethe mekara (Moore, 1858)

= Lethe mekara =

Common red forester

Species of butterfly

Lethe mekara, the common red forester, is a species of Satyrinae butterfly found in India and Southeast Asia.
