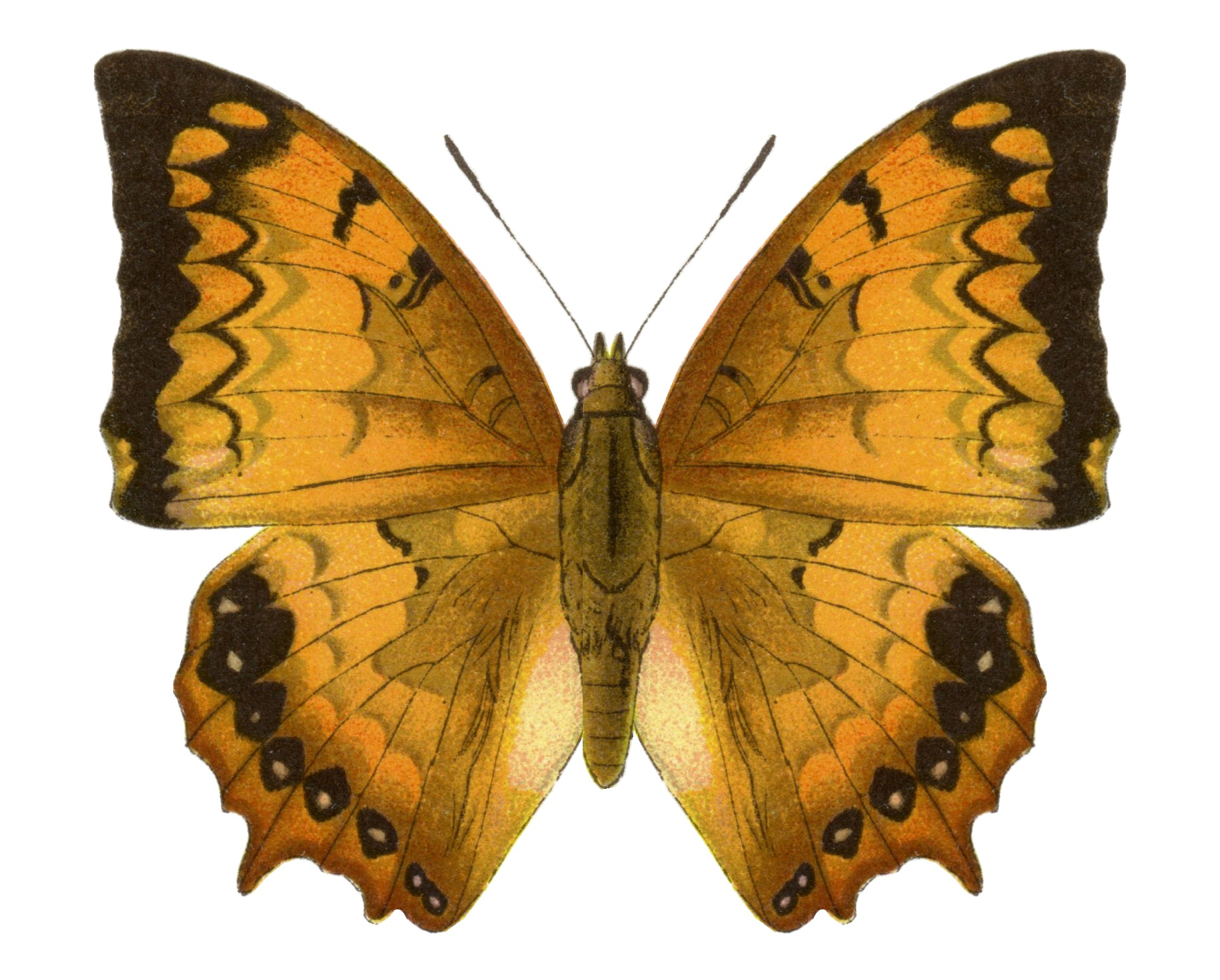
- male

Scientific classification
- Domain: Eukaryota
- Kingdom: Animalia
- Phylum: Arthropoda
- Class: Insecta
- Order: Lepidoptera
- Family: Nymphalidae
- Genus: Charaxes
- Species: C. kahruba

Binomial name
- Charaxes kahruba (Moore, 1895)

= Charaxes kahruba =

Variegated rajah

Species of butterfly

Charaxes kahruba, the variegated rajah, is a butterfly found in Asia that belongs to the rajahs and nawabs group, that is, the Charaxinae group of the brush-footed butterflies family.

== Description ==
This is very similar in appearance to Charaxes marmax. On the upperside in the male two points of difference are—the short oblique portion of the postdiscal band on the forewing near the costal margin is narrower than in C. marmax, and the broad black terminal band on forewing which in C. marmax terminates at vein 1, in kahruba extends to the dorsal margin.

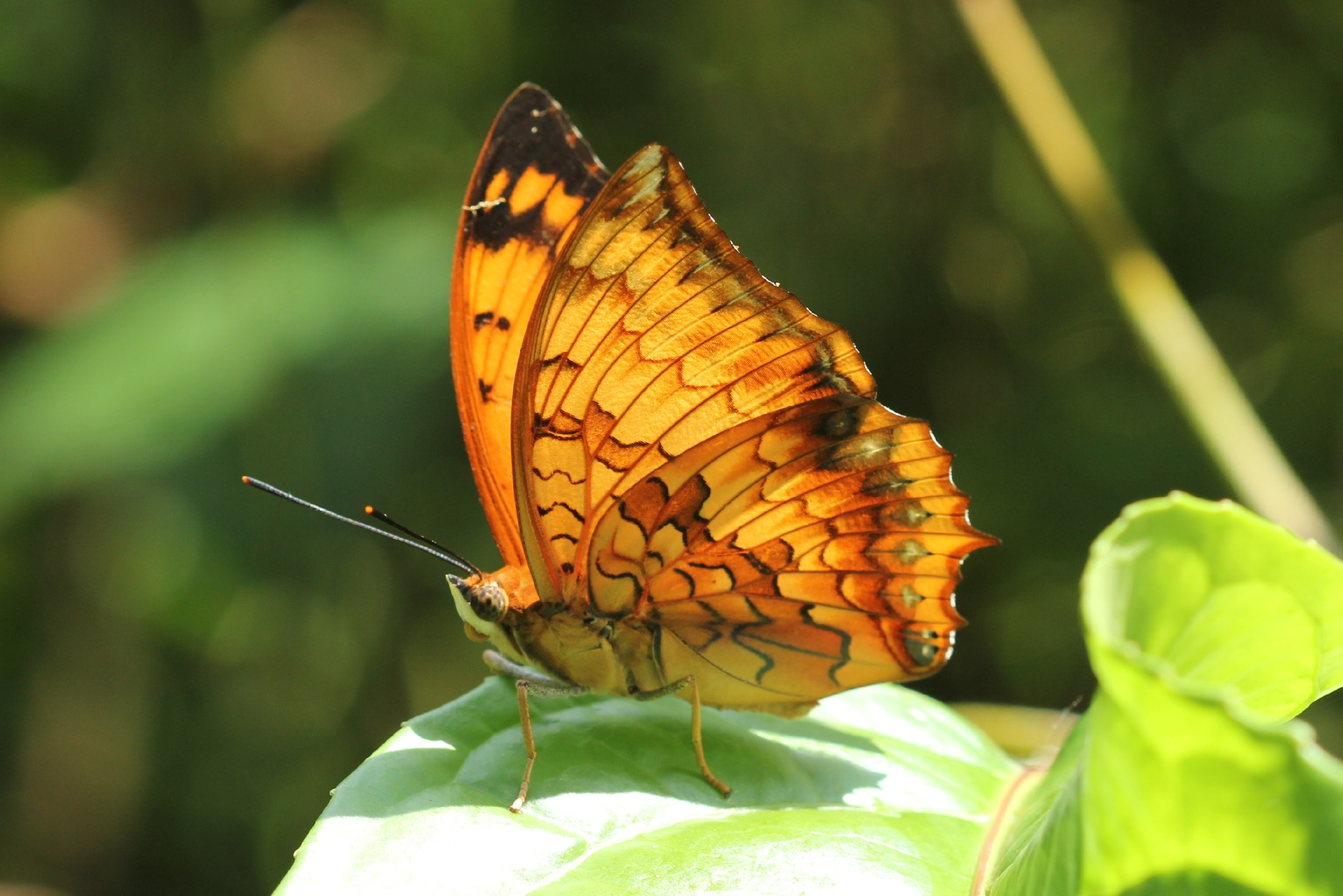
Variegated rajah basking in sun

On the underside the ground colour is paler yellow than in marmax, the transverse black lines crossing both wings more sinuous and more heavily marked, the space between the sinuous transverse lines immediately below apex of cell of forewing, and the space between the continuations of the same lines on the hindwing, rich dark ochraceous chestnut. On both forewing and hindwing the space beyond the lunular, postdiscal, transverse line heavily marked with ochraceous chestnut, especially on the hindwing; the subterminal line of silvery spots on the forewing forms a continuous band; the terminal narrow reddish-brown band on the hindwing very strongly marked. In the female the differences on the underside from marmax are similar in character and as conspicuous and marked as in the male.

The wingspan is 90–115 mm.

Found in the Himalayas from Kumaon to Sikkim; Assam hill-ranges; Arrakan and Tenasserim.

== See also ==
- Charaxinae
- Nymphalidae
- List of butterflies of India
- List of butterflies of India (Nymphalidae)

== Other sources ==
- Evans, W.H. (1932). The Identification of Indian Butterflies (2nd ed.). Mumbai, India: Bombay Natural History Society.
