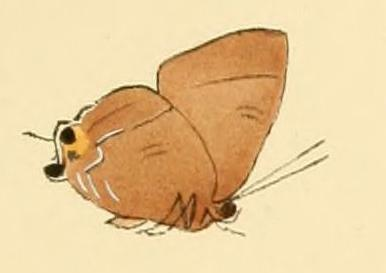

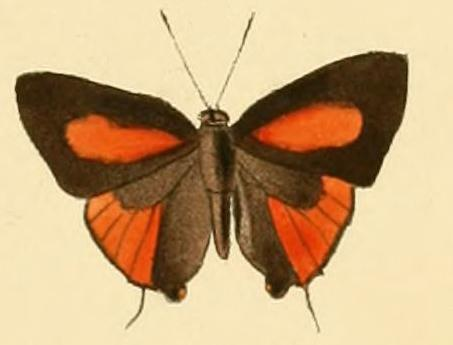

Scientific classification
- Kingdom: Animalia
- Phylum: Arthropoda
- Class: Insecta
- Order: Lepidoptera
- Family: Lycaenidae
- Genus: Rapala
- Species: R. dieneces

Binomial name
- Rapala dieneces (Hewitson, 1878)

= Rapala dieneces =

Scarlet flash

Species of butterfly

Rapala dieneces, the scarlet flash, is a species of lycaenid or blue butterfly first described by William Chapman Hewitson in 1878. It is found in Myanmar, northern India, Assam, Bengal, Malaya, Singapore, Sumatra, Borneo, Nias and the Philippines.
