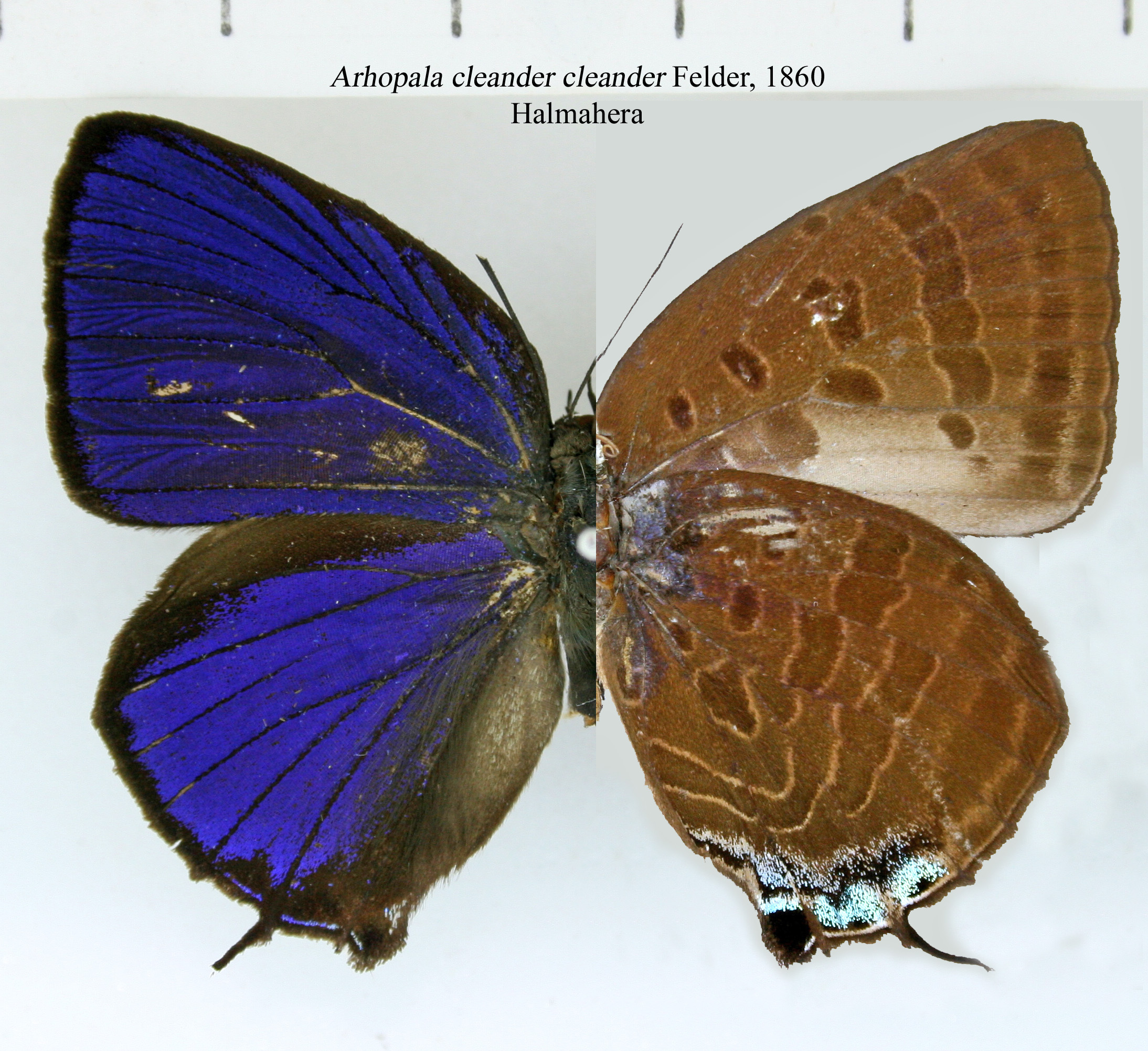

Scientific classification
- Kingdom: Animalia
- Phylum: Arthropoda
- Clade: Pancrustacea
- Class: Insecta
- Order: Lepidoptera
- Family: Lycaenidae
- Genus: Arhopala
- Species: A. cleander

Binomial name
- Arhopala cleander (C. Felder, 1860)

Synonyms
- Amblypodia cleander Felder, 1860; Amblypodia adatha Hewitson, 1862; Arhopala aphadantas Corbet, 1941; Amblypodia cleander regia Evans, [1925]; Arhopala adatha sostrata Fruhstorfer, 1914

= Arhopala cleander =

Species of butterfly

Arhopala cleander is a species of butterfly belonging to the lycaenid family. It was described by Cajetan Felder in 1860. It is found in Southeast Asia (Buru, Ambon, Serang, Borneo, Sumatra, Peninsular Malaya, Burma, Thailand, Sulawesi, Banggai and Selajar).

The species is dark [blue]. A characteristic feature is the very much widened metallic spot before the little tail. The upper surface is [sometimes] of a glaring violettish blue, in specimens from Singapore somewhat darker.

== Subspecies ==
- Arhopala cleander cleander (Buru, Ambon, Serang)
- Arhopala cleander incerta Moulton, 1911 (Borneo, Sumatra)
- Arhopala cleander aphadantas Corbet, 1941 (Peninsular Malaysia)
- Arhopala cleander regia (Evans, [1925]) (southern Burma, Thailand)
- Arhopala cleander apharida Corbet, 1941 (Lombok, Java)
- Arhopala cleander sostrata Fruhstorfer, 1914 (Sulawesi, Banggai, Selajar)
