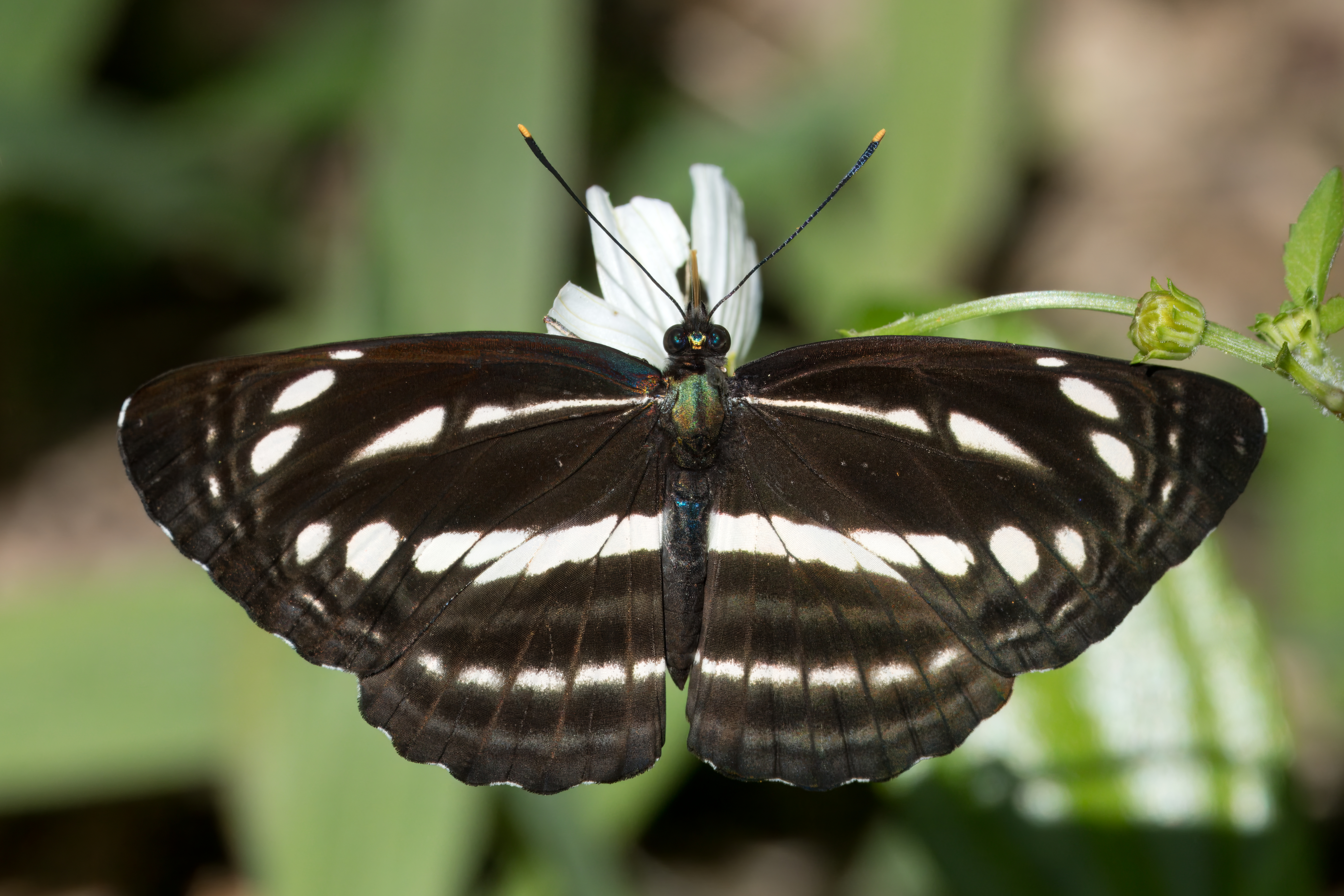
- Neptis nata lutatia, Taiwan
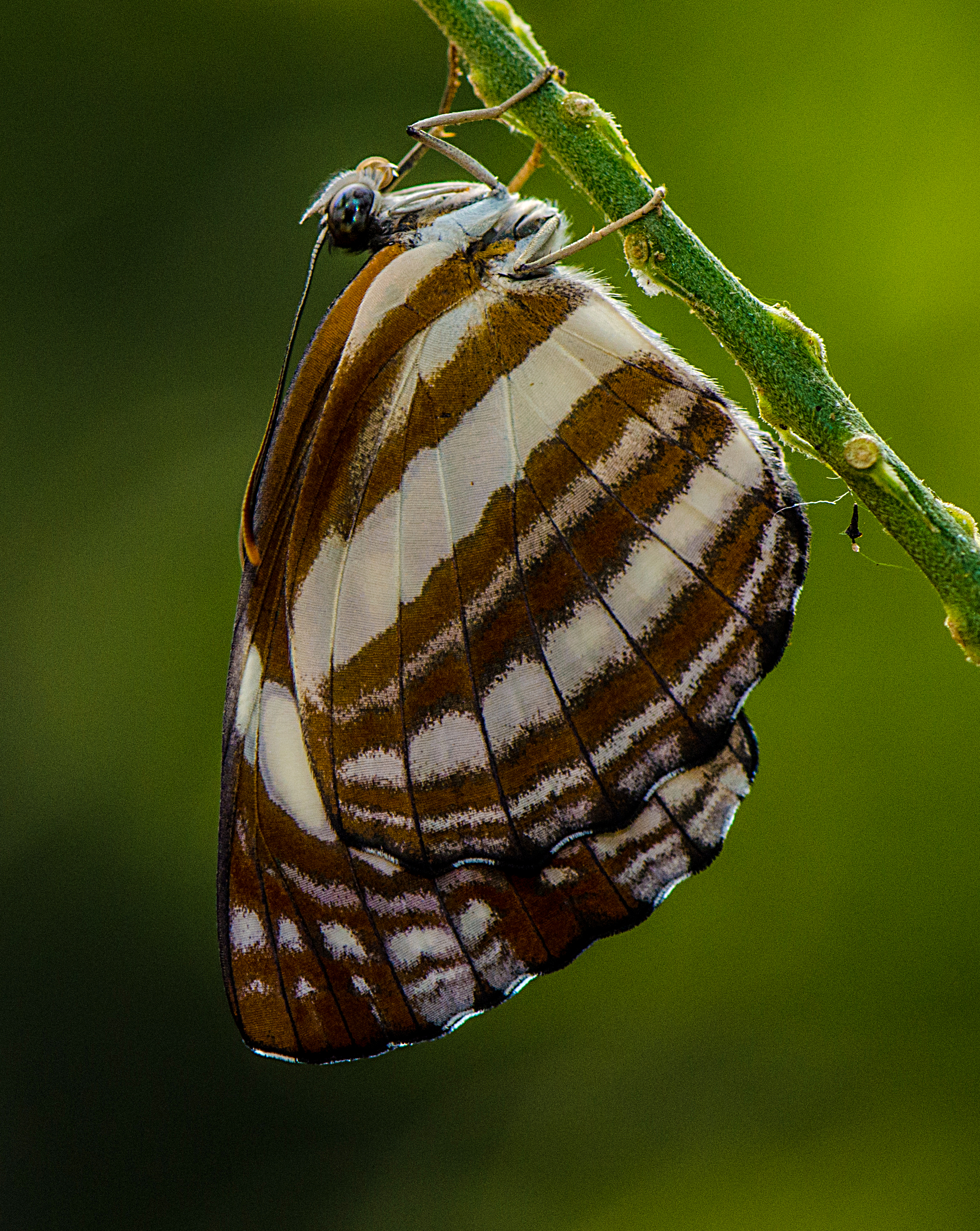

Scientific classification
- Kingdom: Animalia
- Phylum: Arthropoda
- Class: Insecta
- Order: Lepidoptera
- Family: Nymphalidae
- Genus: Neptis
- Species: N. nata

Binomial name
- Neptis nata Moore, 1857

= Neptis nata =

Species of butterfly

Neptis nata, the clear sailer or dirty sailer, is a species of nymphalid butterfly found in south and southeast Asia.

== Description ==
Dry-season brood: Male and female. Upperside deep purpurescent-black; markings bluish-white, very prominent, and with sharply-defined edges; cilia alternated with white. Forewing with the cell-streak broadly truncate at end, the broad discocellular spot beyond elongated to an acute point; discal curved series of spots of moderate size, the subapical rather elongated and oval, the lower four disposed linearly-oblique, the upper one small, oval, and placed very near the submarginal lunules, the two lowest smallest and narrow, the second being broad; a submarginal row of small white lunular spots, which are narrowest in the female, an inner submarginal slender sinuous obscure pale line, and a marginal obscure lunular line. Hindwing with a somewhat narrow inner-discal band, which ends at the upper subcostal vein, and a narrower outer-discal macular band; a medial-discal obscure pale slender lunular line, and a marginal even line; base of costa in male broadly glossy silvery-grey, and with a duller grey medially disposed patch of scales from the costal vein to below base of the radial. Underside dusky olivescent purplish-brown; markings as above, prominent, all bluish-white, except the inner and outer marginal line on forewing, and the medial disoal and marginal line on the hindwing, as well as its two basal streaks, which are lilacine-grey. Body and palpi above black, thorax iridescent; abdomen above with a basal slight bluish-grey band; palpi and thorax beneath, forelegs, middle and hind femora bluish-grey; abdomen beneath, middle and hind tibiae and tarsi pale ochreous-brown. Wet-season hrood: Upperside with all the markings somewhat narrower; underside with the ground-colour reddish-brown; markings as above, except that on the hindwing the medial-discal white band extends anteriorly above the upper subcostal vein.

— Frederic Moore, Lepidoptera Indica. Vol. III
