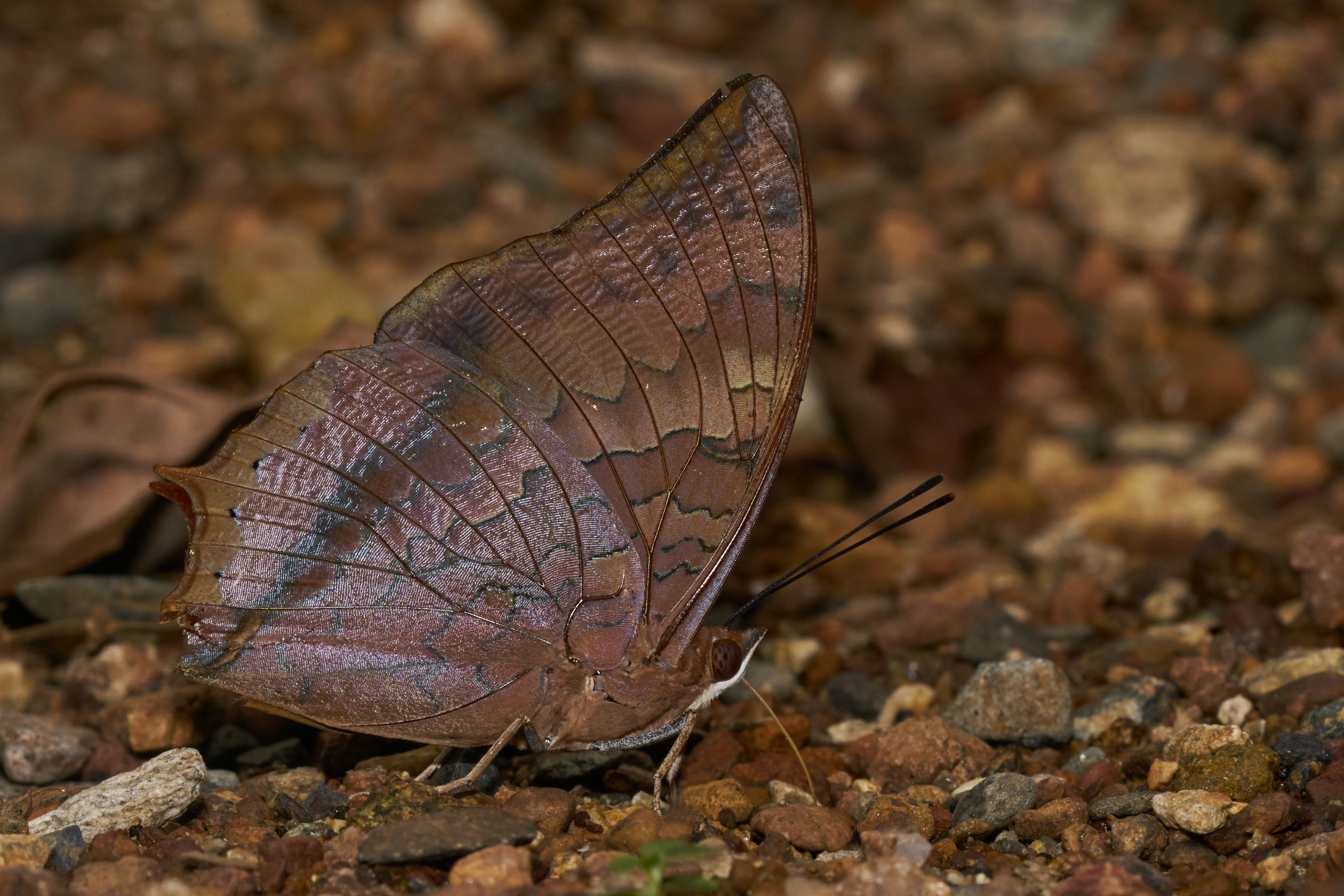
- Male, in Aralam Wildlife Sanctuary, Kerala
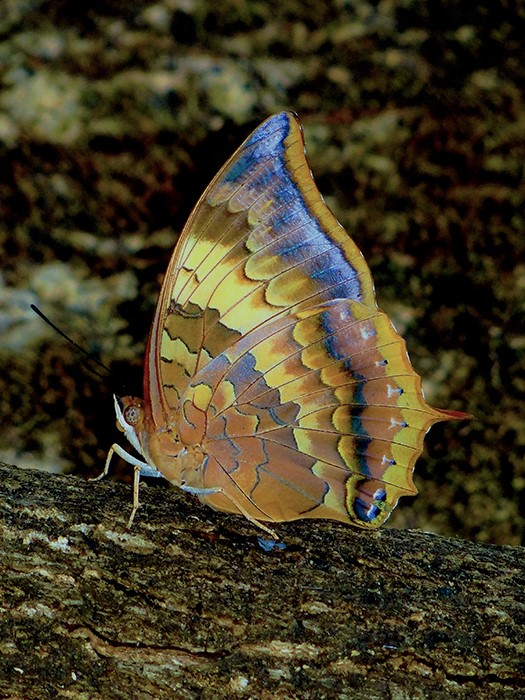
- Female, in Maharashtra, India

Scientific classification
- Kingdom: Animalia
- Phylum: Arthropoda
- Class: Insecta
- Order: Lepidoptera
- Family: Nymphalidae
- Genus: Charaxes
- Species: C. psaphon

Binomial name
- Charaxes psaphon Westwood, 1847

Synonyms
- Haridra serendiba Moore, [1880]; Charaxes imna Butler, 1870

= Charaxes psaphon =

Species of butterfly

Charaxes psaphon, plain tawny rajah, is a butterfly in the family Nymphalidae. It was described by John Obadiah Westwood in 1847. It is found in the Indomalayan realm.

== Subspecies ==
- Charaxes psaphon psaphon (Sri Lanka)
- Charaxes psaphon imna Butler, 1870 (India)

== Description ==
Charaxes psaphon psaphon: Male. Upperside dark fulvous-red. Forewing with the exterior half purpurescent-black, forming a broad marginal band, its inner edge being erect and sinuous; a discocellular duplex black mark, and some very indistinct slender blackish discoidal streaks. Hindwing with a very broad apical and marginal band, which sinuously attenuates hindward, and terminates in two small white-marked anal spots; a short sinuous black streak from the costa contiguous to the band. Underside fulvous-brown, washed with purplish-grey. Both wings crossed by three basal, and two discal zigzag black lines with pale borders. Forewing also with a submarginal fascia composed of more or less defined small blackish dentate inner spots and outer diffused pearly-white dentate lunules. Hindwing also with a submarginal darker blackish-grey lunular fascia, and outer series of small black-tipt pearly-white dentate spots.

Female. Upperside deep fulvous-yellow. Forewing with a transverse medial discal purplish-white band, which shows, by semi-transparency, the discal sinuous line of the underside, and is edged inwardly by a broken black line which is more or less inwardly diffused anteriorly; outer border of the wing broadly black, with its inner edge sinuous, and bearing a slight fulvous lunular posterior inner streak. Hindwing with a short medial discal purplish-white band edged inwardly by a slender black sinuous line; submarginal black band broad, as in the male, but broken and macular posteriorly, and with a distinct white lunule on each portion between all the veins, the anal spot being also blue-speckled. Underside. Olivescent fulvous-brown, darkest basally and externally, and washed with purplish-grey; transverse markings throughout, as in the male; the subbasal interspace being slightly, and the medial discal interspace distinctly fulvous-white or pale fulvous-yellow. Body entirely dark fulvous-red; palpi blackish above, white beneath; pectus fulvous-white; legs above dark fulvous-red, whitish beneath; fore-tarsi fulvous-white; antennae black; eyes dark red.

Charaxes psaphon imna: Male. Upperside of a somewhat paler fulvous-red than in the closely allied psaphon. Forewing with the black marginal band slightly narrower, the dis-cocellular streak slightly defined. Hindwing with the black band comparatively narrower apically, and posteriorly broken up into two or three spots, in addition to the white-centred anal spots; the slender costal streak also further from the apical portion of the band. Underside paler fulvous-brown than in psaphon; markings similar, but of a more generally uniform tint throughout; the sinuous transverse lines and fascias being much less defined.

Female. Upperside similar to that of psaphon, the fulvous colour somewhat paler. Forewing with the white band comparatively narrower, and its inner black edgings less sharply defined. Hindwing also similar, but the black macular band somewhat narrower. Underside similar, but paler, and the transverse sinuous markings less defined.

— Frederic Moore, Lepidoptera Indica. Vol. II

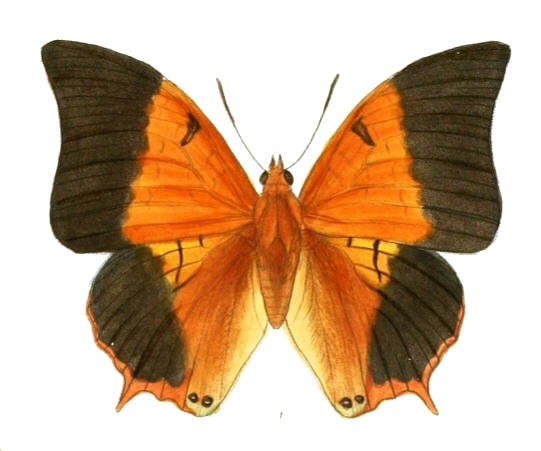
Male

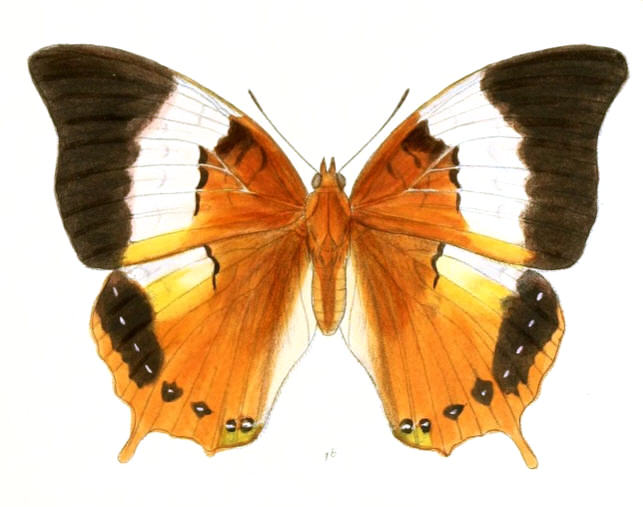
Female
