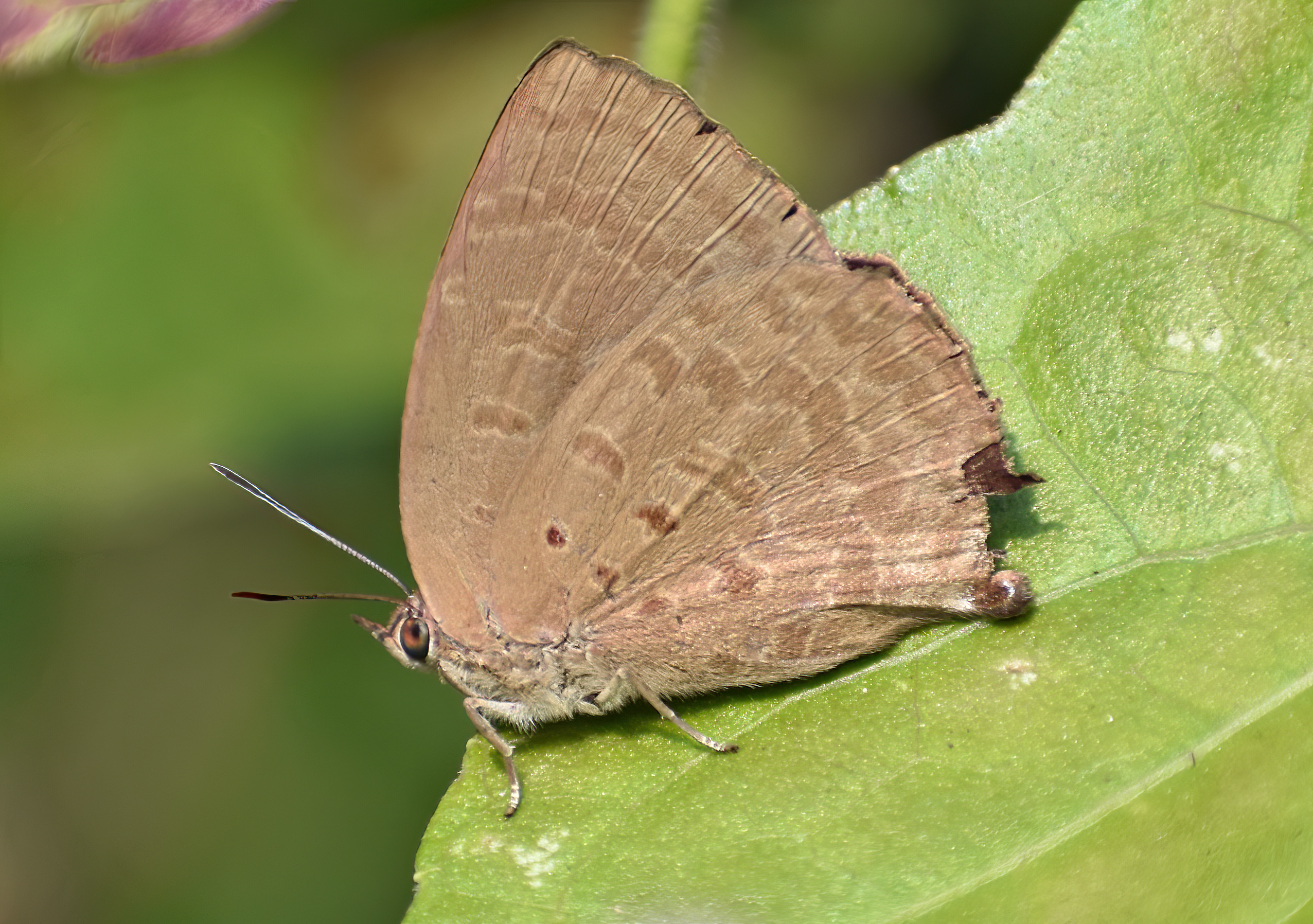

Scientific classification
- Kingdom: Animalia
- Phylum: Arthropoda
- Clade: Pancrustacea
- Class: Insecta
- Order: Lepidoptera
- Family: Lycaenidae
- Genus: Arhopala
- Species: A. oenea

Binomial name
- Arhopala oenea (Hewitson, 1869)

= Arhopala oenea =

Species of butterfly

Arhopala oenea , Hewitson's dull oakblue, is a butterfly in the family Lycaenidae. It was described by William Chapman Hewitson in 1869. It is found in the Indomalayan realm (Sikkim, Burma, Assam, Nepal, Indo China, Hainan, Yunnan).

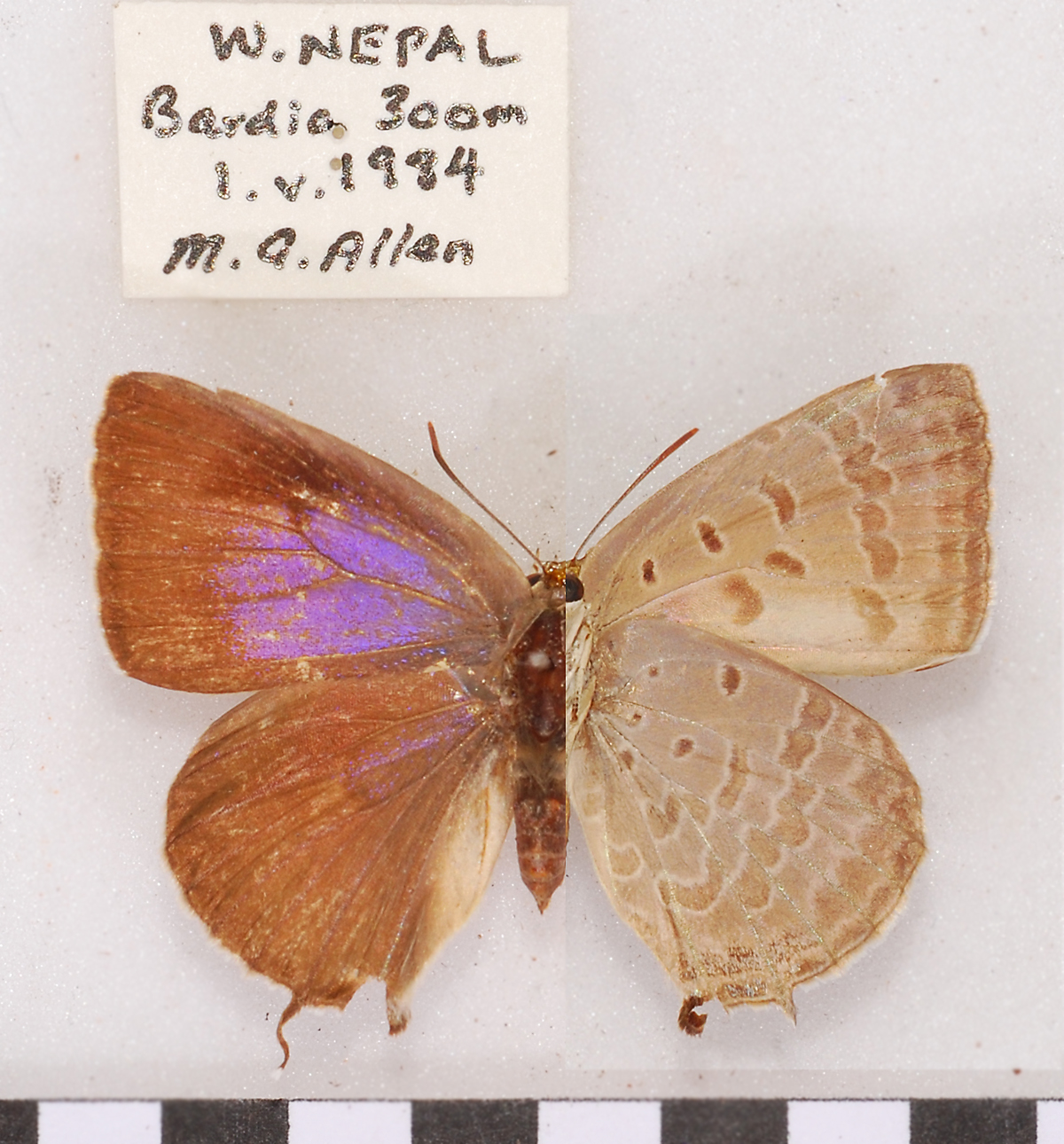

Lighter ground than the very similar Arhopala allata differing in the pale reddish-brown under surface on which the dark brown markings are rather scanty; particularly the proximal spots are small, some almost punctiform.
