= List of butterflies of Singapore =

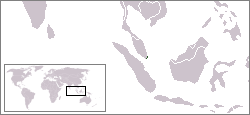
Location of Singapore

This is a list of butterflies of Singapore. About 305 species are known from Singapore.

== Papilionidae ==
=== Papilioninae ===
- Chilasa clytia clytia – common mime
- Graphium agamemnon agamemnon – tailed jay
- Graphium doson evemonides – common jay
- Graphium evemon eventus – blue jay
- Graphium sarpedon luctatius – common bluebottle
- Pachliopta aristolochiae asteris – common rose
- Papilio demoleus malayanus – lime butterfly
- Papilio demolion demolion – banded swallowtail
- Papilio iswara iswara – great Helen
- Papilio memnon agenor – great Mormon
- Papilio polytes romulus – common Mormon
- Papilio prexaspes prexaspes – blue Helen
- Pathysa antiphates itamputi – five bar swordtail
- Troides amphrysus ruficollis – Malayan birdwing
- Troides helena cerberus – common birdwing

== Pieridae ==
=== Coliadinae ===
- Catopsilia pomona pomona – lemon emigrant
- Catopsilia pyranthe pyranthe – mottled emigrant
- Catopsilia scylla cornelia – orange emigrant
- Eurema andersonii andersonii – Anderson's grass yellow
- Eurema blanda snelleni – three spot grass yellow
- Eurema brigitta senna – no brand grass yellow
- Eurema hecabe contubernalis – common grass yellow
- Eurema sari sodalis – chocolate grass yellow
- Eurema simulatrix tecmessa
- Gandaca harina distanti – tree yellow

=== Pierinae ===
- Appias indra plana – plain puffin
- Appias libythea olferna – striped albatross
- Appias lyncida vasava – chocolate albatross
- Delias hyparete metarete – painted Jezebel
- Delias pasithoe parthenope – red base Jezebel
- Hebomoia glaucippe aturia – great orange tip
- Leptosia nina malayana – Psyche
- Pareronia valeria lutescens – wanderer
- Pieris canidia canidia – cabbage white

== Nymphalidae ==
=== Danainae ===
- Danaus chrysippus chrysippus – plain tiger
- Danaus genutia genutia – common tiger
- Danaus melanippus hegesippus – black veined tiger
- Euploea camaralzeman malayica – Malayan crow
- Euploea crameri bremeri – spotted black crow
- Euploea eyndhovii gardineri – striped black crow
- Euploea midamus singapura – blue spotted crow
- Euploea mulciber mulciber – striped blue crow
- Euploea phaenareta castelnaui – king crow
- Euploea radamanthus radamanthus – magpie crow
- Euploea tulliolus ledereri – dwarf crow
- Idea leuconoe chersonesia – mangrove tree nymph
- Idea stolli logani – common tree nymph
- Ideopsis vulgaris macrina – blue glassy tiger
- Parantica agleoides agleoides – dark glassy tiger
- Parantica aspasia aspasia – yellow glassy tiger

=== Satyrinae ===
- Elymnias hypermnestra agina – common palmfly
- Elymnias panthera panthera – tawny palmfly
- Elymnias penanga penanga – pointed palmfly
- Lethe europa malaya – bamboo tree brown
- Melanitis leda leda – common evening brown
- Mycalesis fusca fusca – Malayan bush brown
- Mycalesis mineus macromalayana – dark brand bush brown
- Mycalesis orseis nautilus – purple bush brown
- Mycalesis perseoides perseoides
- Mycalesis perseus cepheus – dingy bush brown
- Mycalesis visala phamis – long branded bush brown
- Orsotriaena medus cinerea – nigger
- Ypthima baldus newboldi – common five ring
- Ypthima fasciata torone
- Ypthima horsfieldii humei - Malayan five ring
- Ypthima huebneri – common four ring
- Ypthima pandocus corticaria – common three ring

=== Morphinae ===
- Amathusia phidippus phidippus – palm king
- Discophora sondaica despoliata – common duffer
- Faunis canens arcesilas – common faun
- Thaumantis klugius lucipor – dark blue jungle glory
- Zeuxidia amethystus amethystus – Saturn

=== Nymphalinae ===
- Doleschallia bisaltide ?bisalitide var. – autumn leaf
- Doleschallia bisaltide pratipa – autumn leaf
- Hypolimnas anomala anomala – Malayan eggfly
- Hypolimnas bolina bolina – great eggfly
- Hypolimnas bolina jacintha – Jacintha eggfly
- Hypolimnas misippus misippus – Danaid eggfly
- Junonia almana javana – peacock pansy
- Junonia atlites atlites – grey pansy
- Junonia hedonia ida – chocolate pansy
- Junonia orithya wallacei – blue pansy
- Vanessa cardui – painted lady
- Vanessa indica indica – Indian red admiral

=== Heliconiinae ===
- Acraea violae – tawny coster
- Cethosia cyane – leopard lacewing
- Cethosia hypsea hypsina – Malay lacewing
- Cethosia penthesilea methypsea – plain lacewing
- Cirrochroa orissa orissa – banded yeoman
- Cupha erymanthis lotis – rustic
- Phalanta phalantha phalantha – leopard
- Terinos terpander robertsia – royal Assyrian
- Vindula dejone erotella – cruiser

=== Limenitidinae ===
- Athyma asura idita – studded sergeant
- Athyma kanwa kanwa – dot-dash sergeant
- Athyma nefte subrata – colour sergeant
- Athyma pravara helma – lance sergeant
- Athyma reta moorei – Malay staff sergeant
- Euthalia aconthea gurda – baron
- Euthalia adonia pinwilli – green baron
- Euthalia merta merta – white tipped baron
- Euthalia monina monina – Malay baron
- Lasippa heliodore dorelia – Burmese lascar
- Lasippa tiga siaka – Malayan lascar
- Lebadea martha parkeri – knight
- Lexias canescens pardalina – yellow archduke
- Lexias dirtea merguia – black tipped archduke
- Lexias pardalis dirteana – archduke
- Moduza procris milonia – commander
- Neptis harita harita – chocolate sailor
- Neptis hylas papaja – common sailor
- Neptis leucoporos cresina – grey sailor
- Pandita sinope sinope – colonel
- Pantoporia hordonia hordonia – common lascar
- Pantoporia paraka paraka – Perak lascar
- Phaedyma columella singa – short banded sailor
- Symbrenthia hippoclus – common jester
- Tanaecia japis puseda – Horsfield's baron
- Tanaecia pelea pelea – Malay viscount

=== Cyrestinae ===
- Chersonesia peraka peraka – little maplet

=== Apaturinae ===
- Eulaceura osteria kumana – purple duke
- Euripus nyctelius eupleoides – courtesan

=== Charaxinae ===
- Charaxes solon echo – black rajah
- Polyura hebe plautus – plain nawab
- Polyura schreiber tisamenus – blue nawab

== Riodinidae ==
=== Riodininae ===
- Abisara geza niya – spotted Judy
- Abisara saturata kausamboides – Malayan plum Judy
- Abisara savitri savitri – Malay tailed Judy
- Laxita thuisto thuisto – lesser harlequin
- Taxila haquinus haquinus – harlequin

== Lycaenidae ==
=== Poritiinae ===
- Poritia philota philota – Malayan Gem
- Poritia sumatrae sumatrae – Sumatran Gem

=== Miletinae ===
- Allotinus unicolor unicolor – lesser darkie
- Liphyra brassolis abbreviata – moth butterfly
- Logania marmorata damis – pale mottle
- Miletus biggsii biggsii – Bigg's brownie
- Miletus gopara gopara
- Miletus symethus petronius
- Spalgis epius epius – apefly

=== Curetinae ===
- Curetis santana malayica – Malayan sunbeam
- Curetis saronis sumatrana – Sumatran sunbeam

=== Aphnaeinae ===
- Cigaritis lohita senama – long banded silverline
- Cigaritis syama terana – club silverline

=== Theclinae ===
- Ancema blanka blanka – silver royal
- Arhopala abseus abseus – aberrant oakblue
- Arhopala aedias agnis – large metallic oakblue
- Arhopala ammon ammon
- Arhopala amphimuta amphimuta
- Arhopala antimuta antimuta
- Arhopala athada athada – vinous oakblue
- Arhopala atosia malayana – tailed disc oakblue
- Arhopala aurea
- Arhopala centaurus nakula – centaur oakblue
- Arhopala epimuta epiala – common disc oakblue
- Arhopala eumolphus maxwelli – green oakblue
- Arhopala major major
- Arhopala myrzala lammas
- Arhopala pseudomuta pseudomuta – Raffles oakblue
- Arhopala silhetensis adorea – Sylhet oakblue
- Arhopala trogon
- Bindahara phocides phocides – plane
- Catapaecilma major emas – gray tinsel
- Cheritra freja frigga – common imperial
- Deudorix elioti – Eliot's cornelian
- Deudorix epijarbas cinnabarus – cornelian
- Drupadia ravindra moorei – common posy
- Drupadia rufotaenia rufotaenia – pygmy posy
- Drupadia theda thesmia – dark posy
- Eliotia jalindra burbona – banded royal
- Eooxylides tharis distanti – branded imperial
- Flos anniella anniella – darky plushblue
- Flos apidanus saturatus – plain plushblue
- Flos diardi capeta – bifid plushblue
- Flos fulgida singhapura – shining plushblue
- Horaga syrinx maenala – Ambon onyx
- Hypolycaena erylus teatus – common tit
- Hypolycaena thecloides thecloides – dark tit
- Iraota distanti distanti – spotted silverstreak
- Iraota rochana boswelliana – scarce silverstreak
- Jacoona anasuja anasuja – great imperial
- Loxura atymnus fuconius – yamfly
- Manto hypoleuca terana – green imperial
- Neocheritra amrita amrita – grand imperial
- Pratapa deva relata – white royal
- Pseudotajuria donatana donatana – golden royal
- Rachana jalindra burbona – banded royal
- Rapala dieneces dieneces – scarlet flash
- Rapala domitia domitia – yellow flash
- Rapala iarbus iarbus – common red flash
- Rapala manea chozeba – slate flash
- Rapala pheretima sequiera – copper flash
- Rapala suffusa barthema – suffused flash
- Rapala varuna orseis – indigo flash
- Remelana jangala travana – chocolate royal
- Semanga superba deliciosa – red-edge
- Sinthusa nasaka amba – narrow spark
- Surendra vivarna amisena – acacia blue
- Tajuria cippus maxentius – peacock royal
- Tajuria dominus dominus
- Tajuria mantra mantra – Felder's royal
- Virachola kessuma deliochus – pitcher blue
- Zeltus amasa maximinianus – fluffy tit

=== Polyommatinae ===
- Acytolepis puspa lambi – common hedge blue
- Anthene emolus goberus – ciliate blue
- Anthene lycaenina miya – pointed ciliate blue
- Caleta elna elvira – elbowed Pierrot
- Castalius rosimon rosimon – common Pierrot
- Catochrysops panormus exiguus – silver forget-me-not
- Catochrysops strabo strabo – forget-me-not
- Catopyrops ancyra – Ancyra blue
- Euchrysops cnejus cnejus – gram blue
- Everes lacturnus rileyi – Indian Cupid
- Ionolyce helicon merguiana – pointed line blue
- Jamides alecto ageladas – metallic caerulean
- Jamides bochus nabonassar – dark caerulean
- Jamides caeruleus caeruleus – sky blue
- Jamides celeno aelianus – common caerulean
- Jamides elpis pseudelpis – glistening caerulean
- Jamides malaccanus malaccanus – Malaccan caerulean
- Lampides boeticus – pea blue
- Luthrodes pandava pandava – cycad blue
- Megisba malaya sikkima – Malayan
- Nacaduba angusta kerriana – white four-line blue
- Nacaduba berenice icena – rounded six line blue
- Nacaduba beroe neon – opaque six line blue
- Nacaduba biocellata – two spotted line blue
- Nacaduba calauria malayica – dark Malayan six line blue
- Nacaduba pactolus odon – large four-line blue
- Nacaduba pavana singapura – Singapore four-line blue
- Nacaduba sanaya elioti – jewel four-line blue
- Neopithecops zalmora zalmora – Quaker
- Petrelaea dana dana – dingy line blue
- Prosotas dubiosa lumpura – tailess line blue
- Prosotas lutea sivoka – banded lineblue
- Prosotas nora superdates – common line-blue
- Zizeeria maha serica – pale grass blue
- Zizina otis lampa – lesser grass blue
- Zizula hylax pygmaea – pygmy grass blue

== Hesperiidae ==
=== Coeliadinae ===
- Badamia exclamationis – brown awl
- Bibasis sena uniformis – orange tailed awl
- Burara etelka – great orange awlet
- Burara harisa consobrina – orange awlet
- Hasora badra badra – common awl
- Hasora chromus chromus – common banded awl
- Hasora schoenherr chuza – yellow banded awl
- Hasora taminatus malayana – white banded awl
- Hasora vitta vitta – plain banded awl

=== Pyrginae ===
- Celaenorrhinus asmara asmara – white banded flat
- Gerosis limax dirae – black and white flat
- Gerosis sinica minima
- Mooreana trichoneura trichoneura – yellow flat
- Odina hieroglyphica ortina – hieroglyphic flat
- Odontoptilum angulatum angulatum – chestnut angle
- Pseudocoladenia dan dhyana – fulvous pied flat
- Tagiades calligana – Malayan snow flat
- Tagiades gana gana – large snow flat
- Tagiades japetus atticus – common snow flat
- Tagiades ultra – ultra snow flat
- Tapena thwaitesi bornea

=== Hesperiinae ===
- Ampittia dioscorides camertes – bush hopper
- Ancistroides nigrita maura – chocolate demon
- Astictopterus jama jama – forest hopper
- Baoris farri farri – bamboo paintbrush swift
- Baoris oceia – paintbrush swift
- Borbo cinnara cinnara – Formosan swift
- Caltoris cormasa – full stop swift
- Caltoris philippina philippina – Philippine swift
- Cephrenes trichopepla – yellow palm dart
- Cephrenes acalle niasicus – plain palm dart
- Eetion elia – white spot palmer
- Erionota acroleuca apicalis – white-tipped skipper
- Erionota thrax thrax – banana skipper
- Erionota torus – torus skipper
- Gangara lebadea lebadea – banded redeye
- Gangara thyrsis thyrsis – giant redeye
- Halpe zema – dark-banded ace
- Hidari irava – coconut skipper
- Hyarotis adrastus praba – tree flitter
- Iambrix salsala salsala – chestnut bob
- Iambrix stellifer stellifer – starry bob
- Matapa aria – common redeye
- Notocrypta paralysos varians – banded demon
- Oriens gola pseudolus – common dartlet
- Oriens paragola – Malay dartlet
- Pelopidas assamensis – great swift
- Pelopidas conjunctus conjunctus – conjoined swift
- Pelopidas mathias mathias – small branded swift
- Pemara pugnans – pugnacious lancer
- Plastingia naga – chequered lancer
- Plastingia pellonia – yellow chequered lancer
- Polytremis lubricans lubricans – contiguous swift
- Potanthus omaha omaha – lesser dart
- Potanthus serina – large dart
- Potanthus trachala tytleri – detached dart
- Pyroneura latoia latoia – yellow vein lancer
- Quedara monteithi monteithi
- Salanoemia tavoyana – yellow streak darter
- Suastus everyx everyx – white palm bob
- Suastus gremius gremius – palm bob
- Taractrocera archias quinta – yellow grass dart
- Taractrocera ardonia lamia
- Telicota augias augias – palm dart
- Telicota besta bina – Besta palm dart
- Telicota colon stinga – common palm dart
- Udaspes folus – grass demon
- Unkana ambasa batara – hoary palmer
- Zela storeyi
- Zographetus doxus – spotted flitter

== See also ==
- Wildlife of Singapore
