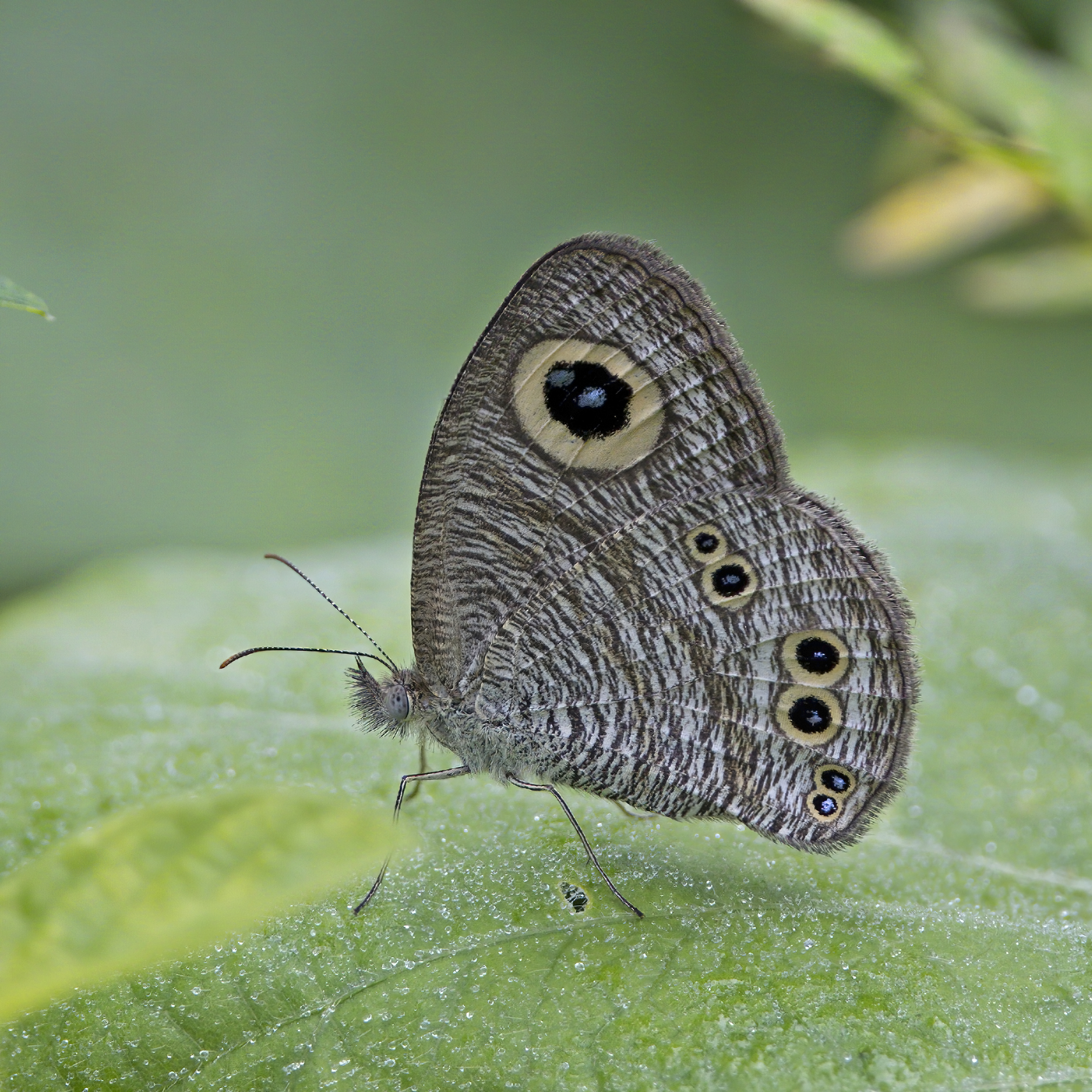
- Ypthima baldus newboldi, Thailand

Scientific classification
- Kingdom: Animalia
- Phylum: Arthropoda
- Clade: Pancrustacea
- Class: Insecta
- Order: Lepidoptera
- Family: Nymphalidae
- Genus: Ypthima
- Species: Y. baldus

Binomial name
- Ypthima baldus (Fabricius, 1775)

Synonyms
- Papilio baldus Fabricius, 1775; Ypthima argus Butler, 1866; Ypthima prattii Elwes & Edwards, 1893; Ypthima baldus ishigakina Fruhstorfer, 1908; Ypthima gallienus Fruhstorfer, 1911; Ypthima scota Fruhstorfer, 1911; Ypthima morus Fruhstorfer, 1911; Ypthima satpura Evans, 1924; Ypthima madrasa Evans, 1924; Zephyrus narensis Sugitani, 1932; Ypthima baldus kangeana Kalis, 1933; Ypthima newboldi Distant, 1882; Ypthima marshalli Butler, 1882; Ypthima evanescens Butler, 1881; Ypthima argus var. jezoensis Matsumura, 1919

= Ypthima baldus =

Common five-ring

Species of butterfly

Ypthima baldus, the common five-ring, is a species of butterfly in the subfamily Satyrinae found in Asia.

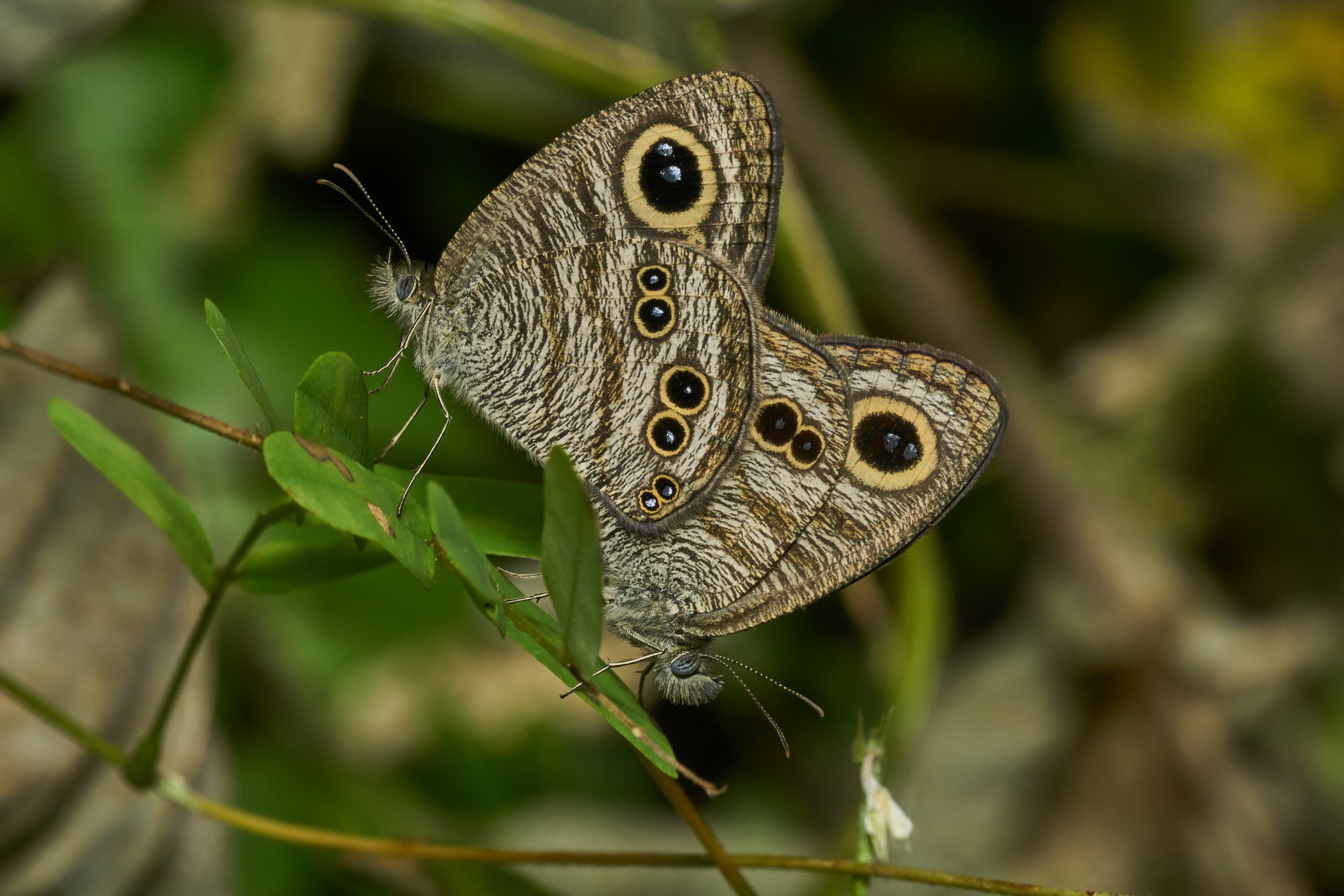
Mating pair

== Description ==
=== Wet-season form (in India) ===
Male: Upperside brown, both forewing and hindwing with terminal margins much darker, and generally with more or less distinct subbasal and discal dark bands. Forewing with a large, slightly oblique, oval, bi-pupilled, yellow-ringed black, pre-apical ocellus. Hindwing with two postdiscal, round, uni-pupilled, similar but smaller ocelli, and very often one or two minute tornal ocelli also.

Underside similar to the underside in Y. philomela but the ochraceous-white ground colour paler, thin transverse brown striae coarser, the ocelli on the hindwing more distinctly arranged in an echelon, two tornal, two median, and two preapical, and on both forewing and hindwing more or less distinctly defined, subbasal, discal and subterminal brown transverse bands.

Female: Differs on the upperside in having the area surrounding or bordering the ocelli on both forewing and hindwing paler, closely irrorated (sprinkled) with brown striae, the discal transverse band generally clearly defined, and very often both the tornal, and at least one of the apical, ocelli distinct. On the underside it is paler than the male, and has the subbasal, discal and subterminal transverse dark bands more clearly defined.

=== Dry-season form (in India) ===
Males and females: Upperside very similar to the above, paler; in the female often the ground colour ochraceous white, closely irrorated with brown striae; ocelli as in the wet-season form, but those on the hindwing often non-pupilled. Underside also paler than in the wet-season form, the subbasal, discal and subterminal bands on the whole more prominent; ocelli on the hindwing reduced to mere specks.

Wingspan of 38–46 mm.

Mating pair and other specimens in Japan

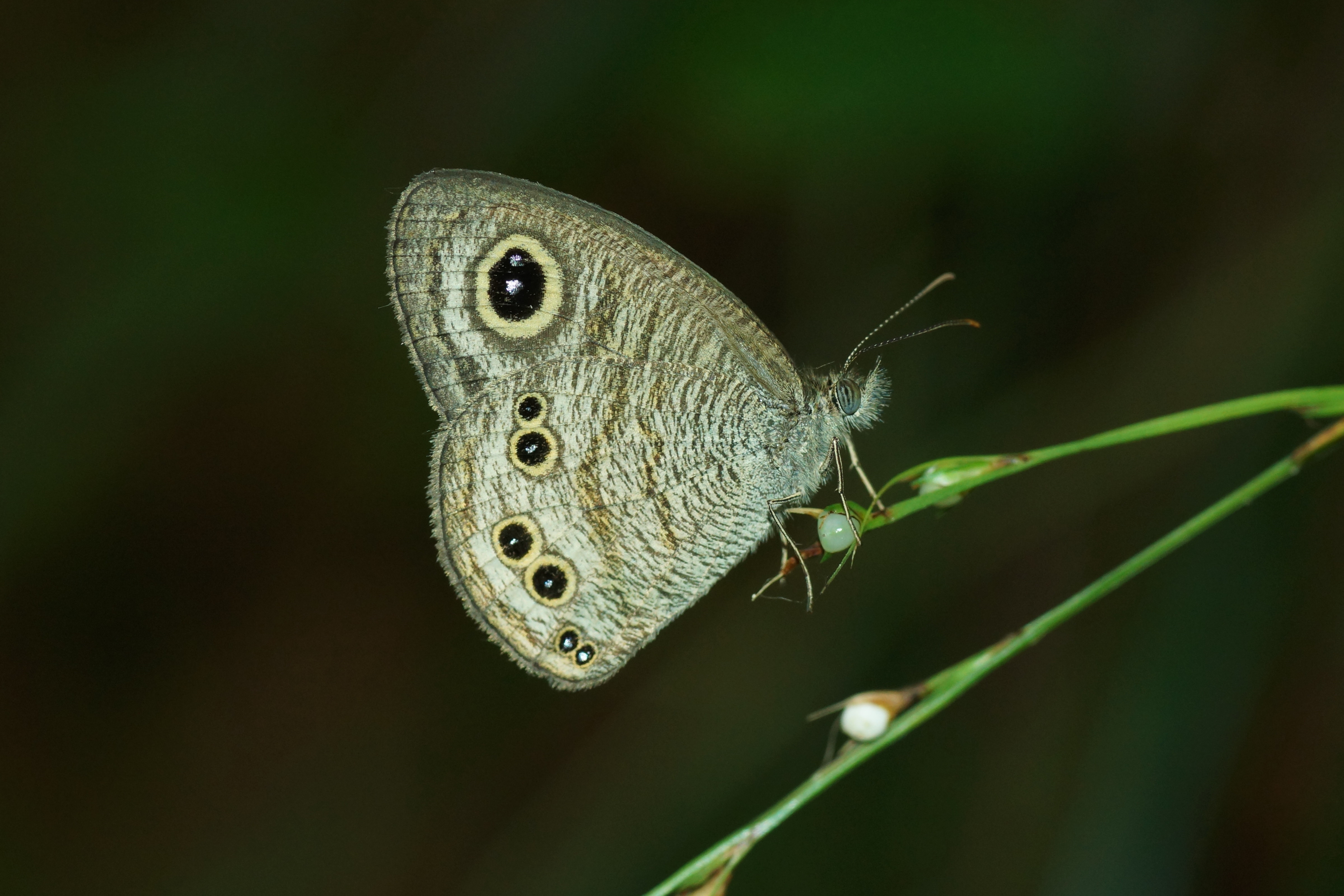
Underside, wet-season form

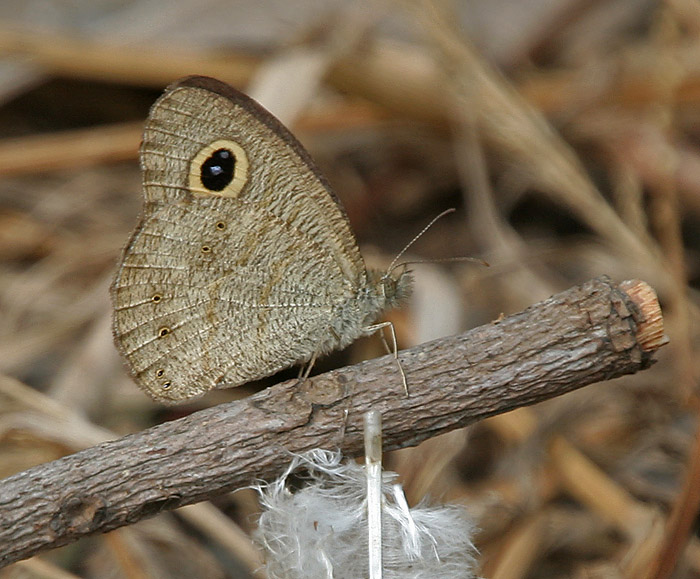
Underside, dry-season form

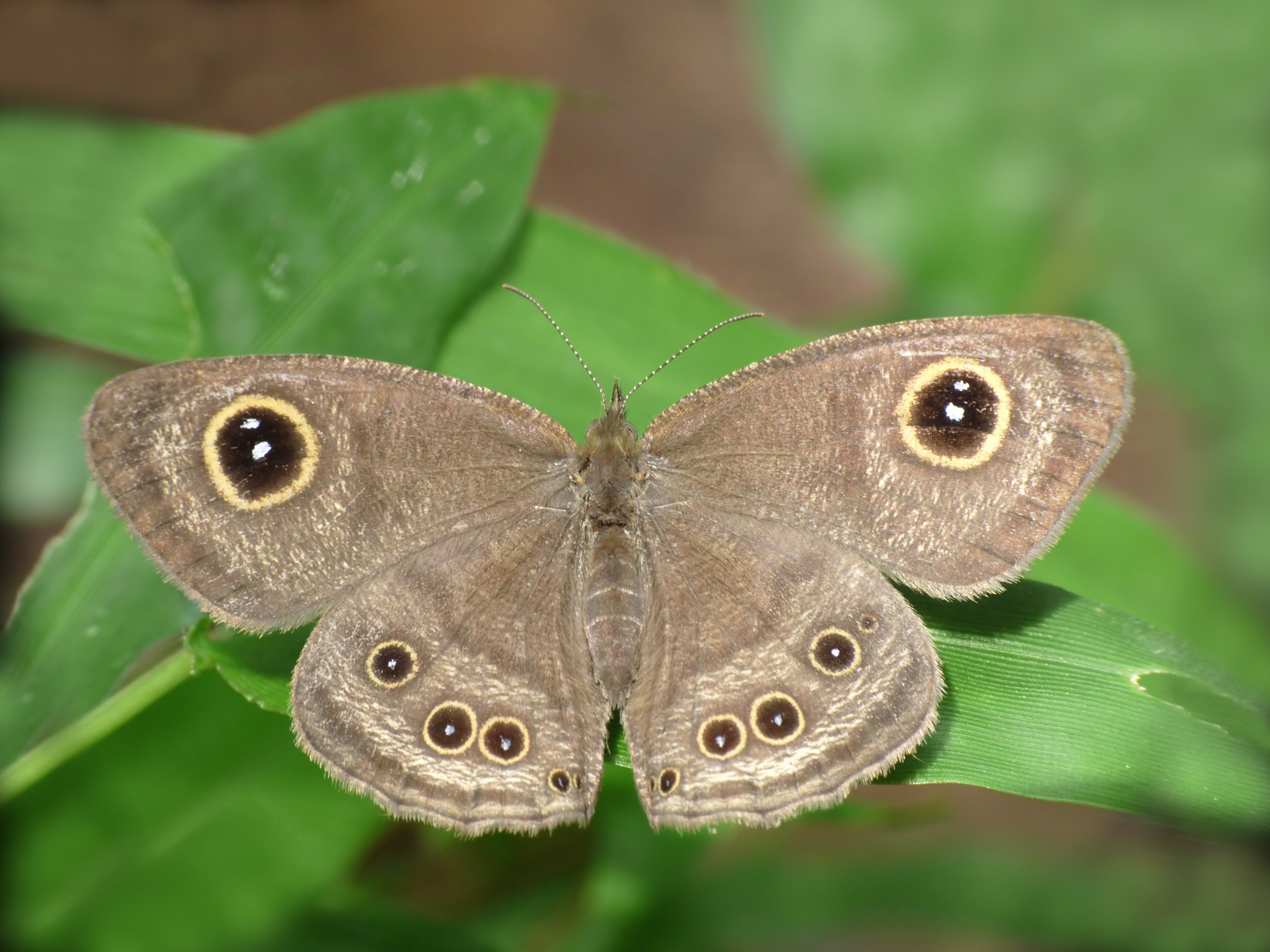
Upperside, wet-season form

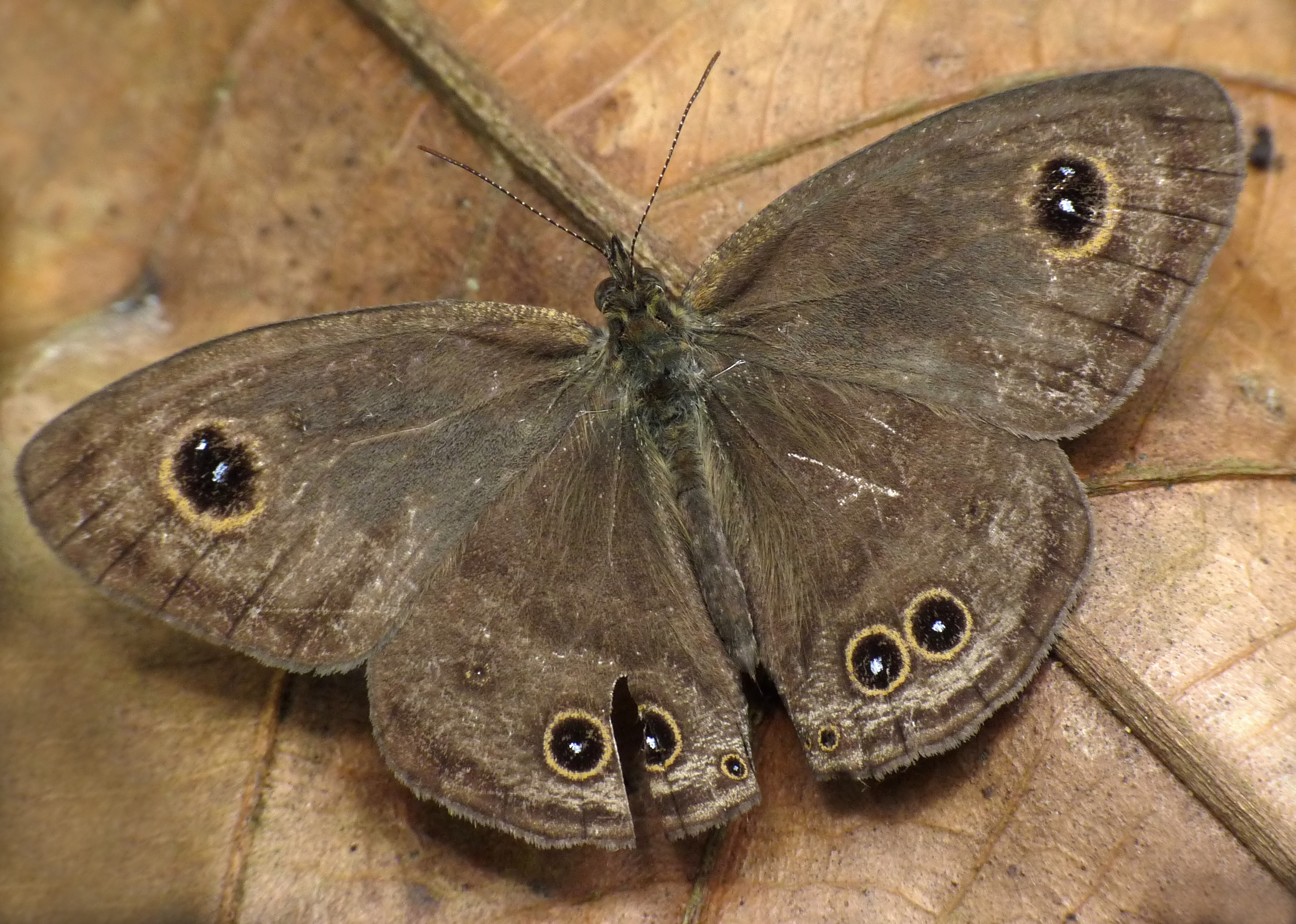
Upperside, dry-season form

== Distribution ==
Bangladesh, Nepal, Bhutan, China (mainland and Hong Kong), India (sub-Himalayan areas from Chamba to Sikkim, central India, and the hills of southern India including the Western Ghats; Assam), Indonesia (Borneo), Japan, Korean Peninsula, Malay Peninsula, Cambodia, Myanmar, Pakistan, Russia (Kuril Islands), Singapore, Taiwan, Thailand and northern Vietnam.

== Subspecies ==
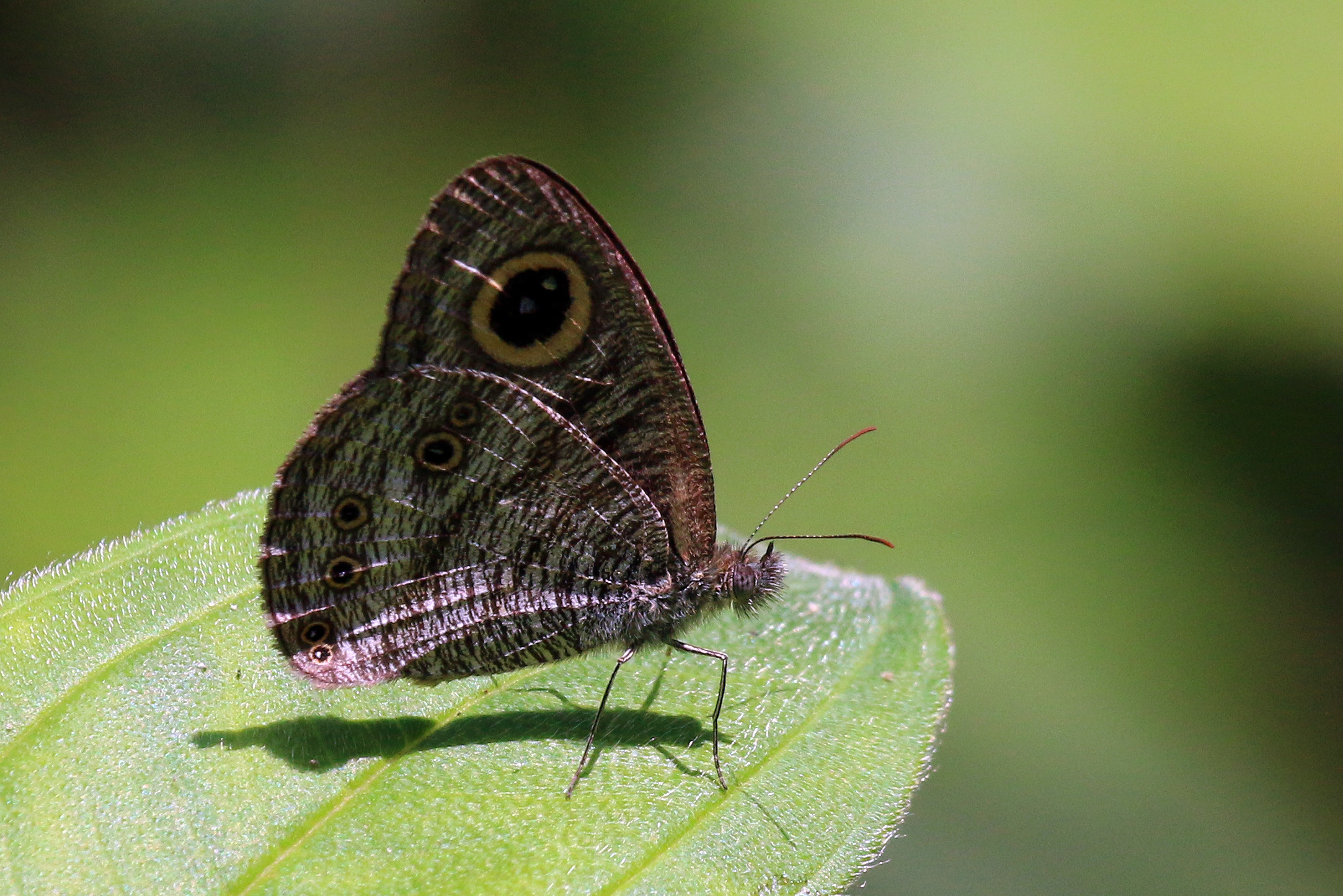
Y. b. selinuntius Sabah, Borneo, Malaysia

The species may be divided into the following subspecies:

- Ypthima baldus baldus (India to Indochina, Burma, Thailand, Cambodia and southern Yunnan)
- Ypthima baldus hyampeia Fruhstorfer, 1911 (southern Ussuri and Korea)
- Ypthima baldus jezoensis Matsumura, 1919 (Kuriles)
- Ypthima baldus luoi Huang, 1999 (Yunnan)
- Ypthima baldus marshalli Butler, 1882
- Ypthima baldus moerus Fruhstorfer, 1911
- Ypthima baldus newboldi Distant, 1882 (Peninsular Malaya, Langkawi, and Singapore)
- Ypthima baldus okurai Okano, 1962 (Taiwan)
- Ypthima baldus pasitelides Fruhstorfer, 1911 (Bawean)
- Ypthima baldus selinuntius Fruhstorfer, 1911 (Borneo and Natuna Islands)
- Ypthima baldus zodina Fruhstorfer, 1911 (Taiwan)

== See also ==
- List of butterflies of Bangladesh
- List of butterflies of China (Nymphalidae)
- List of butterflies of India
- List of butterflies of Japan
- List of butterflies of the Korean Peninsula
- List of butterflies of Pakistan
- List of butterflies of Peninsular Malaysia
- List of butterflies of Singapore
- List of butterflies of Taiwan
