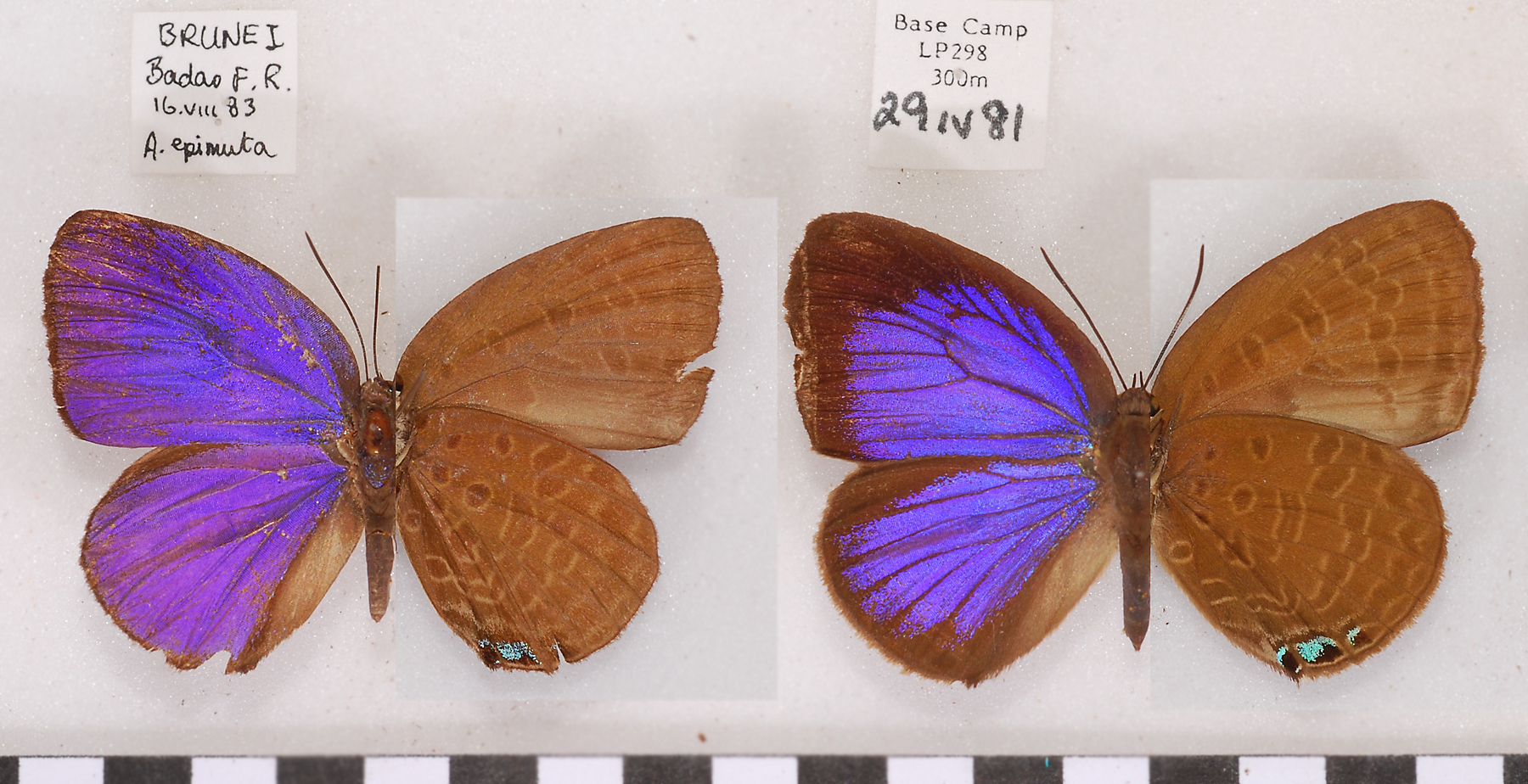

Scientific classification
- Kingdom: Animalia
- Phylum: Arthropoda
- Clade: Pancrustacea
- Class: Insecta
- Order: Lepidoptera
- Family: Lycaenidae
- Genus: Arhopala
- Species: A. epimuta

Binomial name
- Arhopala epimuta (Moore, [1858])

Synonyms
- Amblypodia epimuta Moore, [1858]; Arhopala epiala Corbet, 1941; Amblypodia elsiei Evans, [1925]

= Arhopala epimuta =

Species of butterfly

Arhopala epimuta is a species of butterfly belonging to the lycaenid family described by Frederic Moore in 1858. It is found in Southeast Asia (Burma, Thailand, Borneo, Peninsular Malaya, Singapore and Sumatra).

epimutais very similar to atosia above and beneath, but it is said to differ in the absence of the small tail of the hindwing. The male is shining pale blue, turning violet towards the apex.

== Subspecies ==
- Arhopala epimuta epimuta (Borneo)
- Arhopala epimuta epiala Corbet, 1941 (Peninsular Malaysia, Singapore, Sumatra)
- Arhopala epimuta elsiei Evans, [1925] (Burma, Thailand)
