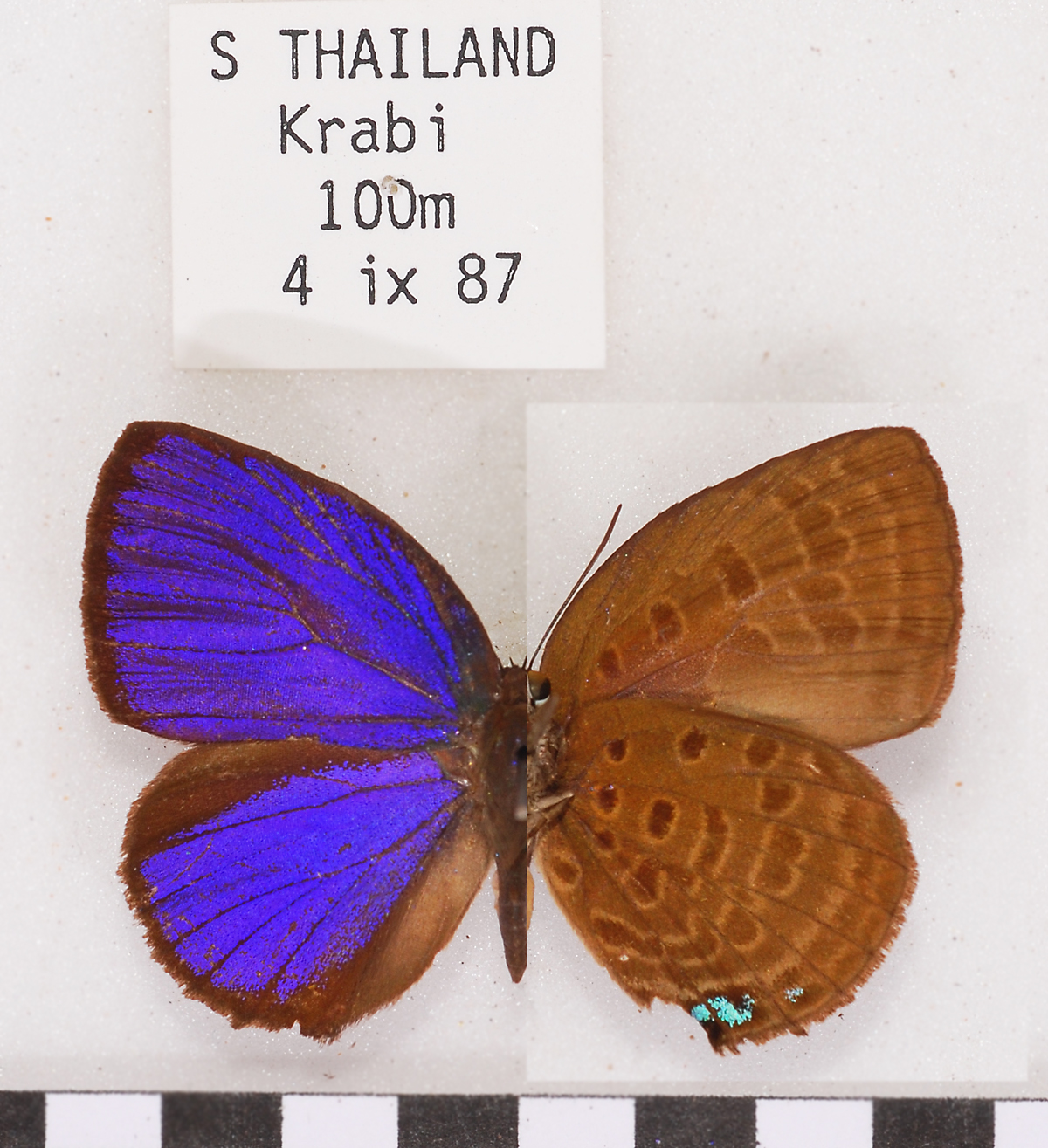
- Arhopala amphimuta milleriana

Scientific classification
- Kingdom: Animalia
- Phylum: Arthropoda
- Clade: Pancrustacea
- Class: Insecta
- Order: Lepidoptera
- Family: Lycaenidae
- Genus: Arhopala
- Species: A. amphimuta

Binomial name
- Arhopala amphimuta (C. Felder & R. Felder, 1860)

Synonyms
- Amblypodia amphimuta C. & R. Felder, 1860; Arhopala asia de Nicéville, [1893]; Arhopala milleriana Corbet, 1941; Narathura amphimuta quadra Evans, 1957

= Arhopala amphimuta =

Species of butterfly

Arhopala amphimuta is a species of butterfly belonging to the lycaenid family described by Cajetan Felder and Rudolf Felder in 1860. It is found in Southeast Asia - Peninsular Malaya, Sumatra, Borneo, Bangka, the Philippines (A. a. amphimuta), Thailand, Mergui, Burma, Langkawi, Penang (A. a. milleriana Corbet, 1941) and Java (A. a. quadra (Evans, 1957)).

Male both wings soft violet, with a brownish shade in side-lights. Forewing costa and outer margin very narrowly brown; hindwings with broad brown costa and very narrow outer margins. Underside clear ochreous brown with slightly darker spots palely encircled.At the anal angle is a very large blackish spot extending into the next nervule space and well covered with a bright pale blue metallic spot, of which there is a slight trace in the second median nervule space.

Beneath very similar to Arhopala rafflesii But it differs from it in the entire absence of the small tail on the hindwing. The male is above also darker, of a darker violettish-brown.

== Subspecies ==
- Arhopala amphimuta amphimuta (Peninsular Malaya, Sumatra, Borneo, Bangka, possibly the Philippines)
- Arhopala amphimuta milleriana Corbet, 1941 (Thailand, Mergui, S.Burma, Langkawi, Penang)
- Arhopala amphimuta quadra (Evans, 1957) (Java)
