= List of butterflies of Taiwan =

At least 377 species of butterfly have been recorded in Taiwan, with some reports putting the number at over 400. Of these, 56 species are endemic to the island. Taiwan is in the Indomalayan realm.

Following is a list of all butterflies found in Taiwan.

== Family Hesperiidae ==
=== Subfamily Coeliadinae ===
- Badamia exclamationis (Fabricius, 1775) brown awl
- Bibasis jaina formosana (Fruhstorfer, 1911) - formerly Burara
- Choaspes benjaminii formosanus (Fruhstorfer, 1911) Indian awl king
- Choaspes xanthopogon chrysopterus Hsu, 1988
- Hasora anura taiwana Hsu, Tsukiyama & Chiba, 2005 slate awl
- Hasora badra (Moore, 1858) common awl
- Hasora chromus (Cramer, 1782) banded awl
- Hasora taminatus vairacana Fruhstorfer, 1911 white-banded awl

=== Subfamily Hesperiinae ===
- Aeromachus bandaishanus Murayama & Shimonoya, 1968 ※endemic
- Aeromachus inachus formosana Matsumura, 1931
- Aeromachus matsudai (Murayama, 1943) ※endemic
- Ampittia dioscorides etura (Mabille, 1891) bush hopper
- Ampittia virgata miyakei Shonen Matsumura, 1910 striped bush hopper
- Borbo cinnara (Wallace, 1866) Formosan swift
- Caltoris bromus yanuca (Fruhstorfer, 1911) colon swift
- Caltoris cahira austeni (Moore, 1883) dark swift
- Erionota torus Evans, 1941 banana skipper
- Halpe gamma Evans, 1937
- Isoteinon lamprospilus formosanus Fruhstorfer, 1911 shiny-spotted bob
- Notocrypta curvifascia (C. & R. Felder, 1862) restricted demon
- Notocrypta feisthamelii (Boisduval, 1832)
  - N. f. alinkara Fruhstorfer, 1911
  - N. f. arisana Sonan, 1930
- Ochlodes bouddha yuchingkinus Matsuyama & Shimonoya, 1963
- Ochlodes formosanus (Matsumura, 1919) ※endemic
- Onryza maga takeuchii (Matsumura, 1929)
- Parnara bada (Moore, 1878) Oriental straight swift
- Parnara guttata (Bremer & Grey, 1852) common straight swift
- Pelopidas agna (Moore, 1866) little branded swift
- Pelopidas conjuncta (Herrich-Schäffer, 1869) conjoined swift
- Pelopidas mathias oberthueri Evans, 1937
- Pelopidas sinensis (Mabille, 1877) small branded swift
- Polytremis eltola tappana (Matsumura, 1919)
- Polytremis kiraizana (Sonan, 1938) ※endemic
- Polytremis lubricans taiwana Matsumura, 1919 contiguous swift ※endemic
- Polytremis theca asahinai Shirozu, 1952
- Polytremis zina taiwana Murayama, 1981
- Potanthus confucius angustatus (Matsumura, 1910) Chinese dart
- Potanthus diffusus Hsu, Tsukiyama & Chiba, 2005
- Potanthus motzui Hsu, Li, & Li, 1990 ※endemic
- Potanthus pava (Fruhstorfer, 1911) yellow band dart
- Potanthus wilemanni (Evans, 1934) ※endemic
- Pseudoborbo bevani (Moore, 1878)
- Suastus gremius (Fabricius, 1798) Indian palm bob
- Telicota bambusae horisha Evans, 1934
- Telicota colon bayashikeii Tsukiyama, Chiba & Fujioka, 1997 pale palm dart
- Telicota ohara formosana Fruhstorfer, 1911 dark palm dart
- Thoressa horishana (Matsumura, 1910) ※endemic
- Udaspes folus (Cramer, 1775) grass demon

=== Subfamily Pyrginae ===
- Abraximorpha davidii ermasis Fruhstorfer, 1914 magpie flat
- Celaenorrhinus chihhsiaoi Hsu, 1990 ※endemic
- Celaenorrhinus horishanus Shirozu, 1960 ※endemic
- Celaenorrhinus kurosawai Shirozu, 1960 ※endemic
- Celaenorrhinus maculosus (C. & R. Felder, 1919)
- Celaenorrhinus osculus major Hsu, 1990
- Celaenorrhinus pulomaya formosanus Fruhstorfer, 1909
- Celaenorrhinus ratna Fruhstorfer, 1908
- Coladenia pinsbukana (Shimonoya & Murayama, 1976) ※endemic
- Daimio tethys niitakana Matsumura, 1907
- Lobocla bifasciata kodairai Sonan, 1936
- Pseudocoladenia dan sadakoe (Sonan & Mitono, 1936)
- Satarupa formosibia Strand, 1927 ※endemic
- Satarupa majasra Fruhstorfer, 1910
- Seseria formosana (Fruhstorfer, 1909) ※endemic
- Tagiades cohaerens Mabille, 1914
- Tagiades trebellius martinus Plotz, 1884

== Family Papilionidae ==
=== Subfamily Papilioninae ===
==== Tribe Leptocircini ====
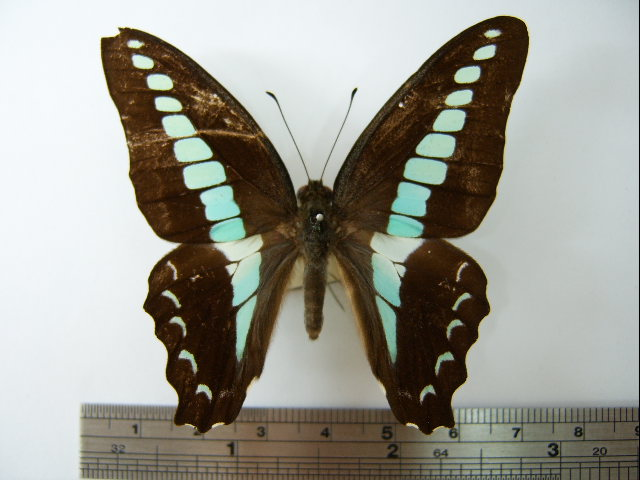
G. s. connectens

- Graphium agamemnon (Linneaeus, 1758) tailed jay
- Graphium cloanthus kuge (Fruhstorfer, 1908) glassy bluebottle
- Graphium doson postianum (Fruhstorfer, 1908) common jay
- Graphium sarpedon connectens (Fruhstorfer, 1906) common bluebottle
- Pazala eurous asakurae (Matsumura, 1908)
- Graphium mullah Pazala timur chungianum (Murayama, 1961)

==== Tribe Papilionini ====
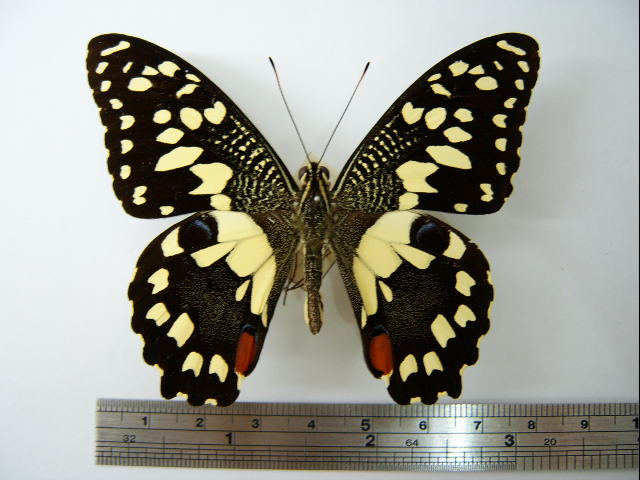
Papilio demoleus male

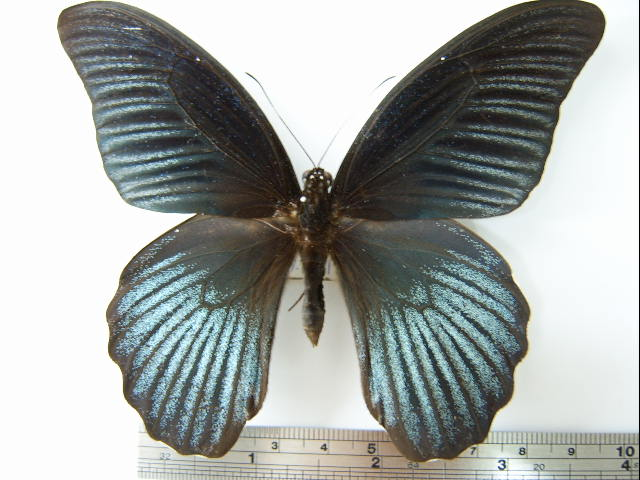
P. m. heronus male

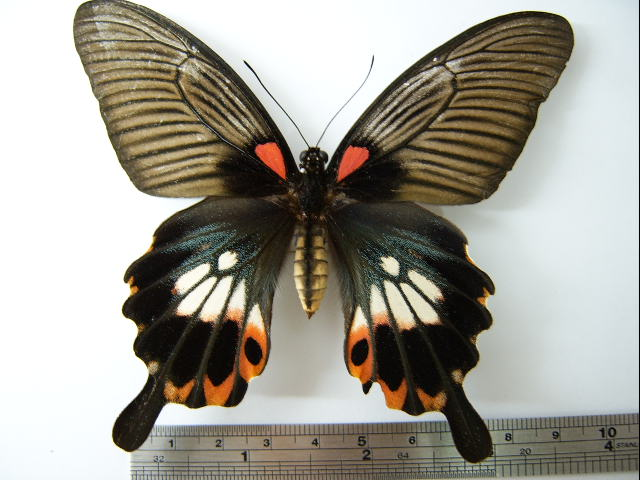
P. m. heronus female

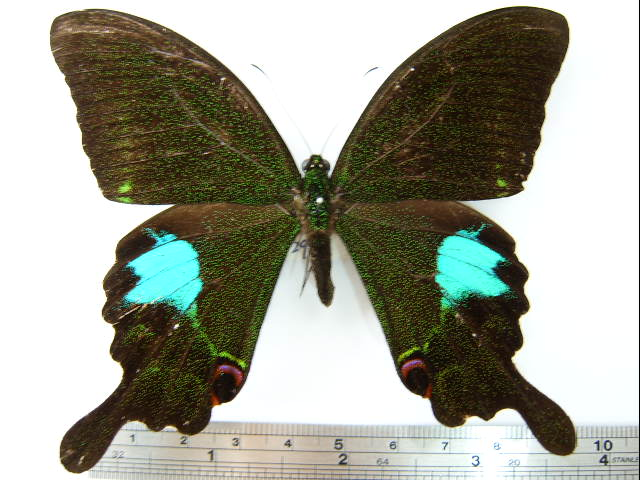
P. p. nakaharai male

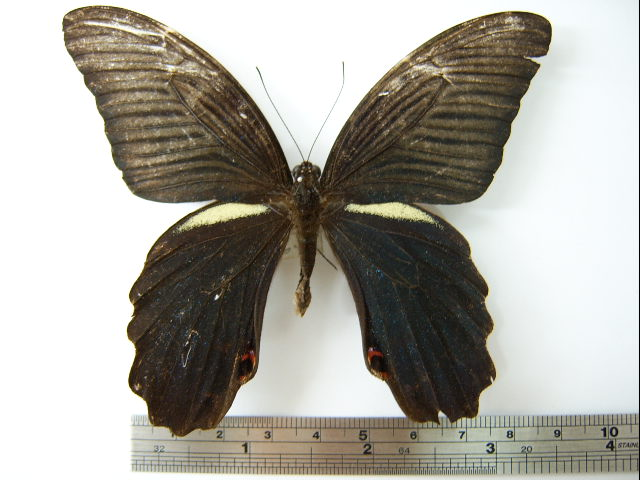
Papilio protenor male

- Papilio maraho (Shiraki & Sonan, 1934) ※endemic
- Papilio agestor matsumurae (Fruhstorfer, 1909) tawny mime
- Papilio bianor Cramer, 1777 Chinese peacock
  - P. b. kotoensis Sonan, 1927
  - P. b. thrasymedes Fruhstorfer 1909
- Papilio castor formosanus Rothschild, 1896
- Papilio demoleus Linnaeus, 1758 lime butterfly
- Papilio dialis tatsuta Murayama, 1970 southern Chinese peacock
- Papilio epycides melanoleucus (Ney, 1911)
- Papilio helenus fortunius Fruhstorfer, 1908 red Helen
- Papilio paris hermosanus Rebel, 1906
- Papilio hoppo Matsumura, 1907 ※endemic
- Papilio machaon sylvina Hemming, 1933
- Papilio memnon heronus Fruhstorfer, 1903 great Mormon
- Papilio nephelus chaonulus Fruhstorfer, 1908
- Papilio paris nakaharai Shirozu, 1960 Paris peacock
- Papilio polytes Linnaeus, 1758 common Mormon
  - P. p. ledebouria Eschscholtz, 1821 ※vagrant
  - P. p. pasikrates Fruhstorfer, 1908
  - P. p. polytes Linnaeus, 1758 ※vagrant
- Papilio protenor Cramer, 1775 spangle
- Papilio rumanzovia Eschscholtz, 1821 ※vagrant
- Papilio taiwanus Rothschild, 1898 ※endemic
- Papilio xuthus Linnaeus, 1767 Asian swallowtail

==== Tribe Troidini ====
- Atrophaneura horishana (Matsumura, 1910) ※endemic
- Atrophaneura semperi (C.& R. Felder, 1861) ※vagrant
- Byasa alcinous mansonensis (Fruhstorfer, 1901)
- Byasa impediens febanus (Fruhstorfer, 1908)
- Byasa polyeuctes termessus (Fruhstorfer, 1908)
- Pachliopta aristolochiae interpositus (Fruhstorfer, 1901) common rose
- Troides aeacus formosanus Rothschild, 1899 golden birdwing
- Troides magellanus sonani Matsumura, 1932
- Troides plateni (Staudinger, 1889) ※vagrant

== Family Pieridae ==
=== Subfamily Coliadinae ===
- Catopsilia pomona (Fabricius, 1775) lemon emigrant
- Catopsilia pyranthe (Linnaeus, 1758) mottled emigrant
- Catopsilia scylla cornelia (Fabricius, 1787) ※exotic
- Colias erate formosana Shirozu, 1955
- Eurema alitha esakii Shirozu, 1953
- Eurema andersonii godana (Fruhstorfer, 1910)
- Eurema blanda arsakia (Fruhstorfer, 1910) three-spot grass yellow
- Eurema brigitta hainana (Moore, 1878) small grass yellow
- Eurema hecabe (Linnaeus, 1758) common grass yellow
- Eurema laeta punctissima (Matsumura, 1909) spotless grass yellow
- Gonepteryx amintha formosana (Fruhstorfer, 1908)
- Gonepteryx taiwana Paravicini, 1913 ※endemic

=== Subfamily Pierinae ===
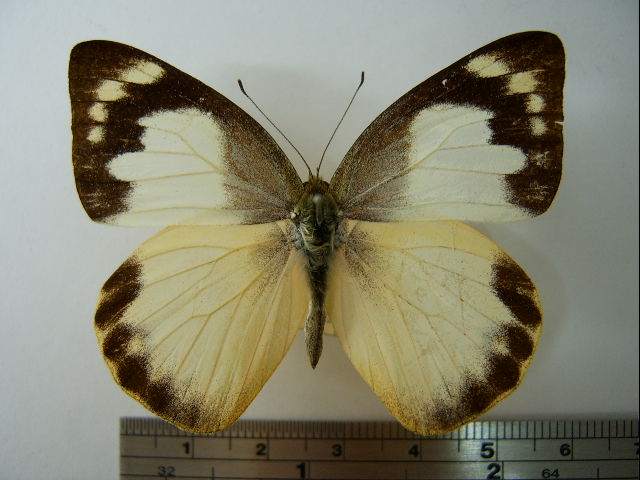
A. a. semperi female

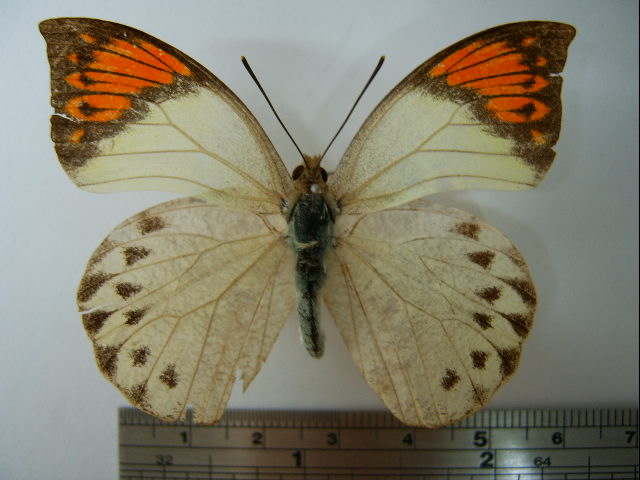
H. g. formosana female

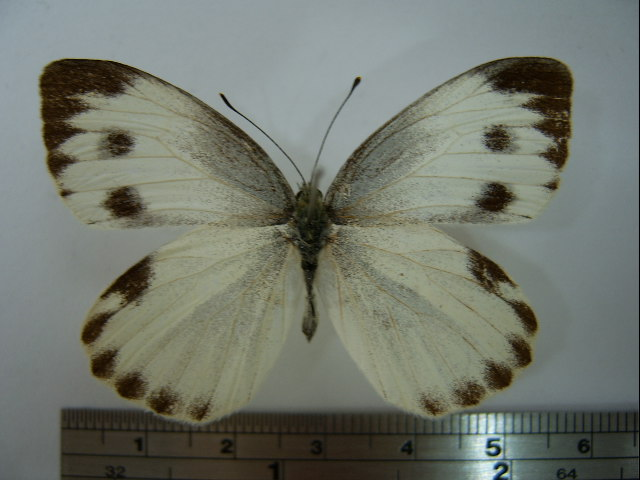
Pieris canidia female

- Aporia agathon moltrechti (Oberthür, 1909)
- Aporia gigantea cheni Hsu & Chou, 1999
- Aporia potanini insularis Shirozu, 1959
- Appias albina semperi (Moore, 1905) common albatross
- Appias indra aristoxemus Fruhstorfer, 1908
- Appias lyncida formosana (Wallace, 1866) chocolate albatross
- Appias nero domitia (C. & R. Felder, 1862) ※vagrant
- Appias olferna peducaea Fruhstorfer, 1910 ※vagrant
- Appias paulina minato (Fruhstorfer, 1898)
- Cepora aspasia olga (Eschscholtz, 1821) ※exotic
- Cepora coronis cibyra (Fruhstorfer, 1910) common gullwing
- Cepora nandina eunama (Fruhstorfer, 1903)
- Delias berinda wilemani Jordan, 1925
- Delias hyparete luzonensis C. & R. Felder, 1862 painted Jezebel
- Delias lativitta formosana Matsumura, 1909
- Delias pasithoe curasena Fruhstorfer, 1908 red-base Jezebel
- Hebomoia glaucippe formosana Fruhstorfer, 1908 great orange tip
- Ixias pyrene insignis Butler, 1879 yellow orange tip
- Leptosia nina niobe (Wallace, 1866)
- Pieris canidia (Sparrman, 1768) Indian cabbage white
- Pieris rapae crucivora Boisduval, 1836 cabbage white
- Prioneris thestylis formosana Fruhstorfer, 1908 spotted sawtooth
- Saletara panda nathalia (C. & R. Felder, 1862) ※vagrant
- Talbotia naganum karumii (Ikeda, 1937) Naga white

== Family Riodinidae ==
- Abisara burnii etymander (Fruhstorfer, 1908)
- Dodona eugenes (Guerin, 1843)
  - D. e. esakii Shirozu, 1952
  - D. e. formosana Matsumura, 1919

== Family Lycaenidae ==
=== Subfamily Curetinae ===
- Curetis acuta formosana Fruhstorfer, 1908
- Curetis brunnea Wileman, 1909 ※endemic

=== Subfamily Lycaeninae ===
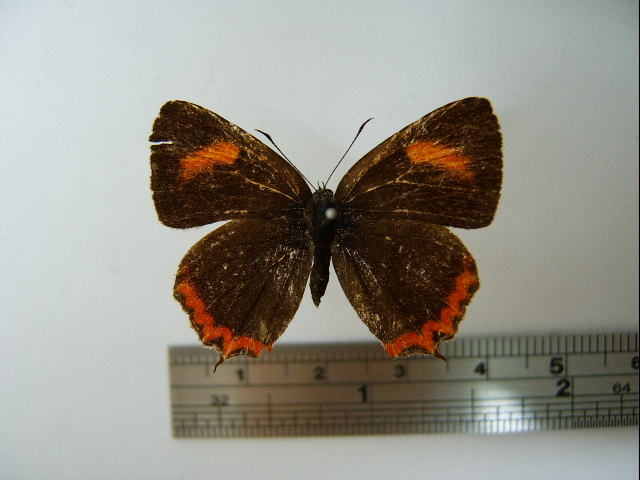
H. i. matsumurae female

- Heliophorus ila matsumurae (Fruhstorfer, 1908)

=== Subfamily Miletinae ===
==== Tribe Spalgini ====
- Spalgis epeus dilama (Moore, 1878)

==== Tribe Tarakini ====
- Taraka hamada thalaba Fruhstorfer, 1922

=== Subfamily Polyommatinae ===
==== Tribe Polyommatini ====
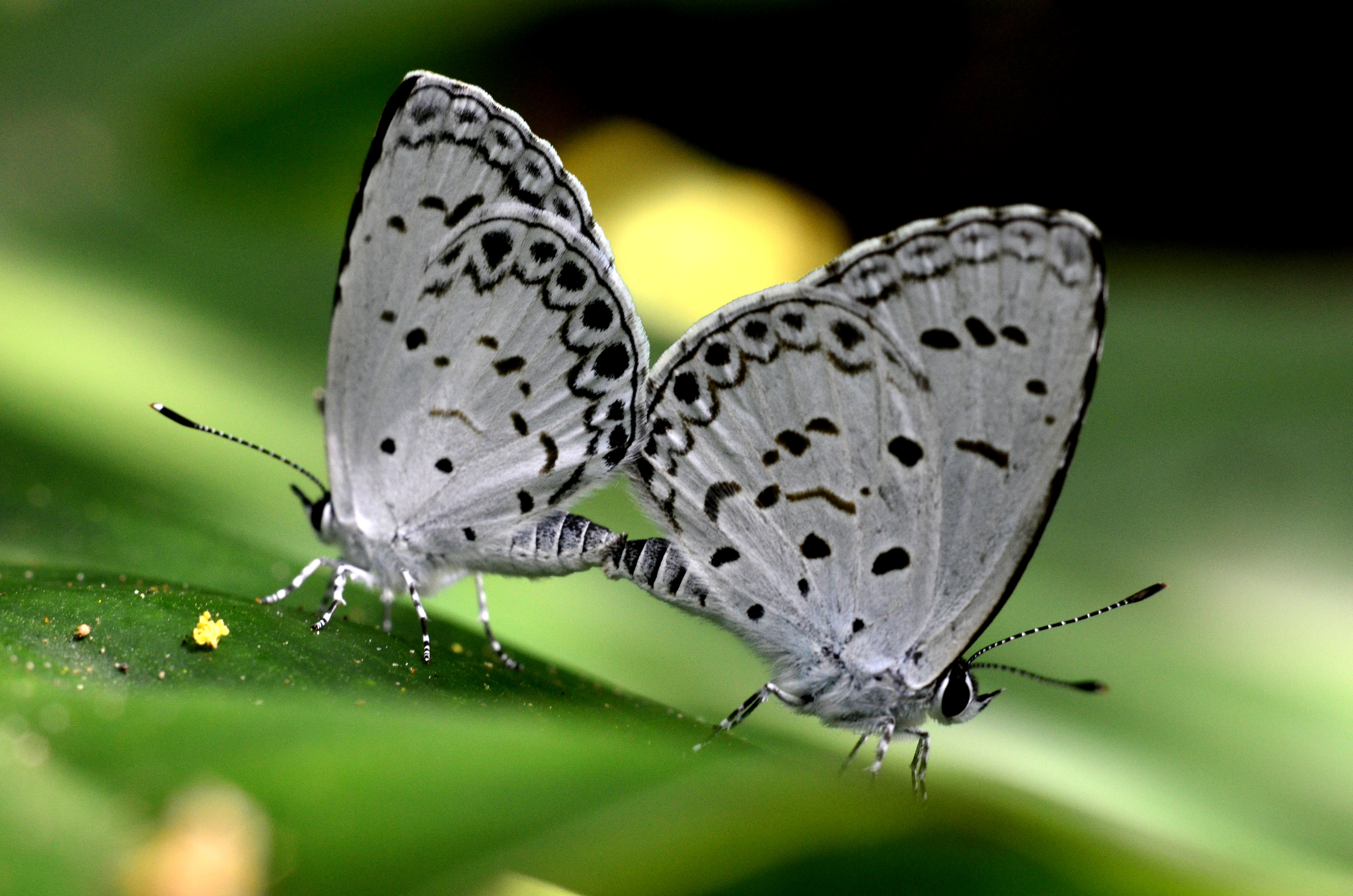
Acytolepis puspa myla

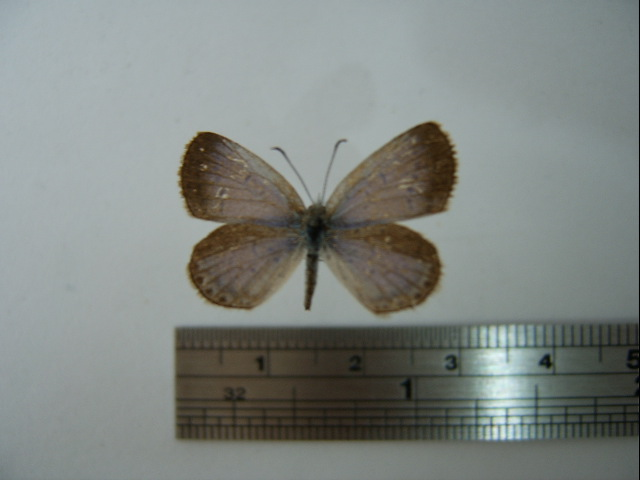
Z. m. okinawana

- Acytolepis puspa myla (Fruhstorfer, 1909)
- Callenya melaena shonen (Esaki, 1932)
- Catochrysops panormus exiguus (Distant, 1886)
- Catochrysops strabo luzonensis Tite, 1959
- Catopyrops ancyra almora (Druce, 1873) ※exotic
- Celastrina argiolus caphis (Fruhstorfer, 1922)
- Celastrina lavendularis himilcon (Fruhstorfer, 1909)
- Celastrina oreas arisana (Matsumura, 1910)
- Celastrina sugitanii shirozui Hsu, 1987
- Celatoxia marginata (de Niceville, 1884)
- Chilades lajus koshunensis Matsumura, 1919
- Danis schaeffera (Eschscholtz, 1821) ※vagrant
- Euchrysops cnejus (Fabricius, 1798)
- Everes argiades hellotia (Menetries, 1857)
- Everes lacturnus rileyi Godfrey, 1916
- Famegana alsulus taiwana (Sonan, 1938) ※extinct
- Freyeria putli formosanus (Matsumura, 1919)
- Jamides alecto dromicus Fruhstorfer, 1910
- Jamides bochus formosanus Fruhstorfer, 1909
- Jamides celeno (Cramer, 1775)
- Lampides boeticus (Linnaeus, 1767)
- Luthrodes peripatria (Hsu, 1989)
- Megisba malaya sikkima Moore, 1884
- Nacaduba berenice leei Hsu, 1990
- Nacaduba beroe asakusa Fruhstorfer, 1916
- Nacaduba kurava therasia Fruhstorfer, 1916
- Nacaduba pactolus hainani Bethune-Baker, 1914
- Neopithecops zalmora (Butler, 1869)
- Orthomiella rantaizana (Wileman, 1910)
- Phengaris atroguttata formosana (Matsumura, 1926)
- Phengaris daitozana Wileman, 1908 ※endemic
- Pithecops corvus cornix Cowan, 1965
- Pithecops fulgens urai Bethune-Baker, 1913
- Prosotas nora formosana (Fruhstorfer, 1916)
- Shijimia moorei (Leech, 1889)
- Syntarucus plinius (Fabricius, 1793)
- Tongeia filicaudis mushanus (Tanikawa, 1940)
- Tongeia hainani (Bethune-Baker, 1914) ※endemic
- Udara albocaerulea (Moore, 1879)
- Udara dilecta (Moore, 1879)
- Zizeeria karsandra (Moore, 1865)
- Zizeeria maha okinawana (Matsumura, 1929)
- Zizina otis riukuensis (Matsumura, 1929)
- Zizula hylax (Fabricius, 1775)

=== Subfamily Aphnaeinae ===
- Cigaritis kuyaniana (Matsumura, 1919) ※endemic
- Cigaritis lohita formosana (Moore, 1877)
- Cigaritis syama (Horsfield, 1829)

=== Subfamily Theclinae ===
==== Tribe Arhopalini ====
- Arhopala bazalus turbata (Butler, 1881)
- Arhopala birmana asakurae (Matsumura, 1910)
- Arhopala ganesa formosana Kato, 1930
- Arhopala japonica (Murray, 1875)
- Arhopala paramuta horishana Matsumura, 1910
- Mahathala ameria hainani Bethune-Baker, 1903

==== Tribe Catapaecilmatini ====
- Catapaecilma major moltrechti (Wileman, 1908)

==== Tribe Deudorigini ====
- Artipe eryx horiella (Matsumura, 1929)
- Deudorix epijarbas menesicles Fruhstorfer, 1911
- Deudorix rapaloides (Naritomi, 1911)
- Deudorix repercussa sankakuhonis Matsumura, 1938
- Rapala caerulea liliacea Nire, 1920
- Rapala nissa hirayamana Matsumura, 1926
- Rapala takasagonis Matsumura, 1929 ※endemic
- Rapala varuna formosana Fruhstorfer, 1911
- Sinthusa chandrana kuyaniana (Matsumura, 1919)

==== Tribe Eumaeini ====
- Fixsenia watarii (Matsumura, 1927) ※endemic
- Satyrium austrinum (Murayama, 1943)
- Satyrium esakii (Shirozu, 1942) ※endemic
- Satyrium eximium mushanum (Matsumura, 1929)
- Satyrium formosanum (Matsumura, 1910)
- Satyrium inouei (Shirozu, 1959)
- Satyrium tanakai (Shirozu, 1943) ※endemic

==== Tribe Horagini ====
- Horaga albimacula triumphalis Murayama & Sibatani, 1943
- Horaga onyx moltrechti Matsumura, 1919
- Horaga rarasana Sonan, 1936 ※endemic

==== Tribe Hypolycaenini ====
- Hypolycaena othona Hewitson, 1865 ※extinct
- Hypolycaena kina inari (Wileman, 1908)

==== Tribe Iolaini ====
- Tajuria caerulea Nire, 1920 ※endemic
- Tajuria diaeus karenkonis Matsumura, 1929
- Tajuria illurgis tattaka (Araki, 1949)

==== Tribe Remelanini ====
- Ancema ctesia cakravasti (Fruhstorfer, 1909)

==== Tribe Theclini ====
- Amblopala avidiena y-fasciata (Sonan, 1929)
- Antigius attilia obsoletus (Takeuchi, 1923)
- Araragi enthea morisonensis (M. Inoue, 1942)
- Chrysozephyrus ataxus lingi Okano & Okura, 1969
- Chrysozephyrus disparatus pseudotaiwanus (Howarth, 1957)
- Chrysozephyrus esakii (Sonan, 1940)
- Chrysozephyrus kabrua niitakanus (Kano, 1928)
- Chrysozephyrus mushaellus (Matsumura, 1938)
- Chrysozephyrus nishikaze (Araki & Sibatani, 1886) ※endemic
- Chrysozephyrus rarasanus (Matsumura, 1939)
- Chrysozephyrus splendidulus Murayama, 1965 ※endemic
- Chrysozephyrus yuchingkinus Murayama & Shimonoya, 1965 ※endemic
- Cordelia comes wilemaniella (Matsumura, 1929)
- Euaspa forsteri (Esaki & Shirozu, 1943)
- Euaspa milionia formosana Nomura, 1931
- Euaspa tayal (Esaki & Shirozu, 1943)
- Iratsume orsedice suzukii (Sonan, 1940)
- Japonica patungkoanui Matsumura, 1956 ※endemic
- Leucantigius atayalicus (Shirozu & Murayama, 1943)
- Neozephyrus taiwanus (Wileman, 1908) ※endemic
- Ravenna nivea (Nire, 1920)
- Sibataniozephyrus kuafui Hsu & Lin, 1994 ※endemic
- Teratozephyrus arisanus (Wileman, 1909)
- Teratozephyrus elatus Hsu & Lu, 2005
- Teratozephyrus yugaii (Kano, 1928) ※endemic
- Ussuriana michaelis takarana (Araki & Hirayama, 1941)
- Wagimo sulgeri insularis (Shirozu, 1957)

== Family Nymphalidae ==
=== Subfamily Apaturinae ===
- Chitoria chrysolora (Fruhstorfer, 1908)
- Chitoria ulupi arakii (Naritomi, 1959)
- Helcyra plesseni (Fruhstorfer, 1912) ※endemic
- Helcyra superba takamukui Matsumura, 1919
- Hestina assimilis formosana (Moore, 1895) red ring skirt
- Sasakia charonda formosana Shirozu, 1963
- Sephisa chandra androdamas Fruhstorfer, 1908 eastern courtier
- Sephisa daimio Matsumura, 1910 ※endemic
- Timelaea albescens formosana Fruhstorfer, 1908

=== Subfamily Biblidinae ===
- Ariadne ariadne pallidior (Fruhstorfer, 1899) angled castor

=== Subfamily Calinaginae ===
- Calinaga buddha formosana Fruhstorfer, 1908

=== Subfamily Charaxinae ===
- Polyura eudamippus formosana (Rothschild, 1899) great nawab
- Polyura narcaea meghaduta (Fruhstorfer, 1908)

=== Subfamily Cyrestinae ===
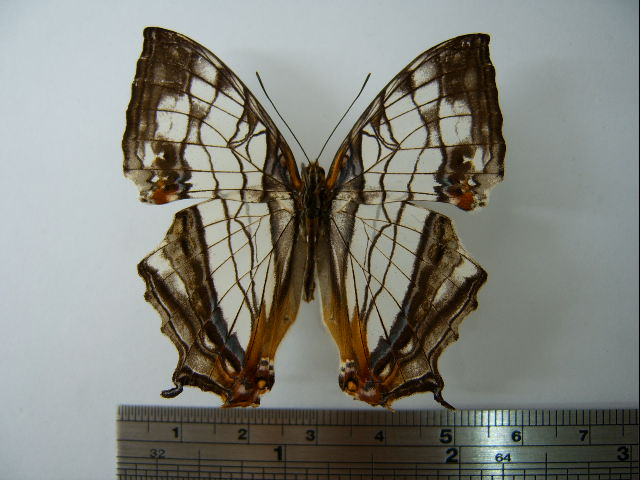
C. t. formosana

- Cyrestis thyodamas formosana Fruhstorfer, 1898 common map
- Dichorragia nesimachus formosanus Fruhstorfer, 1909 constable

=== Subfamily Danainae ===
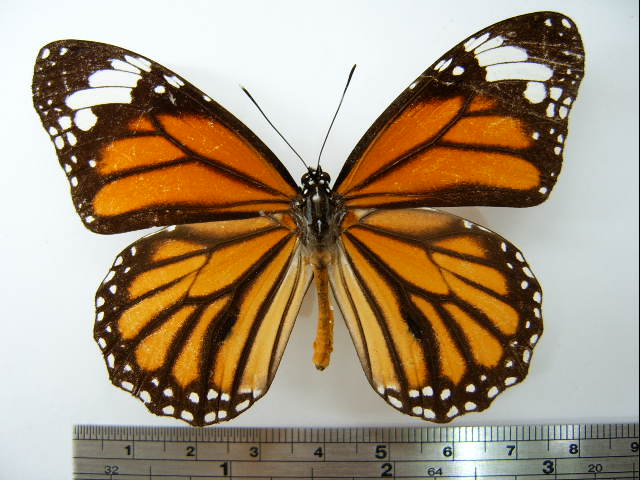
Danaus genutia male

- Danaus chrysippus (Linnaeus, 1758) plain tiger
- Danaus genutia (Cramer, 1779) common tiger
- Danaus melanippus edmondii (Bougainville, 1837) ※vagrant
- Danaus plexippus (Linnaeus, 1758) ※extirpated
- Euploea camaralzeman cratis Butler, 1866 ※vagrant
- Euploea core godartii Lucas, 1853 common Indian crow ※vagrant
- Euploea eunice (Godart, 1819)
  - E. e. hobsoni (Butler, 1877)
  - E. e. kadu Eschscholtz, 1821 ※vagrant
- Euploea klugii Moore, 1858 ※vagrant
- Euploea mulciber barsine Fruhstorfer, 1904 striped blue crow
- Euploea phaenareta juvia Fruhstorfer, 1908 ※extinct
- Euploea swainson (Godart, 1824) ※vagrant
- Euploea sylvester swinhoei Wallace & Moore, 1866 double-branded black crow
- Euploea tulliolus (Fabricius, 1793)
  - E. t. koxinga Fruhstorfer, 1908
  - E. t. pollita Erichson, 1834 ※vagrant
- Idea leuconoe Erichson, 1834
  - I. l. clara (Butler, 1867)
  - I. l. kwashotoensis (Sonan, 1928)
- Ideopsis similis (Linnaeus, 1758) Ceylon blue glassy tiger
- Parantica aglea maghaba (Fruhstorfer, 1909) glassy tiger
- Parantica luzonensis (C. & R. Felder, 1863) ※vagrant
- Parantica sita niphonica (Moore, 1883) chestnut tiger
- Parantica swinhoei (Moore, 1883) Swinhoe's chocolate tiger
- Tirumala hamata orientalis (Semper, 1879) ※vagrant
- Tirumala limniace (Cramer, 1775) blue tiger
  - T. l. limniace (Cramer, 1775)
  - T. l. orestilla (Fruhstorfer, 1910) ※vagrant
- Tirumala septentrionis (Butler, 1874) dark blue tiger

=== Subfamily Heliconiinae ===
- Acraea issoria formosana (Fruhstorfer, 1912) yellow coster
- Argynnis paphia formosicola Matsumura, 1927
- Argynnis hyperbius (Linnaeus, 1763) Indian fritillary
- Boloria pales yangi Hsu & Yen, 1997 ※extinct
- Cupha erymanthis (Drury, 1773) rustic
- Paduca fasciata (C.& R. Felder, 1860) ※vagrant
- Phalanta phalantha (Drury, 1773) common leopard ※exotic
- Vindula dejone (Erichson, 1834) ※vagrant

=== Subfamily Limenitidinae ===
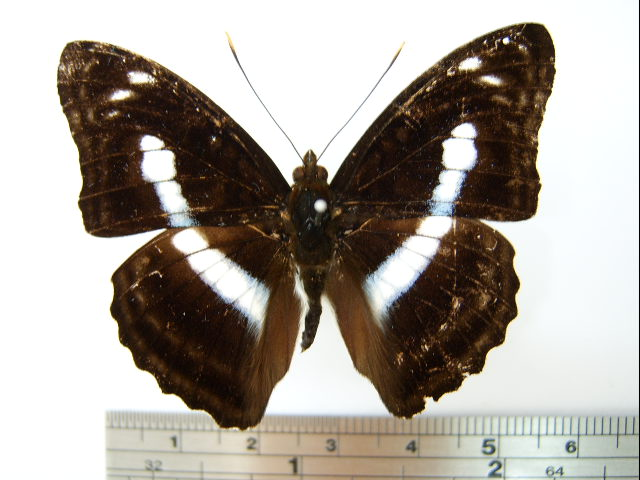
A. s. laela male

- Abrota ganga formosana Fruhstorfer, 1908
- Aldania ilos nirei Nomura, 1935
- Athyma asura baelia (Fruhstorfer, 1908)
- Athyma cama zoroastes (Butler, 1877)
- Athyma fortuna kodahirai (Sonan, 1938)
- Athyma jina sauteri (Fruhstorfer, 1912)
- Athyma opalina hirayamai (Matsumura, 1935)
- Athyma perius (Linnaeus, 1758)
- Athyma selenophora laela (Fruhstorfer, 1908)
- Athyma sulpitia tricula (Fruhstorfer, 1908)
- Euthalia formosana Fruhstorfer, 1908 ※endemic
- Euthalia hebe kosempona Fruhstorfer, 1908
- Euthalia irrubescens fulguralis (Matsumura, 1909)
- Euthalia malapana Shirozu & Chung, 1958 ※endemic
- Euthalia insulae Hall, 1930
- Neptis hesione podarces Nire, 1920
- Neptis hylas luculenta Fruhstorfer, 1907
- Neptis nata lutatia Fruhstorfer, 1913
- Neptis noyala ikedai Shirozu, 1952
- Neptis philyra splendens Murayama, 1942
- Neptis philyroides sonani Murayama, 1942
- Neptis pryeri jucundita Fruhstorfer, 1908
- Neptis reducta Fruhstorfer, 1908 ※endemic
- Neptis sankara shirakiana Matsumura, 1929
- Neptis sappho formosana Fruhstorfer, 1908
- Neptis soma tayalina Murayama & Shimonoya, 1968
- Neptis sylvana esakii Nomura, 1935
- Neptis taiwana Fruhstorfer, 1908 ※endemic
- Pantoporia hordonia rihodona (Moore, 1878)
- Parasarpa dudu jinamitra (Fruhstorfer, 1908)
- Parthenos silvia philippensis Fruhstorfer, 1898

=== Subfamily Libytheinae ===
- Libythea celtis formosana Fruhstorfer, 1909
- Libythea geoffroy philippina Staudinger, 1889 ※vagrant

=== Subfamily Morphinae ===
- Discophora sondaica (Boisduval, 1836) large faun – ※exotic
- Faunis eumeus (Drury, 1773) common duffer ※exotic
- Stichophthalma howqua formosana Fruhstorfer, 1908

=== Subfamily Nymphalinae ===
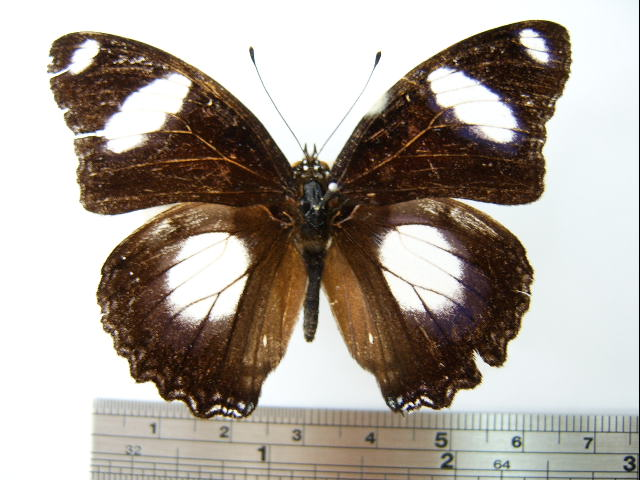
Hypolimnas misippus male

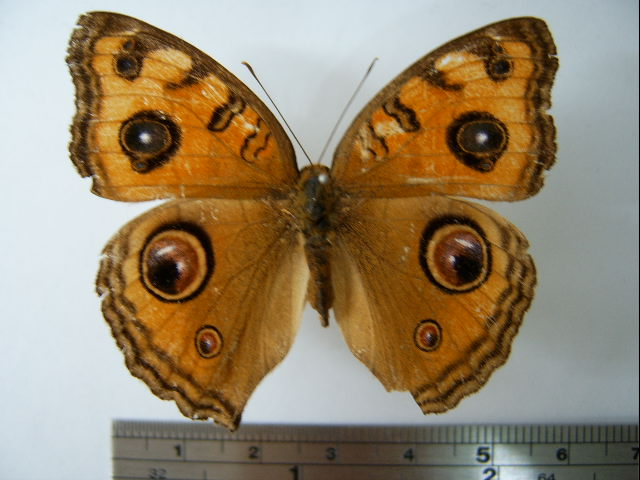
Junonia almana

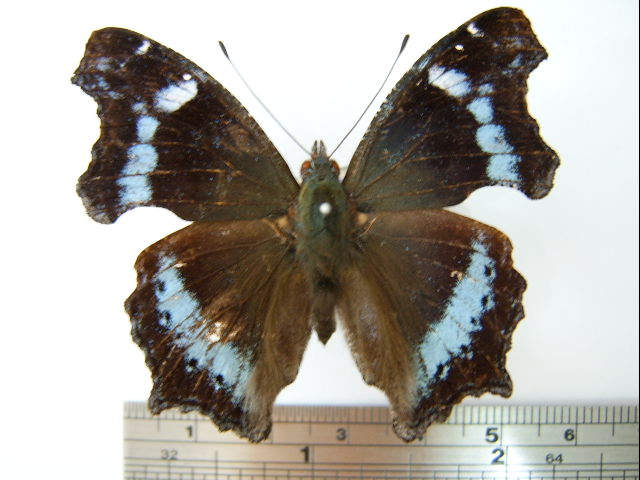
K. c. drilon

- Doleschallia bisaltide philippensis Fruhstorfer, 1899 ※vagrant
- Hypolimnas anomala Wallace, 1869 Malayan egg-fly ※exotic
- Hypolimnas bolina (Linnaeus, 1758) great egg-fly
  - H. b. jacintha (Drury, 1773) ※exotic
  - H. b. kezia (Butler, 1877)
- Hypolimnas misippus (Linnaeus, 1764) Danaid egg-fly
- Junonia almana (Linnaeus, 1758) peacock pansy
- Junonia atlites (Linnaeus, 1758) grey pansy ※exotic
- Junonia hedonia ida (Cramer, 1776) yellow pansy ※vagrant
- Junonia iphita (Cramer, 1779) chocolate pansy
- Junonia lemonias aenaria Tsukada & Kaneko, 1985 lemon pansy
- Junonia orithya (Linnaeus, 1758) blue pansy
- Kallima inachus formosana Fruhstorfer, 1912 orange oakleaf
- Kaniska canace drilon (Fruhstorfer, 1908) blue admiral
- Nymphalis xanthomelas formosana (Matsumura, 1925)
- Polygonia c-album asakurai Nakahara, 1920
- Polygonia c-aureum lunulata Esaki & Nakahara, 1923 comma
- Symbrenthia hypselis scatinia Fruhstorfer, 1908
- Symbrenthia lilaea formosanus Fruhstorfer, 1908 common jester
- Vanessa cardui (Linnaeus, 1758) painted lady
- Vanessa indica (Herbst, 1794) Indian red admiral
- Yoma sabina podium Tsukada, 1985 Australian lurcher

=== Subfamily Satyrinae ===
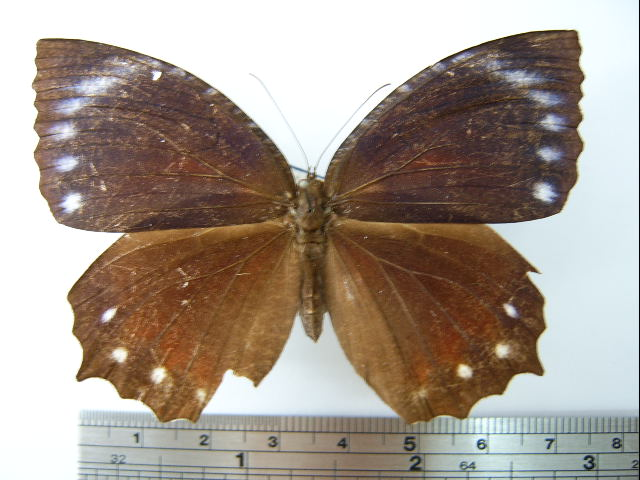
E. h. hainana female

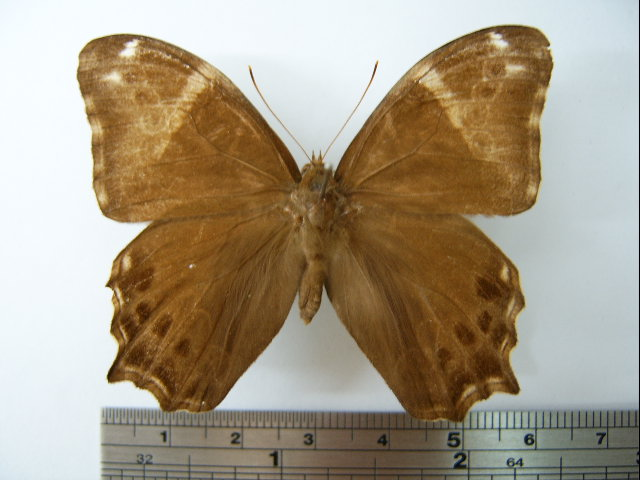
L. e. pavida male

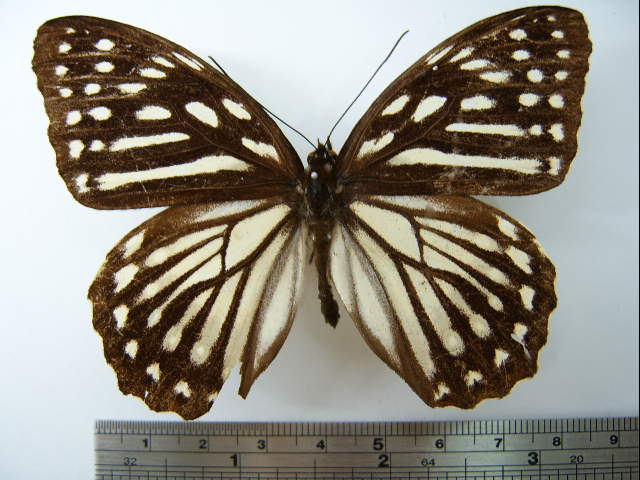
Penthema formosanum

- Elymnias hypermnestra hainana Moore, 1878 common palmfly
- Lethe bojonia Fruhstorfer, 1913
- Lethe butleri periscelis Fruhstorfer, 1908
- Lethe chandica ratnacri Fruhstorfer, 1908
- Lethe christophi hanako Fruhstorfer, 1908
- Lethe diana australis Naritomi, 1943
- Lethe europa pavida Fruhstorfer, 1908 bamboo treebrown
- Lethe gemina zaitha Fruhstorfer, 1914
- Lethe insana formosana Fruhstorfer, 1908
- Lethe mataja Fruhstorfer, 1908 ※endemic
- Lethe rohria daemoniaca Fruhstorfer, 1908 common tree brown
- Lethe verma cintamani Fruhstorfer, 1848 straight-banded treebrown
- Melanitis leda (Linnaeus, 1758) common evening brown
- Melanitis phedima polishana Fruhstorfer, 1908 dark evening brown
- Minois nagasawae (Matsumura, 1906) ※endemic
- Mycalesis francisca formosana Fruhstorfer, 1908
- Mycalesis gotama nanda Fruhstorfer, 1908
- Mycalesis mineus (Linnaeus, 1758) dark-banded bushbrown
- Mycalesis perseus blasius (Fabricius, 1798) dingy bushbrown
- Mycalesis sangaica mara Fruhstorfer, 1908 single ring bushbrown
- Mycalesis suaveolens kagina Fruhstorfer, 1908
- Mycalesis zonata Matsumura, 1909 South China bushbrown
- Neope armandii lacticolora (Fruhstorfer, 1908)
- Neope bremeri taiwana Matsumura, 1919
- Neope muirheadi nagasawae Matsumura, 1919 Muirhead's labyrinth
- Neope pulaha didia Fruhstorfer, 1909
- Palaeonympha opalina macrophthalmia Fruhstorfer, 1911
- Penthema formosanum (Rothschild, 1898)
- Ypthima akragas Fruhstorfer, 1911 ※endemic
- Ypthima angustipennis Takahashi, 2000 ※endemic
- Ypthima baldus zodina (Fruhstorfer, 1911) common five-ring
- Ypthima conjuncta yamanakai Sonan, 1938
- Ypthima esakii Shirozu, 1960 ※endemic
- Ypthima formosana Fruhstorfer, 1908 ※endemic
- Ypthima motschulskyi (Bremer & Grey, 1853) large three-ring
- Ypthima multistriata Butler, 1883
- Ypthima norma posticalis Matsumura, 1909 small three-ring ※extinct
- Ypthima okurai (Okano, 1962)
- Ypthima praenubilia common four-ring
  - Y. p. kanonis Matsumura, 1929
  - Y. p. neobilia Murayama, 1980
- Ypthima tappana Matsumura, 1909
- Ypthima wangi Lee, 1998 ※endemic
- Zophoessa dura neoclides (Fruhstorfer, 1909)
- Zophoessa niitakana (Matsumura, 1906) ※endemic
- Zophoessa siderea kanoi (Esaki & Nomura, 1937)

== See also ==
List of moths of Taiwan
