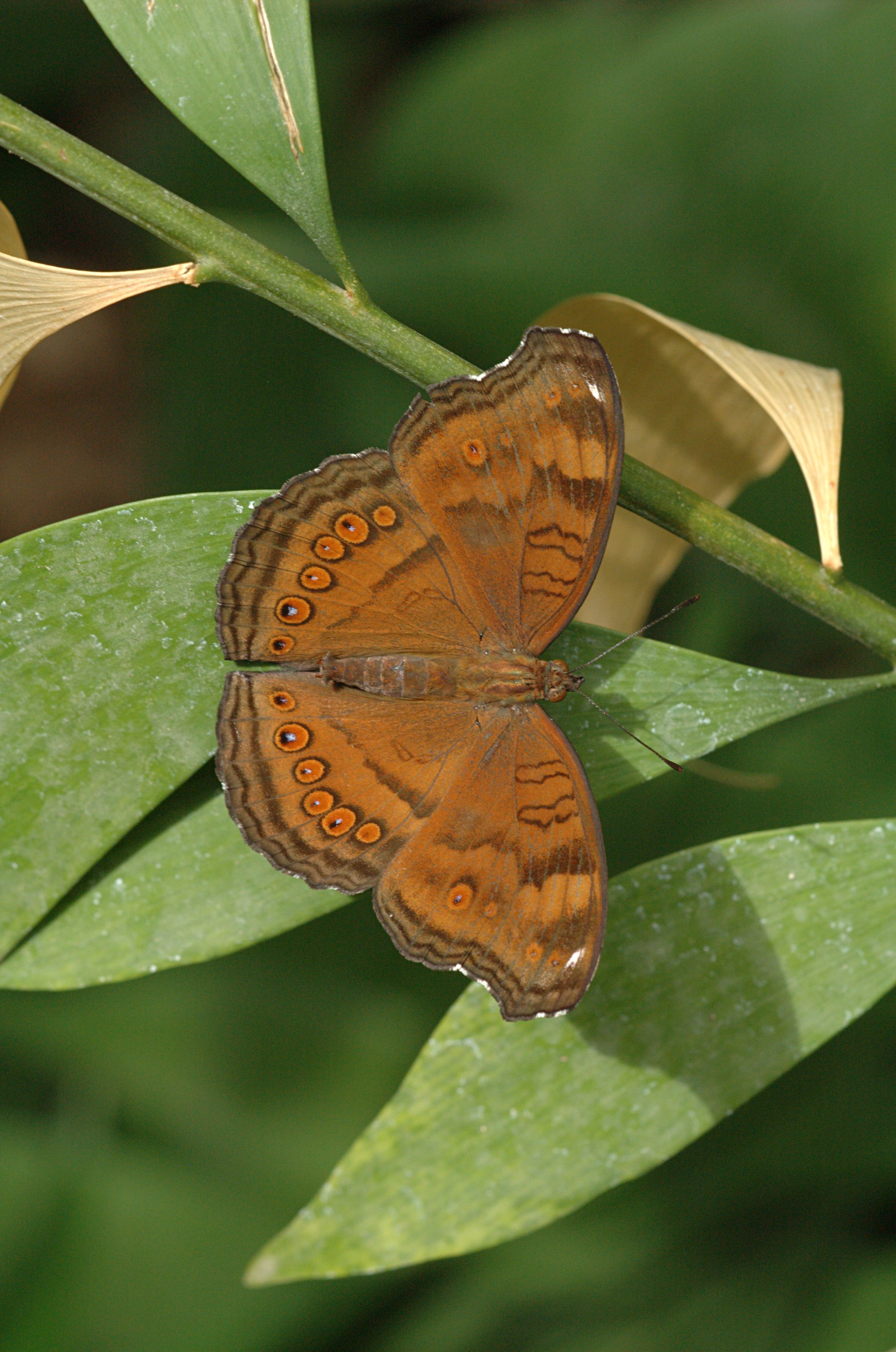

Scientific classification
- Kingdom: Animalia
- Phylum: Arthropoda
- Clade: Pancrustacea
- Class: Insecta
- Order: Lepidoptera
- Family: Nymphalidae
- Genus: Junonia
- Species: J. hedonia

Binomial name
- Junonia hedonia (Linnaeus, 1764)

Synonyms
- Papilio hedonic; Precis tradiga; Precis hedonia

= Junonia hedonia =

Brown pansy

Species of butterfly

Junonia hedonia, the brown pansy, chocolate pansy, brown soldier or chocolate argus, is a butterfly found in Southeast Asia, Indonesia, and Australia.

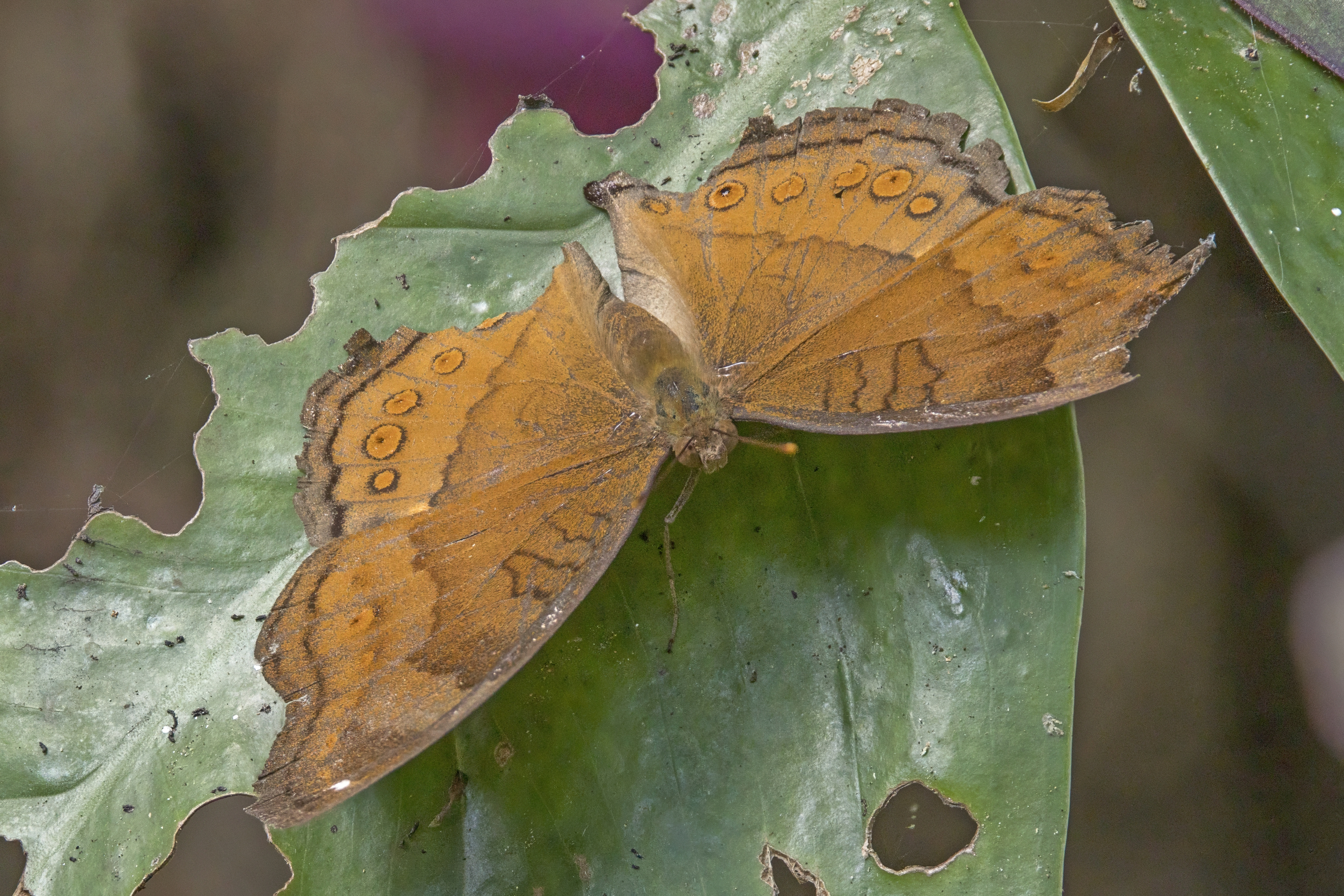
J. h. ida
Luzon, the Philippines

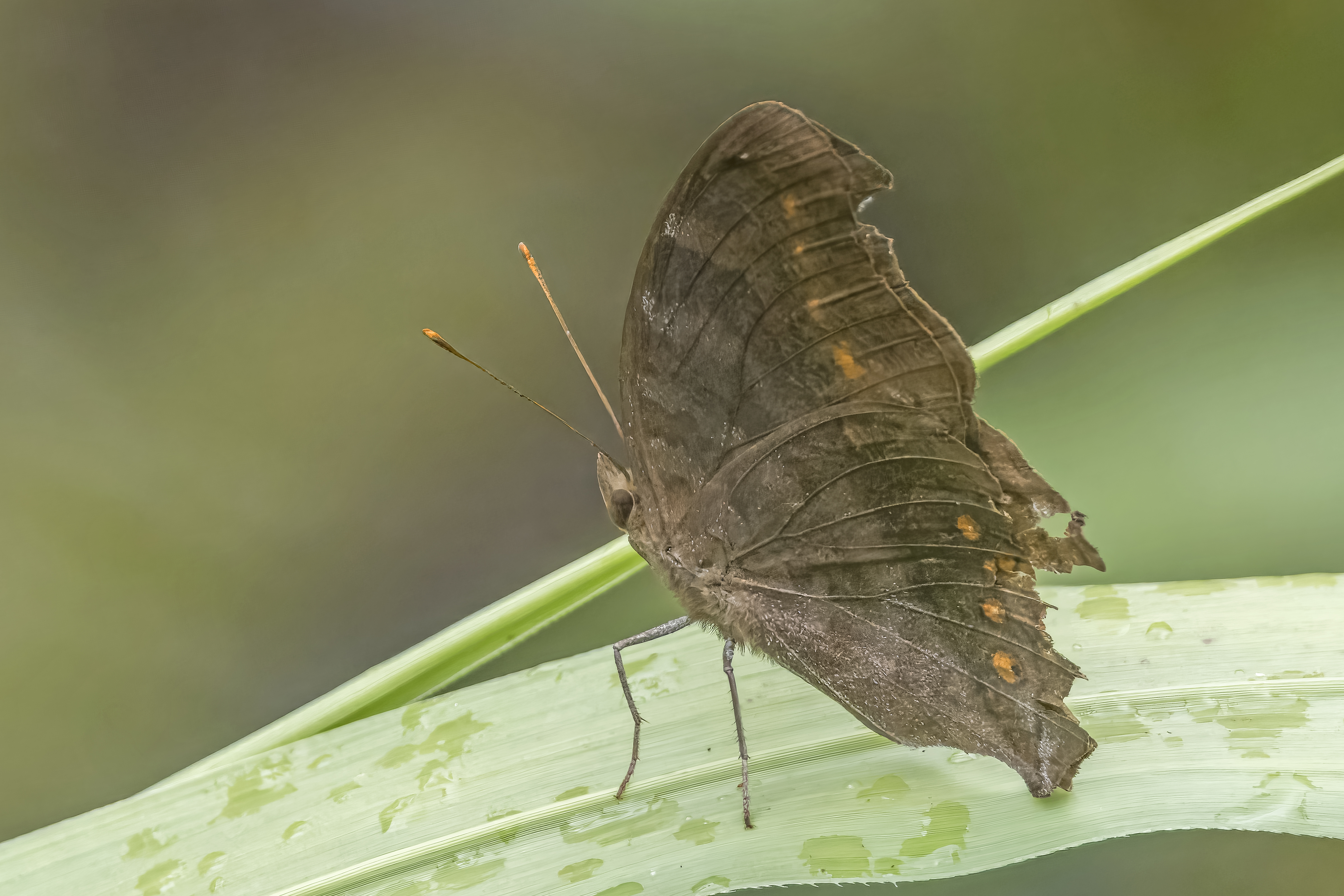
J. h. zelima
Palau

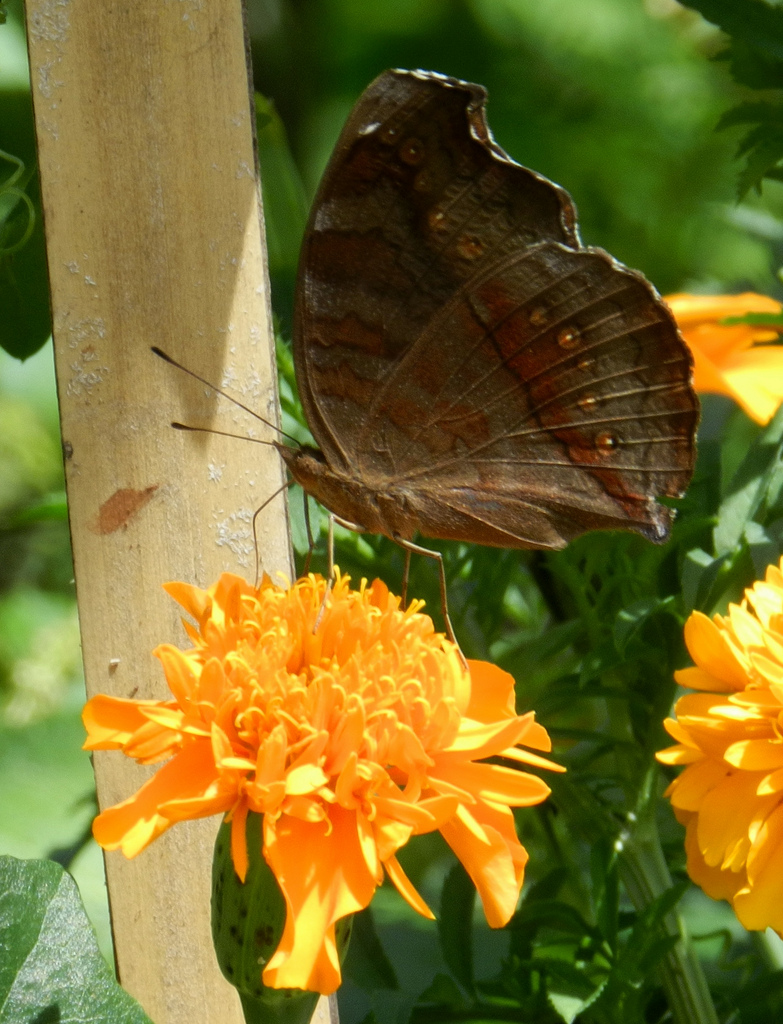

== See also ==
- List of butterflies in Taiwan
