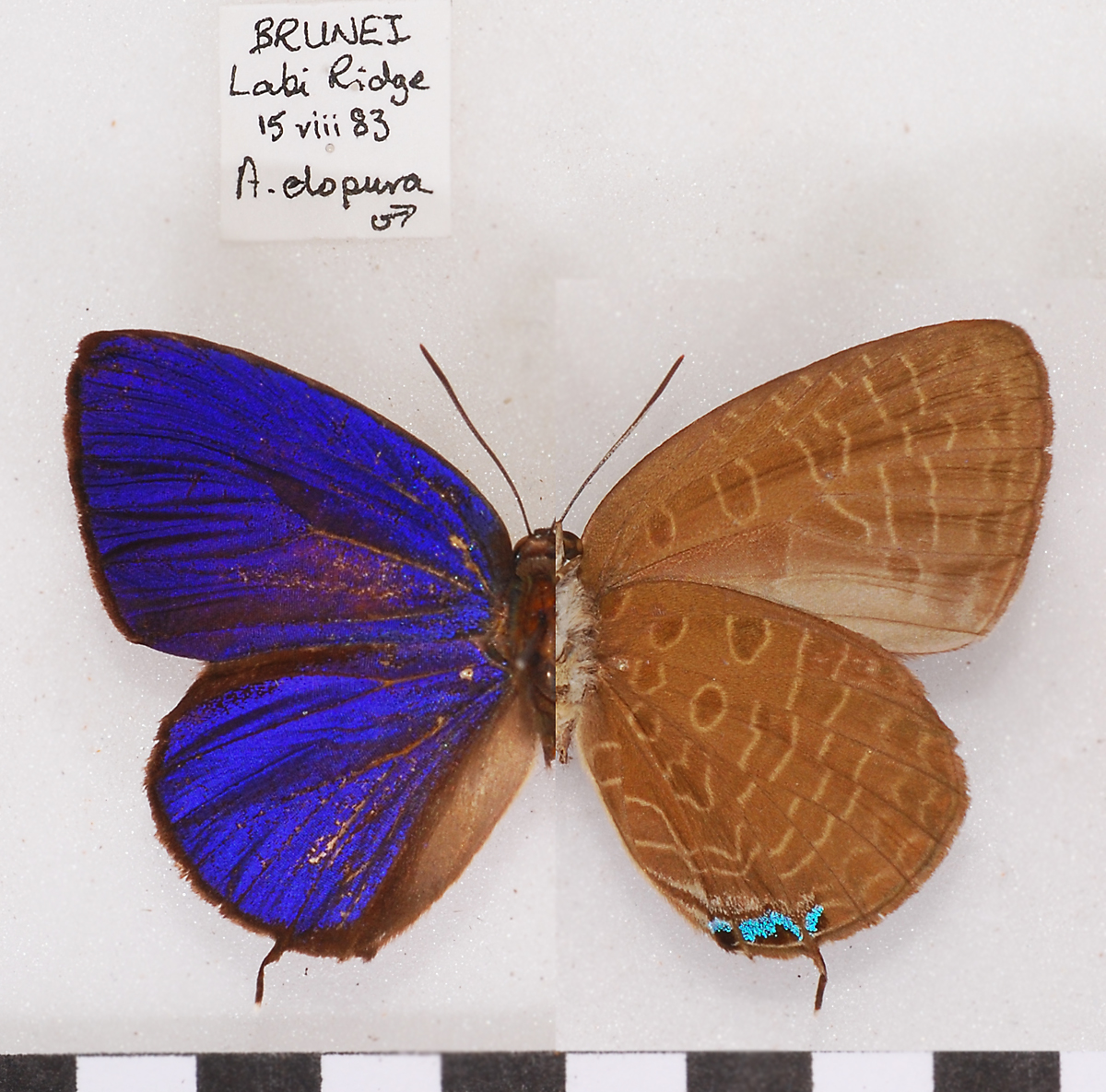
- From the Cassidy collection
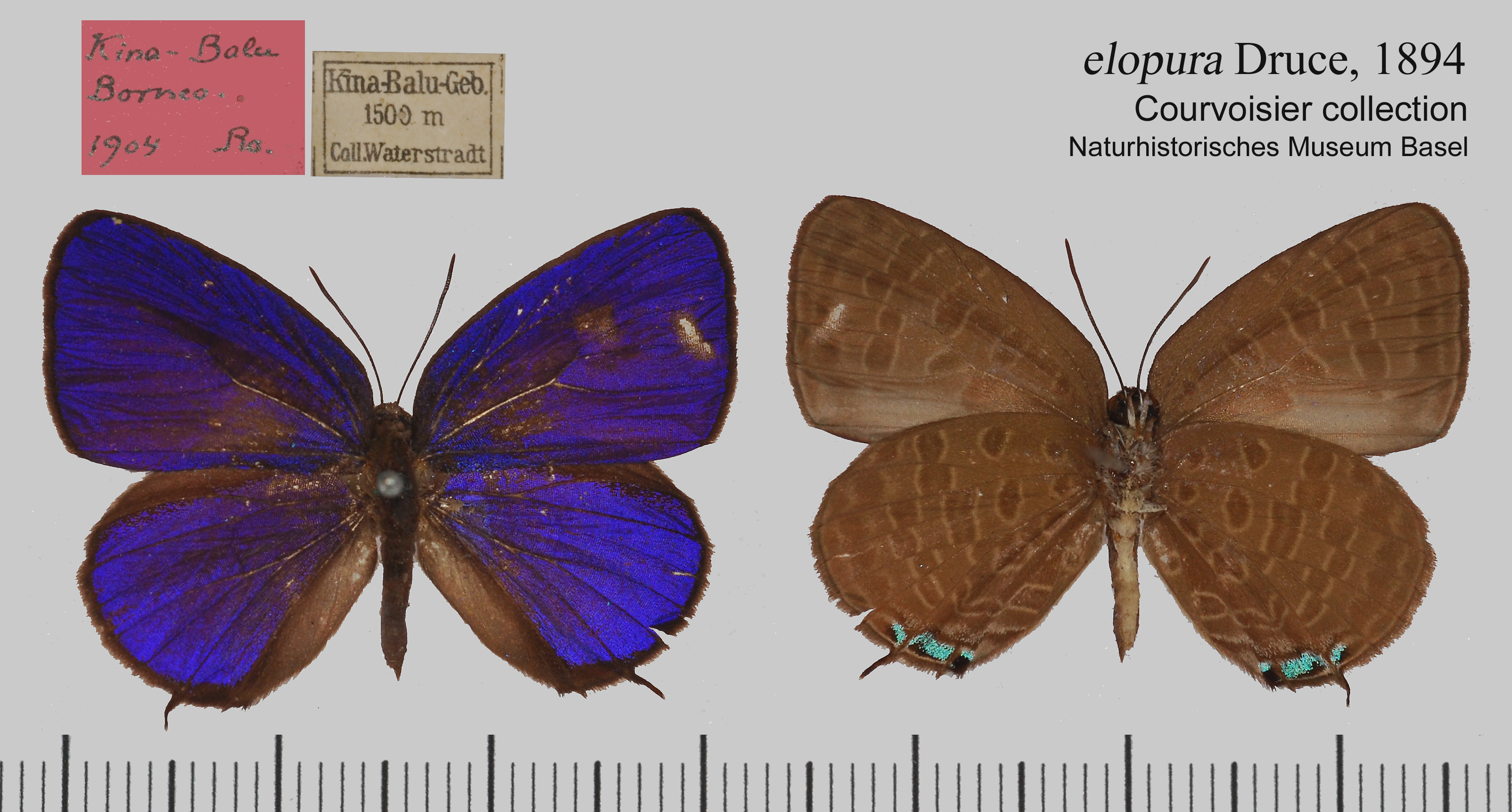
- From the Courvoisier Collection, Basel

Scientific classification
- Kingdom: Animalia
- Phylum: Arthropoda
- Clade: Pancrustacea
- Class: Insecta
- Order: Lepidoptera
- Family: Lycaenidae
- Genus: Arhopala
- Species: A. elopura

Binomial name
- Arhopala elopura H. H. Druce, 1894

Synonyms
- Arhopala dama Swinhoe, [1911]

= Arhopala elopura =

Species of butterfly

Arhopala elopura, is a species of butterfly belonging to the lycaenid family described by Hamilton Herbert Druce in 1894. It is found in Southeast Asia (Borneo, Sumatra, Peninsular Malaya, Langkawi, Mergui, Myanmar, Thailand and Indochina).

== Description ==
Under surface light earth-brown, the transverse markings only traceable as faint light comma-shaped streaks; in each of the 4 discal cells a small dark spot. Upper surface dark blue, distally more glaring, towards the base darker and of a more violet tint.

== Subspecies ==
- Arhopala elopura elopura (Borneo, Sumatra, Peninsular Malaysia)
- Arhopala elopura dama Swinhoe, [1911] (Langkawi, Mergui, Myanmar, Thailand, Indochina)
