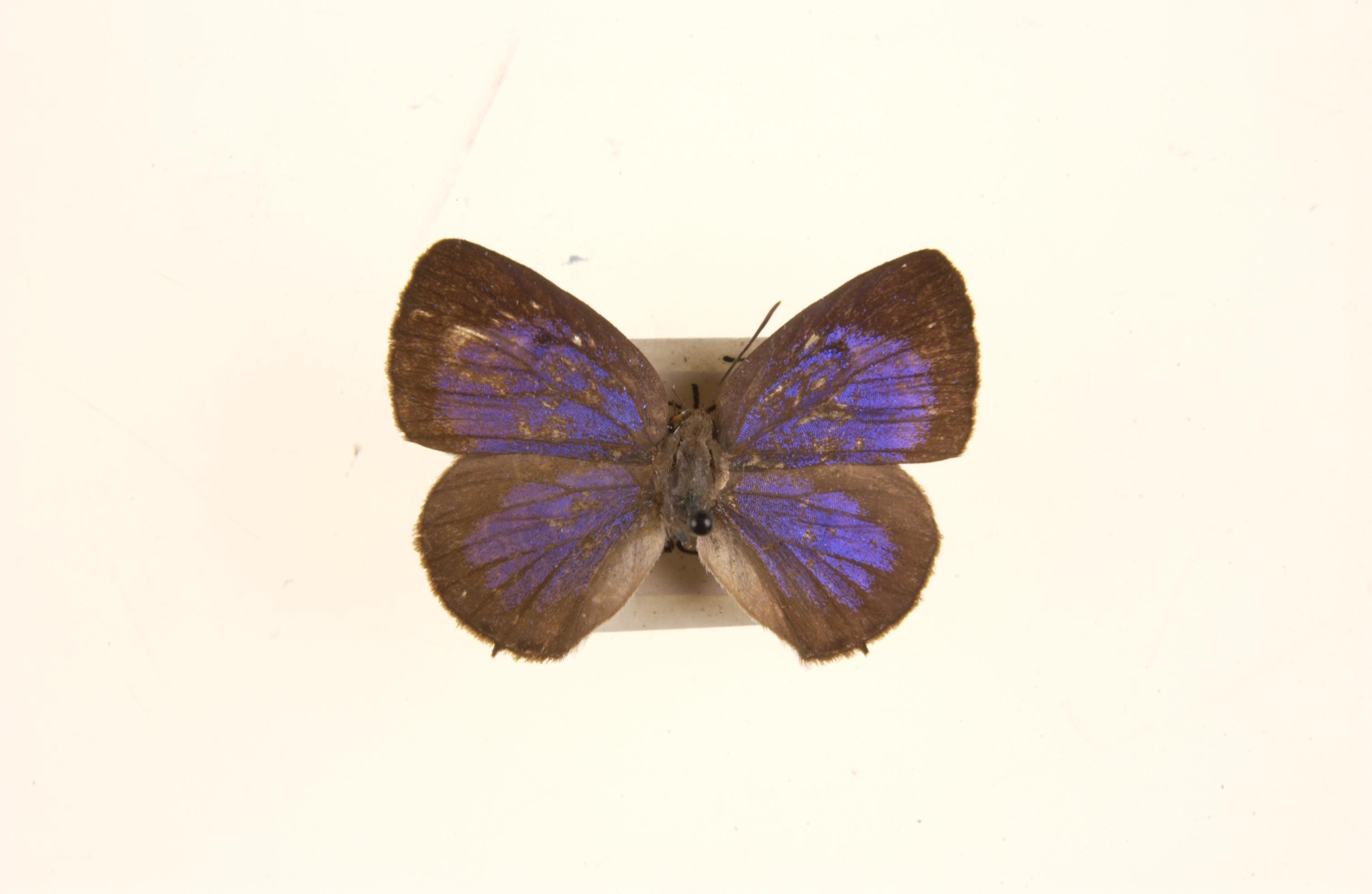
- Museum specimen from Malaya

Scientific classification
- Kingdom: Animalia
- Phylum: Arthropoda
- Clade: Pancrustacea
- Class: Insecta
- Order: Lepidoptera
- Family: Lycaenidae
- Genus: Arhopala
- Species: A. ammon

Binomial name
- Arhopala ammon (Hewitson, 1862)

Synonyms
- Amblypodia ammon Hewitson, 1862

= Arhopala ammon =

Malayan oakblue

Species of butterfly

Arhopala ammon, the Malayan oakblue, is a species of lycaenid or blue butterfly found in Southeast Asia (Assam to Burma, Langkawi, Peninsular Malaya, Singapore, Borneo).

A. ammon Hew. is a small species with fine tails; above lustrous dark blue with a black margin of 2 to 3 mm width, beneath very variegated, since cinnamon-brown bands and spots are here separated from the greyish-blue ground-colour by a distinct white bordering.
