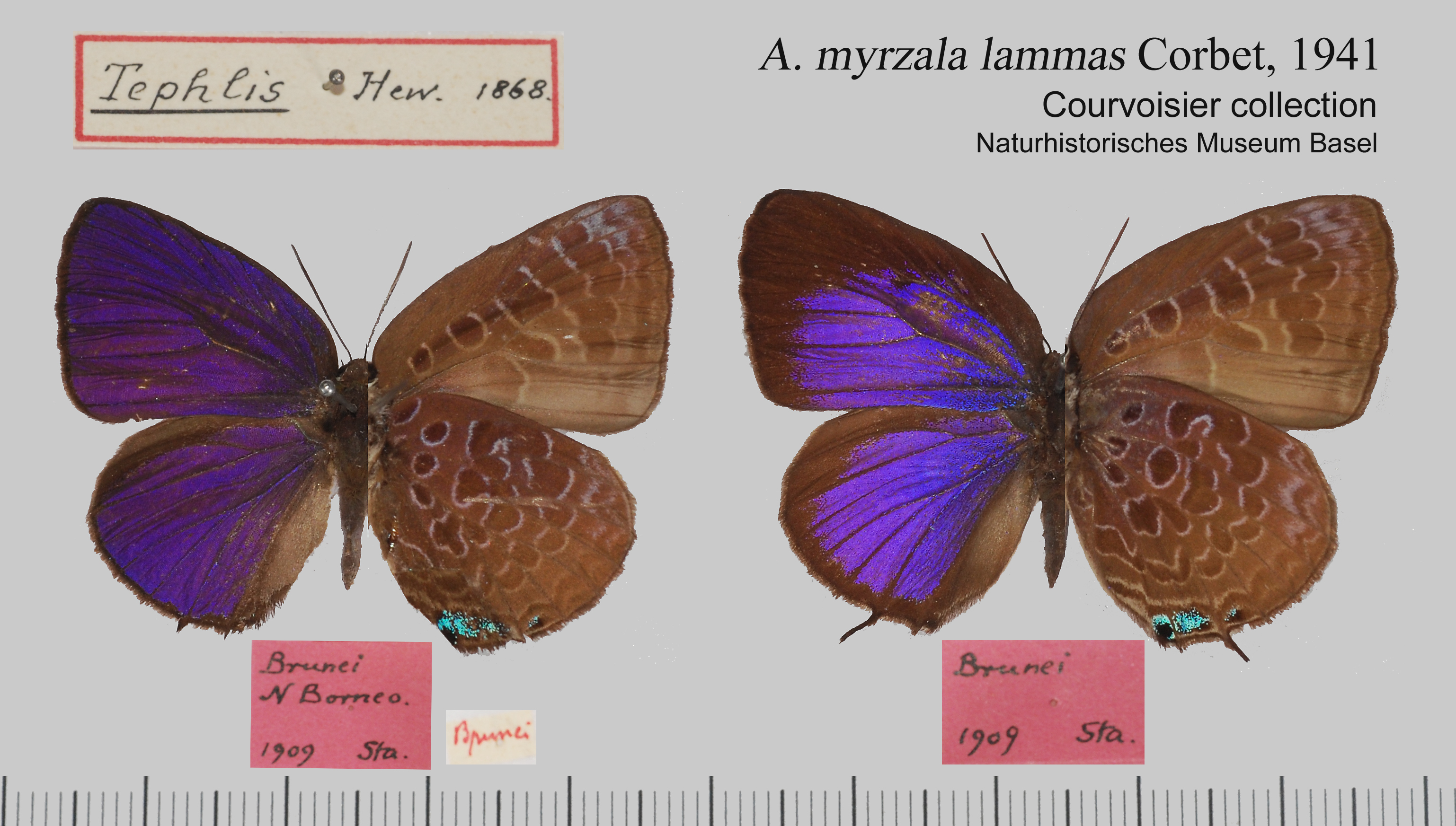
- Arhopala myrzala Courvoisier Collection, Basel

Scientific classification
- Kingdom: Animalia
- Phylum: Arthropoda
- Clade: Pancrustacea
- Class: Insecta
- Order: Lepidoptera
- Family: Lycaenidae
- Genus: Arhopala
- Species: A. myrzala

Binomial name
- Arhopala myrzala (Hewitson, 1869)

Synonyms
- Amblypodia myrzala Hewitson, 1869; Arhopala conjuncta Corbet, 1941; Arhopala lammas Corbet, 1941

= Arhopala myrzala =

Species of butterfly

Arhopala myrzala is a butterfly in the family Lycaenidae. It was described by William Chapman Hewitson in 1869. It is found in the Indomalayan realm.

A. myrzala Hew. is distinguished from all the other species by the [undersidae] distinct though fine ring-marking on the deep dark red-brown ground-colour.

== Subspecies ==
- A. m. myrzala (Philippines: Mindanao)
- A. m. conjuncta Corbet, 1941 (Langkawi)
- A. m. lammas Corbet, 1941 (Peninsular Malaysia, Singapore, Borneo)
