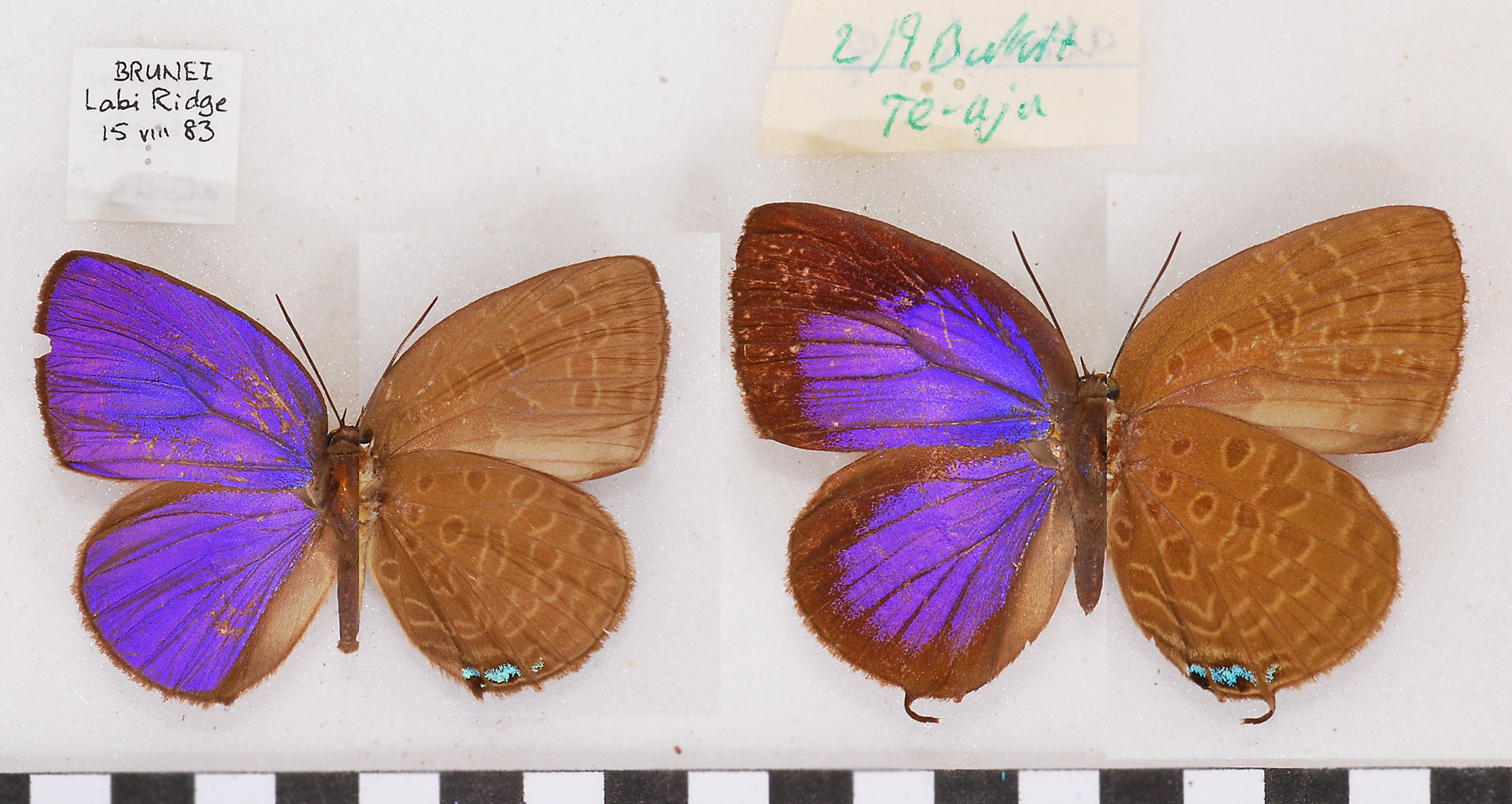

Scientific classification
- Kingdom: Animalia
- Phylum: Arthropoda
- Clade: Pancrustacea
- Class: Insecta
- Order: Lepidoptera
- Family: Lycaenidae
- Genus: Arhopala
- Species: A. atosia

Binomial name
- Arhopala atosia (Hewitson, 1869)

Synonyms
- Amblypodia atosia Hewitson, 1863; Arhopala malayana Bethune-Baker, 1903; Arhopala udapa Corbet, 1941; Amblypodia atosia aria Evans, 1932; Arhopala jahara Corbet, 1941; Amblypodia aritcia Staudinger, 1889

= Arhopala atosia =

Species of butterfly

Arhopala atosia is a species of butterfly belonging to the lycaenid family described by William Chapman Hewitson in 1869. It is found in Southeast Asia - Borneo, Sumatra, Bangka, Pulau Laut (A. a. atosia), Thailand, Indochina, Peninsular Malaya, Singapore (A. a. malayana Bethune-Baker, 1903), Burma (A. a. aria (Evans, 1932)), Langkawi, Mergui (A. a. jahara Corbet, 1941) and Palawan (A. a. aricia (Staudinger, 1889)).

Above the male is not lilac, but mostly dark blue with a very feeble violet tint, although also more intensely lilac-tinged specimens have been ascertained. Beneath very similar to pseudomuta, but in the female the postdiscal band of the hindwing is more irregular, and the 4th spot of the postmedian band of the forewing still more distally removed. The female has a black distal margin of about 3 mm width.

== Subspecies ==
- Arhopala atosia atosia (Borneo, Sumatra, Bangka, Pulau Laut)
- Arhopala atosia malayana Bethune-Baker, 1903 (Thailand, Indo-China, Peninsular Malaysia, Singapore)
- Arhopala atosia aria (Evans, 1932) (Burma)
- Arhopala atosia jahara Corbet, 1941 (Langkawi, Mergui)
- Arhopala atosia aricia (Staudinger, 1889) (Palawan)
