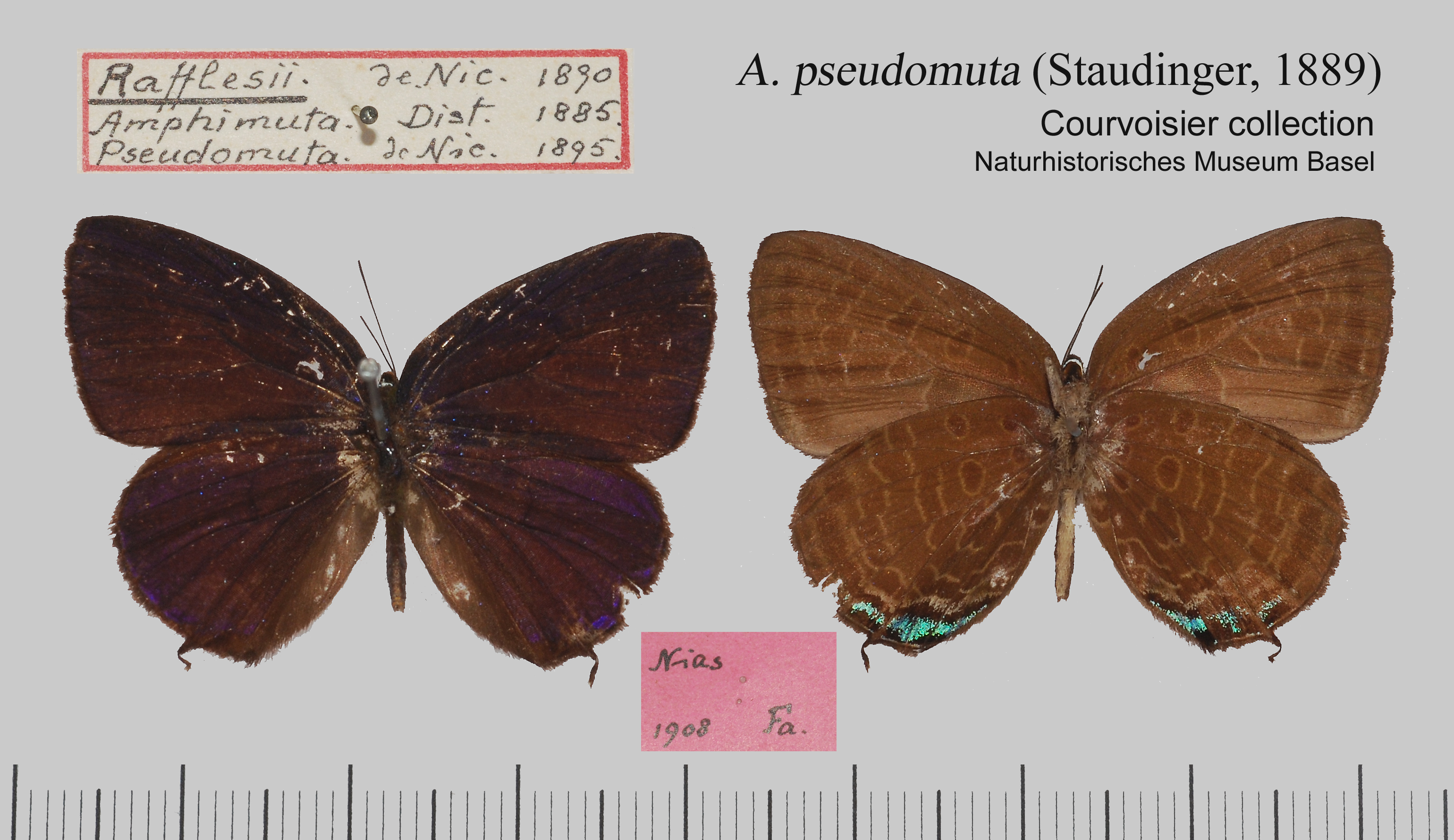
- Arhopala pseudomuta Courvoisier Collection, Basel

Scientific classification
- Kingdom: Animalia
- Phylum: Arthropoda
- Clade: Pancrustacea
- Class: Insecta
- Order: Lepidoptera
- Family: Lycaenidae
- Genus: Arhopala
- Species: A. pseudomuta

Binomial name
- Arhopala pseudomuta (Staudinger, 1889)

Synonyms
- Amblypodia pseudomuta Staudinger, 1889; Arhopala rafflesii de Nicéville, 1890; Arhopala epibata Corbet, 1948; Arhopala ariavana Corbet, 1941; Narathura mindanensis contra Evans, 1957

= Arhopala pseudomuta =

Raffles's oakblue

Species of butterfly

Arhopala pseudomuta, Raffles's oakblue, is a species of butterfly belonging to the lycaenid family. It was described by Otto Staudinger in 1889. It is found in Southeast Asia - Peninsular Malaya, Singapore (A. p.)pseudomuta), Langkawi, Mergui, Burma, Thailand (A. p. ariavana Corbet, 1941), Sumatra, Borneo (A. p. contra (Evans, 1957))

== Description ==
A. pseudomuta is much larger than elopura, the male violettish-blue, almost-lilac, the under surface regularly marked, as is to be seen from the figure; Malacca, Borneo. A. rafflesii Nic. [synonym] above dark blue instead of violet, with a slight difference of the postmedian band on the hindwing beneath, where the 4th spot is slightly removed towards the margin.

== Subspecies ==
- Arhopala pseudomuta pseudomuta (Peninsular Malaysia, Singapore)
- Arhopala pseudomuta ariavana Corbet, 1941 (Langkawi, Mergui, Burma, Thailand)
- Arhopala pseudomuta contra (Evans, 1957) (Sumatra, Borneo)

== Etymology ==
The English name honours Stamford Raffles.
