= List of butterflies of Sri Lanka =

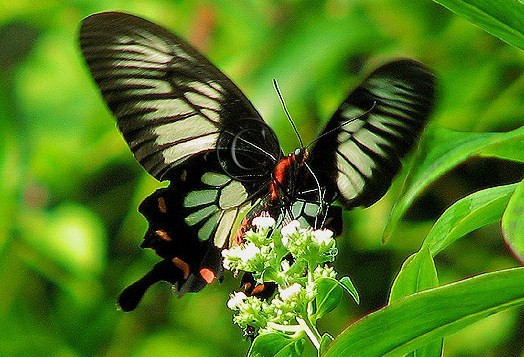
Ceylon rose is a globally threatened butterfly endemic to Sri Lanka.

Sri Lanka is home to 245 species of butterflies with 23 of these being endemic to the island. Of the 245 species, 76, are listed as threatened nationally, while the Ceylon rose is designated as critically endangered.

== General description ==
The majority of species are found in the foothills (up to 3,000 feet (910 m) elevation). A much smaller number of species are found above 4,000 feet (1,200 m), while 20 species of butterfly are restricted to the low lying dry zone (below 500 feet (150 m) elevation). The number of butterflies peaks in two seasons during the year. The first of these is during the southwestern monsoon in the months of March to April. The second is during the northeastern monsoon which continues from September to October.

Feature	Butterflies	Moths
Shape and structure of antennae	thin slender filamentous antennae which are club-shaped at the end	comb-like or feathery antennae, or filamentous and unclubbed
Wing-coupling mechanisms	lack a frenulum	have a frenulum which is a filament arising from the hindwing and coupling (matching up) with barbs on the forewing. The frenulum can be observed only when a specimen is in hand. Some moths have a lobe on the forewing called a jugum that helps in coupling with the hindwing.
Pupae	form an exposed pupa, also termed a chrysalis	moth caterpillars spin a cocoon made of silk within which they metamorphose into the pupal stage.
Colouration of the wings	bright colours on their wings	usually plain brown, grey, white or black and often with obscuring patterns of zigzags or swirls
Activity	diurnal	nocturnal and crepuscular
Structure of the body	have slender and smoother abdomens	have stout and hairy or furry-looking bodies
Scales	possess fine scales	larger scales on their wings which makes them look more dense and fluffy
Appearance of eyes	apposition eyes	superposition eyes
Resting posture	fold their wings above their backs when they are perched	rest with their wings spread out to their sides

Within Sri Lanka, the latest revision of lepidopterans described 1903 species with 58 families of butterflies and moths. Out of these 1903 species, 208 species are butterflies and 1695 species are moths.

The family-wise number of butterfly species are:

Family	Species
Papilionidae	15
Pieridae	27
Nymphalidae	69
Lycaenidae	86
Hesperiidae	46
Riodinidae	1

== History of studies on butterflies ==
The first studies of Ceylon butterflies were published by James Emerson Tennent in Ceylon, Physical, Historical and Topographical based on work by Robert Templeton and Edgar Leopold Layard active in the 1840s. In these early years William de Alwis made watercolour illustrations of life histories. Later in the century this was followed by The Lepidoptera of Ceylon by Frederic Moore which was published in 1880. Pioneering studies based on field observations were published by Walter Ormiston, a tea planter from Kalupahani, Haldumille, in 1924, Lionel Gilbert Ollyet Woodhouse and George Morrison Reid Henry in 1942 and by Woodhouse again in 1950. Bernard d'Abrera published The Butterflies of Ceylon in 1998 based on examination of specimens in the Natural History Museum in London. Recently, papers have been published on status of particular butterfly families, check-lists of various localities, life-cycles and natural history as well as butterfly migration.

== New species ==
In 2008, Dr. Michael van der Poorten discovered a new species of Sri Lankan butterfly, the first such discovery in 60 years. The species has been identified as Catopsilia scylla.

== Conservation ==
Habitat destruction and degradation, air pollution, over-usage of pesticides, and over-exploitation for ornamental trade are the main threats to butterflies in Sri Lanka. Prolonged droughts and over-predation also pose a threat to them. Opportunistic predators such as ants and birds prey on butterfly eggs, caterpillars, pupae and adults. The Ceylon rose and Ceylon birdwing are presently included in the appendices of the Convention on International Trade in Endangered Species of Wild Fauna and Flora (CITES). This United Nations initiative aims to protect these species against over-exploitation by restricting trade across borders.

== Endemic species ==
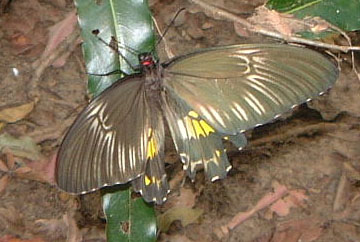
The Ceylon birdwing is the largest butterfly endemic to Sri Lanka.

A majority of endemic species are restricted to the wet zone forests. The Ceylon birdwing is one of the largest endemics of the country and is found in large numbers in the Sinharaja Forest Reserve.

Common name	Binomial name
Ceylon tree-nymph	Idea iasonia
Ceylon tiger	Parantica taprobana
Ceylon palmfly	Elymnias singhala
Ceylon treebrown	Lethe daretis
Ceylon forester	Lethe dynsate
Cingalese bushbrown	Mycalesis rama
Sinhalese five-ring	Ypthima singala
Blue oak leaf	Kallima philarchus
Ormiston's oakblue	Arhopala ormistoni
Ceylon cerulean	Jamides coruscans
Milky cerulean	Jamides lacteata
Woodhouse's four lineblue	Nacaduba ollyetti
Pale Ceylon six lineblue	Nacaduba sinhala
Green's silverline	Cigaritis greeni
Clouded silverline	Cigaritis nubilus
Ceylon indigo royal	Tajuria arida
Ceylon hedge blue	Udara lanka
Lesser albatross	Appias galene
One spot grass yellow	Eurema ormistoni
Ceylon rose	Pachliopta jophon
Common birdwing	Troides darsius
Black flat	Celaenorrhinus spilothyrus
Decorated ace	Halpe decorata

== Papilionidae ==
Name	Binomial	Subspecies	Status
Tailed jay	Graphium agamemnon	Graphium agamemnon menides	Least concern
Common bluebottle	Graphium sarpedon	Graphium sarpedon menides Graphium sarpedon teredon	Least concern
Common jay	Graphium doson	Graphium doson doson	Least concern
Spot swordtail	Graphium nomius	Graphium nomius nomius	Least concern
Fivebar swordtail	Graphium antiphates	Graphium antiphates ceylonicus	Least concern
Great Mormon	Papilio agenor	Papilio agenor parinda	Least concern
Common banded peacock	Papilio crino		Least concern
Large-spotted Helen	Papilio daksha	Papilio daksha mooreanus	Least concern
Common Mormon	Papilio polytes	Papilio polytes romulus	Least concern
Lime butterfly	Papilio demoleus	Papilio demoleus demoleus	Least concern
Common mime	Papilio clytia	Papilio clytia lankeswara	Least concern
Common rose	Pachliopta aristolochiae	Pachliopta aristolochiae ceylanica	Least concern
Crimson rose	Pachliopta hector		Least concern
Ceylon rose	Pachliopta jophon	Endemic	Critically endangered
Sri Lankan birdwing	Troides darsius	Endemic	Near threatened

== Hesperiidae ==
Name	Binomial	Subspecies	Status
Branded-orange awlet	Bibasis oedipodea	Bibasis oedipodea ataphus	
Orange-tailed awl	Bibasis sena	Bibasis sena sena	
Common banded awl	Hasora chromus	Hasora chromus chromus	
White-banded awl	Hasora taminatus	Hasora taminatus taminatus	
Ceylon awl	Hasora badra	Hasora badra lanka	
Brown awl	Badamia exclamationis		
Indian awl king	Choaspes benjaminii	Choaspes benjaminii benjaminii	
Black flat	Celaenorrhinus spilothyrus		
Black angle	Tapena thwaitesi	Tapena thwaitesi thwaitesi	
Tricolor pied flat	Coladenia indrani	Coladenia indrani tissa	
Common small flat	Sarangesa dasahara	Sarangesa dasahara albicilia	
Ceylon snow flat	Tagiades japetus	Tagiades japetus obscurus	
Water snow flat	Tagiades litigiosa	Tagiades litigiosa ceylonica	
Golden angle	Caprona ransonnetii	Caprona ransonnetii ransonnetii	
Ceylon golden angle	Caprona alida	Caprona alida lanka	
African marbled skipper	Gomalia elma	Gomalia elma albofasciata	
Indian skipper	Spialia galba		
Hedge hopper	Baracus vittatus	Baracus vittatus vittatus	
Bush hopper	Ampittia dioscorides	Ampittia dioscorides singa	
Ceylon ace	Halpe homolea	• Halpe homolea ceylonica • Halpe homolea egena	
Decorated ace	Thoressa decorata		
Chestnut bob	Iambrix salsala	Iambrix salsala luteipalpus	
Common banded demon	Notocrypta paralysos	Notocrypta paralysos alysia	
Restricted demon	Notocrypta curvifascia	Notocrypta curvifascia curvifascia	
Grass demon	Udaspes folus		
Indian palm bob	Suastus gremius	Suastus gremius subgrisea	
Ceylon palm bob	Suastus minuta	Suastus minuta minuta	
Tree flitter	Hyarotis adrastus	Hyarotis adrastus adrastus	
Banded redeye	Gangara lebadea	Gangara lebadea subfasciata	
Giant redeye	Gangara thyrsis	Gangara thyrsis clothilda	
Common redeye	Matapa aria		
Common grass dart	Taractrocera maevius	Taractrocera maevius maevius	
Common dartlet	Oriens goloides		
Indian dart	Potanthus pallida		
Common dart	Potanthus pseudomaesa	Potanthus pseudomaesa pseudomaesa	
Tropic dart	Potanthus confucius	Potanthus Confucius satra	
Pale palmdart	Telicota colon	Telicota colon amba	
Dark palmdart	Telicota ancilla	Telicota ancilla lanka	
Yellow palm dart	Cephrenes trichopepla		
Ceylon swift	Parnara bada		
Wallace's swift	Borbo cinnara		
Little branded swift	Pelopidas agna	Pelopidas agna agna	
Large branded swift	Pelopidas thrax	Pelopidas thrax subochracea	
Small branded swift	Pelopidas mathias	Pelopidas mathias mathias	
Conjoined swift	Pelopidas conjuncta	Pelopidas conjuncta narooa	
Paintbrush swift	Baoris penicillata		
Blank swift	Caltoris kumara	Caltoris kumara lanka	
Philippine swift	Caltoris philippina	Caltoris philippina philippina	

== Pieridae ==
Name	Binomial	Subspecies	Status
Common gull	Cepora nerissa	Cepora nerissa evagete	Least concern
Lesser gull	Cepora nadina	Cepora nadina cingala	Least concern
Common Jezebel	Delias eucharis		Least concern
Painted sawtooth	Prioneris sita		Least concern
Common albatross	Appias albina	Appias albina venusta	Least concern
Sri Lankan Lesser Albatross	Appias galene		Endemic
Plain puffin	Appias indra	Appias indra narendra	Least concern
Western striped albatross	Appias libythea	Appias libythea libythea	Least concern
Chocolate albatross	Appias lyncida	Appias lyncida taprobana	Least concern
Ceylon lesser albatross	Appias paulina	Appias paulina galene	Least concern
Psyche	Leptosia nina	Leptosia nina nina	Least concern
White orange tip	Ixias marianne		Least concern
Yellow orange tip	Ixias pyrene	Ixias pyrene cingalensis	Least concern
Great orange-tip	Hebomoia glaucippe	Hebomoia glaucippe ceylonica	Least concern
Small salmon Arab	Colotis amata	Colotis amata modesta	Least concern
Large salmon Arab	Colotis fausta	Colotis fausta fulva	Least concern
Small orange-tip	Colotis etrida	Colotis etrida limbatus	Least concern
Crimson-tip	Colotis danae	Colotis danae danae	Least concern
Plain orange-tip	Colotis aurora		Least concern
Dark wanderer	Pareronia ceylanica	Pareronia ceylanica ceylanica	Least concern
Lemon emigrant	Catopsilia pomona	Pachliopta aristolochiae ceylanica	Least concern
Mottled emigrant	Catopsilia pyranthe	Catopsilia pyranthe minna	Least concern
Orange emigrant	Catopsilia scylla		Least concern
Small grass yellow	Eurema drona	Eurema drona rubella	Least concern
Spotless grass yellow	Eurema laeta	Eurema laeta laeta	Least concern
Common grass yellow	Eurema hecabe	Eurema hecabe simulata	Least concern
Three-spot grass yellow	Eurema blanda	Eurema blanda silhetana	Least concern
Sri Lanka one-spot grass yellow	Eurema ormistoni		Endemic

== Riodinidae ==
Name	Binomial	Subspecies	Status
Plum Judy	Abisara echerius	Abisara echerius prunosa	Least concern

== Lycaenidae ==
Name	Binomial	Subspecies	Status
Hampson's hedge blue	Acytolepis lilacea	Acytolepis lilacea moorei	
Common hedge blue	Acytolepis puspa	Acytolepis puspa felderi	
Pointed ciliate blue	Anthene lycaenina	Anthene lycaenina lycaenina	
Bright babul blue	Azanus ubaldus		
African babul blue	Azanus jesous	Azanus jesous gamra	
Angled Pierrot	Caleta caleta		
Common Pierrot	Castalius rosimon		
Forget-me-not	Catochrysops strabo		
Silver forget-me-not	Catochrysops panormus	Catochrysops panormus panormus	
Plain hedge blue	Celastrina lavendularis	Celastrina lavendularis lavendularis	
Lime blue	Chilades lajus	Chilades lajus lajus	
Small Cupid	Chilades parrhasius	Chilades parrhasius nila	
Indian Cupid	Cupido lacturnus		
Banded blue Pierrot	Discolampa ethion	Discolampa ethion ethion	
Gram blue	Euchrysops cnejus	Euchrysops cnejus cnejus	
Grass jewel	Freyeria trochylus		
Pointed lineblue	Ionolyce helicon	Ionolyce helicon viola	
Dark cerulean	Jamides bochus	Jamides bochus bochus	
Ceylon cerulean	Jamides coruscans		Endemic
Common cerulean	Jamides celeno	Jamides celeno tissama	
Metallic cerulean	Jamides alecto	Jamides alecto meilichius	
Pea blue	Lampides boeticus		
Milky cerulean	Lampides lacteata		
Plains Cupid	Luthrodes pandava	Luthrodes pandava lanka	
Malayan	Megisba malaya	Megisba Malaya thwaitesi	
Large four lineblue	Nacaduba pactolus	Nacaduba pactolus ceylonica	
Pale four lineblue	Nacaduba hermus	Nacaduba hermus sidoma	
Woodhouse's four lineblue	Nacaduba ollyetti		Endemic
Transparent six lineblue	Nacaduba kurava	Nacaduba kurava prominens	
Opaque six lineblue	Nacaduba beroe	Nacaduba beroe minima	
Dark Ceylon lineblue	Nacaduba calauria	Nacaduba calauria toxopeusi	
Pale Ceylon lineblue	Nacaduba sinhala		Endemic
Rounded lineblue	Nacaduba berenice	Nacaduba Berenice ormistoni	
Quaker	Neopithecops zalmora		
Dingy lineblue	Petrelaea dana		
Common lineblue	Prosotas nora	Prosotas nora ardates	
Tailless lineblue	Prosotas dubiosa	Prosotas dubiosa indica	
White-tipped lineblue	Prosotas noreia		
Zebra blue	Leptotes plinius		
Red Pierrot	Talicada nyseus	Talicada nyseus nyseus	
Striped Pierrot	Tarucus nara		
Butler's spotted Pierrot	Tarucus callinara		
White hedge blue	Udara akasa	Udara akasa mavisa	
Ceylon hedge blue	Udara lanka		Endemic
Singalese hedge blue	Udara singalensis		Endemic
Dark grass blue	Zizeeria karsandra		
Lesser grass blue	Zizina otis	Zizina Otis decreta	
Indian sunbeam	Curetis thetis		
Apefly	Spalgis epeus	Spalgis epeus epeus	
Common silverline	Cigaritis vulcanus	Cigaritis vulcanus fusca	
Plumbeous silverline	Cigaritis schistacea		
Green's silverline	Cigaritis greeni		Endemic
Clouded silverline	Cigaritis nubilus		Endemic
Ceylon silverline	Cigaritis ictis	Cigaritis ictis ceylanica	
Scarce shot silverline	Cigaritis elima	Cigaritis elima fairliei	
Long-banded silverline	Cigaritis lohita	Cigaritis lohita lazularia	
Purple leaf blue	Amblypodia anita	Amblypodia anita naradoides	
Centaur oakblue	Arhopala centaurus	Arhopala centaurus pirama	
Large oakblue	Arhopala amantes	Arhopala amantes amantes	
Ormiston's oakblue	Arhopala ormistoni		
Aberrant oakblue	Arhopala abseus	Arhopala abseus mackwoodi	
Tamil oakblue	Arhopala bazaloides	Arhopala bazaloides lanka	
Plane	Bindahara phocides	Bindahara phocides moorei	
Common tinsel	Catapaecilma major	Catapaecilma major myositina	
Common imperial	Cheritra freja	Cheritra freja pseudojaffra	
Cornelian	Deudorix epijarbas	Deudorix epijarbas epijarbus	
Common onyx	Horaga onyx	Horaga onyx cingalensis	
Brown onyx	Horaga albimacula	Horaga albimacula viola	
Nilgiri tit	Hypolycaena nilgirica		
Silver streak blue	Iraota timoleon	Iraota timoleon nicevillei	
Yamfly	Loxura atymnus	Loxura atymnus arcuata	
Southern royal	Pratapa deva	Pratapa deva deva	
Monkey-puzzle	Rathinda amor		
Malabar flash	Rapala lankana		
Indigo flash	Rapala varuna	Rapala varuna lazulina	
Slate flash	Rapala manea	Rapala manea schistacea	
Indian red flash	Rapala iarbus	Rapala iarbus sorya	
Common acacia blue	Surendra vivarna	Surendra vivarna discalis	
Plains blue royal	Tajuria jehana	Tajuria jehana ceylonica	
Ceylon indigo royal	Tajuria arida		Endemic
Peacock royal	Tajuria cippus	Tajuria cippus longinus	
Common guava blue	Virachola isocrates	Virachola isocrates isocrates	
Large guava blue	Virachola perse	Virachola perse ghela	
Redspot	Zesius chrysomallus		

== Nymphalidae ==
Name	Binomial	Subspecies	Status
Glassy tiger	Parantica aglea	Parantica aglea aglea	Least concern
Ceylon tiger	Parantica taprobana		Endemic. Near threatened
Ceylon blue glassy tiger	Ideopsis similis	Ideopsis similis exprompta	Least concern
Blue tiger	Tirumala limniace	Tirumala limniace leopardus	Least concern
Dark blue tiger	Tirumala septentrionis	Tirumala septentrionis musikanos	Least concern
Common tiger	Danaus genutia	Danaus genutia genutia	Least concern
Plain tiger	Danaus chrysippus	Danaus chrysippus chrysippus	Least concern
Double-branded crow	Euploea sylvester	Euploea sylvester montana	Least concern
Great crow	Euploea phaenareta	Euploea phaenareta corus	Least concern
Blue king crow	Euploea klugii	Euploea klugii sinhala	Least concern
Common Indian crow	Euploea core	Euploea core asela	Least concern
Ceylon tree nymph	Idea iasonia		Endemic, Near threatened
Common evening brown	Melanitis leda	Melanitis leda ismene	Least concern
Dark evening brown	Melanitis phedima	Melanitis phedima tambra	Least concern
Common palmfly	Elymnias hypermnestra	Elymnias hypermnestra fraterna	Least concern
Ceylon palmfly	Elymnias singhala		Endemic. Near threatened
Ceylon treebrown	Lethe daretis		Endemic
Common treebrown	Lethe rohria	Lethe rohria yoga	Least concern
Tamil treebrown	Lethe drypetis	Lethe drypetis drypetis	Least concern
Ceylon forester	Lethe dynsate		Endemic
Common bushbrown	Mycalesis perseus	Mycalesis perseus typhlus	Least concern
Dark-brand bushbrown	Mycalesis mineus	Mycalesis mineus polydecta	Not evaluated
Long-brand bushbrown	Mycalesis visala	Mycalesis visala subdita	Not evaluated
Cingalese bushbrown	Mycalesis rama		Endemic
Glad-eye bushbrown	Mycalesis patnia	Mycalesis patina junonia	
Nigger	Orsotriaena medus	Orsotriaena medus mandata	Least concern
Jewel four-ring	Ypthima avanta		
White four-ring	Ypthima ceylonica		
Sinhalese five-ring	Ypthima singala		Endemic
Southern duffer	Discophora lepida	Discophora lepida ceylonica	Least concern
Angled castor	Ariadne ariadne	Ariadne Ariadne minorata	
Common castor	Ariadne merione	Ariadne merione taprobana	
Joker	Byblia ilithyia		Least concern
Tawny coster	Acraea terpsicore		
Indian fritillary	Argynnis hyperbius	Argynnis hyperbius taprobana	
Common leopard	Phalanta phalantha	Phalanta phalantha phalantha	
Small leopard	Phalanta alcippe	Phalanta alcippe ceylonica	
Tamil lacewing	Cethosia nietneri		
Rustic	Cupha erymanthis	Cupha erymanthis placida	
Cruiser	Vindula erota	Vindula erota asela	
Tamil yeoman	Cirrochroa thais	Cirrochroa thais lanka	
Blue admiral	Kaniska canace	Kaniska canace haronica	
Indian red admiral	Vanessa indica	Vanessa indica nubicola	
Painted lady	Vanessa cardui		
Chocolate soldier	Junonia iphita	Junonia iphita pluviatalis	
Yellow pansy	Junonia hierta		
Blue pansy	Junonia orithya	Junonia orithya patenas	
Lemon pansy	Junonia lemonias	Junonia lemonias vaisya	
Peacock pansy	Junonia almana	Junonia almana almana	
Grey pansy	Junonia atlites	Junonia atlites atlites	
Ceylon blue oakleaf	Kallima philarchus		Endemic. Near threatened
Autumn leaf	Doleschallia bisaltide	Doleschallia bisaltide ceylonica	
Great eggfly	Hypolimnas bolina		
Danaid eggfly	Hypolimnas misippus		
Common sailer	Neptis hylas	Neptis hylas varmona	
Chestnut-streaked sailer	Neptis jumbah	Neptis jumbah nalanda	
Common lascar	Pantoporia hordonia	Pantoporia hordonia sinuata	
Commander	Moduza procris	Moduza procris calidasa	
Clipper	Parthenos sylvia	Parthenos Sylvia cyaneus	
Redspot duke	Dophla evelina	Dophla evelina evelina	
Baronet	Euthalia nais		
Gaudy baron	Euthalia lubentina	Euthalia lubentina sittacus	
Common baron	Euthalia aconthea	Euthalia aconthea vasanta	
Black prince	Rohana parisatis	Rohana parisatis camiba	
Common nawab	Polyura athamas		
Tawny rajah	Charaxes psaphon	Charaxes psaphon psaphon	
Black rajah	Charaxes solon	Charaxes solon cerynthus	
Club beak	Libythea myrrha	Libythea myrrha rama	
European or common beak	Libythea celtis	Libythea celtis lepitoides	

== Bibliography ==
- Channa N. B. & Bambaradeniya E. (2006). The Fauna of Sri Lanka: Status of Taxonomy, Research, and Conservation. Colombo, The World Conservation Union (IUCN).
- D'Abrera, B. L. (1998). The Butterflies of Ceylon. Hill House: Melbourne; London. ISBN 0-947352-35-X
- Henry, G. M. R. & Woodhouse, L. G. O. (1942). The Butterfly Fauna of Ceylon. Colombo; Ceylon.
- Moore, F. C. (1880–1887). The Lepidoptera of Ceylon. L. Reeve & Co.: London. 3 v.
- Ormiston, W. (1924). The Butterflies of Ceylon. Colombo, H. W. Cave.
- Pethiyagoda, R. (1998). "The family de Alwis Seneviratne of Sri Lanka: pioneers in biological illustration". Journal of South Asian Natural History. 4: 99–110.
