= Byasa laos =

Conservation status
- Near Threatened (IUCN 3.1)

Scientific classification
- Kingdom: Animalia
- Phylum: Arthropoda
- Clade: Pancrustacea
- Class: Insecta
- Order: Lepidoptera
- Family: Papilionidae
- Genus: Byasa
- Species: B. laos

Binomial name
- Byasa laos (Riley & Godfrey, 1921)

Synonyms
- Atrophaneura laos Riley & Godfrey, 1921

Species of butterfly

Byasa laos, the Lao windmill, is a species of butterfly from the family Papilionidae. The species was first described by Norman Denbigh Riley and Edward John Godfrey in 1921.

The species is found in Laos and northern Thailand, of Southeast Asia region.

== Status ==
Said to be very rare, but status not known with any certainty. More data required for conservation assessment.

== See also ==
- List of butterflies of South Asia
- List of butterflies of Taiwan
