= Common clubtail =

Common clubtail may refer to:

- Gomphus vulgatissimus, a dragonfly found in streaming rivers and creeks in Europe
- Losaria coon, a swallowtail butterfly native to China and Indochina
