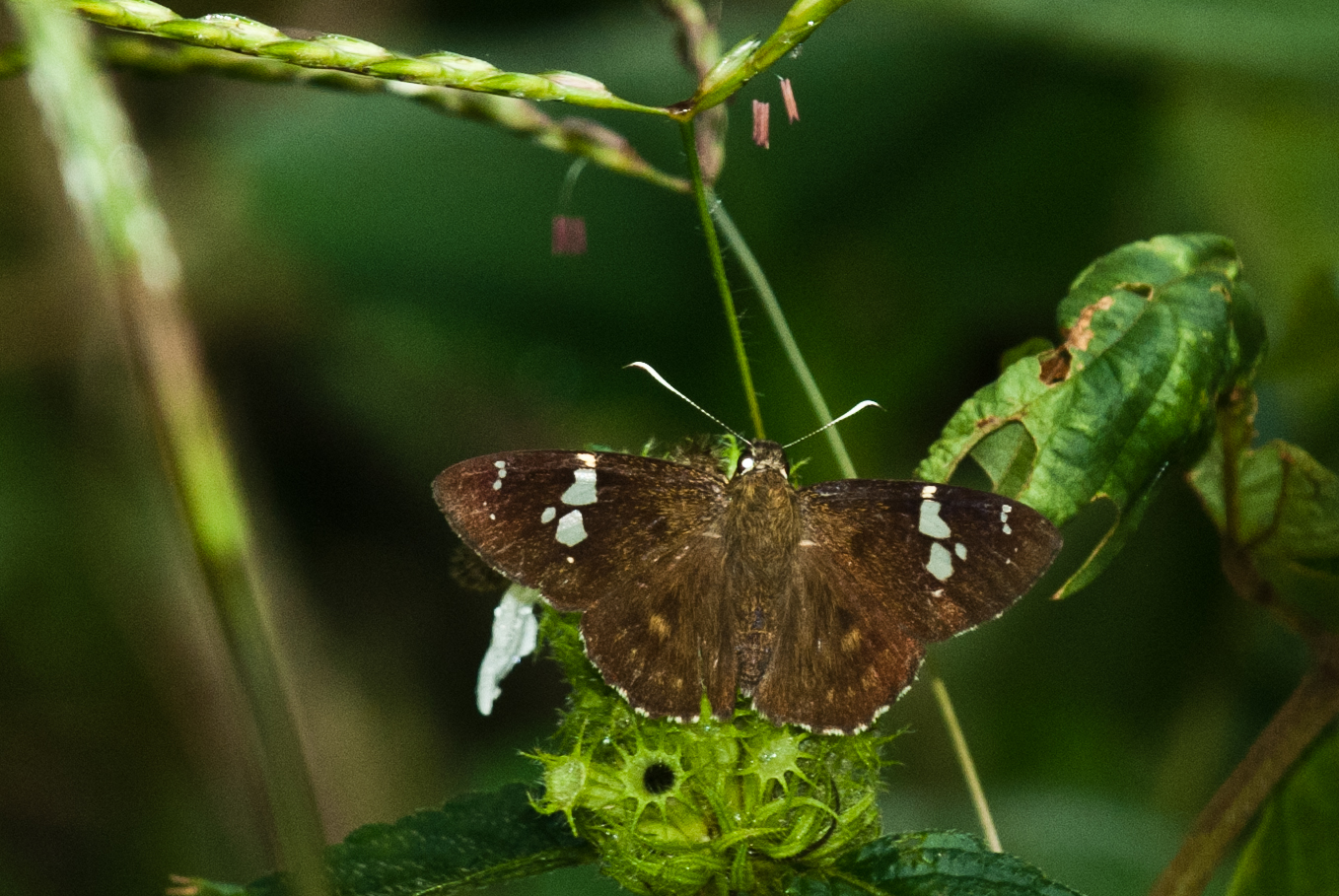

Scientific classification
- Domain: Eukaryota
- Kingdom: Animalia
- Phylum: Arthropoda
- Class: Insecta
- Order: Lepidoptera
- Family: Hesperiidae
- Genus: Celaenorrhinus
- Species: C. ruficornis

Binomial name
- Celaenorrhinus ruficornis (Mabille, 1878)

Synonyms
- Celaenorrhinus fusca (Hampson, 1889); Tagiades area Plötz, 1885

= Celaenorrhinus ruficornis =

Tamil spotted flat

Species of butterfly

Celaenorrhinus ruficornis, commonly known as the Tamil spotted flat, is a species of butterfly belonging to the family Hesperiidae which is found in India, Java, and the Sulawesi Region.

== Range ==
The subspecies, Celaenorrhinus ruficornis fusca Hampson, 1889 occurs in India in the Western Ghats, Nilgiris and the Palni hills.

A record in Calcutta may be vagrant or mistaken.

== Description ==
The butterfly has a wingspan of 45 to 50 mm. The butterflies resemble the common spotted flat except that the discal spot in 2 and the spot end cell of the forewing are separate. The upper hindwing is only obscurely marked. The antenna is chequered and has a white club.

Male. Upperside dark olive-brown, but not blackish as in Celaenorrhinus spilothyrus the brownish-ochreous setae on the basal area of the forewing and the hairs of the hindwing more ochreous. Forewing with the sub-apical spots and the spots of the discal band similarly disposed, but there is usually only one lower dot of the suli-apical series, and the lowest small spot of the discal series is almost always wanting in this sex; the uppermost spot of the discal series is always white, not ochreous as in C. spilothyrus. Hindwing without markings. Cilia of both wings alternately black and white, the alternations more pronounced on the hindwing than on the forewing, in C. spilothyrus it is entirely blackish on both wings. Underside as on the upperside, the entire surface of both wings covered with minute ochreous-grey scales. Antennpe on the underside, with all the club, except its tip, and the upper third of the shaft pure white, the remainder of the shaft with pure white dots; palpi with the inner half ochreous-grey marked with black, the outer half blackish, white at the sides and below the eyes; head, body above and below and the legs concolorous with the wings. Female like the male above and below, but the spots in the forewing are larger, the discal band consequently more continuous, the outer spot usually wedged into the junction of the two large sub-quadrate spots, there is also on the underside of the hindwing an obscure whitish dot at the end of the cell. Cilia of both wings as in the male.

— Charles Swinhoe, Lepidoptera Indica. Vol. X

== Habits ==
It is common along the Western Ghats, especially during the monsoon. It may be caught in the daytime by beating out roadside patches of Lantana camara.

== Life history ==
Food plants: Phaulopsis, Strobilanthes (Acanthaceae).

== See also ==
- Hesperiidae
- List of butterflies of India (Hesperiidae)
