= Tajuria arida =

Ceylon indigo royal

Scientific classification
- Kingdom: Animalia
- Phylum: Arthropoda
- Class: Insecta
- Order: Lepidoptera
- Family: Lycaenidae
- Genus: Tajuria
- Species: T. arida

Binomial name
- Tajuria arida Riley, 1923

Species of butterfly

Tajuria arida, the Ceylon indigo royal, is a species of lycaenid or blue butterfly. Once classified as a subspecies of Tajuria jehana, it is endemic to Sri Lanka.

Wingspan is about 24–26 mm. Sexes similar on dorsal aspects. Generally a silver colored butterfly. On the ventral side, there is a prominent broken sub marginal black line in male.
