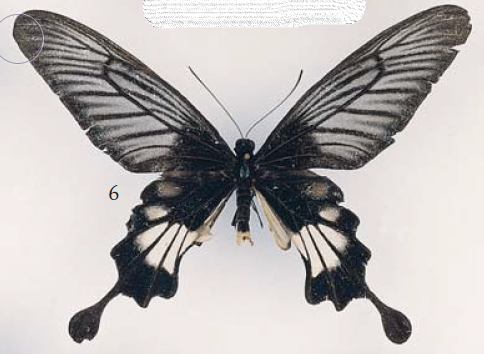
- male specimen

Conservation status
- Data Deficient (IUCN 2.3)

Scientific classification
- Kingdom: Animalia
- Phylum: Arthropoda
- Class: Insecta
- Order: Lepidoptera
- Family: Papilionidae
- Genus: Losaria
- Species: L. palu

Binomial name
- Losaria palu (Martin 1912)

Synonyms
- Atrophaneura palu (Martin, 1912)

= Losaria palu =

Species of butterfly

Losaria palu, the Palu swallowtail, is a species of butterfly in the family Papilionidae. It is endemic to the Indonesian island of Sulawesi. Its name is a reference to Palu, as the type specimen was captured in the highlands near the city, but it is also known from lower altitudes in the region. It is poorly known and has been regarded as a subspecies of Losaria coon.
