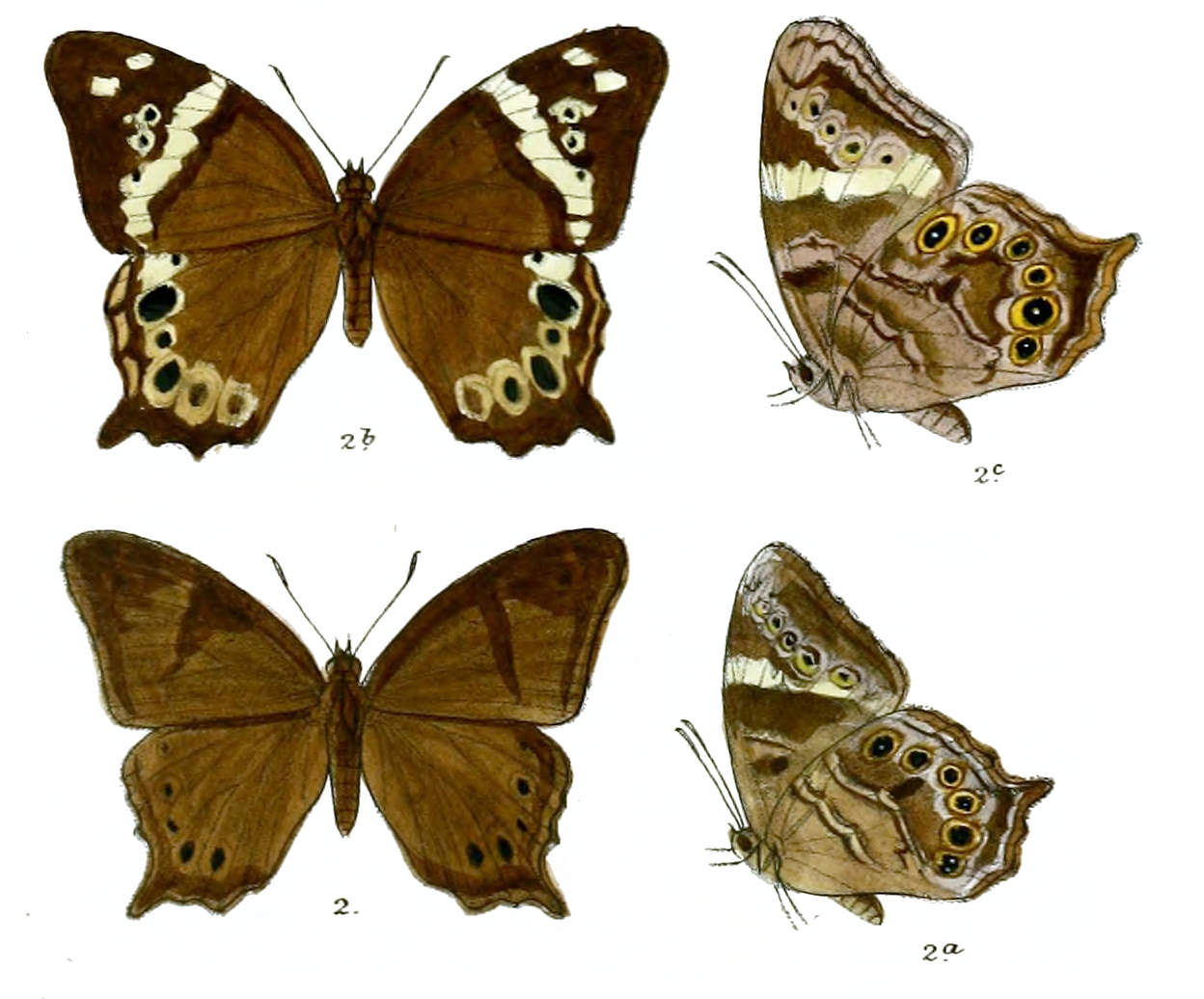

Scientific classification
- Kingdom: Animalia
- Phylum: Arthropoda
- Clade: Pancrustacea
- Class: Insecta
- Order: Lepidoptera
- Family: Nymphalidae
- Genus: Lethe
- Species: L. daretis

Binomial name
- Lethe daretis (Hewitson, [1863])

Synonyms
- Debis daretis Hewitson, [1863]; Lethe daretis (Hewitson, 1863)

= Lethe daretis =

Species of butterfly

Lethe daretis, the Sri Lanka treebrown, is a butterfly in the family Nymphalidae. It is endemic and restricted to cloud forests of central highlands of Sri Lanka such as Horton Plains.

== Description ==
Wingspan of adult is less than 30 mm. Sexes show sexual dimorphism. Male has dark brown dorsal surface, whereas female resemble female Lethe drypetis coloration. In male, a sub-marginal row of small black spots found on the hindwing. On forewing, yellowish brown patches appear near the upper margin. Ventral surface dark brown with purple tinge. All eye spots rounded. Eye spots on hindwing possess a yellow ring, which is lack on forewing eye spots. There is a whitish irregular oblique line on forewing. This white line is much broader in female. Host plant belongs to family Poaceae such as Arundinaria debilis.
