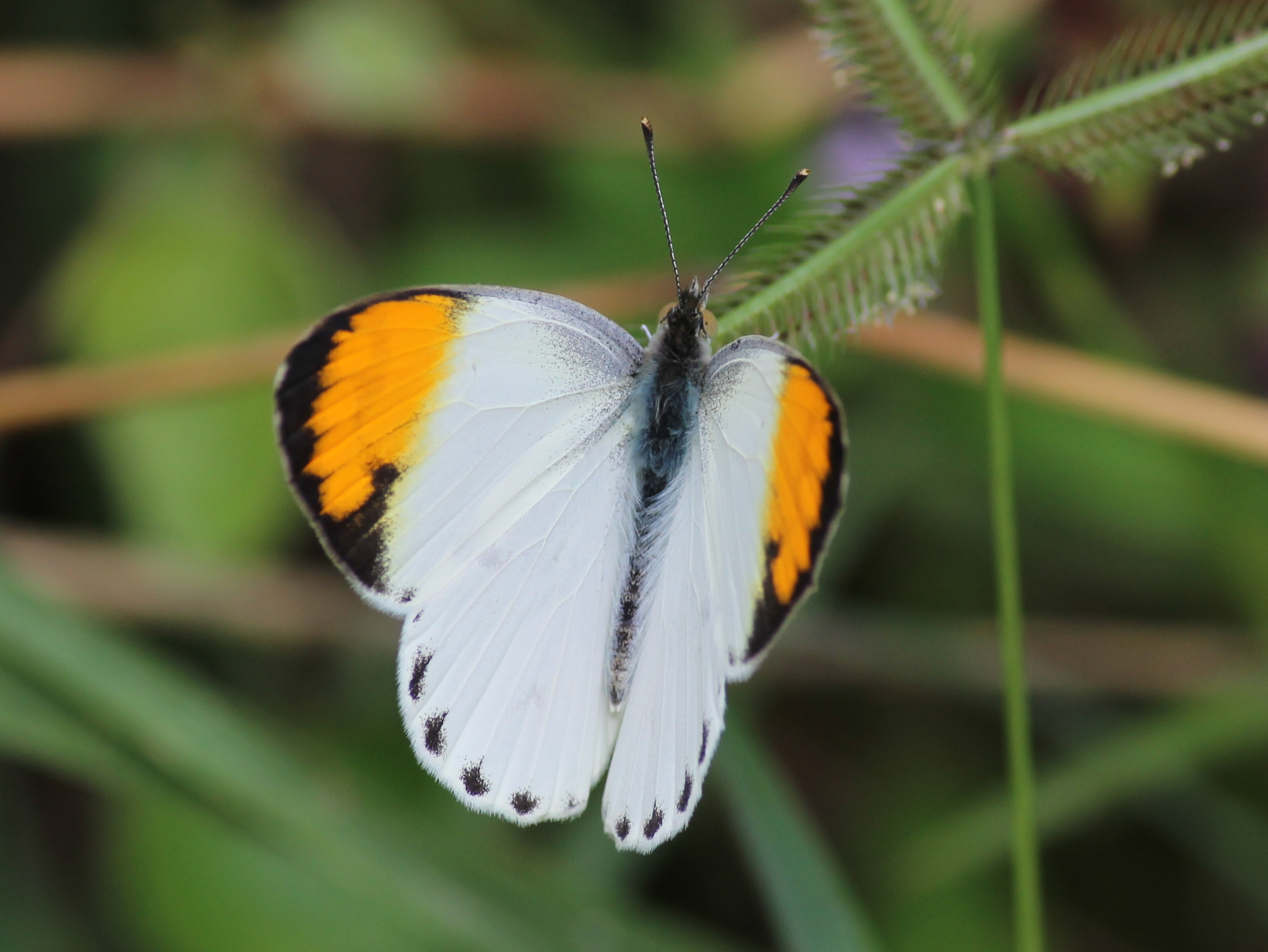
- Male, dorsal view
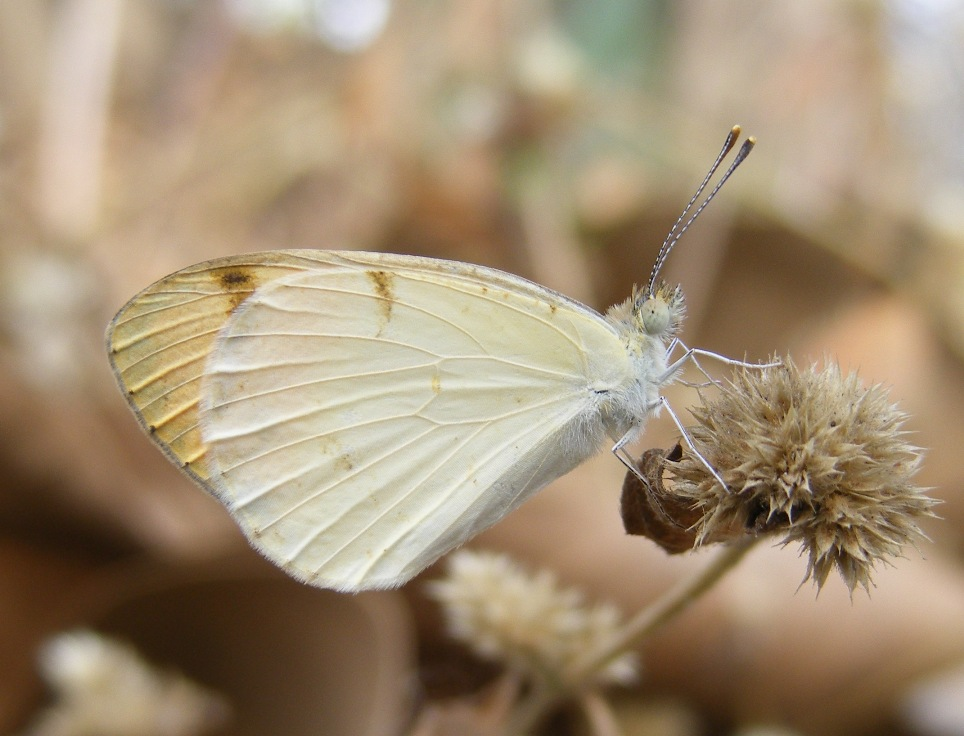
- Male, ventral view

Scientific classification
- Domain: Eukaryota
- Kingdom: Animalia
- Phylum: Arthropoda
- Class: Insecta
- Order: Lepidoptera
- Family: Pieridae
- Genus: Colotis
- Species: C. aurora

Binomial name
- Colotis aurora (Cramer, 1780)

Synonyms
- Papilio aurora Cramer, 1780; Papilio eucharis Fabricius, 1775; Pontia evarne Klug, 1829; Teracolus citreus Butler, 1876; Teracolus xanthevarne Butler, 1876; Teracolus philippsi Butler, 1886; Teracolus evarne philippsi f. sharpei Aurivillius, 1910; Teracolus evarne f. extrema Niepelt, 1937; Colotis eucharis; Colotis eucharis f. butleri Stoneham, 1939; Colotis eucharis f. mambrui Stoneham, 1939; Colotis eucharis f. xanthecolus Stoneham, 1939; Colotis eucharis f. albescens Stoneham, 1939; Colotis auxo harrarensis Dufrane, 1947; Colotis auxo harrarensis ab. maureli Dufrane, 1947

= Colotis aurora =

Species of butterfly

Colotis aurora, the sulphur orange tip or plain orange-tip, is a butterfly in the family Pieridae. It is found in Asia and Africa. The nominate subspecies, Colotis aurora aurora is found in India and Sri Lanka. The other subspecies, Colotis aurora evarne is found in Mauritania, Senegal, the Gambia, Mali, Burkina Faso, Ghana, Benin, Nigeria, Chad, Sudan, Ethiopia, Uganda, Kenya, Rwanda, Tanzania, the Democratic Republic of the Congo, Somalia, and southern Arabia.

The habitat consists of savanna and shrubland. The larvae feed on Capparaceae species, including Cadaba fruticosa.

== Taxonomy ==
This species was described by Pieter Cramer in 1780 as Papilio aurora. But many authors incorrectly mentioned this as Colotis eucharis Fabricius, 1775. This happened because Fabricius incorrectly placed Papilio eucharis Drury, 1773 as a synonym of Papilio hyparete Linnaeus, 1758 and applied the same name eucharis to this species. To resolve this confusion, Godart altered the oldest name (eucharis, Drury) to epicharis, instead of correcting the incorrectly imposed name (eucharis, Fabricius). Westwood reverted this change.

== Description ==
The upperside of the males has a pure white ground colour. The forewing has the base and costa speckled with black scales near the base; has a broad apical orange-yellow patch, with the inner edge straight and margined with gamboge yellow; the patch is sometimes without speckles, but often bears a black diffuse spot on its lower inner edge which may or may not extend to the termen below the orange; costa, apex and termen, the latter nearly up to the tornus, edged and festooned beyond the orange area with black. Hindwing of the male has black spots at the apices of the veins that vary in size and end on the termen, also a diffuse preapical black spot on the costa.

Underside is pure white in most specimens, suffused, except on the disc of the forewing, with pinkish yellow, and at base of the same wing with pure sulphur yellow; apical orange patch and black terminal markings on the upperside of the forewing show through by transparency, the former crossed by a sinuous fuscous band that ends in a black diffuse spot. Hindwing is shaded with ochraceous at base and with a fuscous preapical spot on costa, also a few scattered transverse fuscous striations and small spots. Many specimens have the preapical spot continued as an obscure fuscous band across the wing and bear a series of large terminal fuscous spots that correspond to the black spots on the upperside. Both forewing and hindwings with black discocellular dots. Antennae, head, thorax and abdomen black; antennae speckled with white on the sides, head and thorax clothed with short greyish-brown hairs; beneath the palpi, thorax and abdomen white.

Female has the ground colour similar to the male; the markings differ from those of the male as follows:

Upperside, forewing: base and costa more heavily irrorated with greyish-black scales; discocellular spot larger; apical area black, with three enclosed elongate orange spots; inner margin of black area irregularly sinuate and diffuse, extended shortly inwards in interspace 3; a transverse black spot across middle of interspace 1. Hindwing: base irrorated more sparsely than in the forewing with greyish-black scales; preapical spot on costa and terminal spots much larger; in a few specimens, there is an obscure transverse posterior discal fascia.

Underside: markings similar to but very much broader, more heavily marked, and more prominent than those in the male; the transverse fuscous stripe and dots are more numerous. Antennae, head, thorax and abdomen are as in the male.

== Subspecies ==
- Colotis aurora aurora (Asia, India, Sri Lanka)
- Colotis aurora evarne (Klug, 1829) (Mauritania, northern Senegal, the Gambia, Mali, Burkina Faso, Ghana, northern Benin, Nigeria, Chad, Sudan, Ethiopia, Uganda, Kenya, Tanzania, Rwanda, Democratic Republic of the Congo, Somalia, southern Arabia)

== See also ==
- List of butterflies of India
- List of butterflies of Sri Lanka
- List of butterflies of India (Pieridae)
