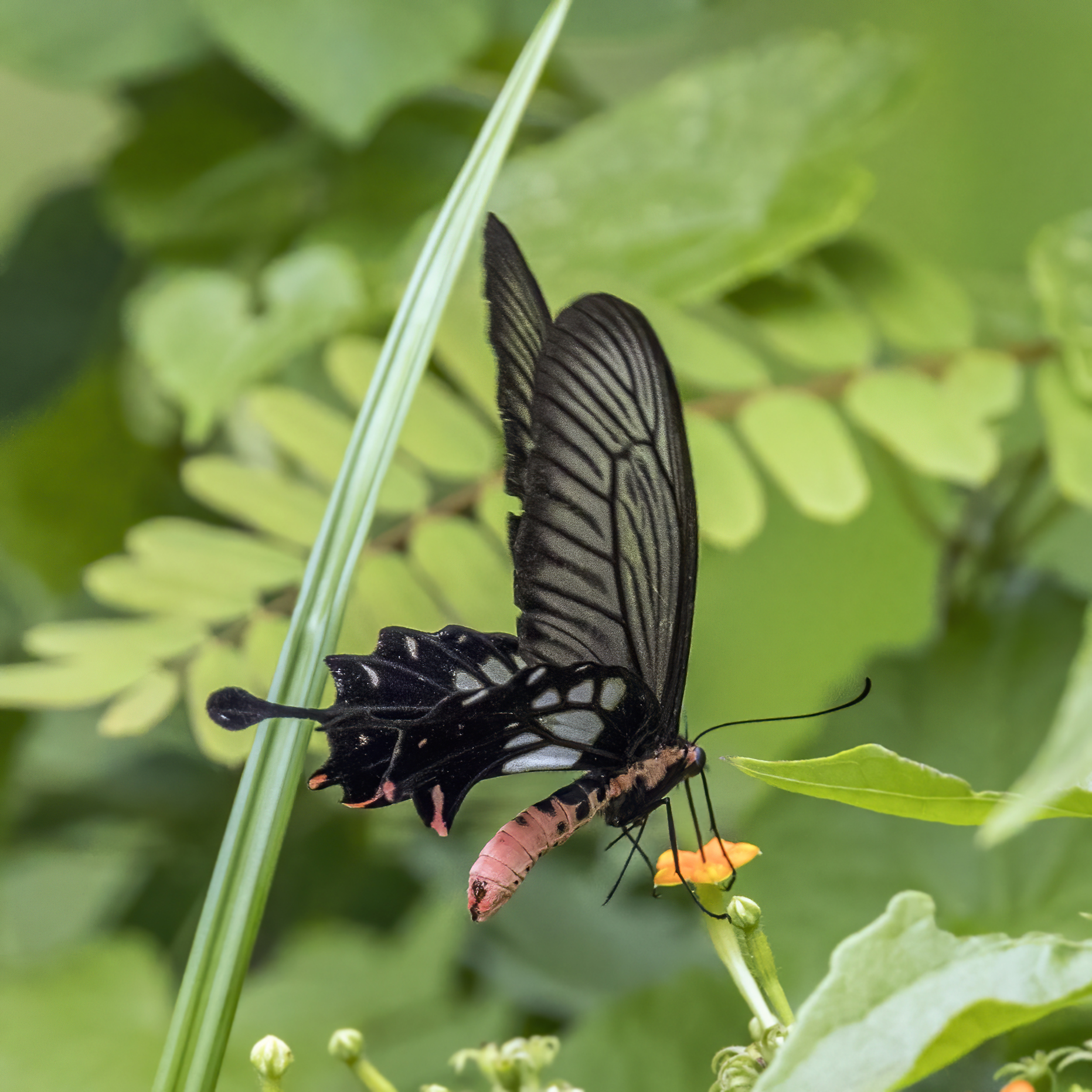
- male L. c. doubledayi, Thailand

Scientific classification
- Kingdom: Animalia
- Phylum: Arthropoda
- Clade: Pancrustacea
- Class: Insecta
- Order: Lepidoptera
- Family: Papilionidae
- Genus: Losaria
- Species: L. coon

Binomial name
- Losaria coon (Fabricius, 1793)

Synonyms
- Atrophaneura coon — Fabricius, 1793

= Losaria coon =

Common clubtail

Species of butterfly

Losaria coon, the common clubtail, is a butterfly belonging to the swallowtail family, Papilionidae. The butterfly belongs to the clubtails, genus Losaria. It includes several subspecies and is found from the Nicobar Islands and Assam in India, east to Hainan in China, and south through Indochina, to Java and other islands of Indonesia and Bangladesh.

== Description ==
The butterfly has a wingspan of 100 to 120 millimetres (3.9 to 4.7 in). Both sexes are generally alike, however the females have broader wings and shorter hindwing tails. The butterfly has long and narrow wings and a characteristic spatulate tail, which gives it its name. The forewing is black with pale markings between the veins. Two-thirds of the cell of the hindwing is white with a row of white spots around it. It has crimson or dusky white lunules along the margin and disc.

Detailed description as given in Bingham (1907) is as follows:

Male upperside dull black, paler on the fore than on the hind wing. Fore wing with very conspicuous pale streaks, two in each interspace that extend well into the cell, but do not reach the termen, where the dull black ground-colour forms a broadish transverse band. Hind wing black, with in fresh specimens in certain lights a beautiful blue gloss; a central large white area composed of a white patch in the apical two-thirds of the cell and more or less elongate spots of varying breadth at base of interspaces 1-7, all these very distinctly divided by the broadly black-bordered veins, the spot in interspace 4 more or less obsolescent; lastly, a subterminal row of more or less crescentic white spots, the lower two shaded with crimson followed by a crimson tornal and a terminal similar but brighter spot at apex of vein 3, the spatulate tail black. Underside similar; the ground-colour duller. Hind wing: a white discal spot often in interspace below vein 1, the lower two spots of the terminal series entirely crimson. Antennae, thorax and abdomen above up to the preanal segment black; head, palpi, sides of the thorax and rest of the abdomen crimson, the abdomen with black lateral spots.
Female similar; fore wing paler. Hind wing: the central white markings larger, the subterminal spot in interspace 2 white, coalescent with the crimson tornal spot. Antennae, head, thorax and abdomen as in the male

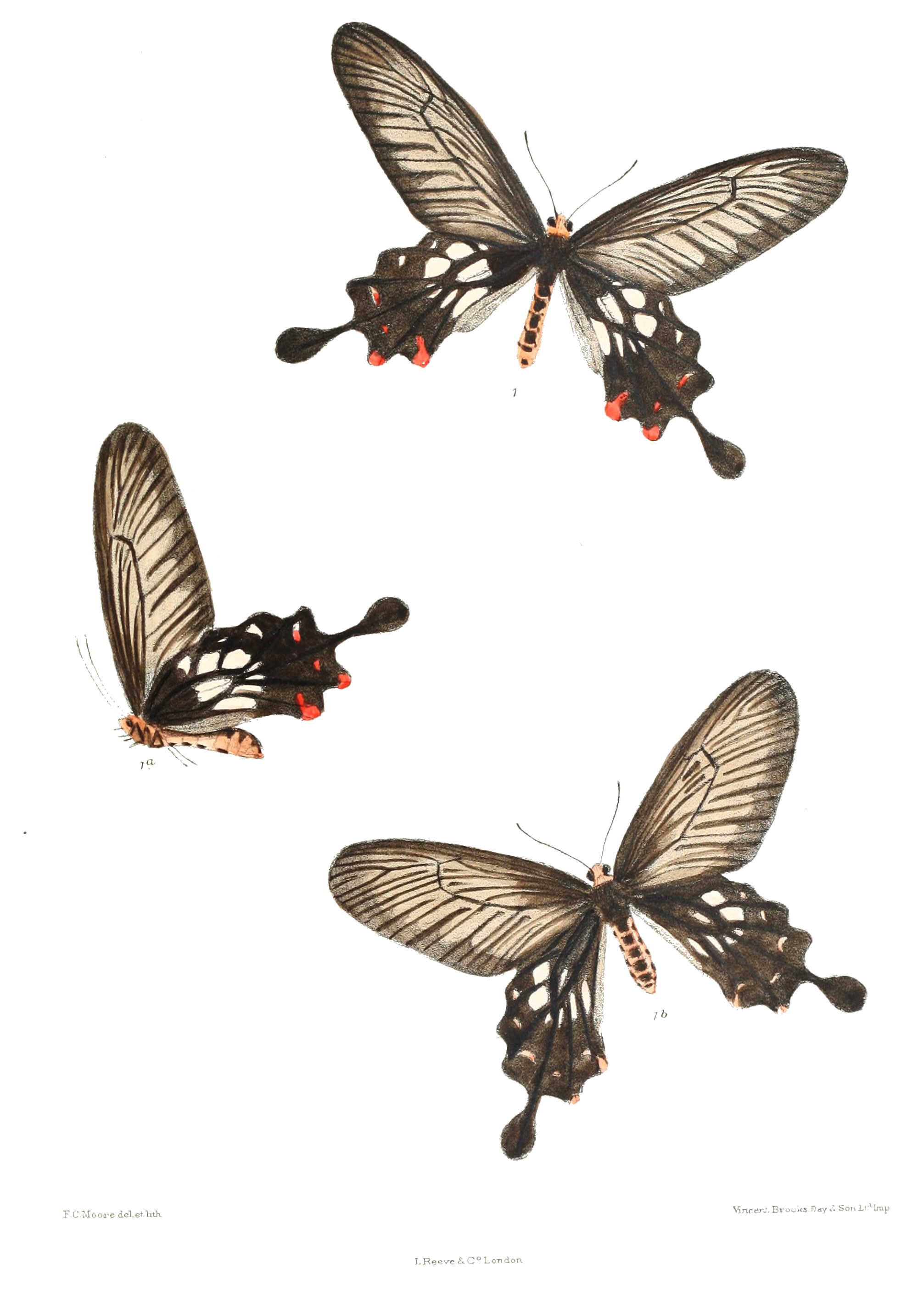
L. c. cacharensis

Bingham describes race cacharensis, Butler, the subspecies found in Cachar (Assam) as follows:

Males and females smaller, with the ground-colour duller and the discal white spots on the hind wing conspicuously-reduced in size. According to Rothschild the subterminal and terminal markings are also paler, often yellowish red. Head, sides of breast and abdomen of a yellowish-red instead of vermilion-red.

== Distribution ==
The common clubtail is a woodland species which may be found both in the plains and the hills. This butterfly is found in Assam, Manipur and the Nicobar Islands (India), through mainland Southeast Asia, east to Hainan (China), and south to the Indonesian islands of Sumatra, Java and Bawean. It is absent from Borneo.

=== Subspecies ===
Losaria coon has four subspecies, excluding the former L. palu, now regarded as the separate species Losaria palu (Palu clubtail) and L. doubledayi, which is now regarded as the separate species Losaria doubledayi (Common clubtail).

There are four subspecies reported for this species:

- the nominate subspecies coon
- sangkapurae (Bollino and Sala, 1992)
- palembanganus (Rothschild, 1896)
- patianus (Fruhstorfer, 1898)

== Habits ==
It has been recorded in Manipur during February and April and from July to October. The distinctive black and yellow/orange/red (depending on subspecies) markings and slow flight indicate that it is a protected butterfly being inedible due to sequestration of certain chemicals from the plants that the caterpillar feeds on.

=== Food plant ===
- Apama tomentosa

== Life cycle ==
The caterpillar is variable in colour and ranges from reddish grey to black and has many black spots and stripes.

== See also ==
- List of butterflies of South Asia
- List of butterflies of India (Papilionidae)

== Additional references ==
- Carter, David. (1992, 2000) Dorling Kindersley Handbook of Butterflies and Moths. London. ISBN 0-7513-2707-7
- Evans, W.H. (1932). The Identification of Indian Butterflies (2nd ed.). Mumbai, India: Bombay Natural History Society.
- Haribal, Meena (1992). The Butterflies of Sikkim Himalaya and Their Natural History. Gangtok, Sikkim, India: Sikkim Nature Conservation Foundation.
- Rahman, M.S., Haidar, I.K.A., Neogi, A.K., Hasan, M.A.U., Rahman, M.M. and Imam, S.M.S 2016. First record of six species and subspecies of butterflies (Insecta: Lepidoptera) in Bangladesh. Journal of Insect Biodiversity and Systematics, 2 (3): 373–380.
- Wynter-Blyth, Mark Alexander (1957). Butterflies of the Indian Region. Bombay, India: Bombay Natural History Society. ISBN 978-8170192329.
