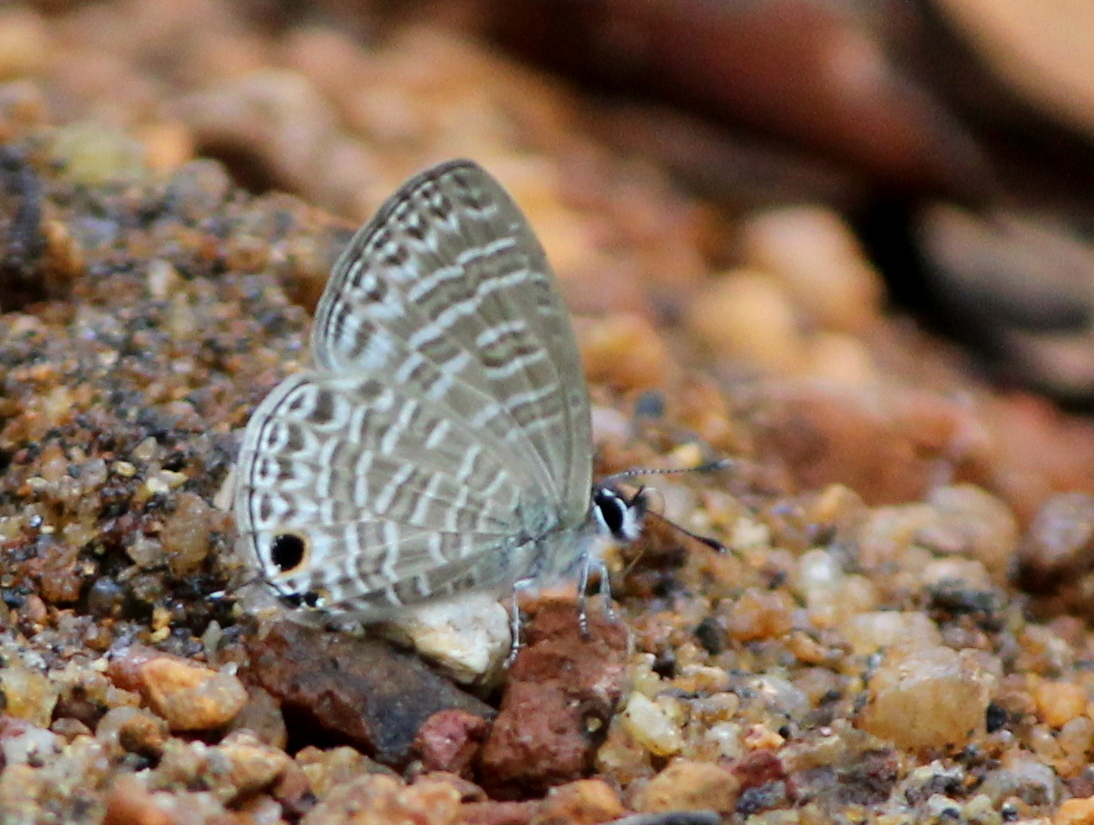
- N.s.ramaswamii from Kerala

Scientific classification
- Domain: Eukaryota
- Kingdom: Animalia
- Phylum: Arthropoda
- Class: Insecta
- Order: Lepidoptera
- Family: Lycaenidae
- Genus: Nacaduba
- Species: N. sinhala

Binomial name
- Nacaduba sinhala (Ormiston, 1924)

Synonyms
- Lycaena atratus Horsfield, [1828]; Nacaduba berenice ceylonica Fruhstorfer, 1916

= Nacaduba sinhala =

Species of butterfly

Nacaduba sinhala, the Pale Ceylon line blue, or Ceylon six-lineblue, is a species of Lycaenidae butterfly. It is endemic to Western Ghats complex (Western Ghats and Sri Lanka).

== Description ==
Wingspan is about 18–28 mm. Clearly distinguished due to whitish discal area and terminating three large whitish post discal spots on upper surface of the fore wing in male. In male apex round, wings transparent. There is a silvery tint with a trace of eyespot on tornus in hindwing. Female has bluish dorsum and bands irrorated with silvery white with dark blue. Larval host plants are Embelia tsjeriam-cottam and Ardisia humilis. A new subspecies, N. s. ramaswamii, was discovered in Pothigai in 2021.
