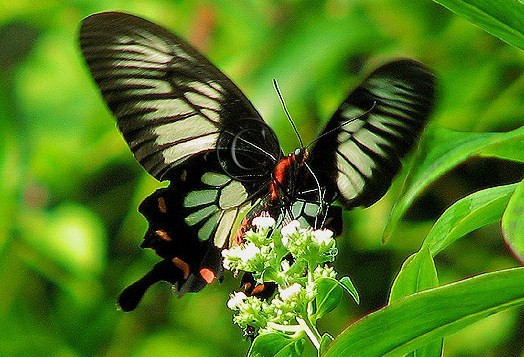

Conservation status
- Endangered (IUCN 3.1)
- CITES Appendix II (CITES)

Scientific classification
- Kingdom: Animalia
- Phylum: Arthropoda
- Class: Insecta
- Order: Lepidoptera
- Family: Papilionidae
- Genus: Pachliopta
- Species: P. jophon

Binomial name
- Pachliopta jophon Gray, [1853]

Synonyms
- Atrophaneura jophon

= Pachliopta jophon =

Ceylon rose

Species of butterfly

Pachliopta jophon, the Ceylon rose or Sri Lankan rose, is a butterfly found in Sri Lanka that belongs to the swallowtail family. It was earlier classified as a subspecies of Pachliopta hector, the crimson rose.

== Range ==
It is endemic to Sri Lanka, confined to the rain forests of the central hill country in the south-west.

== Description ==
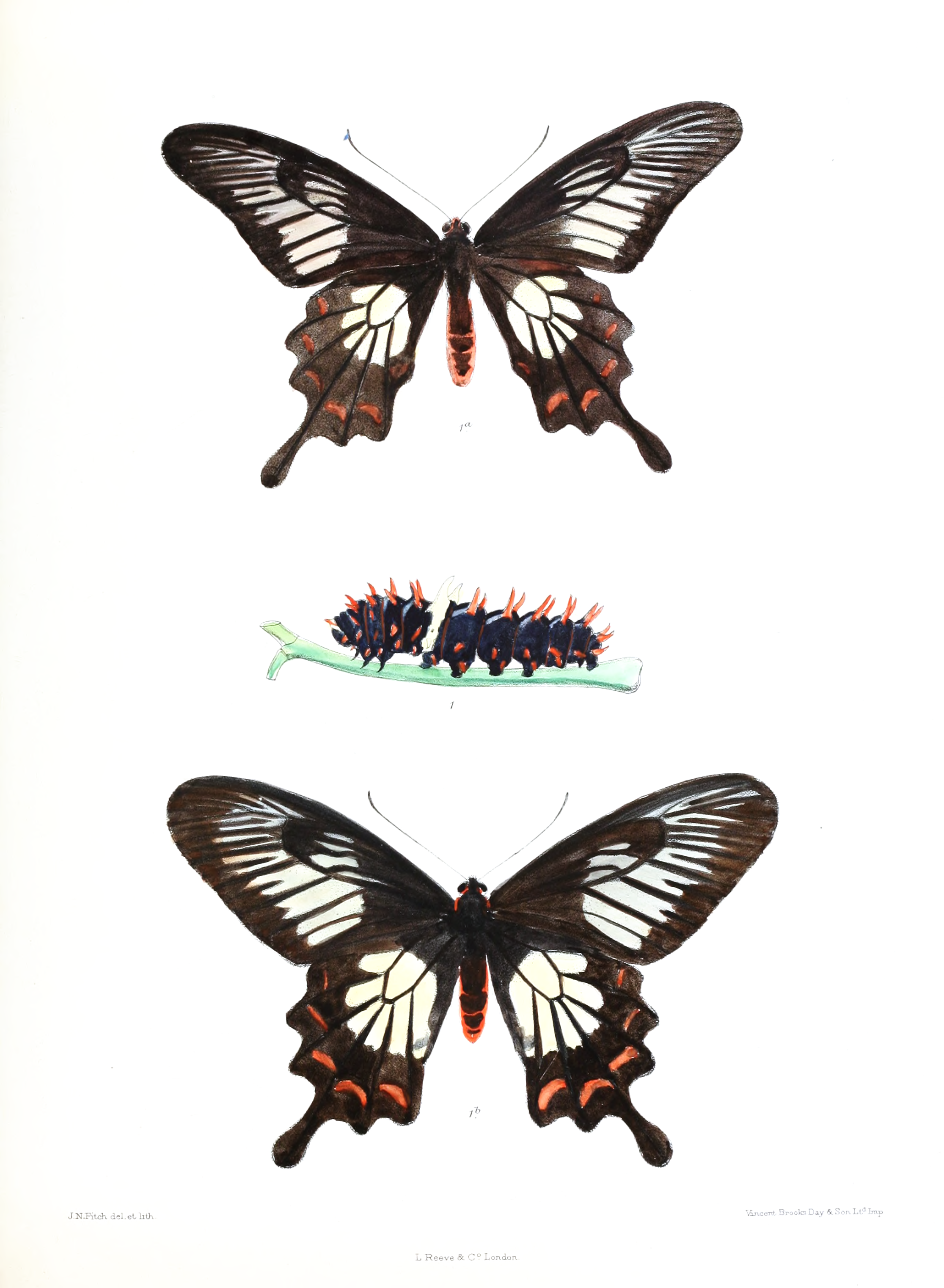

The male upperside is black. The forewing has three or four broad white streaks in a cell and a variable number of similar somewhat broader streaks that are bifid along their apical half in the interspaces beyond; these streaks do not reach the terminal margin and become obsolete towards the costal margin of the wing. The hindwing is in the apical half of the cell and short apically truncate streaks in the interspaces beyond white; these broad streaks broad are divided only by the black veins, followed by a subterminal curved series of crimson lunules irrorated with black scales. The underside is similar, the markings more distinct and more sharply defined; the discal white streaks and the subterminal series of crimson spots are each seven in number. The antennae, head, thorax, and abdomen above up to the pre-anal segment are black; the head in front and beneath, the thorax at the sides and the apical half of the abdomen crimson, the last with one or two black lateral spots. The female is similar, but the forewing is broader, the white and crimson markings larger and more conspicuous.

== Status ==
It is critically endangered, declining due to loss of habitat.

== See also ==
- Papilionidae
- List of butterflies of India
- List of butterflies of India (Papilionidae)
