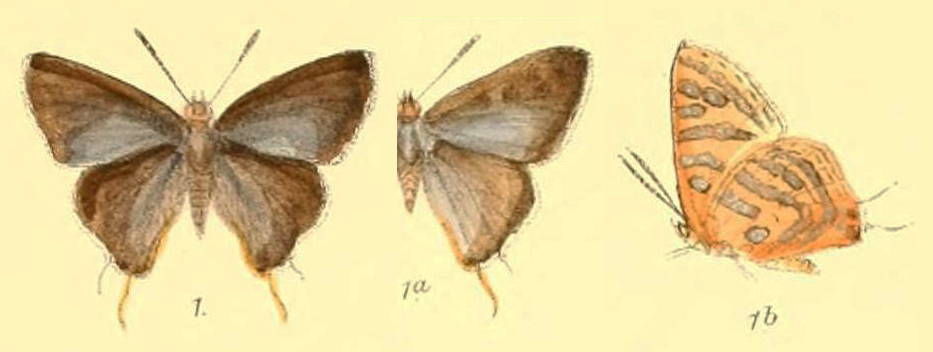

Scientific classification
- Kingdom: Animalia
- Phylum: Arthropoda
- Clade: Pancrustacea
- Class: Insecta
- Order: Lepidoptera
- Family: Lycaenidae
- Genus: Cigaritis
- Species: C. nubilus

Binomial name
- Cigaritis nubilus (Moore, [1887])

Synonyms
- Aphnaeus nubilus Moore, [1887]; Spindasis nubilus (Moore); Evans, 1927

= Cigaritis nubilus =

Clouded silverline

Species of butterfly

The clouded silverline, Cigaritis nubilus (sometimes Aphnaeus nubilus), is a species of lycaenid or blue butterfly. It is endemic to Sri Lanka. The clouded silverline is an example of automimicry, featuring a false head and false antennae at the base of its wings meant to disorient predators.
