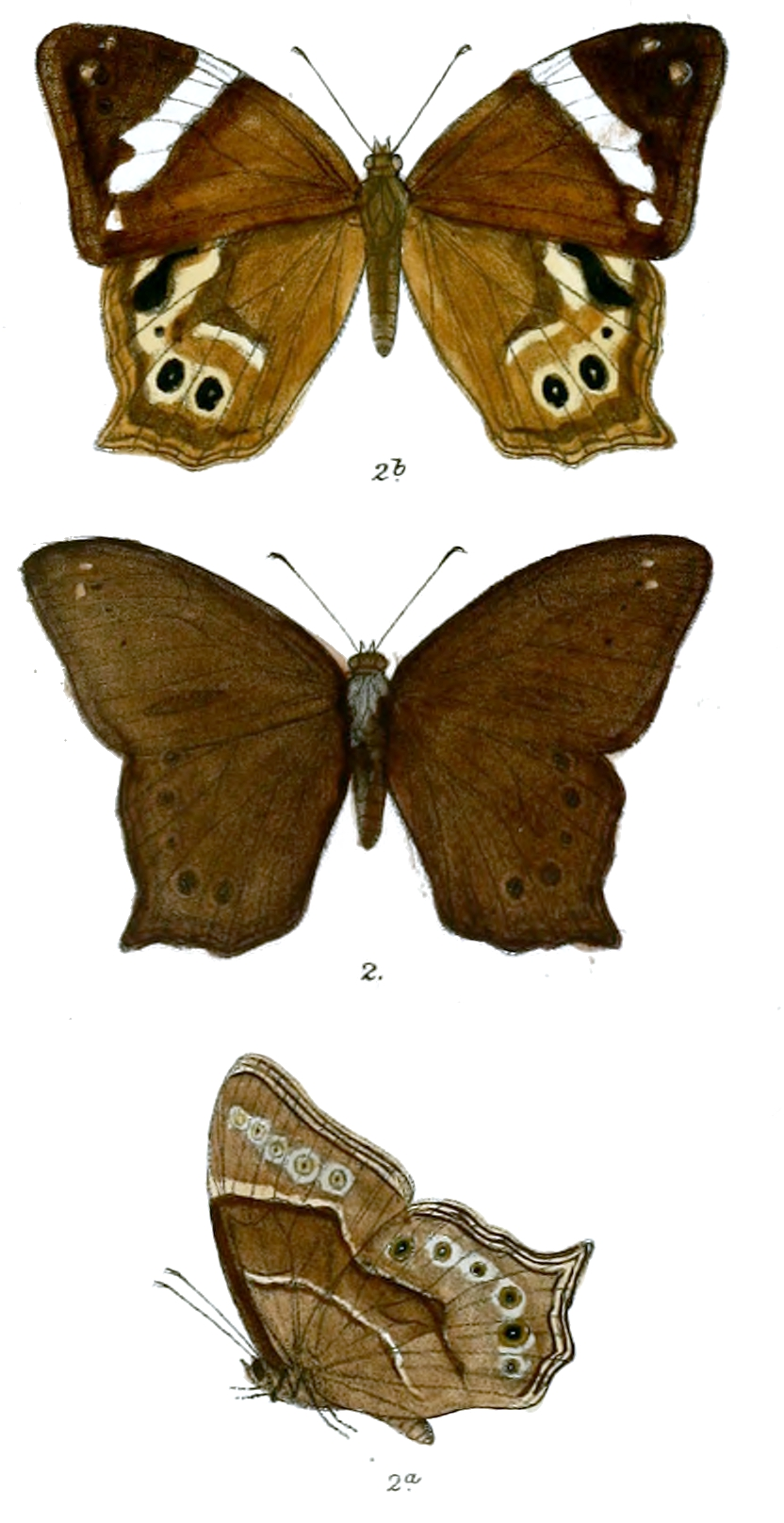

Scientific classification
- Kingdom: Animalia
- Phylum: Arthropoda
- Class: Insecta
- Order: Lepidoptera
- Family: Nymphalidae
- Genus: Lethe
- Species: L. dynsate

Binomial name
- Lethe dynsate (Hewitson, [1863])

Synonyms
- Lethe sihala Moore, 1872; Debis dynsate Hewitson, [1863]

= Lethe dynsate =

Species of butterfly

Lethe dynsate, the Ceylon forester, is a butterfly in the family Nymphalidae. It is endemic to Sri Lanka.

== Description ==
Sexes show sexual dimorphism. Male has dark brown dorsal surface, whereas female pale brown coloration. In male, dorsal surface is unmarked except few small dark eyespots. Ventral surface is heavily shaded. Tornal area possess a series of eye spots ringed with purple. In female, dorsal surface possess creamy brown sub apical stripe on forewing. Series of large eyespots and wavy lines found on the sub marginal area of hind wing. Host plant belongs to family Poaceae such as Arundinaria debilis.
