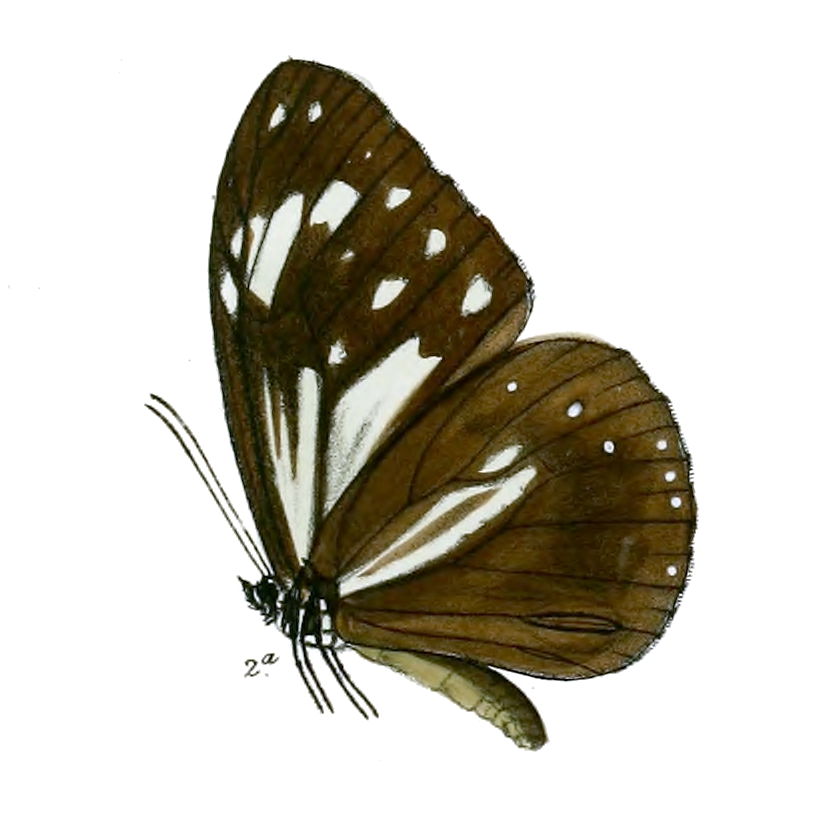

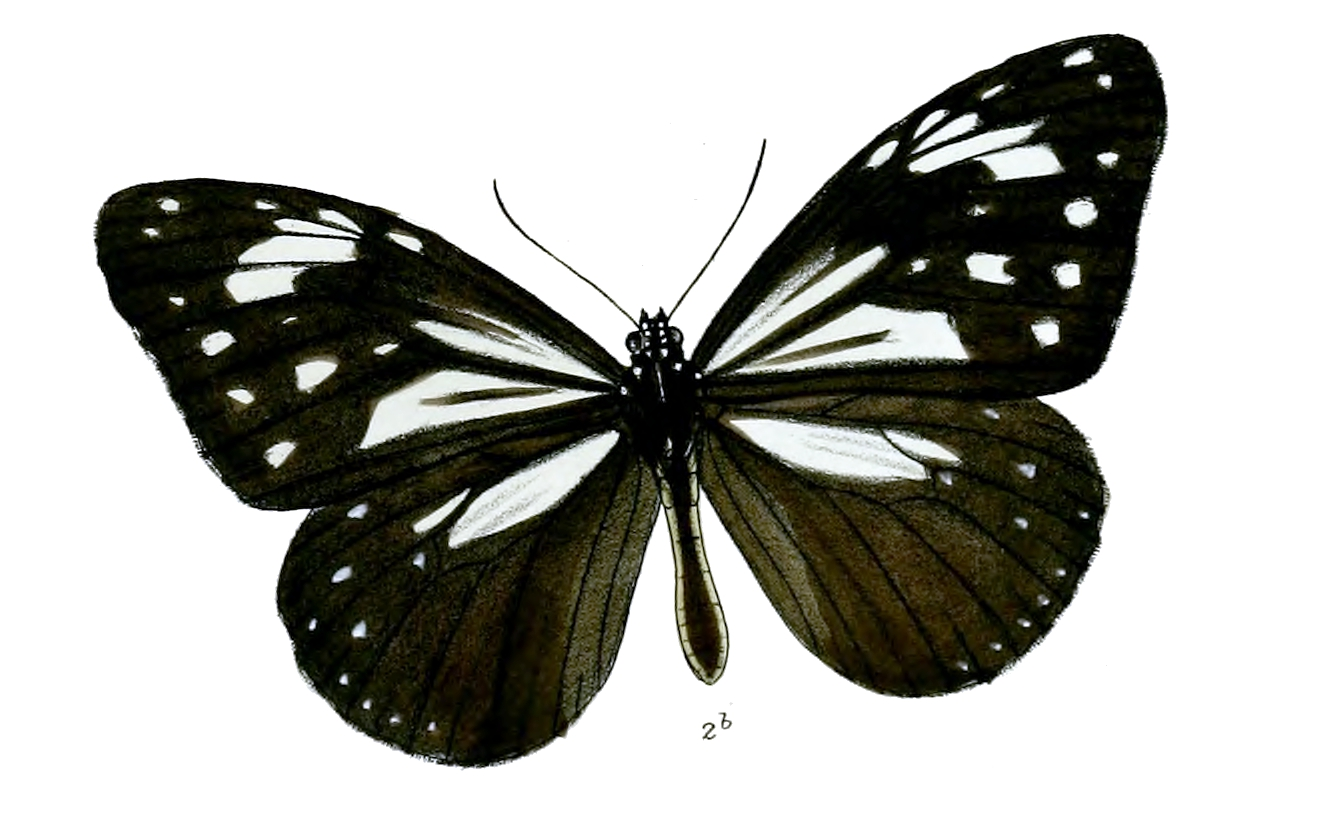

Conservation status
- Near Threatened (IUCN 2.3)

Scientific classification
- Kingdom: Animalia
- Phylum: Arthropoda
- Clade: Pancrustacea
- Class: Insecta
- Order: Lepidoptera
- Family: Nymphalidae
- Genus: Parantica
- Species: P. taprobana

Binomial name
- Parantica taprobana (Felder & Felder, 1865)

Synonyms
- Chittira fumata

= Ceylon tiger =

Species of butterfly

The Ceylon tiger (Parantica taprobana) is a species of nymphalid butterfly in the Danainae subfamily. It is endemic to Sri Lanka.
