= Arhopala ormistoni =

Aberrant oakblue

Scientific classification
- Kingdom: Animalia
- Phylum: Arthropoda
- Clade: Pancrustacea
- Class: Insecta
- Order: Lepidoptera
- Family: Lycaenidae
- Genus: Arhopala
- Species: A. ormistoni

Binomial name
- Arhopala ormistoni (Hewitson, 1862)

Synonyms
- Narathura ormistoni (Riley); Evans, 1957

Species of butterfly

Arhopala ormistoni, the Ormiston's oakblue, is a species of lycaenid or blue butterfly. It is endemic to Sri Lanka.

== Description ==
Male both upperside wings uniformly violet blue.Female upperside uniformly brown. Below both sexes light grey brown conspicuously whitened.
