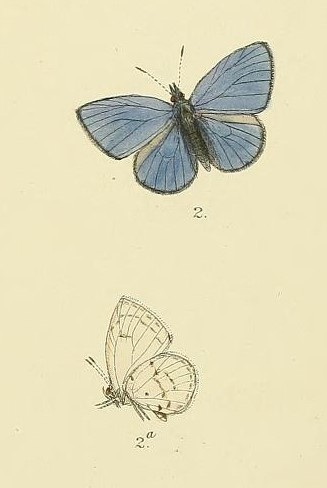

Scientific classification
- Kingdom: Animalia
- Phylum: Arthropoda
- Class: Insecta
- Order: Lepidoptera
- Family: Lycaenidae
- Genus: Udara
- Species: U. lanka

Binomial name
- Udara lanka Moore, 1877

Synonyms
- Lycaenopsis lanka, Polyommatus lanka, Cyaniris lanka

= Udara lanka =

Ceylon hedge blue

Species of butterfly

Udara lanka, the Ceylon hedge blue, is a small butterfly found in Sri Lanka that belongs to the lycaenids or blues family.

== Description ==
Male upperside: uniform purplish blue; an extremely narrow bordering of black to the termen of both the forewings and hindwings present in a few specimens, absent in most; also the hindwing is slightly shaded with dusky black along the costa. Underside: shining silvery white. Forewings and hindwings with the usual Cyaniris markings but the postdiscal transverse series of abbreviated pale brown lines on the former almost in line one with the other, the whole series placed slightly obliquely on the wing and appreciably curved. On the hindwing the markings are small and regular, the lower discal series of spots bisinuate. The transverse lunular line beyond the discal markings that is comparatively distinct in most forms, is in this barely indicated on both forewings and hindwings. Antennae, head, thorax and abdomen dusky black; beneath: the palpi, thorax and abdomen snow white.

Female upperside: differs from the male in the ground colour which is slightly paler and on the forewing by the very broad costal and terminal blackish-brown border; on the hindwing by the similar border to the costal margin, the slightly broader black anteciliary line and a posterior subterminal series of somewhat indistinct black spots. Underside, antennae, head, thorax and abdomen as in the male.

== Taxonomy ==
The butterfly was earlier known as Lycaenopsis lanka Moore, Cyaniris lanka, and later as Polyommatus lanka.

== Range ==
It is found in Sri Lanka.

== See also ==
- List of butterflies of India
- List of butterflies of India (Lycaenidae)

== Bibliography ==
- Beccaloni, George; Scoble, Malcolm; Kitching, Ian; Simonsen, Thomas; Robinson, Gaden; Pitkin, Brian; Hine, Adrian; Lyal, Chris. "The Global Lepidoptera Names Index (LepIndex)". Natural History Museum, London.
- Evans, W.H. (1932). The Identification of Indian Butterflies (2nd ed.). Mumbai, India: Bombay Natural History Society.
