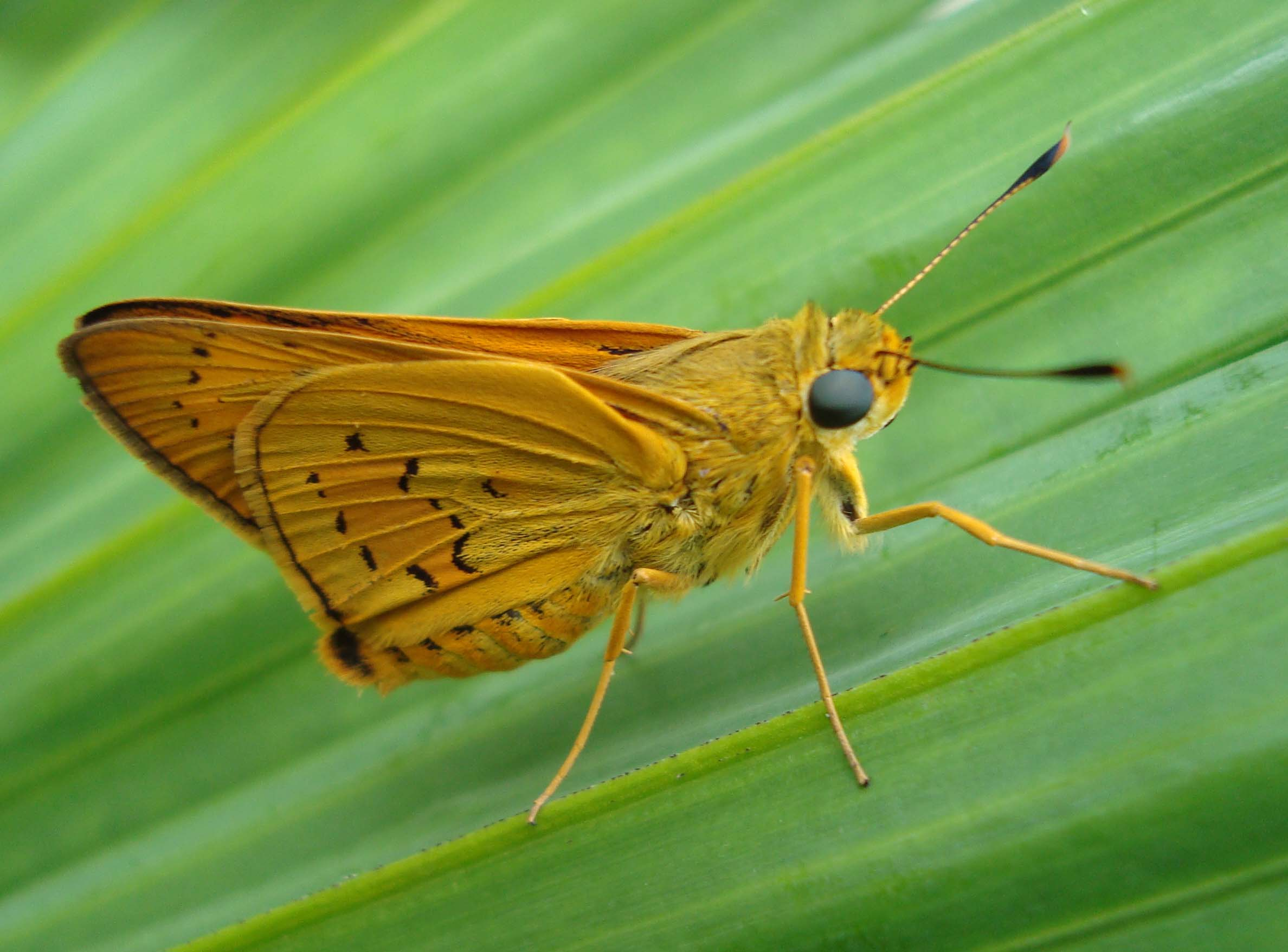

Scientific classification
- Kingdom: Animalia
- Phylum: Arthropoda
- Class: Insecta
- Order: Lepidoptera
- Family: Hesperiidae
- Genus: Thoressa
- Species: T. decorata

Binomial name
- Thoressa decorata (Moore, [1881])

Synonyms
- Halpe decorata Moore, [1881]

= Thoressa decorata =

Decorated ace

Species of butterfly

Thoressa decorata, the decorated ace, is a butterfly belonging to the family Hesperiidae. It was first described by Frederic Moore in 1881 and is endemic to Sri Lanka in the Indomalayan realm.
