= Nacaduba ollyetti =

Scientific classification
- Domain: Eukaryota
- Kingdom: Animalia
- Phylum: Arthropoda
- Class: Insecta
- Order: Lepidoptera
- Family: Lycaenidae
- Genus: Nacaduba
- Species: N. ollyetti

Binomial name
- Nacaduba ollyetti Corbet, 1947

Species of butterfly

Nacaduba ollyetti, the Woodhouse's four-line blue, is a species of Lycaenidae butterfly. It is endemic to Sri Lanka.

== Description ==
Wingspan is about 30–32 mm. Dorsal surface of male is brown with purple blue or deep purple tinge. Female has more bluish tinge on paler metallic blue dorsal surface. Tornus with a large eyespot. Underside of male is faintly visible with streaks, otherwise it appears as unmarked to naked eye.
