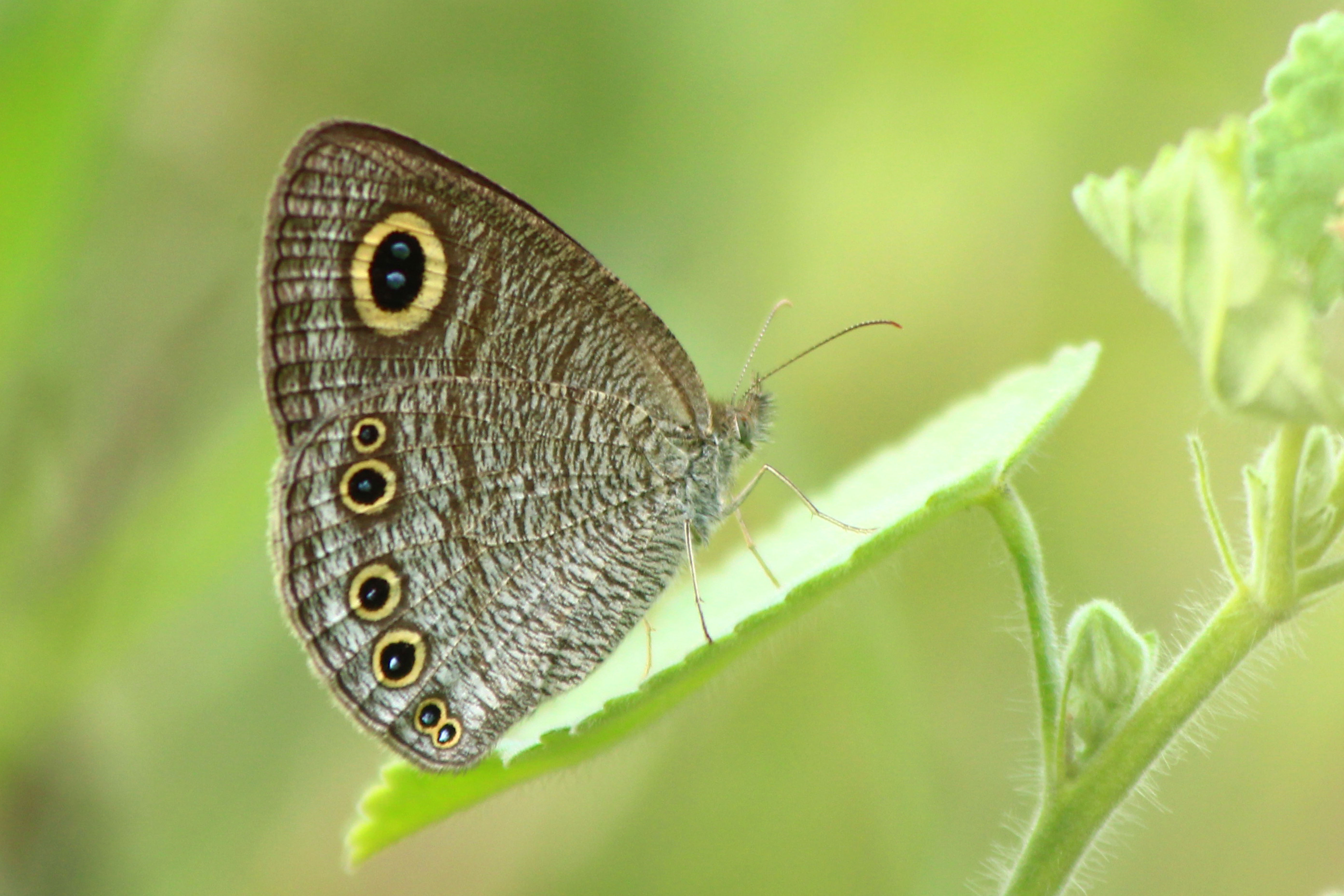

Scientific classification
- Kingdom: Animalia
- Phylum: Arthropoda
- Class: Insecta
- Order: Lepidoptera
- Family: Nymphalidae
- Genus: Ypthima
- Species: Y. singala

Binomial name
- Ypthima singala Felder, 1868

= Ypthima singala =

Sinhalese five-ring

Species of butterfly

Ypthima singala, the jewel four-ring or Sinhalese five-ring, is a species of Satyrinae butterfly. It is endemic to Sri Lanka and south India.

== Description ==
Adult Ypthima singala show sexual dimorphism. In male specimens, the dorsal surface of both wings is brownish and one large eye-spot and a series of smaller eyespots are found on the ventral surface of the forewing. This large eyespot can be seen very faintly on the dorsal surface. In female specimens, a prominent eye-spot is found on the dorsal surface of the forewing. Few small eyespots are found above the outer margin of the hind wing. Larval food plant is Axonopus compressus.
