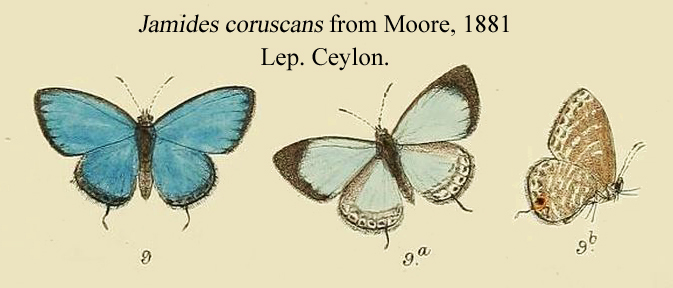

Scientific classification
- Kingdom: Animalia
- Phylum: Arthropoda
- Class: Insecta
- Order: Lepidoptera
- Family: Lycaenidae
- Genus: Jamides
- Species: J. coruscans

Binomial name
- Jamides coruscans (Moore, 1877)

Synonyms
- Lampides coruscans Moore, 1877; Jamides coruscans (Moore) Hirowatari, 1992

= Jamides coruscans =

Ceylon cerulean

Species of butterfly

Jamides coruscans, the Ceylon cerulean, is a small butterfly endemic to Sri Lanka that belongs to the lycaenids or blues family.

== Description ==
Wingspan is about 25–30 mm. Larval host plant is Humboldtia laurifolia.
