= Jamides lacteata =

Milky cerulean

Scientific classification
- Kingdom: Animalia
- Phylum: Arthropoda
- Class: Insecta
- Order: Lepidoptera
- Family: Lycaenidae
- Genus: Jamides
- Species: J. lacteata

Binomial name
- Jamides lacteata (de Nicéville, 1895)

Synonyms
- Lampides lacteata de Nicéville, 1895

Species of butterfly

Jamides lacteata, the milky cerulean, is a small butterfly found in India that belongs to the lycaenids or blues family.

== Description ==
Male upperside: a uniform pale purplish blue slightly paler than in L. elpis. Forewings and hindwings: very slender black anteciliary lines. Forewing: narrowly fuscous at apex; hindwing: a very slender terminal white thread before the anteciliary black line and a small black subterminal spot in interspace 1 edged inwardly with white, above which is a very obscure, short, transverse fuscous line. Cilia of both wings brown, with on the hindwing a white line at the base; tail black tipped with white. Underside: pale uniform greyish brown; discal and inner markings on both forewings and hindwings almost identical with those of true L. elpis, and precisely similar to those in many varieties from Sikkim and Assam, of that form. Terminal markings on both wings differ only in the two transverse subterminal white lines which are lunular and not straight. On the hindwing these lines are not however, nearly so prominently made up of lunules as in L. subdita. Antennae, head, thorax and abdomen as in L. elpis.

Female. Still more closely resembles the same sex of L. elpis, but the ground colour on the upperside is nearly white suffused with purplish blue towards the base of the wings and the black area on the apex and terminal margin is very broad. On the underside the markings are as in its own male.

== See also ==
- List of butterflies of India
- List of butterflies of India (Lycaenidae)
