= List of butterflies of South Asia =

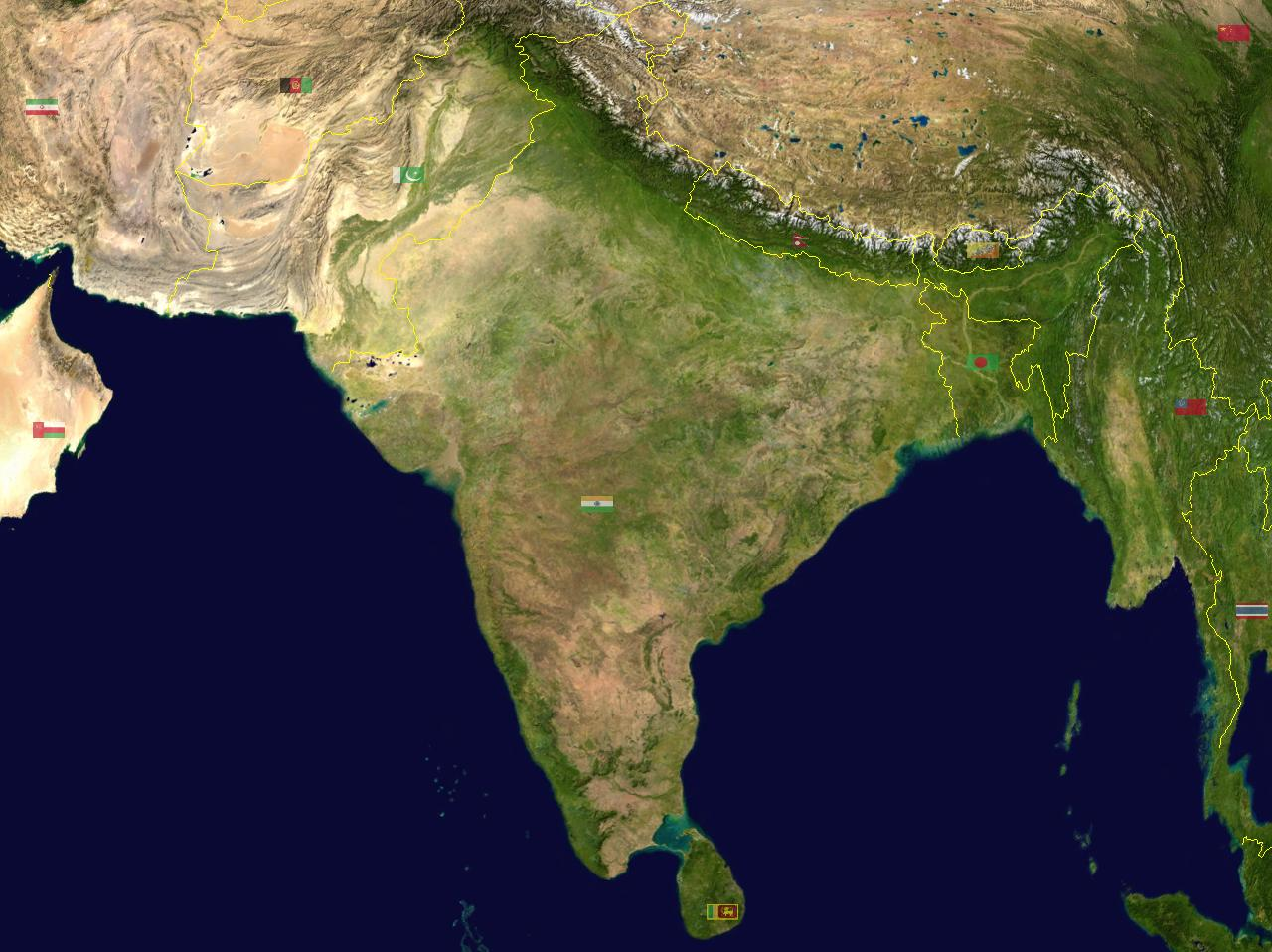
Composite satellite image of South Asia

South Asia is considered to include seven regions/countries. The lists of butterflies found in each individual country are given on these pages:

- List of butterflies of India
- List of butterflies of Pakistan
- List of butterflies of Bangladesh
- List of butterflies of Bhutan
- List of butterflies of Sri Lanka
- List of butterflies of Nepal
- List of butterflies of the Maldives
