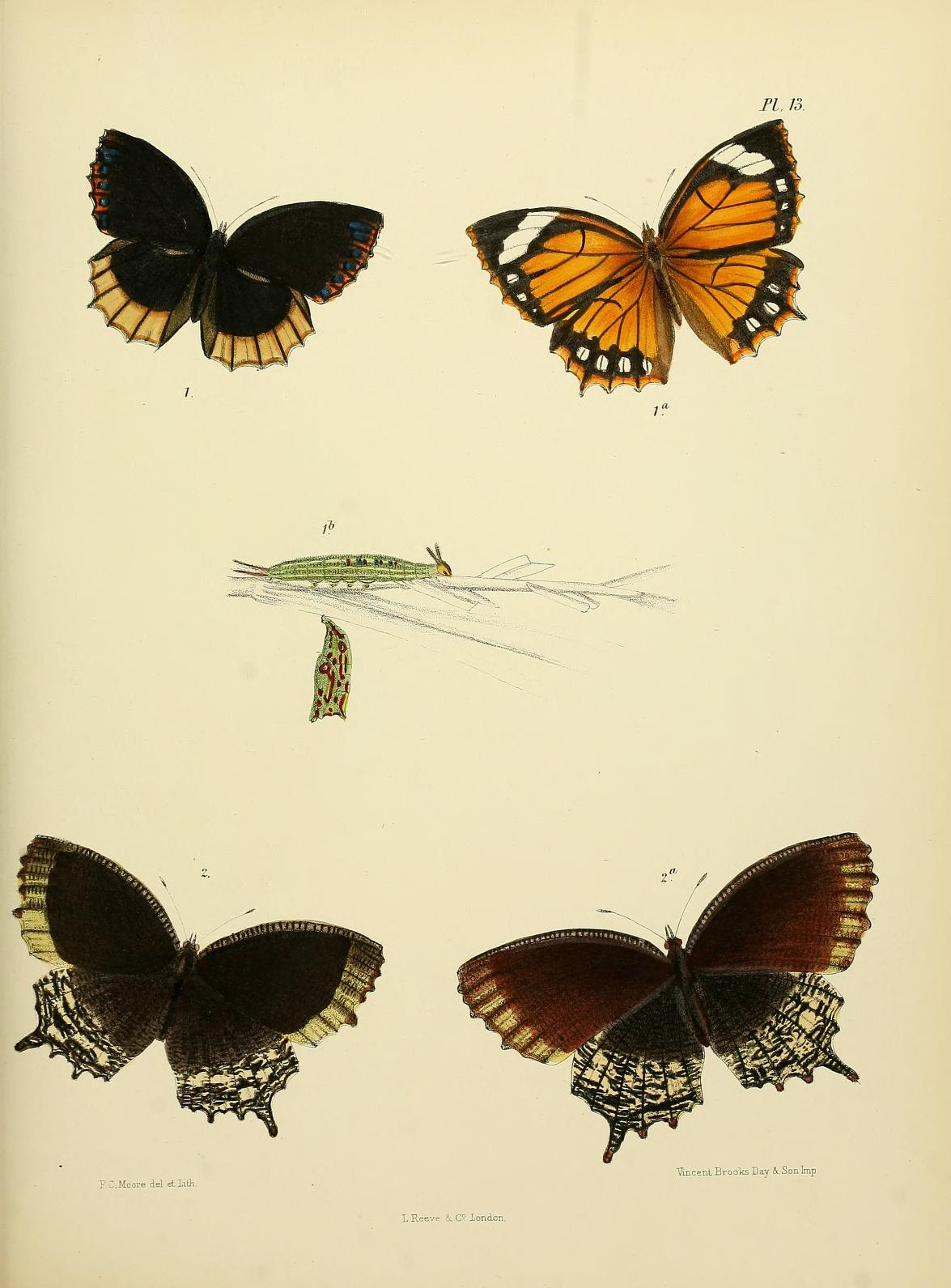

Scientific classification
- Kingdom: Animalia
- Phylum: Arthropoda
- Clade: Pancrustacea
- Class: Insecta
- Order: Lepidoptera
- Family: Nymphalidae
- Genus: Elymnias
- Species: E. singhala

Binomial name
- Elymnias singhala Moore, [1875]

= Elymnias singhala =

Species of butterfly

Elymnias singhala, the Ceylon palmfly, is a butterfly in the family Nymphalidae. It was described by Frederic Moore in 1875. It is endemic to Sri Lanka in the Indomalayan realm.
