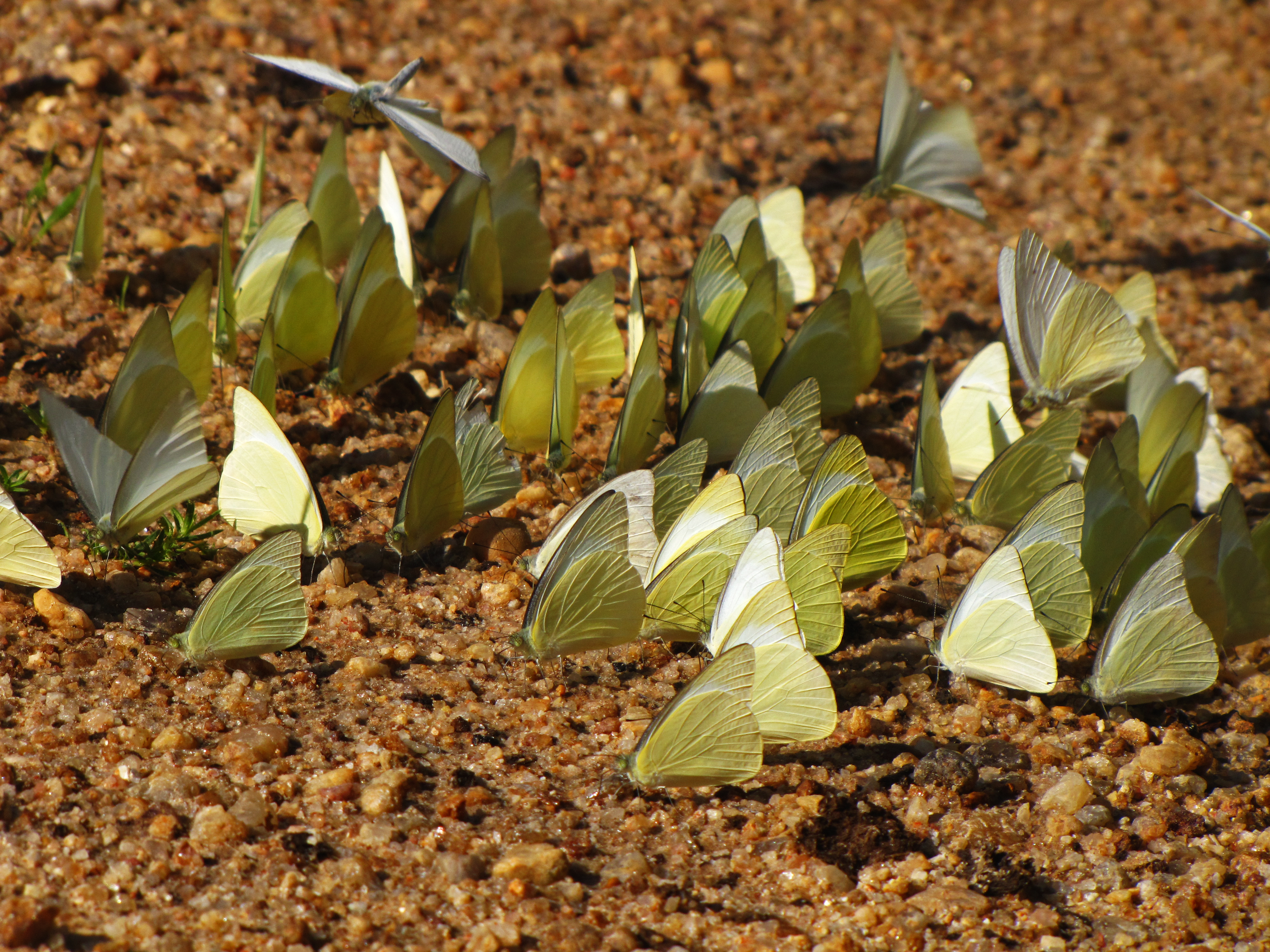
- Sri Lankan Lesser Albatros (Appias galene)

Scientific classification
- Kingdom: Animalia
- Phylum: Arthropoda
- Clade: Pancrustacea
- Class: Insecta
- Order: Lepidoptera
- Family: Pieridae
- Genus: Appias
- Species: A. galene

Binomial name
- Appias galene (C. Felder & R. Felder, 1865)

Synonyms
- Spindasis greeni Heron, 1896

= Appias galene =

Sri Lankan lesser albatross

Species of butterfly

Appias galene, the Sri Lankan lesser albatross, is a species of Pieridae. It is endemic to Sri Lanka.

== Description ==
Male has white dorsal surface with black patch towards margins of the forewing. This black patches are absent in dry season forms. Forewing apex and the hind wing lower surface are creamy, which become brighter in wet seasons. In female, there is a broad black band on margin of the dorsal surface of forewing. This band consists three white spots. On ventral surface, a broad black band found around the upper portion of the cell of forewing. Rarely in some forms, the ventral surface is yellow in color. Larval food plants are Drypetes sepiaria and Drypetes gardneri.

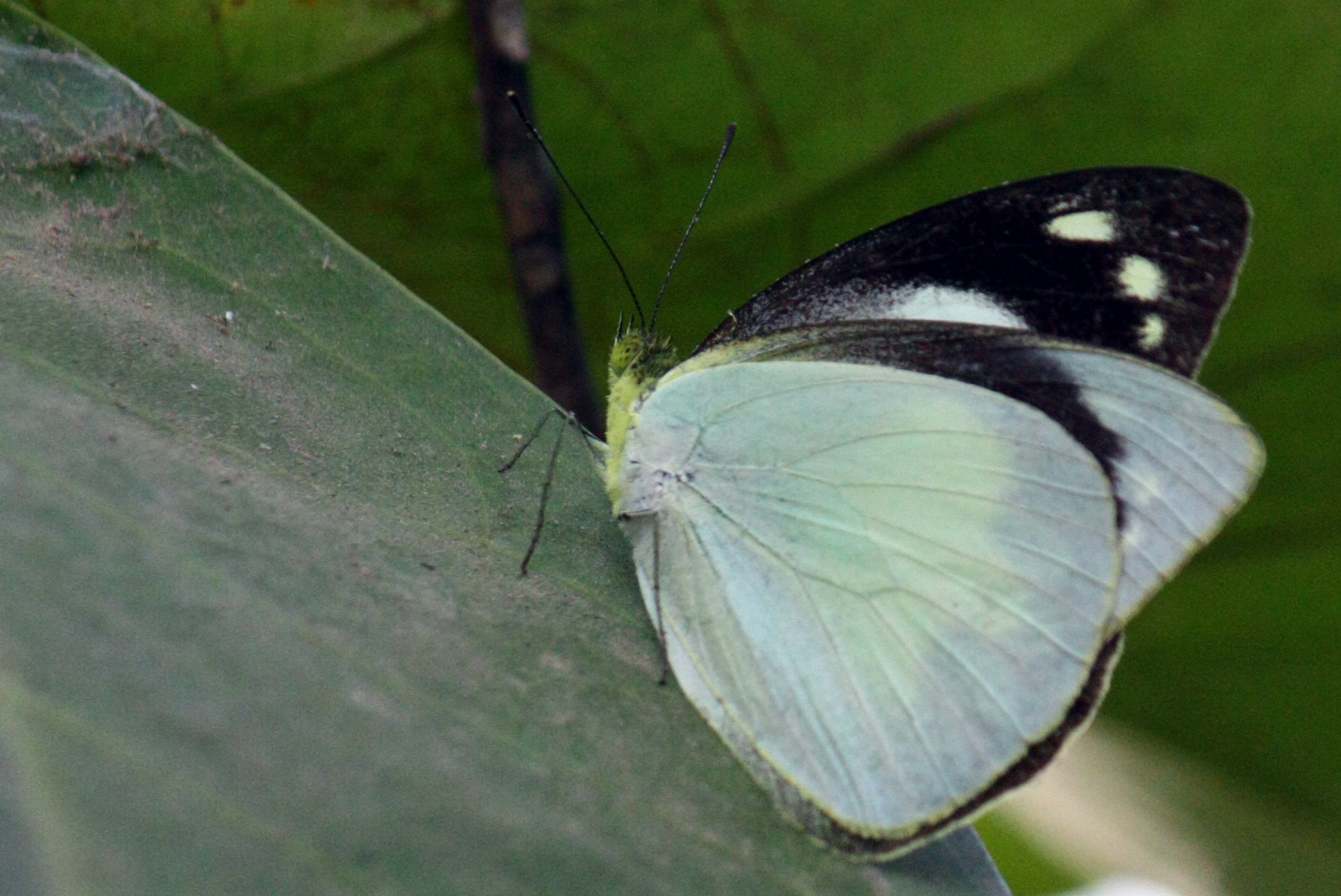
Appias galene found in Batticaloa, Sri Lanka
