= Cigaritis greeni =

Green's Silverline

Scientific classification
- Kingdom: Animalia
- Phylum: Arthropoda
- Clade: Pancrustacea
- Class: Insecta
- Order: Lepidoptera
- Family: Lycaenidae
- Genus: Cigaritis
- Species: C. greeni

Binomial name
- Cigaritis greeni (Heron, 1896)

Synonyms
- Spindasis greeni Heron, 1896

Species of butterfly

Cigaritis greeni, Green's silverline, is a species of lycaenid or blue butterfly. It is endemic to Sri Lanka.
