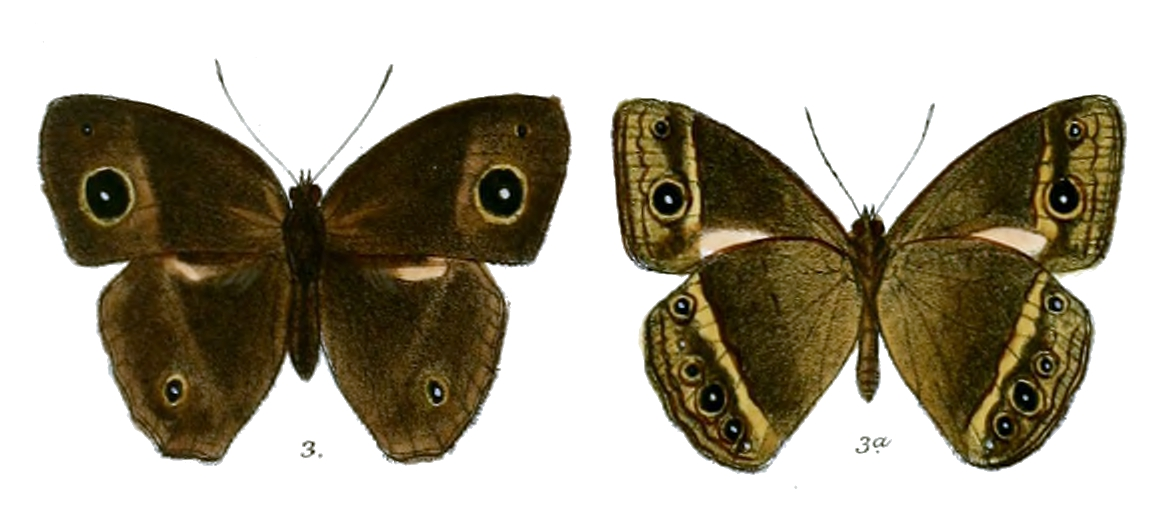

Scientific classification
- Kingdom: Animalia
- Phylum: Arthropoda
- Clade: Pancrustacea
- Class: Insecta
- Order: Lepidoptera
- Family: Nymphalidae
- Genus: Mycalesis
- Species: M. rama

Binomial name
- Mycalesis rama Moore, 1890-1892

= Mycalesis rama =

Cingalese bushbrown

Species of satyrine butterfly

Mycalesis rama, the Cingalese bushbrown, is a species of satyrine butterfly of family Nymphalidae. It is a very shy animal, distributed in bamboo forests. It is endemic to Sri Lanka.

Wingspan is about 56mm. Dorsal surface is dark brown with two eyespots at the sub marginal area. Lower eyespot is large, prominent and ringed with orange. Ventral surface is dull orange brown. Larval host plants include Ochlandra stridula and Bambusa species.
