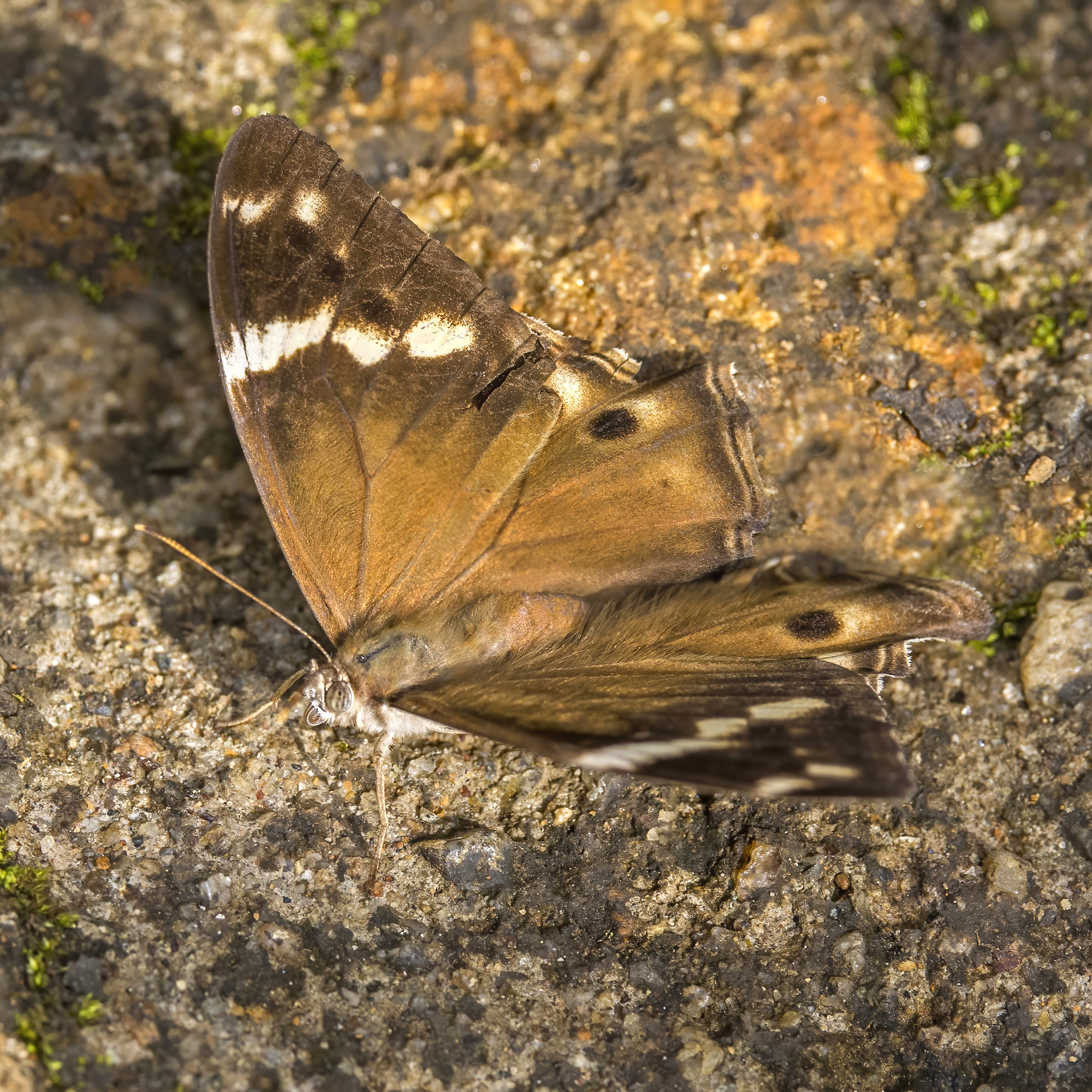
- Female, Sri Lanka

Scientific classification
- Domain: Eukaryota
- Kingdom: Animalia
- Phylum: Arthropoda
- Class: Insecta
- Order: Lepidoptera
- Family: Nymphalidae
- Genus: Lethe
- Species: L. drypetis

Binomial name
- Lethe drypetis (Hewitson, 1863)

= Lethe drypetis =

Species of butterfly

Lethe drypetis, the Tamil tree brown, is a species of Satyrinae butterfly found in South India and Sri Lanka.

== Description ==
Male: Upper-side very dark Vandyke brown; forewing uniform: hindwing with a postdiscal series of three or four blind black ocellar spots. Underside, brown; forewing below vein 2 and terminal margin paler, with a broad band across the cell, the wing medially and at apex suffused with lilac, bearing an incurved postdiscal series of five, blind black ocelli. Hindwing: sub basal and discal narrow transverse lilac bands, the former sinuous, the latter angulated on vein 4, and an arched postdiscal series of black fulvous-ringed ocelli, some with disintegrate centres; the wing medially suffused with lilac, the ocelli with lilacine lunules on both sides. Forewings and hindwings with slender lilacine subterminal and broader ochraceous terminal lines.

Female: Similar to male, with ground colour paler; a broad oblique white discal bar and two white preapical spots on the upper-side of the forewing; a large, rectangular black subterminal mark in interspaces and a white spot above and below it, on the upper-side of the hindwing. Underside similar to the underside in the male, all the markings more prominent, the lilac, ochraceous and brown shades paler; the broad discal bar on forewing, as on the upper-side, joined by a nearly vertical lilacine white band bearing the series of ocelli.

On the hindwing, a brown transverse discal band is very broadly produced between veins 4 and 5. Antennae, head, thorax and abdomen brown; antennae ochraceous at apex.

Wingspan 64–68mm.

Found in southern India and Sri Lanka.

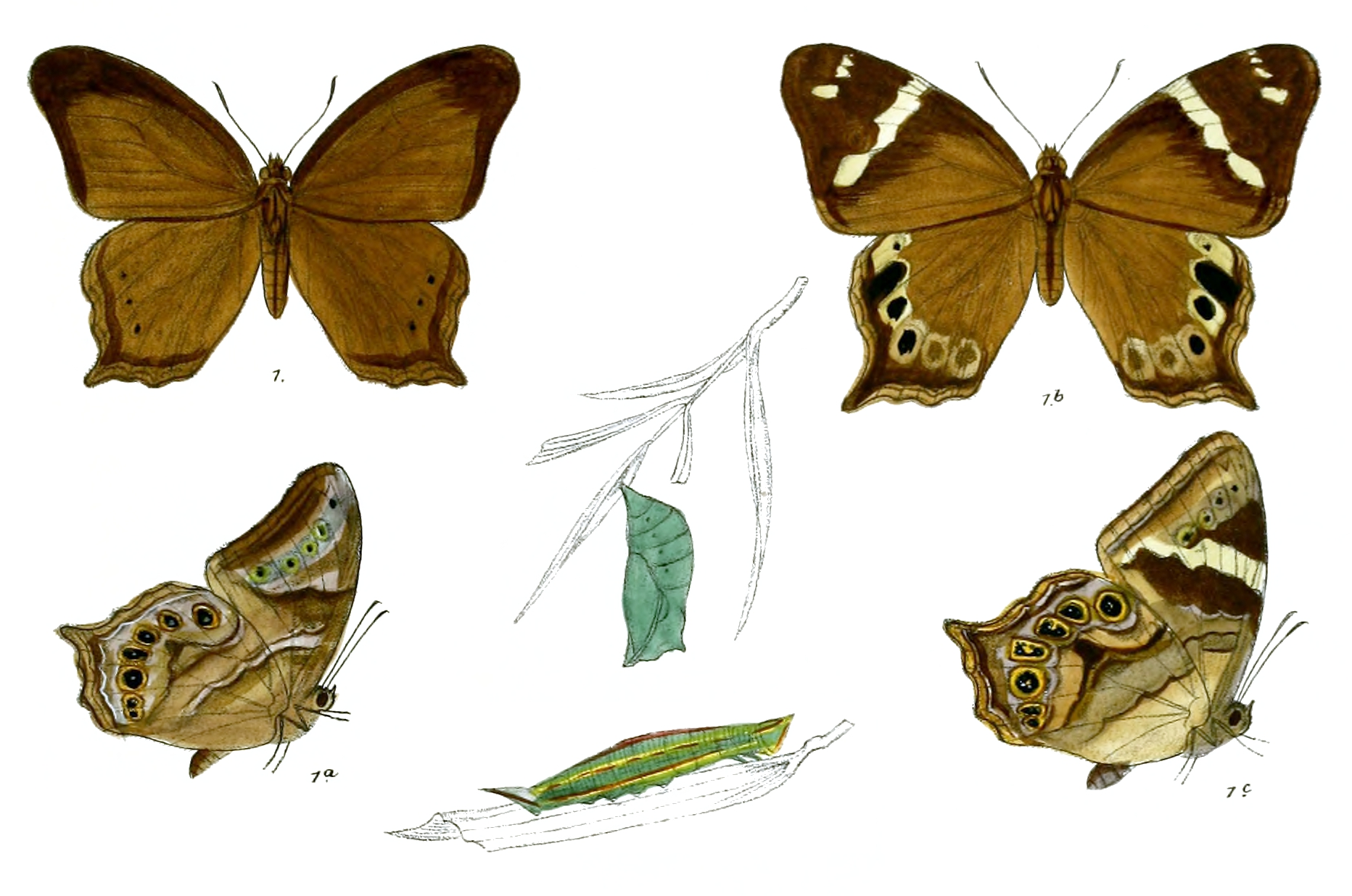
Female (left) and male (right) upper and underside pattern

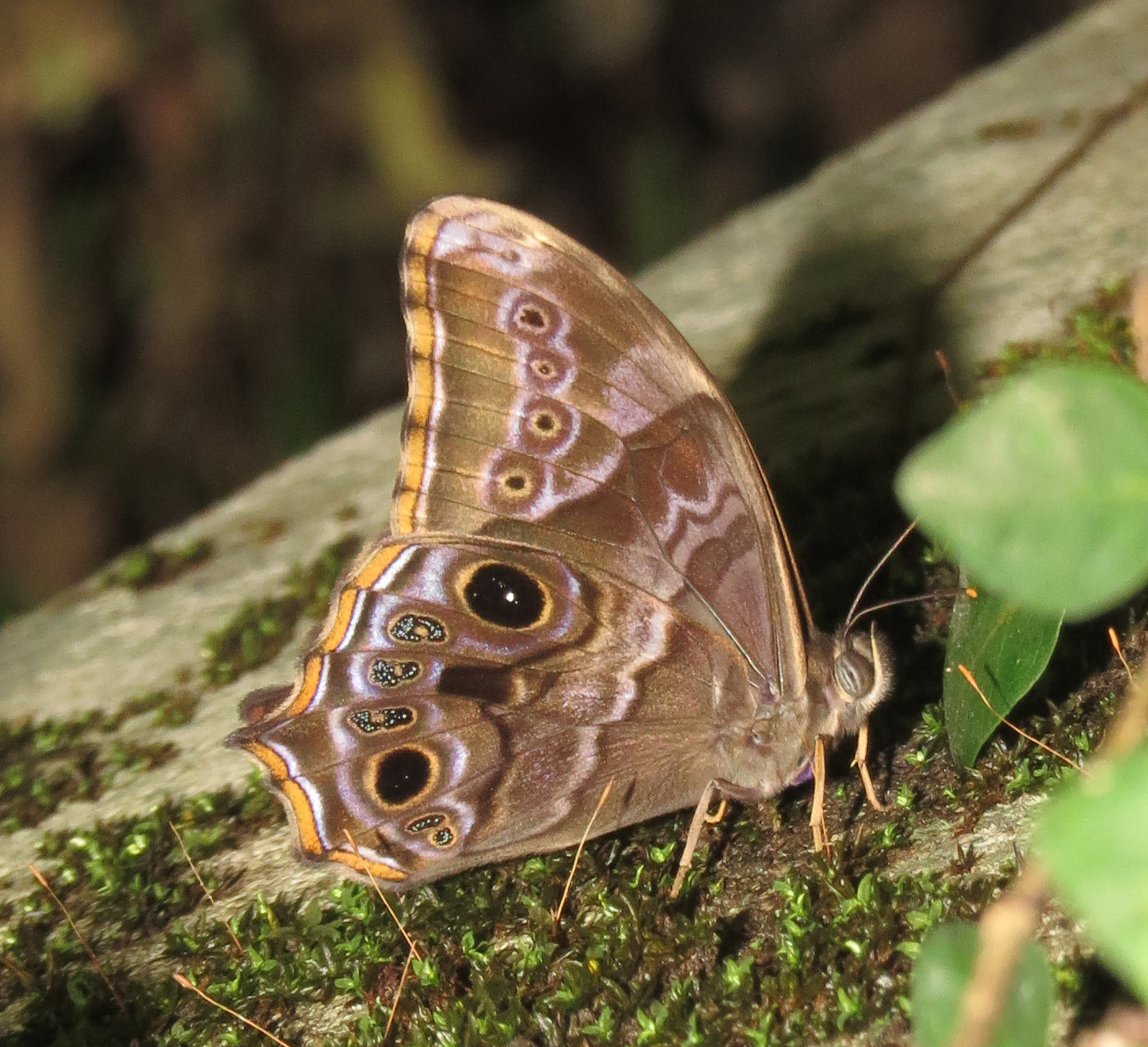
Male, Kerala, India

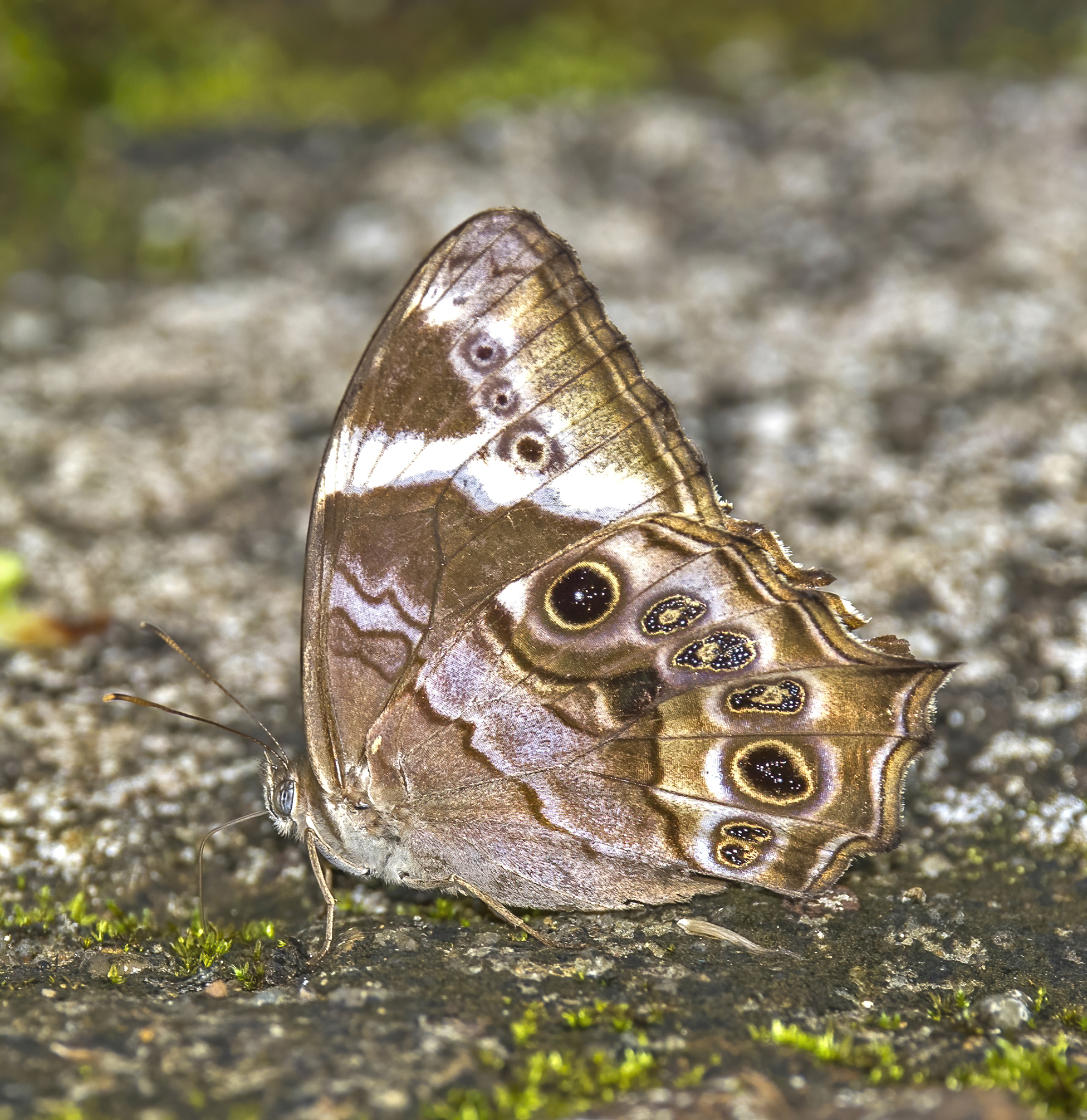
Female, Sri Lanka

== Life history ==
Larva. "Fusiform; head conical, the vertex pointed and projected forward, anal segment pointed and projected hind ward. Colour pale green, with paler transverse lines on each segment; a lateral and a sublateral pale-bordered reddish stripe extending the whole length, including the anal segment. Feeds on bamboo." (After Frederic Moore)

Pupa. "Suspended by the tail, broad and truncated anteriorly, abdominal segments dorsally convex, head and vertex both pointed; colour pale green." (After Moore)
