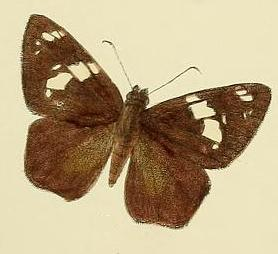

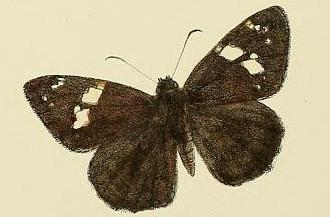

Scientific classification
- Kingdom: Animalia
- Phylum: Arthropoda
- Class: Insecta
- Order: Lepidoptera
- Family: Hesperiidae
- Genus: Celaenorrhinus
- Species: C. spilothyrus

Binomial name
- Celaenorrhinus spilothyrus (Felder, 1868)

Synonyms
- Eudamus spilothyrus Felder, 1868; Plesioneura spilothyrus; Eudamus infernus Felder, 1868

= Celaenorrhinus spilothyrus =

Sri Lanka black flat

Species of butterfly

Celaenorrhinus spilothyrus, commonly known as the Sri Lanka black flat, is a species of butterfly in the family Hesperiidae. It is found in India and Sri Lanka.
