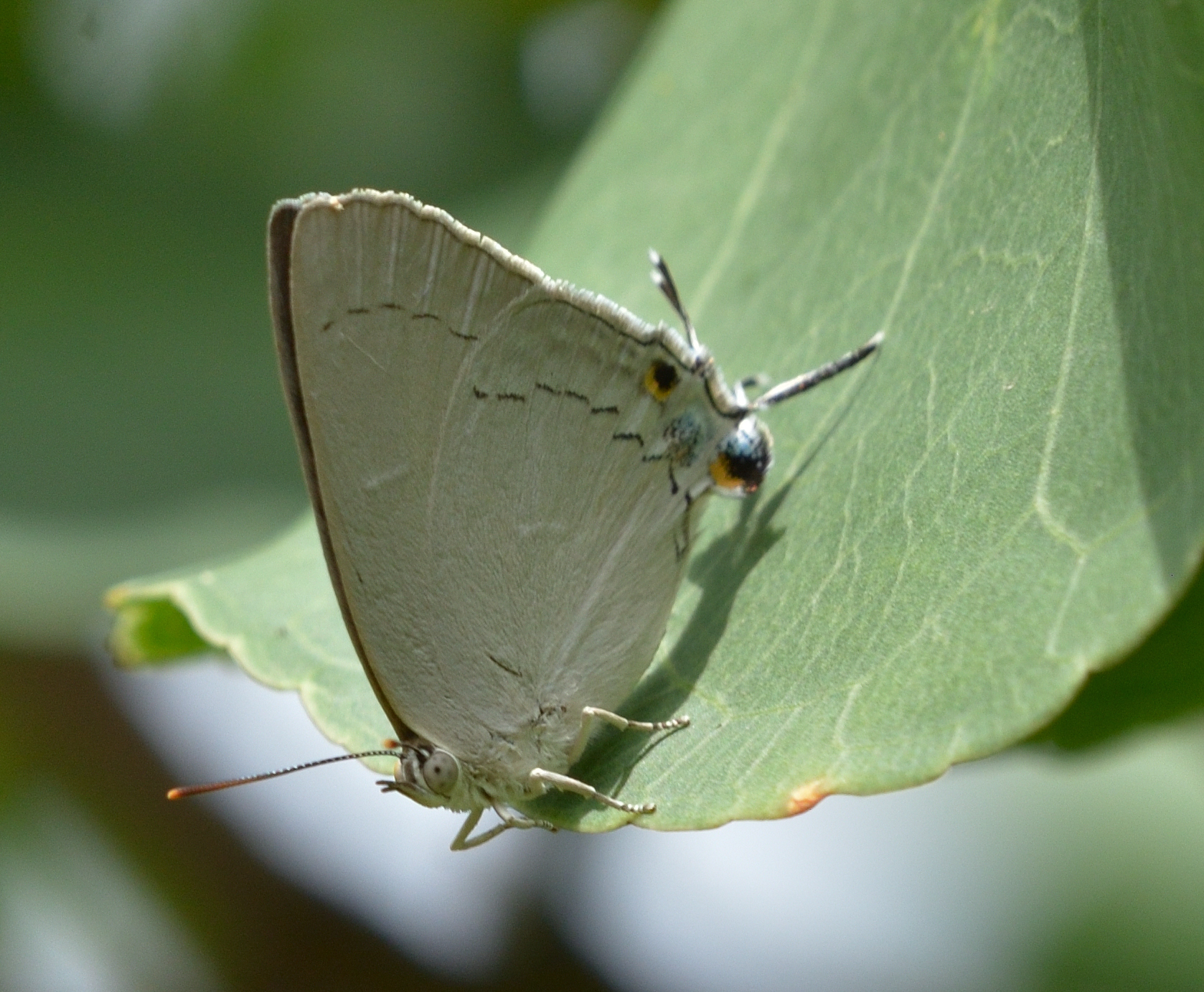

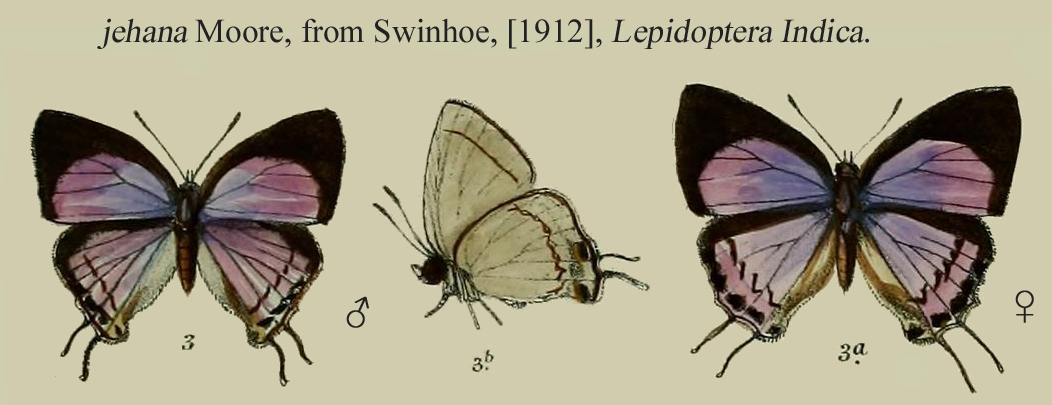

Scientific classification
- Kingdom: Animalia
- Phylum: Arthropoda
- Clade: Pancrustacea
- Class: Insecta
- Order: Lepidoptera
- Family: Lycaenidae
- Genus: Tajuria
- Species: T. jehana

Binomial name
- Tajuria jehana Moore, 1883

= Tajuria jehana =

Plains blue royal

Species of butterfly

Tajuria jehana, the plains blue royal, is a species of lycaenid or blue butterfly found in Asia.

== Description ==
Male. Upperside slaty-blue. Forewing with moderately broad costal and outer marginal blackish bands, gradually broadening on the costa from the base to the apex and narrowing down the outer margin to the hinder angle. Hindwing with a broad costal blackish band, the immediate costal space narrowly pale, a narrow blackish, macular outer marginal band, ending in a black spot in each of the last two interspaces and another on the anal lobe, with some small pale bluish-white marks above them, a discal line of black lunules, rather close to the margin, a terminal black line with bluish-white iuuer thread from the anal lobe, becoming obsolete before reaching the apex of the wing; tails black, tipped with white. Cilia of forewing white, with a blackish base, of the hindwing white, with black spots at the vein ends. Underside creamy-greyish-white. Forewing with a very fine discal lunular brown line, reaching neither the costa nor the hinder margin, rather close to the outer margin, generally very indistinct. Hindwing with a similar discal line, but somewhat more distinct, sinuous hindwards where it curves to the abdominal margin a little above the anal angle; both wings with a double sub-marginal series of pale lunular marks, indistinct on the hindwing, very faintly indicated on the forewing, a rather large black anal spot, another in the first interspace, both capped with dull orange-red, the space between them containing some black and blue scales. Antennae black, ringed with white, club with a red tip; frons white, with a black middle stripe; eyes ringed with white, a white collar; body above and below concolorous with the wings. Female. Upperside duller in colour than the male and somewhat paler, the marginal bands broader, the discal band on the hindwing more pronounced, and on the forewing there is often a small whitish space outside the end of the cell. Underside as in the male.

— Charles Swinhoe, Lepidoptera Indica. Vol. IX
