= C17H26O4 =

The molecular formula C_{17}H_{26}O_{4} (molar mass 294.38 g/mol, exact mass: 294.1831 u) may refer to:

- Embelin (2,5-dihydroxy-3-undecyl-1,4-benzoquinone)
- Gingerol
- Cineromycin B
