= Embelia schimperi =

Scientific classification
- Kingdom: Plantae
- Clade: Tracheophytes
- Clade: Angiosperms
- Clade: Eudicots
- Clade: Asterids
- Order: Ericales
- Family: Primulaceae
- Genus: Embelia
- Species: E. schimperi

Binomial name
- Embelia schimperi Vatke

Species of flowering plants

Embelia schimperi is a shrubby climber or small tree within the family Primulaceae.

== Description ==
Embelia schimperi is a shrub or small tree that is capable of reaching 6 m (20 ft) in height with a red to brownish bark that is usually smooth. Branches are lenticellate and the stems are smooth and free of hair. Leaves are oblong to ovate in outline; leaflets can reach up to 12 cm (4.7 in) in length and 5 cm (2.0 in) in width, they tend to be cuneate or obtuse at the base and rounded or obtuse at the apex. Inflorescence is arranged in axillary racemes and are dense with up to 30 flowers bunched together. The flowers are cream colored, the petals are up to 3 mm (0.12 in) long and black dotted. Fruit is 1 seeded, reddish in color and drupe like with globose in shape.

== Chemistry ==
A type of benzoquinone, Embelin, 2,5-dihydroxy-3-undecyl- 1,4-benzoquinone has been isolated from dry fruits of Embelia schimperi.

== Uses ==
Among the Maasai people, dry fruit and root extracts of the species is used as an antihelmintic, specifically against the tapeworm, Taenia saginata.
