= Rapanone =

Names
- IUPAC name 2,5-Dihydroxy-3-tridecylcyclohexa-2,5-diene-1,4-dione
- Other names: 2,5-dihydroxy-3-tridecyl-1,4-benzoquinone

Identifiers
| CAS Number | 573-40-0 |
| 3D model (JSmol) | Interactive image |
| ChEBI | CHEBI:8779 |
| ChEMBL | ChEMBL462801 |
| ChemSpider | 90945 |
| ECHA InfoCard | 100.200.721 |
| EC Number | 675-435-8 |
| KEGG | C10399 |
| PubChem CID | 100659 |
| UNII | SH52PPU72X |
| CompTox Dashboard (EPA) | DTXSID80205915 |
- InChI: InChI=1S/C19H30O4/c1-2-3-4-5-6-7-8-9-10-11-12-13-15-18(22)16(20)14-17(21)19(15)23/h14,20,23H,2-13H2,1H3 Key: AMKNOBHCKRZHIO-UHFFFAOYSA-N
- SMILES: CCCCCCCCCCCCCC1=C(C(=O)C=C(C1=O)O)O

Properties
| Chemical formula | C_{19}H_{30}O_{4} |
| Molar mass | 322.445 g·mol^{−1} |
| Melting point | 141 to 142 °C (286 to 288 °F; 414 to 415 K) |

Hazards
- GHS labelling
| Pictograms | (GHS07: Exclamation mark) |
| Signal word | Warning |
| Hazard statements | H315, H319, H335 |
| Precautionary statements | P261, P264, P264+P265, P271, P280, P302+P352, P304+P340, P305+P351+P338, P319, P321, P332+P317, P337+P317, P362+P364, P403+P233, P405, P501 |

Related compounds
| Related compounds | Grevillol; Embelin |
- Except where otherwise noted, data are given for materials in their standard state (at 25 °C [77 °F], 100 kPa). Infobox references

Rapanone is an organic compound and natural product. It is a tridecyl side chain derivative of 2,5-dihydroxy-1,4-benzoquinone with the chemical formula C_{19}H_{30}O_{4}.

== Occurrence ==
It occurs in various plant species including Aconitum lamarckii, Aegiceras corniculatum, Embelia ribes, Heliotropium indicum, and several Ardisia species. It also occurs in fungi including Irpex lacteus.

== Synthesis ==
Rapanone can be synthesized by the alkylation of 2,5-dihydroxy-1,4-benzoquinone with the peroxide of myristic acid.

== Pharmacology ==
Rapanone derivatives and related quinonoids are being researched for their potential anticancer properties, although their mechanism is unclear. It is also classified as an antiparasitic agent. Some studies claim iron chelating and free radical scavenging properties in rapanone and its derivatives.
