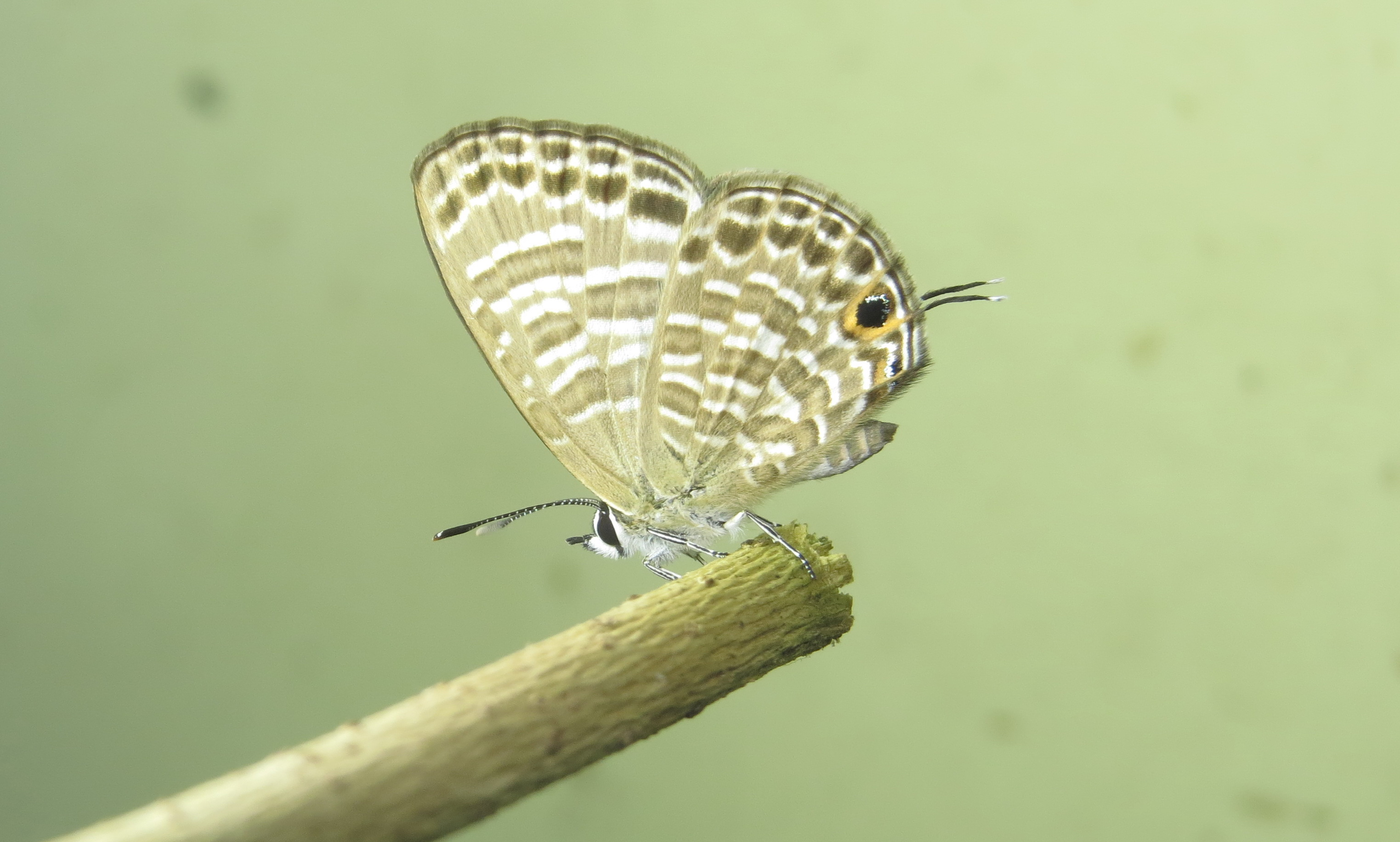

Scientific classification
- Domain: Eukaryota
- Kingdom: Animalia
- Phylum: Arthropoda
- Class: Insecta
- Order: Lepidoptera
- Family: Lycaenidae
- Genus: Nacaduba
- Species: N. kurava

Binomial name
- Nacaduba kurava (Moore, 1857)

= Nacaduba kurava =

Transparent six-line blue

Species of butterfly

Nacaduba kurava, the transparent six-line blue, is a species of butterfly in the family Lycaenidae found in Asia and Australia. The species was first described by Frederic Moore in 1857.

== Description ==
Male upperside: pale dull violet with in certain lights a frosted silvery sheen; bases of wings suffused slightly with blue. Forewing: a slender anteciliary dark brown line. Hindwing: costa broadly paler; dorsum brownish; in most specimens the subterminal spots in interspaces 1 and 2 show through by transparency from the underside, in a few these spots are marked by actual scaling; an anteciliary dark brown line as in the forewing. Underside: brown. Forewing: transversely traversed by three pairs of white strigae, the innermost pair slightly curved, from subcostal vein to vein 1 across the middle of the cell; the inner striga of the medial pair complete, crosses on the inner side of the discocellulars from subcostal vein to vein 1, the outer striga beyond the discocellulars from vein 7 to vein 1, interrupted in interspace 5; the outer pair of strigae are discal and cross -from vein 7 to vein 3, the inner striga of the pair impinging at vein 3 on the outer striga of the medial pair; these are followed by an inner and an outer subterminal slender lunular line, a terminal series of slender transversely linear spots edged outwardly by a very slender white, and an anteciliary dark brown line. Hindwing: crossed by six or seven irregular, more or less broken, sublunular, white striations; terminal markings similar to those on the forewing; interspace 1 with a minute, interspace 2 with a much larger round jet-black spot, both spots crowned inwardly with ochraceous orange and touched outwardly with glittering metallic blue scales. Antennae black, the shafts obscurely speckled with white on the sides; head, thorax and abdomen purplish brown; beneath: the palpi fringed with black hairs, the thorax bluish white, abdomen white.

Female upperside, forewing: costa above the cell, apex very broadly and a terminal edging that occupies about one-third of the length of the wing jet-black, this colour on the costa widened outwards; the remainder of the wing white shaded with dusky greyish which in certain lights has a beautiful metallic blue iridescence; on the inner side of the terminal edging is a transverse, very ill-defined, diffuse dusky band, and enclosed between it and the black edging three somewhat prominent spots of the white ground colour. Hindwing: costal margin above a longitudinal line through the middle of the cell dusky black; posterior portion of the wing dusky bluish, veins prominently black; a comparatively well-defined transverse postdiscal series of black lunules edged inwardly and outwardly by similar series of white lunules, followed by a subterminal series of black spots with an outer edging of white and an anteciliary jet-black line; the subterminal spots decrease in size anteriorly, those in interspaces 2 and 3 the largest, the two spots in interspace 1 minute and geminate (paired); tail black tipped with white. Underside: similar to that of the male but the ground colour grey with a slight tint of brown, the transverse white strigae much broader, somewhat diffuse; on the forewing the band formed by the medial pair of strigae much more broken than in the male the posterior portion below vein 3 shifted well outwards; on the hindwing the sub-terminal black spot in interspace 2 comparatively very large and prominent. Antenna as in the male; head, thorax and abdomen brown; beneath: the palpi, thorax and abdomen as in the male.

== Distribution ==
- Sikkim; Bhutan; southern India: the Nilgiri and Shevaroy Hills; Sri Lanka; Assam; Cachar; Myanmar; Tenasserim; the Nicobars; extending to the Malay Peninsula and Java.
- Hong Kong

== Larva ==
"Feeds on Embelia tsjeriam-cottam ..., the back elevated and the segments most distinctly defined; the anal segment is flattened; the back forms a distinct ridge, the colour is green but there is a purple line along the ridge of the back; the other segments are also edged with the same colour. The head is small, amber coloured, with a darker border." (Davidson, Bell & Aitken)

== Pupa ==
"Short and stout, constricted slightly between the thorax and abdomen and has slight traces of a ridge along the back. In colour it is a dingy greenish-brown powdered with black. There is an interrupted dark hand along the middle of the hack and also spots of blackish on the abdominal segments and just beyond the wing-covers and the sides of the thorax. It is smooth and only fastened at the tail parallel with the leaf to which it is attached." (Davidson, Bell & Aitken)
