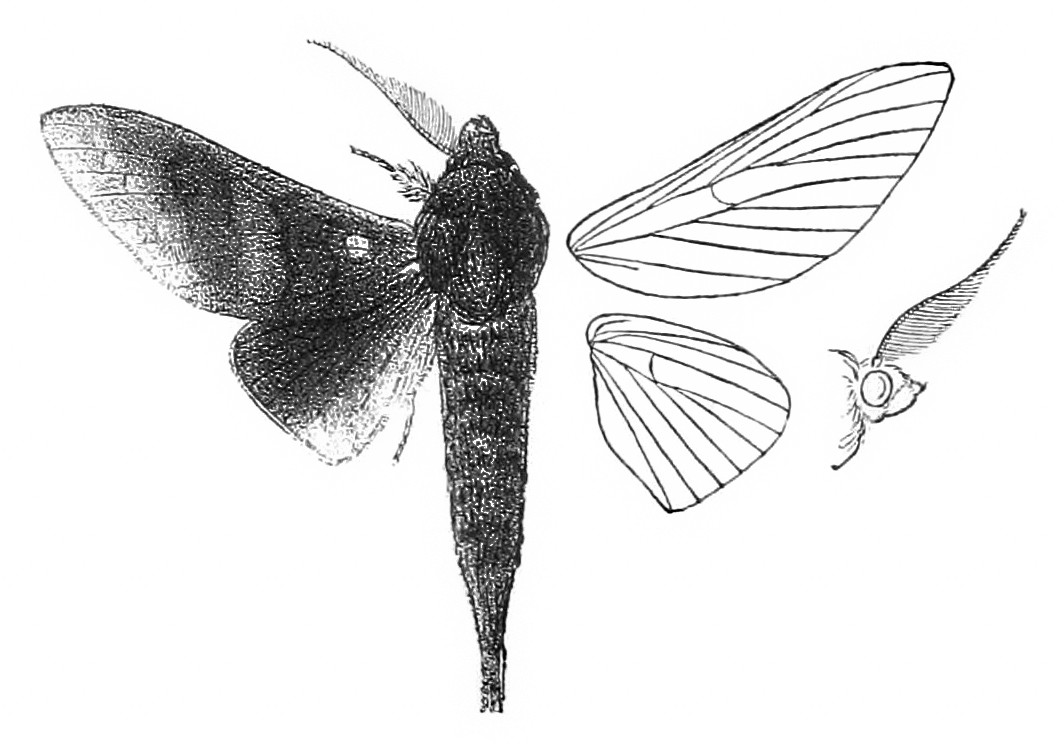

Scientific classification
- Kingdom: Animalia
- Phylum: Arthropoda
- Class: Insecta
- Order: Lepidoptera
- Family: Lasiocampidae
- Genus: Suana
- Species: S. concolor

Binomial name
- Suana concolor Walker, 1855

Synonyms
- Lebeda concolor Walker, 1855; Lebeda bimaculata Walker, 1855; Suana ampla Walker, 1855; Suana cervina Moore, 1879

= Suana concolor =

Species of moth

Suana concolor is a moth of the family Lasiocampidae first described by Francis Walker in 1855. It is found in India and Sri Lanka, to South China, Java, Borneo and the Philippines.

== Biology ==
The adult is a sphinx-like moth with dark reddish-brown wings and a lighter margin. One or two yellowish spots are found on the forewings. The female lays off-white to light brown eggs which are ellipsoidal. It has a single lateral ovoid brown spot. The caterpillar has a black head in first instars. Thoracic segments white and black transversely banded. Caterpillars hairy with downward directed tufts. Larval development usually lasts 60–80 days for the males and 85–100 days for the females. Pupa elongate bean shaped. It is dark brown to black to the tip of abdomen, with a shining cover.

Caterpillars feed on a diverse range of plants such as Careya, Ceiba, Canarium, Shorea, Castanea, Cinnamomum, Litsea, Persea, Acacia, Albizia, Cassia, Gossypium, Hibiscus, Embelia, Eucalyptus, Psidium, Syzygium, Citrus, Sonneratia, Theobroma, Camellia, Schima, and Tectona species.
