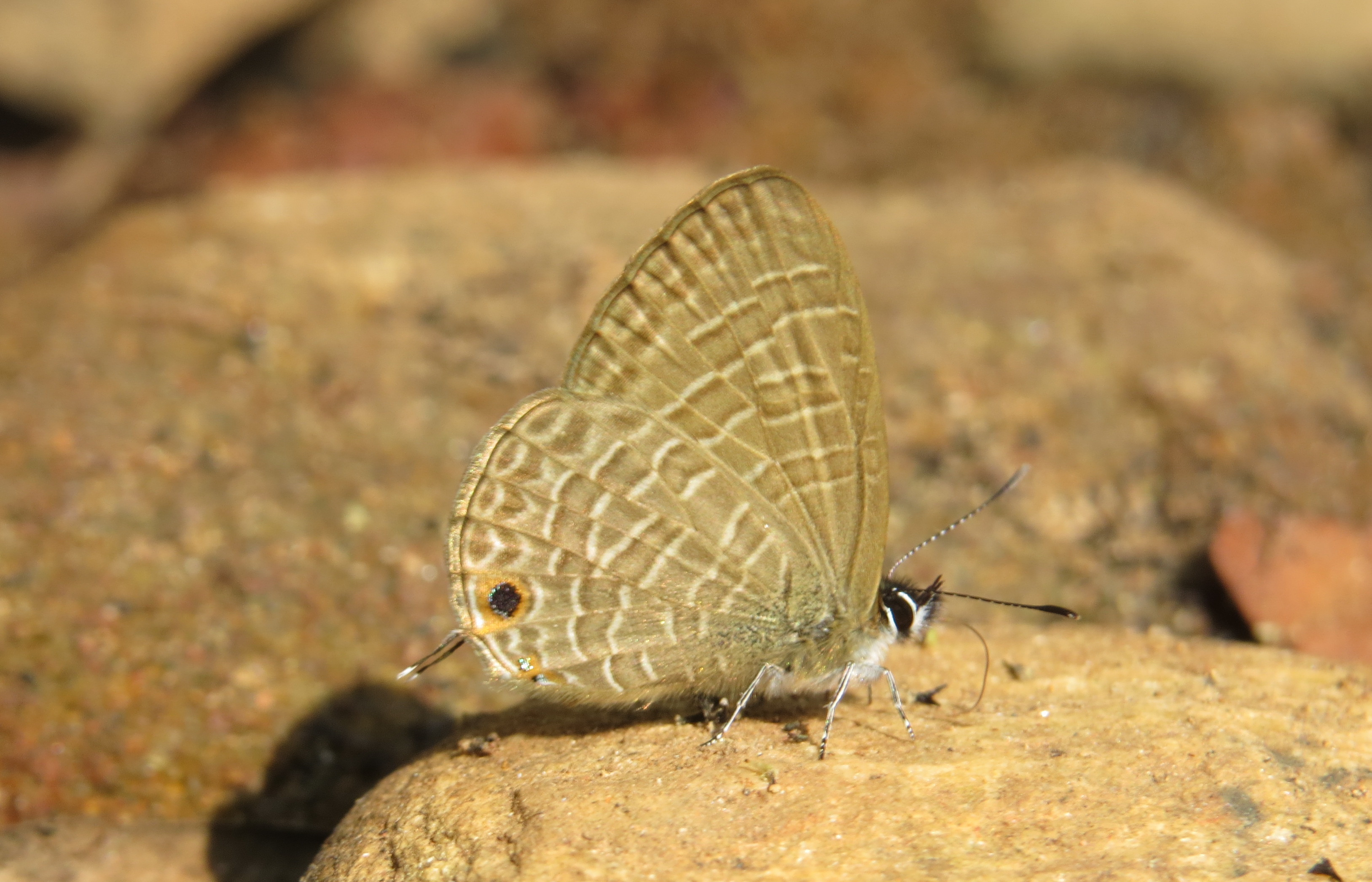
- Nacaduba beroe gythion

Scientific classification
- Kingdom: Animalia
- Phylum: Arthropoda
- Class: Insecta
- Order: Lepidoptera
- Family: Lycaenidae
- Genus: Nacaduba
- Species: N. beroe

Binomial name
- Nacaduba beroe (C. Felder & R. Felder, 1865)

= Nacaduba beroe =

Opaque six-line blue

Species of butterfly

Nacaduba beroe, the opaque six-line blue, is a lycaenid butterfly found in South and Southeast Asia. The species was first described by Cajetan Felder and Rudolf Felder in 1865. In beroe Fldr. The blackish-brown marginal spots beneath are rather small, proximally intensely bordered with white; the yellow halo of the subanal eyespot is continued yet in the direction of the apex of the hindwing.

Life cycle

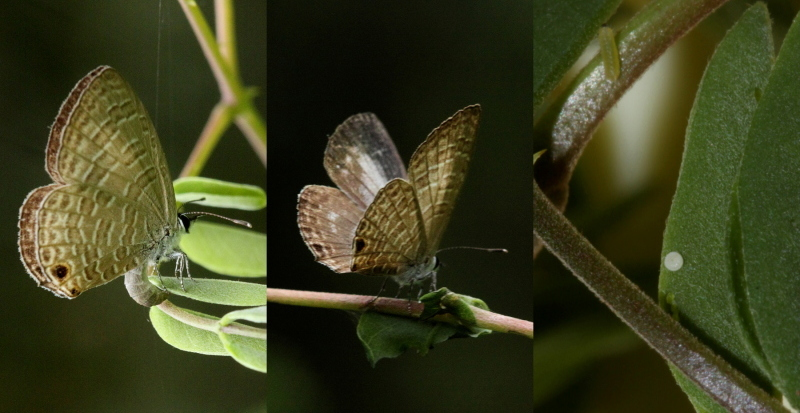
Egg laying

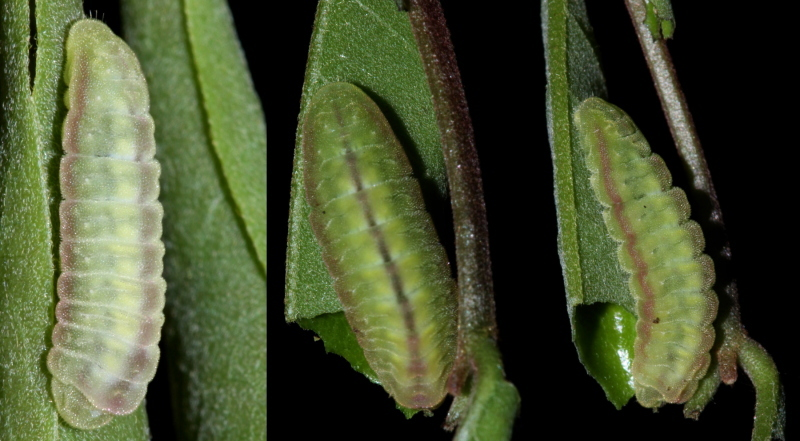
Larvae

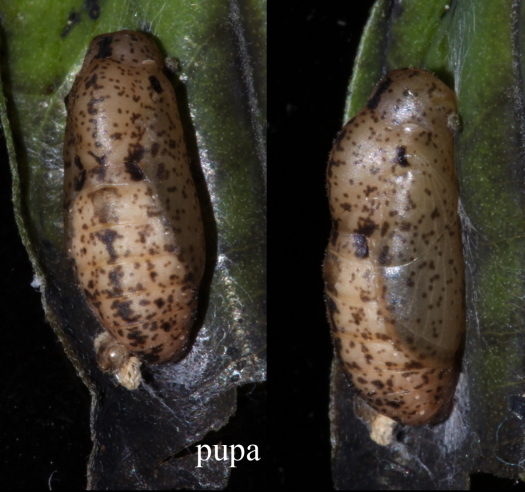
Pupae

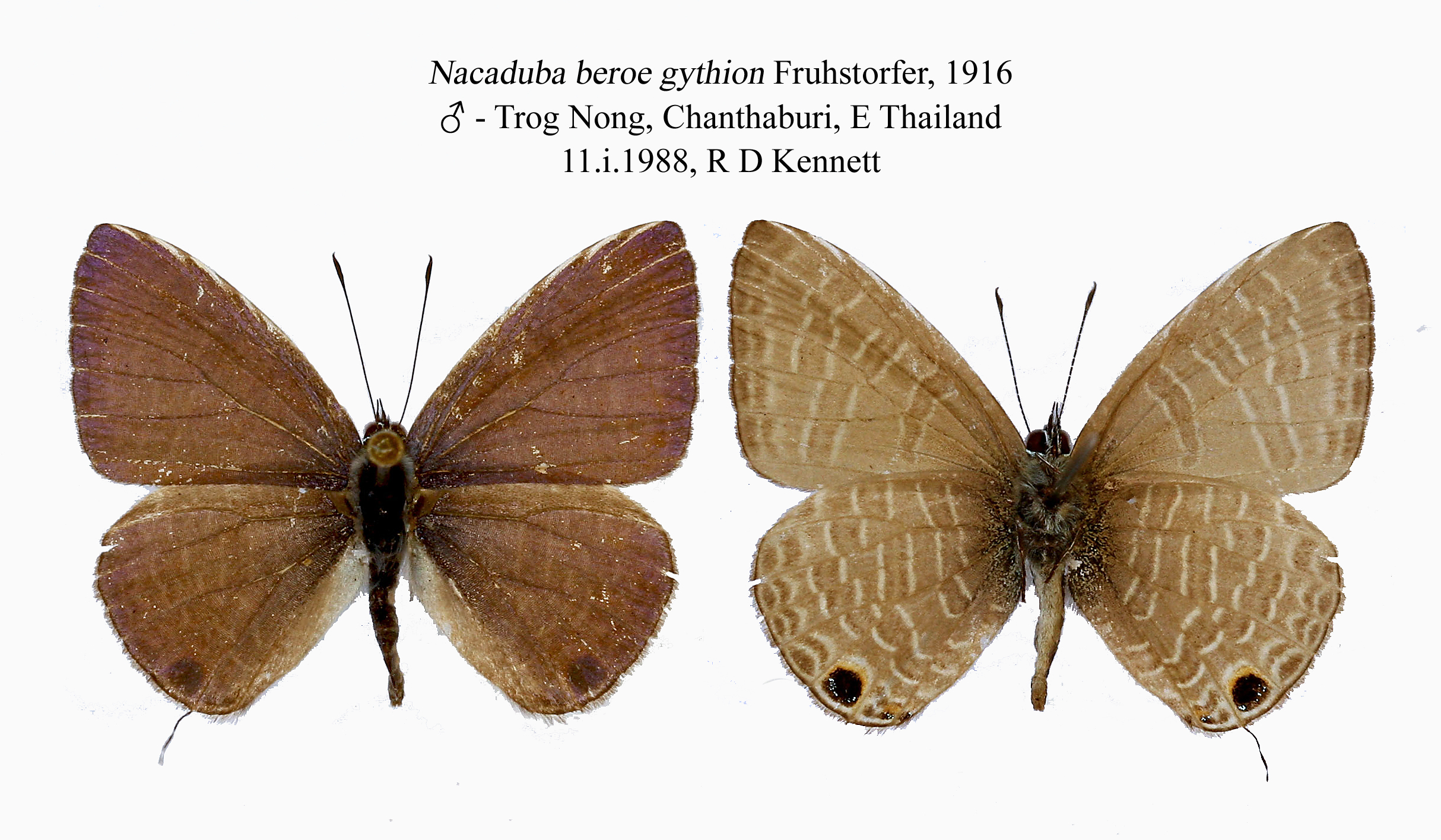
imago
