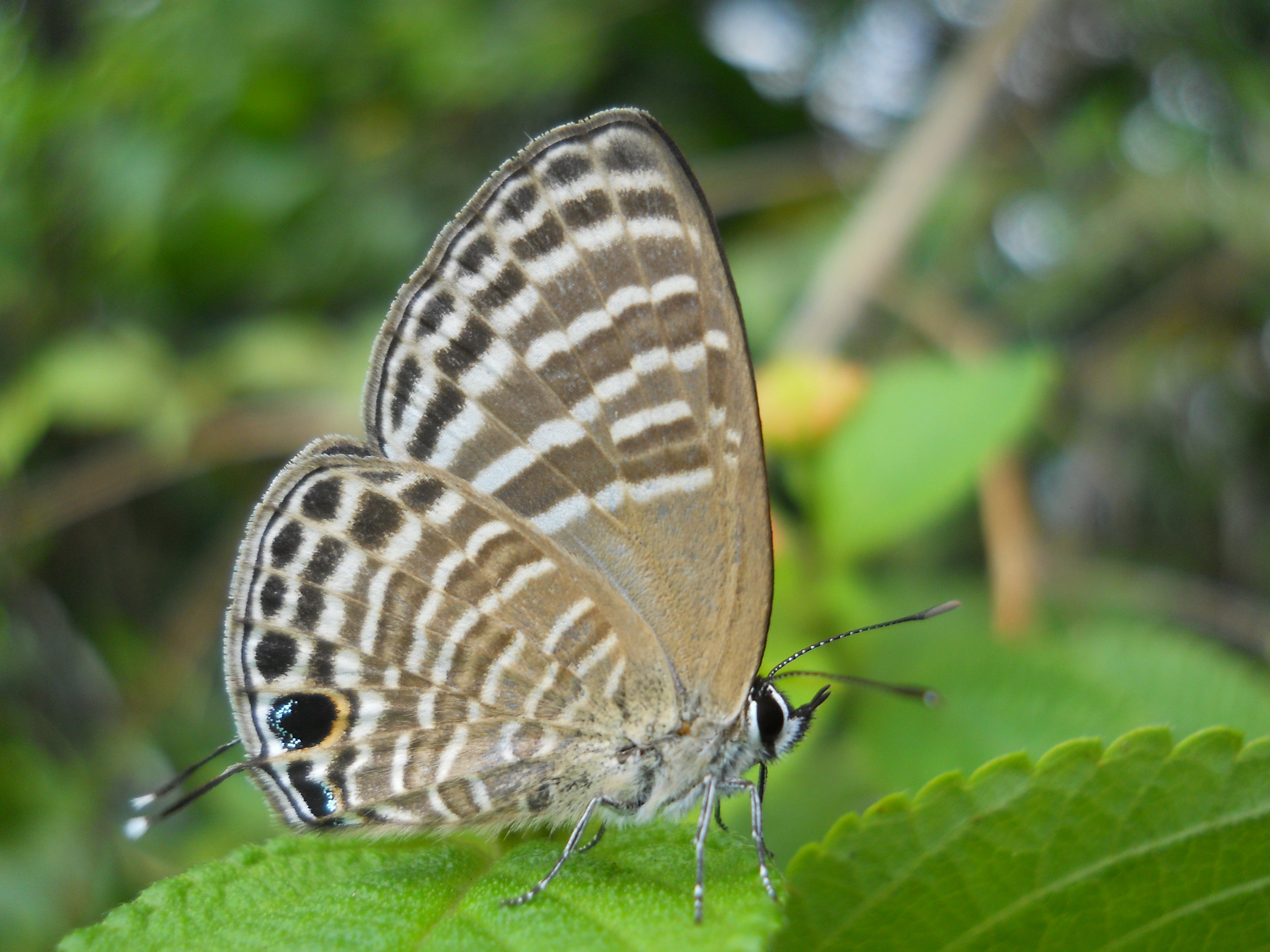

Scientific classification
- Domain: Eukaryota
- Kingdom: Animalia
- Phylum: Arthropoda
- Class: Insecta
- Order: Lepidoptera
- Family: Lycaenidae
- Genus: Nacaduba
- Species: N. angusta

Binomial name
- Nacaduba angusta (H. Druce, 1873)

= Nacaduba angusta =

White lineblue

Species of butterfly

Nacaduba angusta, the white lineblue, is a lycaenid butterfly found in South Asia. The species was first described by Herbert Druce in 1873.

== Description ==
Male upperside: purple with a frosted silvery-blue sheen very much as in N. macrophthalma. Forewing: a slender black anteciliary line. Hindwing: costal and dorsal margins somewhat broadly dull brown, an anteciliary black line as on the forewing; the subterminal black spots in interspaces 1 and 2 of the underside apparent in most specimens by transparency. Underside: ground colour and markings similar to those of N. macrophthalma but far more slender and more neatly defined. Antennae, head, thorax and abdomen as in N. macrophthalma.

Female upperside forewing: costa broadly, apex and termen still more broadly brown; a narrow edging of pale brown along the dorsal margin; rest of the wing grey, shot with iridescent blue in certain lights. Hindwing: pale brown, much paler than the brown on the forewing; base very obscurely shot with iridescent blue; costal and dorsal margins brownish white; a transverse subterminal series of black spots edged inwardly and outwardly with slender white lines, two minute spots in interspace 1 geminate (paired), that in interspace 2 large, these three crowned inwardly beyond the white edging with an additional dusky spot. Underside: very similar to that of the male, ground colour paler, transverse white strigae broader. Both male and female have the basal area of the forewing within the transverse white strigae lining the inner side of the discocellulars immaculate, as in N. macrophthalma and N. kerriana.

== Distribution ==
Sikkim; Bhutan; Assam; Cachar; Myanmar; Tenasserim; the Andamans. Described originally from Java.

Presently the butterfly is thought to range in South Asia from Karens to southern Myanmar.

As per Markku Savela, the butterfly ranges, in addition, from northern Thailand, Laos, Vietnam, Singapore, Peninsular Malaysia, Borneo, Sumatra, Java, Nias, Bonggaw, Sulawesi, the southern Philippines, Sanghie, and, possibly Sulu Islands.

== Status ==
Rare in Myanmar.

== See also ==
- List of butterflies of India (Lycaenidae)
