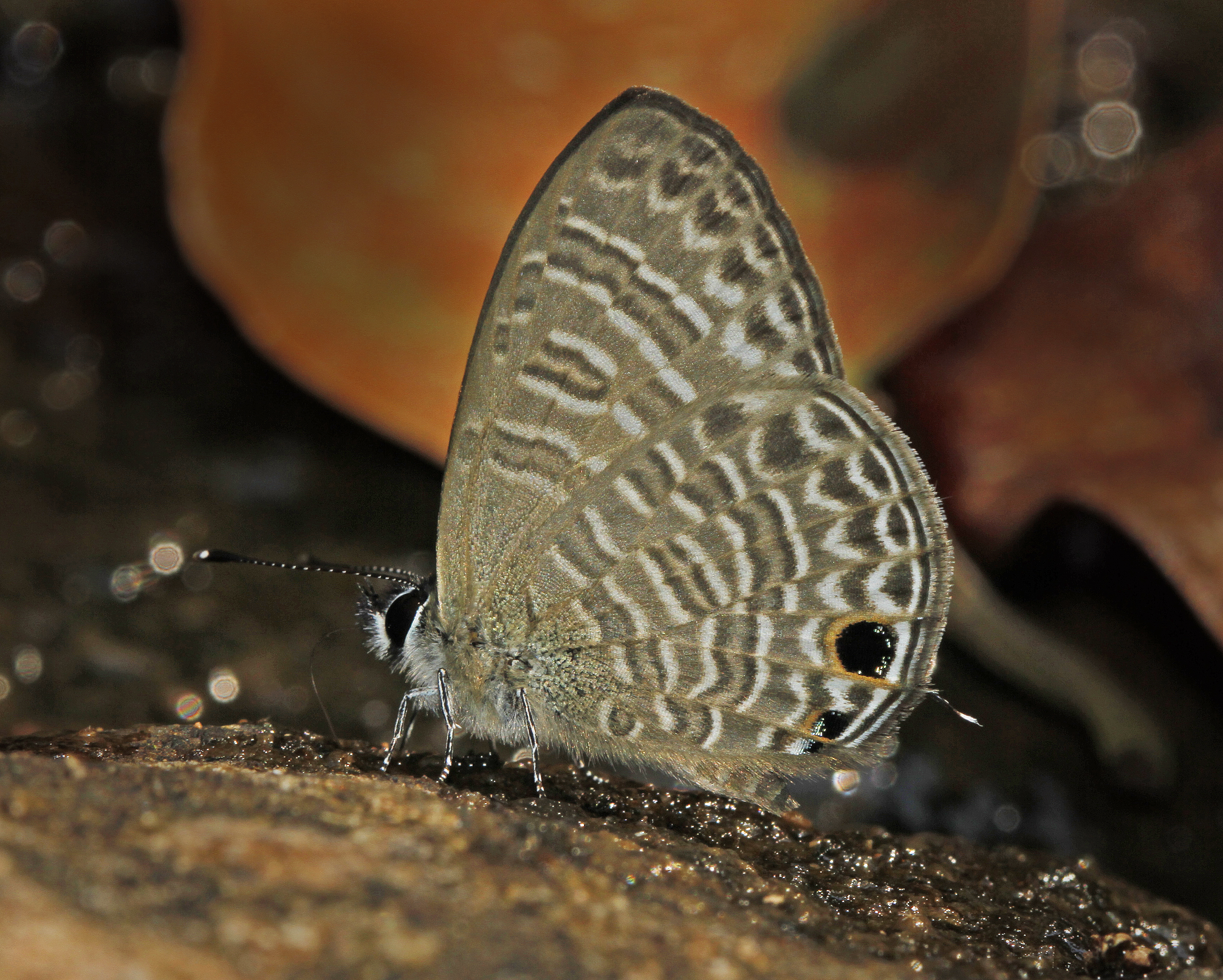
- Subspecies evansi in Sri Lanka

Scientific classification
- Kingdom: Animalia
- Phylum: Arthropoda
- Clade: Pancrustacea
- Class: Insecta
- Order: Lepidoptera
- Family: Lycaenidae
- Genus: Nacaduba
- Species: N. calauria

Binomial name
- Nacaduba calauria (C. Felder, 1860)

= Nacaduba calauria =

Dark Ceylon six-lineblue

Species of butterfly

Nacaduba calauria, the dark Ceylon six-lineblue, is a species of lycaenid butterfly found in Indomalayan realm. and New Guinea.

== Subspecies ==
- N. c. calauria New Guinea Sula, Maluku New Britain
- N. c. malayica Corbet, 1938 Peninsular Malaya, Singapore, Sumatra, Borneo
- N. c. cypria Toxopeus, 1929 Java
- N. c. evansi Toxopeus, 1927 Ceylon
