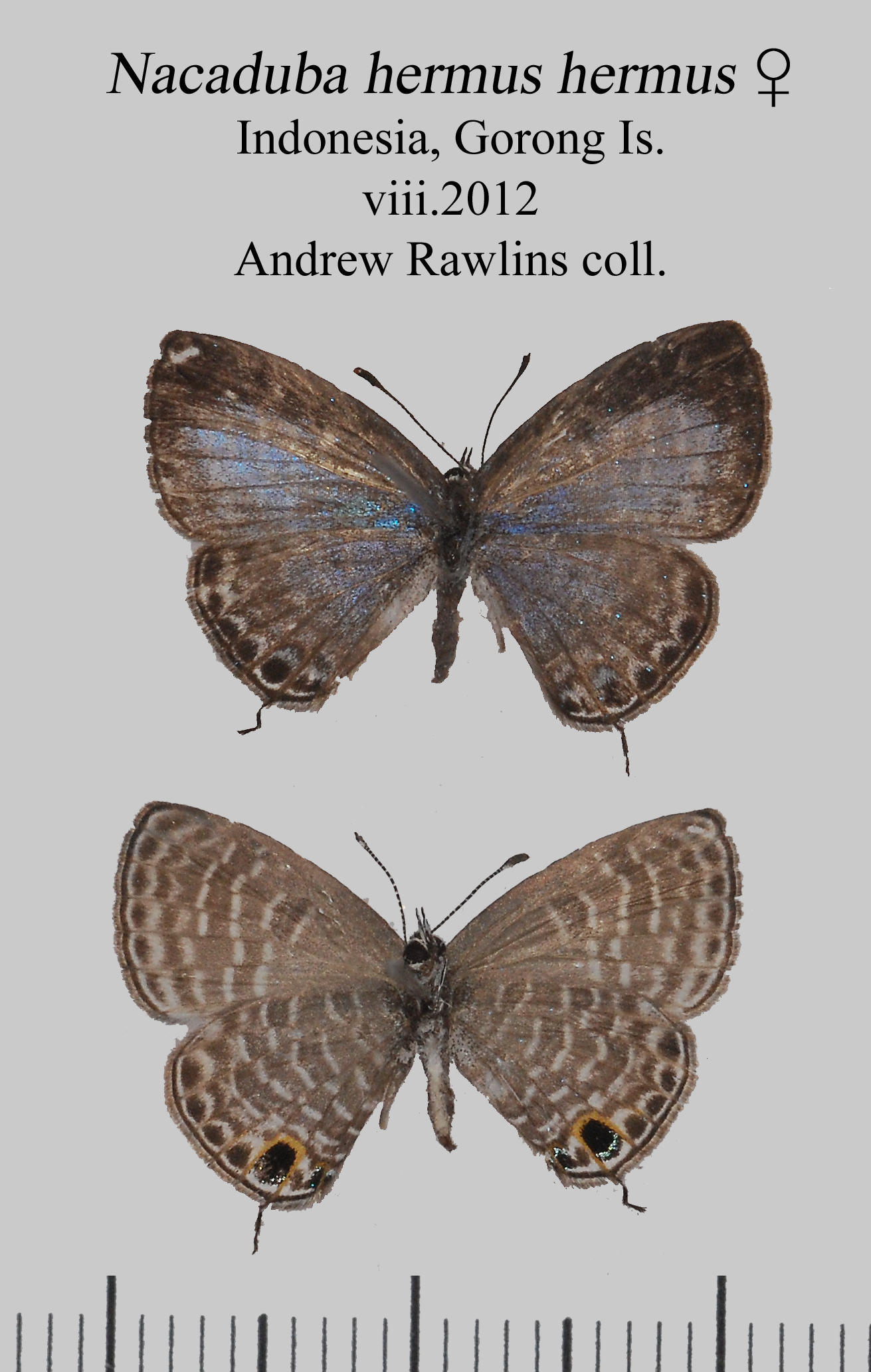
- Nacaduba hermus from Indonesia

Scientific classification
- Domain: Eukaryota
- Kingdom: Animalia
- Phylum: Arthropoda
- Class: Insecta
- Order: Lepidoptera
- Family: Lycaenidae
- Subfamily: Polyommatinae
- Tribe: Polyommatini
- Genus: Nacaduba; Moore, 1881

Species
- Numerous, see text

Synonyms
- Hypojamides Riley, 1929; Pepliphorus Hübner, 1819 (suppressed)

= Nacaduba =

Butterfly genus in family Lycaenidae

Nacaduba is a genus of gossamer-winged butterflies (Lycaenidae). It constitutes many of the species commonly called "lineblues". As they are the genus initially erected to contain all lineblues, they might be considered the "typical" lineblues, as opposed to the species relatives now separated in Catopyrops, Petrelaea and Prosotas.

== Selected species ==
- Nacaduba angusta (Druce, 1873) - white lineblue
- Nacaduba berenice (Herrich-Schäffer, 1869) - rounded six-line blue
  - Nacaduba berenice leei Hsu, 1990
- Nacaduba beroe (Felder & Felder, 1865) - opaque six-line blue
  - Nacaduba beroe asakusa Fruhstorfer, 1916
- Nacaduba biocellata (C. & R. Felder, [1865]) - double-spotted line blue
- Nacaduba calauria (C. Felder, 1860) - dark Ceylon six-line blue
- Nacaduba cyanea (Cramer, [1775]) - tailed green-banded line-blue
- Nacaduba hermus Felder, 1860 - pale four-line blue
- Nacaduba kurava (Moore, 1857) - transparent six-line blue
  - Nacaduba kurava therasia Fruhstorfer, 1916
- Nacaduba ollyetti Corbet, 1947 - Woodhouse's Four Lineblue
- Nacaduba pactolus (C. Felder, 1860) - large four-line blue
  - Nacaduba pactolus hainani Bethune-Baker, 1914
- Nacaduba pavana (Horsfield, 1828) - small four-line blue
- Nacaduba sanaya Fruhstorfer, 1916 Sulawesi, Philippines, Banggai, Celebes, Nias, Peninsular Malaya, Langkawi, Singapore, Sumatra, Borneo, Java
- Nacaduba schneideri (Ribbe, 1899)
- Nacaduba sinhala (Ormiston, 1924) - Ceylon six-line blue
