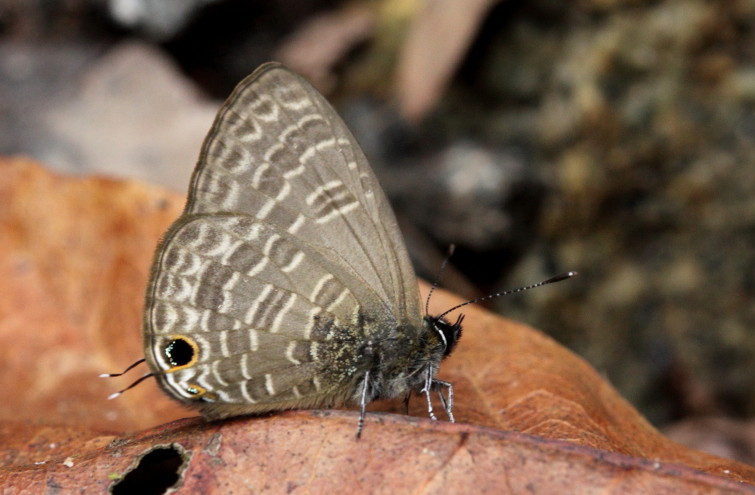
- N. h. sidoma, Kerala

Scientific classification
- Kingdom: Animalia
- Phylum: Arthropoda
- Clade: Pancrustacea
- Class: Insecta
- Order: Lepidoptera
- Family: Lycaenidae
- Genus: Nacaduba
- Species: N. hermus

Binomial name
- Nacaduba hermus Felder, 1860

= Nacaduba hermus =

Pale four-line blue

Species of butterfly

Nacaduba hermus, the pale four-line blue, is a species of lycaenid butterfly found in Indomalaya. The species was described by Baron Cajetan von Felder in 1860.

== Description ==
=== Male ===
The upperside is dark purplish brown. The forewings and hindwings have black anteciliary lines. The hindwing has two black spots that are nearly equal, one in interspace 1 and the other in interspace 2. The spots have a silvery white edge on the outerside. The tail is black tipped with white.

The underside is hoary brown. On the underside of the forewing are transverse bands of the ground colour defined by fine white lines:

- A band across the middle of the cell extends from the subcostal vein to vein 1.
- The discocellulars and a bisinuate discal band extend from veins 1 to 7; succeeding these are an inner and an outer subterminal series of transversely elongate spots somewhat darker than the ground colour and a slender black anteciliary line.
- Each row of the subterminal series of spots is obscurely bordered inwardly and outwardly with whitish.

The hindwing has transverse bands of the ground colour enclosed and defined as on the forewing by short slender lunular lines of white as follows:

- a subbasal band across the cell, another at the apex extended from vein 8 to vein 1, and abruptly turned upward and terminating on the dorsal margin;
- an irregular and sinuate discal band from vein 8 to vein l, then bent upwards to dorsum; beyond these an inner and an outer subterminal series of white lunules. The inner series is obscure, while in the outer series the lunules in interspaces 1, 2, and 3 are prominent.

Interspace 1 has two minute geminate (paired) black subterminal spots. Interspace 2 has one large round black similar spot crowned inwardly with ochraceous and irrorated outwardly with a few metallic blue scales; a slender terminal white line is not extended to the apex and an anteciliary dark line.

The antennae are black, with shafts minutely ringed with white. The head, thorax, and abdomen are dark brown. Beneath, the palpi are fringed with black hairs. The thorax is fuscous and the abdomen is dull white.

=== Female ===
The female has the upperside dull leaden blue. The forewings and hindwings have anteciliary black lines as in the male, within which on the forewing is an obscure transverse subterminal series of black spots; on the hindwing a slender terminal white line, a subterminal row of black spots and a postdiscal series of white lunules, the spots decreasing in size and the lunules obsolescent anteriorly. Underside: ground colour paler than the markings, more obscure but identical with those of the male. Antennae, head, thorax and abdomen are as in the male, but all paler in colour.

== Distribution ==
They inhabit Nepal, Sikkim; the Western Ghats; Sri Lanka; Assam; Myanmar (Tenasserim); the Andamans.
