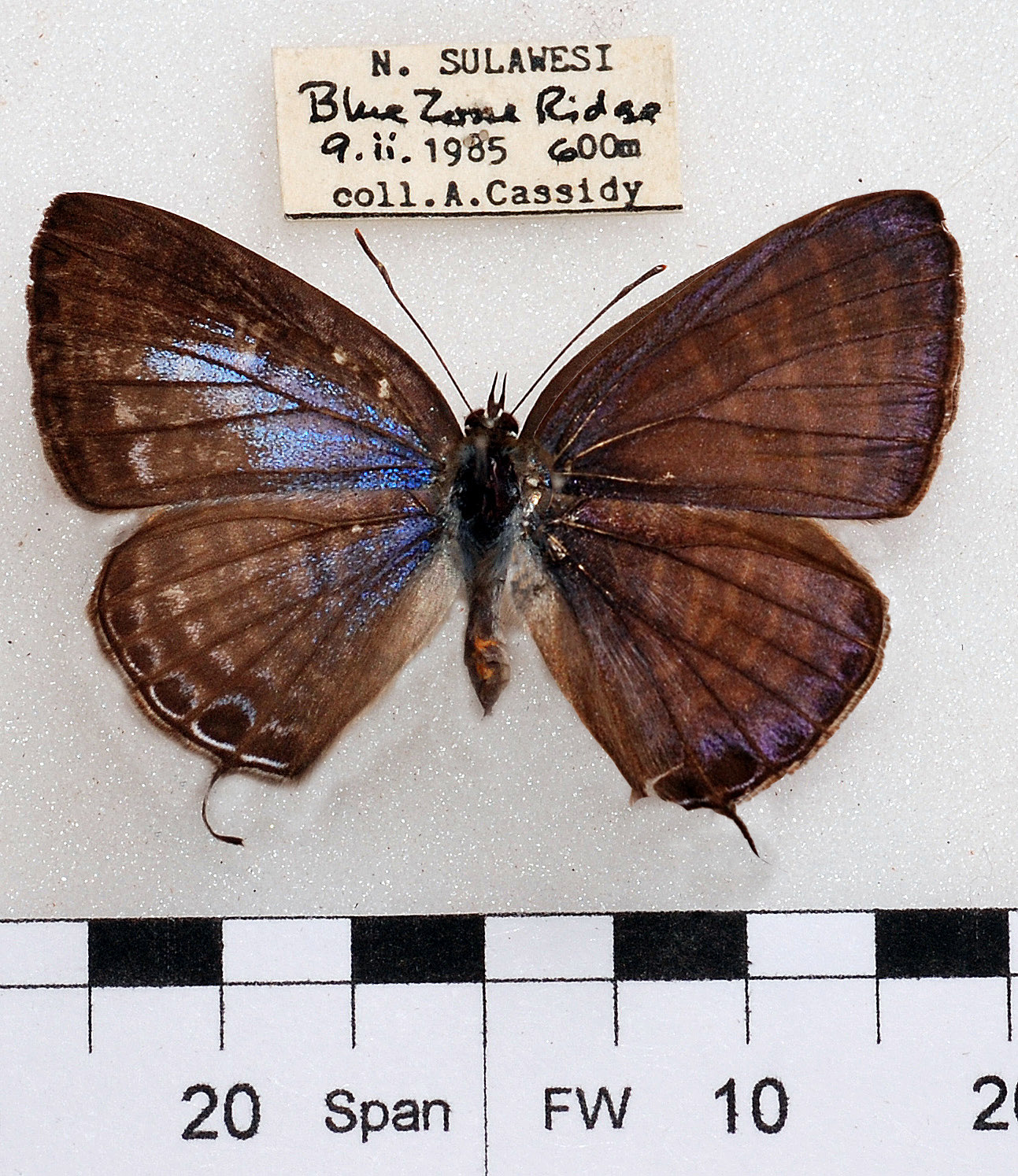
- Nacaduba pactolus pactolides from Sulawesi
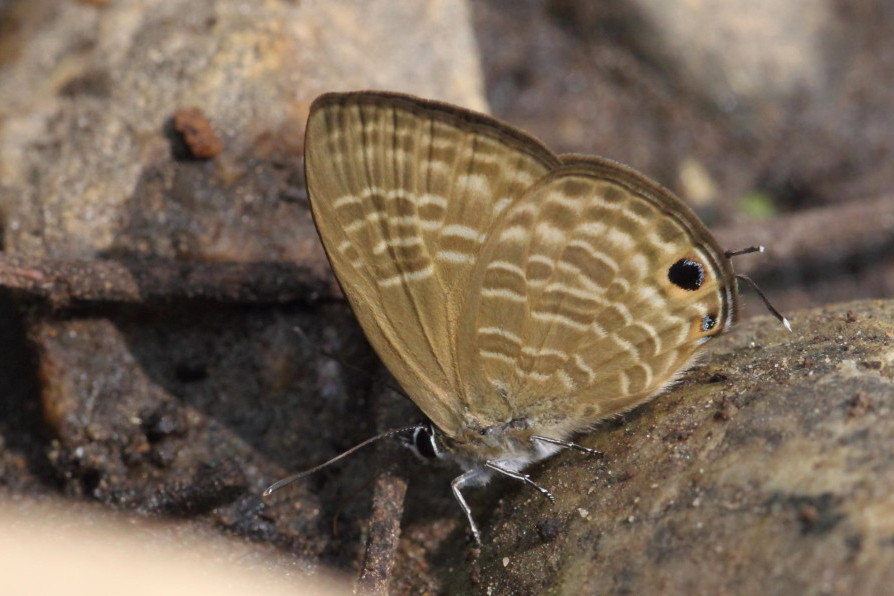

Scientific classification
- Kingdom: Animalia
- Phylum: Arthropoda
- Clade: Pancrustacea
- Class: Insecta
- Order: Lepidoptera
- Family: Lycaenidae
- Genus: Nacaduba
- Species: N. pactolus

Binomial name
- Nacaduba pactolus (C. Felder, 1860)

Synonyms
- Lycaena macrophthalma Felder, 1862

= Nacaduba pactolus =

Large four-line blue

Species of butterfly

Nacaduba pactolus, the large four-line blue, is a species of lycaenid butterfly found in Indomalayan realm.

== Description ==
A very variable form both in the shade of the ground colour on the upperside and in the width, and more or less in the arrangement also of the transverse white lines that cross the wings. Typical male: upperside: deep purplish brown with a curious minutely granular roughened appearance; in certain lights the purple shines with iridescent blue tints. Forewings and hindwings: uniform; both with slender anteciliary black lines; on the hindwing the black spots on the tornal angle on the underside show through by transparency. Cilia brownish; filamentous tail at apex of vein 2 on the hindwing black tipped with white. Underside: brown with a slight silky lustre. Forewings and hindwings: with the following transverse, more or less broken, slender, dull whitish bands: two short bands, one on either side of the discocellulars; a discal pair, the posterior portion below vein 3 shifted inwards, thus forming the stem of a rough Y-shaped figure of which the pair of bands along the discocellulars and the anterior portion of the discal two bands may be said to form the branches; beyond these are an inner and an outer subterminal lunular line, a terminal very slender more continuous line and a jet-black anteciliary line; all these markings faint or obsolescent along the costa. Hindwing: a subbasal pair of similar, dull whitish slender bands or interrupted lines, two shorter ones, one on either side of the discocellulars, and a much curved and very much interrupted pair of discal lines, the portion of which below vein 3 is shifted inwards as on the forewing; terminal markings much as on the forewing but ending at vein 3, posterior to which in interspace 2 is a large round black spot, in interspace 1a smaller black spot, both spots crowned inwardly with ochraceous and edged outwardly with white, also both black spots are sprinkled on their outer edges with metallic blue scales. Antennae, head, thorax and abdomen dark brown, a little purplish on the thorax; beneath: the palpi white mixed with black hairs that form a stiff fringe; thorax and abdomen brownish white.

Typical female: upperside: dark brown, forewings and hindwings posteriorly for two-thirds of their length glossed with iridescent purplish blue. Underside: similar to that of the male, the markings more clearly defined. Antennae, head, thorax and abdomen as in the male but the shafts of the antennae speckled with white.

Specimens which may belong to wet-season broods differ as follows: Male upperside: ground colour darker. Underside: ground colour fuscous brown, much darker than in the typical form, the transverse white lines or bands further apart, the space enclosed between the discocellular pair and between the discal pair darker than the ground colour. On the hindwing the white lines are medially interrupted by a very broad longitudinal fuscous-black streak that extends from the base of the wing to the inner subterminal, transverse, lunular white line. Female. Does not seem to differ from the female of the typical form. Still other specimens, the difference in which may be due to locality or season (I have not been able to examine a sufficient number of dated and exactly localized specimens to make certain) seem to be intermediate between typical macrophthalma and typical kerriana Distant. These specimens differ from macrophthalma as follows: Male upperside: anteciliary black lines on both forewings and hindwings distinctly broader, more pronounced. Underside: transverse white lines on both forewings and hindwings much broader with a tendency to become diffuse and shift inwards or outwards and thus change the pattern; this is especially conspicuous on the hindwings of some of the specimens where the typical pattern is altogether confused and lost by the presence of additional short lunular white lines, and the shifting obliquely inwards or outwards of some of the lines that make up the typical pattern. There is, however, no abrupt change, intermediate specimens seem to link the most aberrant with the typical. Some of the specimens before me show also a tendency to the development of transverse series of dark subterminal spots on the underside of the forewing as in N. kerriana, Distant. Female similar to the female of the typical form but on the upperside the iridescent blue at the base of the wings changes gradually to whitish on the disc and beyond the apex of cell. Underside: with broad transverse white lines as in the male varieties.

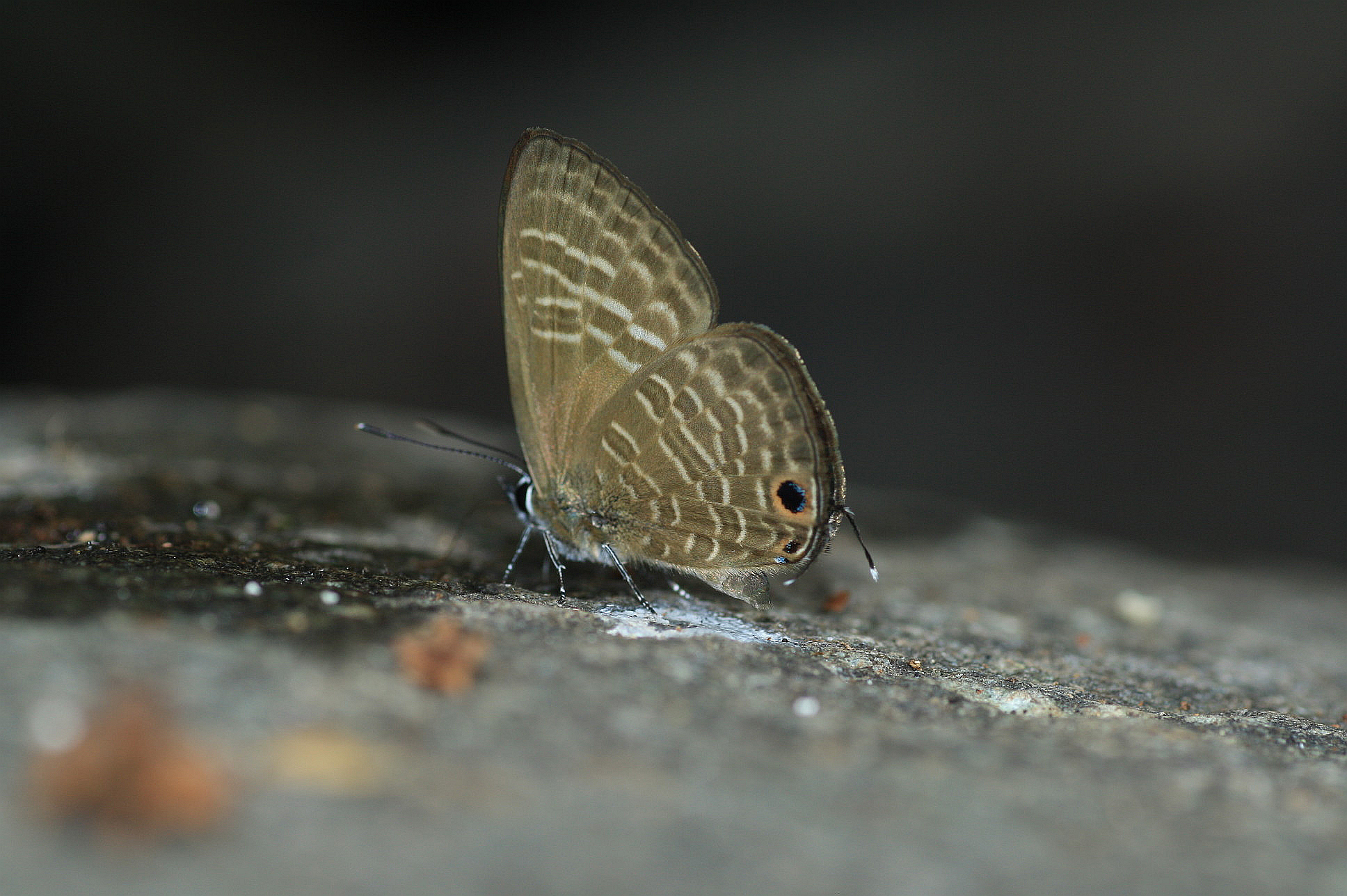
In Udupi, Karnataka, India

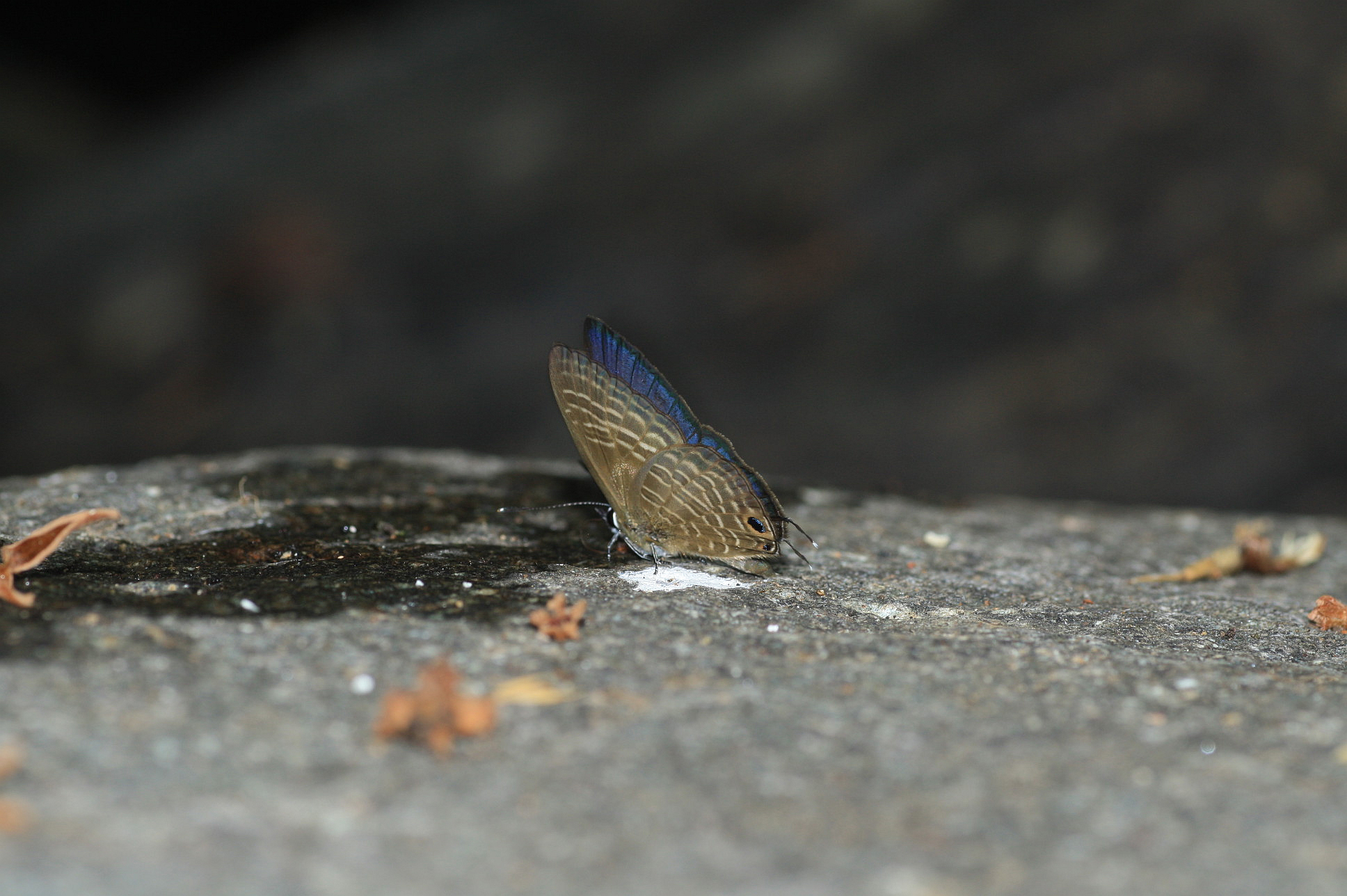
In Udupi
