= Grevillol =

Names
- IUPAC name 5-tridecylbenzene-1,3-diol
- Other names: Grevillol; 5-Tridecyl-1,2-benzenediol; 5-Tridecylresorcinol

Identifiers
CAS Number	5259-01-8
3D model (JSmol)	Interactive image
ChEBI	CHEBI:5545
ChEMBL	ChEMBL451044
ChemSpider	152482
ECHA InfoCard	100.190.335
EC Number	664-084-6
KEGG	C10800
PubChem CID	174862
CompTox Dashboard (EPA)	DTXSID60200564
- InChI: InChI=1S/C19H32O2/c1-2-3-4-5-6-7-8-9-10-11-12-13-17-14-18(20)16-19(21)15-17/h14-16,20-21H,2-13H2,1H3 Key: UXOGOSLLGMYCNL-UHFFFAOYSA-N
- SMILES: CCCCCCCCCCCCCC1=CC(=CC(=C1)O)O

Properties
Chemical formula	C_{19}H_{32}O_{2}
Molar mass	292.463 g·mol^{−1}
Appearance	White solid
Melting point	81-82 °C
Solubility in water	2.14×10^{−2} mg/L
Vapor pressure	1.73×10^{−6} Pa

Hazards
- GHS labelling
Pictograms	(GHS05: Corrosive) (GHS07: Exclamation mark)
Signal word	Danger
Hazard statements	H317, H318
Precautionary statements	P261, P264+P265, P272, P280, P302+P352, P305+P354+P338, P317, P321, P333+P317, P362+P364, P501
- Except where otherwise noted, data are given for materials in their standard state (at 25 °C [77 °F], 100 kPa). Infobox references

Grevillol is an alkylresorcinol with a tridecyl side chain. It is a white solid and a natural product, occurring in several species. It is also an allergic contact sensitizer and exhibits cytotoxicity.

== Occurrence ==
Grevillol is found in several Grevillea species native to Australia, notably Grevillea robusta. It also occurs in Australian brown algae species, including Cystophora torulosa and Caulocystis cephalornithos.

== Reactions ==
Grevillol can be used as a precursor in the synthesis of rapanone, a 2,5-dihydroxy-1,4-benzoquinone derivative.
