= Streptomyces cinerochromogenes =

Scientific classification
- Domain: Bacteria
- Kingdom: Bacillati
- Phylum: Actinomycetota
- Class: Actinomycetia
- Order: Streptomycetales
- Family: Streptomycetaceae
- Genus: Streptomyces
- Species: S. cinerochromogenes

Binomial name
- Streptomyces cinerochromogenes Miyairi et al. 1966

Type strain
- AS 4.162, ATCC 33339, CGMCC 4.1620, DSM 41651, Fuji 50, IFO 13822, IFO 13922, JCM 3385, NBRC 13822, NBRC 13922, NRRL B-1692, NRRL B-16928, P1

Species of bacterium

Streptomyces cinerochromogenes is a bacterium species from the genus of Streptomyces which has been isolated from soil from Tama Graveyard in Tokyo in Japan. Streptomyces cinerochromogenes produces and cineromycin A and cineromycin B.

== See also ==
- List of Streptomyces species
