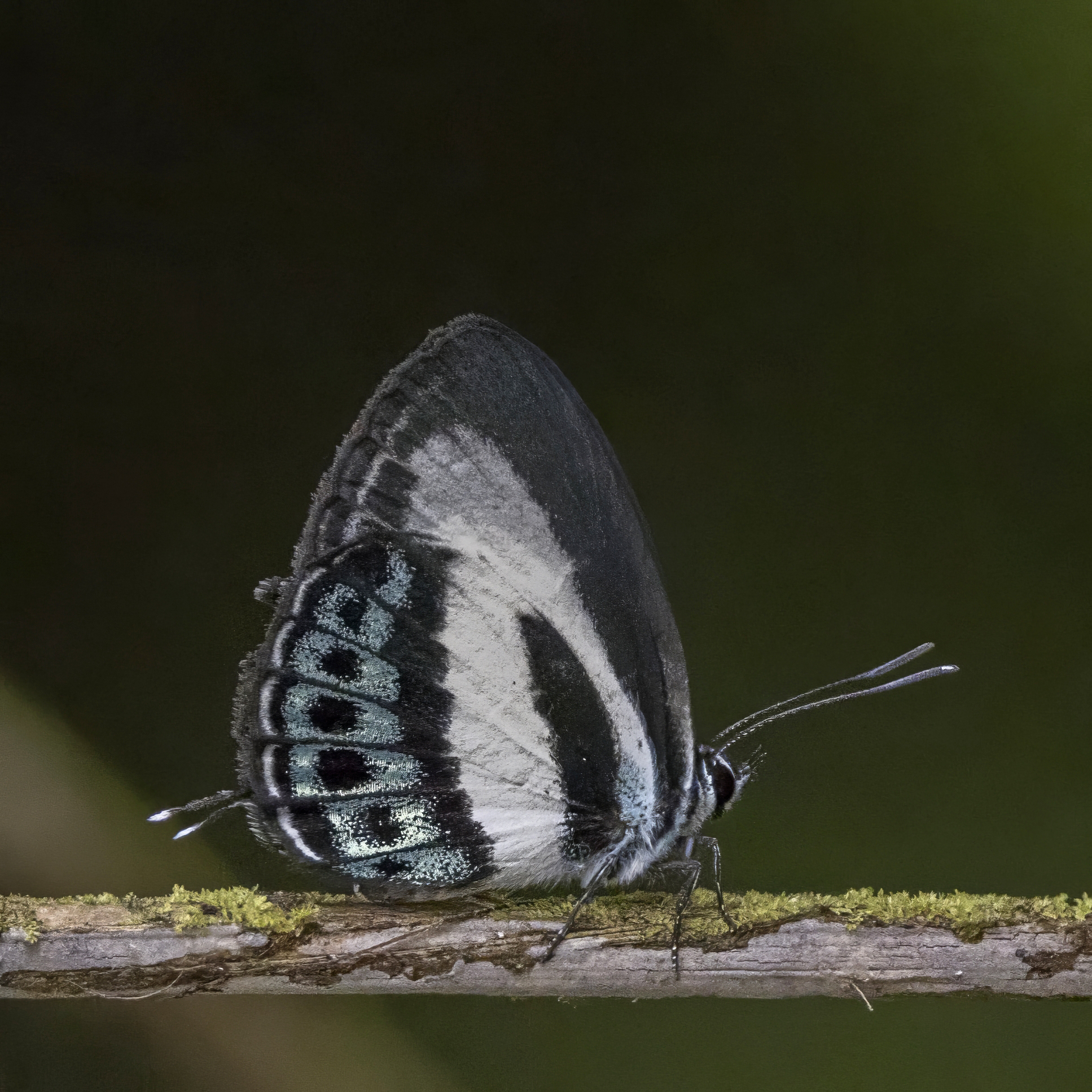
- Daintree Rainforest, Queensland
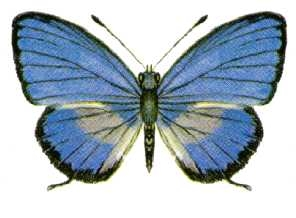

Scientific classification
- Domain: Eukaryota
- Kingdom: Animalia
- Phylum: Arthropoda
- Class: Insecta
- Order: Lepidoptera
- Family: Lycaenidae
- Genus: Nacaduba
- Species: N. cyanea

Binomial name
- Nacaduba cyanea (Cramer, [1775])

Subspecies
- See text

Synonyms
- Papilio cyanea Cramer, [1775]; Damis epicoritus Boisduval, 1832; Thysonotis cyanea arinides Fruhstorfer, 1915; Lycaena (Thysonotis) sperchius C. & R. Felder, 1860; Thysonotis sperchius C. & R. Felder, [1865]; Lycaena pindus C. & R. Felder, [1865]; Cupido arinia Oberthür, 1878; Danis albastola Lucas, 1889; Plebeius illustris Röber, 1886; Thysonotis chromia Druce, 1891; Thysonotis smaragdus Druce & Bethune-Baker, 1893; Thysonotis hamilcar Grose-Smith, 1894; Thysonotis hamilcar ab. intermedius Ribbe, 1899; Thysonotis hamilcar var. pseudochromia Ribbe, 1899; Thysonotis rosselana Bethune-Baker, 1908

= Nacaduba cyanea =

Species of butterfly

Nacaduba cyanea, the tailed green-banded line-blue, is a species of butterfly in the family Lycaenidae, and formerly considered a member of the genus Danis. It is found in the Indonesia (Irian Jaya, Maluku), Papua New Guinea, the Solomon Islands and Australia (Queensland).

The wingspan is about 30 mm. Adult males are blue with a dark brown wing margin, with a pale blue to white patch on the hindwing. Females are white, with a black border around the wings and a row of blue-edged black spots.

The larvae feed on Entada phaseoloides and Entada scandens. They are bright green, with pale brown heads. The larvae are attended to by ants of the genus Anonychomyrma. Pupation takes place in a brown pupa with dark markings.

== Subspecies ==
- N. c. arinia (Oberthür, 1878) (Torres Straits Islands, Cooktown to Ingham) - tailed green-banded blue
- N. c. carissima (Grose-Smith & Kirby, 1895) (Flores, Pura, Tanimbar, Timor)
- N. c. chromia (Druce, 1891) (northern Solomons)
- N. c. cyanea (Cramer, 1775) (Ambon, Seram)
- N. c. epicoritus (Boisduval, 1832) (Aru, Gebe, New Guinea, Waigeo)
- N. c. hamilcar (Grose-Smith, 1894) (Admiralty Islands, Bismarck Archipelago)
- N. c. illustris (Röber, 1886) (Kai Islands)
- N. c. murua (Tennent, 2015) (Woodlark Island)
- N. c. obiana (Fruhstorfer, 1915) (Obi)
- N. c. pindus (C. & R. Felder, [1865]) (Bacan, Halmahera, Morotai, Ternate, Salawati)
- N. c. rosselana (Bethune-Baker, 1908) (Louisade Archipelago)
- N. c. sanane (Tennent & Gassó Miracle, 2016) (Buru)
- N. c. smaragdus (Druce & Bethune-Baker, 1893) (Dammer, Wetar)
