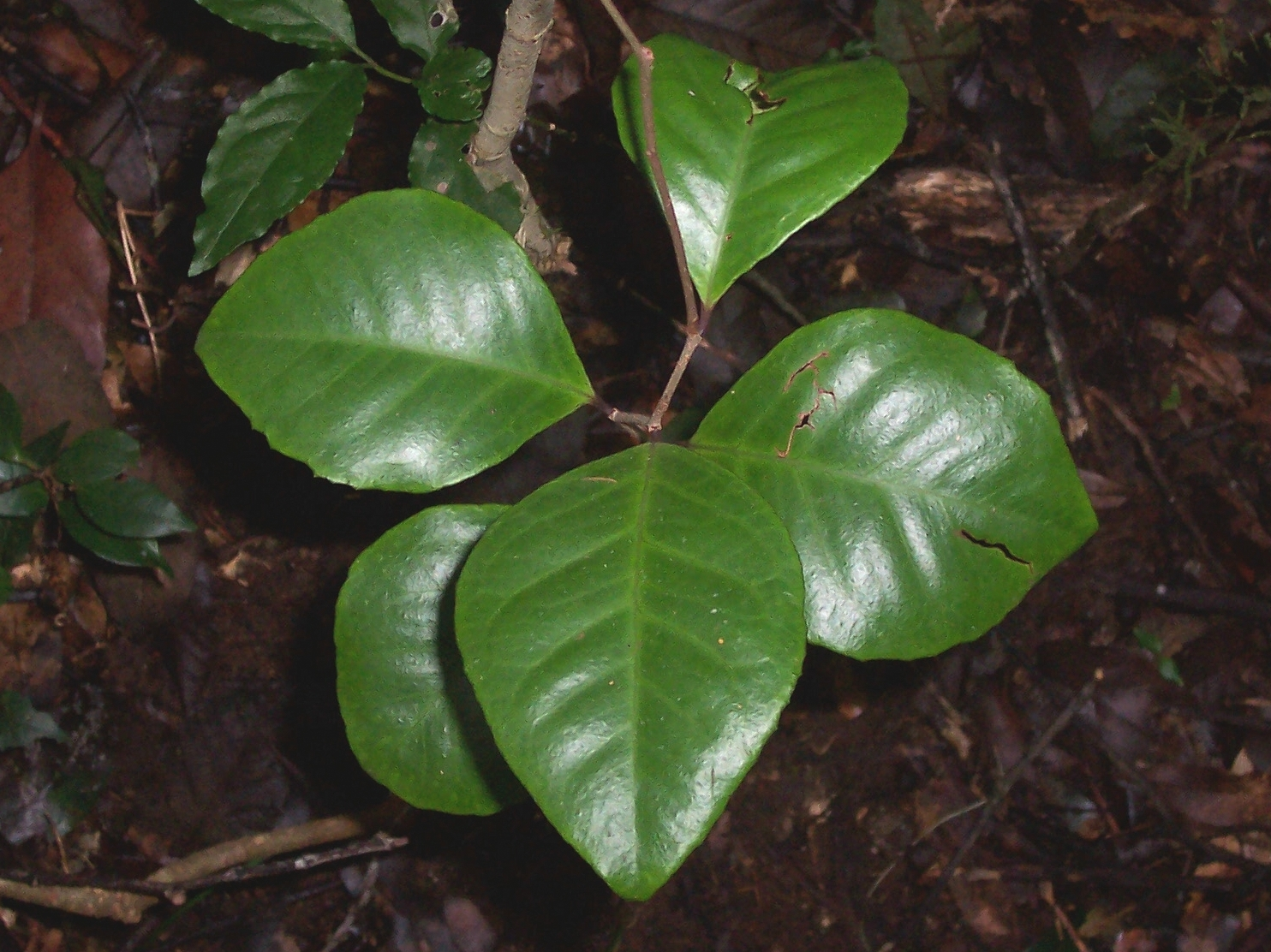
- Juvenile at Mount Banda Banda, Australia

Scientific classification
- Kingdom: Plantae
- Clade: Tracheophytes
- Clade: Angiosperms
- Clade: Eudicots
- Clade: Asterids
- Order: Ericales
- Family: Primulaceae
- Genus: Embelia
- Species: E. australiana

Binomial name
- Embelia australiana (F.Muell.) F.M.Bailey

= Embelia australiana =

Species of flowering plant

Embelia australiana is a climbing plant found in rainforests of eastern Australia.
