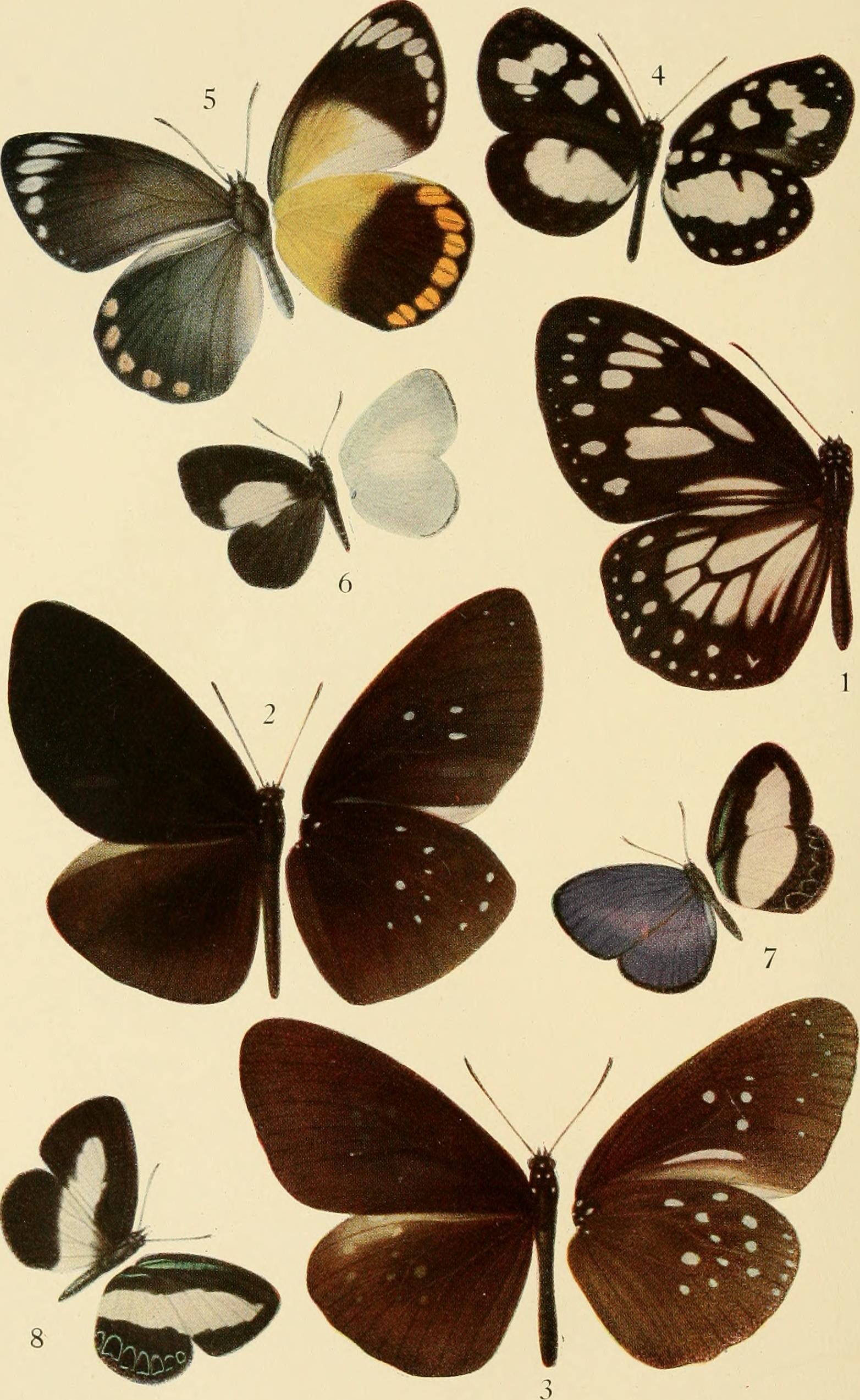
- Danis dissimilis female (figures 7, 8)

Scientific classification
- Domain: Eukaryota
- Kingdom: Animalia
- Phylum: Arthropoda
- Class: Insecta
- Order: Lepidoptera
- Family: Lycaenidae
- Genus: Danis
- Species: D. dissimilis

Binomial name
- Danis dissimilis Joicey & Talbot, 1916

Synonyms
- Thysonotis dissimilis Joicey & Talbot, 1916

= Danis dissimilis =

Species of butterfly

Danis dissimilis is a butterfly in the family Lycaenidae. It was described by James John Joicey and George Talbot in 1916. It is endemic to the Schouten Islands in the Australasian realm.
