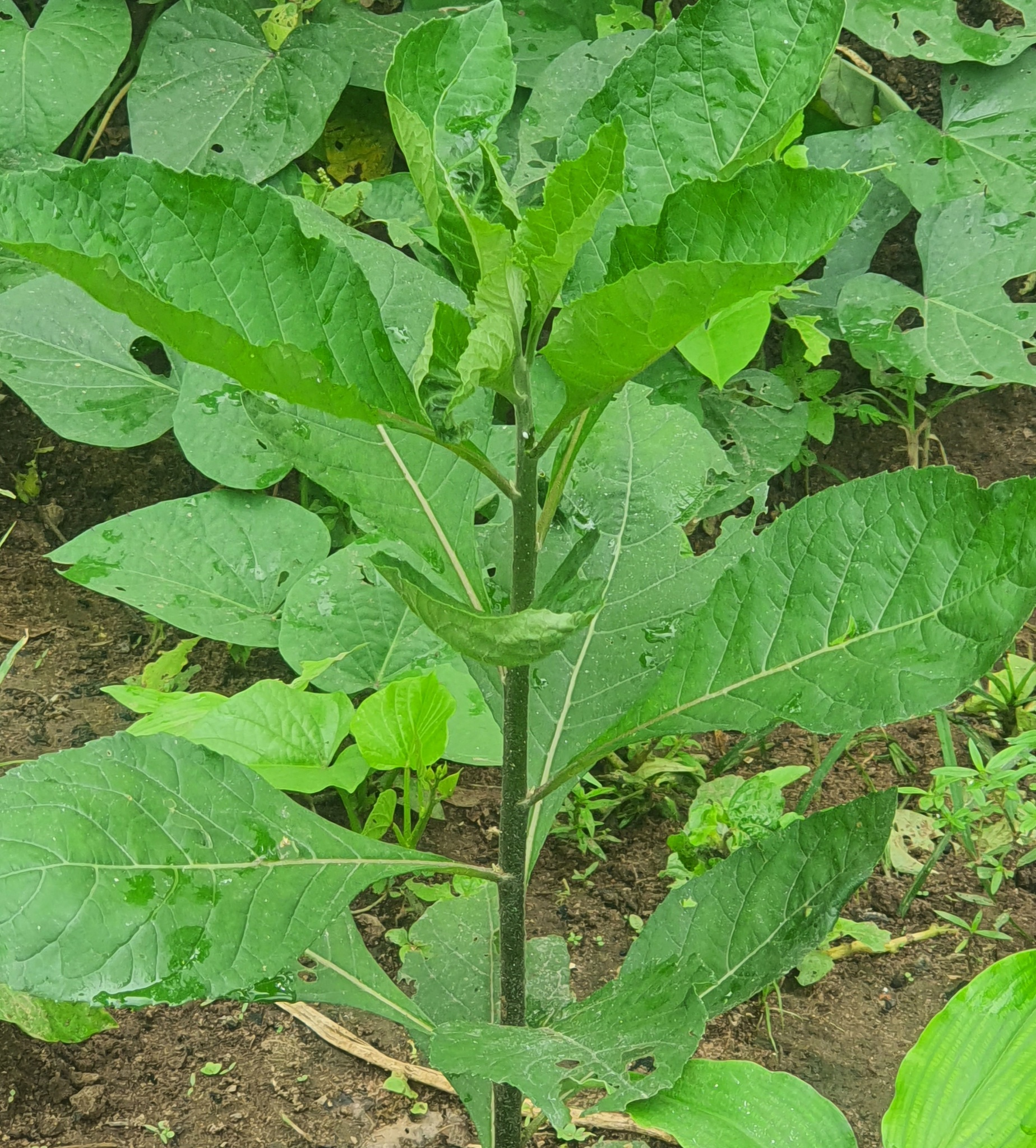

Scientific classification
- Kingdom: Plantae
- Clade: Tracheophytes
- Clade: Angiosperms
- Clade: Eudicots
- Clade: Asterids
- Order: Ericales
- Family: Primulaceae
- Genus: Embelia
- Species: E. ruminata

Binomial name
- Embelia ruminata (E.Mey. ex A.DC.) Mez

= Embelia ruminata =

Species of plant

Embelia ruminata, also known by the common name bitter leaf, is a species from the genus Embelia.
