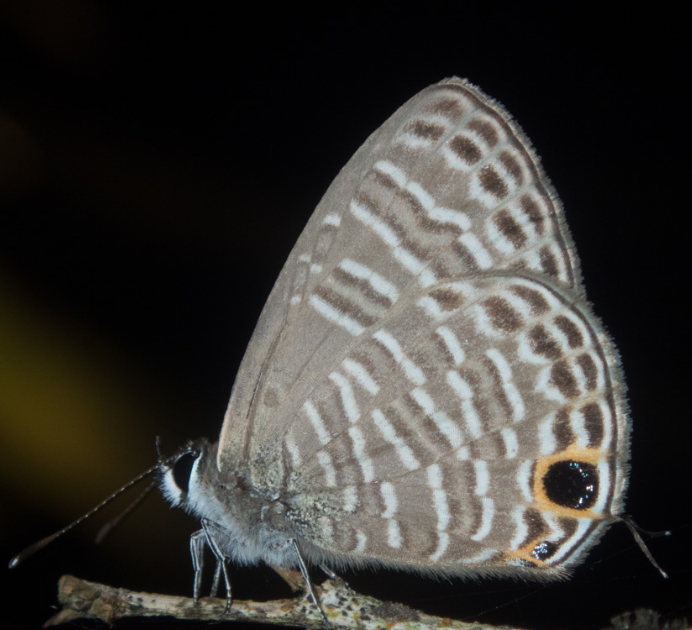
- Underside
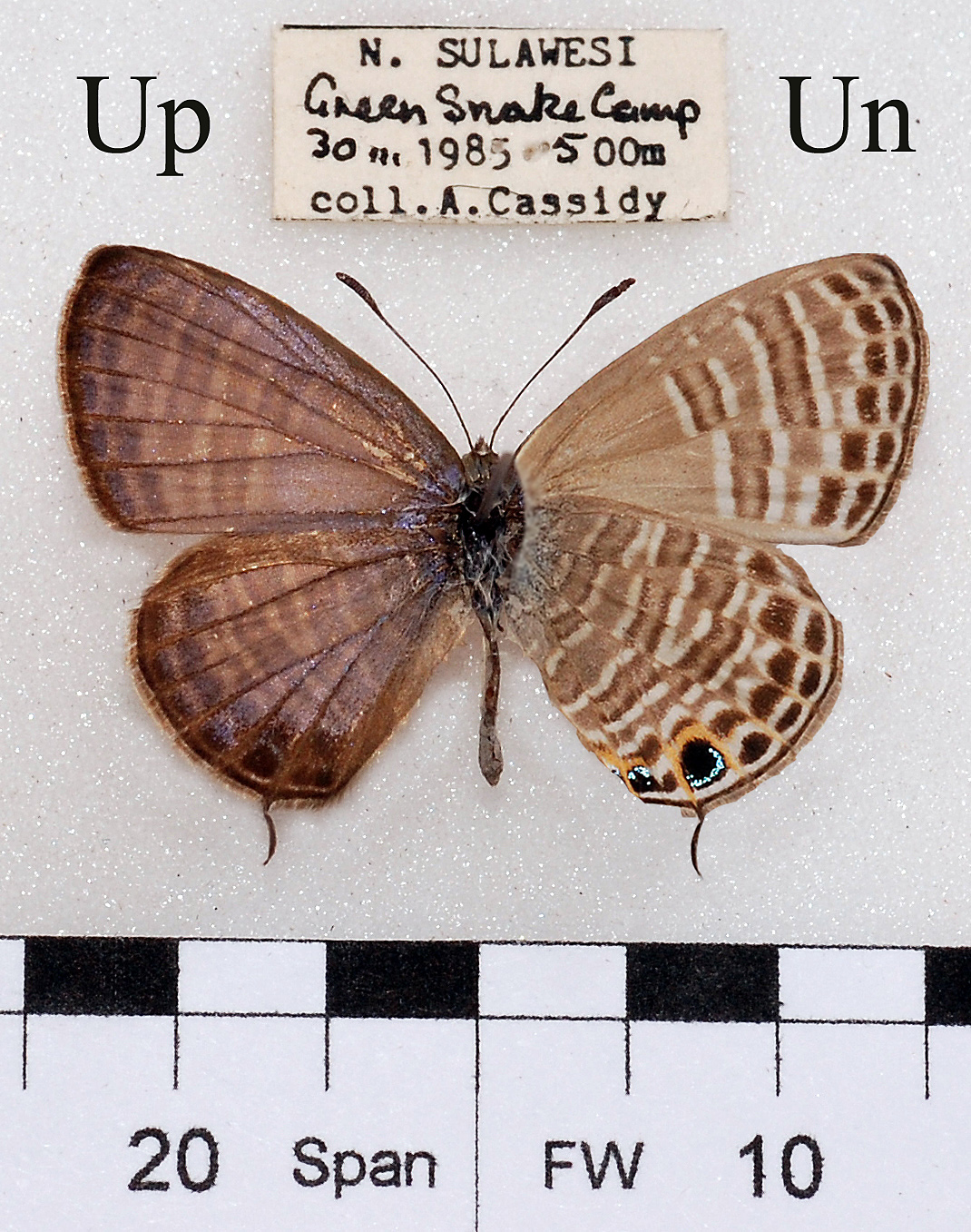

Scientific classification
- Domain: Eukaryota
- Kingdom: Animalia
- Phylum: Arthropoda
- Class: Insecta
- Order: Lepidoptera
- Family: Lycaenidae
- Genus: Nacaduba
- Species: N. pavana

Binomial name
- Nacaduba pavana (Horsfield, 1828)

= Nacaduba pavana =

Species of butterfly

Nacaduba pavana, the small four-line blue or Singapore four-line blue, is a species of lycaenid butterfly found in Southeast Asia.

== Description ==
Male upperside: purple with a frosted silvery-blue sheen very much as in N. macrophthalma. Forewing: a slender black anteciliary line. Hindwing: costal and dorsal margins somewhat broadly dull brown, an anteciliary black line as on the forewing; the subterminal black spots in interspaces 1 and 2 of the underside apparent in most specimens by transparency. Underside: ground colour and markings similar to those of N. macrophthalma but far more slender and more neatly defined. Antennae, head, thorax and abdomen as in N. macrophthalma.

Female upperside, forewing: costa broadly, apex and termen still more broadly brown; a narrow edging of pale brown along the dorsal margin; rest of the wing grey, shot with iridescent blue in certain lights. Hindwing: pale brown, much paler than the brown on the forewing; base very obscurely shot with iridescent blue; costal and dorsal margins brownish white; a transverse subterminal series of black spots edged inwardly and outwardly with slender white lines, two minute spots in interspace 1 geminate (paired), that in interspace 2 large, these three crowned inwardly beyond the white edging with an additional dusky spot. Underside: very similar to that of the male, ground colour paler, transverse white strigae broader. Both male and female have the basal area of the forewing within the transverse white strigae lining the inner side of the discocellulars immaculate, as in N. macrophthalma and N. kerriana.

== Distribution ==
Charles Thomas Bingham (1907) reports the butterfly from Sikkim; Bhutan; Assam; Cachar; Burma; Tenasserim; the Andamans. Described originally from Java.

As per Savela the butterfly ranges from Tibet, India - Myanmar, Thailand, Malaysia, Singapore, Langkawi, Sumatra, Philippines (Mindanao) and Sulawesi.

== Taxonomy ==
The butterfly has five subspecies:

- N. p. pavana
- N. p. singapura
- N. p. vajuva
- N. p. georgi
- N. p. visuna

=== N. p. vajuva ===
The subspecies N. p. vajuva Frühstorfer 1916, which is known as the violet four-line blue, occurs in India, Myanmar and Thailand. It was earlier considered a separate species.

== See also ==
- List of butterflies of India (Lycaenidae)
