= Embelia rowlandii =

Scientific classification
- Kingdom: Plantae
- Clade: Tracheophytes
- Clade: Angiosperms
- Clade: Eudicots
- Clade: Asterids
- Order: Ericales
- Family: Primulaceae
- Genus: Embelia
- Species: E. rowlandii

Binomial name
- Embelia rowlandii Gilg

Synonyms
- Embelia dahomensis A.Chev.

Species of flowering plants

Embelia rowlandii is a shrub belonging to the family Primulaceae. The species is a climber with a greyish bark that is usually covered in fine hairs and pale lenticels when younger.

== Description ==
Leaves are obovate to elliptic in shape, they can reach 13 cm in length and 7 cm in width. Inflorescence arranged in axillary racemes with whitish to creamy yellow flowers.

== Distribution ==
Occurs in Tropical West Africa from Senegal to Nigeria and eastwards to the Central African Republic, it is found along streams in savannahs.
