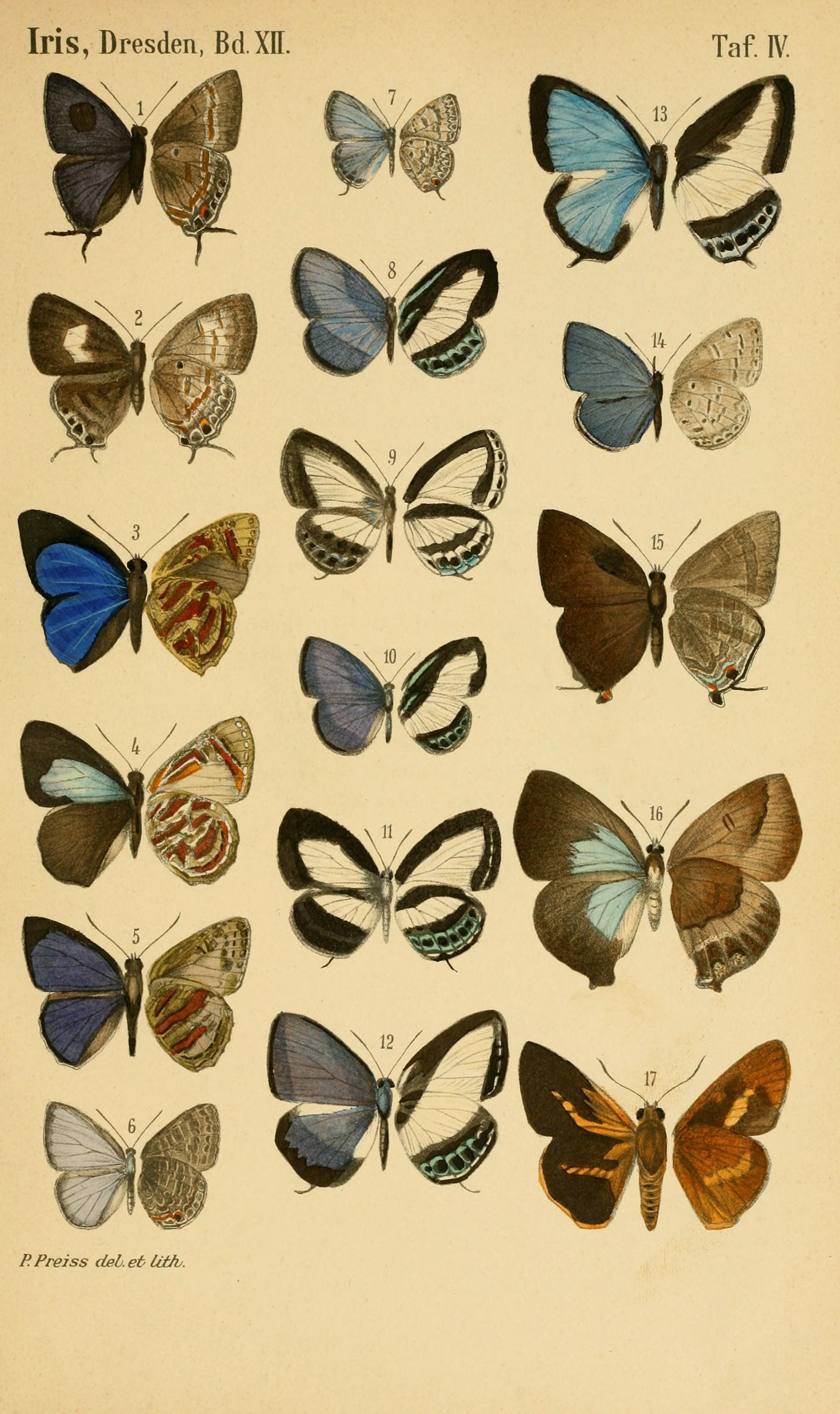
- Nacaduba schneideri in Deutsche Entomologische Zeitschrift Iris 1899 fig 12 male

Scientific classification
- Domain: Eukaryota
- Kingdom: Animalia
- Phylum: Arthropoda
- Class: Insecta
- Order: Lepidoptera
- Family: Lycaenidae
- Genus: Nacaduba
- Species: N. schneideri

Binomial name
- Nacaduba schneideri (Ribbe 1899)

= Nacaduba schneideri =

Species of butterfly

Nacaduba schneideri is a species of lycaenid butterfly found in the Australasian realm where it is endemic to the Bismarck Archipelago. The species was first described by Carl Ribbe in 1899.
