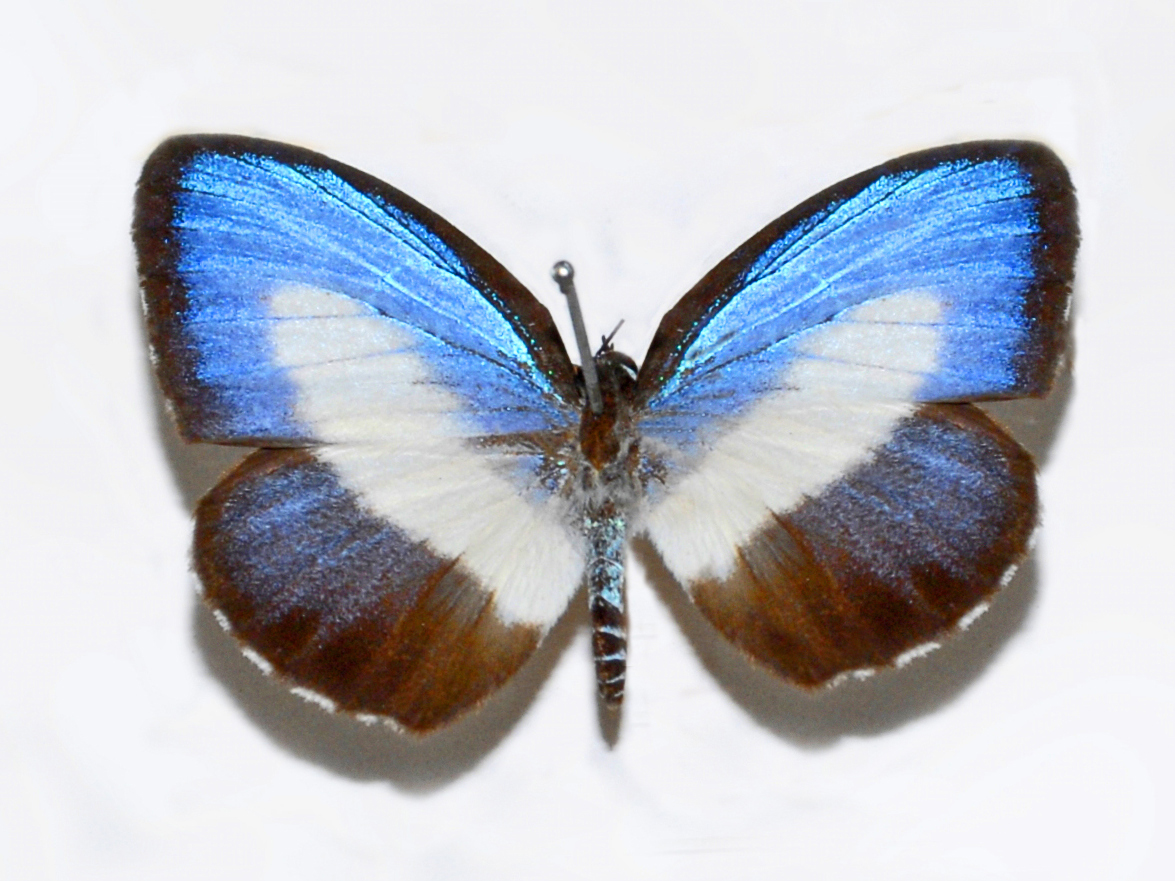
- A Danis species from New Guinea

Scientific classification
- Kingdom: Animalia
- Phylum: Arthropoda
- Clade: Pancrustacea
- Class: Insecta
- Order: Lepidoptera
- Family: Lycaenidae
- Subfamily: Polyommatinae
- Tribe: Polyommatini
- Genus: Danis; Fabricius, 1807

Synonyms
- Hadothera Billberg, 1820; Damis Boisduval, 1832; Isselia C. & R. Felder, 1862; Perpheres (Polyommatini) Hirowatari, 1992; Thysonotus Westwood, 1852

= Danis (butterfly) =

Butterfly genus in family Lycaenidae

Danis is a genus of butterflies in the family Lycaenidae. The species of this genus are found in the Australasian realm.

== Species ==
- Danis absyrtus Felder & Felder 1859
- Danis albomarginata Rothschild, 1915 Misol
- Danis albostrigata Bethune-Baker, 1908 New Guinea
- Danis anaximens Fruhstorfer, 1907 Kumusi River New Guinea
- Danis annamensis Fruhstorfer, 1903
- Danis aryanus Grose-Smith, 1895 Halmahera
- Danis athanetus Danis melimnos ssp. athanetus Fruhstorfer, 1915 New Guinea
- Danis beata Röber, 1926 New Guinea
- Danis caelinus Grose-Smith
- Danis caesius Grose-Smith, 1894 New Guinea
- Danis caledonica Felder and Felder, 1865
- Danis carissima Grose-Smith & Kirby, 1895 Watter and Pura (Philippines?)
- Danis coelinus Grose-Smith, 1898 Fergusson Island
- Danis concolor
- Danis coroneia Fruhstorfer, 1915 New Hannover
- Danis danis
- Danis dispar Grose-Smith & Kirby, 1895 New Britain
- Danis dissimilis Joicey & Talbot, 1916 Schouten Islands
- Danis drucei
- Danis ekeikei Bethune-Baker, 1908 New Guinea
- Danis esme Grose-Smith, 1894 New Britain
- Danis glaucopis Grose-Smith, 1894
- Danis hamilcar Grose-Smith, 1894 New Britain
- Danis hanno Grose-Smith, 1894 New Britain
- Danis helga Grose-Smith, 1898 Jobi
- Danis hengis Grose-Smith, 1897 New Guinea
- Danis hermes Grose-Smith, 1894 New Guinea
- Danis hermogenes = Danis wallacei ssp. hermogenes Fruhstorfer, 1915
- Danis herophilus = Danis danis ssp. herophilus Fruhstorfer, 1915 Waigeu
- Danis horsa Grose-Smith, 1898 Ron Island Geelvink Channel
- Danis intermedius Röber
- Danis irregularis Ribbe, 1899
- Danis karpaia Druce
- Danis lampros Druce, 1897 Trobriand Islands
- Danis lamprosides Grose-Smith, 1898 Trobriand Islands
- Danis latifascia = Danis danis latifascia (Rothschild, 1915) Admiralty Islands
- Danis lona Röber, 1927 Waigeu
- Danis lygia
- Danis mamberanano Joicey & Talbot, 1916 New Guinea (River Mamberano, Dutch New Guinea)
- Danis manto Grose-Smith & Kirby, 1896 New Guinea
- Danis melimnos H. H. Druce and Bethune-Baker, 1893
- Danis metrophanes = Danis wallacei ssp. metrophanes Fruhstorfer, 1915 New Guinea
- Danis moutoni = Danis hanno ssp. moutoni Ribbe, 1899
- Danis occidentalis = Danis danis occidentalis (Röber, 1926)
- Danis olga Grose-Smith, 1808 New Guinea
- Danis oribasius = Danis perpheres ssp. oribastus Fruhstorfer, 1915
- Danis panatius = Danis danis ssp. panatius Fruhstorfer, 1915
- Danis peri Grose-Smith, 1894 New Guinea
- Danis philocrates = Danis danis ssp. philocrates Fruhstorfer, 1915 Obi Islands
- Danis phoibides = Danis danis ssp. phoibides Fruhstorfer, 1915 Mefor
- Danis phroso Grose-Smith, 1897 New Guinea
- Danis piepersi Snellen, 1878 Celebes, Banggai Islands, Sula Islands
- Danis plateni Grose-Smith & Kirby, 1896 Waigeu
- Danis plotinus Grose-Smith & Kirby, 1896
- Danis proedrus = Danis danis ssp. proedrus Fruhstorfer, 1915
- Danis pseudochrania Röber
- Danis pseudochromia = Danis hamilcar ssp. pseudochromia Ribbe, 1899 = Nacaduba cyanea hamilcar Grose-Smith, 1894
- Danis regalis
- Danis reverdini Fruhstorfer, 1915 Cape York Peninsula
- Danis rosselana Bethune-Baker, 1908 Rossel Island
- Danis sakitatus = Danis piepersi ssp. sakitatus Ribbe, 1926 Celebes
- Danis salamandri Semper
- Danis scarpheia = Danis melimnos ssp. scarpheia Fruhstorfer, 1915
- Danis schaeffera (Eschscholtz, 1821)
- Danis sebae
- Danis smaragdus Grose-Smith
- Danis sophron = Danis danis ssp. sophron Fruhstorfer, 1915 Buru
- Danis soranus = Danis schaeffera ssp. soranus Fruhstorfer, 1915 Halmahera
- Danis stephani Grose-Smith & Kirby, 1896
- Danis subsuleima Strand, 1929 = Danis danis ssp. latifascia Rothschild, 1915
- Danis suleima Grose-Smith, 1898 = Danis danis suleima (Grose-Smith) Louisiade Archipelago
- Danis supous Druce & Bethune-Baker, 1893 Aru Islands
- Danis thinophilus = Dani danis ssp. thinophilus Toxopeus, 1930
- Danis triopus de Nicéville, 1898 Kai Islands
- Danis valestinax = Danis peri ssp. valestinax Fruhstorfer, 1915 = Perpheres perpheres valestinax Fruhstorfer, 1915 New Guinea
- Danis wallacei
- Danis vidua Grose-Smith & Kirby, 1895 Waigeu
- Danis wollastoni Rothschild, 1917 New Guinea
- Danis zainis = Danis wallacei ssp. zainis Fruhstorfer, 1915 New Guinea
- Danis zuleika Grose-Smith, 1898 Louisiade Archipelago
