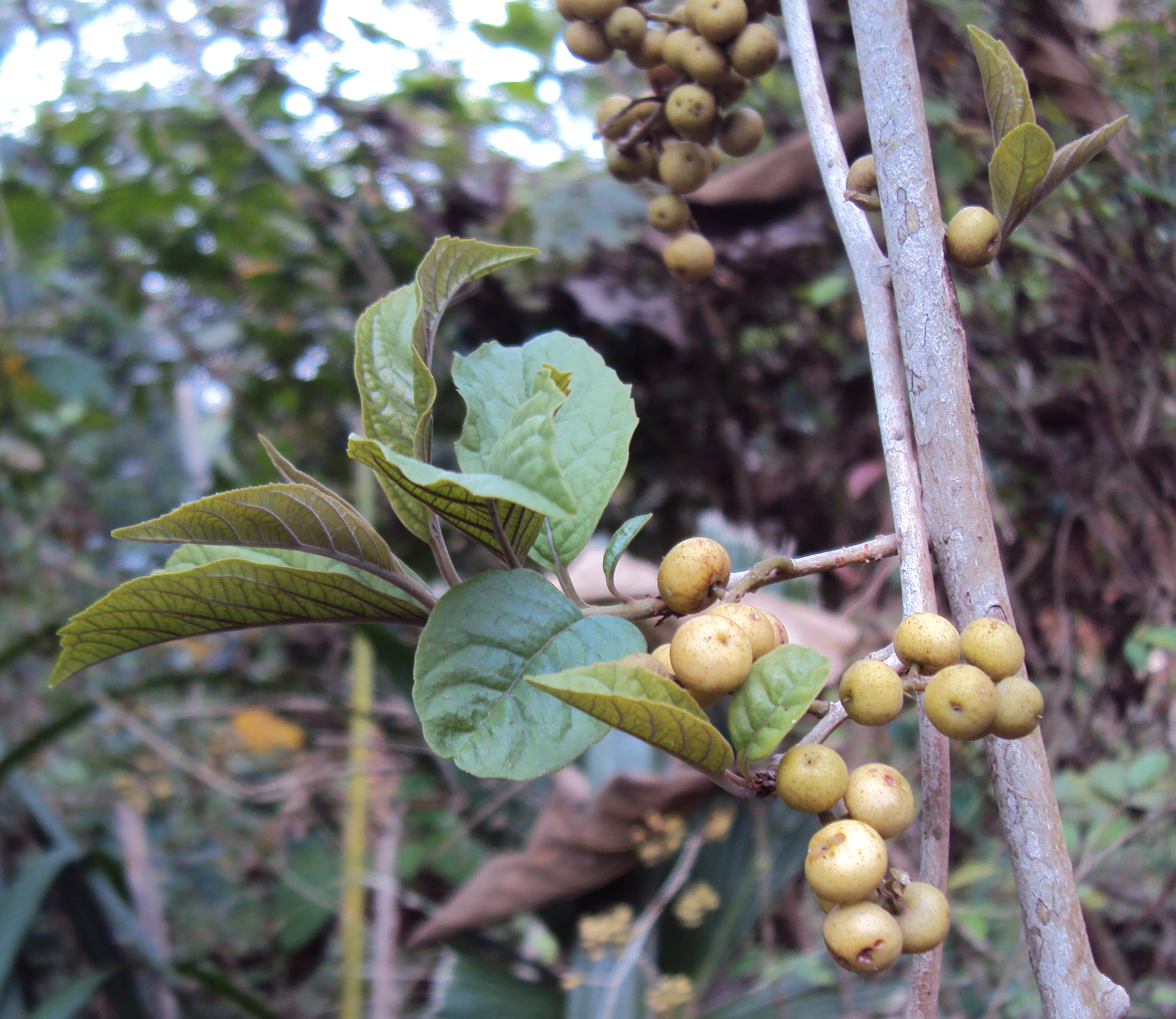

Scientific classification
- Kingdom: Plantae
- Clade: Embryophytes
- Clade: Tracheophytes
- Clade: Spermatophytes
- Clade: Angiosperms
- Clade: Eudicots
- Clade: Asterids
- Order: Ericales
- Family: Primulaceae
- Genus: Embelia
- Species: E. tsjeriam-cottam

Binomial name
- Embelia tsjeriam-cottam (Roem. & Schult.) A.DC.

= Embelia tsjeriam-cottam =

Species of flowering plant

Embelia tsjeriam-cottam, commonly known as vidanga, bhasmaka, krimighna, or vaivilangam is a species in the family Primulaceae.

== Distribution ==
Its native distribution extends from the Indian Subcontinent through South-Central China to Indo-China. In India, it occurs across the western and southern states, including Maharashtra, Goa, Karnataka, Kerala, Tamil Nadu, and Andhra Pradesh.

== Phenology ==
Flowering occurs during February and March, while fruiting begins in April and lasts until July.

== Uses ==
The dried berries are primarily used in medicine; they are acrid, astringent, and carminative, making them beneficial in treating constipation, colic, indigestion, flatulence, and piles. Additionally, a seed paste is applied externally to manage ringworm and other skin infections. The berries are abundant in quinones such as embelin, rapanone, homoembelin, himorapanone, and vilangin. Embelin has been reported to exhibit anti-inflammatory properties.
