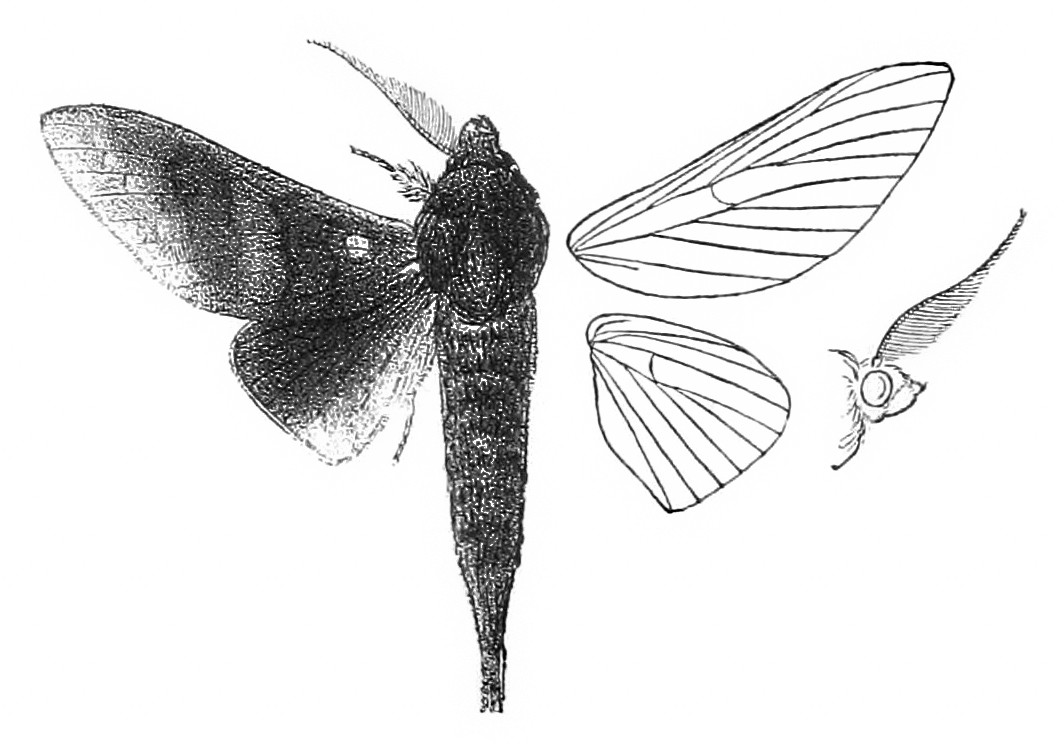
- Suana concolor

Scientific classification
- Kingdom: Animalia
- Phylum: Arthropoda
- Class: Insecta
- Order: Lepidoptera
- Family: Lasiocampidae
- Subfamily: Lasiocampinae
- Tribe: Pinarini
- Genus: Suana; Walker, 1855

= Suana =

Genus of moths

Suana is a genus of moths in the family Lasiocampidae. The genus was erected by Francis Walker in 1855.

== Description ==
Palpi long and broad. Antennae with branches gradually shortening to apex in male, which is extremely short throughout in female. Legs without spurs. Forewing long and narrow. Veins 6, 7 and 8 are stalked. Stalk of veins 9 and 10 are long. Hindwings with straight outer margin in males. Veins 4 and 5 stalked or from angle of cell. Vein 8 almost touching vein 7. One slightly accessory costal veinlet present.

== Species ==
- Suana concolor Walker, 1855
- Suana riemsdyki Heylaerts, 1889
- Suana zahmi Holloway & Bender, 1990
