= Cineromycin B =

Names
- IUPAC name (3Z,5R,6Z,8S,9Z,13S,14R)-5,8-dihydroxy-5,9,13,14-tetramethyl-1-oxacyclotetradeca-3,6,9-trien-2-one

Identifiers
CAS Number	11033-23-1
3D model (JSmol)	Interactive image
ChemSpider	4948482
PubChem CID	6444600
- InChI: InChI=1S/C17H26O4/c1-12-6-5-7-13(2)15(18)8-10-17(4,20)11-9-16(19)21-14(12)3/h7-12,14-15,18,20H,5-6H2,1-4H3/b10-8-,11-9-,13-7-/t12-,14+,15-,17+/m0/s1 Key: RLNOIXQIRICASI-HTNMZXOESA-N
- SMILES: C[C@H]1CC/C=C(\[C@H](/C=C\[C@@](/C=C\C(=O)O[C@@H]1C)(C)O)O)/C

Properties
Chemical formula	C_{17}H_{26}O_{4}
Molar mass	294.391 g·mol^{−1}
- Except where otherwise noted, data are given for materials in their standard state (at 25 °C [77 °F], 100 kPa). Infobox references

Cineromycin B is an antiadipogenic antibiotic with the molecular formula C_{17}H_{26}O_{4} which is produced by the bacterium Streptomyces cinerochromogenes.
