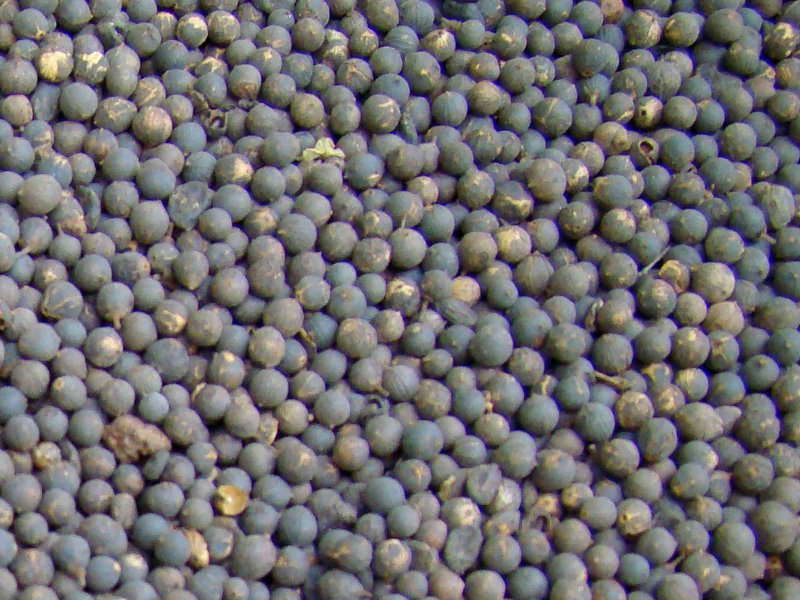
- Embelia ribes seeds
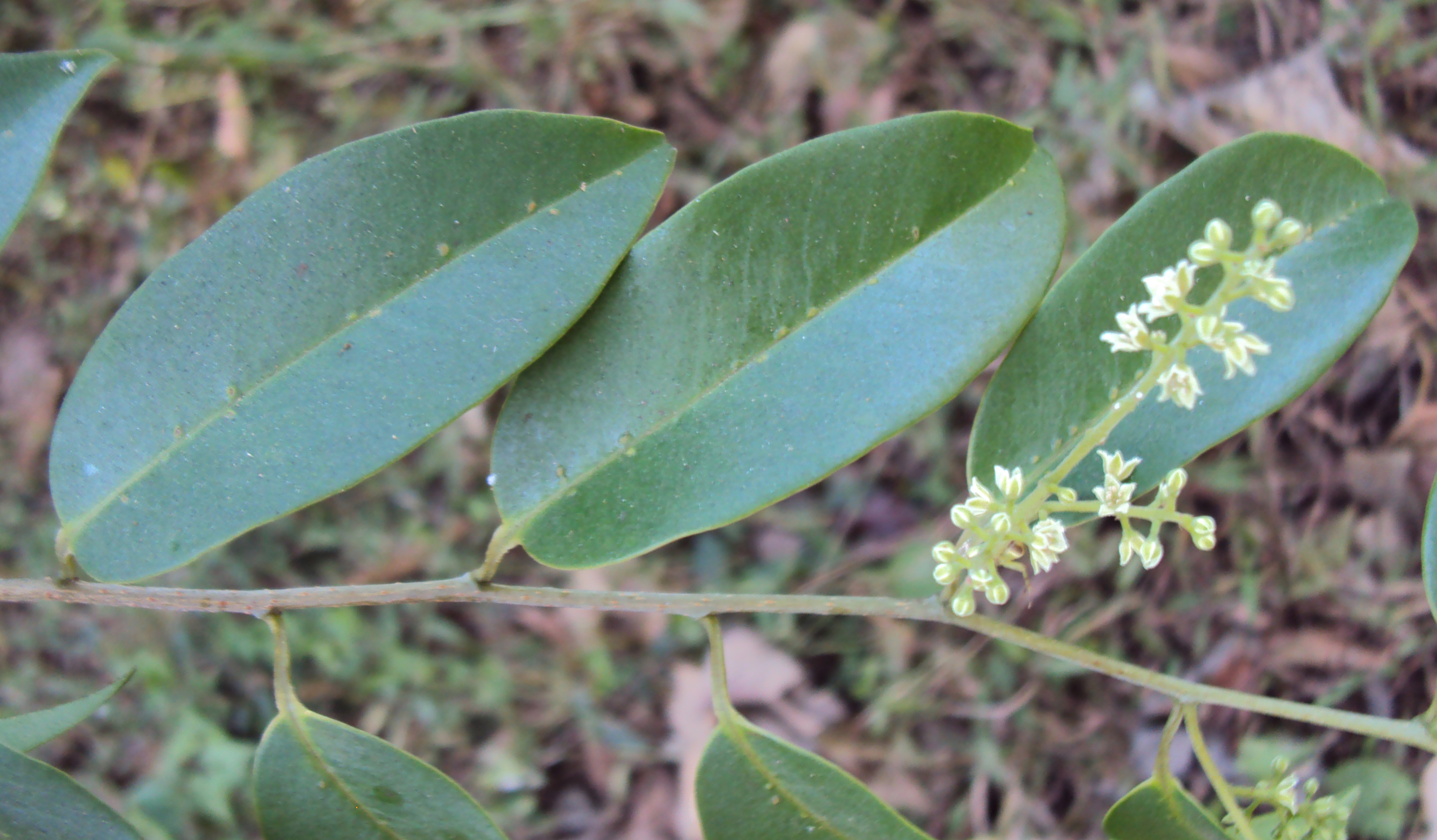
- Flowers and leaves

Scientific classification
- Kingdom: Plantae
- Clade: Tracheophytes
- Clade: Angiosperms
- Clade: Eudicots
- Clade: Asterids
- Order: Ericales
- Family: Primulaceae
- Genus: Embelia
- Species: E. ribes

Binomial name
- Embelia ribes Burm.f.

= Embelia ribes =

Species of flowering plant

Embelia ribes, commonly known as false black pepper, white-flowered embelia, viḍaṅga (Sanskrit: विडङ्ग), vaividang, vai vidang, or vavding is a species of flowering plant in the family Primulaceae. It was originally described by Nicolaas Laurens Burman in his 1768 publication Flora Indica. It is widely distributed throughout India. In Cambodia, it is called Chu Preuk or Sangkong [ជូរព្រឹក/សង្កុង). In Ayurveda and Siddha, it is considered widely beneficial in a variety of diseases In particular embelin isolated from dried berries of Embelia ribes has a wide spectrum of biological activities.

== Uses ==
Embelia ribes has been used in traditional medicine to treat:

- Intestinal worms. Used to treat various types of worm infestation in the gut.
- Indigestion. Helps with digestive issues like vomiting, nausea and constipation.
- Depression. Embelia ribes has antidepressant effects and is used to treat depression.
- Throat infection. Effective in reducing cough and treating throat infections.
- Obesity. Aids in weight loss and helps remove body toxins.
- Skin disease. Used to treat skin diseases by purifying the blood.
