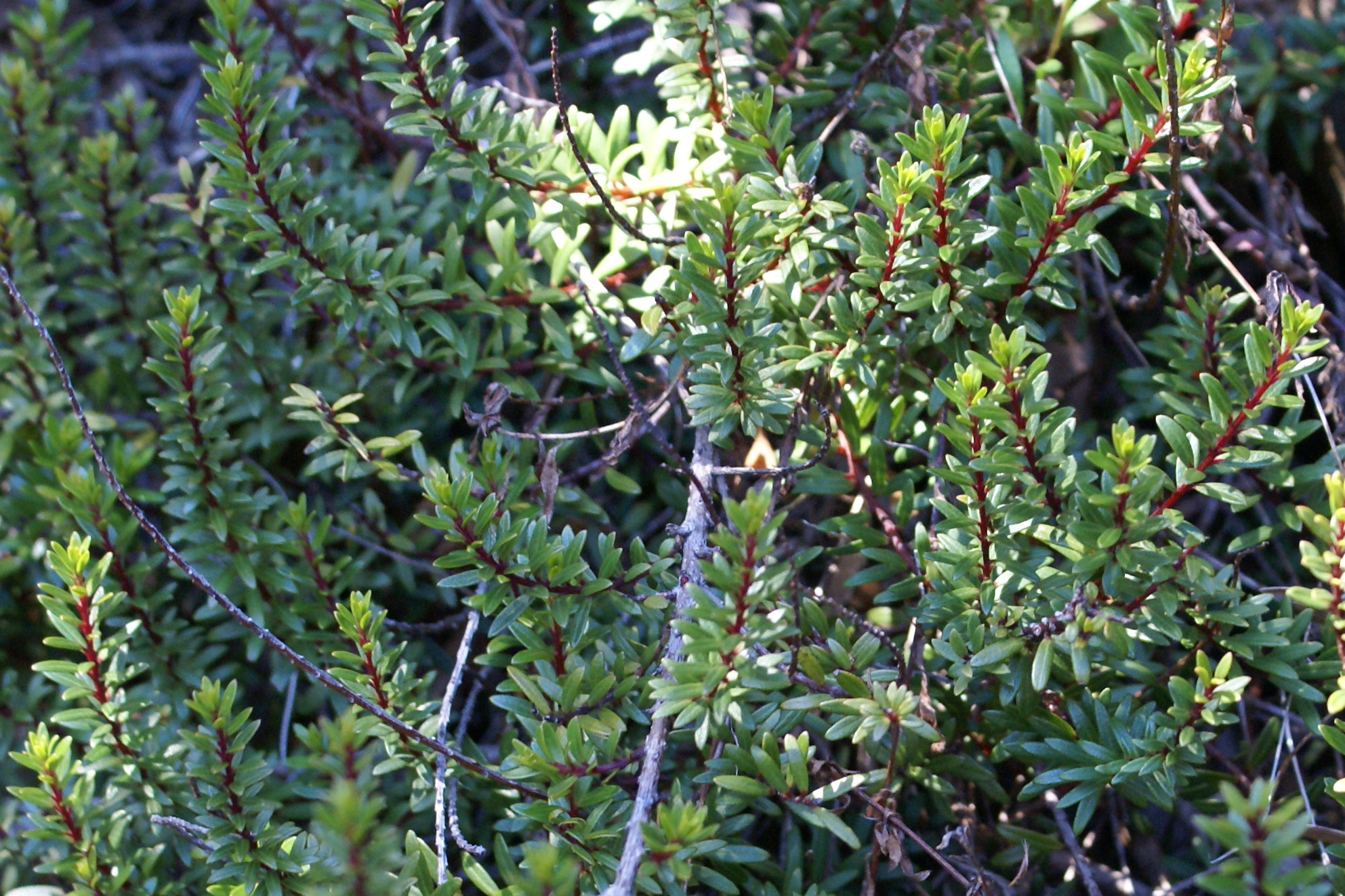
- Embelia demissa

Scientific classification
- Kingdom: Plantae
- Clade: Embryophytes
- Clade: Tracheophytes
- Clade: Angiosperms
- Clade: Eudicots
- Clade: Asterids
- Order: Ericales
- Family: Primulaceae
- Subfamily: Myrsinoideae
- Genus: Embelia; Burm.f.

Species
- See text

Synonyms
- Ribesiodes Kuntze; Samara L.

= Embelia =

Genus of flowering plants

Embelia is a genus of climbing shrubs once placed in the family Myrsinaceae, which is now included in the Primulaceae. There are about 130 species which occur in tropical and subtropical areas across a wide range including Africa and Madagascar and from eastern Asia to the Pacific Islands as well as Australia including:

- Embelia angustifolia (A. DC.) A. DC.
- Embelia australiana (F.Muell.) F.M.Bailey - native to New South Wales and Queensland in Australia
- Embelia basaal (Roem. & Schult.) A. DC.
- Embelia beccariana (Mez) Dubéarnès, Julius & Utteridge
- Embelia biflora Mez
- Embelia boivinii Mez
- Embelia caulialata S.T.Reynolds
- Embelia clarkei Bedd. & Mez
- Embelia comorensis Mez
- Embelia corymbifera Mez
- Embelia curvinervia S.T.Reynolds
- Embelia demissa Cordem.
- Embelia disticha Fletcher
- Embelia effusa Mez
- Embelia floribunda Wall.
- Embelia frangulifolia (Span. ex Miq.) Mez
- Embelia fulva Mez
- Embelia grandifolia Fletcher
- Embelia grayi S.T.Reynolds
- Embelia incumbens Mez
- Embelia laeta (L.) Mez.
- Embelia longifolia (Benth.) Hemsl.
- Embelia macrocarpa King & Gamble
- Embelia myriantha Mez
- Embelia rowlandii Gilg
- Embelia oblongifolia Hemsl.
- Embelia obtusiuscula Mez
- Embelia palauensis Mez
- Embelia penangiana (Oliv.) Mez
- Embelia polypodioides Mez
- Embelia pulchella Mez.
- Embelia pyrifolia (Willd. ex Roem. & Schult.) Mez
- Embelia retata Mez
- Embelia reticulata (A.DC.) Wall. ex Mez
- Embelia ribes Burm. f. - false black pepper, white-flowered embelia
- Embelia rigida Mez
- Embelia ruminata (E.Mey. ex A.DC.) Mez
- Embelia sarasinorum Mez
- Embelia schimperi Vatke
- Embelia scandens (Lour.) Mez
- Embelia sessiliflora Kurz.
- Embelia subcoriacea (C.B.Clarke) Mez
- Embelia tsjeriam-cottam (Roem. & Schult.) A. DC.
- Embelia vaupelii Mez
- Embelia zollingeri Mez
