= Embelin =

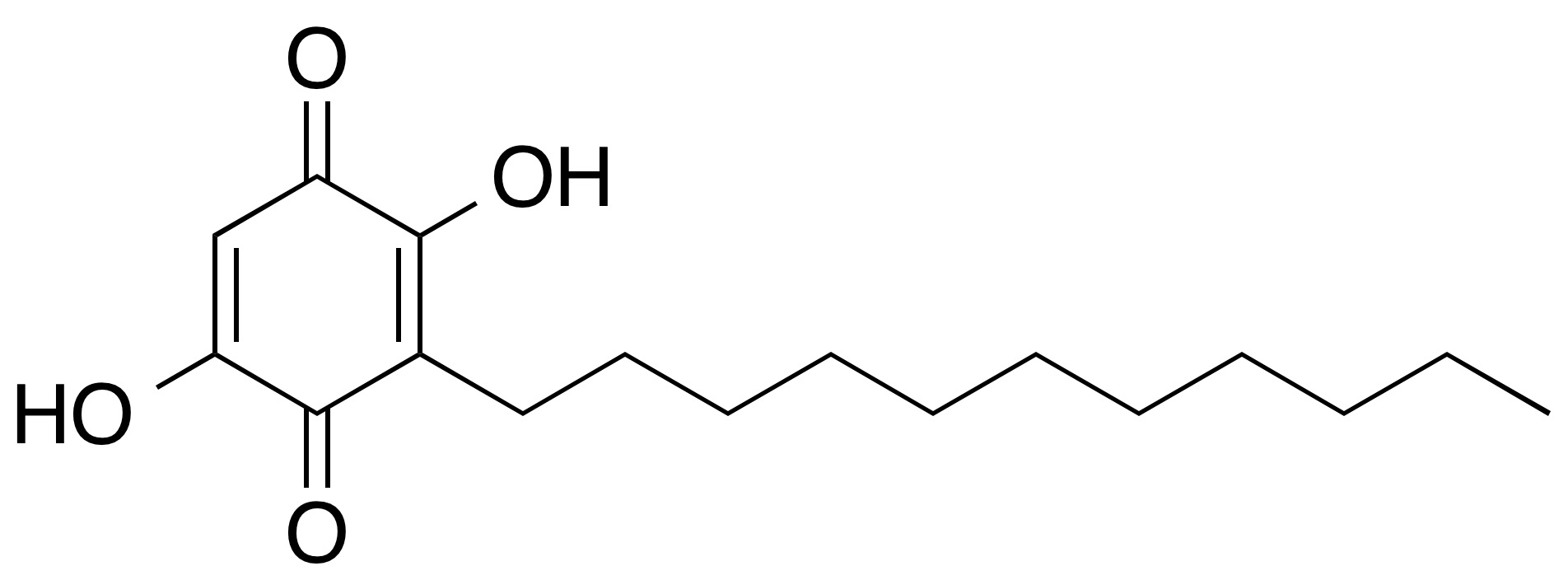

Names
- Preferred IUPAC name 2,5-Dihydroxy-3-undecylcyclohexa-2,5-diene-1,4-dione
- Other names Embelic acid, Emberine

Identifiers
CAS Number	550-24-3
3D model (JSmol)	Interactive image
ChEBI	CHEBI:4778
ChEMBL	ChEMBL221137
ChemSpider	3105
ECHA InfoCard	100.008.164
EC Number	208-979-8
KEGG	C10342
PubChem CID	3218
UNII	SHC6U8F5ER
CompTox Dashboard (EPA)	DTXSID80203537
- InChI: InChI=1S/C17H26O4/c1-2-3-4-5-6-7-8-9-10-11-13-16(20)14(18)12-15(19)17(13)21/h12,18,21H,2-11H2,1H3 Key: IRSFLDGTOHBADP-UHFFFAOYSA-N
- SMILES: CCCCCCCCCCCC1=C(C(=O)C=C(C1=O)O)O

Properties
Chemical formula	C_{17}H_{26}O_{4}
Molar mass	294.391 g·mol^{−1}

Hazards
- GHS labelling
Pictograms	(GHS07: Exclamation mark)
Signal word	Warning
Hazard statements	H361
Precautionary statements	P201, P202, P281, P308+P313, P405, P501

Related compounds
Related compounds	Rapanone
- Except where otherwise noted, data are given for materials in their standard state (at 25 °C [77 °F], 100 kPa). Infobox references

Embelin, also known as 2,5-dihydroxy-3-undecyl-1,4-benzoquinone, is a naturally occurring para-benzoquinone isolated from dried berries of Embelia ribes plants. Several studies have reported antidiabetic activity of embelin. Embelin is known to act as a highly potent and selective GPR84 agonist. It has been found to produce pro-inflammatory effects and cognitive impairment in rodents.

== See also ==
- Idebenone
- Ubiquinone
- Utreloxastat
