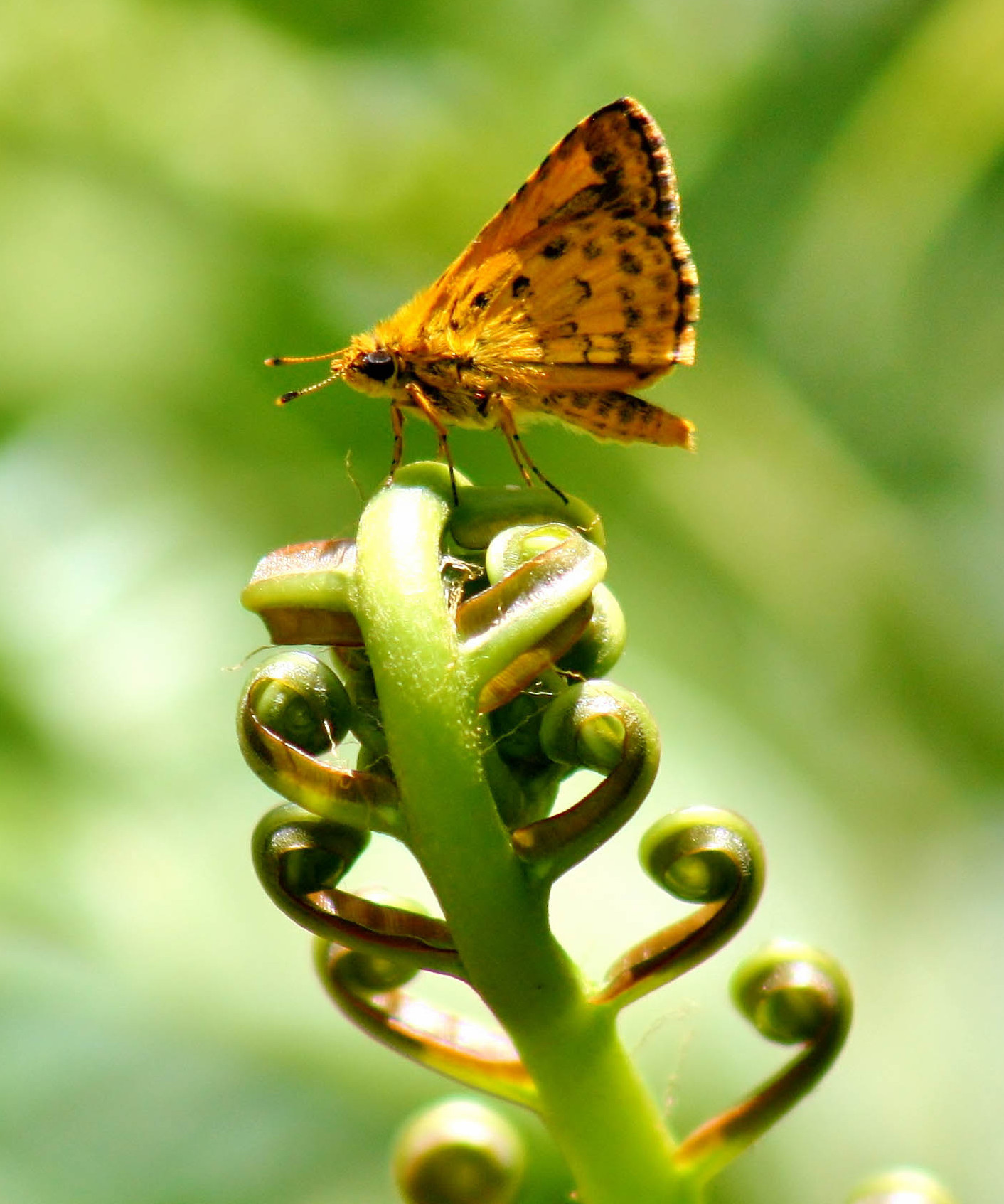
- Ampittia dioscorides etura

Scientific classification
- Kingdom: Animalia
- Phylum: Arthropoda
- Clade: Pancrustacea
- Class: Insecta
- Order: Lepidoptera
- Family: Hesperiidae
- Subfamily: Hesperiinae
- Tribe: Aeromachini; Tutt, 1906
- Genus: Ampittia; Moore, 1882

Species
- 10, see text

= Ampittia =

Genus of butterflies

Ampittia is the genus of bush hoppers in the skipper butterfly family, Hesperiidae. It is the only member of the tribe Ampittiini.

== Species ==
- Ampittia capenas (Hewitson, 1868) – African bush hopper
- Ampittia dioscorides (Fabricius, 1793) – (common) bush hopper
- Ampittia kilombero T.B. Larsen & Congdon, 2012
- Ampittia maroides de Nicéville, [1896]
- Ampittia parva Aurivillius, 1925
- Ampittia sichunanensis Z.G. Wang & Y. Niu, 2002
- Ampittia trimacula (Leech, 1891)
- Ampittia tristella Shou, Chou & Li, 2006
- Ampittia virgata (Leech, 1890)
  - Ampittia virgata miyakei Matsumura, 1910

For Ampittia dalailama (Mabille, 1876) & Ampittia nanus (Leech, 1890) see Aeromachus, after Huang et al. 2019.
