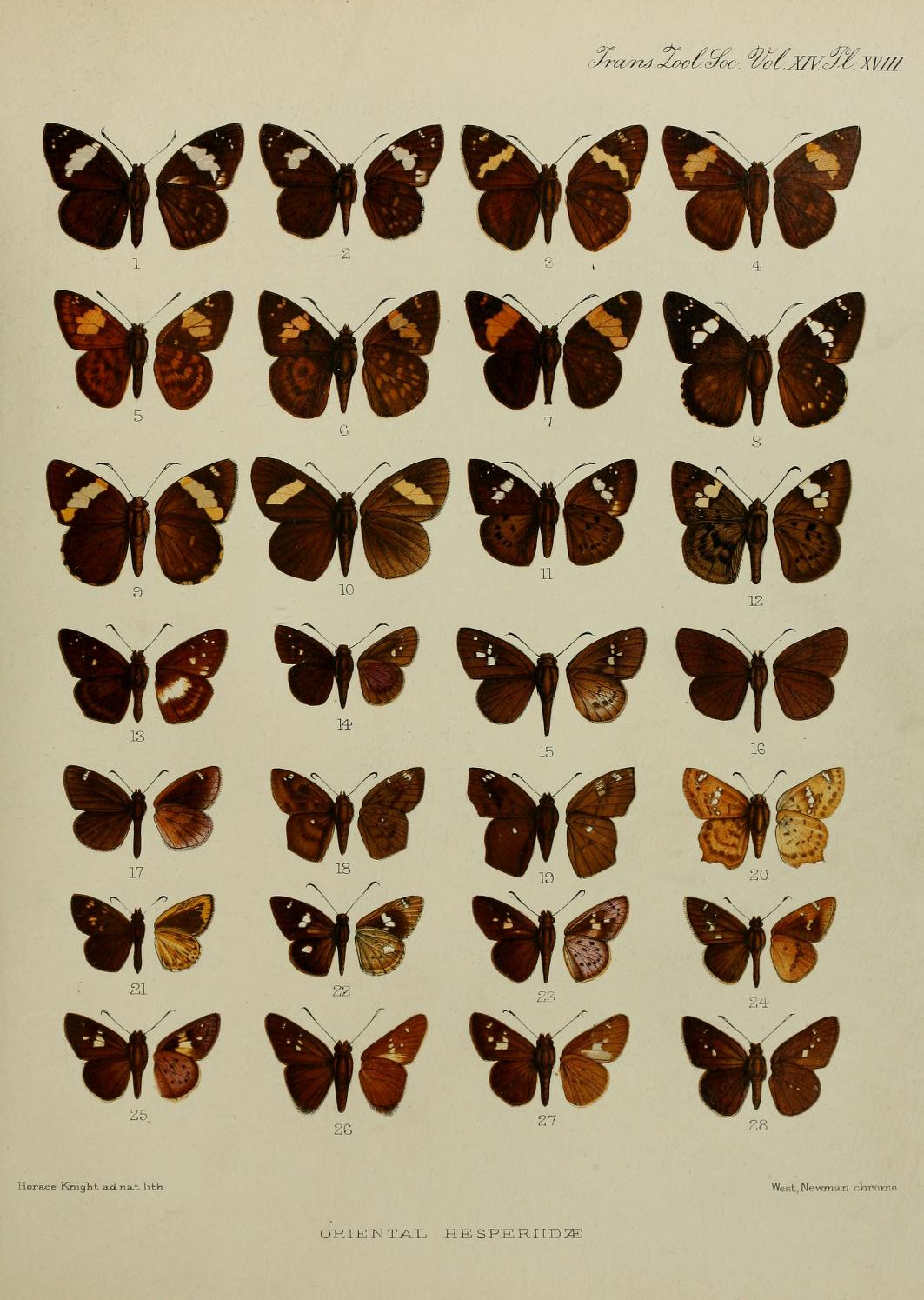
- Baracus vittatus hampsoni (figure 21)

Scientific classification
- Kingdom: Animalia
- Phylum: Arthropoda
- Class: Insecta
- Order: Lepidoptera
- Family: Hesperiidae
- Subfamily: Hesperiinae
- Tribe: Aeromachini
- Genus: Baracus

= Baracus =

Genus of butterflies

Baracus is a monotypic genus of grass skippers in the family Hesperiidae.

== Species ==
- Baracus vittatus (Felder, 1862)
