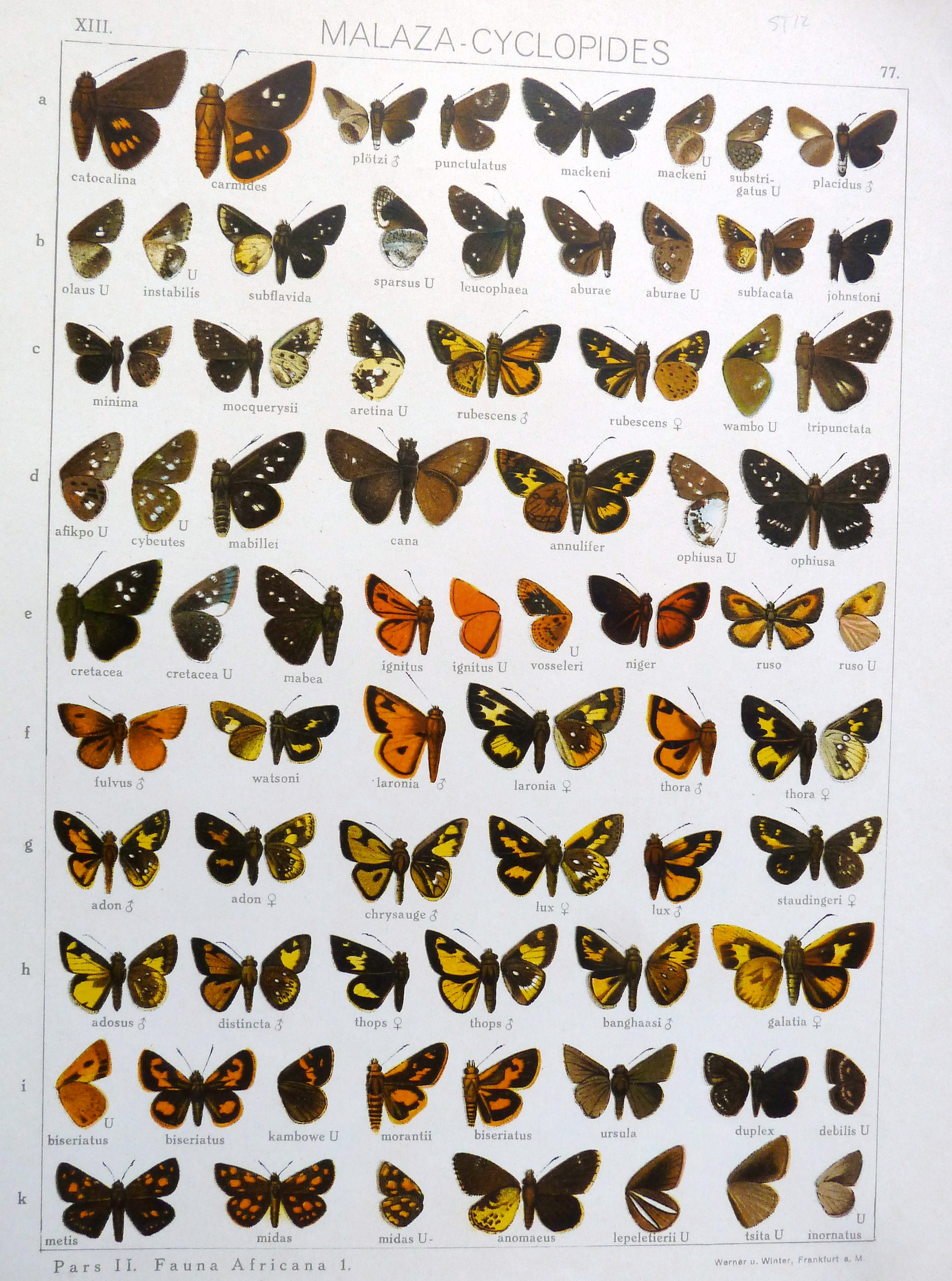
- k

Scientific classification
- Kingdom: Animalia
- Phylum: Arthropoda
- Class: Insecta
- Order: Lepidoptera
- Family: Hesperiidae
- Tribe: Aeromachini
- Genus: Lepella; Evans, 1937
- Species: L. lepeletier

Binomial name
- Lepella lepeletier (Latreille, [1824])

Synonyms
- Hesperia lepeletier Latreille, 1824; Cyclopides africanus Mabille; Plötz, 1884; Cyclopides romi Robbe, 1892

= Lepella =

Genus of butterflies

Lepella is a genus of skippers in the family Hesperiidae. It consists of only one species, Lepella lepeletier, commonly known as Lepeletier's sylph, which is found in eastern Nigeria, Cameroon, Gabon, Angola, the Democratic Republic of the Congo, Sudan, Uganda, western Kenya, western Tanzania and north-western Zambia. The habitat consists of submontane grassland.

The larvae feed on Poaceae species.
