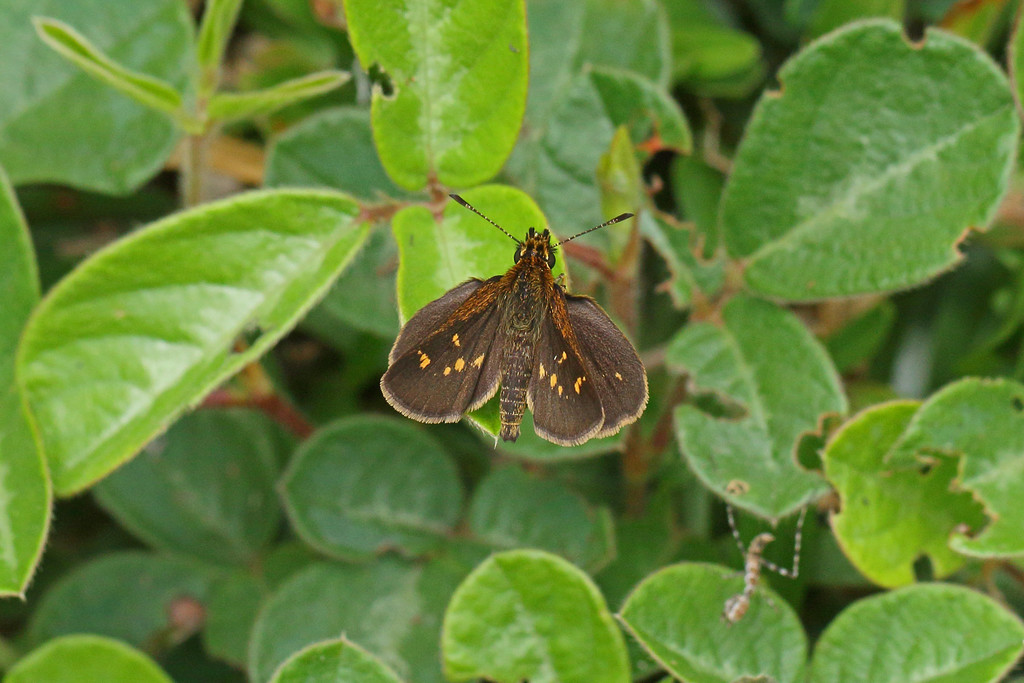

Scientific classification
- Domain: Eukaryota
- Kingdom: Animalia
- Phylum: Arthropoda
- Class: Insecta
- Order: Lepidoptera
- Family: Hesperiidae
- Genus: Arnetta
- Species: A. ellipsis

Binomial name
- Arnetta ellipsis (Saalmüller, 1884)

Synonyms
- Hesperia ellipsis Saalmüller, 1884; Arnetta (Galerga) ellipsis; Cyclopides mirza Mabille, 1887; Cyclopides idis Oberthür, 1916

= Arnetta ellipsis =

Species of butterfly

Arnetta ellipsis is a species of butterfly in the family Hesperiidae. It is found in northern, central and eastern Madagascar. The habitat consists of forest margins, cleared forests and anthropogenic environments.
