= Arnetta fito =

Scientific classification
- Domain: Eukaryota
- Kingdom: Animalia
- Phylum: Arthropoda
- Class: Insecta
- Order: Lepidoptera
- Family: Hesperiidae
- Genus: Arnetta
- Species: A. fito

Binomial name
- Arnetta fito Evans, 1937

Synonyms
- Arnetta (Galerga) fito

Species of butterfly

Arnetta fito is a species of butterfly in the family Hesperiidae. It is found on Madagascar. The habitat consists of forests.
