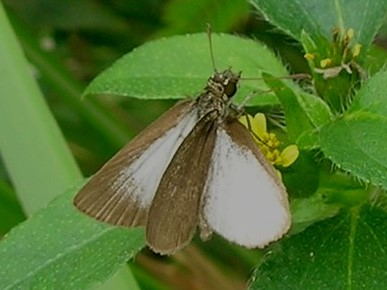

Scientific classification
- Kingdom: Animalia
- Phylum: Arthropoda
- Class: Insecta
- Order: Lepidoptera
- Family: Hesperiidae
- Genus: Aeromachus
- Species: A. plumbeola

Binomial name
- Aeromachus plumbeola (C. & R. Felder, 1867)

Synonyms
- Hesperia plumbeola C. & R. Felder, 1867; Aeromachus plumbeolus

= Aeromachus plumbeola =

Species of butterfly

Aeromachus plumbeola is a species of butterfly in the family Hesperiidae. It is found in the Philippines and southern India. It is only half the size of Baracus vittatus, otherwise similar above, in the forewing the basal half (male) or one third (female) is silvery grey (plumbeus), the under surface dusty grey with a brownish tint and lighter small longitudinal spots and rays. Philippines.
