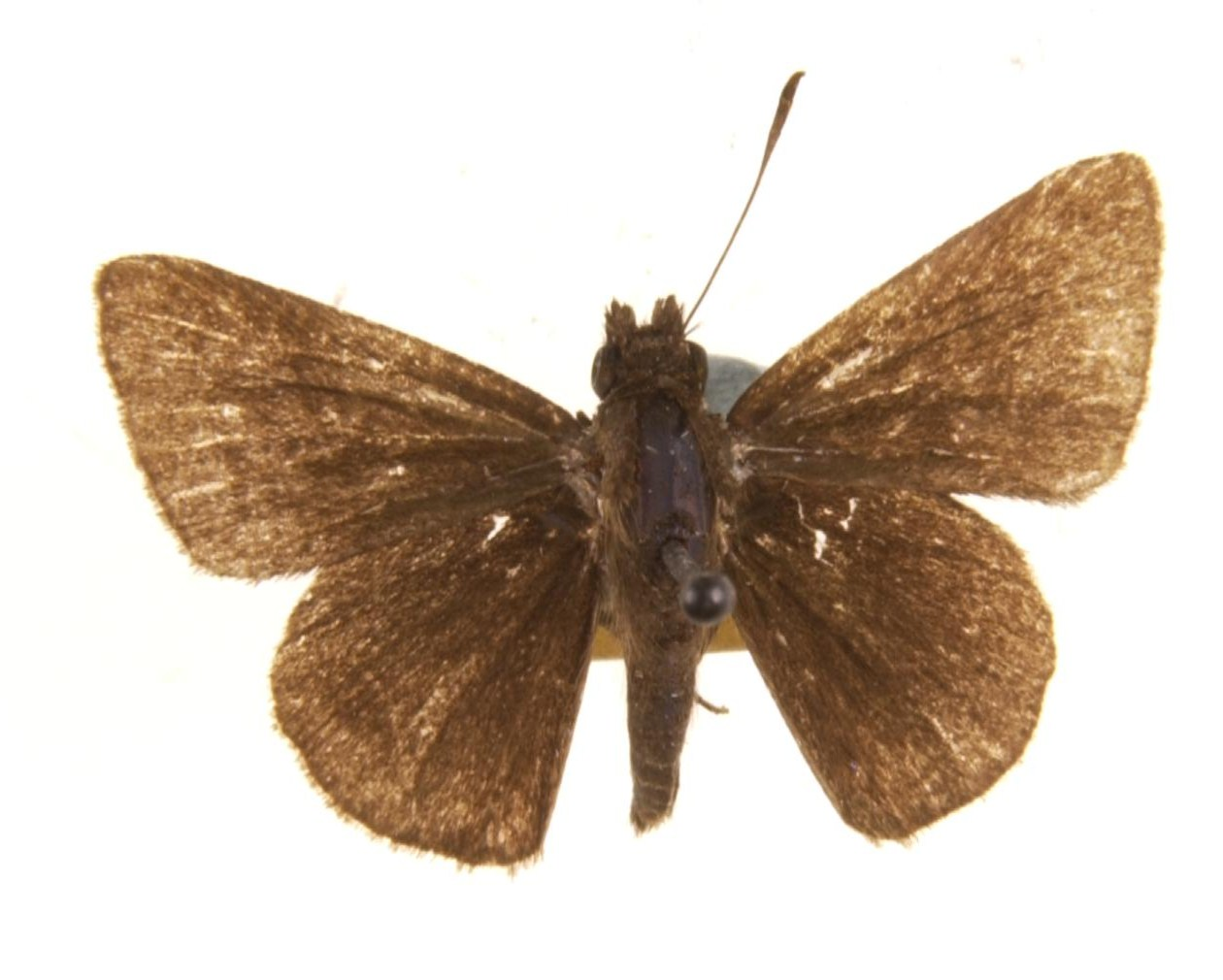
- Worn museum specimen from Malaya
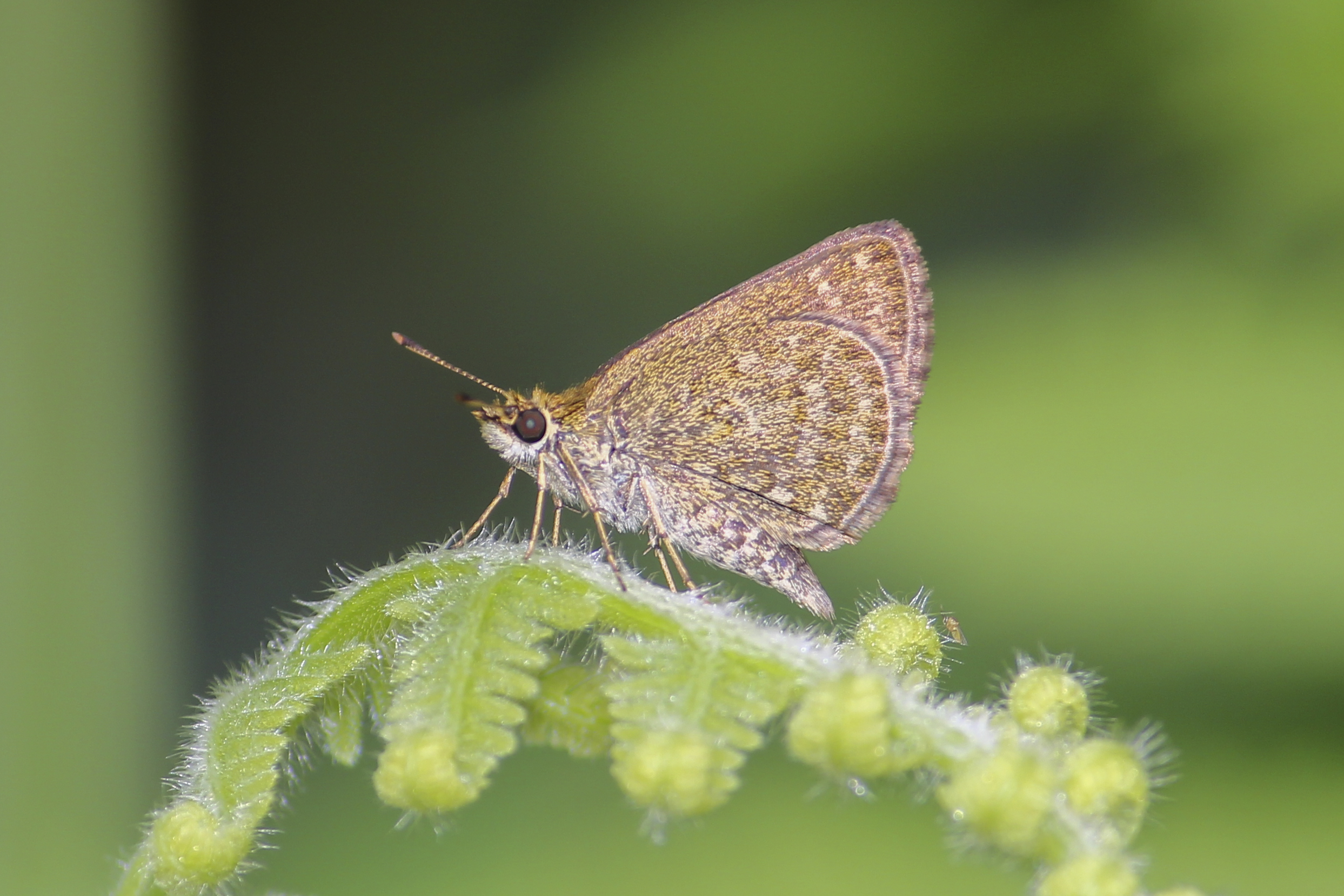

Scientific classification
- Kingdom: Animalia
- Phylum: Arthropoda
- Class: Insecta
- Order: Lepidoptera
- Family: Hesperiidae
- Genus: Aeromachus
- Species: A. jhora

Binomial name
- Aeromachus jhora de Nicéville, 1885

= Aeromachus jhora =

Species of butterfly

Aeromachus jhora is a species of skipper butterfly found in Asia (Vietnam and Assam to Malaya)

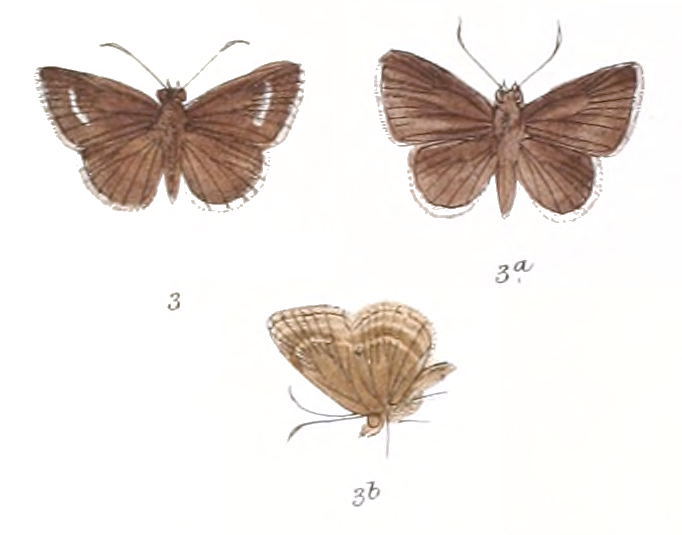

== Description ==
Upperside dark brown; cilia whitish marked with brown at the end of the nervules. Forewing with a discal curved series of about six pale dots. Hindwing unmarked. Underside dark brown, the costa and the apex of the forewing and the entire hindwing greenish-ochreous, Forewing with the discal series of spots as above, and an indistinct marginal lunular series. Hindwing with a very irregular discal series of spots and an obscure marginal series.

— Edward Yerbury Watson

Wing expanse of 0.95 to 1.05 inches (24 to 27 mm).
