= Ampittia kilombero =

Scientific classification
- Domain: Eukaryota
- Kingdom: Animalia
- Phylum: Arthropoda
- Class: Insecta
- Order: Lepidoptera
- Family: Hesperiidae
- Genus: Ampittia
- Species: A. kilombero

Binomial name
- Ampittia kilombero T.B. Larsen & Congdon, 2012

Species of butterfly

Ampittia kilombero is a species of butterfly in the family Hesperiidae. It is found in the Kilombero Valley, Tanzania.
