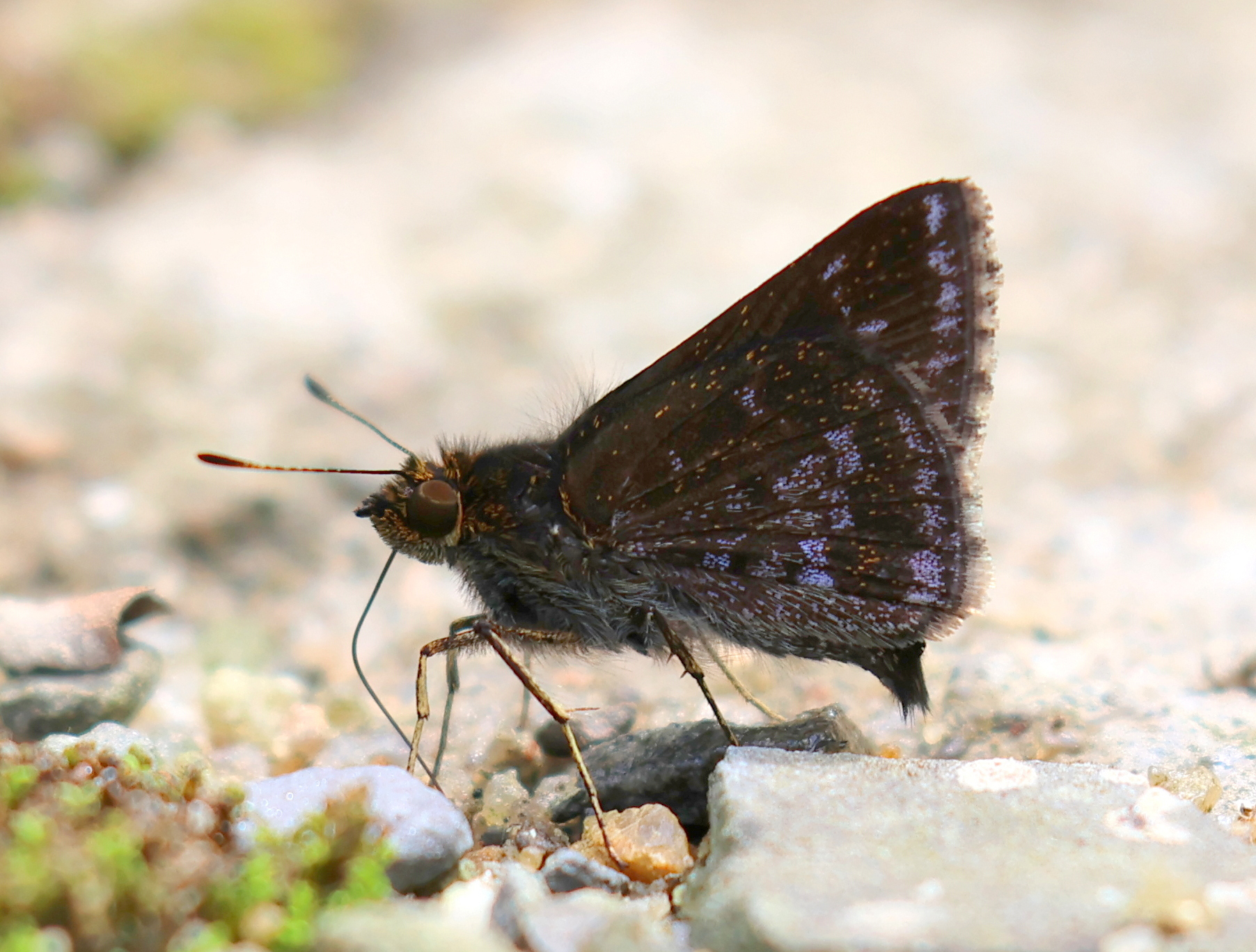

Scientific classification
- Kingdom: Animalia
- Phylum: Arthropoda
- Class: Insecta
- Order: Lepidoptera
- Family: Hesperiidae
- Genus: Aeromachus
- Species: A. kali

Binomial name
- Aeromachus kali de Nicéville, 1885

= Aeromachus kali =

Species of butterfly

Aeromachus kali is a species of skipper butterfly found in Asia (Sikkim, Assam, Burma, Laos) and Yunnan.

== Description ==
Male upperside deep purplish black, the cilia cinereous. Underside slightly paler. Forewing with a discal outwardly angled series of eight pale violet-white dots, an even somewhat larger marginal lunular series. Hindwing with a discal irregular series of pale violet-white spots, within which are some obscure pale markings; a marginal series as in the forewing. Cilia cinereous, marked with dark brown at the ends of the nervules.

— Edward Yerbury Watson

Wing expanse of 1.15 inches (29 mm).

It is found in Sikkim, India.
