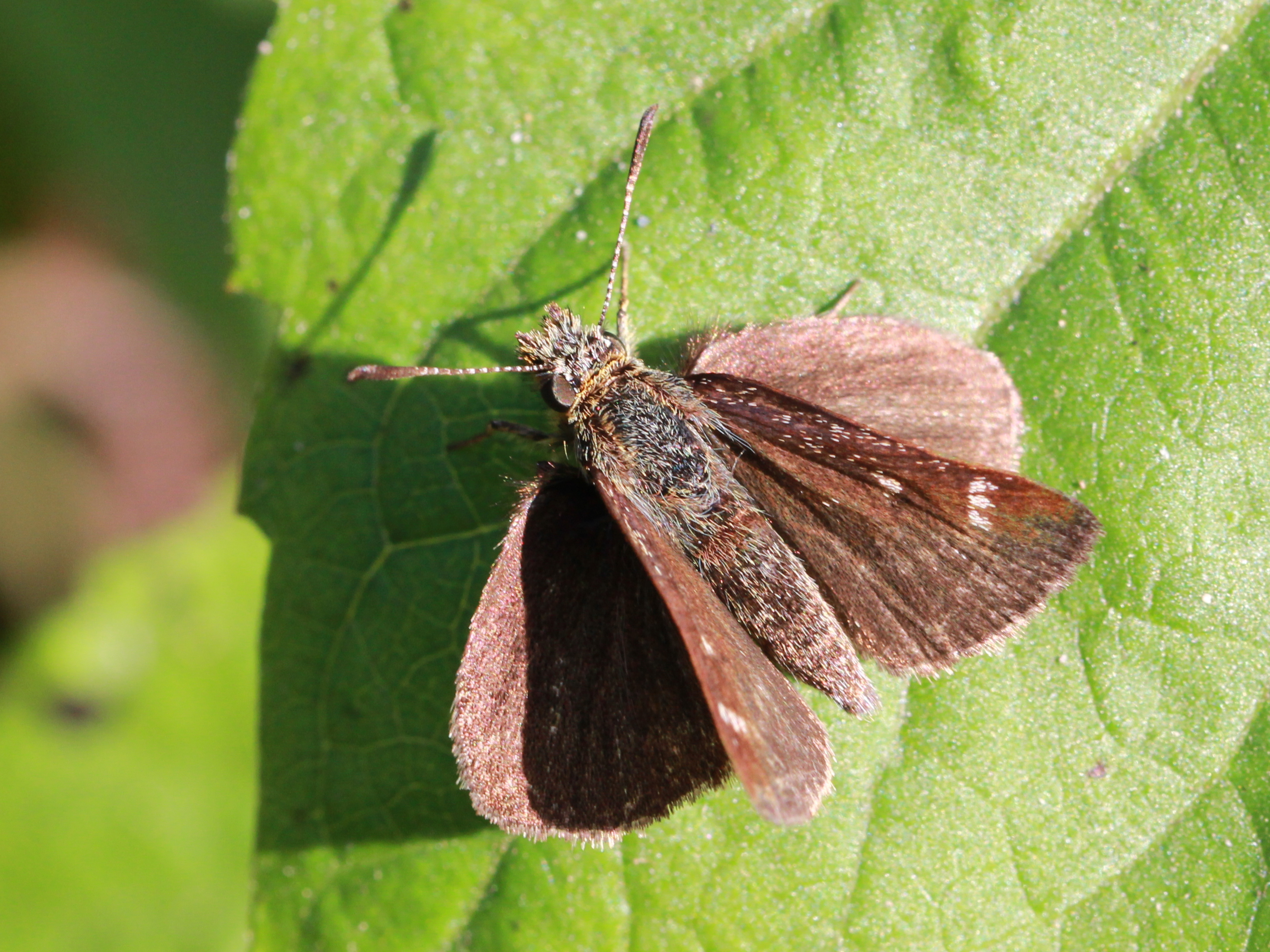

Scientific classification
- Kingdom: Animalia
- Phylum: Arthropoda
- Class: Insecta
- Order: Lepidoptera
- Family: Hesperiidae
- Genus: Aeromachus
- Species: A. dubius

Binomial name
- Aeromachus dubius (Elwes & Edwards, 1897)

= Aeromachus dubius =

Dingy scrub-hopper

Species of butterfly

Aeromachus dubius, the dingy scrub-hopper, is a butterfly belonging to the family Hesperiidae. It ranges from India to China, including Malaya, Assam, Myanmar, Laos, Vietnam, Hainan and Yunnan.

== Description ==
Male. Upperside dark (olive-brown), the post-medial series of spots on the forewing very indistinct or wanting, sex mark on the forewing a small inconspicuous fold of raised scales in cell 1A, next vein 1A near the middle. Underside forewing umber-brown, the apical and costal regions similar to the hindwing, a small pale spot near the upper distal angle of the cell, the post-medial series of pale spots represented by about six spots, which become gradually fainter in their course from cells 8-3, a pale anteciliary line, hindwing ochreous-brown by reason of a close sprinkling of yellow scales on the umber-brown ground, the post-medial and sub-terminal series of pale spots very indistinct or wanting, a pale anteciliary line. Fringes greyish-white, the short scales grey -brown. Antennae above blackish, minutely spotted with yellowish, beneath greyish-yellow, the shaft spotted with black. Second joint of palpi clothed with yellow and black hairs intermixed. Body above concolorous with the wings, beneath with greyish-yellow pubescence. Legs with greyish-yellow scaling. Tegumen (seen from above) with a small rounded projection near the apex on each side, beyond which it is produced in a bluntly rounded triangle. Female differs from the male in wanting the sex mark and in having the pale spots proper to the underside more strongly developed, and consequently the postmedian series appears faintly in the costal portion of the upperside of the forewing.

— Charles Swinhoe, Lepidoptera Indica. Vol. X

The larva (caterpillar) has been recorded on Cyrtococcum trigonum.

== See also ==
- Hesperiidae
- List of butterflies of India (Hesperiinae)
- List of butterflies of India (Hesperiidae)
