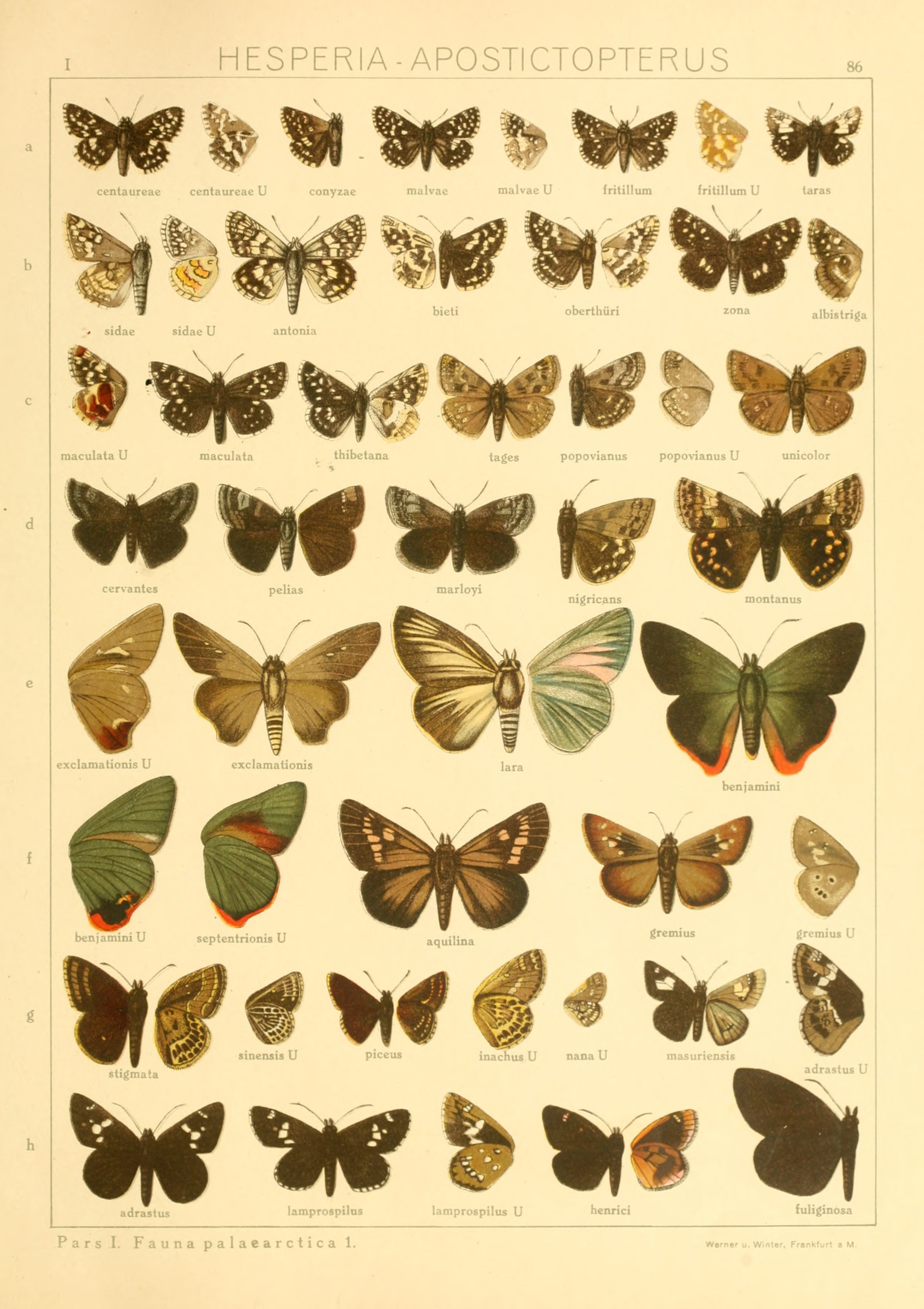
- Aeromachus in Adalbert Seitz's Fauna Palaearctica page 86 line "g"

Scientific classification
- Kingdom: Animalia
- Phylum: Arthropoda
- Class: Insecta
- Order: Lepidoptera
- Family: Hesperiidae
- Subfamily: Hesperiinae
- Tribe: Aeromachini
- Genus: Aeromachus de Nicéville, 1890

= Aeromachus =

Genus of butterflies

Aeromachus is a genus of grass skippers in the family Hesperiidae. The species are known by the common name of scrub hoppers. They are found in the eastern Palearctic and the Indomalayan realm.

Club of antenna of medium thickness, with a short, recurved tip. The second segment of the palpus erect, the third porrect (stretched forward). Vein 5 of forewing midway between 4 and 6. The males have usually a linear stigma on the forewing which extends from vein 3 to 1.

== Species ==
- Aeromachus bandaishanus Murayama & Shimonoya, 1973
- Aeromachus catocyanea (Mabille, 1879) China (Yunnan)
- Aeromachus cognatus Inoue & Kawazoe, 1966 Vietnam
- Aeromachus dalailama (Mabille, 1876)
- Aeromachus dubius Elwes & Edwards, 1897
- Aeromachus inachus (Ménétriés, 1859) Ussuri, Amurland, Taiwan, Japan.
- Aeromachus jhora (de Nicéville, 1885)
- Aeromachus kali (de Nicéville, 1885)
- Aeromachus matsudai Murayama, 1943
- Aeromachus monstrabilus Huang, 2003 Tibet
- Aeromachus muscus (Mabille, 1876)
- Aeromachus nanus (Leech, 1890)
- Aeromachus piceus Leech, 1894 China (Sichuan, Yunnan)
- Aeromachus plumbeola (C. & R. Felder, 1867)
- Aeromachus propinquus Alphéraky, 1897 China (Yunnan)
- Aeromachus pseudojhora Lee, 1962 China (Yunnan)
- Aeromachus pygmaeus (Fabricius, 1775) India (Nilgiris etc to Assam), Myanmar, Thailand
- Aeromachus skola Evans, 1943
- Aeromachus spuria Evans, 1943
- Aeromachus stigmata (Moore, 1878) Pakistan (Punjab), India (Assam), Myanmar, Thailand, Laos, China (Yunnan).
