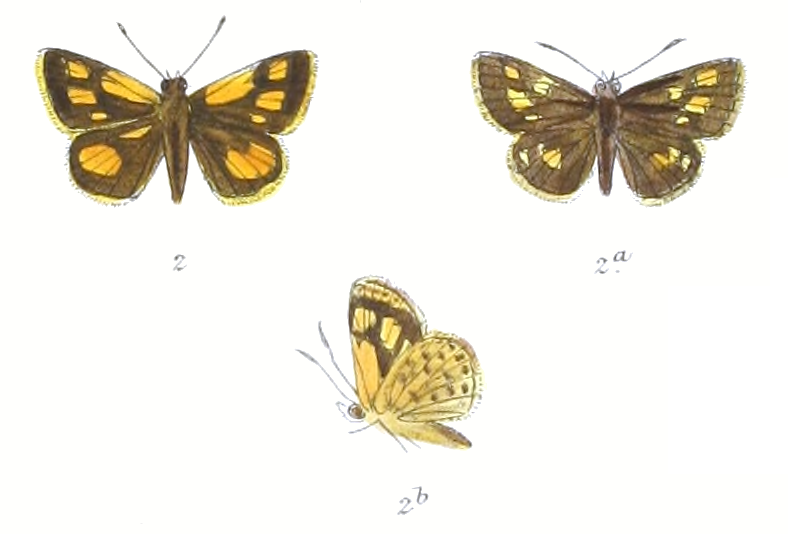

Scientific classification
- Domain: Eukaryota
- Kingdom: Animalia
- Phylum: Arthropoda
- Class: Insecta
- Order: Lepidoptera
- Family: Hesperiidae
- Genus: Ampittia
- Species: A. maroides

Binomial name
- Ampittia maroides de Nicéville, [1896]

= Ampittia maroides =

Species of butterfly

Ampittia maroides is a species of butterfly in the family Hesperiidae. It was described by Lionel de Nicéville in 1896. It is found in Burma, Thailand and Laos.
