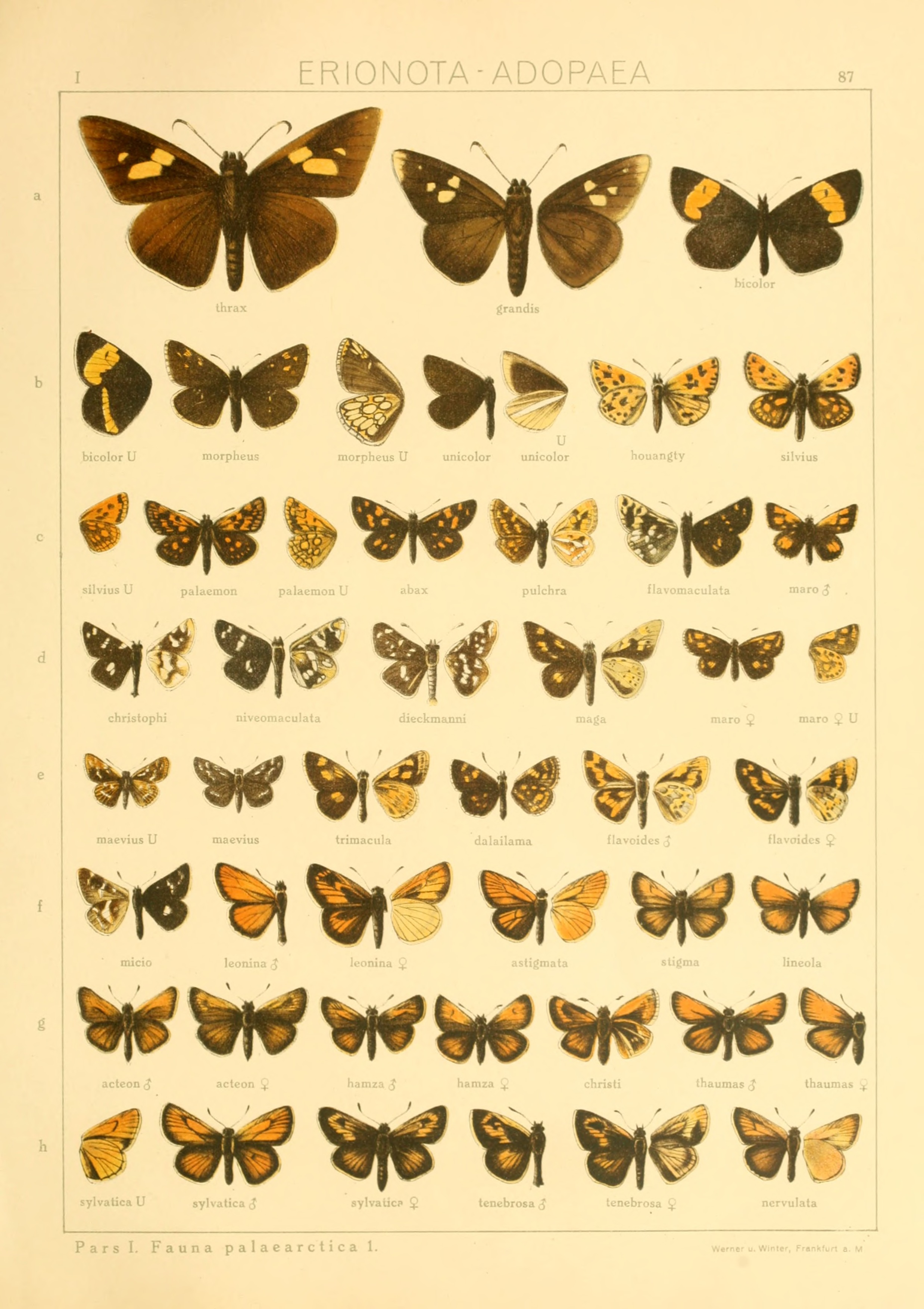
- Ampittia trimacula in Seitz Fauna Palaearctica 87e

Scientific classification
- Domain: Eukaryota
- Kingdom: Animalia
- Phylum: Arthropoda
- Class: Insecta
- Order: Lepidoptera
- Family: Hesperiidae
- Genus: Ampittia
- Species: A. trimacula

Binomial name
- Ampittia trimacula (Leech, 1891)

Synonyms
- Taractrocera trimacula Leech, 1891

= Ampittia trimacula =

Species of butterfly

Ampittia trimacula is a species of butterfly in the family Hesperiidae. It was described by John Henry Leech in 1891. It is found in western China. Forewing obtuse. Hindwing beneath yellow with brown markings, which are more or less distinctly arranged in three transverse rows; there is, moreover, an elongate light spot in the middle of cellules 3 and 4.
