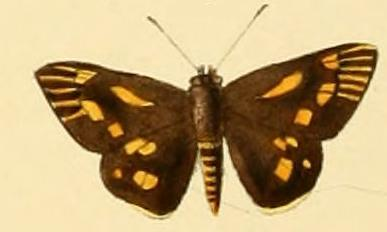

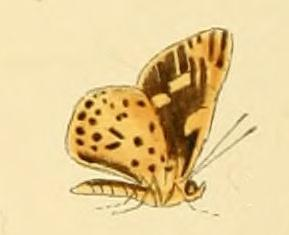

Scientific classification
- Domain: Eukaryota
- Kingdom: Animalia
- Phylum: Arthropoda
- Class: Insecta
- Order: Lepidoptera
- Family: Hesperiidae
- Genus: Ampittia
- Species: A. capenas

Binomial name
- Ampittia capenas (Hewitson, 1868)

Synonyms
- Cyclopides capenas Hewitson, 1868; Cyclopides derbice Hewitson, 1877

= Ampittia capenas =

Riverine ranger

Species of butterfly

Ampittia capenas, the riverine ranger or African bush hopper, is a species of butterfly in the family Hesperiidae.

== Range and habitat ==
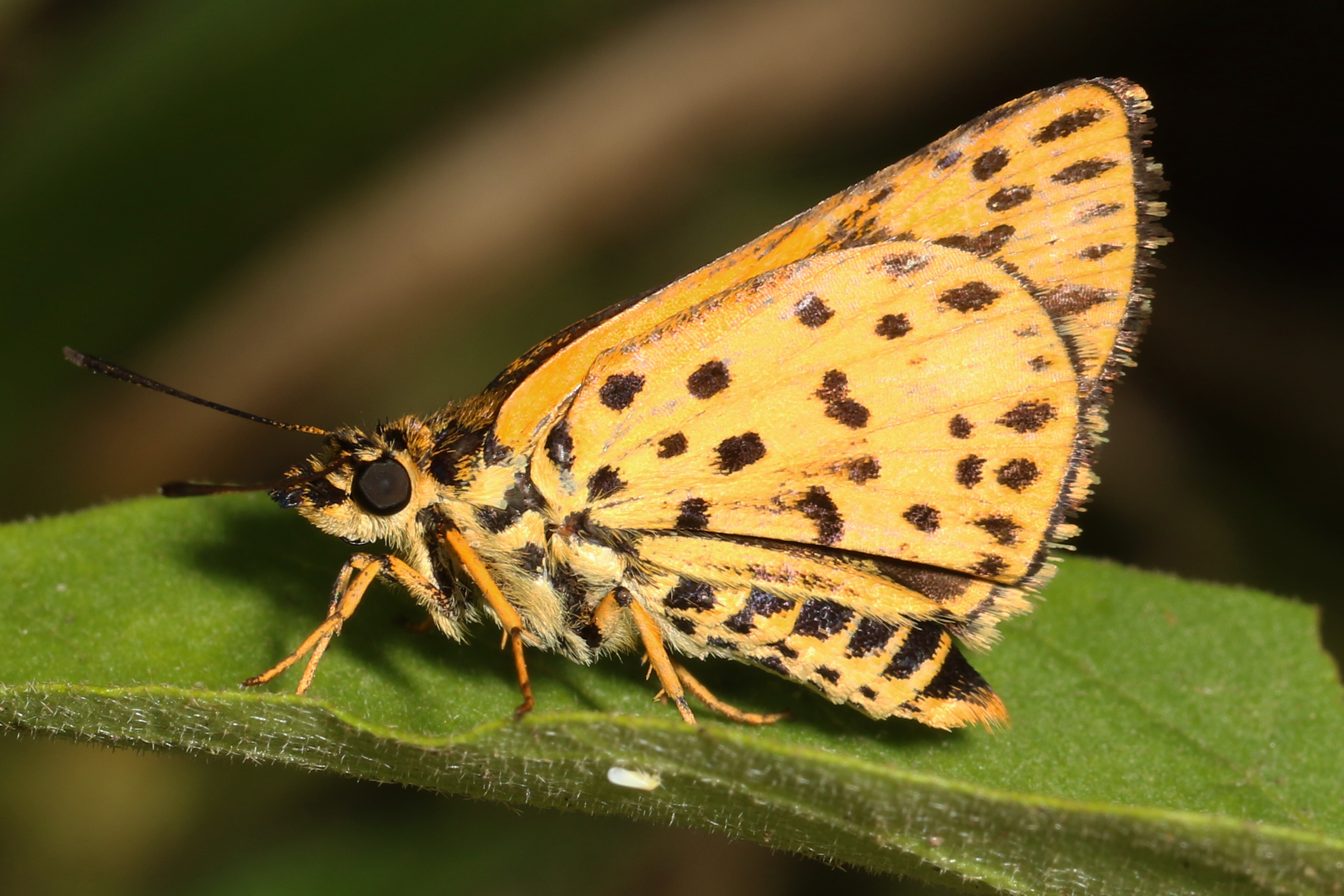
The nominate subspecies at Gorongosa National Park in central Mozambique

It is found in Kenya, Tanzania, Malawi, the Democratic Republic of the Congo, Zambia, Mozambique and Zimbabwe. The habitat consists of the banks of streams and rivers.

== Habits ==
Adults are on wing from August to October and from February to April.

== Subspecies ==
- Ampittia capenas capenas — eastern Kenya, Tanzania, Malawi, Mozambique, Zimbabwe
- Ampittia capenas blanda Evans, 1947 — Democratic Republic of Congo: Shaba, eastern Zambia
