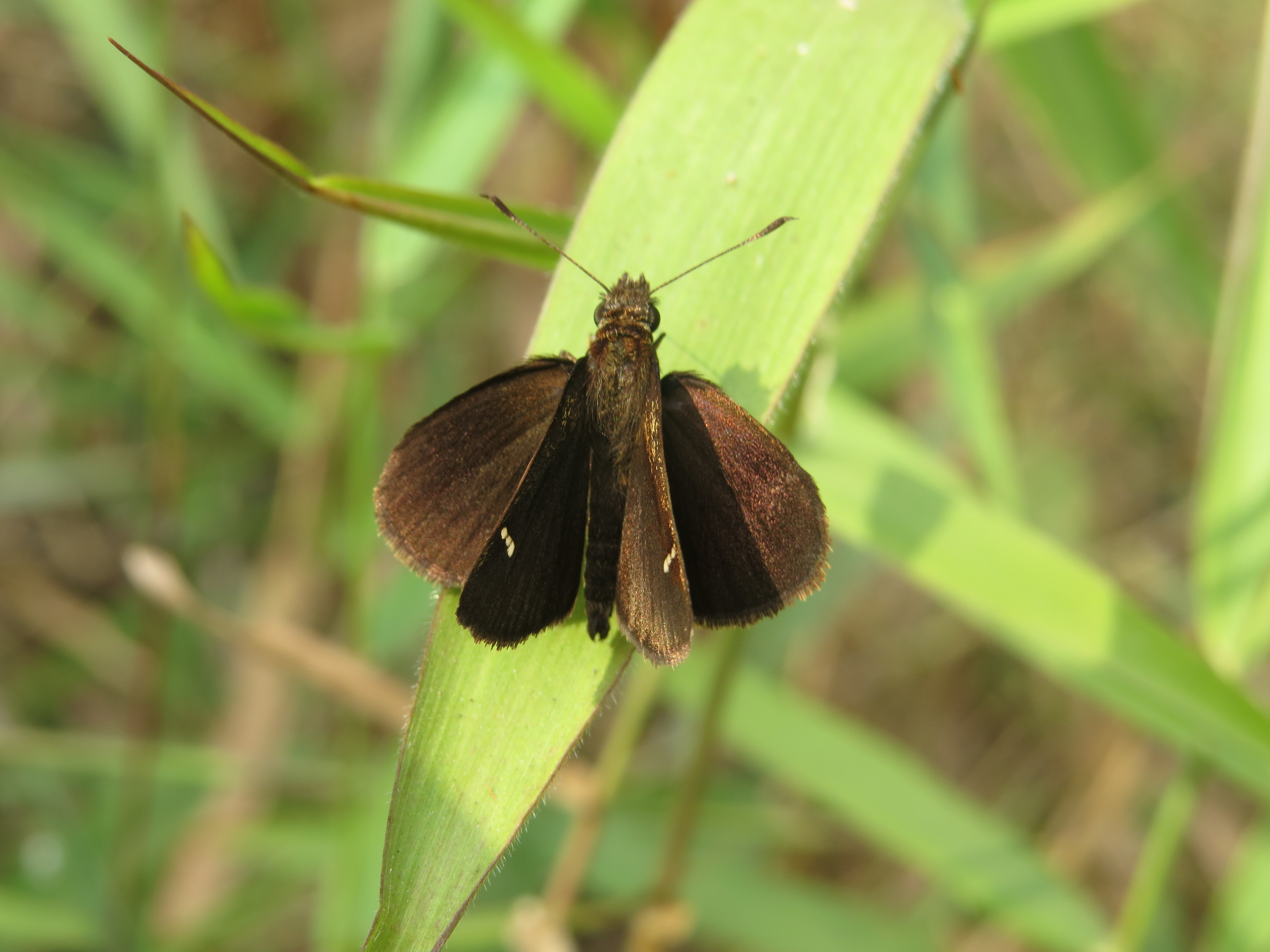

Scientific classification
- Domain: Eukaryota
- Kingdom: Animalia
- Phylum: Arthropoda
- Class: Insecta
- Order: Lepidoptera
- Family: Hesperiidae
- Genus: Arnetta
- Species: A. mercara

Binomial name
- Arnetta mercara Evans, 1932

= Arnetta mercara =

Coorg forest hopper

Species of butterfly

Arnetta mercara, the Coorg forest hopper or Coorg forest bob, is a species of butterfly belonging to the family Hesperiidae. It is found in Kerala and Karnataka.

== Description ==
Upper side: Forewing only with conspicuous conjoined hyaline white apical spots, no discal spots. Underside: Hindwing varies from dark (wet season form), to a variegated form (dry season form) with central and submarginal grey scaling. Forewing of male: 15 mm. Resembles dry season form of Astictopterus jama. Uncus undivided

— William Harry Evans, A Catalogue of the Hesperiidae from Europe, Asia, and Australia in the British Museum
