= Ampittia parva =

Scientific classification
- Kingdom: Animalia
- Phylum: Arthropoda
- Class: Insecta
- Order: Lepidoptera
- Family: Hesperiidae
- Genus: Ampittia
- Species: A. parva

Binomial name
- Ampittia parva Aurivillius, 1925

Species of butterfly

Ampittia parva is a species of butterfly in the family Hesperiidae. It is found in north-eastern Tanzania, including Zanzibar.
