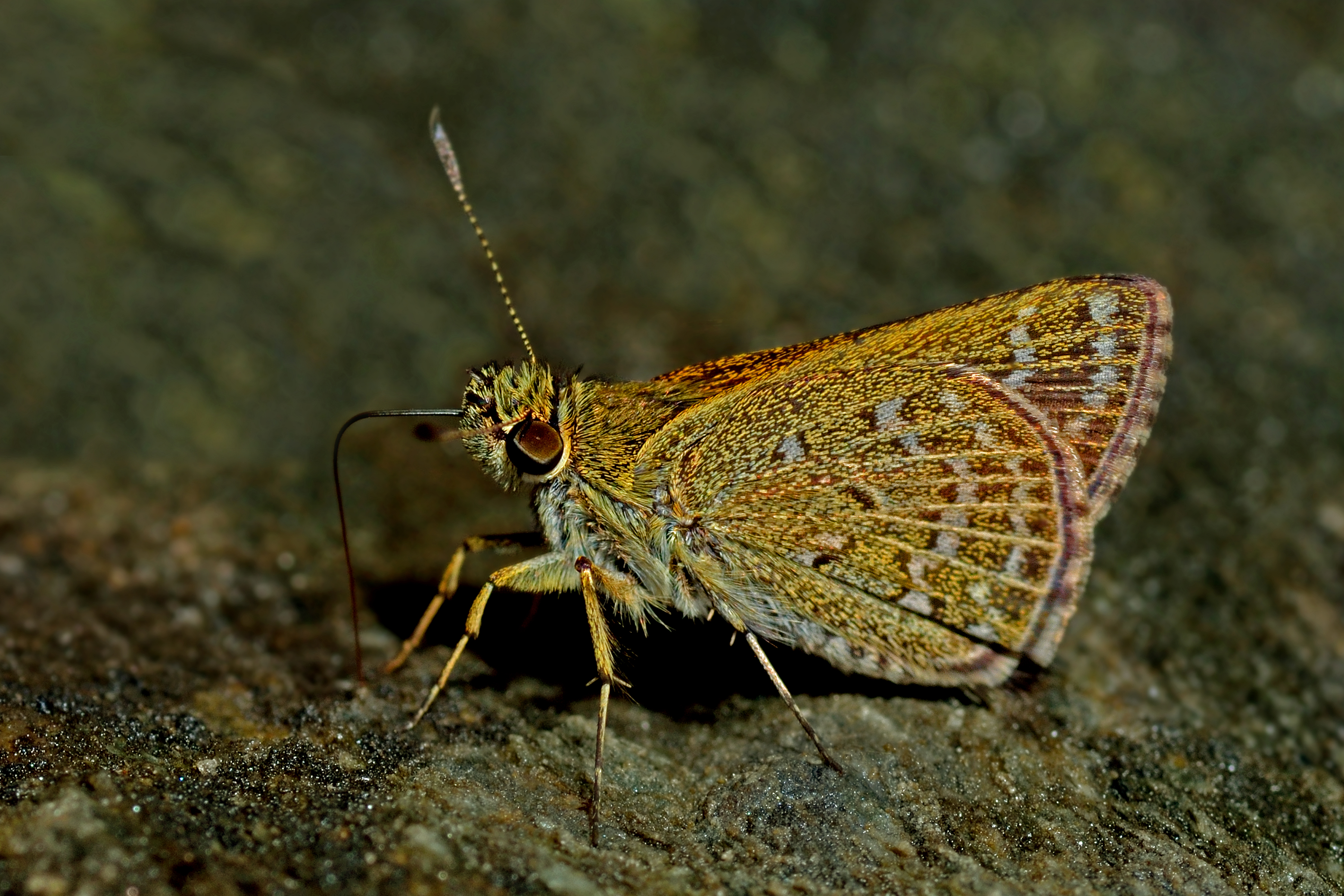
- Lateral view

Scientific classification
- Domain: Eukaryota
- Kingdom: Animalia
- Phylum: Arthropoda
- Class: Insecta
- Order: Lepidoptera
- Family: Hesperiidae
- Genus: Aeromachus
- Species: A. stigmata

Binomial name
- Aeromachus stigmata (Moore, 1878)

= Aeromachus stigmata =

Species of butterfly

Aeromachus stigmata, the veined scrub hopper, is a skipper, a type of butterfly in the family Hesperiidae. The species was first described by Frederic Moore in 1878.

== Subspecies ==
There are three subspecies of Aeromachus stigmata:

- Aeromachus stigmata stigmata (Moore, 1878) – Himalayan veined scrub hopper
- Aeromachus stigmata obsoleta (Moore, 1878) – Patkai veined scrub hopper
- Aeromachus stigmata shanda

== Description ==
The wingspan is 22–28 mm (1–1 in). The species was described by Edward Yerbury Watson in his 1891 Hesperiidae Indica as:

Male and female. Upperside glossy olive-brown: forewing with a short black bar or brand of raised scales obliquely above the middle of hind margin, and a very indistinct upper discal slightly curved row of six small pale spots: cilia whitish-cinereous, with slight brown bars. Underside paler; costal border of the forewing, veins, and basal interspaces of the hindwing speckled with greenish-grey; forewing with whitish discal maculated band as above, but more distinct, a spot at end of the cell and a marginal row of lunules less distinct; hindwing with a distinct whitish cell-spot and a submarginal and marginal lunular band. Female without the raised bar and the discal band above less distinct.

== Distribution and habitat ==
Aeromachus stigmata stigmata is distributed from Murree in Pakistan to Arunachal Pradesh; the north sest Himalayas, Sikkim and Bhutan. A. s. obsoletus is distributed in north-eastern India, south-eastern Bangladesh, and northern Myanmar. A. s. shanda is found in Myanmar from the northern Shan States to Kayin State.

They are predominantly found from the foothills to 1700 meter open forest regions. Their flight period is from April to October. In India, May is the best time to spot them. They fly close to the ground and are sometimes spotted basking on the shrubs or grass.
