= Arnetta verones =

Sumatran bob

Scientific classification
- Kingdom: Animalia
- Phylum: Arthropoda
- Clade: Pancrustacea
- Class: Insecta
- Order: Lepidoptera
- Family: Hesperiidae
- Genus: Arnetta
- Species: A. verones

Binomial name
- Arnetta verones (Hewitson, 1878)

Synonyms
- Astictopterus verones Hewitson, 1878; Arnetta kala Evans, 1932

Species of butterfly

Arnetta verones, the Sumatran bob, is a species of butterfly in the family Hesperiidae. It was described by William Chapman Hewitson in 1878.

== Description ==
Very similar to Koruthaialos sindu (C. & R. Felder, 1860) but lacking the red of that species.

== Distribution ==
It is found in Malaysia and on Borneo and Sumatra.
