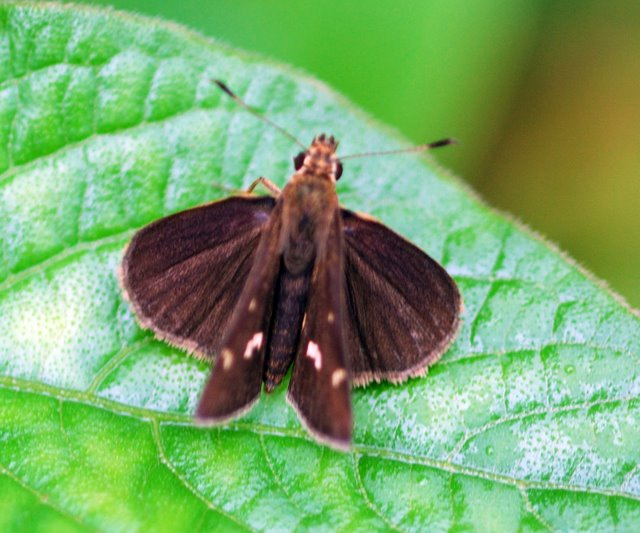

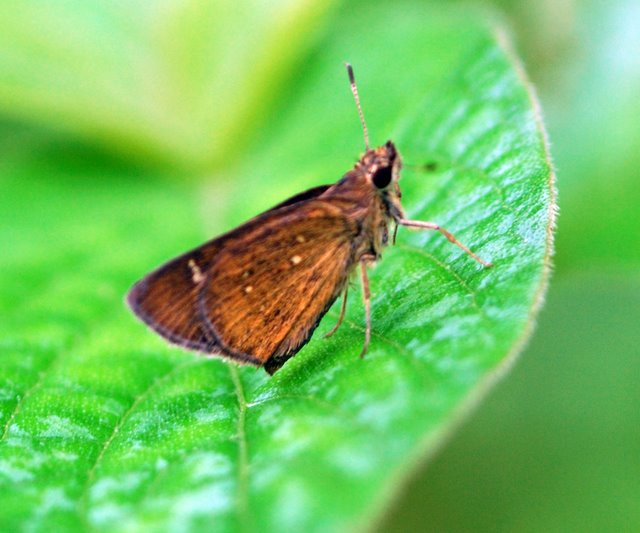

Scientific classification
- Domain: Eukaryota
- Kingdom: Animalia
- Phylum: Arthropoda
- Class: Insecta
- Order: Lepidoptera
- Family: Hesperiidae
- Genus: Arnetta
- Species: A. vindhiana

Binomial name
- Arnetta vindhiana (Moore, 1883)

Synonyms
- Isoteinon vindiana Moore, 1883

= Arnetta vindhiana =

Species of butterfly

Arnetta vindhiana, the Vindhyan bob, is a species of butterfly belonging to the family Hesperiidae. It is native to India.

== Description ==
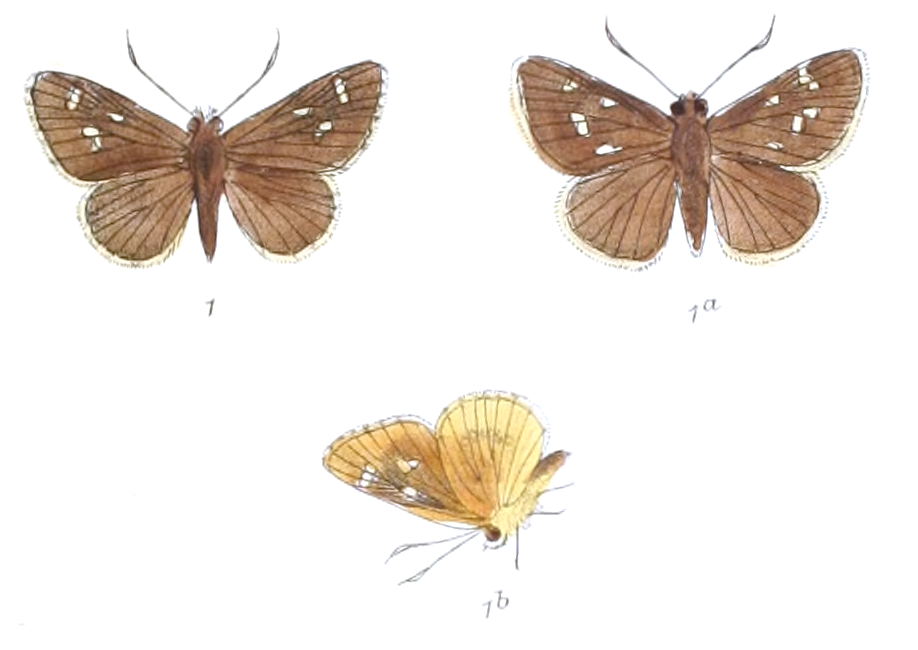

Male. Upperside dark olive-brown; cilia cinereous (ashy grey); forewing with a small yellow semi-transparent spot at upper end of the cell, three conjoined subapical spots, two discal spots, and a small oval spot above the submedian vein. Underside dusky ochreous: forewing with the posterior area broadly black; spots as above; hindwing with a yellow lunule at end of the cell, a small spot above it and five discal spots.

Size: 25–32 mm. On the underside of the hindwing, spots are obscure. On the upperside of the forewing spots on the upper edge of the cell may be absent. The male has no tuft on the underside of the forewing.

== Distribution ==
This species is reported from Palni Hills, Nilgiri Hills, Meghamalai, Wayanad, Coorg, Konkan, west Khandesh, Mhow, Thana, Surat Dangs and Madhya Pradesh. Apparently being absent from the heavier jungle country between Bombay and Coorg. Presumably also found in the Vindhyan rage. T. R. D. Bell stated that they are found in dry, bamboo-growing hilly country, but Wynter-Blyth found it not uncommon on the western slopes of the Nilgiris in September and October in the very wettest, thickest jungle and it seems to be found in similar country in Coorg. Bell says that it is common in the Surat Dangs, where it is found sitting on the ground on dry leaves, blades of grass etc. It visits flowers.

Also recorded from the Nilgiris by George Francis Hampson, who considered this, modesta and nilgiriana as a single species with vindhiana being the dry-season form, nilgiriana the wet-season form, and modesta, described from a single specimen obtained by Mr. Lindsay, a variant. In collections of Indian Museum and Lionel de Nicéville.
