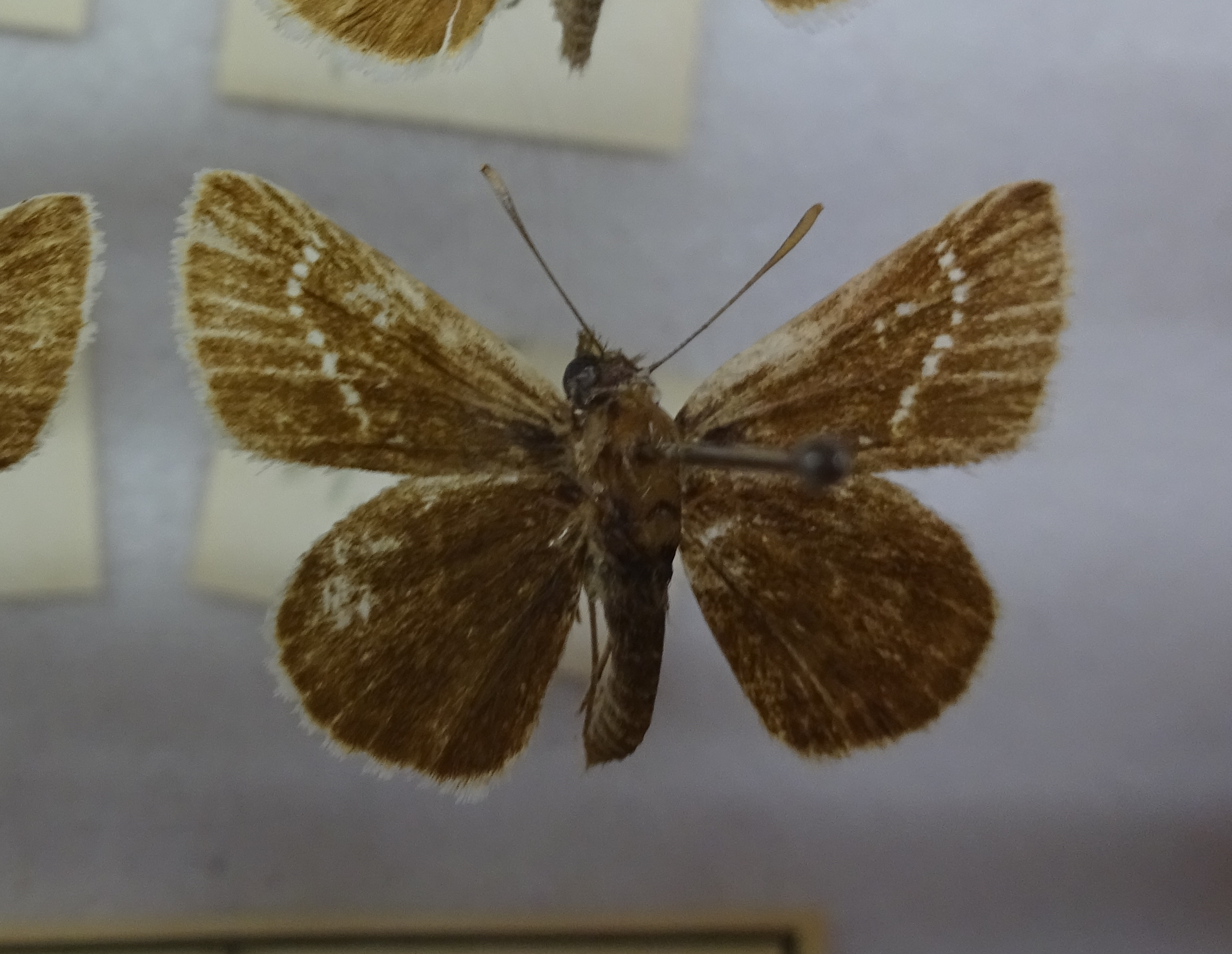

Scientific classification
- Kingdom: Animalia
- Phylum: Arthropoda
- Class: Insecta
- Order: Lepidoptera
- Family: Hesperiidae
- Genus: Aeromachus
- Species: A. inachus

Binomial name
- Aeromachus inachus (Ménétriés, 1859)

Synonyms
- Pyrgus inachus Ménétriés, 1859; Aeromachus inachus ab. extinctus Naritomi, 1941

= Aeromachus inachus =

Species of butterfly

Aeromachus inachus is a butterfly in the family Hesperiidae (Hesperiinae) . It is found in the East Palearctic in Ussuri, Amur, Taiwan, Japan. The larva on feeds on Spodiopogon sibiricus and other Gramineae. There are two or more broods. The larva of this species hibernates.

== Subspecies ==
- Aeromachus inachus inachus
- Aeromachus inachus formosanus Matsumura, 1931
- Aeromachus inachus jiujianganus Murayama
