= Ampittia sichunanensis =

Scientific classification
- Domain: Eukaryota
- Kingdom: Animalia
- Phylum: Arthropoda
- Class: Insecta
- Order: Lepidoptera
- Family: Hesperiidae
- Genus: Ampittia
- Species: A. sichunanensis

Binomial name
- Ampittia sichunanensis Z.G. Wang & Y. Niu, 2002

Species of butterfly

Ampittia sichunanensis is a species of butterfly in the family Hesperiidae. It was described by Z.G. Wang and Y. Niu in 2002. It is found in China (Eimashan).
