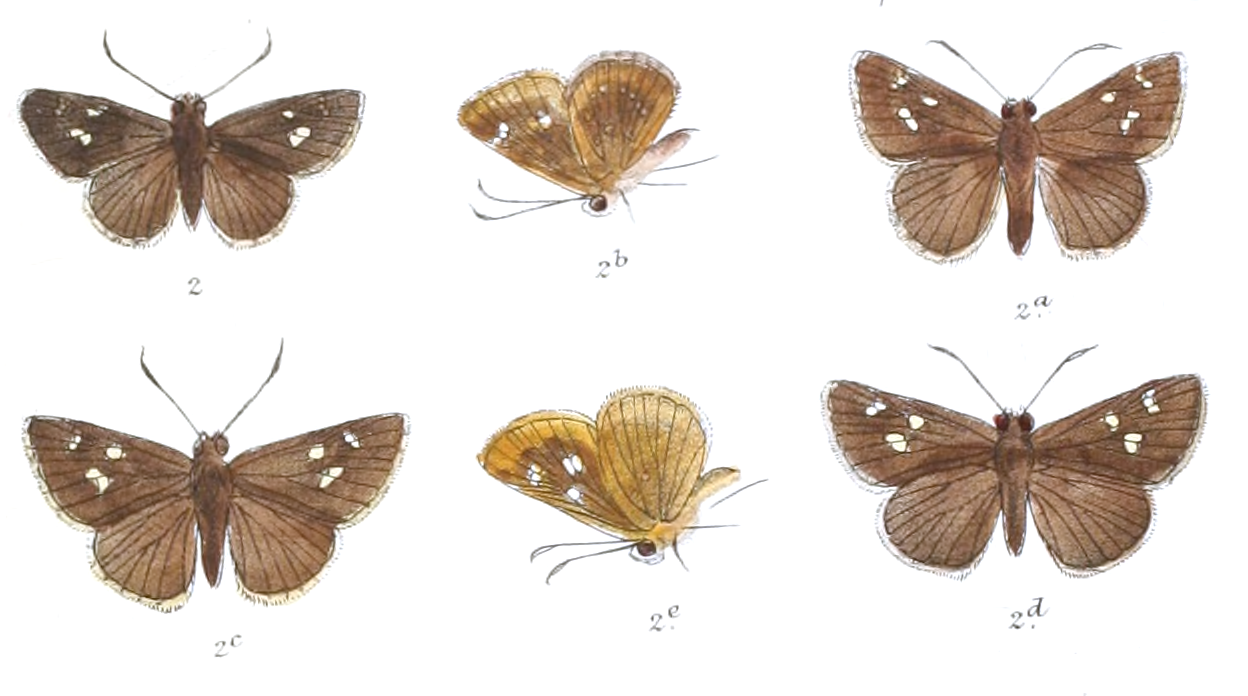

Scientific classification
- Kingdom: Animalia
- Phylum: Arthropoda
- Class: Insecta
- Order: Lepidoptera
- Family: Hesperiidae
- Genus: Arnetta
- Species: A. atkinsoni

Binomial name
- Arnetta atkinsoni (Moore, 1878)

Synonyms
- Isoteinon atkinsoni Moore, 1883; Isoteinon khasianus Moore, 1878; Isoteinon subtestaceus Moore, 1878; Pedestes parnaca Fruhstorfer, 1910; Arnetta atkinsoni sinensis Lee, 1962

= Arnetta atkinsoni =

Species of butterfly

Arnetta atkinsoni is a species of skipper butterfly found in South Asia (Sikkim to Assam, Burma, Thailand, Laos, Vietnam, Yunnan).

== Description ==
Upperside dark glossy olive-brown; cilia brownish-cinereous with a brown inner line and indistinct bars: forewing with a small yellow semi-diaphanous spot at end of the cell, three smaller contiguous spots obliquely before the apex, and two contiguous spots obliquely on the disc. Underside speckled with ochreous-green: forewing marked as above; hindwing with a median discal curved series of eight small prominent white spots, and a spot at end of the cell.

— Edward Yerbury Watson

It is found in Darjeeling, India. Wing expanse of 1.1 inches (28 mm).

== Gallery ==
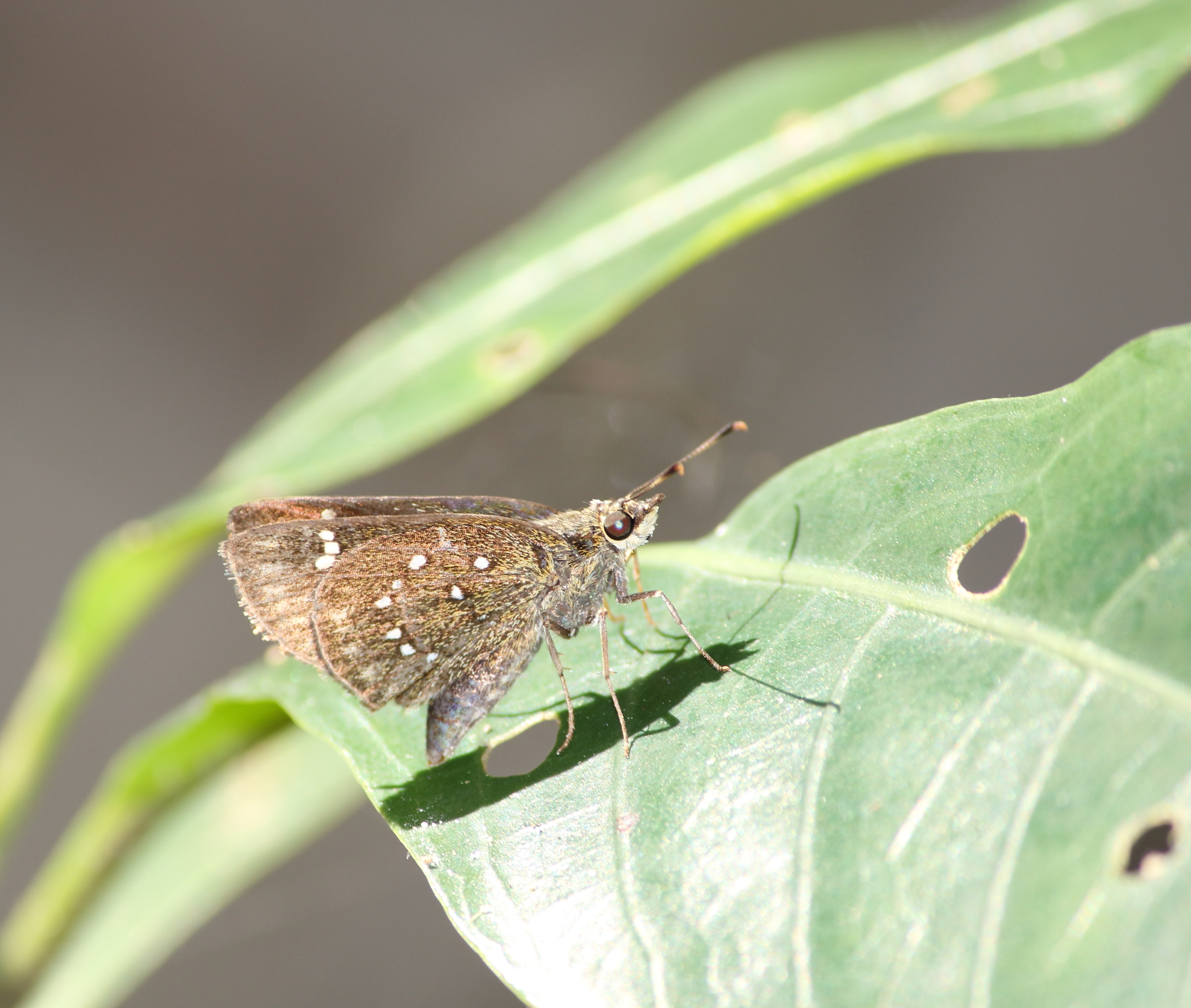
