= Ampittia tristella =

Scientific classification
- Domain: Eukaryota
- Kingdom: Animalia
- Phylum: Arthropoda
- Class: Insecta
- Order: Lepidoptera
- Family: Hesperiidae
- Genus: Ampittia
- Species: A. tristella

Binomial name
- Ampittia tristella Shou, Chou & Li, 2006

Species of butterfly

Ampittia tristella is a species of butterfly in the family Hesperiidae. It was described by Shou, Chou and Li in 2006. It is found in China (Shaanxi Province).
