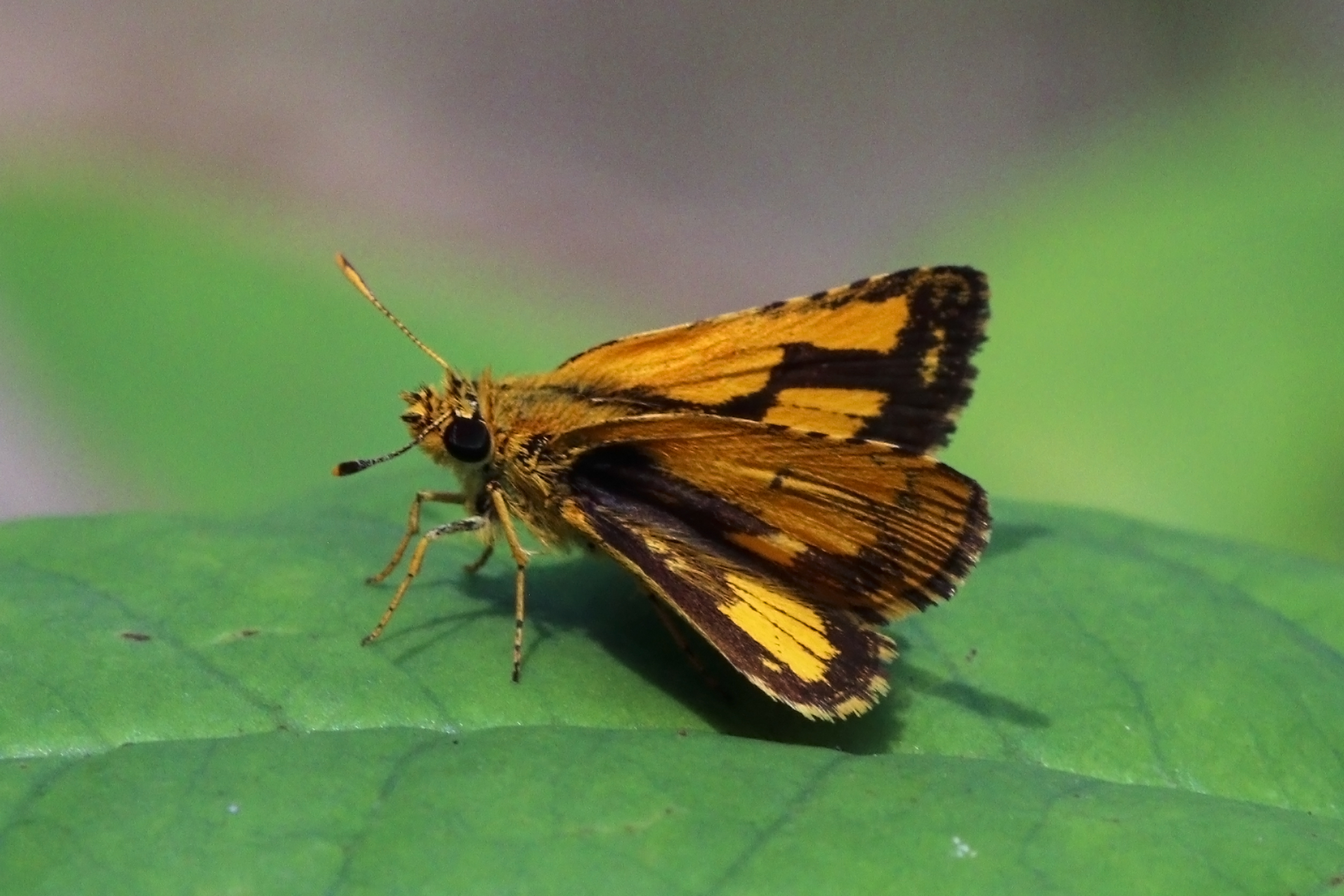
- A. d. dioscorides in Kerala, India
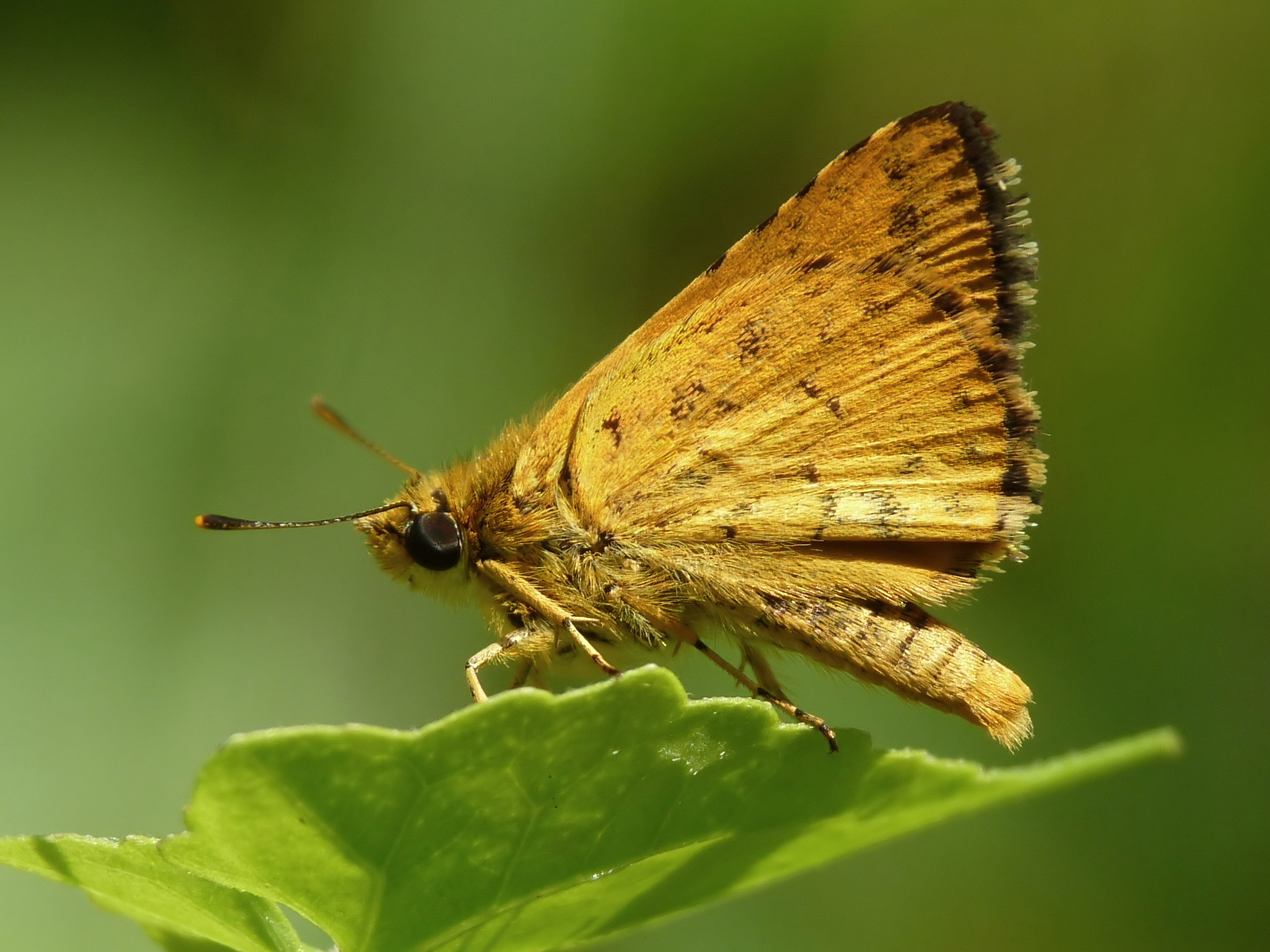
- Male in Kerala, India

Scientific classification
- Kingdom: Animalia
- Phylum: Arthropoda
- Class: Insecta
- Order: Lepidoptera
- Family: Hesperiidae
- Genus: Ampittia
- Species: A. dioscorides

Binomial name
- Ampittia dioscorides (Fabricius, 1793)

= Ampittia dioscorides =

Common bush hopper

Species of butterfly

Ampittia dioscorides, the common bush hopper or simply bush hopper, is a species of butterfly found in India, China, Indochina, Cambodia and on to Borneo, Sumatra and Java belonging to the family Hesperiidae.

== Description ==
Male. Upper.side. Forewing bright golden-yellow, costal line black, outer margin with a broad even black band, slightly but squarely bulged inward at the hinder angle, a broad black baud on the hinder margin with two golden-yellow spots in it, one a little before the middle, the other a little beyond the middle; a black band running up from the middle of the hinder marginal band to the costa one-third before the apex, throwing out a cross band from above its middle and joining the marginal

band; in some examples this diseal band is disconnected from the costa from the crossbar. Hindwing blackish-brown, with an irregular-shaped, short, broad, diseal, golden yellow band, composed of spots divided by the veins, the two centre ones elongated, the lower ones small. Cilia brown, touched in parts with golden-yellow, especially at the anal angle. Underside. Forewing as above, but the extreme outer margin is more or less golden-yellow. Hindwing with the ground colour golden-yellow, most of the wing covered with minute brown scales, the diseal patch as above, edged with pale in-own, and a series of pale brown sub-marginal spots all round the wing from the base to the anal angle. Antennae black, ringed with yellow, the cIub yellow on the underside and at the tip; palpi, head and body brown above, palpi and head marked with yellow, all yellow beneath.

Female. Upperside dark brown. Forewing with a yellow spot at the end of the cell, and a diseal series of yellow spots, two, sometimes three, divided by the veins, from near the costa, one-sixth from the apex, two in the middle of the disc in the median interspaces, and a small one in the interno-median interspace, an indistinctseries of sub-marginal yellowish spots on the upper half of the wing. Underside paler. Forewing with the spots as above put larger, a yellow sub-costal streak from the base to beyond the middle. Hindwing with many minute yellow scales in parts, a discal series of yellowish spots and a sub-marginal series.

— Charles Swinhoe, Lepidoptera Indica. Vol. X

== Subspecies ==
- A. d. dioscorides Ceylon, Peninsular India, Calcutta, Sikkim to Assam, Burma
- A. d. etura (Mabille, 1891) Vietnam, Hainan, South Yunnan, Taiwan
- A. d. camertes (Hewitson, 1868) Burma, Thailand, Laos, Yunnan, Malaysia, Singapore, Borneo, Sumatra, Nias, Java, Bali
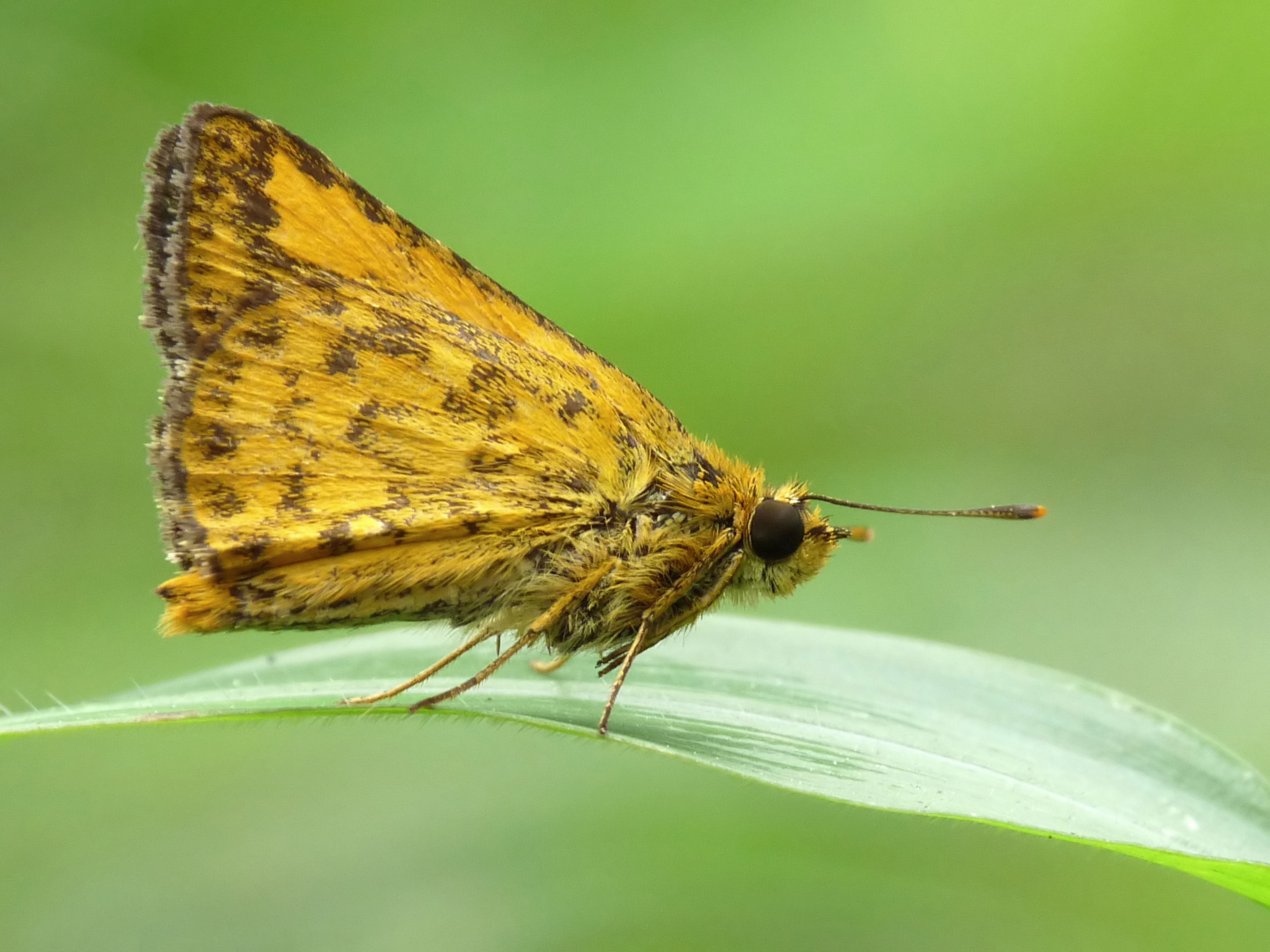
Male

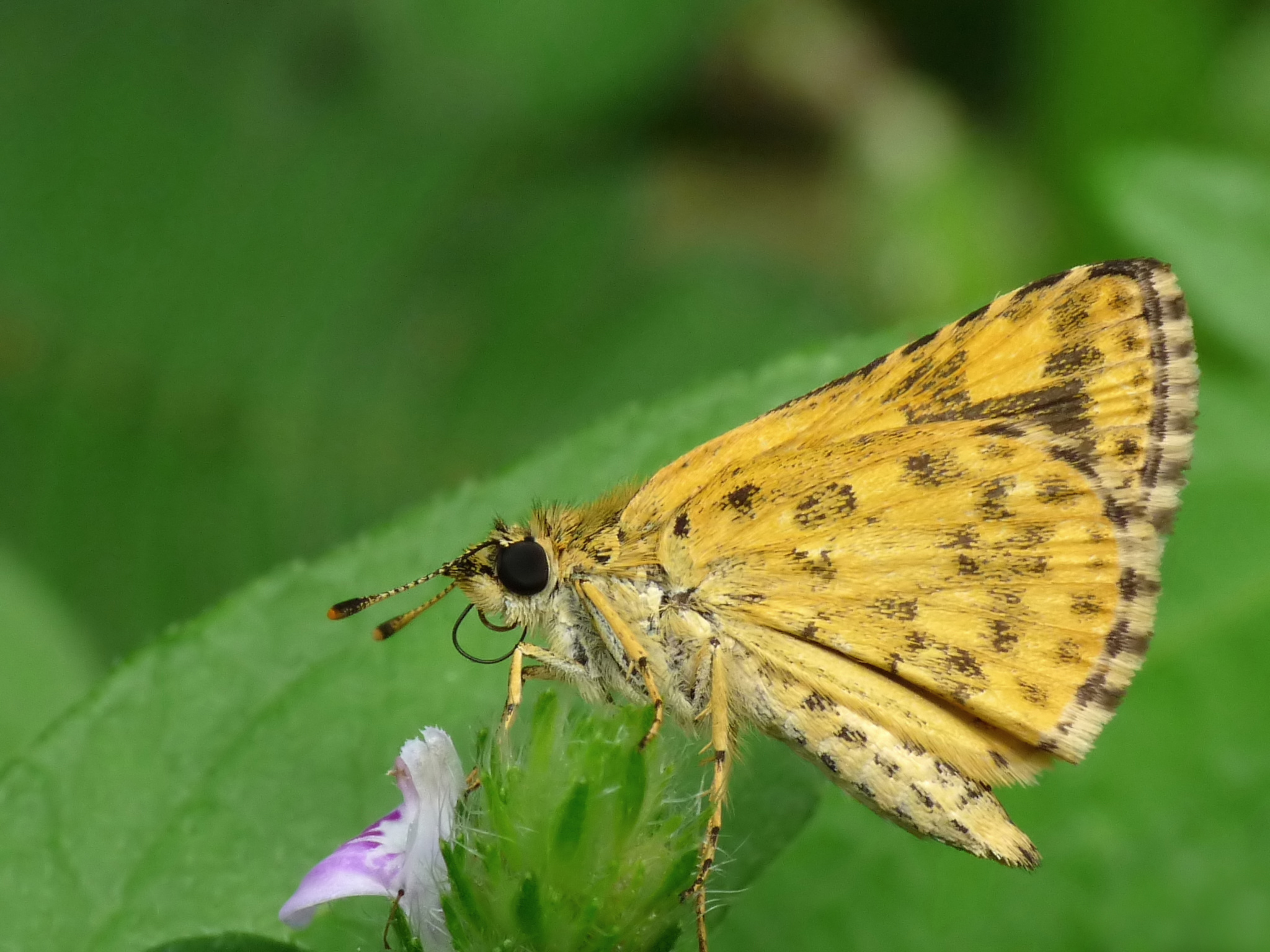
Female

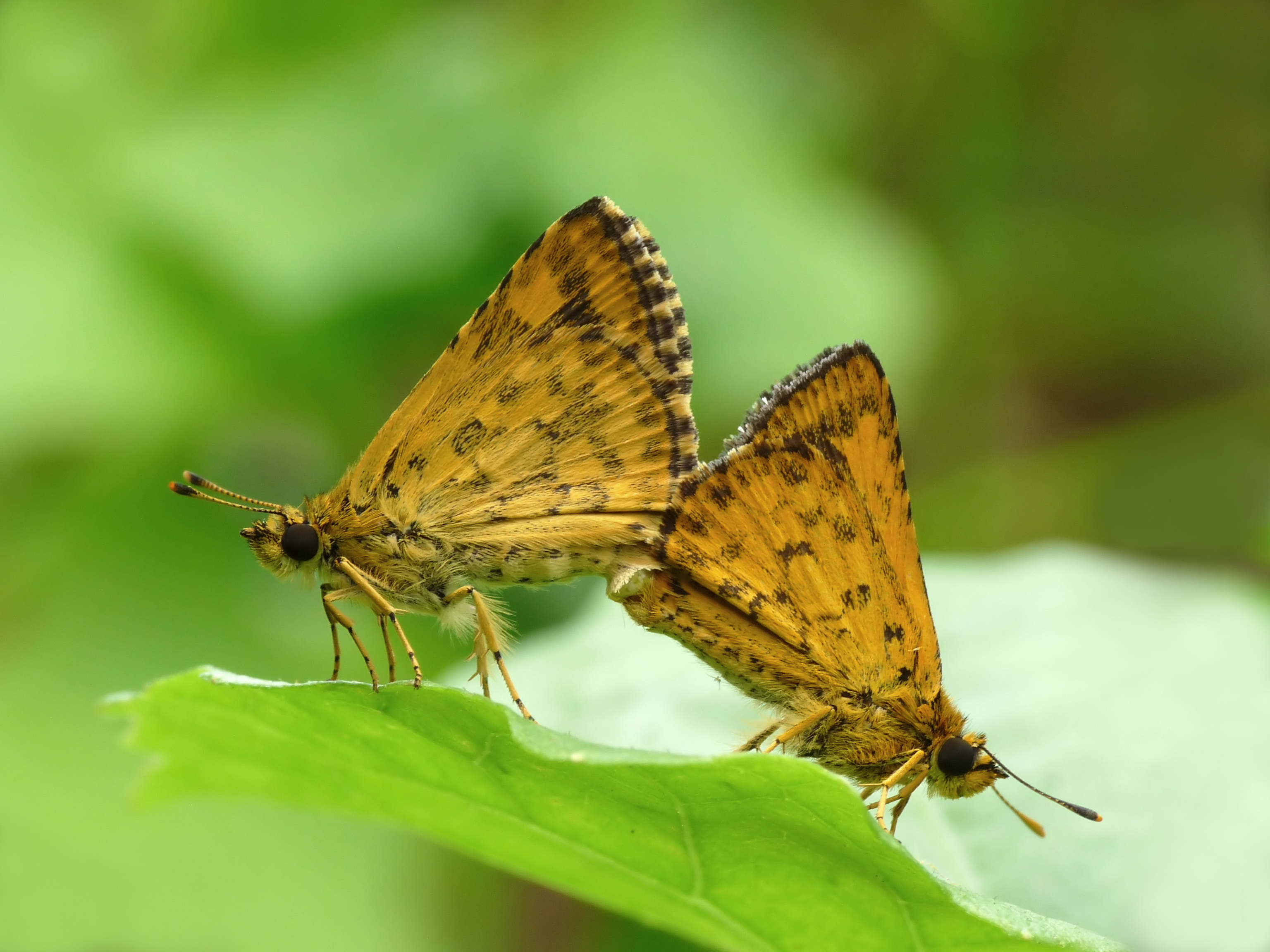
Mating pair; male right, female left

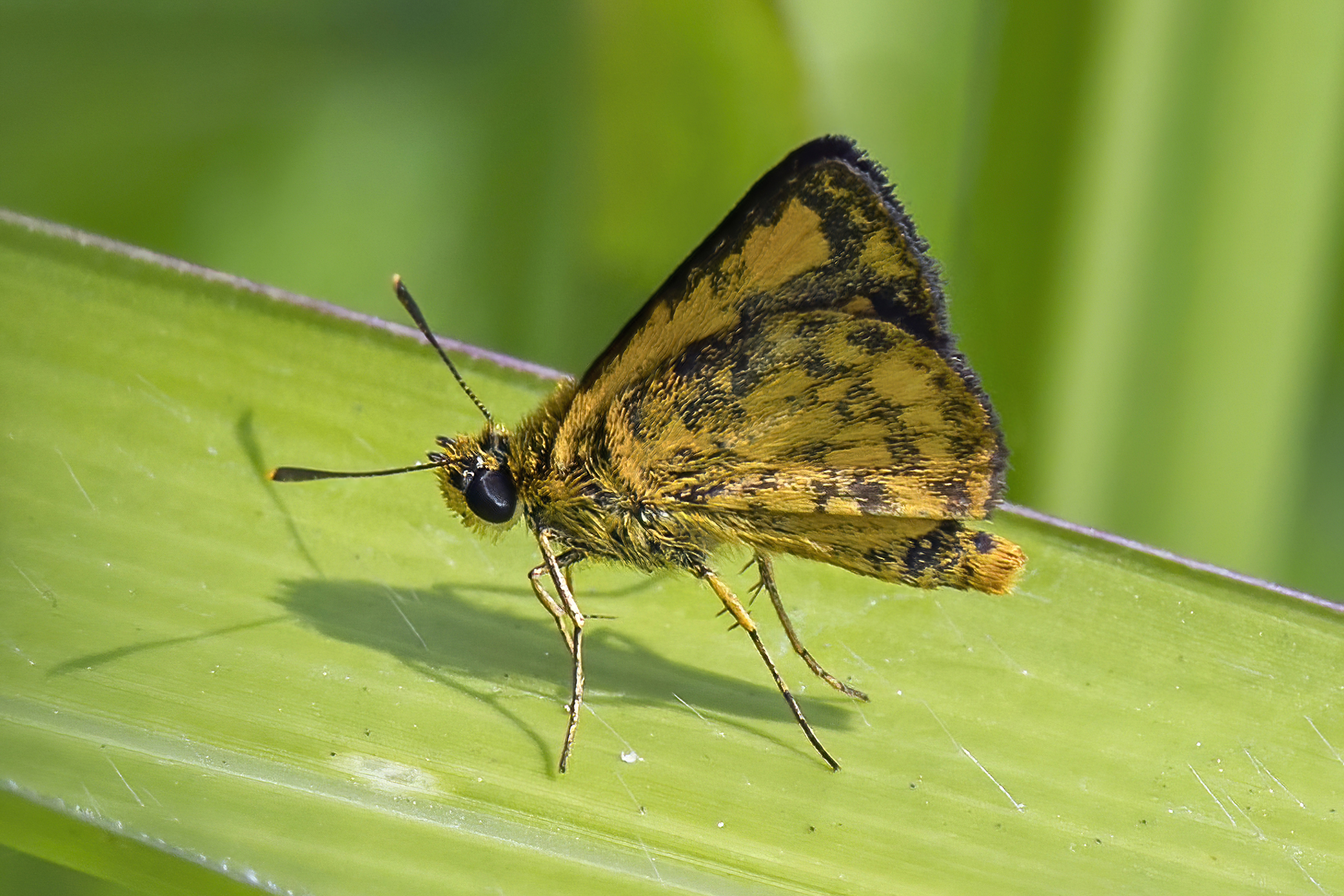
A. d. singa, male Sri Lanka

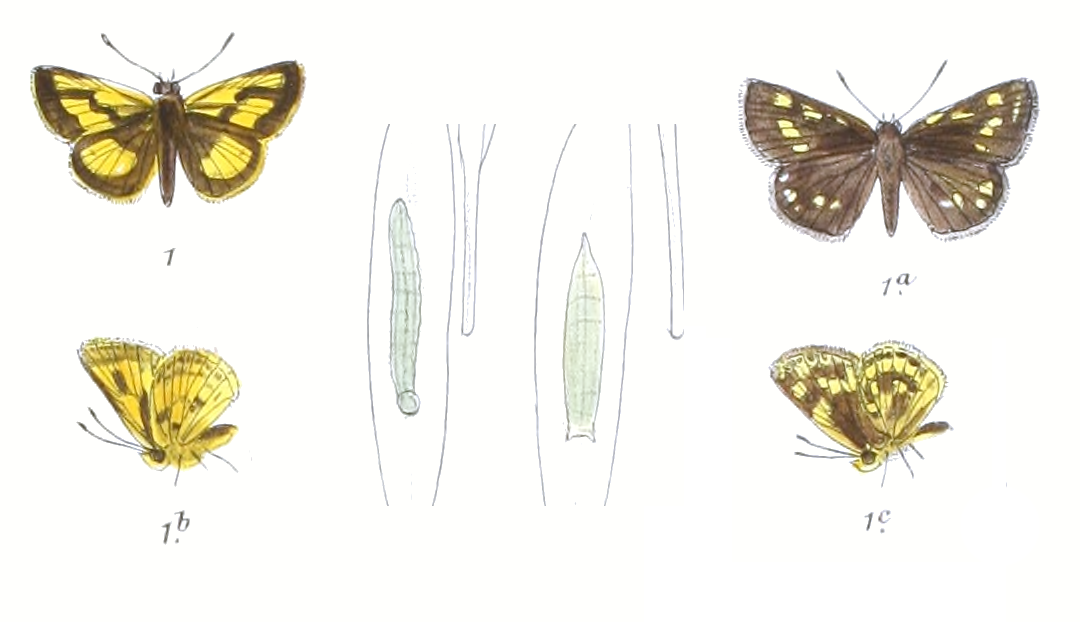
Illustration
