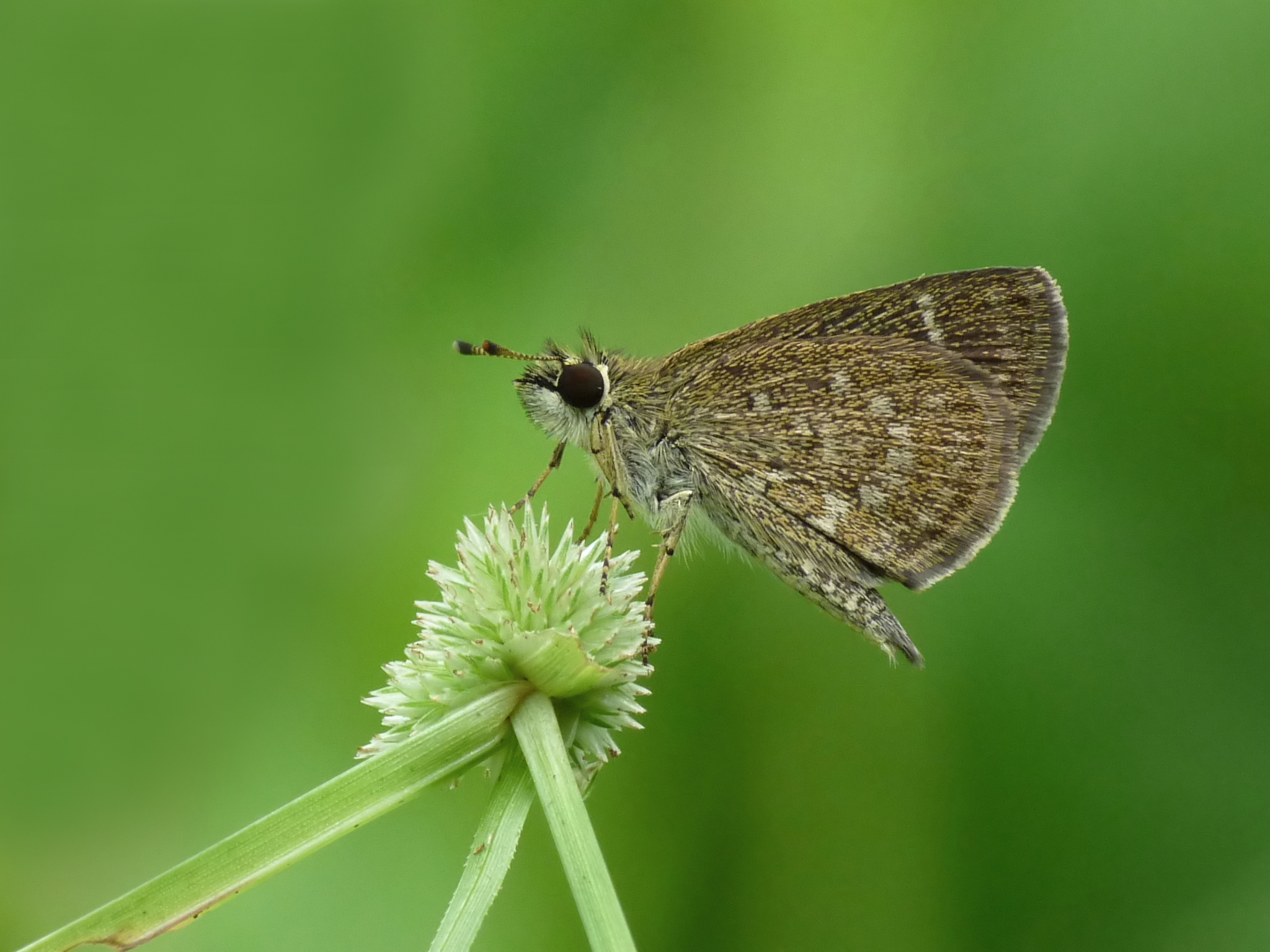

Scientific classification
- Kingdom: Animalia
- Phylum: Arthropoda
- Class: Insecta
- Order: Lepidoptera
- Family: Hesperiidae
- Genus: Aeromachus
- Species: A. pygmaeus

Binomial name
- Aeromachus pygmaeus (Fabricius, 1775)

Synonyms
- Thanaos indistincta Moore, 1878

= Aeromachus pygmaeus =

Pygmy grass-hopper

Species of butterfly

Aeromachus pygmaeus, the pygmy scrub-hopper is a butterfly belonging to the family Hesperiidae. The species range is from India (Nilgiris, Wynaad, Coorg, Kanara, Assam) to Burma and Thailand.

== Description ==
Male. Upperside uniform olive-brown, without any markings; in some examples there are very faint indications of some discal and sub-marginal marks. Cilia concolorous with the wings, slightly paler at the tips. Underside paler; a small whitish spot at the end of the cell, sometimes absent, an indistinct whitish and outwardly curved discal, thin baud from near the costa halfway down the wing, the upper and outer portions of the wing sparsely covered with minute white scales. Hindwing entirely covered with minute white scales, traces of a whitish outwardly curved discal band and a very indistinct series of sub-marginal spots a little darker than the ground colour. Antennge black, ringed with white, club whitish on the underside, all except its tip; palpi, head and body above concolorous with the wings, whitish on the underside. Female similar to the male.

— Charles Swinhoe, Lepidoptera Indica. Vol. X

The larvae feed on Polytrias indica, Cyrtococcum trigonum, and Stenotaphrum secundatum.
