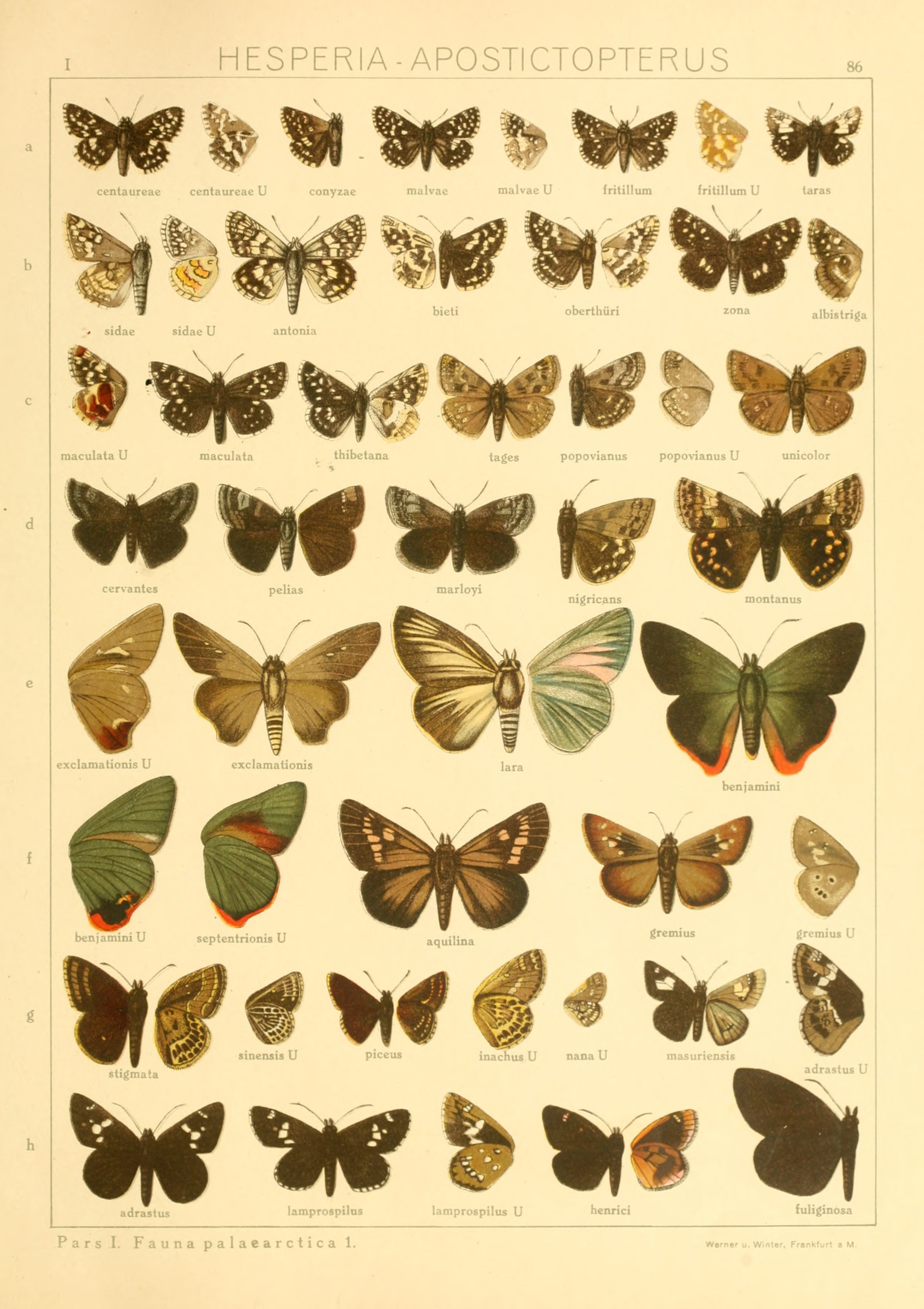
- "Ampittia nanus" in Adalbert Seitz's Fauna Palaearctica page 86, line "g"

Scientific classification
- Kingdom: Animalia
- Phylum: Arthropoda
- Class: Insecta
- Order: Lepidoptera
- Family: Hesperiidae
- Genus: Aeromachus
- Species: A. nanus

Binomial name
- Aeromachus nanus (Leech, 1890)

Synonyms
- Cyclopides nanus Leech, 1890; Ampittia nanus (Leech, 1890)

= Aeromachus nanus =

Species of insect

Aeromachus nanus is a species of butterfly in the family Hesperiidae. It was described by John Henry Leech in 1890. The later combination of Ampittia nanus is in Evans, 1949, then else as Aeromachus nanus is in Huang et al. 2019. The species is found in China.

== Description ==
One of the two marginal rows of spots of the forewing in cellules 5, 6 and 7, or 6, 7 and 8, the other in cellule 2 and 3: no light spot in cellule 4. A spot in the cell near the upper angle ash colour.
