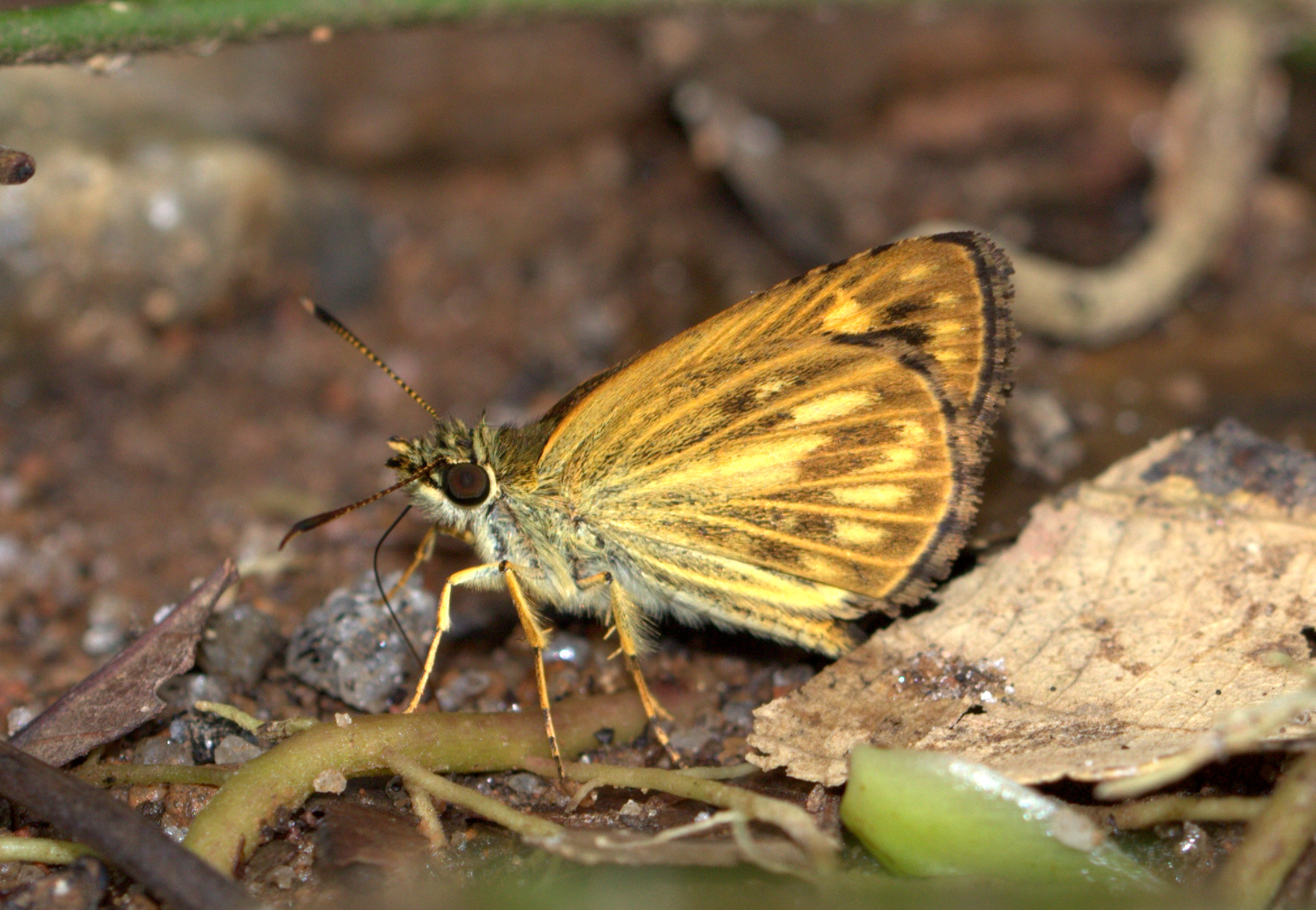
- From Kozhikode, Kerala

Scientific classification
- Kingdom: Animalia
- Phylum: Arthropoda
- Class: Insecta
- Order: Lepidoptera
- Family: Hesperiidae
- Genus: Baracus
- Species: B. vittatus

Binomial name
- Baracus vittatus (Felder, 1862)

= Baracus vittatus =

Hedge-hopper

Species of butterfly

Baracus vittatus, the hedge-hopper, is a butterfly belonging to the family Hesperiidae. It is found in India and Sri Lanka.

== Description ==
In 1891, Edward Yerbury Watson described this butterfly as:

Male and female. Upperside dark olive-brown. Male with the lower basal and discal area of both wings olive-grey, and a small subapical spot of the same colour also on the forewing. Female: forewing with a small olive -grey subapical spot and slender macular discal streak: hindwing with less distinct olive-grey lower basal and discal area. Underside ferruginous, the veins narrowly lined with paler ferruginous: forewing with the basal area dusky brown: hindwing with a longitudinal medial yellow fascia from base of cell, and less distinct short yellow discal streak between the veins. Body, palpi, and legs olive-brown, paler beneath.

— Edward Yerbury Watson

== Subspecies ==
- B. v. vittatus (Felder, 1862) Sri Lanka
- B. v. subditus Moore, [1884] south India
- B. v. septentrionum Wood-Mason & de Nicéville, [1887] Sikkim to northeast India
- B. v. hampsoni Elwes & Edwards, 1897 (Hampson's hedge hopper) south India
- B. v. gotha Evans, 1949 Tamil Nadu

== Life history ==
The larvae feed on Gramineae.

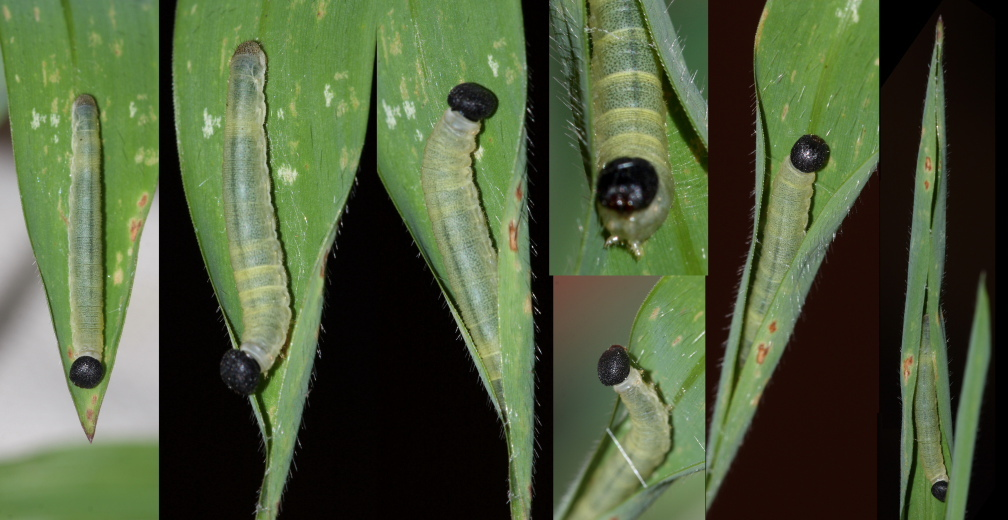
Larva

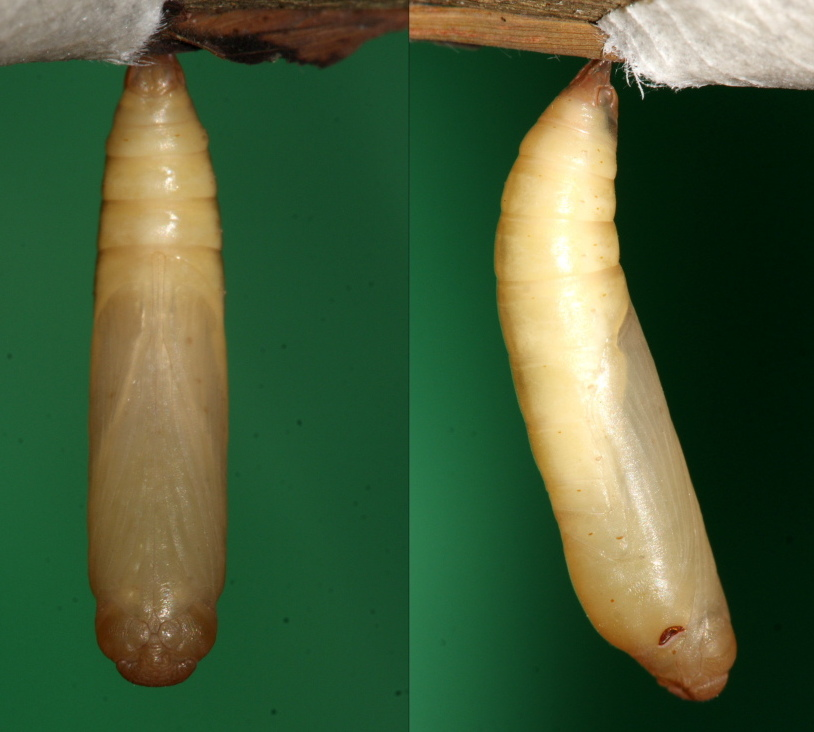
Chrysalis

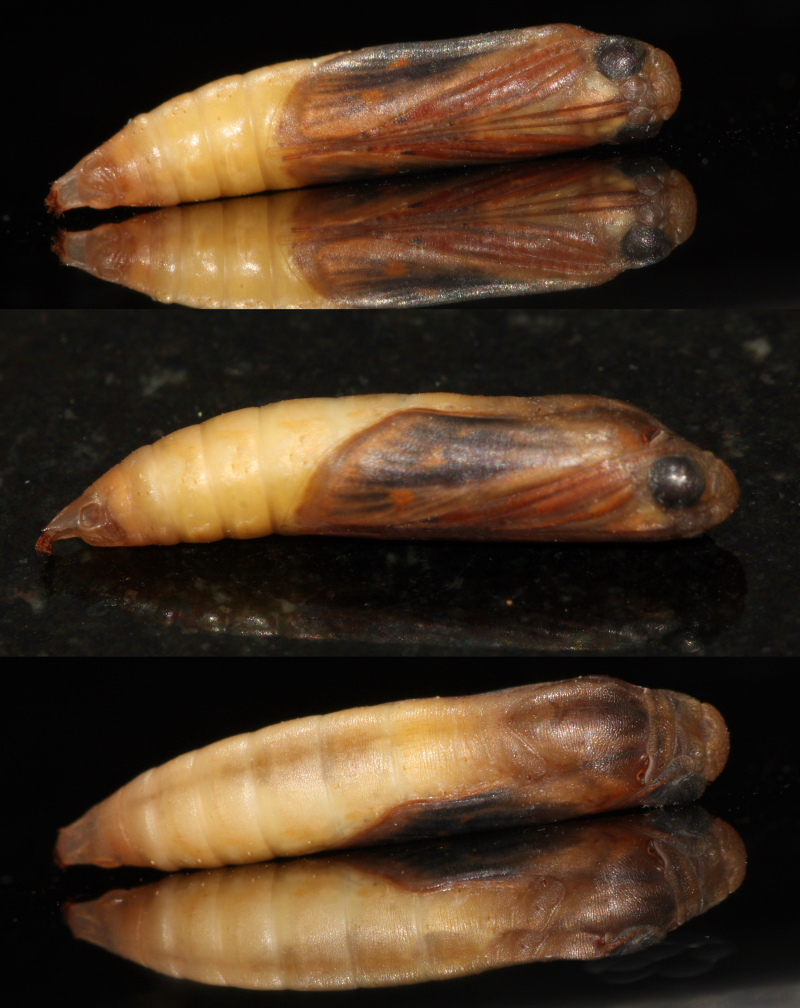
Chrysalis

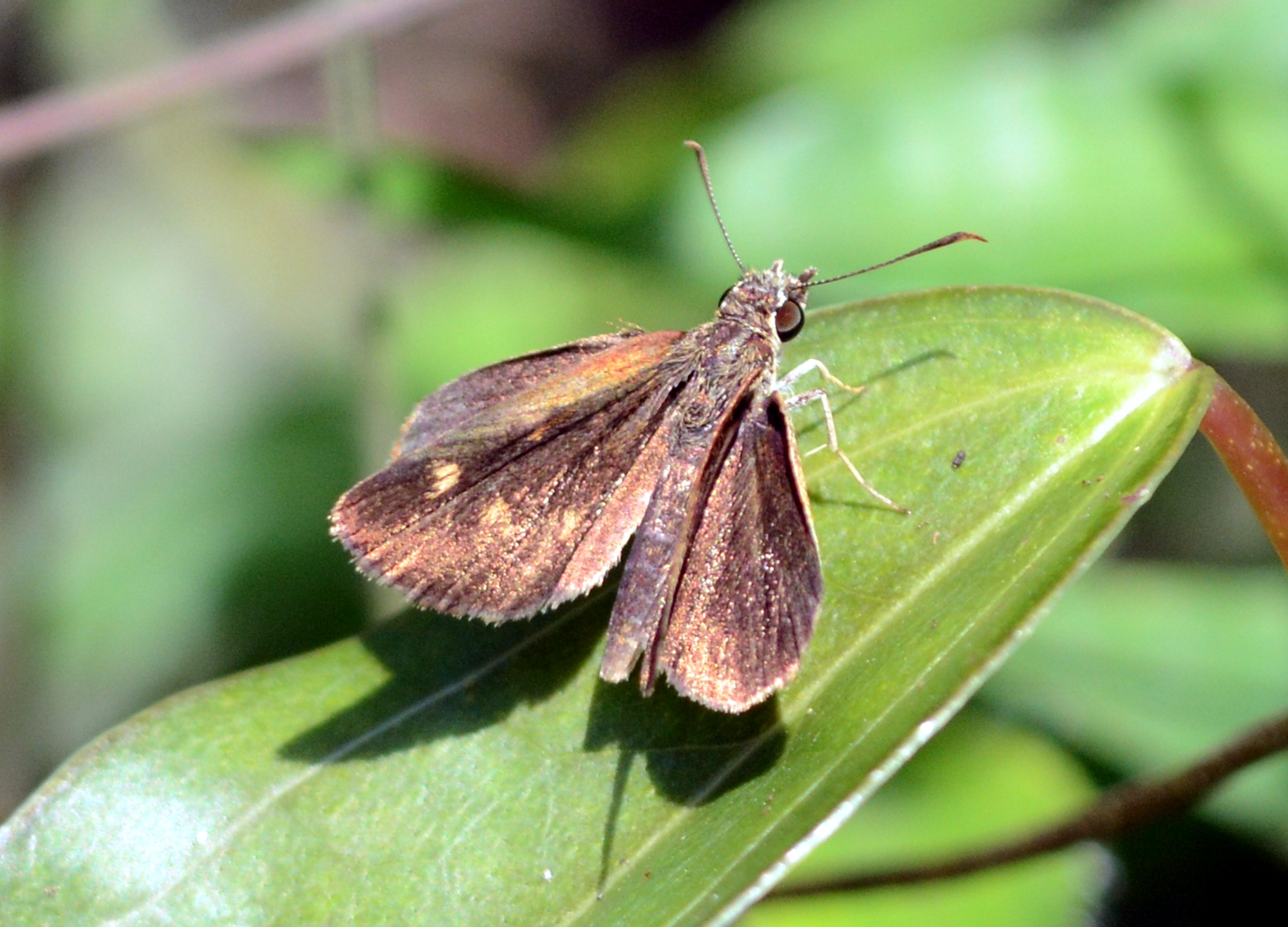
Imago (dorsal view)

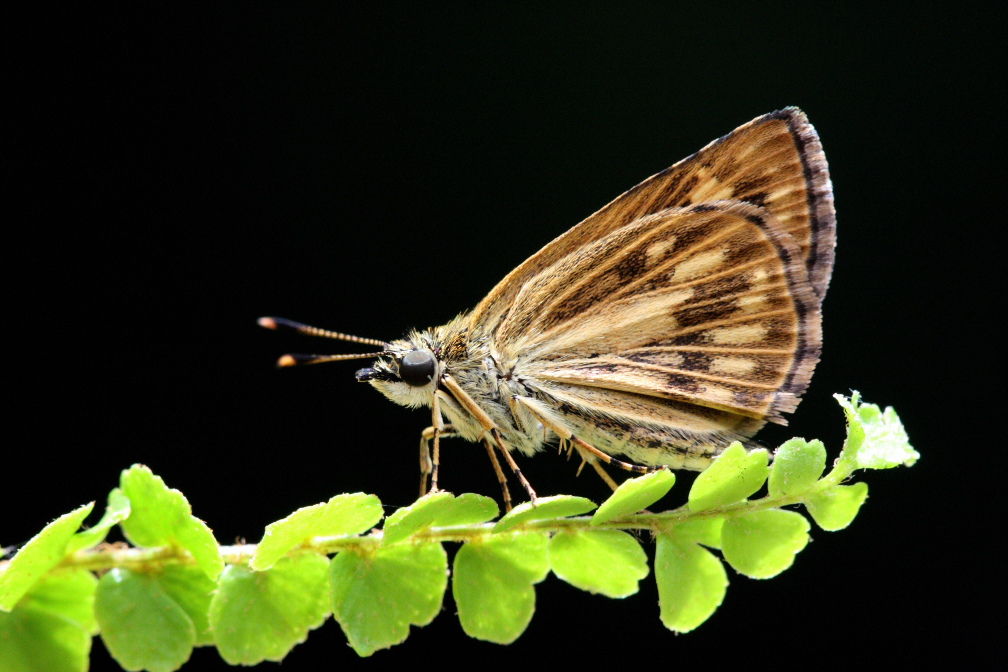
Imago (ventral view)

== See also ==
- Papilionidae
- List of butterflies of India
- List of butterflies of India (Hesperiidae)
