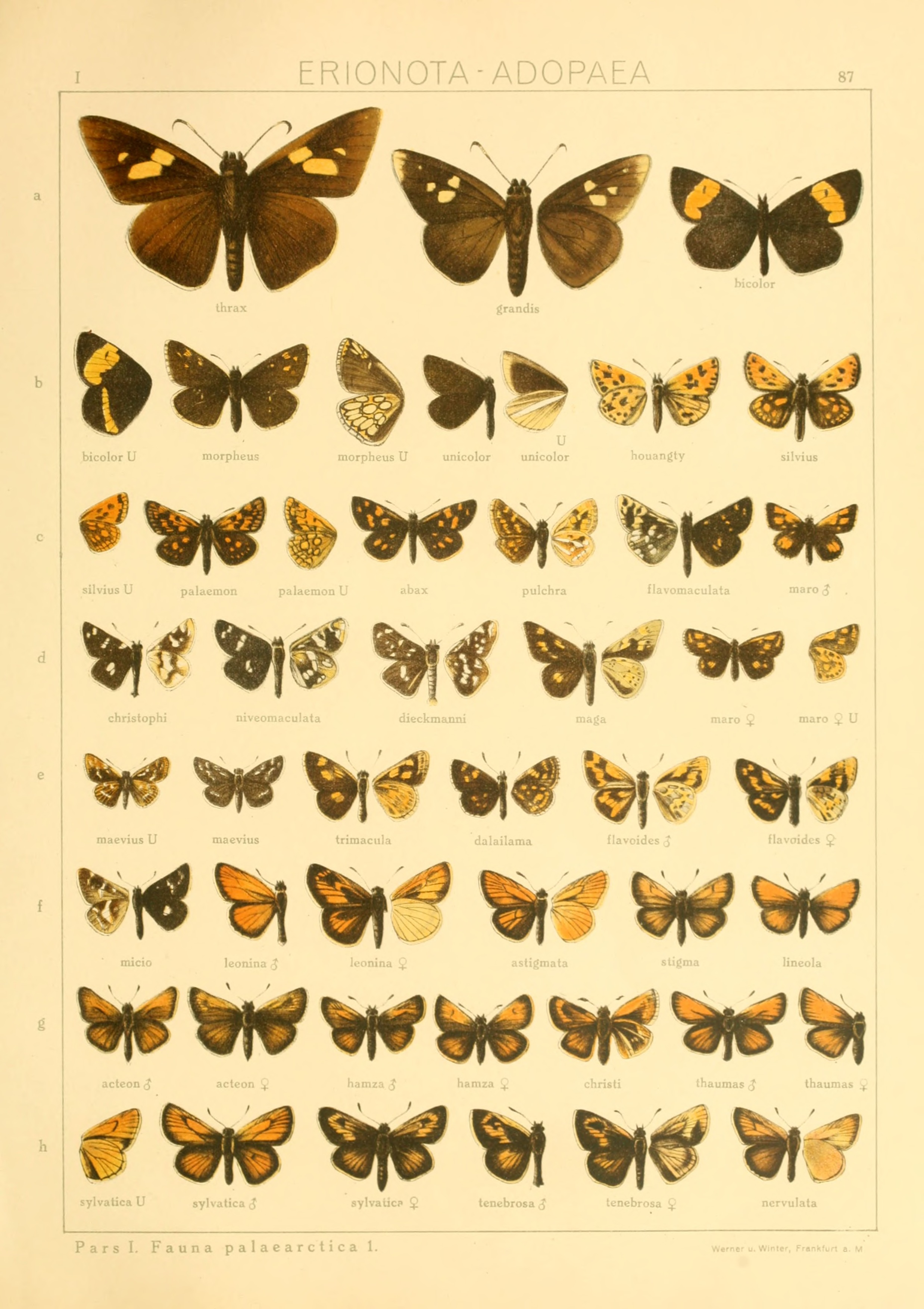
- "Ampittia dalailama" in Adalbert Seitz's Fauna Palaearctica, page 87 line "e"

Scientific classification
- Kingdom: Animalia
- Phylum: Arthropoda
- Class: Insecta
- Order: Lepidoptera
- Family: Hesperiidae
- Genus: Ampittia
- Species: A. dalailama

Binomial name
- Ampittia dalailama (Mabille, 1876)

Synonyms
- Cyclopides dalailama Mabille, 1876; Ampittia dalailama (Mabille, 1876); Taractrocera lyde Leech, 1891

= Aeromachus dalailama =

Species of butterfly

Aeromachus dalailama is a species of butterfly in the family Hesperiidae. It was described by Paul Mabille in 1876. It is found in Tibet and western China.

== Description ==
Hindwing beneath brown, densely dusted with yellow scales, with three yellow spots near the base and a postmedian as well as a subterminal row of yellow dots; the postmedian spots of cellules 3 and 4 are placed near the centre of these cellules and cover their whole breadth.

== Subspecies ==
- Aeromachus dalailama dalailama (Mabille, 1876) China
- Aeromachus dalailama jesta (Evans, 1939) Tibet, China
