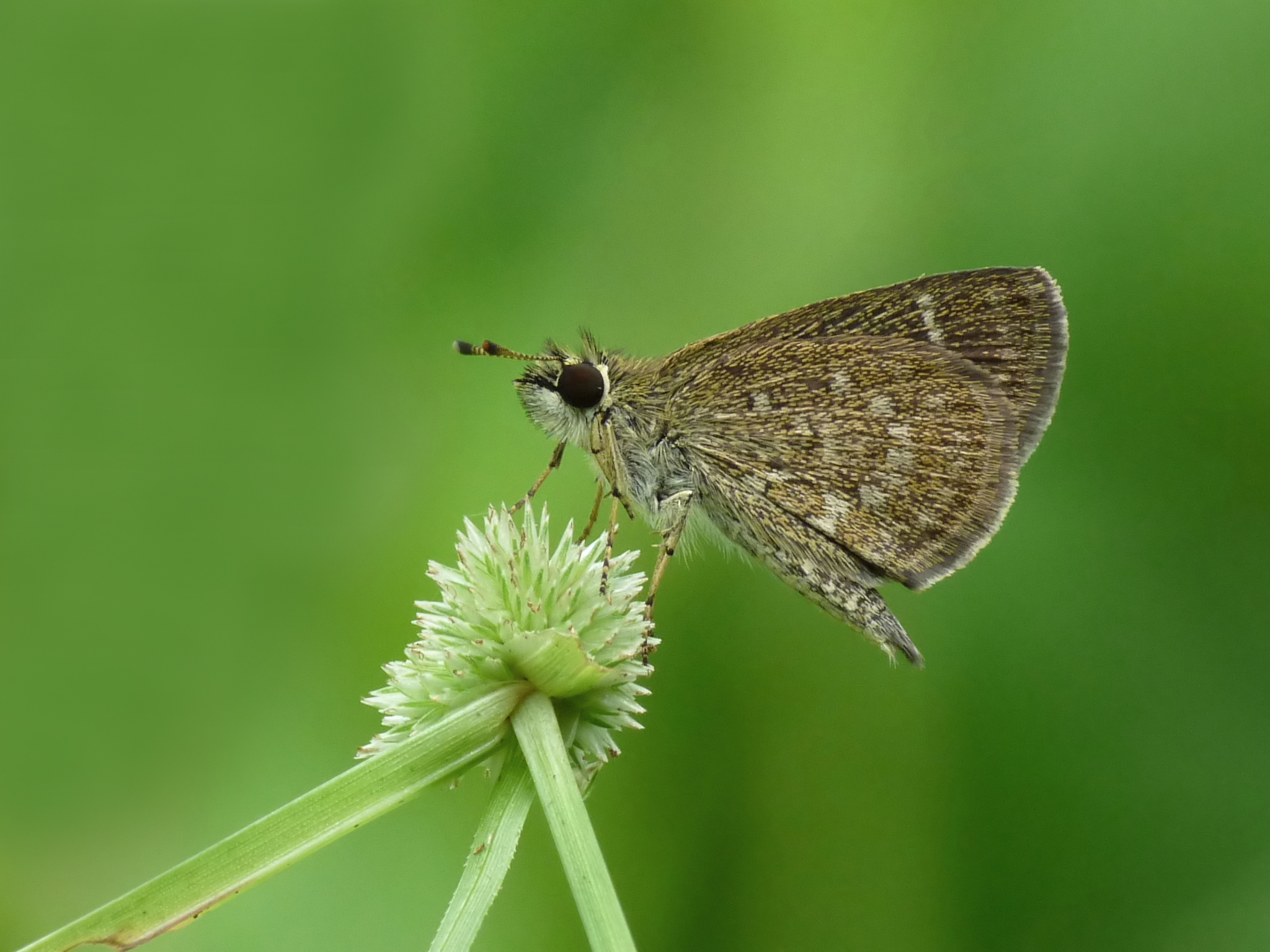
- Pygmy Scrub-hopper, taken in Kerala, India

Scientific classification
- Kingdom: Animalia
- Phylum: Arthropoda
- Class: Insecta
- Order: Lepidoptera
- Family: Hesperiidae
- Subfamily: Hesperiinae
- Tribe: Aeromachini; Tutt, 1906

Genera
- see text

= Aeromachini =

Tribe of butterflies

The Aeromachini are a tribe in the Hesperiinae subfamily of skipper butterflies. As most Hesperiinae have not yet been assigned to tribes, more genera may be placed here eventually.

== Species ==
Recognised genera in the tribe Aeromachini include (incomplete):

- Aeromachus de Nicéville, 1890
- Ampittia Moore, [1881]
- Arnetta Watson, 1893: 81

etc
