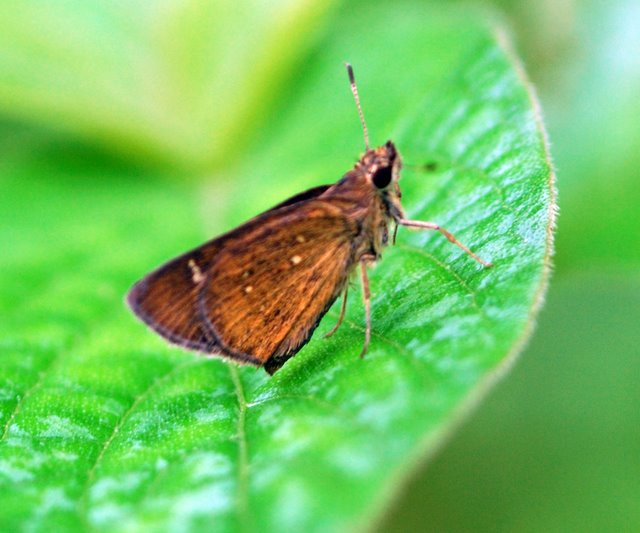
- Arnetta vindhiana

Scientific classification
- Kingdom: Animalia
- Phylum: Arthropoda
- Class: Insecta
- Order: Lepidoptera
- Family: Hesperiidae
- Tribe: Aeromachini
- Genus: Arnetta; Watson, 1893

= Arnetta =

Genus of butterflies

Arnetta is a genus of grass skippers in the family Hesperiidae.

== Species ==
  - Arnetta atkinsoni (Moore, 1878)
  - Arnetta mercara (Evans, 1932)
  - Arnetta verones (Hewitson, 1878)
  - Arnetta vindhiana (Moore, 1884)
