= List of butterflies of China (Hesperiidae) =

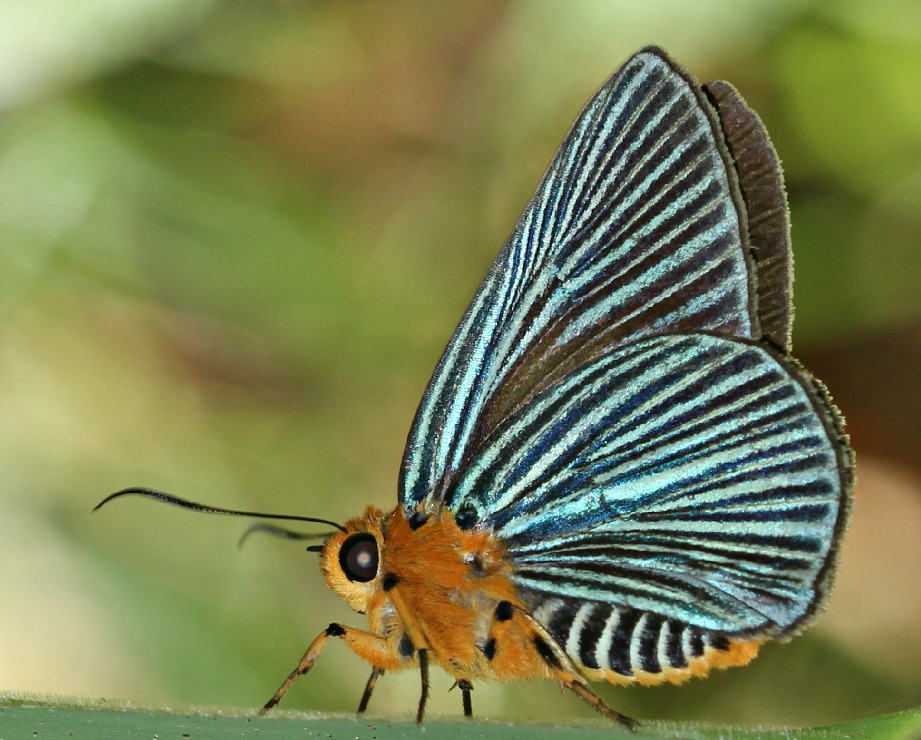
Bibasis amara

This is a list of the butterflies of China belonging to the family Hesperiidae and an index to the species articles. This forms part of the full list of butterflies of China. 365 species or subspecies of Hesperiidae are recorded from China.

== Hesperiidae ==
genus: Abraximorpha

- Abraximorpha davidii (Mabille, 1876)

- A. d. davidii Sichuan, Shaanxi, Hubei, Zhejiang, Jiangxi, Anhui

- Abraximorpha esta Evans, 1949 Yunnan
- Abraximorpha heringi Liu & Gu, 1994 Liu & Gu, 199
- Abraximorpha pieridoides Mell, 1922 Hainan

genus: Aeromachus

- Aeromachus piceus Leech, 1894 Sichuan, Yunnan
- Aeromachus stigmata (Moore, 1878) Yunnan

A. s. obsoleta (Moore, 1878)

- Aeromachus monstrabilus Huang, 2003 Tibet
- Aeromachus dubius Elwes & Edwards, 1897 Hainan, Yunnan
- Aeromachus pseudojhora Lee, 1962 Yunnan
- Aeromachus inachus (Menetries, 1859) Amur
- Aeromachus kali De Niceville, 1895
- Aeromachus catocyanea (Mabille, 1879)

A.c. catocyanea
A.c. amplifascia Huang, 2003 Yunnan
A.c. curvifascia Huang, 2003 Yunnan

- Aeromachus propinquus tali Evans, 1932

genus: Ampittia

- Ampittia trimacula (Leech, 1891) West China
- Ampittia dioscorides (Fabricius, 1793)

A. d. etura (Mabille, 1891 Yunnan

- Ampittia virgata (Leech, 1890)
- Ampittia nanus (Leech, 1890) Ningpo
- Ampittia dalailama (Mabille, 1876) West China, Tibet
- Ampittia sichunanensis Z.G. Wang & Y. Niu, 2002

genus: Arnetta

- Arnetta atkinsoni (Moore, 1878)

genus: Astictopterus

- Astictopterus jama C. & R. Felder, 1860

genus: Badamia

- Badamia exdamationis (Fabricius, 1775)

genus: Baoris

- Baoris farri (Moore, 1878)
- Baoris leechii (Elwes & Edwards, 1897)

genus: Barca

- Barca bicolor (Oberthür, 1896)

genus: Bibasis

- Bibasis gomata lara (Leech, 1894) Yunnan
- Bibasis sena uniformis Elwes & Edwards, 1897 Hainan
- Bibasis amara (Moore, [1866]) Yunnan
- Bibasis aquilina (Speyer, 1879) South China
- Bibasis striata (Hewitson, 1867) West China
- Bibasis unipuncta Lee, 1962 Yunnan

genus: Burara

- Burara amara (Moore, [1866])

genus: Caltoris

- Caltoris bromus (Leech, 1894) Sumatra, Java, Lesser Sundas, Borneo, Palawan, Philippines
- Caltoris cahira (Moore, 1877)

C. c. carina (Evans, 1937) Yunnan
C. c. austeni (Moore, [1884])

- Caltoris septentrionalis Koiwaiya, 1996 China
- Caltoris sirius (Evans, 1926) Tibet
- Caltoris tulsi (de Nicéville, [1884]) India to Malaya, Java, China.

genus: Carcharodus

- Carcharodus flocciferus (Zeller, 1847) Xinjiang

genus: Carterocephalus

- Carterocephalus silvicola (Meigen, 1829) Amurland
- Carterocephalus palaemon (Pallas, 1771)
- Carterocephalus argyrostigma Eversmann, 1851 North-east China
- Carterocephalus dieckmanni Graeser, 1888
- Carterocephalus christophi Grum-Grshimailo, 1891 Tibet
- Carterocephalus alcina Evans, 1939 Yunnan
- Carterocephalus alcinoides Lee, 1962 Yunnan
- Carterocephalus avanti (de Nicéville, 1886) Tibet, West China
- Carterocephalus flavomaculatus Oberthür, 1886 Tibet, West China
- Carterocephalus houangty Oberthür, 1886

C. h. shoka Evans, 1915 Tibet, West China
C. h. jiuzaikouensis Yoshino, 2001 Sichuan
C. h. zorgensis Yoshino, 2003 Sichuan

- Carterocephalus micio Oberthür, 1891 China
- Carterocephalus niveomaculatus Oberthür, 1886 Tibet, West China
- Carterocephalus pulchra Leech, 1891) Tibet, West China
- Carterocephalus abax Oberthür, 1886 Tibet
- Carterocephalus habaensis Yoshino, 1997 Yunnan

genus: Celaenorrhinus

- Celaenorrhinus vietnamicus Devyatkin, 1998 Yunnan
- Celaenorrhinus aspersa Leech, 1891
- Celaenorrhinus nigricans nigricans (de Niceville, 1885)
- Celaenorrhinus dhanada affinis Elwes & Edwards, 1897
- Celaenorrhinus consanguinea consanguinea Leech, 1891
- Celaenorrhinus patula de Nicéville, 1889
- Celaenorrhinus ratna nujiangensis Huang, 2001
- Celaenorrhinus tibetana Mabille, 1876

genus: Cephrenes

- Cephrenes acalle Hopffer, 1874

genus: Choaspes

- Choaspes benjaminii japonica (Murray, 1875) Northwest Yunnan
- Choaspes furcatus Evans, 1932 Hainan
- Choaspes plateni stigmata Evans, 1932 Hainan
- Choaspes xanthopogon (Kollar, [1844]) West China

genus: Coladenia

- Coladenia agni (de Nicéville, [1884]) Hainan
- Coladenia agnioides Elwes & Edwards, 1897 southern China
- Coladenia buchananii (de Nicéville, 1889) (de Nicéville, [1889])
- Coladenia laxmi sobrina Elwes & Edwards, 1897 Hainan
- Coladenia maeniata Oberthür, 1896 Yunnan, China
- Coladenia uemurai H. Huang, 2003 Yunnan

genus: Ctenoptilum

- Ctenoptilum vasava (Moore, [1866])

genus: Daimio

- Daimio tethys (Menetries, 1857) Amurland, Ussuri

- D. t. birmana Evans, 1926 Yunnan

genus: Erionota

- Erionota thrax (Linnaeus, 1767)
- Erionota torus Evans, 1941
- Erionota grandis (Leech, 1890) West China

genus: Erynnis

- Erynnis montanus (Bremer, 1861)
- Erynnis tages (Linnaeus, 1758)
- Erynnis popoviana Nordmann, 1851
- Erynnis pelias (Leech, 1891) West China

genus: Gerosis

- Gerosis phisara (Moore, 1884)

G. p. rex ( Evans, 1949) Yunnan

- Gerosis sinica (C. & R. Felder, 1862) South and Central China, Yunnan

G. S. narada (Moore, 1884) Yunnan

- Gerosis yuani Huang, 2003 Yunnan

genus: Halpe

- Halpe aucma Swinhoe, 1893 Tibet
- Halpe dizangpusa Huang, 2002 Jiu-Hua Shan, Min-Yuan Bamboo Forest.
- Halpe gamma Evans, 1937 China, Formosa
- Halpe handa Evans, 1949 Yunnan
- Halpe hauxwelli Evans, 1937 Yunnan
- Halpe knyvetti Elwes & Edwards, 1897 Tibet
- Halpe kumara Yunnan

H. k. micromacula (H. Huang, 2003) Dulong valley, NW. Yunnan

- Halpe mixta Huang, 2003 Yunnan
- Halpe molta Evans, 1949 Tibet
- Halpe muoi Huang, 1999 Yunnan
- Halpe nephele Leech, 1893 Sichuan,
- Halpe ormenes (Plötz, 1886 Yunnan
- Halpe parakumara Huang, 2003
- Halpe paupera Devyatkin, 2002 Hong Kong
- Halpe porus (Mabille, 1877) West China, Hong Kong, Hainan
- Halpe zema (Hewitson, 1877) Yunnan

genus: Hasora

- Hasora anura (de Niceville, 1889) Yunnan

H. A. china Evans, 1949

- Hasora badra ( Moore, 1857) West China
- Hasora chromus (Cramer, 1782) South China
- Hasora danda Evans, 1949 West China
- Hasora vitta indica Evans, 1932

genus: Hesperia

- Hesperia comma mixta Alphéraky, 1881 Tian-Shan
- Hesperia florinda (Butler, 1878) Amurland, Ussuri

genus: Heteropterus

- Heteropterus morpheus (Pallas, 1771) Amurland

genus: Hyarotis

- Hyarotis adrastus (Cramer, 1780)

genus: Idmon

- Idmon bicolora Fan, X.L & Wang, M., 2007
- Idmon flavata Fan, X.L & Wang, M., 2007
- Idmon fujianana (Chou & Huang, 1994)
- Idmon sinica (H. Huang, 1997)

genus: Isoteinon

- Isoteinon lamprospilus C. & R. Felder,

genus: Leptalina

- Leptalina unicolor (Bremer & Grey, 1853) East China, Amurland

genus: Lobocla

- Lobocla liliana (Atkinson, 1871) Yunnan
- Lobocla bifasciata (Bremer & Grey, 1853) China
- Lobocla simplex (Leech, 1891) West China
- Lobocla germanus (Oberthür, 1886) China
- Lobocla contractus (Leech, 1893)
- Lobocla proximus (Leech, 1891) West China, Tibet
- Lobocla nepos (Oberthür, 1886) West China

genus: Lotongus

- Lotongus saralus (de Nicéville, 1889)

L. s. chinensis Evans, 193 Szechwan
L. s. quinquepunctus Joicey & Talbot, 1921 Hainan

genus: Matapa
genus: Muschampia

- Muschampia staudingeri (Speyer, 1879) West China
- Muschampia proteus (Staudinger, 1886) Tian-Shan
- Muschampia lutulenta (Grum-Grshimailo, 1887) Tian-Shan
- Muschampia kuenlunus (Grum-Grshimailo, 1893) Tian-Shan
- Muschampia protheon (Rambur, 1858) Central China
- Muschampia gigas (Bremer, 1864) East China, Amurland
- Muschampia cribrellum (Eversmann, 1841) Amurland
- Muschampia antonia (Speyer, 1879) Tian-Shan, Tibet

genus: Notocrypta

- Notocrypta clavata (Staudinger, 1889)

N. c. clavata
N. c. theba Evans, 1949 South Yunnan

- Notocrypta paralysos asawa Fruhstorfer, 1911 Hainan
- Notocrypta curvifascia (C. & R. Felder, 1862)
- Notocrypta feisthamelii

N. f. rectifasciata Leech West China
N. f. alysosMoore, 1865

- Notocrypta ariannae Gallo, E. & Bozano, G.C. 2017

genus: Ochlodes

- Ochlodes sylvanus (Esper, 1777)
- Ochlodes venata (Bremer & Grey, 1853) Amurland to Southeast China
- Ochlodes ochracea (Bremer, 1861) Amurland to Southeast China
- Ochlodes subhyalina (Bremer & Grey, 1853)
- Ochlodes thibetana (Oberthür, 1886) Tibet
- Ochlodes bouddha (Mabille, 1876) China
- Ochlodes lanta Evans 1939

genus: Ochus

- Ochus subvittatus Moore, 1878

genus: Odontoptilum

- Odontoptilum angulata angulata (C. Felder, 1862)

genus: Onryza

- Onryza maga (Leech, 1890) China
- Onryza meiktila (de Nicéville, 1891)
- Onryza perbella Hering, 1918 China

genus: Oriens

- Oriens goloides (Moore, [1881]) South China
- Oriens gola (Moore, 1877)

genus: Parnara

- Parnara guttatus Bremer & Grey, 1853

P. g. guttatus (Bremer & Grey, 1853 North China
P. g. mangala (Moore, [1865]) South China

- Parnara batta Evans, 1949 South-east China
- Parnara apostata hulsei Devyatkin & Monastyrskii, 1999 South Yunnan

genus: Pelopidas

- Pelopidas jansonis (Butler, 1878)
- Pelopidas mathias (Fabricius, 1798)
- Pelopidas sinensis (Mabille, 1877)
- Pelopidas grisemarginata Yuan, Zhang & Yuan, 2010

genus: Pithauria
genus: Polytremis

- Polytremis lubricans (Herrich-Schäffer, 1869) Tibet, Yunnan
- Polytremis flavinerva Chou & Zhou, 1994 Guangxi
- Polytremis choui Huang, 1994 Fujian
- Polytremis discreta (Elwes & Edwards, 1897)
- Polytremis mencia (Moore, 1877) Shanghai
- Polytremis kiraizana (Sonan, 1938)
- Polytremis pellucida (Murray, 1875)

P. p. quanta Evans, 1949 Guniujiang, Anhui
P. p. inexpecta Tsukiyama, Chiba & Fujioka, 1997 Zhejiang

- Polytremis theca (Evans, 1937)

P. t. theca (Evans, 1937) Sichuan, Shaanxi
P. t. fukia (Evans, 1940) Fujian, Anhui
P. t. macrotheca Huang, 2003 Yunnan

- Polytremis zina (Evans, 1932)
- Polytremis gigantea Tsukiyama, Chiba & Fujioka, 1997 Sichuan
- Polytremis caerulescens (Mabille, 1876) West China
- Polytremis micropunctata Huang, 2003 Yunnan
- Polytremis nascens (Leech, [1893]) Sichuan
- Polytremis suprema Sugiyama, 1999 Guangxi
- Polytremis matsuii Sugiyama, 1999 Sichuan
- Polytremis gotama Sugiyama, 1999 Yunnan
- Polytremis jigongi J.Q. Zhu, Z.B. Chen & L.Z. Li, 2012

genus: Potanthus

- Potanthus pseudomaesa (Moore, [1881])

P. p. pseudomaesa (Moore, [1881]) Yunnan
P. p. clio (Evans, 1932)

- Potanthus palnia (Evans, 1914)

P. p. palnia (Evans, 1914) Yunnan, Hainan, Guangxi, Fujian, Tibet

- Potanthus trachala phoebe (Evans, 1934) Anhui, Jiangxi, Hunan, Sichuan, Fujian, Hainan

P. t. tytleri (Evans, 1914)

- Potanthus pallidus (Evans, 1932) South China
- Potanthus juno (Evans, 1932) Zhejiang
- Potanthus confucius (C. & R. Felder, 1862)

P. c. confucius (C. & R. Felder, 1862) Zhejiang, Fujian, Anhui, Hubei, Guangdong, Hunan
P. c. dushta (Fruhstorfer, 1911) Hainan

- Potanthus mara Evans, 1932 Tibet
- Potanthus pava pava (Fruhstorfer, 1911) Fujian, Hubei
- Potanthus lydia (Evans, 1934) West China
- Potanthus riefenstahli Huang, 2003 Yunnan
- Potanthus mingo ajax (Evans, 1932) Yunnan
- Potanthus ganda (Fruhstorfer, 1911) Yunnan, Guangxi, Hainan
- Potanthus flava (Murray, 1875) Jilin, Hebei, Shandong, Hunan, Fujian, Yunnan
- Potanthus nesta (Evans, 1934)

P. n. nesta (Evans, 1934) Yunnan
P. n. omeia Lee, 1962 Sichuan

- Potanthus taqini Huang, 2001 Tibet
- Potanthus tibetana Huang, 2002 Tibet, Yunnan
- Potanthus yani Huang, 2002 Anhui, Fujian
- Potanthus rectifasciata (Elwes & Edwards, 1897)

genus: Pseudoborbo

- Pseudoborbo bevani (Moore, 1878)

genus: Pseudocoladenia

- Pseudocoladenia dan (Fabricius, 1787)
- Pseudocoladenia dea (Leech, 1894) South China (Zhejiang, Anhui, Hubei, Sichuan)
- Pseudocoladenia festa (Evans, 1949) Southwest China (Yunnan, Sichuan)
- Pseudocoladenia fatua (Evans, 1949) Tibet

genus: Pyrgus

- Pyrgus alpinus (Erschoff, 1874) West China
- Pyrgus maculatus thibetanus (Oberthür, 1891) West China
- Pyrgus malvae (Linnaeus, 1758)
- Pyrgus alveus (Hübner, 1802)
- Pyrgus serratulae (Rambur, 1839) China
- Pyrgus alveus Hübner, [1800-1803]

P. a. reverdini (Oberthür, 1912) Ta-tsien-lou, Sichuan
P. a. schansiensis Reverdin, 1915

- Pyrgus speyeri (Staudinger, 1887) Amurland
- Pyrgus oberthueri (Leech, 1891) West China, Tibet
- Pyrgus bieti (Oberthür, 1886) West China, Tibet

genus: Sarangesa

- Sarangesa dasahara (Moore, [1866])

genus: Satarupa

- Satarupa nymphalis (Speyer, 1879)
- Satarupa splendens Tytler, 1914 Yunnan
- Satarupa valentini Oberthür, 1921 Tibet
- Satarupa monbeigi Oberthür, 1921

genus: Scobura

- Scobura cephaloides (de Nicéville, [1889]) Hainan
- Scobura coniata Hering, 1918

genus: Sebastonyma

- Sebastonyma medoensis Lee, 1979

S. m. medoensis
S. m. albostriata H. Huang, 2003 Nujiang valley, N.W. Yunnan

genus: Seseria
genus: Sovia

- Sovia lucasii (Mabille, 1876)

S. l. magna Evans, 1932

- Sovia separata ( Moore, 1882) Tibet
- Sovia albipectus (de Nicéville, 1891)
- Sovia subflava (Leech, 1894) West Sichuan, Northwest Yunnan
- Sovia grahami (Evans, 1926)

S. g. grahami Tibet
S. g. miliaohuae Huang, 2003 Northwest Yunnan

- Sovia fangi Huang & Wu, 2003 Northwest Yunnan

genus: Spialia

- Spialia galba chenga Evans, 1956 Hainan
- Spialia sertorius (Hoffmannsegg, 1804) Tibet, Amurland
- Spialia orbifer lugens (Staudinger, 1886) Tian-Shan

genus: Stimula

- Stimula swinhoei swinhoei Elwes & Edwards, 1897

genus: Suastus

- Suastus gremius (Fabricius, 1798)
- Suastus minuta (Moore, 1877)

genus: Tagiades

- Tagiades litigiosa Moschler, 1878 Hainan, Yunnan
- Tagiades menaka (Moore, [1866]) Hainan

genus: Taractrocera

- Taractrocera flavoides Leech, 1894
- Taractrocera tilda Evans, 1934

genus: Telicota

- Telicota colon (Fabricius, 1775)
- Telicota augias (Linnaeus, 1763)
- Telicota linna Evans, 1949
- Telicota ancilla (Herrich-Schäffer, 1869)

genus: Thymelicus

- Thymelicus lineola (Ochsenheimer, 1808) Amurland
- Thymelicus alaica (Filipjev, 1931) Tian-Shan
- Thymelicus leonina (Butler, 1878) South China, Amurland
- Thymelicus sylvatica (Bremer, 1861) South China, Amurland
- Thymelicus nervulata (Mabille, 1876) West China

genus: Thoressa many

- Thoressa baileyi (South, 1914) Southwest China

T. b. baileyi (South, 1913)

- Thoressa bivitta (Oberthür, 1886) West Sichuan, North Yunnan
- Thoressa blanchardii blanchardii (Oberthür, 1886) West Sichuan
- Thoressa fusca fusca (Elwes, [1893]) Southwest China Yunnan, Tibet

T.f. fusca
T.f. senna Evans, 1937

- Thoressa gupta gupta (de Niceville, 1886) Sichuan, Guangdong, Yunnan

T.g. gupta
T.g. nujiangensis (H. Huang, 2003) Nujiang valley, Northwest Yunnan

- Thoressa hyrie (de Niceville, 1891) Tibet
- Thoressa kuata (Evans, 1940) Southeast China (Fujian, Zhejiang)
- Thoressa latris (Leech, 1893) Southwest China (Sichuan, Yunnan)
- Thoressa luanchuanensis (Wang & Niu, 2002) Central China (Henan, Hubei)
- Thoressa masuriensis (Moore, 1878) West China (North Yunnan, West Sichuan)

T. m. tali (Swinhoe, [1912])
T. m. cuneomaculata Murayama, 1995

- Thoressa pandita (de Niceville, 1885) Southwest China, Southeast Tibet
- Thoressa serena (Evans, 1937) Sichuan, Yunnan
- Thoressa submacula (Leech, 1890) West China
- Thoressa viridis (Huang, 2003) Yunnan
- Thoressa xiaoqingae Huang & Zhan, 2004 Guangdong, Hainan
- Thoressa yingqii (Huang, 2011) Central China (Shaanxi)
- Thoressa zinnia (Evans, 1939) North Yunnan

genus: Udaspes
genus: Zographetus

- Zographetus satwa (de Nicéville, [1884]) Hainan
- Zographetus hainanensis Fang & Wan, 2007 China (Hainan)
- Zographetus doxus Eliot, 1959 China (Hainan)
- Zographetus ogygioides Elwes & Edwards, 1897
- Zographetus pangi Fan & Wang, 2007
