= List of butterflies of Hong Kong =

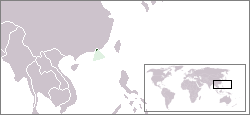
Location of Hong Kong, which is inside the Indomalayan realm

This is a list of butterflies of Hong Kong. About 250 species are known from Hong Kong. One subspecies is endemic to the region.

== Hesperiidae ==
=== Coeliadinae ===
- Bibasis gomata lalita
- Bibasis oedipodea belesis
- Bibasis jaina
- Hasora badra badra
- Hasora vitta indica
- Hasora chromus chromus
- Hasora taminatus malayana
- Hasora anura china
- Badamia exclamationis
- Choaspes benjaminii japonicus
- Choaspes hemixanthus furcatus

=== Pyrginae ===
- Celaenorrhinus leucocera
- Gerosis phisara
- Tagiades litigiosa litigiosa
- Tagiades menaka
- Abraximorpha davidii esta
- Odontoptilum angulatum angulatum
- Caprona alida alida

=== Hesperiinae ===
- Ampittia dioscorides etura
- Ampittia virgata
- Aeromachus jhora
- Aeromachus pygmaeus
- Thoressa monastyrskyi
- Halpe porus
- Halpe paupera walthewi
- Astictopterus jama chinensis
- Iambrix salsala salsala
- Notocrypta curvifascia curvifascia
- Notocrypta paralysos
- Udaspes folus
- Suastus gremius gremius
- Isoteinon lamprospilus lamprospilus
- Hyarotis adrastus praba
- Erionota torus
- Matapa aria
- Taractrocera ceramas thelma
- Taractrocera maevius maevius
- Potanthus trachala trachala
- Potanthus pseudomaesa clio
- Potanthus pava pava
- Potanthus confucius confucius
- Telicota colon stinga
- Telicota besta besta
- Telicota ancilla horisha
- Telicota ohara formosana
- Cephrenes acalle
- Parnara guttata
- Parnara ganga
- Parnara bada bada
- Parnara apostata
- Zographetus satwa
- Borbo cinnara
- Borbo bevani
- Pelopidas agna agna
- Pelopidas mathias oberthueri
- Pelopidas subochracea barneyi
- Pelopidas assamensis
- Pelopidas conjunctus conjunctus
- Polytremis lubricans lubricans
- Baoris farri farri
- Caltoris bromus bromus
- Caltoris cahira

== Papilionidae ==
=== Papilioninae ===
- Lamproptera curius walkeri
- Graphium sarpedon sarpedon
- Graphium cloanthus clymenus
- Graphium doson axion
- Graphium agamemnon agamemnon
- Pathysa antiphates antiphates
- Papilio (Chilasa) agestor
- Papilio (Chilasa) clytia
- Papilio xuthus xuthus
- Papilio machaon
- Papilio demoleus demoleus
- Papilio helenus helenus
- Papilio polytes polytes
- Papilio memnon agenor
- Papilio protenor protenor
- Papilio bianor bianor
- Papilio dialis
- Papilio paris paris
- Troides helena spilotia
- Troides aeacus aeacus
- Pachliopta aristolochiae goniopeltis
- Byasa alcinous manonensis

== Pieridae ==
=== Pierinae ===
- Delias hyparete hierte
- Delias pasithoe pasithoe
- Delias acalis acalis
- Delias belladonna kwangtungensis
- Leptosia nina nina
- Prioneris thestylis formosana
- Prioneris philonome clemanthe
- Pieris canidia canidia
- Pieris rapae crucivora
- Cepora nerissa nerissa
- Appias albina darada
- Appias lyncida eleonora
- Ixias pyrene pyrene
- Hebomoia glaucippe glaucippe

=== Coliadinae ===
- Dercas verhuelli verhuelli
- Colias erate
- Catopsilia pyranthe pyranthe
- Catopsilia pomona pomona
- Eurema brigitta rubella
- Eurema laeta betheseba
- Eurema hecabe hecabe
- Eurema blanda hylama

== Lycaenidae ==
=== Miletinae ===
- Allotinus drumila aphthonius
- Miletus chinensis chinensis
- Taraka hamada isona

=== Curetinae ===
- Curetis dentata denta

=== Aphnaeinae ===
- Cigaritis lohita formosana
- Cigaritis syama peguana

=== Theclinae ===
- Arhopala bazalus turbata
- Arhopala pseudocentaurus pirithous
- Arhopala birmana birmana
- Arhopala paramuta paramuta
- Arhopala rama ramosa
- Mahathala ameria hainani
- Horaga albimacula triumphalis
- Horaga onyx moltrechti
- Iraota timoleon timolecon
- Pratapa deva devula
- Tajuria cippus malcolmi
- Tajuria maculata
- Eliotia jalindra
- Creon cleobis cleobis
- Remelana jangala mudra
- Ancema ctesia agalla
- Deudorix epijarbas menesicles
- Artipe eryx eryx
- Sinthusa chandrana grotei
- Sinthusa nasaka
- Rapala manea schistacea

=== Lycaeninae ===
- Heliophorus epicles phoenicoparyphus

=== Polyommatinae ===
- Nacaduba berenice
- Nacaduba kurava euplea
- Jamides bochus bochus
- Jamides celeno celeno
- Jamides alecto alocina
- Catochrysops strabo strabo
- Catochrysops panormus exiguus
- Lampides boeticus
- Leptotes plinius
- Castalius rosimon
- Pseudozizeeria maha serica
- Zizeeria karsandra karsandra
- Zizina otis otis
- Zizula hylax
- Famegana alsulus eggletoni
- Everes argiades
- Everes lacturnus rileyi
- Tongeia filicaudis
- Pithecops corvus
- Neopithecops zalmora zalmora; N. z. dolona
- Megisba malaya sikkima; M. m. volubilis
- Acytolepis puspa gisca
- Udara dilecta dilecta
- Udara albocaerulea albocaerulea
- Celastrina lavendularis limbata
- Euchrysops cnejus cnejus
- Chilades lajus leucofasciatus
- Luthrodes pandava pandava
- Freyeria putli

== Riodinidae ==
=== Nemeobiidae ===
- Zemeros flegyas flegyas
- Dodona egeon egeon
- Abisara echerius echerius

== Nymphalidae ==
=== Satyrinae ===
- Melanitis leda leda
- Melanitis phedima muskata
- Lethe chandica
- Lethe confusa confusa
- Lethe europa beroe
- Lethe rohria permagnis
- Lethe verma stenopa
- Neope muirheadii muirheadii
- Elymnias hypermnestra hainana
- Mycalesis mineus mineus
- Mycalesis zonata
- Ypthima baldus baldus
- Ypthima lisandra lisandra
- Ypthima norma norma
- Ypthima imitans
- Ypthima praenubila praenubila

=== Morphinae ===
- Faunis eumeus eumeus
- Discophora sondaica tulliana

=== Charaxinae ===
- Polyura athamas athamas
- Polyura nepenthes nepenthes
- Charaxes bernardus bernardus
- Charaxes bernardus bernardus

=== Biblidinae ===
- Ariadne ariadne alterna

=== Heliconiinae ===
- Cupha erymanthis erymanthis
- Phalanta phalantha phalantha
- Vagrans egista brixia
- Cirrochroa tyche mithila
- Argynnis hyperbius hyperbius
- Cethosia biblis phanaroia
- Acraea issoria issoria

=== Nymphalinae ===
- Vanessa indica indica
- Vanessa cardui
- Kaniska canace canace
- Polygonia c-aureum c-aureum
- Symbrenthia lilaea lunica
- Junonia almana almana
- Junonia atlites atlites
- Junonia lemonias lemonias
- Junonia iphita iphita
- Junonia hierta hierta
- Junonia orithya orithya
- Hypolimnas anomala anomala
- Hypolimnas bolina kezia
- Hypolimnas misippus
- Kallima inachus chinensis

=== Limenitidinae ===
- Neptis hylas hylas
- Neptis clinia susruta
- Neptis soma tayalina
- Neptis miah nolana
- Phaedyma columella columella
- Pantoporia hordonia
- Athyma perius perius
- Athyma nefte seitzi
- Athyma cama
- Athyma selenophora leucophryne
- Athyma ranga serica
- Parathyma sulpitia
- Parasarpa dudu hainanensis
- Moduza procris procris
- Euthalia lubentina lubentina
- Euthalia phemius seitzi
- Euthalia aconthea aditha
- Euthalia niepelti
- Lexias pardalis

=== Cyrestinae ===
- Dichorragia nesimachus formosanus
- Cyrestis thyodamas chinensis

=== Apaturinae ===
- Rohana parisatis staurakius
- Hestina assimilis assimilis
- Sephisa chandra androdamas
- Euripus nyctelius

=== Danainae ===
- Parantica aglea melanoides
- Parantica sita sita
- Parantica swinhoei szechuana
- Ideopsis similis similis
- Tirumala limniace limniace
- Tirumala septentrionis septentronis
- Danaus chrysippus chrysippus
- Danaus genutia genutia
- Idea leuconoe
- Euploea midamus midamus
- Euploea sylvester swinhoei
- Euploea mulciber mulciber
- Euploea core amymone
