= List of butterflies of China =

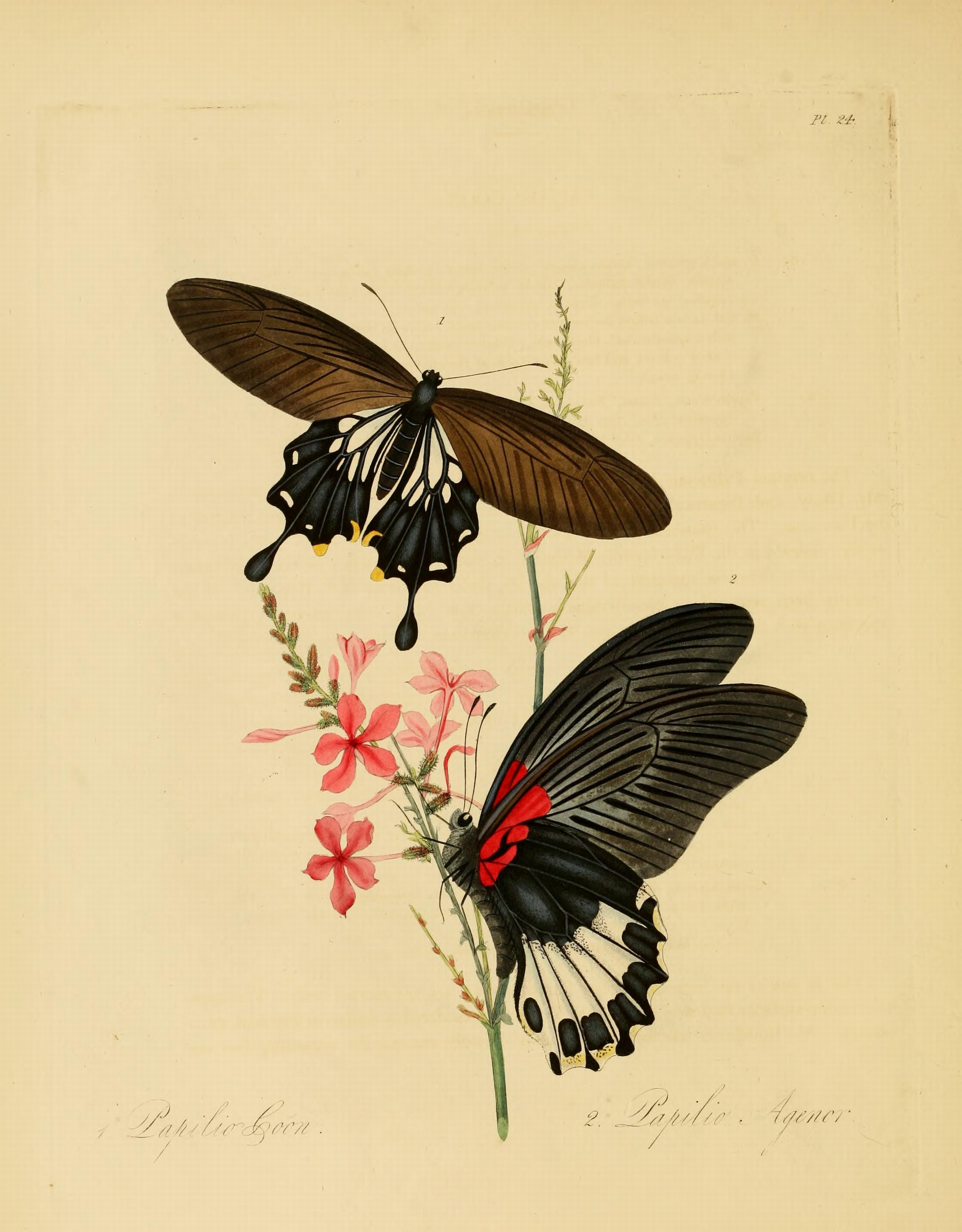
Plate from Edward Donovan's An Epitome of the Natural History of the Insects of China, 1838

There are 1,317 recorded species of butterflies found in China. The geography of China is diverse. Temperate North China is located in Central Asia and the Palearctic realm. The rest of China, including the tropical South China (with Hainan, Hong Kong), and Taiwan belong to the Indomalayan realm. In many parts of China the Palearctic and Oriental faunas overlap.

== History of study ==
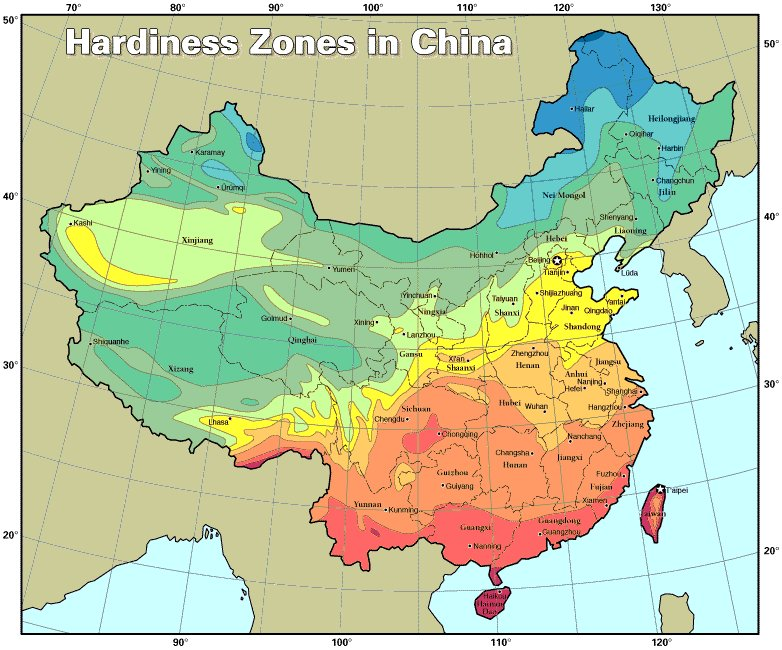
Far northern China has a subarctic climate and shares many of its butterflies with Siberia. Southern China belongs to Indomalayan realm and shares subtropical species with Indochina. Most of Hainan Island and parts of the extreme southern fringes of Yunnan have a tropical climate.

Early work on the butterfly fauna of China was undertaken by European entomologists: Edward Donovan, John Henry Leech, Henry John Elwes, Charles Oberthür, Ernest Grandidier, Otto Staudinger, Hans Fruhstorfer, Alfred Otto Herz, Arthur Poujade, Pierre Joseph Michel Lorquin, Paul Mabille, Sergei Alphéraky and Rudolf Püngeler furnish examples. Thousands of plant, insect and mammal species were described in the 19th century by scientists of the Muséum national d'histoire naturelle, Paris, in connection with permanent settlements of missionaries of the Missions étrangères de Paris in north-west Yunnan. The extreme south of Yunnan province, just to the north of Laos has tropical forests and the biological diversity of this area is the most abundant in China. In the early 20th century the faunal studies of European workers on China were summarised in Die Gross-Schmetterlinge der Erde edited by Adalbert Seitz. In the 1930s, Wong Chi-yu, Chou Io, and Miss NgYukchau published reports on butterfly species in Zhejiang and Guangdong provinces, the Chuankang Area, and Ningbo, respectively. Rudolf Mell, director of the German-Chinese Middle School at Canton (Guangzhou) published notes on butterflies in Beiträge zur Fauna sinica (Deut. ent. Zeit.) and other works. From the 1960s to the 1980s, Lee Chuan-lung published revisionary works and descriptions of a number of new species of butterflies from China. Some of these were collected during Sino-Soviet expeditions to Chinese Central Asia when Chinese entomologists worked with their Russian counterparts. Iconographia Insectorum Shensi-corum: Rhopalocera was published in 1978 by the then Northwestern College of Agriculture. Following that, books on the butterfly fauna of Gansu, Hunan (Chenzhou), Guangxi, Guangdong (Lingnan), Henan and Zhejiang were published and also checklists of the butterflies of Jiangxi, Shandong, Ningxia and Xinjiang. In 1992, The Atlas of Chinese Butterflies was published by Lee Chuan-lung. In 1994, Monographia Rhopalocerorum Sinensium edited by Chou Io was published, summarising studies by forty-nine lepidopterists from all over China, including Hong Kong and Taiwan. In 1996 the Butterfly Association of the Entomological Society of China was founded. It is based in the Northwestern Agricultural University. Chou Io revised Monographia Rhopalocerorum Sinensium in 1998 in Classification and Identification of Chinese Butterflies Field Identification Guide. Other and more recent work appears in Acta Zootaxonomica Sinica

== Lists per family ==
- Papilionidae - swallowtail butterflies
- Hesperiidae - skipper butterflies
- Pieridae - whites and yellows
- Lycaenidae - blues, hairstreaks and gossamer-winged butterflies
- Riodinidae - metalmarks
- Nymphalidae - brush-footed butterflies

== See also ==
- Geography of China
- Provinces of China
- List of ecoregions in China
- Kunming Institute of Zoology
- List of butterflies of the Korean Peninsula
- List of butterflies of Indochina
- List of butterflies of Taiwan
- Félix Biet collected for Oberthür
- Armand David collected for Oberthür
- Théodore Monbeig collected for Oberthür
- Père Jean Marie Delavay collected for Oberthür
- Auguste Desgodins collected for Oberthür
- Théodore Monbeig collected for Oberthür
- Gustave Arthur Poujade
- André Soulié
