= Monbeig =

Monbeig is a surname. Notable people with the surname include:

- Pierre Monbeig (1908–1987), French geographer
- Théodore Monbeig (1875–1914), French Catholic missionary and botanist
