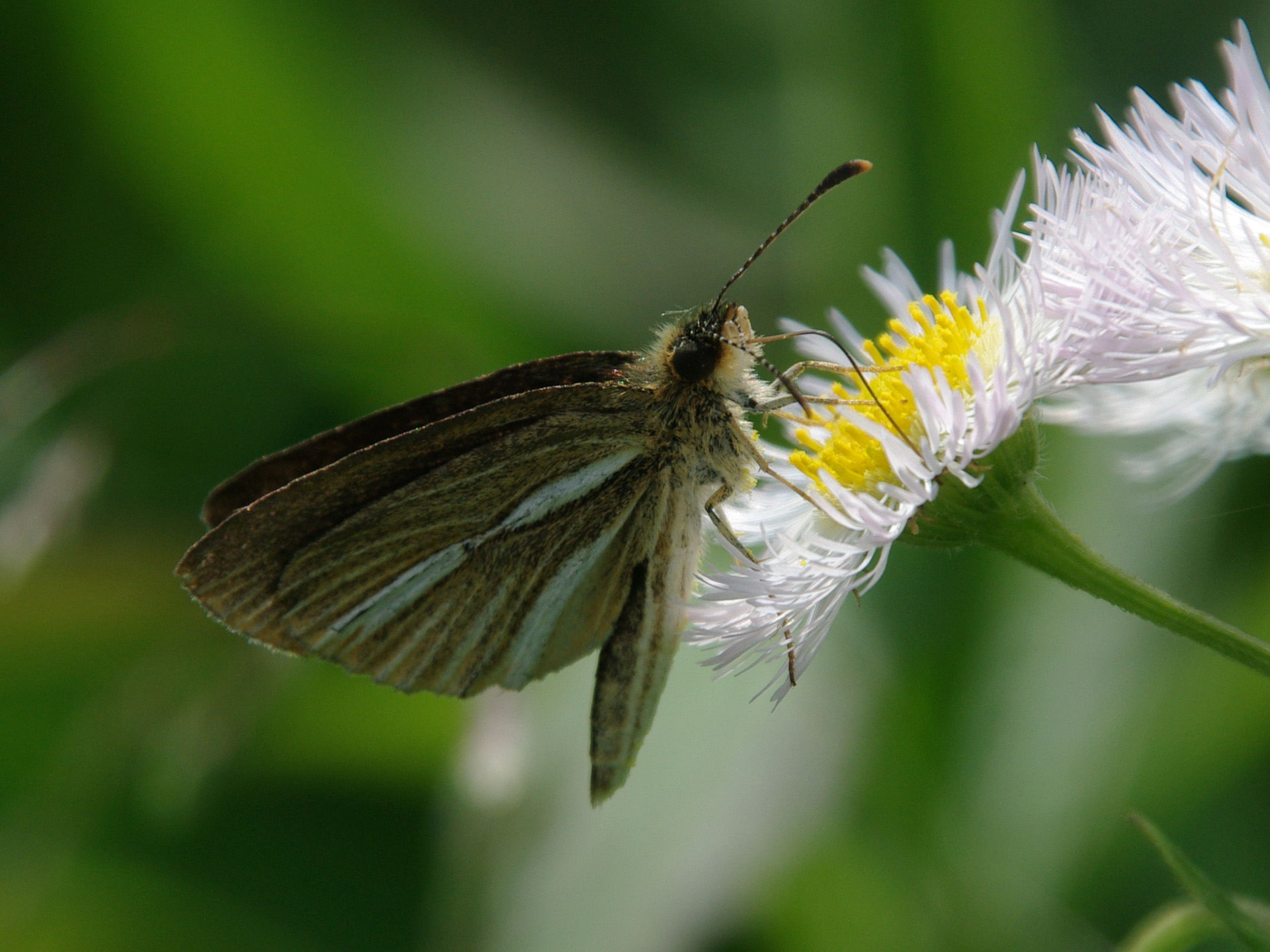

Scientific classification
- Kingdom: Animalia
- Phylum: Arthropoda
- Class: Insecta
- Order: Lepidoptera
- Family: Hesperiidae
- Subfamily: Heteropterinae
- Genus: Leptalina; Mabille, 1904
- Species: L. unicolor

Binomial name
- Leptalina unicolor (Bremer & Grey, [1852])

Synonyms
- Steropes unicolor Bremer & Grey, [1852]; Steropes ornatus Bremer, 1861

= Leptalina =

Genus of butterflies

Leptalina is a genus of skippers in the family Hesperiidae. It contains only one species, Leptalina unicolor, which is found in eastern China, Korea, Japan and the Russian Far East (Amur). The habitat consists of humid meadows. The species is endangered by habitat decline, and worldwide populations have decreased significantly.

Adults are on wing from June to July.

The larvae feed on various grasses, including Miscanthus sacchariflorus, Setaria and Phragmites species.
