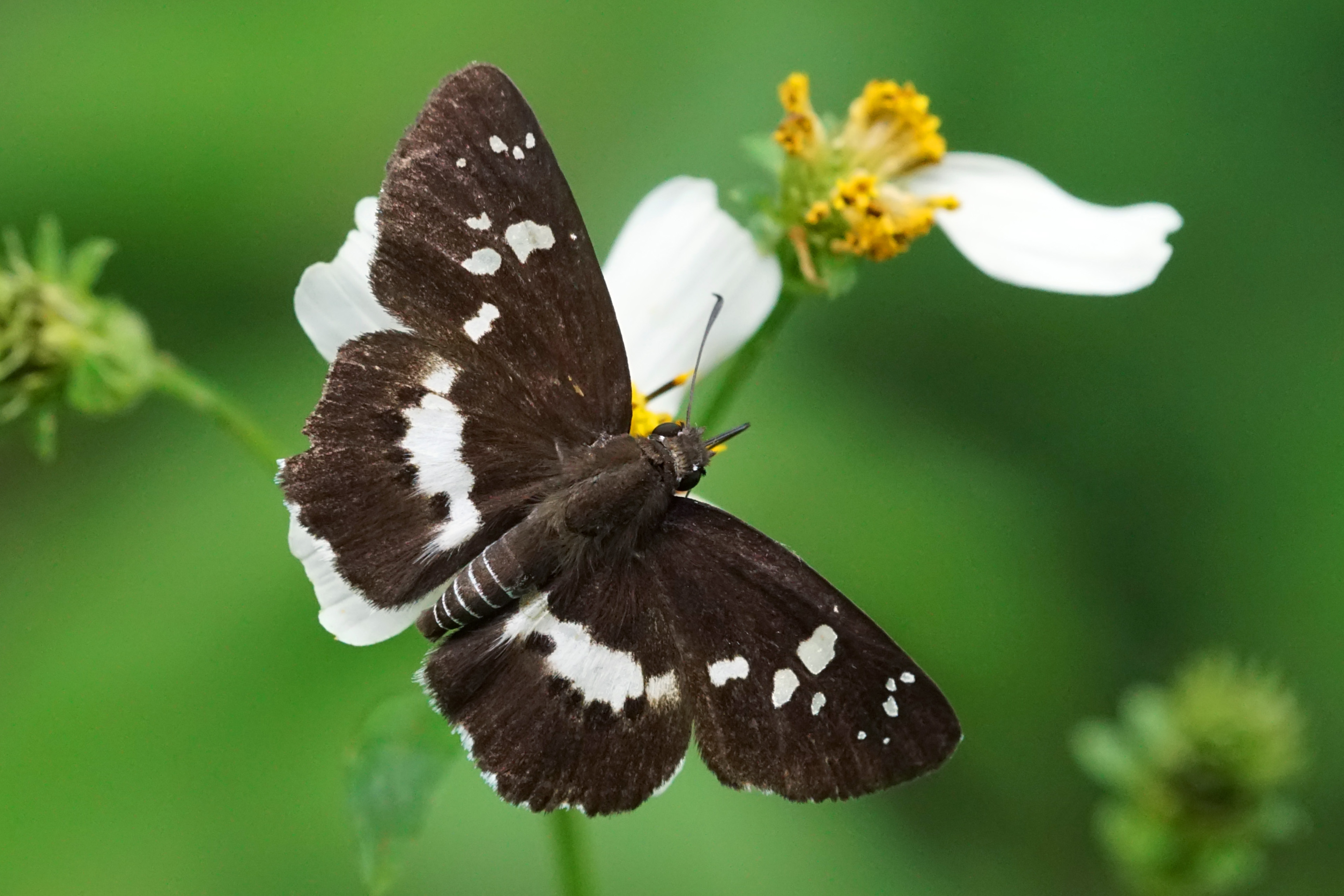
- Daimio tethys niitakana

Scientific classification
- Domain: Eukaryota
- Kingdom: Animalia
- Phylum: Arthropoda
- Class: Insecta
- Order: Lepidoptera
- Family: Hesperiidae
- Genus: Tagiades
- Subgenus: Daimio; Murray, 1875

= Daimio (butterfly) =

Genus of butterflies

Daimio is a subgenus of Palearctic spread-winged skippers in the family Hesperiidae.
