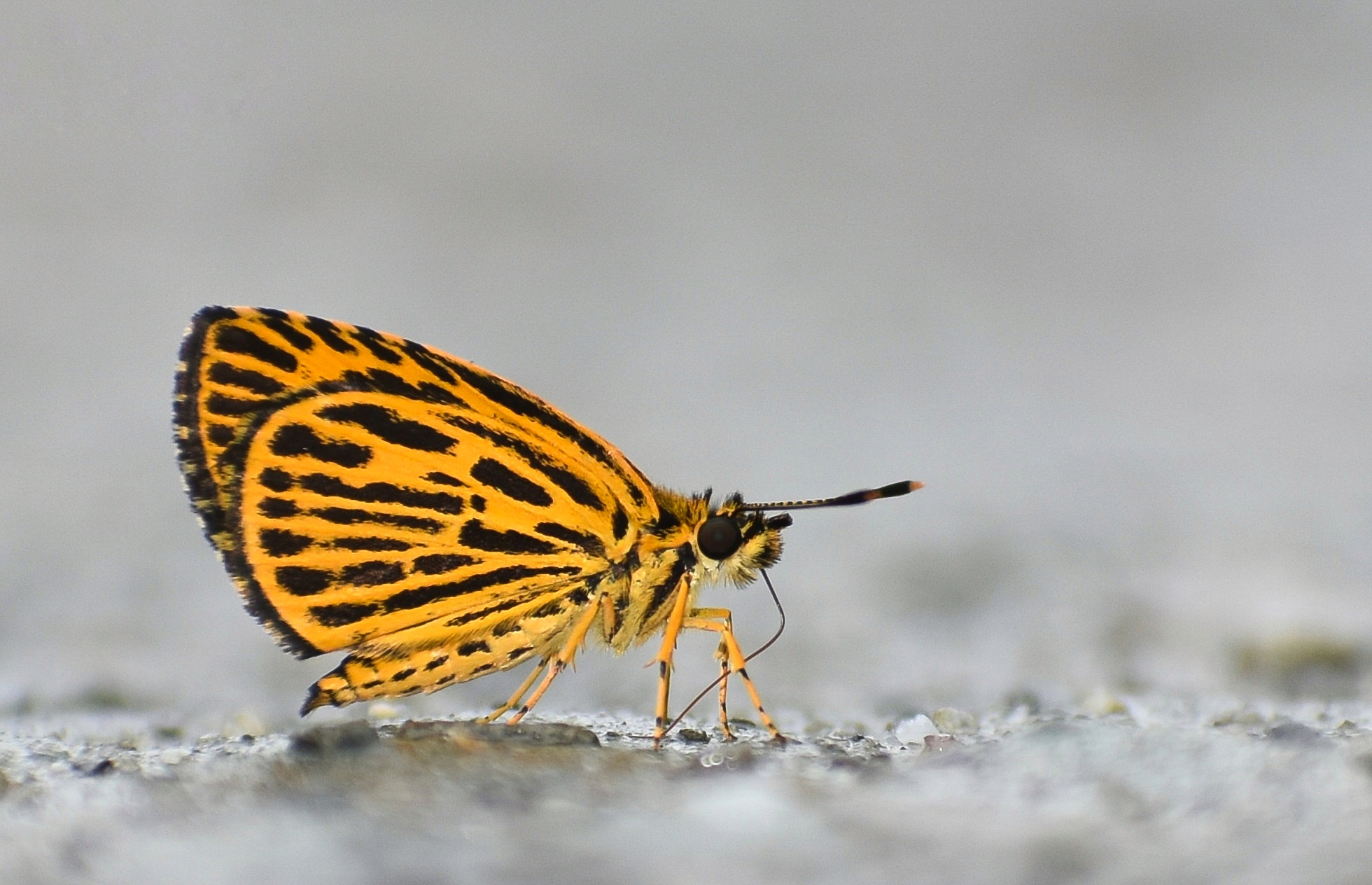

Scientific classification
- Kingdom: Animalia
- Phylum: Arthropoda
- Clade: Pancrustacea
- Class: Insecta
- Order: Lepidoptera
- Family: Hesperiidae
- Genus: Ampittia; Moore, 1882
- Species: A. subvittatus

Binomial name
- Ampittia subvittatus Moore, 1878

Synonyms
- Cyclopides subvittatus Moore, 1878; Ochus subvittatus (Moore, 1878)

= Ampittia subvittatus =

Species of butterfly

Ampittia subvittatus, the tiger hopper, is a species in the genus Ampittia of the family Hesperiidae. The species was first described by Frederic Moore in 1878. It is found in the Khasi Hills and Naga Hills of India, Myanmar, Thailand, Laos, Vietnam and Yunnan.

== Wingspan ==
The wingspan of the tiger hopper is 20–25 mm (1–1 in).

== Subspecies ==
- Ampittia subvittatus subvittatus (Moore, 1878)
- Ampittia subvittatus subradiatus (Moore, 1878) – Khasi tiger hopper

== Distribution ==
This species is found from Sikkim to Arunachal Pradesh in India, and in Bhutan, Nepal and several places in Myanmar.

== Description ==
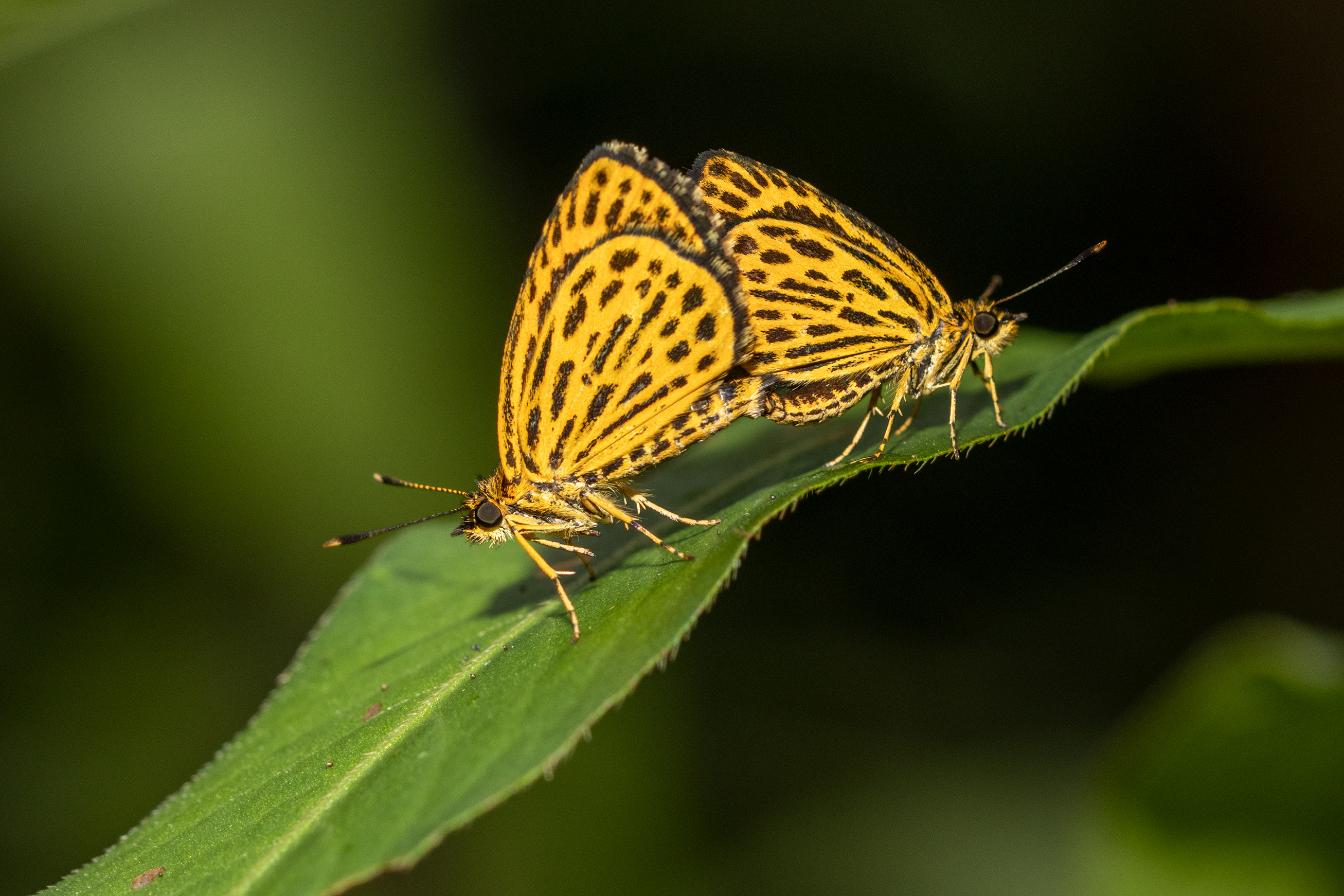
Mating pair of tiger hopper

Both wings of upside are iridescent Van Dyke brown. In the forewing, several bright yellow streaks divided by the veins placed obliquely beyond the end of the cell; or even immaculate; with all the cilia are lighter yellow than the spots when present and broadly interested with the brown opposite to the end of the veins. In underside, both wings and the bases of the cilia are rich in Van Dyke brown throughout with darker than the above; veined and margined with rich chrome yellow.

In the forewing the costal margin is little beyond its middle, the costal and subcostal nervules to the costal and outer margins. The extremity of the third median nervule veined, and the external machines, and the extremity of the third median nervule veined, and the outer margin bordered, with chrome-yellow, so that the wings may be described as increasingly bordered from base to the apex, and increasingly from the apex to the sub-median nervule with yellow streaked with dark brown.

The hindwing is yellow bordered, with the yellow veins broadly pointed on both sides with yellow.

The upperside of the head, thorax and the abdomen are dark Van Dyke brown with a yellow underside.

== Habit and habitat ==
The tiger hopper is mostly found in the high evergreen forests that experience ample rainfall. It prefers to fly close to the ground. The flight is weak and follow the fluttering pattern. Shaded or semi-shaded forest tracks are its preferred area. Males are sometimes found puddling in damp soil or wet rock. Females are hardly seen. They also spotted basking in the sun, opening their wings.

== Seasonality ==
The flight period for the tiger hopper is from April to October.
