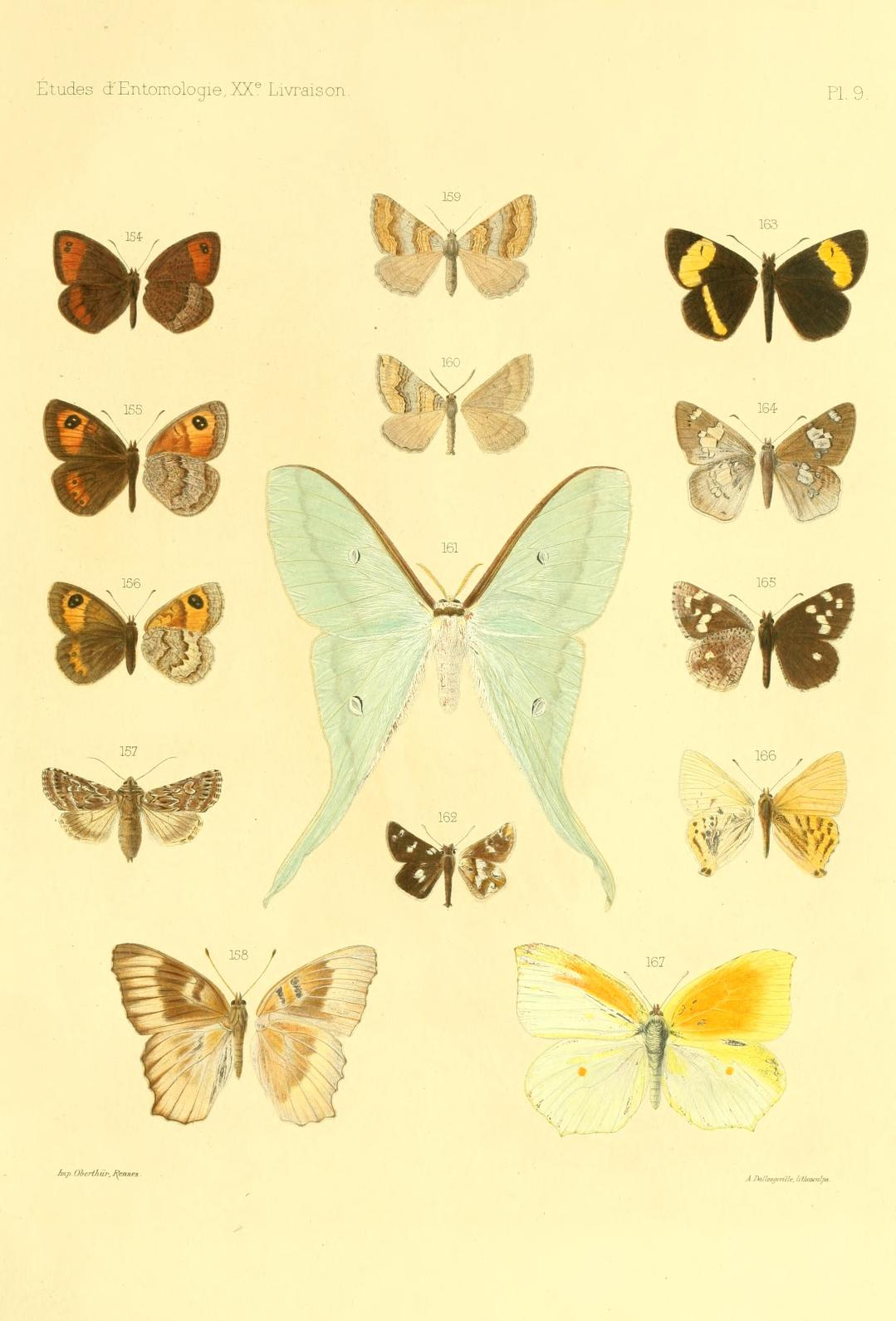
- In Oberthur Études d'entomologie1896 (figure 163)

Scientific classification
- Kingdom: Animalia
- Phylum: Arthropoda
- Class: Insecta
- Order: Lepidoptera
- Family: Hesperiidae
- Genus: Barca
- Species: B. bicolor

Binomial name
- Barca bicolor (Oberthür, 1896)

Synonyms
- Dejeania bicolor Oberthür, 1896

= Barca bicolor =

Species of butterfly

Barca bicolor is a species of skipper in the family Hesperiidae and is found in Tibet and Yunnan.
