= Théodore Monbeig =

French Catholic missionary and botanist (1875-1914)

The Reverend Jean-Théodore Monbeig-Andrieu MEP
- Priest
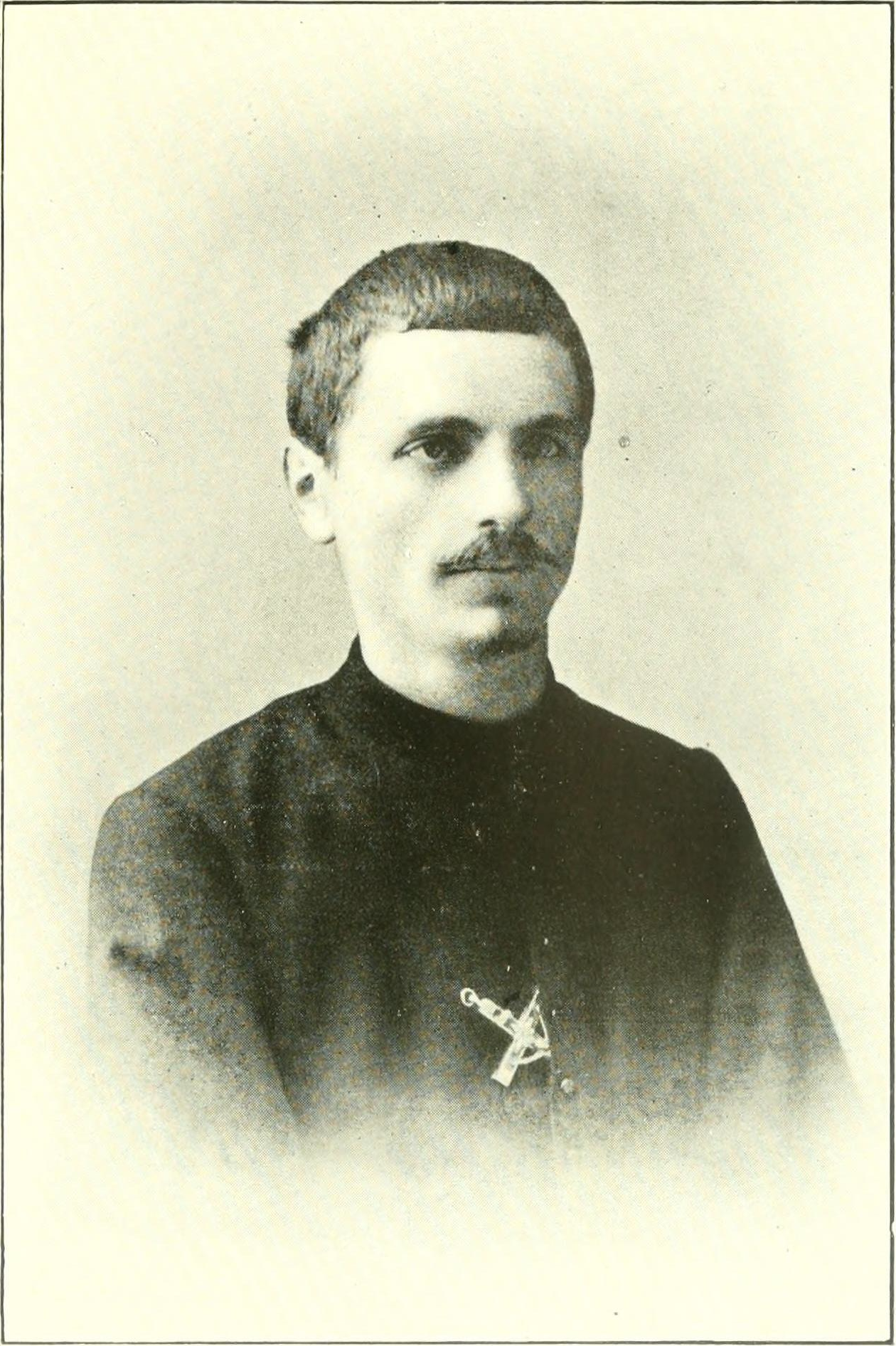
- Church: Catholic Church
- Diocese: Apostolic Vicariate of Tibet
- Installed: 1900
- Term ended: 1914

Orders
- Ordination: 25 February 1899

Personal details
- Born: 22 October 1875 Salies-de-Béarn, Pyrénées-Atlantiques, France
- Died: 12 June 1914 (aged 38) Litang, Sichuan, China
- Denomination: Catholic
- Occupation: Missionary

Jean-Théodore Monbeig-Andrieu, MEP (22 October 1875 in Salies-de-Béarn – 12 June 1914 in Litang) was a French Catholic missionary and botanist who collected plants for the Paris Natural History Museum from northern Yunnan where he was posted. He also collected butterflies for Charles Oberthür. He was a member of the Paris Foreign Missions Society.

== Career ==
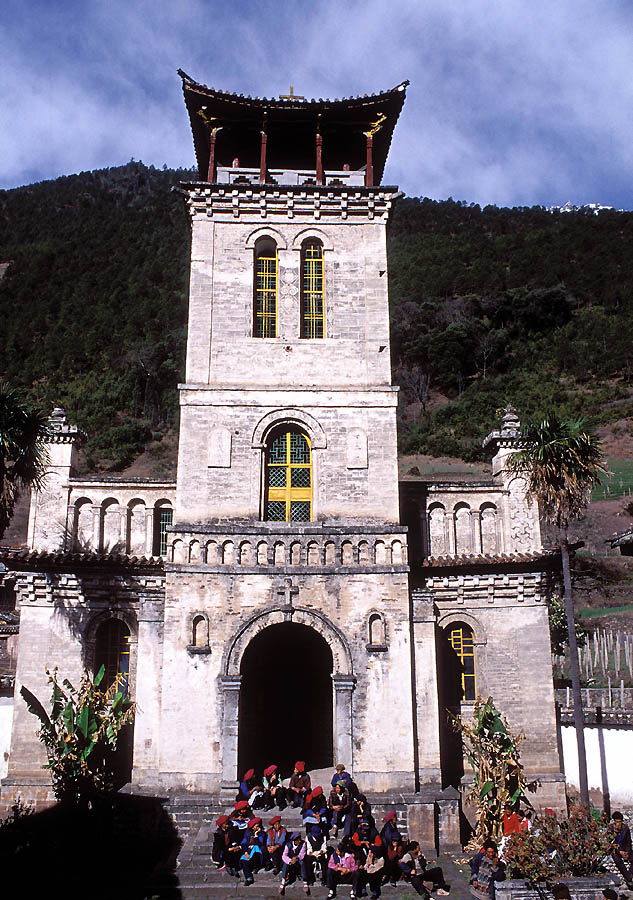
Sacred Heart Church, Cizhong

Monbeig was ordained for the Paris Foreign Missions Society and sent to the Tibetan part of Yunnan in 1899. He assisted Father Jules Dubernard who was murdered in 1905 in Tse-kou with other colleagues. Father Soulié was also killed by a Lama revolt at that time.

Father Monbeig moved afterwards to more secure Cizhong with his parishioners. He built the church of the village (dedicated to Holy Heart) and founded a convent for young Tibetan women to be village teachers. He devoted his free time to collecting plants from the mountains.

In November 1913, the Apostolic Vicar of Tibet in Tatsienlu, Pierre-Philippe Giraudeau, called Monbeig to Batang, Sichuan to revive the Christian community there. He set to work immediately and baptised some new converts. He was murdered near Litang the next year, while reaching a mission post.

More than 20 species were named after him, such as Deutzia monbeigii W.W.Sm. or Cornus monbeigii Hemsl.

== See also ==
- Catholic Church in Sichuan
- Catholic Church in Tibet

== Bibliography ==
- J. H. Barnhart (1965) Biographical Notes Upon Botanists, 2:504
- E. H. M. Cox (1945), Plant Hunting in China : 120
