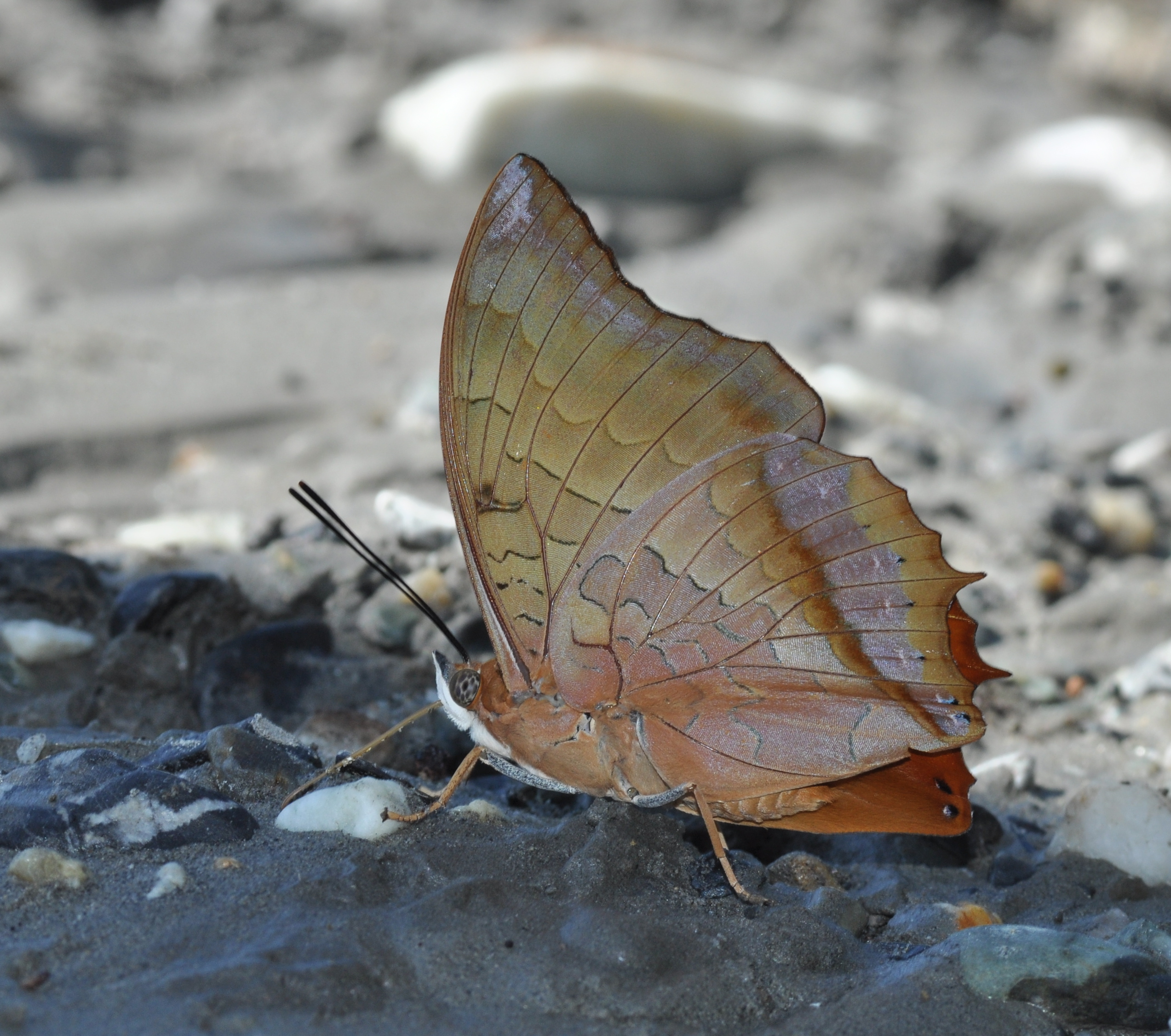
- Ventral View
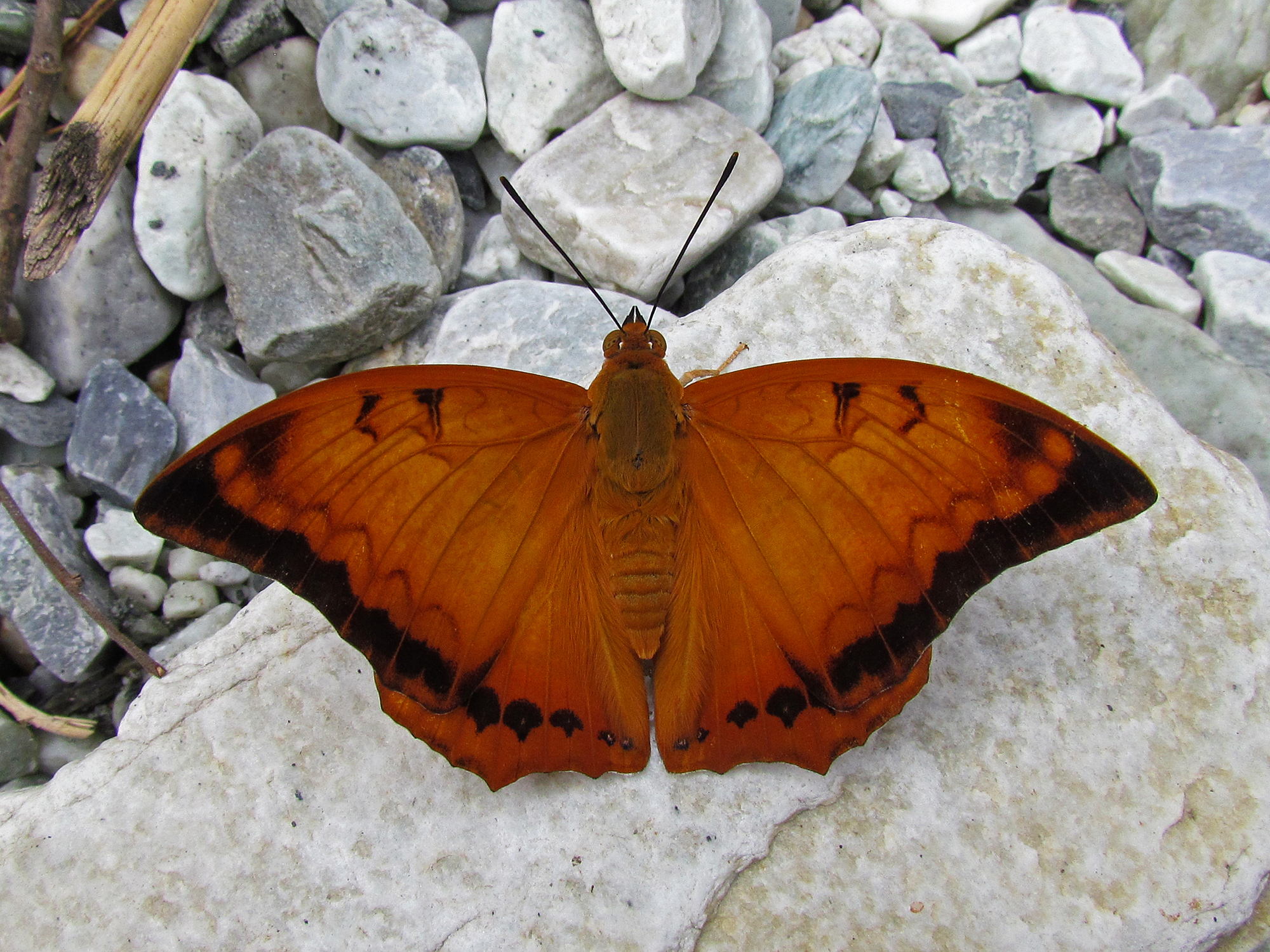
- Dorsal View

Scientific classification
- Kingdom: Animalia
- Phylum: Arthropoda
- Class: Insecta
- Order: Lepidoptera
- Family: Nymphalidae
- Genus: Charaxes
- Species: C. marmax

Binomial name
- Charaxes marmax Westwood, 1848

= Charaxes marmax =

Yellow rajah

Species of butterfly

Charaxes marmax, the yellow rajah, is a butterfly found in India that belongs to the rajahs and nawabs group, that is, the Charaxinae group of the brush-footed butterflies family.

== Description ==
The male has the ground colour of the upperside rich ochraceous tawny. Forewing has a black subcostal spot at the discocellulars and a pale chestnut line on either side of them; a very short slightly curved discal narrow band from vein 7 to vein 5, a postdiscal broad oblique band from costa to vein 6, and a broad terminal band from apex to vein 1, jet-black; the extreme margin of the termen touched interruptedly with fulvous tawny; the postdiscal band continued as a curved lunular narrow chestnut band to vein 1, and the black at apex continued along the costa, joining the postdiscal band above. Hindwing: costal margin broadly pale yellow, terminal third of wing of a darker tawny shade than the base, a short discal broken black line from costa to vein 6; a subterminal slightly curved series of outwardly pointed black spots, increasing in size to interspace 6, the tornal two centred with white; the terminal margin somewhat broadly dark reddish brown. Underside bright ochraceous yellow. Forewings and hindwings crossed by the usual sinuous black lines, the postdiscal line outwardly lunular. Forewing: the discocellulars defined by dark lines, the apex with two short white streaks continued as a line of obscure white dots to interspace 1. Hindwing: the space between base of wing and subbasal dark line and between the median two dark lines darker ochraceous than the ground colour; the postdiscal lunular line with a dark shade beyond, traversed by a series of heavy slate-black lunules, and white, black-tipped obscure dots; the terminal reddish-brown band as on the upperside. Antennae black annulated with white; head, thorax and abdomen tawny; beneath paler, the palpi white.

The female is similar but the ground colour on the disc paler. Forewing: the short discal band very broad, continued as a series of lunules in the interspaces to vein 1: the postdiscal lunular line slender above, not joined onto the black on the termen, and sometimes black, sometimes chestnut-coloured; the black on the margin formed into a subterminal series of large black inwardly conical spots, the termen beyond dusky ochraceous. Hindwing: the subterminal row of black spots with white central transverse very short lines. Underside much as in the male, but the slate-black lunules on the hindwing form a broad obliquely placed line; the subterminal series of white spots larger and more conspicuous both on forewing and hindwing; upper tail spatulate, much longer than in male.

== Distribution ==
Northeastern India (Sikkim, Assam), Bhutan and Burma, Peninsular Malaya and Indochina.

== See also ==
- Charaxinae
- Nymphalidae
- List of butterflies of India
- List of butterflies of India (Nymphalidae)

== Other references ==
- Evans, W.H. (1932). The Identification of Indian Butterflies (2nd ed.). Mumbai, India: Bombay Natural History Society.
