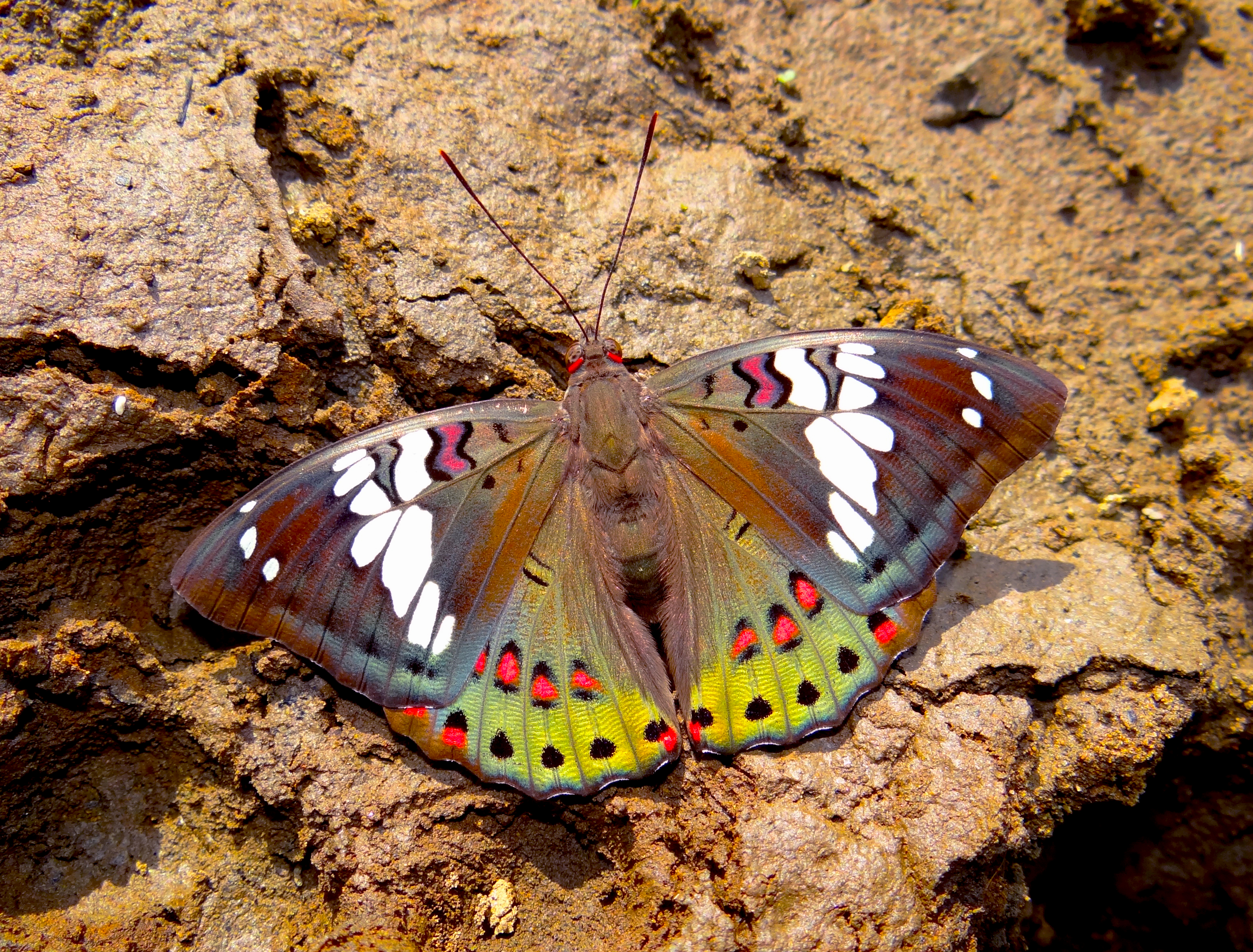

Scientific classification
- Kingdom: Animalia
- Phylum: Arthropoda
- Clade: Pancrustacea
- Class: Insecta
- Order: Lepidoptera
- Family: Nymphalidae
- Genus: Euthalia
- Species: E. lubentina

Binomial name
- Euthalia lubentina (Cramer, 1777)

= Euthalia lubentina =

Gaudy baron

Species of butterfly

Euthalia lubentina, the gaudy baron, is a species of nymphalid butterfly found in Souh Asia, Cambodia, and Southeast Asia. It was first described by Pieter Cramer in 1777.

== Description ==
=== Male ===
The upperside is dark greenish brown. The forewing has a bar across the middle and a bar beyond the apex of the cell, crimson bordered with black. A slightly oblique transverse discal series of small white spots runs from costa to interspace 1, followed by a preapical curved row of four similar spots and a transverse subterminal series of elongate black spots forming an obscure band.

The hindwing has a crescent-shaped black loop near apex of the cell area and a curved postdiscal series of four or five crimson spots outwardly bordered with black. The subcostal spot is the largest, followed by a subterminal series of velvety-black subquadrate spots, the anterior three and the tornal spot are outwardly crimson.

The underside is dark, purplish brown suffused slightly with ochraceous, the markings are as on the upperside, but larger and more clearly defined. The forewing has two small black spots at its base. The basal half of the costal margin is crimson. The hindwing has four crimson spots bordered with black at its base. The costal and dorsal margins are crimson. Another spot is in the postdiscal series.

The antennae are dark brown. The club beneath is crimson. The head, thorax and abdomen are dark greenish brown. Beneath, the palpi and the forelegs are crimson, while the rest are pale brown.

=== Female ===
The female is similar, but paler. On the upperside forewing, the transverse crimson bands in cell are obscure with a broad black-bordered white band interposed. The discal series of white spots are large and irregular in shape. On the hindwing, the ground colour is suffused with greenish blue on the terminal posterior half of wing.

The underside is brown, while the tornal half of the hindwing is bluish green. On the forewing, the markings are as on the upperside, but with two small black spots at the base and an obscure broad terminal pale band. The hindwing has four black-bordered transverse crimson spots at base in addition to the markings are as on the upperside. The antennae, head, thorax and abdomen are as in the male, but paler. The palpi beneath had a stripe of pink, while the forelegs are whitish.

== Distribution ==
They inhabit the lower foot-hills of the Himalayas from Haridwar to Sikkim. They have been recorded at Mussooree, at 10,000 feet (3,000 m); Oudh; Bengal; eastward through Bhutan, Assam, Cachar to Myanmar, Teuasserim, Siam, Malay Peninsula, Sumatra, and on continental India south of Bombay.

== Life history ==
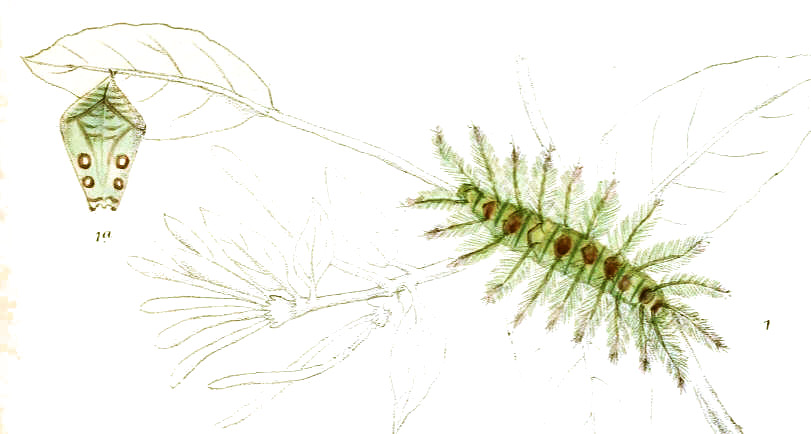
Pupa and caterpillar

=== Egg ===
Its egg is reddish brown.

=== Larva ===
The larva display ten pairs of long, horizontally projected, delicately branched spines. They are grass green with a dorsal row of large purplish-brown angulated spots. They may have a small, pure white diamond spot in its middle. These dorsal spots placed on the anterior half of the 4th, 6th, 7th, 9th, 10th, 11th and 12th segments; the lateral spines are green, tipped with purple brown.

=== Pupa ===
The pupa are green, with two lateral brown marks, each with a dirty-white centre and two brown points equally with whitish centres between these and the terminating projection.

== Gallery ==
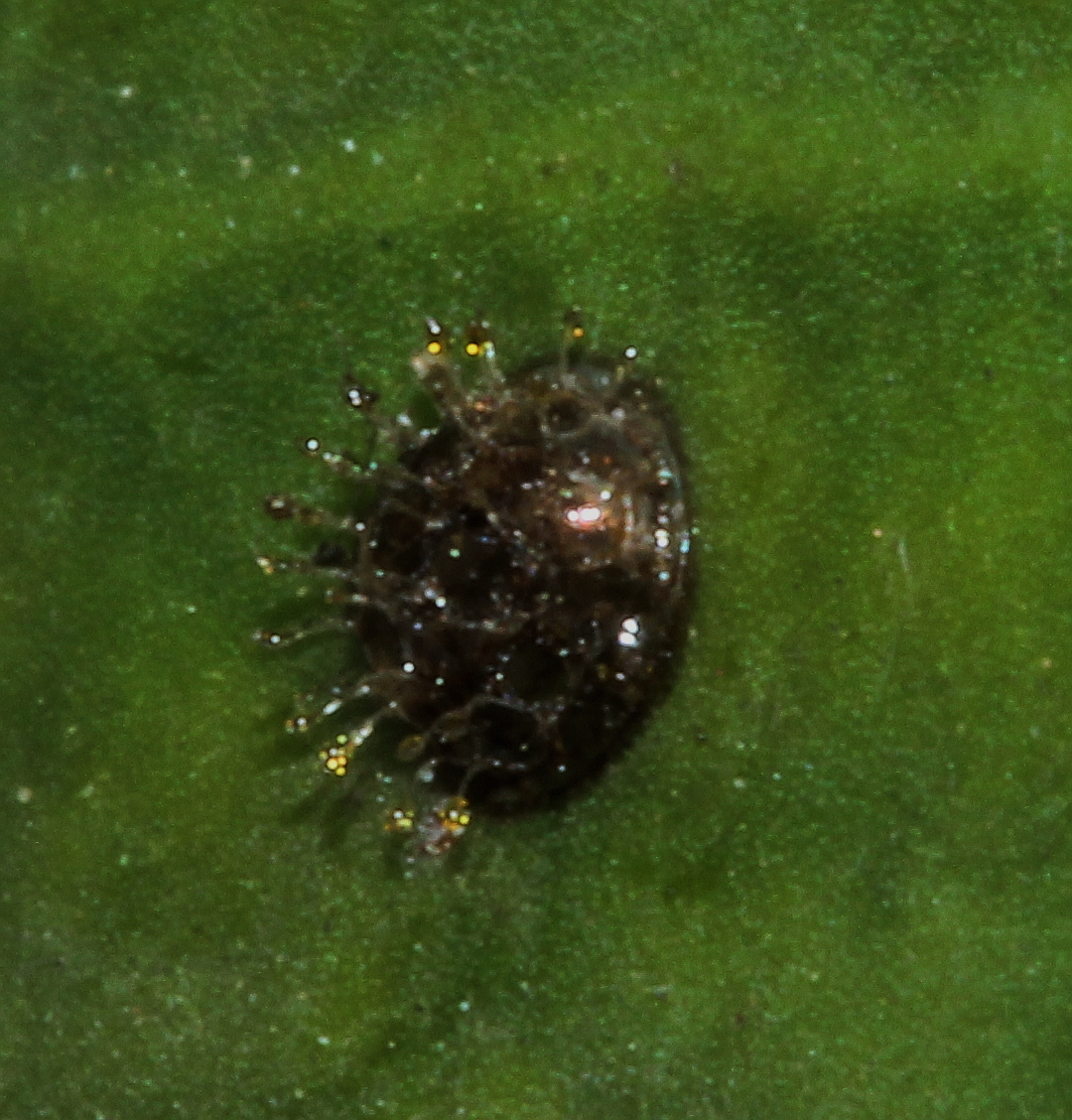
Egg

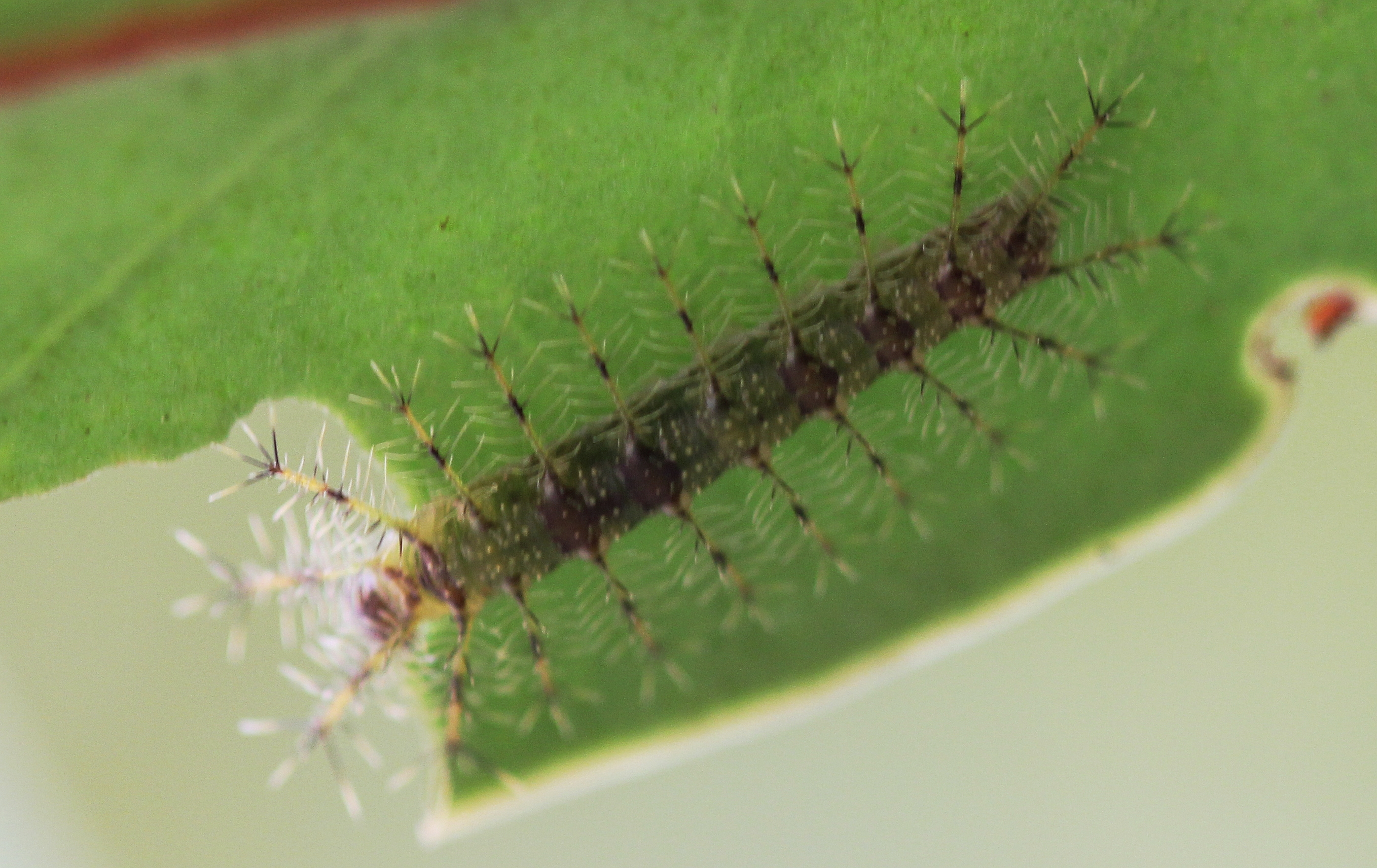
Caterpillar

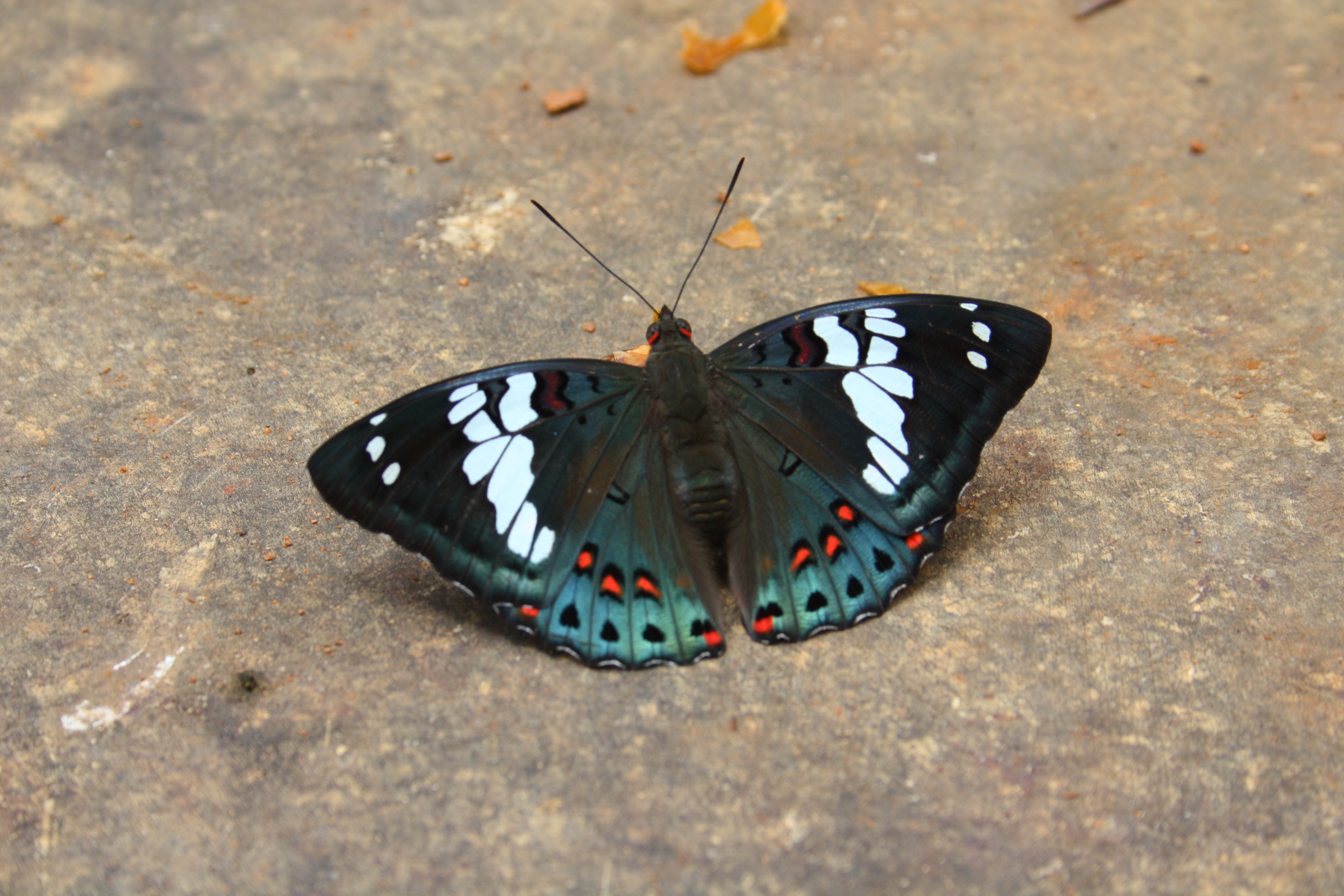

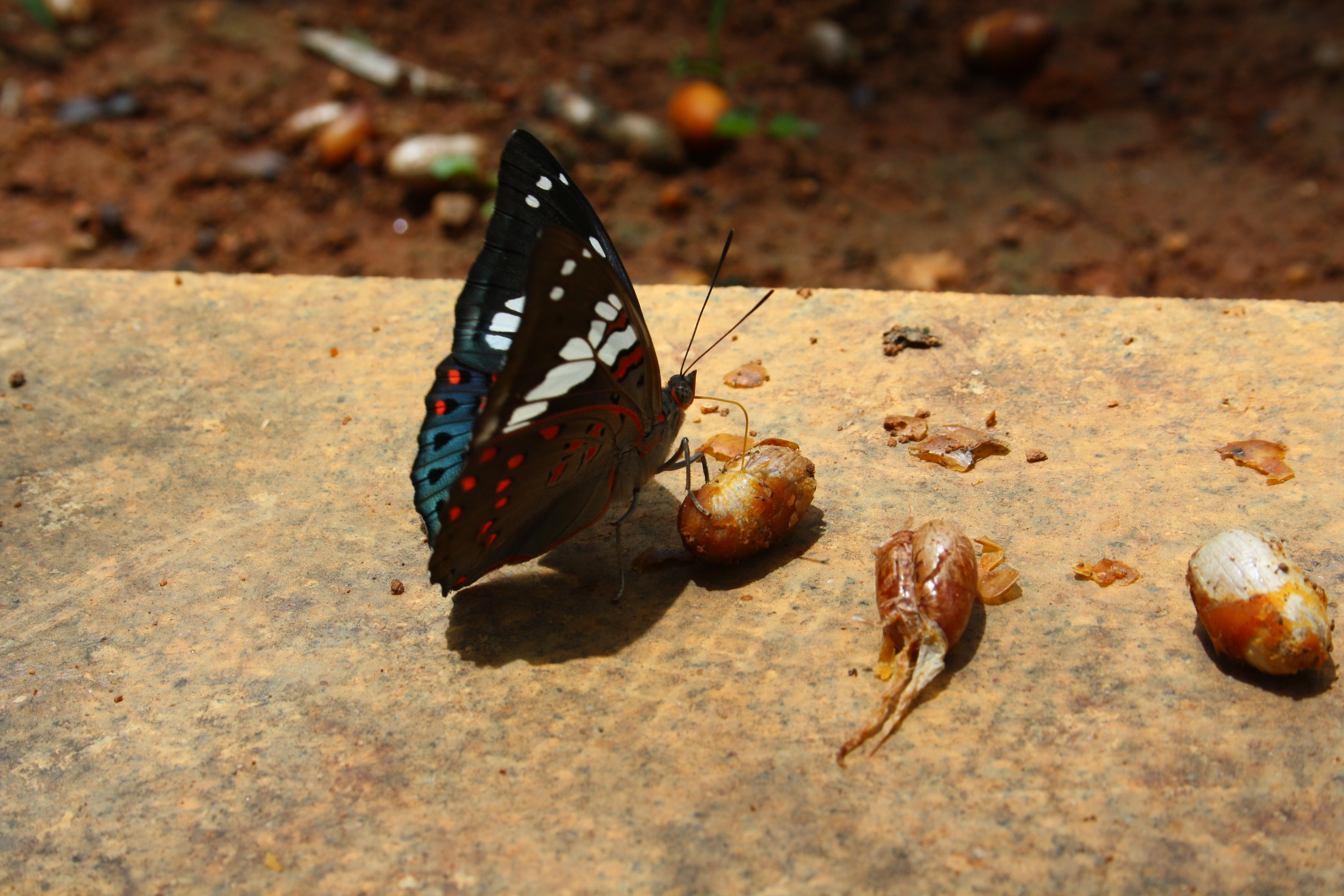

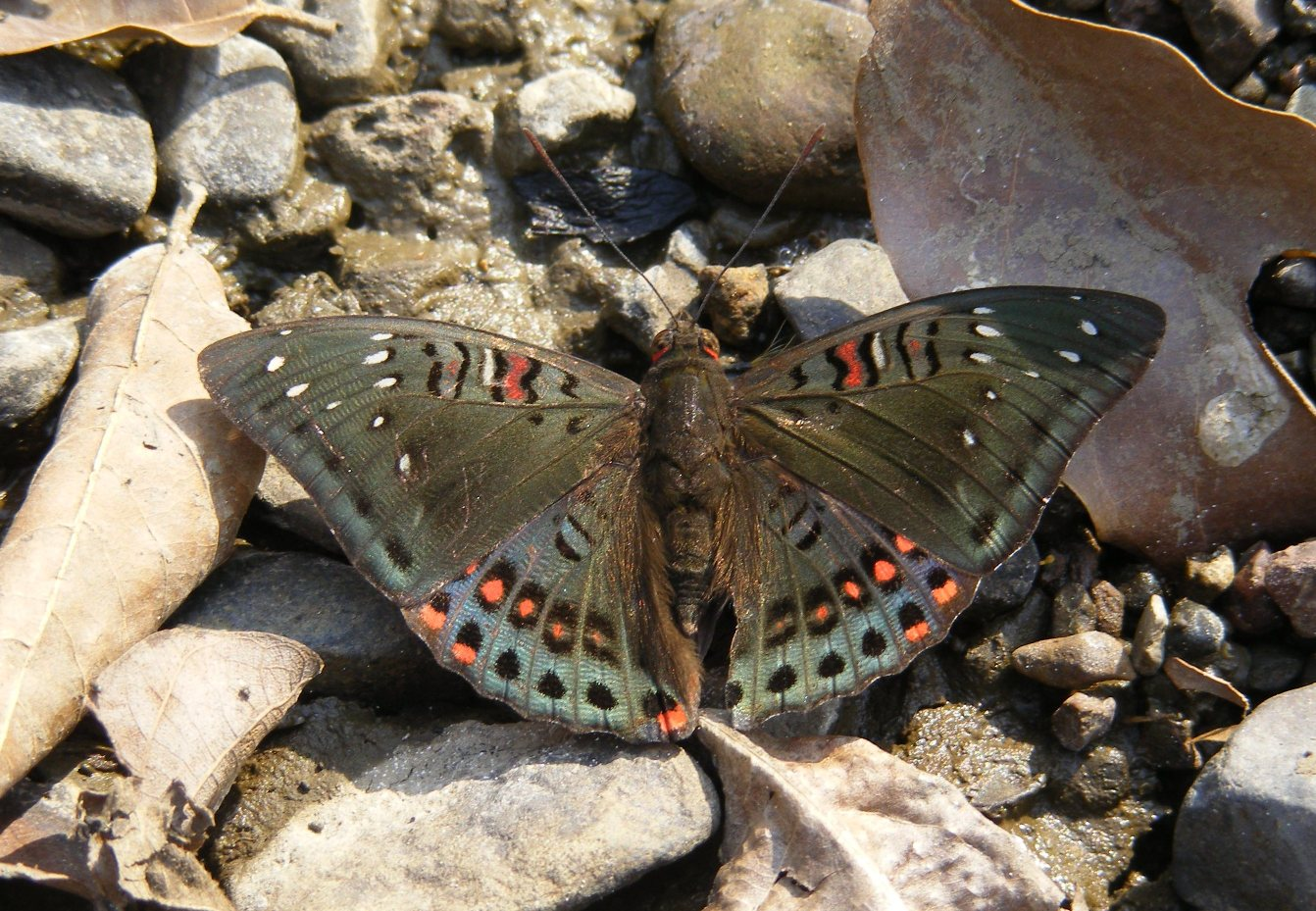

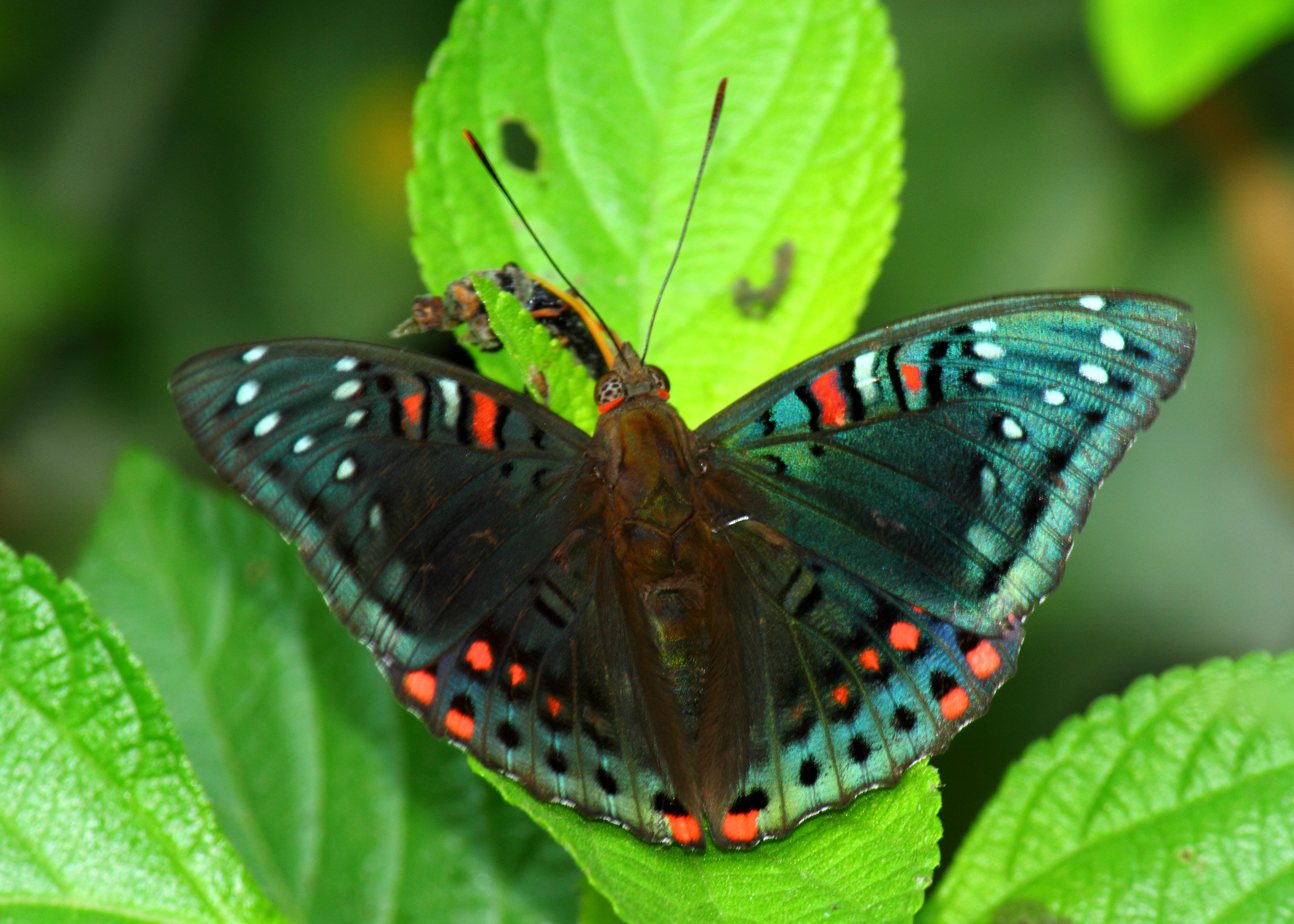
Open wing position of a male found in Chandannagar, West Bengal, India
