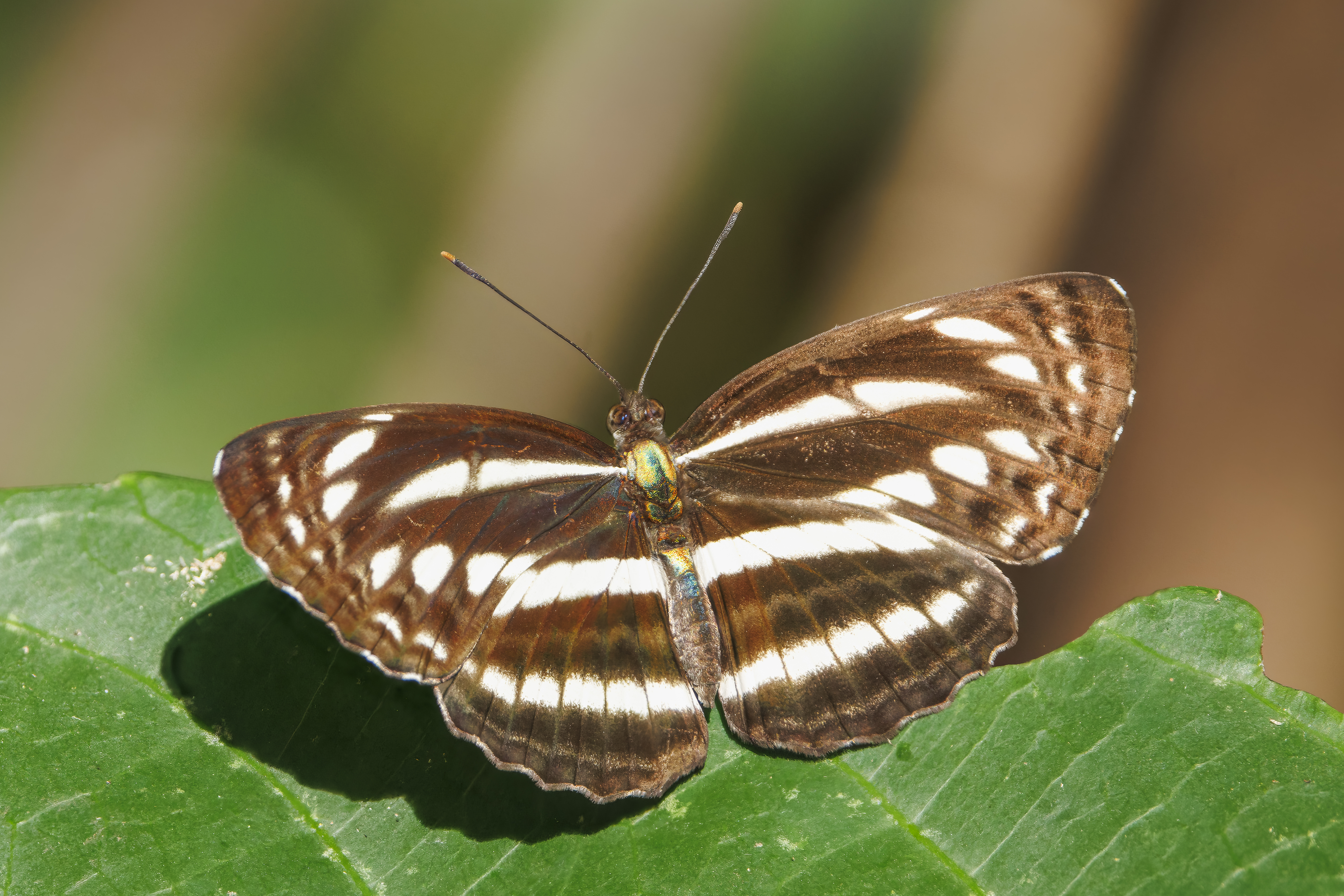
- N.c. susrata, Laos
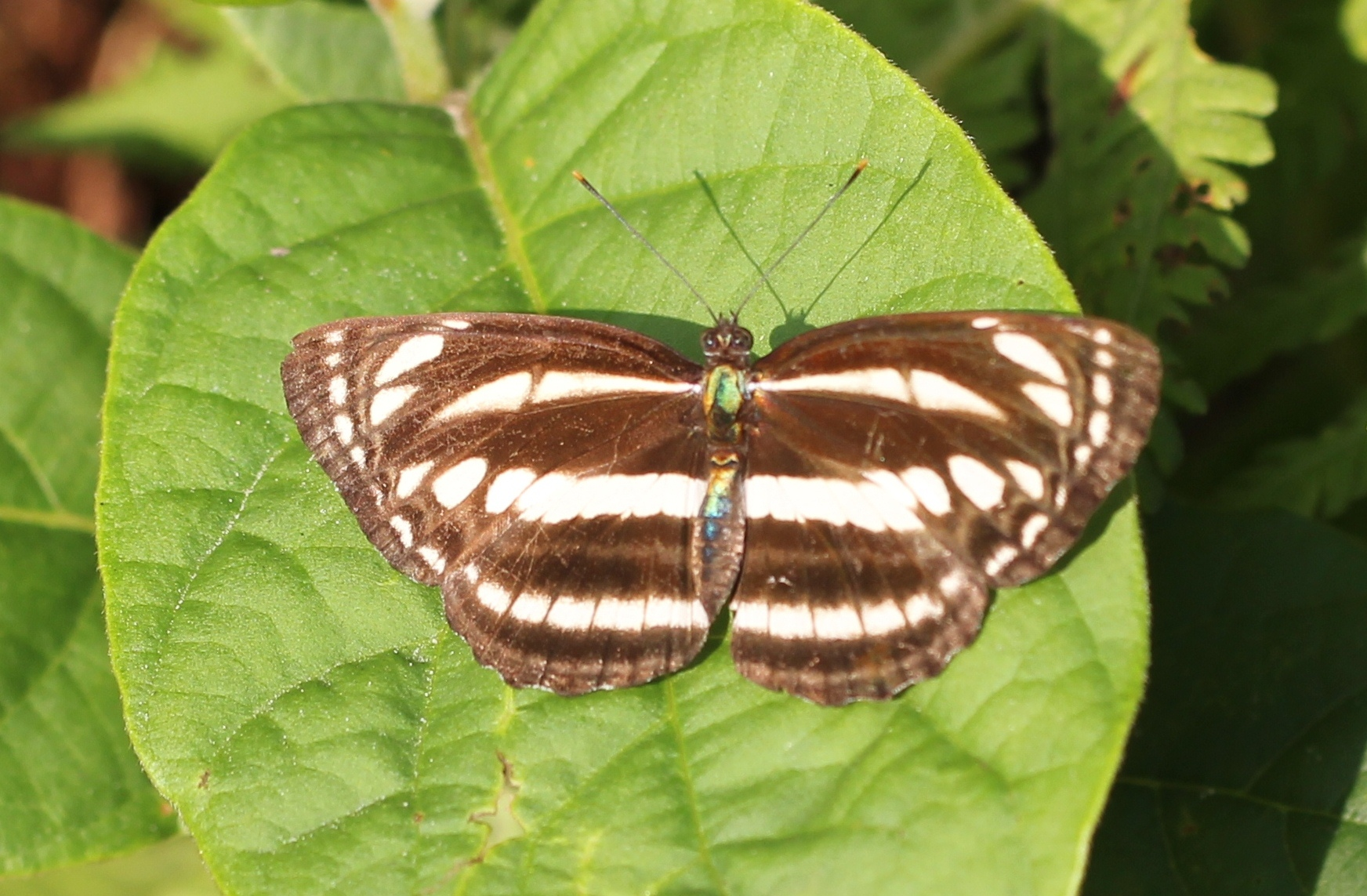

Scientific classification
- Kingdom: Animalia
- Phylum: Arthropoda
- Class: Insecta
- Order: Lepidoptera
- Family: Nymphalidae
- Genus: Neptis
- Species: N. clinia

Binomial name
- Neptis clinia Moore (1872)

= Neptis clinia =

Species of butterfly

Neptis clinia, the southern sullied sailer or clear sailer, is a species of nymphalid butterfly found in South Asia and Southeast Asia.

== Description ==
Male and female. Upper side, ground colour rich ferruginous-red, the basal area slightly tinged with olivescent yellowish-ferruginous. Cilia alternately black and white. Forewing with three black slender bars crossing the cell, and three similar bars below the cell between the basal interspaces of the middle and lower medians; beyond the cell is a large outwardly-oblique pure bluish-white more or less triangulate spot followed by a transverse discal macular band, broadest in the dry-season brood, composed of a series of large broad pure bluish-white spots proceeding from the costa to the posterior margin, of which the upper five are subapical and disposed obliquely outward, the third and fourth being ovate, the upper two very slender and divided by the second subcostal branch, the fifth much the smallest; the next four are disposed somewhat obliquely inward and are much larger, the sixth (or upper) triangularly ovate, the seventh longest and bluntly ovate or somewhat quadrate, the eighth quadrate with its outer edge indented, and the lowest narrow; all these white spots are bordered with black, which colour broadly extends from the cell along the costa and thence decreases hindward; beyond is an outer marginal broad lunularly inner-edged, or occasionally dentate, black waved band, which is traversed by two contiguous slender grey sinuous marginal lines. Hindwing with three black slender bars crossing the cell, and a small spot between the basal interspaces of the veins above the cell; a transverse medial discal broad pure bluish-white macular black-bordered band terminating at the submedian, its inner edge somewhat regular and its outer edge scalloped; followed by an outer discal row of black ill-shaped cordate spots, which are more or less obsolescent posteriorly, or occasionally entirely absent, a similar submarginal row of smaller dentate spots, and then a contiguous narrow waved black marginal band traversed by two slender grey sinuous lines. Underside. Basal area bluish or olive-grey, the outer discal area and the apical veins of forewing bright red; discocellular spot on forewing and transverse discal macular band, as above, bluish-white or greyish-white and black bordered; basal bars black, with the interspace between the middle cell bars and of those below the cell on the forewing bright red; marginal markings as above, except that the marginal sinuous fines are violet-grey, and the inner line broadly encompassing the submarginal black spots on the hindwing. Body above red; palpi above black, beneath greenish-white; body beneath and legs bluish-grey; antennae black, tip reddish beneath; eyes bronzy-brown.

— Frederic Moore, Lepidoptera Indica. Vol. III

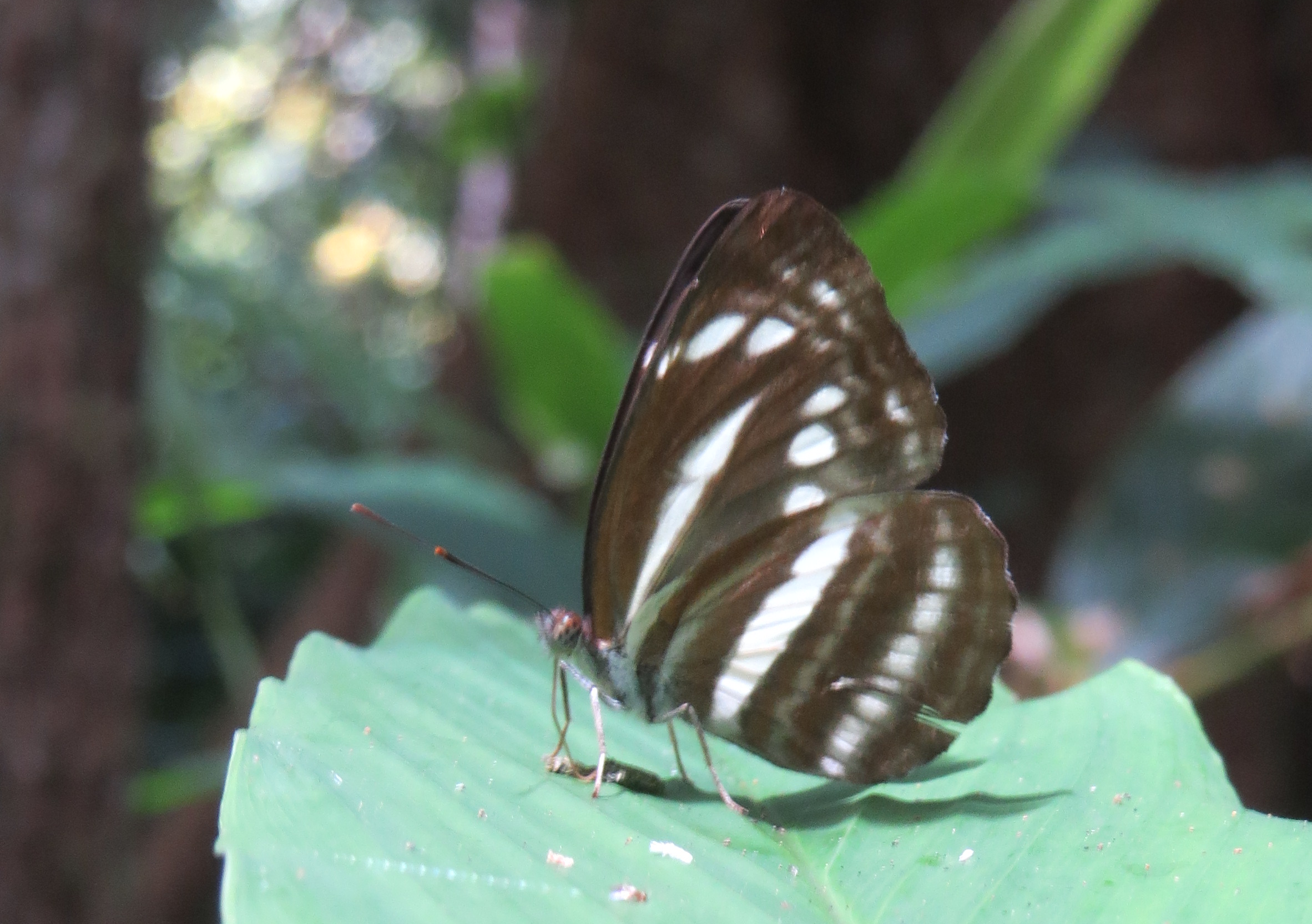
From Parambikulam Wildlife Sanctuary in Kerala, India

- Images BOLD

== Subspecies ==
- N. c. clinia Andaman Islands
- N. c. susruta Moore, 1872 E.India - S.China, Thailand, Indo-China
- N. c. leuconata Butler, 1879 Thailand, West Malaysia
- N. c. kallaura Moore, 1881 S.India
- N. c. tibetana Moore, 1899 W.China
- N. c. parthica Fruhstorfer, 1908 Philippines (Palawan)
- N. c. apharea Fruhstorfer, 1908 Sumatra, Borneo
- N. c. smedleyi Eliot, 1969 Mentawai Island
- N. c. phrasylas Eliot, 1969 Java
- N. c. praedicta Smetacek, 2011 W.Himalaya

== See also ==
- List of butterflies of India
- List of butterflies of India (Nymphalidae)
