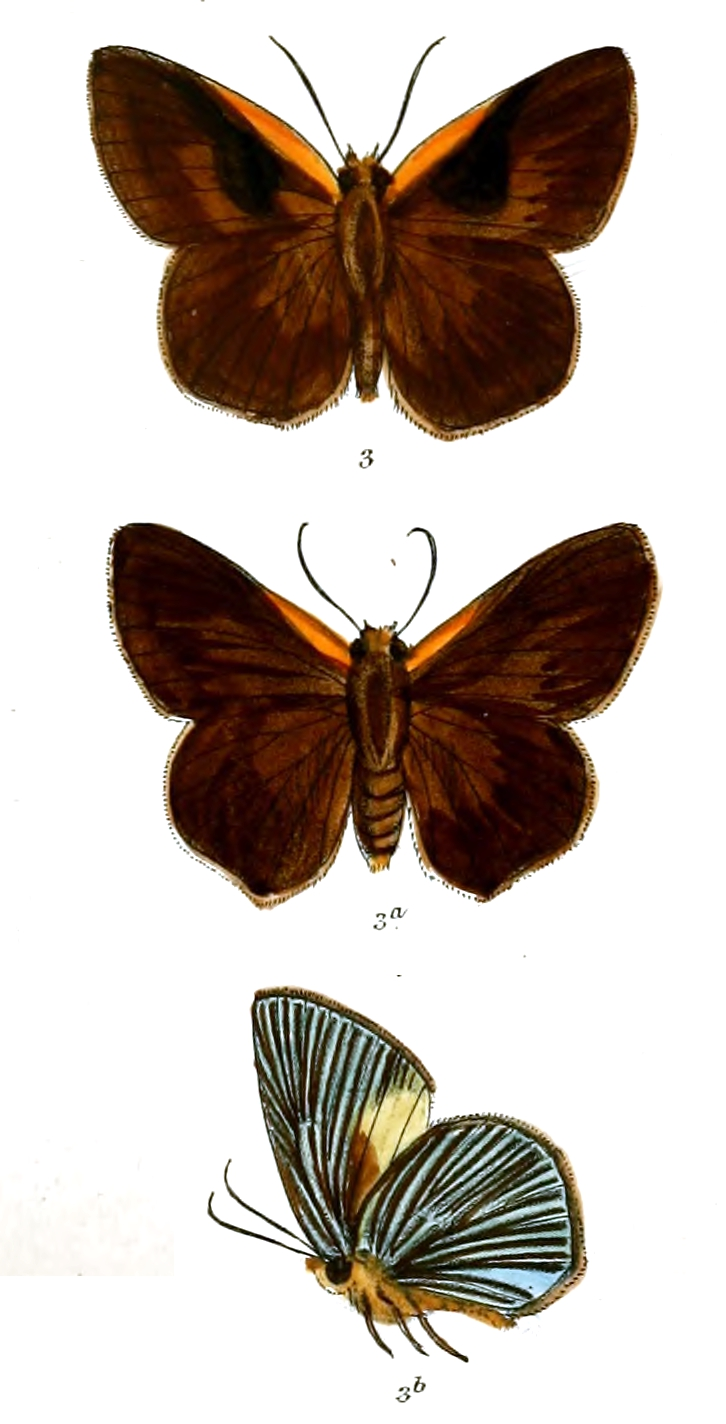
- Male (above), female (middle), male underside (lower)

Scientific classification
- Kingdom: Animalia
- Phylum: Arthropoda
- Clade: Pancrustacea
- Class: Insecta
- Order: Lepidoptera
- Family: Hesperiidae
- Genus: Burara
- Species: B. amara

Binomial name
- Burara amara (Moore, 1866)

Synonyms
- Ismene amara Moore 1866; Pola amara (Moore 1866); Bibasis amara (Moore 1866)

= Burara amara =

Small green awlet

Species of butterfly

Burara amara, the small green awlet, is a species of hesperid butterfly found in Northeast India and Southeast Asia. The butterfly has been reassigned to the genus Burara by Vane-Wright and de Jong (2003) and is now Burara amara.

== Range ==
The small green awlet ranges from India, (Sikkim eastwards through Assam), to Myanmar, Thailand, Laos, Hainan and south Yunnan. It is also found in the Andaman Islands.

The type locality is northeast Bengal.

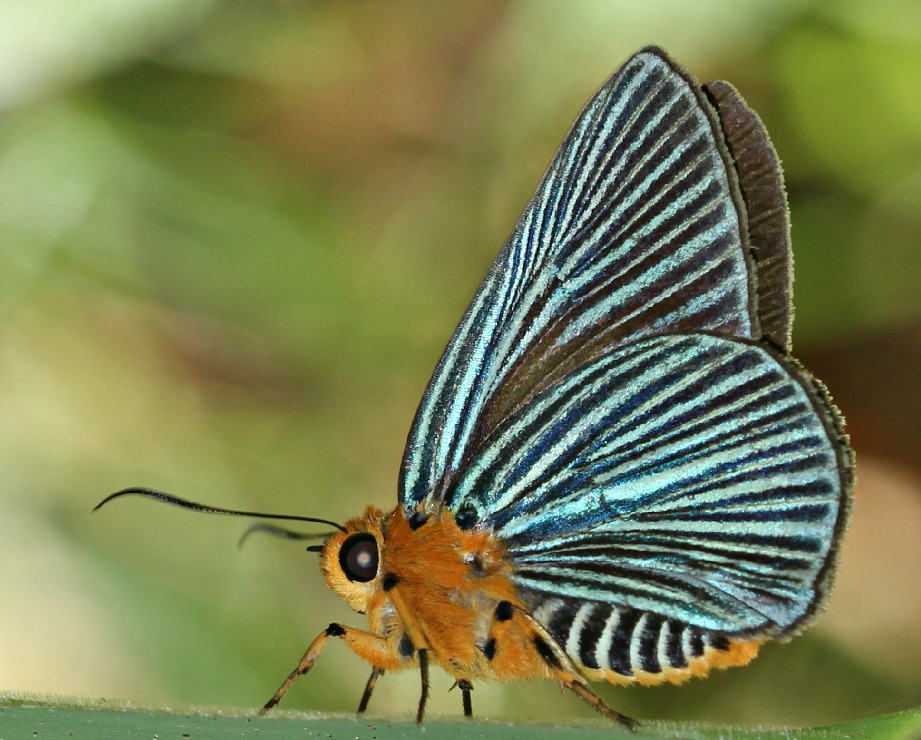
At Mount Harriet National Park in the Andamans

== Status ==
It is rare in the Himalayas and very rare in the Andamans.

== Description ==
The butterfly has a wingspan of 45 to 55 mm.

Edward Yerbury Watson (1891) gives a detailed description:

Male and female. Upperside brown with a greenish gloss; costal streak of forewing ochreous yellow in the male, less prominent in the female; male with a blackish subbasal patch. Cilia of both wings short and brownish white. Body dark brown; abdomen with greyish segmental bands. Underside, forewing brown, becoming bluish black along the base of the costa; posterior margin broadly brownish white; hindwing bluish black; veins of both wings brownish white, the space between them having a greyish blue parallel line running their entire length. Both wings also with the black ochreous-yellow-encirled basal spot. Thorax in front and beneath, head, palpi, legs, middle of abdomen, and anal tuft ochreous yellow. Femora and tibiae with a black spot; sides of abdomen black, the segmental bands prominent, Cilia greyish.

== Habits ==
It is crepuscular.
