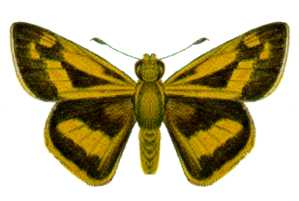

Scientific classification
- Kingdom: Animalia
- Phylum: Arthropoda
- Class: Insecta
- Order: Lepidoptera
- Family: Hesperiidae
- Genus: Telicota
- Species: T. ancilla

Binomial name
- Telicota ancilla (Herrich-Schäffer, 1869)

Synonyms
- Pamphila ancilla Herrich-Schäffer, 1869; Pamphila olivescens Herrich-Schäffer, 1869

= Telicota ancilla =

Dark palm dart

Species of butterfly

Telicota ancilla, the dark palm dart, is a butterfly belonging to the family Hesperiidae. Telicota species form a complex and exact species identity can only be determined by examination of the genitalia.

The larvae feed on various grasses, such as Imperata cylindrica, Paspalum urvillei and Sorghum halepense. Other hosts recorded include Ochlandra travancorica, Bambusa striata and Bambusa wamin.

== Subspecies ==
- Telicota ancilla ancilla (Herrich-Schäffer, 1869) – greenish darter (New South Wales and Queensland)
- Telicota ancilla baudina Evans, 1949 (Northern Territory and Western Australia)
- Telicota ancilla horisha Evans, 1934 (southern China, northern Vietnam, Taiwan)
- Telicota ancilla lanka (Sri Lanka)
- Telicota ancilla mamba (Mambare River)
- Telicota ancilla minda Evans, 1934 (Philippines)
- Telicota ancilla santa Evans, 1934 (Philippines)
- Telicota ancilla volens (Timor)
