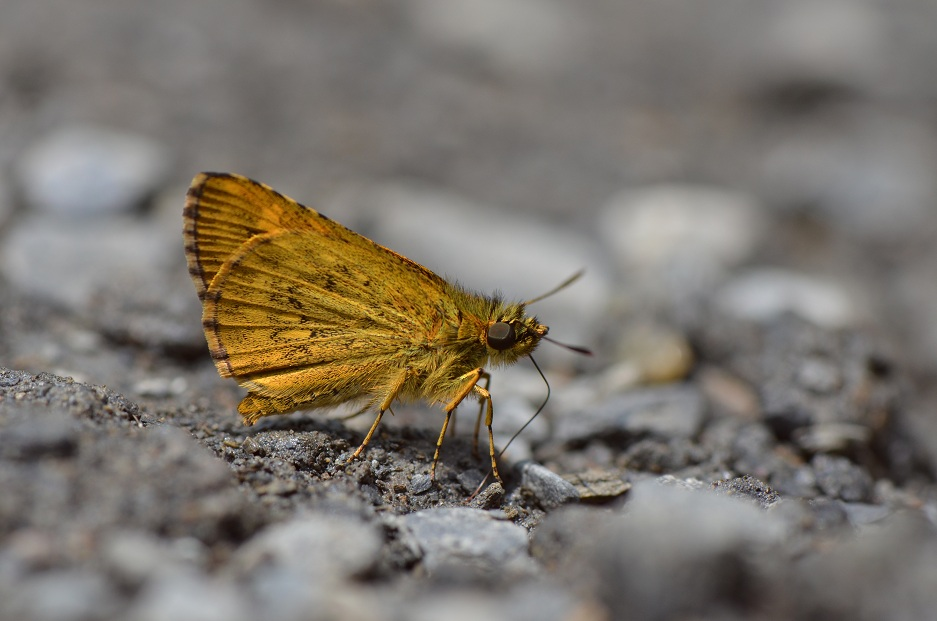

Scientific classification
- Domain: Eukaryota
- Kingdom: Animalia
- Phylum: Arthropoda
- Class: Insecta
- Order: Lepidoptera
- Family: Hesperiidae
- Genus: Ampittia
- Species: A. virgata

Binomial name
- Ampittia virgata (Leech, 1890)

Synonyms
- Pamphila virgata Leech, 1890

= Ampittia virgata =

Species of butterfly

Ampittia virgata is a species of butterfly in the family Hesperiidae. It was described by John Henry Leech in 1890. It is found in China and Taiwan. Its wingspan is 30–32 mm. Cell of forewing beneath yellow with a black streak in the centre.

== Subspecies ==
- Ampittia virgata virgata (Leech, 1890) (China)
- Ampittia virgata miyakei Matsumura, 1910 (Taiwan)
