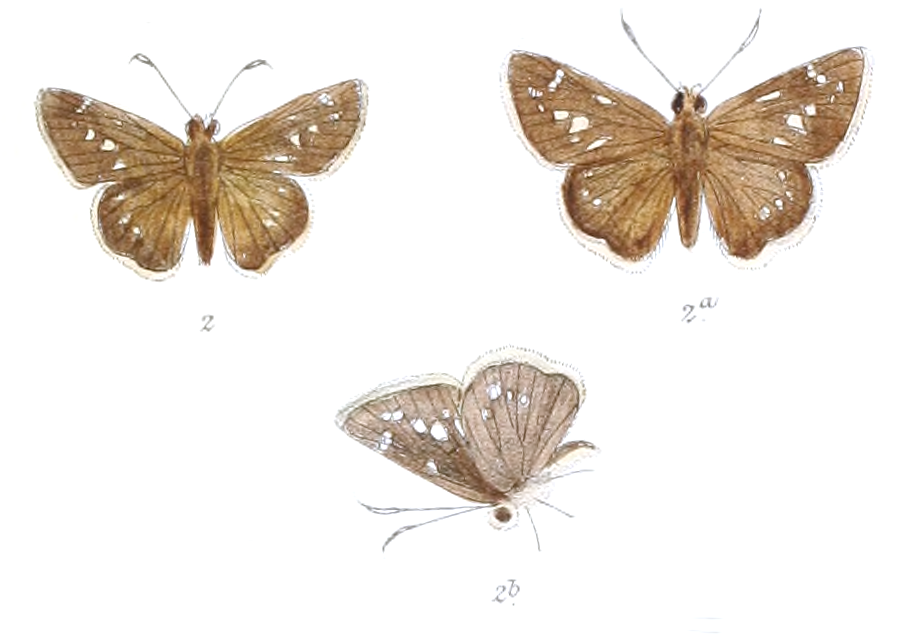

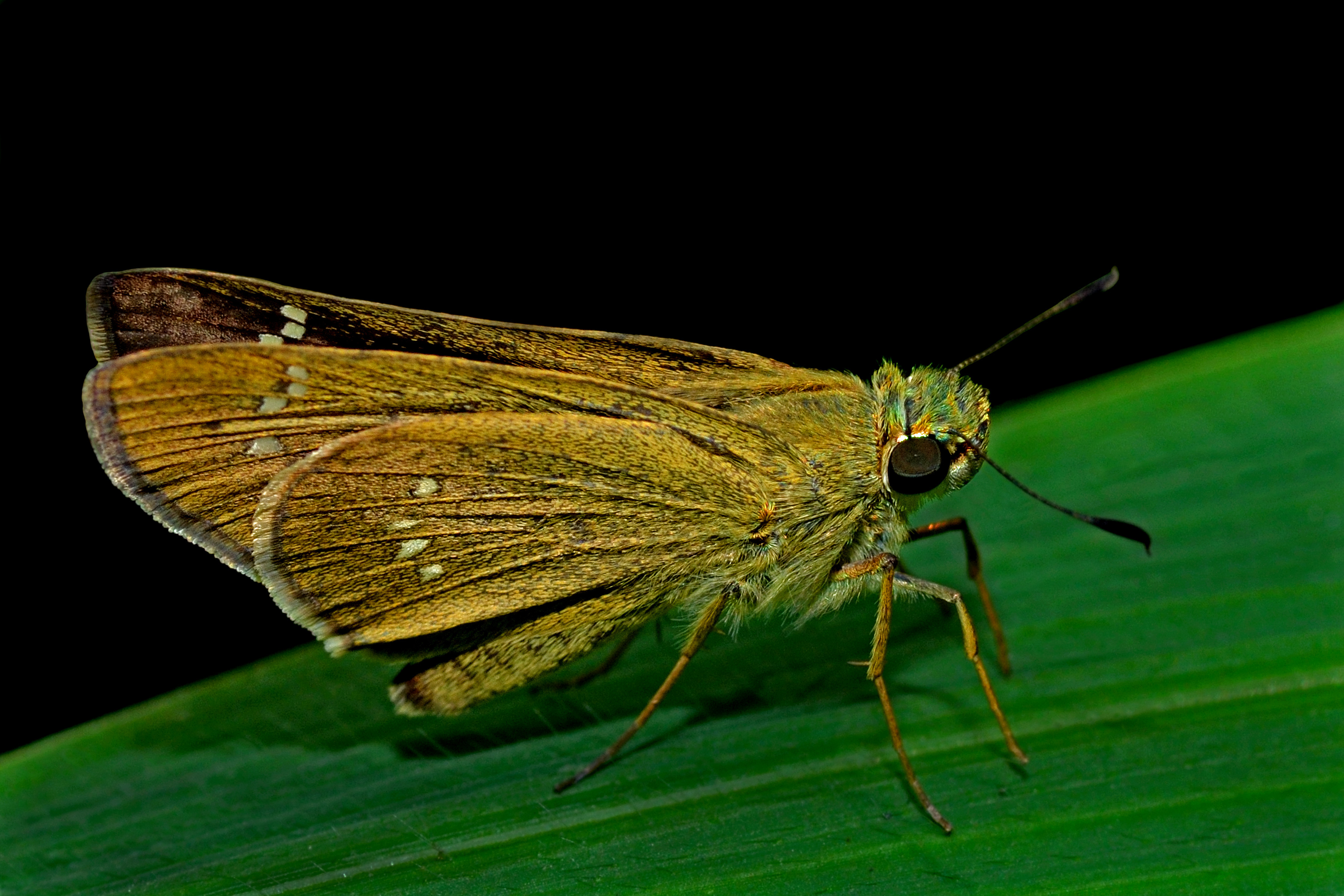

Scientific classification
- Kingdom: Animalia
- Phylum: Arthropoda
- Clade: Pancrustacea
- Class: Insecta
- Order: Lepidoptera
- Family: Hesperiidae
- Genus: Borbo
- Species: B. bevani

Binomial name
- Borbo bevani (Moore, 1878)

Synonyms
- Hesperia bevani Moore, 1878; Pseudoborbo bevani (Moore, 1878)

= Borbo bevani =

Beavan's swift

Species of butterfly

Borbo bevani, the Beavan's swift, is a butterfly belonging to the family Hesperiidae. It is named after Captain Robert Cecil Beavan. It is found throughout India.

== Description ==
Male. Upperside dark olive-brown; cilia pale brownish-cinereous; forewing with a single small, pale white, semi-diaphanous spot at upper end of the cell, three contiguous subapical spots, another below these; and two larger spots below obliquely on the disc, a small spot also very indistinctly visible on middle of submedian vein; hindwing without spots. Underside greyish olive-brown; spots slightly more prominent than above; hindwing with a discal series of five small somewhat indistinct white spots.

Salween, Moulmein (Lt. Bevan). A male specimen of this species from Calcutta collected by the late Mr. Atkinson is in the collection of Dr. O. Staudinger. Also recorded from Karachi, Mhow, Poona and Bombay (Swinhoe); Calcutta (de Niceville); Orissa (Taylor); Nilgiris (Hampson). Mr. Elwes also states that he has specimens from Mandi, N.-W. Himalayas, Khasias, and Sikkim.

— Edward Yerbury Watson
