= Baoris unicolor =

Baoris unicolor may refer to two different species of grass skippers:

- Baoris unicolor Moore, [1884], a valid species in the tribe Baorini
- Baoris unicolor Distant, 1886, a homonym subsequently renamed to Idmon distanti in the tribe Ismini
