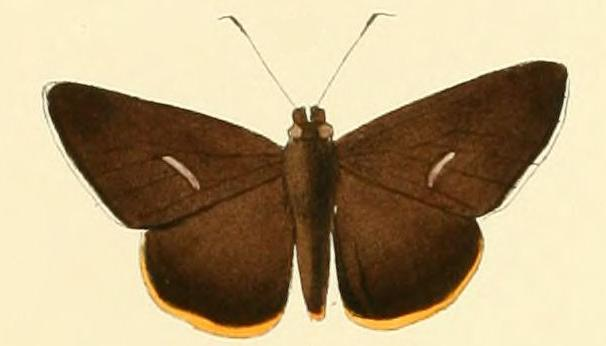

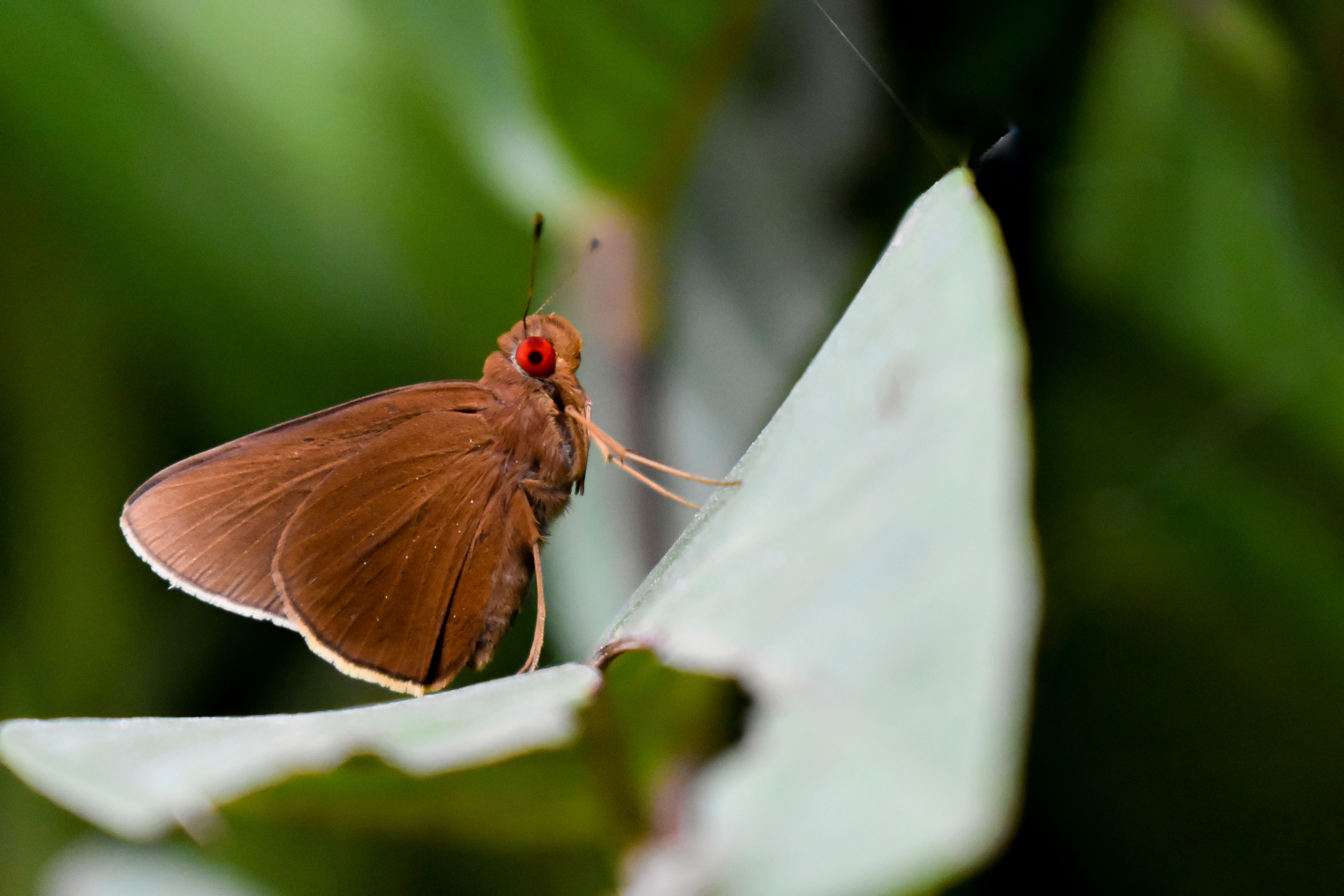

Scientific classification
- Kingdom: Animalia
- Phylum: Arthropoda
- Class: Insecta
- Order: Lepidoptera
- Family: Hesperiidae
- Genus: Matapa
- Species: M. druna

Binomial name
- Matapa druna (Moore, [1866])

Synonyms
- Ismene druna Moore, [1866]; Hesperia pulla Plötz, 1882; Matapa shalgrama de Nicéville, [1884]

= Matapa druna =

Species of butterfly

Matapa druna, the grey-brand redeye, is a butterfly in the family Hesperiidae. It is found from Sikkim to northern Vietnam, China, Borneo and Bali.

The length of the forewings is 19.4-23.4 mm for males and 21.4–26 mm for females.Separated from Matapa aria by the bright yellow fringes of the hindwings, but otherwise very closely allied to aria.

The larvae feed on Bambusa species.
