= Reed frog =

Reed frog may refer to:

- Hyperolius, or African reed frog, a genus endemic to Sub-Saharan Africa
- Heterixalus, or Madagascan reed frog, a genus endemic to Madagascar
- Raorchestes ochlandrae, or Ochlandrae reed frog, a frog endemic to the Western Ghats, India
