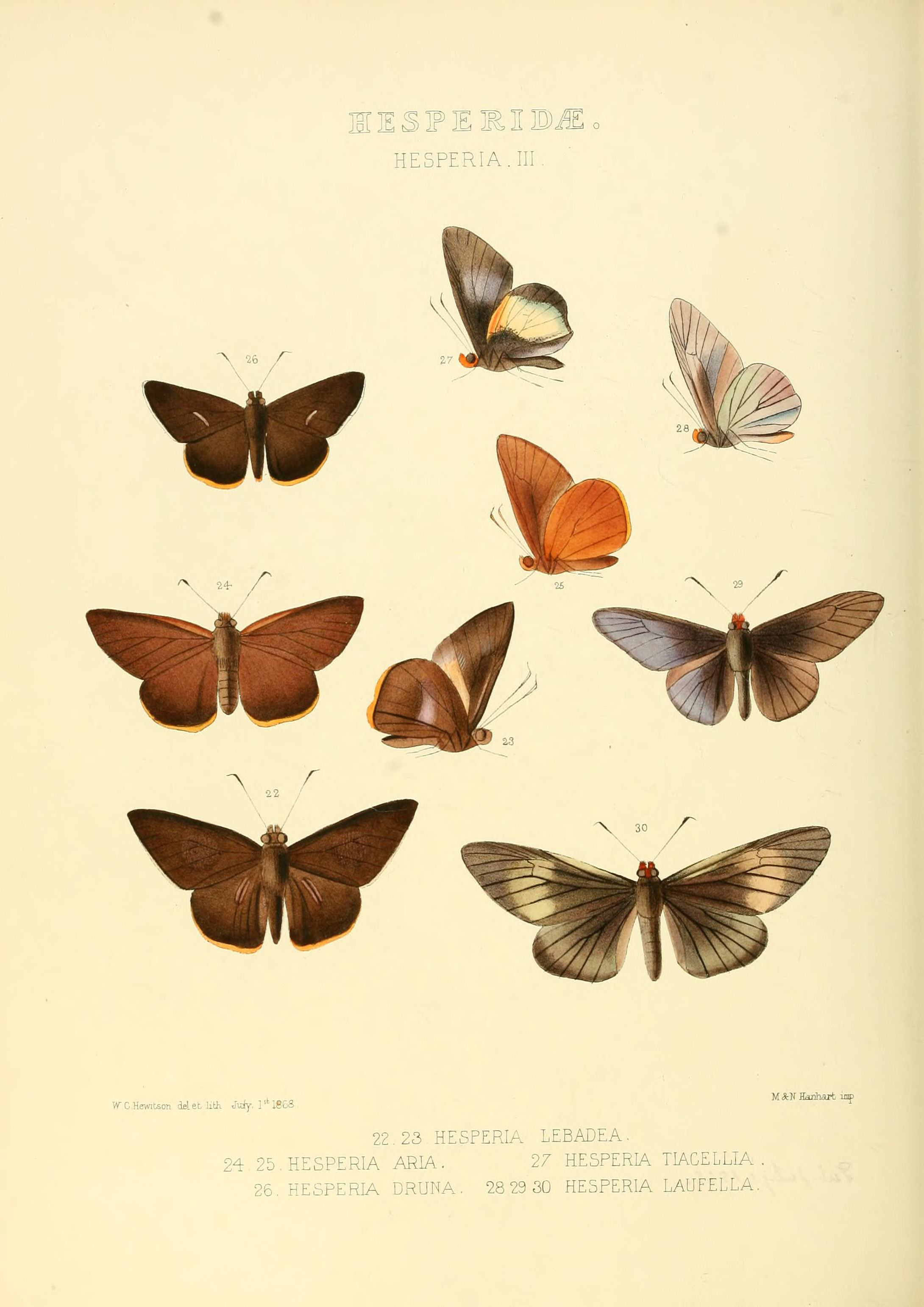
- Matapa aria female (fig. 24 & 25); M. druna (fig. 26)

Scientific classification
- Kingdom: Animalia
- Phylum: Arthropoda
- Class: Insecta
- Order: Lepidoptera
- Family: Hesperiidae
- Tribe: Erionotini
- Genus: Matapa; Moore, [1881]

Species
- See text

= Matapa (butterfly) =

Genus of butterflies

Matapa is a genus of grass skipper butterflies in the family Hesperiidae. The species of this genus occur in the Indomalayan realm, from India to Sulawesi. They are mainly crepuscular and have red eyes.

== Species ==
- Matapa aria (Moore, [1866])
- Matapa celsina (C. & R. Felder, [1867]) – Celebes, Banggai Island
- Matapa cresta Evans, 1949 – Sikkim to Burma, China, Andamans, Thailand, Laos, Malaya, Borneo, Sumatra
- Matapa deprivata de Jong, 1983 – Burma
- Matapa druna (Moore, [1866])
- Matapa intermedia de Jong, 1983 – Sulawesi
- Matapa pseudodruna X.L. Fan, H. Chiba & M. Wang – China
- Matapa purpurascens Elwes & Edwards, 1897 – Khasi Hills (Assam), China
- Matapa sasivarna (Moore, [1866]) – Sikkim to Burma, Thailand, Laos, Hainan, Malaya, Sumatra

== Ecology ==
The larvae feed on grasses including Bambusa, Dendrocalamus, Dinochloa, Gigantochloa, Ochlandra, and Oxytenanthera.
