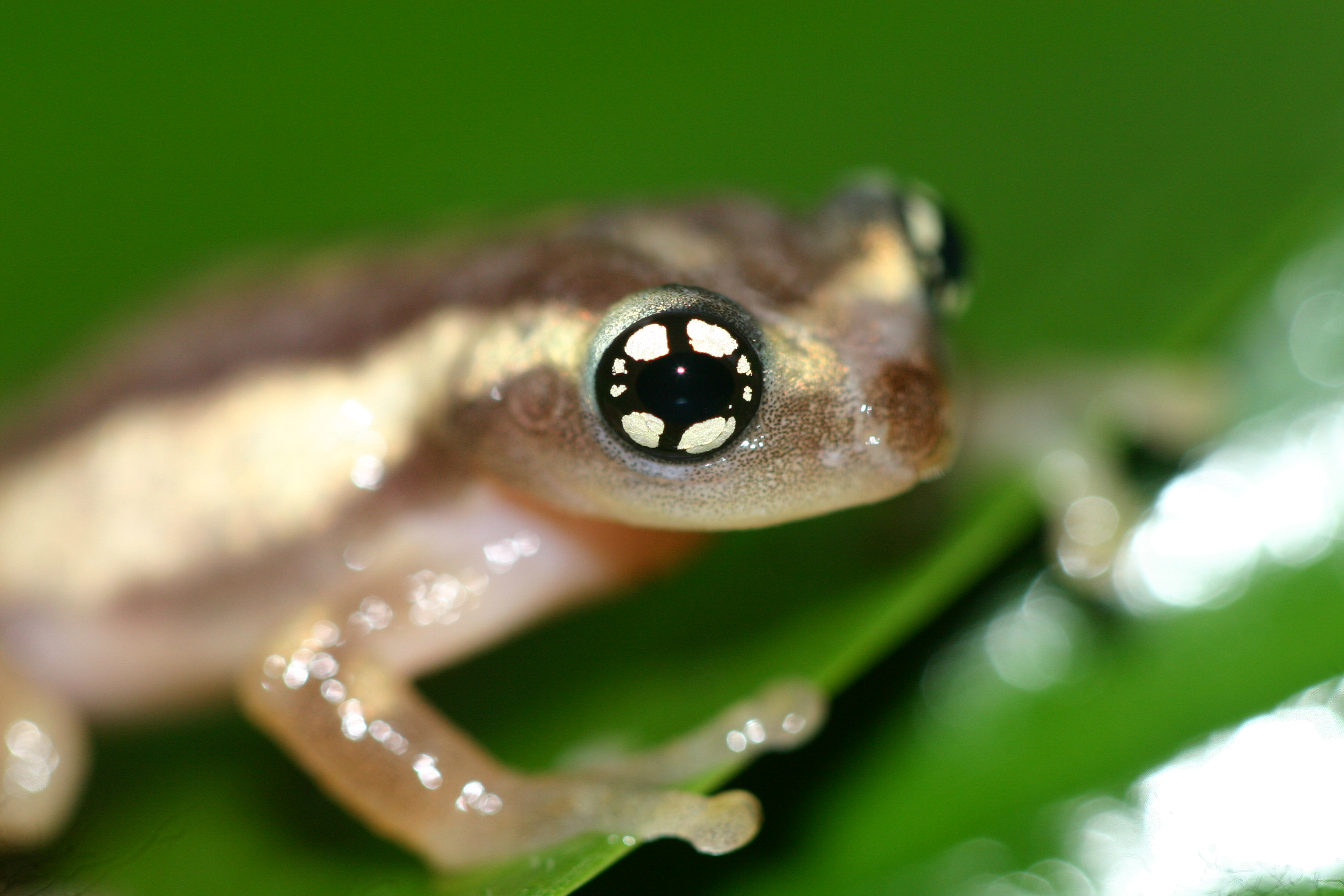

Conservation status
- Least Concern (IUCN 3.1)

Scientific classification
- Kingdom: Animalia
- Phylum: Chordata
- Class: Amphibia
- Order: Anura
- Family: Rhacophoridae
- Genus: Raorchestes
- Species: R. ochlandrae

Binomial name
- Raorchestes ochlandrae (Gururaja, Dinesh, Palot, Radhakrishnan, and Ramachandra, 2007)

Synonyms
- Philautus ochlandrae Gururaja, Dinesh, Palot, Radhakrishnan, and Ramachandra, 2007

= Raorchestes ochlandrae =

Species of amphibian

Raorchestes ochlandrae (common name: Ochlandrae reed frog) is a species of shrub frog in the family Rhacophoridae. It is endemic to the Western Ghats, India. This species of the oriental shrub frog was first described from Kakkayam Reserve Forest of Calicut district, Kerala state, in the southern Western Ghats in 2007 but has since been recorded at many other sites along the Western Ghats. The specific name ochlandrae refers to microhabitat of the species, bamboo Ochlandra setigera.

== Description ==
Males measure 22–26 mm (0.87–1.02 in) and females, based on only one measured specimen, 23 mm (0.91 in) in snout–vent length. The female was observed in amplexus and was larger than the male it was paired with.

This species is distinguished from congeners by the combination of characters such as body small, elongate, squat and flat; head arched, wider than long; snout short rounded, equal or sub equal to diameter of eye; canthus rostralis rounded; tympanum indistinct but visible; eyes protruding, pupil with striking golden yellow dentition like marks; belly granular; vocal sac unpigmented; fleshy brown to cream yellow dorsum with two distinct golden yellow lateral bands bordered by dark brown from upper eyelid to the posterior part of flanks.

== Distribution ==
The species is endemic to the Western Ghats mountains, reported from parts of the Nilgiris and Anaimalai Hills. It is reported from evergreen forests with bamboos around 600 to 1000 metres above mean sea level.

== Taxonomy ==
Genetic studies indicate that the Ochlandra reed frog is part of an evolutionary clade comprising five lineages including R. ochlandrae, R. chalazodes, R. manohari, R. uthamani, and a lineage described as Raorchestes flaviocularis.

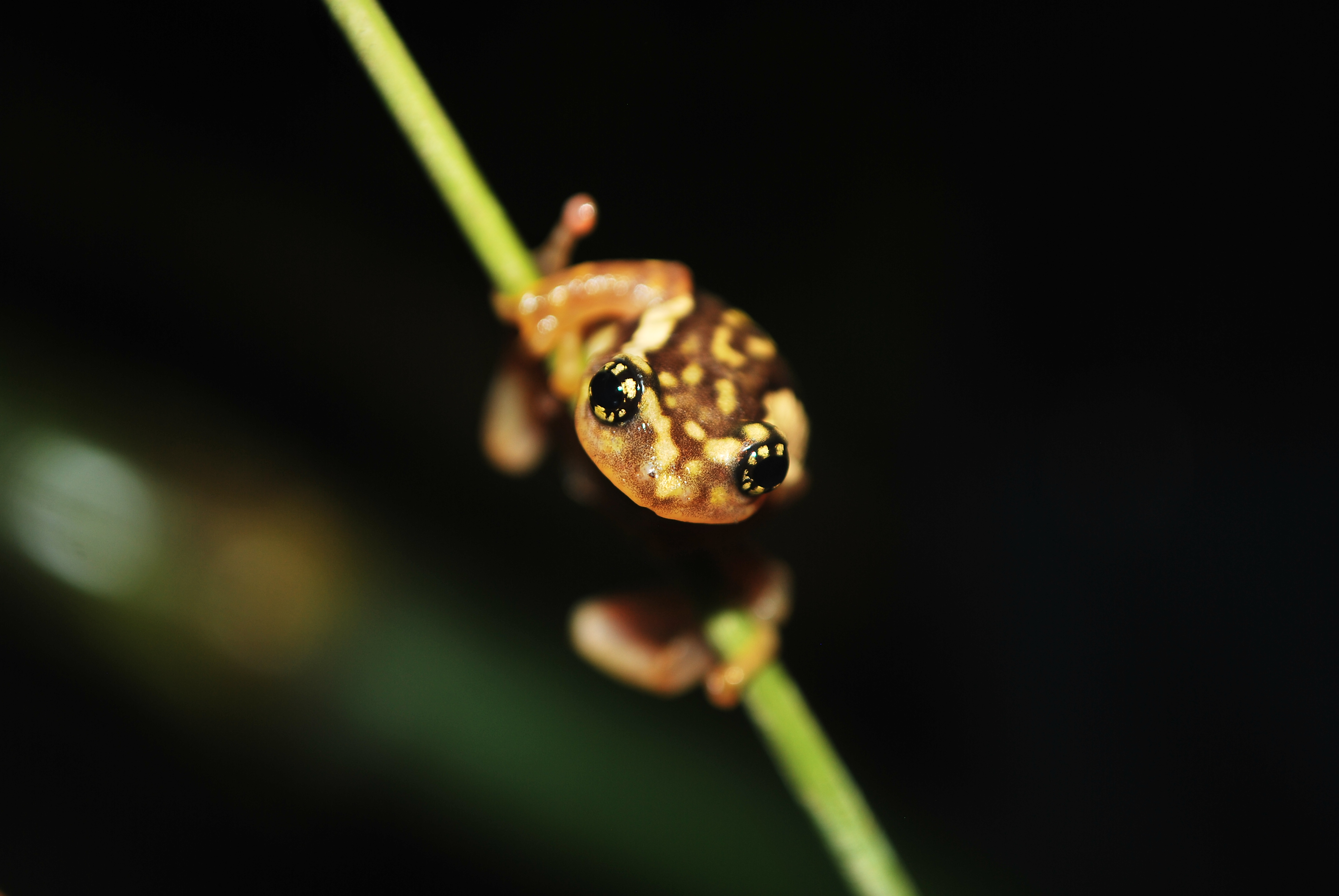
Raorchestes ochlandrae

== Habitat and conservation ==
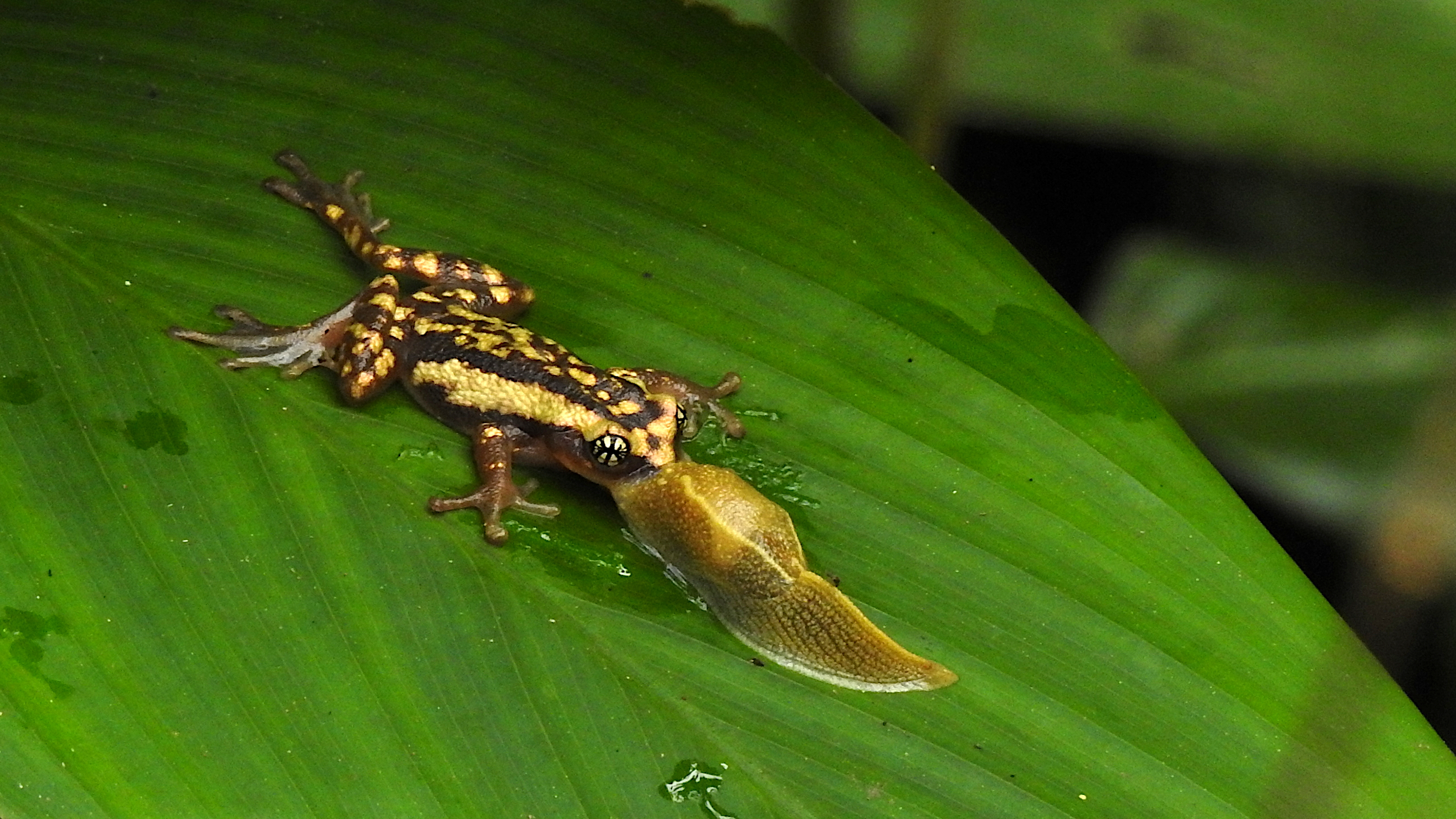
Raorchestes ochlandrae eating a slug

This species inhabits dense stands of the bamboo Ochlandra setigera, growing on forest edges and in more in open habitats. The frogs reside in the hollow tube of internodal region of bamboo about two to three metres above the ground.

The species occurs in the Western Ghats mostly along forest streams and other sites where Ochlandra stands remain.

== Breeding ==
The Ochlandrae reed frog has a unique breeding habit of nesting within the hollow internodes of Ochlandra bamboo culms. Although they have been recorded in internodes of different Ochlandra species, breeding has been recorded so far in Ochlandra setigera. The frogs enter the hollow culms through small holes. Calling males may sit outside the entrance holes. While the entrance holes are towards the bottom of the internodes, eggs are deposited on the inside wall of the bamboo towards the upper side. A clutch size of six eggs has been reported. The presence of frogs in the bamboo indicates parental care by males in this species as in the similar Raorchestes chalazodes, with both species also showing direct development of eggs into juveniles.
