= Myocalandra exarata =

Scientific classification
- Kingdom: Animalia
- Phylum: Arthropoda
- Class: Insecta
- Order: Coleoptera
- Suborder: Polyphaga
- Infraorder: Cucujiformia
- Family: Curculionidae
- Genus: Myocalandra
- Species: M. exarata

Binomial name
- Myocalandra exarata (Boheman, 1838)

Synonyms
- Sitophilus exarata Boheman, 1838

Species of beetle

Myocalandra exarata, is a species of weevil found in India, Sri Lanka, Malay Peninsula, Philippines, New Caledonia, Madagascar, Seychelles, Mauritius and Marianas Islands.

== Biology ==
It is a black colored beetle. Both adult and larvae are about 15 mm in length. Primarily a borer of Bambusa vulgaris, it is also observed from stored reed, Ochlandra travancorica.
