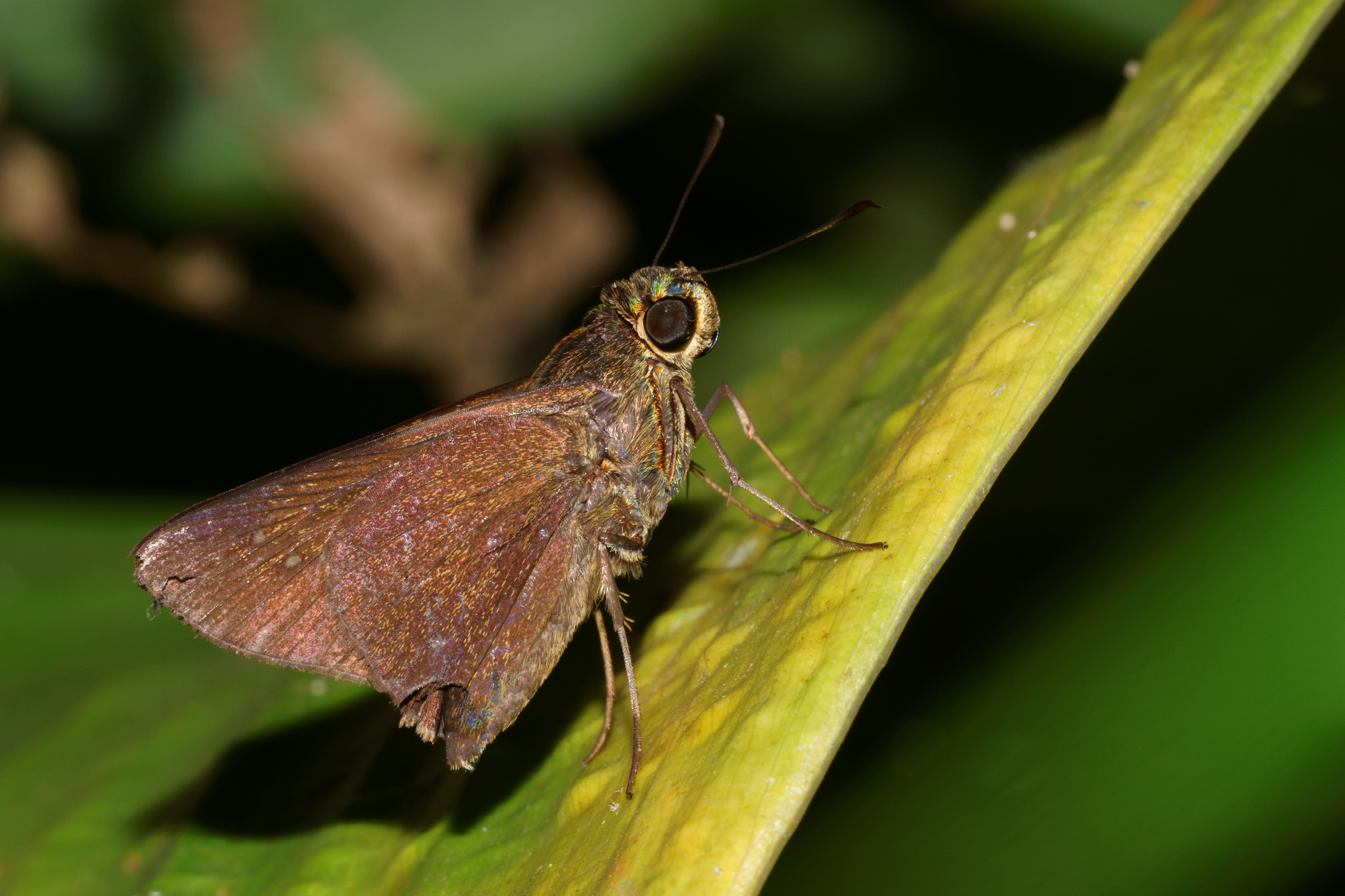
- In Kadavoor

Scientific classification
- Kingdom: Animalia
- Phylum: Arthropoda
- Class: Insecta
- Order: Lepidoptera
- Family: Hesperiidae
- Genus: Baoris
- Species: B. farri

Binomial name
- Baoris farri (Moore, 1878)

= Baoris farri =

Paintbrush swift

Species of butterfly

Paintbrush Swift- Baoris farri from koottanad, Palakkad, Kerala, India

Baoris farri, commonly known as the paintbrush swift, is a species of butterfly belonging to the family Hesperiidae. It is found in India.

== Description ==
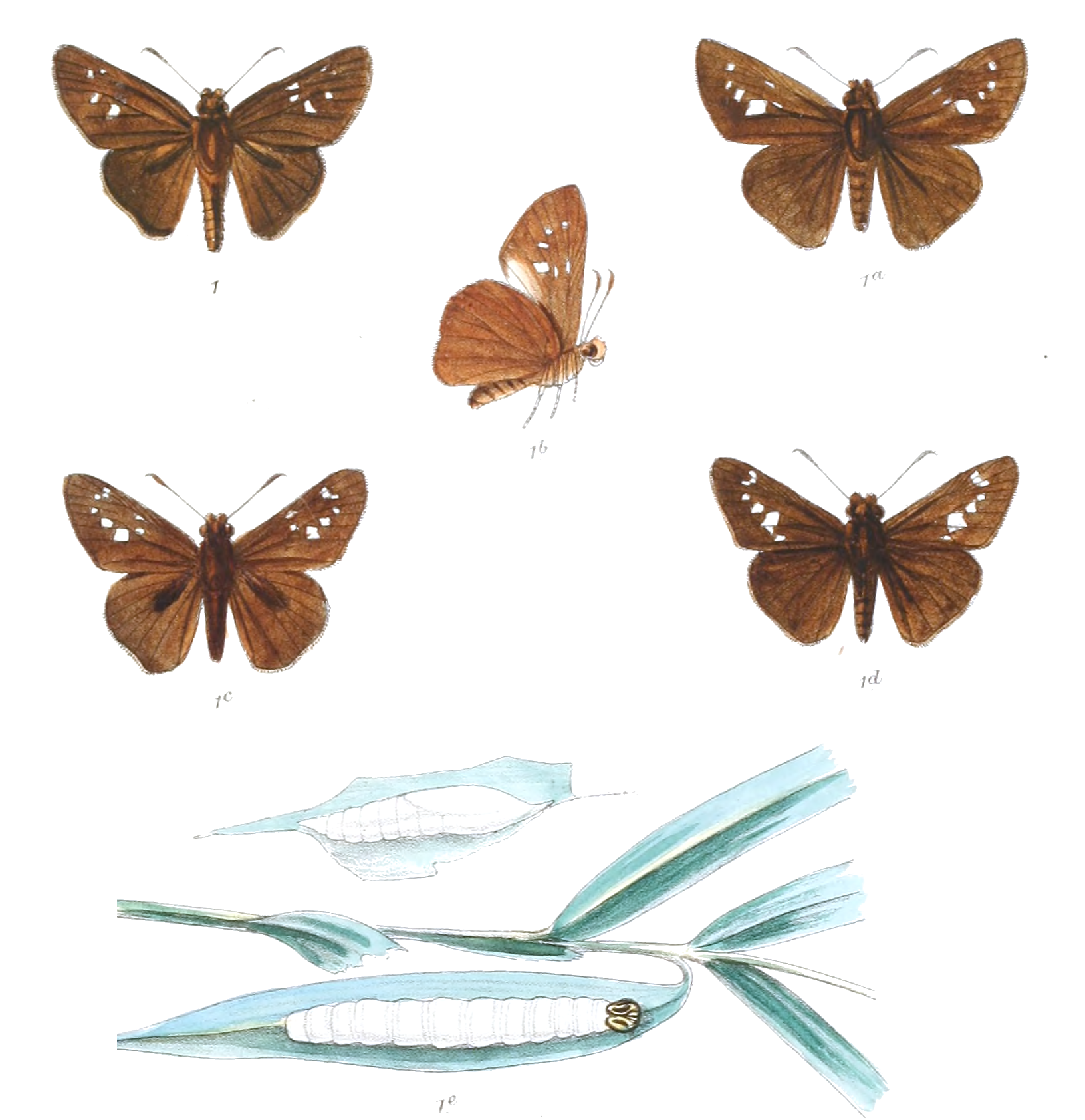

Male and female. Upperside ferruginous-brown, base of both wings olive-brown; cilia yellowish-cinereous: forewing with two pale semi-diaphanous spots at end of the cell, and a discal recurved series of seven spots, the four upper and the seventh smallest, the upper three being contiguous and obliquely before the apex, the sixth below end of cell and the largest. Underside greyer brown in the female: forewing marked as in male, except that the lowest spot is more diffused : hindwing without spots.

— Edward Yerbury Watson

Larvae are known to breed on Ochlandra travancorica, Ochlandra scriptoria, Bambusa striata and Bambusa wamin.
