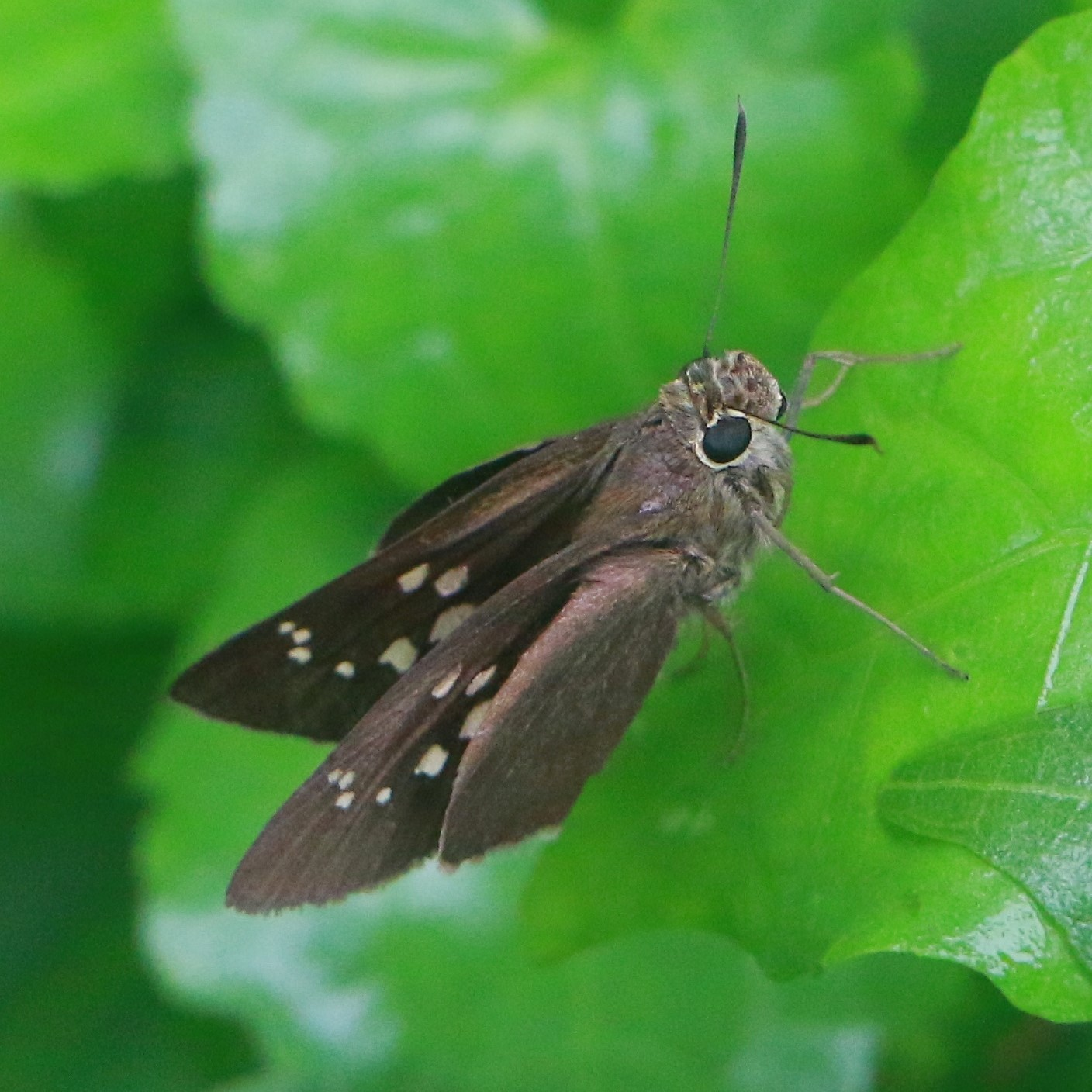
- Baoris farri

Scientific classification
- Kingdom: Animalia
- Phylum: Arthropoda
- Clade: Pancrustacea
- Class: Insecta
- Order: Lepidoptera
- Family: Hesperiidae
- Tribe: Baorini
- Genus: Baoris; Moore, 1881

= Baoris =

Genus of butterflies

Baoris is a genus of grass skippers in the family Hesperiidae.It is found in the Indomalayan realm

== Species ==
- Baoris farri (Moore, 1878)
- Baoris leechii Elwes & Edwards, 1897 West and Central China
- Baoris longistigmata Huang, 1999
- Baoris oceia (Hewitson, 1868)
- Baoris pagana (de Nicéville, 1887)
- Baoris penicillata Moore, [1881] India, Ceylon, India, Thailand, Laos.
- Baoris chapmani Evans, 1937 Burma, Bangladesh
- Baoris unicolor Moore, [1884]

== Biology ==
The larvae feed on Gramineae including Dinochloa, Bambusa, Dendrocalamus, Ochlandra, Saccharum, Oryza
