= Idmon fujianana =

Scientific classification
- Kingdom: Animalia
- Phylum: Arthropoda
- Class: Insecta
- Order: Lepidoptera
- Family: Hesperiidae
- Genus: Idmon
- Species: I. fujianana

Binomial name
- Idmon fujianana (Chou & Huang, 1994)

Synonyms
- Astictopterus fujianus Chou & Huang, 1994; Yanoancistroides fujianus

Species of butterfly

Idmon fujianana is a butterfly in the family Hesperiidae. It is endemic to the province of Fujian, China.
