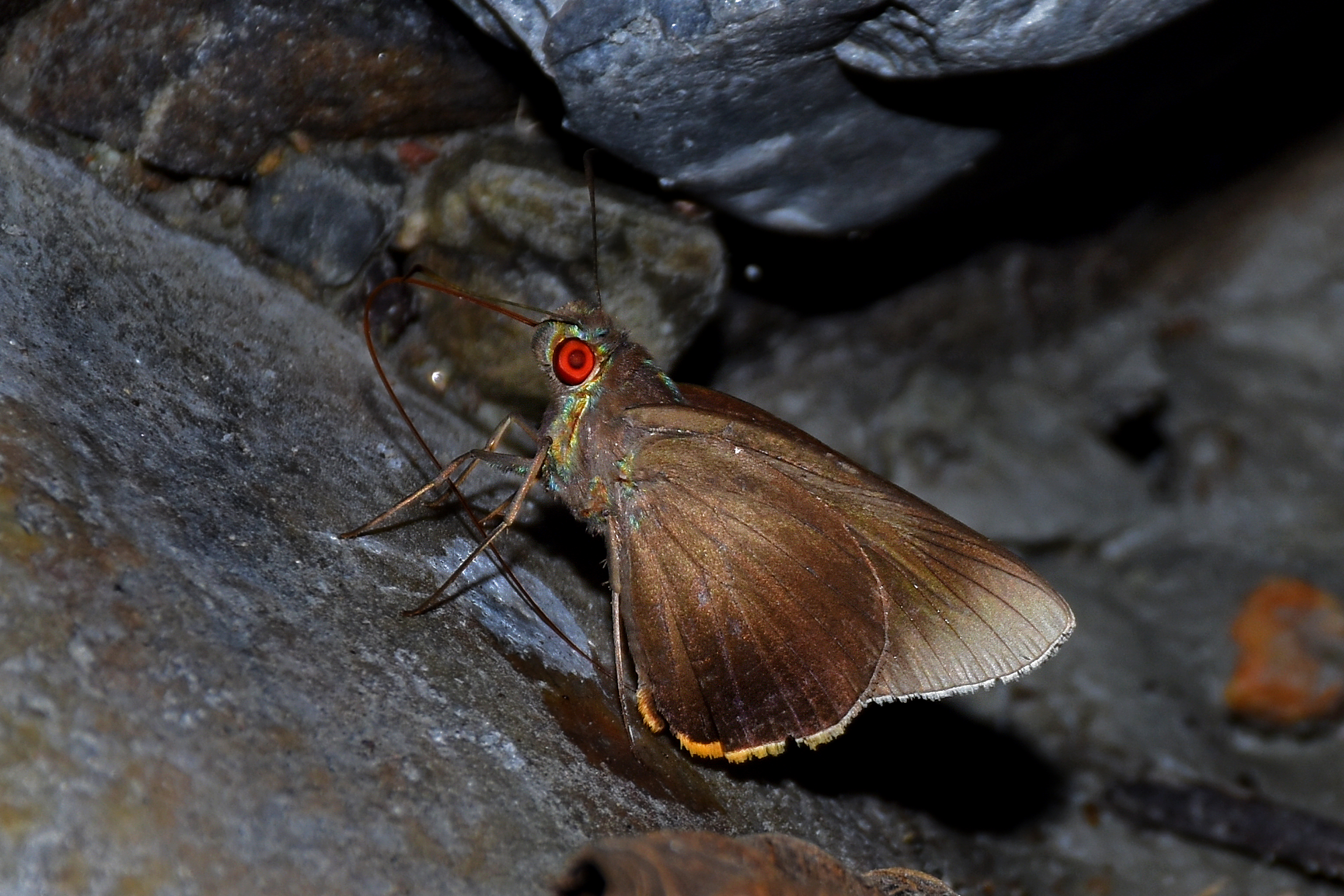

Scientific classification
- Kingdom: Animalia
- Phylum: Arthropoda
- Clade: Pancrustacea
- Class: Insecta
- Order: Lepidoptera
- Family: Hesperiidae
- Genus: Matapa
- Species: M. cresta

Binomial name
- Matapa cresta Evans, 1949

= Matapa cresta =

Species of butterfly

Matapa cresta, the fringed branded redeye, is a butterfly in the family Hesperiidae.

== Distribution ==
It is found from Sikkim eastward to Burma, China, the Andamans, Thailand, Laos, Malaya, Borneo and Sumatra.
