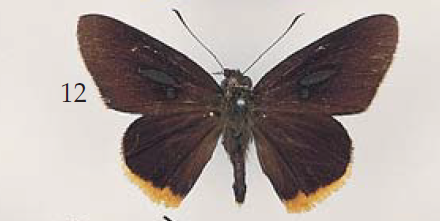

Scientific classification
- Domain: Eukaryota
- Kingdom: Animalia
- Phylum: Arthropoda
- Class: Insecta
- Order: Lepidoptera
- Family: Hesperiidae
- Genus: Matapa
- Species: M. celsina

Binomial name
- Matapa celsina (C. Felder & R. Felder, [1867])

Synonyms
- Hesperia celsina Felder, 1867; Hesperia hyrmina Hewitson, 1867; Ismene assur Mabille, 1876

= Matapa celsina =

Species of butterfly

Matapa celsina, is a butterfly in the family Hesperiidae. It is found in Celebes, and the Banggai Islands.

The length of the forewings is 21.1-25 mm for males and 23.2–25.5 mm for females. The upperside is dark brown with greenish sheen. Tip of abdomen is yellow.
