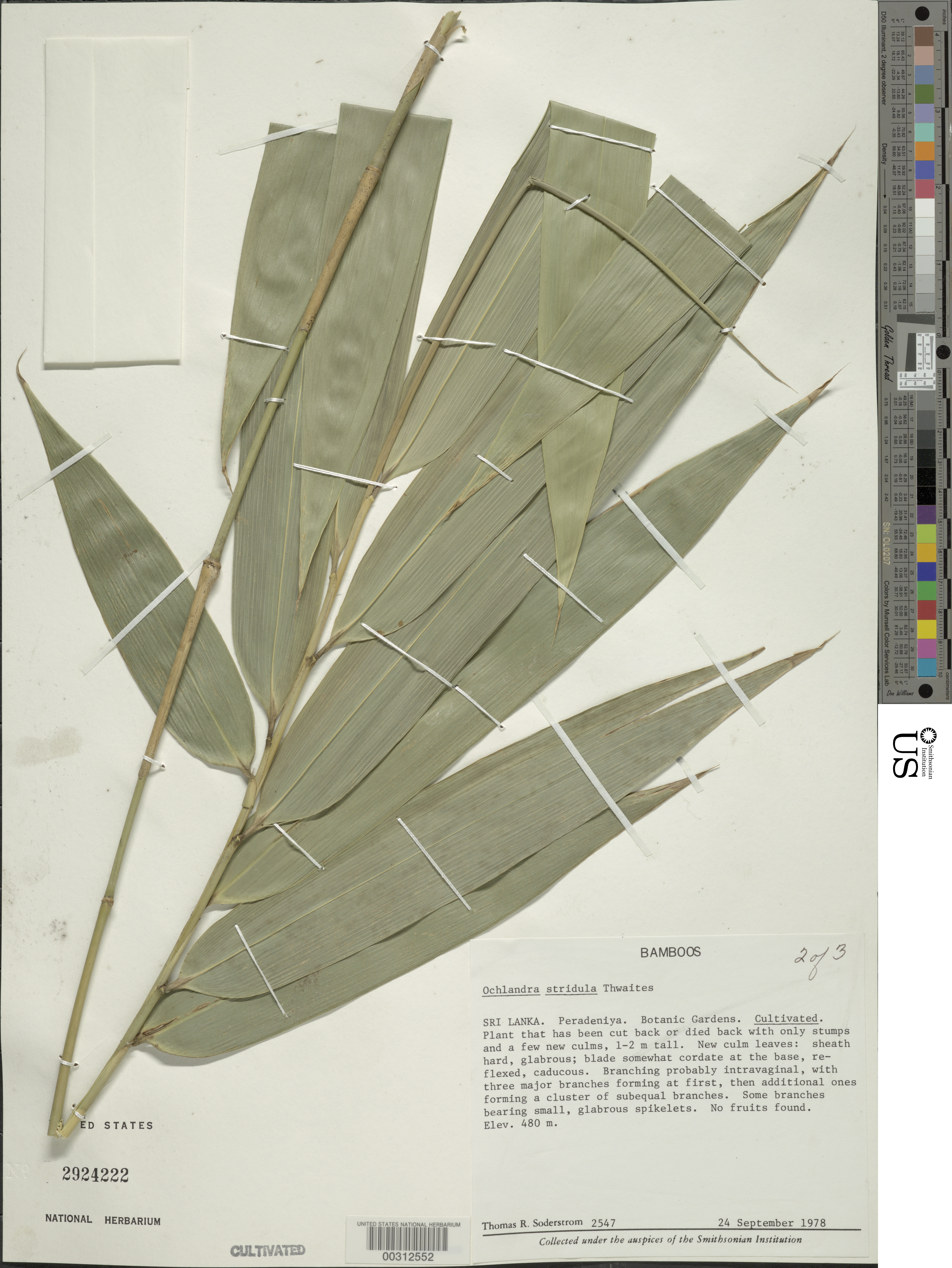

Scientific classification
- Kingdom: Plantae
- Clade: Tracheophytes
- Clade: Angiosperms
- Clade: Monocots
- Clade: Commelinids
- Order: Poales
- Family: Poaceae
- Genus: Ochlandra
- Species: O. stridula

Binomial name
- Ochlandra stridula Thw.

Synonyms
- Bambusa stridula Moon (invalid); Beesha stridula Munro; Ochlandra stridula var. maculata (Trimen) Gamble; Teinostachyum maculatum Trimen

= Ochlandra stridula =

Species of grass

Ochlandra stridula, the Ceylon reed-bamboo, reed bamboo or forest bamboo, is a species of bamboo in the grass family). It is endemic to Sri Lanka. It can be found extensively in Ratnapura and Kegalle districts, in waste lands of rainforest and also along stream banks and in forest gaps.

== Habit ==
Ochlandra stridula is a short, small, pale green shrubby bamboo about 2-6m tall. Clumps are crowded and are composed of a large number of closely growing culms .

== Appearance ==
Culm is pale green in color, which becomes brown when dried. Surface is rough and the culms are straight. Internodes are about 20–25 cm in length and 0.6–2 cm in diameter. Walls are very thin. Aerial roots absent. Branching from mid-culm to top.

Culm sheath is green in young plants, the straw becomes colored when mature. Culm sheath is triangular and broad at base, curved downwards at the tip. The sheath is small and narrow-lengths of sheath proper 10–15 cm long and 4–8 cm wide. Auricles are small and sickle-shaped. Upper surface of the culm sheath is hairy and lower surface is without hairs. Sheaths are persistent.

== Uses ==
Ochlandra stridula are used to make wattle-and-daub walls and fences. They are woven into mats, window blinds, screens and partitions and the leaves are used for thatching.
