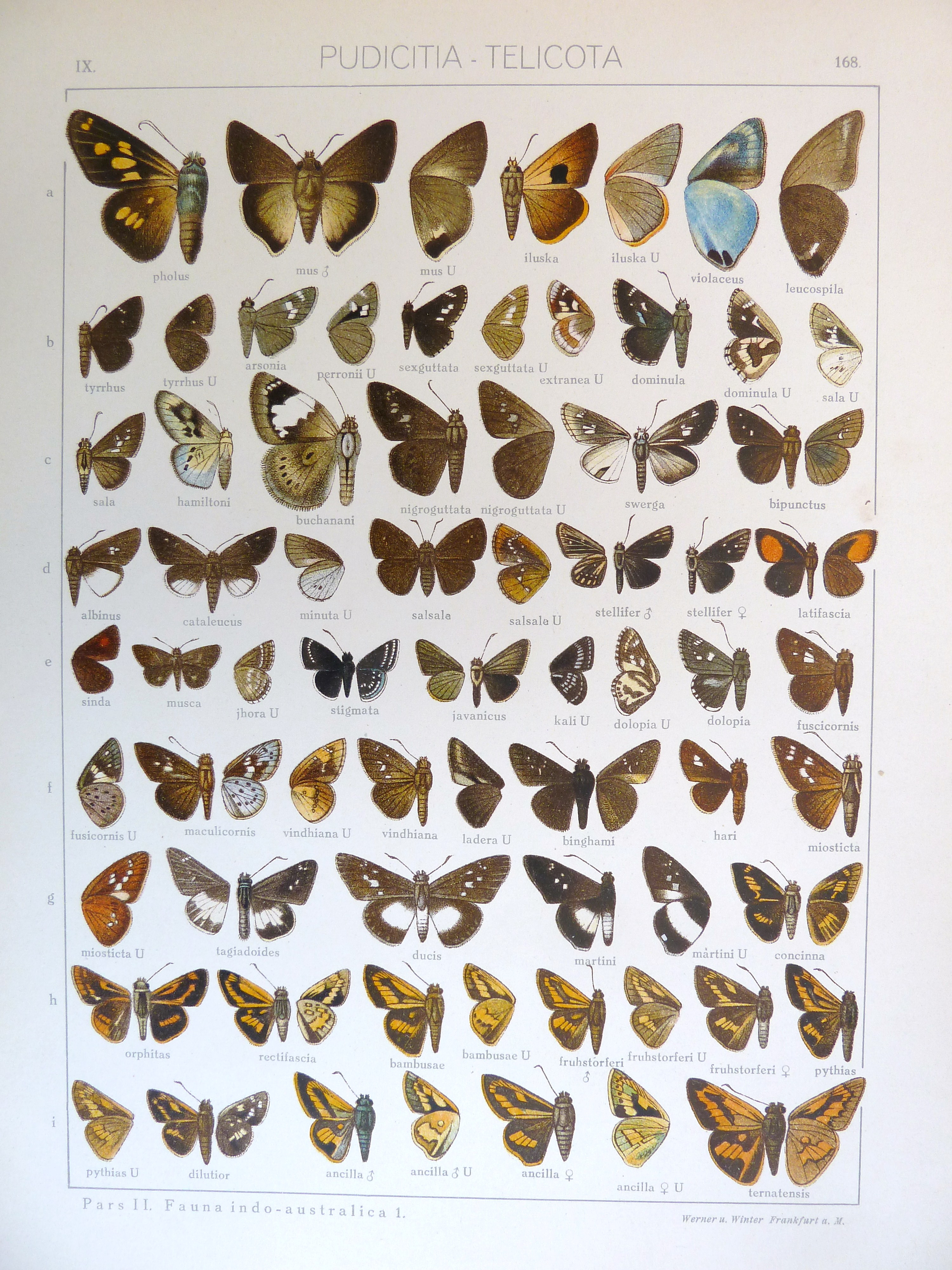
- Idmon obliquans in Seitz

Scientific classification
- Kingdom: Animalia
- Phylum: Arthropoda
- Class: Insecta
- Order: Lepidoptera
- Family: Hesperiidae
- Genus: Idmon
- Species: I. obliquans

Binomial name
- Idmon obliquans (Mabille, 1893)

Synonyms
- Astictopterus obliquans Mabille, 1893; Jambrix sindu yamanta Fruhstorfer, 1910

= Idmon obliquans =

Species of butterfly

Idmon obliquans, the small red bob, is a butterfly in the family Hesperiidae. It was described by Paul Mabille in 1893. It is found in the Indomalayan realm.It closely resembles sindu likewise exhibiting a red spot on the forewing.

== Subspecies ==
- Idmon obliquans obliquans (southern Burma, Thailand, Malaysia, Singapore, Sumatra, Bangka, Java)
- Idmon obliquans yamanta (Fruhstorfer, 1910) (Borneo) broader red band of the forewing
