= Idmon bicolora =

Scientific classification
- Kingdom: Animalia
- Phylum: Arthropoda
- Class: Insecta
- Order: Lepidoptera
- Family: Hesperiidae
- Genus: Idmon
- Species: I. bicolora

Binomial name
- Idmon bicolora XL. Fan & M. Wang, 2007

Species of butterfly

Idmon bicolora is a butterfly in the family Hesperiidae. It was described by XL. Fan and M. Wang in 2007. It is found in China (it was described from Ruyuan County in Guangdong).
