= Idmon sinica =

Scientific classification
- Kingdom: Animalia
- Phylum: Arthropoda
- Class: Insecta
- Order: Lepidoptera
- Family: Hesperiidae
- Genus: Idmon
- Species: I. sinica

Binomial name
- Idmon sinica (H. Huang, 1997)

Synonyms
- Yania sinica H. Huang, 1997; Yanoancistroides sinica

Species of butterfly

Idmon sinica is a butterfly in the family Hesperiidae. It was first described by H. Huang in 1997. It is found in China.
