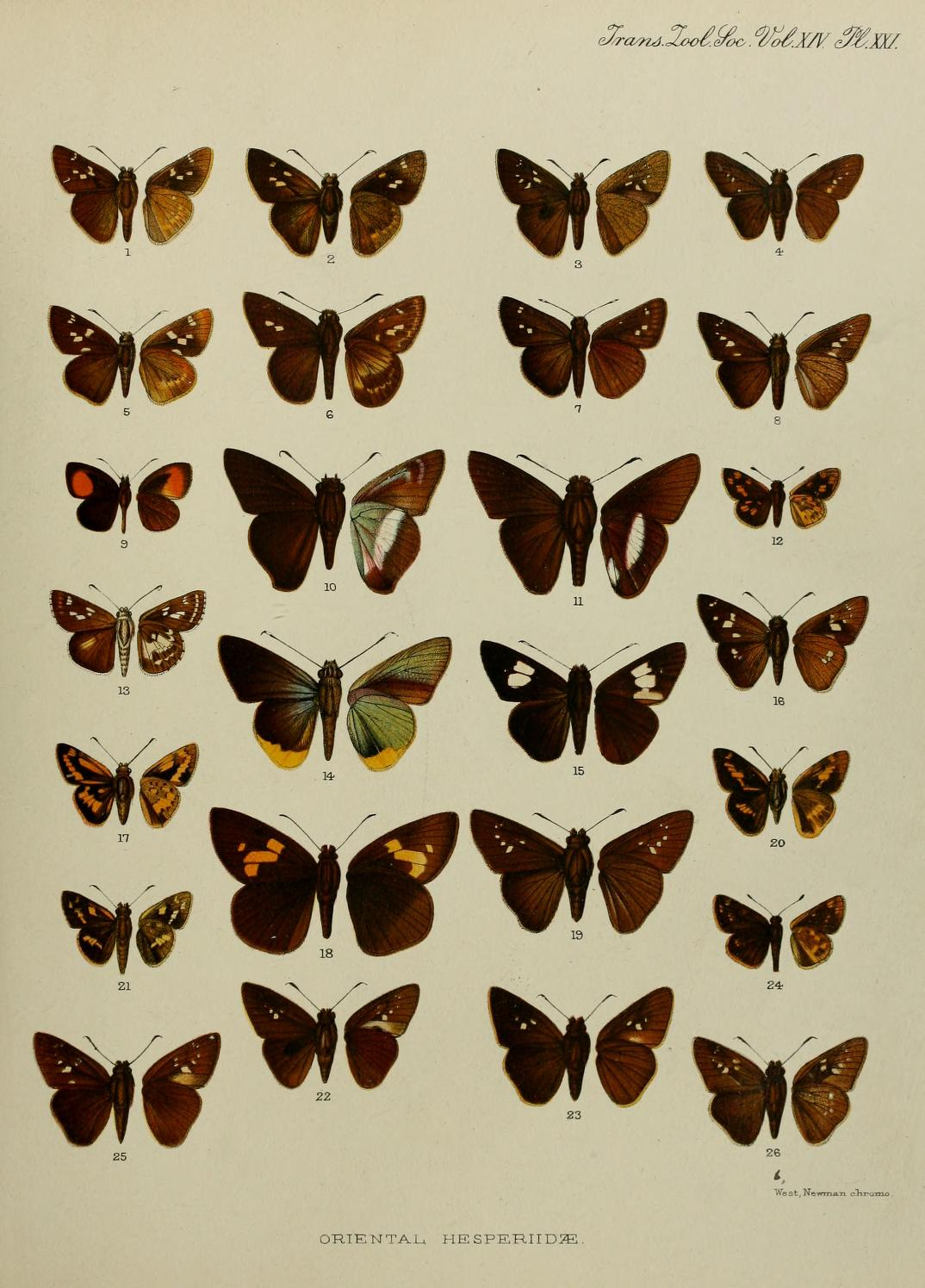
- Idmon latifascia (figure 9)

Scientific classification
- Kingdom: Animalia
- Phylum: Arthropoda
- Class: Insecta
- Order: Lepidoptera
- Family: Hesperiidae
- Tribe: Ancistroidini
- Genus: Idmon de Nicéville, 1895

Species
- see text

Synonyms
- Yania Huang, 1997 (preocc.); Yanoancistroides Huang, 1999

= Idmon (skipper) =

Genus of butterflies

Idmon is a genus of grass skippers in the family Hesperiidae.

== Species ==
- Idmon bicolora XL. Fan & M. Wang, 2007
- Idmon distanti (Shepard, 1937)
- Idmon flavata XL. Fan & M. Wang, 2007
- Idmon fujianana (Chou & Huang, 1994)
- Idmon latifascia (Elwes & Edwards, 1897)
- Idmon obliquans (Mabille, 1893)
- Idmon sinica (H. Huang, 1997)
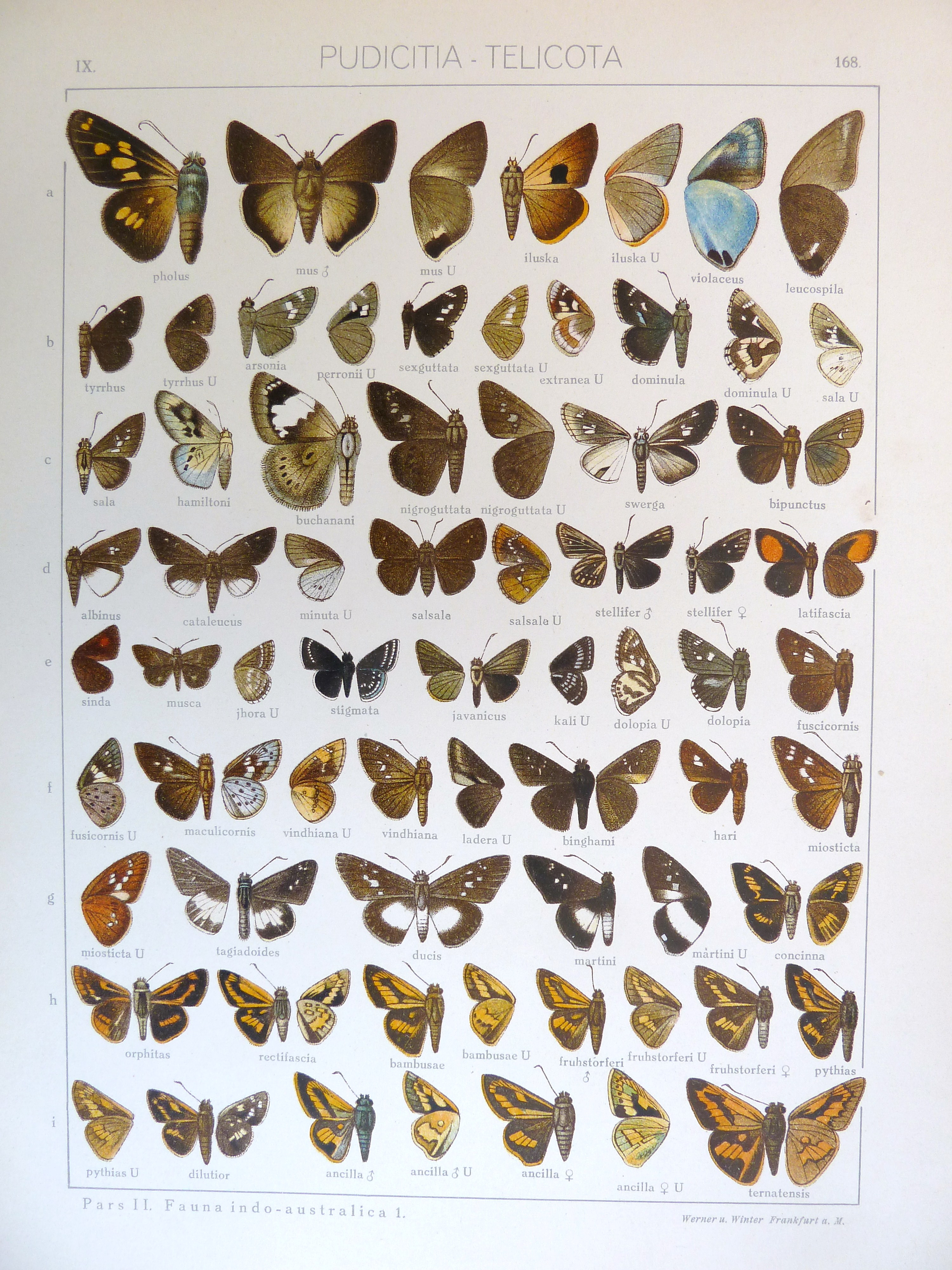
Idmon latifascia and Idmon obliquans (Mabille, 1893) in Seitz
