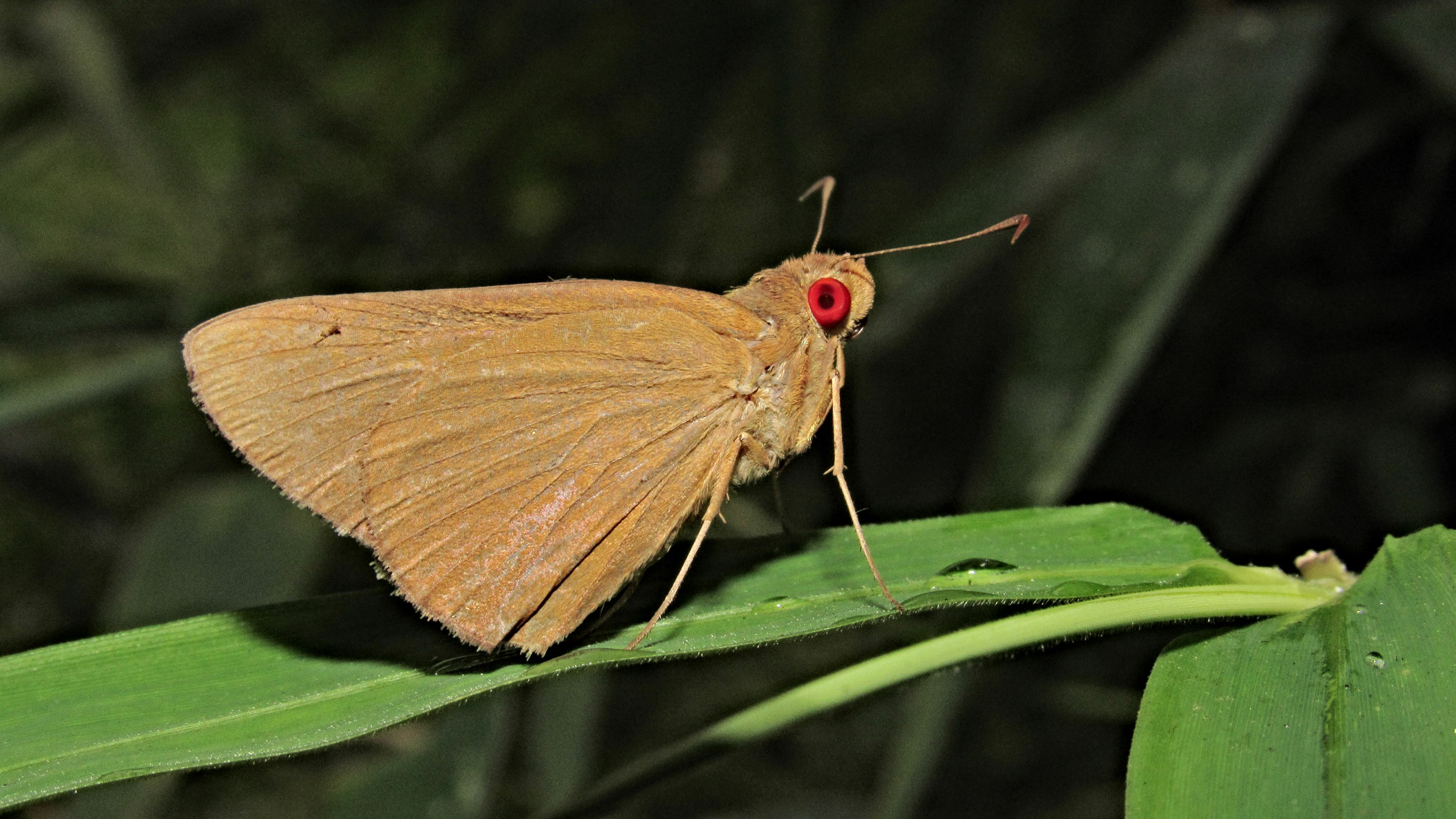

Scientific classification
- Kingdom: Animalia
- Phylum: Arthropoda
- Clade: Pancrustacea
- Class: Insecta
- Order: Lepidoptera
- Family: Hesperiidae
- Genus: Matapa
- Species: M. aria

Binomial name
- Matapa aria (Moore, 1865)

Synonyms
- Ismene aria Moore, [1866]; Hesperia neglecta Mabille, 1876

= Matapa aria =

Common redeye

Species of butterfly

Matapa aria, the common redeye, is a species of butterfly belonging to the family Hesperiidae. It is found in India and Southeast Asia.

== Description ==
Male and female chocolate brown.

Male. Upperside, pale brown; forewing with a short impressed comma-like grey streak obliquely beneath the cell. Cilia yellowish white. Underside bright ferruginous brown. Palpi ferruginous brown.

Female. Upperside dark chocolate brown without the impressed streak; cilia of hindwing pale orange yellow. Underside bright ferruginous brown.

The larvae feed on Bambusa striata, Ochlandra travancorica and Ochlandra scriptoria.

Life cycle

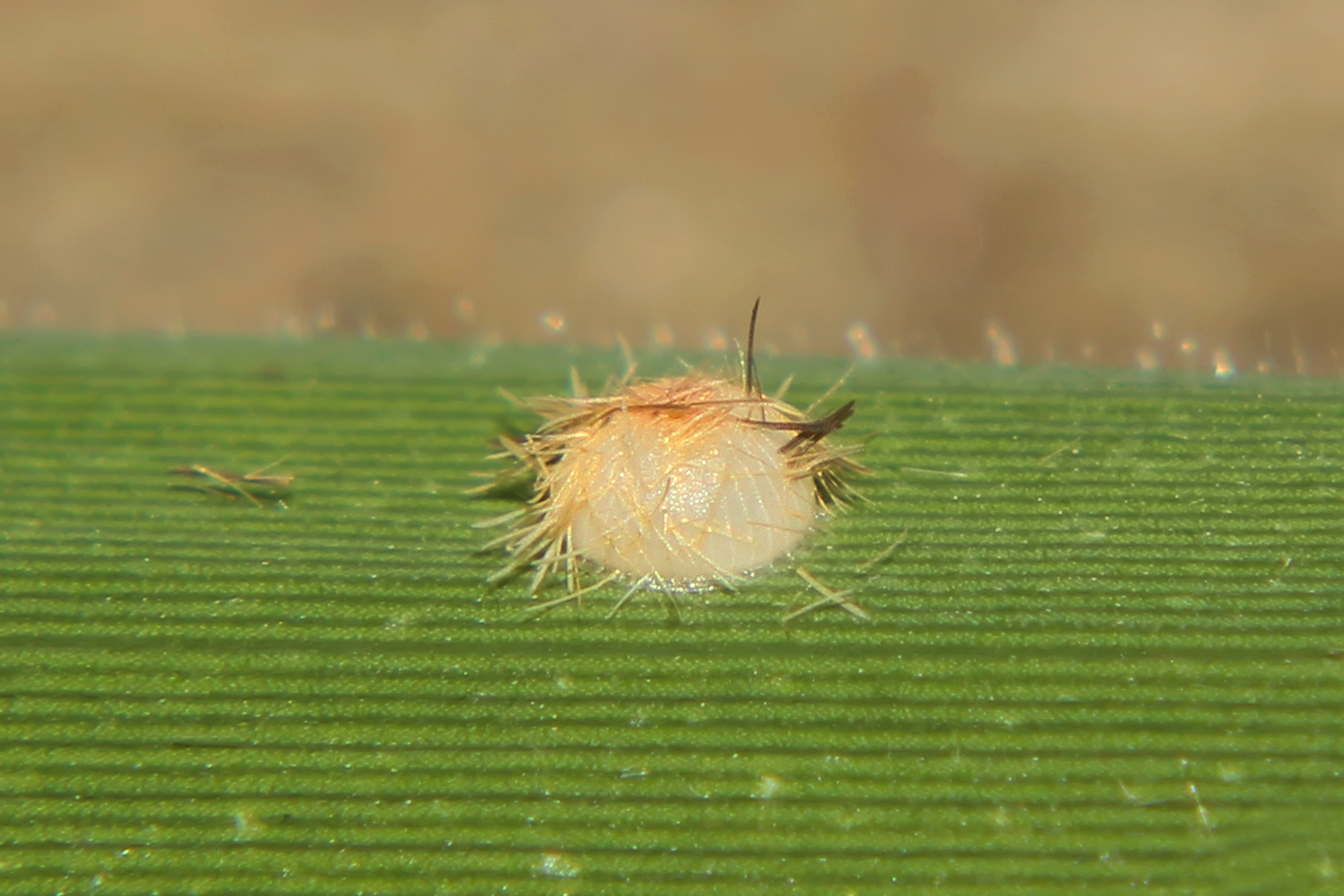
Egg

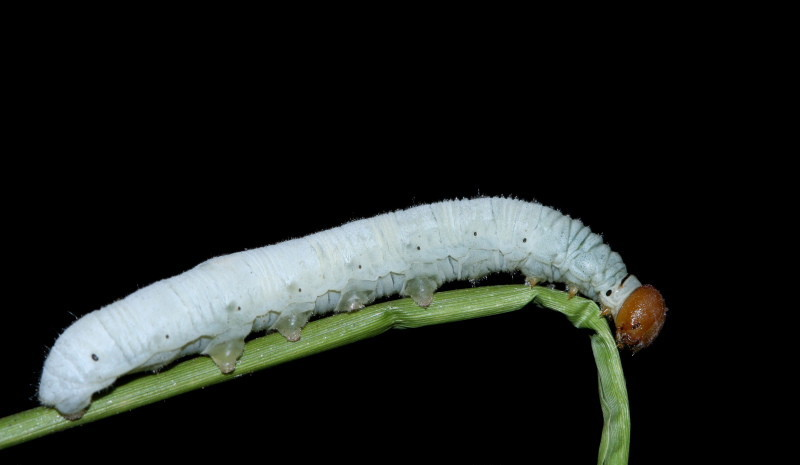
Larva

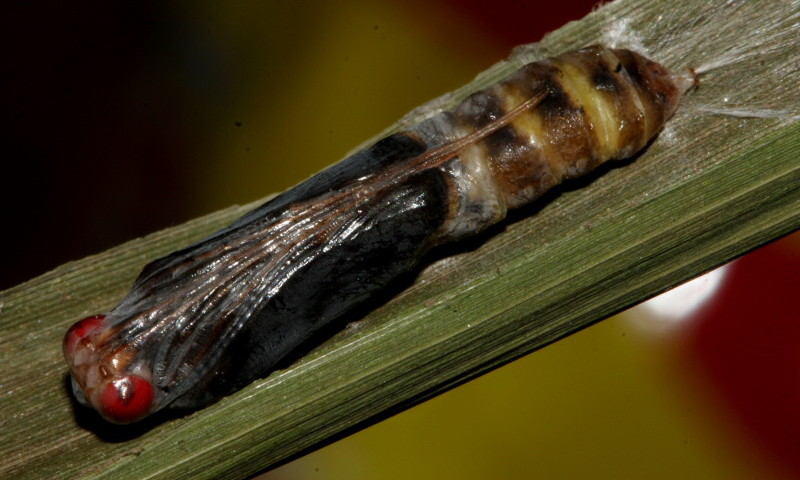
Pupa

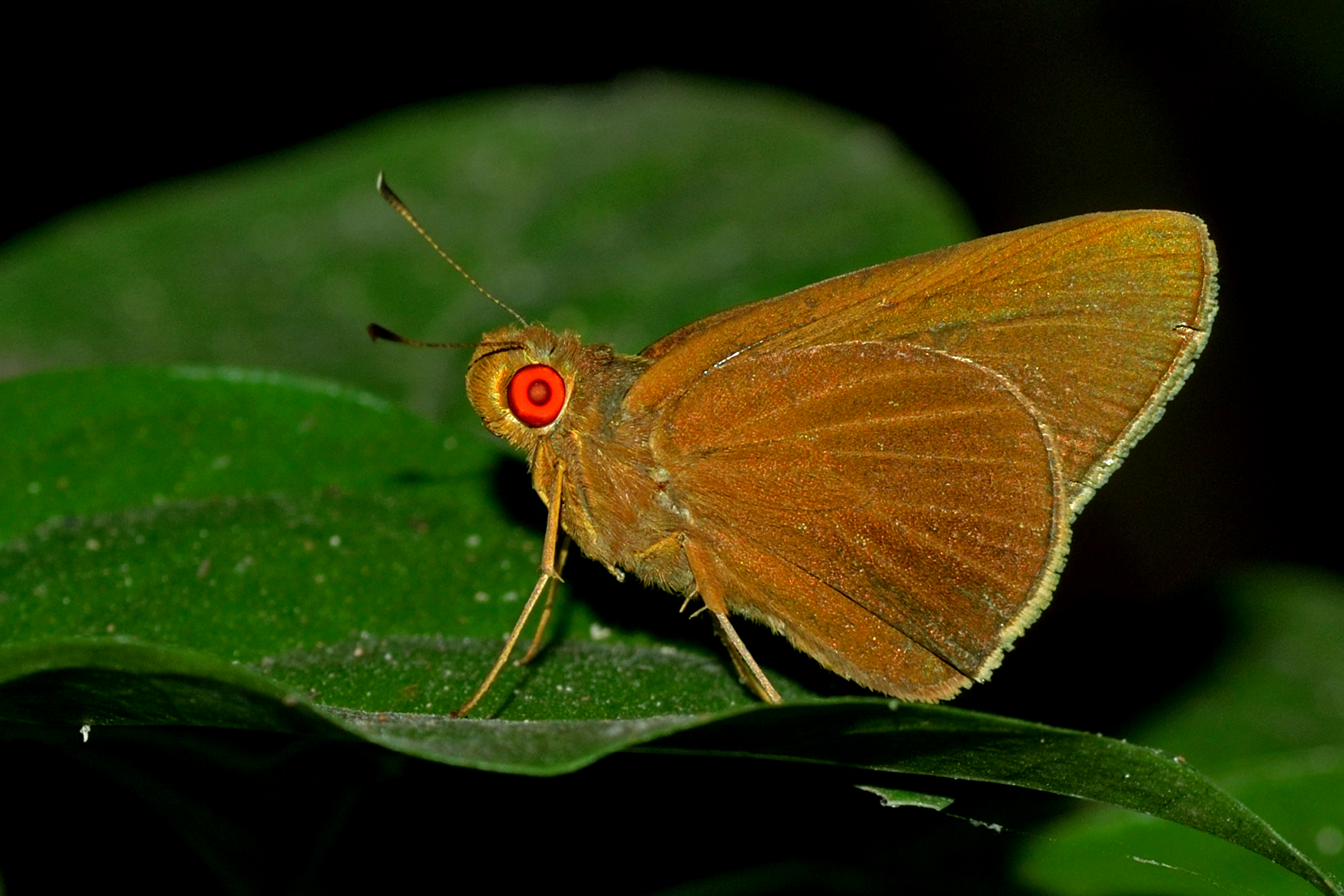
Imago
