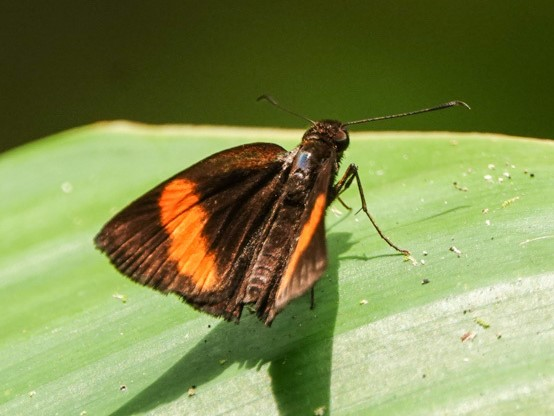
- Upperside

Scientific classification
- Kingdom: Animalia
- Phylum: Arthropoda
- Clade: Pancrustacea
- Class: Insecta
- Order: Lepidoptera
- Family: Hesperiidae
- Genus: Koruthaialos
- Species: K. sindu

Binomial name
- Koruthaialos sindu (C. & R. Felder, 1860)

Synonyms
- Astictopterus sindu C. & R. Felder, 1860

= Koruthaialos sindu =

Species of butterfly

Koruthaialos sindu, the bright red velvet bob, is a butterfly belonging to the family Hesperiidae. The species was first described by father and son entomologists Cajetan and Rudolf Felder in 1860. This species is at once recognisable by the forewing, which is otherwise unicoloured blackish brown, exhibiting a miniate ( red lead or vermilion colour) transverse diffuse spot which is distinct on both sides.The exception is Idmon obliquans
