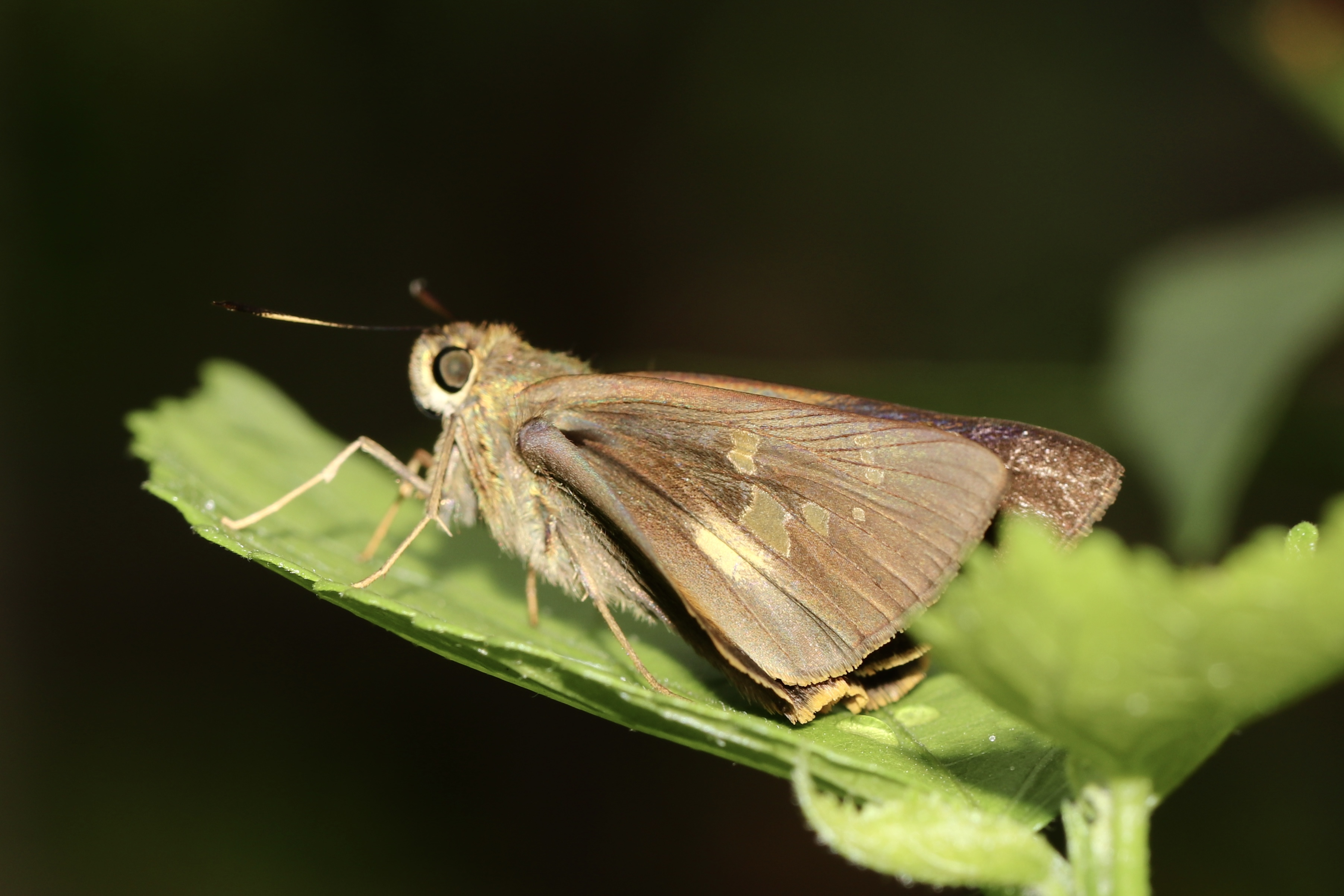

Scientific classification
- Kingdom: Animalia
- Phylum: Arthropoda
- Clade: Pancrustacea
- Class: Insecta
- Order: Lepidoptera
- Family: Hesperiidae
- Genus: Baoris
- Species: B. pagana

Binomial name
- Baoris pagana de Nicéville, 1887

= Baoris pagana =

Species of butterfly

Baoris pagana is a species of skipper butterfly found in the Indomalayan realm.(Nepal, NE.India, Borneo)

== Description ==
Male. Upperside: both wings rich dark brown glossed with purple, the base clothed with long deep ochreous-ferruginous setae. Cilia ochreous-yellow in the forewing, becoming orange towards the anal angle in the hindwing. Forewing with a spot at the end of the cell sometimes almost quadrate, sometimes constricted in the middle and forming a figure of 8, sometimes quite divided into two spots; three small subapical dots; three increasing discal spots, the anterior one sometimes absent; a spot placed above and against the middle of the submedian nervure, usually round, sometimes oval, rarely entirely absent; all these spots semi-transparent yellow. Hindwing unmarked. Underside: both wings ochreous-brown without any purple gloss, the yellow setae also absent. Forewing with the base (all except the costa) black; the semitransparent spots as above, but the one in the submedian interspace developed into a large diffused patch. Hindwing unmarked. Female with the wings a little broader, otherwise exactly as in the male.

— Edward Yerbury Watson
