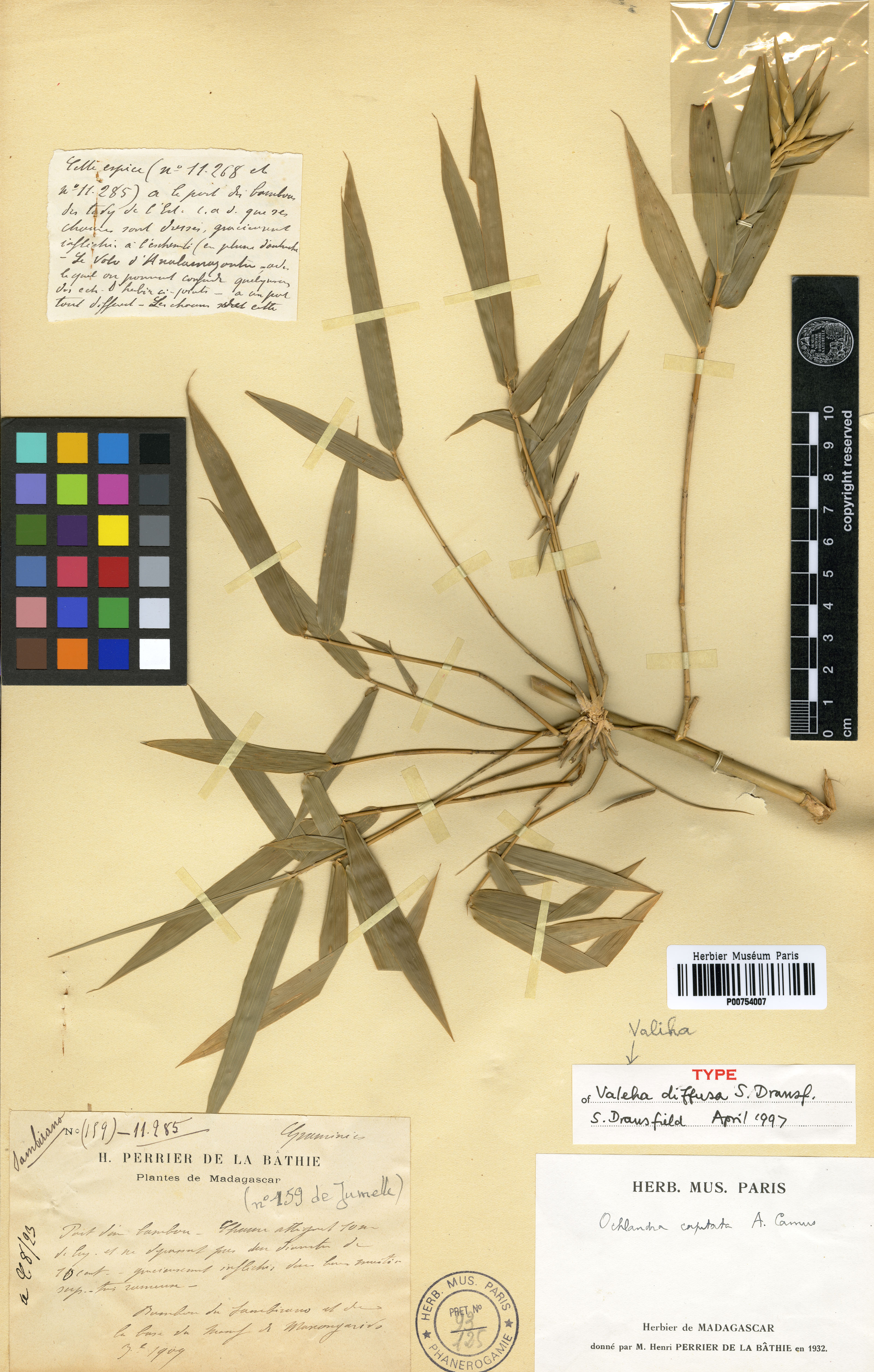
- Type specimen of Valiha diffusa at the MNHN, Paris

Scientific classification
- Kingdom: Plantae
- Clade: Tracheophytes
- Clade: Angiosperms
- Clade: Monocots
- Clade: Commelinids
- Order: Poales
- Family: Poaceae
- Genus: Valiha
- Species: V. diffusa

Binomial name
- Valiha diffusa S.Dransf.

= Valiha diffusa =

Species of grass

Valiha diffusa is a bamboo species in the genus Valiha found in Madagascar.

Valiha diffusa is a locally useful wild source of construction material. The Madagascan valiha is a stringed tube zither traditionally made from the bamboo.
