= Baoris penicillata =

Paintbrush swift

Scientific classification
- Kingdom: Animalia
- Phylum: Arthropoda
- Clade: Pancrustacea
- Class: Insecta
- Order: Lepidoptera
- Family: Hesperiidae
- Genus: Baoris
- Species: B. penicillata

Binomial name
- Baoris penicillata (Moore, 1881)

Species of butterfly

Baoris penicillata, the Paintbrush swift, is a species of butterfly belonging to the family Hesperiidae. It is found in India, Sri Lanka, Thailand, Malaysia, Myanmar, Vietnam, Laos, and recently from China.

Wingspan is about 32-38mm.In penicillata the under surface is more or less strewn with greyish- white, Three subspecies recognized.

- Baoris penicillata brenda Evans, 1937
- Baoris penicillata chapmani Evans, 1937
- Baoris penicillata unicolor Moore, 1883
