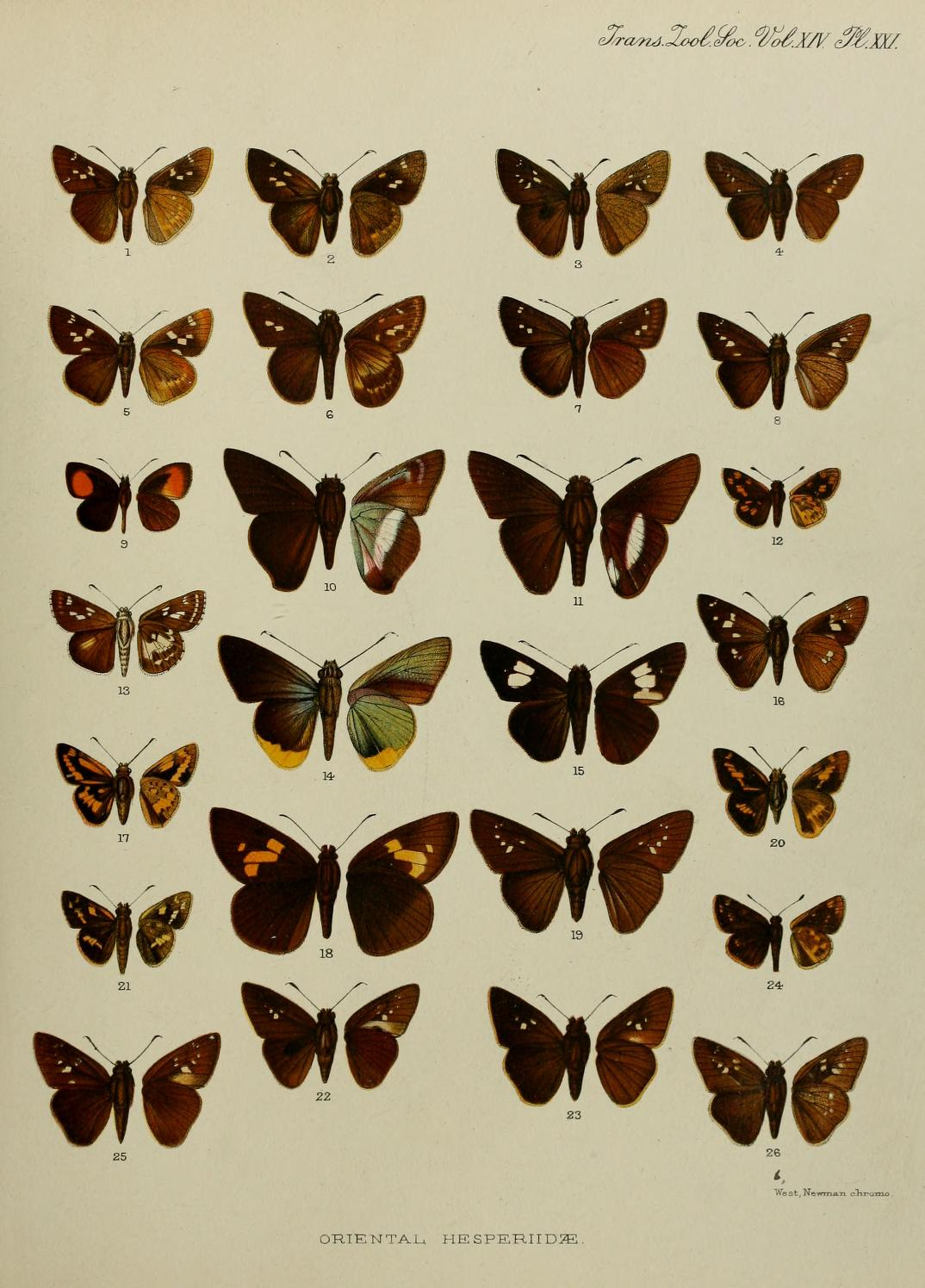
- From Elwes and Edwards' 1897 article

Scientific classification
- Kingdom: Animalia
- Phylum: Arthropoda
- Class: Insecta
- Order: Lepidoptera
- Family: Hesperiidae
- Genus: Idmon
- Species: I. latifascia

Binomial name
- Idmon latifascia Elwes & Edwards, 1897

= Idmon latifascia =

Species of butterfly

Idmon latifascia is a butterfly in the family Hesperiidae. It was described by Henry John Elwes and James Edwards in 1897. It is found on Sumatra and Borneo.
