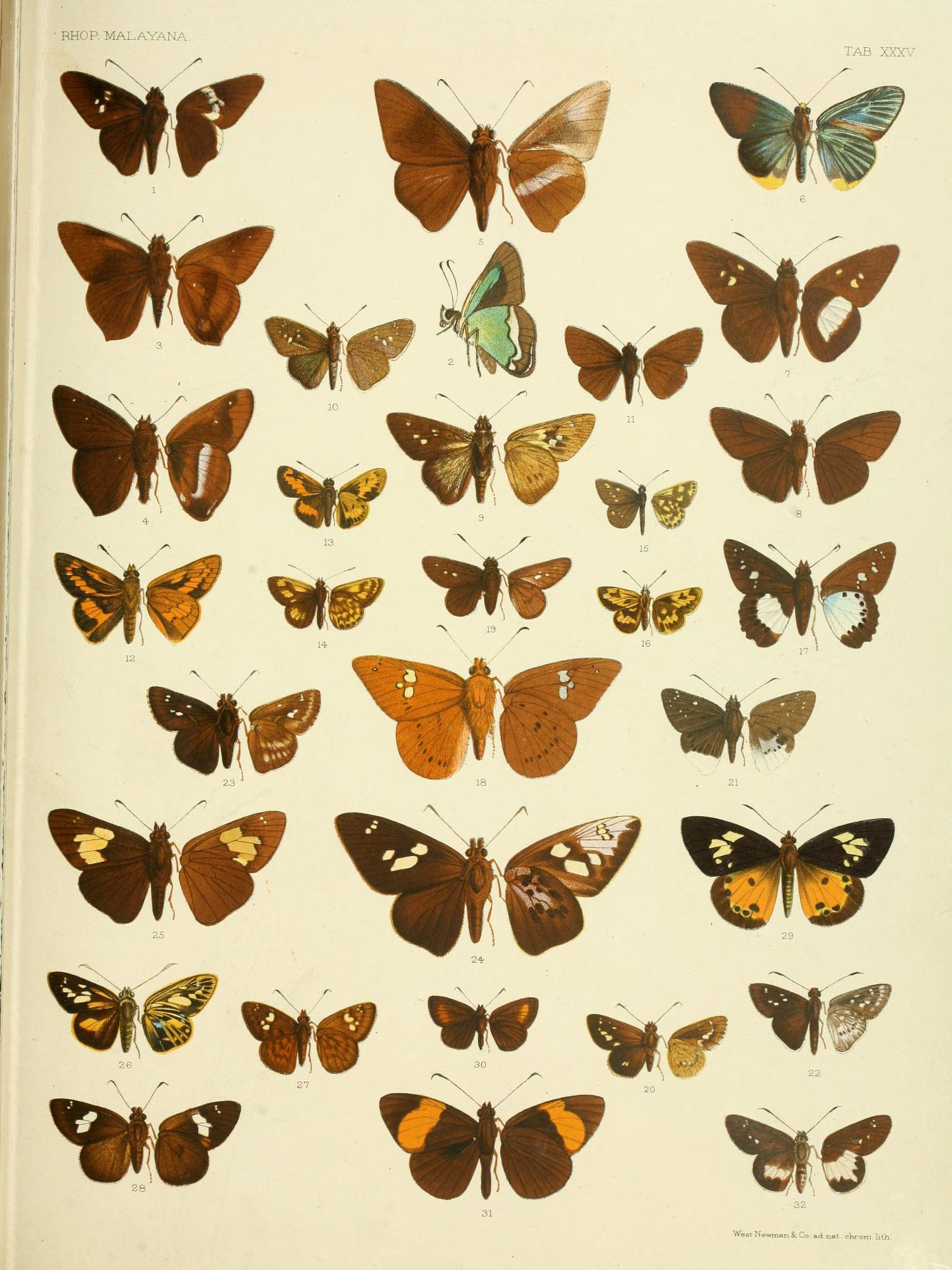
- Idmon distanti in Rhopalocera Malayana (figure 11)
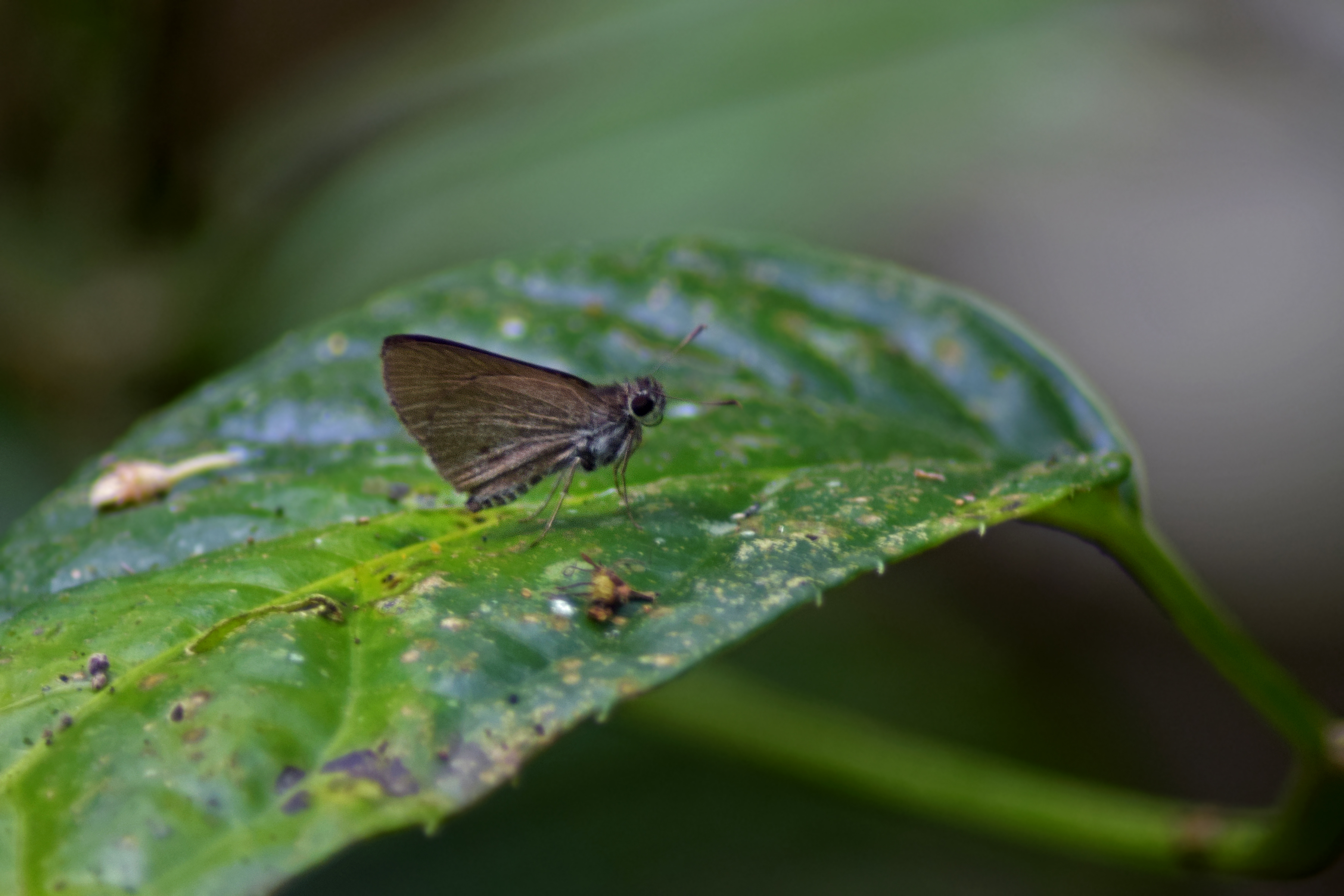

Scientific classification
- Kingdom: Animalia
- Phylum: Arthropoda
- Class: Insecta
- Order: Lepidoptera
- Family: Hesperiidae
- Genus: Idmon
- Species: I. distanti

Binomial name
- Idmon distanti (Shepard, 1937)

Synonyms
- Iambrix distanti Shepard, 1937; Baoris unicolor Distant, 1886

= Idmon distanti =

Species of butterfly

Idmon distanti is a species of butterfly in the family Hesperiidae. It was described by Shepard in 1937. It is found in southern Burma, Thailand, Langkawi, Malaysia, Singapore, Borneo, Sipora, Siberut, Batoe, Sumatra and Nias.
