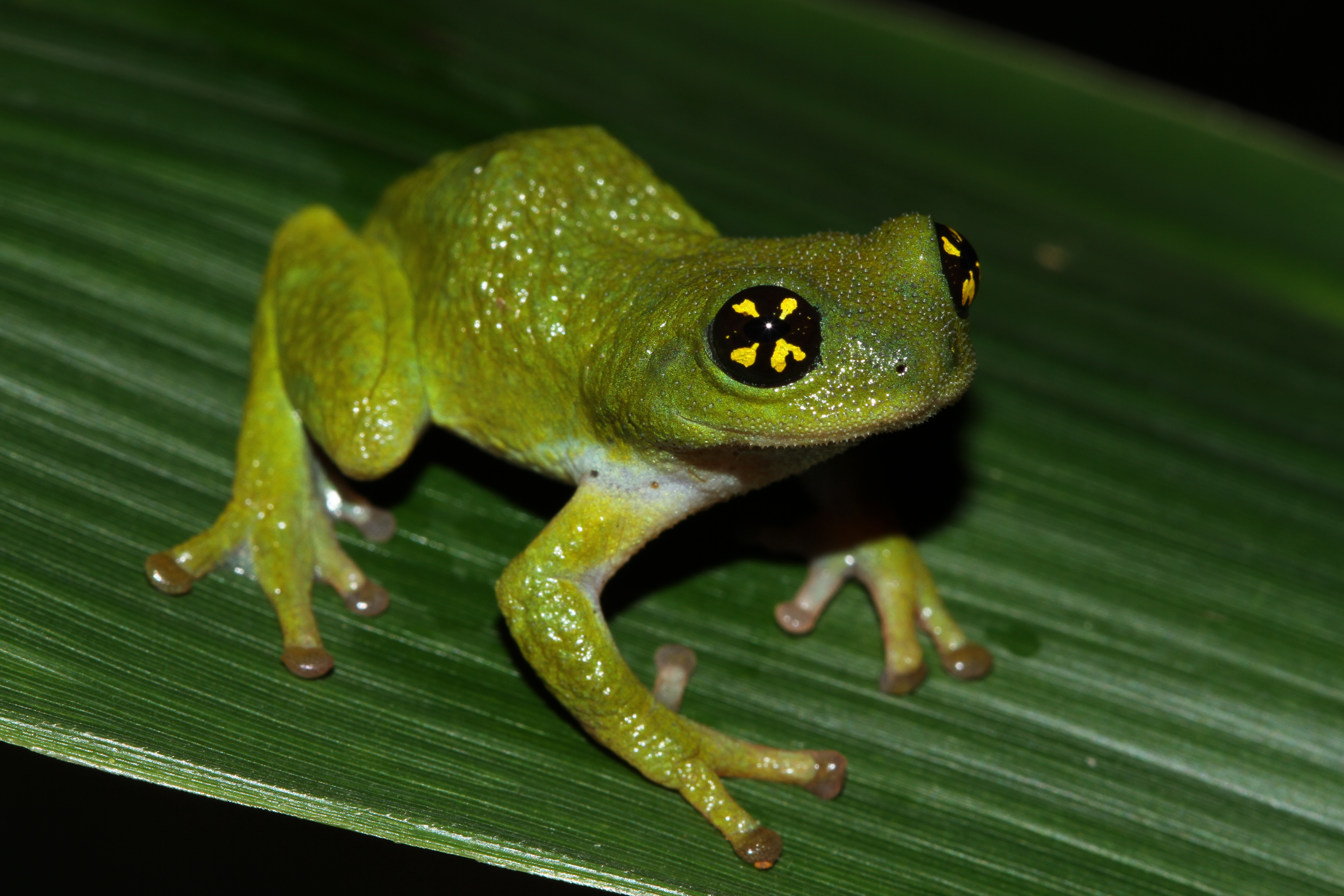
- Adult male

Conservation status
- Vulnerable (IUCN 3.1)

Scientific classification
- Kingdom: Animalia
- Phylum: Chordata
- Class: Amphibia
- Order: Anura
- Family: Rhacophoridae
- Genus: Raorchestes
- Species: R. chalazodes

Binomial name
- Raorchestes chalazodes (Günther, 1876)

Synonyms
- Philautus chalazodes (Günther, 1876)

= Raorchestes chalazodes =

Species of frog from India

Raorchestes chalazodes, also known as Chalazodes bubble-nest frog, white-spotted bush frog, or Günther's bush frog, is a critically endangered species of frog in the family Rhacophoridae. Raorchestes chalazodes is a nocturnal and arboreal species found in the understorey of tropical moist evergreen forest and is endemic to the Western Ghats of India. The specific name chalazodes is composed of the Greek word χάλαζα (chalaza) meaning "lump" and -odes for the derived adjective, reflecting white granulation of the body. It has been observed between 1200 and 1600 meters above sea level.

The original holotype was collected in 1876 by Colonel Richard Henry Beddome in Travancore and given to Albert C. L. G. Günther. Before its rediscovery in 2011 in the Upper Kodayar Region in Tamil Nadu, the species was thought to be extinct. Raorchestes chalazodes make their oviposition sites in the internodes of the Ochlandra travancorica species of bamboo, where the adult male will take care of the egg clutch. Raorchestes chalazodes is also the only species in its genus that is reported to exhibit parental care. It is now considered vulnerable by IUCN.

== Description ==
The overall body coloration of Raorchestes chalazodes is green with a purplish white ventral region and black-blue spots on the groin region. Some distinguishing characteristics of the species is a rounded snout, a lingual papilla on the tongue, and well-developed supernumerary tubercles. Raorchestes chalazodes also has moderate toe webbing. One of its most unique and distinctive traits is its eye: a black iris with golden patches.

=== Holotype ===
The holotype is an adult female collected in Travancore by Colonel Richard Henry Beddome, and given to Albert C. L. G. Günther, who described it. This specimen is 26 mm long with the hind limbs measuring 42 mm long. The dorsal surface is described as a uniform green, whereas the ventral surface is a yellowish-white color. The dorsal surface also has tubercles that look like white spots. These tubercles are presumed to be the reason Gunther named the species "chalazodes".

== Habitat and distribution ==
Raorchestes chalazodes is found in the narrow region of the Western Ghats on the West Coast of peninsular India, where they are restricted to elevations over 1200 m. It lives in the tropical and moist evergreen forest understory. More specifically, Raorchestes chalazodes are found in the endemic understory of the Ochlandra travancorica bamboo that is found in the area. This bamboo forms a shrubby habitat that often forms impenetrable clumps next to stream banks, which offers protection. The frog cannot create its own bamboo holes and must depend on the Nilgiri palm squirrel (Funambulus sublineatus).

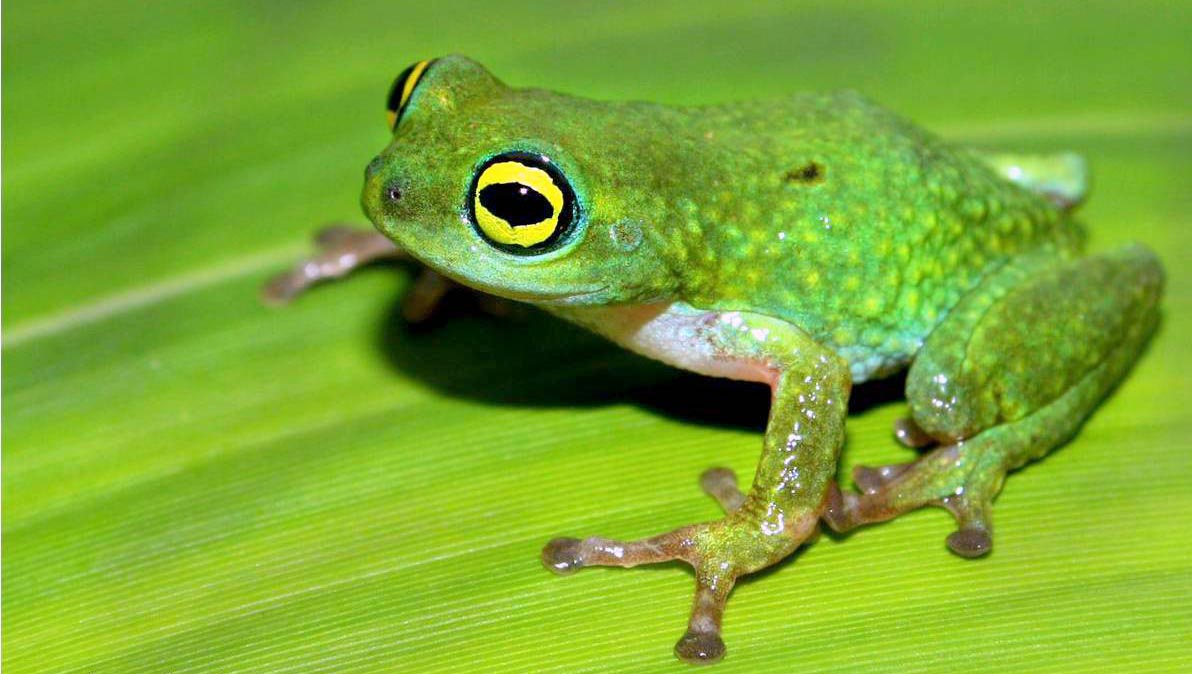
Raorchestes chalazodes from kerala side of agastyamalai hills

== Conservation ==
=== Habitat loss ===
Raorchestes chalazodes is currently classified as vulnerable by the most recent assessment by The IUCN Red List of Threatened Species in 2023. It has suffered from deforestation and other human encroachments. Scientists think that, like other members of its genus, it is susceptible to the fungus Batrachochytrium dendrobatidis. Climate change may alter the bamboo ecology of the area, threatening the frog further. The frog also faces some threat from the annual pilgrimage to Agasthyamala Biosphere Reserve, in which pilgrims leave behind litter and collect firewood.

The Ochlandra travancorica species of bamboo that Raorchestes chalazodes uses for oviposition sites is often harvested for use for biofuel and the manufacturing of paper and pulp. Because of this, Ochlandra travancorica has been severely depleted in the Western Ghats.

=== Conservation efforts ===
In a study on Raorchestes chalazodes in 2018, 43 egg clutches with male guardians were found in 5 km^{2} sampling site at Kalakad Mundanthurai Tiger Reserve. To help with conservation, a mapping of Ochlandra travancorica distribution to identify threatened areas that are not under protection is a vital first step of action. Additionally, there are more viable actions that can be taken to help with the conservation of Raorchestes chalazodes. Bamboo with smaller diameters can be harvested, or harvesting can be banned during the breeding season of Raorchestes chalazodes from May to November. Artificial oviposition sites that resemble those found in the wild can also be created.

== Diet ==
Raorchestes chalazodes mainly consumes invertebrates such as insects and spiders, but have also been observed to eat other invertebrates such as molluscs. Specifically, Raorchestes chalazodes was observed consuming Satiella dekkanensis, a type of snail that does not possess a hard shell. Before the breeding season, adult male frogs will forage for large prey such as Satiella dekkanensis to prepare for the long period of caregiving.

== Mating ==
The breeding season of Raorchestes chalazodes is between the months of May and November. During this breeding season, males will find an internode in Ochlandra travancorica bamboo that has an opening and will vocalize inside the internode to attract females. Because males stay near one internode, females are presumed to be polyandrous and move from one internode to the next with amplexus occurring inside the internode. After the mating season ends, which is the months of November to December, the males will stop vocalizing and vacate the oviposition sites inside the internodes of the bamboo.

== Parental care ==
In Raorchestes chalazodes, there is direct parental care of offspring and in this species, the males are the sole providers of parental care. Males will have varied behavior to try to take care of egg clutches. Some of these strategies include egg attendance, egg guarding, and aggressive behavior to defend the oviposition site or itself. In egg attendance, the adult male frog will remain at a particular oviposition site regardless of time. In egg guarding, the adult male frog will be perched in front of the eggs in the internode presumably to deter a perceived threat. The adult male frog will also exhibit aggressive behavior such as aggressive vocalization or lunging at threats such as conspecific males and arthropods such as katydids and cockroaches entering the internode. During the day, the adult male frog will sleep near the egg clutch with its eyes half closed and limbs brought close to its body. During the time period of parental care, the caregiver may not forage or feed.

This parental care serves as a way to protect the clutch from the many threats the eggs face. The mortality rate of unattended eggs is much higher than those of attended eggs, and the main source of egg mortality is from predation. The main cause of predation is cannibalism from conspecific males who are thought to be unsuccessful in finding a mate and defending their own oviposition site. As a male providing care regularly vocalizes which could signal territory ownership, a lack of vocalization may lead to these cannibalistic males attempting to take of the oviposition site and eating the nutrient rich eggs in the clutch. Egg parasitism from flies and oophagy from ants are also predation issues, but the male caregiver may eat the intruding ants and flies, which serves as a form of sustenance. Another cause of egg mortality is fungal infection.

=== Oviposition sites ===
Nests are made in the internodes of the Ochlandra travancorica species of bamboo. The adult frogs can get in through a small opening near the base of the internode. It is hypothesized that if the internode has an opening at the top, water could collect inside and drown the froglets. The insides of the oviposition sites have lower temperature and higher humidity compared to the outside. This higher humidity benefits the frog eggs by reducing water loss from evaporation. The eggs laid are also attached to the inner wall of the bamboo through a mucilaginous strand. Inside the bamboo, these eggs will undergo direct development without water.

== Development ==
The eggs of Raorchestes chalazodes are spherical and transparent and are connected to the inner walls of the bamboo internode through a mucilaginous strand. The eggs have a creamy white yolk where the ratio of egg yolk to outer jelly is rather small. After hatching, the froglets will remain inside the internode where they will vacate the oviposition site between 3 and 34 days after the first froglet emerging.
