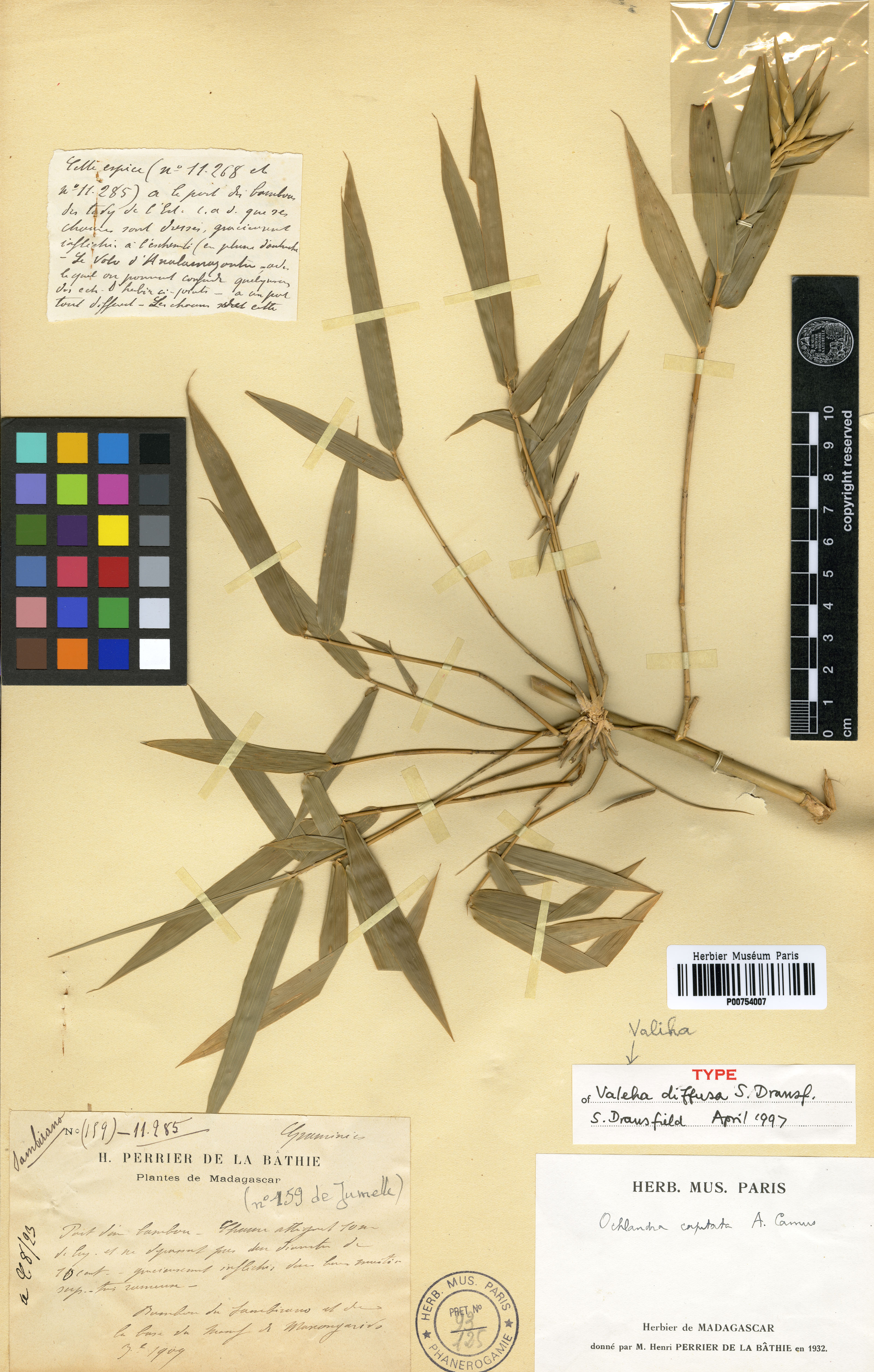
- Type specimen of Valiha diffusa at the MNHN, Paris

Scientific classification
- Kingdom: Plantae
- Clade: Tracheophytes
- Clade: Angiosperms
- Clade: Monocots
- Clade: Commelinids
- Order: Poales
- Family: Poaceae
- Subfamily: Bambusoideae
- Tribe: Bambuseae
- Subtribe: Hickeliinae
- Genus: Valiha; S.Dransf.

Species
- Valiha diffusa S.Dransf.; Valiha perrieri (A.Camus) S.Dransf.

= Valiha (plant) =

Genus of grasses

Valiha is a bamboo genus in the tribe Bambuseae found in Madagascar. The genus is named after a musical instrument, the valiha, which was formerly constructed from the culms of this plant. It may have come from Proto-Austronesian *balija or *baliga referring to Dendrocalamus strictus used to make cutting blades and beaters due to its hard properties – the beater tool also called a belira or balila in many related Austronesian languages – later transferred to newly discovered Malagasy bamboos.

Two species are accepted:

- Valiha diffusa S.Dransf.
- Valiha perrieri (A.Camus) S.Dransf.
