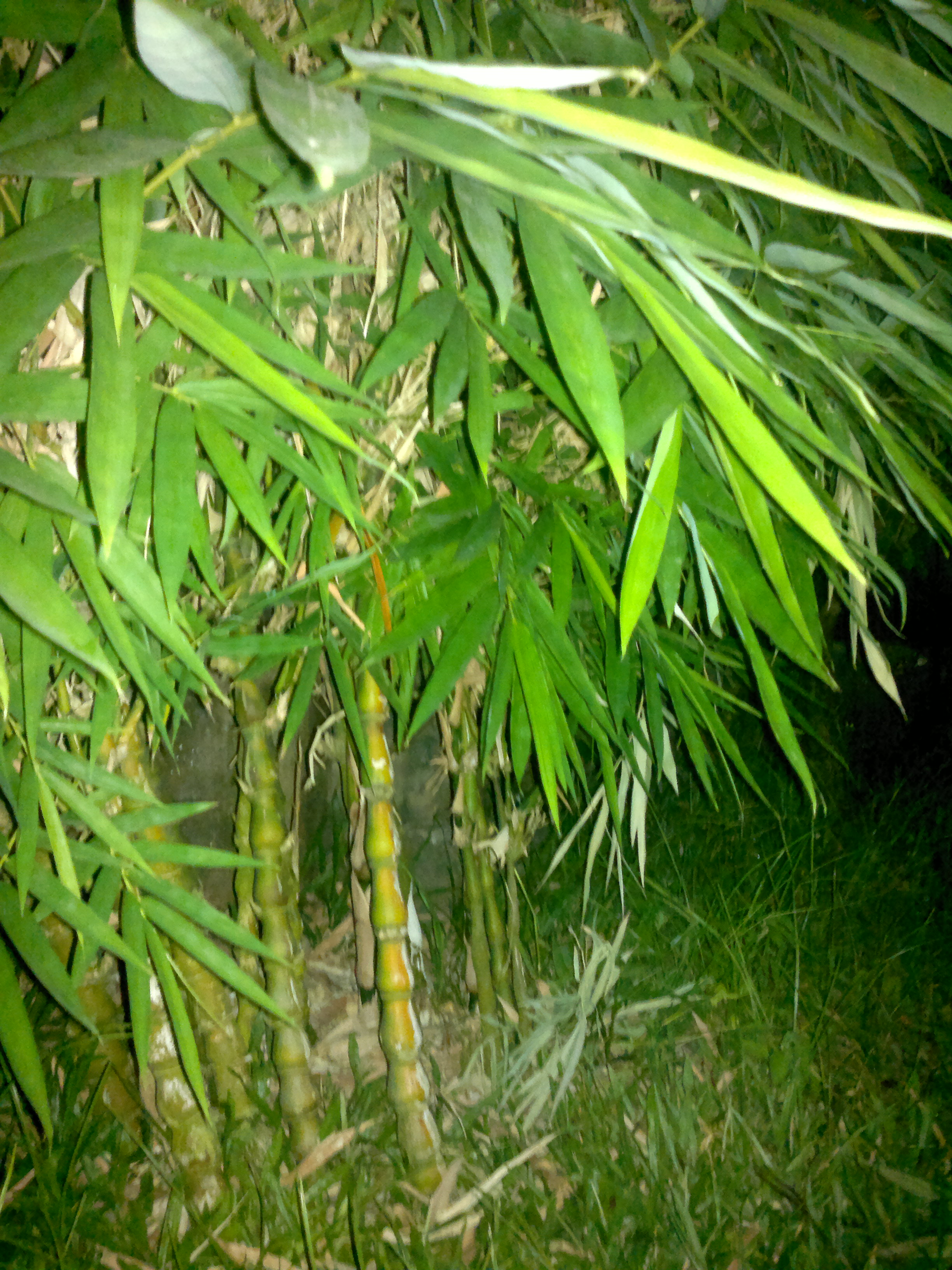
- Ochlandra scriptoria

Scientific classification
- Kingdom: Plantae
- Clade: Tracheophytes
- Clade: Angiosperms
- Clade: Monocots
- Clade: Commelinids
- Order: Poales
- Family: Poaceae
- Subfamily: Bambusoideae
- Tribe: Bambuseae
- Subtribe: Melocanninae
- Genus: Ochlandra; Thwaites

Type species
- Ochlandra stridula Moon ex Thwaites

Synonyms
- Besha D.Dietr.; Beesha Munro 1868, illegitimate homonym not Kunth 1822

= Ochlandra =

Genus of grasses

Ochlandra is a genus of Indian bamboo in the grass family). The flowers have up to 150 stamens in each flower.

The species are endemic to the Western Ghats (India), except for one species from Sri Lanka.

Species

- Ochlandra beddomei - Kerala
- Ochlandra ebracteata - India reed bamboo - Kerala
- Ochlandra keralensis - Kerala
- Ochlandra scriptoria - Tamil Nadu reed bamboo, Kerala reed bamboo - Karnataka, Tamil Nadu, Kerala
- Ochlandra setigera - Tamil Nadu, Kerala
- Ochlandra sivagiriana - Tamil Nadu, Kerala
- Ochlandra soderstromiana - Kerala
- Ochlandra spirostylis - Kerala
- Ochlandra stridula - Ceylon reed bamboo, Sri Lanka reed bamboo - Sri Lanka
- Ochlandra talbotii - Karnataka
- Ochlandra travancorica - elephant bamboo, India reed bamboo - Tamil Nadu, Kerala; also naturalised in the West Indies
- Ochlandra wightii - Karnataka, Kerala

Formerly included see Cathariostachys Nastus Schizostachyum Valiha

- Ochlandra capitata - Cathariostachys capitata
- Ochlandra elegantissima - Nastus elegantissimus
- Ochlandra perrieri - Valiha perrieri
- Ochlandra ridleyi - Schizostachyum latifolium
