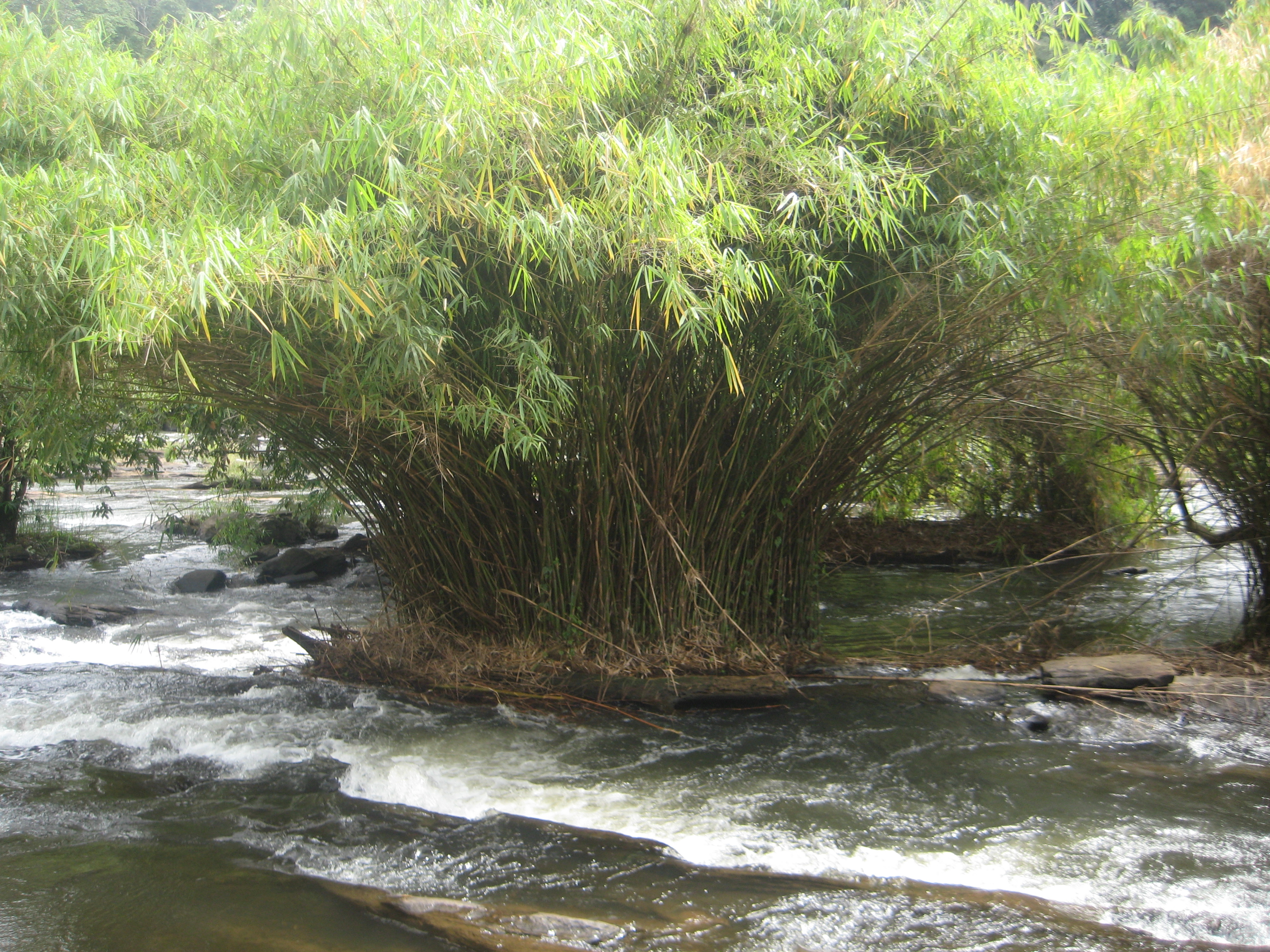

Scientific classification
- Kingdom: Plantae
- Clade: Tracheophytes
- Clade: Angiosperms
- Clade: Monocots
- Clade: Commelinids
- Order: Poales
- Family: Poaceae
- Genus: Ochlandra
- Species: O. travancorica

Binomial name
- Ochlandra travancorica (Bedd.) Benth. ex Gamble

= Ochlandra travancorica =

Species of grass

Ochlandra travancorica, or reed bamboo is a species of bamboo, endemic to the Western Ghats, India. It is naturalised in the West Indies. Clusters of this bamboo are known to be the spawning area for the critically endangered frog species Raorchestes chalazodes.
