= Odina =

Odina may refer to:

Surname

- Mercedes Odina (born 1959), Spanish journalist, author, and film director

Given name

- Odina Bayramova (born 1990), Azerbaijani volleyball player
- Odina Desrochers (born 1951), Canadian politician

Place

- Odina, Permsky District, Perm Krai, village in Russia
- Chernoyarskaya Odina, village in Russia

Biology

- Odina (genus), a genus of skipper butterfly
