= Satarupa (disambiguation) =

Shatarupa or Satarupa is the first woman in Hinduism, the wife and sister of Swayambhuva Manu, the first man, and the daughter of the creator deity Brahma.

Satarupa or Shatarupa may also refer to:

- Saraswati, the consort of Brahma

== People ==
- Shatarup Ghosh (born 1986), Indian politician
- Satarupa Pyne, Indian model and actress
- Satarupa Sanyal (born 1962), Indian film director, producer, author, poet

== Species ==
- Satarupa, genus of spread-winged skippers in the family Hesperiidae
  - Satarupa gopala
  - Satarupa nymphalis
