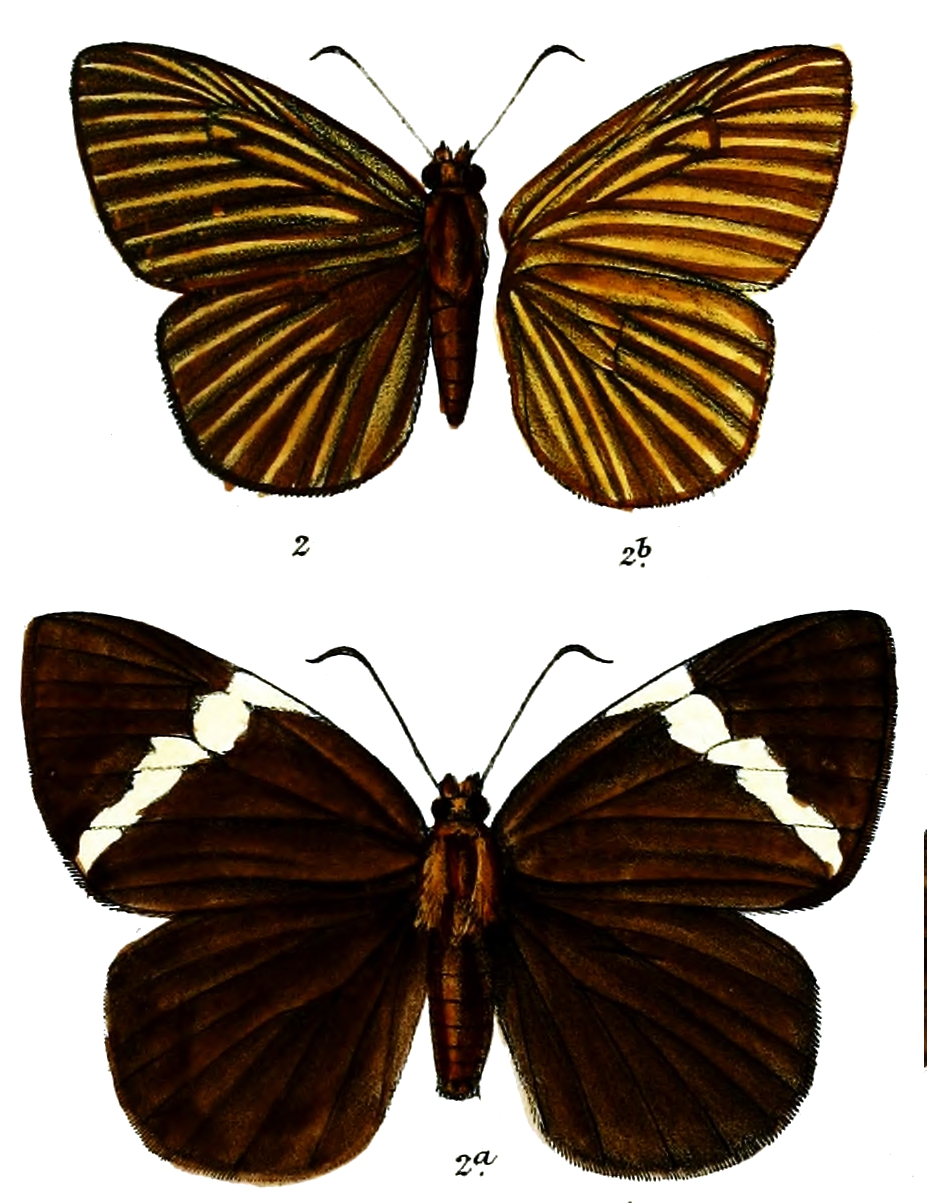
- Capila zennara in Lepidoptera Indica

Scientific classification
- Domain: Eukaryota
- Kingdom: Animalia
- Phylum: Arthropoda
- Class: Insecta
- Order: Lepidoptera
- Family: Hesperiidae
- Genus: Capila
- Species: C. zennara

Binomial name
- Capila zennara (Moore, 1865)

= Capila zennara =

Pale striped dawnfly

Species of butterfly

Capila zennara, commonly known as the pale striped dawnfly, is a species of hesperid butterfly found in tropical Asia.

== Range ==
The butterfly occurs in Sikkim, Bhutan, Northeast India, and has also been recorded in northern Thailand.

The type locality is Bengal.

== Description ==
In 1891, Edward Yerbury Watson gave a detailed description:

Male and female. Upperside brown; forewing with a broad yellowish white semitransparent irregular margined discal band obliquely from the middle of costa to posterior angle; hindwing in the male exteriorly with two greyish longitudinal streaks between each vein, these being absent in the female. Abdomen with a pale greyish anal tuft. Underside uniform brown, with oblique discal band as above. Front of head and palpi dull orange yellow. Body and legs brown. Cilia brown.

Watson also adds:

Mr. Elwes records this species as occurring rarely in Sikkim from April to August in the low valleys. Also, he states that the antennae of the female both in this species and in Capila jayadeva are much less hooked at the tip than those in the male.

— E. Y. Watson

== See also ==
- Pyrginae
- Hesperiidae
- List of butterflies of India (Pyrginae)
- List of butterflies of India (Hesperiidae)
