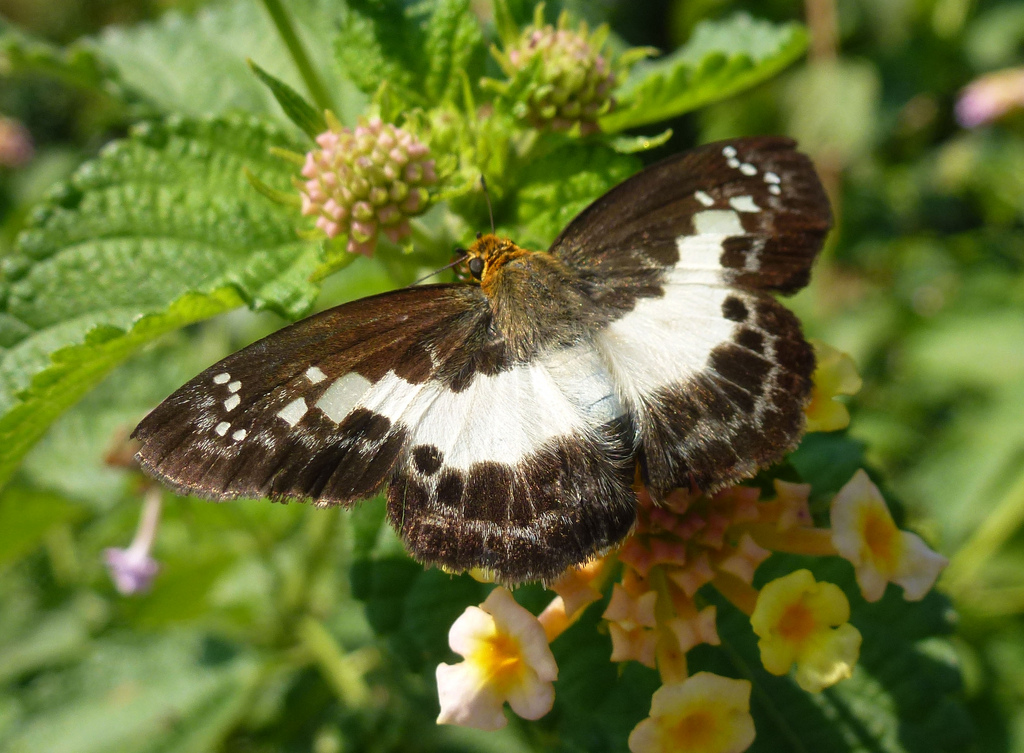

Scientific classification
- Kingdom: Animalia
- Phylum: Arthropoda
- Clade: Pancrustacea
- Class: Insecta
- Order: Lepidoptera
- Family: Hesperiidae
- Genus: Seseria
- Species: S. dohertyi

Binomial name
- Seseria dohertyi (Watson, 1893)

= Seseria dohertyi =

Species of butterfly

Seseria dohetyi, also known as the Himalayan white flat, is a butterfly in the family Hesperiidae. It is found from Uttarakhand in India to Hainan in China. It was described by Edward Yerbury Watson in 1893.

== Description ==
The upperside is dark brown, with the forewing having seven semi-transparent white spots. The upperside hindwing has a broad white band, usually bordered with dark black spots. The underside is as above, but it is paler and the white band is much larger. The abdomen is white above and greyish white below. It is best separated from the similar Seseria sambara by examining the male genitalia.

== Subspecies ==
There are three recognized subspecies -

- Seseria dohertyi dohertyi (Watson, 1893) - Northeast India
- Seseria dohertyi scona (Evans, 1949) - Yunnan
- Seseria dohertyi salex (Evans, 1949) - Hainan
