= Lidderdale =

Lidderdale may refer to:

== People ==
- Charles Sillem Lidderdale (1830-1895), British painter
- Kathleen Lidderdale (1894 - 1973), English hockey and tennis player
- William Lidderdale (1832–1902), governor of the Bank of England

== Places ==
- Lidderdale, Iowa, United States

== Biology ==
- Lidderdale's dawnfly (Capila lidderdali), a butterfly of India and Southeast Asia
