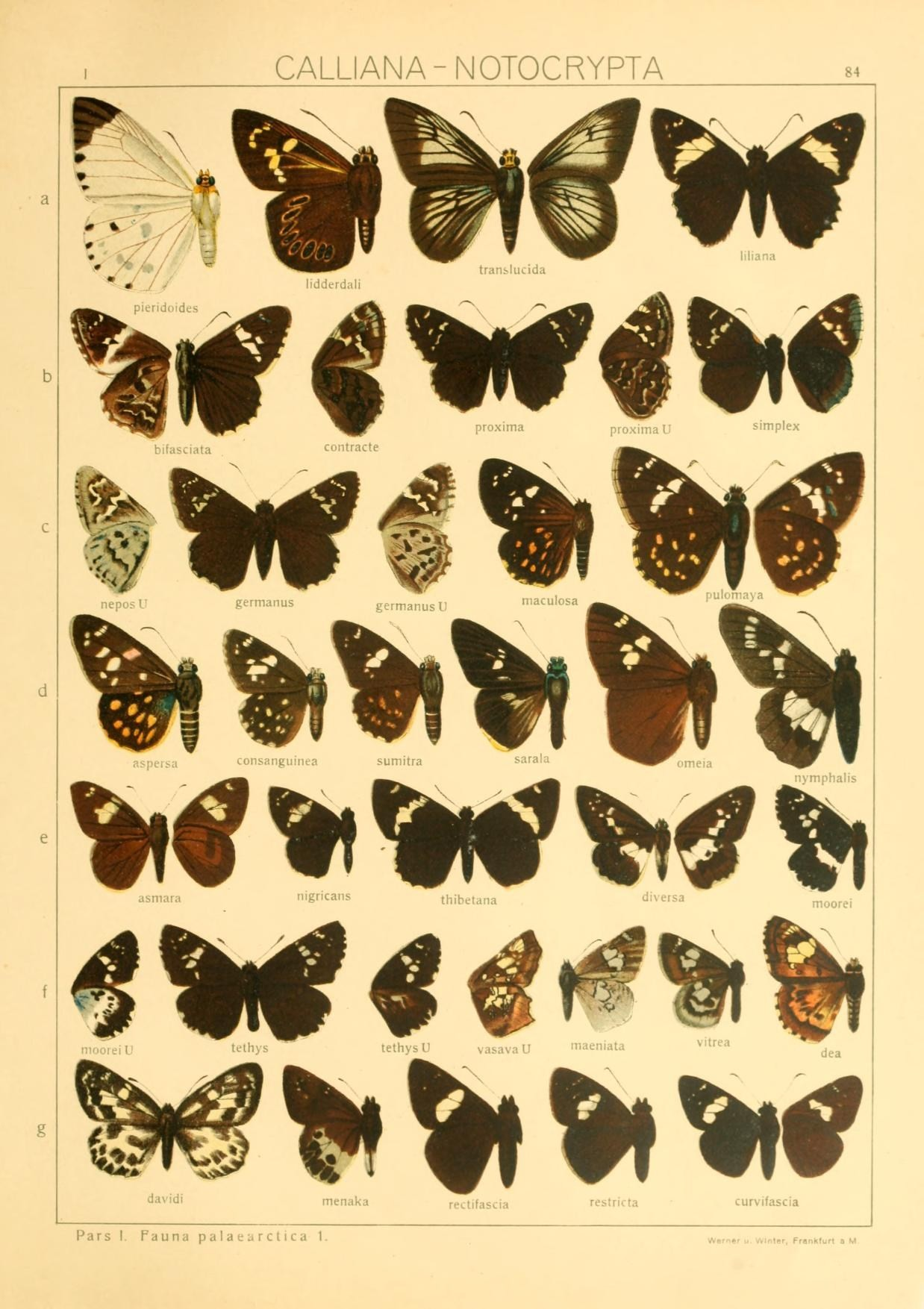
- Satarupa nymphalis in Seitz 84d

Scientific classification
- Kingdom: Animalia
- Phylum: Arthropoda
- Class: Insecta
- Order: Lepidoptera
- Family: Hesperiidae
- Genus: Satarupa
- Species: S. nymphalis

Binomial name
- Satarupa nymphalis (Speyer, 1879)

= Satarupa nymphalis =

Species of butterfly

Satarupa nymphalis is a small butterfly found in the East Palearctic (SouthChina, Korea, Ussuri) that belongs to the skippers family.

== Description from Seitz ==
S. nymphalis Spr. (84 d). This large species differs from the Indian gopala Moore in the white spot of the cell being reniform and extending right across the cell to its hind margin. Palpi yellow. Amurland and almost the whole of North and Central China.

== See also ==
- List of butterflies of Russia
