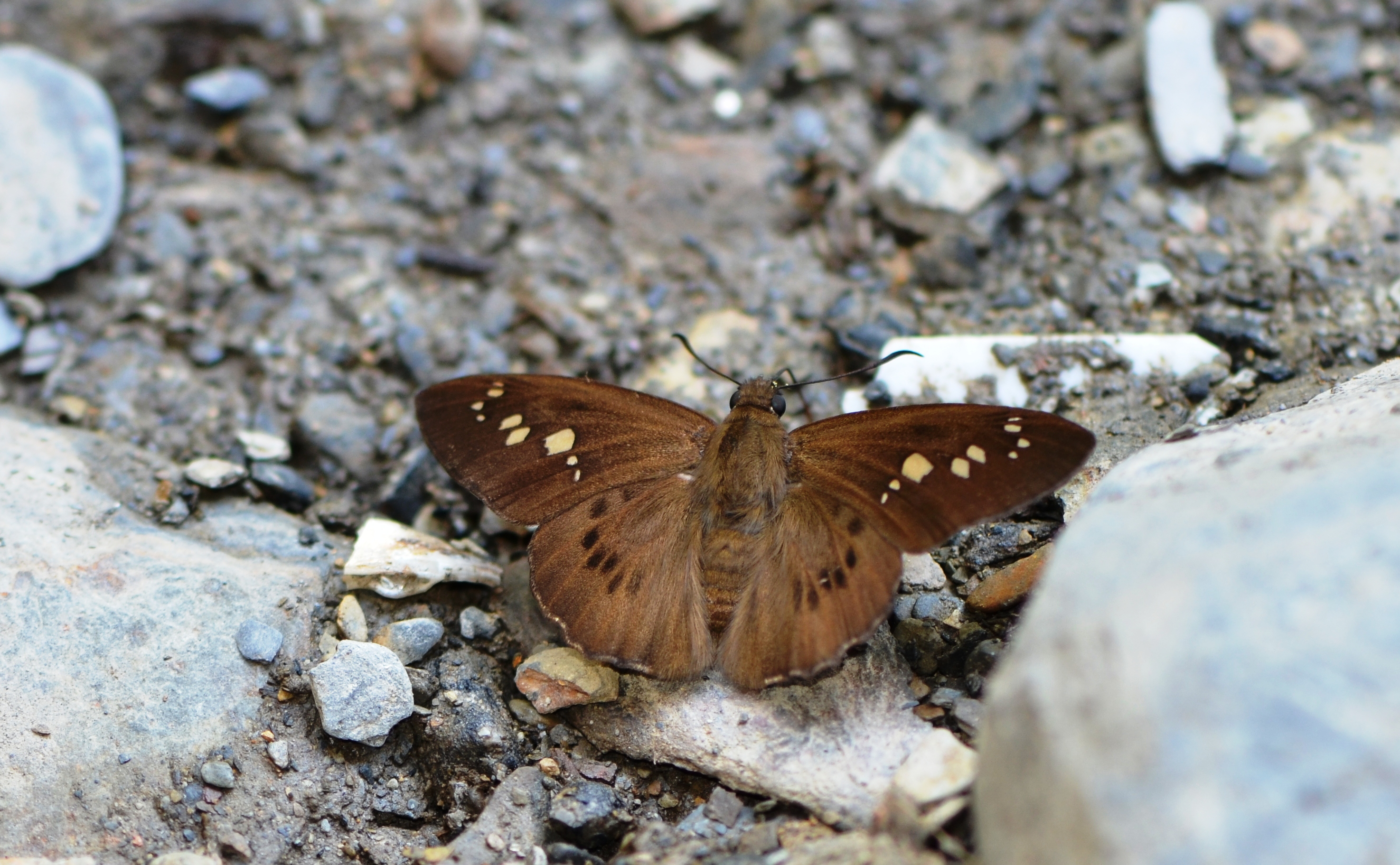

Scientific classification
- Kingdom: Animalia
- Phylum: Arthropoda
- Clade: Pancrustacea
- Class: Insecta
- Order: Lepidoptera
- Family: Hesperiidae
- Genus: Seseria
- Species: S. formosana

Binomial name
- Seseria formosana Fruhstorfer, 1909

= Seseria formosana =

Species of butterfly

Seseria formosana is a species of spread-winged skippers found throughout Taiwan.

== Description ==
Its wings have a brown base color with white spots on its forewings. Its hindwings lack spots.

== Ecology ==
Seseria formosana have been observed feeding on Lauraceae flowers.
