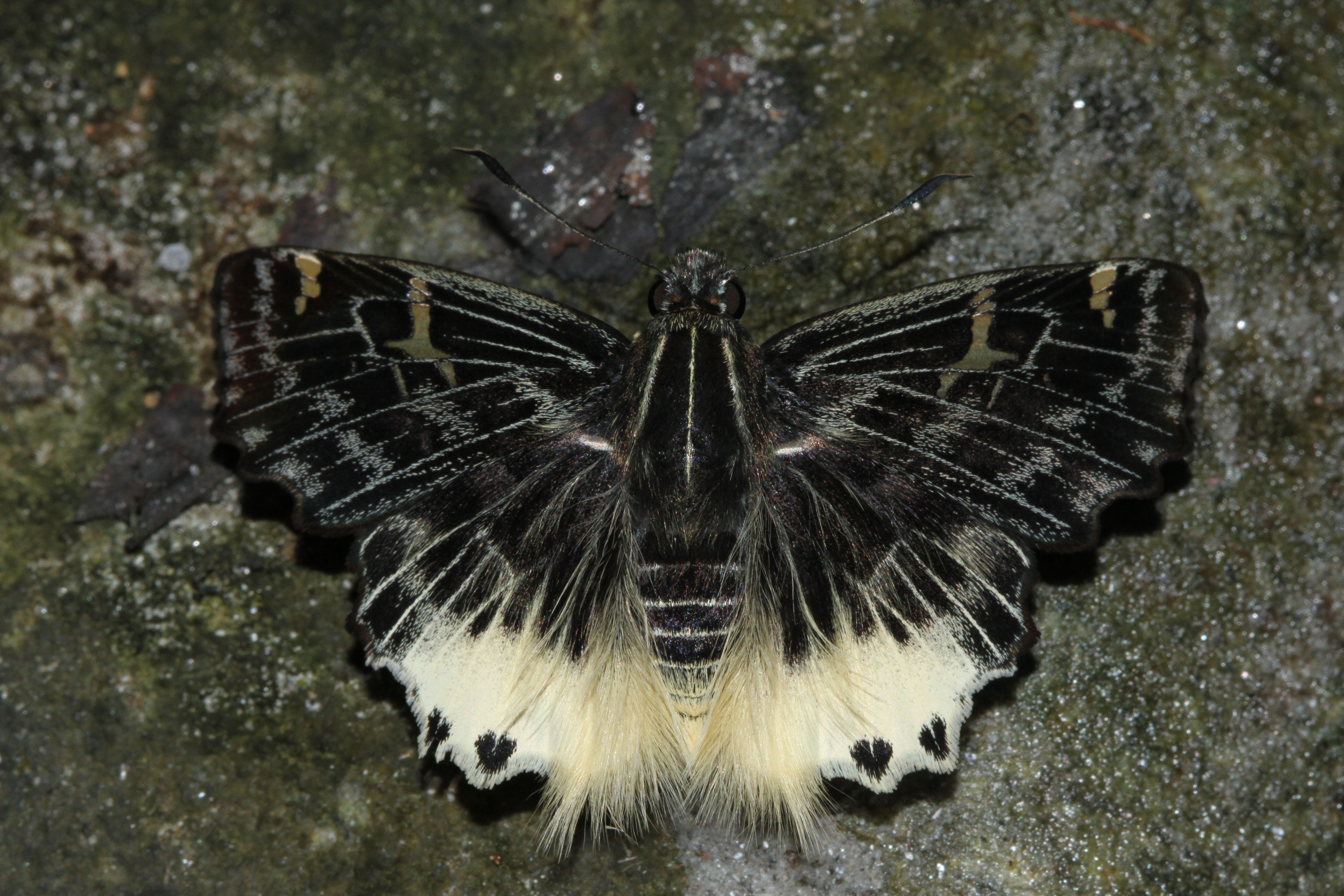

Scientific classification
- Domain: Eukaryota
- Kingdom: Animalia
- Phylum: Arthropoda
- Class: Insecta
- Order: Lepidoptera
- Family: Hesperiidae
- Genus: Darpa
- Species: D. hanria

Binomial name
- Darpa hanria Moore, 1866

= Darpa hanria =

Species of butterfly

Darpa hanria is a species of skipper butterfly found in Nepal, northern parts of Laos and Thailand and in the Indian states of Sikkim and Assam. It was first described by Frederic Moore in 1866.
