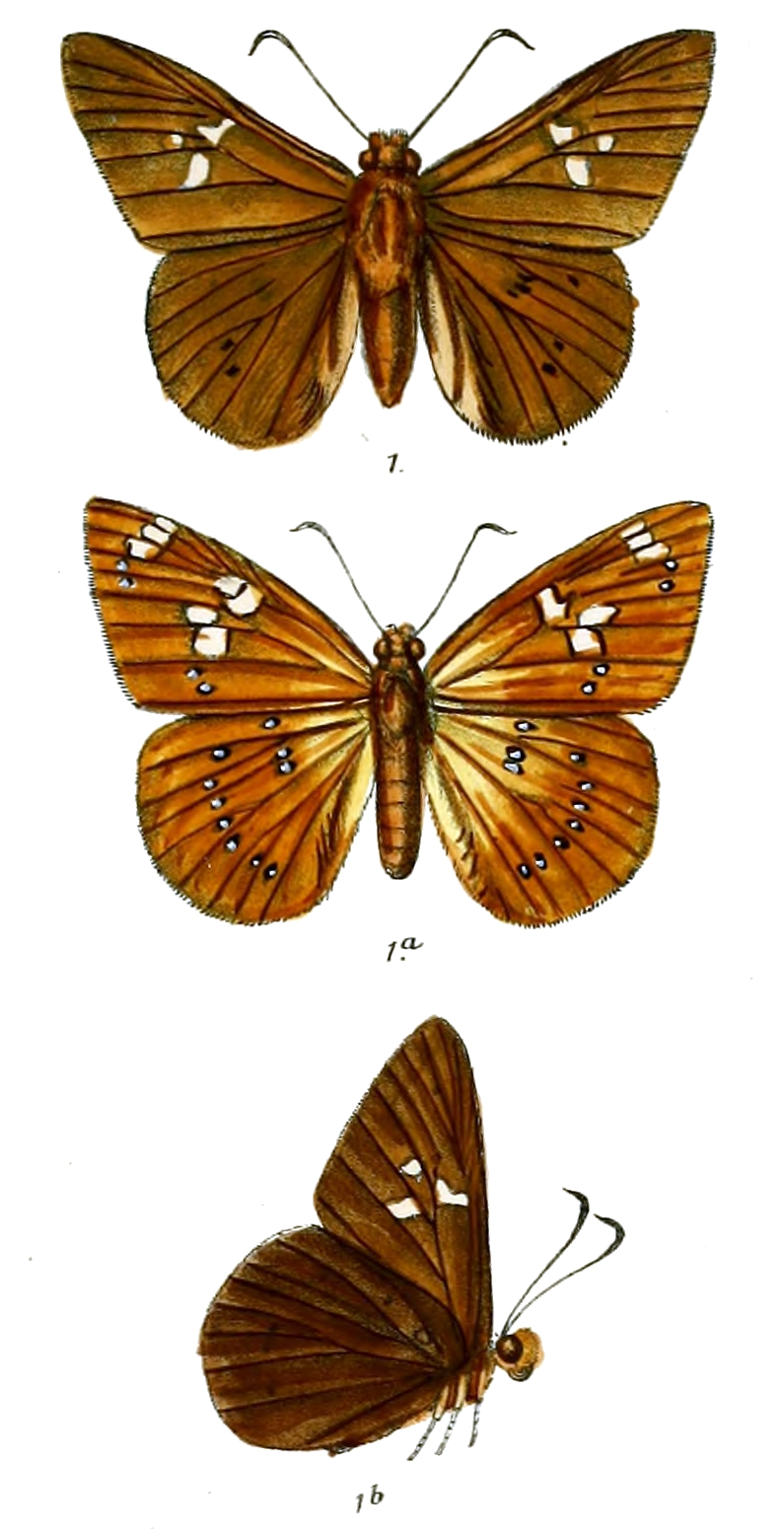
- Capila phanaeus lalita

Scientific classification
- Kingdom: Animalia
- Phylum: Arthropoda
- Class: Insecta
- Order: Lepidoptera
- Family: Hesperiidae
- Genus: Capila
- Species: C. phanaeus

Binomial name
- Capila phanaeus (Hewitson, 1867)

= Capila phanaeus =

Fulvous dawnfly

Species of butterfly

Capila phanaeus, commonly known as the fulvous dawnfly, is a species of hesperid butterfly found in India and Southeast Asia.

== Range ==
The butterfly occurs in India in the northeast, namely, in Meghalaya (Khasi Hills), Manipur and Mizoram (Lushai Hills) onto Myanmar (Maymyo, Karen Hills and Tavoy). It is also found in Indo-China in the countries of Thailand, southern Vietnam and Laos, in the Malay Peninsula as well as in Sumatra and Borneo.

The type locality is Sarawak, Malaysia.

== Status ==
This butterfly is considered rare.

== See also ==
- Pyrginae
- Hesperiidae
- List of butterflies of India (Pyrginae)
- List of butterflies of India (Hesperiidae)
