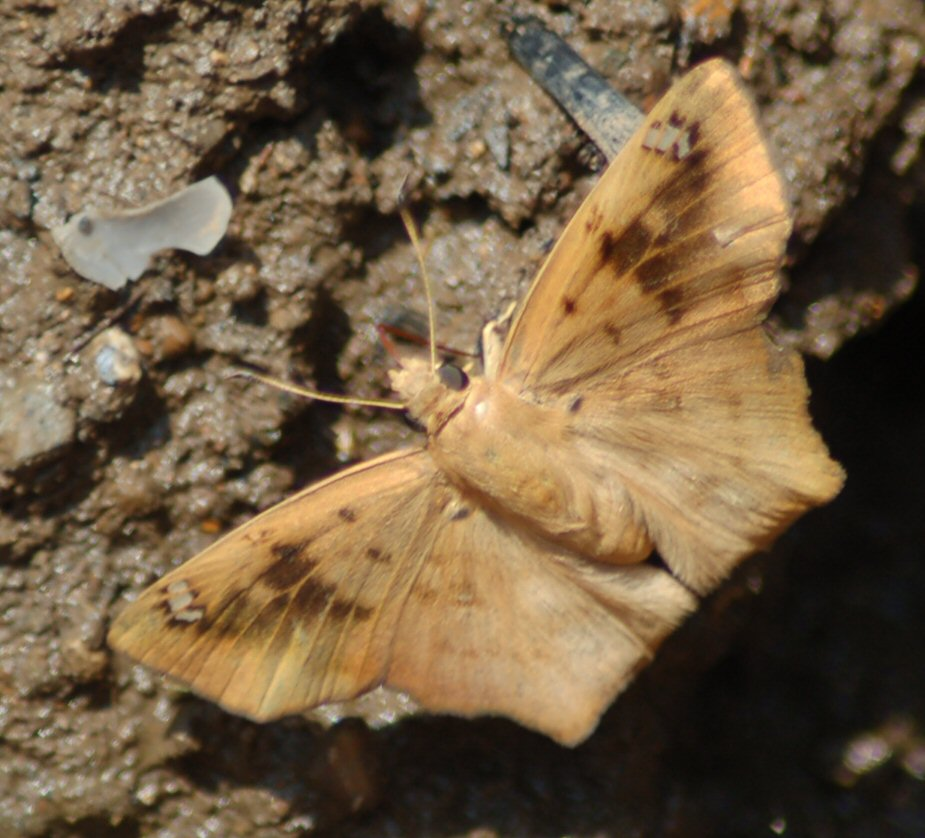
- Tapena thwaitesi

Scientific classification
- Kingdom: Animalia
- Phylum: Arthropoda
- Class: Insecta
- Order: Lepidoptera
- Family: Hesperiidae
- Tribe: Tagiadini
- Genus: Tapena; Moore, 1881

= Tapena =

Genus of butterflies

Tapena is a genus of butterflies in the family Hesperiidae subfamily Pyrginae.

== Species ==
Recognised species in the genus Tapena include:

- Tapena bornea Evans, 1941 - Malaysia
- Tapena minuscula Elwes and Edwards, 1897 - Myanmar
- Tapena multiguttata de Nicéville, 1890 - Myanmar, Thailand
- Tapena thwaitesi (Moore, 1881) - Indo-China, Indonesia
- Tapena vasava (Moore, [1866]) - northern India, Sikkim, Myanmar, Thailand, Laos, Vietnam and western China
