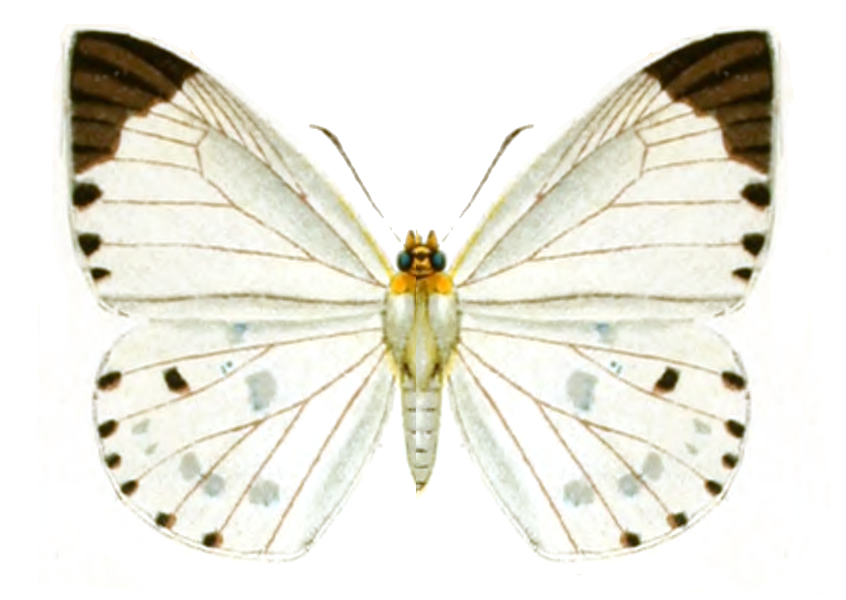

Scientific classification
- Domain: Eukaryota
- Kingdom: Animalia
- Phylum: Arthropoda
- Class: Insecta
- Order: Lepidoptera
- Family: Hesperiidae
- Genus: Capila
- Species: C. pieridoides

Binomial name
- Capila pieridoides (Moore, 1878)

Synonyms
- Calliana pieridoides Moore, 1878

= Capila pieridoides =

White dawnfly

Species of butterfly

Capila pieridoides, commonly known as the white dawnfly, is a species of hesperid butterfly found in India and Southeast Asia.

== Range ==
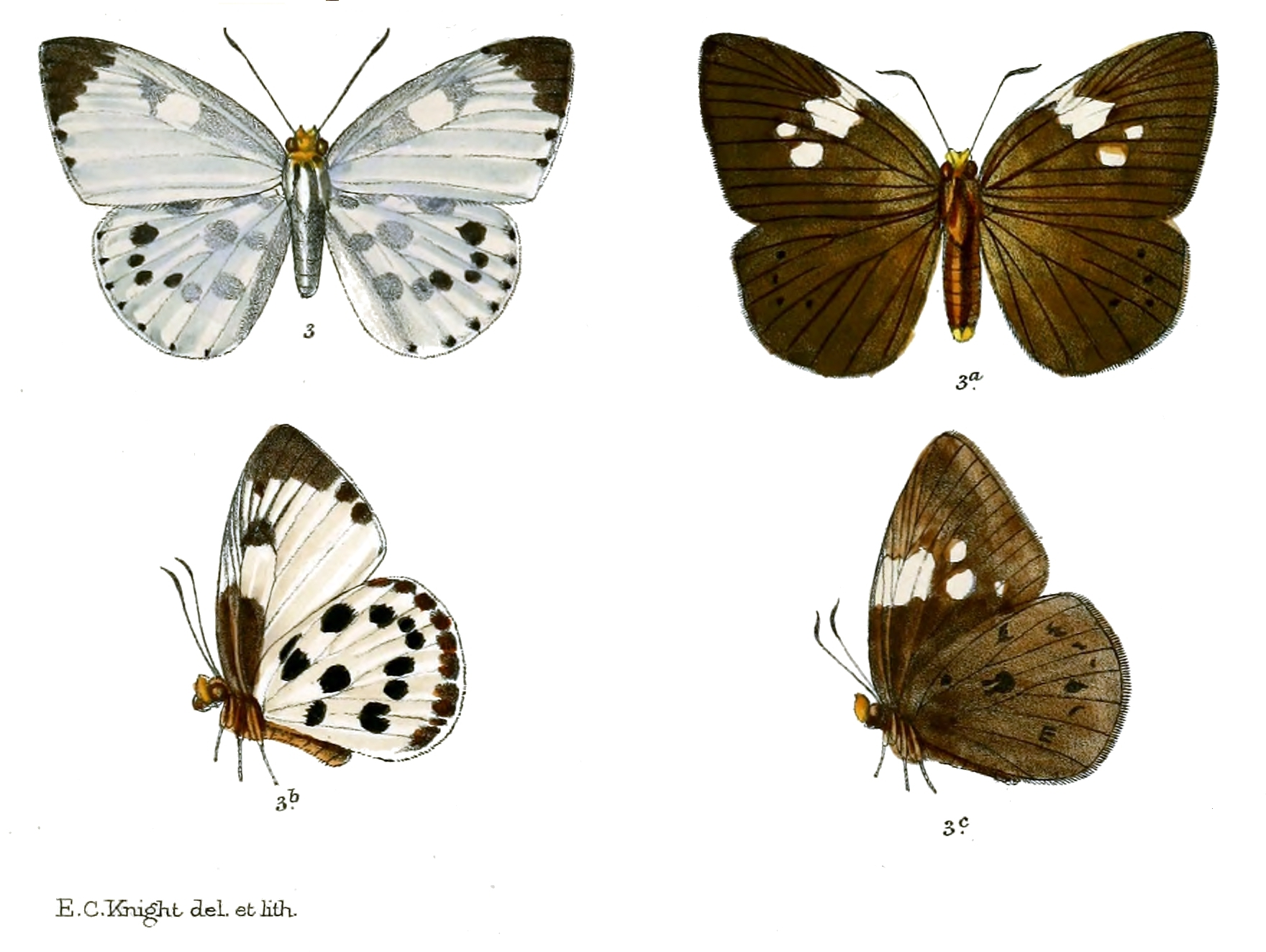
Male (left) and female (right)

The butterfly occurs in India in north-east Bengal and Assam and eastwards onto Myanmar (Dawnas). It is also found in Thailand and western China.

The type locality is northeast Bengal.

== Status ==
It is considered rare.

== See also ==
- Pyrginae
- Hesperiidae
- List of butterflies of India (Pyrginae)
- List of butterflies of India (Hesperiidae)
