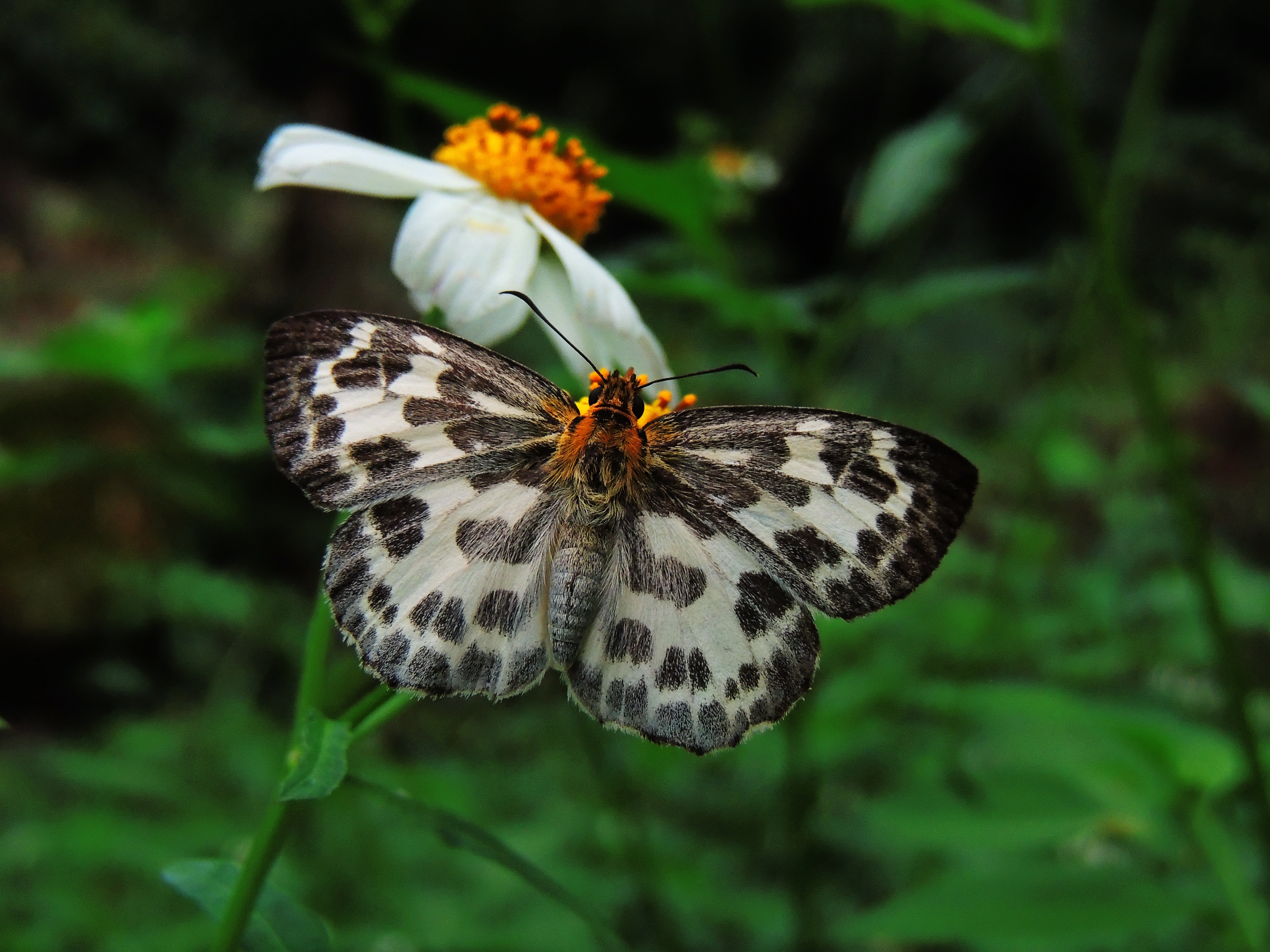
- Abraximorpha davidii

Scientific classification
- Kingdom: Animalia
- Phylum: Arthropoda
- Class: Insecta
- Order: Lepidoptera
- Family: Hesperiidae
- Tribe: Tagiadini
- Genus: Abraximorpha; Elwes & Edwards, 1897

= Abraximorpha =

Genus of skipper butterflies in tribe Tagiadini

Abraximorpha is a small South Asian genus of skippers in the family Hesperiidae.

== Species ==
The following species are recognised in the genus Abraximorpha:

- Abraximorpha davidii (Mabille, 1876)
  - A. d. davidii - China (Sichuan, Shaanxi, Hubei, Zhejiang, Jiangxi, Anhui)
  - A. d. ermasis (Fruhstorfer, 1914) - Taiwan
  - A. d. elfina Evans, 1949 - Vietnam
- Abraximorpha esta Evans, 1949 - Yunnan, Burma, Vietnam, Laos

=== Former species ===
- Abraximorpha heringi Liu & Gu, 1994 - transferred to Albiphasma heringi (Liu & Gu, 1994)
- Abraximorpha pieridoides Mell, 1922 - transferred to Albiphasma pieridoides (Mell, 1922)
