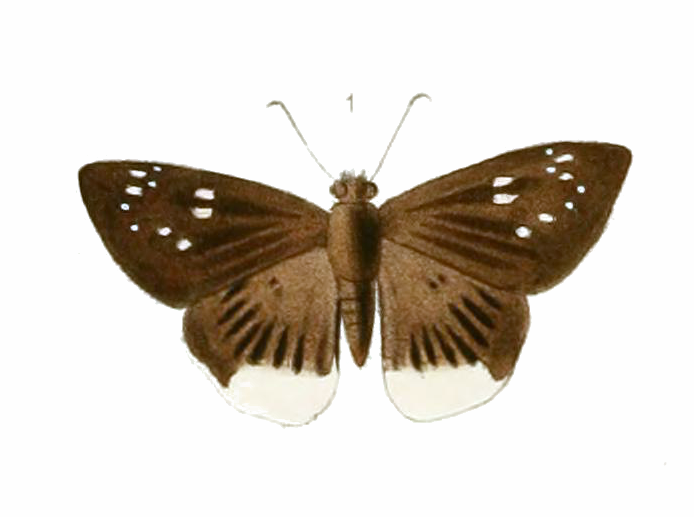

Scientific classification
- Kingdom: Animalia
- Phylum: Arthropoda
- Class: Insecta
- Order: Lepidoptera
- Family: Hesperiidae
- Genus: Darpa
- Species: D. pteria

Binomial name
- Darpa pteria (Hewitson, 1868)

Synonyms
- Pterygospidea pteria Hewitson, 1868

= Darpa pteria =

Snowy angle

Species of butterfly

Darpa pteria, the snowy angle, is a species of skipper butterfly found in Southeast Asia and parts of South Asia. It is found from Malaya to the Philippines where it is found mainly in the lowlands. The adult is fast flying and territorial, seeking sunny patches inside forest clearings.

A former subspecies of the snowy angle, Darpa dealbata, has a similar appearance but with an extended area of white in the tornal area of the hind wing.

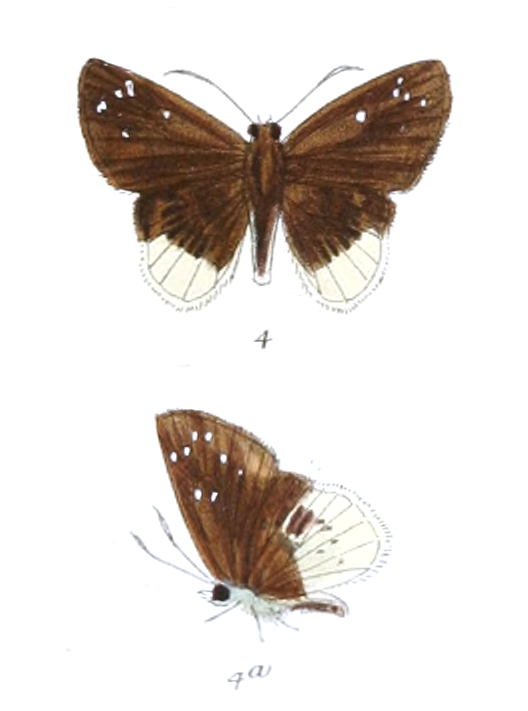
Male upper and underside
