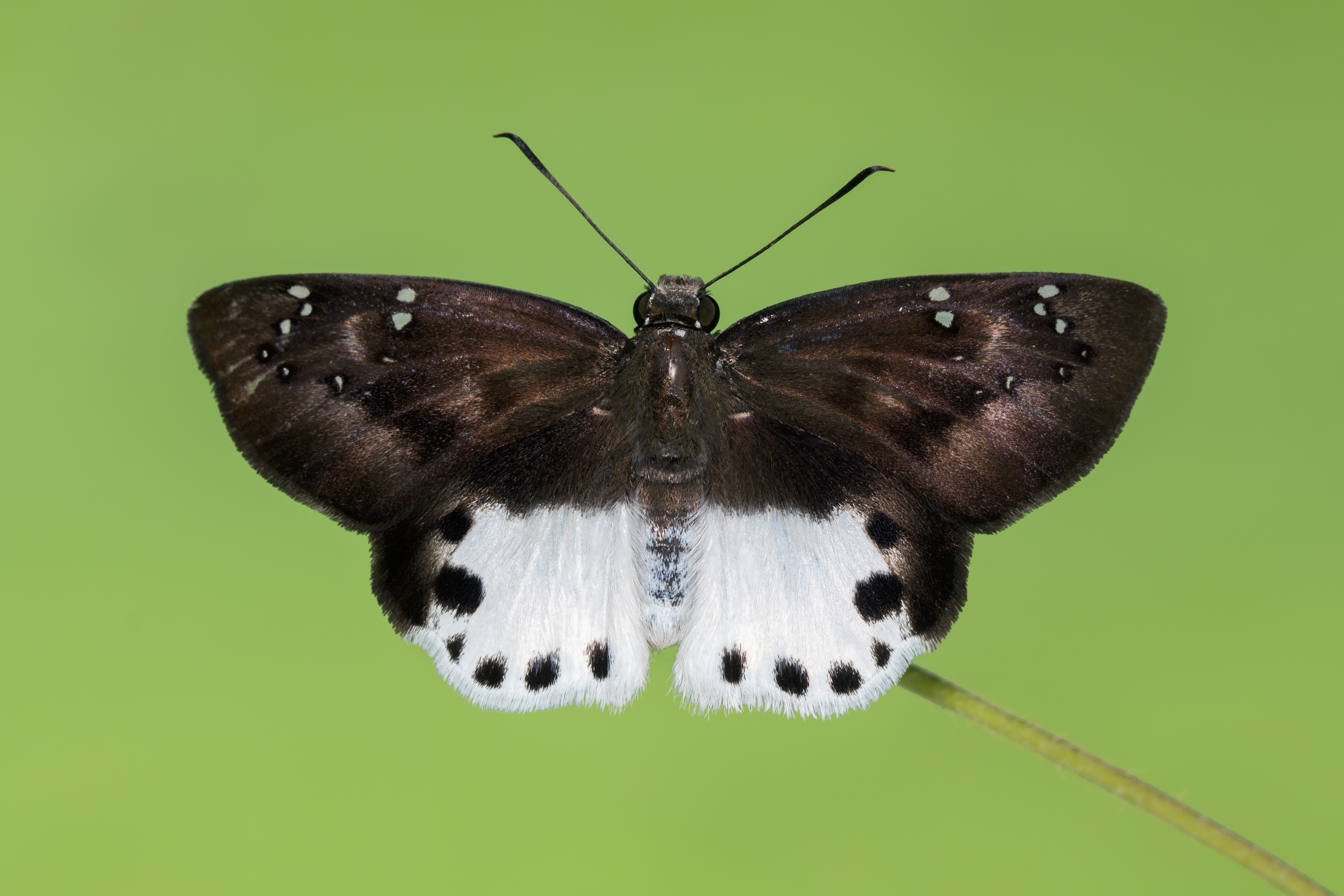
- Tagiades litigiosa

Scientific classification
- Kingdom: Animalia
- Phylum: Arthropoda
- Class: Insecta
- Order: Lepidoptera
- Family: Hesperiidae
- Subfamily: Tagiadinae
- Tribe: Tagiadini; Mabille, 1878

= Tagiadini =

Tribe of butterflies

The Tagiadini are a tribe of skipper butterflies in the family Hesperiidae. Many of its genera were of uncertain relationships for long, and delimitation of the Tagiadini versus the Celaenorrhinini was quite disputed at times. The species of this tribe are found in mostly tropical regions of Africa, Asia and Australia.

== Genera ==
Altogether, the tribe contains 27 genera. Some of these seem to form a close-knit group around the tribe's type genus Tagiades. These genera are often collectively called "Tagiades group" and may form a clade:

"Tagiades group"

- Abantis – paradise skippers
- Abaratha
- Ctenoptilum
- Leucochitonea
- Netrobalane – buff-tipped skipper
- Semperium
- Tagiades – water flats, snow flats

Other genera

- Abraximorpha
- Albiphasma
- Calleagris – scarce flats
- Capila (formerly often placed in Celaenorrhinini)
- Coladenia
- Daimio
- Darpa
- Eagris – "flats"
- Gerosis
- Mooreana
- Odina
- Pintara
- Procampta – rare elf
- Satarupa
- Seseria
- Tapena
- Triskelionia
