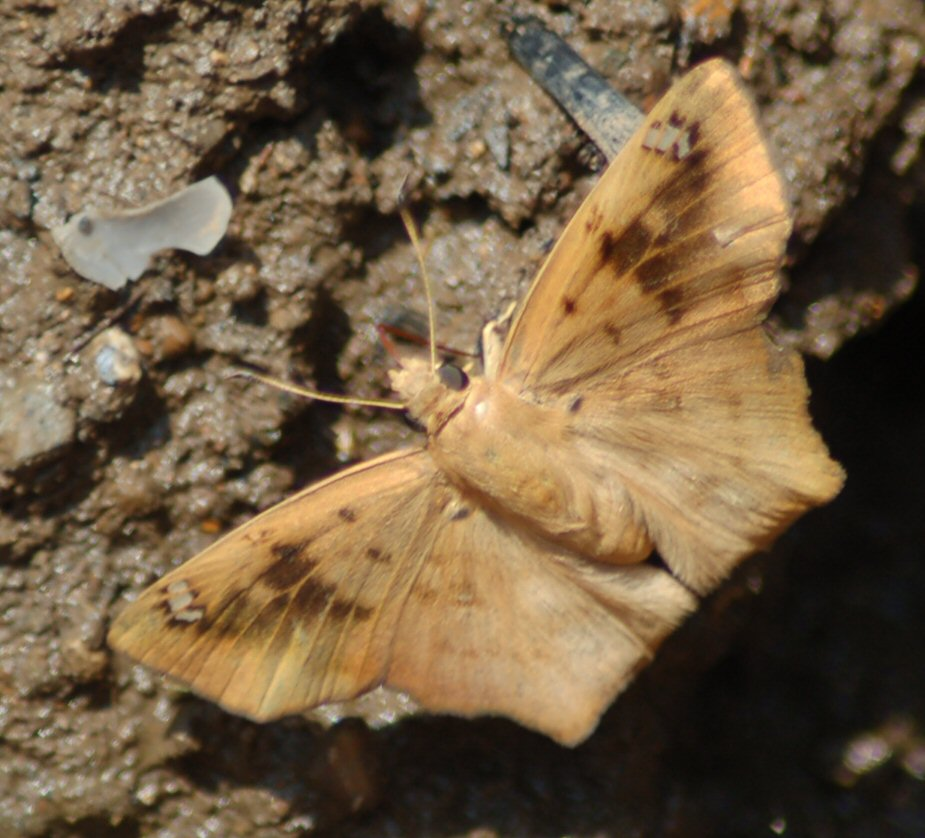

Scientific classification
- Kingdom: Animalia
- Phylum: Arthropoda
- Class: Insecta
- Order: Lepidoptera
- Family: Hesperiidae
- Genus: Tapena
- Species: T. thwaitesi

Binomial name
- Tapena thwaitesi (Moore, 1881)

= Tapena thwaitesi =

Black angle

Species of butterfly

Tapena thwaitesi, the black angle, is a species of butterfly belonging to the family Hesperiidae found in Indomalayan realm. The species was described by Frederic Moore in 1881 and is named after G. H. K. Thwaites, the director of the botanical garden at Peradeniya, Sri Lanka between 1849 and 1880.

== Description ==
Male has the upperside dark purple brown, with blackish outer margins and indistinct discal transverse band of spots; forewing with two small translucent white spots on the costa near the apex. Underside dark purple brown.

Female has the upper and underside greyish purple brown, transverse band of spots and outer border dark purple brown; forewing with three small semi-diaphanous white subapical spots, the lowest transversely narrow, two spots also at end of the cell, the upper one very slender, and two spots on the disc, each series being bordered by the dark band; hindwing with a semi-diaphanous spot at end of the cell.

== Subspecies ==
Two subspecies are classified under Tapena thwaitesi, they are:

- T. t. bornea Evans, 1941 - southern Vietnam, Thailand, Langkawi, Malay Peninsula, Borneo, Sumatra, Palawan
- T. t. minuscula Elwes & Edwards, 1897 - Myanmar, Thailand, Laos

== Gallery ==
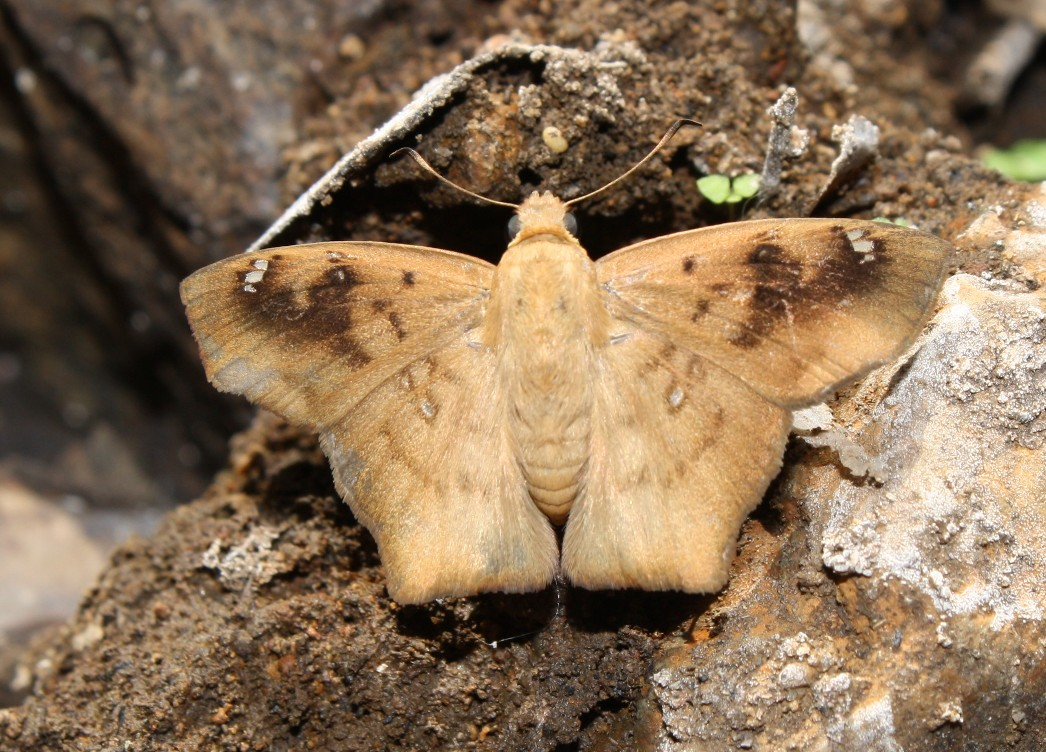
Dry-season form

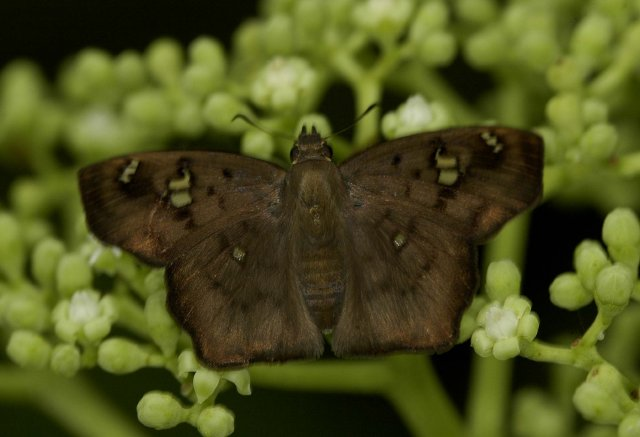
Wet-season form
