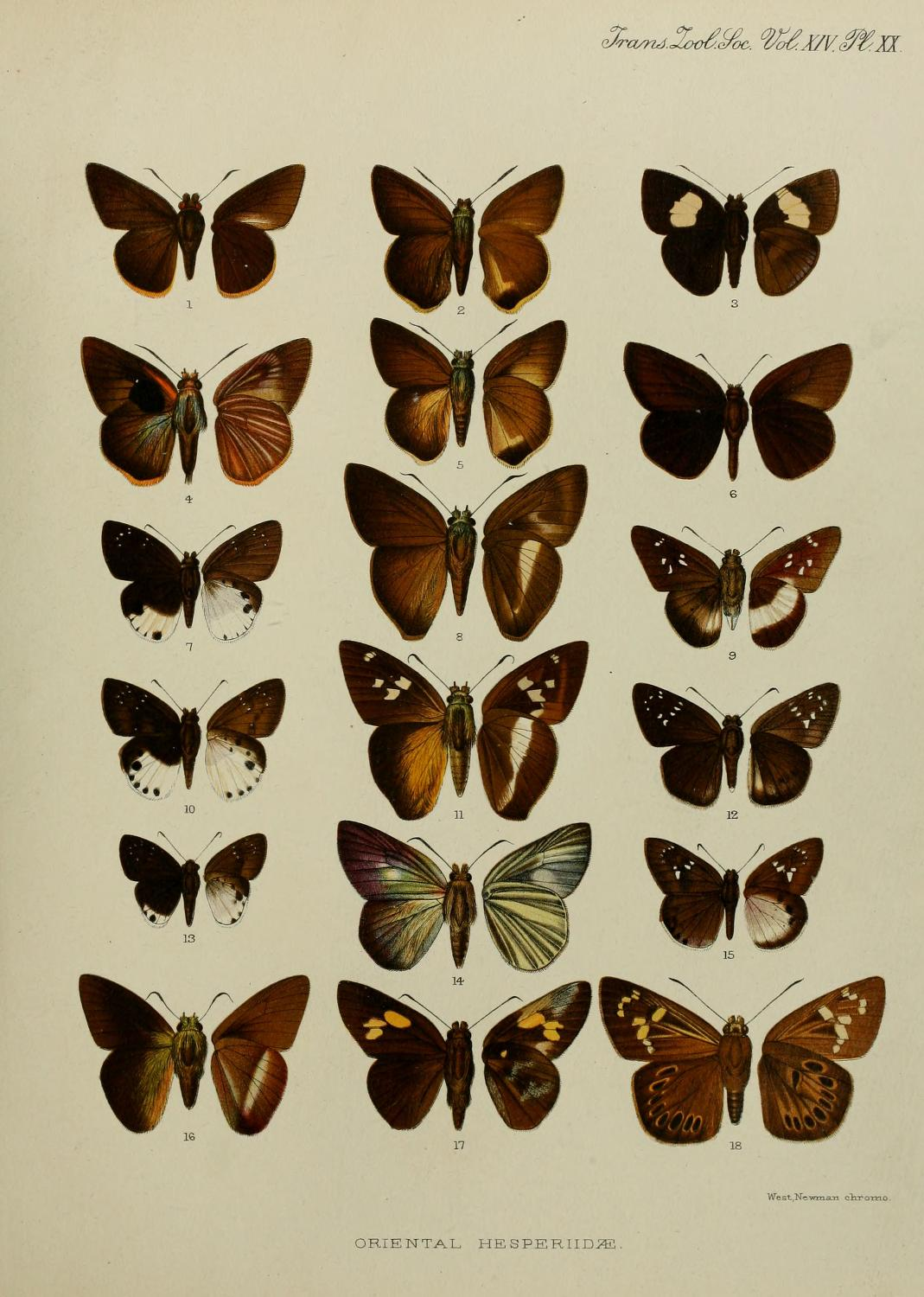
- Capila lidderdali (figure 18)

Scientific classification
- Kingdom: Animalia
- Phylum: Arthropoda
- Class: Insecta
- Order: Lepidoptera
- Family: Hesperiidae
- Tribe: Tagiadini
- Genus: Capila; Moore, 1866

= Capila =

Genus of butterflies

Capila is a genus of spread-winged skippers in the family Hesperiidae.

== Species ==
The following species are recognised in the genus Capila:

- Capila jayadeva Moore, 1865
- Capila lidderdali (Elwes, 1888)
- Capila penicillatum (de Nicéville, 1893)
- Capila phanaeus (Hewitson, 1867)
- Capila pieridoides (Moore, 1878)
- Capila zennara (Moore, 1865)
