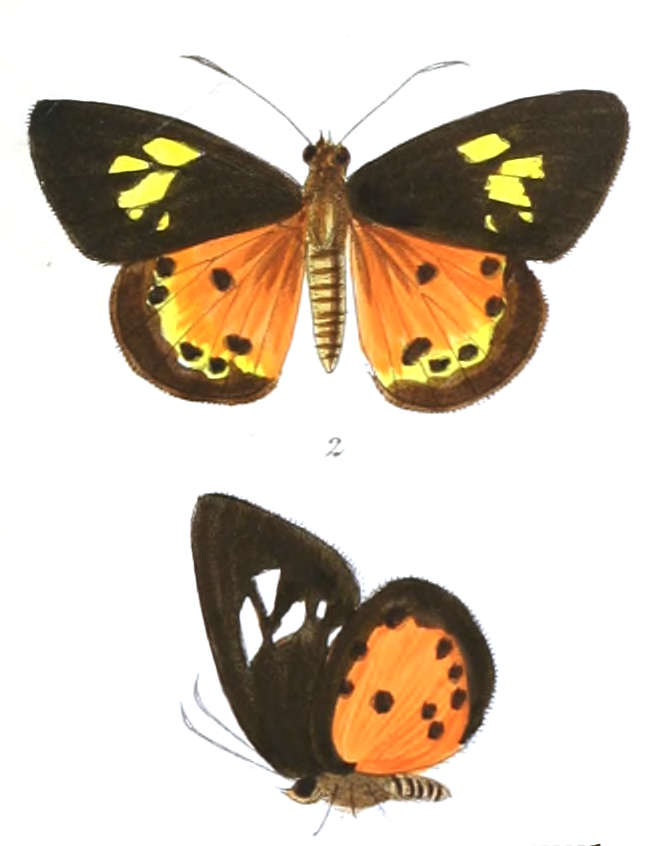
- Pintara pinwilli (male)

Scientific classification
- Kingdom: Animalia
- Phylum: Arthropoda
- Class: Insecta
- Order: Lepidoptera
- Family: Hesperiidae
- Tribe: Tagiadini
- Genus: Pintara; Evans, 1932

= Pintara =

Genus of butterflies

Pintara is an Indomalayan genus of spread-winged skippers in the family Hesperiidae.

== Species ==
- Pintara capiloides Devyatkin, 1998 - Vietnam
- Pintara bowringi Devyatkin, 1998 - Hainan, Vietnam
- Pintara tabrica (Hewitson, [1873]) - Southeast China, Vietnam
- Pintara pinwilli (Butler, [1879]) - Burma, Thailand, Vietnam, Malay Peninsula
- Pintara prasobsuki (Ek-Amnuay, 2006) - Laos
