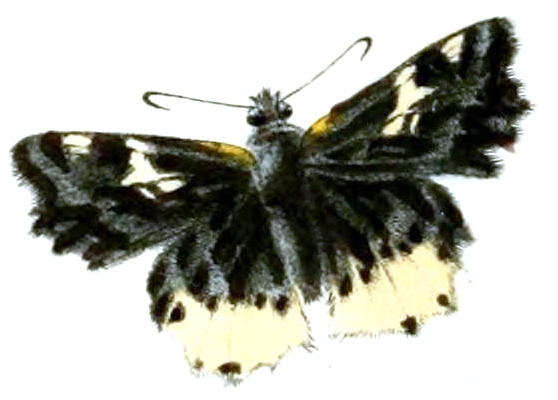
- Darpa hanria

Scientific classification
- Kingdom: Animalia
- Phylum: Arthropoda
- Class: Insecta
- Order: Lepidoptera
- Family: Hesperiidae
- Tribe: Tagiadini
- Genus: Darpa; Moore, 1866

= Darpa (butterfly) =

Genus of butterflies

Darpa is a genus of spread-wingedskippers in the family Hesperiidae. Their distribution is restricted to the Indomalayan realm.

== Species ==
Recognised species in the genus Darpa include:

- Darpa dealbata (Distant, 1886)
- Darpa hanria Moore, 1865
- Darpa pteria (Hewitson, 1868)
- Darpa striata Druce, 1873
- Darpa inopinata Devyatkin, 2001
