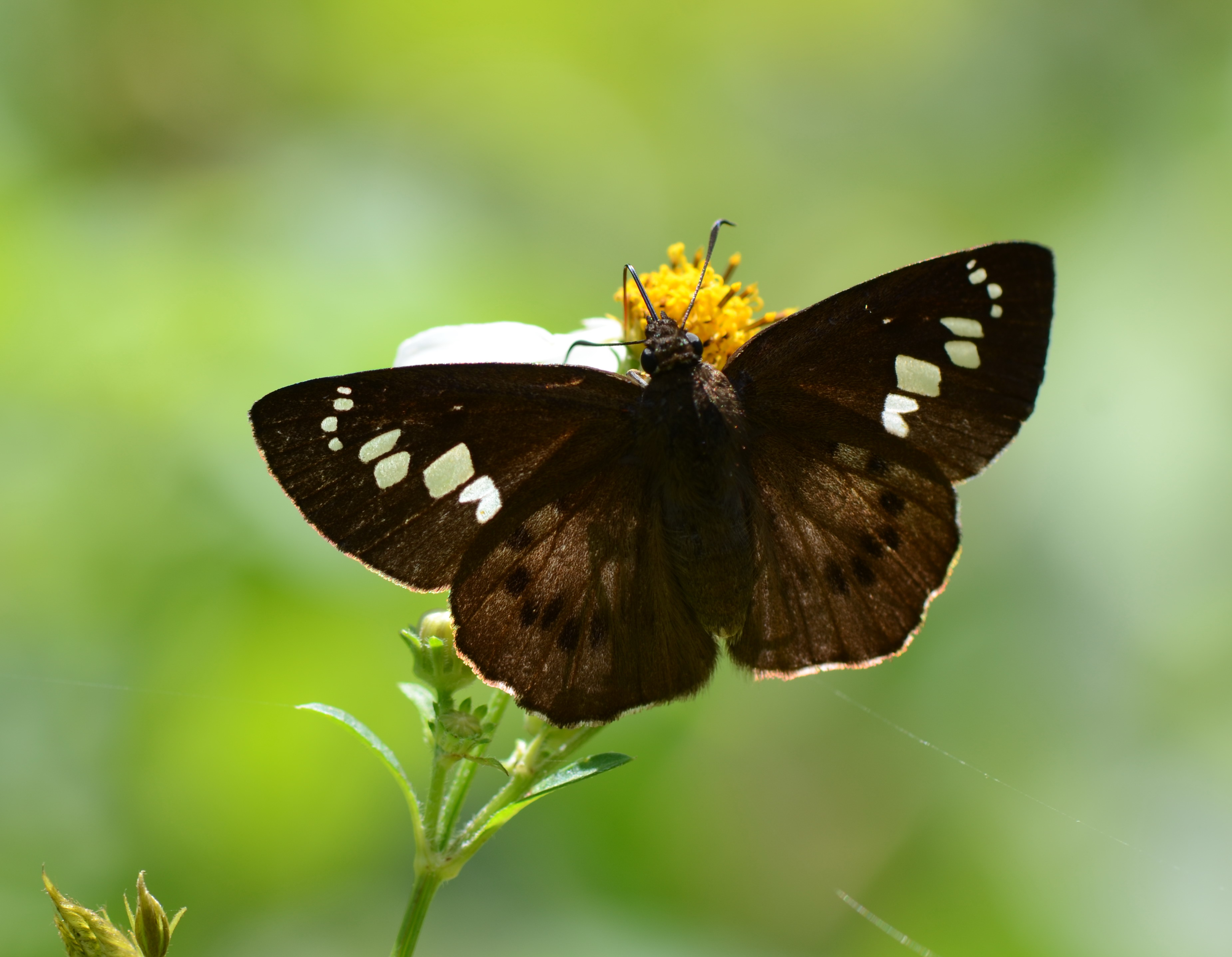
- Seseria formosana

Scientific classification
- Kingdom: Animalia
- Phylum: Arthropoda
- Clade: Pancrustacea
- Class: Insecta
- Order: Lepidoptera
- Family: Hesperiidae
- Tribe: Tagiadini
- Genus: Seseria; Matsumura, 1919

= Seseria =

Genus of butterflies

Seseria is an Indomalayan genus of spread-winged skippers in the family Hesperiidae.

== Species ==
- Seseria affinis (Druce, 1873) Sumatra, Malaya, Borneo, Java
- Seseria dohertyi Watson, 1893 Northwest Himalayas, Nepal, Sikkim, Assam, Hainan, Laos, Laos, Vietnam
- Seseria formosana (Fruhstorfer, 1909) Formosa
- Seseria sambara Moore, [1866] Assam to Indo-China Northwest India to Burma, Laos, Vietnam
- Seseria strigata Evans, 1926 Burma, Thailand, Laos
- Seseria sesame Evans, 1949 Borneo
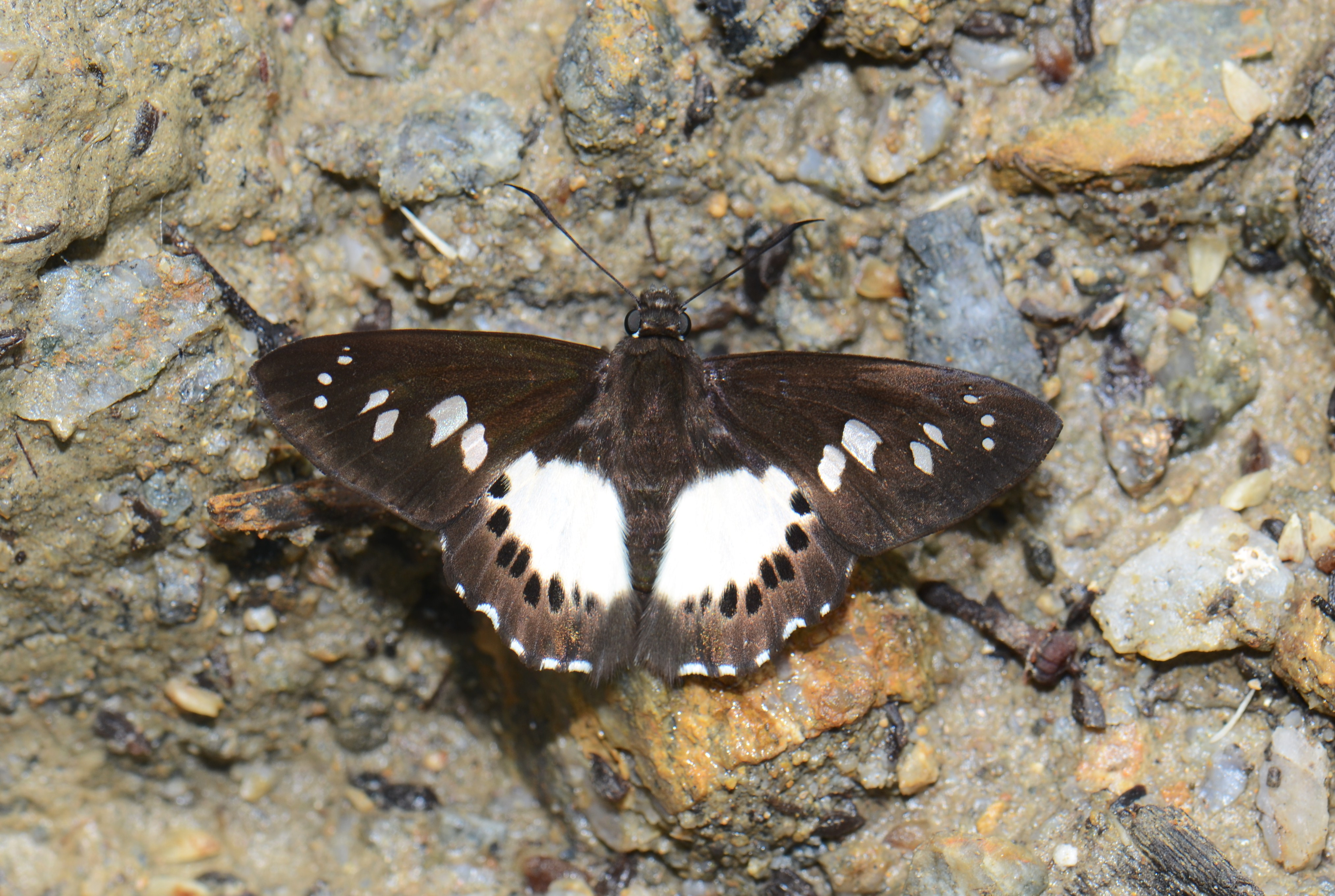
Seseria affinis

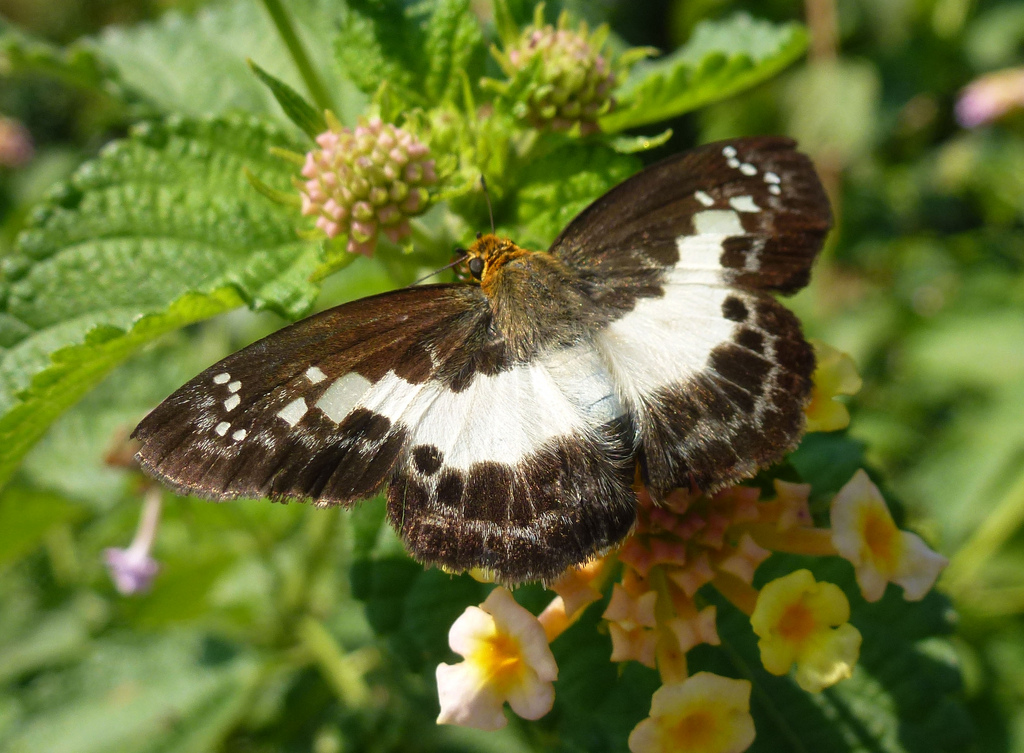
Seseria dohertyi

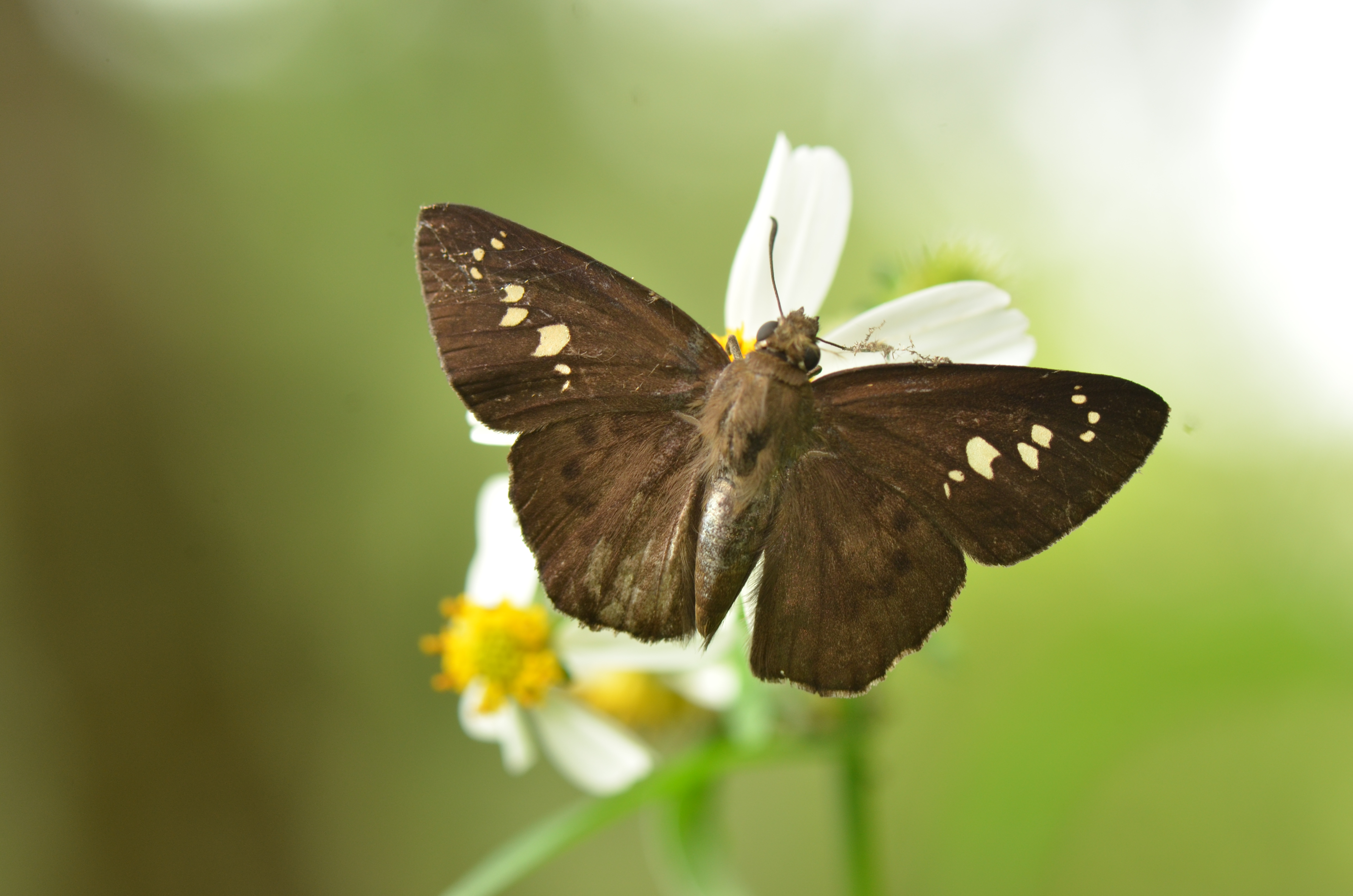
Seseria formosana

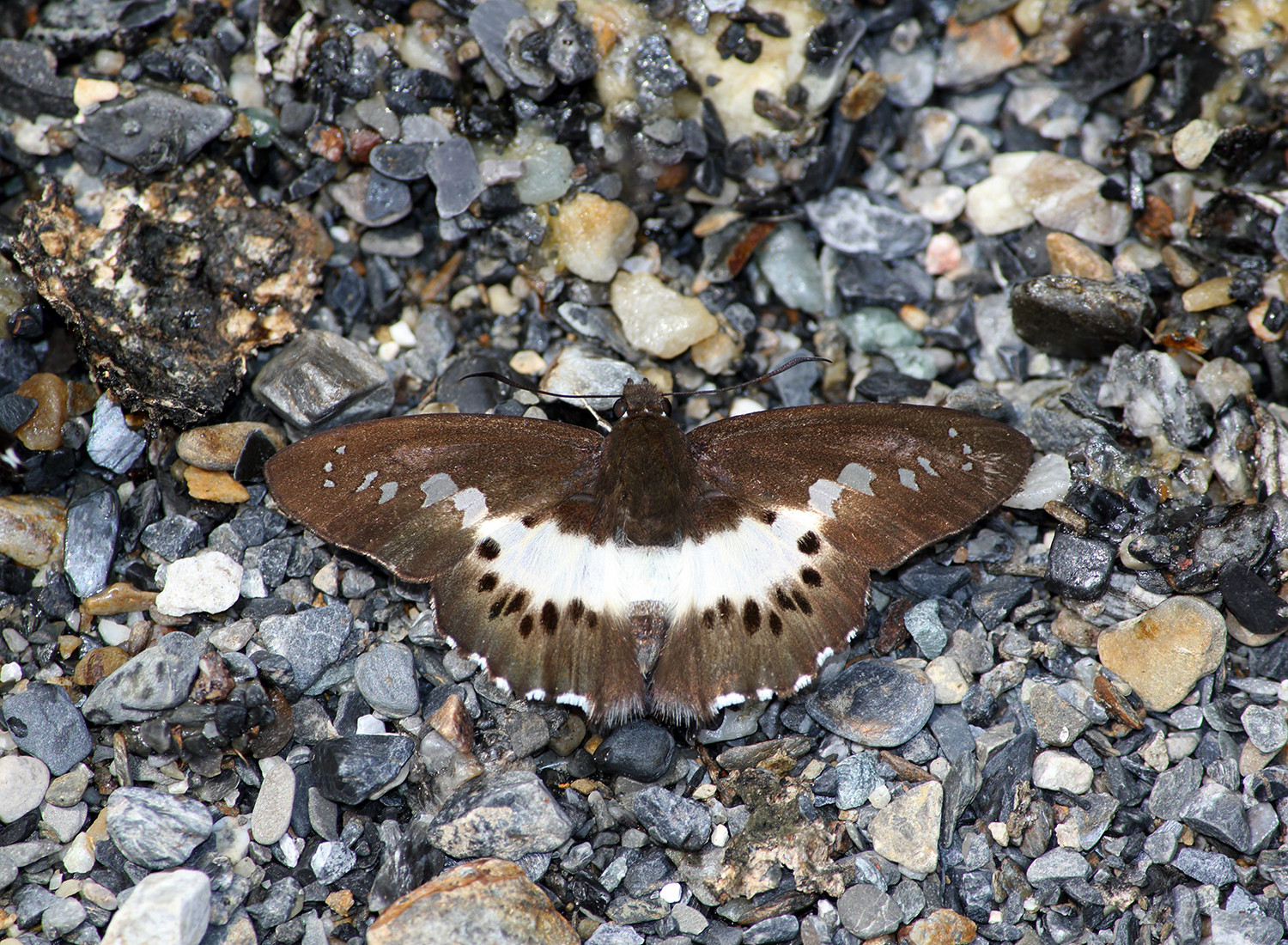
Seseria sambara
