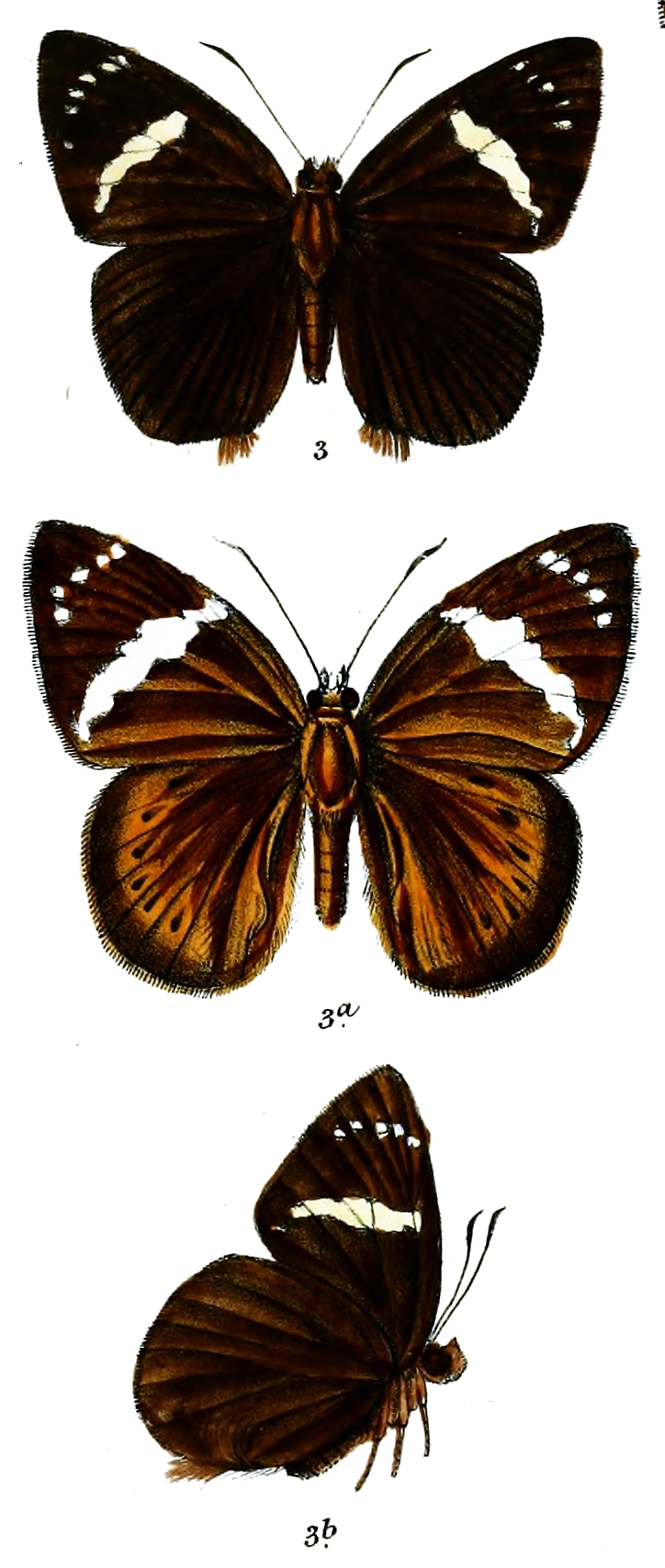
- From top: male, female and male underside

Scientific classification
- Domain: Eukaryota
- Kingdom: Animalia
- Phylum: Arthropoda
- Class: Insecta
- Order: Lepidoptera
- Family: Hesperiidae
- Genus: Capila
- Species: C. penicillatum

Binomial name
- Capila penicillatum (de Nicéville, 1893)

= Capila penicillatum =

Fringed dawnfly

Species of butterfly

Capila penicillatum, commonly known as the fringed dawnfly, is a species of hesperid butterfly found in India and Southeast Asia.

== Range ==
The butterfly occurs in India from Meghalaya (Khasi hills) eastwards to Canton, northern Vietnam and Hainan.

The type locality is the Khasi Hills.

== Status ==
It is very rare.
