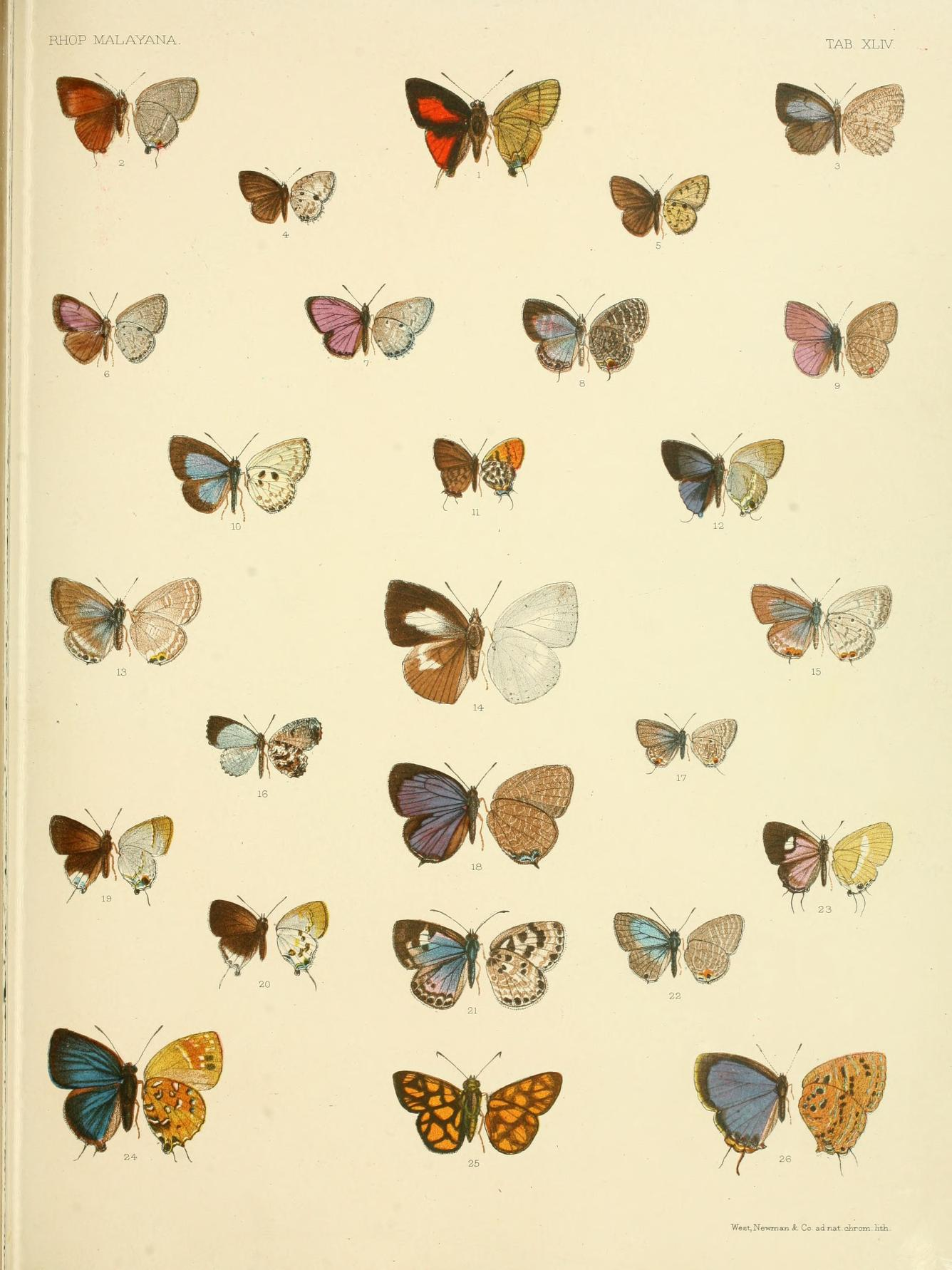
- Odina hieroglyphica in Rhopalocera Malayana figure 25

Scientific classification
- Kingdom: Animalia
- Phylum: Arthropoda
- Class: Insecta
- Order: Lepidoptera
- Family: Hesperiidae
- Subfamily: Tagiadinae
- Tribe: Tagiadini
- Genus: Odina; Mabille, 1891

= Odina (butterfly) =

Genus of butterflies

Odina is a genus of skipper butterflies in the family Hesperiidae first described by Paul Mabille in 1891. The species in this genus are found in the Indomalayan realm.

== Species ==
- Odina decoratus (Hewitson, 1867)
- Odina hieroglyphica (Butler, 1870)
- Odina chrysomelaena (Mabille, 1891)
