= Chernoyarskaya Odina =

Chernoyarskaya Odina Черноярская Одина
- Village
- Location within Perm Krai Location within Russia
- Coordinates: 57°16′N 57°26′E
- Country: Russia
- Region: Perm Krai
- District: Kishertsky District
- Time zone: UTC+5:00

Chernoyarskaya Odina (Russian: Черноярская Одина) is a rural locality (a village) in Kishertskoye Rural Settlement, Kishertsky District, Perm Krai, Russia. The population was 59 as of 2010.

== Geography ==
Chernoyarskaya Odina is located 22 km southeast of Ust-Kishert (the district's administrative centre) by road. Chyorny Yar is the nearest rural locality.
