= Odina, Permsky District, Perm Krai =

Odina Одина
- Village
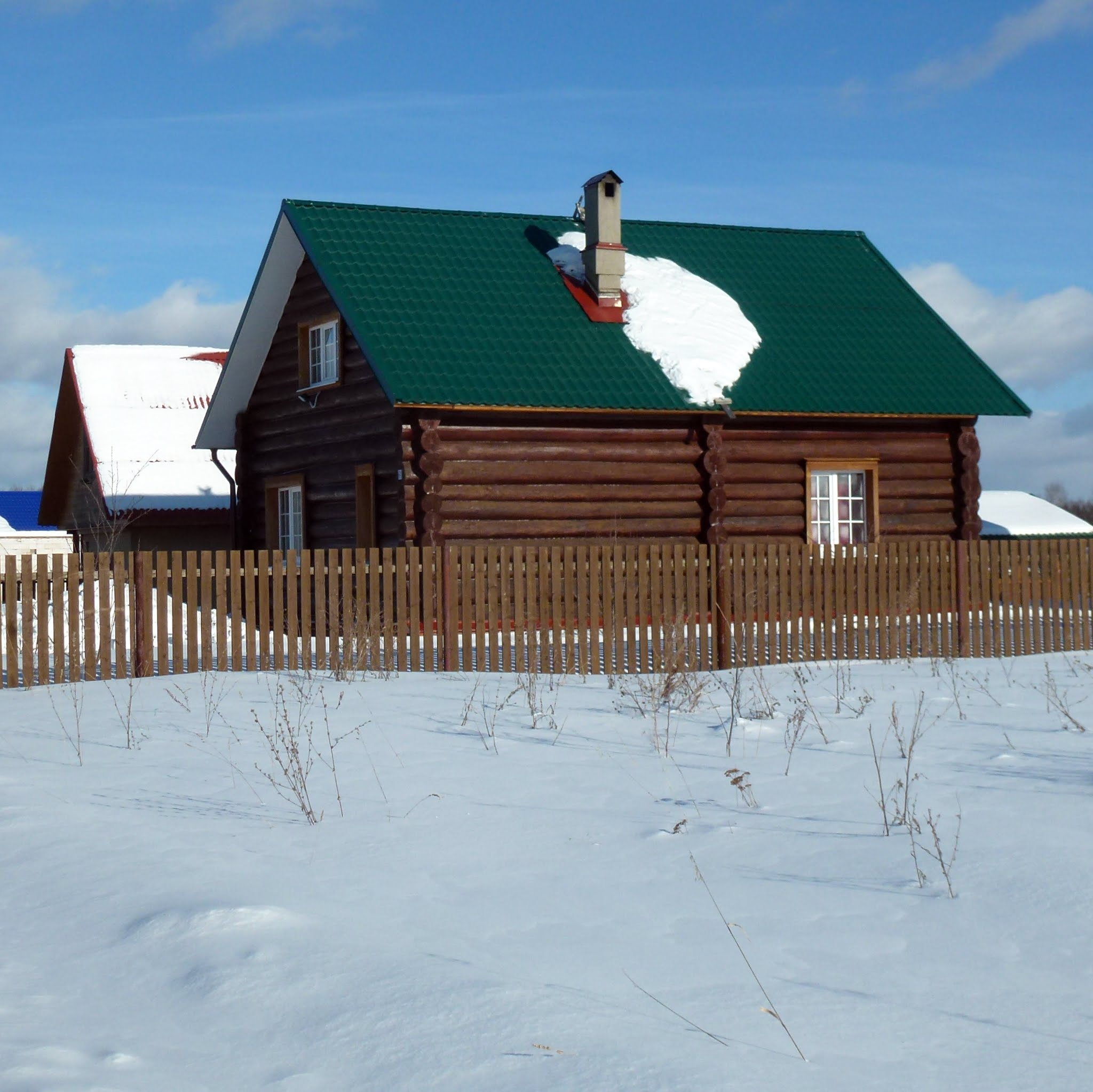
- A house in the Odina village

- Location within Perm Krai Location within Russia
- Coordinates: 58°01′N 55°41′E
- Country: Russia
- Region: Perm Krai
- District: Permsky District
- Time zone: UTC+5:00

Odina (Russian: Одина) is a rural locality (a village) in Ust-Kachkinskoye Rural Settlement, Permsky District, Perm Krai, Russia. The population was 49 as of 2010. There are 8 streets.

== Geography ==
Odina is located 53 km west of Perm (the district's administrative centre) by road. Ust-Kachka is the nearest rural locality.
