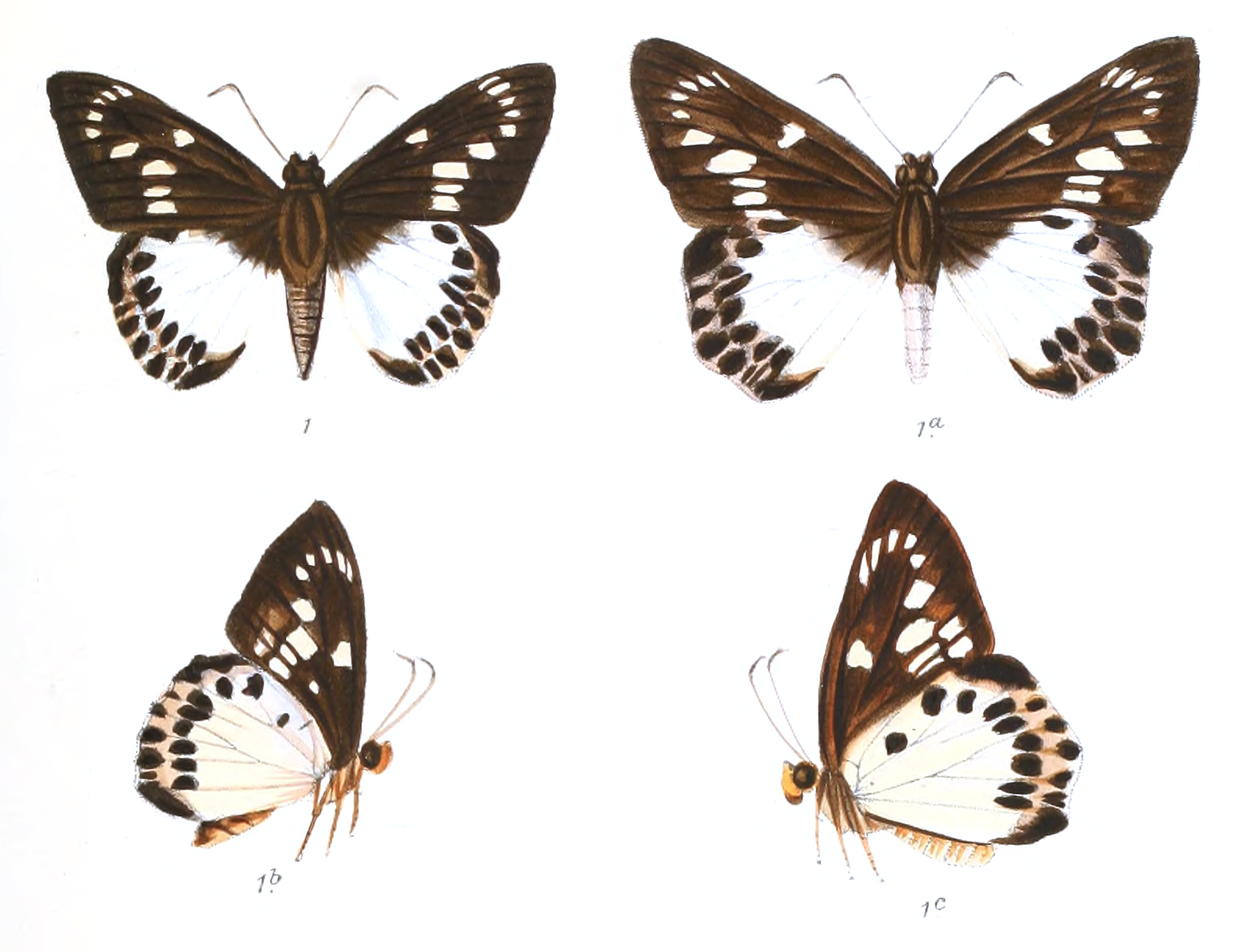
- Satarupa gopala

Scientific classification
- Kingdom: Animalia
- Phylum: Arthropoda
- Clade: Pancrustacea
- Class: Insecta
- Order: Lepidoptera
- Family: Hesperiidae
- Tribe: Tagiadini
- Genus: Satarupa; Moore, 1866

= Satarupa (butterfly) =

Genus of butterflies

Satarupa is a genus of spread-winged skippers in the family Hesperiidae.

== Species ==
- Satarupa formosibia Strand, 1927
- Satarupa gopala Moore, 1866
- Satarupa monbeigi Oberthür, 1921 West China
- Satarupa nymphalis (Speyer, 1879) South China, Korea, Ussuri
- Satarupa splendens Tytler, 1914 Naga Hills, Assam, Yunnan
- Satarupa valentini Oberthür, 1921 West China
- Satarupa zulla Tytler, 1915

== Etymology ==
Satarupa comes from the Pali śatá (Sanskrit शत shata) meaning "100" and rupa (Sanskrit रूप "rūpa") meaning "form" or "beauty", thus meaning "one hundred (beautiful) forms". It is the name given the wife of Manu; compare the goddess Saraswati.

== Citations ==
- Natural History Museum Lepidoptera genus database
