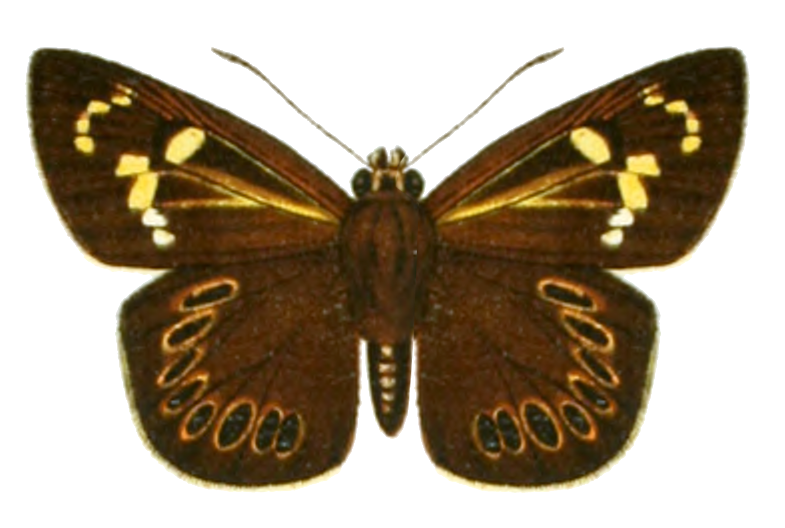

Scientific classification
- Domain: Eukaryota
- Kingdom: Animalia
- Phylum: Arthropoda
- Class: Insecta
- Order: Lepidoptera
- Family: Hesperiidae
- Genus: Capila
- Species: C. lidderdali

Binomial name
- Capila lidderdali (Elwes, 1888)

= Capila lidderdali =

Lidderdale's dawnfly

Species of butterfly

Capila lidderdali, also known as Lidderdale's dawnfly, is a species of hesperid butterfly found in India and Southeast Asia.

== Range ==
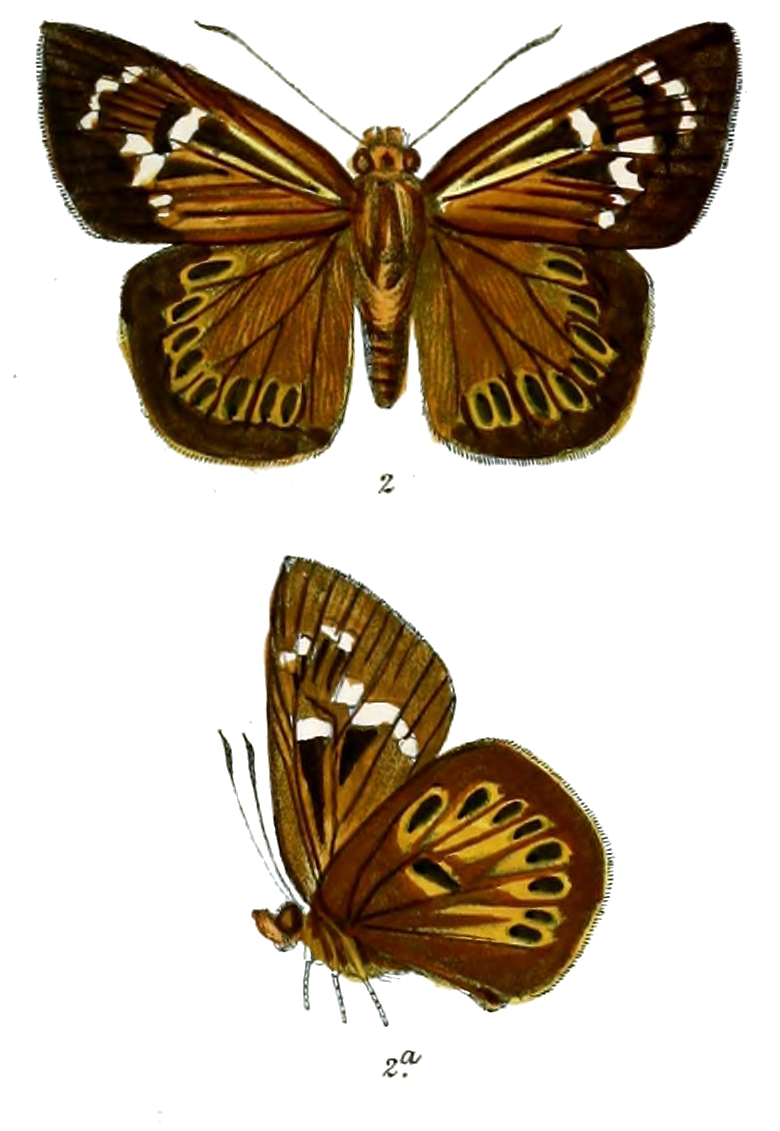
Male

The butterfly occurs in Nepal, Sikkim, Bhutan, Northeast India (Assam) and also in Laos.

The type locality is Darjeeling.

== Status ==
It is very rare in Bhutan.

== See also ==
- Pyrginae
- Hesperiidae
- List of butterflies of India (Pyrginae)
- List of butterflies of India (Hesperiidae)
