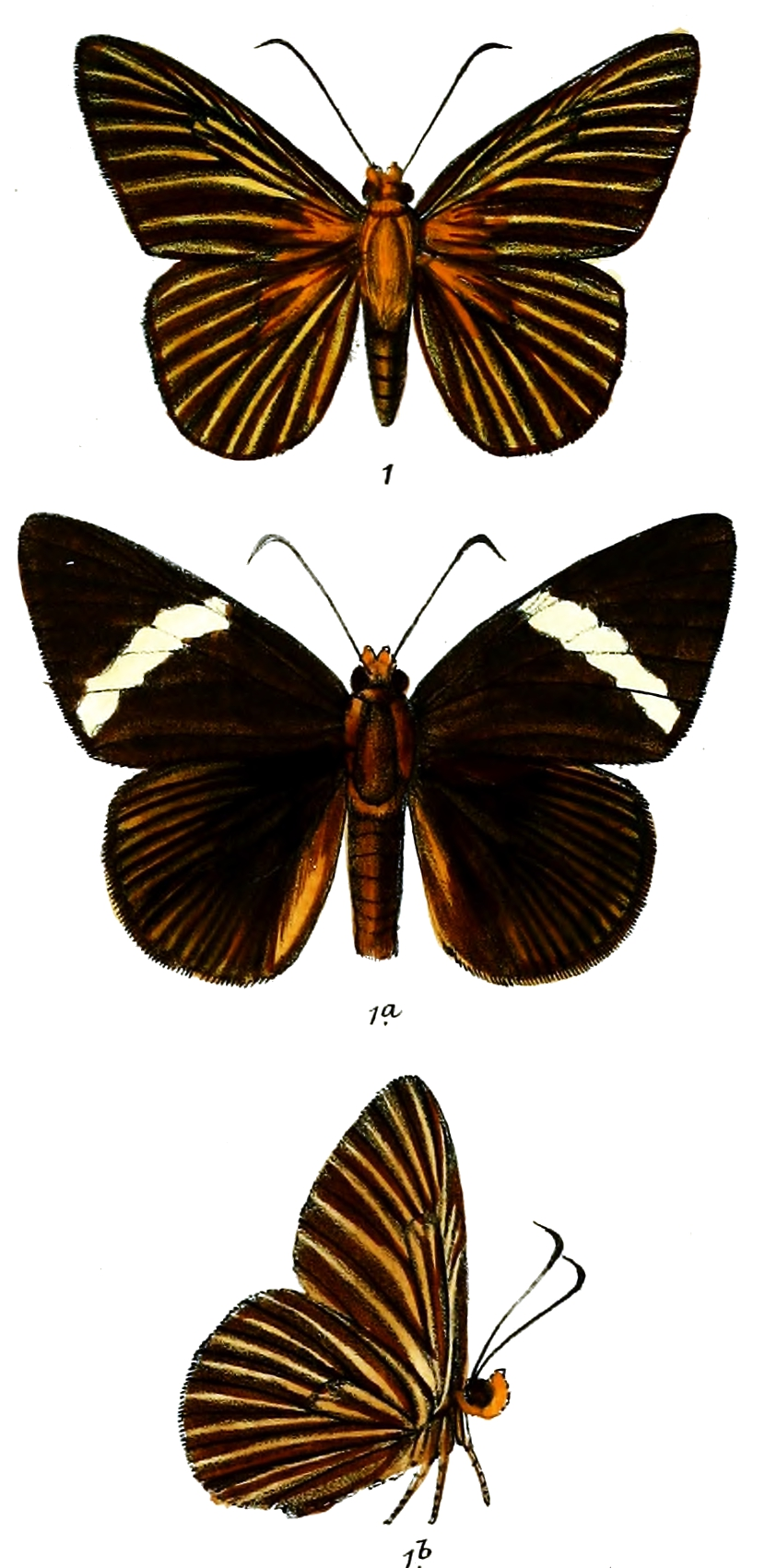
- From top: male, female, male underside

Scientific classification
- Domain: Eukaryota
- Kingdom: Animalia
- Phylum: Arthropoda
- Class: Insecta
- Order: Lepidoptera
- Family: Hesperiidae
- Genus: Capila
- Species: C. jayadeva

Binomial name
- Capila jayadeva (Moore, 1865)

= Capila jayadeva =

Striped dawnfly

Species of butterfly

Capilla jayadeva, the striped dawnfly, is a species of hesperid butterfly found in tropical Asia.

== Range ==
The butterfly is found in India from Sikkim and north-east Bengal to Assam and is also found in Laos.

In 1891, Edward Yerbury Watson wrote:

Found in Darjeeling. (Moore, P. Z. S., I. c.)
Also recorded from Sikkim by Mr. Elwes who notes that the female is without the orange on the thorax and base of wings, and has much broader, rounder wings than the male. One female recorded from Margherita, Assam, by Mr. Doherty.

— E. Y. Watson

The type locality is Darjeeling.

== Status ==
Rare.

== Description ==
Watson also gave this detailed description:

Male and female brown. Upperside base of wings clothed with orange-yellow hairs; both wings with a narrow longitudinal semitransparent streak between the veins, the discoidal cell having two streaks, and a third but short streak arising from the extremity. Thorax, head, and palpi, orange-yellow. Abdomen brown, with narrow white segmental bands; third joint of palpi and a few surrounding hairs and a spot on forehead brown. Underside paler brown, the semitransparent streaks being less prominent. Body and legs brown. Female similar, but with the thorax and base of wings brown.

He also stated:

With reference to this species Mr. A. V. Knyvett writes as follows:
"I flushed Capila jayadeva female off the underside of a leaf in a damp shady spot full of undergrowth. She flitted about like a Plesioneura for some time, and then settled on the underside of a broad leaf, with wings outspread. It was an impossible sort of a place to use a net on and I missed, with the result that she flew a short way and again settled in the same way and gave me as easy a chance of taking her as I could have wished for. The flight seemed a compromise between that of a Mycalesis or Yphthima and a Plesioneura, rather inclining towards the latter."

— E. Y. Watson
