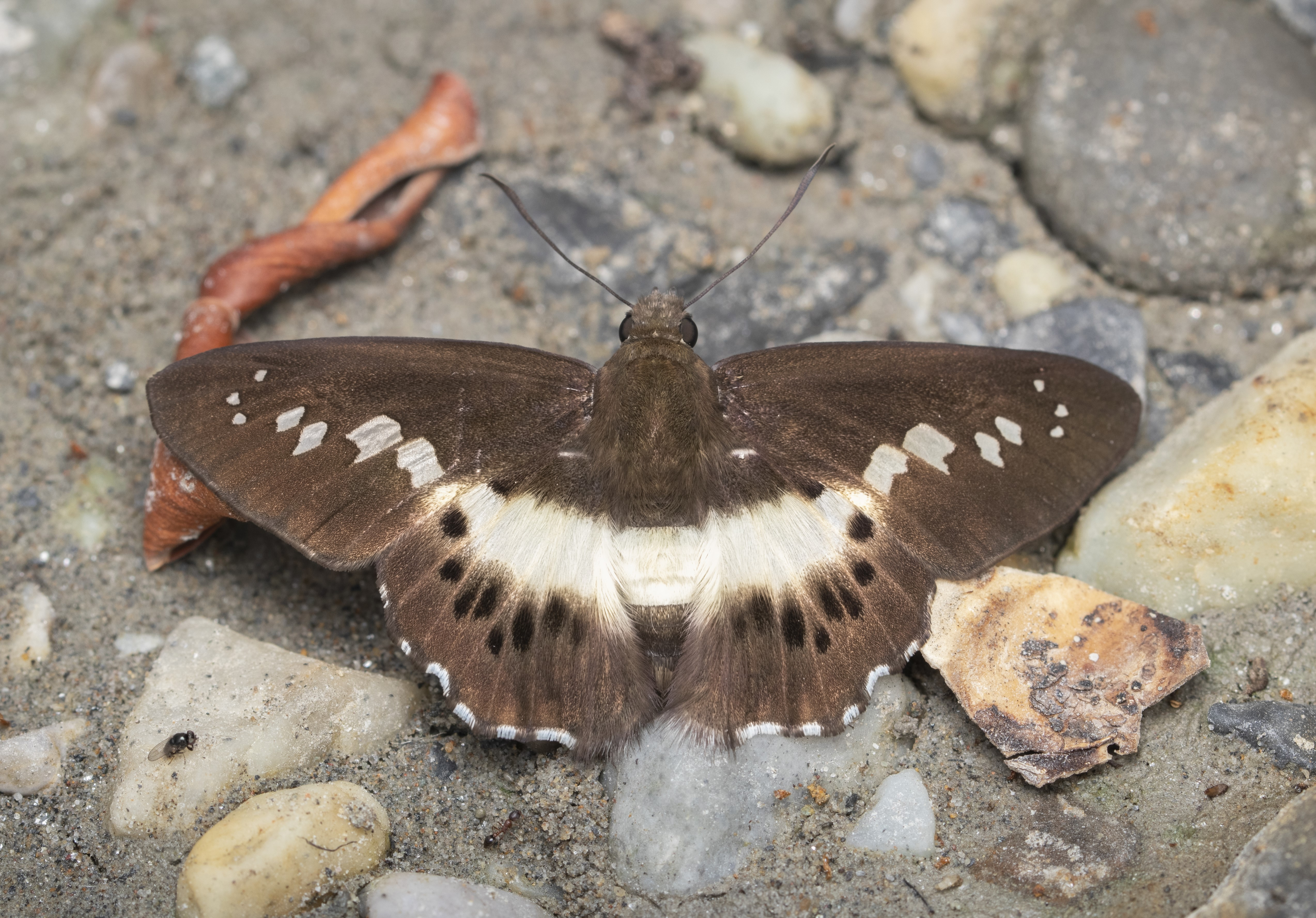

Scientific classification
- Kingdom: Animalia
- Phylum: Arthropoda
- Clade: Pancrustacea
- Class: Insecta
- Order: Lepidoptera
- Family: Hesperiidae
- Genus: Seseria
- Species: S. sambara

Binomial name
- Seseria sambara Moore, [1866]

= Seseria sambara =

Species of butterfly

Seseria sambara, also known as the Sikkim white flat, is a butterfly in the family Hesperiidae. It is found from Sikkim in India to Vietnam. It was described by Frederic Moore in 1866.

== Description ==
The upperside is dark maroon-brown. The upperside forewing has seven semi-transparent white spots. The upperside hindwing has a broad whitish band. The underside is as the upperside, but paler. The forelegs are black, while the hindlegs are white.

== Subspecies ==
There are two recognized subspecies -

- Seseria sambara sambara
- Seseria sambara indosinica
