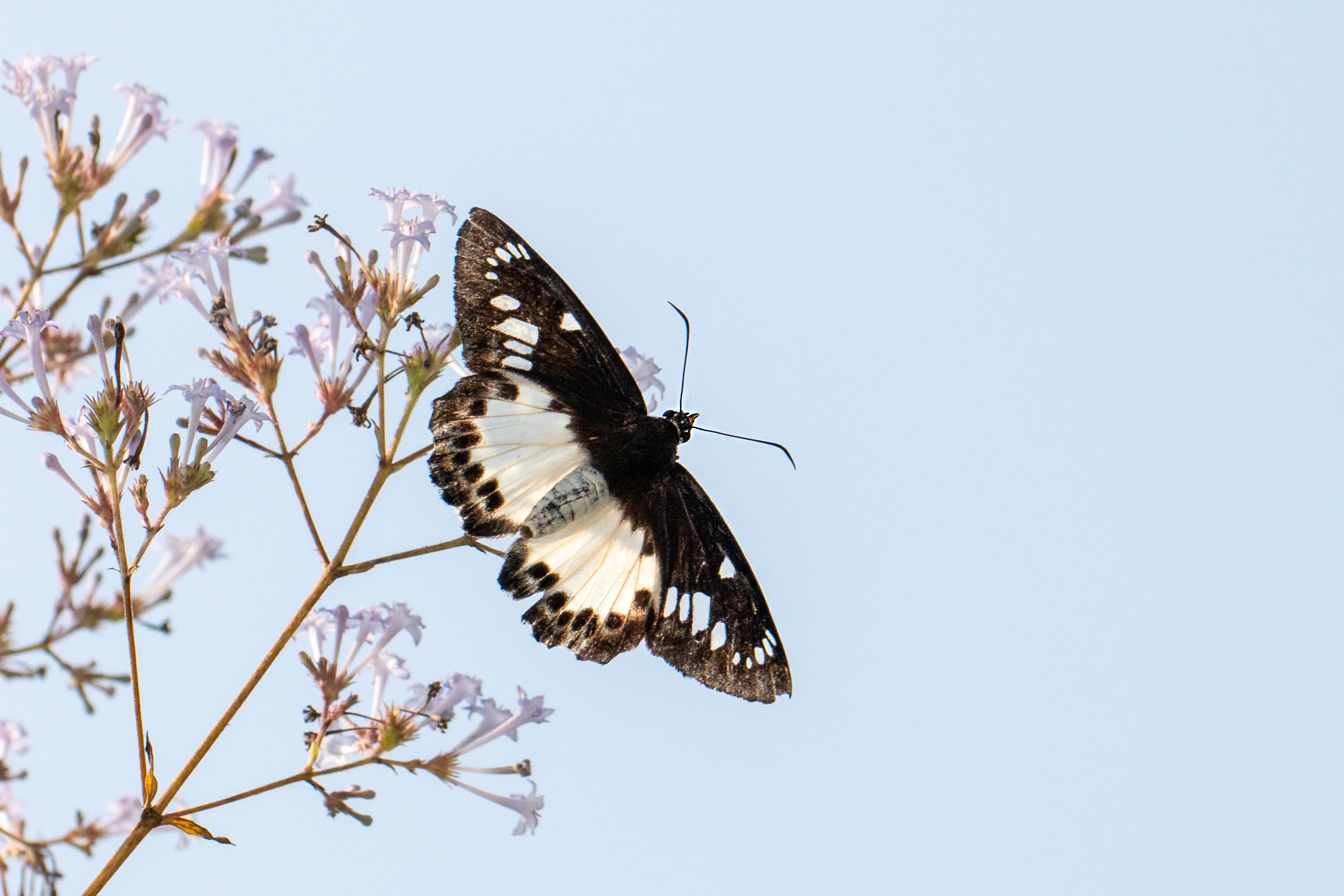

Scientific classification
- Domain: Eukaryota
- Kingdom: Animalia
- Phylum: Arthropoda
- Class: Insecta
- Order: Lepidoptera
- Family: Hesperiidae
- Genus: Satarupa
- Species: S. gopala

Binomial name
- Satarupa gopala Moore, 1865

Synonyms
- Satarupa tonkiniana Fruhstorfer, 1909; Satarupa malaya Evans, 1932

= Satarupa gopala =

Large white flat

Species of butterfly

Satarupa gopala, commonly known as the large white flat, is a species of skipper butterfly found in parts of the Indomalayan region , including India, Malaya, Thailand, Laos, China and Vietnam. It is the type species for the genus Satarupa.

== Subspecies ==
- Satarupa gopala gopala (Sikkim, Assam, northern Thailand, Laos, northern Vietnam, Hainan)
- Satarupa gopala malaya vans, 1932
