= List of butterflies of the Philippines =

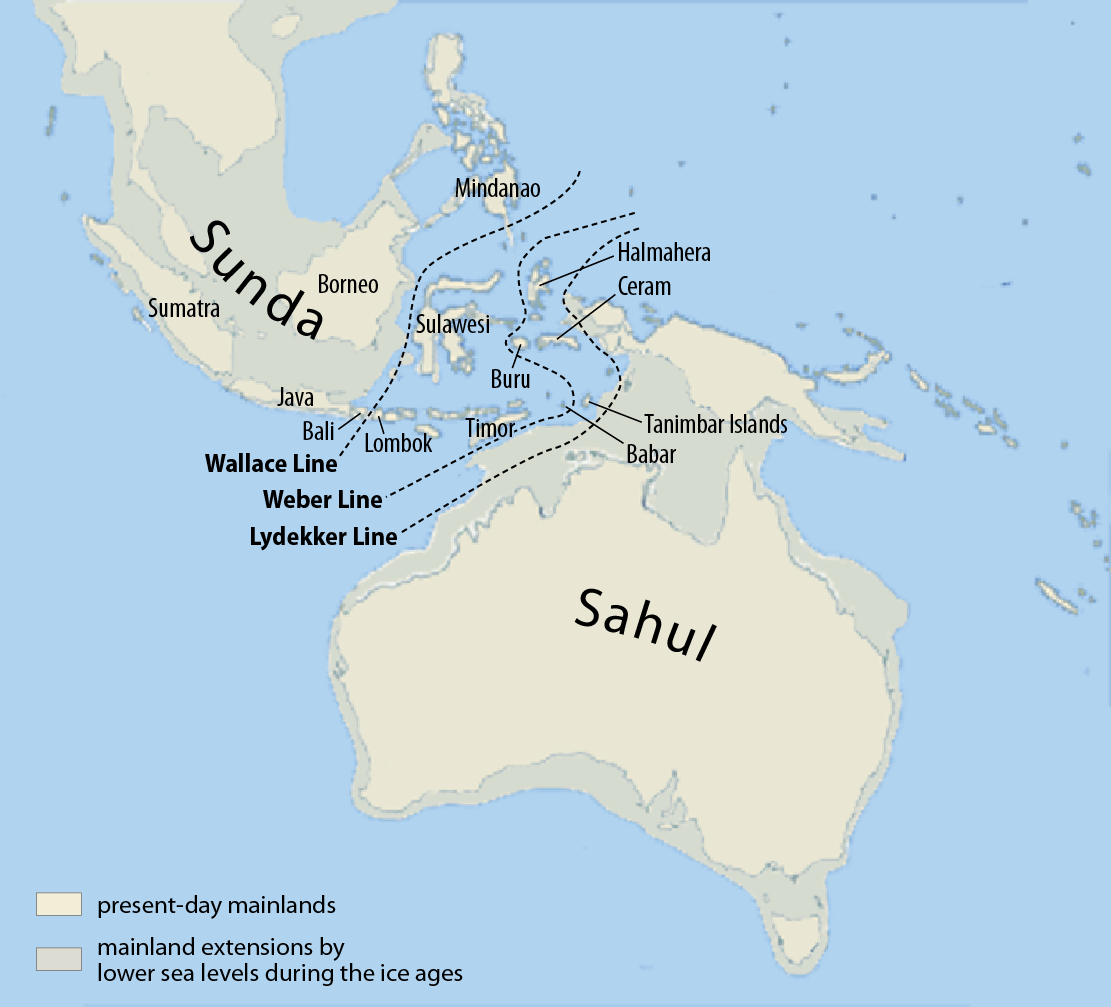
Position of the Philippines within Sundaland (except Palawan and the extreme western islands of the Sulu Archipelago which do not belong to Sundaland, because they are not situated on the Sunda shelf)

This is a partial list of the 907 species of butterflies of the Philippines. The Philippine archipelago is one of the world's great reservoirs of biodiversity and endemism. The archipelago includes over 7000 islands (allowing intense allopatric speciation), a total land area of 300,780 km^{2} and diverse ecoregions. 352 butterfly species are endemic to the Philippines. The Philippine Islands are in the Indomalayan realm.

Key: Ba=Babuyanes, Bl=Balabac, Bas=Basilan, Bat=Batanes, Bg=Bogao, Bl=Bohol, Bus=Busuanga, Bng=Bongao, Ca=Camotes, Cu=Cebu, Cn=Calamian Islands, Cy=Cuyo, Dt=Dinagat, Du=Dumaran, Gu=Guimaras, Hn=Homonhon, Jl=Jolo, Le=Leyte, Lz=Luzon, Ma=Mapun, Me=Masbate, Mi=Mindanao, Mo=Mindoro, Mq=Marinduque, N=Negros, P=Philippines, Pnn=Panaon, Pn=Palawan, Pl=Polillo, Py=Panay, Sn=Sibuyan, Sar=Sarangani, Sng=Sanga-Sanga, Sb=Sibutu, So=Siargao, Sr=Samar, Si=Siasi, Sq=Siquijor, Ta=Tablas, Twi=Tawi-Tawi, Ticao=Ticao.

== Papilionidae ==
genus: Troides

- Troides rhadamantus (Boisduval, 1836)
- Troides plateni (Staudinger, 1888)
- Troides magellanus magellanus (C. Felder & R. Felder, 1862)

genus: Trogonoptera

- Trogonoptera trojana brookiana (Wallace, 1855)

genus: Atrophaneura

- Atrophaneura semperi (C. Felder & R. Felder, 1861)

Atrophaneura semperi melanotus (Staudinger, 1889) (P, Pn, Cn)
Atrophaneura semperi albofasciata (Semper, 1892) (P, Mo)
Atrophaneura semperi supernotatus (Rothschild, 1895) (P, Bl, Cu, Le, Pnn, Sr)
Atrophaneura semperi baglantis (Rothschild, 1908) (P, N)
Atrophaneura semperi imogene Schröder & Treadaway, 1979 (P, Sn)
Atrophaneura semperi lizae Schröder & Treadaway, 1984 (P, Py)
Atrophaneura semperi sorsogona Page & Treadaway, 1996 (P, south-eastern Lz)
Atrophaneura semperi justini Page & Treadaway, 2003 (P, Me)
Atrophaneura semperi aphthonia (Rothschild, 1908) (Mi & Ins. vic)

genus: Losaria

- Losaria neptunus (Guérin-Méneville, 1840)

Losaria neptunus dacasini (Schröder, 1976) (P, Pn)
Losaria neptunus matbai Schröder & Treadaway, 1990 (P, Twi)

genus: Pachliopta

- Pachliopta atropos (Staudinger, 1888)
- Pachliopta aristolochiae (Fabricius, 1775)

Pachliopta aristolochiae interpositus Fruhstorfer, 1904 (Bat)

- Pachliopta kotzebuea (Eschscholtz, 1821)

Pachliopta kotzebuea kotzebuea (P, western and central Lz)
Pachliopta kotzebuea bilara (Page & Treadaway, 1995) (P, Bl, Cu)
Pachliopta kotzebuea deseilus (Fruhstorfer, 1911) (P, Mo, Mq, Me, Tco, Py, N, Sn Islands)
Pachliopta kotzebuea mataconga (Page & Treadaway, 1995) (P, southern Lz)
Pachliopta kotzebuea philippus (Semper, 1891) (P, Sr, Le, Dt, Mi, Pnn, Camiguin de Mi, So, Hn, Sar)
Pachliopta kotzebuea tindongana (Page & Treadaway, 1995) (P, north-eastern Lz, Ba)

- Pachliopta antiphus (Fabricius)

Pachliopta antiphus acuta (Druce, 1873) (P, Jl, Ma, Twi, Sng, Sb, Bas)
Pachliopta antiphus brevicauda (Staudinger, 1889) (P, Bus, Cy, Du, Pn)
Pachliopta antiphus elioti (Page & Treadaway, 1995) (P, Si)

- Pachliopta phlegon (C. Felder & R. Felder, 1864)

Pachliopta phlegon phlegon (C. Felder & R. Felder, 1864) (Mi)
Pachliopta phlegon splendida Schröder & Treadaway, 1984 (Sn)
Pachliopta phlegon strandi Bryk, 1930 (Gu, Lz, Mq, Mo, Pnn)

- Pachliopta mariae (Semper, 1878) endemic

Pachliopta mariae mariae (P, Bl, Cu, Le, Mi, Pnn, Sr)
Pachliopta mariae almae (Semper, 1891) (P, Lz, Pl)
Pachliopta mariae camarines Schröder & Treadaway, 1978 (P, Lz)

- Pachliopta leytensis Murayama, 1978 endemic
- Pachliopta schadenbergi (Semper, 1891)

Pachliopta schadenbergi schadenbergi (Semper, 1891) (central & north-western Lz)
Pachliopta schadenbergi micholitzi (Semper, 1891) (Camiguin de Lz, north-eastern Lz)

genus: Papilio

- Papilio slateri (Hewitson, 1857)
- Papilio clytia (Linnaeus, 1758)

Papilio clytia cuyo Medicielo & Hanafusa, 1994 (Cy)
Papilio clytia palephates (Westwood, 1845) (Camiguin de Lz, Catanduanes, Lz, Mq, Mo, N, Py, Sr, Sq)
Papilio clytia panopinus (Staudinger, 1889) (Cn, Pn)
Papilio clytia visayensis M. Okano & T. Okano, 1978 (Bas, Bl, Cu, Jl, Le, Mo, N, Py, Sr, Sq)

- Papilio osmana Jumalon, 1967 endemic
- Papilio carolinensis Jumalon, 1967 endemic
- Papilio paradoxa (Zinken, 1831)

Papilio paradoxa melanostoma Jordan, 1909 (Pn)

- Papilio benguetanus Joicey & Talbot, 1923 endemic
- Papilio demoleus Linnaeus, 1758

Papilio demoleus libanius Fruhstorfer, 1908

- Papilio demolion Cramer, [1776]

Papilio demolion delostenus Rothschild, 1908 (Pn)

- Papilio antonio Hewitson, 1875 endemic

Papilio antonio antonio Hewitson, 1875 (Le, Mi)
Papilio antonio niana Schröder & Treadaway, 1991 (N)

- Papilio helenus Linnaeus, 1758

Papilio helenus hytaspes C. Felder & R. Felder, 1862
Papilio helenus palawanicus Staudinger, 1888 (Bl, Pn)
Papilio helenus boloboc Page & Treadaway, 1995 (Bng, Sng, Sb, Twi)

- Papilio hipponous C. Felder & R. Felder, 1862

Papilio hipponous hipponous C. Felder & R. Felder, 1862 (Lz, Mq)
Papilio hipponous bazilanus Fruhstorfer, 1898 (Bl, Bas, Bl, Cn, Cu, Mi, N, Pn, Py, Sb, Twi)

- Papilio karna irauana Jumalon, 1975 (Pn)
- Papilio palinurus Fabricius, 1787

Papilio palinurus daedalus C. Felder & R. Felder, 1861
Papilio palinurus angustatus Staudinger, 1888 (Pn, Bl, Cy, Bus, Du)
Papilio palinurus selma Koçak, 1996
Papilio palinurus nymphodorus Fruhstorfer, 1909 (Bas)

- Papilio chikae chikae Igarashi, 1965

Papilio chikae hermeli (Nuyda, 1992)

- Papilio polytes Linnaeus, 1758

Papilio polytes pasikrates Fruhstorfer, 1898 (Bat)
Papilio polytes alphenor Cramer, [1776]
Papilio polytes ledebouria (Eschscholtz, 1821)

- Papilio lowi H. Druce, 1873
- Papilio rumanzovia rumanzovia Eschscholtz, 1821 endemic

Papilio rumanzovia tarawakana Page & Treadaway, 1995 (Bg, Sng, Sb, Twi)

- Papilio luzviae Schröder & Treadaway, 1991endemic (Mq)
- Papilio memnon memnon (Linnaeus, 1758)

genus: Graphium

- Graphium empedovana empedovana (Corbet, 1941)
- Graphium codrus (Cramer, [1776])

Graphium codrus melanthus (C. Felder & R. Felder, 1862) (Bl, Le, Lz, Mq, Me, Mo, Mi, N, Py, Sr, Sb)
Graphium codrus yayoeae Nihira & Kawamura, 1986 (Sng, Sb, Twi)

- Graphium sarpedon sarpedon (Linnaeus, 1758)
- Graphium sandawanum Yamamoto, 1977
- Graphium doson (C. Felder & R. Felder, 1864)

Graphium doson evemonides Honrath, 1884 (Bl, Sng, Sb, Twi)
Graphium doson gyndes Fruhstorfer, 1907 (Cn, Pn)
Graphium doson nauta Tsukada & Nishiyama, 1980 (Bl, Cu, Dt, Hn, Le, Lz, Mq, Me, Mo, Mi, N, Py, Pnn, Sr, So, Sb, Sq, Ta, Tco)
Graphium doson postianus Fruhstorfer, 1902 (Bat)

- Graphium eurypylus (Linnaeus, 1758)

Graphium eurypylus gordion (C. Felder & R. Felder, 1864) (P excluding Bl & Pn)
Graphium eurypylus mecisteus Distant, 1885 (Bl, Pn)

- Graphium arycles (Boisduval, 1836)

Graphium arycles arycleoides Fruhstorfer, 1915
Graphium arycles perinthus Fruhstorfer, 1915 (Pn)

- Graphium bathycles (Zinken, 1831)

Graphium bathycles bathycloides Honrath, 1884 (Pn)

- Graphium agamemnon agamemnon (Linnaeus, 1758)
- Graphium aristeus (Cramer, [1775])

Graphium aristeus hermocrates (C. Felder & R. Felder, 1864)

- Graphium decolor (Staudinger, 1888)

Graphium decolor decolor (P, Bl, Cn, Pn)
Graphium decolor atratus (Rothschild, 1895) (P, Mo)
Graphium decolor neozebraica Page, 1987 (P, Bl, Le, Lz, Mq, Me, N, Pnn, Py, Pl, Sr, Sq, Tco)
Graphium decolor sibuyana Page, 1987 (P, Sn)
Graphium decolor tigris (Semper, 1892)
Graphium decolor rebeccae (Page & Treadaway, 2003) (P, Camiguin de Lz)
Graphium decolor jamesi (Page & Treadaway, 2003) (P, Sb, Sng)

- Graphium euphrates (C. Felder & R. Felder, 1862)

Graphium euphrates euphrates (P, Bus, Cy, Hn, Le, Lz, Mq, Mi, Mo, Sr)
Graphium euphrates nisus Jordan (northern Lz)
Graphium euphrates domaranus (Fruhstorfer, 1903) (PPn, Du, Bl)
Graphium euphrates ornatus (Rothschild, 1895) (Halmahera, Ternate, Bachan)
Graphium euphrates Blensis Page, 1987 (P, Bl)
Graphium euphrates buhisanus Page, 1987 (P, Cu)

- Graphium euphratoides (Eimer, 1889) endemic
- Graphium macareus (Godart, 1819)

Graphium macareus palawanicola Koçak, 1980 (Pn)

- Graphium megaera (Staudinger, 1888) (Bl, Pn)
- Graphium ebertorum Koçak, 1983
- Graphium stratocles (C. Felder & R. Felder, 1861)

Graphium stratocles stratocles (C. Felder & R. Felder, 1861) (Cn, Mo, Pn)
Graphium stratocles senectus Tsukada & Nishiyama, 1980 (Lz, Mq)
Graphium stratocles stratonices Jordan, 1909 (Mi – Bl, Dt, Le, Mi, Pnn, Sr)

- Graphium delessertii (Guérin-Ménéville, 1839)

Graphium delessertii palawanus (Staudinger, 1889) (Pn)

- Graphium idaeoides Hewitson, 1855

genus: Lamproptera

- Lamproptera curius curius (Fabricius, 1787)
- Lamproptera meges (Zinken, 1831)

Lamproptera meges decius C. Felder & R. Felder, 1862
Lamproptera meges pessimus Fruhstorfer, 1909 (Bl, Du, Pn, Twi)

== Pieridae ==
genus: Catopsilia

- Catopsilia pyranthe (Linnaeus, 1758)
- Catopsilia pomona (Fabricius, 1775)
- Catopsilia scylla (Linnaeus, 1763)

Catopsilia scylla cornelia (Fabricius, 1787)

genus: Gandaca

- Gandaca harina (Horsfield, [1829])

Gandaca harina palawanica Fruhstorfer, 1910 (Cn, Pn)
Gandaca harina elis Fruhstorfer, 1910 (Sb)
Gandaca harina gardineri Fruhstorfer, 1910 (Bas, Bng, Jl, Sng, Twi)
Gandaca harina mindanaensis Fruhstorfer, 1910 (P excluding Bas, Cn, Pn, Sulu archipelago)

genus: Eurema

- Eurema brigitta (Stoll, 1780)

Eurema brigitta baguioensis Schröder, Treadaway & Nuyda, 1990 (northern Lz)
Eurema brigitta sachikoi Tsukada & Nishiyama, 1990 (northern Mi)
Eurema brigitta roberto Schröder, Treadaway & Nuyda, 1990 (northern Mi)
Eurema brigitta siquijorana Schröder, Treadaway & Nuyda, 1990 (Sq)

- Eurema laeta (Boisduval, 1836)

Eurema laeta semperi Moore, 1906 (northern Lz, Benguet Mountains)

- Eurema hecabe (Linnaeus, 1758)

Eurema hecabe hecabe (Linnaeus, 1758) (Bl, Cn, northern Lz, Pn)
Eurema hecabe sintica Fruhstorfer, 1910 (Mo)
Eurema hecabe tamiathis Fruhstorfer, 1910 (P excluding Bl, Cn, northern Lz, Mo, Pn)

- Eurema blanda (Boisduval, 1836)

Eurema blanda visellia Fruhstorfer, 1910 (Lz, Mo)
Eurema blanda mensia Fruhstorfer, 1910 (Bl, Cu, Le, N, Pnn, Sr)
Eurema blanda vallivolans Butler, 1863 (Bas, Bng, Cn, Dt, Mi, Pn, Sb, Twi)

- Eurema simulatrix (Semper, 1891)

Eurema simulatrix simulatrix (Semper, 1891) (Bl, Le, Mi, Pnn, Sr)
Eurema simulatrix princesae Morishita, 1973 (Pn)

- Eurema andersonii (Moore, 1886)

Eurema andersonii konoyi Morishita, (Pn)
Eurema andersonii prabha Fruhstorfer, 1910 (Pn)

- Eurema hiurai Shirozu & Yata, 1977

Eurema hiurai hiurai Shirozu & Yata, 1977 (Mi)
Eurema hiurai admiranda Morishita, 1981 (Lz)

- Eurema sari (Horsfield, [1829])

Eurema sari obucola Fruhstorfer, 1910 (Bl, Pn)

- Eurema sarilata (Semper, 1891) endemic

Eurema sarilata sarilata (Semper, 1891) (Dt, Le, Mi, Pnn, Sr)
Eurema sarilata boholensis M. Okano & T. Okano, 1990 (Bl)
Eurema sarilata aquila Shirozu & Yata, 1982 (Cu, Lz, Mq)
Eurema sarilata dayani Treadaway & Nuyda, 1990 (Bng, Sng, Sb, Twi)
Eurema sarilata mindorana Butler, 1898 (Mo)
Eurema sarilata perplexa Shirozu & Yata, 1982 (Bas)
Eurema sarilata risa Morishita, 1981 (Me, N, Py)
Eurema sarilata rosario Treadaway & Nuyda, 1990 (Hn)
Eurema sarilata sibuyanensis Yata & Treadaway, 1982 (Sn)
Eurema sarilata bazilana Shirozu & Yata (Bas)
Eurema sarilata luzonensis Shirozu & Yata (Lz)

- Eurema lacteola lacteola (Distant, 1886)
- Eurema alitha (C. Felder & R. Felder, 1862)

Eurema alitha alitha C. Felder & R. Felder, 1862) (Mi)
Eurema alitha bazilana Fruhstorfer, 1900 (Bas)
Eurema alitha esakai Shirozu, 1953 (Bat)
Eurema alitha garama Fruhstorfer, 1910 (Bng, Jl, Sng, Sb, Twi)
Eurema alitha jalendra Fruhstorfer, 1910 (Bl, Bl, Cn, Cu, Du, Lz, Mq, Mo, Pn)
Eurema alitha Lensis Fruhstorfer, 1910 (Ca, Le)
Eurema alitha samarana Fruhstorfer, 1910 (Sr)

genus: Delias

- Delias singhapura (Wallace, 1867)

Delias singhapura yusukei (Nakano, 1988) (Pn)

- Delias themis (Hewitson, 1861)

Delias themis themis (Hewitson, 1861) (Bl, Cu, Mi, Sr)
Delias themis kawamurai Nakano, 1993 (Mo)
Delias themis mihoae Nakano, 1993 (N)
Delias themis soteira Fruhstorfer, 1910 (Lz, Mq, Pl)
Delias themis yuii Nakano, 1993 (Me, Pnn)

- Delias baracasa Semper, 1890

Delias baracasa baracasa Semper, 1890 Mi
Delias baracasa benguetana Inomata, 1979 (northern Lz)

- Delias nuydaorum Schröder, 1975 (northern Mi)
- Delias paoaiensis Nihira & Kawamura, 1987 (northern Lz)
- Delias hyparete (Linnaeus, 1758)

Delias hyparete luzonensis C. Felder & R. Felder, 1862 (Bl, Cu, Le, Lz, Mq, Mo, N, Py, Pnn, Pl, Sr, Sn)
Delias hyparete domorana Fruhstorfer, 1911 (Du)
Delias hyparete mindanaensis Mitis, 1893 (Dt, Mi)
Delias hyparete palawanica Staudinger, 1889 (Cn, Pn)
Delias hyparete lucina Distant & Pryer, 1887 (Cagayan Sulu, Jl)
Delias hyparete melville Yagashita, 1993 (Bl)
Delias hyparete panayensis Rothschild (Py)

- Delias woodi Talbot, 1928

Delias woodi woodi Talbot, 1928 (southern Mi (Mt. Apo))
Delias woodi colini Schröder, 1977 (northern/northeastern Mi)
Delias woodi tholi (southern Mi (Mt. Parker))

- Delias blanca C. Felder & R. Felder, 1862

Delias blanca blanca C. Felder & R. Felder, 1862 (north-east Lz)
Delias blanca apameia Fruhstorfer, 1910 (Mi)
Delias blanca capcoi Jumalon, 1975 (N)
Delias blanca uichancoi Jumalon, 1975 (Bl)

- Delias pasithoe (Linnaeus, 1767)

Delias pasithoe balabaca Fruhstorfer, 1911 (Bl)
Delias pasithoe mera Talbot, 1928 (Lz, Mi)
Delias pasithoe pandecta Staudinger, 1889 (Pn)

- Delias hidecoae Nakano, 1993 Mo (Mt. Halcon)
- Delias henningia (Eschscholtz, 1821)

Delias henningia henningia Eschscholtz, 1821 (Cu, Le, Lz, Mq, Me, Mo, N, Py, Sr)
Delias henningia ochreopicta Butler, 1869 (Mi, Pnn)
Delias henningia camotana Fruhstorfer, 1910 (Ca)
Delias henningia pandemia Wallace, 1867 (Cn, Pn)
Delias henningia omblonensis Nakano & Yagashita, 1993 (Romblon, Sn)
Delias henningia voconia Fruhstorfer, 1910 (Bl)

- Delias ottonia Semper, 1890 (southeastern Mi)
- Delias mandaya Yamamoto & Takei, 1982 (eastern Mi)
- Delias levicki Rothschild, 1927

Delias levicki levicki Rothschild, 1927 (southern Mi (Mt. Apo))
Delias levicki borromeoi (eastern Mi (Mt. Parker))
Delias levicki justini Samusawa & Kawamura, 1988 (northern Mi (Mt. Kitanlad))

- Delias apoensis Talbot, 1928

Delias apoensis apoensis Talbot, 1928 (southern Mi (Mt. Apo))
Delias apoensis maizurui Yagashita & Nakano, 1993 (northern Mi (Mt. Kitanlad))

- Delias ganymedes Okumoto, 1981

Delias ganymedes ganymedes Okumoto, 1981 (northern N)
Delias ganymedes filarorum Nihira & Kawamura, 1988 (western Py)
Delias ganymedes halconensis Nakano & Yagashita, 1993 (northern Mo (Mt. Halcon))

- Delias georgina georgina (C. Felder & R. Felder, 1861) (northern Lz)
- Delias schoenigi Schröder, 1975

Delias schoenigi schoenigi Schröder, 1975 (southern Mi (Mt. Apo))
Delias schoenigi hermeli Samusawa & Kawamura, 1988 (northern Mi (Mt. Kitanlad))
Delias schoenigi malindangeana Nakano & Yagashita, 1993 (north(western Mi (Mt. Malindang)))
Delias schoenigi pasiana Yagashita, 1993 (eastern Mi (Mt. Pasian))

- Delias diaphana Semper, 1878

Delias diaphana diaphana Semper, 1878 (northern, southern & central Mi)
Delias diaphana basilisae Schröder & Treadaway, 1983 (north(western Mi))
Delias diaphana morishitai Nakano, 1993 (eastern Mi (Mt. Pasian))
Delias diaphana sakagutii Tsukada & Nishiyama, 1980 (south(eastern Mi)
Delias diaphana yatai Nakano, 1993 (eastern Mi (Tandga))

genus: Pieris

- Pieris canidia canidia (Linnaeus, 1768) (northern Lz)

genus: Leptosia

- Leptosia nina (Fabricius, 1793)

Leptosia nina terentia Fruhstorfer, 1910 (Bas, Cn, Cu, Cy, Mo, Mi, Pn, Py)
Leptosia nina georgi Fruhstorfer, 1910 (Lz)
Leptosia nina asukae Nihira & Kawamura, 1986 (Jl)
Leptosia nina malayana Fruhstorfer, 1910 (Sng, Sb, Twi)

genus: Cepora

- Cepora boisduvaliana (C. Felder & R. Felder, 1862)

Cepora boisduvaliana boisduvaliana (C. Felder & R. Felder, 1862) (Lz, Mq, Me, Mo, Py)
Cepora boisduvaliana balbagona Semper, 1890 (Camiguin de Mi)
Cepora boisduvaliana Cuensis Schröder, 1977 (Cu)
Cepora boisduvaliana cirta Fruhstorfer, 1910 (Bl)
Cepora boisduvaliana lytensis M. Okano & T. Okano, 1991 (Le)
Cepora boisduvaliana negrosensis M. Okano & T. Okano, 1991 (N)
Cepora boisduvaliana semperi Staudinger, 1890 (Bas, Mi, Sr, Tco)
Cepora boisduvaliana sibuyanensis Schröder, 1977 (Sn)

- Cepora aspasia (Stoll, [1790])

Cepora aspasia olga Eschscholtz, 1821 (central to southern Lz)
Cepora aspasia anaitis Fruhstorfer, 1910 (north(western Lz
Cepora aspasia fulcinea Fruhstorfer, 1911 (Pl
Cepora aspasia irma Fruhstorfer, 1910 (Bng, Jl, Sng, Si, Twi)
Cepora aspasia olgina (Staudinger, 1889) (Cn, Pn)
Cepora aspasia orantia Fruhstorfer, 1910 (Bl, Le, Mi)
Cepora aspasia phokaia Fruhstorfer, 1910 (Bl)
Cepora aspasia poetelia Fruhstorfer (Camiguin de Mi)
Cepora aspasia rhemia Fruhstorfer, 1910 (Me, Mo, N, Py, Sn)
Cepora aspasia tolmida Fruhstorfer, 1911 (Cu, Ca)
Cepora aspasia zisca Fruhstorfer, 1899 (Bas)

genus: Appias

- Appias olferna Swinhoe, 1890

Appias olferna peducaea Fruhstorfer, 1910 (Bl, Cu, Jl, Lz, Mq, Mo, Mi, N, Pn)

- Appias lyncida (Cramer, [1777])

Appias lyncida enarentina Fruhstorfer, 1900 (Bl, Cn, Pn)
Appias lyncida andrea Eschscholtz, 1821 - Lz, Mq, Mo, Mi)
Appias lyncida lepidana Fruhstorfer, 1910- Gu, N, Py)
Appias lyncida maccina Fruhstorfer, 1911 (Cy, Du)
Appias lyncida subenarete Schröder & Treadaway, 1989 (Sng, Twi)

- Appias nero (Fabricius, 1793)

Appias nero palawanicus (Staudinger, 1889) (Bl, Pn)
Appias nero domitia C. Felder & R. Felder, 1862 (Lz, Mq, Me)
Appias nero corazonae Schröder & Treadaway, 1989 (Bng, Sng, Sb)
Appias nero fleminius Fruhstorfer, 1911 (Mo)
Appias nero soranus Fruhstorfer, 1910 (Cu, N, Py, Sn)
Appias nero tibericus Fruhstorfer, 1910 (Bas)
Appias nero zamboanga C. Felder & R. Felder, 1862 (Bl, Dt, Le, Mi, Pnn, Sr)

- Appias nephele Hewitson, 1861 endemic

Appias nephele nephele Hewitson, 1861 (Lz)
Appias nephele aufidia Fruhstorfer, 1910 (Bas)
Appias nephele dilutior (Staudinger, 1889) (Cn, Pn)
Appias nephele elis Fruhstorfer, 1910 (Mi)
Appias nephele hostilia Fruhstorfer, 1910 (Jl)
Appias nephele invitabilis Fruhstorfer, 1910 (Mo)
Appias nephele Lensis Fruhstorfer, 1911 (Le, Sr)
Appias nephele tawitawiana Schröder & Treadaway, 1993 (Twi)

- Appias indra (Moore, 1857)

Appias indra treadawayi Schröder, 1975 (northern & north-western Mi (Mt. Kitanlad & Malindang))
Appias indra massilia Fruhstorfer, 1910 (Pn)

- Appias phoebe (C. Felder & R. Felder, 1861)

Appias phoebe phoebe (C. Felder & R. Felder, 1861) (northern Lz)
Appias phoebe mindana Yamamoto & Takei, 1980 (north-western Mi)
Appias phoebe montana Rothschild, 1896 (N (6,000-7,000 feet))
Appias phoebe rowelli Schröder & Treadaway, 1982 (south Pn)
Appias phoebe zamorra C. Felder & R. Felder, 1862 (Mo)

- Appias paulina (Cramer, [1777])

Appias paulina agave (C. Felder & R. Felder, 1862) (Dt, Hn, Le, Lz, Mq, Mi, N Pnn, Sr)
Appias paulina athena Fruhstorfer, 1902 (Bng, Sng, Sb, Twi)
Appias paulina nikomedeia Fruhstorfer, 1910 (Bas)
Appias paulina plaethoria Fruhstorfer, 1910 (Bl)
Appias paulina sithonia Fruhstorfer, 1911 (Mo)
Appias paulina terentilia Fruhstorfer, 1910 (Cn, Pn)

- Appias maria Semper, 1875

Appias maria maria Semper, 1875 (Lz, Mq)
Appias maria adorabilis Fruhstorfer, 1910 (Le, Mi, N, Sr)
Appias maria dolorosa Fruhstorfer, 1910 (Bl)
Appias maria kobayashii Nuyda & Kawamura, 1989 (Py)

- Appias albina (Boisduval, 1836)

Appias albina albina (Boisduval, 1836) (Bl, Bng, central & southern Pn, Sng, Sb, Twi)
Appias albina pancheia Fruhstorfer, 1910 (Mi, northern Pn
Appias albina semperi Moore, 1905 (Ba, Bl, Cu, Du, Gu, Lz, Mq, Mo, N)
Appias albina agatha Staudinger

- Appias remedios Schröder & Treadaway, 1980 (western Py)
- Appias waltraudae Schröder, 1977 (centralPn)
- Appias aegis (C. Felder & R. Felder, 1861)

Appias aegis aegis (C. Felder & R. Felder, 1861) (Le, Mi, Sr)
Appias aegis caepia Fruhstorfer, 1910 (Pn)
Appias aegis illana (C. Felder & R. Felder, 1862) (Ba, Cu, Lz, Mq, Mo, N)
Appias aegis sibutana Schröder & Treadaway, 1989 (Sb)

genus: Udaiana

- Udaiana cynis suluensis Schröder & Treadaway, 1989 (Bng, Sng, Twi)

genus: Ixias

- Ixias clarki Avinoff, 1925 (northern Lz, Mi)

genus: Saletara

- Saletara panda (Godart, 1819)

Saletara panda nathalia ((C. Felder & R. Felder, 1862) (Lz, Mq, Me, N, Py, Pl)
Saletara panda distanti Butler, 1898 (Sng, Twi)
Saletara panda erebina Fruhstorfer, 1900 (Pn)
Saletara panda hostilia Fruhstorfer, 1910 (Bl)
Saletara panda martia Fruhstorfer, 1910 (Bas)
Saletara panda nargosa Fruhstorfer, 1910 (Dt, Homonhan, Le, Mi, Sr)

genus: Pareronia

- Pareronia valeria (Cramer, [1776])

Pareronia valeriaPna Fruhstorfer, 1900 (Bl, Cn, Pn)
Pareronia valeria calliparga Fruhstorfer, 1910 (Du)
Pareronia valeria gulussa Fruhstorfer, 1910 (Cy)
Pareronia valeria valeriana Schröder & Treadaway, 1991 ((Twi)

- Pareronia nishiyamai Yata, 1981 (Pn (Cn, Cy, Pn)
- Pareronia phocaea (C. Felder & R. Felder, 1861) endemic

Pareronia phocaea phocaea (C. Felder & R. Felder, 1861) (Mi)
Pareronia phocaea ariamena Fruhstorfer, 1910 (Bas)

- Pareronia boebera (Eschscholtz, 1821) endemic

Pareronia boebera boebera (Eschscholtz, 1821) (Lz, Mq, Mo, Pl)
Pareronia boebera arsamota Fruhstorfer, 1910 (Bl, Cu, Me, N, Py, Sn)
Pareronia boebera bazilana Fruhstorfer, 1900 (Bas)
Pareronia boebera elaitia Fruhstorfer, 1910 (Pnn)
Pareronia boebera joloana Fruhstorfer, 1911 (Jl)
Pareronia boebera mutya Treadaway & Nuyda, 1994 (Bng, Sng, Sb, Twi)
Pareronia boebera trinobantes Fruhstorfer, 1911 (Le, Mi, Sr)

genus: Hebomoia

- Hebomoia glaucippe (Linnaeus, 1758)

Hebomoia glaucippe philippensis Wallace, 1863 (central & southern Lz, Mq)
Hebomoia glaucippe Blensis M. Okano & T. Okano, 1994 (Bl, Me, N, Py)
Hebomoia glaucippe cuyonicola Fruhstorfer, 1907 (Cy)
Hebomoia glaucippe domoranensis Fruhstorfer, 1911 (Du)
Hebomoia glaucippe erinna Fruhstorfer, 1910 (Babuyan, Bat, northern Lz)
Hebomoia glaucippe iliaca Fruhstorfer, 1911 (Bng, Dt, Jl, Le, Mi, Pnn, Sr, Sng, Sb, Twi)
Hebomoia glaucippe mindorensis Fruhstorfer, 1911 (Mo)
Hebomoia glaucippe palawensis Fruhstorfer, 1907 (Bl, Cn, Pn)
Hebomoia glaucippe reducta Fruhstorfer, 1907 (Pl)

== Nymphalidae ==
genus: Ariadne

- Ariadne merione (Cramer, [1777])

Ariadne merione crestonia (Fruhstorfer, 1912) (Bl, Pn)
Ariadne merione luzonica (C. Felder & R. Felder, [1867]) (P excluding Ba, Bl, northern Lz, Pn)

- Ariadne taeniata (C. Felder & R. Felder, 1861) endemic

Ariadne taeniata taeniata (C. Felder & R. Felder, 1861) (Ba, Lz, Mq, Me, N)
Ariadne taeniata adelpha (C. Felder & R. Felder, 1861) (Bas, Bl, Cu, Le, Mi)

genus: Laringa

- Laringa castelnaui (C. Felder & R. Felder, 1860)

Laringa castelnaui ottonis Fruhstorfer, 1906 (Pn)

genus: Cethosia

- Cethosia biblis (Drury, [1773])

Cethosia biblis barangingi Tsukada, 1985 (Bg, Jl, Sng, Sb, Twi)
Cethosia biblis insularis C. Felder & R. Felder, 1861 (Ba, Lz)
Cethosia biblis liacura Fruhstorfer, 1912 (central & western Mi)
Cethosia biblis placito Tsukada, 1985 (eastern Mi)
Cethosia biblis sandakana Fruhstorfer, 1899 (Bl, Cu, Ca, Cuyo, Le, Mq, Me, Mi, N, Py, Sr, Si)
Cethosia biblis tagalorum Fruhstorfer (Mo)

- Cethosia hypsea Doubleday, [1847]

Cethosia hypsea palawana Fruhstorfer, 1900 (Bl, Cn, Pn)

- Cethosia mindanensis C. Felder & R. Felder, 1863

Cethosia mindanensis mindanensis C. Felder & R. Felder, 1863 (Bas, south-western Mi)
Cethosia mindanensis festiva Fruhstorfer, 1899 (Bg, Jl, Sng, Si, Sb, Twi)

- Cethosia luzonica C. Felder & R. Felder, 1863 endemic

Cethosia luzonica luzonica C. Felder & R. Felder, 1863 (Lz)
Cethosia luzonica boholica Semper, 1888 (Bl, Cu, Le, Pnn, Sr)
Cethosia luzonica magindanica Semper, 1888 (Mi)
Cethosia luzonica pariana Semper, 1888 (Guimaras, Me, N, Py, Sn)

genus: Vindula

- Vindula erota (Fabricius, 1793)

Vindula erota montana Fruhstorfer, 1899 (Bl, Pn)

- Vindula dejone (Erichson, 1834)

Vindula dejone dejone (Erichson, 1834) (Bl, Cn, Dt, Le, Lz, Mq, Me, Mo, Mi, N, northern Pn, Py, Sr)
Vindula dejone basanica Fruhstorfer, 1912 (Jl)
Vindula dejone bongana Schröder & Treadaway, 1989 (Bg, Sng)
Vindula dejone palawanica Fruhstorfer, 1899 (Bl, S, Pn)
Vindula dejone sibutuensis Schröder & Treadaway, 1989 (Sb)

genus: Cupha

- Cupha erymanthis (Drury, [1773])

Cupha erymanthis erymanthis (Drury, [1773]) (Bl, Bg, Cn, Pn, Sng, Si, Twi)
Cupha erymanthis palawana (Fruhstorfer (Pn, Bl)

- Cupha arias C. Felder & R. Felder, [1867]

Cupha arias arias C. Felder & R. Felder, [1867] (P excluding Bas, Dt, Le, Mi, Pnn, Sr, Sb, Twi)
Cupha arias dapatana Grose-Smith, 1887 (Bas, Dt, Le, Mi, Pnn, Sr, Sb, Twi)
Cupha arias cacina Fruhstorfer (Pn, (Balabac))

genus: Phalanta

- Phalanta phalantha (Drury, [1773])

Phalanta phalantha phalantha (Drury, [1773]) (P)
Phalanta phalantha luzonica Fruhstorfer (P)

- Phalanta alcippe (Stoll, 1782)

Phalanta alcippe alcippoides Moore, 1900 (Bl, Pn, Sng, Sb, Twi)
Phalanta alcippe semperi Moore, 1900 (P excluding Bl, Bas, Pn, Sng, Sb, Twi)
Phalanta alcippe violetta Fruhstorfer, 1900 (Bas)
Phalanta alcippe pallidior Staudinger (Pn)

genus: Vagrans

- Vagrans egista (Cramer, [1780])

Vagrans egista brixia (Fruhstorfer) (northern P)

- Vagrans sinha (Kollar, [1844])

genus: Paduca

- Paduca fasciata (C. Felder & R. Felder, 1860)

Paduca fasciata fasciata (C. Felder & R. Felder, 1860) (P excluding Cn, Pn)
Paduca fasciata palloris Fruhstorfer, 1900 (Cn, Pn)
Paduca fasciata ortopia Fruhstorfer (southern to central P)

genus: Cirrochroa

- Cirrochroa tyche (C. Felder & R. Felder, 1861)

Cirrochroa tyche tyche (C. Felder & R. Felder, 1861)
Cirrochroa tyche guimarensis Fruhstorfer (P excluding Cn, Dumaran, Pn, Twi)
Cirrochroa tyche domorana Fruhstorfer) (P excluding Cn, Dumaran, Pn, Twi)
Cirrochroa tyche laudabilis Fruhstorfer, 1900 (Cn, Dumaran, Pn)
Cirrochroa tyche languyana Treadaway & Nuyda, 1994 (Twi)

- Cirrochroa satellita Butler, 1869

Cirrochroa satellita illergeta Fruhstorfer, 1912 (Pn)

- Cirrochroa menones Semper, 1888

genus: Terinos

- Terinos clarissa Boisduval, 1836

Terinos clarissa homonhonensis Treadaway & Nuyda, 1994 (Homonhon)
Terinos clarissa suluensis Treadaway & Nuyda, 1994 (Bg, Sng, Twi)
Terinos clarissa lucia Staudinger, 1889 (Pn)
Terinos clarissa luciella Fruhstorfer, 1912 (Bl)
Terinos clarissa lucilla Butler, 1870 (Le, Mi, Sr)

- Terinos romeo Schröder and Treadaway, 1984

genus: Argynnis

- Argynnis hyperbius (Linnaeus, 1763)

Argynnis hyperbius sagada Fruhstorfer, 1912 (N. Lz, N. Mi, Ba)

genus: Vanessa

- Vanessa cardui (Linnaeus, 1758)
- Vanessa indica (Herbst, 1764)
- Vanessa dejeani mounseyi Talbot, 1936

genus: Kaniska

- Kaniska canace (Linnaeus, 1763)

Kaniska canace benguetana Semper, 1888 (Lz, N. Mi)
Kaniska canace oreas Tsukada, 1985 (Py)
Kaniska canace oplentia Tsukada, 1985 (Mi)
Kaniska canace maniliana (Fruhstorfer, 1912) (Pn)

genus: Symbrenthia

- Symbrenthia lilaea (Hewitson, 1864)

Symbrenthia lilaea semperi Moore, 1889 (P excluding Bl, Lz, Pn, Sulu Archipelago)
Symbrenthia lilaea thimo Fruhstorfer, 1907 (Lz)

- Symbrenthia hippoclus (Cramer, [1779])
- Symbrenthia hippoclus (Cramer, [1779])

Symbrenthia hippoclus anna Semper, 1888 (Bl, Cu, Camiguin de Mi, Ca, Le, Mi, Pnn, Sr, Siargao)
Symbrenthia hippoclus aritus Fruhstorfer, 1912 (Cn)
Symbrenthia hippoclus galepsus Fruhstorfer, 1908 (Lz, Mq, Mo)
Symbrenthia hippoclus dissoluta Staudinger, 1889 (Bl, Pn)
Symbrenthia hippoclus jolonus Fruhstorfer, 1912 (Jl)
Symbrenthia hippoclus spherchius Fruhstorfer, 1908 (Bas)

- Symbrenthia hypselis (Godart, [1824])

Symbrenthia hypselis niphandina Fruhstorfer, 1912 (Pn)

- Symbrenthia hypatia (Wallace, 1869)

Symbrenthia hypatia mindanaensis Schröder & Treadaway, 1979 (Mi, P)

genus: Junonia

- Junonia iphita (Cramer, [1779])

Junonia iphita adelaida (Staudinger, 1889) (Bl, Pn)

- Junonia hedonia (Linnaeus, 1764)

Junonia hedonia ida (Cramer, [1775]) (P)
Junonia hedonia hondai Hayashi, 1973 (Pn)

- Junonia atlites atlites (Linnaeus, 1758)
- Junonia almana almana (Linnaeus, 1758)
- Junonia lemonias (Linnaeus, 1758)

Junonia lemonias janome Tsukada & Kaneko, 1985 (Cu, Guimaras, Lz, Mq, Mo, Pn)

- Junonia orithya (Linnaeus, 1758)

Junonia orithya leucasia Fruhstorfer, 1912 (P excluding Sb)
Junonia orithya metion Fruhstorfer, 1905 (Sb)

genus: Rhinopalpa

- Rhinopalpa polynice (Cramer, [1779])

Rhinopalpa polynice amoenice Fruhstorfer, 1912 (Mo)
Rhinopalpa polynice panayana Fruhstorfer, 1912 (Cu, N, W, Py, Sn)
Rhinopalpa polynice stratonice C. Felder & R. Felder, 1867 (Ba, Lz, Mq)
Rhinopalpa polynice tamora Fruhstorfer, 1900 (Bas)
Rhinopalpa polynice tawanice Schröder & Treadaway, 1989 (Bg, Sng, Sb, Twi
Rhinopalpa polynice validice Fruhstorfer, 1912 (Bohol, Dt, Le, Mi, Pnn, Sr, Siargao)

genus: Yoma

- Yoma sabina (Cramer, [1780])

Yoma sabina podium Tsukada, 1985 (P)

genus: Hypolimnas

- Hypolimnas anomala (Wallace, 1869)

Hypolimnas anomala anomala (Wallace, 1869) (P)
Hypolimnas anomala euvaristos Fruhstorfer (Mi and southern islands)
Hypolimnas anomala truentus Fruhstorfer (Lz, ?Ba)

- Hypolimnas misippus (Linnaeus, 1764)
- Hypolimnas bolina (Linnaeus, 1758)

Hypolimnas bolina joloana Fruhstorfer, 1912 (Bg, Jl, Sng, Sb, Twi)
Hypolimnas bolina kezia Butler, 1877 (Batanes)
Hypolimnas bolina philippensis Butler, 1874 (P excluding Batanes, Bg, Jl, Sng, Sb, Twi)

genus: Doleschallia

- Doleschallia bisaltide C. Felder & R. Felder, 1860

Doleschallia bisaltide philippensis Fruhstorfer, 1899 (P)

genus: Cyrestis

- Cyrestis cassander C. Felder & R. Felder, 1863

Cyrestis cassander cassander C. Felder & R. Felder, 1863 (Batanes, Lz, Mq, Mo)
Cyrestis cassander dacebalus Fruhstorfer, 1912 (Bl, Ca, Dt, Gu, Le, Sr)
Cyrestis cassander orchomenus Fruhstorfer, 1912 (Bas, Mi
Cyrestis cassander thessa Fruhstorfer, 1889 (Bl, Cn, Pn)

- Cyrestis maenalis Erichson, 1834

Cyrestis maenalis maenalis Erichson, 1834 (Lz, Mq, Py, Sb)
Cyrestis maenalis aiedius Fruhstorfer, 1912 (Bl)
Cyrestis maenalis cebuensis M. Okano & T. Okano, 1988 (Cu)
Cyrestis maenalis eumeleus Fruhstorfer, 1915 (Ba)
Cyrestis maenalis kynosura Tsukada & Nishiyama, 1985 (Dt, Le, Pnn)
Cyrestis maenalis N Martin, 1903 (N)
Cyrestis maenalis obscurior Staudinger, 1889 (Cn, Pn, Bl)
Cyrestis maenalis oebasius Fruhstorfer, 1912 (Bas
Cyrestis maenalis rizali Tsukada & Nishiyama, 1985 (Bl, E. Mi)
Cyrestis maenalis rothschildi Martin, 1903 (Mo)
Cyrestis maenalis zamboangensis Jumalon, 1975 (SW. Mi)

- Cyrestis kudrati Jumalon, 1975 endemic (Mi)
- Cyrestis nivea (Zinken, 1831)

Cyrestis nivea superbus Staudinger, 1889 (Cn, Pn)

genus: Chersonesia

- Chersonesia rahria (Moore, [1858])
- Chersonesia peraka Distant, 1884
- Chersonesia intermedia Martin, 1895
- Chersonesia excellens Martin, 1902

genus: Pandita

- Pandita sinope Moore, [1858]

Pandita sinope sinoria C. Felder & R. Felder, 1867 (Pn, Cns)
Pandita sinope satyrus Schröder & Treadaway, 2003 (Twi)

genus: Moduza

- Moduza thespias Semper, 1889 endemic
- Moduza procris (Cramer, [1777])

Moduza procris beckyae Schröder & Treadaway, 1987 (Bl)
Moduza procris pausanias (Staudinger, 1889) (Cn, Pn)
Moduza procris liberalis (Tsukada, 1991 (Bg, Sng, Sb, Twi)

- Moduza mata (Moore, [1858]) endemic

Moduza mata mata (Moore, [1858]) (Lz, Mq)
Moduza mata amida Fruhstorfer, 1912 (Cu, Le, Me, Mi, N, Py, Sb)
Moduza mata mindorana Tsukada, 1991 (Mo)
Moduza mata avalokita Fruhstorfer (Mi)

- Moduza urdaneta (C. Felder & R. Felder, 1863) endemic

Moduza urdaneta urdaneta (C. Felder & R. Felder, 1863) (Lz, Mi)
Moduza urdaneta aynii Nuyda, 1993 (Camiguin de Lz)
Moduza urdaneta kawamurai Hanafusa, 1987 (Polillo)
Moduza urdaneta miyabi Tsukada, 1991 (Mo)

- Moduza pintuyana (Semper, 1878) endemic

Moduza pintuyana pintuyana (Semper, 1878) (Le, Mi, Pnn, Sr)
Moduza pintuyana gahiti M. Okano & T. Okano, 1989 (Bl, Dt, Homonhon)
Moduza pintuyana mahastha Fruhstorfer, 1913 (Bas)
Moduza pintuyana tawitawiensis Treadaway & Nuyda, 1994 (Sng, Twi)

- Moduza nuydai Shirozu & Saigusa, 1970 endemic

Moduza nuydai nuydai Shirozu & Saigusa, 1970 (northern Lz)
Moduza nuydai hyugai Treadaway & Nuyda, 1993 (northern Mi (Mt. Halcon))

- Moduza jumaloni (Schröder, 1976) endemic

Moduza jumaloni jumaloni (Schröder, 1976) (Me, N, Py)
Moduza jumaloni punctata (Schröder & Treadaway, 1980) (Sn, Romblon)

genus: Athyma

- Athyma pravara Schröder & Treadaway, 1980
- Athyma salvini Fruhstorfer, 1912
- Athyma alcamene C. Felder & R. Felder, 1863

Athyma alcamene alcamene C. Felder & R. Felder, 1863 (Bas, Bl, Le, Mi, Pnn, Sr)
Athyma alcamene angelesi Schröder & Treadaway, 1992 (Twi)
Athyma alcamene baltazarae Jumalon, 1975 (N, western Pnn)
Athyma alcamene generosior Fruhstorfer, 1906 (Mo)
Athyma alcamene jagori Fruhstorfer, 1906 (Lz)
Athyma alcamene mensis (Schröder & Treadaway, 1991 (Me)

- Athyma reta suluana (Schröder & Treadaway, 1991
- Athyma arayata C. Felder & R. Felder, 1863
- Athyma maenas C. Felder & R. Felder, 1863

Athyma maenas maenas C. Felder & R. Felder, 1863 (Burias, Lz)
Athyma maenas semperi Moore, 1896 (Bas, Bl, Dt, Le, Mi, Pnn, Sr)
Athyma maenas maenides Fruhstorfer (Bas)

- Athyma speciosa Staudinger, 1889 endemic
- Athyma speciosa Staudinger, 1889 (Pn, Bl)

Athyma speciosa speciosa Staudinger, 1889 (Cn, Pn)
Athyma speciosa preciosa Fruhstorfer, 1912 (Bl)

- Athyma kasa Moore, 1858

Athyma kasa kasa Moore, 1858 (Ba, Lz, Mq, Polillo)
Athyma kasa bignayana Fruhstorfer, 1906 (Gu, Me, N, Py, Sb, Siquijor)
Athyma kasa epimethis C. Felder & R. Felder, 1863 (Mo)
Athyma kasa gordia C. Felder & R. Felder, 1863 (Bas, Camiguin de Mi, Dt, Mi)
Athyma kasa leyteana Murayama, 1982 (Le, Sr)
Athyma kasa paragordia Semper, 1889 (Bl)
Athyma kasa parakasa Semper, 1889 (Cu, Ca, Mi)
Athyma kasa kasina Fruhstorfer (Lz)
Athyma kasa privata Fruhstorfer (locality unknown)
Athyma kasa bazilana Fruhstorfer (Bas)

- Athyma saskia (Schröder & Treadaway, 1991
- Athyma godmani Staudinger, 1889

Athyma godmani godmani Staudinger, 1889 (Pn)
Athyma godmani reducta Fruhstorfer, 1906 (Bl)

- Athyma venata Staudinger, 1889
- Athyma separata Staudinger, 1889

Athyma separata separata Staudinger, 1889 (Pn)
Athyma separata gracilis Schröder, Treadaway & Nuyda, 1990 (Cn)

- Athyma asura Moore, 1858
- Athyma mindanica Murayama, 1978
- Athyma obsoleta Schröder & Treadaway, 1979
- Athyma perius perius (Linnaeus, 1758)
- Athyma nefte (Cramer, [1779])

Athyma nefte subrata Moore, 1858 (Bg, Sng, Sb, Twi)

- Athyma selenophora (Kollar, [1844])

Athyma selenophora shiraishii Tsukada & Kaneko, 1985 (Pn)

genus: Tacola

- Tacola larymna (Doubleday, [1848])

Tacola larymna agina Fruhstorfer, 1898 (Pn)
Tacola larymna negrosiana (Schröder & Treadaway, 1988) (northern N)
Tacola larymna panayana Schröder & Treadaway, 1979 (western Py)

- Tacola magindana (Semper, 1878) endemic

Tacola magindana magindana (Semper, 1878) (Le, Mi, Sr)
Tacola magindana pizarrasi M. Okano & T. Okano, 1988 (Bl)
Tacola magindana zilana Fruhstorfer, 1906 (Bas)

genus: Tarratia

- Tarratia gutama (Moore, 1858)

Tarratia gutama gutama (Moore, 1858) (Ba, Lz, Mo)
Tarratia gutama canlaonensis M. Okano & T. Okano, 1986 (N)
Tarratia gutama cebuensis M. Okano & T. Okano, 1986 (Cu)
Tarratia gutama sibuyana Tsukada, 1991 (Sn)
Tarratia gutama teldeniya Fruhstorfer, 1912 (Bl, Cn, Pn)

- Tarratia cosmia (Semper, 1878)

Tarratia cosmia cosmia (Semper, 1878) (Bl, Bg, Ca, Dt, Le, Mi, Sr, Sng, Sb, Twi)
Tarratia cosmia pindola Fruhstorfer, 1906 (Bas)

genus: Lebadea

- Lebadea martha (Fabricius, 1787)

Lebadea martha jecieli Schröder, Treadaway & Nuyda, 1990 (Cn)
Lebadea martha paulina Staudinger, 1889 (Bl, Pn)
Lebadea martha undulata Schröder, Treadaway & Nuyda, 1990 (Sng)
Lebadea martha tessellata Schröder, Treadaway & Nuyda, 1990 (Sb)

genus: Parthenos

- Parthenos sylvia (Cramer, [1775])

Parthenos sylvia butlerinus Fruhstorfer, 1898 (Bazlabac, Dumaran, Pn)
Parthenos sylvia jaloensis Fruhstorfer, 1898 (Jl)
Parthenos sylvia philippensis Fruhstorfer, 1898 (P excluding Bl, Bg, Dumaran, Jl, Pn, Sng, Sb, Twi)
Parthenos sylvia selene (Schröder & Treadaway, 1991 (Bg, Sng, Sb, Twi)

genus: Tanaecia

- Tanaecia calliphorus C. Felder & R. Felder, 1863

Tanaecia calliphorus calliphorus (C. Felder & R. Felder, 1863) (Lz, Mq, Polillo)
Tanaecia calliphorus smaragdifera Fruhstorfer, 1912 (Mo)
Tanaecia calliphorus treadawayi Tsukada, 1991 (Sn)
Tanaecia calliphorus volupia Tsukada & Nishiyama, 1981 (Camiguin de Lz)

- Tanaecia dodong (Schröder & Treadaway, 1878) endemic
- Tanaecia susoni Jumalon, 1975 endemic
- Tanaecia lupina H. Druce, 1874 endemic

Tanaecia lupina lupina H. Druce, 1874 (Jl)
Tanaecia lupina borromeoi Schröder, 1977 (Sn)
Tanaecia lupina howarthi Jumalon, 1975 (N)
Tanaecia lupina panayana Schröder & Treadaway, 1980 (Py)

- Tanaecia leucotaenia Semper, 1878 endemic

Tanaecia leucotaenia leucotaenia Semper, 1878 (Biliran, Bl, Ca, Le, Pnn, Sr)
Tanaecia leucotaenia aquamarina Fruhstorfer, 1912 (Mi)
Tanaecia leucotaenia dinorah Fruhstorfer, 1899 (Bas)
Tanaecia leucotaenia exul Tsukada & Nishiyama, 1980 (Dt
Tanaecia leucotaenia kulaya Treadaway & Nuyda, 1994 (Homonhon)

- Tanaecia aruna (C. Felder & R. Felder, 1860)

Tanaecia aruna pallida Schröder, Treadaway & Nuyda, 1990 (Cn)
Tanaecia aruna dohertyi Butler, 1901 (Sulu Archipelago)
Tanaecia aruna palawana Staudinger, 1889 (Pn)
Tanaecia aruna rudraca Fruhstorfer, 1913 (Bl)

genus: Cynitia

- Cynitia cocytina (Horsfield) synonym Tanaecia cocytina (Horsfield, 1829)

Cynitia cocytina darani Fruhstorfer, 1913 (Jl)
Cynitia cocytina uposatha Fruhstorfer, 1898 (Bl)

- Cynitia phlegethon (Semper, 1888) synonym Tanaecia godartii phlegethon (Semper, 1888) endemic

Cynitia phlegethon phlegethon (Semper, 1888) (Mi, Sr)
Cynitia phlegethon nirodha Fruhstorfer, 1898 (Bas)
Cynitia phlegethon visayana Schröder & Treadaway, 1981 (Le, Sr)

- Cynitia godartii (G.R.Gray, 1846) synonym Tanaecia godartii (Gray, 1846)

Cynitia godartii dhayma Fruhstorfer, 1898 (Jl, Sb)

- Cynitia semperi (Staudinger, 1889) synonym Tanaecia semperi (Staudinger, 1889) endemic

Cynitia semperi semperi (Staudinger, 1889) (Pn)
Cynitia semperi candida Schröder, Treadaway & Nuyda, 1990 (Cn)

genus: Euthalia

- Euthalia monina (Fabricius, 1787)

Euthalia monina kayumanggia Treadaway & Nuyda, 1994 (Pn)
Euthalia monina suluana Fruhstorfer, 1902 (Sulu, Jl)

- Euthalia tanagra Staudinger, 1889
- Euthalia aconthea (Cramer, [1777])

Euthalia aconthea bongaoensis Schröder, Treadaway & Nuyda, 1990 (Bg, Sng, Twi)
Euthalia aconthea joloana Staudinger, 1889 (Jl)
Euthalia aconthea obatrata Yokochi, 1994 (Dumaran)
Euthalia aconthea palawana Staudinger, 1889 (Cn, Pn)
Euthalia aconthea sibutana Schröder, Treadaway & Nuyda, 1990 (Sb)

- Euthalia alpheda (Godart, 1824)

Euthalia alpheda cusama Fruhstorfer, 1898 (Dt, Homonhon, Mi)
Euthalia alpheda leytana Schröder & Treadaway, 1982 (Le, Sr)
Euthalia alpheda liaoi Schröder & Treadaway, 1982 (N, Py)
Euthalia alpheda mindorensis Schröder & Treadaway, 1982 (Mo)
Euthalia alpheda phelada Semper, 1888 (Lz)
Euthalia alpheda rodriguezi Schröder & Treadaway, 1982 (Pn)
Euthalia alpheda sibuyana Schröder & Treadaway, 1982 (Sn, Romblon)
Euthalia alpheda soregina Fruhstorfer, 1898 (Sulu Archipelago, Jl)

- Euthalia lusiada (C. Felder & R. Felder, 1863)

Euthalia lusiada lusiada (C. Felder & R. Felder, 1863) (Ba, Lz, Mq)
Euthalia lusiada malissia Fruhstorfer, 1898 (Bas, Dt, Homonhon, Le, Mi, Pnn, Sr)
Euthalia lusiada soloni M. Okano & T. Okano, 1990 (Bl)
Euthalia lusiada mindorana Fruhstorfer, 1899 (Me, Mo)
Euthalia lusiada schoenigi Schröder & Treadaway, 1978 (N)

- Euthalia mindanaensis Schröder & Treadaway, 1978
- Euthalia anosia (Moore, [1858])

Euthalia anosia tawitawia Treadaway & Nuyda, 1994 (Twi)

- Euthalia mahadeva (Moore, 1859)

Euthalia mahadeva dacasini Hanafusa, 1990 (Bl)
Euthalia mahadeva ingae Schröder & Treadaway, 1990 (Bg, Sng, Sb, Twi)
Euthalia mahadeva rhamases Staudinger, 1889 (Cn, Pn)
Euthalia mahadeva yui Yockochi, 1994 (Dumaran)

- Euthalia lubentina (Cramer, [1777])

Euthalia lubentina boholensis M. Okano & T. Okano, 1990 (Bl)
Euthalia lubentina goertzi Jumalon, 1975 (N, Pnn)
Euthalia lubentinaleytensis Jumalon, 1975 (Le, Sr)
Euthalia lubentina mindorana Tsukada, 1991 (Mo)
Euthalia lubentina tsukada Koçak, 1996
Euthalia lubentina nadenya Fruhstorfer, 1898 (Lz, Mq)
Euthalia lubentina philippensis Fruhstorfer, 1899 (Bas, Dt, Mi)

- Euthalia djata Distant & Pryer, 1887

Euthalia djata ludonia Staudinger, 1889 (Pn)

- Euthalia adonia (Cramer, [1779])

Euthalia adonia princesa Fruhstorfer, 1899 (Pn)

genus: Bassarona

- Bassarona piratica (Semper, 1888) endemic

Bassarona piratica piratica (Semper, 1888) (Camiguin de Mi, Mi, Lz, Mo)
Bassarona piratica dinagatensis Tsukada, 1991 (Dt)
Bassarona piratica negrosiana Schröder & Treadaway, 1987 (N)
Bassarona piratica romeo Schröder & Treadaway, 1987 (northern Mi)
Bassarona piratica sarmana Fruhstorfer, 1898 (Bas)
Bassarona piratica subpiratica Schröder & Treadaway, 1987 (Lz)
Bassarona piratica medaga Fruhstorfer (Mi, Camiguin de Mi)

- Bassarona dunya (Doubleday, [1848])

Bassarona dunya monara Fruhstorfer, 1898 (Pn)

- Bassarona teuta (Doubleday, [1848])

Bassarona teuta balabacana Tsukada, 1991 (Bl)
Bassarona teuta eson de Nicéville, 1894 (Pn)

genus: Dophla

- Dophla evelina (Stoll, 1790)

Dophla evelina albusequus Nihira & Kawamura, 1986 (Sng, Twi)
Dophla evelina balabacana Tsukada, 1991 (Bl)
Dophla evelina chloe Schröder & Treadaway, 1990 (Me, N, Py, Sn)
Dophla evelina circe Schröder & Treadaway, 1990 (Sb)
Dophla evelina eva Felder, 1867 (Ba, Catanduanes, Lz, Mq, Mo)
Dophla evelina proditrix Fruhstorfer, 1898 (Bas, Biliran, Bl, Camiguin de Mi, Dt, Le, Mi, Pnn)
Dophla evelina samarensis Tsukada, 1991 (Sr)
Dophla evelina tyawena Fruhstorfer, 1898 (Cn, Pn)

genus: Lexias

- Lexias hikarugenzi Tsukada & Nishiyama, 1980
- Lexias damalis Erichson, 1834

Lexias damalis damalis Erichson, 1834 (Ba, Lz)
Lexias damalis antiquea Schröder & Treadaway, 1980 (western Py)
Lexias damalis galoa Fruhstorfer, 1898 (Mo)

- Lexias pardalis (Moore, 1878)

Lexias pardalis cavarna Fruhstorfer, 1898 (Bl)
Lexias pardalis ellora Fruhstorfer, 1890 (Mo)
Lexias pardalis tethys Tsukada, 1991 (Pn)

- Lexias dirtea (Fabricius, 1793)

Lexias dirtea palawana Moore, 1897 (Cn, Pn)

- Lexias canescens (Butler, [1869])

Lexias canescens leopardina Fruhstorfer, 1898 (Sulu Archipelago, Jl)

- Lexias satrapes C. Felder & R. Felder, 1861

Lexias satrapes satrapes C. Felder & R. Felder, 1861 (Lz, Mo, Polillo)
Lexias satrapes amlana Jumalon, 1970 (Me, N, western Py)
Lexias satrapes hiwaga Nuyda & Kawamura, 1989 (Camiguin de Lz)
Lexias satrapes ormocana Jumalon, 1970 (Le, Sr)
Lexias satrapes ornata Schröder & Treadaway, 1979 (Sn)
Lexias satrapes trapesa Semper, 1888 (Mi)

- Lexias panopus C. Felder & R. Felder, 1861

Lexias panopus ingae Schröder & Treadaway, 1987 (N, Py)
Lexias panopus miscus Fruhstorfer, 1898 (Mi)
Lexias panopus visayana Schröder & Treadaway, 1987 (Bl, Le, Sr)
Lexias panopus vistrica Fruhstorfer, 1898 (Dt, Homonhon)

genus: Pantoporia

- Pantoporia hordonia (Stoll, 1790)

Pantoporia hordonia doronia Staudinger (Cn, Pn)

- Pantoporia epira C. Felder & R. Felder, 1863

Pantoporia epira epira C. Felder & R. Felder, 1863 (Burias)
Pantoporia epira heliobole Semper, 1878 (eastern & central Mi, Sr)
Pantoporia epira luzonensis Eliot, 1969 (northern Lz)

- Pantoporia paraka (Butler, [1879])

Pantoporia paraka paraka (Butler, [1879]) (Sb)
Pantoporia paraka olanguana Tsukada & Kaneko, 1985 (Bl, Pn)

- Pantoporia dama (Moore, 1858)

Pantoporia dama dama (Moore, 1858) (Catanduanes, Lz, Mq, Me, Mo, N, Py, Sb)
Pantoporia dama athene Staudinger, 1889 (Bl, Cn, Pn)
Pantoporia dama babuyanensis Tsukada & Kaneko, 1985 (Ba)
Pantoporia dama camotesiana Fruhstorfer, 1912 (Ca)
Pantoporia dama commixta Fruhstorfer, 1908 (Bl, Cu, Camiguin de Mi, Dt, Le, Mi, Pnn, Sr)

- Pantoporia cyrilla (C. Felder & R. Felder, 1863)

Pantoporia cyrilla cyrilla (C. Felder & R. Felder, 1863) (Camiguin de Lz, Lz, Polillo)
Pantoporia cyrilla athenais C. Felder & R. Felder, 1863 (Bas, Bl, Cu, Ca, Dt, Homonhon, Jl, Le, Mi, Sr, Sarangani)
Pantoporia cyrilla attica Semper, 1889 (Camiguin de Mi, N, Siquijor)
Pantoporia cyrilla phrygia C. Felder & R. Felder, 1863 (Cn, Mo)
Pantoporia cyrilla shunichii (Tsukada & Kaneko, 1985 (Sng, Sb)

- Pantoporia antara (Moore, 1858)

Pantoporia antara suluana Eliot (Sulu)

genus: Lasippa

- Lasippa bella (Staudinger, 1889)
- Lasippa pata (Moore, 1858)

Lasippa pata pata (Moore, 1858) (Lz, Mq)
Lasippa pata patalina ((Semper, 1892) (Mo)
Lasippa pata semperi (Moore, 1899) (Bl, Dt, Le, eastern Mi, Sr)

- Lasippa illigerella (Staudinger, 1889)
- Lasippa illigera (Eschscholtz, 1821)

Lasippa illigera illigera (Eschscholtz, 1821) (northern & central Lz, Polillo)
Lasippa illigera alabatana Fruhstorfer, 1908 (Alabat, southern Lz, Mq)
Lasippa illigera calayana Fruhstorfer, 1908 (Ba)
Lasippa illigera hegesias Fruhstorfer, 1912 (Gu, N, Py)
Lasippa illigera pia Fruhstorfer, 1908 (Bas)
Lasippa illigera sibuyana Tsukada & Kaneko, 1985 (Sn)

- Lasippa ebusa (C. Felder & R. Felder, 1863)

Lasippa ebusa ebusa (C. Felder & R. Felder, 1863) (Mo)
Lasippa ebusa euphemia Fruhstorfer, 1908 (Jl, Sng, Twi)
Lasippa ebusa laetitia Fruhstorfer, 1908 (Bas, Bl, Camiguin de Mi, Cu, Dt, Homonhon, Letye, Mi, Sr)

- Lasippa pizarrasi M. Okano & T. Okano, 1986
- Lasippa monata (Weyenbergh, 1874)

Lasippa monata sibutuana Tsukada & Kaneko, 1985 (Sb)

genus: Neptis

- Neptis hylas (Linnaeus, 1758)

Neptis hylas sopatra Fruhstorfer, 1907 (Bg, Jl, Sng, Si, Sb, Twi)

- Neptis duryodana Moore, 1858

Neptis duryodana emesa Fruhstorfer, 1908 (Cagayan Sulu, Cy, Pn)
Neptis duryodana mindorica Murayama, 1983 (Mo)

- Neptis cymela C. Felder & R. Felder, 1863

Neptis cymela cymela C. Felder & R. Felder, 1863 (Ba, Lz, Mq, Me, N, Py, Pnn, Polillo, Sn)
Neptis cymela carvinus Fruhstorfer, 1908 (Camiguin de Mi)
Neptis cymela gatanga Fruhstorfer, 1908 (Jl, Sng, Twi)
Neptis cymela nitetis Hewitson, 1868 (Dt, Le, Mi, Sr)
Neptis cymela ormiscus Fruhstorfer 1908 (Bl, Cu)
Neptis cymela prodymus Fruhstorfer, 1908 (Bas)
Neptis cymela samiola Fruhstorfer, 1908 (Mo)

- Neptis sunica Eliot, 1969
- Neptis pampanga C. Felder & R. Felder, 1863

Neptis pampanga pampanga C. Felder & R. Felder, 1863 (Lz, Mq)
Neptis pampanga boholica Moore, 1899 (Bl, Cu, Le, Mi, Sr)
Neptis pampanga dormida Eliot, 1969 (Mo)
Neptis pampanga lizana Fruhstorfer, 1900 (Bas)
Neptis pampanga myleenae Tsukada & Kaneko, 1985 (N, western Py)

- Neptis clinia Moore, 1872

Neptis clinia parthica Fruhstorfer, 1908 (Cy, Dumaran, Pn)
Neptis clinia solygeia Fruhstorfer, 1908 (Jl, Sb)

- Neptis mindorana C. Felder & R. Felder, 1863

Neptis mindorana mindorana C. Felder & R. Felder, 1863 (Cy, Mq, Mo)
Neptis mindorana harpasa Fruhstorfer, 1912 (Bl, Cn, Dumaran, Pn)
Neptis mindorana ilocana C. Felder & R. Felder, 1863 (Ca, Gu, Lz, N, Py, Polillo, Sn, Siquijor)
Neptis mindorana nosba Fruhstorfer, 1912 (Bl, Cu, Ca, Dt, Le, Pnn, Sr)
Neptis mindorana pseudosoma Moore, 1899 (Bas, Camiguin de Mi, Jl, Mi, Siargao)
Neptis mindorana palibothra Fruhstorfer (Bas)

- Neptis felisimilis Schröder & Treadaway, 1983
- Neptis harita Moore, [1875]

Neptis harita palawanica Staudinger, 1889 (Pn)
Neptis harita calamiana Schröder & Treadaway, 1995 (Cn)

- Neptis omeroda Moore, 1874

Neptis omeroda omeroda Moore, 1874 (Sb)
Neptis omeroda occultus Tsukada & Kaneko, 1985 (Bl, Pn)

- Neptis cyra C. Felder & R. Felder, 1863

Neptis cyra cyra C. Felder & R. Felder, 1863 (Lz)
Neptis cyra canlaona Murayama, 1983 (N, Pnn)
Neptis cyra elioti Jumalon, 1975 (Cu)
Neptis cyra vibusa Semper, 1889 (Bl, Dt, Le, Mi, Sr)

- Neptis anjana Moore, 1881

Neptis anjana vidua Staudinger, 1889 (Pn)

genus: Phaedyma

- Phaedyma columella (Cramer, [1780])

Phaedyma columella angara Semper, 1889 (Camiguin de Mi)
Phaedyma columella eremita C. Felder & R. Felder, 1867 (Bl, Catanduanes, Cu, Gu, Lz, Mq, Me, N, Pnn, Romblon, Sn)
Phaedyma columella eumenaia Fruhstorfer, 1912 (Mo)
Phaedyma columella mesogaia Fruhstorfer, 1912 (Le, Mi, Sr)
Phaedyma columella ophianella Staudinger, 1889 (Bl, Cn, Pn)
Phaedyma columella soror Semper, 1889 (Ca)

genus: Dichorragia

- Dichorragia nesimachus (Doyère, [1840])

Dichorragia nesimachus kawamurai Nihira, 1982 (N, Py)
Dichorragia nesimachus leytensis Shimagami, 1990 (Le, Pnn)
Dichorragia nesimachus luzonensis Shimagami, 1990 (Lz, Mo)
Dichorragia nesimachus machates Fruhstorfer, 1898 (Pn)
Dichorragia nesimachus pesistratus Fruhstorfer, 1898 (Mi)
Dichorragia nesimachus samarensis Tsukada, 1991 (northern Sr)

genus: Rohana

- Rohana parisatis (Westwood, [1850])

Rohana parisatis nana Staudinger, 1889 (Pn)

- Rohana rhea (C. Felder & R. Felder, 1863)

Rohana rhea rhea (C. Felder & R. Felder, 1863) (Lz, Mq, Ba)
Rohana rhea babuyana Tsukada, 1991 (Camiguin de Lz)
Rohana rhea danae Fruhstorfer, 1906 (Biliran, Bl, Le, Mi, Pnn, Sr)
Rohana rhea dinagatana Tsukada, 1991 (Dt)
Rohana rhea mindora Fruhstorfer, 1906 (Mo, [Bohol, Le, Siargao (D'A)]
Rohana rhea negrosa Tsukada, 1991 (Cu, N, Py)
Rohana rhea rana Staudinger, 1889 (Pn)
Rohana rhea suluana Tsukada, 1991 (Bg, Sng, Sb, Tawitawi)

genus: Helcyra

- Helcyra miyazakii Tsukada, 1991

genus: Hestinalis

- Hestinalis dissimilis (Hall, 1935)
- Hestinalis waterstradti (Watkins, 1928)

Hestinalis waterstradti waterstradti (Watkins, 1928) (southern Mi)
Hestinalis waterstradti borealis Tsukada, 1991 (northern Mi)

genus: Euripus

- Euripus nyctelius (Doubleday, 1845)

Euripus nyctelius clytia C. Felder & R. Felder, 1867 (Lz)
Euripus nyctelius marinduquanus Treadaway, 1995 (Mq)
Euripus nyctelius nysia Semper, 1887 (Bl, Camiguin de Mi, Le, Mi, Sr)
Euripus nyctelius ophelion Fruhstorfer, 1914 (Bl)
Euripus nyctelius orestheion Fruhstorfer, 1914 (Mo)
Euripus nyctelius palawanicus Fruhstorfer, 1899 (Pn)
Euripus nyctelius sparsus Tsukada, 1991 (N, Py)

genus: Polyura

- Polyura athamas (Drury, [1773])

Polyura athamas kotakaii Hanafusa, 1989 (Camiguin de Lz)
Polyura athamas acuta Rothschild, 1899 (P excluding Bl, Bg, Cn, Camiguin de Lz, Pn, Sng, Sb, Twi, Lz, Mo, Bl, Mi)
Polyura athamas angustior Schröder & Treadaway, 1990
Polyura athamas palawanica Rothschild, 1899 (Cn, Pn)
Polyura athamas uraeus Rothschild, 1899 (Bl)

- Polyura moori (Distant, [1883])

Polyura moori galeoni Schröder & Treadaway, 1990 (Sng, Twi)

- Polyura delphis (Doubleday, 1843)
- Polyura schreiber (Godart, [1824])

Polyura schreiber bilarensis Jumalon, 1975 (Bl, Le, Pnn, Sr)
Polyura schreiber delicatus Tsukada, 1991 (Dt)
Polyura schreiber luzonica Rothschild, 1899 (Lz, Mq, Mo, Batanes)
Polyura schreiber mizunumai Sato & Hanafusa, 1987 (Me, N)
Polyura schreiber praedicta Schröder & Treadaway, 1980 (Pn)
Polyura schreiber toshikoe Sato & Nishiyama, 1987 (Mi)

genus: Charaxes

- Charaxes solon (Fabricius, 1793)

Charaxes solon lampedo (Hübner, [1824]) (Cu, Lz, Mq, Mo, N, Py, Sn)
Charaxes solon orchomenus Fruhstorfer, 1914 (Bl, Cn, Pn)
Charaxes solon shohgun Tsukada, 1991 (Bl, Dt, Le, Mi, Pnn, Sr)
Charaxes solon tindongani Schröder & Treadaway, 1989 (Sng, Sb, Twi)

- Charaxes bajula Staudinger, 1889

Charaxes bajula bajula Staudinger, 1889 (Bl, Cn, Pn)
Charaxes bajula adoracion Schröder & Treadaway, 1989 (Camiguin de Lz, Lz)
Charaxes bajula basilisae Schröder & Treadaway, 1982 (Cu, Py
Charaxes bajula lanitus Tsukada, 1991 (Dt, eastern Mi)
Charaxes bajula remulus Tsukada, 1991 (Mq)

- Charaxes amycus C. Felder & R. Felder, 1861

Charaxes amycus amycus C. Felder & R. Felder, 1861 (Lz, Polillo)
Charaxes amycus basilium Tsukada, 1991 (Dt)
Charaxes amycus bayanii Schröder & Treadaway, 1982 (Mq, N)
Charaxes amycus boholensis Tsukada, 1991 (Bl)
Charaxes amycus carolus Rothschild, 1900 (Mi, Camiguin de Mi)
Charaxes amycus georgius Staudinger, 1892 (Mo)
Charaxes amycus leonido Tsukada, 1991 (northern Sr)
Charaxes amycus leytensis M. Okano & T. Okano, 1986 (Biliran, Le, Pnn)
Charaxes amycus marion Schröder & Treadaway, 1981 (Sn, Romblon group)
Charaxes amycus negrosensis Schröder & Treadaway, 1982 (N)
Charaxes amycus shunichii Hanafusa, 1982 (Camiguin de Lz)
Charaxes amycus theobaldo Schröder & Treadaway, 1982 (Me, western Py)
Charaxes amycus myron Fruhstorfer (Polillo, Gu)

- Charaxes antonius Semper, 1878

Charaxes antonius antonius Semper, 1878 (Mi)
Charaxes antonius dinagatensis Tsukada, 1991 (Dt)
Charaxes antonius osadai Hanafusa, 1985 (Bl, Le, Pnn, Sr)

- Charaxes sangana Schröder & Treadaway, 1988

Charaxes sangana sangana Schröder & Treadaway, 1988 (Sng, Twi)
Charaxes sangana juwaki Schröder & Treadaway, 1988 (Sb)

- Charaxes plateni Staudinger, 1889

Charaxes plateni plateni Staudinger, 1889 (Bl, Pn)
Charaxes plateni latifascia Schröder, Treadaway & Nuyda, 1991 (Cn)

- Charaxes bupalus Staudinger, 1889

Charaxes bupalus bupalus Staudinger, 1889 (Pn)
Charaxes bupalus rowelii Schröder & Treadaway, 1993 (Bl)

- Charaxes harmodius C. Felder & R. Felder, [1867]

Charaxes harmodius harpagon Staudinger, 1889 (Cn, Pn)

genus: Prothoe

- Prothoe franck (Godart, [1824])
- Prothoe semperi Honrath, 1884

Prothoe semperi semperi Honrath, 1884 (Le, central & western Mi, Pnn)
Prothoe semperi boholensis M. Okano & T. Okano, 1989 (Bl)
Prothoe semperi gregalis Tsukada, 1991 (eastern Mi)
Prothoe semperi samarensis Tsukada, 1991 (northern Sr)

- Prothoe plateni Semper, 1892

genus: Agatasa

- Agatasa chrysodonia Staudinger, 1890

Agatasa chrysodonia chrysodonia Staudinger, 1890 (Mi)
Agatasa chrysodonia heterodonia Semper, 1892 (Mo)
Agatasa chrysodonia luzonensis Schröder & Treadaway, 1988 (Lz)
Agatasa chrysodonia mahasthama Fruhstorfer (Pn)

genus: Faunis

- Faunis phaon (Erichson, 1834)

Faunis phaon phaon (Erichson, 1834) (Ba, northern & central Lz, Mq, Polillo)
Faunis phaon pan Schröder & Treadaway, 2003 (central & south Lz)
Faunis phaon carfinia Fruhstorfer, 1911 (Gu, southern Lz, Me, N, Py)
Faunis phaon leucis C. Felder & R. Felder, 1861 (Bas, Mi)
Faunis phaon lurida C. Felder & R. Felder, [1867] (Mo)
Faunis phaon sibuyanensis Aoki & Uémura, 1982 (Sn, Romblon)
Faunis phaon iconion Fruhstorfer

- Faunis stomphax Westwood, 1858

Faunis stomphax plateni Staudinger, 1889 (Pn)

- Faunis sappho Semper, 1878

Faunis sappho sappho Semper, 1878 (Bl)
Faunis sappho ameinokleia Fruhstorfer, 1911 (Camiguin de Mi)
Faunis sappho dinagatensis Aoki & Uémura, 1982 (Dt)
Faunis sappho kleis Semper, 1878 (Ca, Le, Pnn, Sr, Siargao)

genus: Taenaris

- Taenaris horsfieldi (Swainson, [1820])

Taenaris horsfieldi plateni Staudinger, 1889 (Pn)

genus: Discophora

- Discophora sondaica (Boisduval, 1836)

Discophora sondaica semperi Moore, 1895 (eastern & central Mi)
Discophora sondaica camdao Schröder & Treadaway, 1995 (Camiguin de Mi)
Discophora sondaica samarana Schröder & Treadaway, 1995 (Sr)

- Discophora simplex Staudinger, 1889

Discophora simplex simplex Staudinger, 1889 (Cn, Pn)

- Discophora necho C. Felder & R. Felder, [1867]

Discophora necho confluens Schröder & Treadaway, 1989 (Sb)
Discophora necho erasimus Fruhstorfer, 1911 (Jl, Sng, Twi)
Discophora necho guyi Treadaway & Nuyda, 1994 (Sn)
Discophora necho mariebellae Nihira, Nuyda & Kitamura, 1994 (Py)
Discophora necho mindorana Fruhstorfer, 1911 (Mq, Mo
Discophora necho odora Fruhstorfer, 1900 (Cn, Pn)
Discophora necho sahi Treadaway & Nuyda, 1994 (Bl)

- Discophora philippina Moore, 1895
- Discophora ogina (Godart, [1824])

Discophora ogina ogina (Godart, [1824]) (Lz, Mq, Mi, Polillo)
Discophora ogina pulchra Nihira, 1987 (Me, N, Py)

- Discophora dodong Schröder & Treadaway, 1981

genus: Amathusia

- Amathusia phidippus (Linnaeus, 1758)

Amathusia phidippus phidippus (Linnaeus, 1758) (Ba, northern & central Lz, Mq, Polillo)
Amathusia phidippus cebuensis (M. Okano & T. Okano, 1986 (Cu)
Amathusia phidippus negrosensis (M. Okano & T. Okano, 1986 (Me, N, Py, Sn)
Amathusia phidippus pollicaris Butler, 1870 (P excluding Bg, Cu, Me, N, Py, Sng, Sb, Sn, Twi)
Amathusia phidippus palawana Fruhstorfer (Pn)

genus:Amathuxidia

- Amathuxidia amythaon (Doubleday, 1847)

Amathuxidia amythaon negrosensis Schröder & Treadaway, 1980 (N)
Amathuxidia amythaon perinthas Fruhstorfer, 1911 (Mi)
Amathuxidia amythaon philippina Moore, 1895 (Le, Pnn, Sr)

genus: Zeuxidia

- Zeuxidia semperi C. Felder & R. Felder, 1861

Zeuxidia semperi semperi C. Felder & R. Felder, 1861 (Lz, Polillo)
Zeuxidia semperi excelsa Rothschild, 1916 (N)
Zeuxidia semperi therionarca Fruhstorfer, 1911 (Mo)

- Zeuxidia sibulana Honrath, 1884

Zeuxidia sibulana sibulana Honrath, 1884 (eastern & southern Mi)
Zeuxidia sibulana medicieloi Schröder, 1977 (Le, Sr)

- Zeuxidia amethystus Butler, 1865

Zeuxidia amethystus amethystina Stichel, 1906 (Camiguin de Mi, Mi)
Zeuxidia amethystus tawiensis (Schröder & Treadaway, 1991 (Sng, Twi)
Zeuxidia amethystus victrix Staudinger, 1889 (Bl, Pn)

genus: Melanitis

- Melanitis leda (Linnaeus, 1758)
- Melanitis atrax (C. Felder & R. Felder, 1863)

Melanitis atrax atrax (C. Felder & R. Felder, 1863) (Alabat, Ba, Burias, Lz, Mq, Polillo, Sn)
Melanitis atrax bazilana Fruhstorfer, 1908 (Bas)
Melanitis atrax cajetana Semper, 1886 (Bl, Cu, Ca, Le, Sr)
Melanitis atrax elya Fruhstorfer, 1911 (D'A gives spelling as clya) (Jl, Sng, Sb, Twi)
Melanitis atrax erichsonia C. Felder & R. Felder, 1863 (Mo)
Melanitis atrax lucillus Fruhstorfer, 1908 (Camiguin de Mi, Dt, Mi)
Melanitis atrax soloni M. Okano & T. Okano, 1991 (Me, N, Py)

- Melanitis zitenius (Herbst, 1796)

Melanitis zitenius xantophthalmus Staudinger, 1889 (Pn)

- Melanitis boisduvalia (C. Felder & R. Felder, 1863)

Melanitis boisduvalia boisduvalia (C. Felder & R. Felder, 1863) (P excluding Bl, Bas, Pn, Sulu Archipelago, Lz)
Melanitis boisduvalia palawanica Fruhstorfer, 1908 (Bl, Pn)
Melanitis boisduvalia pompeja Fruhstorfer, 1911 (Bas)
Melanitis boisduvalia carales Fruhstorfer (Mo)
Melanitis boisduvalia ernita Fruhstorfer (Mi, Bohol)

- Melanitis phedima (Cramer, [1780])

Melanitis phedima nuwara Fruhstorfer (Lz, Mo)

genus: Elymnias

- Elymnias nesaea (Linnaeus, 1764)

Elymnias nesaea tawicola Schröder & Treadaway, 1989 (Bg, Sng, Sb, Twi)

- Elymnias congruens Semper, 1887

Elymnias congruens congruens Semper, 1887 (Biliran, Catanduanes, Le, Pnn, Sr)
Elymnias congruens endida Fruhstorfer, 1911 (Bl)
Elymnias congruens jekei Schröder & Treadaway, 1989 (central & northern Lz)
Elymnias congruens phaios Fruhstorfer, 1907 (southern Mi)
Elymnias congruens photinus Fruhstorfer, 1907 (northern Mi)
Elymnias congruens rafaela Fruhstorfer, 1907 (Bas)
Elymnias congruens salipi Schröder & Treadaway, 1989 (Sng, Twi)
Elymnias congruens subcongruens Semper, 1892 (southern Lz, Mq, Mo)
Elymnias congruens neergaardorum Schröder & Treadaway, 2003 (Me)

- Elymnias panthera (Fabricius, 1787)

Elymnias panthera suluana Fruhstorfer, 1899 (Cagayan Sulu)

- Elymnias parce Staudinger, 1889

Elymnias parce parce Staudinger, 1889 (Bl, Cn, Dumaran, southern Mo, Pn)
Elymnias parce justini Schröder & Treadaway, 2003 (Busuanga)

- Elymnias dara Distant & Pryer, 1887

Elymnias dara albofasciata Staudinger, 1889 (Bl, Dumaran, Pn)

- Elymnias sansoni Jumalon, 1975
- Elymnias luteofasciata Okubo, 1980
- Elymnias melias C. Felder & R. Felder, 1863

Elymnias melias melias C. Felder & R. Felder, 1863 (Burias, central & southern Lz, Polillo)
Elymnias melias malis Semper, 1887 (northern Lz, Polillo)

- Elymnias beza Hewitson, 1877

Elymnias beza beza Hewitson, 1877 (Mi)
Elymnias beza samarana Schröder & Treadaway, 1980 (Le, Sr)

- Elymnias koch Semper, 1887
- Elymnias casiphonides Semper, 1892

Elymnias casiphonides casiphonides Semper, 1892 (Mi)
Elymnias casiphonides sanrafaela Schröder & Treadaway, 1980 (northern Sr)

- Elymnias kanekoi Tsukada & Nishiyama, 1980
- Elymnias esaca (Westwood, [1851])

Elymnias esaca egialina (C. Felder & R. Felder, 1863) (Ba, north eastern Lz, Mq, northern Mo, Nehros, Py)
Elymnias esaca georgi Fruhstorfer, 1907 (Mi)
Elymnias esaca andrewi Schröder & Treadaway, 2003 (Le, Sr)

genus: Neorina

- Neorina lowii (Doubleday, [1849])

Neorina lowii princesa Staudinger, 1889 (Bl, Pn)

genus: Zethera

- Zethera hestioides C. Felder & R. Felder, 1861
- Zethera pimplea (Erichson, 1834)

Zethera pimplea pimplea (Erichson, 1834) (Ba, Burias, Camiguin de Lz, Lz, Mq, Mo, Polillo)
Zethera pimplea diloris Fruhstorfer

- Zethera musa C. Felder & R. Felder, 1861
- Zethera musides Semper, 1878
- Zethera thermaea Hewitson, 1877

genus: Zophoessa

- Zophoessa dataensis Semper, 1887

genus: Lethe

- Lethe europa (Fabricius, 1775)
- Lethe chandica (Moore, [1858])
- Lethe mekara (Moore, [1858])

genus: Ptychandra

- Ptychandra lorquinii C. Felder & R. Felder, 1861
- Ptychandra ohtanii Hayashi, 1978
- Ptychandra schadenbergi Semper, 1887
- Ptychandra mindorana Semper, 1892
- Ptychandra leucogyne C. Felder & R. Felder, [1867]
- Ptychandra negrosensis Banks, Holloway & Barlow, 1976
- Ptychandra negrosensis angelalcalai Badon & Nuyda, 2020

genus: Orsotriaena

- Orsotriaena medus (Fabricius, 1775)

genus: Mycalesis

- Mycalesis ita C. Felder & R. Felder, 1863
- Mycalesis kashiwaii Aoki & Uémura, 1982
- Mycalesis georgi Aoki & Uémura, 1982
- Mycalesis felderi Butler, 1868
- Mycalesis kurosawai Kashiwai, 1986
- Mycalesis teatus Fruhstorfer, 1911
- Mycalesis treadawayi Schröder, 1986
- Mycalesis tagala C. Felder & R. Felder, 1863
- Mycalesis bisaya C. Felder & R. Felder, 1863
- Mycalesis janardana Moore, [1858]
- Mycalesis perseus (Fabricius, 1775)
- Mycalesis mineus (Linnaeus, 1758)
- Mycalesis horsfieldi (Moore, [1892])
- Mycalesis igoleta C. Felder & R. Felder, 1863
- Mycalesis frederici Aoki & Uémura, 1982
- Mycalesis tamarau Aoki & Uémura, 1982
- Mycalesis orseis Hewitson, [1864]
- Mycalesis aramis Hewitson, 1866

== Lycaenidae ==
genus: Cyaniriodes

- Cyaniriodes libna (Hewitson, 1869)

C. l. miotskushi Hayashi, 1976 (Pn)
C. l. samarana Schröder & Treadaway, 1994 (Sr)
C. l. tawicolana Schröder & Treadaway, 1994 (Twi)

- Cyaniriodes siraspiorum Schröder & Treadaway, 1976

genus: Poritia

- Poritia philota Hewitson, 1874

P. p. glennuydai Schröder & Treadaway, 1989 (central & western Lz)
P. p. mindora Osada, 1994 (Mo)
P. p. phare H. H. Druce, 1895 (Bl, Dt, Le, Mi, N, Pnn, Sr)

- Poritia talophi Hayashi,
- Poritia erycinoides (C. Felder & R. Felder, [1865])

P. e kinoshitai Hayashi, 1976 (Pn)

- Poritia hewitsoni Moore, [1866]

P. h. solitaria Schröder & Treadaway, 1989 (central Lz)

- Poritia phama H. H. Druce, 1895

P. p. palawana Osada, 1994 (Pn)

- Poritia plateni Staudinger, 1889
- Poritia languana Schröder & Treadaway, 1986

genus: Simiskina

- Simiskina phalena (Hewitson, 1874)

S. p. hayashii Schröder & Treadaway, 1979 (Bl, Le, Mi)
S. p. ilagana Osada & Hashimoto, 1987 (north-eastern Mi)
S. p. howarthi Hayashi, 1976 (Pn)

- Simiskina phalia (Hewitson, 1874)

S. p. morishitai Hayashi, 1976 (southern Pn)

- Simiskina pasira Moulton 1911

S. p. pasira Moulton, 1911 (Pn)
S. p. semperi Fruhstorfer, 1919 (Camiguin de Mi)

genus: Poriskina

- Poriskina phakos H. H. Druce, 1895

genus: Deramas

- Deramas bidotata Fruhstorfer, 1914
- Deramas evelynae Schröder & Treadaway, 1978

D. e. evelynae Schröder & Treadaway, 1978 (southern Lz, Mq)
D. e. nahomiae Takanami, 1985 (northern N)
D. e. tsuio Takanami, 1987 (Mo)

- Deramas ikedai Hayashi, 1978
- Deramas mindanensis Eliot, 1964
- Deramas nelvis Eliot, 1964

D. n. manobo Schröder & Treadaway, 1978 (southern Mi (Mt. Apo))
D. n. montana Schröder & Treadaway, 1978 (northern Mi (Mt. Kitanlad)

- Deramas sumikat Schröder & Treadaway, 1986
- Deramas tomokoae Hayashi, 1981
- Deramas toshikoae Hayashi, 1981
- Deramas treadawayi Hayashi, 1981
- Deramas talophi Hayashi,

genus: Liphyra

- Liphyra brassolis Westwood, 1864

L. b. hermelnuydae Schröder & Treadaway, 1988 (Homonhon)
L. b. justini Schröder & Treadaway, 1988 (eastern Lz)

genus: Allotinus

- Allotinus fallax C. Felder & R. Felder, [1865]

A. f. fallax C. Felder & R. Felder, [1865] (Bl, Cu, Le, Lz, Mq, Me, Mo, Py, Sr, Sn)
A. f. aphacus Fruhstorfer, 1898 (Camiguin de Mi, Dt, Homonhon, Mi, Pnn)
A. f. eryximachus Fruhstorfer, 1898 (Mo)
A. f. dotion Fruhstorfer, 1898 (Bas)
A. f. tymphrestus Fruhstorfer, 1916 (Jl, Sb, Twi)

- Allotinus subviolaceus C. Felder & R. Felder, [1865]
- Allotinus punctatus Semper, 1889
- Allotinus nigritus Semper, 1889
- Allotinus kudratus Takanami, 1990
- Allotinus sarrastes Fruhstorfer, 1898
- Allotinus melos H. H. Druce, 1896
- Allotinus samarensis Eliot, 1986

A. s. samarensis Eliot, 1986 (Le, Mi, Sr)

- Allotinus luzonensis Eliot, 1987
- Allotinus albatus C. & R. Felder, [1865]

A. a. mendax Eliot, 1986 (Lz, Mq, Sr)

- Allotinus apries Fruhstorfer, 1913

A. a. ristus Eliot, 1986 (Pn)

- Allotinus corbeti Eliot, 1956
- Allotinus unicolor C. Felder & R. Felder, [1865]

A. u. georgius Fruhstorfer, 1898 (Bl, Mo, Sng, Twi)

- Allotinus nivalis (H. Druce, 1873)

A. n. felderi Semper, 1889 (Homonhon, Le, Lz, Mq, Mi, N, Sr, Sn, Twi)

- Allotinus substrigosus (Moore, 1884)

A. s. ballantinei Eliot, 1986 (Pn)
A. s. yusukei Eliot, 1986 (Mi)

genus: Logania

- Logania malayica Distant, 1884

L. m. subura Fruhstorfer, 1914 (Le, Mi, Sr)

- Logania waltraudae Eliot, 1986
- Logania regina (H. Druce, 1873)

L. r. evora Fruhstorfer, 1916 (Sng, Twi)

- Logania marmorata Moore, 1884

L. m. faustina Fruhstorfer, 1914 (Jl, Le, Mi, Sr, Twi)
L. m. hilaeira Fruhstorfer, 1914 (Cagayan Sulu)
L. m. palawana Fruhstorfer, 1914 (Bl, Cn, Lz, Mq, Pn)
L. m. samosata Fruhstorfer, 1914 (Cu, Mo)

- Logania distanti Semper, 1889

L. d. distanti Semper, 1889 (Cu, Lz, Mi, N, Sr)
L. d. drucei Moulton, 1911 (Bl)

genus: Lontalius

- Lontalius eltus Eliot, 1986

L. e. treadawayi Eliot, 1986

genus: Miletus

- Miletus gopara (de Nicéville, 1890)

M. g. eustatius Fruhstorfer, 1898 (Sng, Sb, Twi)

- Miletus symethus (Cramer, [1777])

M. s. edonus Fruhstorfer, 1898 (Pn)
M. s. hierophantes Fruhstorfer, 1916 (Jl, Mi, Twi)
M. s. phantus Eliot, 1986 (Lz, Mq)
M. s. philopator Fruhstorfer, 1914 (Mo)

- Miletus atimonicus Murayama & Okamura, 1973
- Miletus melanion C. Felder & R. Felder, [1865]

M. m. melanion C. Felder & R. Felder, [1865] (Lz, Mi, N, Pn)
M. m. euphranor Fruhstorfer, 1914 (Le, Mo)

- Miletus bazilanus Fruhstorfer, 1898
- Miletus takanamii Eliot, 1986
- Miletus drucei Semper, 1889

M. d. drucei Semper, 1889 (Bl, Bl, Cu, Lz, Mo, Pn, Sr)

genus: Spalgis

- Spalgis epius (Westwood, [1851])

S. e. semperi Fruhstorfer, 1923
S. e. strigatus Semper, 1889

- Spalgis takanamii Eliot, 1984

genus: Curetis

- Curetis nesophila (C. Felder & R. Felder, 1862)
- Curetis tagalica (C. Felder & R. Felder, 1862)

C. t. tagalica (C. Felder & R. Felder, 1862) (P excluding Bl, Dumaran, Pn, Sb)
C. t. takanamii Schröder & Treadaway, 1979
C. t. palawanica Staudinger, 1889 (Bl, Dumaran, Pn)

genus: Anthene

- Anthene emolus (Godart, [1824])

A. m. modesta Staudinger, 1889 (Lz, Pn)

- Anthene licates (Hewitson, 1874)

A. l. addend Fruhstorfer, 1916 (Sanga, Sanga, Pn)

- Anthene lycaenina (R. Felder, 1868)

A. l. miya Fruhstorfer, 1916 (Pn)
A. l. villosina Fruhstorfer, 1923 (Lz, Mo, Mi)

genus: Niphanda

- Niphanda tessellata Moore, [1875]

N. t. aristarcha Fruhstorfer, 1919 (Lz, Mq, Mi, Sng)

genus: Una

- Una philippensis Schröder & Treadaway, 1979

genus: Nacaduba

- Nacaduba sericina (C. Felder & R. Felder, [1865])

N. s. sericina (C. Felder & R. Felder, [1865]) (Ba, Le, Lz, Mq, Me, Mo, N, Py, Polillo, Sr, Sn)
N. s. palawana Hayashi, 1977 (Pn)
N. s. thaumas Fruhstorfer, 1916 (Bas, Bg, Mi, Sng, Twi)

- Nacaduba angusta (H. Druce, 1873)

N. a. angusta (H. Druce, 1873) (Pn)
N. a. limbura Fruhstorfer, 1916 (P excluding Pn)
N. a. thespia Fruhstorfer (Sulu)

- Nacaduba pactolus (C. Felder, 1860)

N. p. neaira Fruhstorfer, 1916 (Bas, Bl, Lz, Mi, Pn, Pnn, Sr, Twi)

- Nacaduba pavana (Horsfield, [1828])

N. p. asaga Fruhstorfer, 1916
N. p. georgi Fruhstorfer, 1916 (Le, Mi, Sr)

- Nacaduba hermus (C. Felder, 1860)

N. h. tairea Fruhstorfer, 1916 (Bas, Mq, Mi)

- Nacaduba sanaya Fruhstorfer, 1916

N. s. elioti Corbet, 1938 (Twi)
N. s. metallica Fruhstorfer, 1916 (Cu, Le, Lz, Mi)

- Nacaduba berenice (Herrich- Schäffer, 1869)

N. b. zygida Fruhstorfer, 1916 (Bas, Le, Lz, Mi, N, Pn, Twi)

- Nacaduba kurava (Moore, [1858])

N. k. fujikoai Hayashi, 1976 (Lz, Mq, Mi, N, Pn)

- Nacaduba beroe (C. Felder & R. Felder, [1865])

N. b. beroe (C. Felder & R. Felder, [1865]) (Le, Lz, Mq, Mi, N, Pn)
N. b. neon Fruhstorfer (Pn)

- Nacaduba subperusia (Snellen, 1896)

N. s. paska Eliot, 1955 (Jl, Le, Lz, Mq, Mo, Mi, Pn, Sn, Sb)

genus: Prosotas

- Prosotas aluta (H. Druce, 1873)

P. a. philiata Fruhstorfer, 1916 (Bas, Mq, Mi, Pn, Sr, Sng)

- Prosotas maputi (Semper, 1889)
- Prosotas gracilis (Röber, 1886)

P. g. donina Snellen, 1901 (Pn)

- Prosotas nora (C. Felder, 1860)

P. n. semperi Fruhstorfer, 1916 (Bas, Le, Lz, Mq, Mo, Mi, N, Sr)
P. n. superdates Fruhstorfer, 1916 (Pn, Sb)

- Prosotas dubiosa (Semper, [1879])

P. d. lumpura Corbet, 1938 (Lz, Mq, Mi, N)
P. d. subardates Piepers & Snellen, 1918 (Pn)

- Prosotas nelides de Nicéville, 1895

genus: Ionolyce

- Ionolyce helicon (C. Felder, 1860)

I. h. merguiana Moore, 1884 (Pn)

genus: Catopyrops

- Catopyrops ancyra (C. Felder, 1860)

C. a. almora H. Druce, 1873 (Le, Lz, Mq, Mi, Pn, Sb)

genus: Petrelaea

- Petrelaea dana (de Nicéville, [1884])

genus: Caleta

- Caleta roxus (Godart, [1824])

C. r. angustior Staudinger, 1889 (Bg, Cn, Cu, Camiguin de Mi, Dt, Lz, Mq, Me, Mo, Mi, Pn, Py, Sng, Twi)

- Caleta elna (Hewitson, [1876])

C. e. elvira Fruhstorfer, 1918 (Pn)

- Caleta caleta (Hewitson, [1876])

C. c. argola Hewitson, 1876 (Bas, Le, Mi, Sr, Sulu Archipelago)
C. c. gerasa Fruhstorfer, 1918 (Camiguin de Mi)

genus: Discolampa

- Discolampa ethion (Westwood, [1851])

D. e. negrosiana Murayama, 1983 (N, Mt. Canlaon)
D. e. ulysses Staudinger, 1889 (Le, Lz, Mq, Mo, Mi, N, Pn, Sng, Sn, Twi, Ticao)

genus: Danis

- Danis schaeffera (Eschscholtz, 1821)

D. s. schaeffera (Eschscholtz, 1821) (Bl, Bl, Cu, Ca, Lz, Me, Mo, Mi, N, Pn, Sng, Sn, Twi, Ticao)

genus: Jamides

- Jamides bochus (Stoll, 1782)

J. b. georgi Fruhstorfer, 1916 (Le, Mindanan, Sr)
J. b. herodicus Fruhstorfer, 1916 (Catanduanes, Cu, Lz, Me, Mo, N, Py, Sn)
J. b. nabonassar Fruhstorfer, 1916 (Bl, Cn, Pn, Twi)

- Jamides celeno (Cramer, [1775])

J. c. optimus Rothschild, 1886 (Jl, Lz, Mo, Mi, Pn)

- Jamides pura (Moore, 1886)

J. p. eordaea Fruhstorfer, 1916 (Bl, Pn, Sb, Twi)

- Jamides philatus (Snellen, 1878)

J. p. amphyssina Staudinger, 1889 (central & southern P, Bas, Jl, Pn, Sb, Twi)
J. p. osias Röber, 1886 (Lz, Mq, Mo)

- Jamides elpis (Godart, [1824])

J. e. phaliga Fruhstorfer, 1916 (Bas, Mi, Sr, Le)
J. e. pseudelpis Butler, 1879 (Bl, Pn)
J. e. gerra Fruhstorfer (Pn)

- Jamides virgulatus H. H. Druce, 1895
- Jamides alsietus Fruhstorfer, 1916

J. a. alsietus Fruhstorfer, 1916 (Bas, Mi, N)
J. a. camarines Takanami, 1990 (Lz)
J. a. sabatus Fruhstorfer, 1916 (Pn)

- Jamides aratus (Stoll, [1781])

J. a. adana Druce, 1875 (Sb)
J. a. nausiphanes Fruhstorfer, 1916 (Bl, Pn)

- Jamides cunilda Snellen, 1896

J. c. sekii Takanami, 1988 (Pn)

- Jamides alecto (C. Felder, 1860)

J. a. kawazoei Hayashi, 1976) (Pn)
J. a. manilana Toxopeus, 1930) (Catanduanes, Cu, Le, Lz, Mq, Me, Mo, Mi, N, Py, Sr)

- Jamides cyta (Boisduval, 1832)

J. c. natsumiae Hayashi, 1976 (Pn)
J. c. raddatzi Schröder & Treadaway, 1984 (Camiguin de Lz, Le, Lz, Mq, Mi, N, Py, Sr, Sng, Sn, Twi)
J. c. koenigswarteri Schröder, Treadaway & Nuyda, 1993 (Mo)

- Jamides cleodus C. Felder & R. Felder, [1865]

J. c. cleodus C. Felder & R. Felder, [1865] (Lz, N, Sn)
J. c. itumunus Treadaway & Nuyda, 1995 (Homonhon)
J. c. manias Fruhstorfer, 1916 (Le, Mi, Sr)
J. c. potidalon Fruhstorfer, 1916 (Bas, Jl, Sng)
J. c. semperi Fruhstorfer, 1916 (Mo)
J. c. trichonis Fruhstorfer, 1916 (Bl, Pn)

- Jamides schatzi Röber, 1886

J. s. jumaloni Hayashi, 1976 (Pn)
J. s. nakamotoi Hayashi, 1977 (Cu, Le, Lz, Mq, Me, south-eastern Mi, N, Py, Sn)

- Jamides suidas C. Felder & R. Felder, [1865]

J. s. suidas C. Felder & R. Felder, [1865] (Ba, Bl, Le, Lz, Mq, Mo, Mi, Sn, Polillo)

- Jamides aritai Hayashi, [1977]

J. a. aritai Hayashi, 1976 (Pn)
J. a. mindanensis Hayashi, 1977 (Lz, Masnate, Mi, N, Py)

- Jamides callistus Röber, 1886

J. c. callistus Röber, 1886 (Lz, Mq, Sn)
J. c. amastris Fruhstorfer, 1916 (Le, Mi)
J. c. cleitus Fruhstorfer, 1916 (Bas)
J. c. mioae Hayashi, 1976 (Cn, Pn, Sb)
J. c. neaethus Fruhstorfer, 1916 (Mo, Pn)

genus: Catochrysops

- Catochrysops strabo (Fabricius, 1793)

C. s. luzonensis Tite, 1959 (Bl, Bas, Bl, Dt, Dumaran, Jl, Le, Lz, Me, Mo, Mi, Pn, Py, Sr)

- Catochrysops panormus (C. Felder, 1860)

C. p. exiguus Distant, 1886 (Bl, Mi, Pn, Sb, Twi)

genus: Lampides

- Lampides boeticus (Linnaeus, 1767) (P generally)

genus: Leptotes

- Leptotes plinius (Fabricius, 1793)

L. p. leopardus Schultze, 1910 (Le, Lz, Mi (Surigao, South Cotabato))

genus: Castalius

- Castalius rosimon (Fabricius, 1775)

C. r. monrosi Semper, 1889 (Lz, Sr)

genus: Tarucus

- Tarucus waterstradti H. H. Druce, 1895

T. w. simillimus Schröder & Treadaway, 1985 (Mi (Surigao))

genus: Zizeeria

- Zizeeria karsandra (Moore, 1865) (Jl, Lz, Mi, Pn)
- Pseudozizeeria maha Kollar, 1848

P. m. okinawana Matsumura, 1929 (northern Lz)

genus: Zizina

- Zizina otis (Fabricius, 1787)

Z. o. otis (Fabricius, 1787) (Bl, Cebe, Jl, Le, Lz, Mi, Pn)

genus: Zizula

- Zizula hylax (Fabricius, 1775) (Le, Lz, Mq, Pn, Sb, Twi, Mo, Py, probably P generally)

genus: Famegana

- Famegana alsulus (Herrich-Schäffer, 1869) (Lz)

genus: Everes

- Everes lacturnus (Godart, [1824])

E. l. lacturnus (Godart, [1824]) (Lz, Mi, Pn, Twi)

genus: Pithecops

- Pithecops corvus Fruhstorfer, [1919]

P. c. corax Fruhstorfer (Bas, Bl, Le, Lz, Mq, Me, Mo, Mi, Pn, Py, Pnn, Sr, Sng, Sn)

genus: Neopithecops

- Neopithecops zalmora (Butler, 1870)

N. z. zalmora (Butler, 1870) (Lz, Cu, Le, Lz, Pn)

- Neopithecops iolanthe Eliot & Kawazoé, 1983

N. i. boholicus Eliot & Kawazoé, 1983 (Bl)

genus: Megisba

- Megisba malaya (Horsfield, 1828)

M. m. sikkima Moore, 1884 (Bl, Le, Lz, Mq, Me, Mo, Mi, N, Pn, Py, Sr, Sn, Sb, Twi)

genus: Cebrella

- Cebrella penelope Eliot & Kawazoé, 1983

C. p. penelope Eliot & Kawazoé, 1983 (northern, north- eastern & southern Mi (Mt. Apo, Mt. Kitanlad, Agusan))
C. p. kashiwaii Eliot & Kawazoé, 1983 (western Py)

genus: Lestranicus

- Lestranicus yoshidai Eliot & Kawazoé, 1983 (Mi)

genus: Udara

- Udara dilecta (Moore, 1879)

U. d. dilecta Moore, 1879 (Mi)
U. d. paracatius Fruhstorfer, 1917 (northern Mo)

- Udara placidula (H. H. Druce, 1895)

U. p. placidula (H. H. Druce, 1895) (northern Mi)
U. p. kawazowei Hayashi, 1976 (Lz, Mi, Pn)

- Udara cyma (Toxopeus, 1927)

U. c. elioti Hayashi, 1976 (Pn)

- Udara camenae (de Nicéville, 1895)

U. c. filipina Murayama & Okamura, 1973 (Lz, Mo, Mi)

- Udara dilectissima (H. H. Druce, 1895)

U. d. luzona Eliot & Kawazoé, 1983 (Lz, Mq, Mi)

- Udara selma (H. H. Druce, 1895)

U. s. arsina (Fruhstorfer, 1922) (Mo)
U. s. mindanensis Eliot & Kawazoé, 1983 (Mi, N, Pn)

- Udara santotomasana Eliot & Kawazoé, 1983

U. s. santotomasana Eliot & Kawazoé, 1983 (central & northern Lz, northern Mo)
U. s. subpura Eliot & Kawazoé, 1983 (southern Mi, Mt. Apo)

- Udara aemulus Eliot & Kawazoé, 1983 (southern Mi, Mt. Apo)
- Udara wilemani Eliot & Kawazoé, 1983 (northern Lz)
- Udara nishiyamai Eliot & Kawazoé, 1983 (southern Mi, Mt. Apo)
- Udara tyotaroi Eliot & Kawazoé, 1983 (southern Mi, Mt. Apo)

genus: Sidima

- Sidima murayamai Eliot & Kawazoé, 1983 (northern Mi (Misamis))

genus: Acytolepis

- Acytolepis puspa (Horsfield, [1828])

A. p. bazilana (Fruhstorfer, 1910) (Bas, Camiguin de Mi, Jl, Le, Mi, Sr, Twi, Mo)
A. p. cagaya (C. Felder & R. Felder, [1865]) (Lz, Mo, Pn)

genus: Celarchus

- Celarchus archagathos (Fruhstorfer, 1910)

C. a archagathos (Fruhstorfer, 1910) (Bas, Camiguin de Mi, Mi)
C. a. leytensis Eliot & Kawazoé, 1983 (southern Le)

- Celarchus hermarchus (Fruhstorfer, 1910)

C. h. hermarchus (Fruhstorfer, 1910) (Lz, Mq, Me N)
C. h. vesontia (Fruhstorfer, 1917) (Le, Mo, Romblon, Sr, Sn)

genus: Celastrina

- Celastrina argiolus (Linnaeus, 1758)

C. a sugurui Eliot & Kawazoé, 1983 (northern Lz)

- Celastrina philippina (Semper, 1889)

C. p. philippina (Semper, 1889) (Ca, Lz, Me, Mi, N, Py)

- Celastrina algernoni (Fruhstorfer, 1917)

C. a. algernoni (Fruhstorfer, 1917) (Le, Lz, Mi)
C. a. kadazanensis Barlow, Banks & Holloway, 1971 (Pn)

- Celastrina lavendularis (Moore, 1877)

C. l. hermesianax Fruhstorfer, 1910 (Le, Lz, Me, Mo, Mi, N)

genus: Callenya

- Callenya kaguya Eliot & Kawazoé, 1983 (Pn)

genus: Monodontides

- Monodontides apona (Fruhstorfer, 1910) (southern Mi, Mt. Apo)
- Monodontides luzonensis Eliot & Kawazoé, 1983 (northern Lz, northern Mo)
- Monodontides kolari (Ribbe, 1926) (Mi)
- Monodontides hondai Eliot & Kawazoé, 1983 (Lz, Me, Mo, Mi, N, Pn, Py)

genus: Euchrysops

- Euchrysops cnejus (Fabricius, 1798)

E. c. cnejus (Fabricius, 1798) (Cue, Le, Lz, Pn, Twi)

genus: Chilades

- Chilades lajus (Stoll, [1780])

C. l. athena (C. Felder & R. Felder, [1865]) (Bl, Homonhna, Le, Mi, Pn, Sr, Twi)

- Chilades parrhasius (Fabricius, 1793) (Bl, Ca, Le, Lz, Mi)

genus: Luthrodes

- Luthrodes mindora (C. Felder & R. Felder, [1865]) (Bg, Cn, Cu, Camiguin de Lz, Homonhon, Le, Lz, Mq, Me, Mo, Mi, Pn, Sr, Sng, Twi, Ticao)
- Luthrodes pandava (Horsfield, [1829])

L. p. vapanda (Semper, 1890) (Lz)

genus: Freyeria

- Freyeria trochylus (Freyer, 1845)

F. t. gnoma (Snellen, 1876) (Lz)
F. t. putli Kollar (P)

genus: Cigaritis

- Cigaritis syama (Horsfield, [1829])

C. s. negrita (C. Felder, 1862) (Bl, Cu, Camiguin de Lz, Ca, Le, Lz, Mq, Me, Mo, Mi, N, Py, Polillo, Sr)

genus: Austrozephyrus

- Austrozephyrus reginae Schröder & Treadaway, 1982 (southern Pn)

genus: Arhopala

- Arhopala anthelus (Westwood, [1851])

A. a. impar Evans, 1957 (Mo)
A. a. marinduquensis Hayashi, Schröder & Treadaway, 1984 (Mq)
A. a. paradisii Schröder & Treadaway, 1990 (Dt)
A. a. reverie Seki, 1994 (Py)
A. a. sanmariana Osada & Hashimoto, 1987 (north-eastern Lz)
A. a. saturatior Staudinger, 1889 (Pn)
A. a. sotades Fruhstorfer, 1914 (Bohol, Le, southern Lz, Mi, Sr)

- Arhopala nakamotoi Hayashi, 1978 (Mi)
- Arhopala eridanus (C. Felder, 1860)

A. e. dilutior Staudinger, 1889 (Bl, Cy, Pn)

- Arhopala anarte (Hewitson, 1862) (Pn)
- Arhopala trionoea Semper, 1890 (Le, Lz, Mq, Mi, Sr)
- Arhopala alexandrae Schröder & Treadaway, 1978 (Mi, Bohol, Py, Lz, Mq)
- Arhopala annulata (C. Felder, 1860)

A. a. annulata (C. Felder, 1860) (Mi, Pn)

- Arhopala aedias (Hewitson, 1862)

A. a. agnis C. Felder & R. Felder, [1865] (Sb)
A. a. oenotria (Hewitson, 1869) (Cu, Le, Lz, Mo, Mi, Pn)

- Arhopala sakaguchii Hayashi, 1981 (N)
- Arhopala myrzala (Hewitson, 1869)

A. m. myrzala (Hewitson, 1869) (Lz, Mi)

- Arhopala allata (Staudinger, 1889)

A. a. allata (Staudinger, 1889) (Pn, Mi)
A. a. pambihira Takanami, 1982 (Lz, Mi, Sr, north-eastern Mi)

- Arhopala atosia (Hewitson, [1863])

A. a. aricia (Staudinger, 1889) (Pn)

- Arhopala agesilaus (Staudinger, 1889)

A. a. agesilaus (Staudinger, 1889) (Pn)
A. a. philippa Evans, 1957 (Bl, Le, Mo, Mi)

- Arhopala major (Staudinger, 1889) (Lz, Pn)
- Arhopala amphimuta (C. Felder, 1860)

A. a. amphimuta (C. Felder, 1860) (Lz, Pn)

- Arhopala hesba (Hewitson, 1869) (Bl, Le, Mo, Mi, Sr)
- Arhopala anamuta Semper, 1890 (Mo, Mi)
- Arhopala luzonensis Takanami & Ballantine, 1987 (north-eastern & south-eastern Lz)
- Arhopala grandimuta Seki, 1993

A. g. grandimuta Seki, 1993 (Le)
A. g. takanamii Seki, 1993 (Mi)

- Arhopala agesias (Hewitson, 1862) (P)
- Arhopala abseus (Hewitson, 1862)

A. a. abseus (Hewitson, 1862) (Bg, Cn, Pn, Twi)
A. a. amphaea C. Felder & R. Felder, [1865] (Bas, Bl, Camiguin de Lz, Lz, Mq, Mo, Mi, N, Pnn, Sr)

- Arhopala theba (Hewitson, 1863) (Le, Lz, Mq, Mo, Mi)
- Arhopala matsutaroi Hayashi, 1979 (northern, central, southern & south-eastern Mi)
- Arhopala aronya (Hewitson, 1869) (Mi)

A. a. aronya (Hewitson, 1869) (Dt, Le, Lz, Mq, Mo, Mi)
A. a. natsumiae Hayashi, 1981 (N)

- Arhopala cleander (C. Felder, 1860)

A. c. malayica Bethune-Baker, 1903 (Camiguin de Lz, Le, Lz, Mi, N, Sb)

- Arhopala athada (Staudinger, 1889)

A. a. wilemani Evans, 1957 (Mi)

- Arhopala rudepoema Seki, 1994 (Le, Mq, Mo, Mi, N, Pn)
- Arhopala silhetensis (Hewitson, 1862)

A. s. philippina Hayashi, 1981 (Le, Lz, Mq, Mo, Mi, N)
A. s. malayica Bethune-Baker (P)

- Arhopala zambra Swinhoe, [1911]

A. z. kitamurai Seki, 1994 (Mo)
A. z plateni Evans, 1957 (Le, Mi)
A. z. triviata Seki, 1994 (N)

- Arhopala agrata de Nicéville, 1890

A. a. shiorzui Hayashi, 1976 (Pn)

- Arhopala evansi Corbet, 1941 (Sb)
- Arhopala aroa (Hewitson, [1863])

A. a. aroa Hewitson, 1863 (Bas)

- Arhopala selta (Hewitson, 1869)

A. s.hislopi Eliot, 1962 (Twi)

- Arhopala phaenops (C. Felder & R. Felder, [1865])

A. p. phaenops (C. Felder & R. Felder, [1865]) (Bl, Camiguin de Lz, Camiguin de Mi, Lz, Mo, Mi)
A. p. detrita (Staudinger, 1889) (Pn)
A. p. sandakani Bethune-Baker, 1896 (Twi)
A. p. termerion Fruhstorfer, 1914 (Bas)

- Arhopala sublustris Bethune-Baker, 1904

A. s. sublustris Bethune-Baker, 1904 (Twi)

- Arhopala alitaeus (Hewitson, 1862)

A. a. mindanaensis Bethune-Baker, 1904 (Le, Mi, Pnn, Sr)
A. a. myrtale (Staudinger, 1889) (Pn)
A. a. shigae Murayama & Okamura, 1973 (Ba, Bl, Lz, Mq, N, Sn)
A. a. zilensis Fruhstorfer, 1914 (Bas)
A. a. panta Evans (P)

- Arhopala myrtha (Staudinger, 1889) (Pn)
- Arhopala tephlis (Hewitson, 1869)

A. t. unnoi Hayashi, 1976 (Ba, Bl, Cn, Cu, Lz, Mi, Pn, Sr, Sn)

- Arhopala bazalus (Hewitson, 1862)

A. b. asagiae Hayashi, 1978 (Mi)

- Arhopala horsfieldi (Pagenstecher, 1890)

A. h. palawanica Hayashi, 1976 (Pn)

- Arhopala eumolphus (Cramer, [1780])

A. e. aristomachus Fruhstorfer, 1914 (Pn)

- Arhopala staudingeri Semper, 1890

A. s. staudingeri Semper, 1890 (Bl, Le, Mi, Pnn, Sr)
A. s. castagnedai Osada & Hashimoto, 1987 (Lz)
A. s. negrosiana Hayashi, 1981 (N)

- Arhopala chamaeleona Bethune-Baker 1903

A. c. maputi Takanami, 1984 (Lz, Mq, Mo)
A. c. mizunumai Hayashi, 1978 (Dt, Le, Mi, N, Pnn, Sr)

- Arhopala tindongani Nuyda & Takanami, 1990 (northern Lz)
- Arhopala corinda (Hewitson, 1869)

A. c. corinda (Hewitson, 1869) (Ba, Cy, Dt, Dumaran, Homonhon, Le, Lz, Mq, Me, Mo, Mi, N, Sr, Sb)

- Arhopala agaba (Hewitson, 1862) (Mi)
- Arhopala pseudocentaurus (Doubleday, 1847)

A. p. aglais (C. Felder & R. Felder, [1865]) (Ba, Cy, Dt, Dumaran, Homonhon, Le, Lz, Mq, Me, Mo, Mi, Polillo, Sr, Sn, Twi)

- Arhopala buddha Bethune-Baker, 1903

A. b. cooperi Evans, 1925 (P)

- Arhopala ocrida (Hewitson, 1869)

A. o. ocrida (Hewitson, 1869) (Bl, Le, Lz, Mi, Sr, Sn, Twi)
A. o. cionii Schröder & Treadaway, 1994 (Sng, Twi)

- Arhopala hinigugma Takanami, 1985 (Le, Lz, Mi, N)
- Arhopala alesia (C. Felder & R. Felder, 1862)

A. a. alesia (C. Felder & R. Felder, 1862) (Le, Lz, Mq, Mo, Mi, Twi)
A. a. mio Hayashi, 1981 (N)

- Arhopala alaconia (Hewitson, 1869)

A. a. oberthueri Staudinger, 1889 (Pn)

- Arhopala ilocana Osada & Hashimoto, 1987 (northern Lz)
- Arhopala arsenius (C. Felder & R. Felder, [1865]) (Lz, Mo)

A. a. arsenius (C. Felder & R. Felder, [1865]) (Lz, N)
A. a. everetti Evans, 1957 (Mo)

- Arhopala epimete (Staudinger, 1889)

A. e. epimete Staudinger, 1889 (Pn)
A. e. magindana Odasa, 1987 (north-eastern Mi)

- Arhopala inornata (C. Felder & R. Felder, 1860)

A. i. inornata C. Felder & R. Felder, 1860 (P)

- Arhopala avatha de Nicéville, 1896

A. a. avatha de Nicéville, 1896 (Twi)
A. a. lana Evans, 1957 (Mi, Py)

- Arhopala davaona Semper, 1890 (Mi)
- Arhopala fulla (Hewitson, 1862)

A. f. santa Evans, 1957 (Lz, Mq, Mo, Mi)

- Arhopala paraganesa (de Nicéville, 1882)

A. p. tomokoae Hayashi, 1976 (Pn)

- Arhopala birmana Moore, 1884

A. b. hiurai Hayashi, 1976 (Pn)

- Arhopala schroederi Hayashi, 1981 (Pn)

genus: Flos

- Flos diardi (Hewitson, 1862)

F. d. capeta Hewitson, 1878 (Le, Lz, Mq, Me, Mo, Mi, N, Pn, Sr, Sng, Sb, Tawi-atwi)

- Flos fulgida (Hewitson, [1863])

F. f. zilana Fruhstorfer, 1900 (Bas, Bl, Mo, Mi)

- Flos anniella (Hewitson, 1862)

F. a. anniella (Hewitson, 1862) (Le, Lz, Mq, Mo, Mi, N, Pn)

- Flos apidanus (Cramer, [1777])

F. a. himna Fruhstorfer, 1914 (Mi)
F. a. palawanus Staudinger, 1889 (Bl, Bl, Lz, Mo, Pn, Py, Sr)
F. a. saturatus Snellen, 1890

- Flos iriya Fruhstorfer, 1914 endemic (Bas, Lz, Mo, Mi, Py)
- Flos morphina (Distant, 1884)

F. m. morphina (Distant, 1884) (Pn)

- Flos setsuroi Hayashi, 1981 (Mq, Mo)

genus: Surendra

- Surendra manilana (C. Felder & R. Felder, 1862) endemic

S. m. manilana (C. Felder & R. Felder, 1862) (Lz, Mq, Mo, Mi, N, Py)
S. m. johnelioti Schröder & Treadaway, 1993 (Bg)

- Surendra vivarna (Horsfield, [1829])

S. v. palowana Staudinger, 1889 (Bl, Cn, Pn)

genus: Semanga

- Semanga superba (H. Druce, 1873)

S. s. superba (H. Druce, 1873) (Sng)

genus: Amblypodia

- Amblypodia narada (Horsfield, [1828])

A. n. erichsonii Felder, 1865 (Bas, Bl, Cu, Le, Lz, Mq, Mo, N, Pn, Twi)
A. n. sibutensis Treadaway & Nuyda, 1993 (Sb)
A. n. plateni Riley, 1922 (Mi)

genus: Iraota

- Iraota rochana (Horsfield, [1829])

I. r. austrosuluensis Schröder & Treadaway, 1989 (Bg, Sng, Twi)
I. r. boudanti Treadaway & Nuyda, 1993 (Sb)
I. r. indalawanae Schröder & Treadaway, 1993 (Bl)
I. r. garzoni Schröder & Treadaway, 1986 (N)
I. r. lazarena C. Felder & R. Felder, 1862 (Ba, Bl, Cu, Dt, Le, Lz, Mq, Mo, Mi, Pnn, Sr)
I. r. ottonis Fruhstorfer, 1907 (Cn, Pn)
I. r. boholica Fruhstorfer (Bli)

genus: Catapaecilma

- Catapaecilma gracilis Semper, 1890 (Bl, Cu, Le, Lz, Mo, Mi, Pnn, Sr) endemic
- Catapaecilma nakamotoi Hayashi, 1979 (eastern Mi)
- Catapaecilma evansi Pendlebury, 1933

C. e. evansi Pendlebury, 1933 (Pn)
C. e. parva Schröder & Treadaway, 1988 (northern N)
C. e. rizali Takanami, 1984 (Camiguin de Lz, Lz, Mq, Mo)

- Catapaecilma nuydai Takanami, 1984 (Mi (Bukidnon))

genus: Hypothecla

- Hypothecla astyla (C. Felder & R. Felder, 1862)

H. a. astyala (C. Felder & R. Felder, 1862) (Lz, Mq, Mo)
H. a. mindanaensis Fruhstorfer, 1912 (Biliran, Bl, Cu, Le, Mi, Pnn, Sr)
H. a. palawensis Hayashi, 1976 (Pn)
H. a. tegea Fruhstorfer, 1912 (Bas)

genus: Loxura

- Loxura cassiopeia Distant, 1884

L. c. owadai Hayashi, 1977 (Cu, Mi)
L. c. yilma Fruhstorfer, 1926 (Pn, Mi)
L. c. amatica (Pn)

- Loxura atymnus (Stoll, [1780])

L. a. luzonica Swinhoe, 1917 (Lz)

genus: Eooxylides

- Eooxylides tharis (Geyer, 1837)

E. t. tharisides Fruhstorfer, 1904 (Bl)

- Eooxylides meduana (Hewitson, 1869) endemic (Bl, Cu, Dt, Le, Mi, Pnn, Sr)
- Eooxylides etias (Distant & Pryer, 1887)

E. e. shahaniae Treadaway & Nuyda, 1994 (Bas)

genus: Drina

- Drina discophora (C. Felder & R. Felder, 1862) endemic (Alabat, Batanes, Lz, Mq, Mo)
- Drina mavortia (Hewitson, 1869) endemic (Bl, Cu, Le, Mi, Sr)
- Drina borromeorum Schröder & Treadaway, 1991 endemic (Twi)

genus: Horaga

- Horaga lefebvrei (C. Felder & R. Felder, 1862) endemic

H. l. lefebvrei (C. Felder & R. Felder, 1862) (Lz)
H. l. osma Fruhstorfer, 1912 (Bl, Le, Mi, N, Pnn, Sr)
H. l. osmana Cowan, 1966 (Mo)

- Horaga chalcedonyx Fruhstorfer, 1914
- Horaga natsumiae Hayashi, 1984 endemic (Camiguin de Lz, Le, Mq, Mo, Mi, N)
- Horaga bilineata Semper, 1890 endemic (Camiguin de Lz, Le, Lz, Mq, Mo, Mi, N, Pnn, Pn)
- Horaga albimacula (Wood-Mason & de Nicéville, 1881)

H. a. anytus Staudinger, 1889 (Pn)

- Horaga syrinx (C. Felder, 1860)

H. s. ashinica Murayama & Okamura, 1973 (Bl, Camiguin de Lz, Le, Lz, Mq, Me, Mo, Mi, N, Py, Pnn, Sn, Siquijor)
H. s. camiguina Semper, 1890 (Camiguin de Mi)
H. s. decolor Staudinger, 1889 (Pn)
H. s. joloana Fruhstorfer, 1912 (Jl, Sb, Twi)
H. s. paulla Fruhstorfer, 1912 (Bas)

- Horaga amethysta H. H. Druce, [1903]

H. a. sibutuensis Schröder & Treadaway, 1990 (Sb)

genus: Cheritra

- Cheritra aenea Semper, 1890 endemic (Mo)
- Cheritra orpheus (C. Felder & R. Felder, [1865])

C. o. orpheus (C. Felder & R. Felder, [1865]) (Lz, Mq, Mo, N, Ticao)
C. o. eurydice Fruhstorfer, 1912 (Cn, Pn)
C. o. orphnine Cowan, 1967 (Le, Mi, Sri)

genus: Ritra

- Ritra aurea (H. Druce, 1873)

R. a. aurea (H. Druce, 1873) (Bl, Pn)

genus: Drupadia

- Drupadia hayashii Schröder & Treadaway, 1989 (Sb)
- Drupadia ravindra (Horsfield, [1828])

D. r. balabacola Schröder & Treadaway, 1989 (Bl)
D. r. joloana Staudinger, 1889 (Jl, Sng, Sb, Twi)
D. r. okurai M. Okano & T. Okano, 1991 (Mi)
D. r. ravindrina Staudinger, 1889 (Pn, Balabac)
D. r. resoluta Cowan, 1974 (Lz, Mo, Polilloi)

- Drupadia rufotaenia (Fruhstorfer, [1912])

D. r. praecox Cowan, 1974 (Mo)
D. r. torquata Cowan, 1974 (Bl, Pn)

- Drupadia theda (C. Felder & R. Felder, 1862)

D. t. theda C. Felder & R. Felder, 1862) (Lz, Mq, Me, Py (Mo, Cu, Mi)
D. t. miyo Takanami, 1987 (Mo)
D. t. osadai Takanami, 1987 (Bl)
D. t. pekas Takanami, 1982 (Le, north-eastern Mi, Pnn, Sr)
D. t. tawiensis Schröder & Treadaway, 1989 (Sng, Tawitawi)
D. t. unicolor Staudinger, 1889 (Pni)

- Drupadia niasica (Röber, 1886)

D. n. florens Cowan, 1974 (Le, Mi, Pn)
D. n. natinus Takanami, 1987 (Mo)
D. n. thaenia H. H. Druce, 1895 (Jl)

genus: Pratapa

- Pratapa ismaeli Schröder & Treadaway, 1983 endemic (northern & southern Mi (Mt. Apo, Mt. Kitanlad))
- Pratapa tyotaroi Hayashi, 1981

P. t. tyotaroi Hayashi, 1981 (Mq)
P. t. mindorensis Tsukada & Nishiyama, 1995 (Mo)

- Pratapa icetoides (Elwes, [1893])

P. i. marikit Schröder & Treadaway, 1986 (Dumaran, Pn)

- Pratapa deva (Moore, [1858])

P. d. devana H. H. Druce, 1895 (Lz, Mi)

genus: Tajuria

- Tajuria igolotiana Murayama & Okamura, 1973 endemic

T. i. igolotiana Murayama & Okamura, 1973 (Lz)
T. i. fumiae Hayashi, 1984 (Mi)

- Tajuria deudorix (Hewitson, 1869)

T. d. deudorix (Hewitson, 1869) (Le, Mi)
T. d. primitivoi Osada, 1987 (Bl)
T. d. yuhkichii Hayashi, 1984 (Pn)
T. d. zoletai Osada, 1987 (Camiguin de Lz, Lz, Mq, Mo)

- Tajuria alangani Schröder, Treadaway & Nuyda, 1993 endemic (Mo)
- Tajuria mantra (C. Felder & R. Felder, 1860)

T. m. mantra (C. Felder & R. Felder, 1860) (Pn)
T. m. kimia Treadaway & Nuyda, 1995 (Sng)
T. m. lucrosa Fruhstorfer, 1912 (Bl, Le, north(eastern Mi, N, Pnn, Sr)
T. m. vergara Semper, 1890 (Mi excluding north-eastern)

- Tajuria isaeus (Hewitson, [1865])

T. i. isaeus (Hewitson, [1865]) (Pn)

- Tajuria berenis H. H. Druce, 1896

T. b. berenis H. H. Druce, 1896 (Mi)

- Tajuria dominus H. H. Druce, 1895

T. d. dominus H. H. Druce, 1895 (Dumaran, Pn)

- Tajuria matsutaroi Hayashi, 1984 (Le, southern Mi (Mt. Apo))
- Tajuria mizunumai Hayashi, 1978 (southern Mi (Mt. Apo))
- Tajuria jalajala (C. Felder, 1862)

T. j. jalajala (C. Felder, 1862) (Bl, Camiguin de Mi, Le, Lz, Mq, Me, Mo, Mi, N, Py, Pnn, Polillo, Sr)
T. j. steffi Hayashi, Schröder & Treadaway, 1988 (Homonhon)

genus: Matsutaroa

- Matsutaroa iljai Hayashi, Schröder & Treadaway, 1988 (Me, northern N, western Py)

genus: Dacalana

- Dacalana sannio H. H. Druce, 1895

D. s. sannio H. H. Druce, 1895 (Mi, Sulu Archipelago)
D. s. lucillae Hayashi, Schröder & Treadaway, 1983 (Lz)

- Dacalana aristarchus Fruhstorfer, 1912 endemic (Bas, Mi)
- Dacalana kurosawai Hayashi, 1976 (Cn, Pn)
- Dacalana monaspona Schröder & Treadaway, 1978 endemic

D. m. monaspona Schröder & Treadaway, 1978 (Mi [Mt. Apo]))
D. m. marinduquensis Hayashi, Schröder & Treadaway, 1983 (Lz, Mq, Mo)

- Dacalana akayamai Hayashi, Schröder & Treadaway, 1983 (Mi)
- Dacalana liaoi Hayashi, Schröder & Treadaway, 1983 (N, Py)
- Dacalana irmae Hayashi, Schröder & Treadaway, 1983 (Sn)
- Dacalana mio Hayashi, Schröder & Treadaway, 1983 (Mi)
- Dacalana polyorketes Fruhstorfer, 1912 endemic

D. p. polyorketes Fruhstorfer, 1912 (Le, Mi, Pnn, Sr)
D. p. kawamurai Takanami, 1988 (Sng)
D. p. laduanae Schröder & Treadaway, 1989 (Homonhon)

- Dacalana treadawayi Hayashi, 1984 (Mi)

genus: Neocheritra

- Neocheritra manata Semper, 1890 endemic

N. m. manata Semper, 1890 (Mi (Surigao & South Cotabato))
N. m. gertrudes Schröder & Treadaway, 1978 (southern Mi (Mt. Apo))

genus: Manto

- Manto hypoleuca (Hewitson, [1865])

M. h. martina (Hewitson, 1869) (Bl, Pn)

genus: Paruparo

- Paruparo mamertina (Hewitson, 1869) endemic

P. m. mamertina (Hewitson, 1869) (eastern, southern & central Mi)
P. m. jeanhooperae Schroder & Treadaway, 1988 (Homonhon, northern Sr)
P. m. rahmani (Jumalon, 1975) (southern Le)

- Paruparo cebuensis (Jumalon, 1975)

P. c. cebuensis (Jumalon, 1975) (Cu)
P. c. amethystina Schröder & Treadaway, 1988 (Homonhon)
P. c. chotaroi (Hayashi, 1977) (north-eastern Mi)
P. c. medicieloi M. Okano & T. Okano, 1991 (Le)
P. c. soloni M. Okano & T. Okano, 1990 (Bl)
P. c. treadawayi (Jumalon, 1975) (N)

- Paruparo annie Takanami, 1982 (south-eastern Lz)
- Paruparo rosemarie endemic Seki, 1993 (Le)
- Paruparo violacea endemic (Schröder & Treadaway, 1978) (north-eastern Mi)
- Paruparo lumawigi endemic (Schröder, 1976)

P. l. lumawigi (Schröder, 1976) (Camiguin de Lz, Lz, Mq)
P. l. jumaloni Treadaway & Nuyda, 1993 (Sn)
P. l. mindorana Schröder & Treadaway, 1993 (Mo)
P. l. panayensis Hayashi, (Mi, western Py)

- Paruparo mio Hayashi, (Mi (Surigao))

genus: Eliotia

- Eliotia mioae Hayashi, 1978 (eastern Mi)
- Eliotia australis Schröder & Treadaway, 1990 endemic (south-western Mi)
- Eliotia circumdata Schröder, Treadaway & Hayashi, 1981 endemic

E. c. circumdata Schröder, Treadaway & Hayashi, 1981 (Lz, Mq, Mo)
E. c. panayensis Schröder, Treadaway & Hayashi, 1981 (N, Py)

- Eliotia jalindra (Horsfield, [1829])

E. j. balabacensis Schröder & Treadaway, 1986 (Bl)
E. j. maganda Takanami, 1982 (Mi)
E. j. mindorensis Schröder & Treadaway, 1985 (Mo)
E. j. palawandra Staudinger, 1889 (Dumaran, Pn)
E. j. shiraishii Takanami, 1984 (north-western Lz)
E. j. obsoleta Schröder & Treadaway, 1993 (Sng, Twi)

- Eliotia plateni Semper, 1890

E. p. plateni (Semper, 1890) endemic (Bas, Le, Mi, Sr)
E. p. parvula Schröder & Treadaway, 1989 (Sng)

- Eliotia mariaba (Hewitson, 1869) endemic (Le, Mi, Sr)

genus: Suasa

- Suasa lisides (Hewitson, [1863])

S. l. liris Staudinger, 1889 (Pn)

genus: Remelana

- Remelana davisi Jumalon, 1975 endemic

R. l. davisi Jumalon, 1975 (Mi)
R. l. fulminans Schröder & Treadaway, 1978 (Lz, Mq)
R. l. negrosensis M. Okano & T. Okano, 1990 (N)
R. l. noeli Treadaway & Nuyda, 1993 (Mo)

- Remelana jangala (Horsfield, [1829])

R. j. esra Fruhstorfer, 1907 (Cn, Dumaran, Pn)
R. j. westermanni (C. Felder & R. Felder, [1865]) (Bl, Bas, Bl, Bg, Cu, Camiguin de Lz, Ca, Dt, Homonhon, Le, Lz, Mq, Me, Mo, Mi, N, Pnn, Py, Romblon, Sr, Sng, Sb, Sn, Twi

genus: Britomartis

- Britomartis igarashii Hayashi, 1976 (Pn)

genus: Ancema

- Ancema blanka (de Nicéville, 1894)

A. b. blanka (de Nicéville, 1894) (Pn)

genus: Pseudotajuria

- Pseudotajuria donatana (de Nicéville, [1889])

P. d. bilara M. Okano & T. Okano, 1990 (Bl)
P. d. mansaka Osada, 1987 (south-eastern Mi)

genus: Hypolycaena

- Hypolycaena thecloides (C. Felder & R. Felder, 1860)

H. t. camotana Fruhstorfer, 1912 (Ca)
H. t. philippina Staudinger, 1889 (Cn, Cu, Camiguin de Lz, Lz, Mo, Mi, Pn, Sn)
H. t. vardara Fruhstorfer, 1912 (Siargao)

- Hypolycaena erylus (Godart, [1824])

H. e. aimnestus Fruhstorfer, 1912 (Cy, Dumaran, Pn, Mo)
H. e. georgius Fruhstorfer, 1912 (Bg, Jl, Sng, Si, Sb, Twi)
H. e. orsiphantes Fruhstorfer, 1912 (Bas, Camiguin de Mi, Dt, Le, Mi, Sr)
H. e. tmolus C. Felder & R. Felder, 1862 (Camiguin de Lz, Lz, Mq, Me, Mo, N, Py, Romblon, Sni)

- Hypolycaena sipylus (C. Felder, 1860)

H. s. tharrytas C. Felder & R. Felder, 1862 (Alabat, Bl, Bas, Bl, Cu, Camiguin de Mi, Jl, Le, Lz, Mq, Me, Mo, Mi, Pn, Py, Sr)

- Hypolycaena ithna Hewitson, 1869 (Camiguin de Lz, Cu, Dumaran, Lz, Mq, Mi, Pn, Py, Sng, Sn, Si, Twi)
- Hypolycaena othona Hewitson, [1865]

H. o. waltraudae Treadaway & Nuyda, 1994 (Pn)

- Hypolycaena irawana Hayashi, (Pn)
- Hypolycaena schroederi Hayashi, 1984 (Mi, Sr)
- Hypolycaena shirozui Hayashi, 1981

H. s. shirozui Hayashi, 1981 (Le, Mi, Sr)
H. s. madilimi Treadaway & Nuyda, 1995 (N)

- Hypolycaena toshikoae Hayashi, 1984 (Lz)

genus: Zeltus

- Zeltus amasa (Hewitson, [1865])

Z. a. masaya Takanami, 1984 (Mi)
Z. a. miyatakei Hayashi, 1977 (Pn)

genus: Deudorix

- Deudorix epijarbas (Moore, [1858])

D. e. epijarba (Moore, [1858]) (Catanduanes, Cu, Le, Lz, Mq, Me, Mo, Mi, N, Pn, Py, Sr, Sb, Twi)
D. e. corolianus Fruhstorfer (Pn, P)

- Deudorix philippinensis Schröder, Treadaway & Hayashi, 1981 (Mq, Me, Mo, Mi, N, Sn)
- Deudorix apayao Schröder & Treadaway, 1983 (northern & central Pn)

genus: Virachola

- Virachola smilis (Hewitson, [1863])

V. s. vocetius Fruhstorfer, 1912 (Ba, Lz, Mq, Mo, Mi, Pn)

- Virachola kessuma (Horsfield, [1829])

V. k. deliochus (Hewitson, 1874) (Mi, Pn)

- Virachola masamichii Okubo, 1983 (south-eastern Mi)

genus: Sinthusa

- Sinthusa mindanensis Hayashi, Schröder & Treadaway, 1978

S. m. mindanensis Hayashi, Schröder & Treadaway, 1978 (southern Mi (Mt. Apo)
S. m. stephaniae Hayashi, Schröder & Treadaway, 1978 (Le, northern Mi (Bukidnon), Sr)
S. m. yoshiae Hayashi, 1981 (N)

- Sinthusa natsumiae Hayashi, 1979

S. n. natsumiae Hayashi, 1979 (Le, Mi)
S. n. ondai Takanami, 1982 (Lz, Mq, Mo, N)

- Sinthusa privata Fruhstorfer

S. p. kawazoei Hayashi, 1976 (Pn)

- Sinthusa nasaka (Horsfield, [1829])

S. n. ogatai Hayashi, 1976 (Pn)

- Sinthusa peregrinus Staudinger, 1889 (Bas, Mi, Pn)

genus: Araotes

- Araotes lapithis (Moore, [1858])

A. l. arianus Fruhstorfer, 1912 (Pn)

- Araotes perrhaebis Semper, 1890 (Bas, Mi)

genus: Bindahara

- Bindahara phocides (Fabricius, 1793)

B. p. phocides (Fabricius, 1793) (Bl, Cn, Pn, Sng, Sb, Twi)
B. p. origenes Fruhstorfer, 1912 (Catanduanes, Cu, Camiguin de Mi, Ca, Lz, Mq, Me, Mo, Mi, Py, Sr, Sni)

genus: Rapala

- Rapala diopites (Hewitson, 1869)

R. d. diopites (Hewitson, 1869) (Camiguin de Lz)
R. d. alcetas Staudinger, 1889 (Bl, Cn, Pn)
R. d. alcetina Semper, 1890 (Bas, Bl, Cu, Camiguin de Mi, Ca, Dt, Gu, Le, Lz, Mq, Me, Mo, Mi, N, Py, Sr, Sng, Sn, Sb, Twi)
R. d. bandatara Fruhstorfer (Baslian, Jl)
R. d. ashinensis Murayama & Okamura (Lz to south-eastern Mindanao)

- Rapala elcia (Hewitson, 1863)

R. e. elcia (Hewitson, 1863) (Lz, Mq, Polillo)

- Rapala hades (de Nicéville, [1895]) (Mi, southern N, Py)
- Rapala masara Osada, 1987 (south-eastern Mi)
- Rapala tomokoae Hayashi, Schröder & Treadaway, 1978

R. t. tomokoae Hayashi, Schröder & Treadaway, 1978 (Le, Mi, Sr, Twi)
R. t. bilara M. Okano & T. Okano, 1990 (Bl)
R. t. takanamii Hayashi, 1984 (N, Py)

- Rapala zamona Fruhstorfer, 1912 (Ba, Lz)
- Rapala manea (Hewitson, [1863])

R. m. ingana Fruhstorfer, 1912 (Pn, P excluding Bas)
R. m. philippensis Fruhstorfer, 1912 (Bl, Lz, Mq, Mo, Mi, N, Sb, Twi)

- Rapala varuna (Horsfield, [1829])

R. v. nada Fruhstorfer, 1912 (Bl, Lz, Mq, Mo, Mi, N, Sb, Twi)

- Rapala rhoecus de Nicéville, [1895]

R. r. melida Fruhstorfer, 1912 (Pn)

- Rapala scintilla de Nicéville, [1890]

R. s. nemana Semper, 1890 (Ba, Camiguin de Mi, Le, Mq, Mi, Pn, Pnn, Sr)

- Rapala dieneces (Hewitson, 1878)

R. d. dieneces (Hewitson, 1878) (Bas, Mi, Pn, Sng)
R. d. valeria Fruhstorfer (Bas)

- Rapala caerulescens Staudinger, 1889 (Bas, Cu, Jl, Lz, Mq, Mo, Mi, Sn
- Rapala suffusa (Moore, [1879])

R. s. anabasis Staudinger, 1889 (Bl, Pn)

- Rapala phrangida Fruhstorfer, 1912 (Le, Lz)
- Rapala damona Swinhoe, 1890 (Mo, Pn)

== Riodinidae ==
genus: Zemeros

- Zemeros flegyas (Cramer, [1780])

Z. f. hondai Hayashi, 1976

genus: Dodona

- Dodona deodata Hewitson, 1876

D. d. aponata Semper, 1889 (southern Mi (Mt. Apo))
D. d. malindangensis Schröder & Treadaway, 1988 (north(western Mi (Mt. Malindang))
D. d. ohtsukai Hayashi, 1984 (N (Mt. Canlaon))
D. d. sakaii Hayashi, 1976 (Pn)
D. d. treadawayi Hanafusa, 1989 (northern Lzi)

genus: Laxita

- Laxita thuisto (Hewitson, 1861)

L. t. eutyches Fruhstorfer (Pn)

genus: Paralaxita

- Paralaxita orphna (Boisduval, 1836)

P. o. orphna (Boisduval, 1836) (Pn)

genus: Taxila

- Taxila haquinus (Fabricius, 1793)

T. h. palawanicus Staudinger, 1889 (Bl, Pn)

genus: Abisara

- Abisara kausambi C. Felder & R. Felder, 1860

A. k. aja Fruhstorfer, 1904 (Bl, Cn, Pn)

- Abisara echerius (Stoll, 1790)

A. e. bazilensis Fruhstorfer, 1900 (Bas)
A. e. cavana Schröder & Treadaway, 1978 (Sb)
A. e. laura Fruhstorfer, 1904 (Lz, Mo)
A. e. palawana Schröder & Treadaway, 1889 (Pn)
A. e. panayensis Medicielo & Hanafusa, 1994 (Py)
A. e. simillima Schröder & Treadaway, 1995 (Bg, Sng, Twi)

- Abisara saturata (Moore, [1878])

A. s. corbeti Bennett, 1950 (Mi)

- Abisara mindanaensis Semper, 1892

A. m. mindanensis Semper, 1892 (Mi)
A. m. boholensis M. Okano & T. Okano, 1993 (Bl, Le)
A. m. canlaonensis Medicielo & Hanafusa, 1994 (N)
A. m. cudaca Fruhstorfer, 1914 (Lz)
A. m. mudita Fruhstorfer, 1914 (Mo)

- Abisara geza Fruhstorfer, [1904]

A. g. litavicus Fruhstorfer, 1912 (Pn)

== Hesperiidae ==
genus: Bibasis

- Bibasis oedipodea (Swainson, 1820)

B. o. oedipodea (Swainson, 1820) (Bl, Pn, Sng, Si, Twi)
B. o. paltra Evans, 1949 (Cu, Le, Lz, Mq, Mi, Mo, N)

- Bibasis etelka (Hewitson, [1867]) (Mi, Pn)
- Bibasis harisa (Moore, [1866])

B. h. consobrina (Plötz, 1884) (Sng, Si)
B. h. pala de Jong & Treadaway, 1993 (Pn)
B. h. grandis de Jong & Treadaway, 1993 (Dt, Le, Sr)

- Bibasis gomata (Moore, [1866])

B. g. lorquini (Mabille, 1876) (Calamian, Camiguin de Lz, Le, Lz, Mq, Mi, Mo, N, Pn, Py, Pl)

- Bibasis sena (Moore, [1866])

B. s. palawana (Staudinger, 1889) (Bl, Calamian, Cu, Hn, Le, Lz, Mq, Mi, N, Pn, Py, Pl, Sng, Si, Sn, Twi)

genus: Hasora

- Hasora proxissima Elwes & Edwards, 1897

H. p. proxissima Elwes & Edwards, 1897 (Le, Mo, Mi)
H. p. siva Evans, 1932 (Pn)

- Hasora borneensis Elwes & Edwards, 1897

H. b. luza Evans, 1949 (Le, Lz, Me, Mi, Mo, N, Pnn, Le, Sr)

- Hasora mavis Evans, 1934 (Lz, N, Pnn, Sr)
- Hasora chromus (Cramer, [1780])

H. c. chromus (Cramer, [1780]) (Bas, Le, Mq, N, Twi, Ticao)

- Hasora taminatus (Hübner, 1818)

H. t. malayana (C. Felder & R. Felder, 1860) (Bl, southern Pn)
H. t. padma Fruhstorfer, 1911 (Bas, Bl, Camiguin de Lz, Cu, Hn, Le, Lz, Mq, Me, Mo, Mi, N, central and northern Pn, Pnn, Py, Pnn, Romblon, Sn, Twi, Ticao)

- Hasora schoenherr (Latreille, [1824])

H. s. babuyana Treadaway & Nuyda, 1995 (Babuyan)
H. s. chuza (Hewitson, [1867]) (Bl, Pn)
H. s. saida (Hewitson, [1867]) (Bl, Camiguin de Mi, Le, Lz, Mq, Mi, Mo, N, Pnn, Py, Sr, Sn)

- Hasora mixta (Mabille, 1876)

H. m. mixta (Mabille, 1876) (Bas, Biliran, Cu, Camiguin de Lz, Le, Lz, Mq, Me, Mi, Mo, N, Pnn, Py, Sr, Sn)
H. m. prabha Fruhstorfer, 1911 (Bl, Pn, Twi)

- Hasora badra (Moore, [1858])

H. b. badra (Moore, [1858]) (Bl, Calamian, Pn)

- Hasora quadripunctata (Mabille, 1876)

H. q. gnaeus (Plötz, 1884) (Camiguin de Mi, Dt, Le, Mi, Mo, Sr)

- Hasora vitta (Butler, 1870)

H. v. proximata (Staudinger, 1889) (Bl, Lz, Mindanao, Mo, Pn)

- Hasora moestissima (Mabille, 1876)

H. m. moestissima (Mabille, 1876) (Camiguin de Mi, Hn, Le, Lz, Me, Mi, Mo, N, Sr)

- Hasora caeruleostriata de Jong, 1982 (Hn, Le, Lz, Me, N, Pn, Py, Sr)
- Hasora khoda (Mabille, 1876)

H. k. minsona Swinhoe, 1907 (Bl, Le, Lz, Mq, N, Pn, Py, Sr, Twi)

- Hasora leucospila (Mabille, 1891)

H. l. leucospila (Mabille, 1891) (Bas, Hn, Le, Lz, Mi, Mo, N, Pn, Sr)

genus: Badamia

- Badamia exclamationis (Fabricius, 1775) (Bas, Hn, Le, Lz, Mq, Mi, N, Pn, Pl, Sr, Si, Twi, Ticao)

genus: Choaspes

- Choaspes plateni (Staudinger, 1888)

C. p. adhara Fruhstorfer, 1911 (Mi)
C. p. negrosa de Jong & Treadaway, 1993 (N)
C. p. boreus de Jong & Treadaway, 1993 (Lz, Mo)
C. p. visaya de Jong, 1980 (Biliran, Bl, Le, Pnn, Sr)
C. p. caudatus Evans, 1932 (Pn)

- Choaspes estrella de Jong, 1980

C. e. estrella de Jong, 1980 (Lz, Mo, N, Py)
C. e. pallens Schröder & Treadaway, 1986 (Le, Mi, Sr)

- Choaspes subcaudatus (C. Felder & R. Felder, [1867])

C. s. crawfurdi Distant, 1886 (Twi)

genus: Celaenorrhinus

- Celaenorrhinus nigricans (de Nicéville, 1885)

C. n. mindanus de Jong, 1981 (Le, Lz, Mi)

- Celaenorrhinus putra (Moore, [1866])

C. p. brahmaputra Elwes & Edwards, 1897 (Pn)

- Celaenorrhinus treadawayi de Jong, 1981

C. t. treadawayi de Jong, 1981 (Mi)
C. t. samarensis de Jong, 1981 (Sr)

- Celaenorrhinus asmara (Butler, [1879])

C. a. palajava (Staudinger, 1889) (Pn)

- Celaenorrhinus ficulnea (Hewitson, 1868)

C. f. ficulnea (Hewitson, 1868) (Pn)

- Celaenorrhinus bazilanus (Fruhstorfer, 1909)

C. b. bazilanus (Fruhstorfer, 1909) (Bas, Mi)

- Celaenorrhinus halconis de Jong & Treadaway, 1993 (Mo (Mt. Halcon))

genus: Tapena

- Tapena thwaitesi Moore, 1881

T. t. bornea Evans, 1931 (Bl, Pn)

genus: Darpa

- Darpa pteria (Hewitson, 1868)

D. p. pteria (Hewitson, 1868) (Le, Lz, Mi)
D. p. dealbata Distant, 1886 (Pn)

genus: Odina

- Odina cuneiformis (Semper, 1892) (Camiguin de Lz, Le, Lz, Mq, Mo, Pn)

genus: Coladenia

- Coladenia igna (Semper, 1892)

C. i. igna (Semper, 1892) (Le, Lz, Mi, Mo, Sr)
C. i. marinda de Jong & Treadaway, 1992 (Mq)

- Coladenia ochracea de Jong & Treadaway, 1992 (Le, Mi, Py)
- Coladenia semperi Elwes & Edwards, 1897 (Camiguin de Mi, Le)
- Coladenia minor Chiba, Nakanishi, Fukuda & Yata, 1991 (Lz, Mq, Mo)
- Coladenia similis de Jong & Treadaway, 1992 (Camiguin de Mi, Lz, Mq, Mi)
- Coladenia palawana (Staudinger, 1889) (Pn)

genus: Gerosis

- Gerosis limax (Plötz, 1884)

G. l. philippina Evans, 1932 (Bl, Pn)

- Gerosis corona (Semper, 1892)

G. c. corona Semper, 1892 ( Alabat, Camiguin de Mi, Le, Lz, Me, Mi, Mo (excluding Mt. Halcon), Pnn, Sr)
G. c. halcona Treadaway & Nuyda, 1995 (northern Mo (Mt. Halcon))

genus: Tagiades

- Tagiades japetus (Stoll, [1781])

T. j. titus (Plötz, 1884) (Bas, Biliran, Bl, Calamian, Camiguin de Lz, Camiguin de Mi, Catanduanes, Cu, Gu, Le, Lubang, Lz, Me, Mi, Mo, N, Pn, Py, Pl, Sr, So, Si, Sn, Twi)

- Tagiades gana (Moore, 1865)

T. g. gana (Moore, 1865) (Pn, Si, Twi)
T. g. elegans (Mabille, 1877) (Bas, Biliran, Bl, Camiguin de Mi, Catanduanes, Dt, Le, Lz, Mq, Me, Mi, Mo, N, Pnn, Pl, Sr, So, Sn)
T. g. semperi Fruhstorfer, 1910 (Camiguin de Lz)

- Tagiades parra Fruhstorfer, 1910

T. p. parra Fruhstorfer, 1910 (Pn)

- Tagiades ultra Evans, 1932 (Pn)
- Tagiades trebellius (Hopffer, 1874)

T. t. martinus (Plötz, 1884) (Babuyan, Bas, Bl, Cu, Camiguin de Mi, Dt, Hn, Le, Lz, Mq, Mi, Mo, Pn, Pl, Sr, Sn, Twi, Ticao)

genus: Mooreana

- Mooreana princeps (Semper, 1892) (Le, Mi, Pnn, Sr)
- Mooreana trichoneura (C. Felder & R. Felder, 1860)

M. t. trichoneuroides (Elwes & Edwards, 1897) (Pn)

genus: Odontoptilium

- Odontoptilum angulatum (C. Felder, 1862)

O. a. helisa (Semper, 1892) (Bas, Bl, Cu, Le, Mi, Mo, N, Py, Sr)
O. a. sinka Evans, 1949 (Lz, Mq, Pl)

- Odontoptilium pygela (Hewitson, 1868)

O. p. pygela (Hewitson, 1868) (Pn, Sng, Twi)

- Odontoptilium leptogramma (Hewitson, 1868) (Cu, Le, Lz, Mi, Mo, Sr, Sn)

genus: Aeromachus

- Aeromachus musca (Mabille, 1876) (Cu, Lz, Mo, Mi, N, So)
- Aeromachus plumbeola (C. Felder & R. Felder, 1867) (Biliran, Le, Lz, Me, Mi, Mo, N, Py, Sr)

genus: Thoressa

- Thoressa justini Inoue & Kawazoé, 1969

T. j. justini Inoue & Kawazoé, 1969 (northern Lz)
T. j. raphaeli Nuyda & Kitamura, 1994 (Le)

genus: Halpe

- Halpe mahapara Fruhstorfer, 1911 (Calamian, Pn)
- Halpe ormenes (Plötz, 1886)

H. o. vistula Evans, 1937 (Pn)

- Halpe palawea (Staudinger, 1889) (Calamian, Pn)
- Halpe luteisquama (Mabille, 1876) (Bas, Camiguin de Lz, Cu, Le, Lz, Mq, Mi, Mo, N, Pn, Py, Sr, Si, Sn, Twi)
- Halpe latipinna de Jong & Treadaway, 1993 (Mo (Mt. Halcon))
- Halpe dante Evans, 1949

H. d. dante Evans, 1949 (N)
H. d. luzona Evans, 1949 (Lz)
H. d. tilia Evans, 1949 (Le, Mi)

- Halpe sulphurifera (Herrich-Schäffer, 1869) (Jl, Le, Lz, Mq, Me, Mi, Mo, N, Pn, Sn, Twi)
- Halpe toxopea Evans, 1932 (Calamian, Pn)
- Halpe pelethronix Fruhstorfer, 1910

H. p. pelethronix Fruhstorfer, 1910 (Pn)

- Halpe inconspicua de Jong & Treadaway, 1993 (Le, Pnn, Sr)
- Halpe purpurascens de Jong & Treadaway, 1993 (Le, Me, Mi, N, Py)

genus: Koruthaialos

- Koruthaialos rubecula (Plötz, 1882)

K. r. atra Evans, 1949 (Cu, Le, Mi, N, Sr)
K. r. luzonensis Fruhstorfer, 1910 (Lz, Mq)
K. r. ponta Evans, 1949 (Calamian, Pn)
K. r. palawites Staudinger, 1889 (Calamian, Pn)

- Koruthaialos sindu (C. Felder & R. Felder, 1860)

K. s. sindu (C. Felder & R. Felder, 1860) (Pn)

genus: Psolos

- Psolos fuligo (Mabille, 1876)

P. s. fuligo (Mabille, 1876) (Bl, Bas, Bl, Cu, Camiguin de Mi, Catanduanes, Jl, Le, Lz, Me, Mi, Mo, N, Pn, Py, Sr, Si, Sn, Twi)

genus: Ancistroides

- Ancistroides nigrita (Latreille, [1824])

A. n. fumatus (Mabille, 1876) (Babuyan, Bl, Bas, Biliran, Bl, Camiguin de Mi, Cu, Gu, Le, Lz, Me, Mi, Mo, N, Pn, Py, Sr, Sn)

genus: Notocrypta

- Notocrypta paralysos (Wood-Mason & de Nicéville, 1881)

N. p. chunda Fruhstorfer, 1911 (Bl, Calamian, Pn)
N. p. varians (Plötz, 1884) (Si)
N. p. volux (Mabille, 1883) (Bas, Biliran, Cu, Dt, Hn, Le, Lz, Mq, Me, Mi, Mo, N, Py, Pl, Sr, Sn, Twi group excluding Si)

- Notocrypta clavata (Staudinger, 1889)

N. c. clavata (Staudinger, 1889) (Pn)

- Notocrypta howarthi Hayashi, 1980 (Mi)
- Notocrypta feisthamelii (Boisduval, 1832)

N. f. alinkara Fruhstorfer, 1911 (Babuyan, Calamian, Cu, Le, Lz, Mq, Mi, Mo, N, Pn, Pnn, Py, Pl, Sr, Sn)

genus: Suada

- Suada catoleucos (Staudinger, 1889) (Mi, Pn)
- Suada albina (Semper, 1892) (Bas, Le, Lz, Mi, Pl)

genus: Suastus

- Suastus minutus (Moore, 1877)

S. m. scopas (Staudinger, 1889) (Pn)
S. m. compactus de Jong & Treadaway, 1993 (Calamian)

- Suastus migreus Semper, 1892 (Babuyan, Cu, Hn, Lz, Mq, Mi, Mo, Sn, Twi)

genus: Cupitha

- Cupitha pureea (Moore, 1877) (Bl, Pn)

genus: Zographetus

- Zographetus pallens de Jong & Treadaway, 1993 (Camiguin de Lz, Mq)
- Zographetus ogygia (Hewitson, [1866])

Z. o. durga (Plötz, 1884) (Camiguin de Mi, Le, Lz, Mq, Mi, Mo, N, Pn, Py, Pl, Sr)
Z. o. ogygioides (Elwes & Edwards, 1897) (Me, Py, Sn, Twi)

- Zographetus doxus Eliot, 1959 (Pn)
- Zographetus abima (Hewitson, 1877) (Pn)
- Zographetus rama (Mabille, 1876) (Le, Mo, Sr)

genus: Oerane

- Oerane microthyrus (Mabille, 1883)

O. m. microthyrus (Mabille, 1883) (Le, Lz, Mq, Mi, Mo, Sr)

genus: Hyarotis

- Hyarotis adrastus (Stoll, [1780])

H. a. praba (Moore, 1866) (Calamian, Mi, Pn)

- Hyarotis microsticta (Wood-Mason & de Nicéville, 1887)

H. m. microsticta (Wood-Mason & de Nicéville, 1887) (Lz, Mo)

- Hyarotis iadera de Nicéville, 1895 (Pn)

genus: Quedara

- Quedara monteithi (Wood-Mason & de Nicéville, 1887)

Q. m. monteithi (Wood-Mason & de Nicéville, 1887) (Bl)
Q. m. noctis (Staudinger, 1889) (Calamian, Le, Mi, Pn, Sr)

genus: Isma

- Isma bipunctata (Elwes & Edwards, 1897) (Mi, Pn)
- Isma binotatus (Elwes & Edwards, 1897) (Mi)
- Isma feralia (Hewitson, [1868]) (Le, Mi, Sr)

genus: Pyroneura

- Pyroneura flavia (Staudinger, 1889)

P. f. flavia (Staudinger, 1889) (Pn)

- Pyroneura agnesia (Eliot, 1967)

P. a. limbanga Eliot, 1967 (Pn)

- Pyroneura liburnia (Hewitson, 1868)

P. l. liburnia (Hewitson, 1868) (Lz, Mq, Pl)
P. l. divinae Schröder & Treadaway, 1987 (Py, Romblon, Sn)
P. l. dora de Jong & Treadaway, 1993 (Mo)
P. l. minda (Evans, 1941) (Hn, Le, Mi)
P. l. rosa de Jong & Treadaway, 1993 (N)
P. l. wita de Jong & Treadaway, 1993 (Twi)

- Pyroneura derna (Evans, 1941) (Pn)
- Pyroneura niasana (Fruhstorfer, 1909)

P. n. burmana (Evans, 1926) (Pn)

- Pyroneura toshikoae Hayashi, 1980 (eastern Mi)

genus: Plastingia

- Plastingia naga (de Nicéville, 1884) (Bl, Camiguin de Lz, Le, Lz, Mq, Mi, Mo, Pn, Pnn)
- Plastingia pellonia Fruhstorfer, 1909 (Pn)
- Plastingia viburnia (Semper, 1892) (Lz, Mi, Mo, N, Pn, Sr)

genus: Salanoemia

- Salanoemia sala (Hewitson, 1866) (Pn)
- Salanoemia similis (Elwes & Edwards, 1897) (Du, Pn)

genus: Xanthoneura

- Xanthoneura telesinus (Mabille, 1878) (Bl, Le, Lz, Mi, Mo, N, Sr)

genus: Lotongus

- Lotongus calathus (Hewitson, 1876)

L. c. calathus (Hewitson, 1876) (Pn)
L. c. shigeo Treadaway & Nuyda, 1994 (Bas)

genus: Zela

- Zela excellens (Staudinger, 1889) (Pn)
- Zela zeus de Nicéville, [1895]

Z. z. zeus de Nicéville, [1895] (Twi)
Z. z. major Evans, 1932 (Hn, Le, Lz, Mi, Mo, Sr, Sn)

- Zela zenon de Nicéville, [1895] (Pn)

genus: Gangara

- Gangara thyrsis (Fabricius, 1775)

G. t. thyrsis (Fabricius, 1775) (Pn)
G. t. philippensis Fruhstorfer, 1910 (Camiguin de Lz, Le, Lz, Mi, Mo, Pnn, Sr, Sn)
G. t. magnificens de Jong & Treadaway, 1993 (N, Mt. Canlaon)

- Gangara lebadea (Hewitson, [1868])

G. l. lebadea (Hewitson, [1868]) (Pn)
G. l. janlourensi Schröder & Treadaway, 1987 (Le)
G. l. ustina Treadaway & Nuyda, 1995 (Pn)

genus: Erionota

- Erionota thrax (Linnaeus, 1767)

E. t. thrax (Linnaeus, 1767) (Cu, Catanduanes, Lz (excluding northern & north-western), Mq, Me, Mo, N, Pn, Py, Pl, Si, Sn, Twi)
E. t. alexandra Semper, 1892 (northern & north-western Lz)
E. t. mindana Evans, 1941 (Dt, Hn, Jl, Le, Mi, Sr)

- Erionota hiraca (Moore, 1881)

E. h. apex Semper, 1892 (Le, Lz, Mi, Mo, Pn, Pl, Sr, Ticao)

- Erionota surprisa de Jong & Treadaway, 1992 (Babuyan, Cu, Le, Lz, Mq, Mi, Mo, N, Pn, Py, Pl, Sr, Twi, Ticao)
- Erionota sybirita (Hewitson, 1876) (Pn)
- Erionota torus Evans, 1941 (Cu, Dt, Le, Mi, N, Py, Sr)

genus: Matapa

- Matapa aria (Moore, 1866) (Calamian, Catanduanes, Hn, Le, Lz, Mi, Mo, N, Pn, Py, Sn)
- Matapa intermedia de Jong, 1983

M. i. nigrita de Jong, 1983 (Sr)

- Matapa celsina (C. Felder & R. Felder, 1867) (eastern Mi)

genus: Unkana

- Unkana ambasa (Moore, [1858])

U. a. ambasa (Moore, [1858]) (Pn)
U. a. batara Distant, 1886 (Si, Twi)
U. a. mindanaensis Fruhstorfer, 1911 (Bl, Camiguin de Lz, Dt, Hn, Le, Lz, Mi, Mo, N, Py, Sr, Sn)

genus: Hidari

- Hidari irava (Moore, [1858]) (Mi, Sulu Archipelago)

genus: Acerbas

- Acerbas anthea (Hewitson, 1868)

A. a. anthea (Hewitson, 1868) (Le, Mi, Pnn)
A. a. luzona de Jong, 1982 (Lz)

- Acerbas duris (Mabille, 1883)

A. d. duris (Mabille, 1883) (Camiguin de Lz, Camiguin de Mi, Le, Lz, Mi, Mo, N)

genus: Pirdana

- Pirdana hyela (Hewitson, 1867)

P. h. hyela Hewitson, 1867 (Lz, Pn)

- Pirdana fusca de Jong & Treadaway, 1993 (Mi, Sr)

genus: Taractrocera

- Taractrocera luzonensis (Staudinger, 1889)

T. l. luzonensis (Staudinger, 1889) (Bl, Bas, Cu, Dt, Le, Lz, Mq, Me, Mi, Mo, N, Pn, Py, Sr, Sn)
T. l. stella Evans, 1934 (Si, Twi)

genus: Oriens

- Oriens paragola (de Nicéville, 1896) (Pn)
- Oriens gola (Moore, 1877)

O. g. pseudolus (Mabille, 1883) (Bl, Calamian, Lz, Pn)

- Oriens californica (Scudder, 1872) (Bl, Hn, Jl, Le, Lz, Me, Mi, Mo, Py, Pl, Sr, Sn, Twi)
- Oriens fons Evans, 1949 (Bas, Lz, Mi, Mo, Py, Sr)

genus: Potanthus

- Potanthus omaha (W. H. Edwards, 1863)

P. o. bione Evans, 1949 (Mi)
P. o. maesina (Evans, 1934) (Twi)

- Potanthus fettingi (Moschler, 1878)

P. f. alpha (Evans, 1934) (Lz)

- Potanthus niobe (Evans, 1934)

P. n. niobe (Evans, 1934) (Dt, Mi, N, Sn)
P. n. hyuga de Jong & Treadaway, 1993 (northern Lz, northern Mo)

- Potanthus confucius (C. Felder & R. Felder, 1862)

P. c. yojana (Fruhstorfer, 1911) (Pn)

- Potanthus mingo (W. H. Edwards, 1866)

P. m. mingo (W. H. Edwards, 1866) (Bas, Jl, Le, Lz, Me, Mi, Mo, N, Py, Sr, Sng, Twi)

- Potanthus pava (Fruhstorfer, 1911)

P. p. lesbia Evans, 1934 (Dt, Lz, Mi, Mo, Pl, Sn)

- Potanthus ganda (Fruhstorfer, 1911)

P. g. marla Evans, 1949 (Calamian, Pn)

- Potanthus hetaerus (Mabille, 1883)

P. h. hetaerus (Mabille, 1883) (Bng, Hn, Le, Lz, Mi, Mo, N, Py, Pl, Romblon, Sn, Twi)

- Potanthus serina (Plötz, 1883) (Bl, Calamian, Pn, Si, Twi)

genus: Telicota

- Telicota colon (Fabricius, 1775)

T. c. vaja Corbet, 1942 (Bl, Lz, Mq, Me, Mi, Mo, N, Pn, Sn)

- Telicota augias (Linnaeus, 1763)

T. a. augias (Linnaeus, 1763) (Pn)
T. a. pythias (Mabille, 1878) (Bl, Camiguin de Mi, Catanduanes, Cu, Gu, Le, Lz, Mq, Mi, Mo, N, Py, Sr, Sn, Twi)

- Telicota ancilla (Herrich-Schäffer, 1869)

T. a. minda Evans, 1934 (Bas, Hn, Le, Lz, Me, Mi, Mo, N, Romblon, Sr, Ticao)
T. a. santa Evans, 1934 (Pn)

- Telicota ohara (Plötz, 1883)

T. o. jania Evans, 1949 (Bl, Bas, Hn, Le, Mq, Me, Mi, Mo, N, Pn, Pl, Sr, Sn)

- Telicota hilda Eliot, 1959

T. h. palawana Murayama & Uehara, 1992 (Pn)

genus: Cephrenes

- Cephrenes acalle (Hopffer, 1874)

C. a. kliana Evans, 1934 (Bl, Pn, Si)
C. a. chrysozona (Plötz, 1883) (Bl, Cu, Camiguin de Mi, Catanduanes, Le, Lz, Mq, Mi, Mo, N, Py, Pl, Sr, Sn)

genus: Prusiana

- Prusiana prusias (C. Felder, 1861)

P. p. matinus (Fruhstorfer, 1911) (Bas, Bl, Cu, Camiguin de Lz, Camiguin de Mi, Catanduanes, Gu, Hn, Le, Lz, Mq, Mi, Mo, N, Pn, Py, Pl, Sn, Twi)

genus: Parnara

- Parnara bada (Moore, 1878)

P. b. borneana Chiba & Eliot, 1991 (Camiguin de Lz, Hn, Le, Lz, Me, Mo, Mi, Pn, Romblon, Sn, Twi)
P. b. bada (Moore, 1878) (Lz, Me, Mi, Romblon, Pn, Sn)

- Parnara kawazoei Chiba & Eliot, 1991 (Hn, Le, Lz, Mi, Mo, N, Py, Sr, Sn)

genus: Borbo

- Borbo cinnara (Wallace, 1866) (Bl, Camiguin de Mi, Jl, Le, Lubang, Lz, Me, Mi, Mo, N, Pn, Py, Sr, Sng, Si, Twi)

genus: Pelopidas

- Pelopidas agna (Moore, 1866)

P. a. agna (Moore, 1866) (Bl, Bas, Cu, Camiguin de Lz, Hn, Jl, Le, Lz, Me, Mi, Mo, N, Pn, Pnn, Sr, Si, Sn, Twi, Ticao)

- Pelopidas mathias (Fabricius, 1798)

P. m. mathias (Fabricius, 1798) (Bl, Camiguin de Lz, Camiguin de Mi, Catanduanes, Cu, Gu, Hn, Jl, Le, Lz, Mq, Me, Mo, N, Pn, Pnn, Py, Sr, Twi)

- Pelopidas conjuncta (Herrich-Schäffer, 1869)

P. c. conjuncta (Herrich-Schäffer, 1869) (Bas, Bl, Cu, Camiguin de Lz, Catanduanes, Dt, Hn, Le, Lz, Mq, Me, Mi, Mindor, N, Pn, Py, Pnn, Sr, Si, Sn, Twi)

genus: Polytremis

- Polytremis lubricans (Herrich-Schäffer, 1869)

P. l. lubricans (Herrich-Schäffer, 1869) (Si, Twi)

genus: Baoris

- Baoris oceia (Hewitson, 1868) (Babuyan, Bl, Bas, Biliran, Bl, Calamian, Camiguin de Mi, Catanduanes, Hn, Jl, Le, Lz, Mq, Mi, Mo, N, Pn, Pnn, Py, Sr, Si, Sn, Twi, Ticao)

genus: Caltoris

- Caltoris brunnea (Snellen, 1876)

C. b. caere de Nicéville, 1891 (Calamian, Pn)

- Caltoris bromus Leech, 1893

C. b. bromus Leech, 1893 (Le, Me, Mi, Pn, Py, Sr)

- Caltoris cormasa (Hewitson, 1876) (Hn, Le, Lz, Marindfuque, Mi, Mo, Pn, Sr, Si, Sn, Twi)
- Caltoris philippina (Herrich-Schäffer, 1869)

C. p. philippina (Herrich-Schäffer, 1869) (Bl, Bas, Camiguin de Mi, Cu, Le, Lz, Mi, Mo, N, Pn, Py, Si, Twi)
