= Caleta =

Caleta may refer to:

== People ==
- Duje Ćaleta-Car (born 1996), Croatian professional footballer

== Places ==
- Caleta Chaihuín, a coastal hamlet in Corral, Chile
- Caleta Córdoba, a small village in Chubut, Argentina
- Caleta Olivia, a coastal city in Argentina
- Caleta Tortel, a coastal village in Chile
- Caleta de Carquin District, in Huaura Province, Peru
- Caleta de Fuste, a community on the Canary Island of Fuerteventura; Antigua, Las Palmas, Spain
- Caleta de Sebo, a settlement on the Canary Island of Graciosa; part of Teguise, Spain
- La Caleta, Spain, a beach in Cádiz, Spain
- La Caleta, Tenerife, a village in Adeje province, Tenerife, Spain
- Las Caletas, a beach near Puerto Vallarta, Jalisco, Mexico
- Catalan Bay, a bay and fishing village in Gibraltar, known colloquially as La Caleta
- La Caleta Airport, an airport in La Romana, Dominican Republic
- Punta Caleta, the easternmost point of Cuba

== Nature ==
- Caleta (butterfly), a butterfly genus
- Caleta caleta, a blue butterfly species
- Caleta decidia, a blue butterfly species
