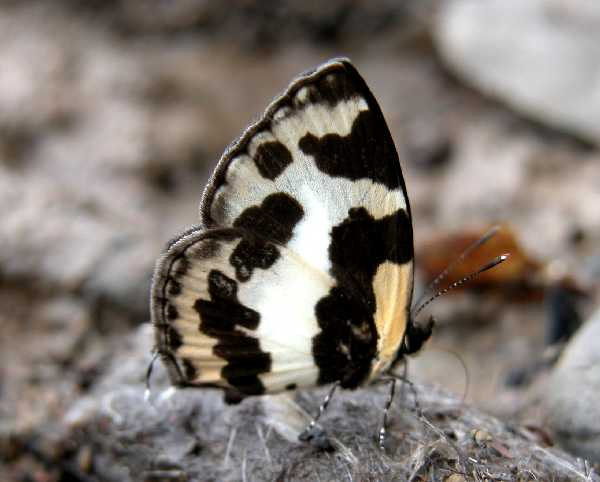
- At Jairampur, Arunachal Pradesh, India

Scientific classification
- Kingdom: Animalia
- Phylum: Arthropoda
- Class: Insecta
- Order: Lepidoptera
- Family: Lycaenidae
- Genus: Caleta
- Species: C. elna

Binomial name
- Caleta elna (Hewitson, 1876)

Synonyms
- Lycaena elna Hewitson, 1876; Castalius elna; Pycnophallium elna

= Caleta elna =

Elbowed Pierrot

Species of butterfly

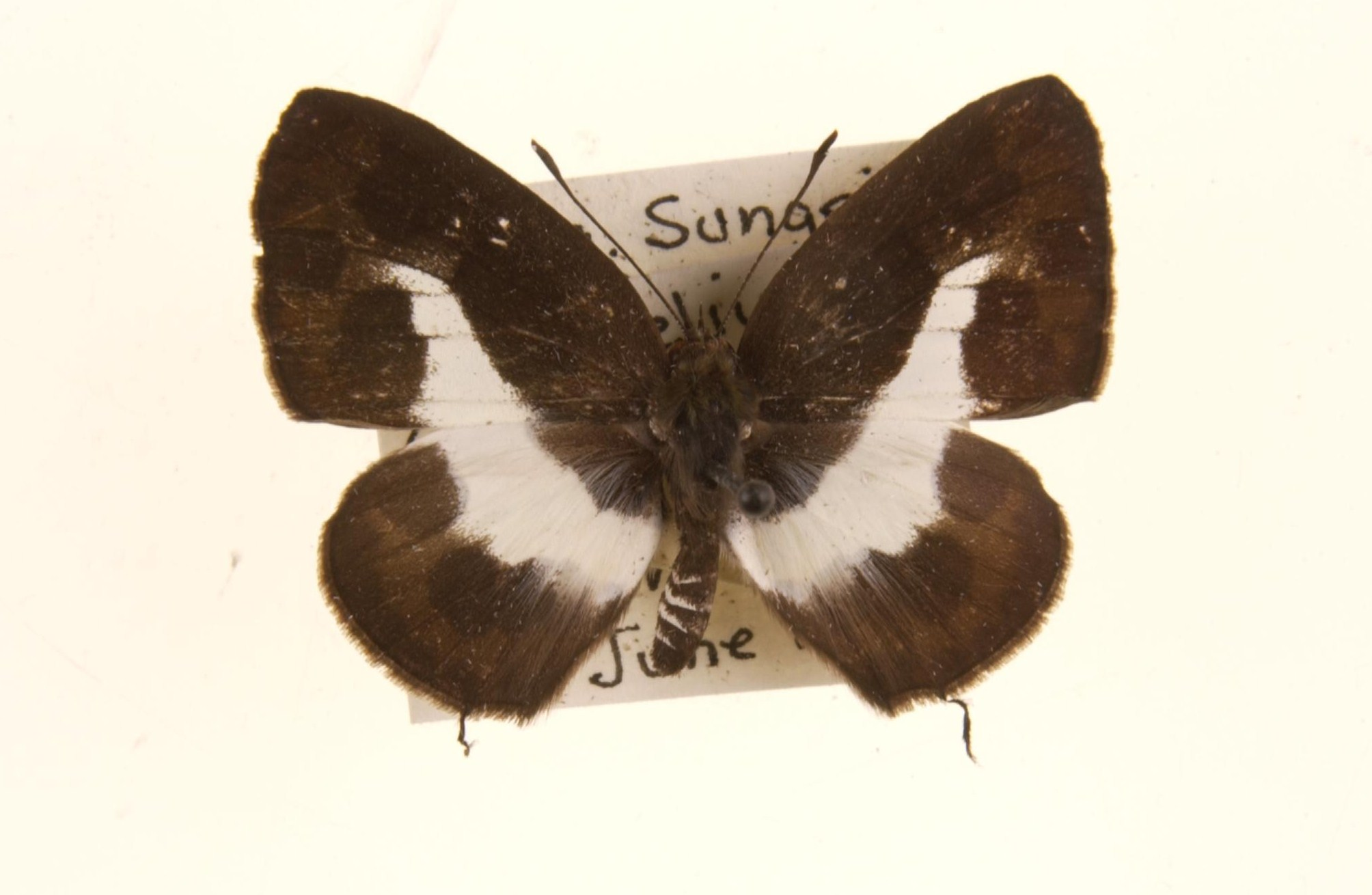
Upperside of a specimen from Malaya.

Caleta elna, the elbowed Pierrot, is a small butterfly found in India and Southeast Asia that belongs to the lycaenids or blues family.

== Subspecies ==
The subspecies of Caleta elna include:

- Caleta elna noliteia (Fruhstorfer, 1918) – Indo-Chinese Elbowed Pierrot
- Caleta elna elvira (Fruhstorfer, 1918)
- Caleta elna hilina (Fruhstorfer, 1918)
- Caleta elna rhodana (Fruhstorfer, 1918)
- Caleta elna epeus (Corbet, 1938)
- Caleta elna caletoides (Riley, 1945)

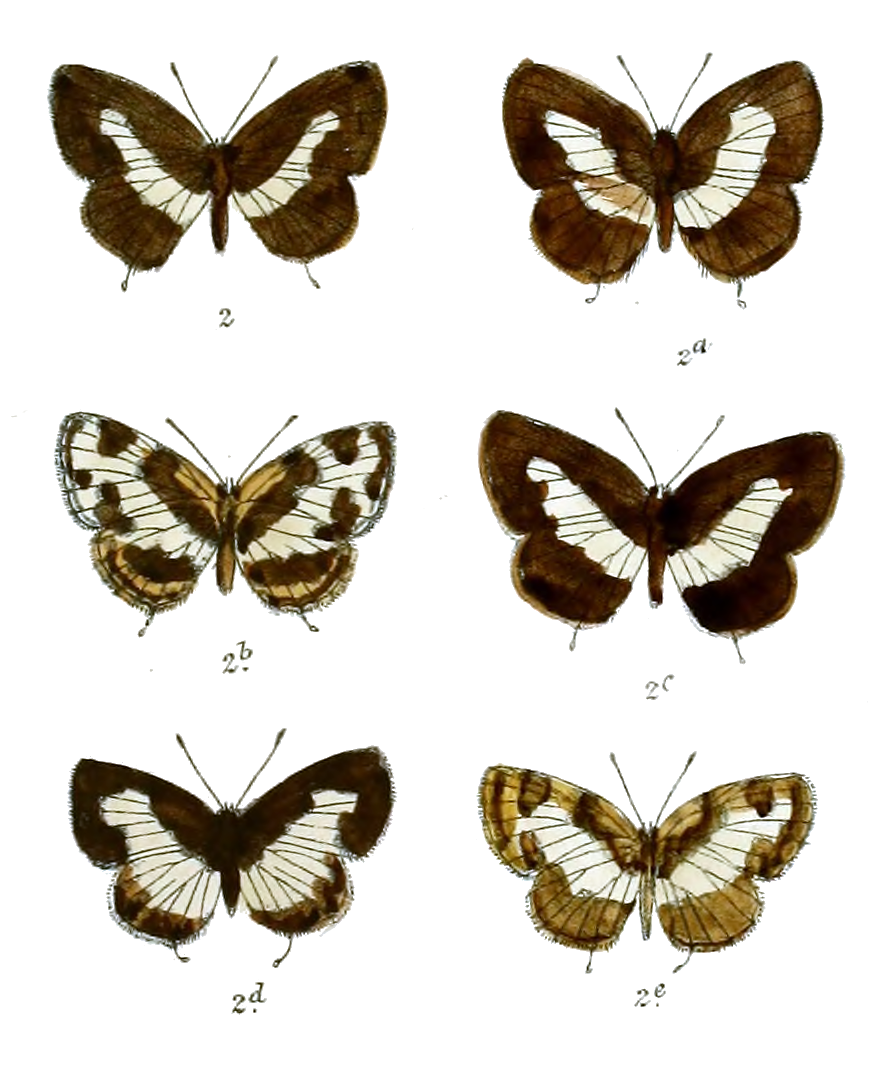

== Description ==
Upperside: black; a medial broad oblique white band across both forewings and hindwings broadening on the latter, on the forewing it extends further towards the costa in the female than in the male and in most specimens, both male and female, it is slightly produced outwards above vein three.

Underside: white with the following black markings: a broad band, broader than in any of the other forms, from base of hindwing produced obliquely across the forewing as far as the discocellular veinlets, thence bent at right angles and extended to the costal margin; beyond this the discal markings on both forewings and hindwings much as in Caleta roxus, but the terminal markings narrow and more or less obsolescent, the apex of the forewing however, is more broadly black, while the subterminal line of linear white spots on the same wing and the transverse subterminal series of black lunules on the hindwing are more or less obsolescent. Antennae, head, thorax and abdomen black; beneath: the shafts of the antennae speckled with white, the palpi, thorax and abdomen with a longitudinal medial white line, the sides of the abdomen barred with white.

== Range ==
The butterfly occurs in India from Orissa, Sikkim to Assam Andamans and onto Myanmar, Thailand, Laos, Hainan, southern Yunnan. The butterfly extends southwards to Peninsular Malaysia, Singapore, Borneo, Karimata, Sumatra, Bangka and Palawan.

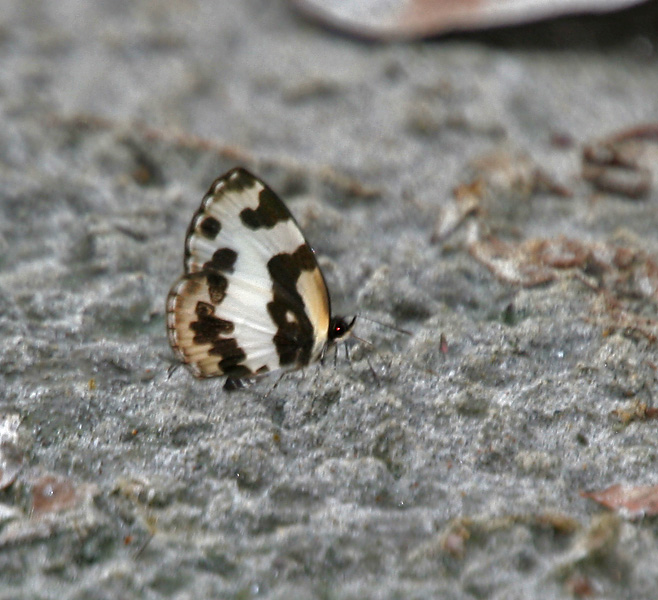
At Jayanti in Buxa Tiger Reserve in Jalpaiguri district of West Bengal, India.
