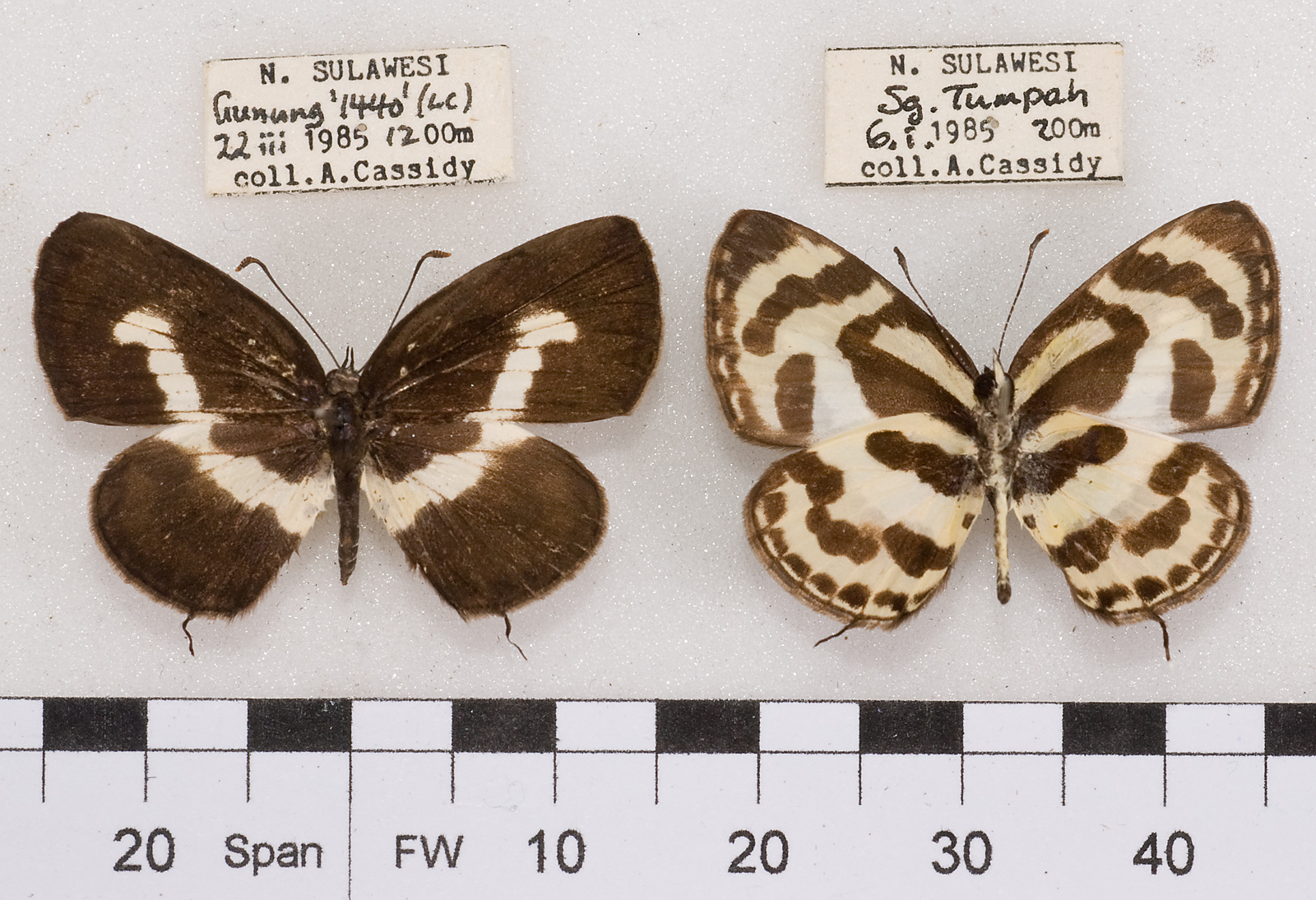
- Set specimens, Sulawesi

Conservation status
- Least Concern (IUCN 3.1)

Scientific classification
- Kingdom: Animalia
- Phylum: Arthropoda
- Clade: Pancrustacea
- Class: Insecta
- Order: Lepidoptera
- Family: Lycaenidae
- Genus: Caleta
- Species: C. caleta

Binomial name
- Caleta caleta (Hewitson, 1876)

Synonyms
- Lycaena caleta Hewitson, 1876; Castalius caleta Fruhstorfer, 1918

= Caleta caleta =

Angled Pierrot

Species of butterfly

Caleta caleta, the angled Pierrot, is a species of blue butterfly found in Sulawesi.

== Description ==
The male's upperside is dark brownish black, a broad medial oblique white band across both forewings and hindwings, not extended on the forewing above vein 5, above vein 3 produced shortly outwards and downwards into a hook-like form. Underside: white with the following black markings: On forewing a short, outwardly-pointed, oblique, clavate (club-shaped) streak from base joined below to a semi-circular broad band that reaches the costa; a short, outwardly oblique, upper discal bar, its outer edge generally emarginate; the apex, the termen narrowly, a large irregular sub-quadrate spot touching it in the middle and a very large inwardly oblique irregular spot or mark close to the tornus. On the hindwing: a hook-shaped mark at base sometimes slender; an inwardly oblique short clavate bar from apex, three coalescent spots extended outwards from the dorsum above the tornus formed into a sinuate (sinuous) irregular mark; a spot further outwards in interspace 4; a terminal series of slender lunules and an ancillary fine line. Antennae, head, thorax and abdomen black; beneath: the palpi, thorax and abdomen white.

Female. Similar to the male on both upper and under sides, but on the former the white medial band is narrower, on the latter the black markings are broader. Antennae, head, thorax and abdomen as in the male.

== Range ==
The butterfly is found in southern Sulawesi, Basilan, and Mindanao.

== Habits ==
The butterfly flies rapidly, close to the ground visiting low flying bushes. Found along nullahs and shady paths. It visits damp patches.

The species is found in jungle and lightly forested country with moderate to heavy precipitation.

== Life history ==
=== Larva ===
"Feeds on the tender leaves of the chorna (Zizyphus rugosa) .... pale green, of the usual woodlouse form, with the head concealed under the second segment. The whole body is more or less pubescent and there is a fringe of longer hairs on each side." (Davidson and Aitken quoted in Bingham, 1907)

=== Pupa ===
"Short and stout, constricted between the thorax and abdomen, clothed with short hair, closely attached by tail and band to any convenient surface; colour ochreous mottled with brown." (Davidson and Aitken quoted in Bingham, 1907).

Similar to that of Castalius ethion but has two green bands on the back.

=== Imago ===
Dry-season form is smaller with less prominent markings.

=== Food plant ===
- Zizyphus rugosa, Rhamnaceae.

== See also ==
- Caleta decidia, a blue butterfly species
- List of butterflies of India (Lycaenidae)
