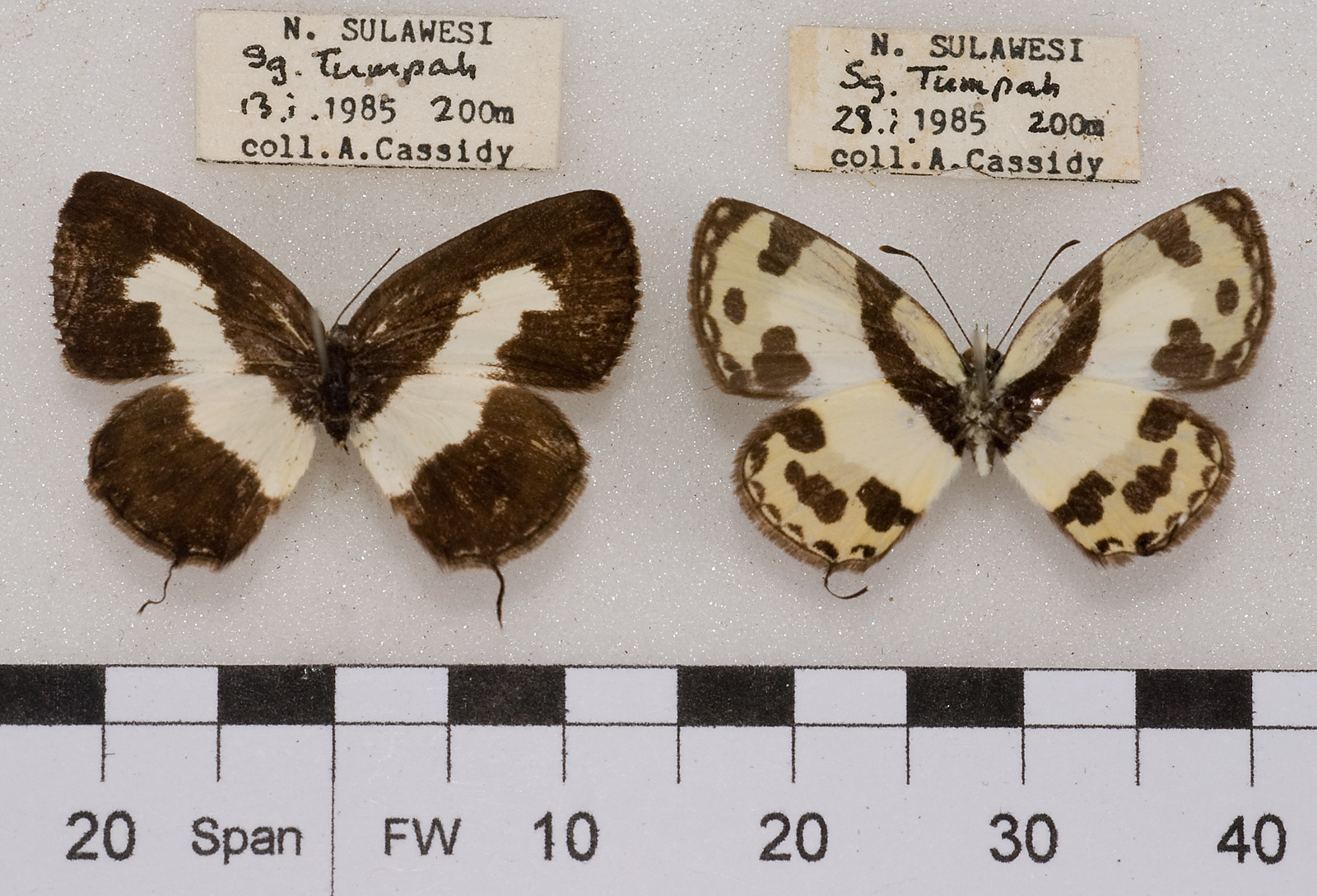

Scientific classification
- Domain: Eukaryota
- Kingdom: Animalia
- Phylum: Arthropoda
- Class: Insecta
- Order: Lepidoptera
- Family: Lycaenidae
- Genus: Caleta
- Species: C. celebensis

Binomial name
- Caleta celebensis Staudinger, 1889

= Caleta celebensis =

Species of butterfly

Caleta celebensis is a species of butterfly of the family Lycaenidae. It is found in southeastern Sulawesi.
