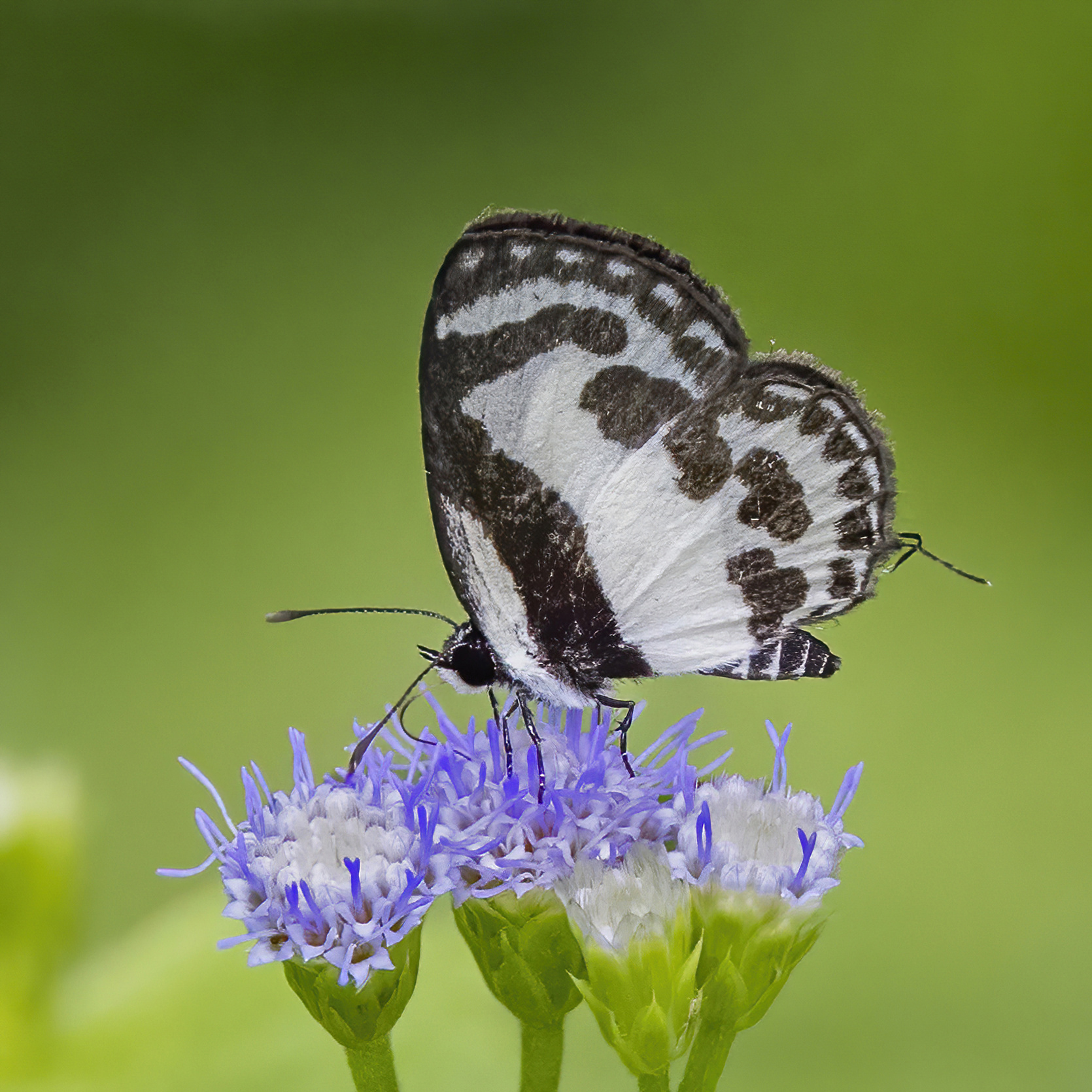
- C. r. pothus, Thailand

Scientific classification
- Domain: Eukaryota
- Kingdom: Animalia
- Phylum: Arthropoda
- Class: Insecta
- Order: Lepidoptera
- Family: Lycaenidae
- Genus: Caleta
- Species: C. roxus

Binomial name
- Caleta roxus (Godart, [1824])

Synonyms
- Polyommatus roxus Godart, [1824]; Castalius roxus; Pycnophallium roxus

= Caleta roxus =

Straight Pierrot

Species of butterfly

Caleta roxus, the straight Pierrot, is a small butterfly that belongs to the lycaenids or blues family. It is found in India and Southeast Asia.

== Description ==
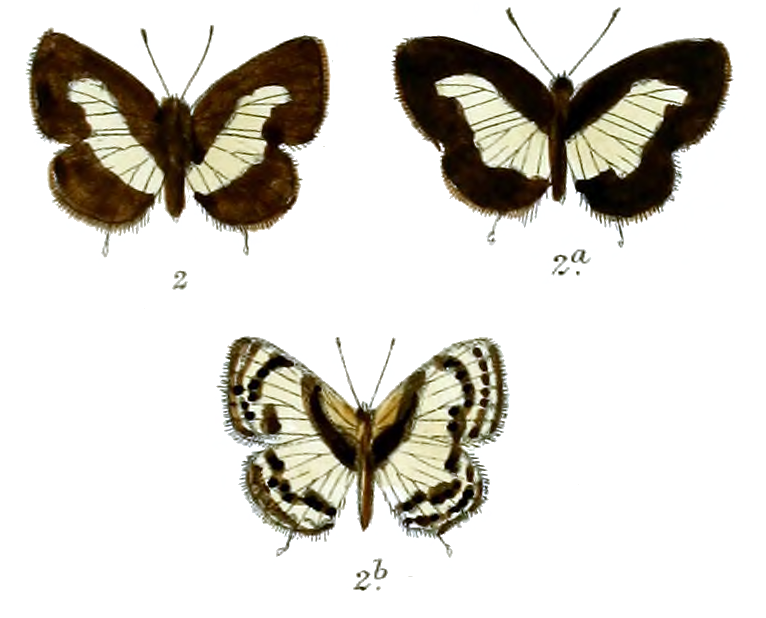

Male has the upperside black with an oblique medial white band on the forewings and hindwings. The band extends from above vein 5 on the forewing and the dorsum of the hindwing. On the forewing it is extended outwards slightly above vein 3, the apex of this extension square. Underside: white suffused slightly with pale yellow, with the following black markings: a comparatively broad, even, straight band across the base of the hindwing which is continued obliquely on to and across the forewing to the middle of the costa, there it is joined by a narrow edging on the costal margin to an irregular, upper, discal, outwardly oblique, short transverse bar which is broadest on the costa; posteriorly in a line with this bar is a small, transversely elongate, oval spot in interspace 3 and below en echelon with the latter two larger coalescent spots, one above the other, in interspaces 1 and 2; terminal margin with an even transverse band, its inner edge slightly crenulate (scalloped), medially traversed by a series of minute linear white spots. Hindwing: a transverse, discal, very irregular band widely interrupted in the middle; two coalescent spots beyond transversely across interspaces 4 and 5, followed by a subterminal, complete, curved series of distinct lunules that are edged slenderly on the outer side with white, and a prominent anteciliary white line. Cilia of both forewings and hindwings brown; filamentous short tail to latter black tipped with white. Antennae, head, thorax and abdomen black, the abdomen barred with white on the sides; beneath: the palpi, thorax and abdomen medially white.

Female closely resembles the male, but on the upperside, the medial, broad, oblique white band that crosses the wings is distinctly broader and on the forewing extends farther towards the costa in a point, while on the hindwing there is in addition, in many specimens, a subterminal complete transverse series of linear white dots. On the underside the black markings are broader; on the forewing the upper discal short oblique black bar is produced to and coalesces with the black spot in interspace 3; on the hindwing the discal transverse black band is very irregular but nearly continuous by the junction of its upper portion with the spots in interspaces 4 and 5; terminal markings on both wings as in the male. Antennae, head, thorax and abdomen similar to those of the male.

== Range ==
The butterfly occurs in India from Assam to Myanmar and across to Yunnan, Thailand, Cambodia and Indochina. It occurs right across Peninsular Malaysia, the Indonesian and Philippines archipelagos right across to New Guinea.
