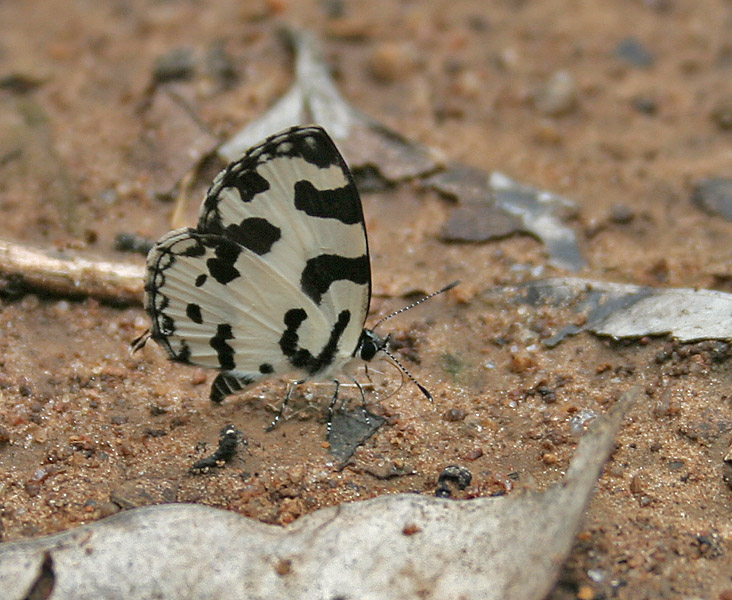
- Angled Pierrot (Caleta decidia) in Talakona forest, Andhra Pradesh, India
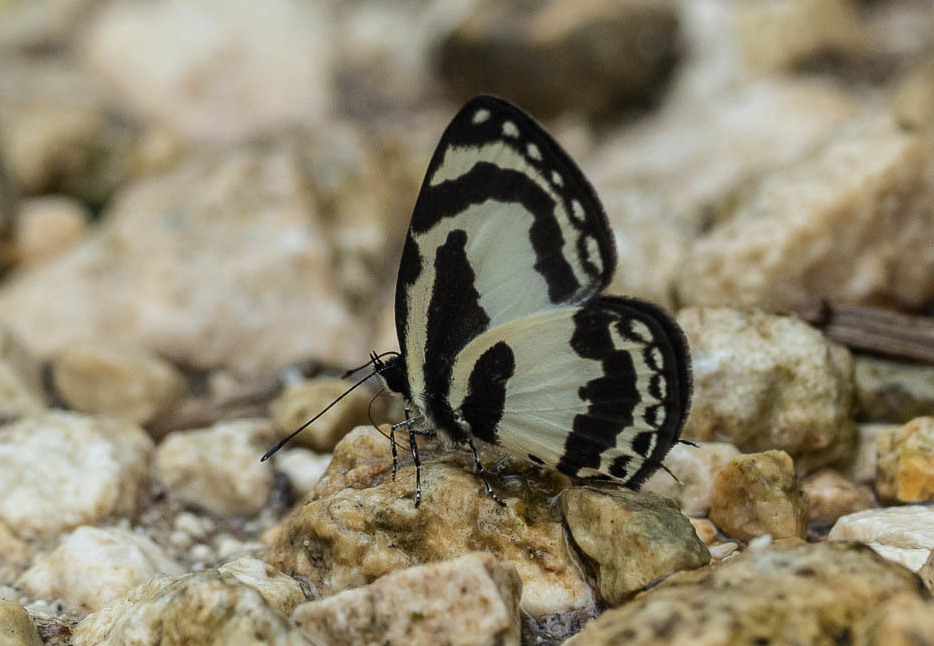
- Caleta argola in Mindanao

Scientific classification
- Kingdom: Animalia
- Phylum: Arthropoda
- Class: Insecta
- Order: Lepidoptera
- Family: Lycaenidae
- Subfamily: Polyommatinae
- Tribe: Polyommatini
- Genus: Caleta; Fruhstorfer, 1922

= Caleta (butterfly) =

Butterfly genus in family Lycaenidae

Caleta is a genus of butterflies in the family Lycaenidae, mainly found in Southeast Asia. The common name Pierrot is used for some species.

== Species ==
In his generic classification of the Polyommatini, Toshiya Hirowatari included nine species in Caleta:

- Caleta argola (Hewitson), [1876] Philippine Islands
- Caleta caleta (Hewitson), [1876]
- Caleta celebensis (Staudinger), 1889
- Caleta decidia (Hewitson), [1876]
- Caleta elna (Hewitson), [1876]
- Caleta manovus (Fruhstorfer), 1918 Borneo
- Caleta mindarus (C. & R. Felder), [1865] New Guinea, New Britain
- Caleta rhode (Hopffer), 1871 Lesser Sunda Islands, Sulawesi, Buru, Banggai, Timor
- Caleta roxus (Godart), [1824]

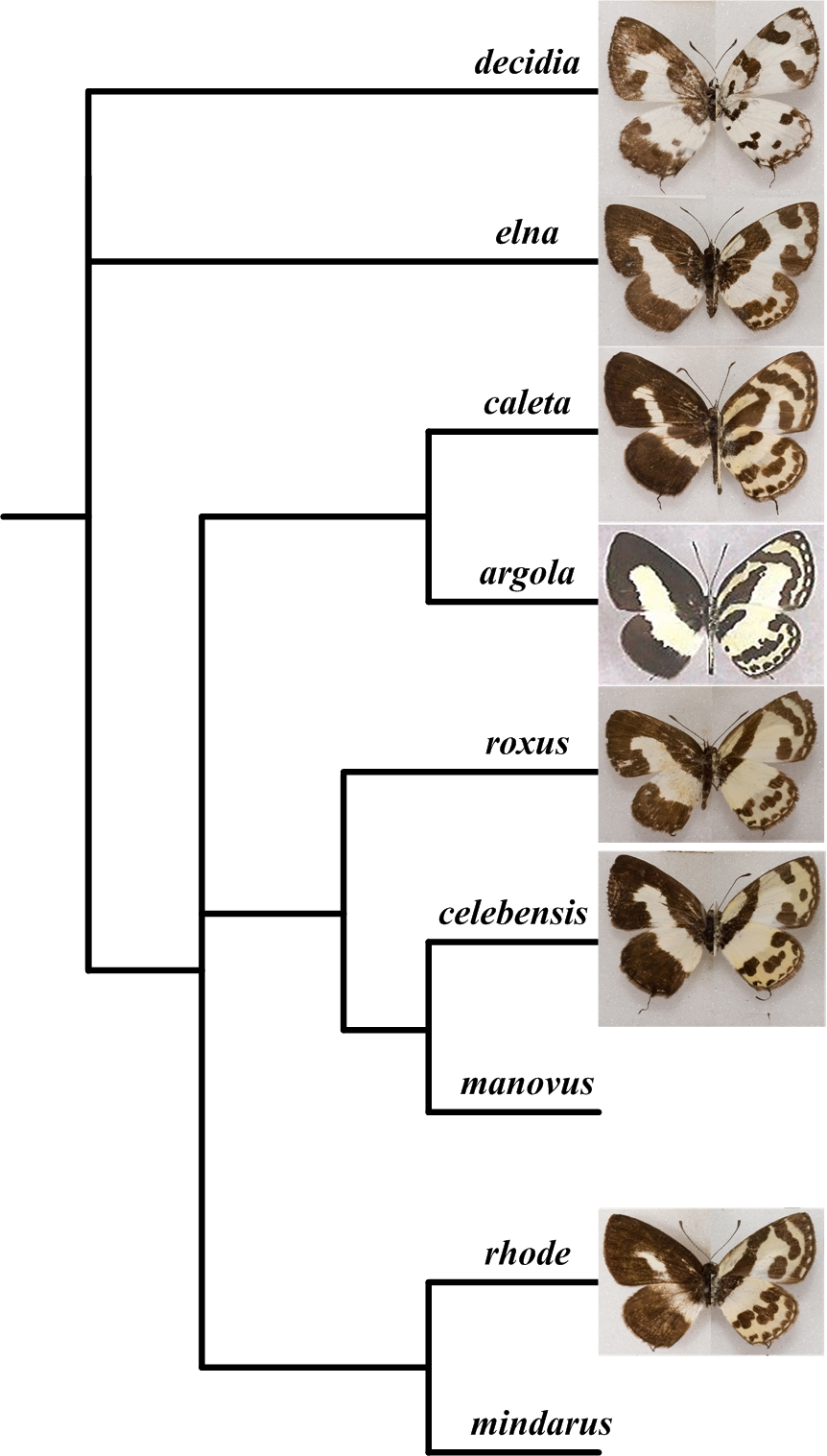
Cladistics of Caleta after Hirowatari, 1992

== Ecology ==
Recorded host plants include Ziziphus oenoplia (Rhamnaceae).

== Taxonomy ==
The genus Caleta was erected by Hans Fruhstorfer in 1922 in Adalbert Seitz's Die Gross-Schmetterlinge der Erde (The Macrolepidoptera of the World).

Another genus-level name, Pycnophallium, was erected by the Dutch lepidopterist Lambertus Johannes Toxopeus in 1929. He included two Oriental species under this name: Pycnophallium roxus Godart and Pycnophallium elna Hewitson. These species had previously been treated as species in the genera Lycaena or Castalius until Hans Fruhstorfer erected Caleta in 1922. Although Caleta in the wide sense has not been fully revised since Fruhstorfer erected it, Hirowatari, 1992, made an authoritative classification of Oriental polyommatine genera. Hirowatari did not recognise Pycnophallium as a valid genus, but retained nine species, including roxus and elna in Caleta.
