= La Caleta Field =

Airport in the Dominican Republic

La Caleta Airport
- IATA: none; ICAO: MDVA

Summary
- Airport type: Aerodrome
- Location: La Romana
- Elevation AMSL: 198 ft / 56 m

Runways
| Direction | Length | | Surface |
| Direction | ft | m | Surface |
|---|---|---|---|
| | 155 | 60 | Unpathed |

La Calata Airport or Vista Alegre Airport is located in La Caleta, La Romana, Dominican Republic. This is a little airport that serves to private aviation in the locality.

== See also ==
- La Caleta, Santo Domingo
- La Romana Province
- La Romana International Airport

== Sources ==
- Dominican Republic Airport Sign. Retrieved 30 December 2013.
