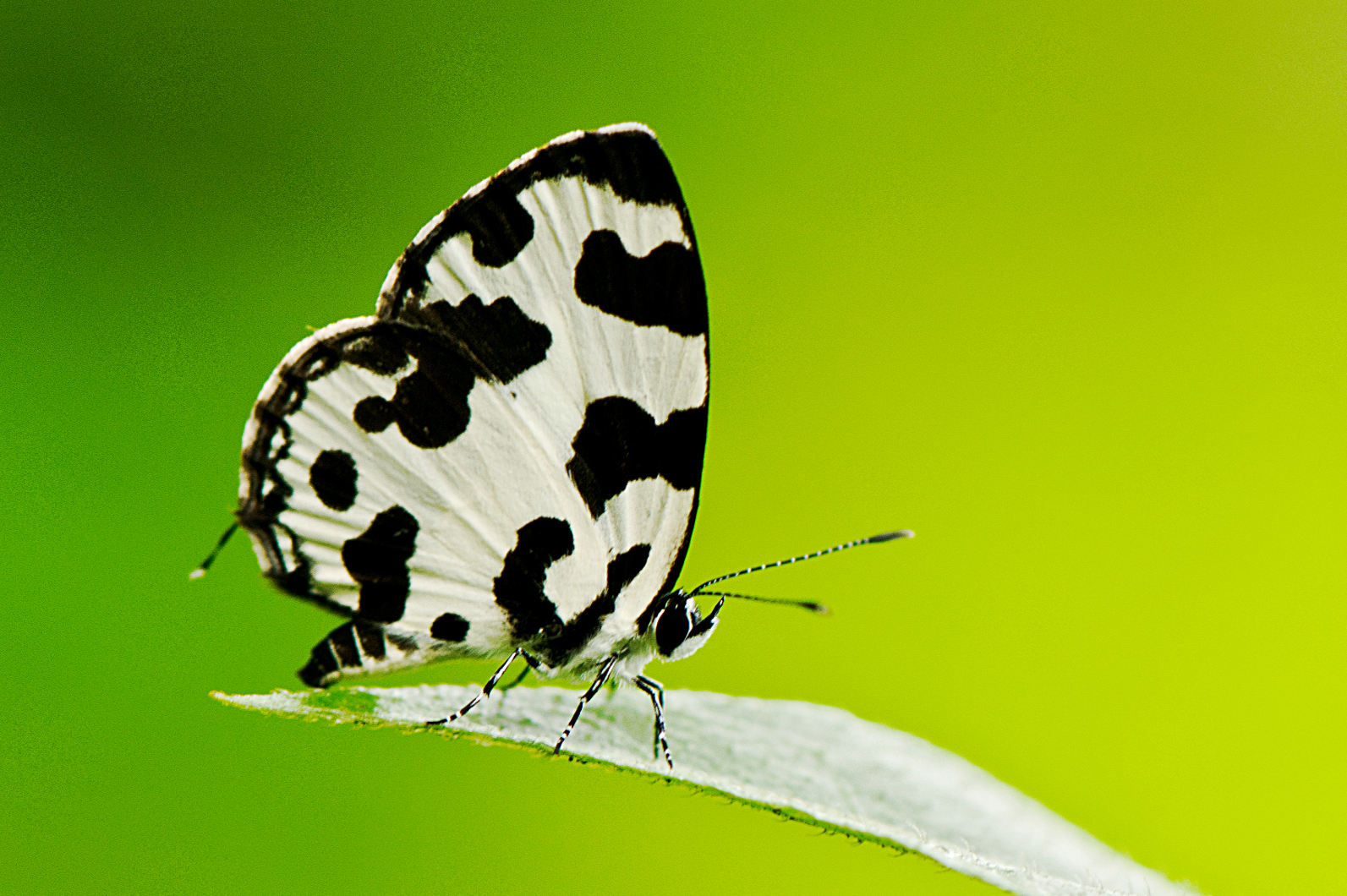

Scientific classification
- Kingdom: Animalia
- Phylum: Arthropoda
- Class: Insecta
- Order: Lepidoptera
- Family: Lycaenidae
- Genus: Caleta
- Species: C. decidia

Binomial name
- Caleta decidia (Hewitson, 1876)

Synonyms
- Lycaena decidia Hewitson, 1876; Castalius interruptus de Nicéville, [1884]; Castalius interruptus Moore, [1884]; Castalius decidia Moore, [1881]; Castalius caleta decidia Fruhstorfer, 1918

= Caleta decidia =

Angled Pierrot

Species of butterfly

Caleta decidia, the angled Pierrot, is a species of blue butterfly found in south Asia and southeast Asia.

== Description ==
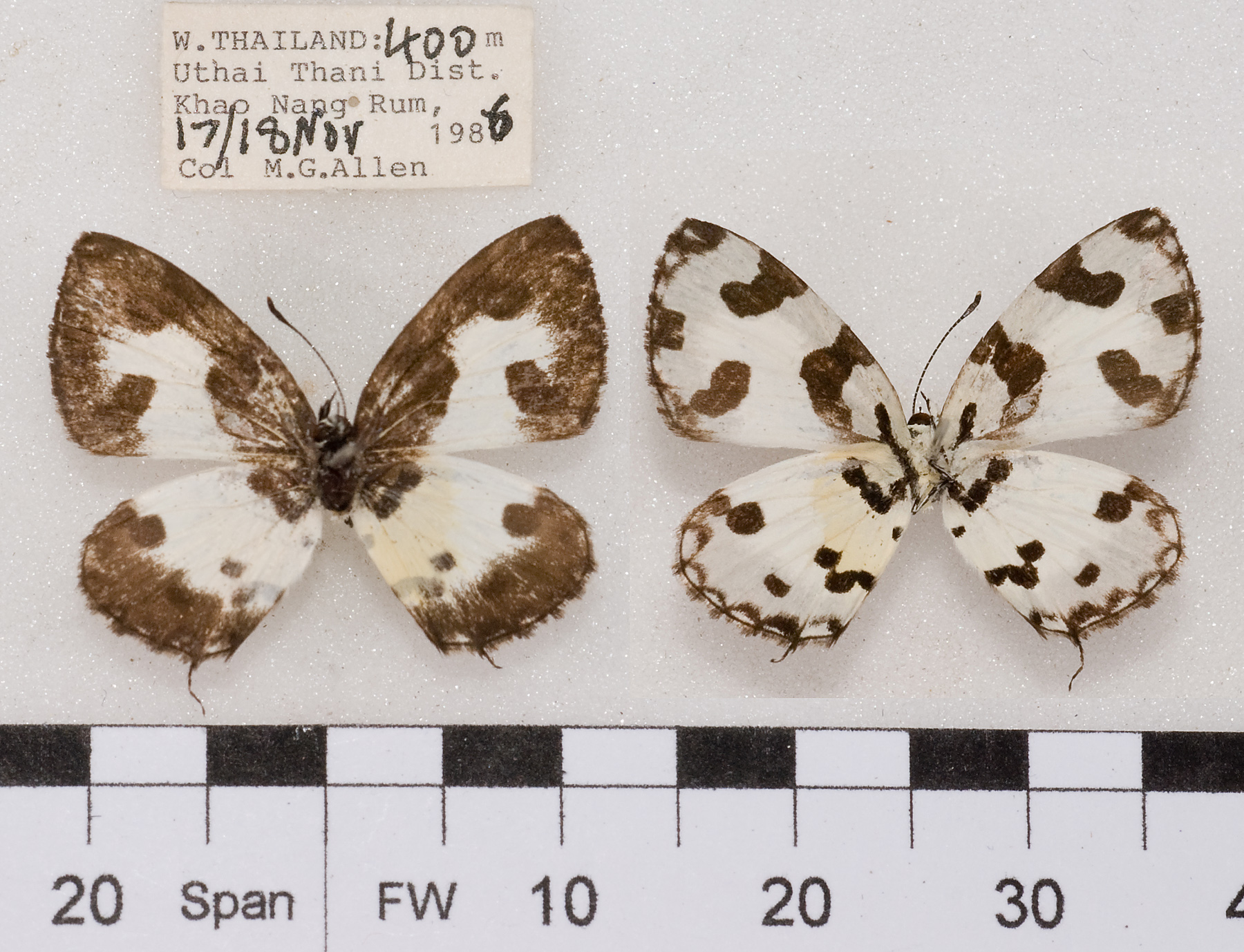

The male's upperside is dark brown. Both wings crossed by a common broad band of white commencing at the second discoidal nervure of the anterior wing where it projects towards the outer margin. Underside is white having anterior wing with a small spot at base, a band before the middle, a large spot on the costal margin near the apex, a large spot at the anal angle, the apex which is marked by two white spots, the outer margin and a spot at its middle, all dark brown. Posterior wing is with a band near the base, a small spot on the inner margin, a large spot below this, a bifid spot near the apex, a spot between this and a series of submarginal lunular spots, all dark brown.

Life cycle

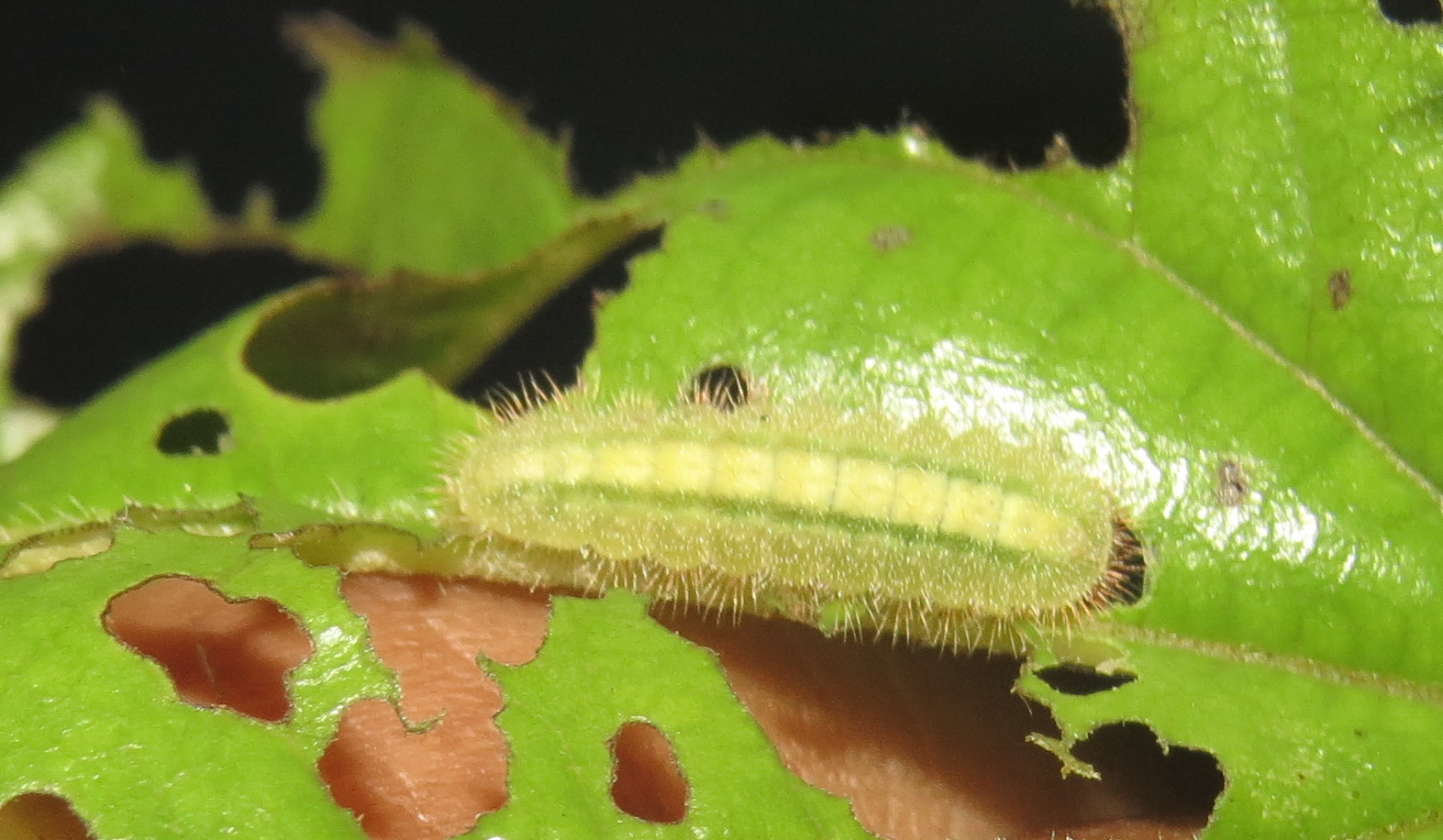
Larva

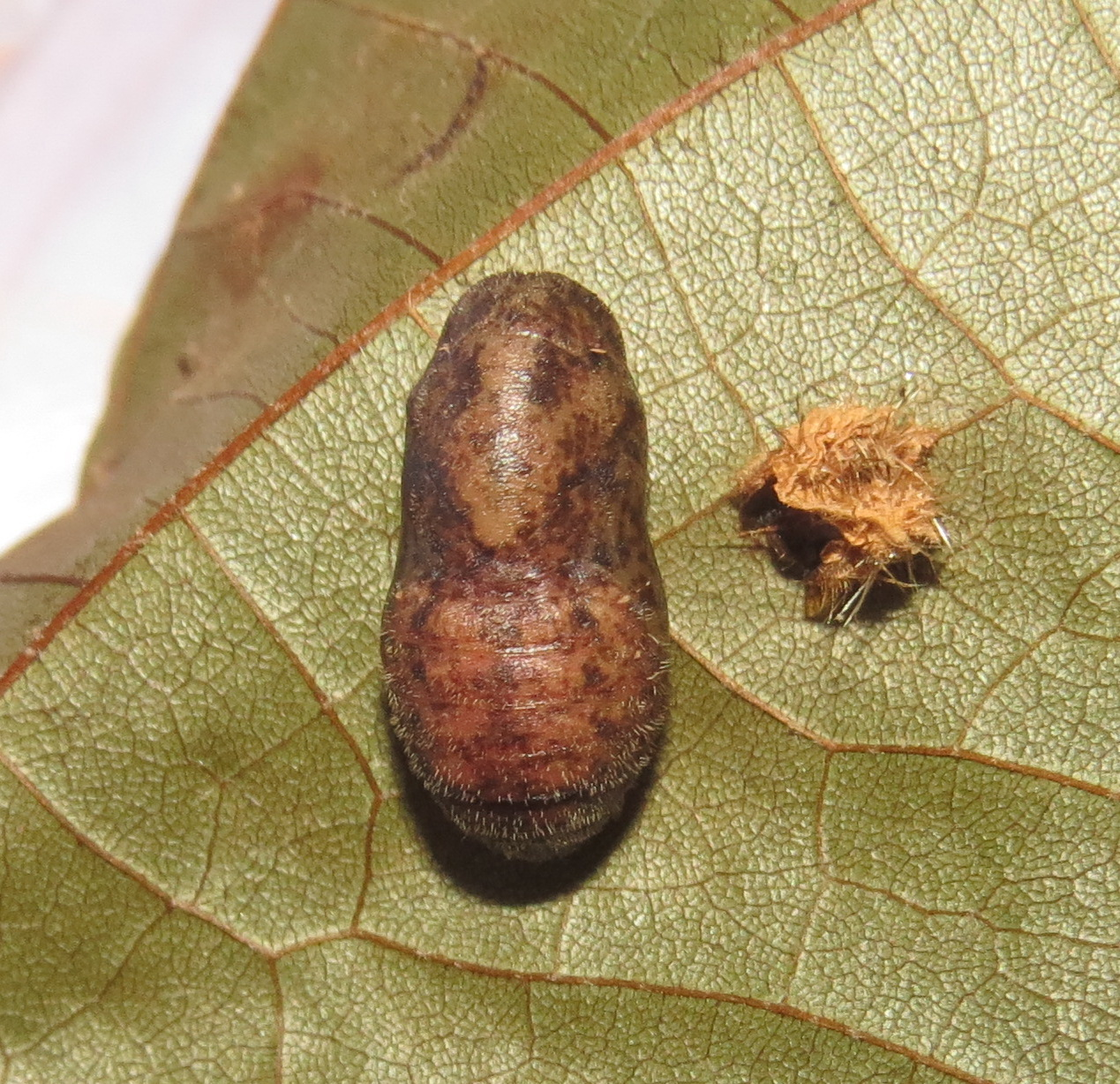
Chrysalis

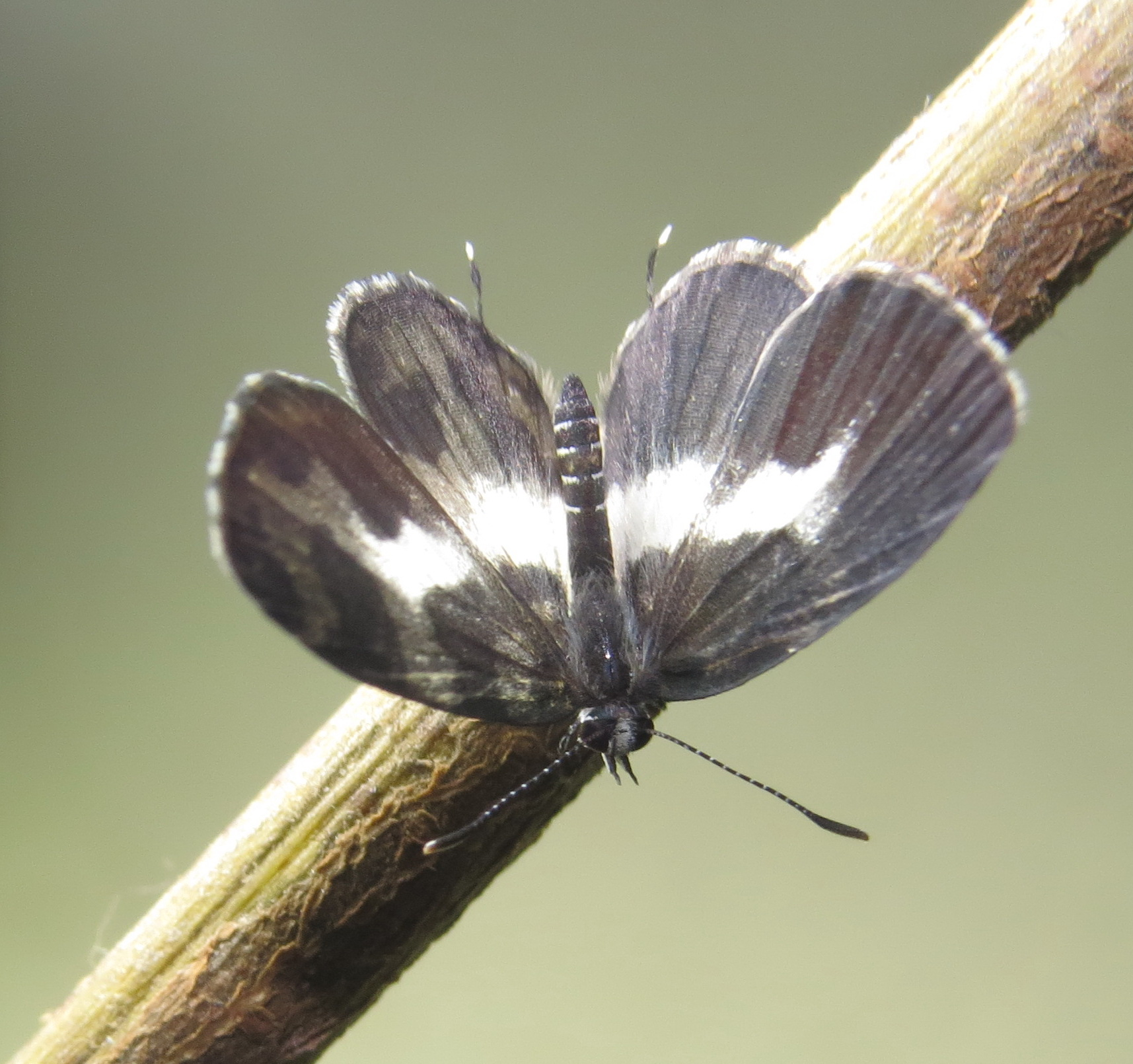
Imago (upperside)

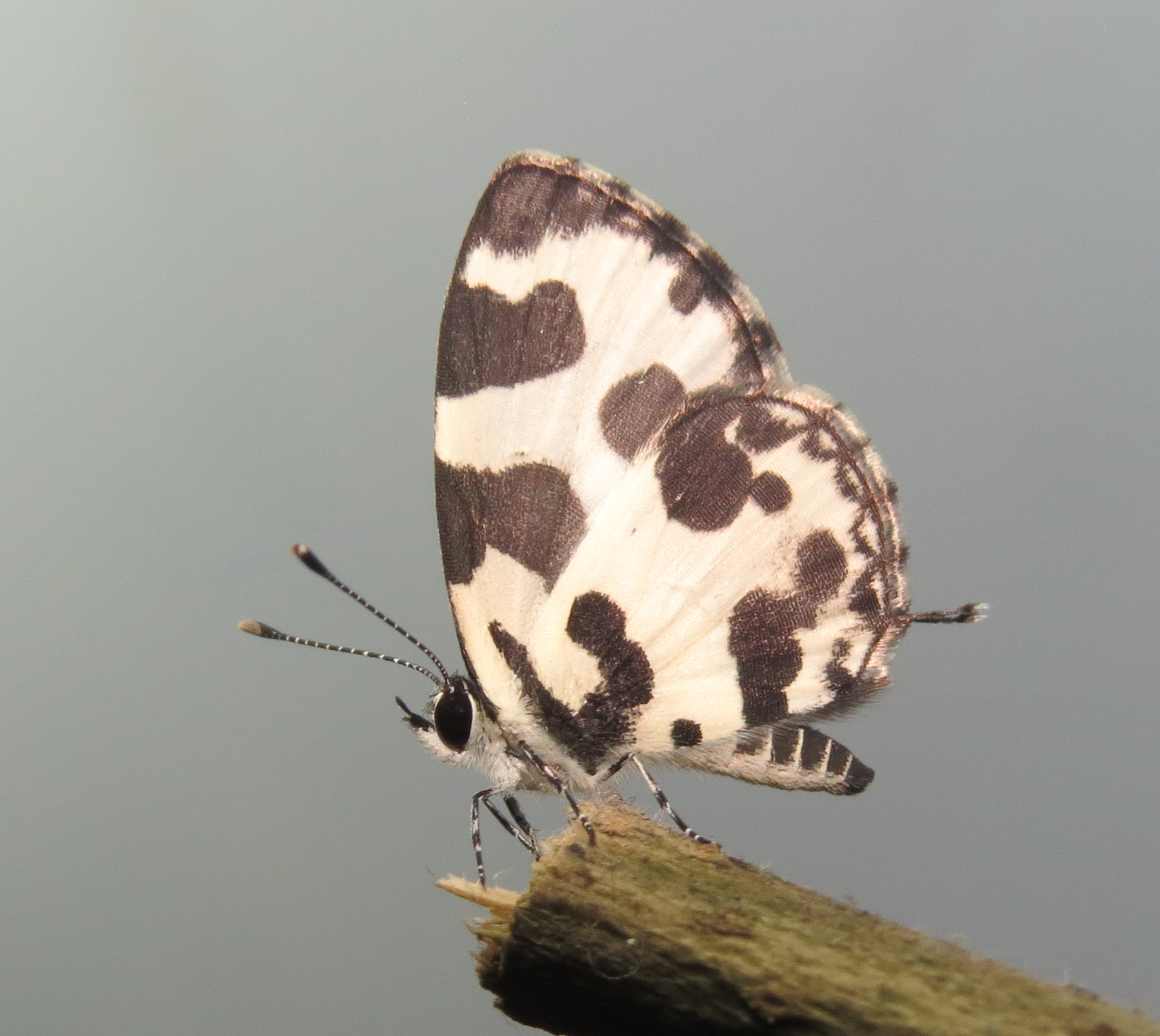
Imago (underside)

== Range ==
The butterfly is found in Myanmar, Thailand, Laos, Vietnam, Cambodia, Nepal and India.

== See also ==
- Caleta caleta, a blue butterfly species
- List of butterflies of India (Lycaenidae)
