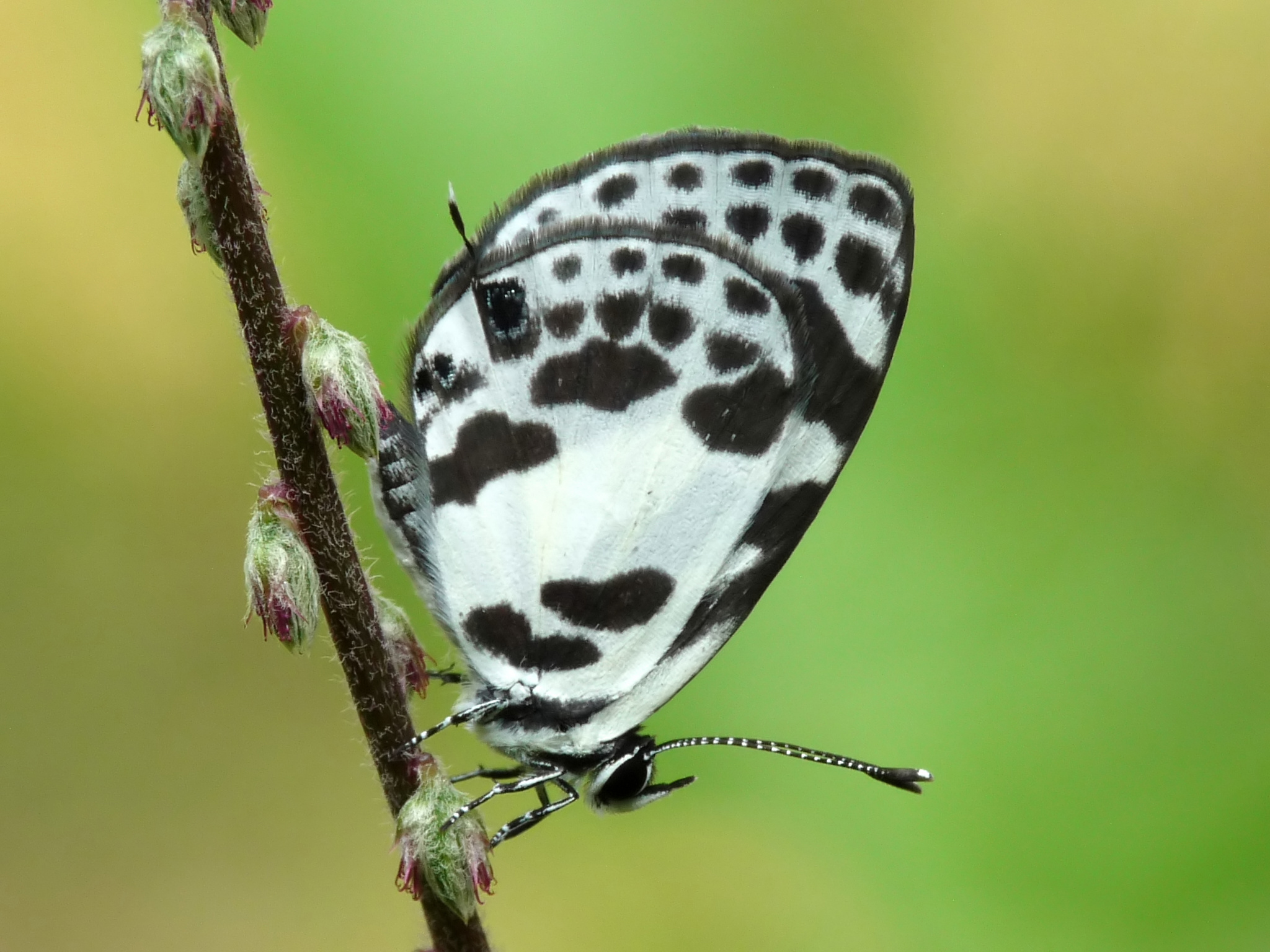

Scientific classification
- Kingdom: Animalia
- Phylum: Arthropoda
- Class: Insecta
- Order: Lepidoptera
- Family: Lycaenidae
- Genus: Discolampa
- Species: D. ethion

Binomial name
- Discolampa ethion (Westwood, 1851)

Synonyms
- Castalius ethion

= Discolampa ethion =

Banded blue Pierrot

Species of butterfly

Discolampa ethion, the banded blue Pierrot, is a contrastingly marked butterfly found in South Asia that belongs to the blues or family Lycaenidae. The species was first described by John O. Westwood in 1851.

== Description ==
The following description is taken from Charles Thomas Bingham Fauna of British India: Butterflies Volume II (1907).

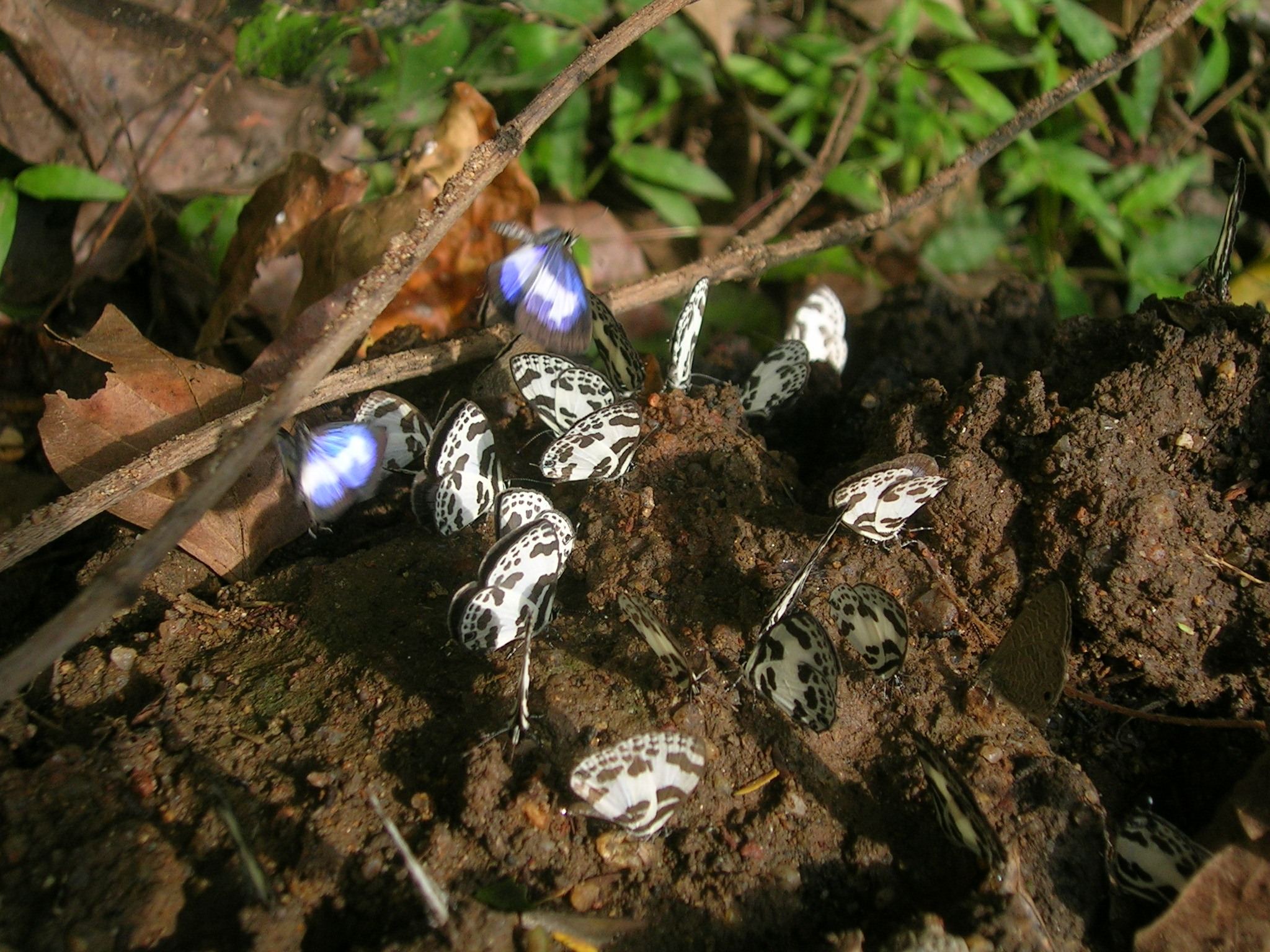
Mud-puddling in the Eastern Ghats

- Male. Upperside, forewings and hindwings: medially and obliquely crossed by a very broad pure white band that is broadly edged on its inner and outer margins by dark blue and does not extend on the forewing above vein 6, just above vein 3 it projects outwards for a short distance whence the inner margin of its dark blue edging is carried obliquely to vein 6; the extreme bases of the wings black; the costal margin of the fore and the terminal margins of both forewings and hindwings broadly black; on both wings a light iridescent blue suffusion from base outwards. Underside: snow-white. Forewings and hindwings: the following jet-black markings: Forewing: two broad more or less parallel streaks from base extended obliquely to the costa, the outer of the two apically curved and on the costa coalescent with the inner streak; costal margin very narrowly edged with black; an anterior, post-discal, outwardly oblique, short bar, slightly clavate posteriorly, extends between the costa and vein 5; opposing this there is between the dorsum and vein 3 a similar but erect and apically non-clavate bar; beyond these there is an inner and outer transverse complete subterminal series of spots followed by an anteciliary slender black line; the spots of the inner subterminal series quadrate, of the outer linear, the posterior two of the former very large; lastly, a single detached postdiscal spot in interspace 3 very close to the inner subterminal line of spots. Hindwing: a curved short basal band not extended to the costa, a spot touching it in the middle on the outer side and a discal transverse band twice widely interrupted, the middle portion shifted outwards, the lower portion with a spot on its outer margin joined to it; subterminal and terminal markings as on the forewing. Antennae, head, thorax and abdomen black; beneath: the palpi, thorax and abdomen with a median longitudinal white line.
- Female: Upperside: similar to that of the male but the median white transverse band across both wings broader, extended on the forewing up to vein 7 and with no inner edging of blue or iridescent light blue irroration; the black at the bases of the wings and on the margins not so intense in shade, more of a brownish black. Underside: ground colour and markings very similar, the basal two oblique bands on the forewing generally farther from one another than in the male.
- Larva. "The caterpillar, which feeds on young shoots of Ziziphus jujuba, is of the woodlouse form but flattened. Its texture though apparently smooth is, if looked at with a lens, found to be thickly covered with white hairs: its colour is greenish white with a faint green dorsal band."
- Pupa. "Similar in shape to that of Castalius rosimon, Fabricius, but smaller and narrower. It is of a bright apple-green with a darkish-green line down the centre. There are some small red dots on the edges of the wing-cases."
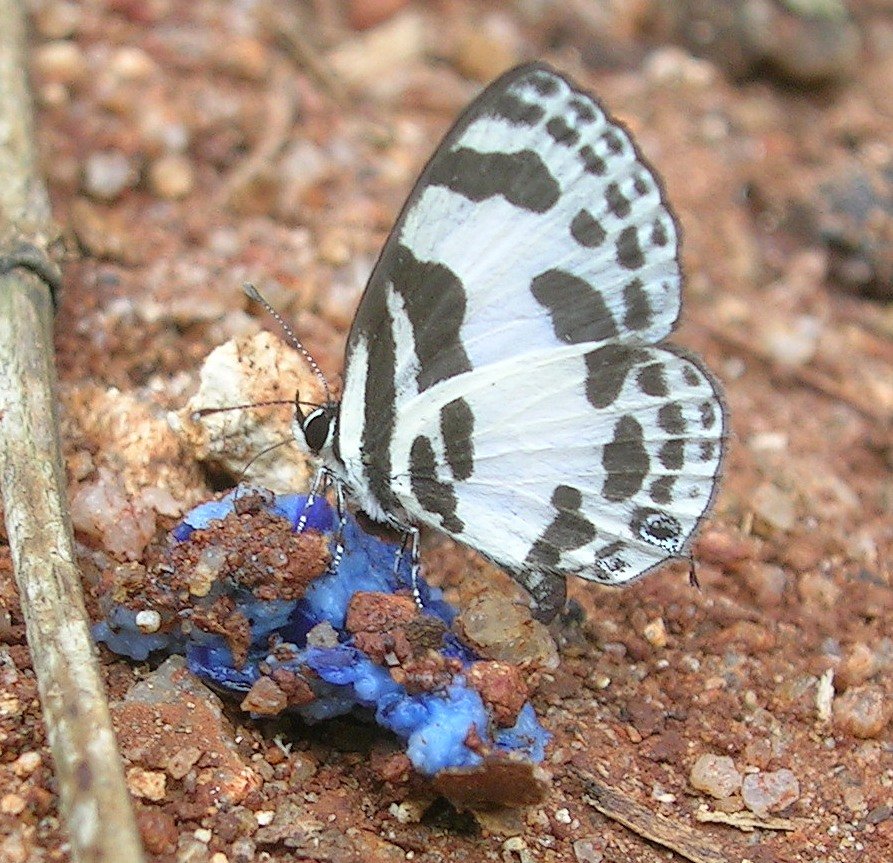
From the Eastern Ghats

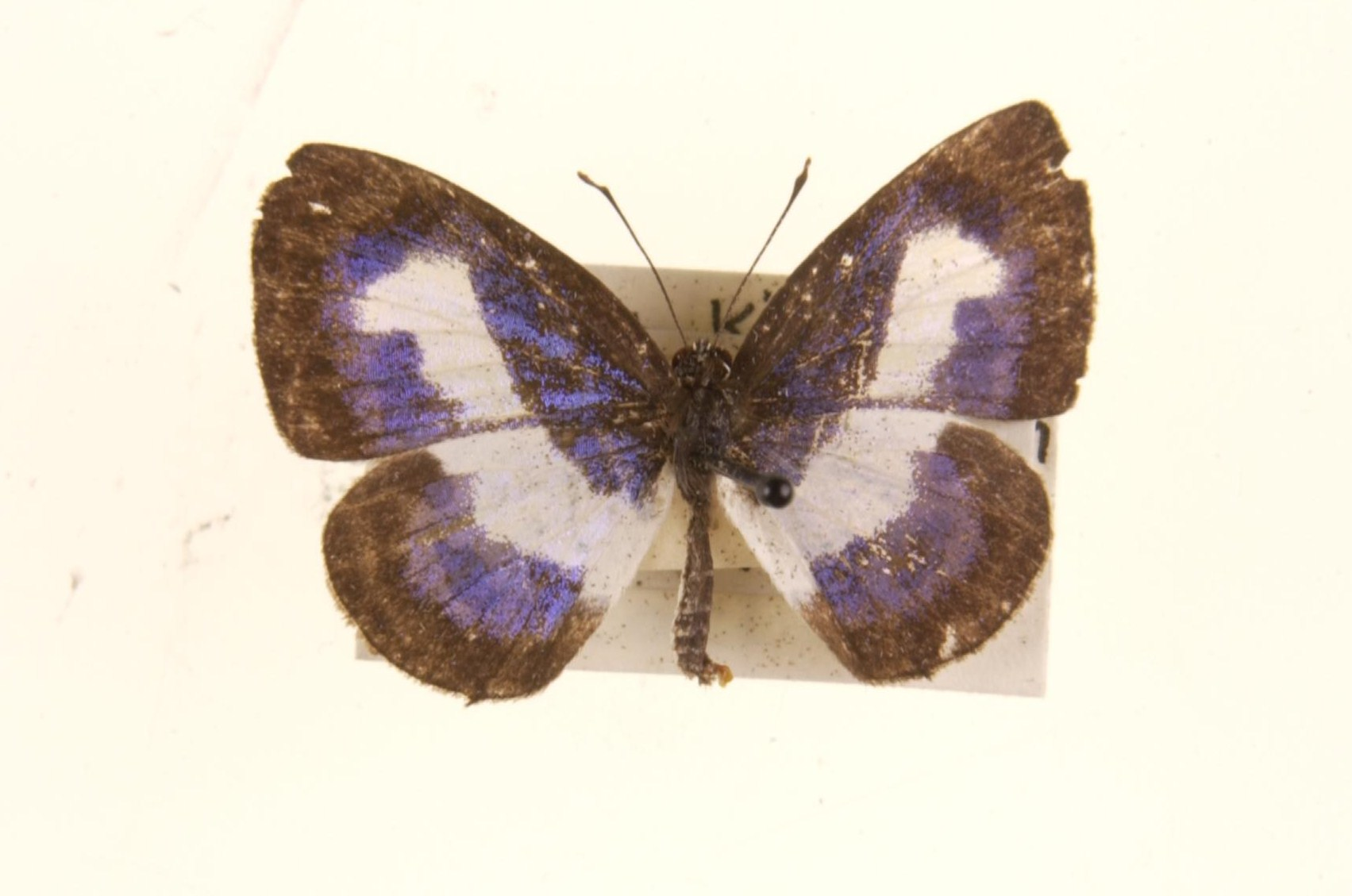
Male, upperside - museum specimens from Malaya

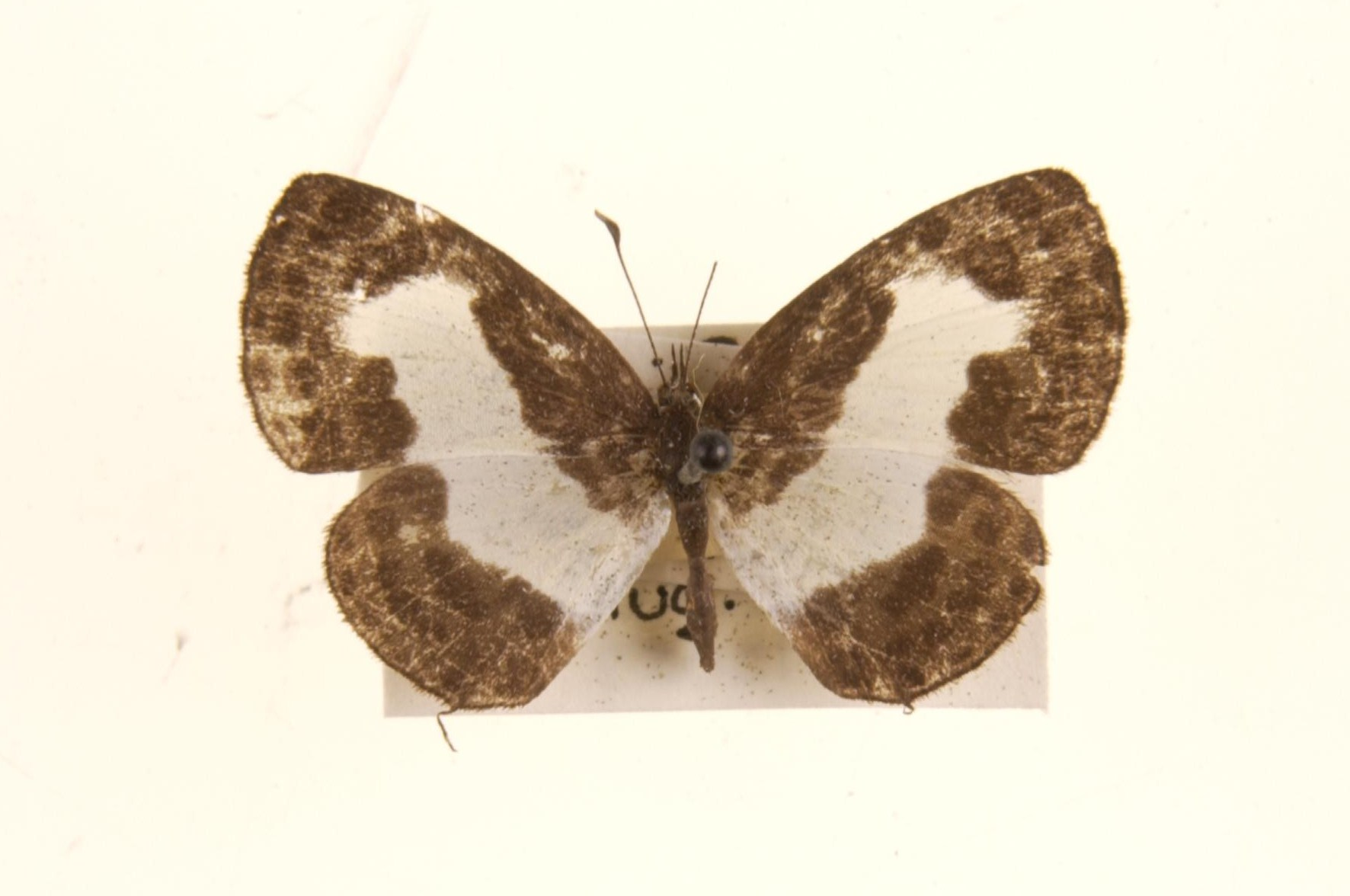
Female, upperside -museum specimens from Malaya

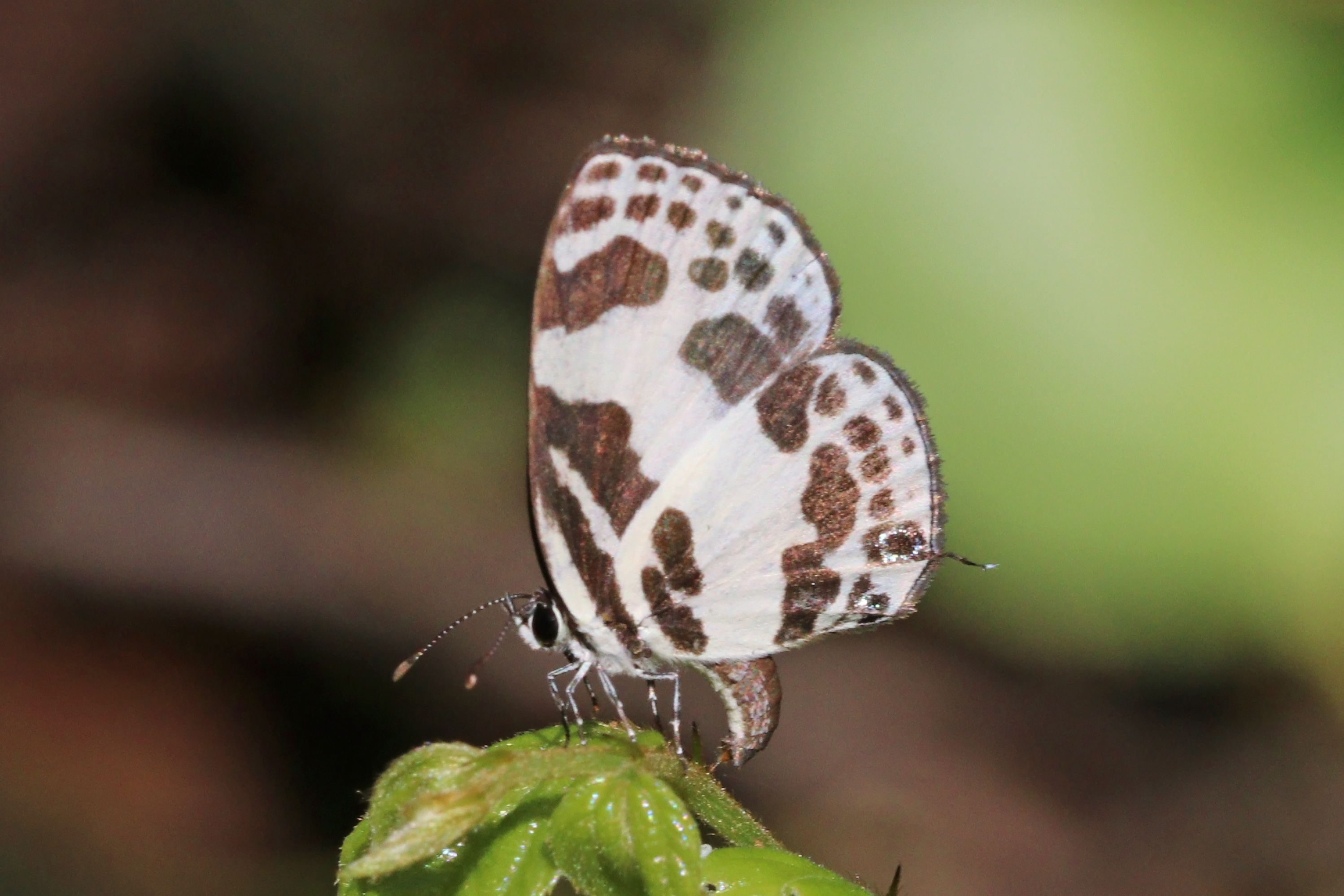
Laying egg, Chinnar Wildlife Sanctuary

== Range ==
The butterfly occurs in Sri Lanka, South India, Sikkim to Assam, and onto Myanmar. Also in the southern Andaman Islands and Nicobar Islands. In South East Asia, the butterfly is found in Cambodia, Thailand, Laos, Vietnam and Hainan, Malay Peninsula, Singapore, Sumatra, Java, Borneo, Philippines, Palawan, Nias, Sumbawa, Anambas Islands, and Sulawesi.
