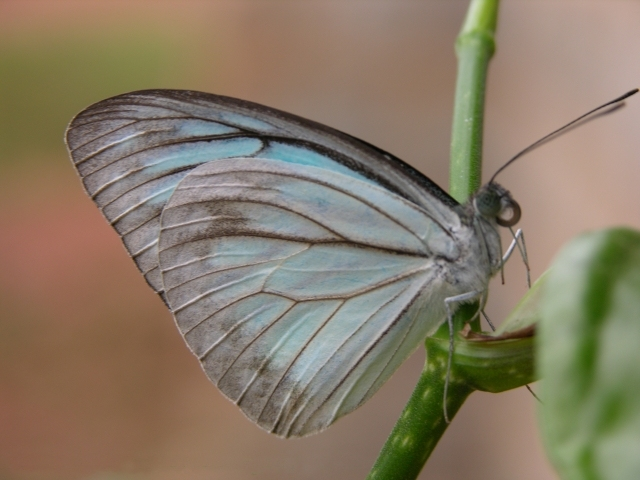
- Pareronia valeria

Scientific classification
- Kingdom: Animalia
- Phylum: Arthropoda
- Class: Insecta
- Order: Lepidoptera
- Family: Pieridae
- Tribe: Nepheroniini
- Genus: Pareronia; Bingham, 1907

Synonyms
- Valeria (preocc. Valeria)

= Pareronia =

Butterfly genus in family Pieridae

Pareronia is a genus of butterflies of the subfamily Pierinae within the family Pieridae. The species are found in Southeast Asia and are mimics of the Danainae genus Parantica.

== Species ==
- Pareronia argolis (Felder, C & R Felder, 1860)
- Pareronia avatar (Moore, [1858]) – pale wanderer
- Pareronia aviena Fruhstorfer, 1910
- Pareronia boebera (Eschscholtz, 1821)
- Pareronia ceylanica (Felder, C & R Felder, 1865) – dark wanderer
- Pareronia chinki Joicey & Noakes, 1915
- Pareronia gullussa (Fruhstorfer, 1910)
- Pareronia hippia (Fabricius, 1787) – Indian wanderer
- Pareronia jobaea (Boisduval, 1832) (or Pareronia iobaea)
- Pareronia kyokoae Nishimura, 1996
- Pareronia nishiyamai Yata, 1981
- Pareronia paravatar Bingham, 1907
- Pareronia phocaea (Felder, C & R Felder, 1861)
- Pareronia tritaea (Felder, C & R Felder, 1859)
- Pareronia valeria (Cramer, 1776) – common wanderer or Malayan wanderer
