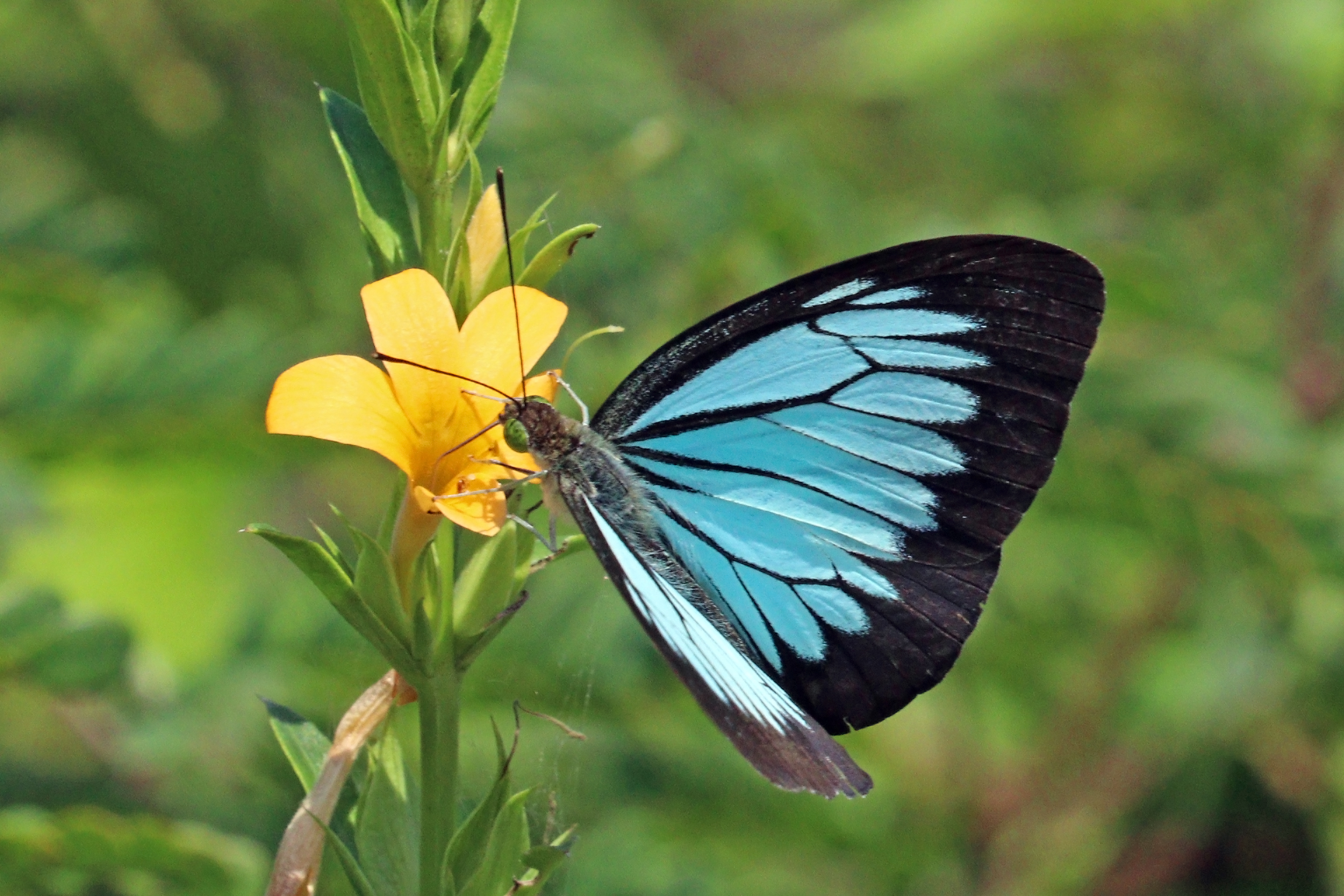
- Male; Chinnar Wildlife Sanctuary, Kerala, India

Scientific classification
- Kingdom: Animalia
- Phylum: Arthropoda
- Clade: Pancrustacea
- Class: Insecta
- Order: Lepidoptera
- Family: Pieridae
- Genus: Pareronia
- Species: P. ceylanica

Binomial name
- Pareronia ceylanica (C. & R. Felder, 1865)

= Pareronia ceylanica =

Dark wanderer

Species of butterfly

Pareronia ceylanica, the dark wanderer, is a medium-sized butterfly of the family Pieridae, that is, the yellows and whites. It is found in Sri Lanka and India.

== Description ==
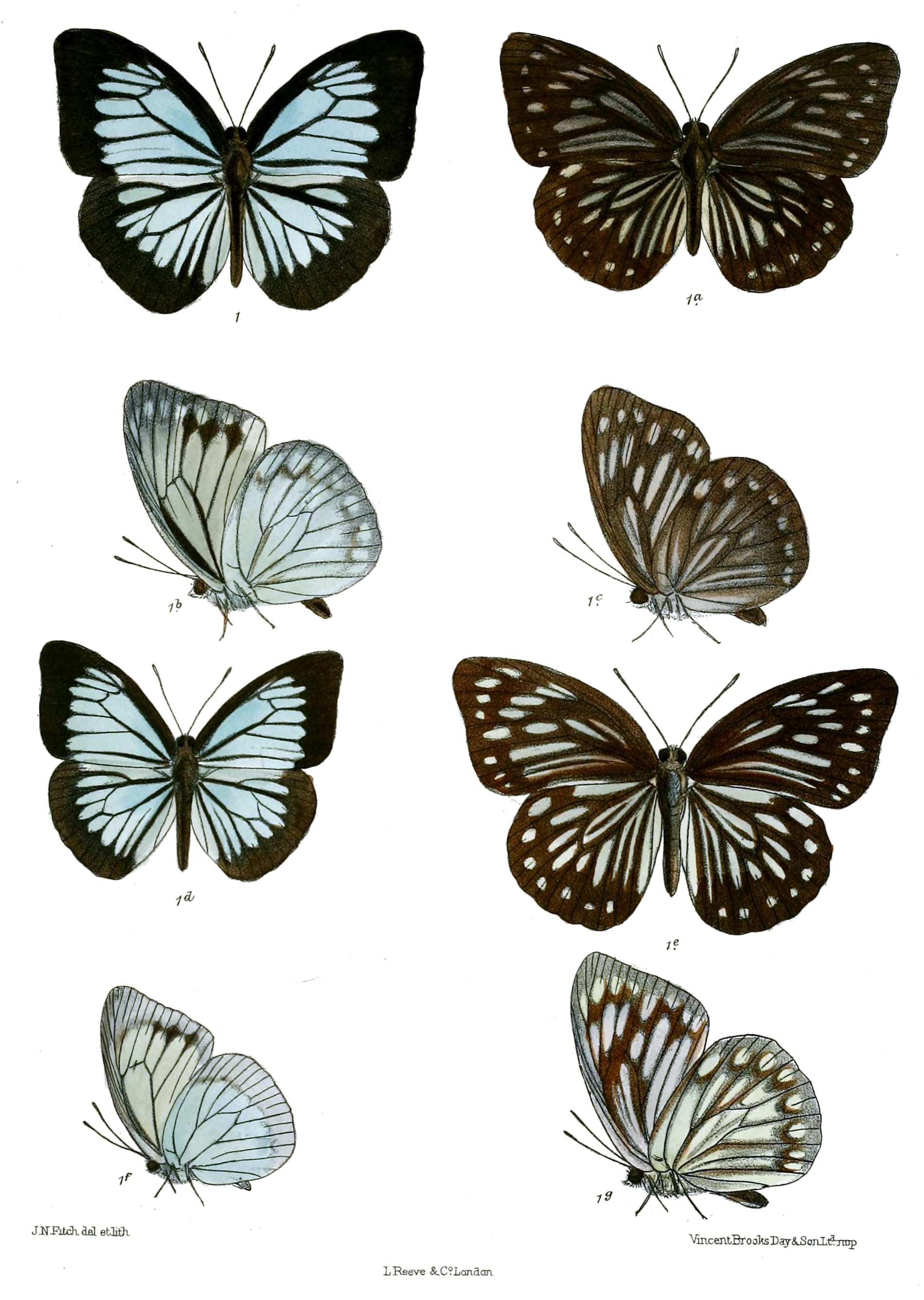

The dark wanderer resembles Pareronia valeria in colour and in the disposition of the markings, but differs as follows: Male upperside: ground colour a deeper blue. Forewing: the terminal black border much broader generally, entirely without the transverse sub-terminal series of bluish-white spots; in a few specimens there are one or two of these spots present, but nothing like the series so conspicuous in P. valeria hippia. Hindwing: the terminal black border very broad, narrowing slightly but distinctly towards the tornal angle. Proportionately this border is even broader than in the forewing. Underside: as in P. valeria. The female closely resembles the female of P. valeria, but on the upperside the outer black margins beyond the discal markings on both forewings and hindwings are proportionately much broader, the transverse subterminal series of spots that crosses the wing is further from the terminal edge. On the underside the terminal black borders are broader and darker, the subterminal series of spots on apex of the forewing and on the hindwing absent or so very thickly overlaid with the dusky brownish black of the terminal margin as to be very indistinct and blurred. Antennae, head, thorax and abdomen in both sexes much as in P. valeria hippia.

== Range ==
This species lives in southern India, the Western Ghats, the southern Andaman Islands and Sri Lanka.

== Larva ==
"Long, cylindrical or slightly depressed and tapering slightly from the head, which is large, to the tail which ends in two short strong spines clothed with bristles. The body is clothed with very minute hairs. Colour green, with a lateral row of conspicuous white spots from the 5th to the 12th segment and rows of smaller spots on the back. Food-plant, Capparis heyneana."

== Pupa ==
"Suspended by the tail and by a very long band ... thoracic portion bent back almost at right angles to the abdominal; head produced into a very long sharp snout; wing-cases forming a keel nearly half an inch in depth, and so thin as to be almost transparent. Colour uniform pale watery green." (Davidson & Aitken.)

== Other references ==
- Evans, W.H. (1932). The Identification of Indian Butterflies (2nd ed.). Mumbai, India: Bombay Natural History Society.
- Gaonkar, Harish (1996). Butterflies of the Western Ghats, India (including Sri Lanka) - A Biodiversity Assessment of a Threatened Mountain System. Bangalore, India: Centre for Ecological Sciences.
- Gay, Thomas; Kehimkar, Isaac David; Punetha, Jagdish Chandra (1992). Common Butterflies of India. Nature Guides. Bombay, India: World Wide Fund for Nature-India by Oxford University Press. ISBN 978-0195631647.
- Kunte, Krushnamegh (2000). Butterflies of Peninsular India. India, A Lifescape. Hyderabad, India: Universities Press. ISBN 978-8173713545.
- Wynter-Blyth, Mark Alexander (1957). Butterflies of the Indian Region. Bombay, India: Bombay Natural History Society. ISBN 978-8170192329.

== See also ==
- List of butterflies of India
- List of butterflies of India (Pieridae)
