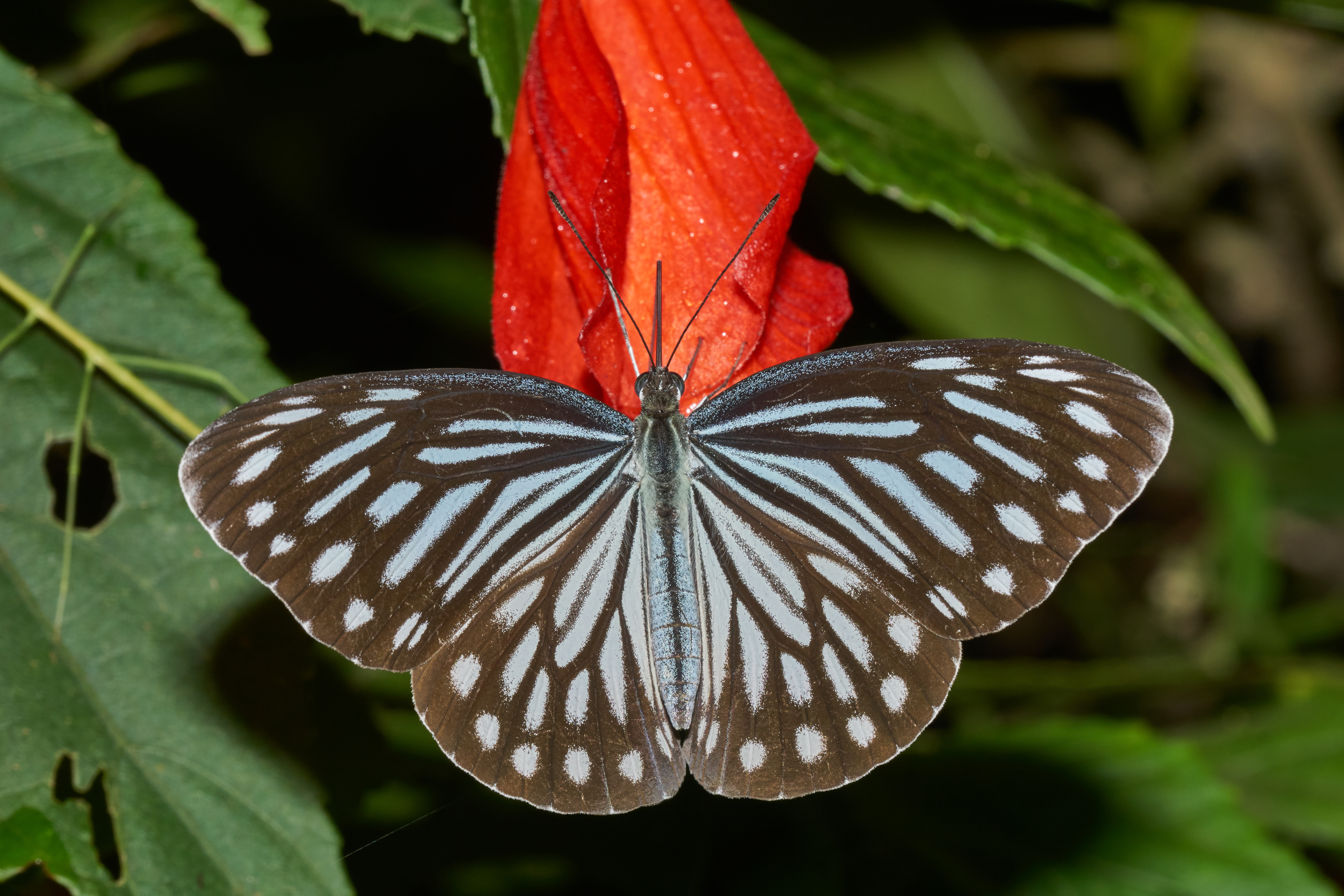
- Pareronia hippia

Scientific classification
- Kingdom: Animalia
- Phylum: Arthropoda
- Class: Insecta
- Order: Lepidoptera
- Family: Pieridae
- Subfamily: Pierinae
- Tribe: Nepheroniini; Braby, 2014

Genera
- Nepheronia; Pareronia

= Nepheroniini =

Tribe of butterflies

Nepheroniini is a tribe of butterflies within the family Pieridae and the subfamily Pierinae. It contains two genera:

- Nepheronia Butler, 1870
- Pareronia Bingham, 1907
