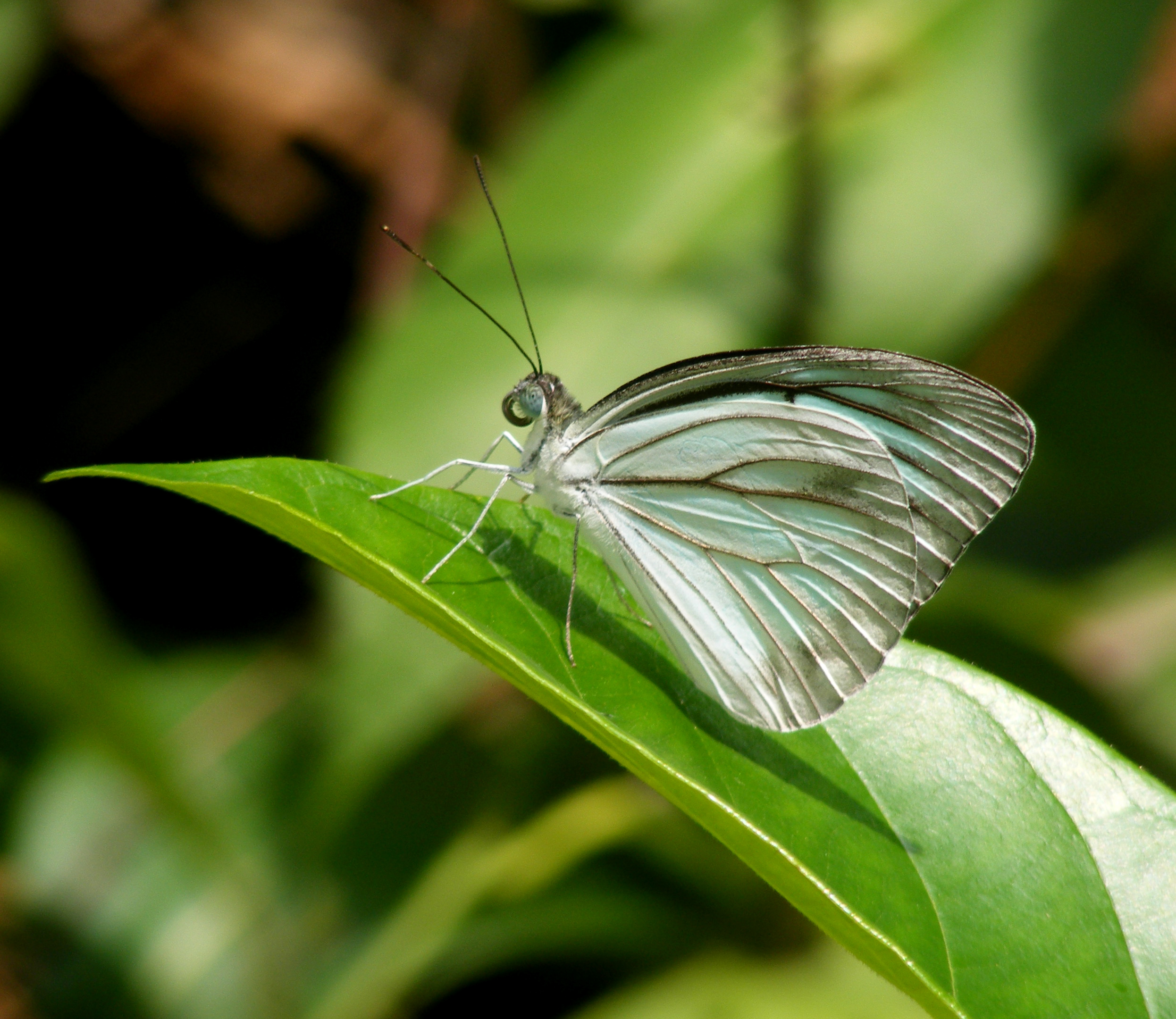
- Male
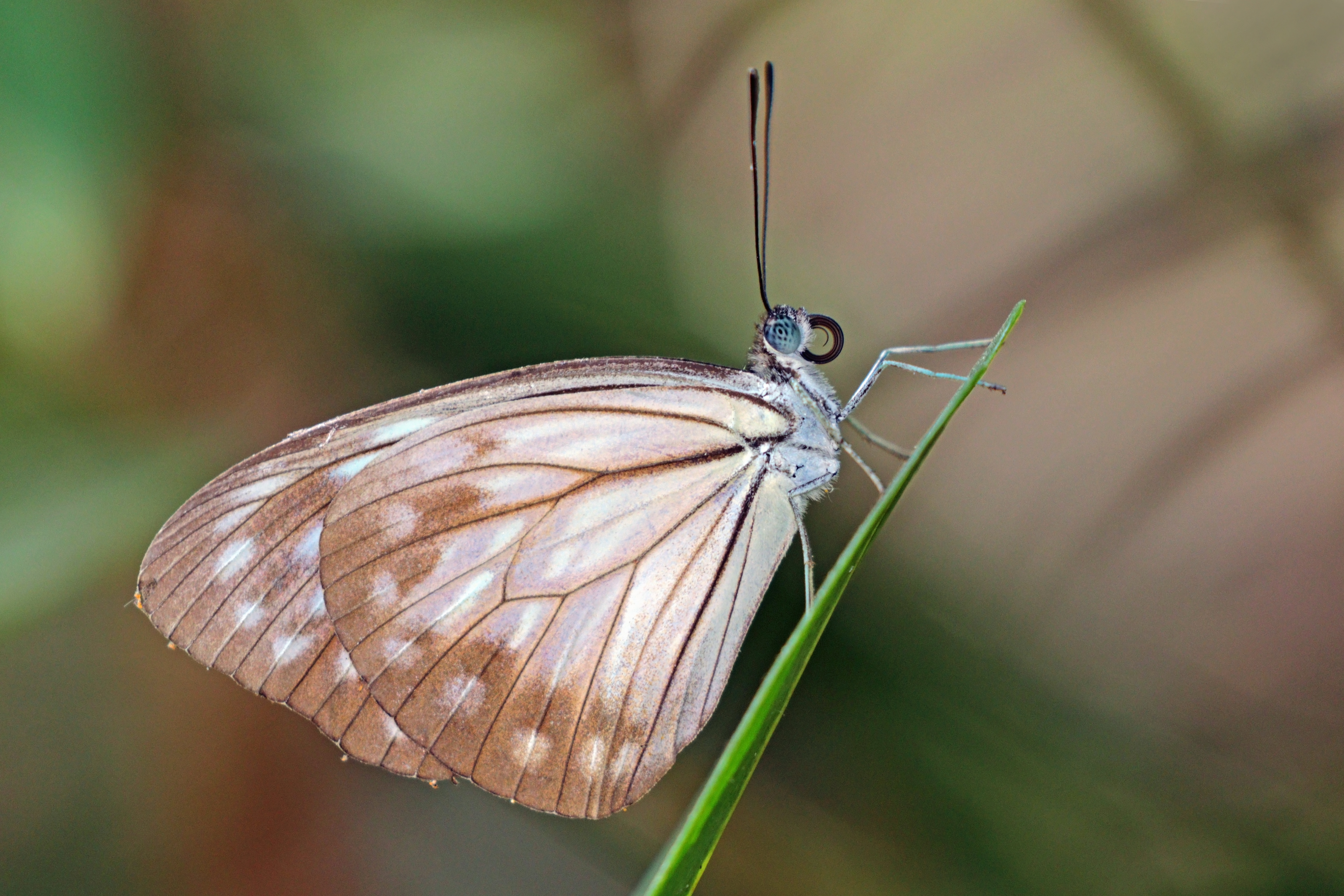
- Female, Nepal

Scientific classification
- Domain: Eukaryota
- Kingdom: Animalia
- Phylum: Arthropoda
- Class: Insecta
- Order: Lepidoptera
- Family: Pieridae
- Genus: Pareronia
- Species: P. hippia

Binomial name
- Pareronia hippia (Fabricius, 1787)

Synonyms
- Papilio hippia Fabricius, 1787; Danais anais Lesson, 1837; Eronia gaea C. & R. Felder, 1865; Nepheronia valeria persides Fruhstorfer, 1903; Pareronia valeria persides Fruhstorfer, 1910; Pareronia anais f. lutea Eliot, 1978; Nepheronia valeria hippia ab. livilla Fruhstorfer, 1903

= Pareronia hippia =

Indian wanderer

Species of butterfly

Pareronia hippia, the common wanderer or Indian wanderer, is a medium-sized butterfly of the family Pieridae, that is, the yellows and whites. It is found in India. Some authors consider this as a subspecies of Pareronia valeria.

== Description ==
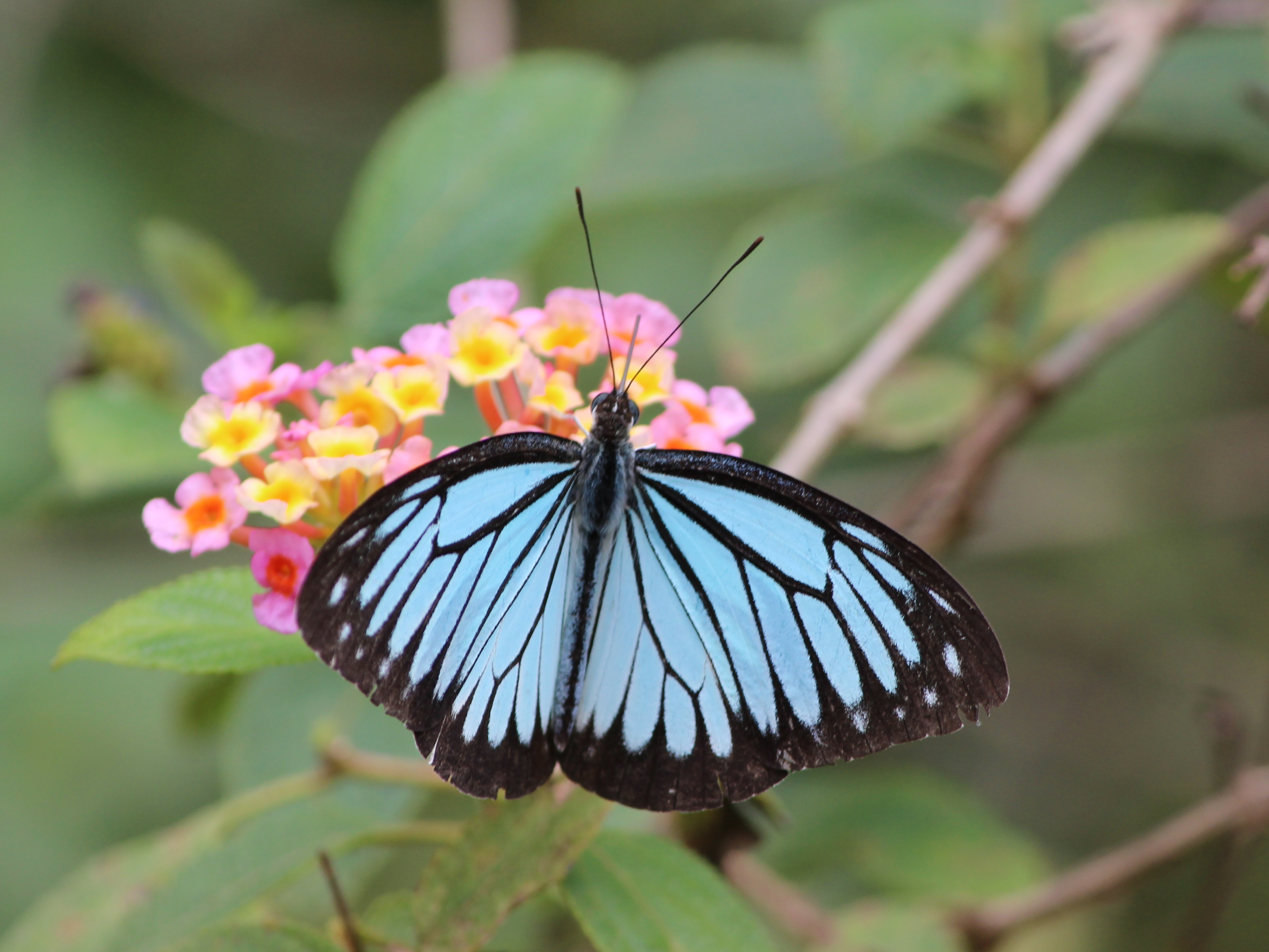
Male in Karnataka, India

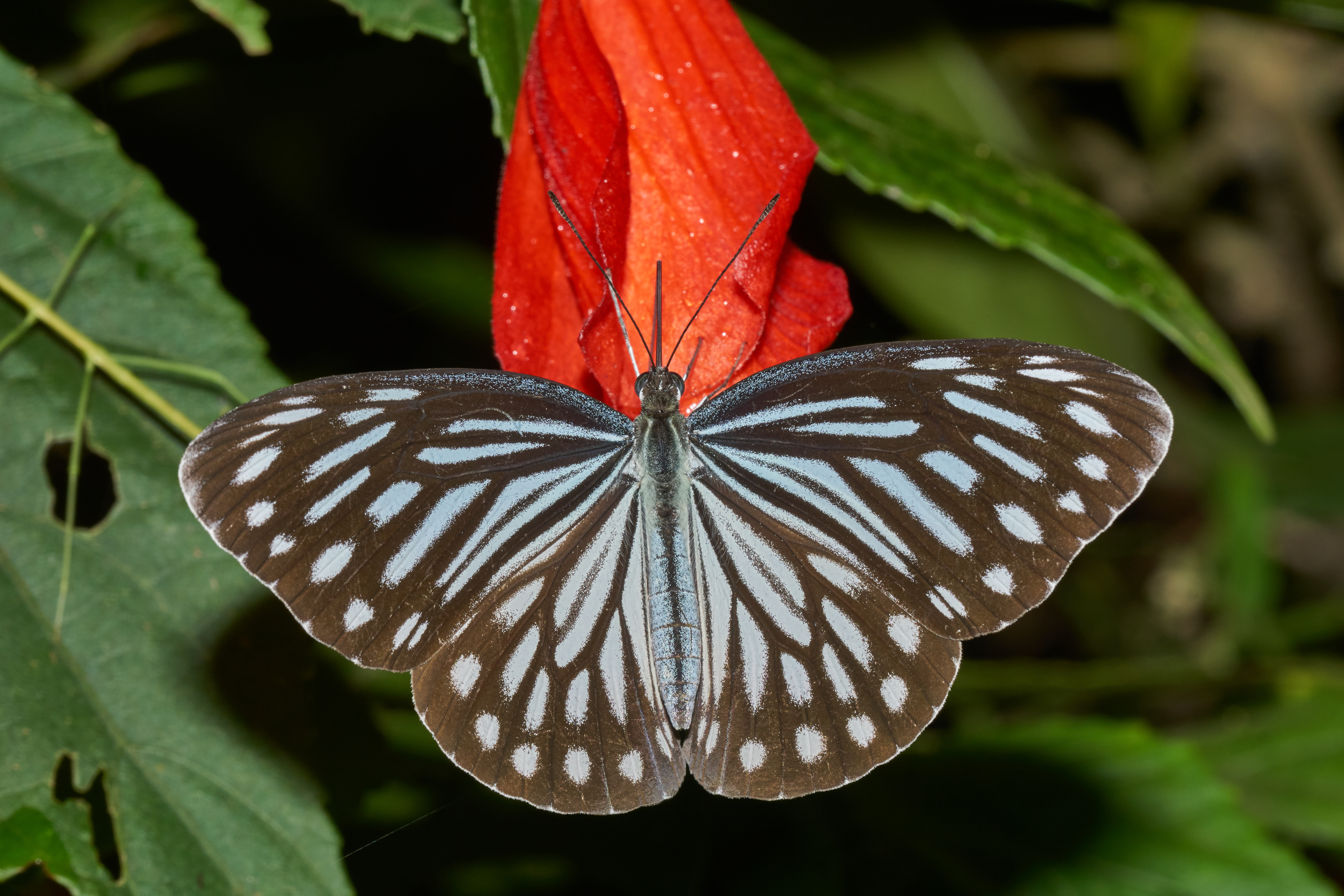
Female, common form, in Silent Valley National Park, Kerala

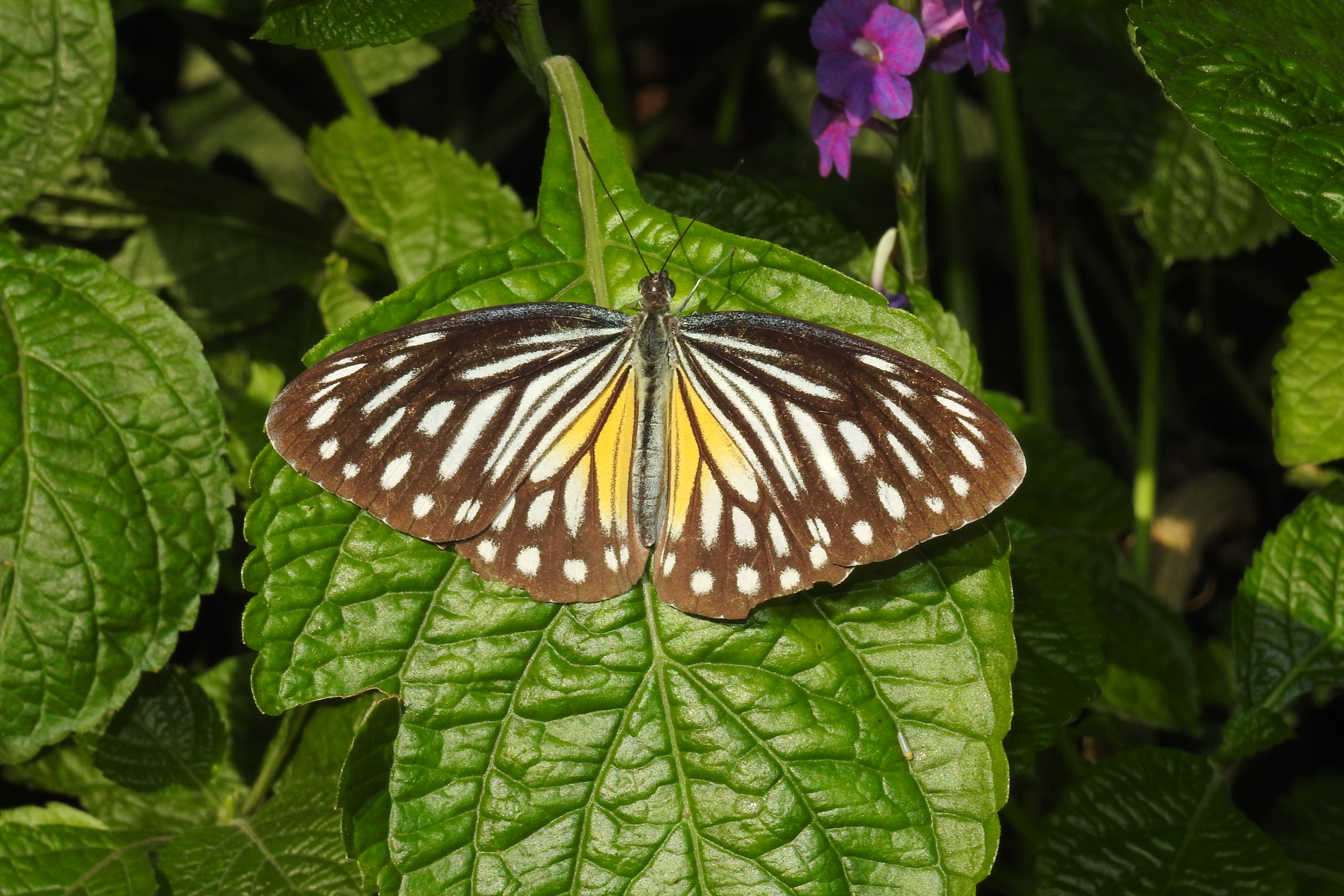
Female, philomela form

Male upperside: ground colour a clear pale blue of a much deeper tint than in P. avatar, Moore. All the veins defined with black. Forewing: costa broadly, apex and terminal margin very broadly black, this black on the termen narrowed towards the tornus, and traversed by a transverse subterminal series of bluish-white spots that are variable in number; the spot in interspace 3 shifted inwards; sometimes the posterior two spots of the series are all but joined onto the streaks of the ground colour between the veins. Hindwing: dorsal and costal margins broadly whitish: terminal margin broadly black, especially at apex, the black area covered, except at the tornus, with specialised opaque-looking scales. Underside: paler blue, the terminal margins of the wings obscurely fuscous, traversed by a subterminal, very indistinct, transverse series of whitish lunulated spots. Forewing: the veins more or less broadly bordered with black, this edging broadened towards the termen; apex broadly, terminal margin decreasingly to the tornus, suffused with a somewhat obscure pearly-while lustre. Hindwing: the subcostal vein and veins 6, 7, and 8 broadly, the rest of the veins very narrowly edged with black; a very fine black line in interspace 1. Cilia of both forewings and hindwings very narrow and white. Antennae black, head, thorax and abdomen fuscous, the thorax clothed with long bluish hairs; beneath: the palpi, thorax and abdomen pale silvery bluish white.

Female:

Female dimorphs

Common form. Upperside: black; the markings bluish white. Forewing: cell with two streaks, the anterior one from the extreme base, the posterior one from the end of the basal third, but extending beyond the anterior streak; below and beyond the cell is a series of streaks in the interspaces; the streaks very irregular in length, that in interspace 1 the longest, angulated anteriorly and divided longitudinally from near its base, the streak in interspace 3 short and broad forming an elongate spot, those in the anterior interspaces more or less obliquely placed; beyond these streaks follows a subterminal transverse series of spots, of which the spot in interspace 3 is shifted inwards and those opposite the apex curved backwards. Hindwing: costa and dorsum broadly white; cell and the interspaces beyond with a series of streaks and sub-terminal spots, more or less as in the forewing but more regular; the streak in cell and interspace 1 divided longitudinally, the subterminal series of spots evenly curved.

Underside is similar to the upperside, but the ground colour dull, dusky and diffuse, the markings are broader but less clearly defined; the apical area on the forewing obscured by a powdering of whitish scales. The antenna, head, thorax and abdomen are much as in the male but darker.

Philomela form is very like the first, the markings both on the upper and undersides similar, but the ground colour on the upperside of the hindwing at base of interspace 1a, over the whole of interspace 1, area of cell and at base of interspace 2 suffused with bright yellow. On the underside the same areas are dull ochraceous. The extent of the bright yellow colour on the upperside and of the dull ochraceous tint on the underside is variable in some specimens and more restricted in others. It spreads further towards the costa. The common form of female mimics glassy tiger to avoid predation. The philomela form is rare and identified by yellow colouration at the base of the wings. This form is reported more in north-east India. According to Mark Alexander Wynter-Blyth this form mimics Danais aspasia, which is not found west of Myanmar. He rejects the assumption that the wagtail carries the eggs of D. aspasia to India. It seems that in bygone era the D. aspasia might have been found in India in the past along with the common wanderer and later eliminated.

== Life history ==
This species breeds on Capparis zeylanica.

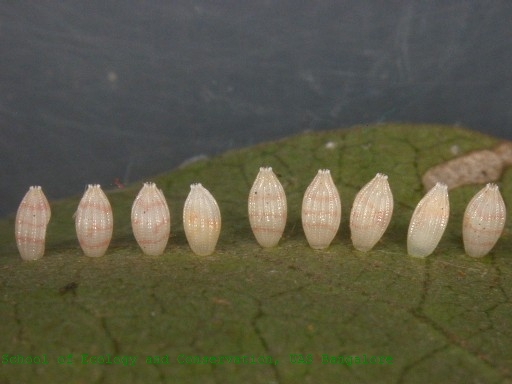
Egg

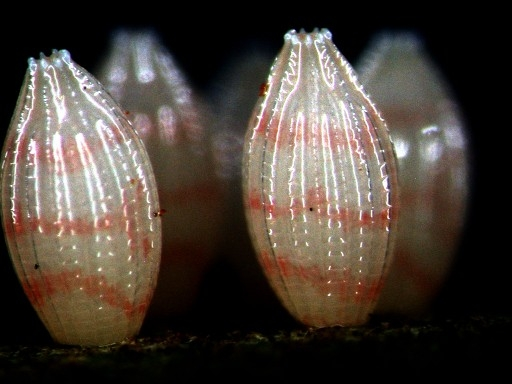
Egg

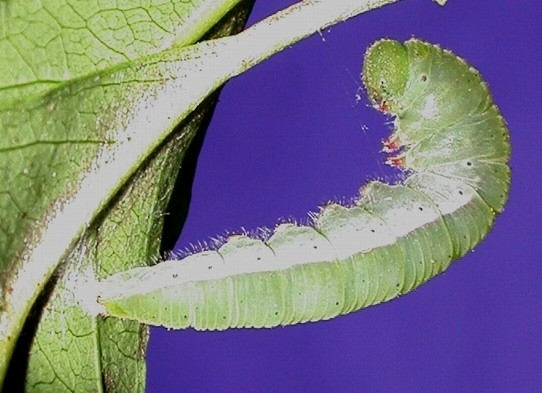
Pupating

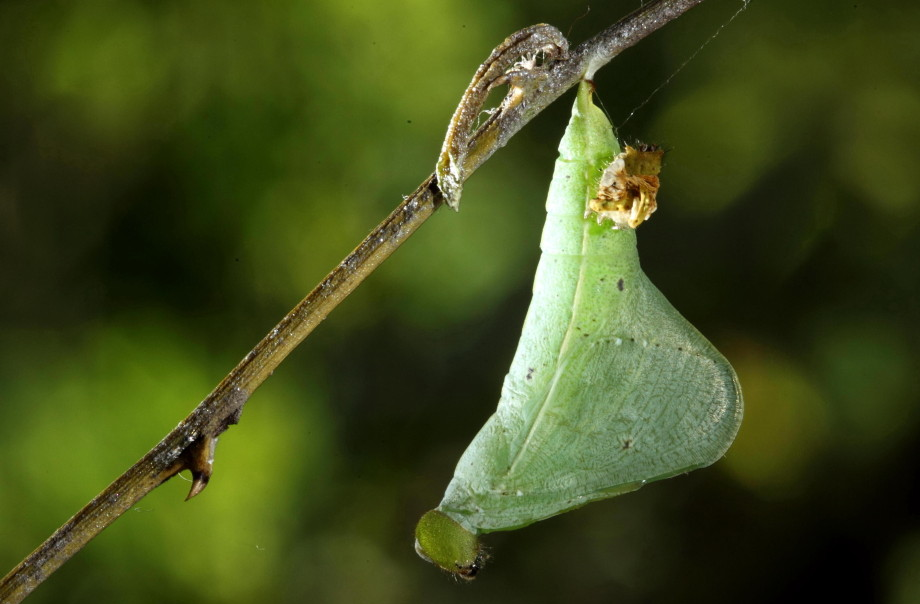
Pupa

== See also ==
- Pieridae
- List of butterflies of India
- List of butterflies of India (Pieridae)
