= Pareronia phocaea =

Scientific classification
- Kingdom: Animalia
- Phylum: Arthropoda
- Clade: Pancrustacea
- Class: Insecta
- Order: Lepidoptera
- Family: Pieridae
- Genus: Pareronia
- Species: P. phocaea

Binomial name
- Pareronia phocaea (C. & R. Felder, 1861)

Synonyms
- Eronia phocaea C. & R. Felder, 1861; Eronia phocaea ariamena Fruhstorfer, 1910

Species of butterfly

Pareronia phocaea is a species of pierine butterfly endemic to the Philippines.

== Subspecies ==
- P. p. phocaea (Philippines: Mindanao)
- P. p. ariamena (Fruhstorfer, 1910) (Philippines: Basilan)
in Seitz Fauna IndoAustralica Plate66e
