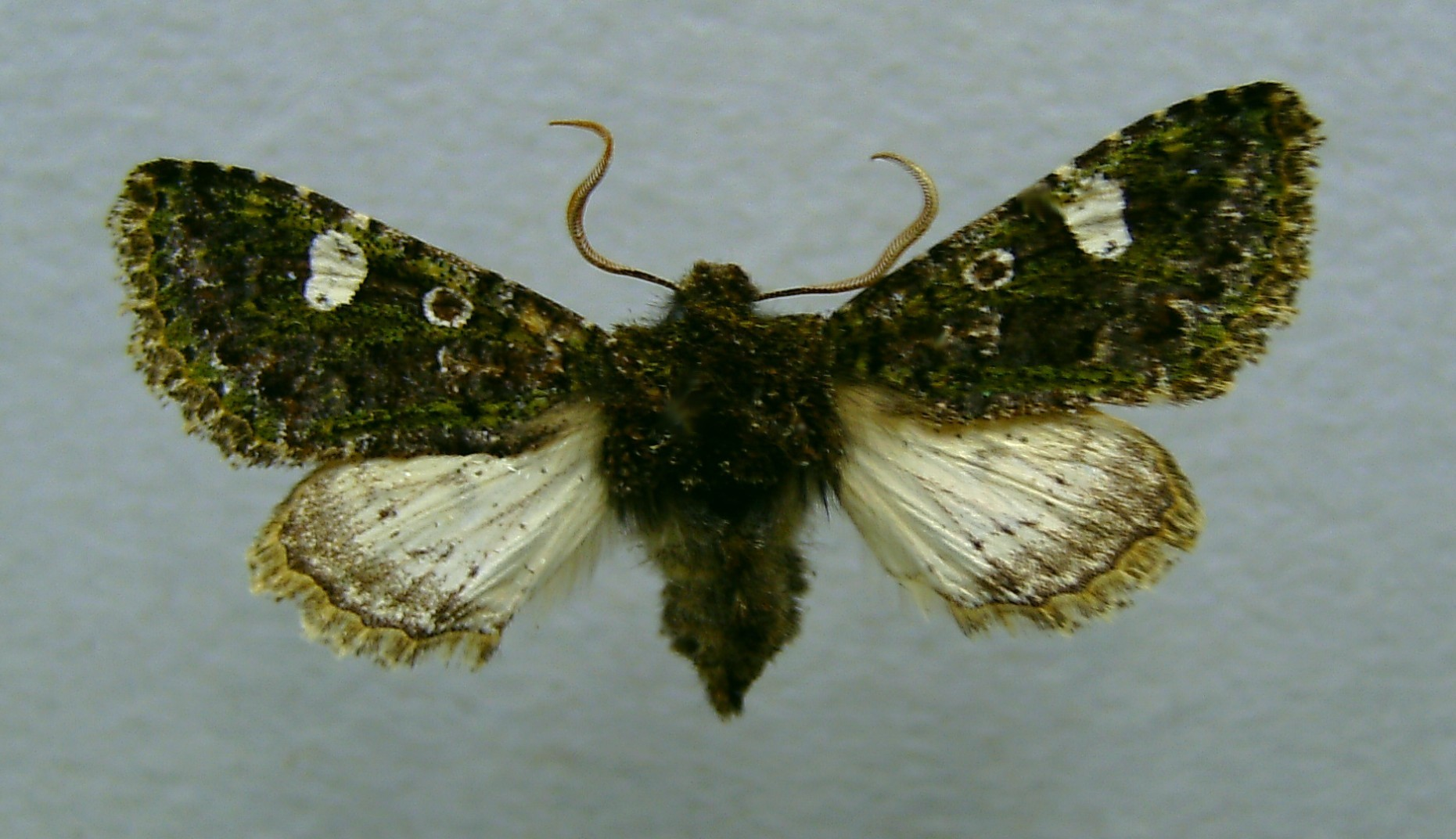

Scientific classification
- Kingdom: Animalia
- Phylum: Arthropoda
- Class: Insecta
- Order: Lepidoptera
- Superfamily: Noctuoidea
- Family: Noctuidae
- Genus: Valeria
- Species: V. oleagina

Binomial name
- Valeria oleagina (Denis & Schiffermüller, 1775)

Synonyms
- Synvaleria oleagina; Bombyx oleagina

= Valeria oleagina =

Species of moth

The green-brindled dot (Valeria oleagina) is a species of moth of the family Noctuidae. It is found in southern Europe and the Middle East, then east to Iran and Ukraine. In Germany it is found up to the Eifel and Ahr.

== Technical description and variation ==
V. oleagina F. (33 a, b). Forewing purple; the veins, especially at termen, broadly green; lines blackish, indistinct; claviform small, obscure; orbicular round, green with a white ring; reniform large, white, with a dark speck at each end; submarginal line whitish, lunulate, preceded by purple-brown contiguous lunules; fringe iron-grey cut by white pencils; hindwing white, with fuscous cellspot, outer line, submarginal band, and fringes; marginal line wavy, black. Larva brownish-grey, paler in front; the hind segments laterally with oblique pale streaks; a pair of blunt points on the 11th and 12th segments; spiracles black between two yellow lateral lines; head black with an orange-yellow corslet. The wingspan is 34–38 mm.

== Biology ==
Adults are on wing from March to April depending on the location.

The larvae feed on the leaves of Prunus spinosa north of the Alps. In the South they feed on Prunus and Crataegus species.
