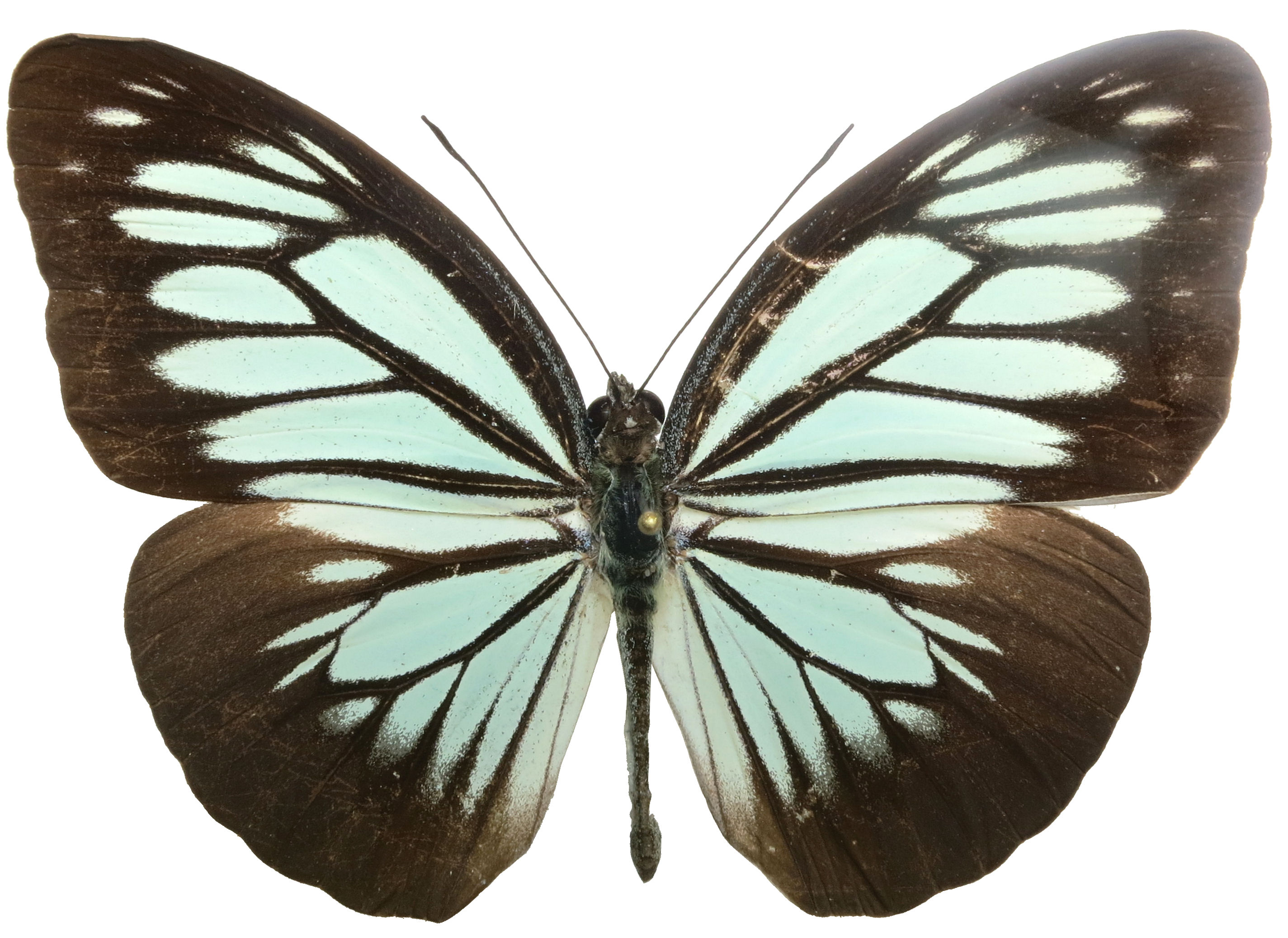
- Pareronia boebera boebera - Marinduque

Scientific classification
- Domain: Eukaryota
- Kingdom: Animalia
- Phylum: Arthropoda
- Class: Insecta
- Order: Lepidoptera
- Family: Pieridae
- Genus: Pareronia
- Species: P. boebera

Binomial name
- Pareronia boebera (Eschscholtz, 1821)

Synonyms
- Paphia boebera Eschscholtz, 1821; Nepheronia valeria bazilana Fruhstorfer, 1900; Valeria boebera arsamota Fruhstorfer, 1910; Valeria boebera elaitia Fruhstorfer, 1910

= Pareronia boebera =

Species of butterfly

Pareronia boebera is a species of pierine butterfly endemic to the Philippines.

== Subspecies ==
- P. b. boebera (Philippines: Luzon)
- P. b. bazilana (Fruhstorfer, 1900) (Philippines: Basilan)
- P. b. arsamota (Fruhstorfer, 1910) (Philippines: Negros)
- P. b. elaitia (Fruhstorfer, 1910) (Philippines: Panaon)
- P. b. joloana Fruhstorfer, 1911 (Jolo Island)
- P. b. trinobantes Fruhstorfer, 1911 (Philippines: Mindanao)
