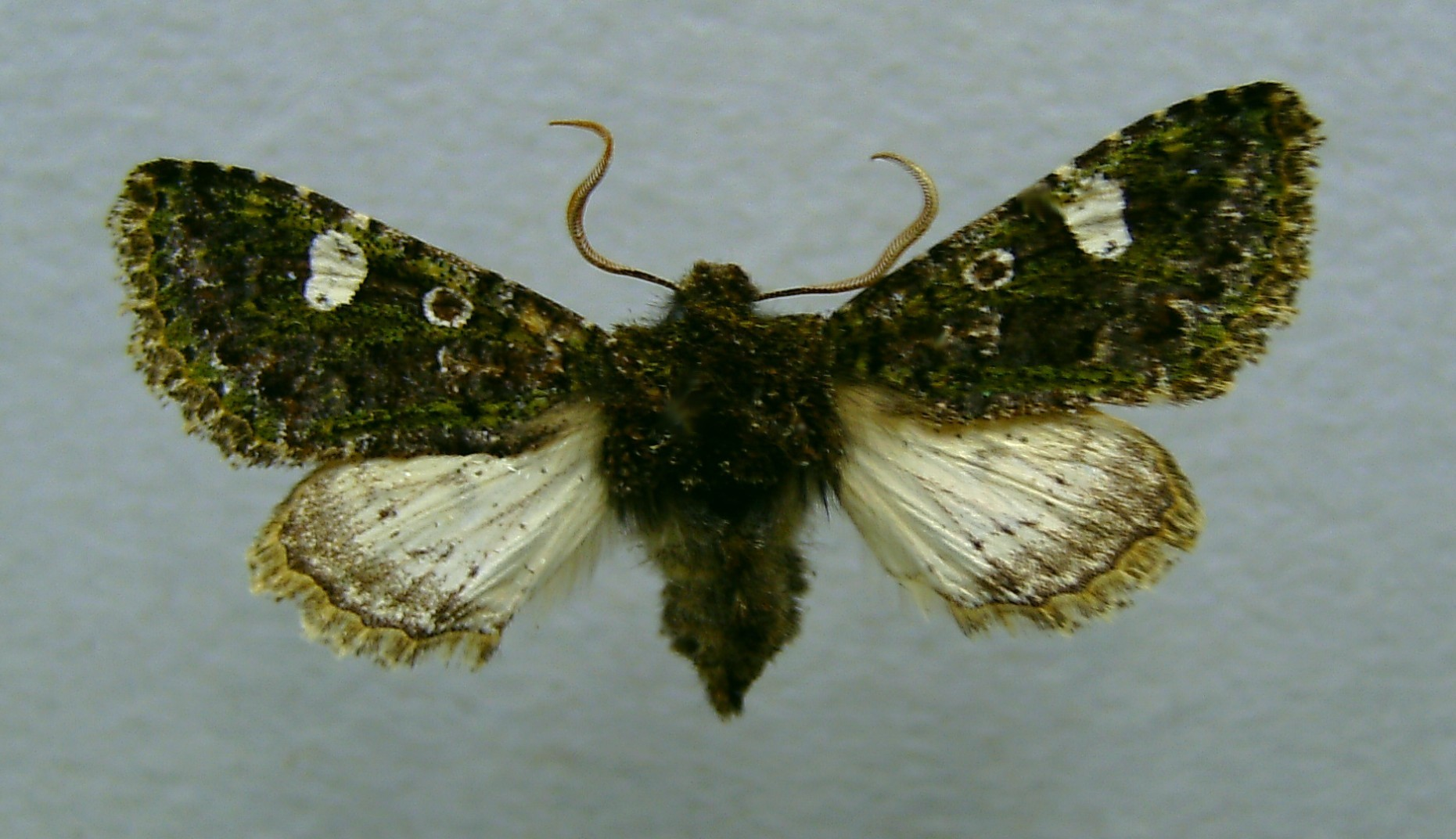
- Valeria oleagina

Scientific classification
- Domain: Eukaryota
- Kingdom: Animalia
- Phylum: Arthropoda
- Class: Insecta
- Order: Lepidoptera
- Superfamily: Noctuoidea
- Family: Noctuidae
- Tribe: Psaphidini
- Genus: Valeria; Stephens, 1829

= Valeria (moth) =

Genus of moths

Valeria is a genus of moths of the family Noctuidae.

== Species ==
- Valeria exanthema Boursin, 1955
- Valeria jaspidea Denis & Schiffermüller, 1775
- Valeria karthalea Kuhna & Schmitz, 1997
- Valeria mienshani Draudt, 1950
- Valeria oleagina (Denis & Schiffermüller, 1775)
- Valeria tricristata de Villers, 1789
