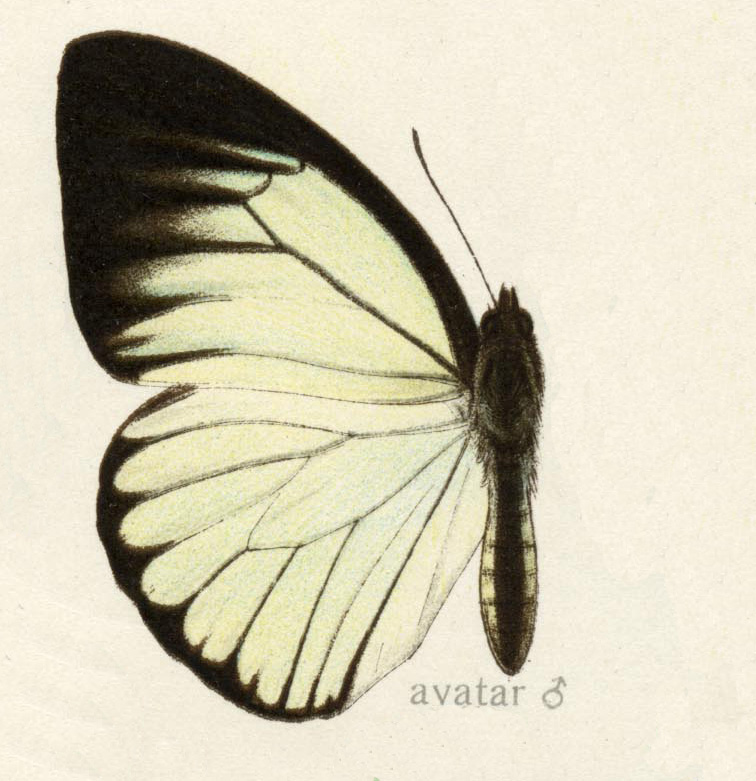
- From Adalbert Seitz's Macrolepidoptera of the World
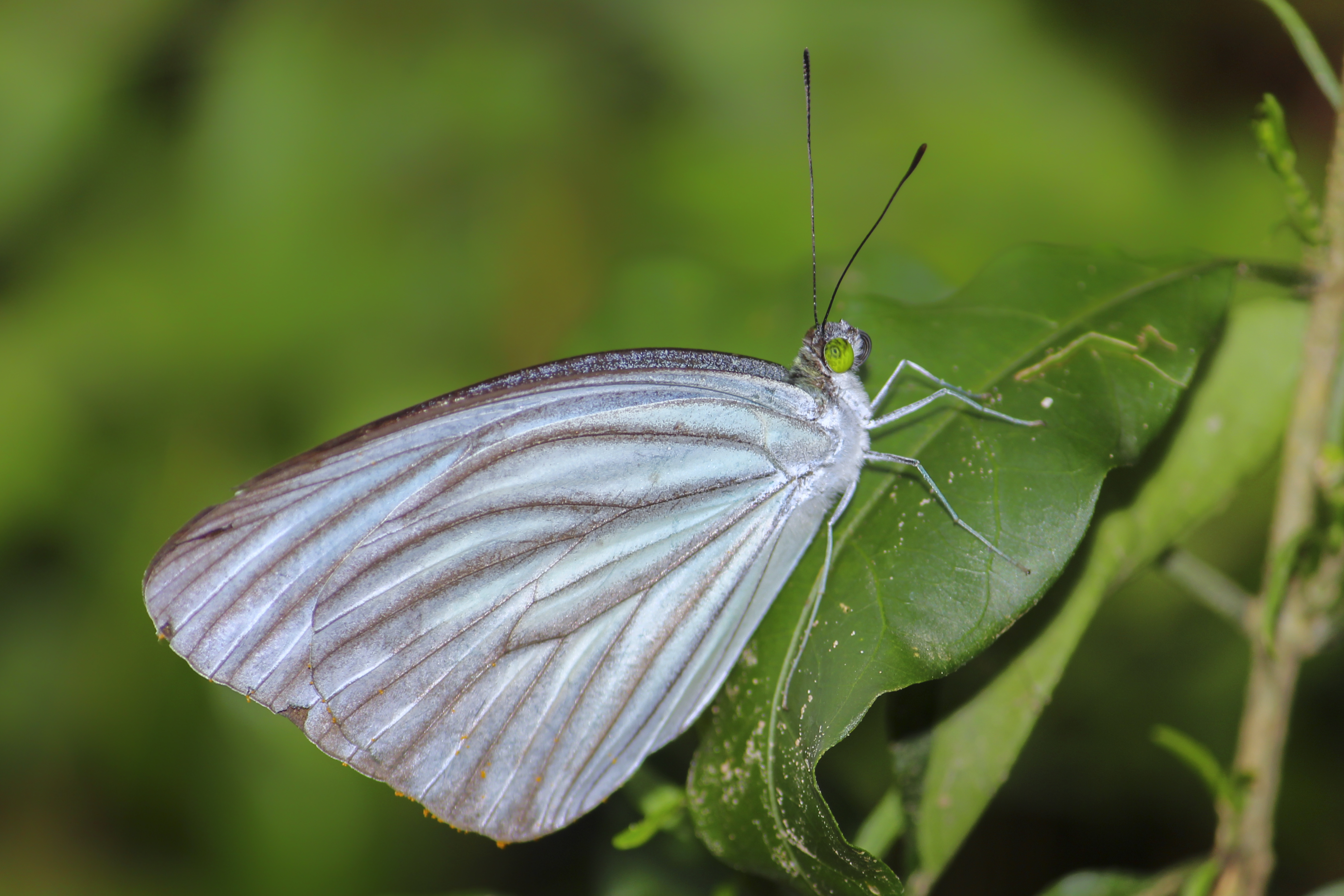

Scientific classification
- Kingdom: Animalia
- Phylum: Arthropoda
- Clade: Pancrustacea
- Class: Insecta
- Order: Lepidoptera
- Family: Pieridae
- Genus: Pareronia
- Species: P. avatar

Binomial name
- Pareronia avatar (Moore, [1858])

= Pareronia avatar =

Pale wanderer

Species of butterfly

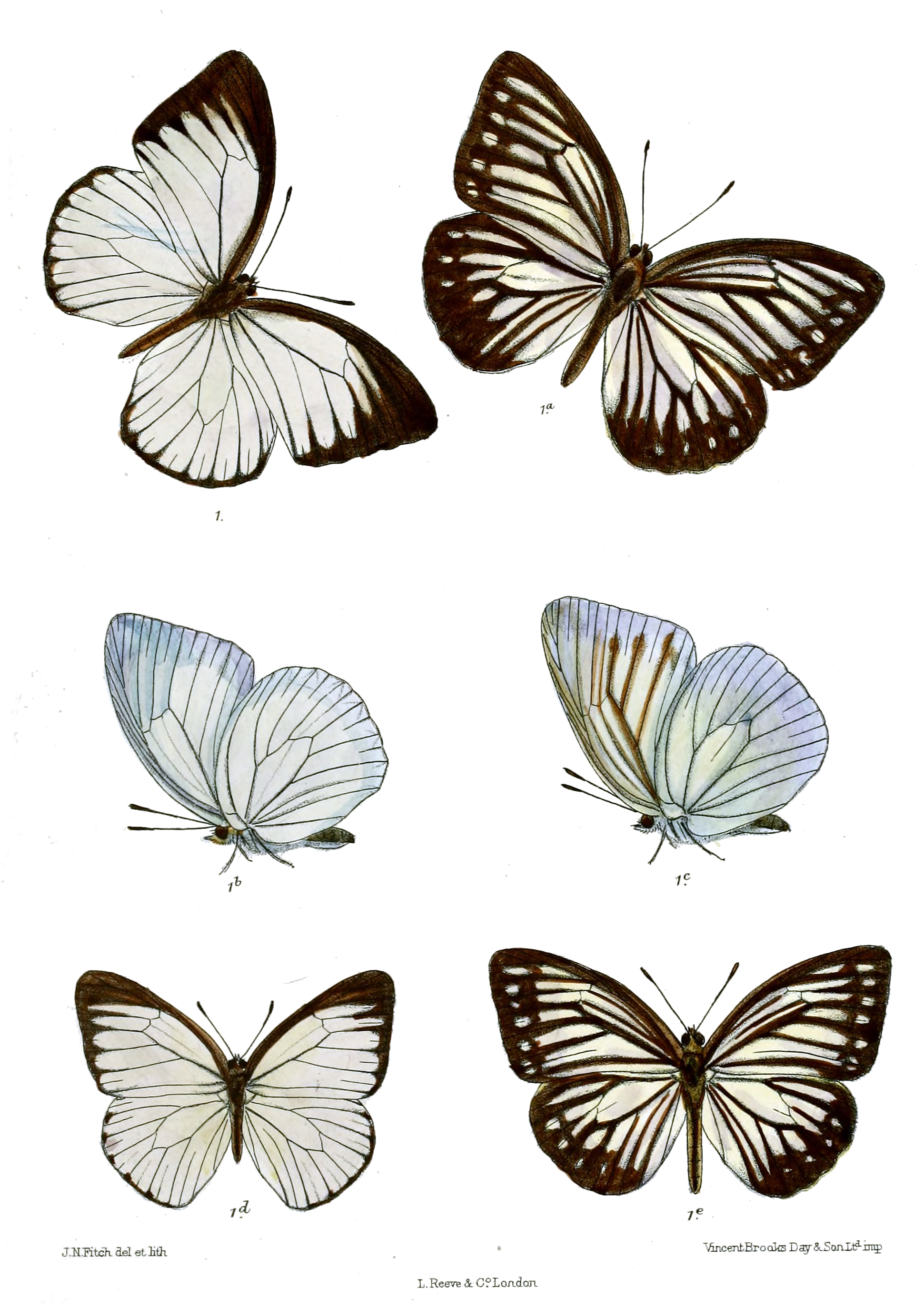

Pareronia avatar, the pale wanderer, is a medium-sized butterfly of the family Pieridae, that includes the yellows and whites. It is found in South and Southeast Asia.
