= Matsudai =

Matsudai may refer to:

== Places ==
- Matsudai, Niigata, a former town in Niigata, Japan, now merged into Tōkamachi
- Matsudai Station, a train station in Tōkamachi, Niigata, Japan

== Species ==
- Acupicta bubases matsudai, a butterfly in the family Lycaenid
- Euseboides matsudai, a beetle in the family Cerambycidae
- Phyllonorycter matsudai, a moth of the family Gracillariidae
- Sparganothis matsudai, a moth in the family Tortricidae

== Other uses ==
- Miyajima Matsudai Kisen, a Japanese ferry company

== See also ==
- Matsudaira clan
