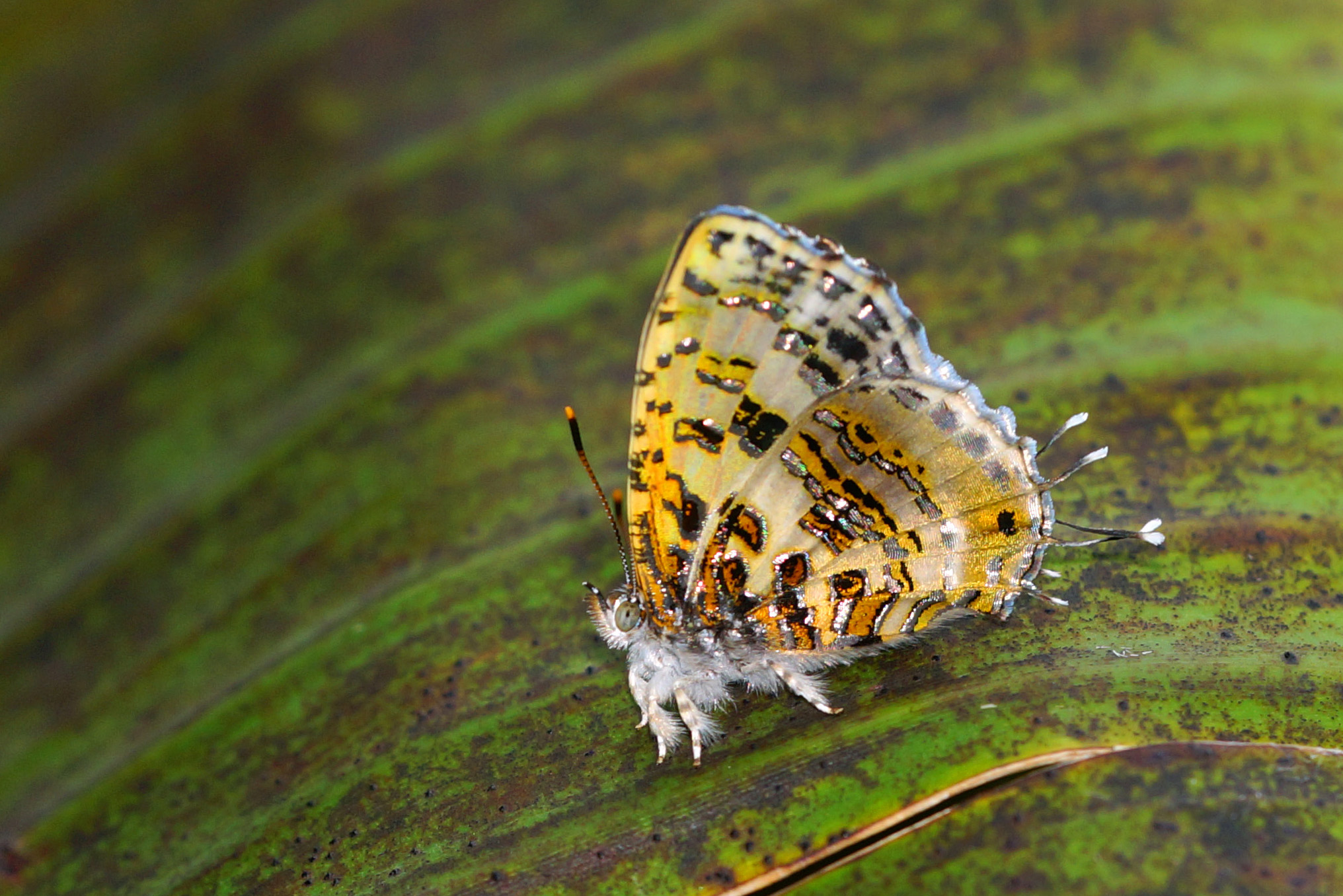
- Catapaecilma major moltrechti

Scientific classification
- Kingdom: Animalia
- Phylum: Arthropoda
- Clade: Pancrustacea
- Class: Insecta
- Order: Lepidoptera
- Family: Lycaenidae
- Subfamily: Theclinae
- Tribe: Catapaecilmatini; Eliot, 1973

Genera
- See text

Synonyms
- Catapaecilmini

= Catapaecilmatini =

Tribe of butterflies

The Catapaecilmatini are a small tribe of butterflies in the family Lycaenidae.

== Genera ==
The tribe contains a mere two genera at present, but as not all Theclinae have been assigned to tribes, the following list is preliminary:

- Acupicta
- Catapaecilma

== Etymology ==
Latinized names ending in "-ma" (often derived from Greek) are typically neuter and have a stem ending in -mat- (e.g., stigma from its genitive singular stigmatos becomes stigmat-, systema becomes systemat-), hence here with modified stem (Catapaecilmat-) + Tribal suffix (-ini).
