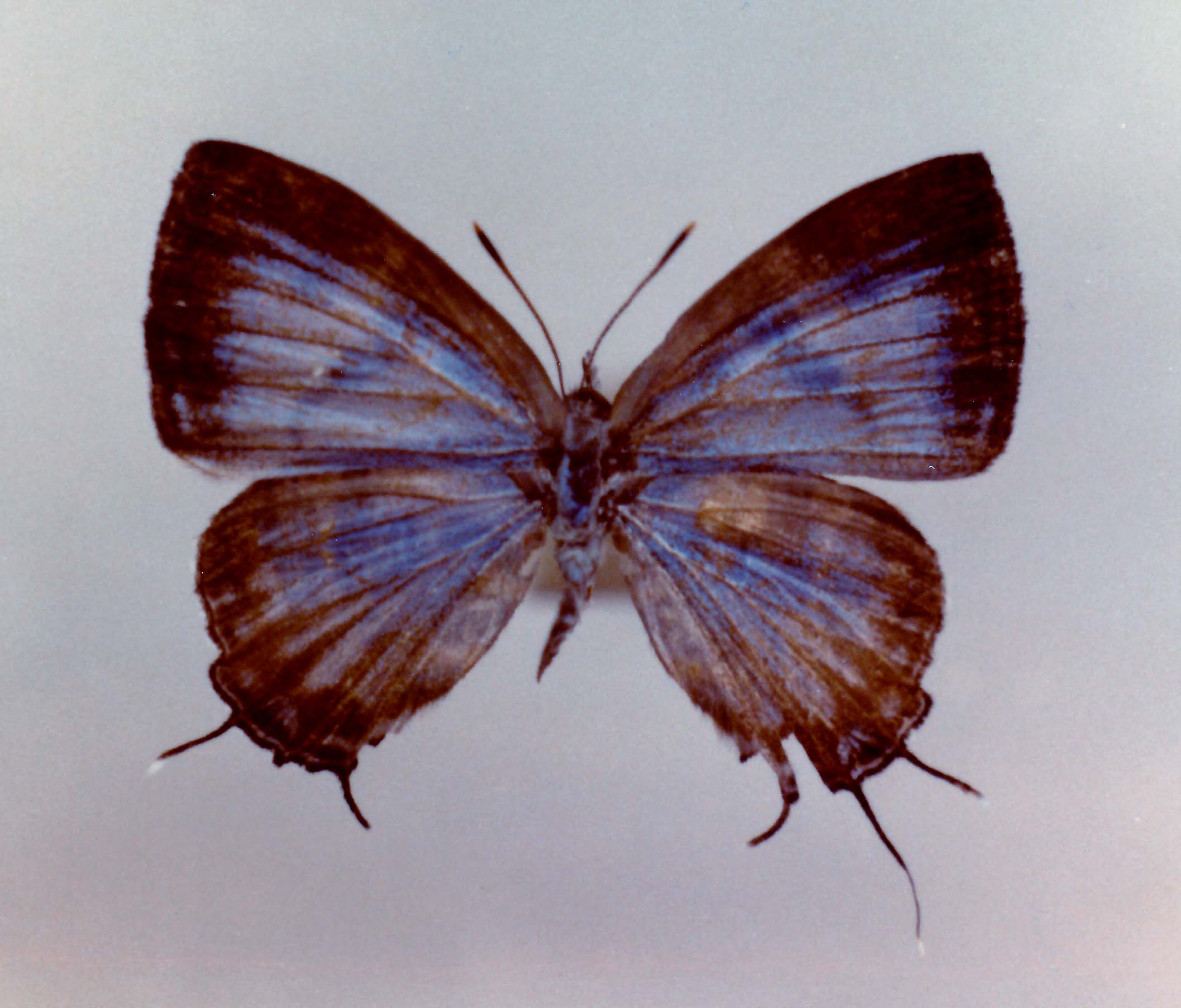
- Male upperside
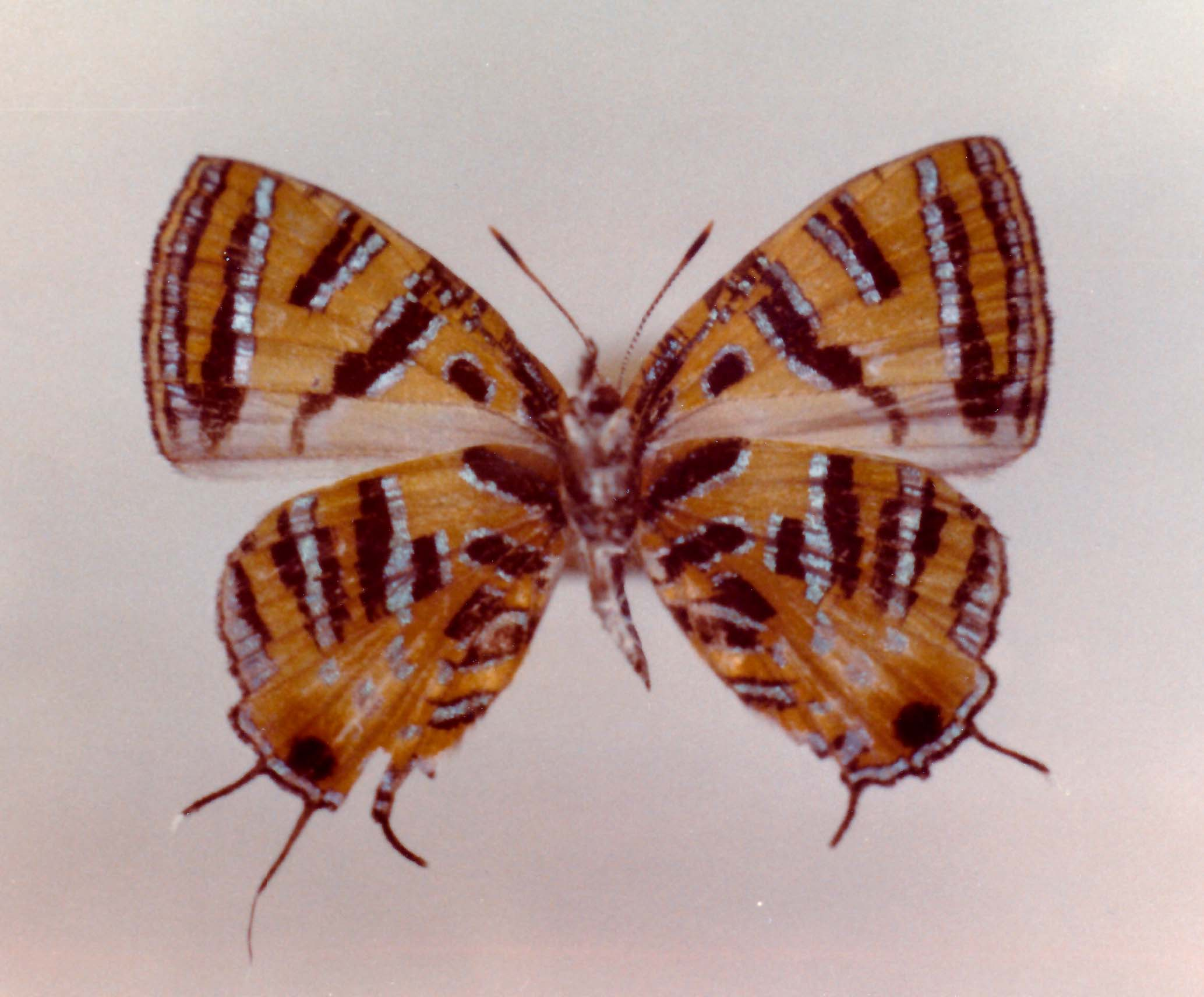
- Male underside

Scientific classification
- Kingdom: Animalia
- Phylum: Arthropoda
- Clade: Pancrustacea
- Class: Insecta
- Order: Lepidoptera
- Family: Lycaenidae
- Genus: Catapaecilma
- Species: C. evansi
- Subspecies: C. e. shizukoae

Trinomial name
- Catapaecilma evansi shizukoae H. Hayashi. 1984

= Catapaecilma evansi shizukoae =

Subspecies of butterfly

Catapaecilma evansi shizukoae is a subspecies of butterfly of the family Lycaenidae. It is found in Indonesia (Nias).
