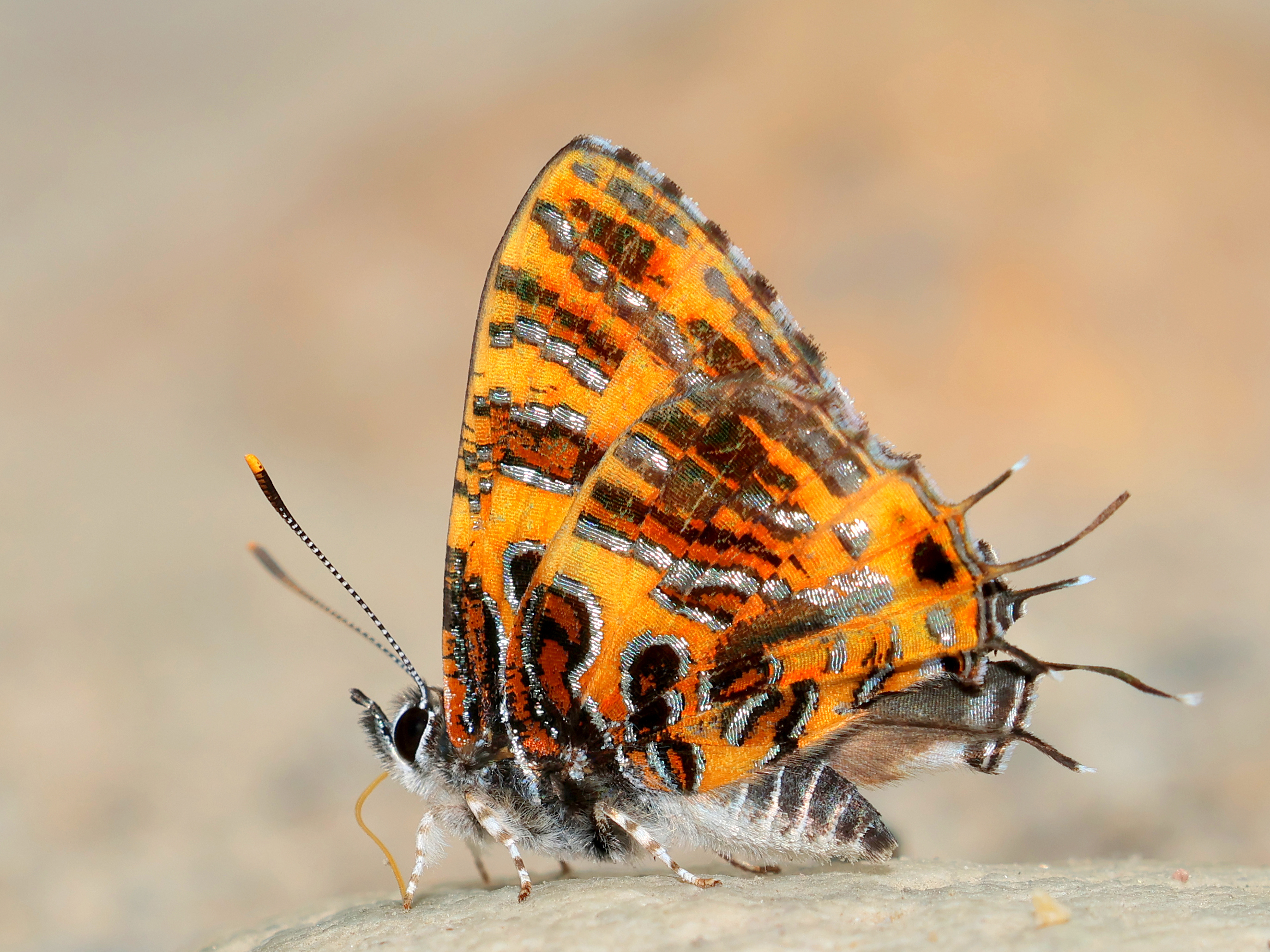

Scientific classification
- Kingdom: Animalia
- Phylum: Arthropoda
- Class: Insecta
- Order: Lepidoptera
- Family: Lycaenidae
- Genus: Catapaecilma
- Species: C. subochrea

Binomial name
- Catapaecilma subochrea (Elwes, [1893])

Synonyms
- Catapoecilma subochrea

= Catapaecilma subochrea =

Species of butterfly

Catapaecilma subochrea, the yellow tinsel, is a butterfly in the family Lycaenidae. It is found from North-east India to Thailand. It was described by Henry John Elwes in 1893.

== Description ==
This species is differentiated from the similar Catapaecilma major by the colour and arrangement of the markings of the underside. The upperside is brighter than C. major, and the forewing is not broader at the apex.
