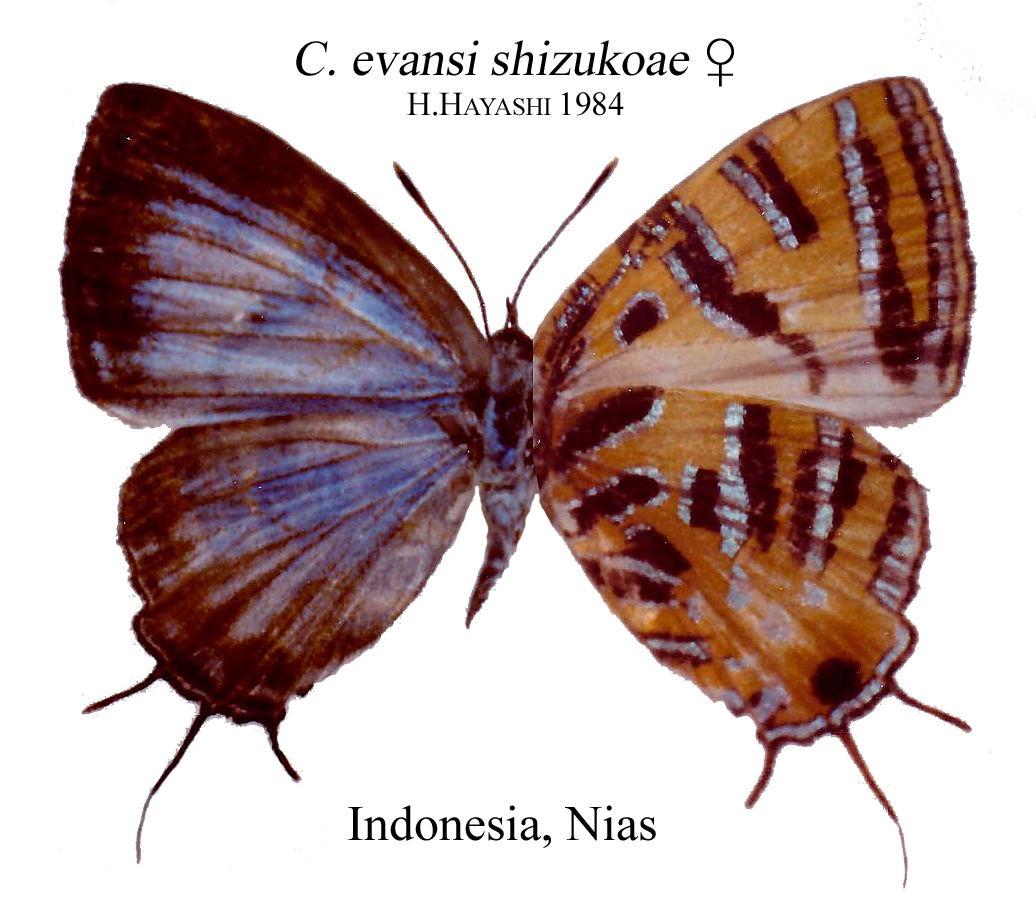

Scientific classification
- Domain: Eukaryota
- Kingdom: Animalia
- Phylum: Arthropoda
- Class: Insecta
- Order: Lepidoptera
- Family: Lycaenidae
- Genus: Catapaecilma
- Species: C. evansi

Binomial name
- Catapaecilma evansi Pendlebury, 1933

= Catapaecilma evansi =

Species of butterfly

Catapaecilma evansi is a species of butterfly belonging to the lycaenid family described by Henry Maurice Pendlebury in 1933. It is found in Southeast Asia (Peninsular Malaya, Nias).

== Subspecies ==
- Catapaecilma evansi evansi (Malay Peninsula)
- Catapaecilma evansi parva H. Schröder & Treadaway, 1988 (Philippines: northern Negros)
- Catapaecilma evansi rizali Takanami, 1984 (Philippines: Mindanao)
- Catapaecilma evansi shizukoae H. Hayashi, 1984 (Nias)
