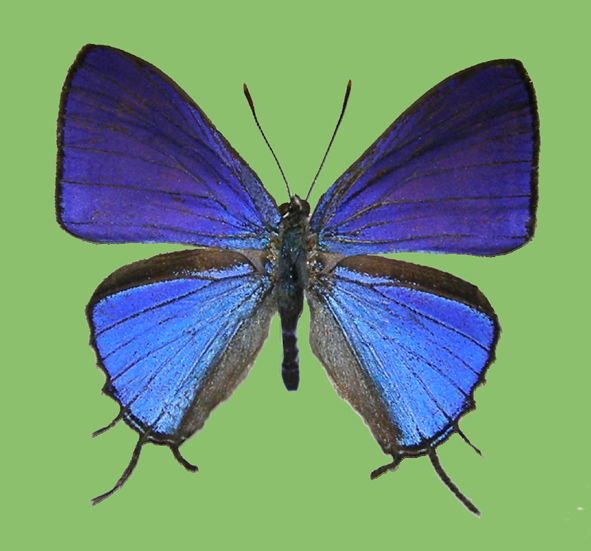
- Male upperside
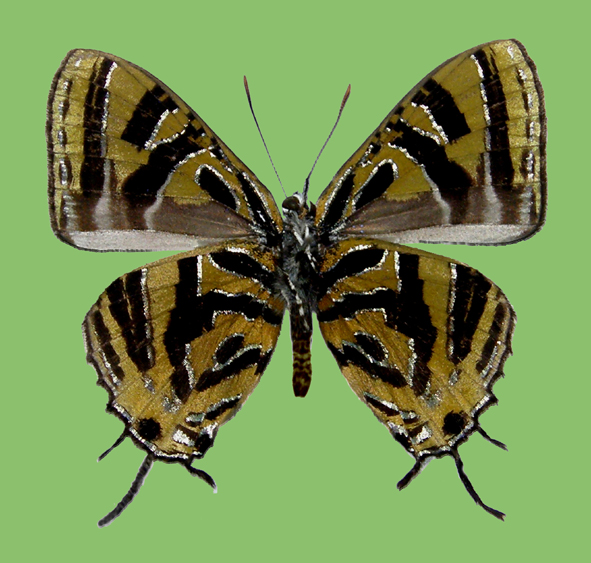
- Male underside

Scientific classification
- Kingdom: Animalia
- Phylum: Arthropoda
- Class: Insecta
- Order: Lepidoptera
- Family: Lycaenidae
- Genus: Catapaecilma
- Species: C. nakamotoi

Binomial name
- Catapaecilma nakamotoi H. Hayashi, 1979

= Catapaecilma nakamotoi =

Species of butterfly

Catapaecilma nakamotoi is a butterfly of the family Lycaenidae first described by Hisakazu Hayashi in 1979.

It is a rare species, endemic to the island of Mindanao in the southern Philippines.

Its forewing length is 17–19 mm.

The specific name is dedicated to Kazuya Nakamoto, Japanese butterfly collector.
