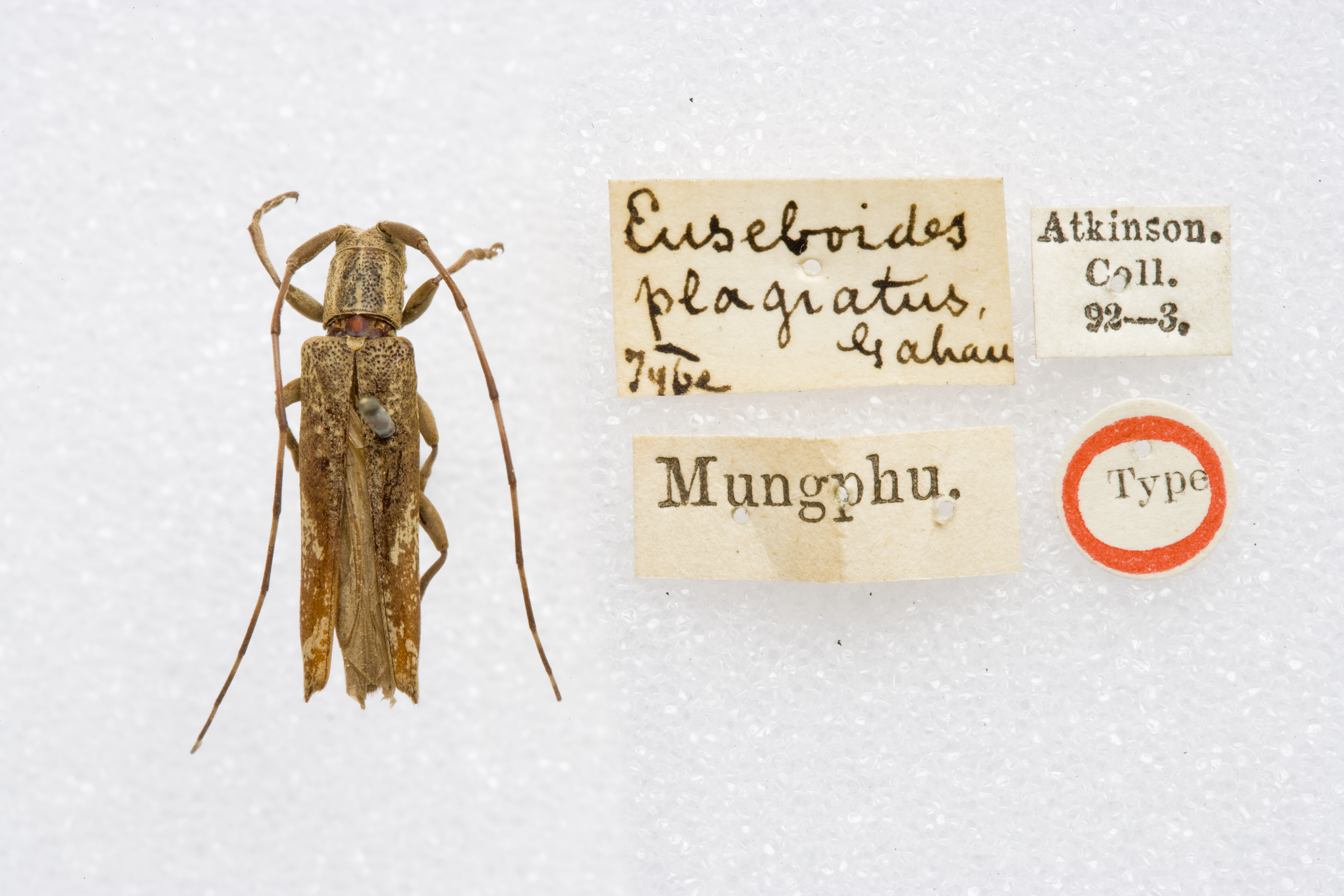
- Euseboides plagiatus

Scientific classification
- Kingdom: Animalia
- Phylum: Arthropoda
- Class: Insecta
- Order: Coleoptera
- Suborder: Polyphaga
- Infraorder: Cucujiformia
- Family: Cerambycidae
- Subfamily: Lamiinae
- Tribe: Desmiphorini
- Genus: Euseboides; Gahan, 1893

= Euseboides =

Genus of beetles

Euseboides is a genus of longhorn beetles of the subfamily Lamiinae, containing the following species:

- Euseboides matsudai Gressitt, 1938
- Euseboides plagiatoides Breuning, 1950
- Euseboides plagiatus Gahan, 1893
- Euseboides tonkinensis Breuning, 1973
- Euseboides truncatipennis Breuning, 1949
