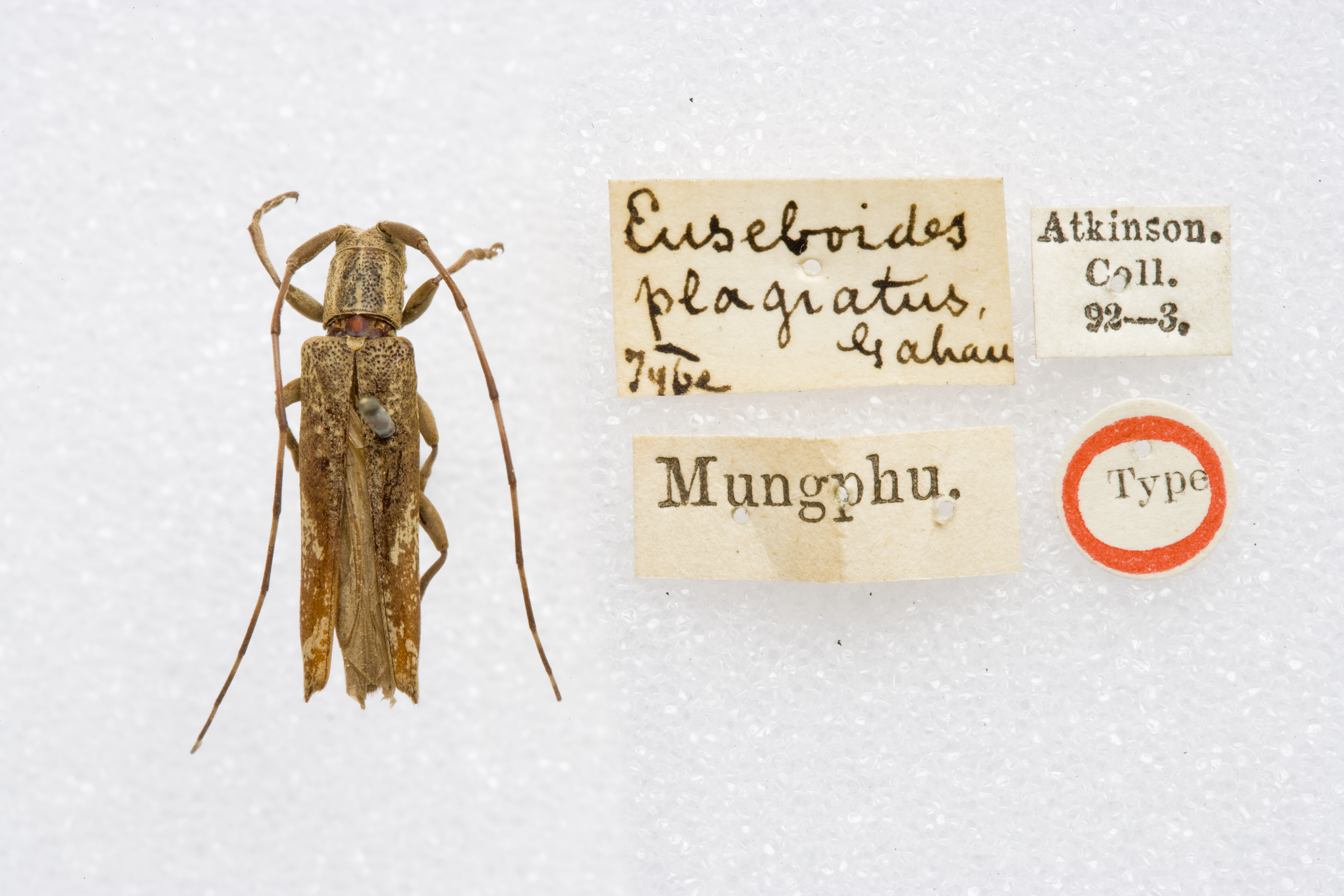
- Specimen of Euseboides plagiatus

Scientific classification
- Kingdom: Animalia
- Phylum: Arthropoda
- Class: Insecta
- Order: Coleoptera
- Suborder: Polyphaga
- Infraorder: Cucujiformia
- Family: Cerambycidae
- Genus: Euseboides
- Species: E. plagiatus

Binomial name
- Euseboides plagiatus Gahan, 1893

= Euseboides plagiatus =

Species of beetle

Euseboides plagiatus is a species of beetle in the family Cerambycidae. It was described by Gahan in 1893.
