= Euseboides truncatipennis =

Scientific classification
- Kingdom: Animalia
- Phylum: Arthropoda
- Class: Insecta
- Order: Coleoptera
- Suborder: Polyphaga
- Infraorder: Cucujiformia
- Family: Cerambycidae
- Genus: Euseboides
- Species: E. truncatipennis

Binomial name
- Euseboides truncatipennis Breuning, 1949

Species of beetle

Euseboides truncatipennis is a species of beetle in the family Cerambycidae. It was described by Stephan von Breuning in 1949.
