= Acupicta delicatum =

Scientific classification
- Kingdom: Animalia
- Phylum: Arthropoda
- Class: Insecta
- Order: Lepidoptera
- Family: Lycaenidae
- Genus: Acupicta
- Species: A. delicatum

Binomial name
- Acupicta delicatum (de Nicéville, 1887)

Synonyms
- Catapoecilma delicatum; Catapaecilma delicatum

Species of butterfly

Acupicta delicatum or the dark tinsel is a species of butterfly belonging to the lycaenid family. It was named by de Nicéville in 1887. It is found in North-east India and Bhutan.
