= Euseboides plagiatoides =

Scientific classification
- Kingdom: Animalia
- Phylum: Arthropoda
- Class: Insecta
- Order: Coleoptera
- Suborder: Polyphaga
- Infraorder: Cucujiformia
- Family: Cerambycidae
- Genus: Euseboides
- Species: E. plagiatoides

Binomial name
- Euseboides plagiatoides Breuning, 1950

Species of beetle

Euseboides plagiatoides is a species of beetle in the family Cerambycidae. It was first described by entomologist Stephan von Breuning in 1950.
