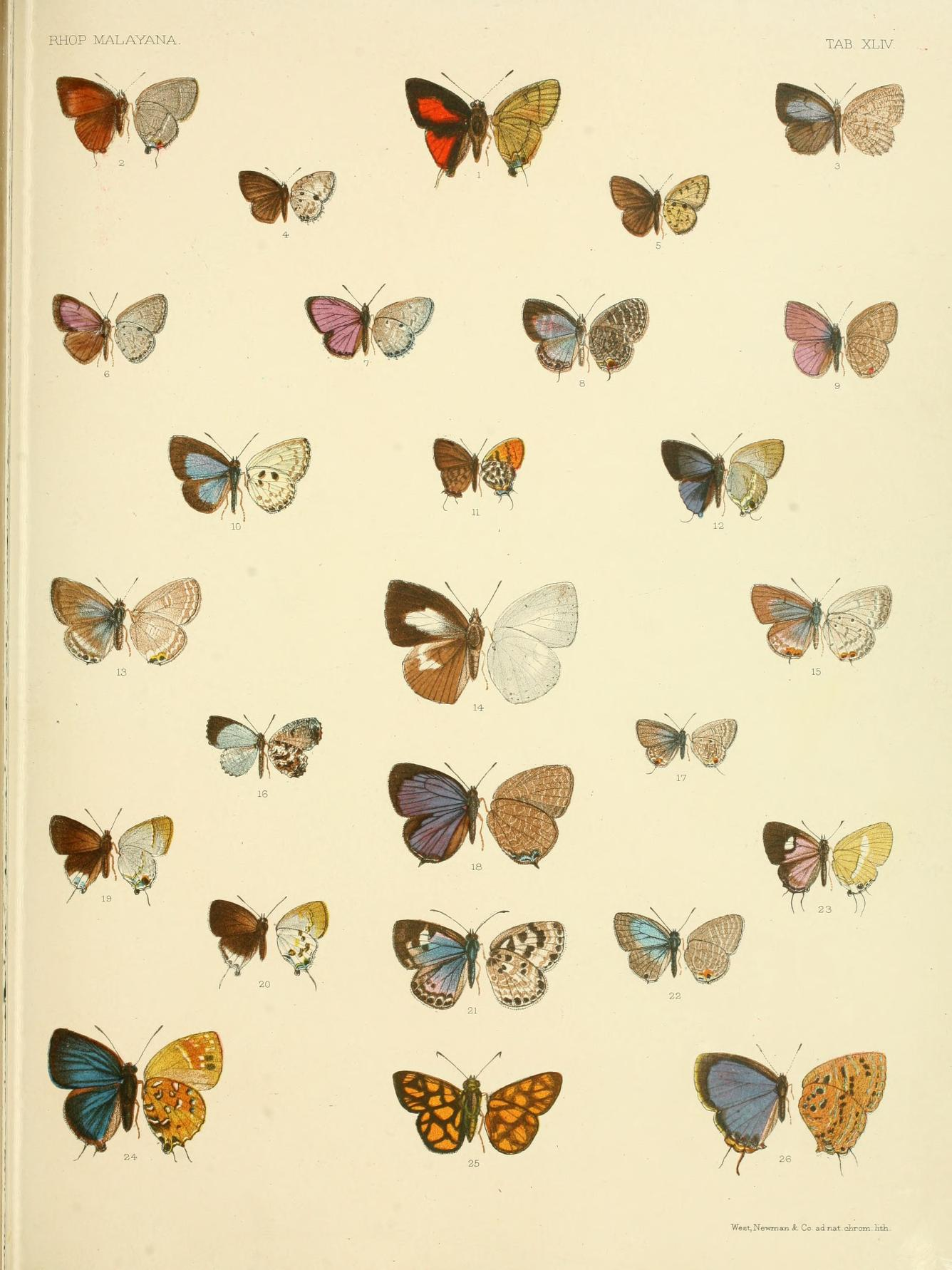
- Figure 26 in Rhopalocera Malayana

Scientific classification
- Kingdom: Animalia
- Phylum: Arthropoda
- Class: Insecta
- Order: Lepidoptera
- Family: Lycaenidae
- Genus: Acupicta
- Species: A. bubases

Binomial name
- Acupicta bubases (Hewitson, 1875)

Synonyms
- Hypochrysops bubases Hewitson, 1875

= Acupicta bubases =

Species of butterfly

Acupicta bubases is a species of butterfly belonging to the lycaenid family. It was named by Hewitson in 1875. It is found in Southeast Asia - Peninsular Malaya, Borneo (A. b. matsudai Okubo, 2007). It is a very large species with an expanse of almost 40 mm. Upper surface of male lavender-blue, with a black distal margin of 2 mm width; in the anal area of the hindwing there is a small yellowish marginal band in front of which there are 3 large blackish spots bordered with light. Under surface yellowish-red with some transverse chains of roundish dark brown spots between which the small lustrous stripes are interspersed. Malacca. Since a long time no more found again, presumably extremely rare and local.

== Subspecies ==
- Acupicta bubases bubases (Peninsular Malaysia)
- Acupicta bubases matsudai Okubo, 2007 (Borneo: Sabah)
