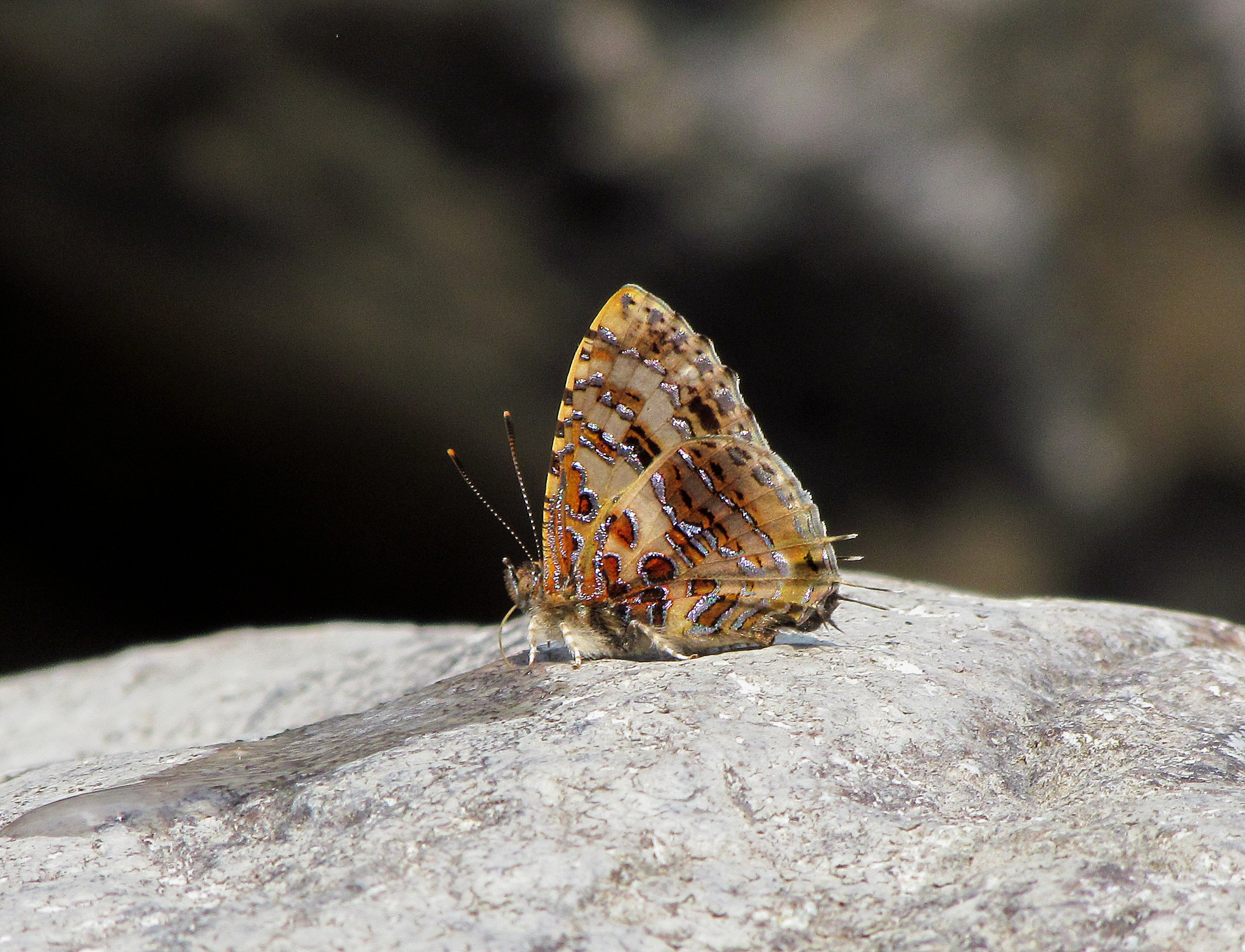

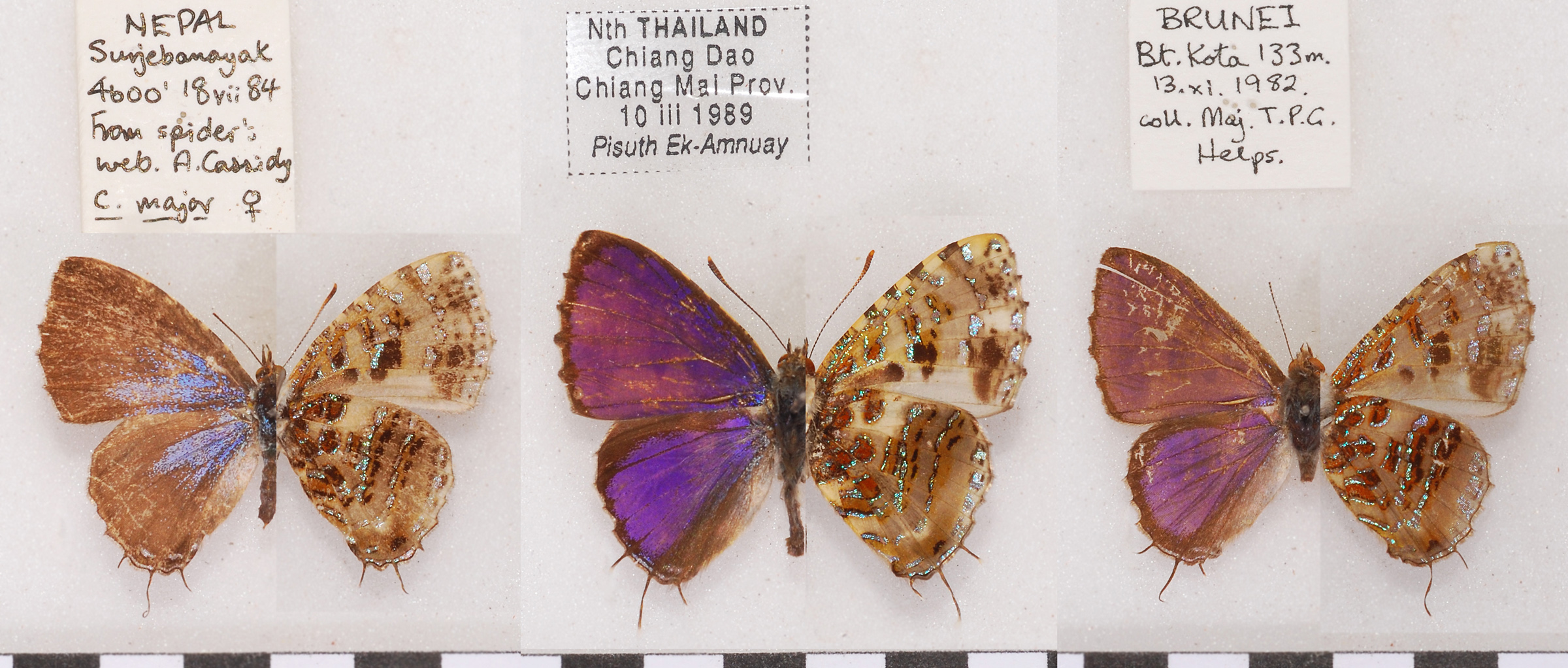

Scientific classification
- Domain: Eukaryota
- Kingdom: Animalia
- Phylum: Arthropoda
- Class: Insecta
- Order: Lepidoptera
- Family: Lycaenidae
- Genus: Catapaecilma
- Species: C. major

Binomial name
- Catapaecilma major (H. H. Druce, 1895)

Synonyms
- Catapoecilma major anais Fruhstorfer, 1915; Catapoecilma elegans emas Fruhstorfer, 1912; Catapoecilma major tyana Fruhstorfer, 1915; Catapoecilma elegans myosotina Fruhstorfer, 1912; Tajuria major moltrechti Wileman, 1908; Catapoecilma elegans sophonias Fruhstorfer, 1912; Catapoecilma major sophonias Fruhstorfer, 1915

= Catapaecilma major =

Common tinsel

Species of butterfly

Catapaecilma major, the common tinsel, is a species of butterfly belonging to the lycaenid family described by Hamilton Herbert Druce in 1895. It is found in the Indomalayan realm.

== Description ==
The two Bornean specimens (females) [of Catapaecilma elegans] before me differ from Sikkim examples by the central band on the fore wing below being straight, not Y-shaped, as appears to be invariably the case in Indian specimens, also in those from Ceylon, and again from Sumatra. On such slight material I do not propose to admit at present that the Indian representatives belong to a distinct species (they are certainly not typical), but in the event of their requiring a name I would suggest major.

— Hamilton Herbert Druce, A Monograph of the Bornean Lycaenidae

The larvae feed on Terminalia paniculata.

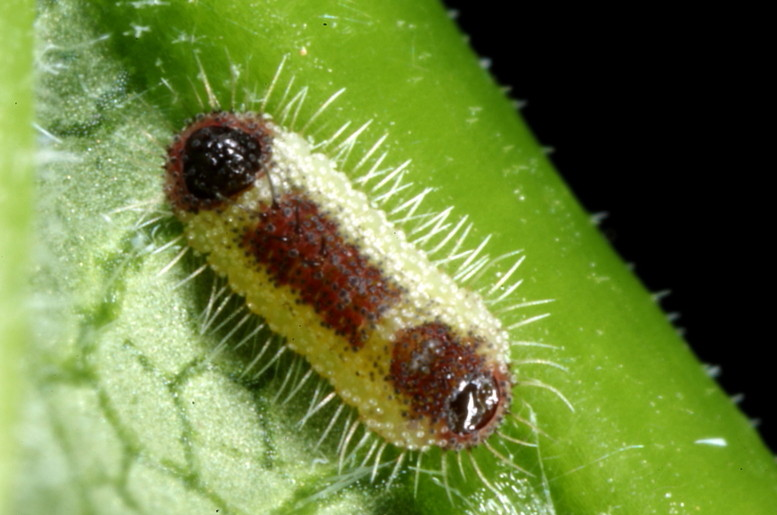
Larva

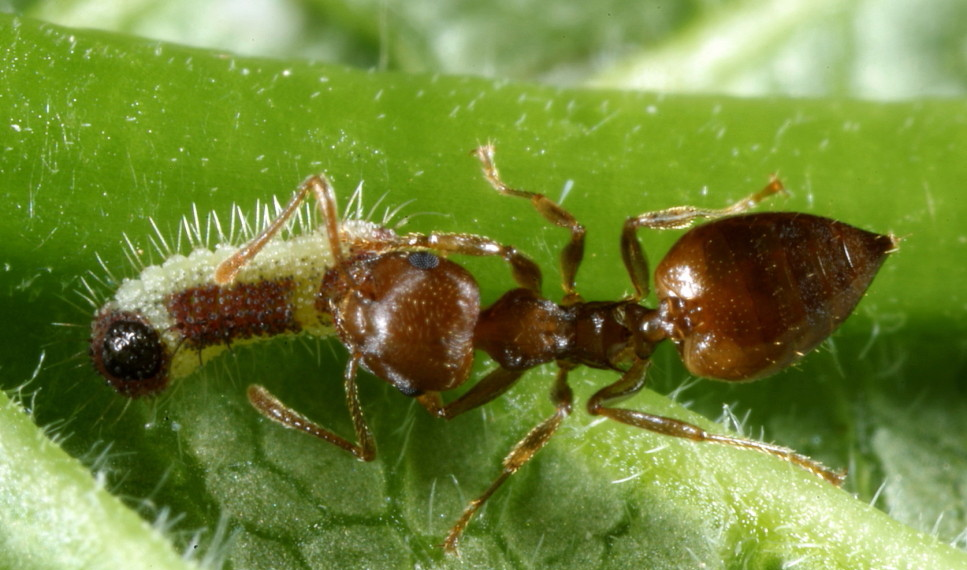
Larva attended by ant

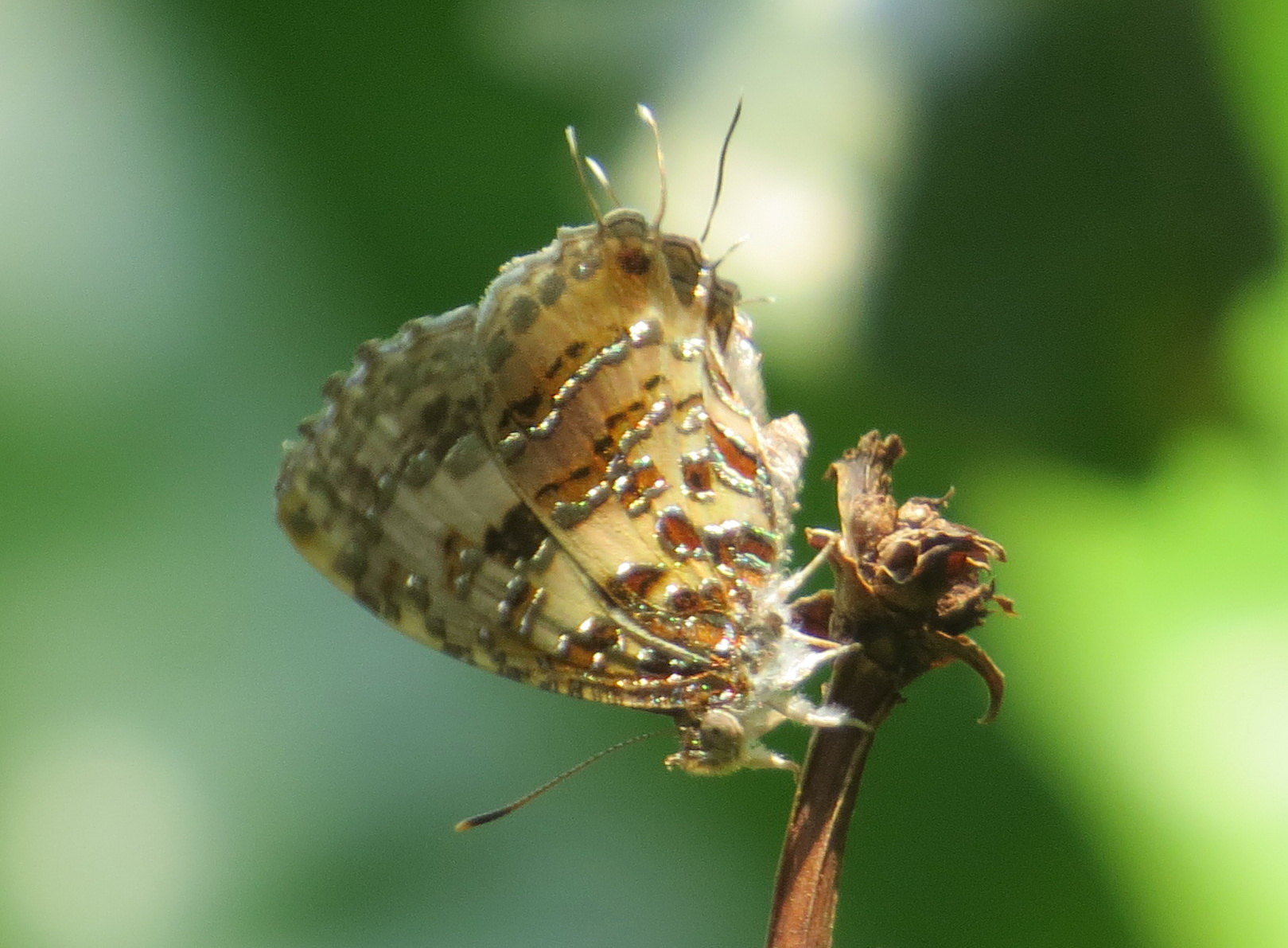
Imago

== Subspecies ==
The subspecies are:

- Catapaecilma major major (northern India to Myanmar, northern Thailand)
- Catapaecilma major anais Fruhstorfer, 1915 (northeast India)
- Catapaecilma major albicans Corbet, 1941 (Myanmar, Thailand, Laos)
- Catapaecilma major emas Fruhstorfer, 1912 (Peninsular Malaysia, Singapore, southern Thailand)
- Catapaecilma major callone (Fruhstorfer, 1915) (southern India)
- Catapaecilma major myosotina Fruhstorfer, 1912 (Sri Lanka)
- Catapaecilma major sedina (Fruhstorfer, 1915) (north-eastern Sumatra)
- Catapaecilma major moltrechti (Wileman, 1908) (Taiwan)
- Catapaecilma major sophonias Fruhstorfer, 1912 (western Java)
