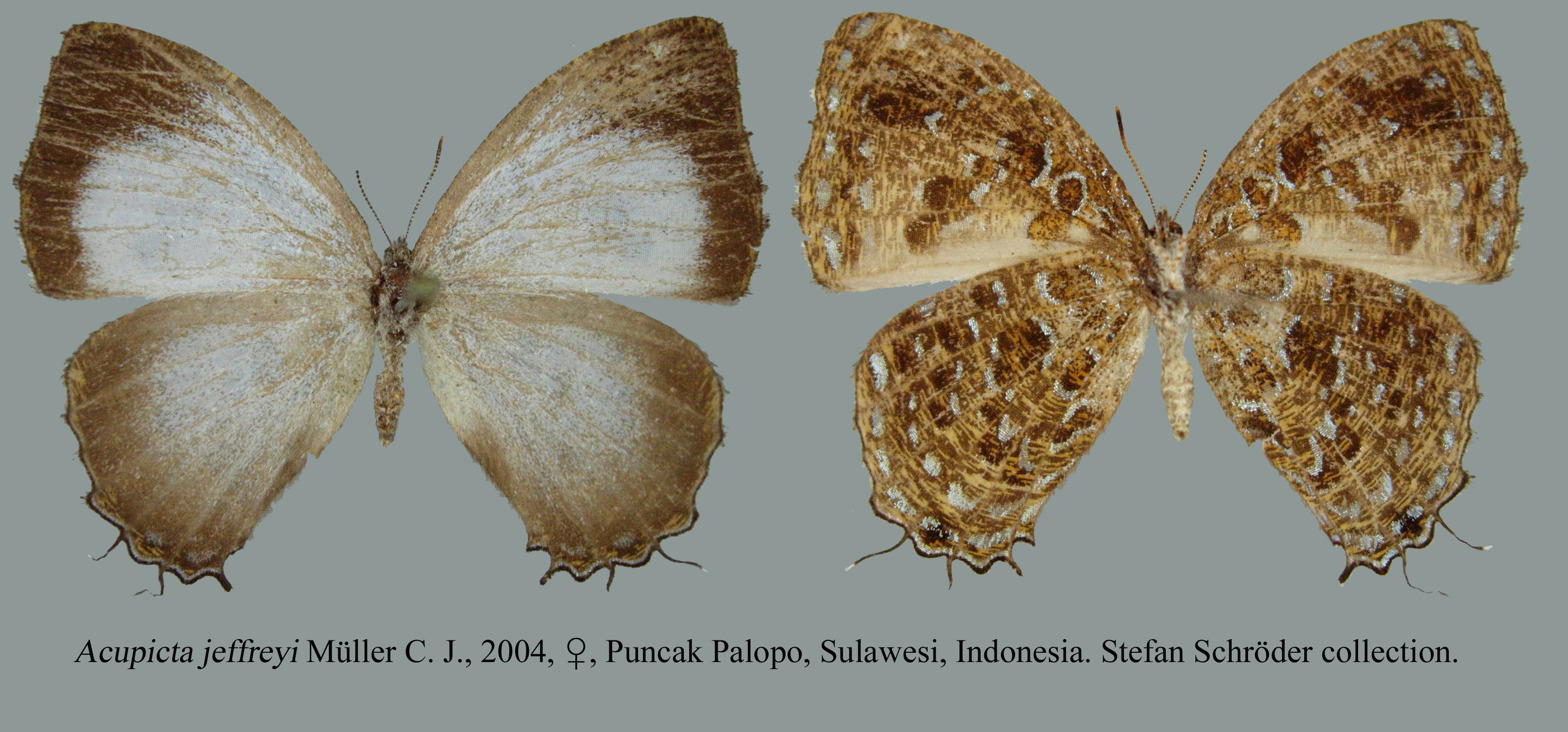
- Acupicta jeffreyi

Scientific classification
- Kingdom: Animalia
- Phylum: Arthropoda
- Class: Insecta
- Order: Lepidoptera
- Family: Lycaenidae
- Subfamily: Theclinae
- Genus: Acupicta; Eliot, 1973

= Acupicta =

Butterfly genus in family Lycaenidae

Acupicta is a genus of butterflies in the family Lycaenidae. The species are found in the Indomalayan and Australasian realms.

== Species ==
- Acupicta bubases (Hewitson, 1875)
- Acupicta delicatum (de Nicéville, 1887)
- Acupicta flemingi Eliot, 1975
- Acupicta inopinatum Schröder & Treadaway, 1998
- Acupicta jeffreyi Müller, 2004
- Acupicta meeki Eliot, 1974
- Acupicta trajana Okubo, 2007
