= Euseboides matsudai =

Scientific classification
- Kingdom: Animalia
- Phylum: Arthropoda
- Class: Insecta
- Order: Coleoptera
- Suborder: Polyphaga
- Infraorder: Cucujiformia
- Family: Cerambycidae
- Genus: Euseboides
- Species: E. matsudai

Binomial name
- Euseboides matsudai Gressitt, 1938

Species of beetle

Euseboides matsudai is a species of beetle in the family Cerambycidae. It was described by Gressitt in 1938.

== Subspecies ==
- Euseboides matsudai matsudai Gressitt, 1938
- Euseboides matsudai spinipennis Gressitt, 1940
