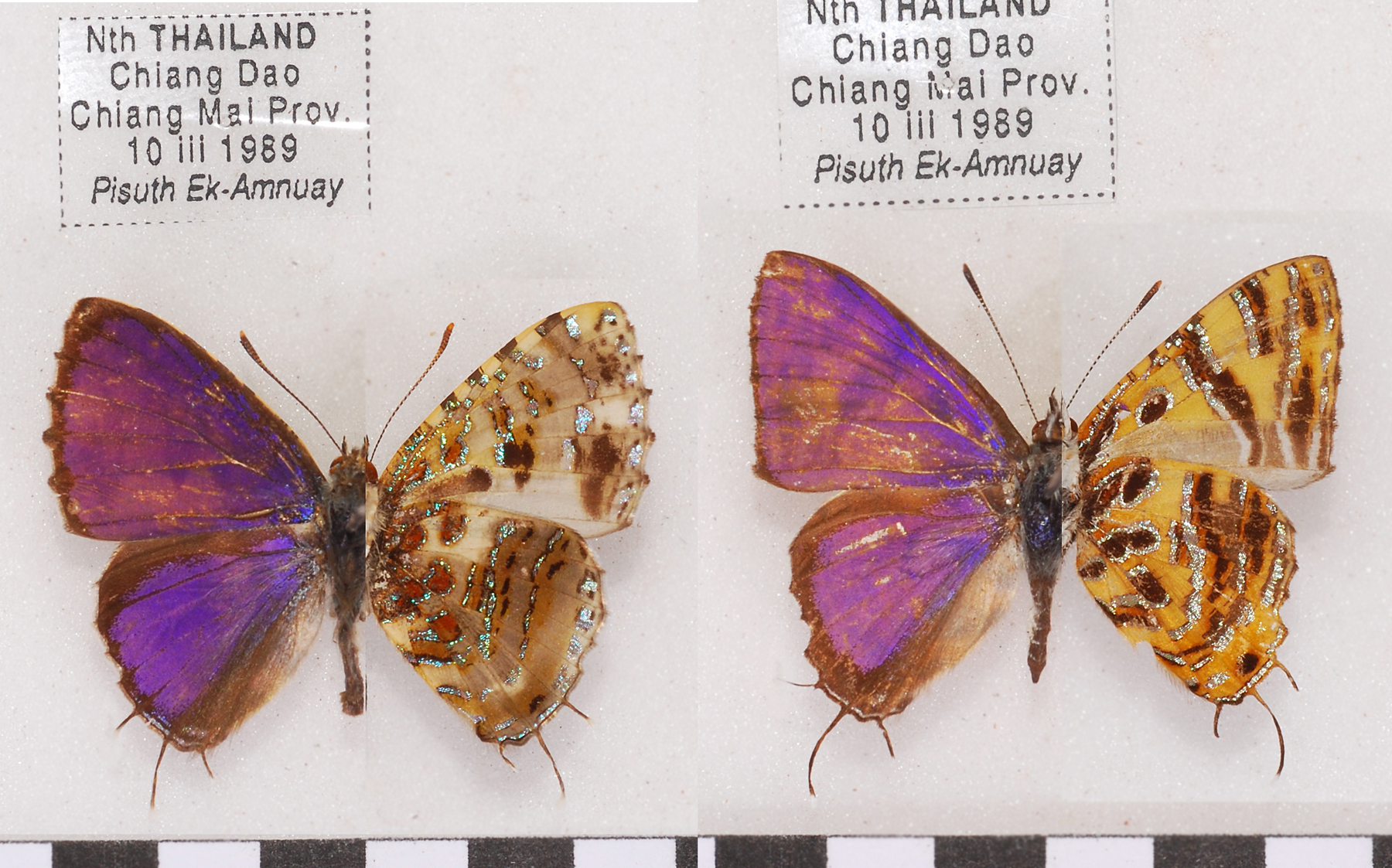
- Catapaecilma major and Catapaecilma subochrea, males from northern Thailand

Scientific classification
- Domain: Eukaryota
- Kingdom: Animalia
- Phylum: Arthropoda
- Class: Insecta
- Order: Lepidoptera
- Family: Lycaenidae
- Tribe: Catapaecilmatini
- Genus: Catapaecilma; Butler, 1879

Species
- See text

Synonyms
- Catapoecilma Scudder, 1882

= Catapaecilma =

Genus of butterflies

Catapaecilma is a genus of butterflies in the family Lycaenidae. The species of this genus are found in the Indomalayan realm.

== Species (9) ==
- Catapaecilma elegans (Druce, 1873)
- Catapaecilma evansi Pendlebury, 1933 (Peninsular Malaya, Nias)
- Catapaecilma gracilis Semper, [1890] (Philippines)
- Catapaecilma harmani Cassidy, 1982 (Borneo, Brunei)
- Catapaecilma lila Eliot, 1967 (Peninsular Malaya)
- Catapaecilma major Druce, 1895 (India, Ceylon, Burma, Thailand, Laos, Peninsular Malaya, Singapore, Taiwan, northeast Sumatra, West Java)
- Catapaecilma nakamotoi Hayashi, 1979
- Catapaecilma nuydai Takanami, 1988 (Philippines, Mindanao, Mount Kitanglad)
- Catapaecilma subochrea Elwes, [1893] (Burma (Naga Hills to Dawei), Malaya, Thailand)
