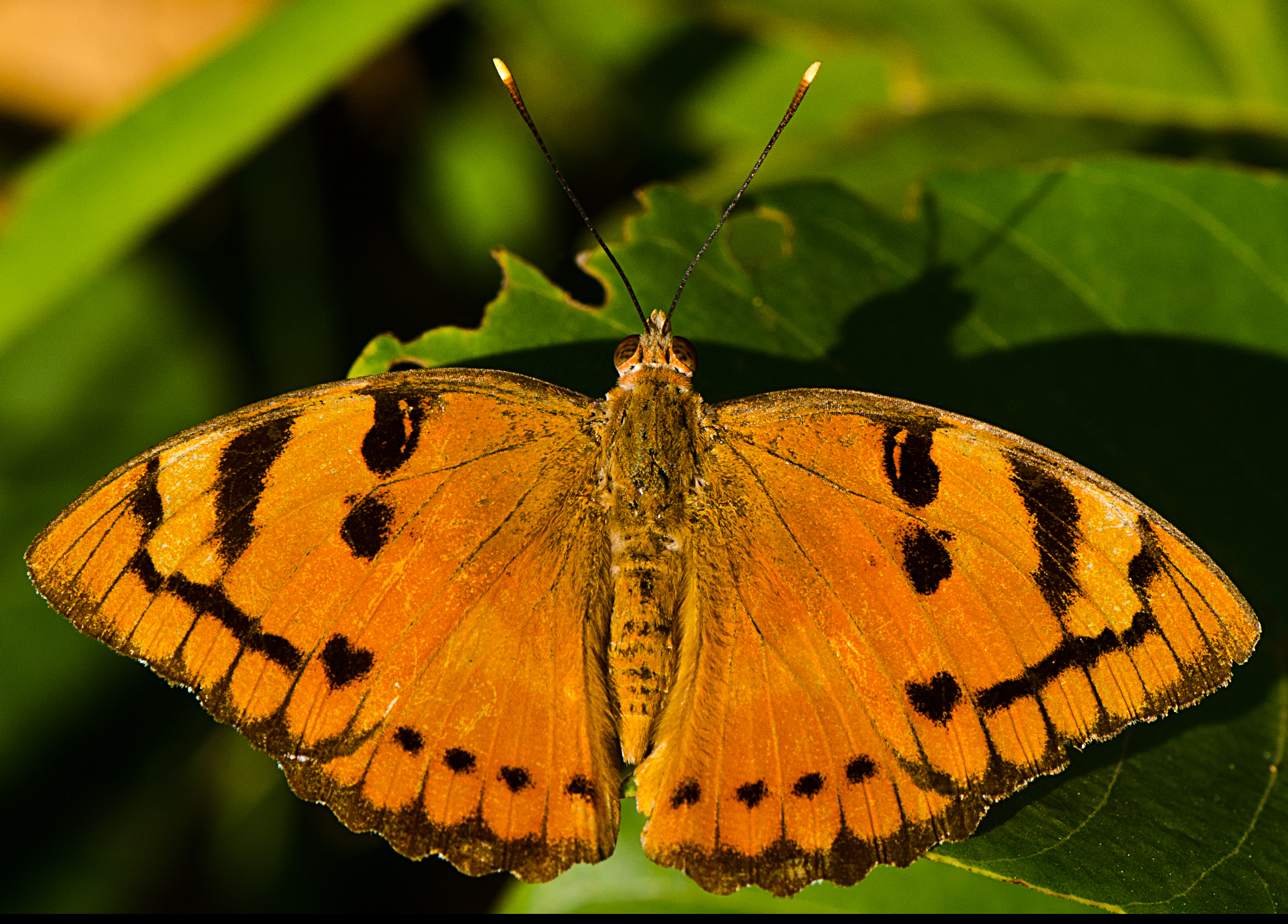
- upper side
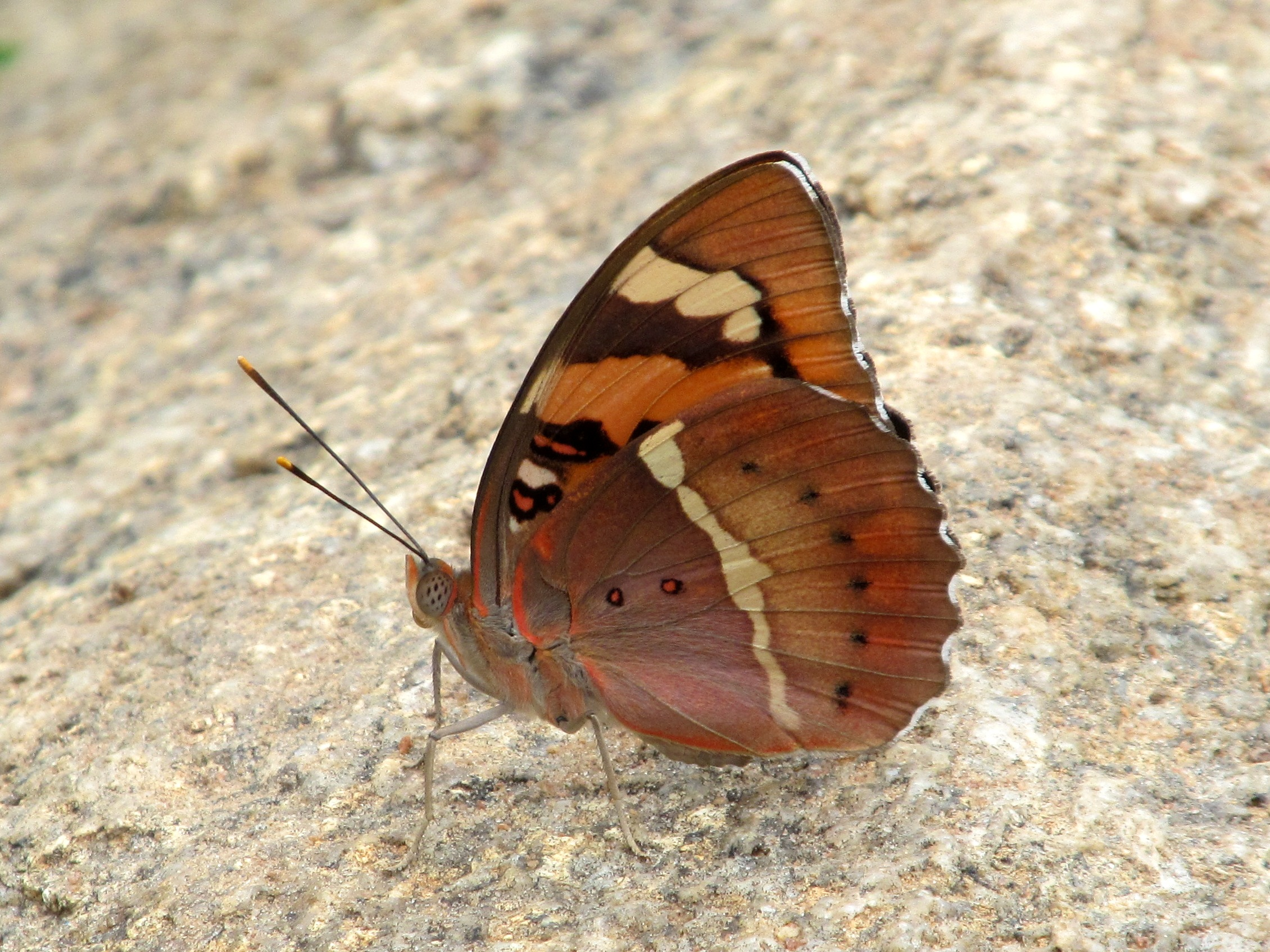
- underside

Scientific classification
- Kingdom: Animalia
- Phylum: Arthropoda
- Clade: Pancrustacea
- Class: Insecta
- Order: Lepidoptera
- Family: Nymphalidae
- Genus: Symphaedra; Hübner, 1819
- Species: S. nais

Binomial name
- Symphaedra nais Forster, 1771

Synonyms
- Symphaedra alcandra

= Symphaedra =

Baronet

Species of butterfly

Symphaedra nais, also known as the baronet, is a species of Nymphalid butterfly found in South Asia. It was formerly included in the genus Euthalia but it is a sister to members of the genus Bassarona.

== Description ==
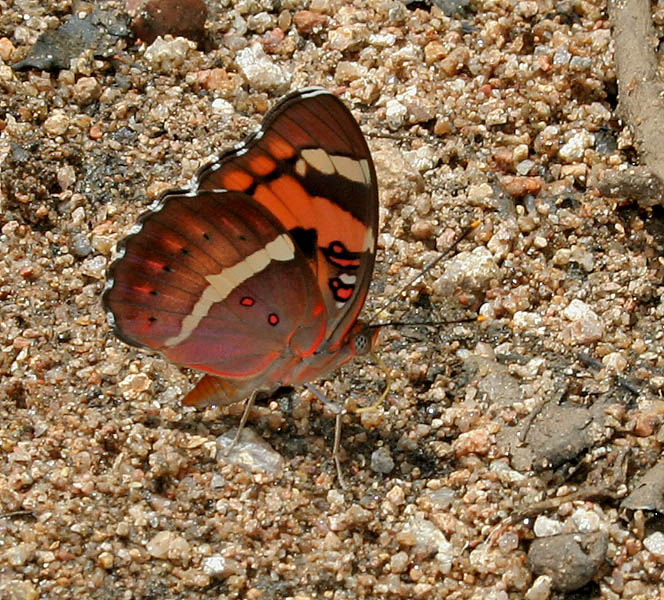
In Narsapur, Medak district, India

The male and the female both have tawny-yellow uppersides. The forewing has a traverse black line below apex cell and an oval spot beyond encircling a small yellow spot, a broad short oblique discal bar and an angulated postdiscal lunular band the costa narrowly and the termen shaded with black. Hindwing: a comparatively large triangular patch below the middle of the costa, a postdiscal evenly curved series of spots and a broad band along the termen black. Underside dark ochraceous red. Forewing: the base shaded with fuscous black, two spots at base of cell and a transverse line beyond crimson pink, edged with black: a very broad oblique discal band, angulated downwards below vein 4, bordered posteriorly by a large black spot on the inner side and outwardly and anteriorly by an oblique broad black band, followed by four anterior obliquely placed ochraceous-white spots, and beyond by a very narrow lunular black band bent downwards below vein 6. Hindwing: a crimson short line at extreme base, two crimson black-bordered spots in cell: a comparatively broad transverse discal white band often broken up into a large spot below middle of costa, with two or three spots in line below it; finally, a postdiscal series of small black spots. Antennae are black, bright ochraceous at apex; head, thorax and abdomen tawny red above, brown shaded with crimson-pink below.

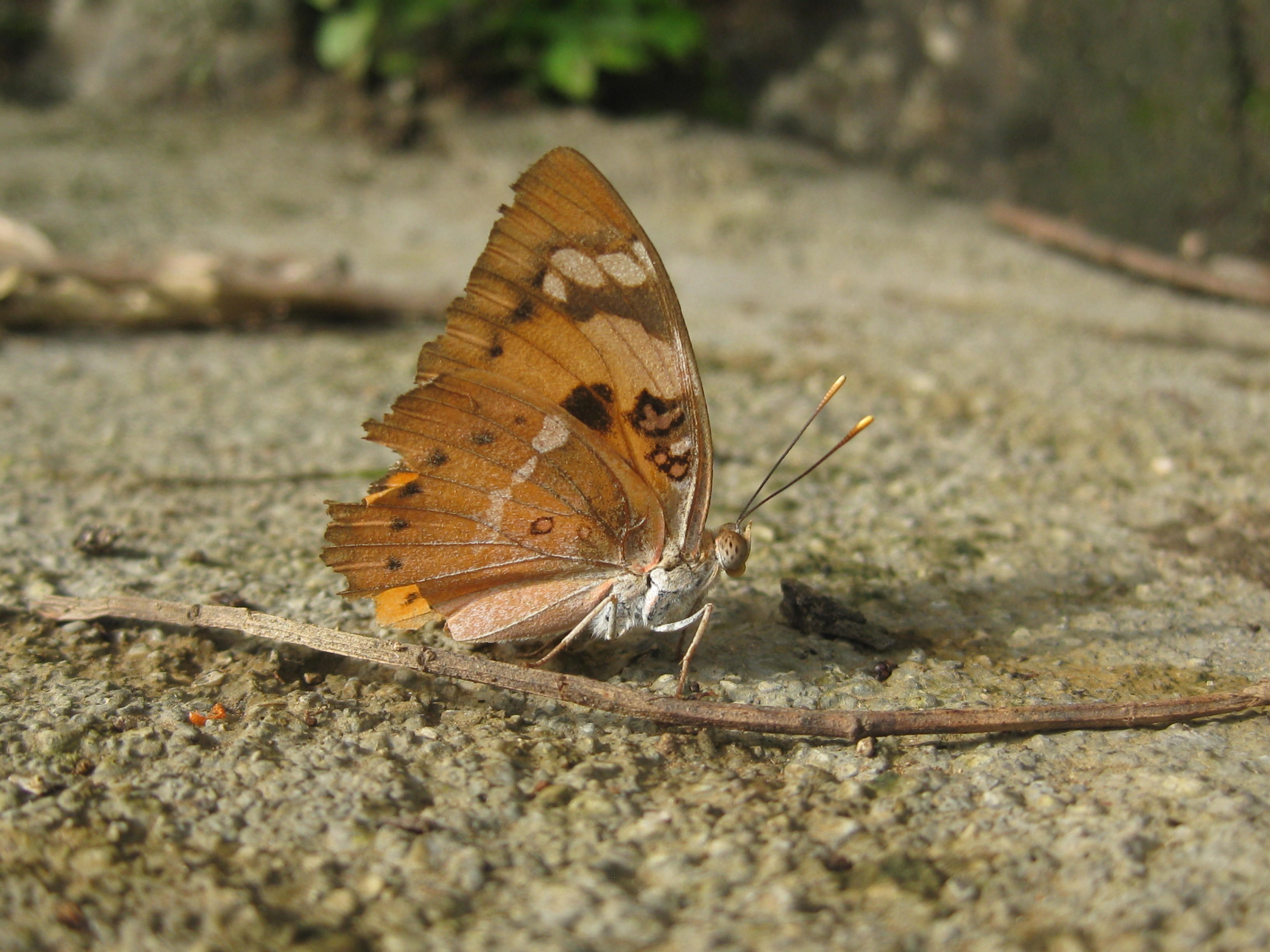
Under side; Bhenskatri, Dang, Gujarat, India

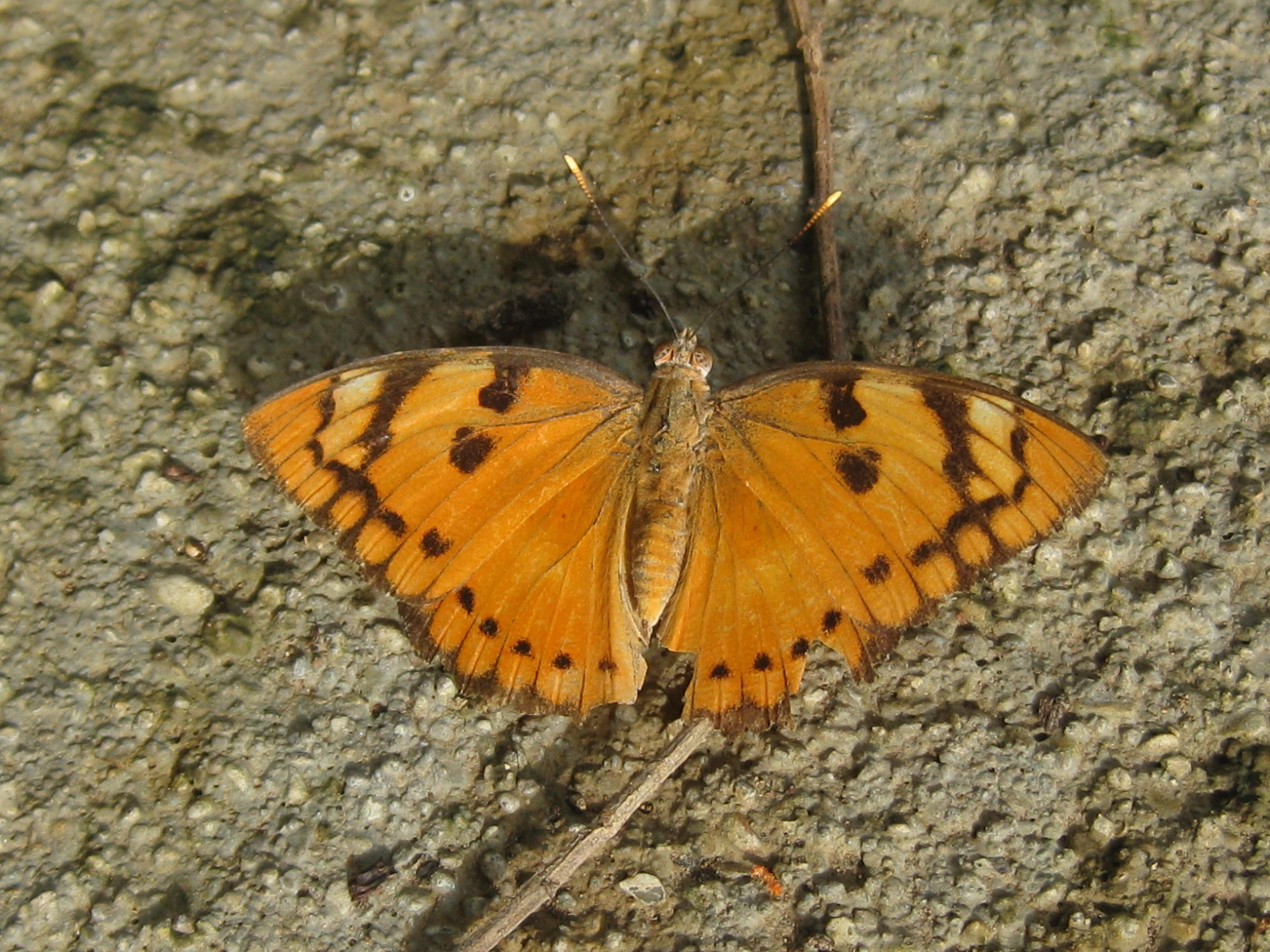
Upperside; Bhenskatri, Dang, Gujarat

== Distribution ==
It is widely found in India and Sri Lanka. In India its distribution ranges from lower Himalayas to southern India In Sri Lanka, it is restricted to savannah environments in Nilgala and Rathugala areas of Gal Oya National park of Uva province.

== Life cycle ==
=== Larva ===
The larva is light green with the purple spots on the dorsal. The sides of the larva contain row of ten horizontal spines covered with fine green hair.

=== Pupa ===
The pupa is short broad and triangular. It is green and has gold spots and lines.

== Larval host plants ==
The larvae are known to breed on Shorea robusta and Diospyros melanoxylon.

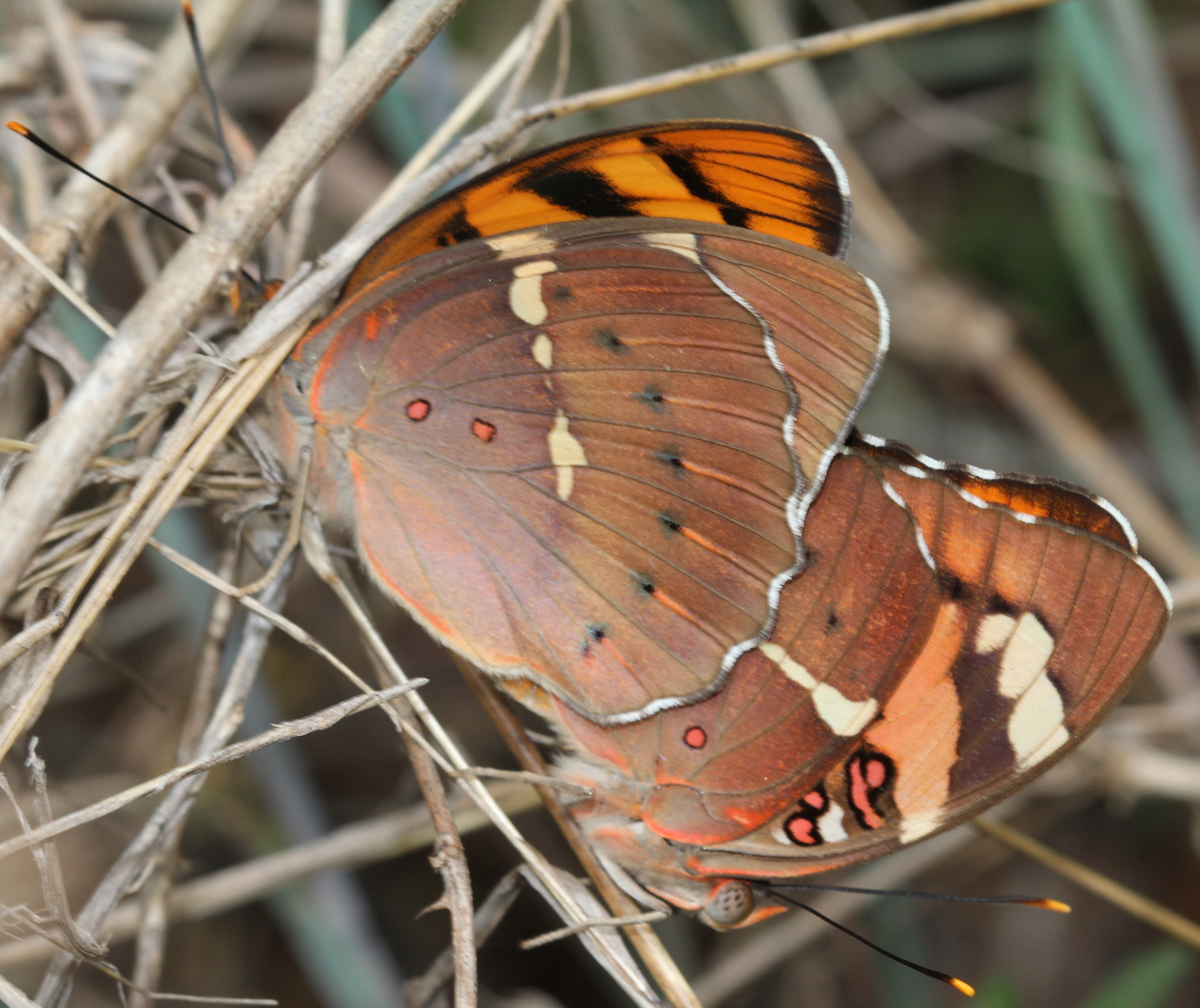
Mating pair

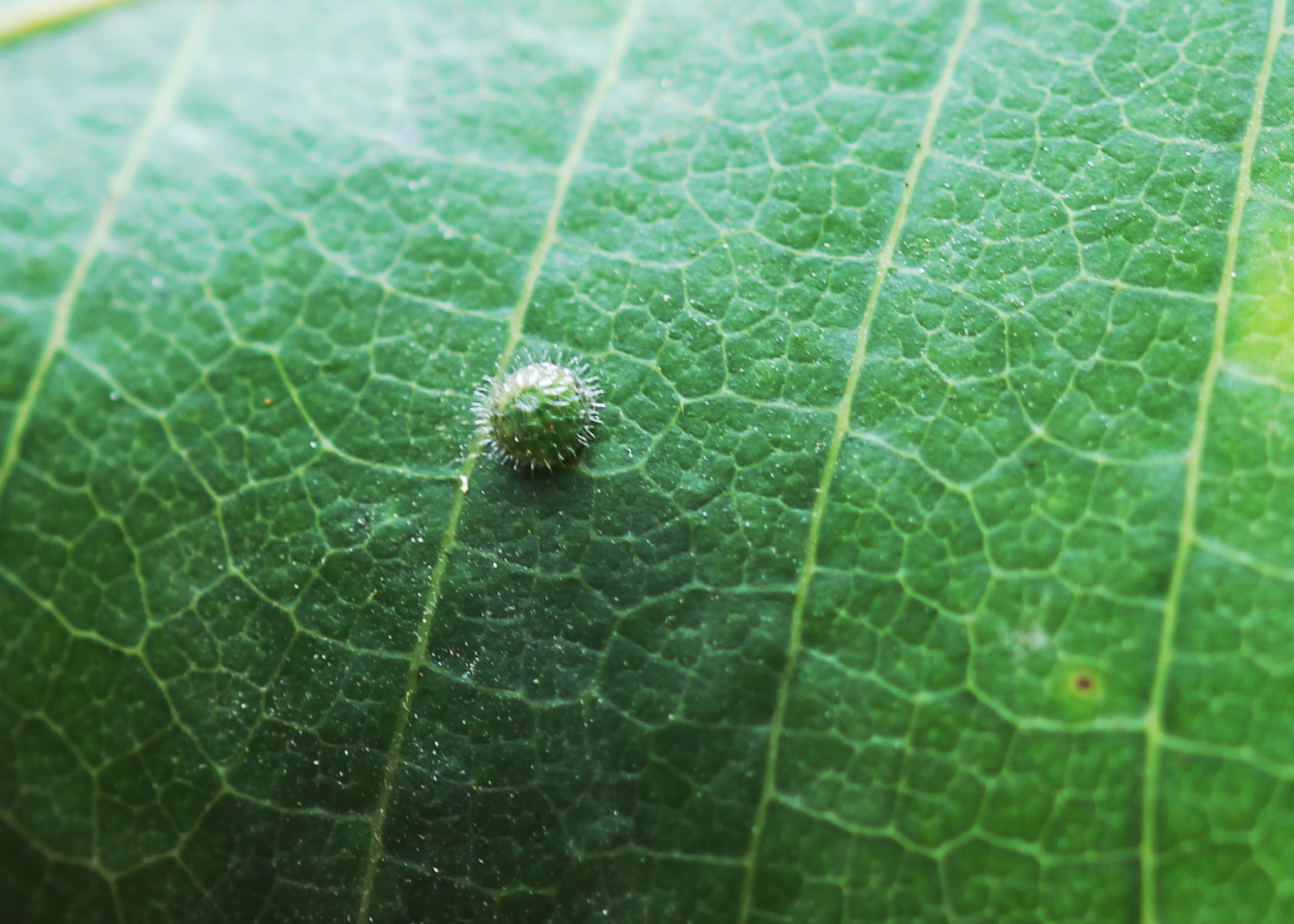
Egg

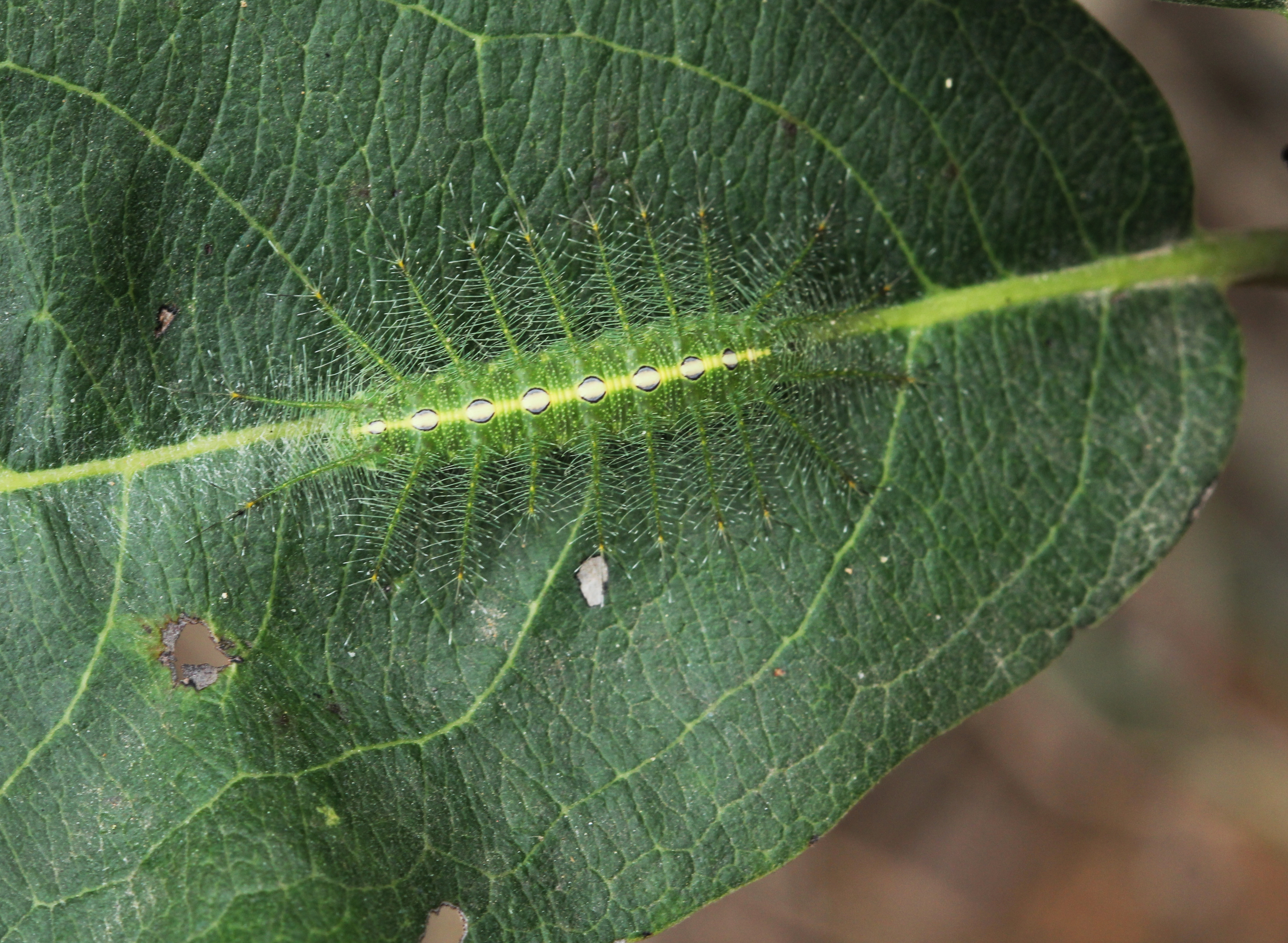
Caterpillar
