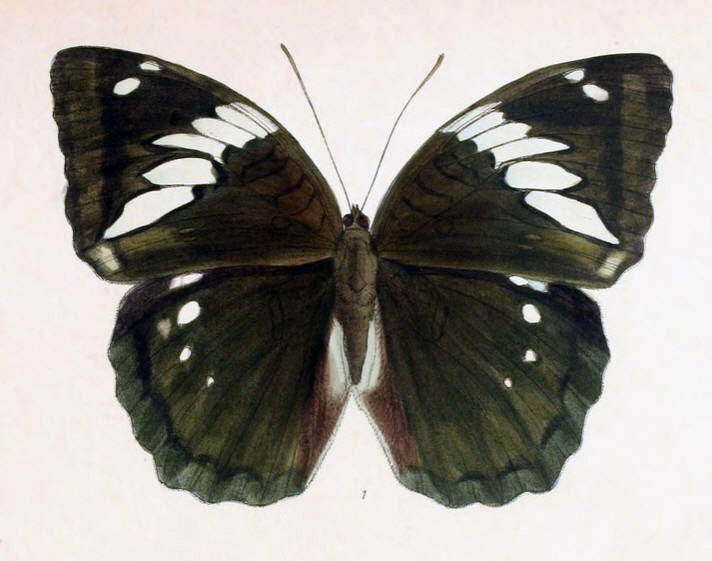

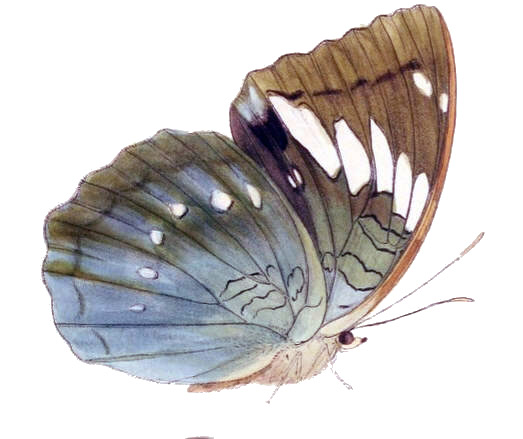

Scientific classification
- Domain: Eukaryota
- Kingdom: Animalia
- Phylum: Arthropoda
- Class: Insecta
- Order: Lepidoptera
- Family: Nymphalidae
- Genus: Bassarona
- Species: B. iva

Binomial name
- Bassarona iva (Moore, 1857)

Synonyms
- Adolias iva Moore, [1858]

= Bassarona iva =

Grand duke

Species of butterfly

Bassarona iva, the grand duke, is a species of nymphalid butterfly found in the Himalayas.

== Range ==
It is found in Sikkim, Bhutan, Assam, Manipur, and the southern Shan States of Myanmar.

== Subspecies ==
- Bassarona iva iva (Sikkim, Assam and possibly Bhutan)
- Bassarona iva cooperi Tytler (southern Shan States)
