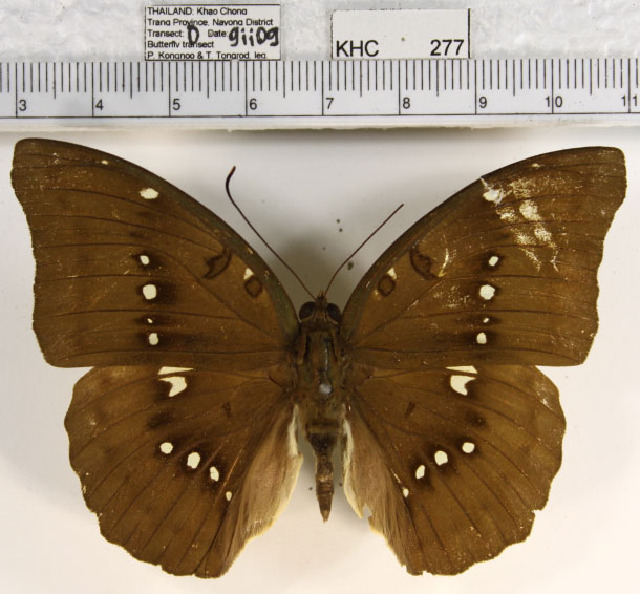

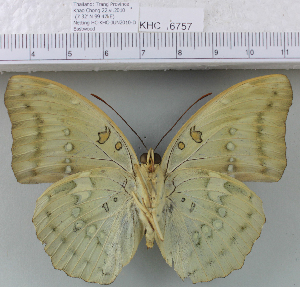

Scientific classification
- Domain: Eukaryota
- Kingdom: Animalia
- Phylum: Arthropoda
- Class: Insecta
- Order: Lepidoptera
- Family: Nymphalidae
- Genus: Bassarona
- Species: B. dunya

Binomial name
- Bassarona dunya (Doubleday, [1848])

Synonyms
- Adolias dunya Doubleday, [1848]; Rangasa dunya; Euthalia dunya; Euthalia saidja van de Poll, 1895

= Bassarona dunya =

Species of butterfly

Bassarona dunya, the great marquis, is a butterfly of the family Nymphalidae. It is found in South-East Asia.

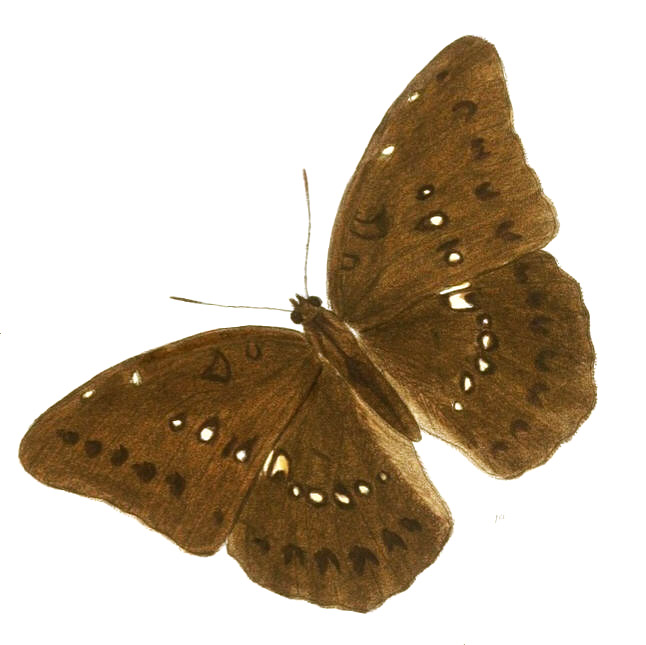
Illustration

== Subspecies ==
- Bassarona dunya dunya (southern Burma to Peninsular Malaya)
- Bassarona dunya mahara Fruhstorfer (Java)
- Bassarona dunya manaya Fruhstorfer (Sumatra)
- Bassarona dunya monara Fruhstorfer (Borneo and possibly Palawan)
- Bassarona dunya saidja (van de Poll, 1895) (Nias)
