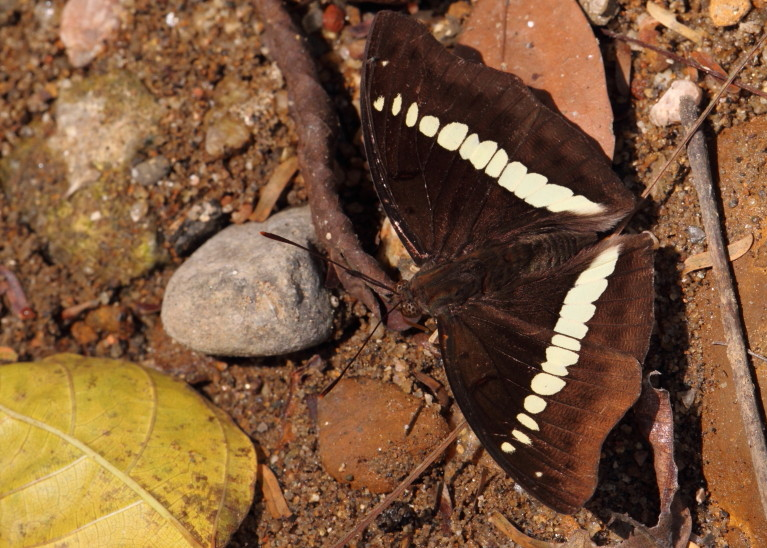
- from Meghalaya

Scientific classification
- Kingdom: Animalia
- Phylum: Arthropoda
- Clade: Pancrustacea
- Class: Insecta
- Order: Lepidoptera
- Family: Nymphalidae
- Genus: Bassarona
- Species: B. teuta

Binomial name
- Bassarona teuta (Doubleday, 1848)

Synonyms
- Adolias teuta Doubleday, [1848]; Euthalia teuta; Euthalia goodrichi Distant, 1886; Bassarona affinis Lathy, 1900

= Bassarona teuta =

Banded marquis

Species of butterfly

Bassarona teuta, the banded marquis, is a species of nymphalid butterfly.

This species is placed by some authors in the genus Euthalia, as Bassarona may be considered only a subgenus.

== Subspecies ==
- B. t. teuta (Assam to Thailand)
- B. t. goodrichi (Distant, 1886) (southern Thailand, Peninsular Malaya, Pulau Tioman)
- B. t. affinis Lathy, 1900 (Siam)
- B. t. rayana (Morishita, 1968) (Langkawi)
- B. t. tiomanica Eliot, 1978 (Pulau Tioman)
- B. t. teutoides (Moore, 1877) (Andamans)
- B. t. gupta (de Nicéville, 1886) (southern Burma)
- B. t. eurus (de Nicéville, 1894) (Sumatra)
- B. t. yapana Fruhstorfer (Batu Island)
- B. t. externa (de Nicéville, 1894) (Nias)
- B. t. eion (de Nicéville, 1894) (Java)
- B. t. veyana Fruhstorfer (Flores)
- B. t. bellata (Druce, 1873) (Borneo)
- B. t. ira (Moore, 1896) (Burma)
- B. t. salpona (Fruhstorfer, 1909) (Natuna Island)
- B. t. eson (de Nicéville, 1894) (Palawan)

== Description ==
Bassarona teuta can reach a wingspan of 60–80 millimetres (2.4–3.1 in). The upperside of the wings is dark brown, with a discal band composed of a continuous series of cream-colored spots. A small spot is present near the apex of the forewings. The underside of the wings is pale brown. Females are quite similar but larger and much paler, with a pale bluish-white discal band.

== Range ==
This species can be found in Assam, Myanmar, Malaya, Thailand, Pulau Tioman, Langkawi, Andamans, Java, Sumatra, Borneo, Batu Islands, Nias, Flores, Natuna Islands and Palawan.

== Similar species ==
- Euthalia recta

== Gallery ==
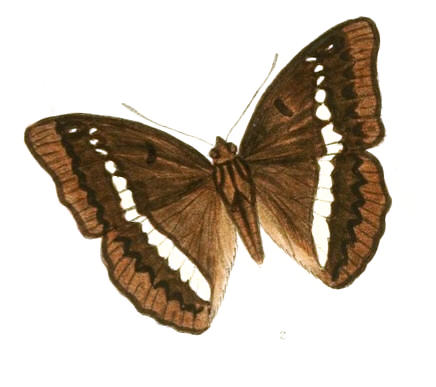
Illustration of Bassarona teuta form gupta

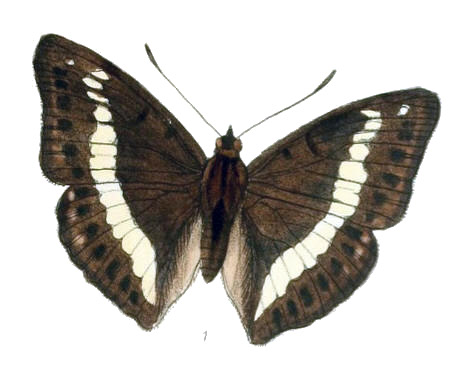
Illustration of Bassarona teuta, dorsal view

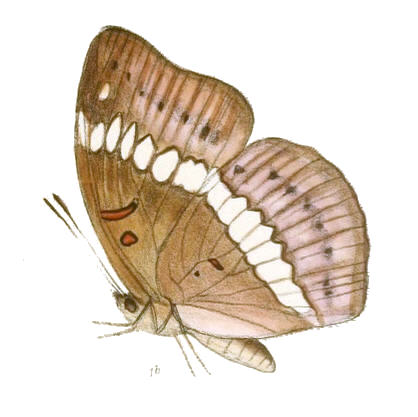
Lateral view
