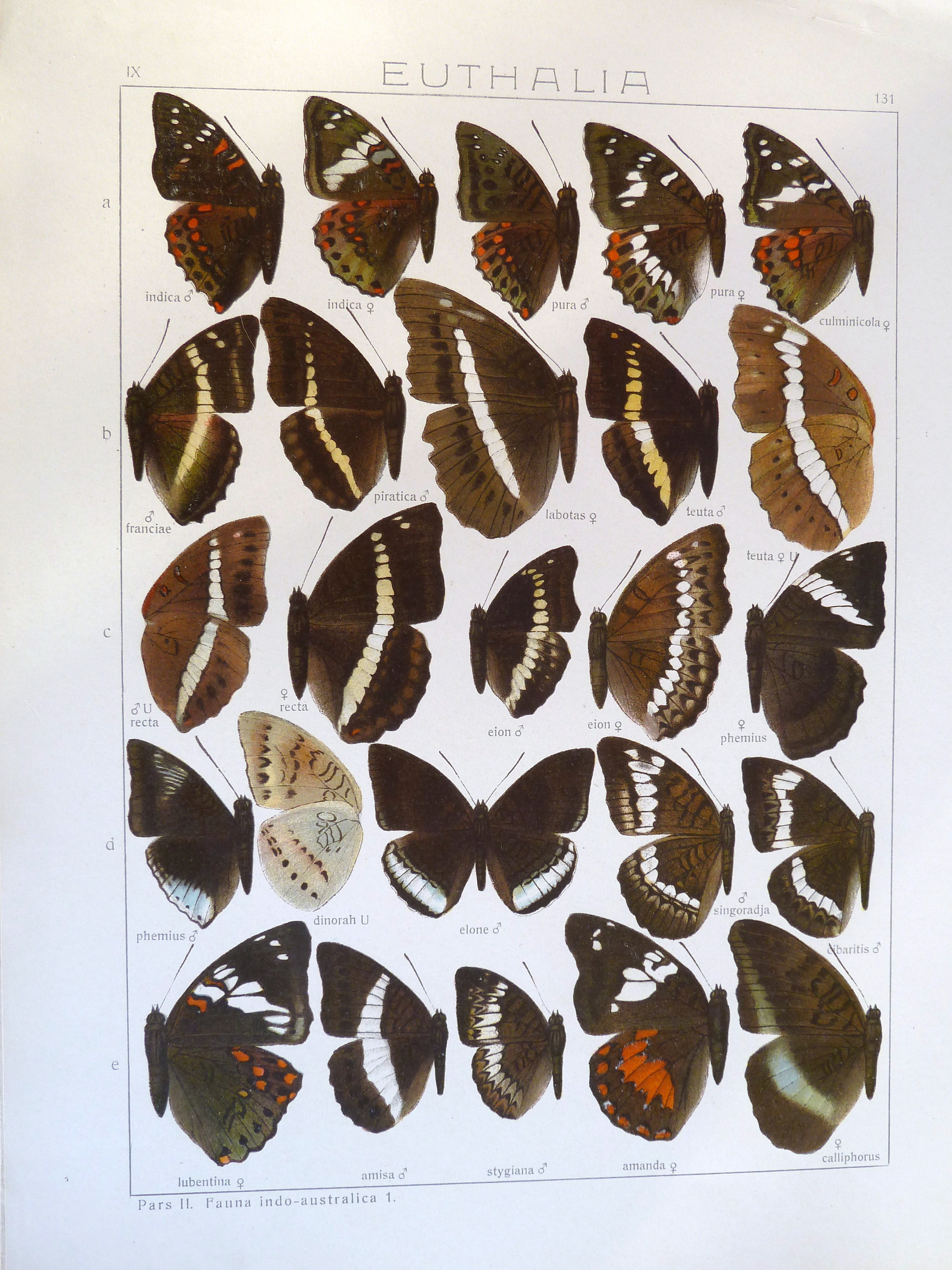
- in Seitz b

Scientific classification
- Domain: Eukaryota
- Kingdom: Animalia
- Phylum: Arthropoda
- Class: Insecta
- Order: Lepidoptera
- Family: Nymphalidae
- Genus: Bassarona
- Species: B. piratica

Binomial name
- Bassarona piratica Semper, 1888

= Bassarona piratica =

Species of butterfly

Bassarona piratica is a species of butterfly in the family Nymphalidae. It is endemic to the Philippines.

== Taxonomy ==
B. piratica has the following subspecies:

- B. piratica spp. medaga (Fruhstorfer, 1913)
- B. piratica spp. piratica
- B. piratica spp. sarmana (Fruhstorfer, 1913)
