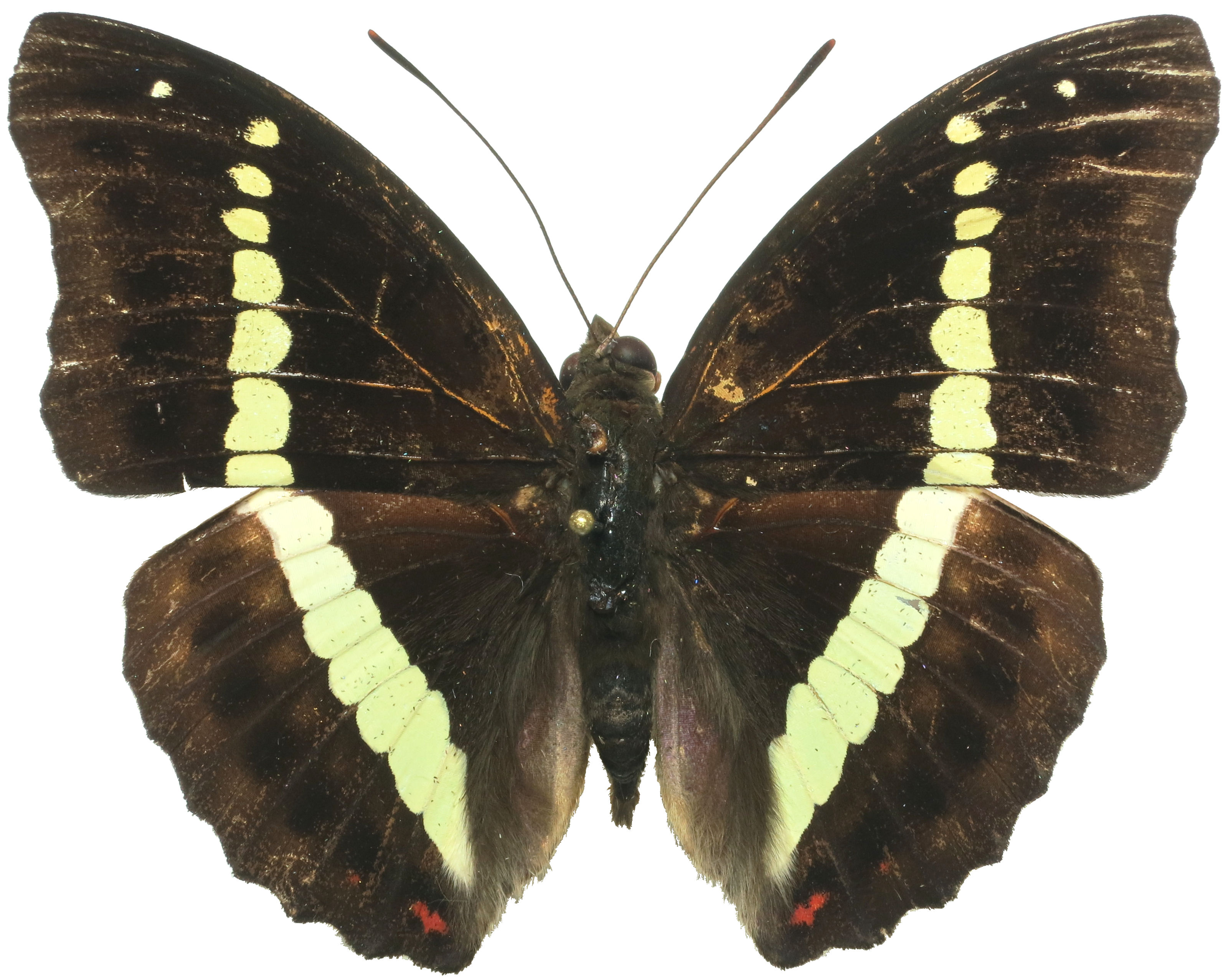
- B. recta - Binh Than, Vietnam

Scientific classification
- Kingdom: Animalia
- Phylum: Arthropoda
- Class: Insecta
- Order: Lepidoptera
- Family: Nymphalidae
- Genus: Bassarona
- Species: B. recta

Binomial name
- Bassarona recta (de Nicéville, 1886)

Synonyms
- Symphaedra recta de Nicéville, 1886; Euthalia recta; Bassarona monilis Moore, [1897]

= Bassarona recta =

Redtail marquis

Species of butterfly

Bassarona recta, the redtail marquis, is a species of nymphalid butterfly found in South and South-East Asia. E. recta is much rarer than E. teuta, occurring like this in two broods, one of the dry-season with very broad longitudinal bands on both wings, female with monotonous red-brown under surface; the form of the wet-season having the under surface dark brown, richly clouded with black.

== Range ==
It is found in Assam, Myanmar, Thailand, Cambodia, Peninsular Malaysia and Langkawi.

== Subspecies ==
- Bassarona recta recta (Assam to Burma and possibly Thailand)
- Bassarona recta monilis Moore, [1897] (central Thailand, Peninsular Malaya, Langkawi)
