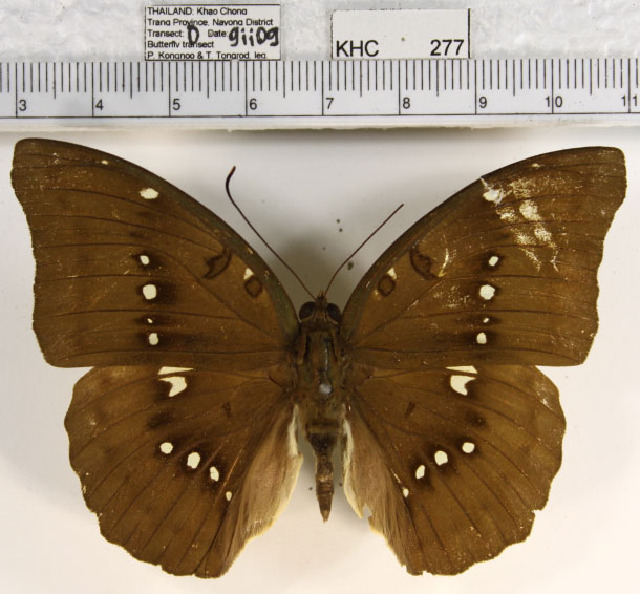
- Bassarona dunya

Scientific classification
- Domain: Eukaryota
- Kingdom: Animalia
- Phylum: Arthropoda
- Class: Insecta
- Order: Lepidoptera
- Family: Nymphalidae
- Tribe: Adoliadini
- Genus: Bassarona; Moore, [1897]

Species
- Numerous, see text

Synonyms
- Labranga Moore, [1897]; Rangasa Moore, [1897]; Labranga Moore, [1898]

= Bassarona =

Genus of brush-footed butterflies

Bassarona is a genus of brush-footed butterflies found in India and Southeast Asia.

They are large, powerful, more or less brownish butterflies. The upperside is brown with a row of white spots that may flow together into a white transverse band. The underside is light grey-brown.

== Selected species ==
- Bassarona byakko (Uehara & Yoshida, 1995)
- Bassarona dunya (Doubleday, [1848]) – great marquis
- Bassarona durga (Moore, [1858]) – blue duke
- Bassarona iva (Moore, [1858]) – grand duke
- Bassarona labotas (Hewitson, 1864)
- Bassarona piratica (Semper, 1888)
- Bassarona recta (de Nicéville, 1886) – red-tailed marquis
- Bassarona teuta (Doubleday, [1848]) – banded marquis
