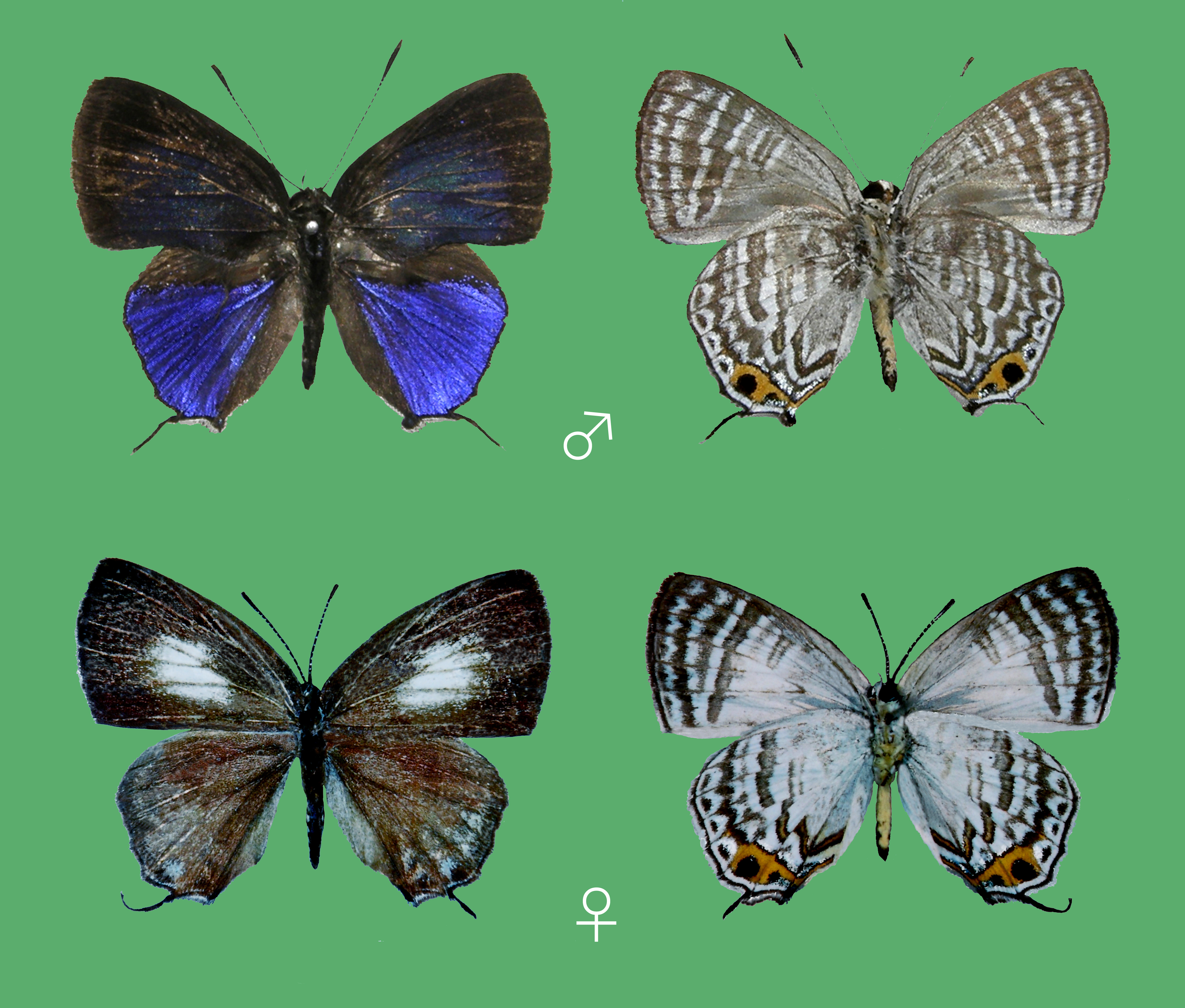
- Male and female

Scientific classification
- Kingdom: Animalia
- Phylum: Arthropoda
- Clade: Pancrustacea
- Class: Insecta
- Order: Lepidoptera
- Family: Lycaenidae
- Genus: Sinthusa
- Species: S. stephaniae

Binomial name
- Sinthusa stephaniae (H. Hayashi, Schröder & Treadaway, 1978)

= Sinthusa stephaniae =

Species of butterfly

Sinthusa stephaniae is a butterfly of the family Lycaenidae. It is found on the Philippine islands of Mindanao, Leyte, Negros and Samar. Sinthusa mindanensis stephaniae was raised to species status as Sinthusa stephaniae by Colin G. Treadaway and Heinz G. Schröder in 2012. The forewing length is 12–15 mm. The habitat of subspecies S. s. stephaniae and S. s. mindanensis overlaps on the islands of Mindanao and Leyte.

The specific name is dedicated to the third author's daughter Stephanie.

== Bibliography ==
- Hayashi, Hisakazu, Schröder, Heinz & Treadaway, Colin G. (1978). "New species of Rapala and Sinthusa from Mindanao (Lepidoptera: Lycaenidae)". Tyô to Ga. 29 (4): 215–219.
- Treadaway, C. G. (1995). "Checklist of the butterflies of the Philippine Islands (Lepidoptera: Rhopalocera)". Nachrichten des Entomologischen Vereins Apollo. Suppl. 14: 7–118.
- Takanami, Yusuke & Seki, Yasuo (April 1, 2001). "Edition 12". A Synonymic List of Lycaenidae from the Philippines. Archived from the original on June 14, 2001 – via Internet Archive.
- Treadaway, Colin G. & Schröder, Heinz (2012). "Revised checklist of the butterflies of the Philippine Islands". Nachrichten des Entomologischen Vereins Apollo. Suppl. 20: 1-64.
