= S. menglaensis =

S. menglaensis may refer to:

- Salacia menglaensis, a plant in the Celastraceae family
- Sarcocystis menglaensis, a protozoan parasite in the Sarcocystidae family
- Schefflera menglaensis, a plant in the Araliaceae family
- Semnostachya menglaensis, a synonym for Strobilanthes tonkinensis, a plant in the Acanthaceae family
- Seriana menglaensis, a leafhopper in the Cicadellidae family
- Sinthusa menglaensis, a butterfly in the Lycaenidae family
- Sphingonotus menglaensis, a species of grasshopper in the Acrididae family
- Sylvirana menglaensis, a synonym for Sylvirana nigrovittata, a species of frog in the Ranidae family
- Synanthedon menglaensis, a butterfly in the Sesiidae family
