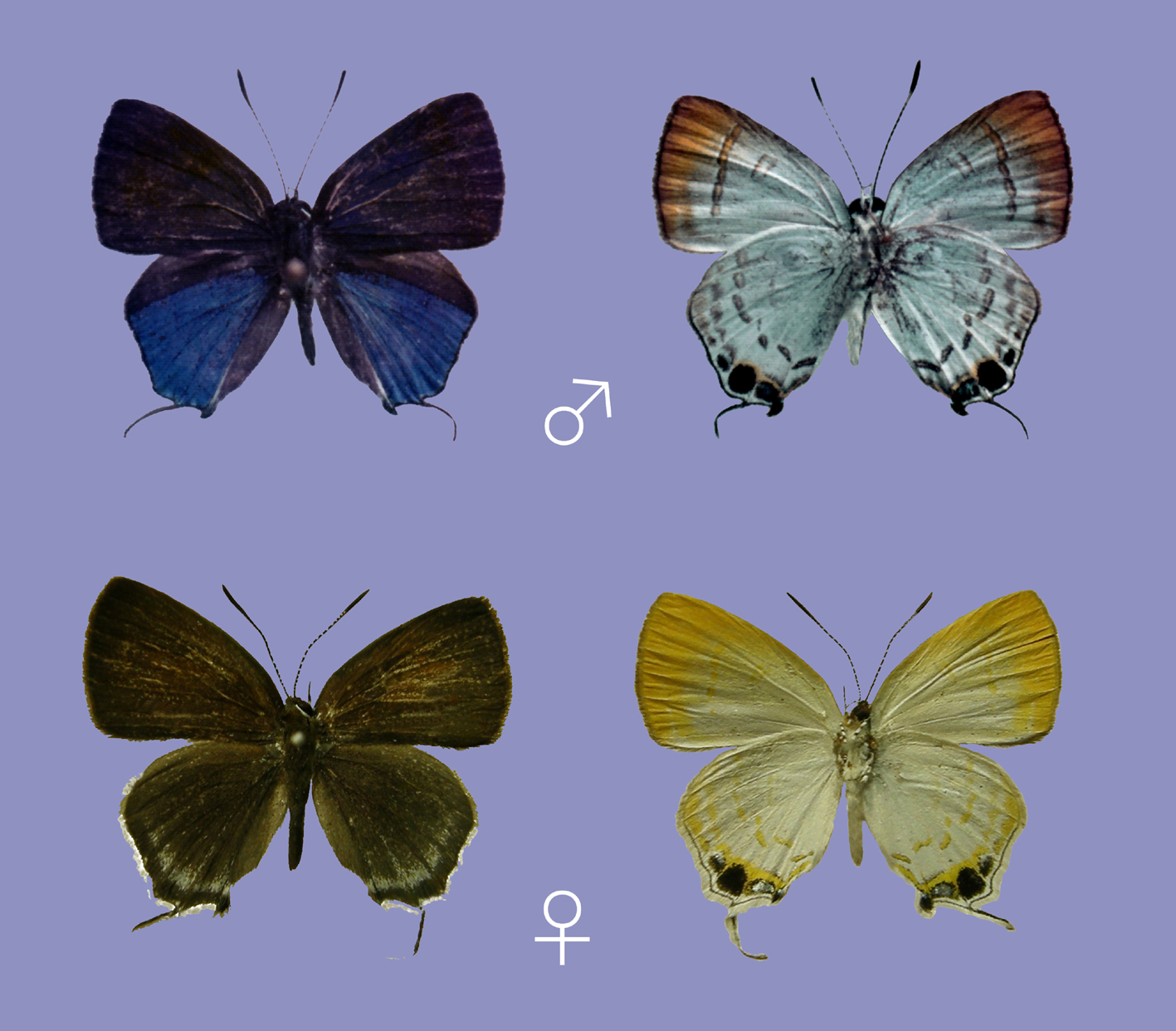
- Male and female

Scientific classification
- Kingdom: Animalia
- Phylum: Arthropoda
- Class: Insecta
- Order: Lepidoptera
- Family: Lycaenidae
- Genus: Sinthusa
- Species: S. kawazoei

Binomial name
- Sinthusa kawazoei H. Hayashi, 1976

= Sinthusa kawazoei =

Species of butterfly

Sinthusa kawazoei is a butterfly of the family Lycaenidae. It is endemic to the Philippines and found only on the island of Palawan. It was first described as a subspecies of Sinthusa privata distributed on Borneo. Treadaway and Schroeder raised its status to a distinct species in 2012. Forewing length is about 12–13 mm.

The specific name is dedicated to Dr. Akito KAWAZOE, Japanese lepidopterist.
