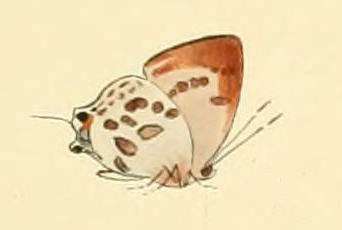

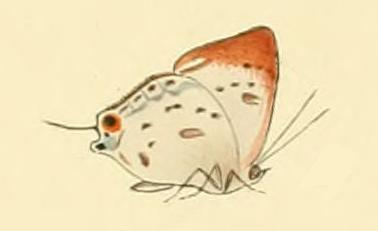

Scientific classification
- Kingdom: Animalia
- Phylum: Arthropoda
- Class: Insecta
- Order: Lepidoptera
- Family: Lycaenidae
- Genus: Sinthusa
- Species: S. malika

Binomial name
- Sinthusa malika (Horsfield, [1829])

Synonyms
- Thecla malika Horsfield, [1829]; Sinthusa amata Distant, 1886

= Sinthusa malika =

Species of butterfly

Sinthusa malika is a species of butterfly of the family Lycaenidae. It is found in South-East Asia.

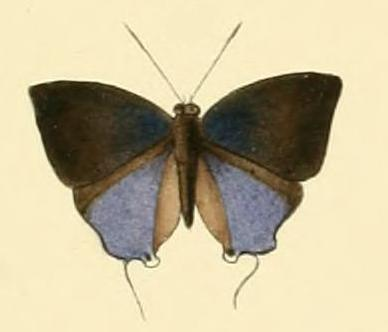

== Subspecies ==
- Sinthusa malika malika (Java)
- Sinthusa malika amata Distant, 1886 (southern Thailand, Peninsular Malaya, Langkawi, Sumatra)
- Sinthusa malika niasicola Fruhstorfer, 1912 (Nias)
