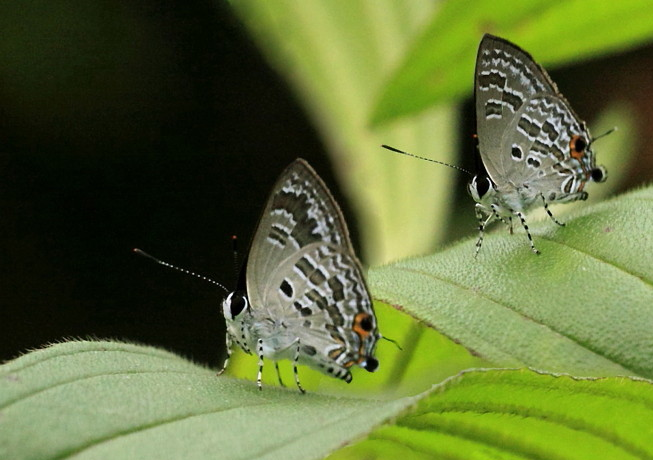

Scientific classification
- Kingdom: Animalia
- Phylum: Arthropoda
- Class: Insecta
- Order: Lepidoptera
- Family: Lycaenidae
- Genus: Sinthusa
- Species: S. chandrana

Binomial name
- Sinthusa chandrana (Moore, 1882)

= Sinthusa chandrana =

Broad spark

Species of butterfly

Sinthusa chandrana, the broad spark, is a small butterfly found in India that belongs to the lycaenids or blues family. The species was first described by Frederic Moore in 1882.

== See also ==
- List of butterflies of India
- List of butterflies of India (Lycaenidae)
