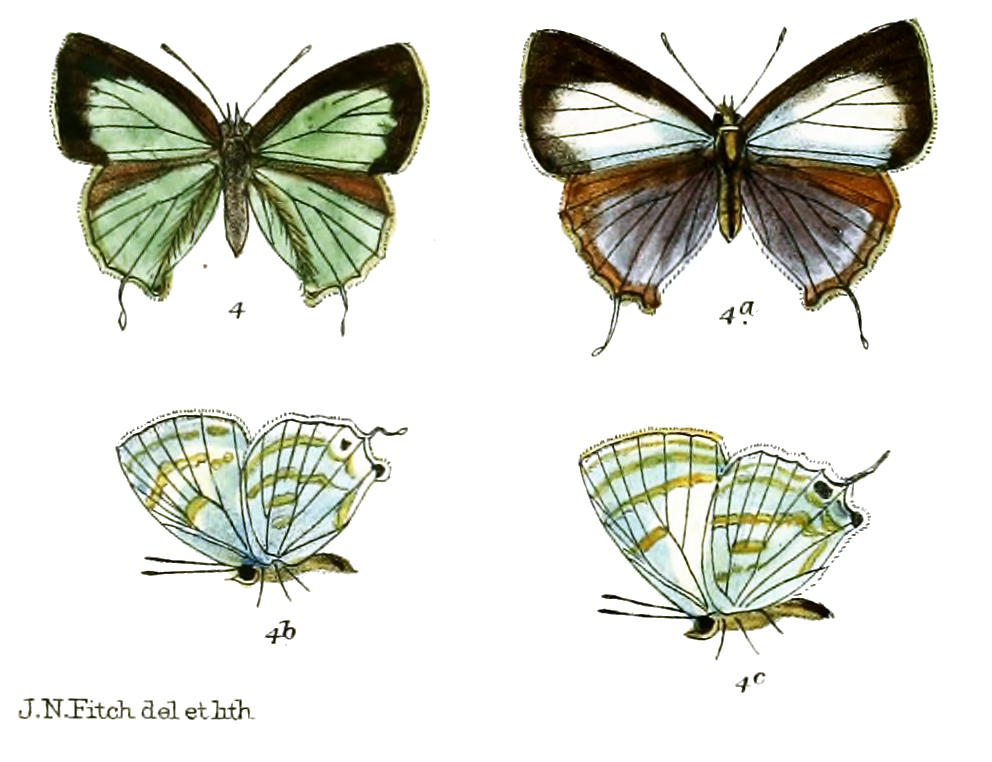
- Sinthusa virgo

Scientific classification
- Kingdom: Animalia
- Phylum: Arthropoda
- Class: Insecta
- Order: Lepidoptera
- Family: Lycaenidae
- Genus: Sinthusa
- Species: S. virgo

Binomial name
- Sinthusa virgo (Elwes 1887)

= Sinthusa virgo =

Pale spark

Species of butterfly

Sinthusa virgo, the pale spark, is a small butterfly found in India that belongs to the lycaenids or blues family.

== See also ==
- List of butterflies of India
- List of butterflies of India (Lycaenidae)
