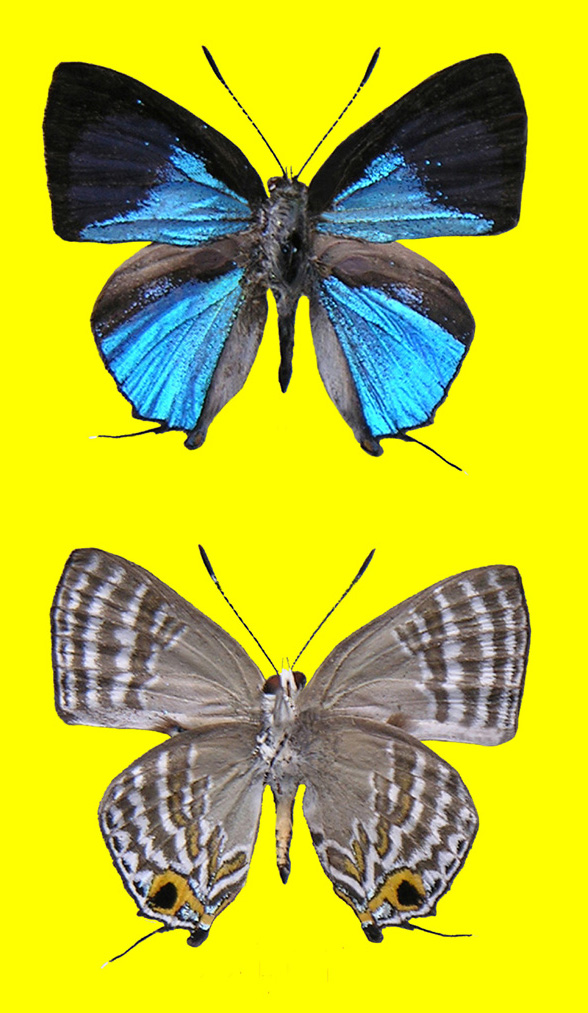
- Male, upperside and underside

Scientific classification
- Kingdom: Animalia
- Phylum: Arthropoda
- Class: Insecta
- Order: Lepidoptera
- Family: Lycaenidae
- Genus: Sinthusa
- Species: S. natsumiae

Binomial name
- Sinthusa natsumiae H. Hayashi, 1979

= Sinthusa natsumiae =

Species of butterfly

Sinthusa natsumiae is a butterfly of the family Lycaenidae first described by Hisakazu Hayashi in 1979. It is endemic to the Philippines and is found on many islands. It is very beautiful, especially on the forewing upperside of the male, where it has two brilliant blue colours. Its forewing length is about 12–15 mm

Etymology. The specific name is dedicated to the second daughter of the author.

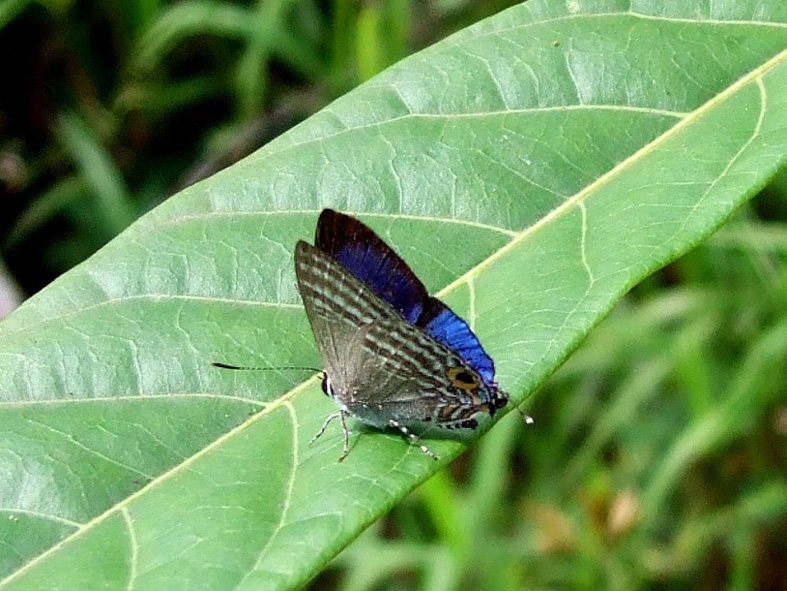
Male at Mandalagan volcano on Negros island

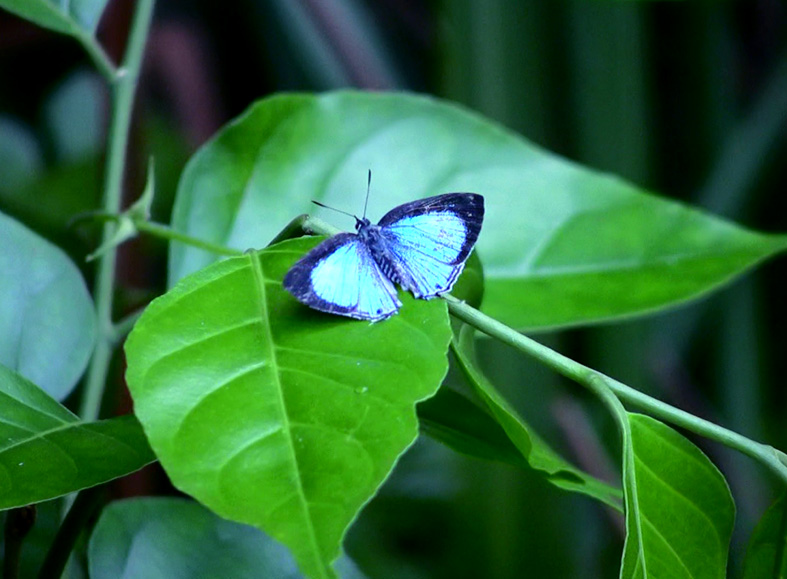
Female at Kanlaon Volcano on Negros

== Bibliography ==
- Hayashi, Hisakazu (1979). "New Lycaenid Butterflies from Mindanao, the Philippines". Tyô to Ga. 30 (1,2): 83–90.
- Treadaway, C. G. (1995). "Checklist of the butterflies of the Philippine Islands (Lepidoptera: Rhopalocera)". Nachrichten des Entomologischen Vereins Apollo. Suppl. 14: 7–118.
- Takanami, Yusuke & Seki, Yasuo (April 1, 2001). "Edition 12". A Synonymic List of Lycaenidae from the Philippines. Archived from the original on June 14, 2001 – via Internet Archive.
- Treadaway, Colin G. & Schröder, Heinz G. (2012). "Revised checklist of the butterflies of the Philippine Islands (Lepidoptera: Rhopalocera)". Nachrichten des Entomologischen Vereins Apollo. Suppl. 20: 1-64.
