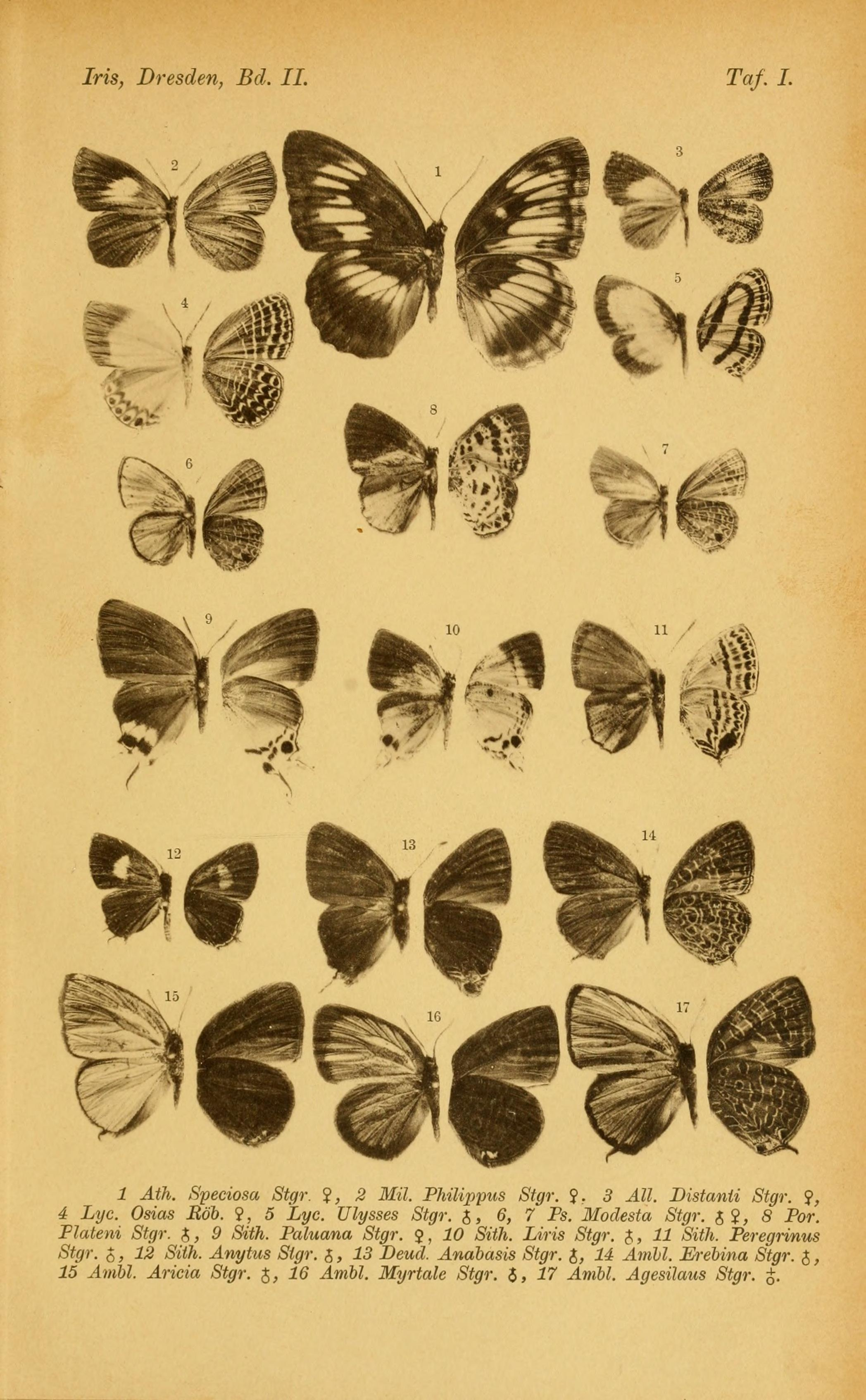

Scientific classification
- Kingdom: Animalia
- Phylum: Arthropoda
- Class: Insecta
- Order: Lepidoptera
- Family: Lycaenidae
- Genus: Sinthusa
- Species: S. peregrinus

Binomial name
- Sinthusa peregrinus (Staudinger, 1889)

Synonyms
- Sithon peregrinus Staudinger, 1889

= Sinthusa peregrinus =

Species of butterfly

Sinthusa peregrinus is a butterfly of the family Lycaenidae. It is endemic to Palawan in the Philippines.
