= Sinthusa menglaensis =

Scientific classification
- Kingdom: Animalia
- Phylum: Arthropoda
- Clade: Pancrustacea
- Class: Insecta
- Order: Lepidoptera
- Family: Lycaenidae
- Genus: Sinthusa
- Species: S. menglaensis

Binomial name
- Sinthusa menglaensis (Wang, 1997)

Synonyms
- Chilaria menglaensis

Species of butterfly

Sinthusa menglaensis, the Yunnan spark, is a butterfly in the family Lycaenidae. It is found in Yunnan and Arunachal Pradesh. It was described by Zhi-Guo Wang in 1997.

It was moved from the genus Chilaria (synonym of Hypolycaena) to Sinthusa because of wing venation.
