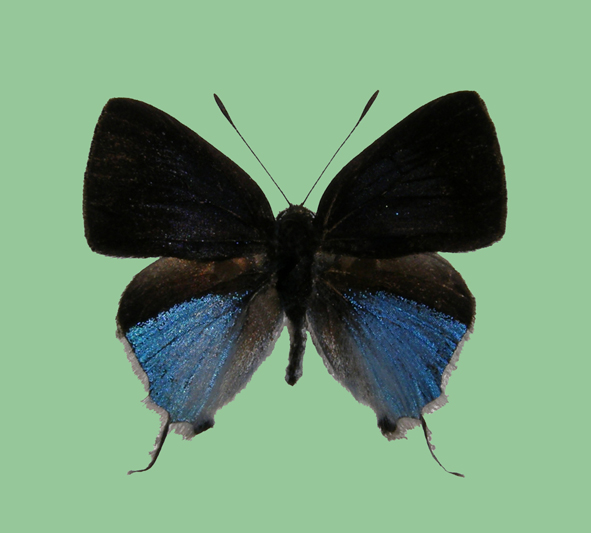
- Male upperside
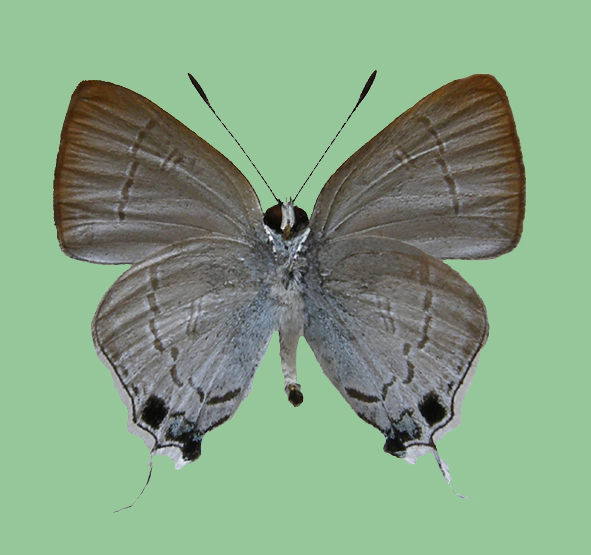
- Male underside

Scientific classification
- Kingdom: Animalia
- Phylum: Arthropoda
- Class: Insecta
- Order: Lepidoptera
- Family: Lycaenidae
- Genus: Sinthusa
- Species: S. makikoae

Binomial name
- Sinthusa makikoae H. Hayashi & Otsuka, 1985

= Sinthusa makikoae =

Species of butterfly

Sinthusa makikoae is a butterfly of the family Lycaenidae. Its forewing length is 12–13 mm. The species is very rare; it is endemic to Borneo and found only in Sabah.

Etymology. The specific name is dedicated to the daughter of the second author.
