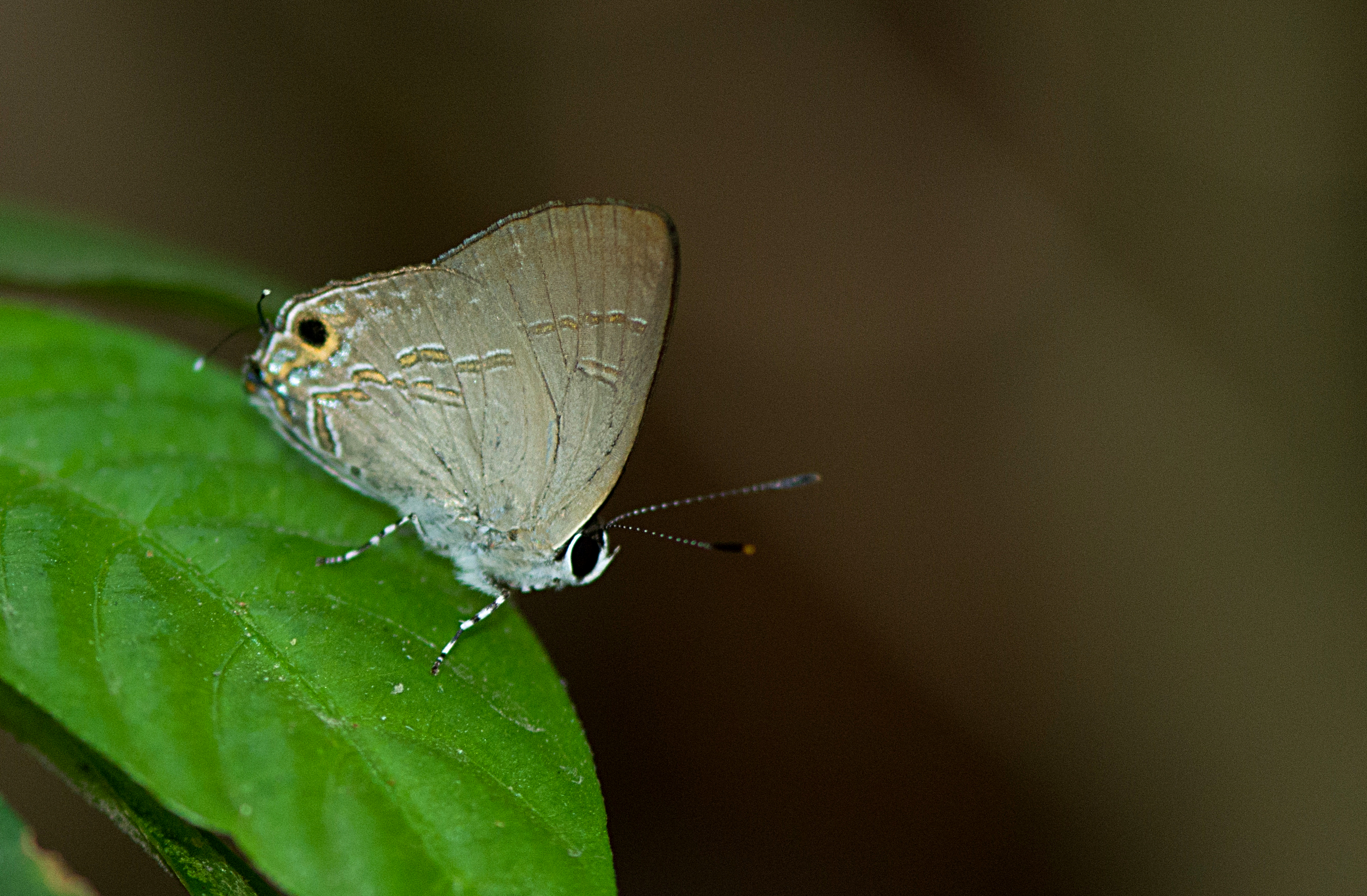

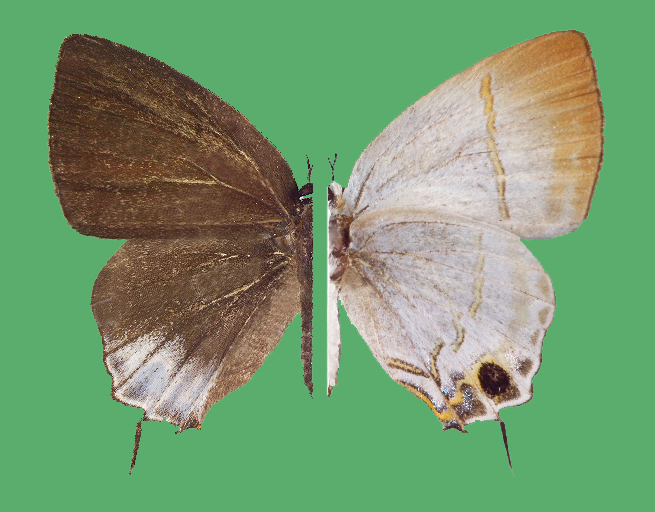
- Sinthusa nasaka ogatai

Scientific classification
- Kingdom: Animalia
- Phylum: Arthropoda
- Class: Insecta
- Order: Lepidoptera
- Family: Lycaenidae
- Genus: Sinthusa
- Species: S. nasaka

Binomial name
- Sinthusa nasaka (Horsfield 1829)

= Sinthusa nasaka =

Narrow spark

Species of butterfly

Sinthusa nasaka, the narrow spark, is a small butterfly found in India that belongs to the lycaenids or blues family.

Range: India to Taiwan, including Sundaland, the Philippines and Sulawesi (Hong Kong, Fujian, Guangxi and Hainan), Sikkim to Burma, Thailand, Laos, India (Meghalaya, Alipurduar, Darjeeling, Jalpaiguri and Nagaland), Bangladesh and Sunderland.

== See also ==
- List of butterflies of India
- List of butterflies of India (Lycaenidae)
