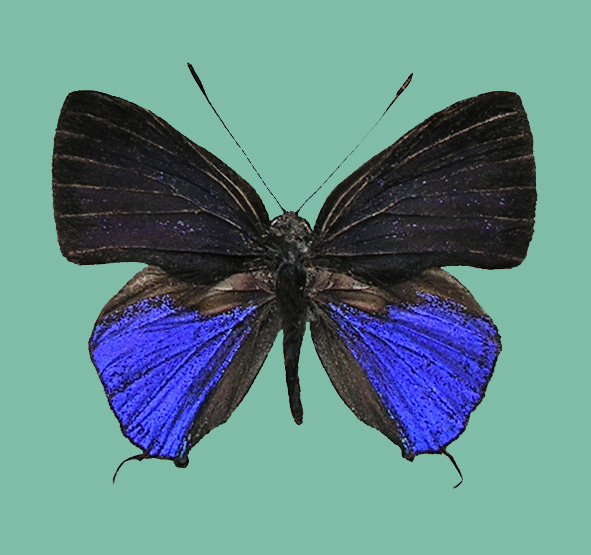
- Male upperside
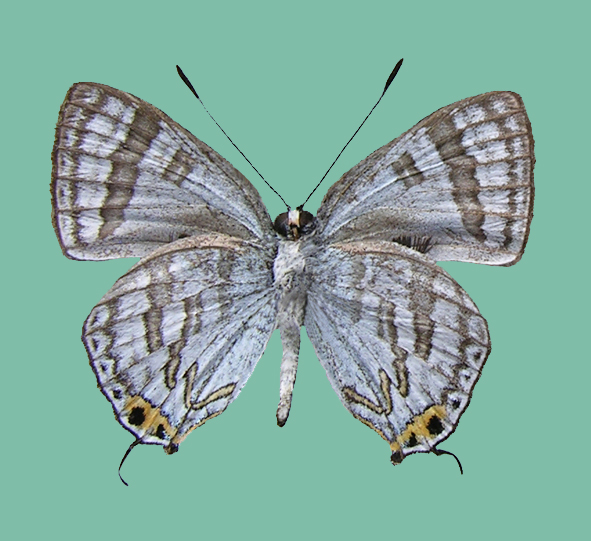
- Male underside

Scientific classification
- Kingdom: Animalia
- Phylum: Arthropoda
- Class: Insecta
- Order: Lepidoptera
- Family: Lycaenidae
- Genus: Sinthusa
- Species: S. mindanensis

Binomial name
- Sinthusa mindanensis H. Hayashi, Schröder & Treadaway, 1978

= Sinthusa mindanensis =

Species of butterfly

Sinthusa mindanensis is a butterfly of the family Lycaenidae first described by Hisakazu Hayashi, Heinz G. Schröder and Colin G. Treadaway in 1978. It is found on the Philippine islands of Mindanao and Leyte.

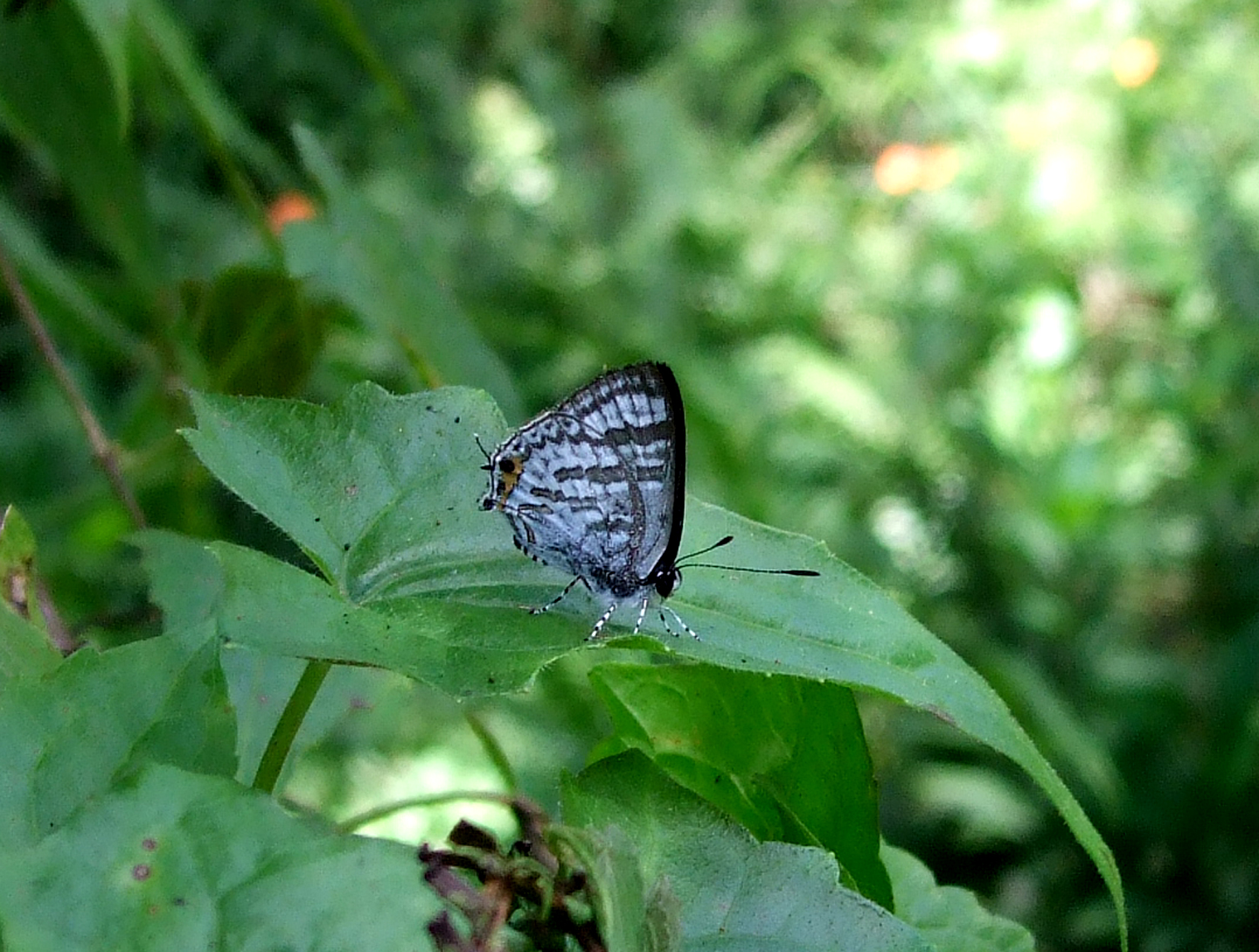
Male from Mount Apo on Mindanao
