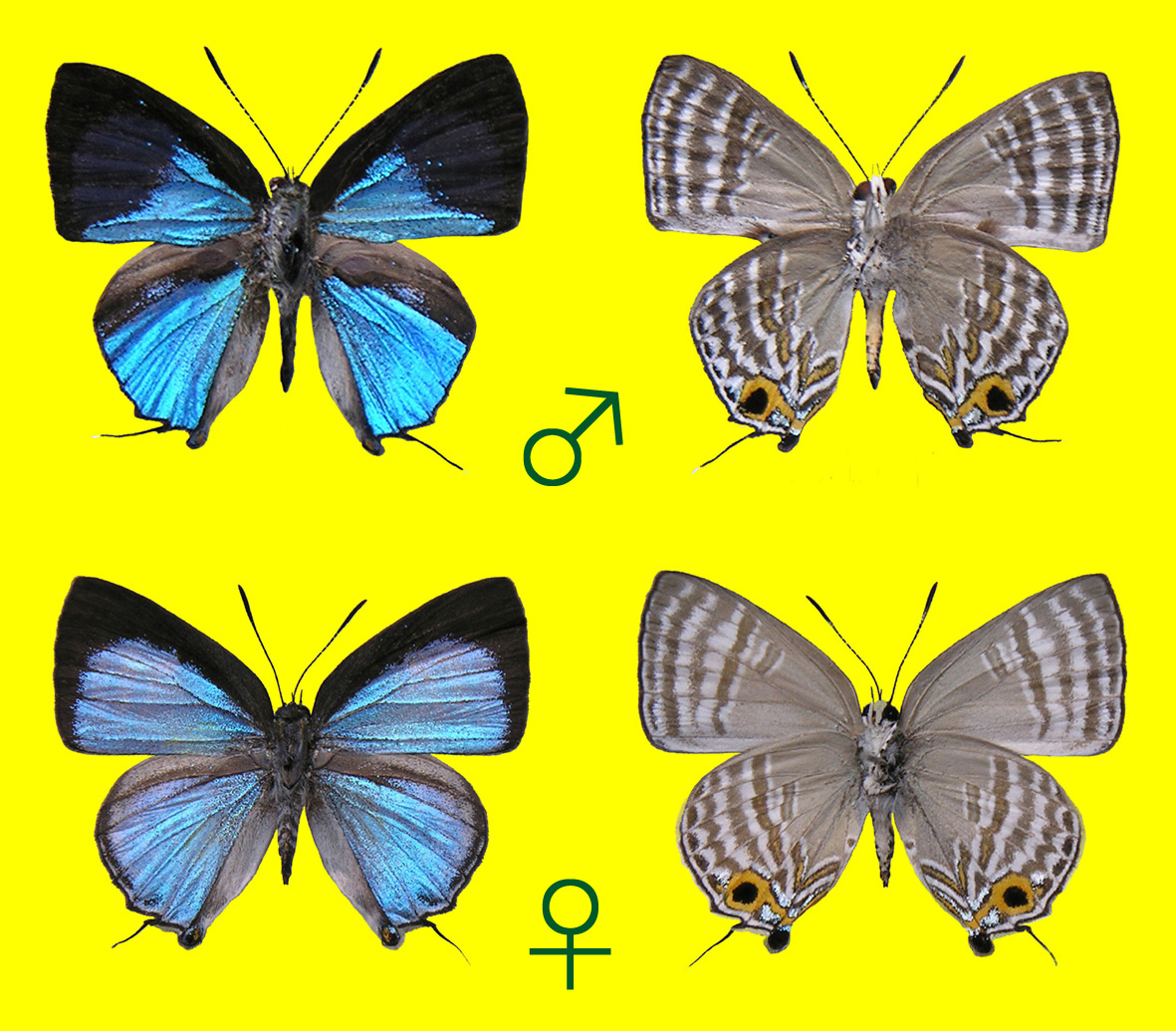
- Sinthusa natsumiae

Scientific classification
- Kingdom: Animalia
- Phylum: Arthropoda
- Class: Insecta
- Order: Lepidoptera
- Family: Lycaenidae
- Tribe: Deudorigini
- Genus: Sinthusa; Moore, 1884

= Sinthusa =

Butterfly genus in family Lycaenidae

Sinthusa is a genus of lycaenid butterflies, the sparks. They are small species with the male genitalia and secondary sexual characters of Virachola, but less robust and weaker in flight. The males are easily recognized, with the forewings oily indigo blue changing to shining blue in a side light and hindwings shining violet blue in all lights. The species of this genus are found in the Indomalayan realm. The genus was erected by Frederic Moore in 1884.

== Species ==
- Sinthusa chandrana Moore
- Sinthusa peregrinus Staudinger
- Sinthusa nasaka Horsfield
- Sinthusa malika Horsfield
- Sinthusa privata Fruhstorfer
- Sinthusa kawazoei H. Hayashi, 1976
- Sinthusa virgo Elwes
- Sinthusa makikoae H. Hayashi & Ohtsuka
- Sinthusa mindanensis H. Hayashi, Schröder & Treadaway
- Sinthusa natsumiae H. Hayashi
- Sinthusa stephaniae H. Hayashi, Schröder & Treadaway
