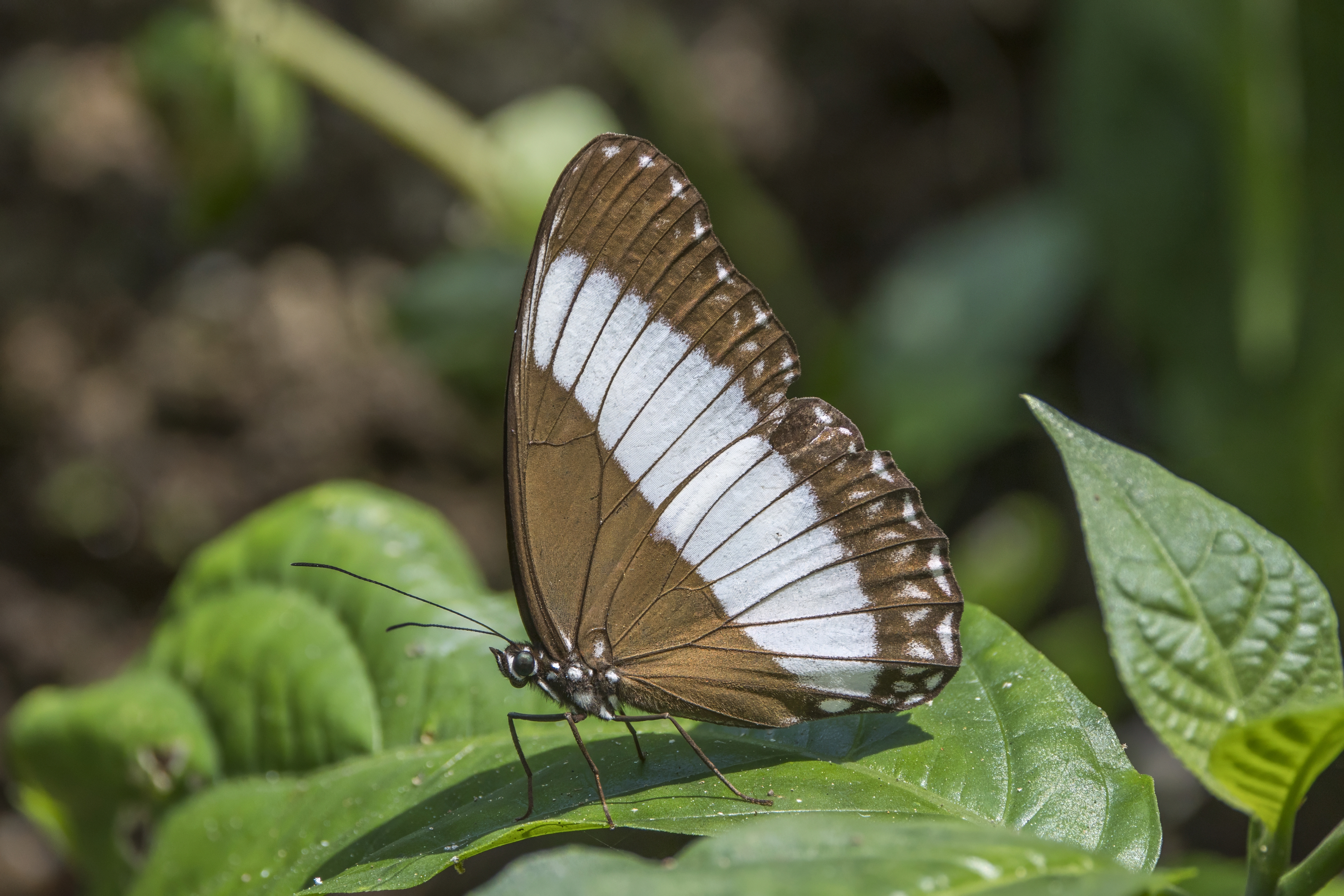
- Luzon, the Philippines

Scientific classification
- Kingdom: Animalia
- Phylum: Arthropoda
- Clade: Pancrustacea
- Class: Insecta
- Order: Lepidoptera
- Family: Nymphalidae
- Genus: Zethera
- Species: Z. pimplea

Binomial name
- Zethera pimplea (Erichson, 1834)

= Zethera pimplea =

Species of butterfly

Zethera pimplea, the northern Wallacean, is a butterfly endemic to the Philippines. It was described by Wilhelm Ferdinand Erichson in 1834.

== Subspecies ==
- Zethera pimplea pimplea
- Zethera pimplea diloris
