= A. audax =

A. audax may refer to:

- Abacetus audax, a ground beetle found in Chad and Côte d'Ivoire
- Acentrogobius audax, a goby found in the coasts of the Indian and western Pacific Oceans
- Agrilus audax, a jewel beetle found in North America
- Allotinus audax, a synonym of Allotinus fallax, a butterfly found in Asia
- Aphanotriccus audax, the black-billed flycatcher, a bird found in Colombia and Panama
- Aquila audax, the wedge-tailed eagle, a bird found in Australia
- Archips audax, a moth found in Japan
- Attus audax, a synonym of Phidippus audax, the bold jumping spider, native to North America
