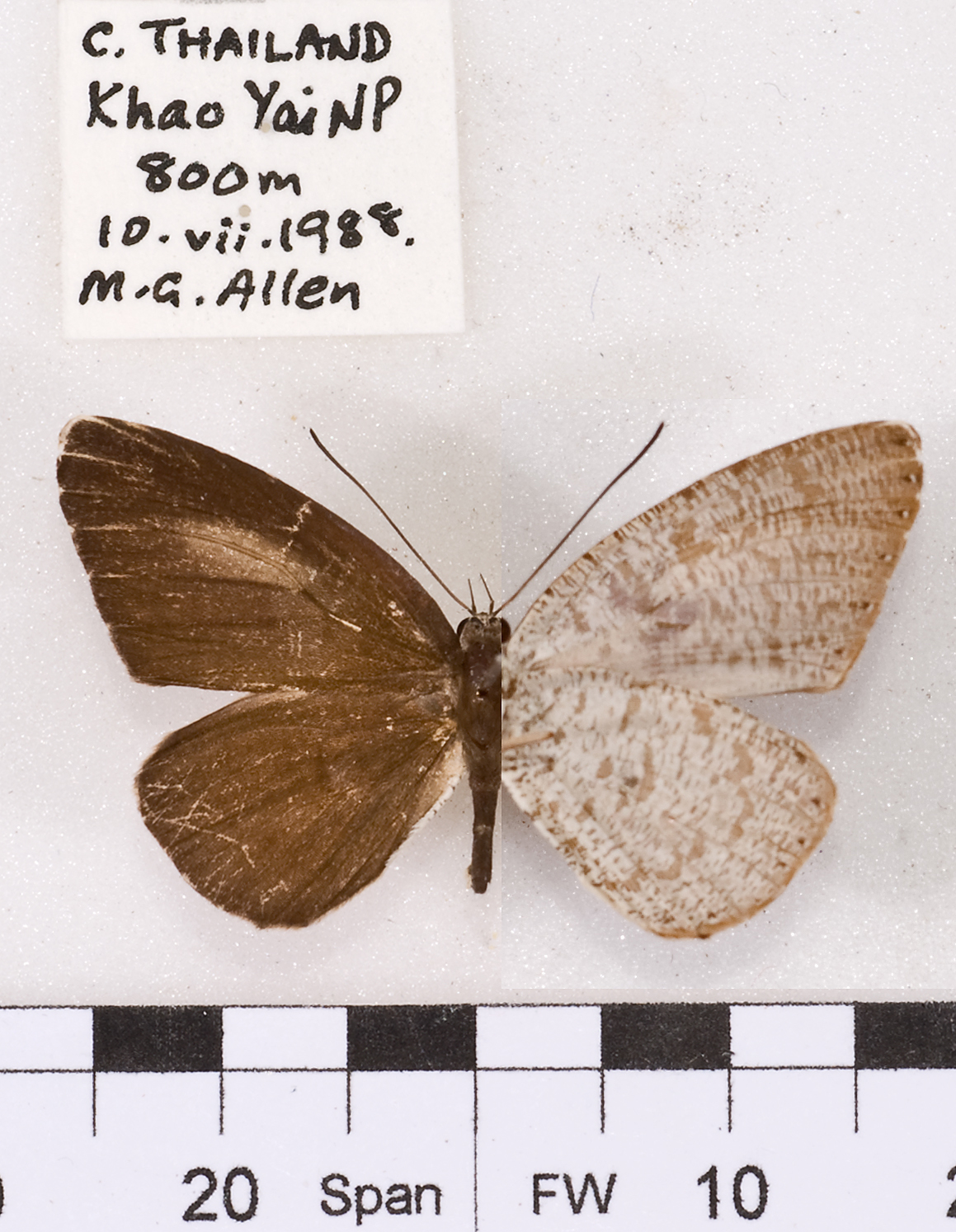

Scientific classification
- Kingdom: Animalia
- Phylum: Arthropoda
- Class: Insecta
- Order: Lepidoptera
- Family: Lycaenidae
- Genus: Allotinus
- Species: A. sarrastes

Binomial name
- Allotinus sarrastes Fruhstorfer, 1913

Synonyms
- Allotinus taras sarrastes Fruhstorfer, 1913; Allotinus porriginosus Toxopeus, 1932; Allotinus taras mendava Riley, 1944

= Allotinus sarrastes =

Species of butterfly

Allotinus sarrastes is a butterfly in the family Lycaenidae. It was described by Hans Fruhstorfer in 1913. It is found in Myanmar, Thailand, Langkawi, Peninsular Malaysia, Borneo, Karimata, Sumatra, Sipora, Java and Mindanao.Habitus larger than that of Sumatra-taras, lighter brown. Under surface in the male darker smoky-grey, in the female, however, lighter than in taras. The brown spotting more intense and combined to more distinct band.
