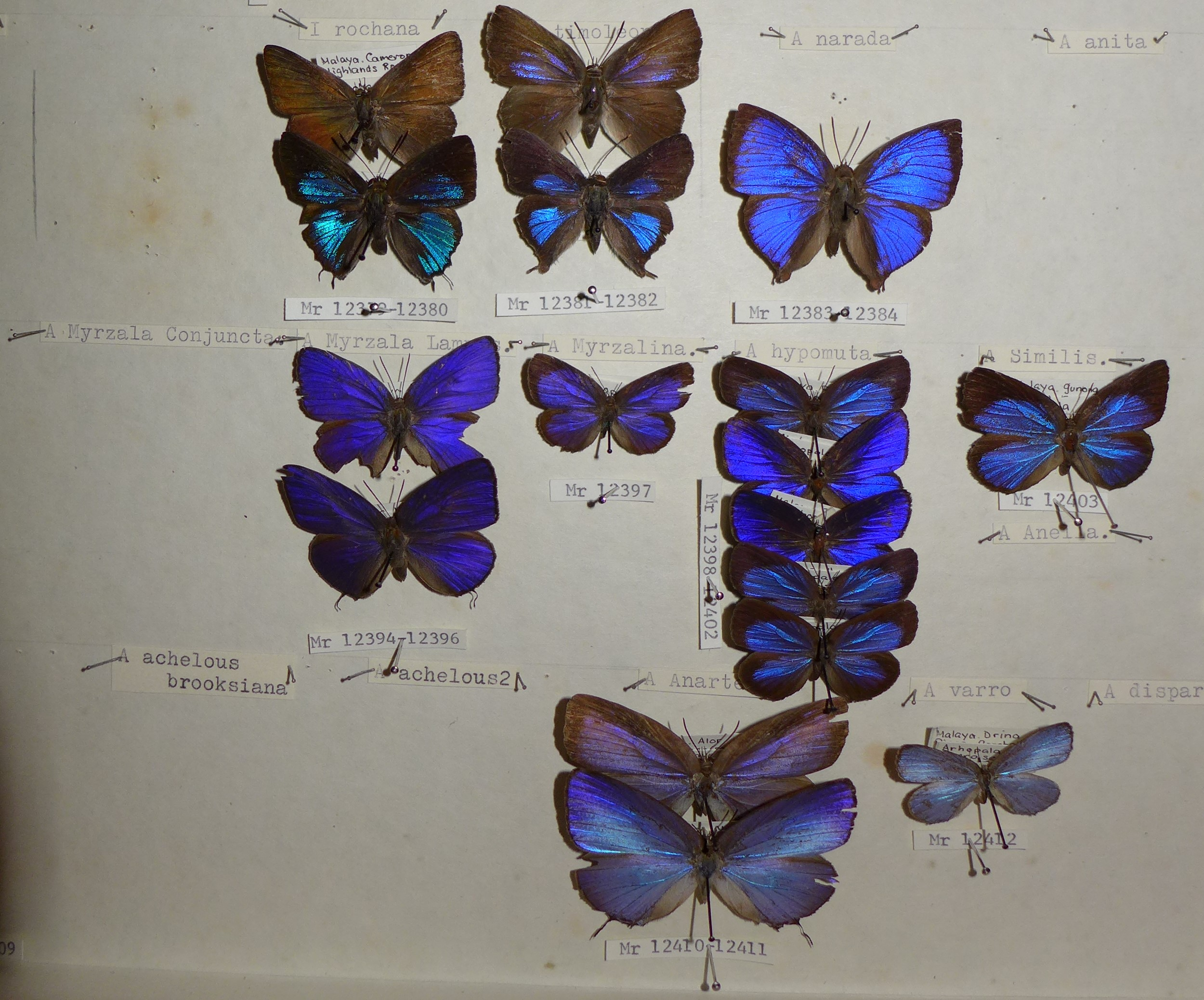
- subspecies selama (bottom right)

Scientific classification
- Kingdom: Animalia
- Phylum: Arthropoda
- Class: Insecta
- Order: Lepidoptera
- Family: Lycaenidae
- Subfamily: Theclinae
- Tribe: Arhopalini
- Genus: Arhopala
- Species: A. varro

Binomial name
- Arhopala varro Fruhstorfer, 1914

Synonyms
- Narathura varro

= Arhopala varro =

Upright-band oakblue

Species of butterfly

Arhopala varro, the upright-band oakblue, is a butterfly in the family Lycaenidae. It was discovered by Hans Fruhstorfer in 1914. It is found in South-east Asia excluding Indonesia and the Philippines.

== Description ==
The upperside is sky-blue (in selama) or bluish white (in varro). The black border on the upperside is 2 millimeters wide, broadening to 3 millimeters. Its tail is millimeters long. The underside is hair-brown, with the markings prominently outlined with white.

== Subspecies ==
Two subspecies are recognized-

- Arhopala varro varro (Evans, 1925) - Thailand, Laos and Cambodia
- Arhopala varro selama (Eliot, 1959) - Malaysia
