= Allotinus corbeti =

Scientific classification
- Domain: Eukaryota
- Kingdom: Animalia
- Phylum: Arthropoda
- Class: Insecta
- Order: Lepidoptera
- Family: Lycaenidae
- Genus: Allotinus
- Species: A. corbeti

Binomial name
- Allotinus corbeti Eliot, 1956

Synonyms
- Allotinus felderi corbeti Eliot; Eliot, 1967

Species of butterfly

Allotinus corbeti is a butterfly in the family Lycaenidae. It was described by John Nevill Eliot in 1956. It is found in Thailand, Laos, Peninsular Malaysia, Singapore and on Borneo, Sumatra and Mindanao.

It is named in honor of Dr. A. S. Corbet, to whom Eliot had sent the specimen before World War II, "in admiration of his researches on Malayan butterflies and in memory of his unfailing kindness and encouragement." Corbet had initially identified it as Allotinus dilutus (now Allotinus unicolor dilutus), presumably on the basis of its small size.
