= Allotinus nicholsi =

- in Seitz Macrolepidoptera Fauna IndoAustralica (g)

Scientific classification
- Kingdom: Animalia
- Phylum: Arthropoda
- Clade: Pancrustacea
- Class: Insecta
- Order: Lepidoptera
- Family: Lycaenidae
- Genus: Allotinus
- Species: A. nicholsi

Binomial name
- Allotinus nicholsi Moulton, [1912]

Synonyms
- Allotinus taras battakanus Fruhstorfer, 1913

Species of butterfly

Allotinus nicholsi is a butterfly in the family Lycaenidae. It was described by John Coney Moulton in 1912. It is found on Borneo and Sumatra.Hans Fruhstorfer in Seitz ( page 809 plate 141 ) provides a description differentiating nicholsi from nearby taxa.

== Subspecies ==
- Allotinus nicholsi nicholsi (Borneo: Sarawak)
- Allotinus nicholsi battakanus Fruhstorfer, 1913 (Sumatra: Battak Mountains)
