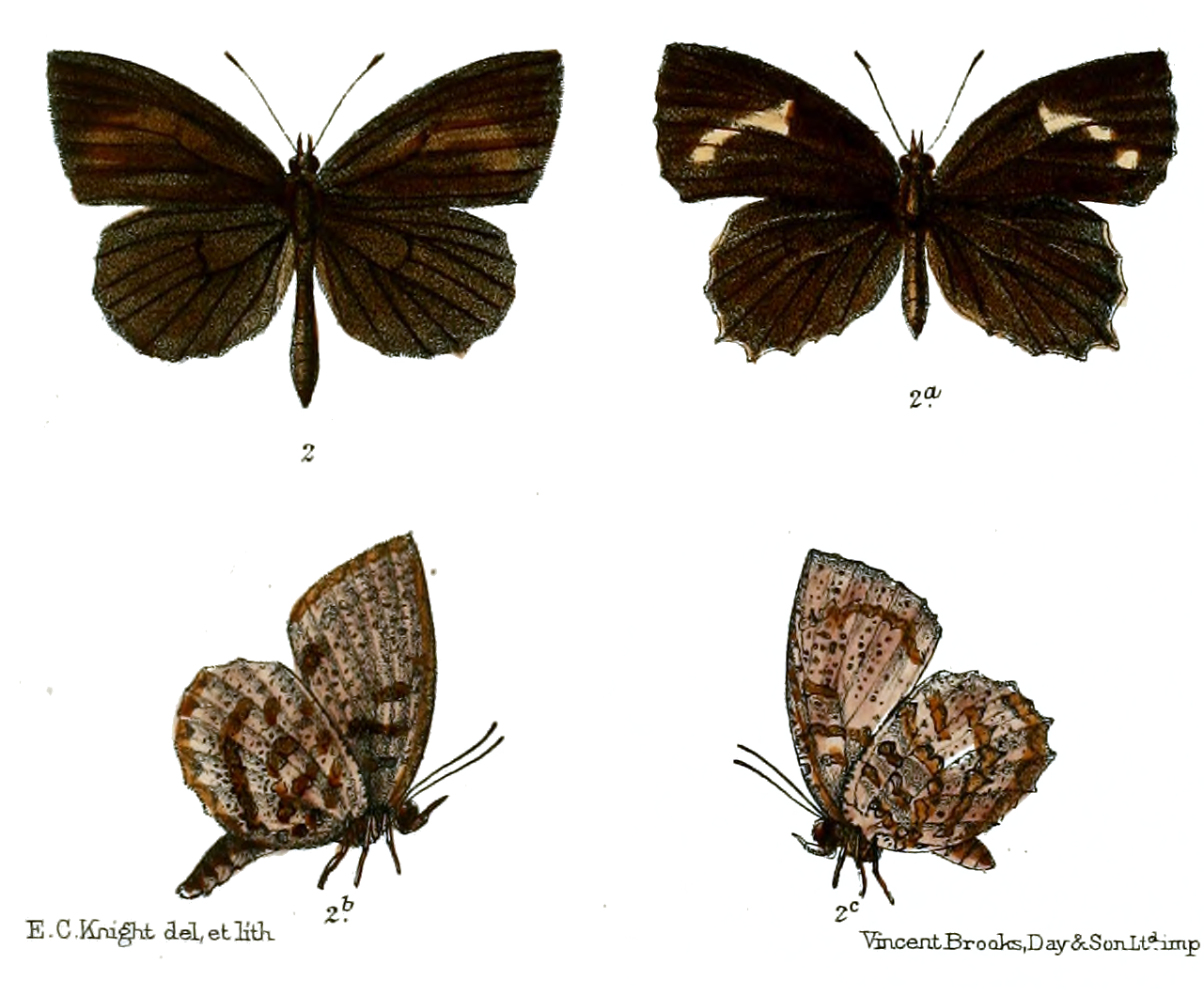

Scientific classification
- Domain: Eukaryota
- Kingdom: Animalia
- Phylum: Arthropoda
- Class: Insecta
- Order: Lepidoptera
- Family: Lycaenidae
- Genus: Allotinus
- Species: A. multistrigatus

Binomial name
- Allotinus multistrigatus de Nicéville, 1886

= Allotinus multistrigatus =

Great darkie

Species of butterfly

Allotinus multistrigatus, the great darkie, is a small butterfly found in India that belongs to the lycaenids or blues (family Lycaenidae). The species was first described by Lionel de Nicéville in 1886.

== Description ==
Male upperside: dark brown. Forewing: a broad, medial, pale curved patch. Hindwing: immaculate. Underside: paler, duller brown; markings on both forewings and hindwings a darker brown, nearly all very slenderly encircled or edged with dull white. Forewing: anterior half very closely, the lower disc more sparsely sprinkled with dark brown spots and specks that vary very much in size 5 cell with a basal, a medial and an apical short transverse dark brown band; a postdiscal similar but more irregular band made up of detached spots; the dorsal margin broadly paler and nearly free of the dark brown specks and spots; finally a terminal obscure series of dark brown lunules. Hindwing: minute dark brown specks and spots similar to those on the forewing, three basal detached spots in transverse row; a medial macular dark brown band that crosses the cell and is continued to the dorsum; a large dark brown spot at apex of cell with a similar spot above that touches the costa, and another below it at base of interspace 3; a broad, curved, macular, discal dark brown band, its uppermost spot well-detached, the others confluent; lastly the termen shaded with dark brown. Antenna, head, thorax and abdomen dark brown; beneath: the palpi, thorax and abdomen paler.

Female differs from the male as follows: Upperside, forewing: a conspicuous broad, very oblique medial band that consists of a large, white, somewhat irregularly-shaped spot beyond apex of cell and two spots placed obliquely outwards en echelon below it. Underside: the dark brown markings on the pale brown ground colour similar in shape and character but far more clearly defined and prominent, the slender white edgings to the minute spots and specks very conspicuous. Antennae, head, thorax and abdomen as in the male.

== Taxonomy ==
This species is considered in Markku Savela's site as conspecific with Allotinus drumila.

== See also ==
- List of butterflies of India
- List of butterflies of India (Lycaenidae)
