= Allotinus luzonensis =

Scientific classification
- Domain: Eukaryota
- Kingdom: Animalia
- Phylum: Arthropoda
- Class: Insecta
- Order: Lepidoptera
- Family: Lycaenidae
- Genus: Allotinus
- Species: A. luzonensis

Binomial name
- Allotinus luzonensis Eliot, 1967

Synonyms
- Allotinus macassariensis luzonensis Eliot, 1967

Species of butterfly

Allotinus luzonensis is a butterfly in the family Lycaenidae. It was described by John Nevill Eliot in 1967. It is found on Luzon in the Philippines.
