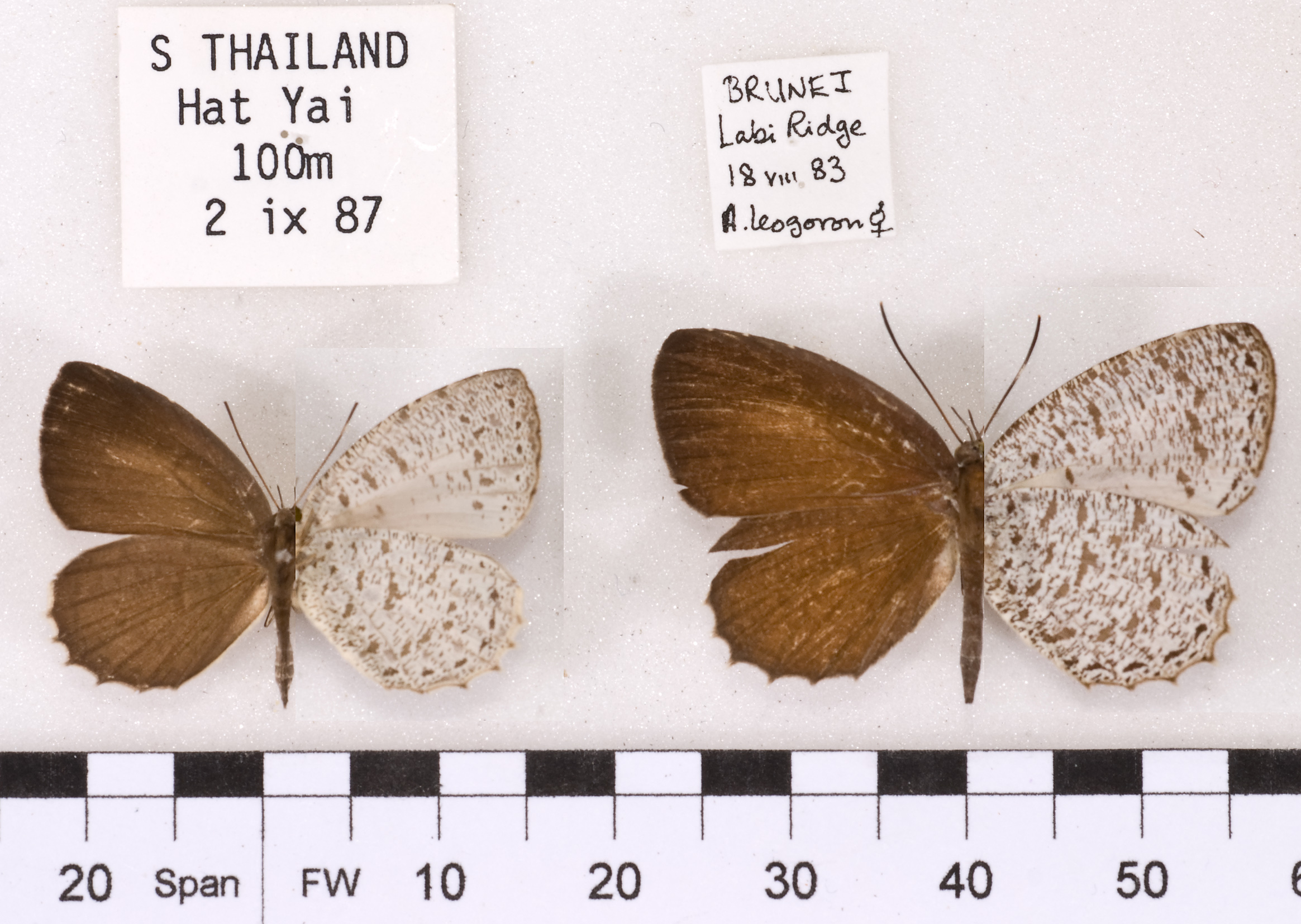

Scientific classification
- Domain: Eukaryota
- Kingdom: Animalia
- Phylum: Arthropoda
- Class: Insecta
- Order: Lepidoptera
- Family: Lycaenidae
- Genus: Allotinus
- Species: A. leogoron

Binomial name
- Allotinus leogoron Fruhstorfer, 1915

Synonyms
- Allotinus horsfieldi permagnus ♀-f. intricata Fruhstorfer, 1913; Allotinus leogoron Fruhstorfer, 1916; Allotinus continentalis vadosus Corbet, 1939; Allotinus leogoron leogoron Fruhstorfer; Corbet, 1939; Allotinus leogoron lindus Corbet, 1939

= Allotinus leogoron =

Species of butterfly

Allotinus leogoron is a butterfly in the family Lycaenidae. It was described by Hans Fruhstorfer in 1915. It is found in Asia.

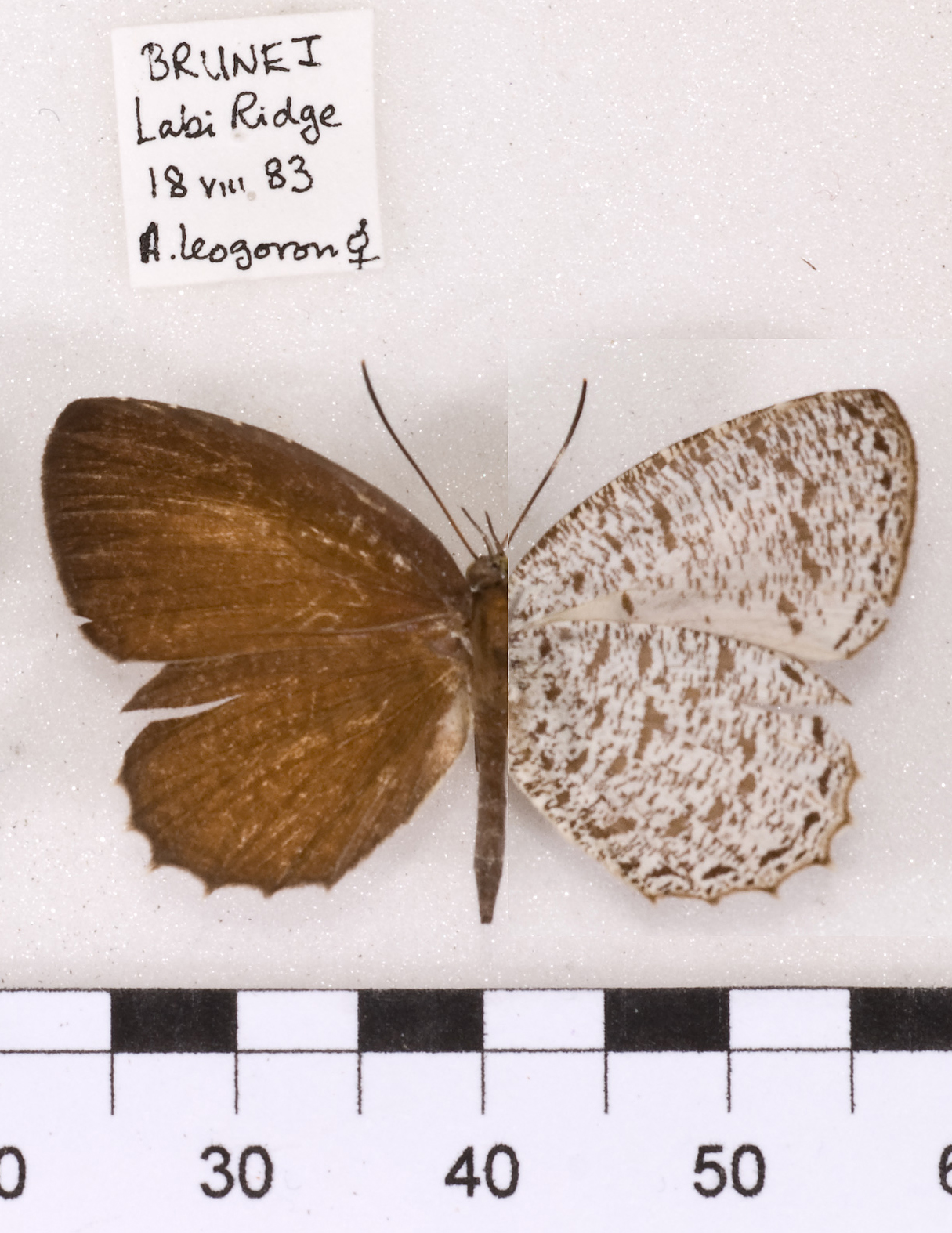
Allotinus leogoron normani

== Subspecies ==
- Allotinus leogoron leogoron (Malay Peninsula, Sumatra, Bangka, Thailand)
- Allotinus leogoron batuensis Eliot, 1967 (Batu Island)
- Allotinus leogoron normani Eliot, 1967 (Borneo)
- Allotinus leogoron plessis Eliot, 1967 (Java)
