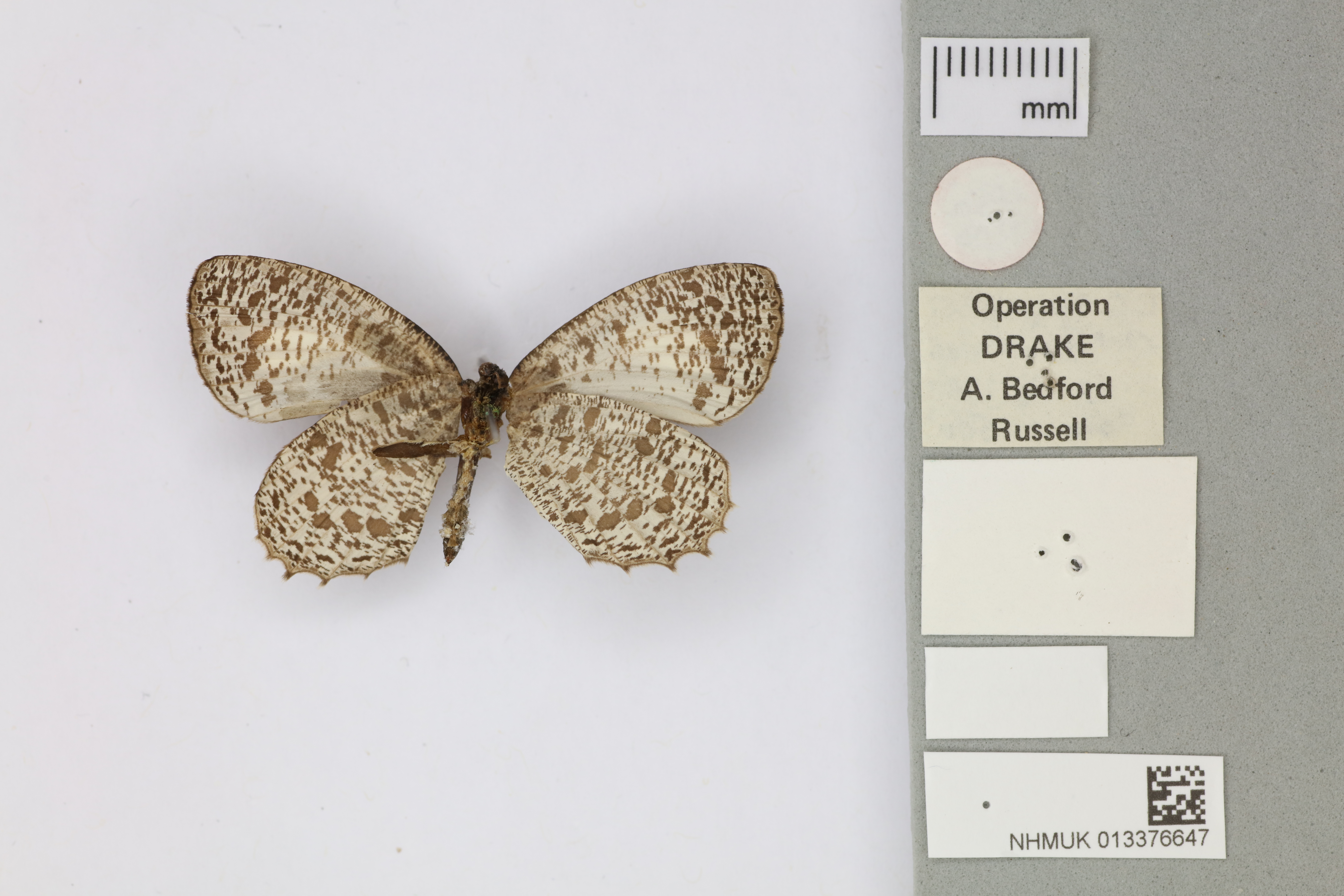

Scientific classification
- Domain: Eukaryota
- Kingdom: Animalia
- Phylum: Arthropoda
- Class: Insecta
- Order: Lepidoptera
- Family: Lycaenidae
- Genus: Allotinus
- Species: A. samarensis

Binomial name
- Allotinus samarensis Eliot, 1986

= Allotinus samarensis =

Species of butterfly

Allotinus samarensis is a butterfly in the family Lycaenidae. It was described by John Nevill Eliot in 1986. It is found in the Philippines.

== Subspecies ==
- Allotinus samarensis samarensis (Philippines: Samar)
- Allotinus samarensis russelli J. Eliot, 1986 (Sulawesi)
