= Allotinus apries =

Scientific classification
- Kingdom: Animalia
- Phylum: Arthropoda
- Class: Insecta
- Order: Lepidoptera
- Family: Lycaenidae
- Genus: Allotinus
- Species: A. apries

Binomial name
- Allotinus apries Fruhstorfer, 1913

Synonyms
- Allotinus horsfieldi apries Fruhstorfer, 1913; Allotinus apries eupalion Fruhstorfer; Corbet, 1939; Allotinus strigatus dositheus Fruhstorfer, 1914; Allotinus apries dosithesu Fruhstorfer; Corbet, 1939

Species of butterfly

Allotinus apries is a butterfly in the family Lycaenidae. It was described by Hans Fruhstorfer in 1913. It is found in Asia.

Young larvae feed on coccids. Later, they live in the nest of Myrmicaria lutea ants. apriesfrom the island of Borneo is in its size somewhat inferior to permagnus from Sumatra. Under surface of a peculiar bluish white, the male of a very delicate brown, the females more densely speckled with greyish-brown. Of the female there are before me the two forms being analogous to intricata' Fruhst. and infumata Fruhst. and differing slightly in the colouring, and there exist examples in which, like in A. unicolor Fldr., the grey, submarginal macular series of the under surface of the forewing is increased. It is not unlikely that among the abnormal forms there are some more species hidden that have hitherto not been recognized and resemble A. horsfieldi.

== Subspecies ==
- Allotinus apries apries (Borneo, Pulo Laut, Malay Peninsula, Sumatra)
- Allotinus apries dositheus Fruhstorfer, 1914 (Java)
- Allotinus apries ristus Eliot, 1986 (Philippines: Palawan)
