= Allotinus parapus =

- in Seitz Macrolepidoptera IndoAustralica Fauna (h)

Scientific classification
- Kingdom: Animalia
- Phylum: Arthropoda
- Clade: Pancrustacea
- Class: Insecta
- Order: Lepidoptera
- Family: Lycaenidae
- Genus: Allotinus
- Species: A. parapus

Binomial name
- Allotinus parapus Fruhstorfer, 1913

Species of butterfly

Allotinus parapus is a butterfly in the family Lycaenidae. It was described by Hans Fruhstorfer in 1913. It is found on Mount Kinabalu in Borneo.Fruhstorfer in Seitz ( page 809 plate 141 h) provides a description differentiating parapus from nearby taxa.
