= Allotinus davidis =

Scientific classification
- Domain: Eukaryota
- Kingdom: Animalia
- Phylum: Arthropoda
- Class: Insecta
- Order: Lepidoptera
- Family: Lycaenidae
- Genus: Allotinus
- Species: A. davidis

Binomial name
- Allotinus davidis Eliot, 1959

Species of butterfly

Allotinus davidis is a butterfly in the family Lycaenidae. It was described by John Nevill Eliot in 1959. It is found in Thailand, Peninsular Malaysia, Singapore and on Sumatra and possibly Borneo.
