= Allotinus agnolia =

Scientific classification
- Domain: Eukaryota
- Kingdom: Animalia
- Phylum: Arthropoda
- Class: Insecta
- Order: Lepidoptera
- Family: Lycaenidae
- Genus: Allotinus
- Species: A. agnolia

Binomial name
- Allotinus agnolia Eliot, 1986

Species of butterfly

Allotinus agnolia is a butterfly in the family Lycaenidae. It was described by John Nevill Eliot in 1986. It is found on Sumatra.
