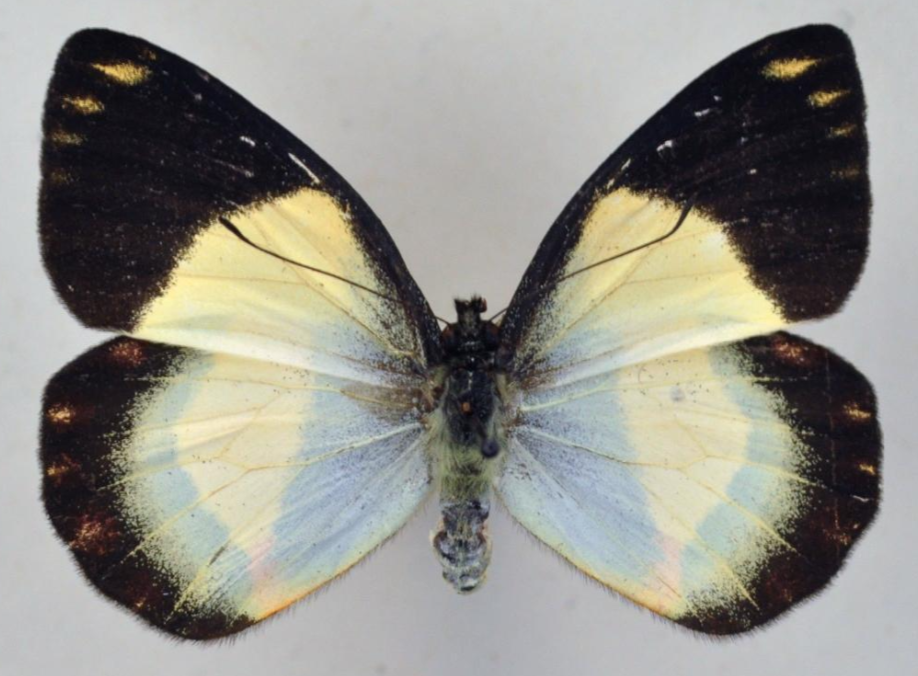

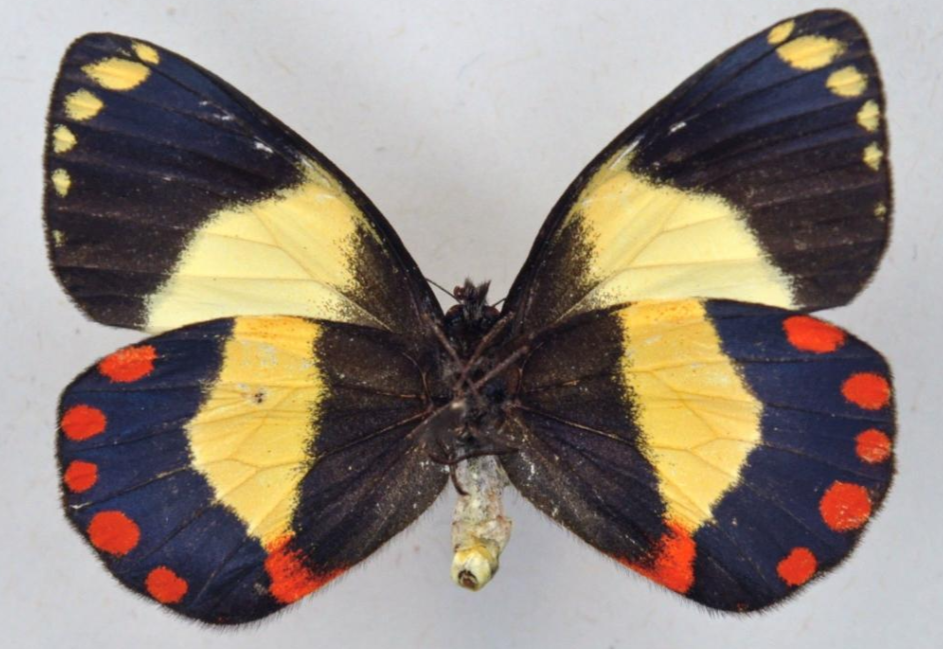

Scientific classification
- Kingdom: Animalia
- Phylum: Arthropoda
- Class: Insecta
- Order: Lepidoptera
- Family: Pieridae
- Genus: Delias
- Species: D. sagessa

Binomial name
- Delias sagessa Fruhstorfer, 1910

Synonyms
- Delias dives Rothschild, 1904

= Delias sagessa =

Species of butterfly

Delias sagessa is a butterfly in the family Pieridae. It was described by Hans Fruhstorfer in 1910. It is found in New Guinea.

The wingspan is about 38–42 mm. Males are white, with the forewings black from the apex of the cell distad, the costal edge black down to the base, a white area rounded distally, extending close to the apex of SM2. The hindwings have a very thin black distal border. Females are similar to the males, but the black apical area of the forewings is wider, and the hindwings have a broad black distal border, which slightly widens costally. There are often white submarginal dots on both wings, those of the hindwings slightly pinkish. The white area is feebly yellowish.

== Subspecies ==
- D. s. sagessa (southern Papua New Guinea)
- D. s. straatmani Schröder, 1977 (central Papua New Guinea)
