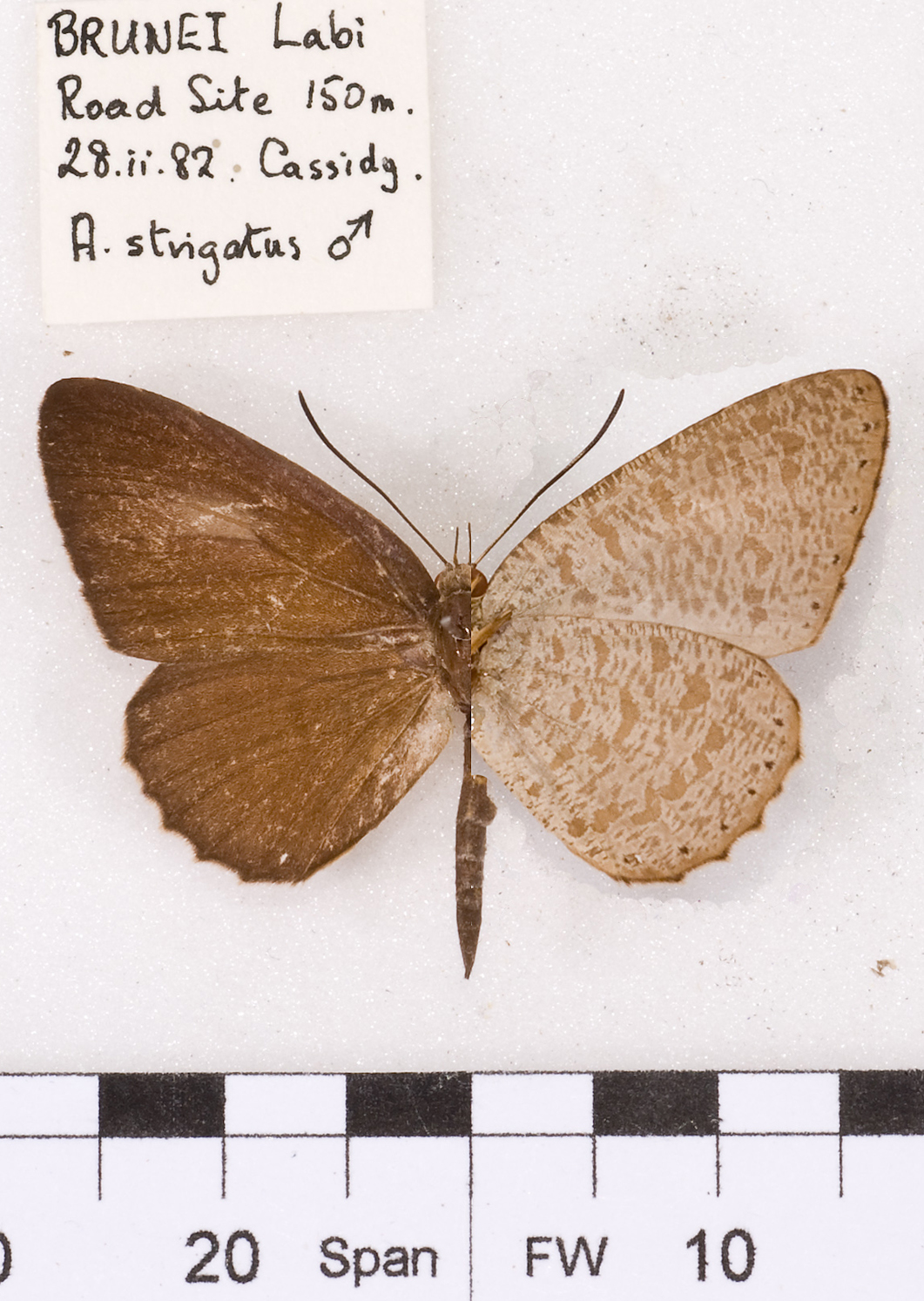

Scientific classification
- Domain: Eukaryota
- Kingdom: Animalia
- Phylum: Arthropoda
- Class: Insecta
- Order: Lepidoptera
- Family: Lycaenidae
- Genus: Allotinus
- Species: A. strigatus

Binomial name
- Allotinus strigatus Moulton, 1911

Synonyms
- Allotinus strigatus denalus Corbet, 1939

= Allotinus strigatus =

Species of butterfly

Allotinus strigatus is a butterfly in the family Lycaenidae. It was described by John Coney Moulton in 1911. It is found in Southeast Asia.

== Subspecies ==
- Allotinus strigatus strigatus (Borneo, Pulo Laut)
- Allotinus strigatus malayanus Corbet, 1939 (Thailand, Langkawi, Malay Peninsula, Tioman, Singapore)
