= Allotinus borneensis =

Scientific classification
- Domain: Eukaryota
- Kingdom: Animalia
- Phylum: Arthropoda
- Class: Insecta
- Order: Lepidoptera
- Family: Lycaenidae
- Genus: Allotinus
- Species: A. borneensis

Binomial name
- Allotinus borneensis Moulton, 1911

Synonyms
- Allotinus borneensis elioti Corbet, 1939

Species of butterfly

Allotinus borneensis is a butterfly in the family Lycaenidae. It was described by John Coney Moulton in 1911. It is found on Borneo, Peninsular Malaysia, Sumatra and Bangka.
