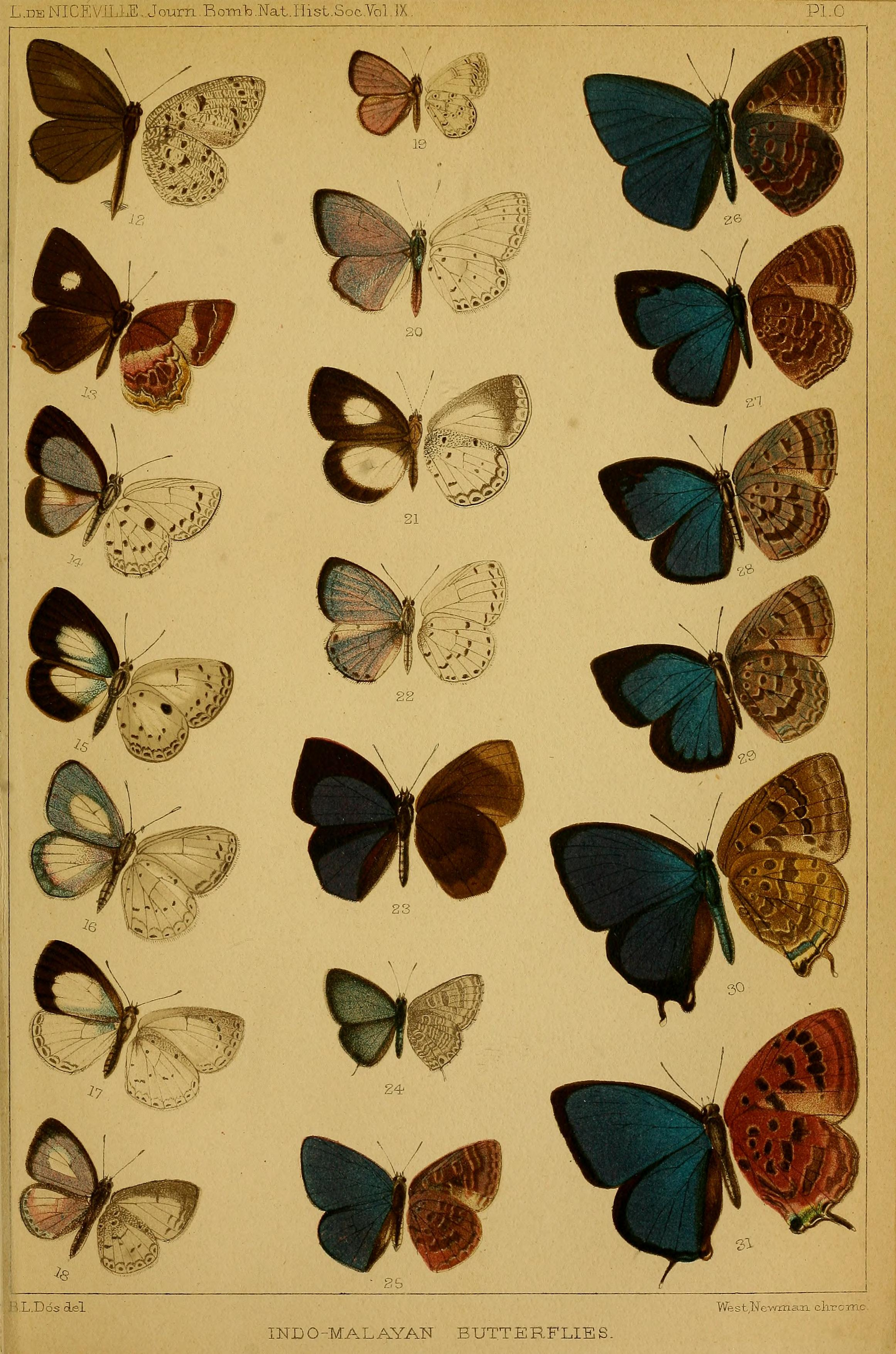
- Allotinus paetus figure 12

Scientific classification
- Domain: Eukaryota
- Kingdom: Animalia
- Phylum: Arthropoda
- Class: Insecta
- Order: Lepidoptera
- Family: Lycaenidae
- Genus: Allotinus
- Species: A. paetus

Binomial name
- Allotinus paetus (de Nicéville, 1895)

Synonyms
- Paragerydus paetus de Nicéville, 1895; Allotinus paetus paetus (de Nicéville) Fruhstorfer, 1913

= Allotinus paetus =

Species of butterfly

Allotinus paetus is a butterfly in the family Lycaenidae. It was described by Lionel de Nicéville in 1895. It is found on Sumatra.Hans Fruhstorfer in Seitz ( page 811 plate 141 i ) provides a description differentiating paetus from nearby taxa.
