= Allotinus albifasciatus =

Scientific classification
- Domain: Eukaryota
- Kingdom: Animalia
- Phylum: Arthropoda
- Class: Insecta
- Order: Lepidoptera
- Family: Lycaenidae
- Genus: Allotinus
- Species: A. albifasciatus

Binomial name
- Allotinus albifasciatus Eliot, 1980

Species of butterfly

Allotinus albifasciatus is a butterfly in the family Lycaenidae. It was described by John Nevill Eliot in 1980. It is found on Sumatra and Peninsular Malaysia.
