= Allotinus thalebanus =

Scientific classification
- Domain: Eukaryota
- Kingdom: Animalia
- Phylum: Arthropoda
- Class: Insecta
- Order: Lepidoptera
- Family: Lycaenidae
- Genus: Allotinus
- Species: A. thalebanus

Binomial name
- Allotinus thalebanus Murayama & Kimura, 1990

Species of butterfly

Allotinus thalebanus is a butterfly in the family Lycaenidae. It was described by Murayama and Kimura in 1990. It is found in Thailand.
