= Allotinus melos =

Scientific classification
- Domain: Eukaryota
- Kingdom: Animalia
- Phylum: Arthropoda
- Class: Insecta
- Order: Lepidoptera
- Family: Lycaenidae
- Genus: Allotinus
- Species: A. melos

Binomial name
- Allotinus melos (H. H. Druce, 1896)

Synonyms
- Paragerydus melos H. H. Druce, 1896; Allotinus melos (H. H. Druce) Fruhstorfer, 1913; Allotinus horsfieldi leos (H. H. Druce); Fruhstorfer, 1916; Allotinus horsfieldi reverdini Fruhstorfer, 1916; Allotinus macassariensis melos (H. H. Druce); Eliot, 1967; Allotinus macassariensis reverdini Fruhstorfer; Eliot, 1967; Allotinus macassariensis talu Eliot, 1967

Species of butterfly

Allotinus melos is a butterfly in the family Lycaenidae. It was described by Hamilton Herbert Druce in 1896. It is found on the Philippines (Mindanao and Palawan), Balabac Island and Borneo.
