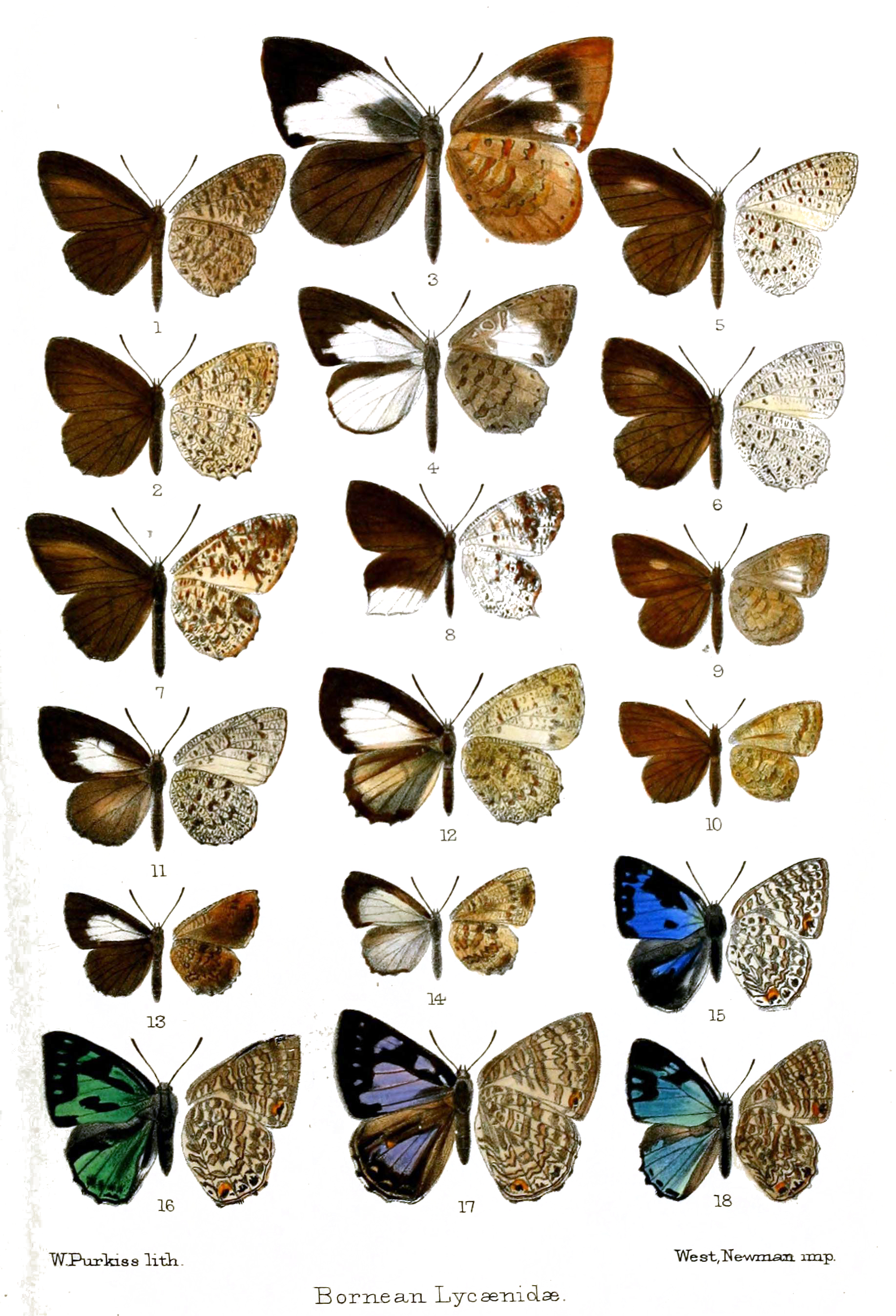
- Allotinus portunus figure 1

Scientific classification
- Domain: Eukaryota
- Kingdom: Animalia
- Phylum: Arthropoda
- Class: Insecta
- Order: Lepidoptera
- Family: Lycaenidae
- Genus: Allotinus
- Species: A. portunus

Binomial name
- Allotinus portunus (de Nicéville, 1894)

Synonyms
- Paragerydus portunus de Nicéville, 1894; Allotinus panormis fruhstorferi Corbet, 1939; Allotinus panormis maitus; Allotinus taras narsares Fruhstorfer, 1913; Allotinus panormis portunus (de Nicéville); Corbet, 1939; Paragerydus pyxus de Nicéville, 1894; Paragerydus waterstradti H. H. Druce, 1895; Paragerydus waterstradti ab. absens H. H. Druce, 1895

= Allotinus portunus =

Species of butterfly

Allotinus portunus is a butterfly in the family Lycaenidae. It was described by Lionel de Nicéville in 1894. It is found in Southeast Asia.

== Subspecies ==
- Allotinus portunus portunus (Java)
- Allotinus portunus maitus Fruhstorfer, 1914 (Sumatra, western Malaysia)
- Allotinus portunus pyxus (de Nicéville, 1894) (Borneo: Mount Kina Balu)
