= Allotinus substrigosus =

Scientific classification
- Kingdom: Animalia
- Phylum: Arthropoda
- Class: Insecta
- Order: Lepidoptera
- Family: Lycaenidae
- Genus: Allotinus
- Species: A. substrigosus

Binomial name
- Allotinus substrigosus (Moore, 1884)

Synonyms
- Logania substrigosa Moore, 1884; Allotinus nivalis lenaia Fruhstorfer, 1913; Allotinus substrigosa Fruhstorfer; Eliot, 1967; Allotinus nivalis sibyllina Riley, 1944; Allotinus nivalis magaris Fruhstorfer, 1913; Allotinus nivalis substrigosa; Allotinus substrigosa substrigosa

Species of butterfly

Allotinus substrigosus is a butterfly in the family Lycaenidae. It was described by Frederic Moore in 1884. It is found in Asia. The under surface is faded and the brown splashes are somewhat distinct.

== Subspecies ==
- Allotinus substrigosus substrigosus (Sumatra)
- Allotinus substrigosus ballantinei Eliot, 1986 (Philippines: Palawan)
- Allotinus substrigosus lenaia Fruhstorfer, 1913 (Nias)
- Allotinus substrigosus sibyllinus Riley, 1944 (Mentawai)
- Allotinus substrigosus yusukei Eliot, 1986 (Philippines: Mindanao)
