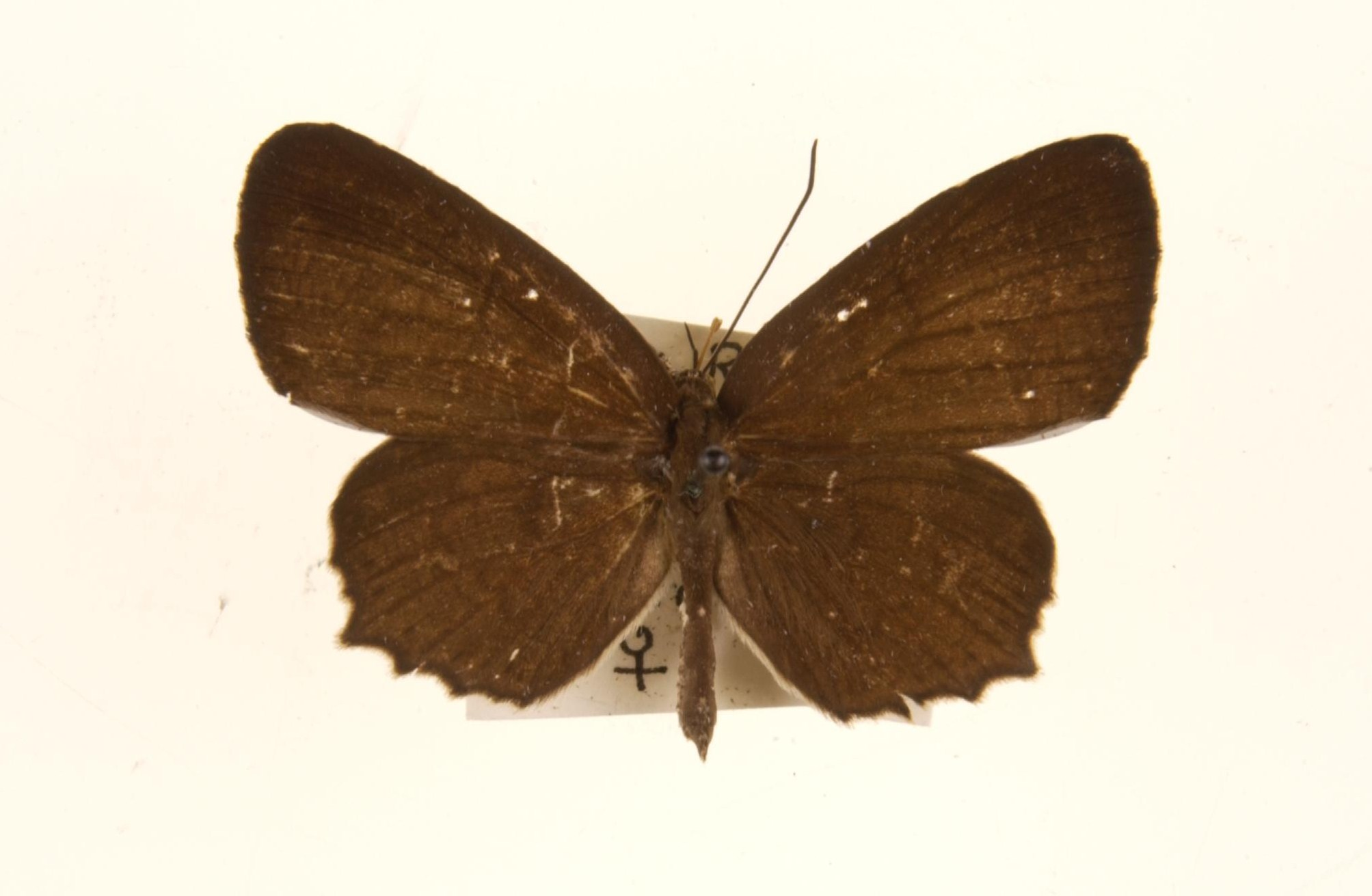
- Museum specimen from Malaya

Scientific classification
- Domain: Eukaryota
- Kingdom: Animalia
- Phylum: Arthropoda
- Class: Insecta
- Order: Lepidoptera
- Family: Lycaenidae
- Genus: Allotinus
- Species: A. fabius

Binomial name
- Allotinus fabius (Distant & Pryer, 1887)

= Allotinus fabius =

Angled darkie

Species of butterfly

Allotinus fabius, the angled darkie, is a small butterfly found in India, Myanmar and South East Asia that belongs to the lycaenids or blues family.

== Range ==
Naga Hills, Myanmar, Borneo and Philippines. Nagas to Karens. Malaya

== Status ==
Very rare.

== See also ==
- List of butterflies of India
- List of butterflies of India (Lycaenidae)
