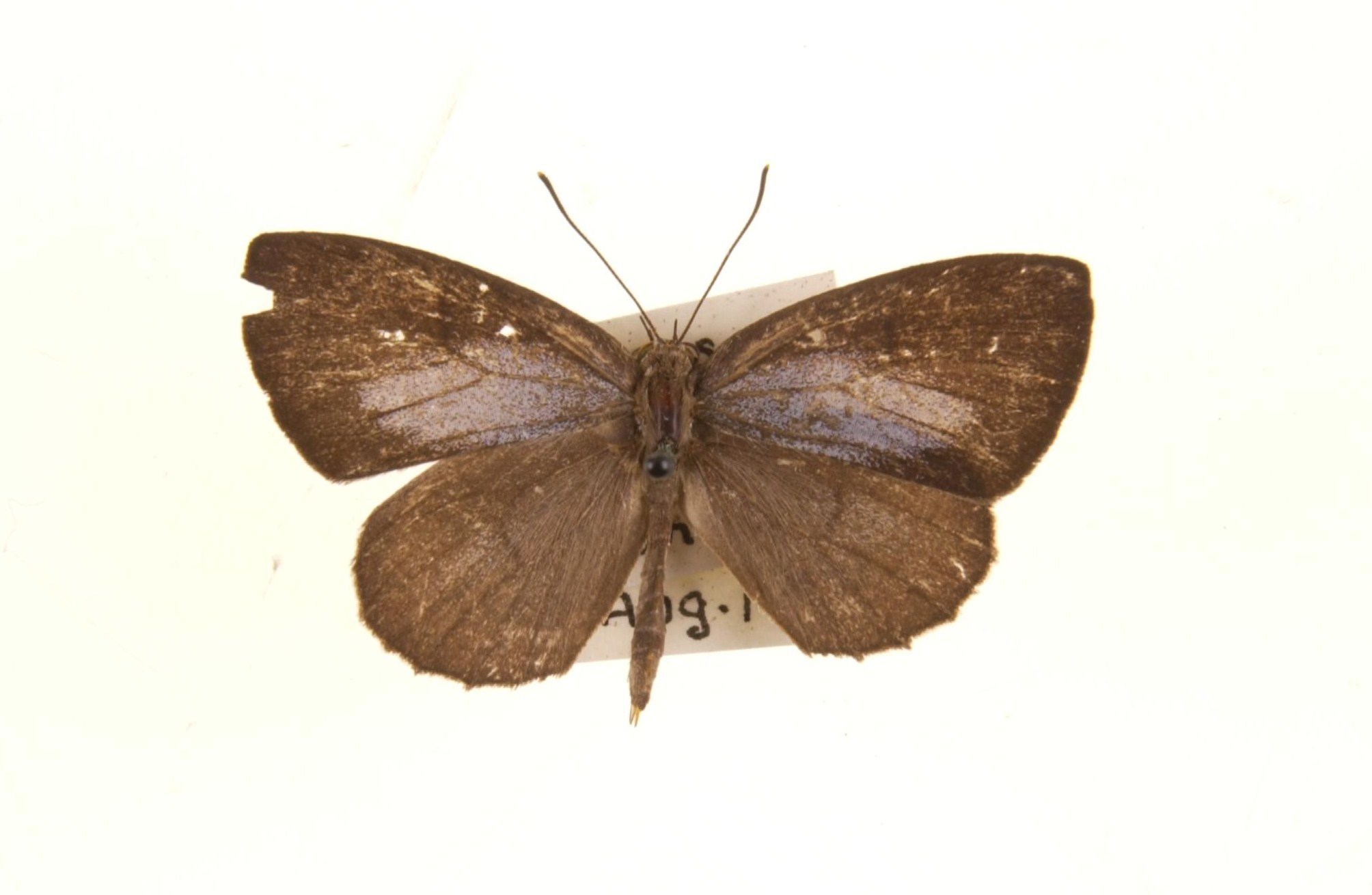
- Museum specimen from Malaya

Scientific classification
- Domain: Eukaryota
- Kingdom: Animalia
- Phylum: Arthropoda
- Class: Insecta
- Order: Lepidoptera
- Family: Lycaenidae
- Genus: Allotinus
- Species: A. subviolaceus

Binomial name
- Allotinus subviolaceus C. Felder & R. Felder, 1865

= Allotinus subviolaceus =

Blue darkie

Species of butterfly

Allotinus subviolaceus, the blue darkie, is a small butterfly found in South East Asia that belongs to the lycaenids or blues family. The species was first described by Cajetan Felder and Rudolf Felder in 1865.

== Range ==
This species resides in Manipur, Myanmar and Borneo.

== Description ==
Male upperside: brownish black. Forewing: a medial area from base broadening outwards and extended to a little past the apex of cell, violaceous (violet coloured). This pale area varies very much in width and extent. In typical specimens from Java it is most restricted, but in those from the Malay Peninsula and Tenasserim (alkamah, Distant) it occupies a much larger extent of the wing. Hindwing: a broad medial longitudinal violaceous streak not extended to the termen. Underside: pale brownish white with darker specks, spots and transverse stria. These markings on both forewings and hindwings tend to coalesce and form broken transverse bands, the detached portions of each band placed more or less en echelon one with the other. Antennae, head, thorax and abdomen pale brown; beneath: the palpi almost white, the thorax and abdomen paler than on the upperside.

Female upperside: similar to that of the male, but the violaceous area on both forewings and hindwings of much greater extent. Underside: also similar to that of the male, but the ground colour brighter with a tinge of yellow; the markings more ochraceous than brown, more conspicuous and prominent. Antenna, head, thorax and abdomen as in the male but paler.

== See also ==
- List of butterflies of India
- List of butterflies of India (Lycaenidae)
