= Allotinus nigritus =

Scientific classification
- Kingdom: Animalia
- Phylum: Arthropoda
- Class: Insecta
- Order: Lepidoptera
- Family: Lycaenidae
- Genus: Allotinus
- Species: A. nigritus

Binomial name
- Allotinus nigritus (Semper, 1889)

Synonyms
- Paragerydus nigritus Semper, 1889; Allotinus punctatus (Semper) ♀-f. eretria Fruhstorfer, 1916

Species of butterfly

Allotinus nigritus is a butterfly in the family Lycaenidae. It was described by Georg Semper in 1889. It is found on Mindanao in the Philippines. apparently replaces A. portunus in the Philippines, but it is at once distinguishable from A. pyxus and A. strigatus by the absence of the androconium of the forewing. The under surface is characterized by a black dot in the middle of the costal margin of the forewing. On the other hand the black anteterminal dots on both wings being so characteristic of A. portunus are absent. Very rare, so far only 2 males known from East Mindanao (June to August) and 1 female from South East Mindanao.
