= Allotinus punctatus =

Scientific classification
- Kingdom: Animalia
- Phylum: Arthropoda
- Class: Insecta
- Order: Lepidoptera
- Family: Lycaenidae
- Genus: Allotinus
- Species: A. punctatus

Binomial name
- Allotinus punctatus (Semper, 1889)

Synonyms
- Paragerydus punctatus Semper, 1889; Allotinus anaxandridas Fruhstorfer, 1916; Allotinus caesemius Fruhstorfer, 1916

Species of butterfly

Allotinus punctatus is a butterfly in the family Lycaenidae. It was described by Georg Semper in 1889. It is found on Mindanao in the Philippines.A magnificent species which replaces A. fabius in the Philippines.Female with tails, though not so prominent as in A. fabius from Macromalayana. male and female above unicolorously brown, female with a somewhat fainter discal spot of the forewing. Under surface with the anteterminal series of black dots being so characteristic of A. nigritus and A. fabius. Then the costal dot of the hindwing, reminding us of A. nigritus. In the female the brown markings beneath are very narrow, so that the whitish ground-colour is everywhere predominantly exhibited. East Mindanao to the south of the eighth degree of latitude. Flying from July to December. Beside unicolorously brown females there exist also such with a light yellow anal border of the upper surface of the hindwings.
