= Bluebelly Java snake =

Conservation status
- Vulnerable (IUCN 3.1)

Scientific classification
- Kingdom: Animalia
- Phylum: Chordata
- Class: Reptilia
- Order: Squamata
- Suborder: Serpentes
- Family: Colubridae
- Genus: Tetralepis; Boettger, 1892
- Species: T. fruhstorferi

Binomial name
- Tetralepis fruhstorferi Boettger, 1892

Species of snake

The bluebelly Java snake (Tetralepis fruhstorferi), also known commonly as Fruhstorfer's mountain snake and the Javan bluebelly snake, is a species of snake in the family Colubridae. The species, which is the only member of the genus Tetralepis, is endemic to Java.

== Etymology ==
The specific name, fruhstorferi, is in honor of German lepidopterist Hans Fruhstorfer, who collected the holotype.

== Habitat ==
The preferred natural habitat of T. fruhstorferi is forest, at altitudes of about 1,000 m (3,300 ft).

== Description ==
Dorsally, T. fruhstorferi is dark reddish brown, with an indistinct darker vertebral line. Ventrally, it is lead-colored or reddish gray. The holotype has a snout-to-vent length (SVL) of 43.2 cm (17.0 in), plus a tail length of 7.0 cm (2.8 in).

== Behavior ==
T. fruhstorferi is terrestrial, semi-fossorial, and nocturnal or crepuscular.

== Reproduction ==
The mode of reproduction of T. fruhstorferi is unknown.
