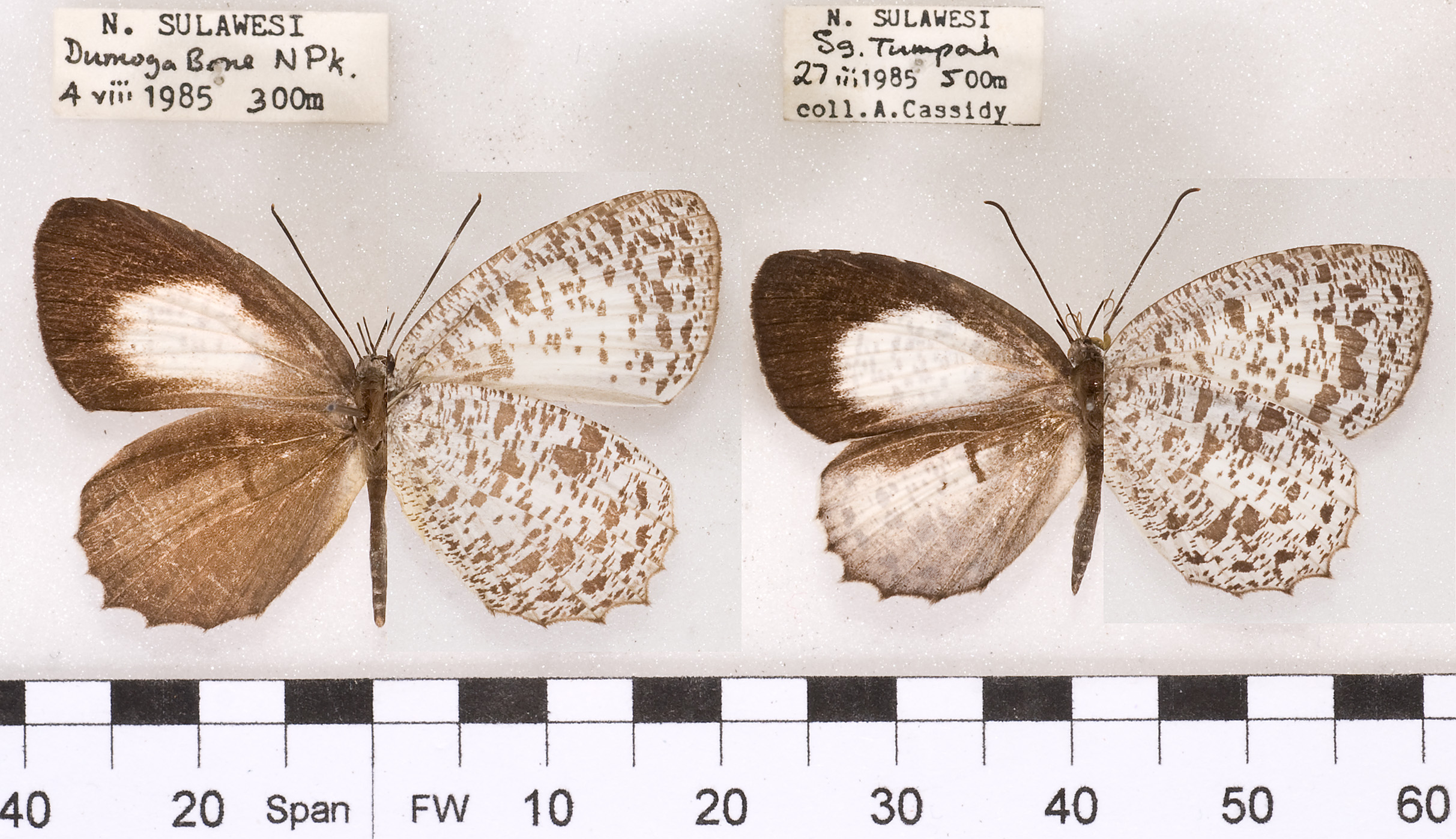

Scientific classification
- Domain: Eukaryota
- Kingdom: Animalia
- Phylum: Arthropoda
- Class: Insecta
- Order: Lepidoptera
- Family: Lycaenidae
- Genus: Allotinus
- Species: A. albatus

Binomial name
- Allotinus albatus C. & R. Felder, [1865]

= Allotinus albatus =

Species of butterfly

Allotinus albatus is a butterfly in the family Lycaenidae. It was described by father and son entomologists Cajetan and Rudolf Felder in 1865. It is found on Sulawesi and the Philippines (Luzon).

== Subspecies ==
- Alotinus albatus albatus (Sulawesi)
- Allotinus albatus mendax Eliot, 1986 (Philippines: Luzon)
