= Allotinus kudaratus =

Scientific classification
- Domain: Eukaryota
- Kingdom: Animalia
- Phylum: Arthropoda
- Class: Insecta
- Order: Lepidoptera
- Family: Lycaenidae
- Genus: Allotinus
- Species: A. kudaratus

Binomial name
- Allotinus kudaratus Takanami, 1990

Species of butterfly

Allotinus kudaratus is a butterfly in the family Lycaenidae. It was described by Takanami in 1990. It is found on the Philippines (Mindanao).
