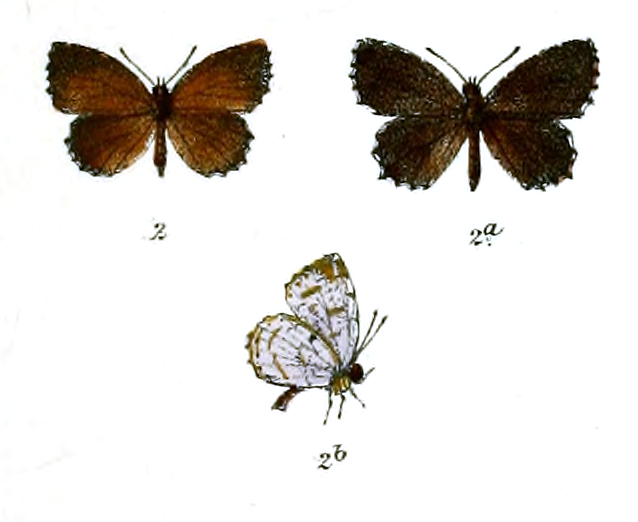

Scientific classification
- Domain: Eukaryota
- Kingdom: Animalia
- Phylum: Arthropoda
- Class: Insecta
- Order: Lepidoptera
- Family: Lycaenidae
- Genus: Allotinus
- Species: A. nivalis

Binomial name
- Allotinus nivalis (H. Druce, 1873)

Synonyms
- Miletus nivalis H. Druce, 1873; Allotinus felderi Semper, 1889; Allotinus felderi felderi Semper; Eliot, 1967

= Allotinus nivalis =

Species of butterfly

Allotinus nivalis is a butterfly in the family Lycaenidae. It was described by Herbert Druce in 1873. It is found in Southeast Asia.

== Subspecies ==
- Allotinus nivalis nivalis (Borneo, Pulo Laut)
- Allotinus nivalis felderi Semper, 1889 (Philippines)
