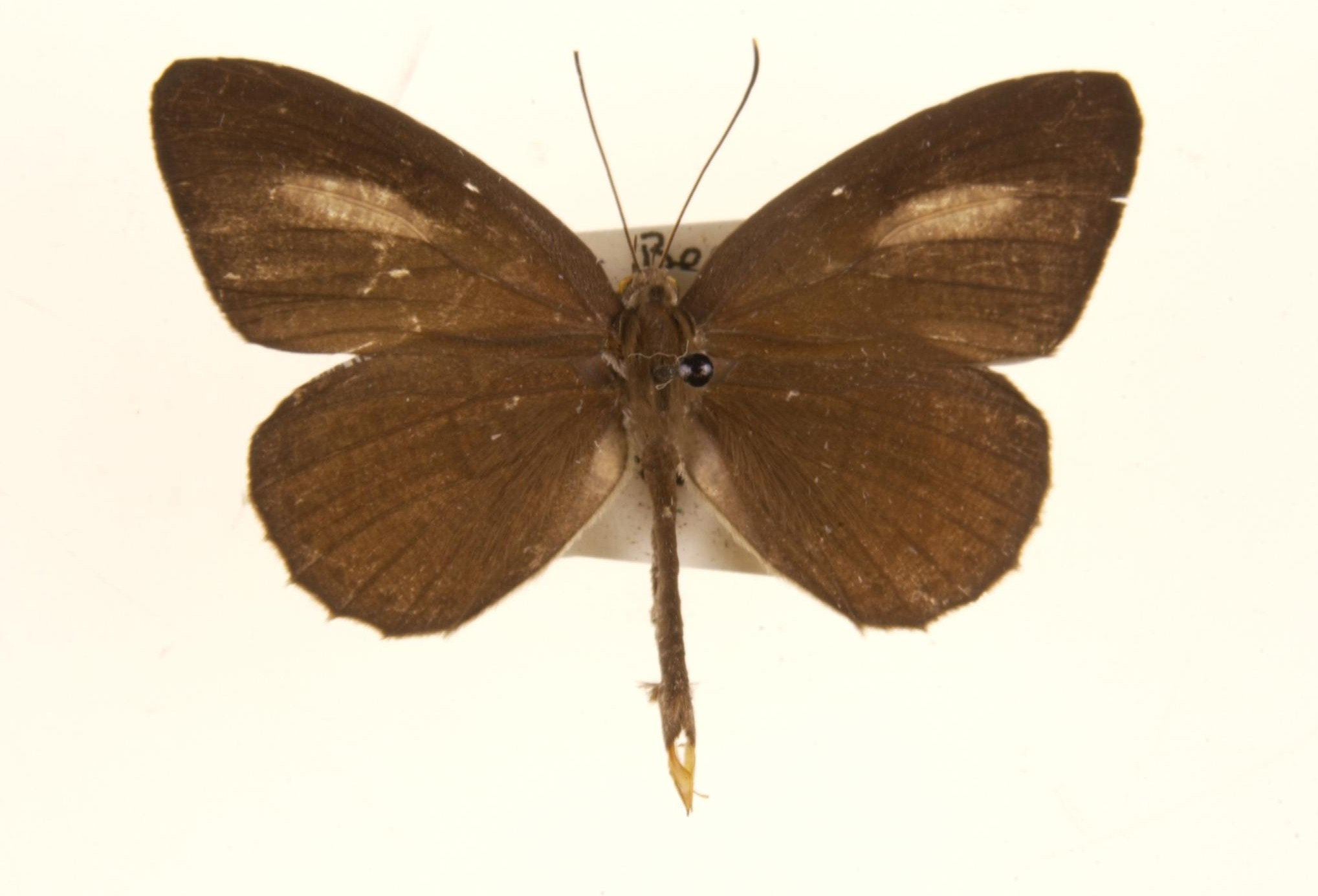
- Male specimen from Malaya

Scientific classification
- Domain: Eukaryota
- Kingdom: Animalia
- Phylum: Arthropoda
- Class: Insecta
- Order: Lepidoptera
- Family: Lycaenidae
- Genus: Allotinus
- Species: A. horsfieldi

Binomial name
- Allotinus horsfieldi (Moore, 1857)

Synonyms
- Miletus horsfieldi Moore, 1857; Allotinus horsfieldii (Moore); Piepers & Snellen, 1918; Paragerydus horsfieldi (Moore); Distant, 1884; Allotinus horsfieldi permagnus Fruhstorfer, 1913; Allotinus horsfieldi nessus Corbet, 1939

= Allotinus horsfieldi =

Common darkie

Species of butterfly

Allotinus horsfieldi, the common darkie, is a small butterfly found in India that belongs to the lycaenids or blues family.

== Range ==
It is found in Assam in India to Myanmar. Also Chittagong Hill Tracts. As per Savela the butterfly occurs from Thailand, Langkawi, Malay Peninsula, Tioman, Singapore, Borneo, Sumatra, Bangka, Batu, Celebes and Sundaland.

== Description ==
A small butterfly, 38–44 mm in wingspan. The upper forewing in both sexes has a pale elongated oval discal patch. This may be larger and more diffuse in females. The butterflies are speckled below.

=== Museum diagnosis ===
Male upperside: brown. Forewing: an elongate oval pale patch beyond apex of cell. Hindwing: uniform, immaculate. Underside: dull white. Both forewings and hindwings with numerous short, slender, transverse strigae and minute dots, brown. Forewing: dorsal area near base below the cell but not further outwards more or less free of spots and strigae; a narrow brown transverse spot across cell near the base, another across the middle, and a third of the apex of the same; a postdiscal, sinuate, irregular, macular, transverse, broad brownish line followed by a subterminal series of similarly-coloured minute spots. Hindwing: two or three very broken similar transverse broad curved lines, sometimes clearly marked and the detached portions indicating a definite band, in other specimens very irregular and out of line with one another; this is followed by a subterminal series of minute brown dots as on the forewing. Antenna, head, thorax and abdomen concolorous with the wings; beneath: the palpi, thorax and abdomen more or less speckled with whitish.

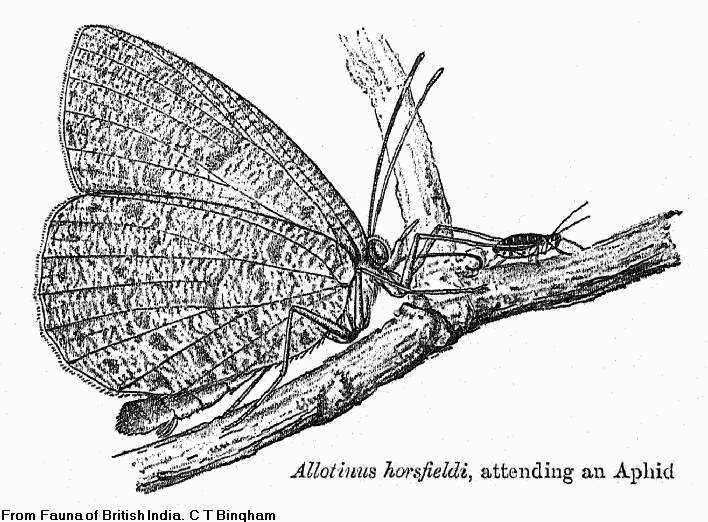
Illustration from Fauna of British India - Butterflies

Female. Similar, but in all specimens I have seen invariably smaller. Underside: ground colour of the same brown shade as in the male, the pale postcellular patch on forewing replaced by a diffuse medial patch that spreads into the cell. Hindwing: as in the male. Underside: also similar in ground colour and markings to that of the male, but the markings broader, more clearly defined, and less macular. Antenna, head, thorax and abdomen as in the male.

== Taxonomy ==
The butterfly was earlier known and is still classified by some authorities as Allotinus horsfieldii.

== Habits ==
The butterfly inhabits low-lying jungle in very wet regions. The males are fond of sitting on the tops of leaves not very high off the ground and making short circular flights. The females flutter about amongst the undergrowth and bushes at forest edges. The butterfly has also been recorded by one observer to settle over hosts of greenflies (aphids), tickle them with the proboscis and feed on the exudations.

== Subspecies ==
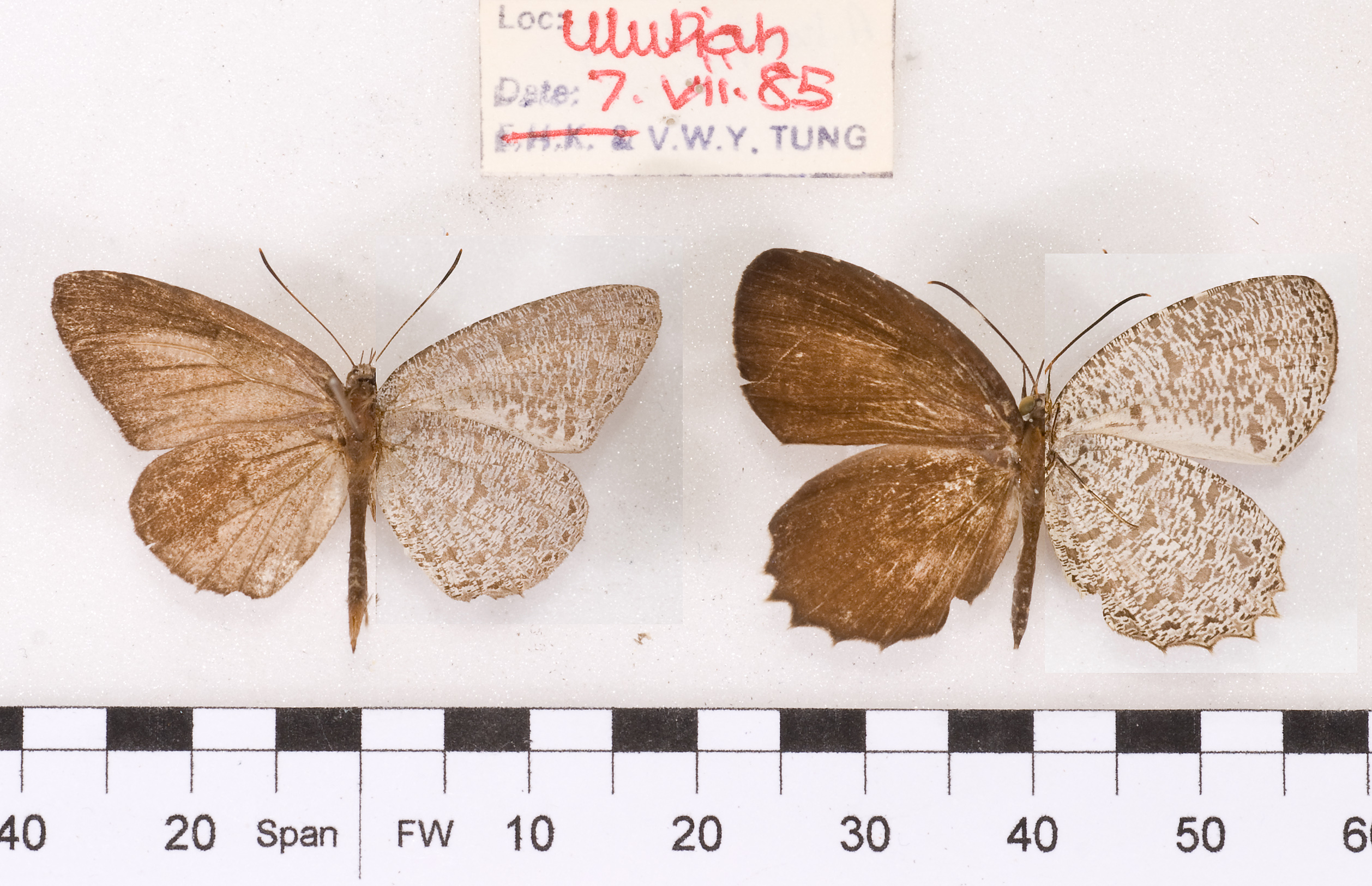
A. h. permagnus

- A. h. horsfieldi (Java)
- A. h. permagnus Fruhstorfer, 1913 (Thailand, Langkawi, Malay Peninsula, Tioman, Singapore, Borneo, Sumatra, Bangka, Batu)
- A. h. satelliticus Fruhstorfer, 1913 (Engano)
- A. h. siporana Riley, 1944 (Mentawai Island)

== See also ==
- List of butterflies of India (Lycaenidae)
