= Allotinus albicans =

Scientific classification
- Domain: Eukaryota
- Kingdom: Animalia
- Phylum: Arthropoda
- Class: Insecta
- Order: Lepidoptera
- Family: Lycaenidae
- Genus: Allotinus
- Species: A. albicans

Binomial name
- Allotinus albicans Okubo, 2007

Species of butterfly

Allotinus albicans is a butterfly in the family Lycaenidae. It was described by Okubo in 2007. It is found in the Philippines (Mindanao).
