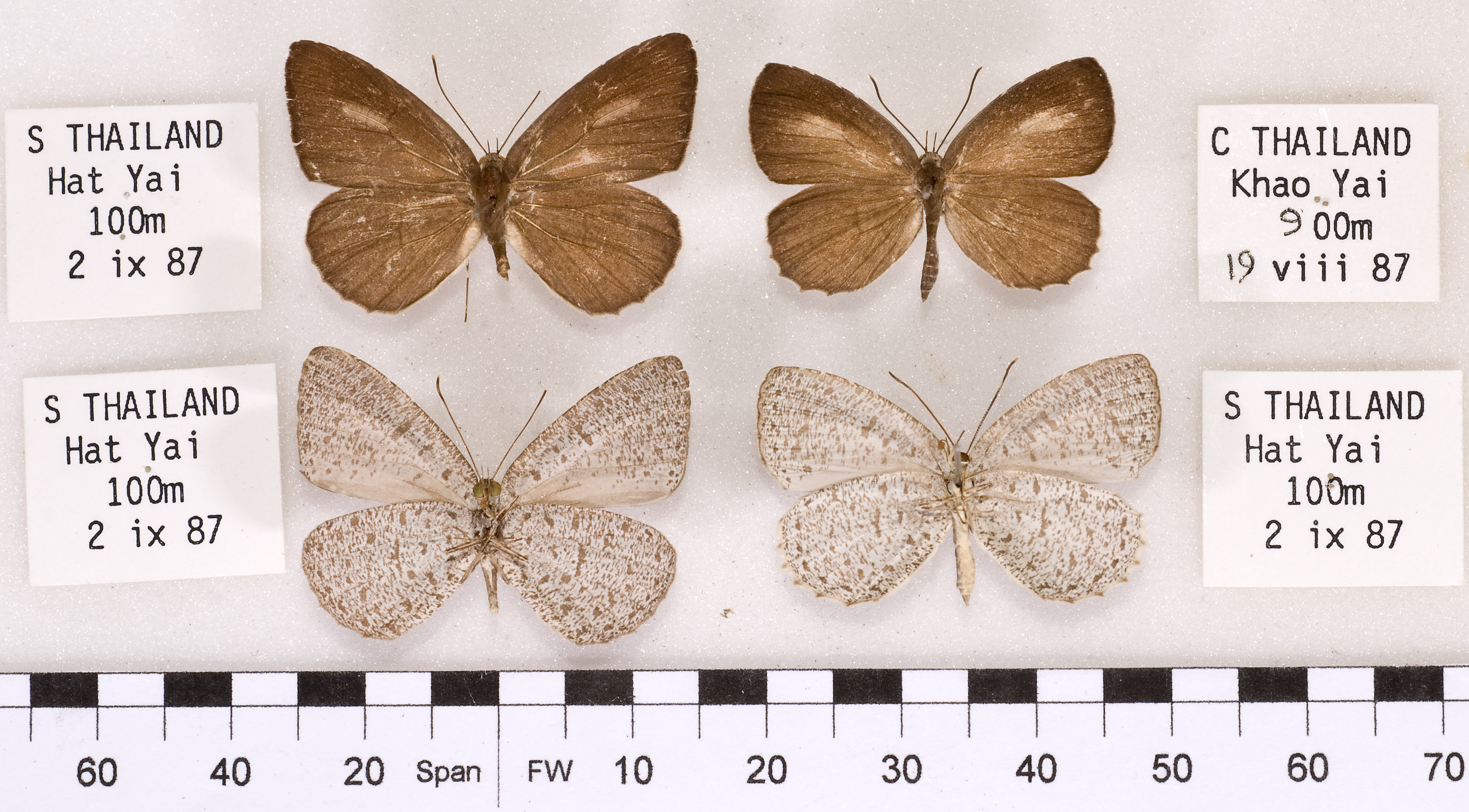

Scientific classification
- Kingdom: Animalia
- Phylum: Arthropoda
- Class: Insecta
- Order: Lepidoptera
- Family: Lycaenidae
- Genus: Allotinus
- Species: A. unicolor

Binomial name
- Allotinus unicolor C. & R. Felder, [1865]

Synonyms
- Allotinus aphocha Kheil, 1884; Allotinus posidion myriandus Fruhstorfer, 1913; Allotinus aphocha aphocha Kheil; Fruhstorfer, 1913; Allotinus unicolor myriandus Fruhstorfer; Corbet, 1939; Allotinus horsfieldi continentalis Fruhstorfer, 1913; Allotinus posidion atacinus Fruhstorfer, 1916; Allotinus unicolor atacinus Fruhstorfer; Corbet, 1939; Allotinus continentalis continentalis Fruhstorfer; Corbet, 1939; Allotinus continentalis Fruhstorfer; Eliot, 1967; Allotinus posidion georgius Fruhstorfer, 1913; Allotinus unicolor leitus Fruhstorfer, 1916; Paragerydus moorei H. H. Druce, 1895; Allotinus paetus moorei Fruhstorfer, 1913; Allotinus aphocha rebilus Fruhstorfer, 1913; Allotinus posidion posidion Fruhstorfer, 1913; Allotinus posidion molionides Fruhstorfer, 1913; Allotinus posidion niceratus Fruhstorfer, 1913; Allotinus unicolor enganicus Fruhstorfer, 1913; Allotinus unicolor bajanus Fruhstorfer, 1913; Allotinus aphocha enatheus Fruhstorfer, 1913; Allotinus horsfieldii posidion Fruhstorfer; Piepers & Snellen, 1918; Allotinus suka Piepers & Snellen, 1918 (partim); Allotinus unicolor Felder; Piepers & Snellen, 1918; Allotinus unicolor posidion Fruhstorfer; Corbet, 1939; Allotinus unicolor molionides Fruhstorfer; Corbet, 1939; Allotinus unicolor bajanus Fruhstorfer; Corbet, 1939; Allotinus posidion rekkia Riley & Godfrey, 1921; Allotinus unicolor C. & R. Felder, [1865]; Allotinus posidion eurytanus Fruhstorfer, 1913; Allotinus dilutus Corbet, 1939; Allotinus unicolor dilutus Corbet; Corbet, 1956; Allotinus aphocha zitema Fruhstorfer, 1916

= Allotinus unicolor =

Species of butterfly

Allotinus unicolor, the lesser darkie, is a butterfly in the family Lycaenidae. It was described by Cajetan and Rudolf Felder in 1865. It is found in Asia.

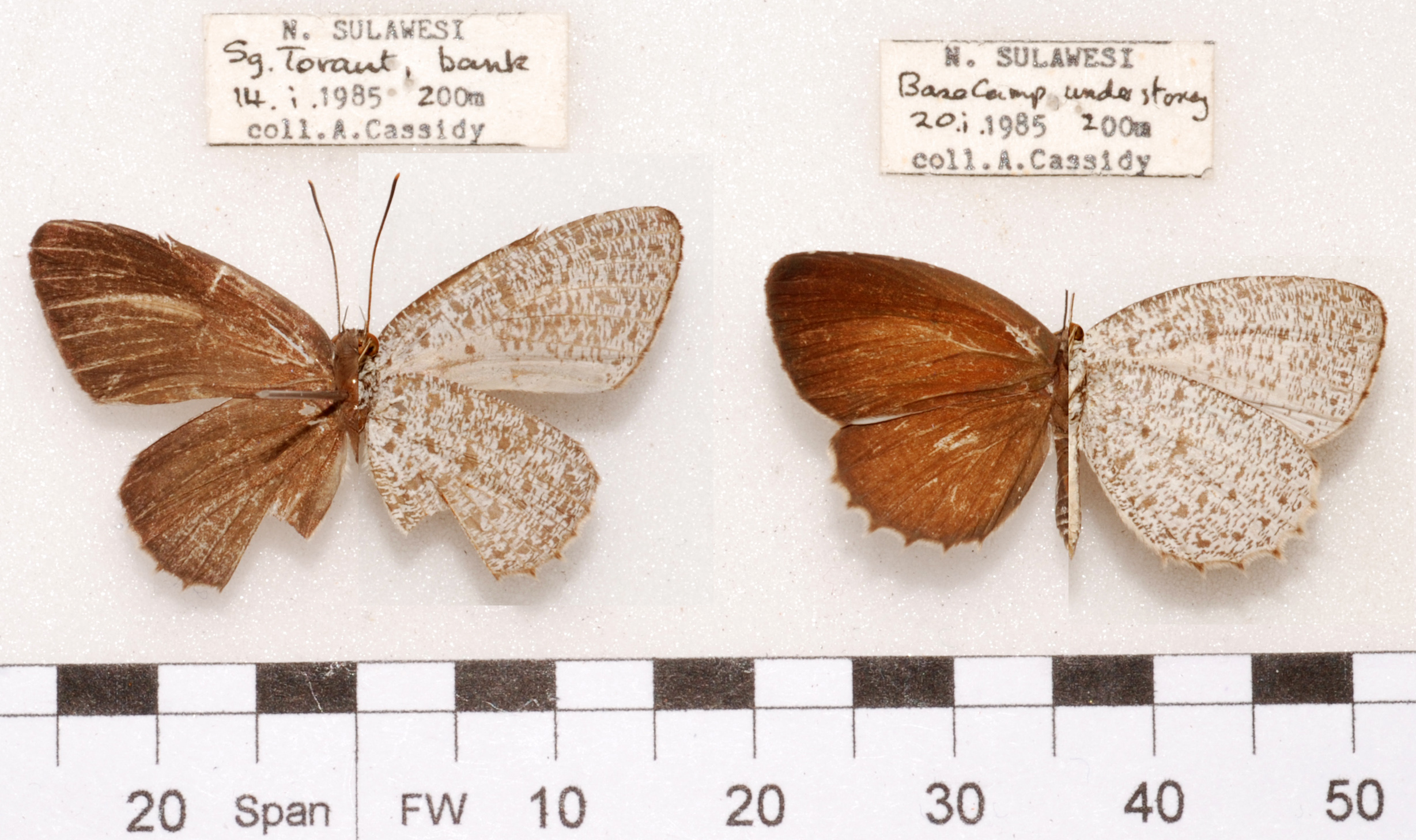
A. u. zitema

Seitz - A. unicolor. An insignificant, rare species which has hitherto been often confounded with allied species. Inferior in size to A. horsfieldi and posidion, differing from all the allies by the distinctly roundish forewings reminding us of A. aphocha Kheil. The hindwings of the female either entire, or in contrast with aphocha only with minute teeth. The sexual macula on the forewing above smaller than in posidion. Under surface white, but not so purely chalk-coloured as in paetus Nicev. Basal part and cell of both wings with thick, brown, little dashes. Both wings are, besides, distally from the cell, crossed by a remarkably pronounced series of brown spots being combined to a loose band. Uncus shorter, broader, dorsally less deeply indented than in A. aphocha.

== Subspecies ==
- A. u. unicolor (Burma, Thailand, Langkawi, Malay Peninsula, Tioman, Singapore, Borneo, Karimata, Lingga, Natuna)
- A. u. aphocha Kheil, 1884 (Sumatra, Bangka, Batu, Mentawai, Nias)
- A. u. continentalis Fruhstorfer, 1913 (Bangladesh and Assam to Burma and north-western Thailand)
- A. u. georgius Fruhstorfer, 1913 (Philippines: Bohol)
- A. u. moorei (H. H. Druce, 1895) (Borneo: Mount Kina Balu)
- A. u. posidion Fruhstorfer, 1913 (Java, Bali, Lombok, Sumbawa, Engano)
- A. u. rekkia Riley & Godfrey, 1921 (Burma, Thailand, Laos, possibly Vietnam)
- A. u. zitema Fruhstorfer, 1916 (Sulawesi, Sula)
