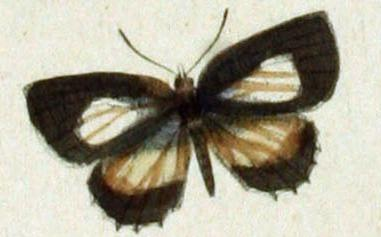
- Male
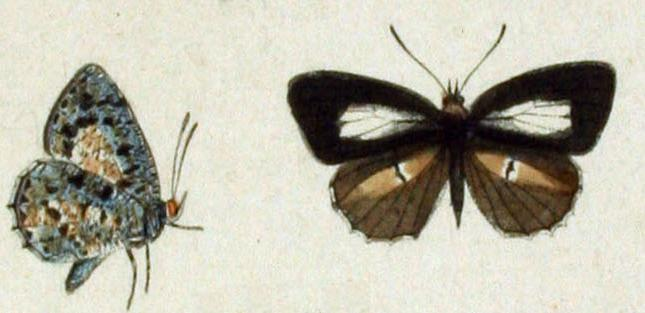
- Female

Scientific classification
- Domain: Eukaryota
- Kingdom: Animalia
- Phylum: Arthropoda
- Class: Insecta
- Order: Lepidoptera
- Family: Lycaenidae
- Genus: Allotinus
- Species: A. fallax

Binomial name
- Allotinus fallax C. & R. Felder, [1865]

Synonyms
- Allotinus fallax sabazus Fruhstorfer, 1913; Allotinus fallax zaradrus Fruhstorfer, 1915; Allotinus fallax ancius Fruhstorfer, 1913; Allotinus fallax artinus Fruhstorfer, 1916; Allotinus apus de Nicéville, 1895; Allotinus fallax michaelis Eliot, 1959; Allotinus audax H. H. Druce, 1895

= Allotinus fallax =

Species of butterfly

Allotinus fallax is a butterfly in the family Lycaenidae. It is found in Asia.

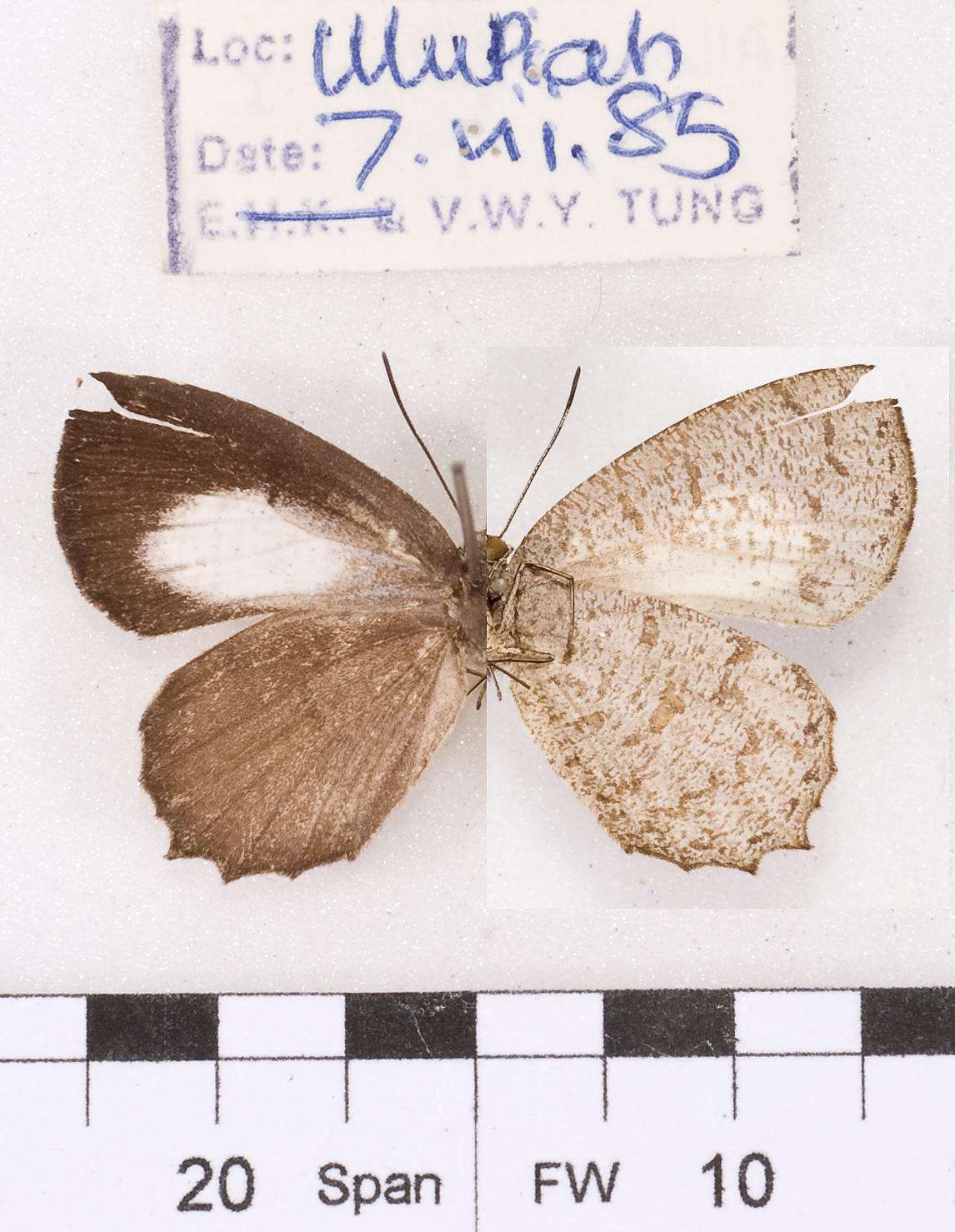
A. f. apus

== Subspecies ==
- A. f. fallax (Philippines: Luzon and Mindoro, Sibuyan, Cebu, Bohol)
- A. f. aphacus Fruhstorfer, 1913 (Philippines: Mindanao, Camiguin de Minadanao and Panaon, Talaud)
- A. f. apus de Nicéville, 1895 (Sumatra, western Malaysia)
- A. f. audax H. H. Druce, 1895 Borneo (Kina Balu)
- A. f. dotion Fruhstorfer, 1913 (Bazilan)
- A. f. eryximachus Fruhstorfer, 1913 (Philippines: Mindoro)
- A. f. tymphrestus Fruhstorfer, 1916 (Sulu Islands)
