= Abacetus audax =

Scientific classification
- Kingdom: Animalia
- Phylum: Arthropoda
- Class: Insecta
- Order: Coleoptera
- Suborder: Adephaga
- Family: Carabidae
- Genus: Abacetus
- Species: A. audax

Binomial name
- Abacetus audax Laferte-Senectere, 1853

Species of beetle

Abacetus audax is a species of ground beetle in the subfamily Pterostichinae. It was described by Laferte-Senectere in 1853 and is found in Chad and Côte d'Ivoire.
