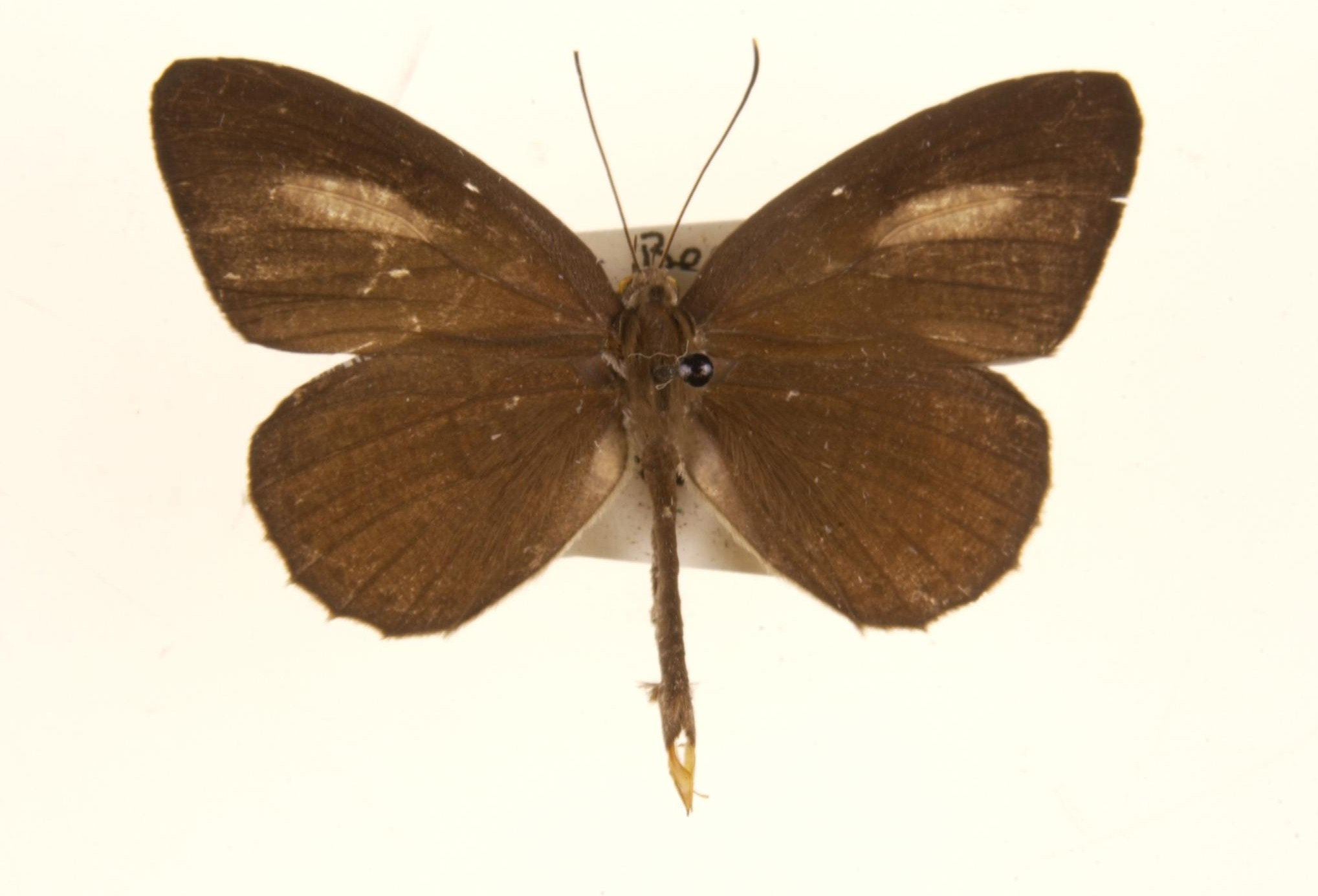
- Male Allotinus horsfieldii

Scientific classification
- Domain: Eukaryota
- Kingdom: Animalia
- Phylum: Arthropoda
- Class: Insecta
- Order: Lepidoptera
- Family: Lycaenidae
- Subfamily: Miletinae
- Tribe: Miletini
- Genus: Allotinus; C. Felder & R. Felder, [1865]

Synonyms
- Paragerydus Distant, 1884; Miletographa Röber, 1892; Fabitaras Eliot, 1986

= Allotinus =

Butterfly genus in family Lycaenidae

Allotinus is a genus of butterflies in the family Lycaenidae. The genus was erected by Cajetan Felder and Rudolf Felder in 1865. The members (species) of this genus are found in the Indomalayan realm.

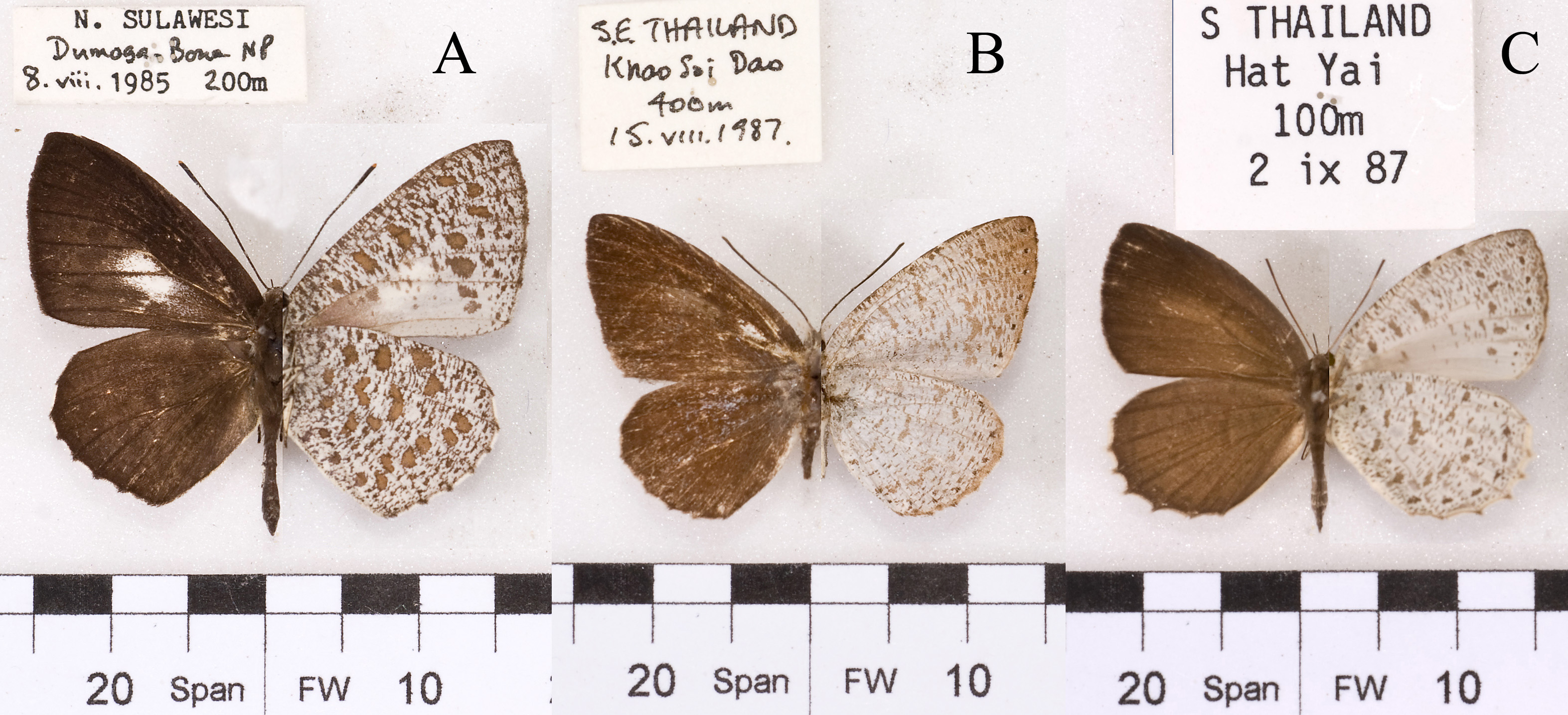
Sub-genera of Allotinus: A - Allotinus (Allotinus) major, male, Sulawesi; B - Allotinus (Fabitaras) taras, male, Thailand; C - Allotinus (Paragerydus) leogoron, female, Thailand

== Species ==
- Subgenus Allotinus
  - Allotinus agnolia Eliot, 1986
  - Allotinus albifasciatus Eliot, 1980
  - Allotinus fallax C. Felder & R. Felder, [1865]
  - Allotinus major C. Felder & R. Felder, [1865]
  - Allotinus maximus Staudinger, 1888
  - Allotinus nicholsi Moulton, [1912]
  - Allotinus otsukai Takanami & Seki, 1990
  - Allotinus subviolaceus C. Felder & R. Felder, [1865]
- Subgenus Fabitaras Eliot, 1986
  - Allotinus bidiensis Eliot, 1986
  - Allotinus borneensis Moulton, 1911
  - Allotinus brooksi Eliot, 1986
  - Allotinus fabius (Distant & Pryer, 1887)
  - Allotinus kudaratus Takanami, 1990
  - Allotinus nigritus (Semper, 1889)
  - Allotinus portunus (de Nicéville, 1894)
  - Allotinus punctatus (Semper, 1889)
  - Allotinus sarrastes Fruhstorfer, 1913
  - Allotinus strigatus Moulton, 1911
  - Allotinus taras (Doherty, 1889)
- Subgenus Paragerydus Distant, 1884
  - Allotinus albatus C. Felder & R. Felder, [1865]
  - Allotinus albicans Okubo, 2007
  - Allotinus apries Fruhstorfer, 1913
  - Allotinus corbeti Eliot, 1956
  - Allotinus davidis Eliot, 1959
  - Allotinus drumila (Moore, [1866])
  - Allotinus horsfieldi (Moore, [1858])
  - Allotinus leogoron Fruhstorfer, 1915
  - Allotinus luzonensis Eliot, 1967
  - Allotinus macassarensis (Holland, 1891)
  - Allotinus melos (H. H. Druce, 1896)
  - Allotinus nivalis (H. Druce, 1873)
  - Allotinus paetus (de Nicéville, 1895)
  - Allotinus parapus Fruhstorfer, 1913
  - Allotinus samarensis Eliot, 1986
  - Allotinus substrigosus (Moore, 1884)
  - Allotinus unicolor C. Felder & R. Felder, [1865]
- Subgenus unknown
  - Allotinus thalebanus Murayama & Kimura, 1990

== Former species ==
- Allotinus distanti Staudinger, 1889 = Logania marmorata palawana
