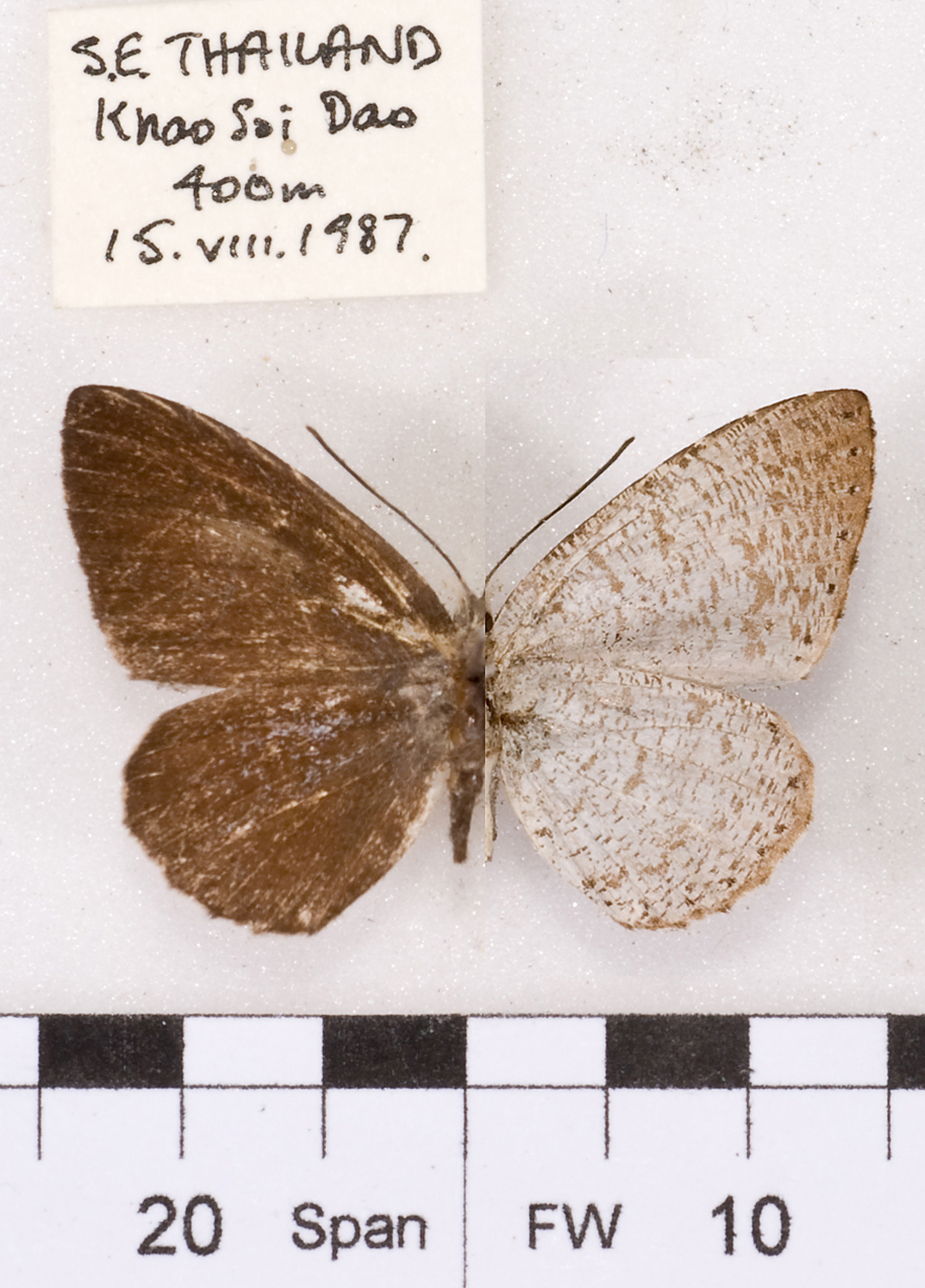

Scientific classification
- Domain: Eukaryota
- Kingdom: Animalia
- Phylum: Arthropoda
- Class: Insecta
- Order: Lepidoptera
- Family: Lycaenidae
- Genus: Allotinus
- Species: A. taras

Binomial name
- Allotinus taras (Doherty, 1889)

Synonyms
- Paragerydus taras Doherty, 1889; Paragerydus panormis Elwes, 1893

= Allotinus taras =

Species of butterfly

Allotinus taras is a butterfly in the family Lycaenidae. It was described by Doherty in 1889. It is found in Burma.
