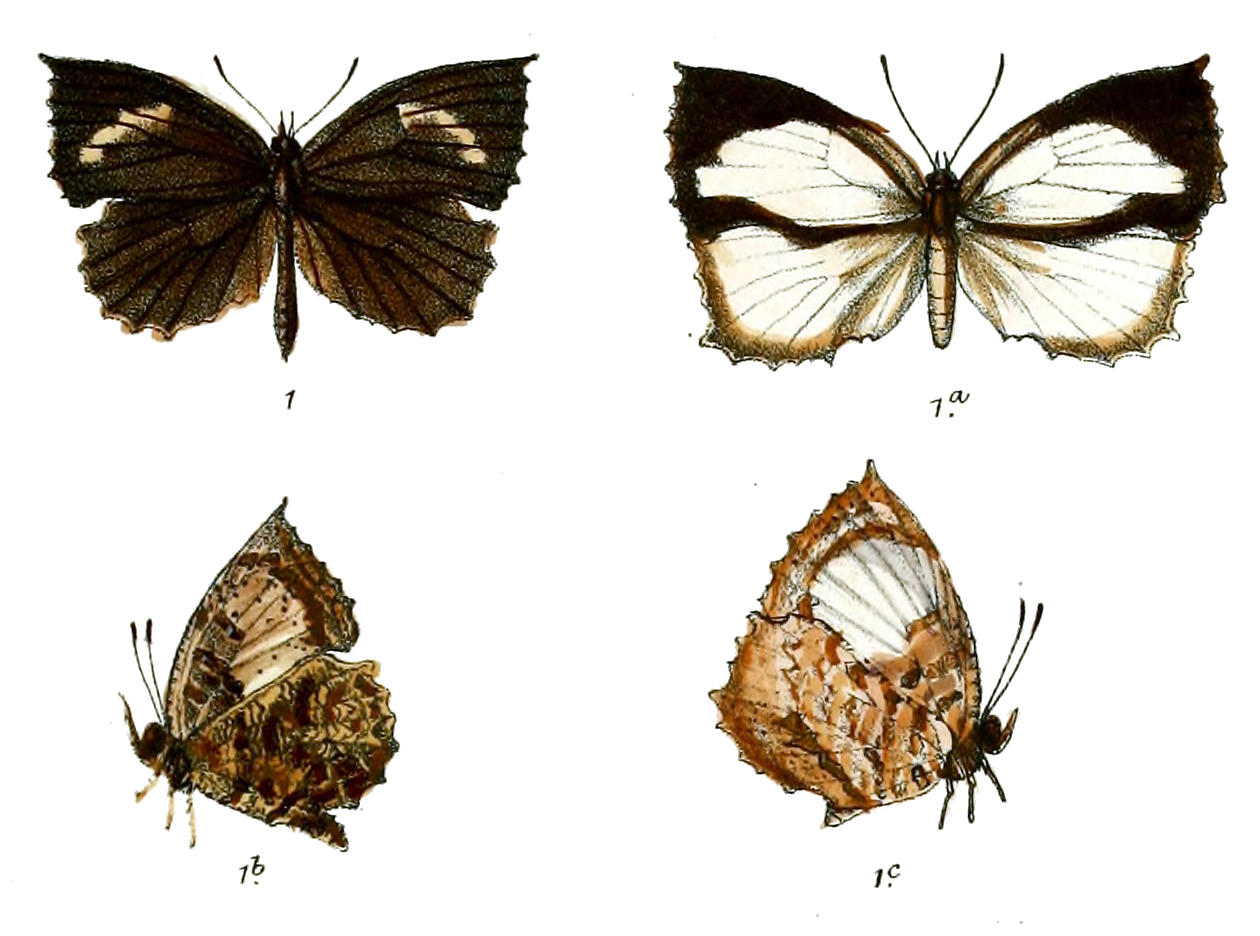

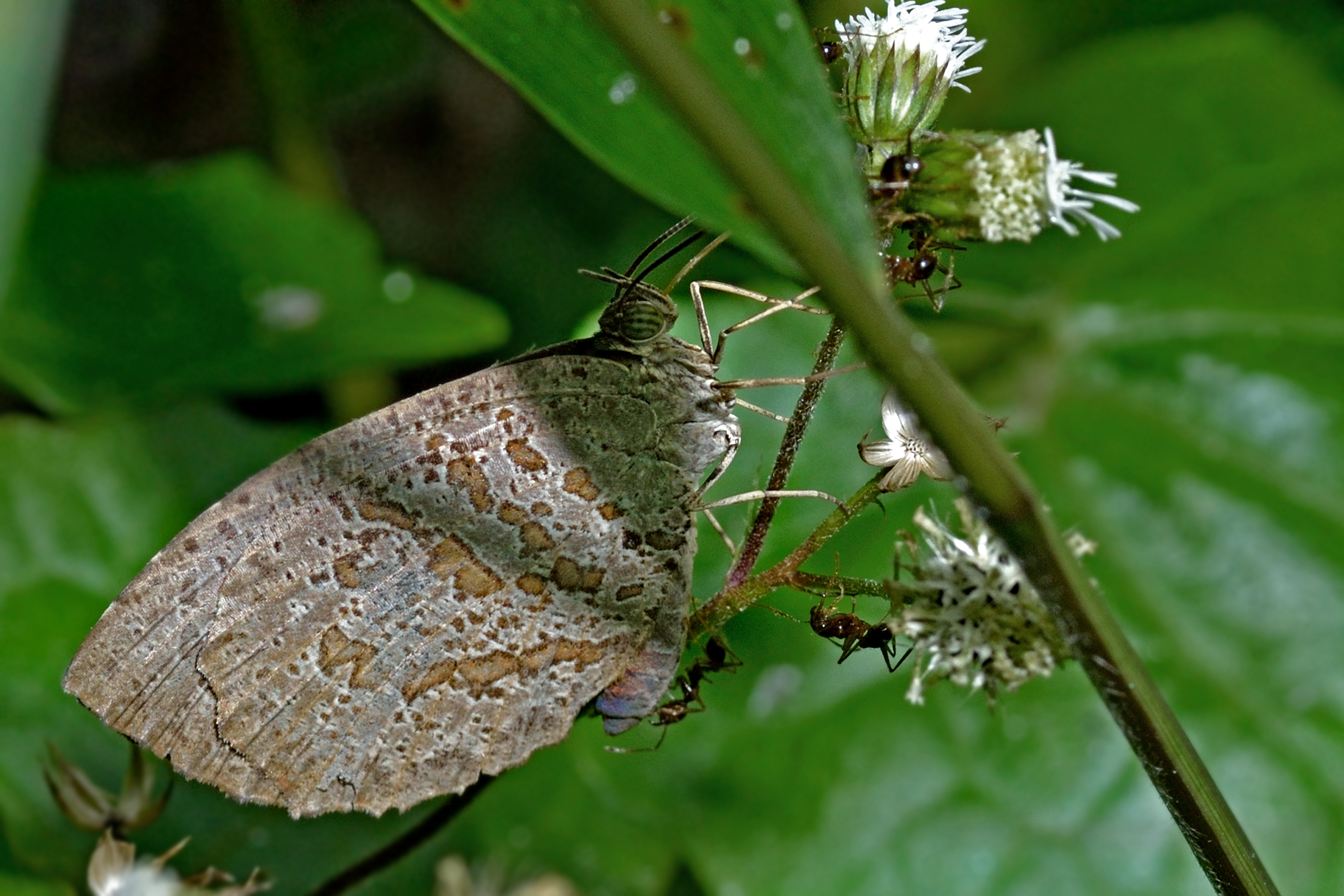

Scientific classification
- Domain: Eukaryota
- Kingdom: Animalia
- Phylum: Arthropoda
- Class: Insecta
- Order: Lepidoptera
- Family: Lycaenidae
- Genus: Allotinus
- Species: A. drumila

Binomial name
- Allotinus drumila (Moore, [1866])

Synonyms
- Miletus drumila Moore, [1866]; Allotinus multistrigatus de Nicéville, 1886; Miletus insignis Staudinger, 1888

= Allotinus drumila =

Crenulate darkie

Species of butterfly

Allotinus drumila, the crenulate darkie, is a small butterfly found in India (Assam, Sikkim), Burma, Thailand, Laos, Vietnam, and Yunnan (China) that belongs to the lycaenids or blues family.

== Description ==
Male upperside: earthy brown. Forewing: costa at base and a broad outward discal streak from beyond apex of cell curved downwards towards but not reaching the tornal angle, dull white, diffuse at the edges; apex and termen broadly very dark blackish-brown. Hindwing: costal margin above the subcostal vein and in a line with it up to the termen similarly very dark blackish-brown, the rest of the brown colour uniform without any white. Underside, forewing: dull pale brown, costal margin and disc mottled with small catenulated spots of dark brown; cell with three short transverse bars of dark brown, the middle bar extended below the cell but not reaching the dorsum; a white curved discal band as on the upperside, but obscure, diffuse and ill-defined, merged with a pale area along the middle of the dorsum; termen broadly margined with dark rusty brown that has more or less of a mottled appearance. Hindwing: dull pale brown thickly mottled with catenulated spots and strigeo of dark rusty brown; catenulated, somewhat broken, transverse irregular bands of the latter colour cross the base, middle and apex of the cell; a similar short band is placed at right angles to the dorsal margin and curving slightly upwards terminates at vein 3. Antennae dark brown; head, thorax and abdomen rusty brown; beneath: the palpi, thorax and abdomen narrowly whitish.

Female upperside: white. Forewing: apical, terminal and tornal areas black, the inner margin of the black commences just before the middle of the costa, and runs obliquely outward in a sinuous curve to base of the apical fourth of vein 2, thence it is produced for a short distance inwardly along that vein and terminates at the middle of the dorsal margin. Hindwing: a broad black stripe along the costal margin; the termen somewhat narrowly pale yellowish-brown. Underside white, the markings somewhat variable. Forewing: costa, apex and termen with minute earthy-brown speckles, sparse along the costa, more dense on the termen; on the latter they coalesce and form a brown smudgy border that is bounded on the inner side by a curved, postdiscal, more or less clearly defined, narrow, yellowish-brown band; cell crossed transversely by a basal, a medial and an apical short similar band; the medial band darkened in colour and continued almost to the dorsum, the apical band along the discocellulars. Hindwing: with minute brown speckles, more or less lightly and irregularly stained with rusty brown; basal half with obscure, transverse, narrow, macular, earthy-brown bauds that are well-defined only anteriorly, the basal one produced up to the dorsum; a short dark-edged transverse band from the tornus to vein 4 running parallel to the costal margin, the lower edge of the band acutely and irregularly dentate; the terminal and tornal areas below this band washed with earthy brown. Antenna, head, thorax and abdomen as in the male but very much paler.

== See also ==
- List of butterflies of India (Lycaenidae)
