= John Coney Moulton =

British soldier and zoologist (1886–1926)

John Coney Moulton OBE
- Born: 1886; St Leonards-on-Sea
- Died: 1926; London
- Employer: British Army
- Notable work: Sarawak Museum Journal
- Children: Alex Moulton

John Coney Moulton OBE (11 December 1886 – 6 June 1926) was a British Army officer and amateur zoologist who spent many years in South-East Asia.

== Career ==
He was curator of the Sarawak Museum from November 1908 to January 1915, and founding editor of the Sarawak Museum Journal in 1911. He served with the Wiltshire Regiment in India 1915–1916 and as staff officer in Singapore 1916–1919, following which he resigned with the rank of Major. In July 1919, he was appointed Director of the Raffles Museum in Singapore, a position he held until 1923. After this, Moulton returned to Sarawak as the Chief Secretary to the third White Rajah, Charles Vyner Brooke.

Moulton specialised in research on cicadas. He was interested in entomology, birds and mammals. Most of his scientific papers were published in the journals of the Straits, and Malayan branches of the Royal Asiatic Society as well as in the Sarawak Museum Journal.

The genus Moultonianthus Merr. and many species of plants were named after him.

== Personal life ==
Moulton was born in St Leonards-on-Sea, Sussex. The inventor Alex Moulton was his son. After returning to England on 29 May 1926 for a three-month break and visit to his Wiltshire ancestral home, The Hall, Bradford-on-Avon, he fell ill on the following day. He was operated on for appendicitis in a London nursing home by Arbuthnot Lane but died there on 6 June at the age of 39. He is buried in a family grave with his parents and widow in the churchyard at Christ Church, Bradford-on-Avon.
