= Hans Fruhstorfer =

German entomologist

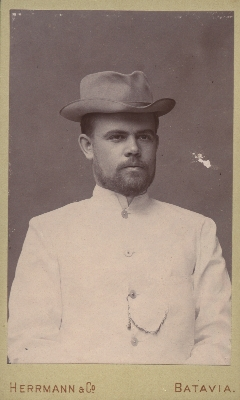
- Portrait photograph taken in Batavia, Dutch East Indies
- Born: 7 March 1866; Passau, Kingdom of Baviaria
- Died: 9 April 1922 (aged 56); Munich, Germany
- Known for: Butterfly taxonomy
- Scientific career
- Fields: Entomology, malacology
- Institutions: Private collection
- Author abbrev. (zoology): Fruhstorfer

Hans Fruhstorfer (1866 – 1922) was a German explorer, insect and shell trader and entomologist who specialised in Lepidoptera. He collected and described new species of exotic butterflies, especially in Adalbert Seitz's Macrolepidoptera of the World. He is best known for his work on the butterflies of Java.

Fruhstorfer was born on 7 March 1866 in Passau, Kingdom of Bavaria. His career began in 1888 when he spent two years in Brazil. His expedition in Brazil was financially successful and led to his becoming a professional collector. After his successful endeavor, he spent some time in Sri Lanka (then Ceylon), then in 1890 he went to Java for three years, visiting Sumatra. Between 1895 and 1896 he collected in Sulawesi, Lombok and Bali. In 1899, he went on a three-year journey to the United States, Oceania, Japan, China, Tonkin, Annam and Siam, returning via India.

Following his travels, he settled in Geneva where he wrote monographs based on the specimens in his extensive private collection. Many of these were incorporated into Seitz's work. In taxonomy he made extensive use of the structure of the male genitalia. Fruhstorfer, in these years also studied Palearctic butterflies, Orthoptera and botany. No longer travelling himself, Fruhstorfer employed the collectors Hans Sauter in Taiwan (then Formosa) and Franz Werner in New Guinea.

Fruhstorfer's collections are deposited at the Museum für Naturkunde in Berlin, the Natural History Museum in London and the Muséum national d'histoire naturelle in Paris, as well as in many other museums.

Fruhstorfer died in Munich on 9 April 1922, following a failed operation for cancer.

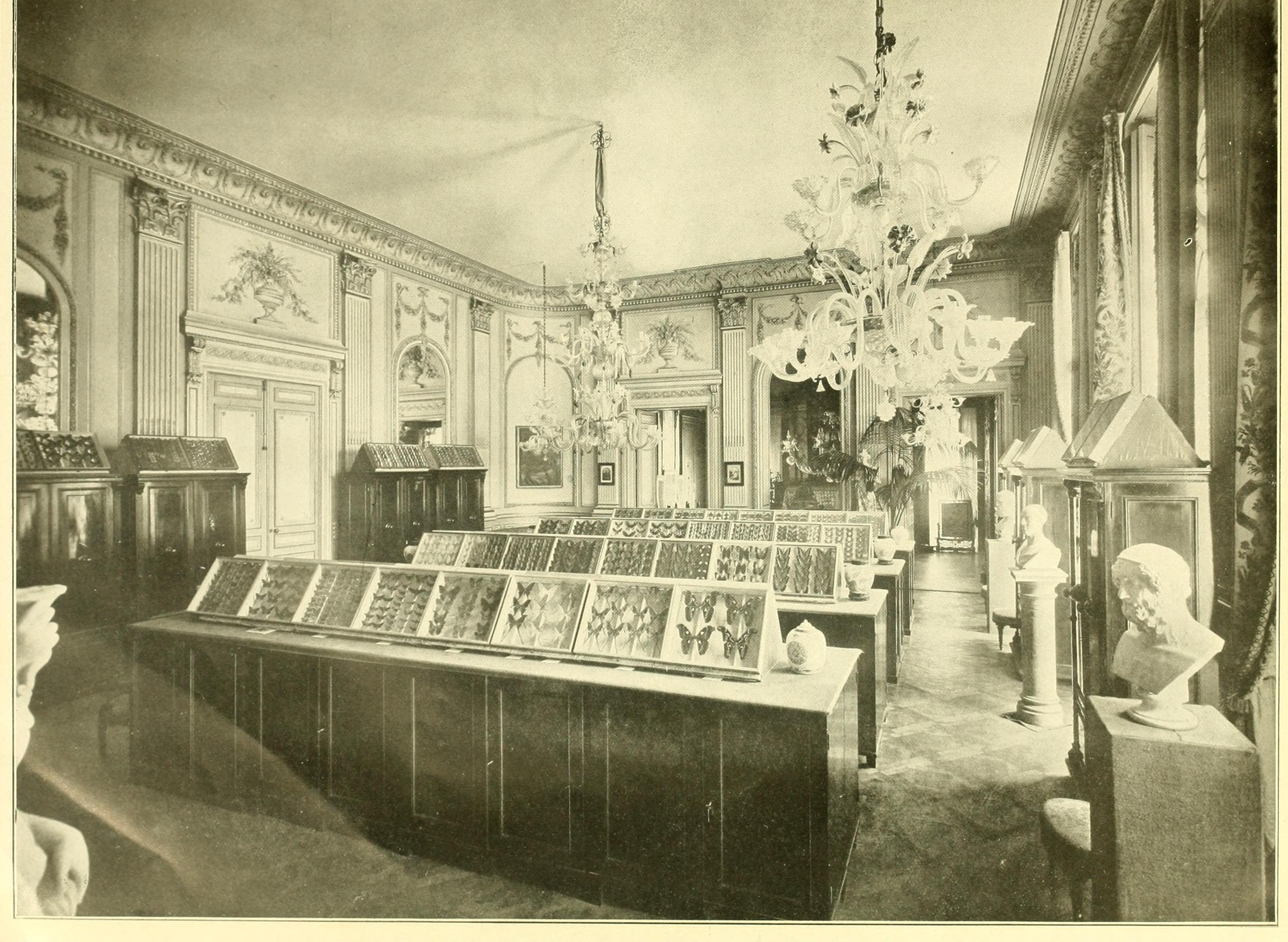
The Hans Fruhstorfer Collection

== Legacy ==
Fruhstorfer is commemorated in the scientific name of a species of snake, Tetralepis fruhstorferi, which is endemic to Java.

== Works ==
Partial list:

- "Verzeichnis der von mir in Tonkin, Annam und Siam gesammelten Nymphaliden und Besprechung verwandter Formen", Wiener entomologische Zeitung 25: 307–362, pls. 1,2. (1906)
- "Family Pieridae", in Adalbert Seitz (ed.) The Macrolepidoptera of the World 9: 119–190, pls. Alfred Kernen, Stuttgart. (1910)
- "Family Lycaenidae", in Adalbert Seitz (ed.) The Macrolepidoptera of the World 9: 803–901, pls. (part) Alfred Kernen, Stuttgart. (1915–1924)
- Wikispecies (see below) provides another list and links to digitised papers by Fruhstorfer

== Sources ==
- The Entomologist, by Royal Entomological Society of London, British Trust for Entomology. 1922 - Page 144. via - Google Books.
- Otakar Kudrna 1985: "European butterflies named by Hans Fruhstorfer" in Nachrichten des entomologischen Vereins Apollo. (Suppl.) 5 : 1-60.
- Gerardo Lamas: "A Bibliography of the Zoological Publications of Hans Fruhstorfer (1886* - 1922†)" (PDF) in Entomofauna 26 6): 57–100. via - Internet Archive.
