= John Nevill Eliot =

English entomologist (1912–2003)

- Born: 29 August 1912; Woolwich, London, England
- Died: 11 April 2003 (aged 90); Taunton, Somerset, England
- Scientific career
- Fields: Entomology

Lt. Col. John Nevill Eliot (29 August 1912 – 11 April 2003) was an English entomologist who specialised in Oriental Lepidoptera especially Lycaenidae.

He was born in Woolwich, London and died in Taunton, Somerset.
