= Doris =

Doris may refer to:

== People and fictional characters ==
- Doris (given name), including a list of women, men and fictional characters
- Doris (surname), a list of people
- Doris family, an Italian banking family
- Doris (singer), stage name of Swedish rock and pop singer Doris Svensson (1947–2023)
- DORIS, stage name of Frank Dorrey (born c. 1999), American visual artist and rapper

== Animals ==
- Doris (gastropod), a genus of marine gastropod molluscs in the family Dorididae
- Apantesis doris, the Doris tiger moth, a moth of the family Erebidae
- Heliconius doris, the Doris butterfly of Central and South America
- Orange-peel doris, a nudibranch (slug)

== Places ==
- Doris (Asia Minor), a region of Asia Minor inhabited by Dorians
- Doris (Greece), a region in central Greece in which the Dorians had their traditional homeland
- Doris, Iowa, United States
- Doris Cove, South Shetland Islands

== Film and television ==
- Doris (TV series), a British animated children's television series
- Doris, or DOR-15, a robotic bowler hat and main antagonist of Meet the Robinsons
- Doris the waitress, in the 1993 American fantasy comedy Groundhog Day
- Doris, mother of the titular character in the Canadian television series Caillou

== Music ==
- Doris (opera), an 1889 opera by Alfred Cellier
- Doris (album), a 2013 studio album by Earl Sweatshirt
- "Doris" (song), a 2017 single by Suicide Silence from their self-titled album

== Ships ==
- Doris (sailing yacht), an America's Cup type racing yacht built in 1905
- French submarine Doris, three submarines of the French navy
- HMS Doris, various ships of the British Royal Navy
- USS Doris B. III (SP-733), a United States Navy patrol boat in commission from 1917 to 1918
- USS Doris B. IV (SP-625), a United States Navy patrol boat in commission from 1917 to 1919

== Other uses ==
- Doris (mythology), several figures from Greek mythology, including:
  - Doris (Oceanid), mother of the Nereids
- DORIS (particle accelerator), an electron–positron storage ring
- DORIS (satellite system), a French system used for satellite orbit positioning
- 48 Doris, an asteroid
- F.V.D. Doris, a German glider
- List of storms named Doris

== See also ==
- Dorries
- Dorit (disambiguation), the Modern Hebrew form of "Doris"
