= Dorrit =

Dorrit is a feminine given name. Persons bearing the name include:

- Amy Dorrit, known as "Little Dorrit", the heroine of Charles Dickens' novel of the same name (1855-7)
  - As an English surname, Dorrit may be a variant of the surname Durward, or a matronymic derived from the given name Dorothy.
- Dorrit Black (1891–1951), Australian artist
- Dorrit Dekk (1917–2014), Czech-British artist
- Dorrit Hoffleit (1907–2007), American astronomer
- Dorrit Jacob, German-Australian geochemist
- Dorrit Kristensen (born 1938), Danish swimmer
- Dorrit Moussaieff (born 1950), First Lady of Iceland
- Dorrit Reventlow (born 1942), Danish translator, benefactor, philanthropist, social activist, and widow of Prince Dimitri Romanov
- Dorrit Weixler (1892–1916), German actress
- Dorrit Willumsen (born 1940), Danish writer

== See also ==
- Dorit
