= Durwood =

Durwood or Derwood may refer to:

- Bob Andrews (guitarist) (born 1959), a.k.a. Derwood, British musician
- Durwood Keeton (born 1952), American football player
- Durwood Merrill (1938-2003), Major League Baseball umpire
- Durwood Roquemore (born 1960), former professional football player
- Derwood Williams (1889–1973), American politician, Missouri senator
- Gene Derwood (1909–1954), American poet and painter
- Derwood, Maryland, an unincorporated area
- Durwood, Oklahoma, unincorporated community
- Durwood Theatres, former name of AMC Theatres, founded by Edward Durwood
- Durwood, the name used by Endora for her son-in-law Darrin Stephens in the TV show Bewitched

== See also ==
- Durward (disambiguation)
