= List of storms named Doris =

The name Doris has been used for one tropical cyclone in the Atlantic Ocean, eight in the West Pacific Ocean, and one in the South-West Indian Ocean. Doris has also been used for one European windstorm.

In the Atlantic:

- Hurricane Doris (1975) – a Category 2 hurricane that became the first Atlantic storm to be upgraded to hurricane intensity solely with satellite imagery

In the West Pacific:

- Tropical Storm Doris (1945)
- Typhoon Doris (1950) (T1113, 16W) – a Category 4-equivalent super typhoon
- Typhoon Doris (1953) (T2216, 18W) – a Category 5-equivalent super typhoon
- Typhoon Doris (1958) (T1705, 07W) – a Category 4-equivalent super typhoon
- Typhoon Doris (1964) (T0429, 32W, Isang) – a Category 1-equivalent typhoon that affected the Caroline Islands and Ryukyu Islands
- Typhoon Doris (1969) (10W) – a Category 1-equivalent typhoon that affected Vietnam and Laos
- Tropical Storm Doris (1972) (17W) – a severe tropical storm that did not affect land
- Tropical Storm Doris (1975) (16W) – a severe tropical storm that affected China

In the South-West Indian:

- Cyclone Doris (1961) – a Category 1-equivalent tropical cyclone

In Europe:

- Storm Doris (2017)
