= Durward =

Durward may refer to:

== People ==
- Alan Durward (died after 1264 or in 1275), effective ruler of Scotland at several times during the minority of Alexander III
- Durward Gorham Hall (1910–2001), American politician
- Durward Kirby (1912–2000), American television host and announcer
- Durward Knowles (1917–2018), Olympic champion sailor from the Bahamas
- Durward Lely (1852–1944), Scottish opera singer

== Places ==
- Durward, Alberta, a locality in Municipal District of Willow Creek No. 26
- Durward's Glen, a historic property in Caledonia, Columbia County, Wisconsin
- Durward Street, London, England

== Other uses ==
- Hostarius, alternately Doorward or Durward, an office in medieval Scotland

== See also ==
- Quentin Durward (disambiguation)
- Durwood (disambiguation)
