= 1958 Pacific typhoon season =

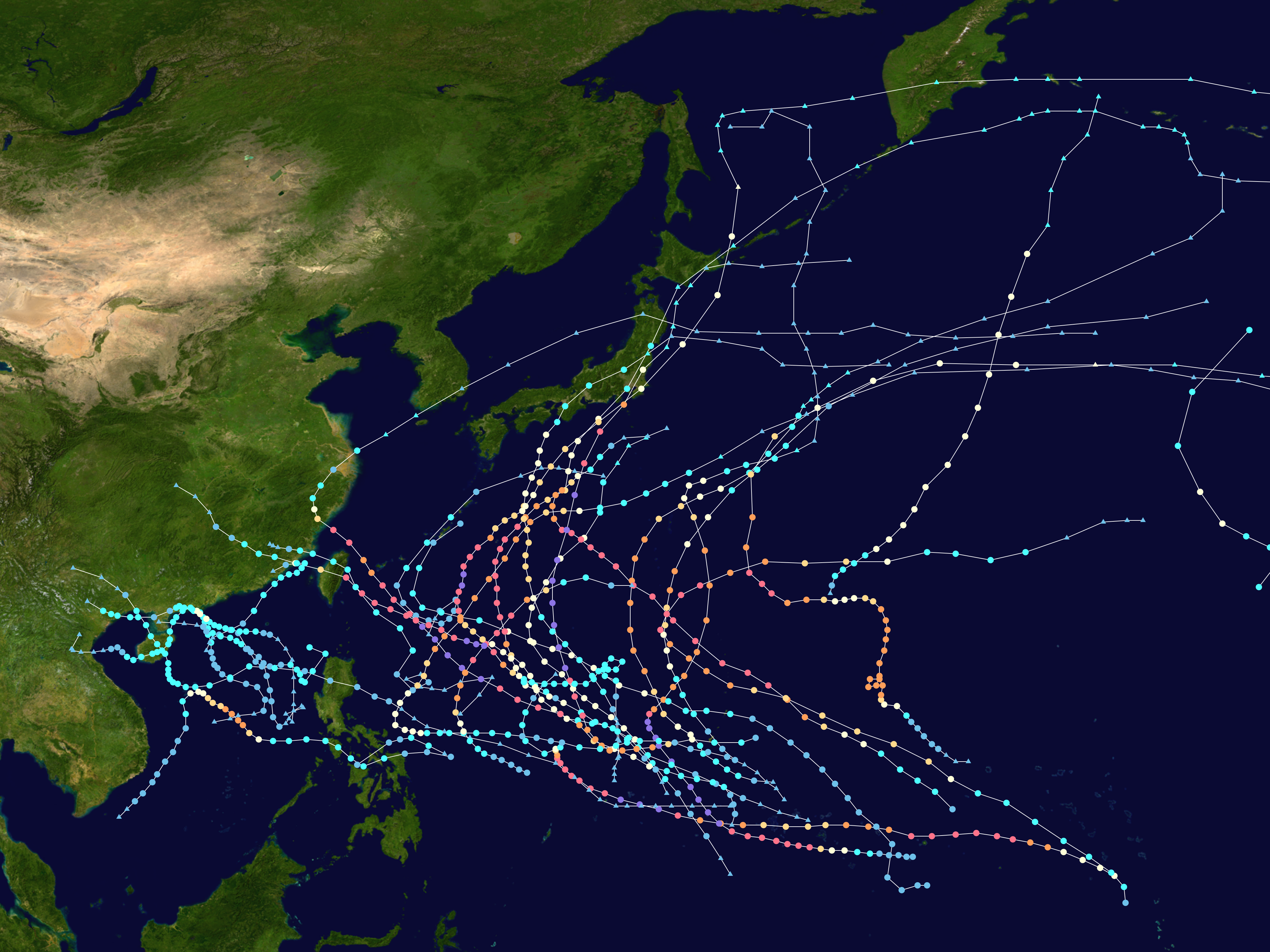
- Season summary map

Seasonal boundaries
- First system formed: January 6, 1958
- Last system dissipated: December 8, 1958

Strongest storm
- Name: Ida
  - Maximum winds: 325 km/h (200 mph) (1-minute sustained)
  - Lowest pressure: 877 hPa (mbar)

Seasonal statistics
- Total depressions: 24
- Total storms: 23
- Typhoons: 21
- Very strong typhoons: 9 (unofficial)
- Total fatalities: Unknown
- Total damage: Unknown

Related articles
- 1958 Atlantic hurricane season; 1958 Pacific hurricane season; 1950s North Indian Ocean cyclone seasons

The 1958 Pacific typhoon season was an event in the annual cycle of tropical cyclone formation. The season had no official bounds, but tropical cyclones in the Western Pacific Ocean normally develop between May and October. The season was below average in storms, with only twenty-three forming. However, all but two of those storms developed into typhoons, resulting in a well above-average number of typhoons, and a very high ACE figure of 445.8 units. In addition, there were also nine tropical storms tracked only by the JMA. The season began very early, with a very rare super typhoon in January, Typhoon Ophelia, and ended in early December with Typhoon Olga. It also featured Typhoon Ida, the strongest storm ever recorded at that time.

The scope of this article is limited to the Pacific Ocean, north of the equator and west of the International Date Line. Storms that form east of the date line and north of the equator are called hurricanes; see 1958 Pacific hurricane season. Tropical Storms formed in the entire west pacific basin were assigned a name by the Fleet Weather Center on Guam.

== Systems ==
=== Super Typhoon Ophelia ===
- Typhoon (JMA)
- Category 5 super typhoon (SSHWS)
- Duration: January 6 – January 17
- Peak intensity: 260 km/h (160 mph) (1-min); 917 hPa (mbar)

At noon on December 31, a vortex was noted along the Intertropical Convergence Zone about 1,300 miles (2,100 km) south of Hawaii. On January 7, the relatively small tropical storm struck Jaluit Atoll within the southern Marshall Islands, killing 14 people. It rapidly intensified, and reached winds of 140 miles per hour (230 km/h) the next day. Conditions became unfavorable, and steadily weakened to 105 miles per hour (169 km/h) winds. Ponape was struck on January 10, where Ophelia tore off the roof of the United States Weather Bureau office. On January 11, Truk was struck. The Weather Bureau's inflation shelter was destroyed, with other buildings on site severely damaged. On the 12th, favorable conditions allowed Ophelia to reintensify, reaching a peak of 160 miles per hour (260 km/h) on the 13th. Ophelia severely impacted Yap, removing the Weather Bureau office's sheet metal roof and damaging the inflation building, theodolite, and radio antenna. After maintaining that intensity for 18 hours, it quickly weakened as it drifted northward, and dissipated on the 17th. Typhoon Ophelia caused widespread damage on several islands of the Western Pacific. Ophelia also killed nine people when a USAF WB-50 crashed during a recon flight into the storm on January 15.

=== JMA Tropical Storm Two ===
- Tropical storm (JMA)
- Tropical storm (SSHWS)
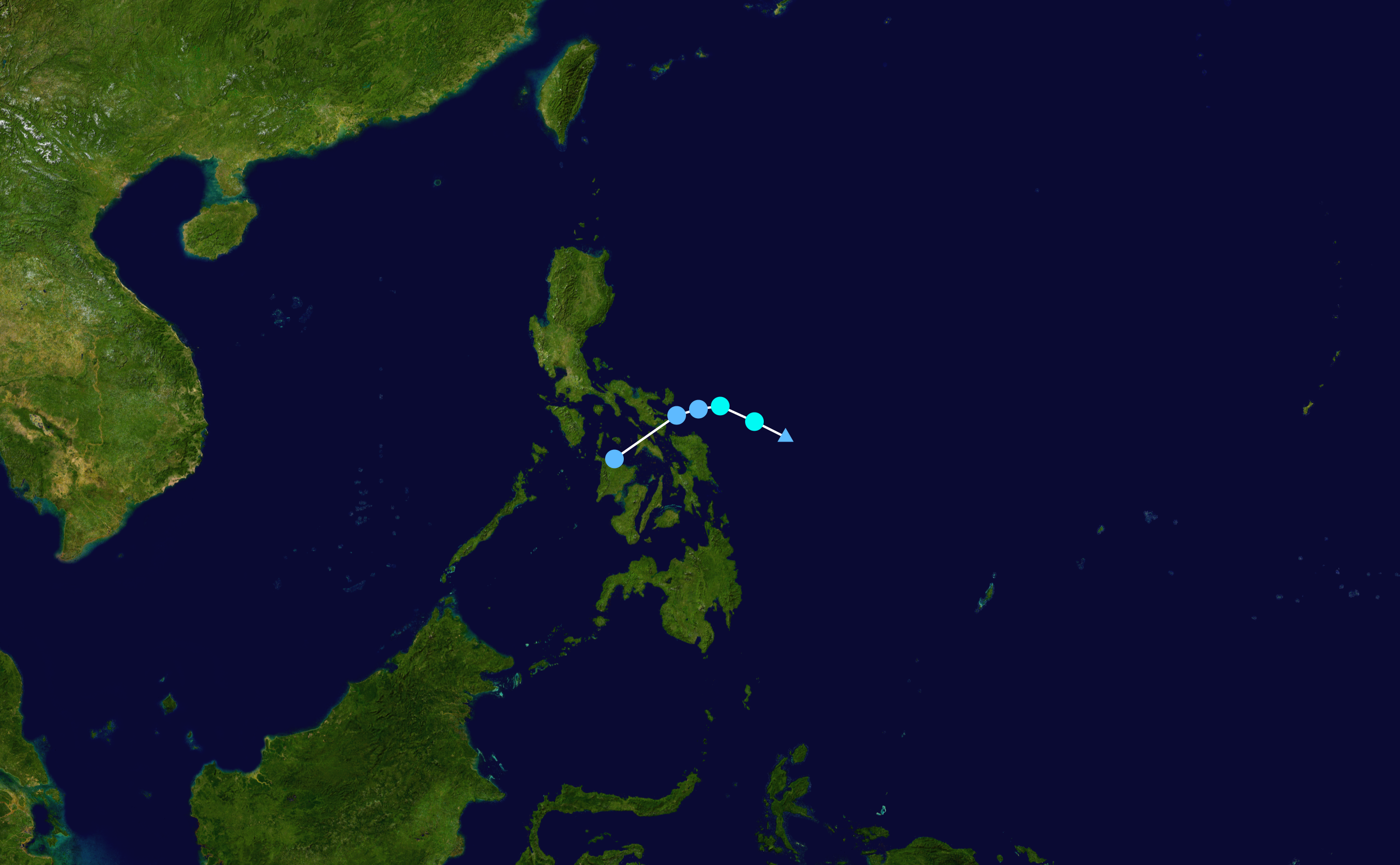
- Duration: April 29 – April 30
- Peak intensity: 95 km/h (60 mph) (1-min); 995 hPa (mbar)

Tropical Storm 02 developed on April 29. It struck Philippines before dissipating on the following day.

=== Super Typhoon Phyllis ===
- Typhoon (JMA)
- Category 5 super typhoon (SSHWS)
- Duration: May 23 – June 2
- Peak intensity: 295 km/h (185 mph) (1-min); 903 hPa (mbar)

On May 29, Super Typhoon Phyllis attained a peak of 185 miles per hour (298 km/h), the strongest typhoon on record in May at the time. Phyllis remained over open waters, and dissipated on June 2, southeast of Japan.

=== JMA Tropical Storm Four ===
- Tropical storm (JMA)
- Tropical storm (SSHWS)
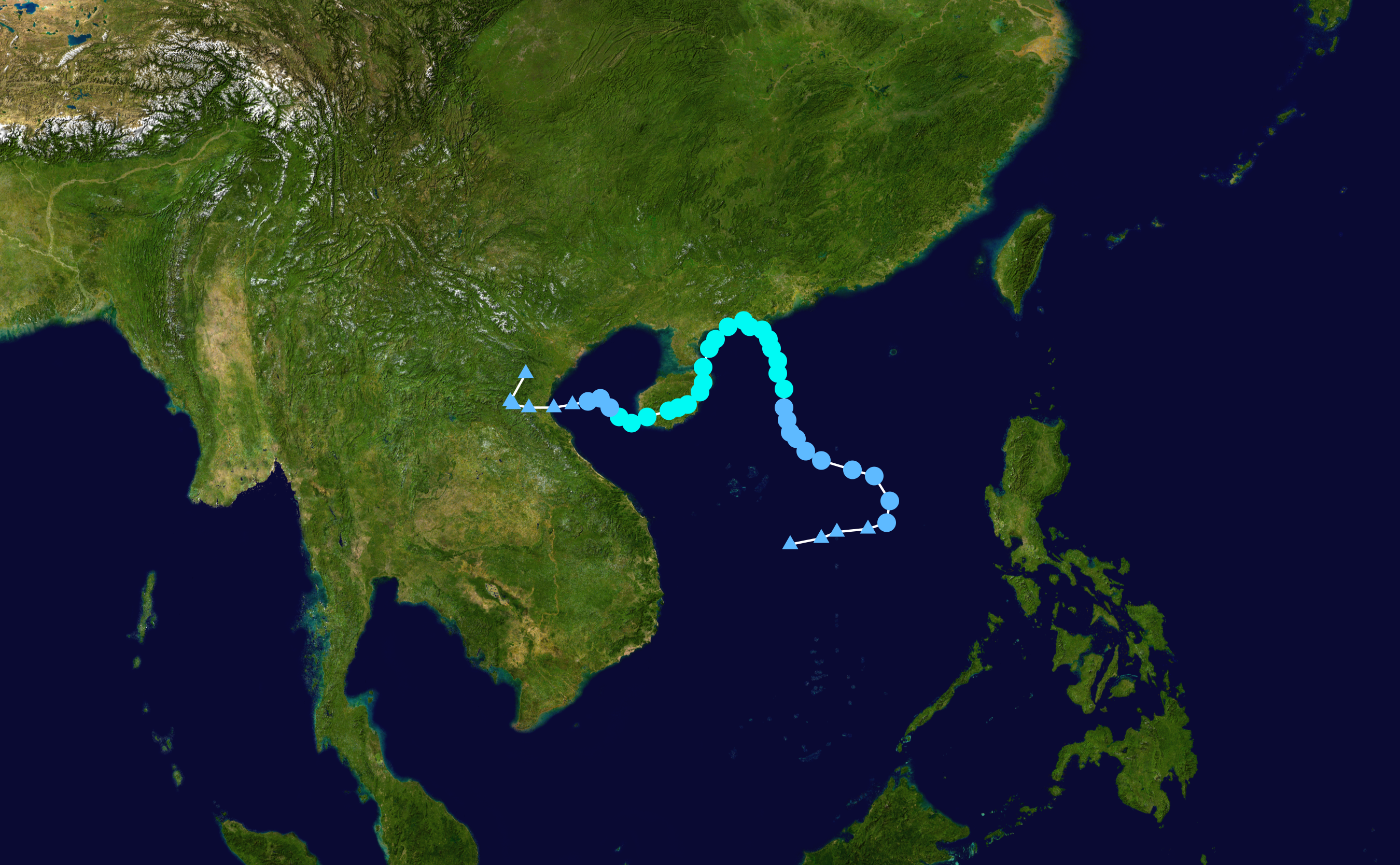
- Duration: May 26 – June 6
- Peak intensity: 90 km/h (55 mph) (1-min); 990 hPa (mbar)

Tropical Storm 04 developed in the South China Sea on May 26. It struck the Chinese province of Guangdong and Hainan, before dissipating on June 6.

=== Typhoon Rita ===
- Typhoon (JMA)
- Category 1 typhoon (SSHWS)
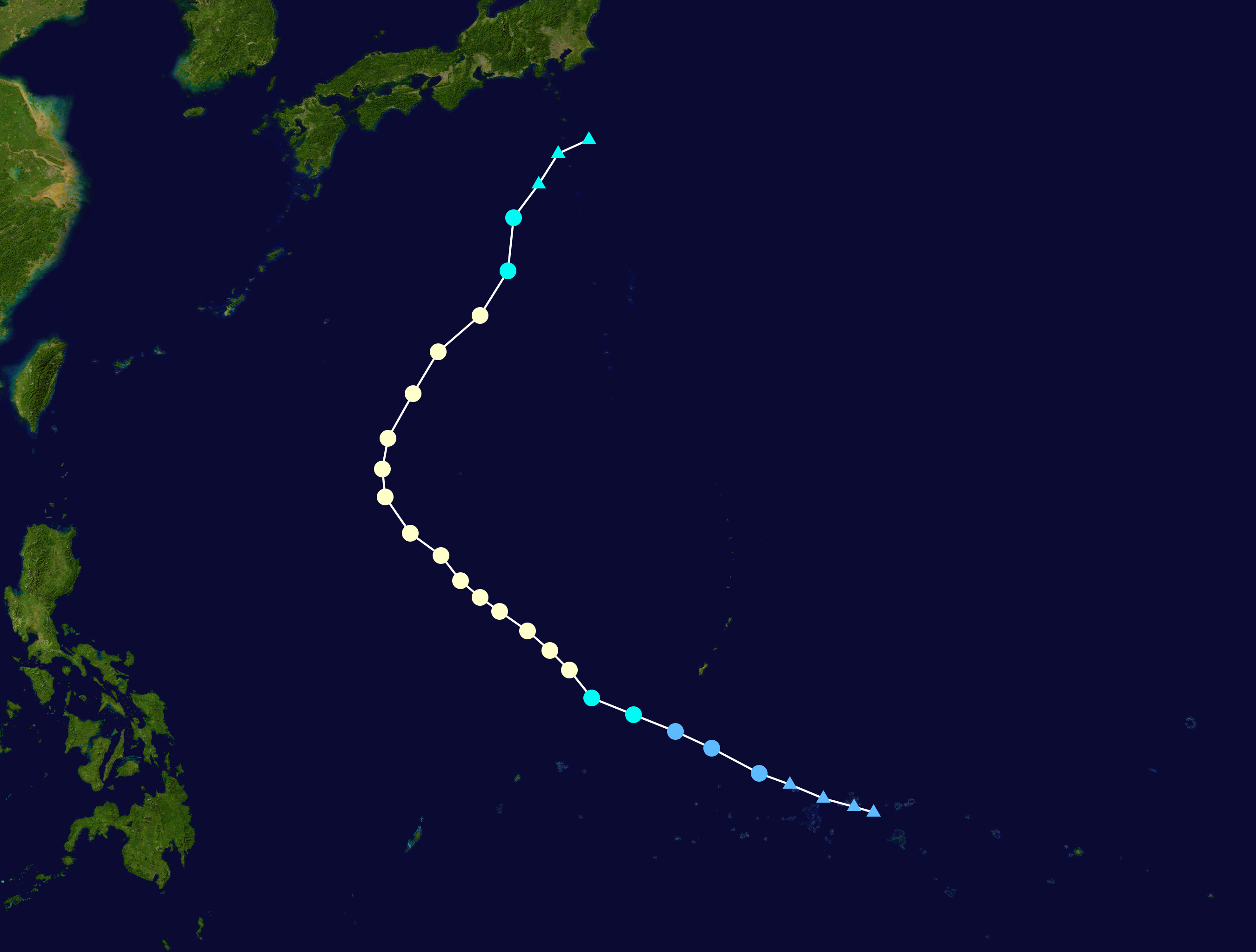
- Duration: June 7 – June 13
- Peak intensity: 140 km/h (85 mph) (1-min); 985 hPa (mbar)

Typhoon Rita existed from June 7 to June 13 in which it didn't bring any significant damage to land.

=== JMA Tropical Storm Six ===
- Tropical storm (JMA)
- Tropical storm (SSHWS)
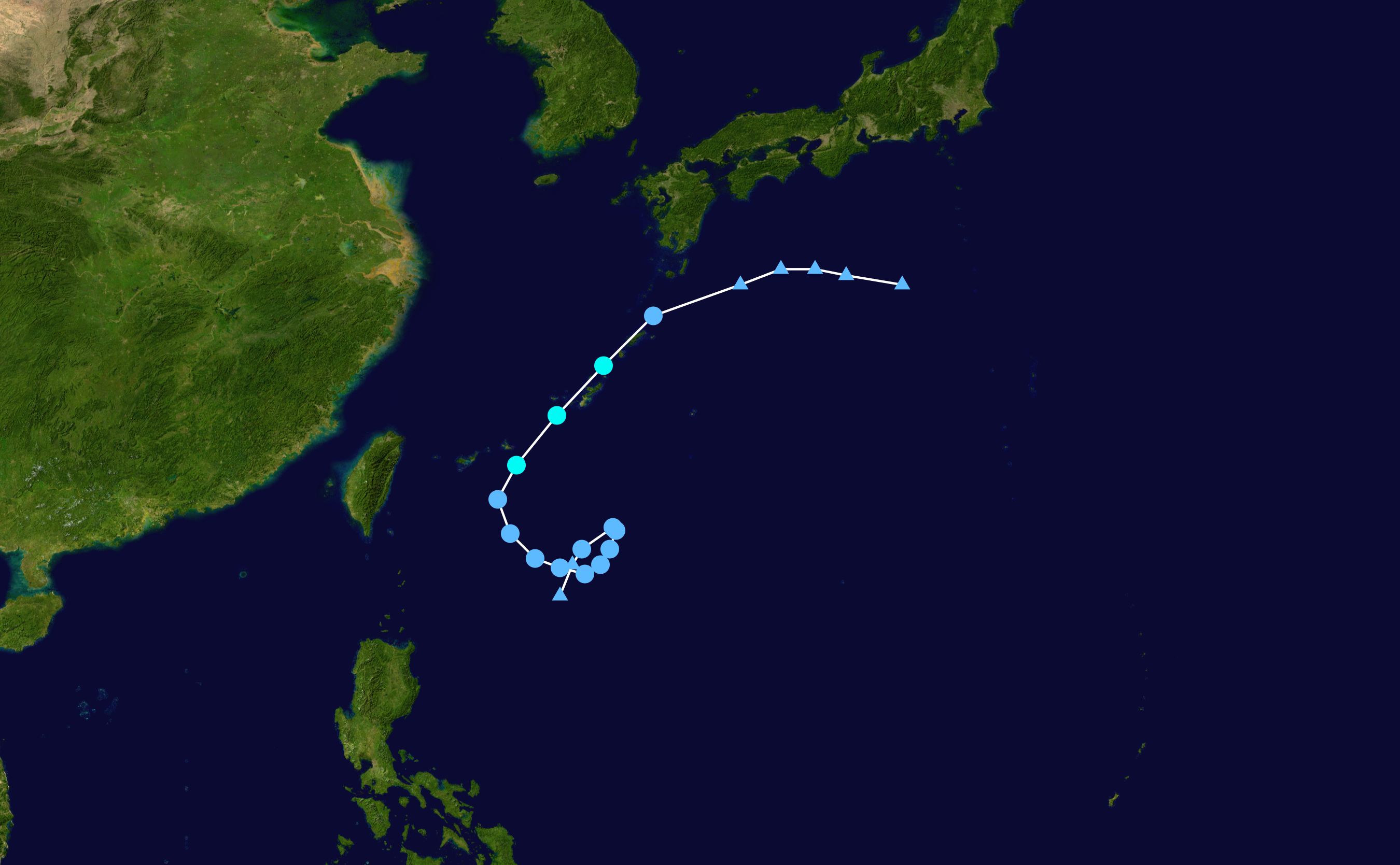
- Duration: June 8 – June 13
- Peak intensity: 70 km/h (45 mph) (1-min); 998 hPa (mbar)

Tropical Storm 06 developed on June 8. It crossed the Ryukyu Islands of Japan, before dissipating on June 13.

=== Typhoon Susan ===
- Typhoon (JMA)
- Category 3 typhoon (SSHWS)
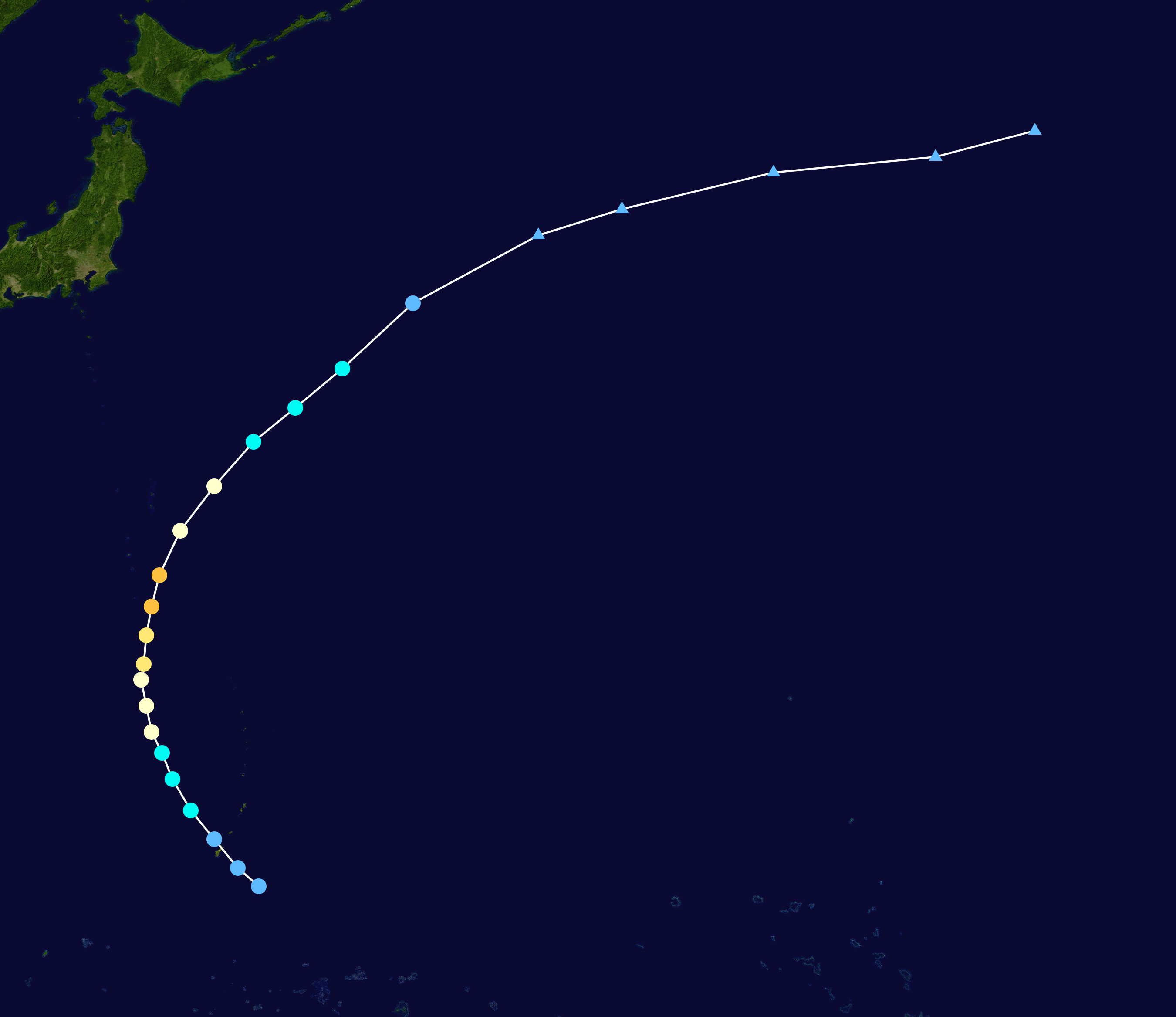
- Duration: June 13 – June 17
- Peak intensity: 185 km/h (115 mph) (1-min); 985 hPa (mbar)

Typhoon Susan existed from June 13 to June 17.

=== Typhoon Tess ===
- Typhoon (JMA)
- Category 1 typhoon (SSHWS)
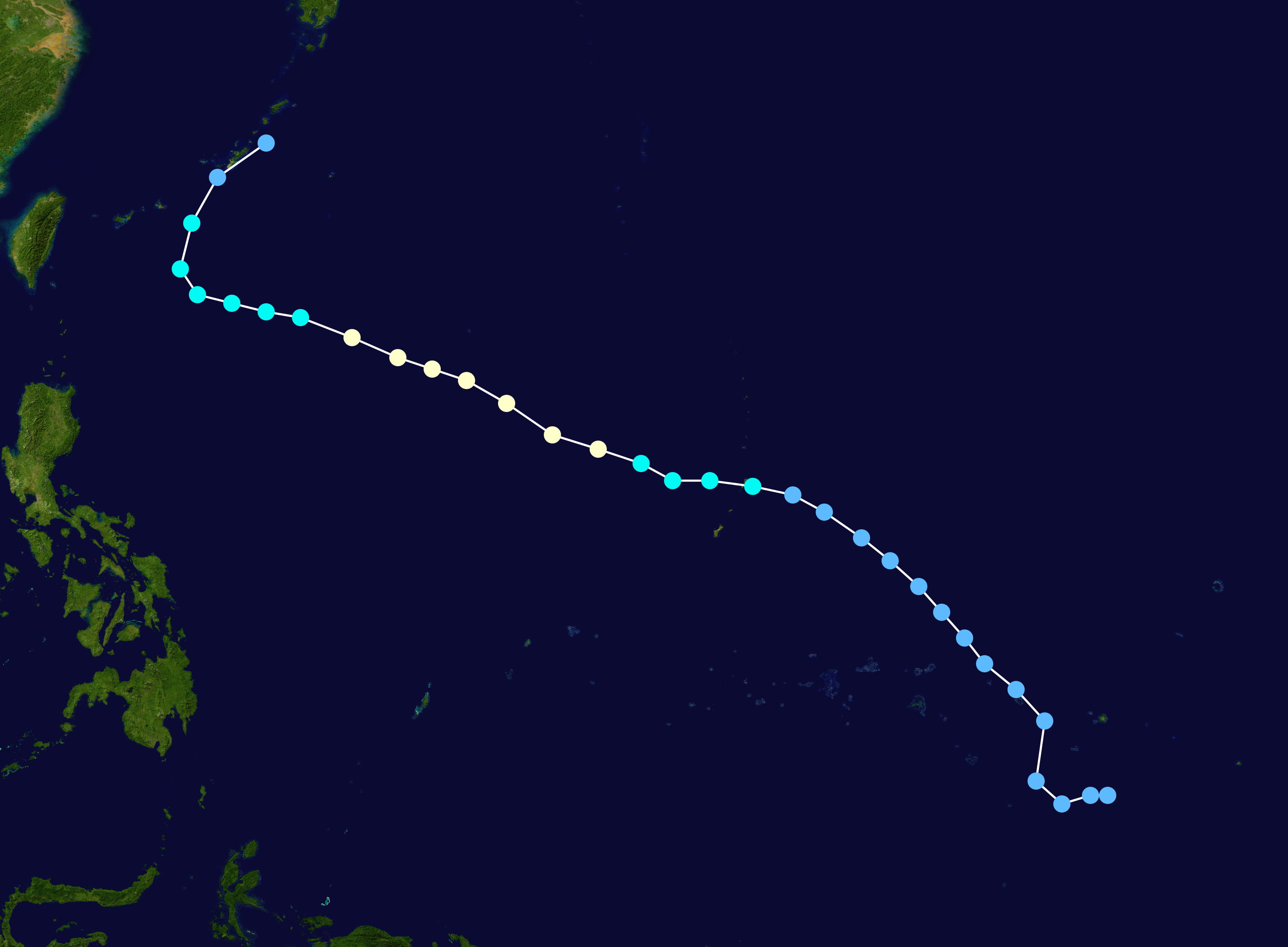
- Duration: June 28 – July 6
- Peak intensity: 140 km/h (85 mph) (1-min); 1000 hPa (mbar)

Typhoon Tess developed in the vicinity of the Federated States of Micronesia on June 28. The storm moved generally west-northwestward and northwestward, reaching the Ryukyu Islands before dissipating on July 6.

=== Typhoon Viola ===
- Typhoon (JMA)
- Category 3 typhoon (SSHWS)
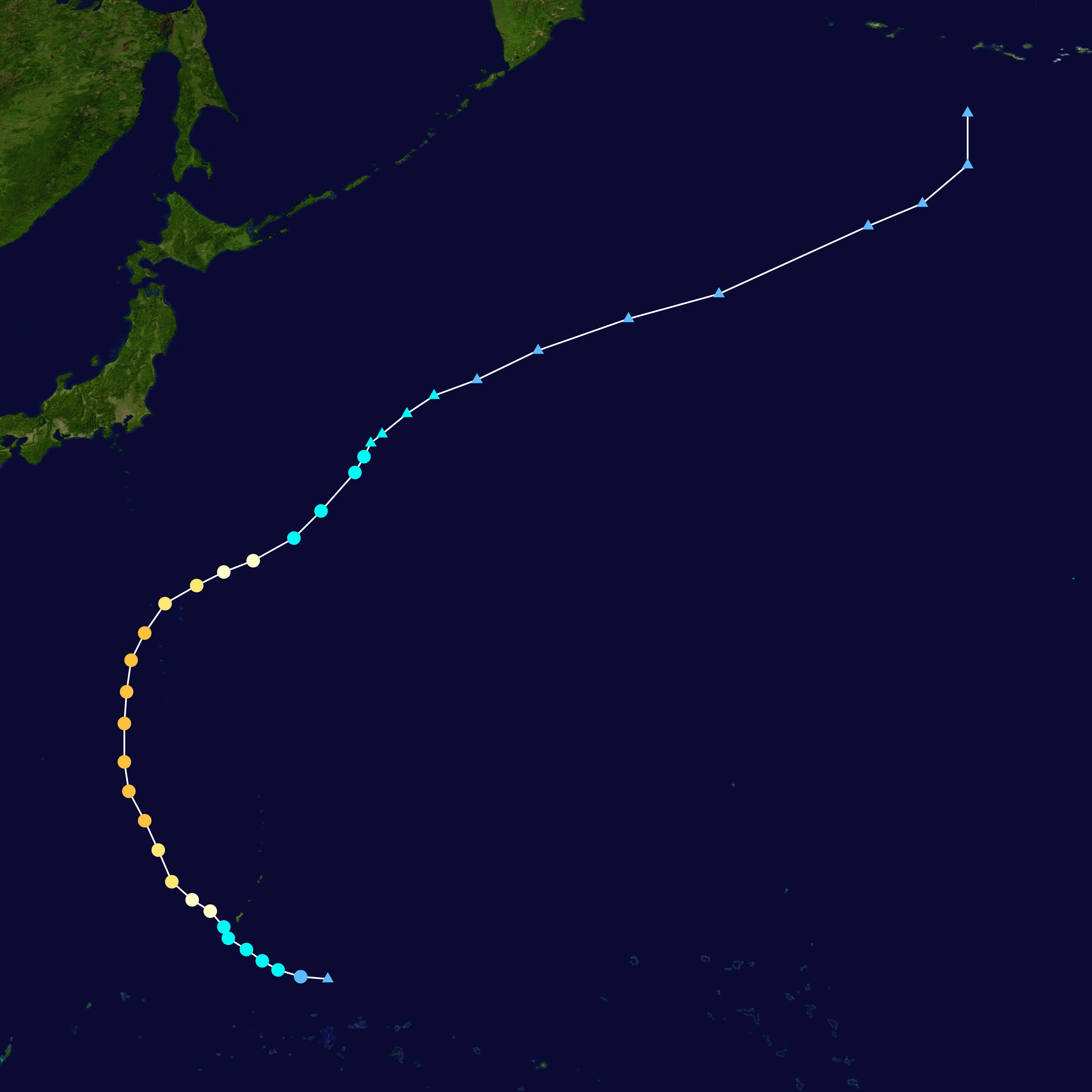
- Duration: July 8 – July 14
- Peak intensity: 185 km/h (115 mph) (1-min); 965 hPa (mbar)

Typhoon Viola existed from July 8 to July 14.

=== Super Typhoon Winnie ===
- Typhoon (JMA)
- Category 5 super typhoon (SSHWS)
- Duration: July 11 – July 17
- Peak intensity: 280 km/h (175 mph) (1-min); 925 hPa (mbar)

Tropical Storm Winnie formed on July 12 to the east of Luzon. It moved northwestward, rapidly intensifying to a Category 4 typhoon within 12 hours. The typhoon weakened slightly, but rapidly strengthened to a 175-mile-per-hour (282 km/h) super typhoon just before hitting eastern Taiwan on the 15th. Winnie rapidly weakened over the mountainous terrain, and after crossing the Formosa Strait Winnie hit southeastern China. It continued to weaken over land, and dissipated on the 17th. Winnie caused 31 casualties and 53 injuries in Taiwan while crossing.

=== Tropical Storm Betty ===
- Typhoon (JMA)
- Tropical storm (SSHWS)
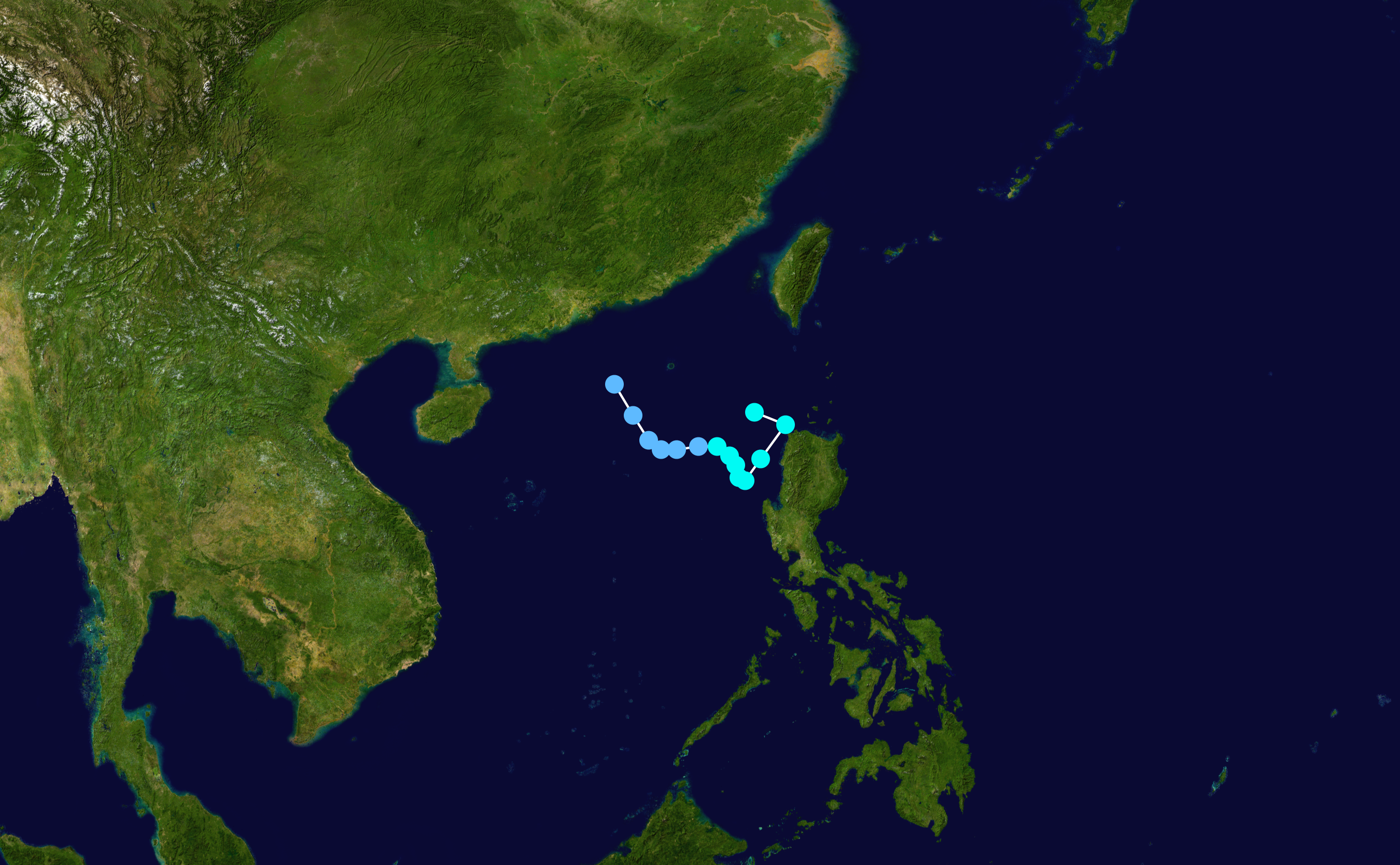
- Duration: July 13 – July 16
- Peak intensity: 110 km/h (70 mph) (1-min); 985 hPa (mbar)

Tropical Storm Betty existed in the South China Sea from July 13 to July 16.

=== Super Typhoon Alice ===
- Typhoon (JMA)
- Category 4 super typhoon (SSHWS)
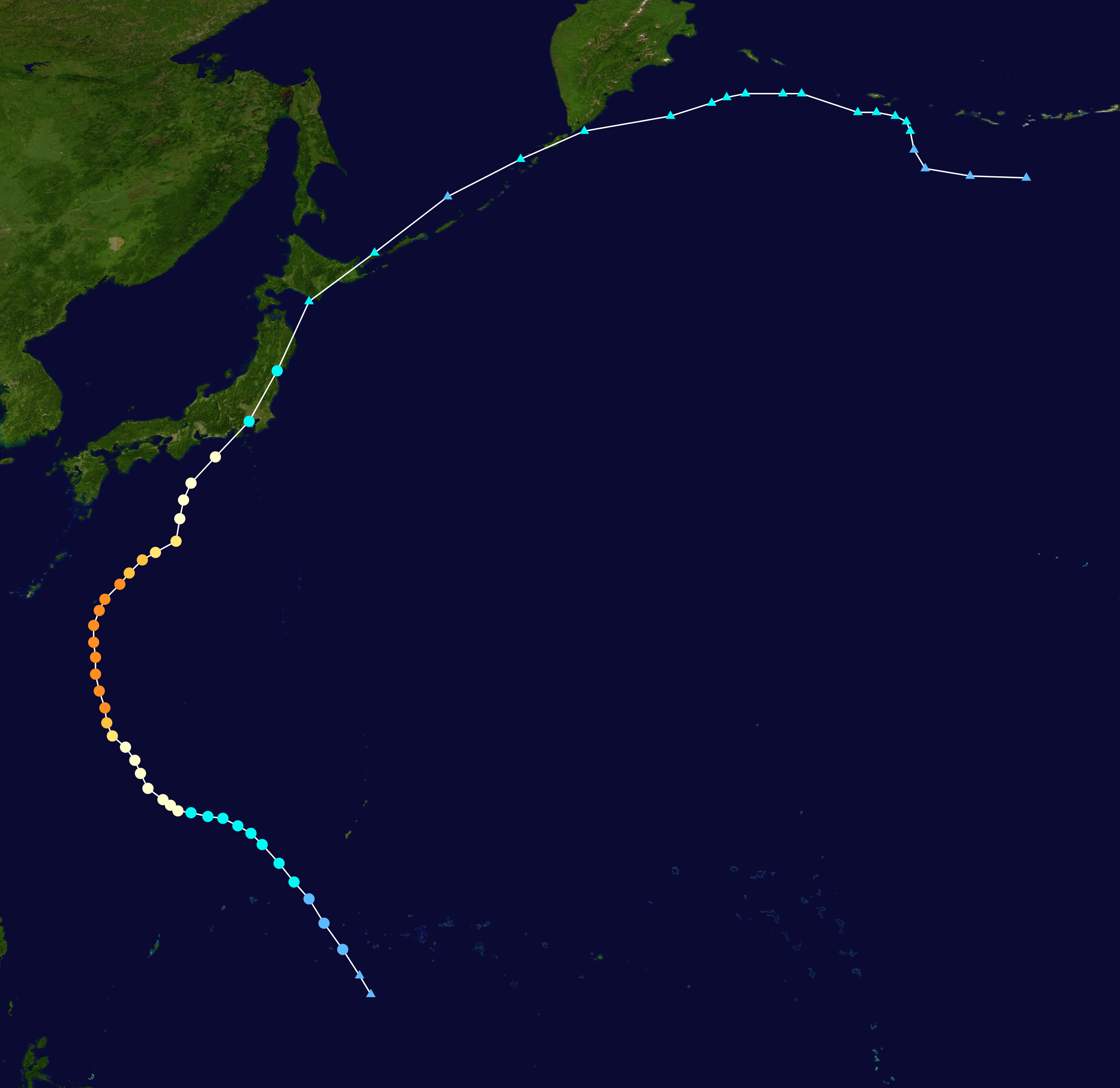
- Duration: July 13 – July 24
- Peak intensity: 240 km/h (150 mph) (1-min); 925 hPa (mbar)

Tropical Storm Alice developed on July 14 in the open western Pacific Ocean. It moved to the northwest and attained typhoon status on the 16th. Alice rapidly intensified on the 19th to a 150-mile-per-hour (240 km/h) super typhoon, and after turning to the northeast it weakened. Alice hit southeastern Japan on the 22nd, and became extratropical on the 24th near the Kamchatka Peninsula.

Shortly after Typhoon Alice made landfall, storm surges occurred in Tokyo Bay, causing floods in Kōtō and Edogawa on Shitamachi region. In the area of Kameido (now a station), storm surge in Tokyo Bay reached 2.89 meters in height. Storm surges caused flooding of rivers around Tokyo Bay that damaged 21 ships, damaged 27,673 hectare of crops, destroyed 1,089 and inundated 46,243 houses. Alice caused the deaths of 26 people in total, injuring 64 people and 14 people went missing.

=== JMA Tropical Storm Fourteen ===
- Tropical storm (JMA)
- Tropical storm (SSHWS)
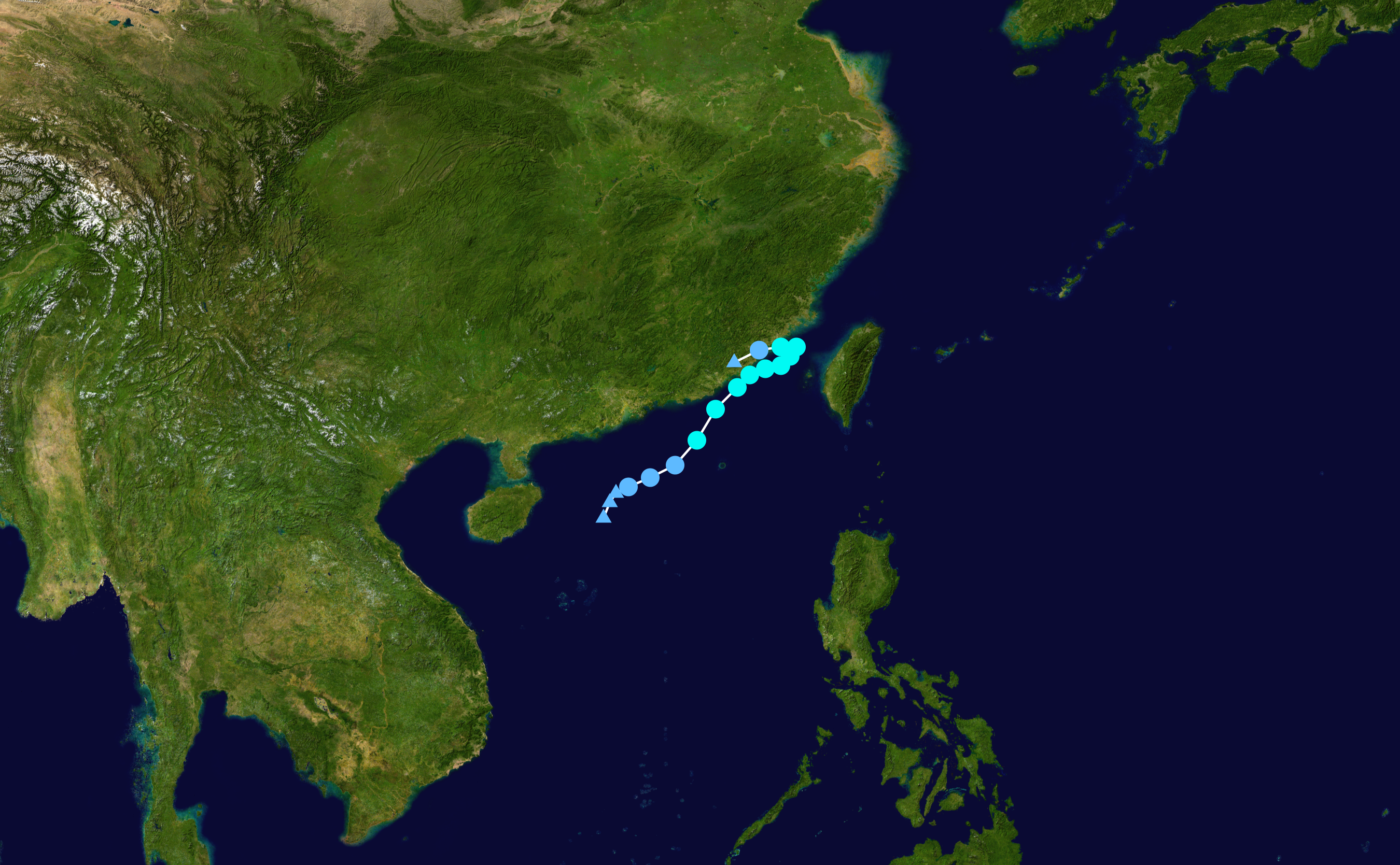
- Duration: July 19 – July 25
- Peak intensity: 95 km/h (60 mph) (1-min); 992 hPa (mbar)

Tropical Storm Fourteen developed in the South China Sea on July 19. It struck Fujian before dissipating on July 25.

=== Super Typhoon Doris ===
- Typhoon (JMA)
- Category 4 super typhoon (SSHWS)
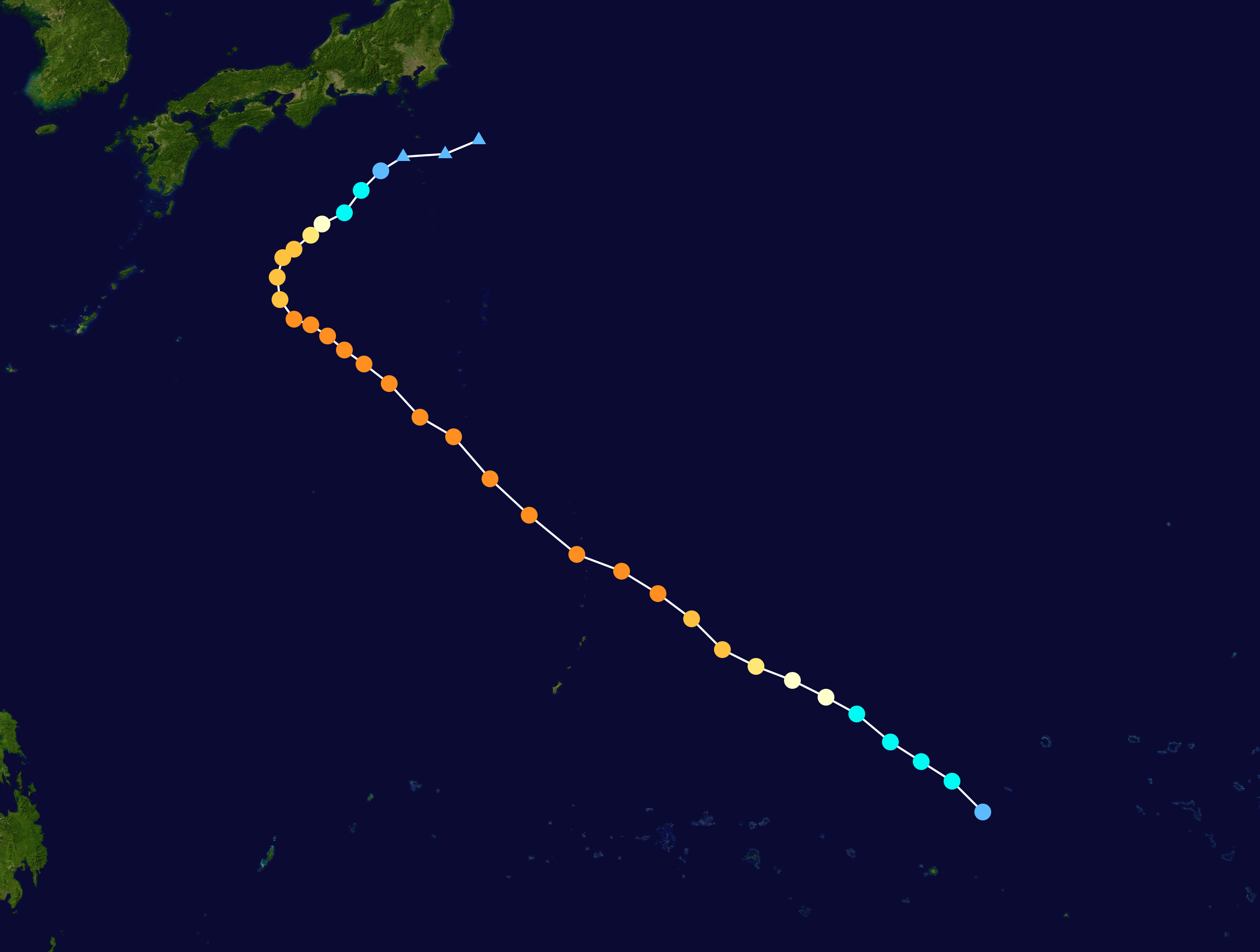
- Duration: July 22 – July 29
- Peak intensity: 240 km/h (150 mph) (1-min); 935 hPa (mbar)

Typhoon Doris existed from July 22 to July 29.

=== JMA Tropical Storm Sixteen ===
- Tropical storm (JMA)
- Category 1 typhoon (SSHWS)
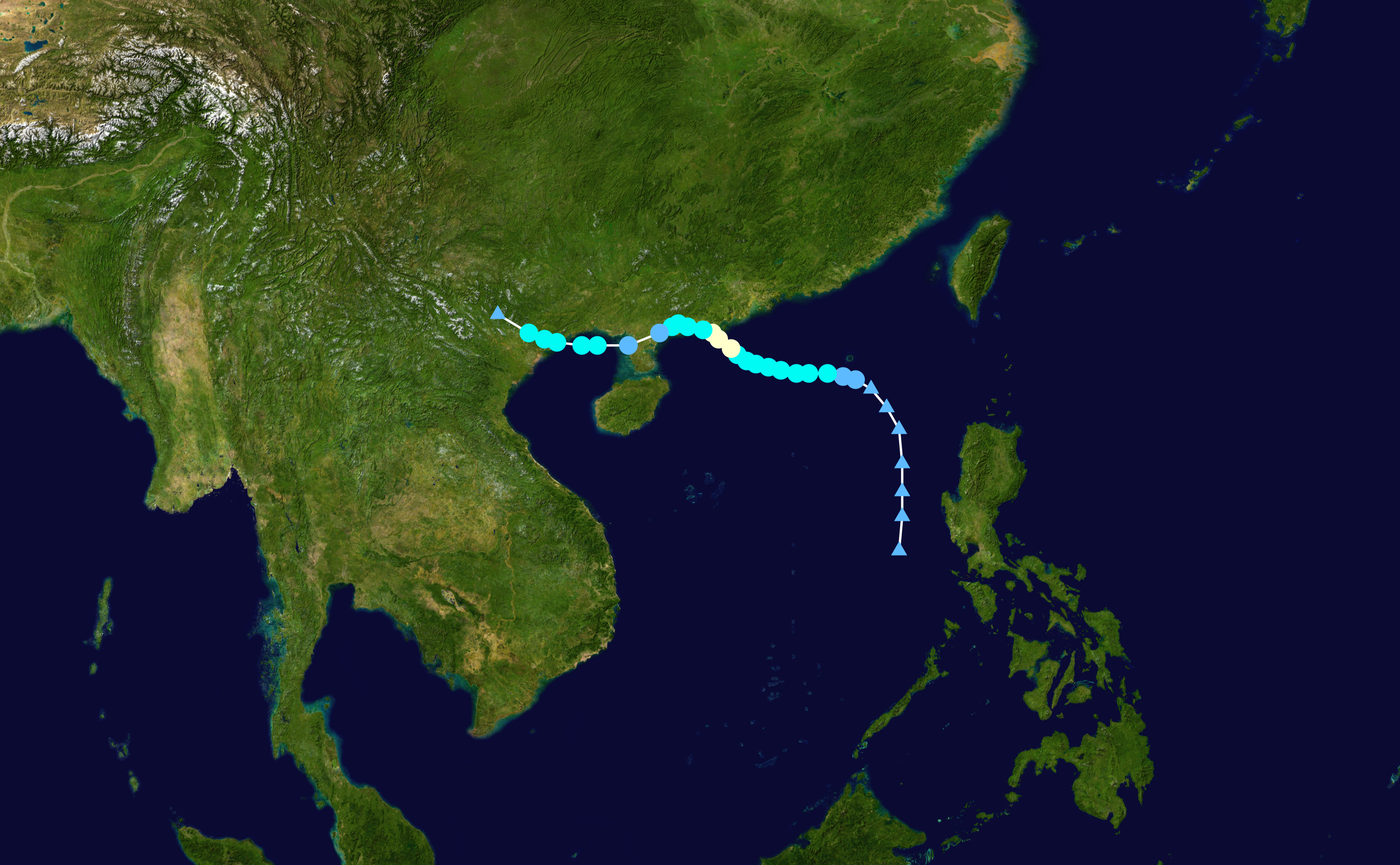
- Duration: August 5 – August 11
- Peak intensity: 145 km/h (90 mph) (1-min); 995 hPa (mbar)

Typhoon 16 developed in the South China Sea on August 5. It struck China before dissipating on August 11.

=== Typhoon Elsie ===
- Typhoon (JMA)
- Category 1 typhoon (SSHWS)
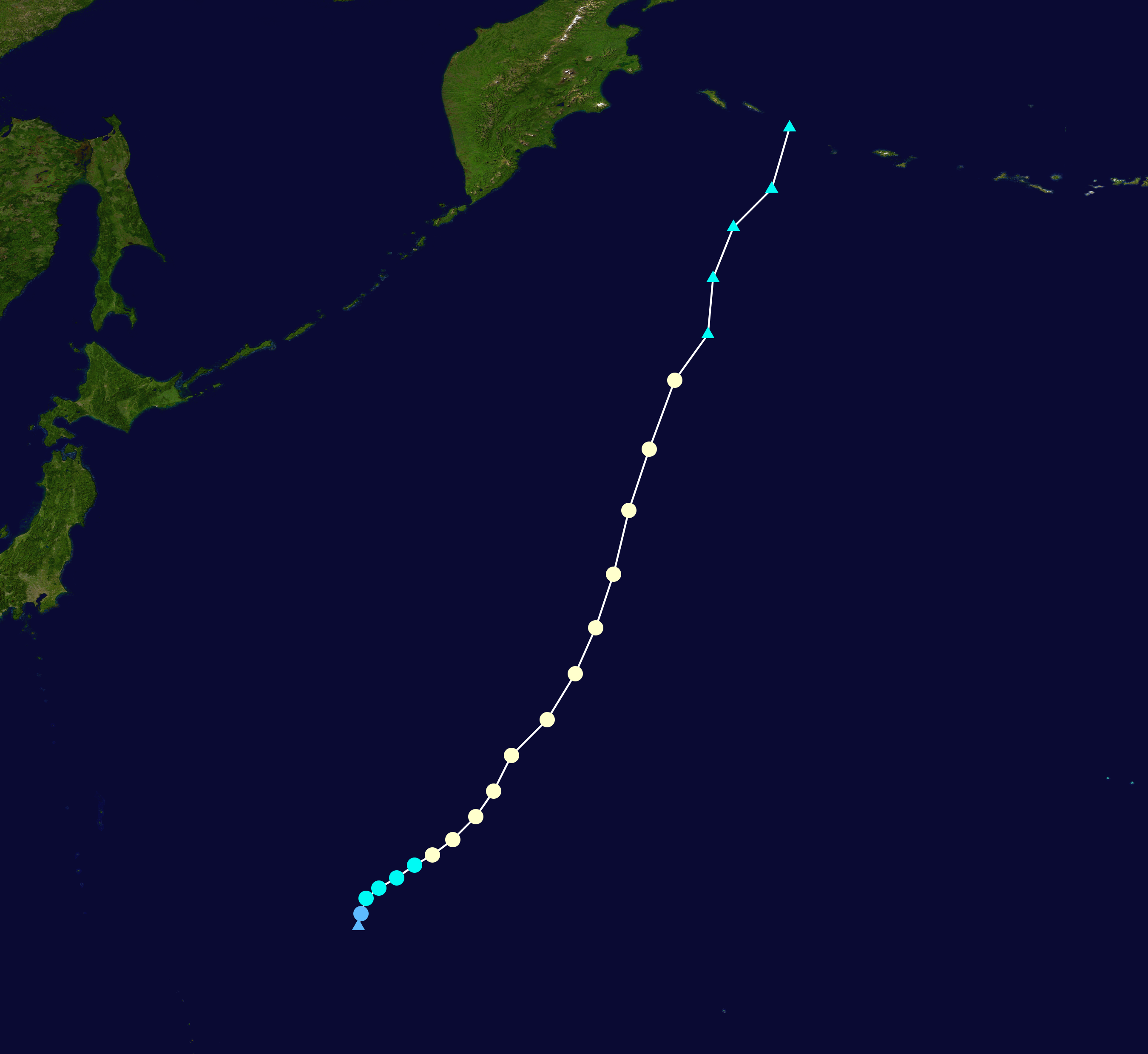
- Duration: August 4 – August 9
- Peak intensity: 140 km/h (85 mph) (1-min); 965 hPa (mbar)

Typhoon Elsie existed from August 4 to August 9.

=== Typhoon Flossie ===
- Typhoon (JMA)
- Category 2 typhoon (SSHWS)
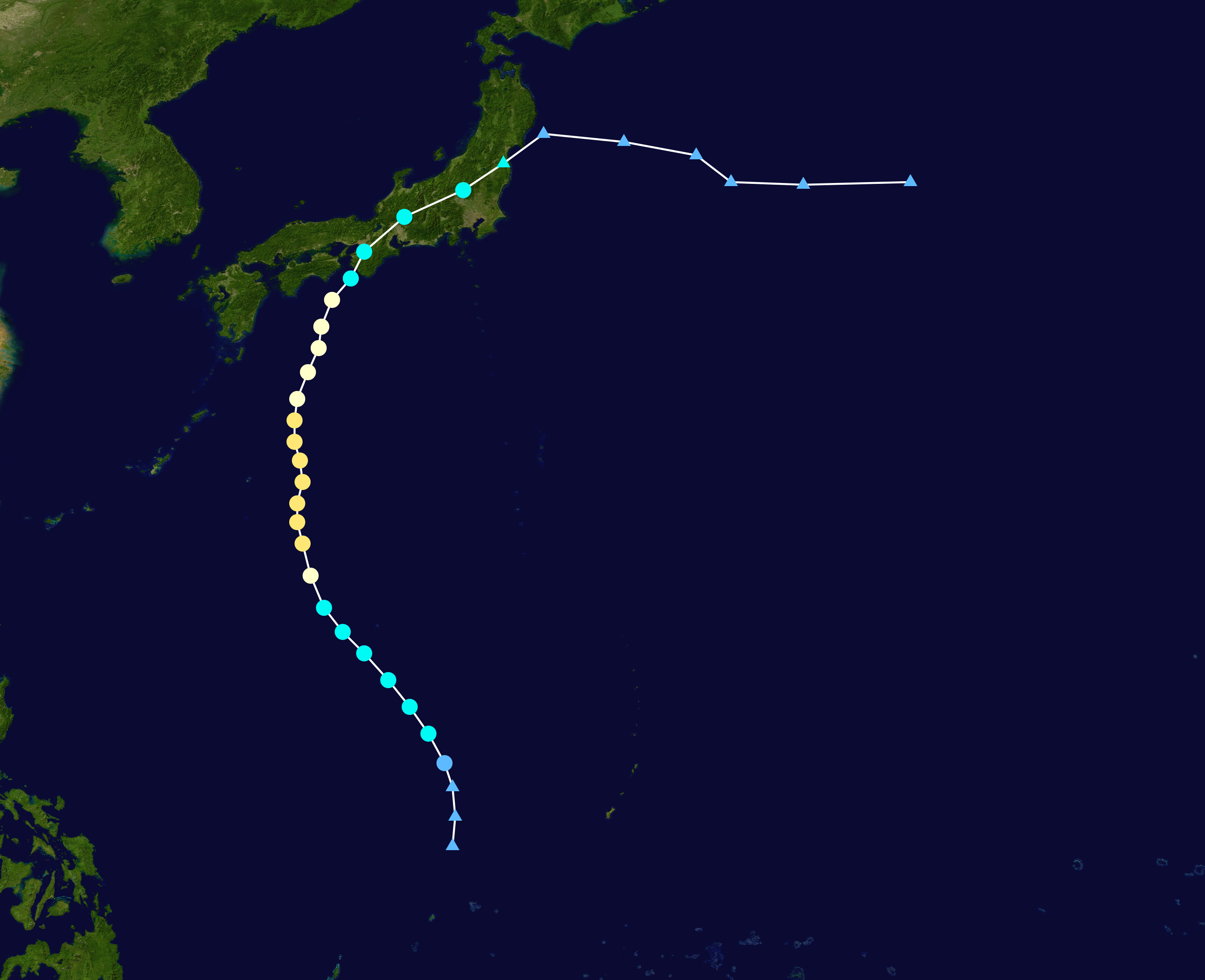
- Duration: August 21 – August 26
- Peak intensity: 165 km/h (105 mph) (1-min); 970 hPa (mbar)

On August 21, a tropical depression formed in the open ocean and moved northward. It reached tropical storm status later that day, and attained typhoon strength on the 22nd. Flossie peaked at 105 miles per hour (169 km/h) on the 22nd, and weakened to a 70-mile-per-hour (110 km/h) tropical storm just before hitting the southeastern coast of Japan on the 25th. Flossie turned to the east, and after becoming extratropical on the 26th the storm dissipated on the 27th. The storm caused 15 casualties (with 30 missing) and 39 injuries in Tokyo.

=== JMA Tropical Storm Eighteen ===
- Tropical storm (JMA)
- Tropical storm (SSHWS)
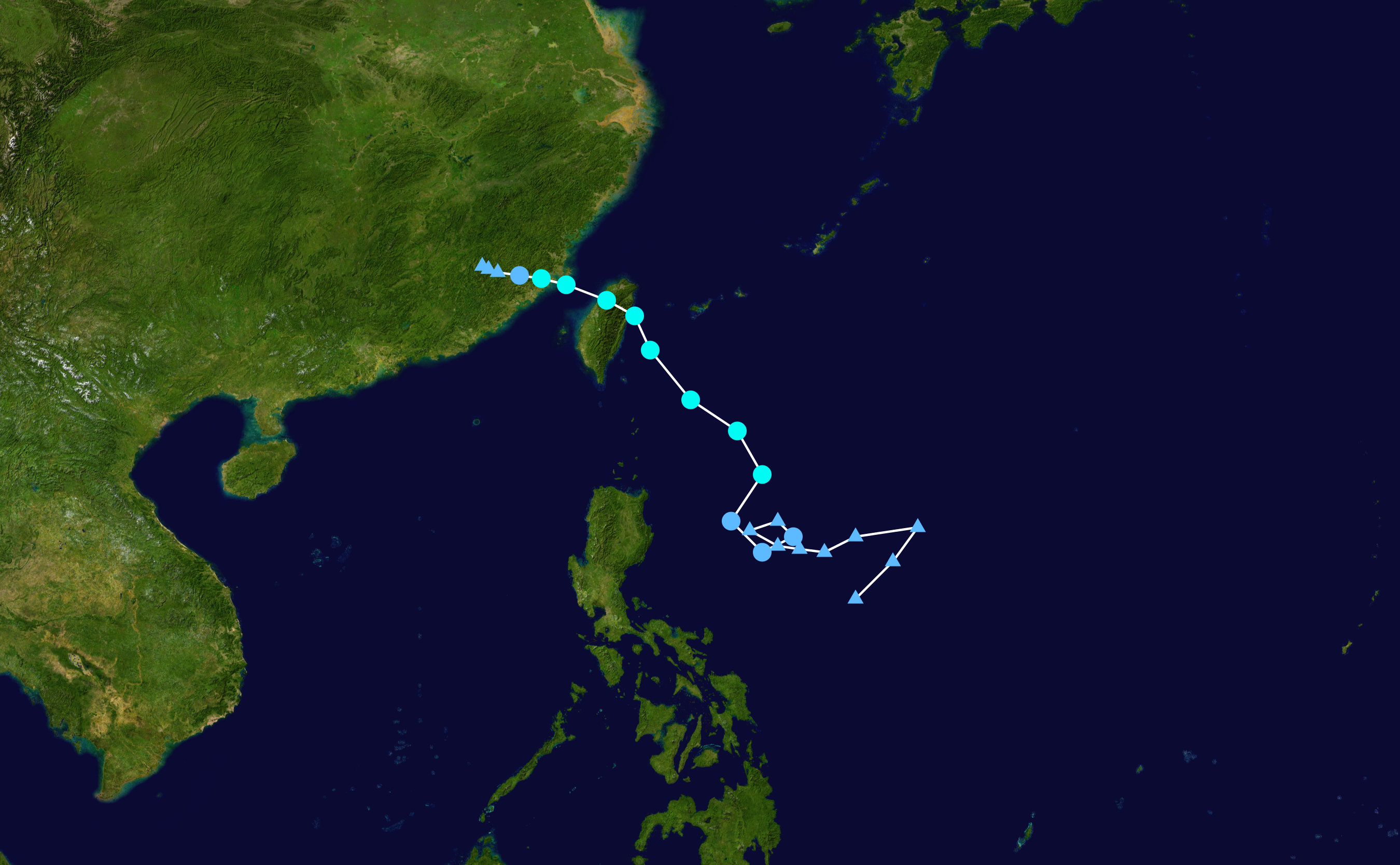
- Duration: August 25 – August 31
- Peak intensity: 105 km/h (65 mph) (1-min); 994 hPa (mbar)

Tropical Storm 18 existed from August 25 to August 31.

=== Super Typhoon Grace ===
- Typhoon (JMA)
- Category 5 super typhoon (SSHWS)
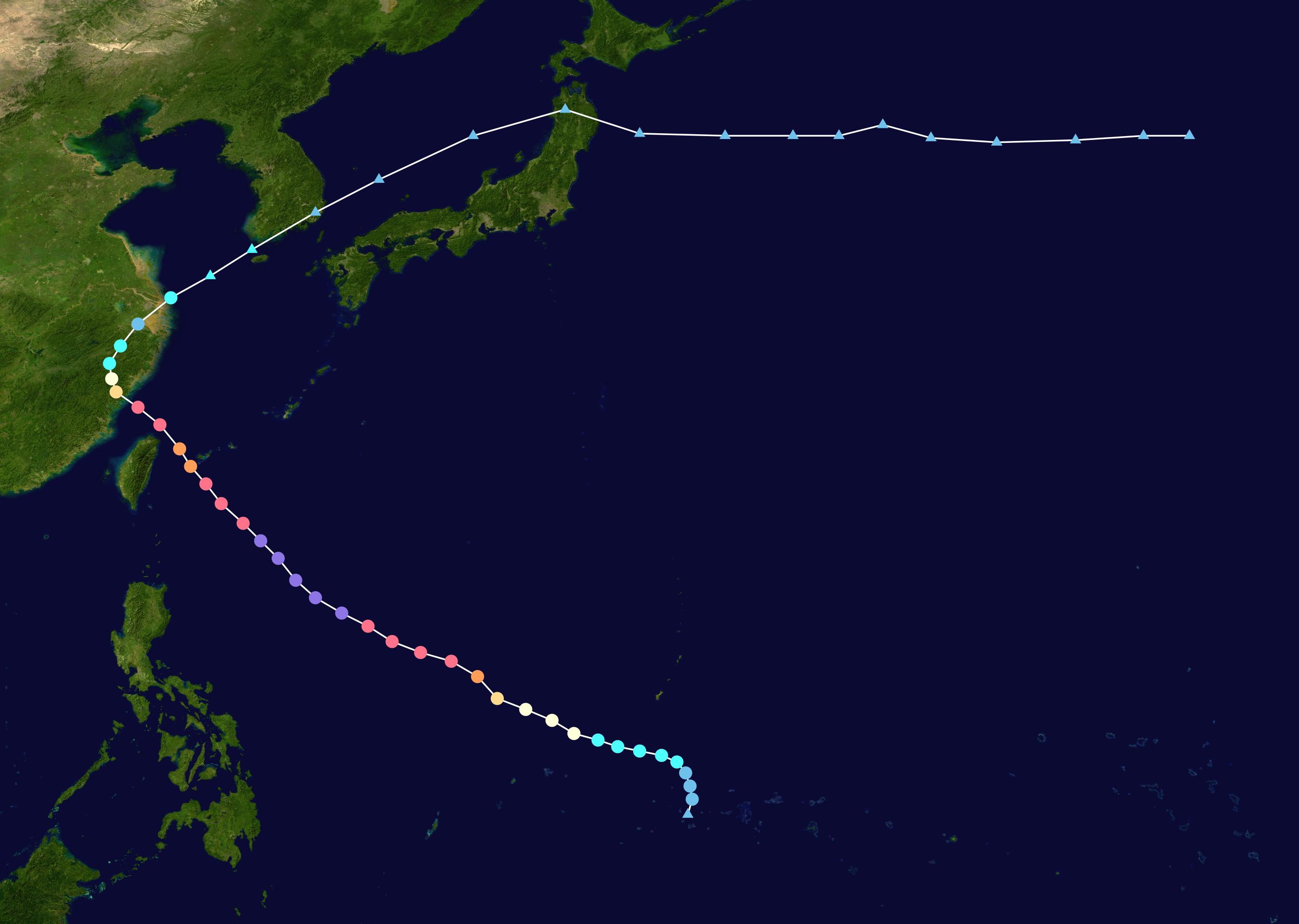
- Duration: August 27 – September 10
- Peak intensity: 305 km/h (190 mph) (1-min); 897 hPa (mbar)

Another typhoon developed in the vicinity of the Federated States of Micronesia on August 29. The system moved northwestward and eventually strengthened into a super typhoon. Grace peaked with a minimum barometric pressure of 905 mbar (26.7 inHg). It later struck Zhejiang before becoming extratropical on September 5.

=== JMA Tropical Storm Twenty ===
- Tropical storm (JMA)
- Tropical storm (SSHWS)
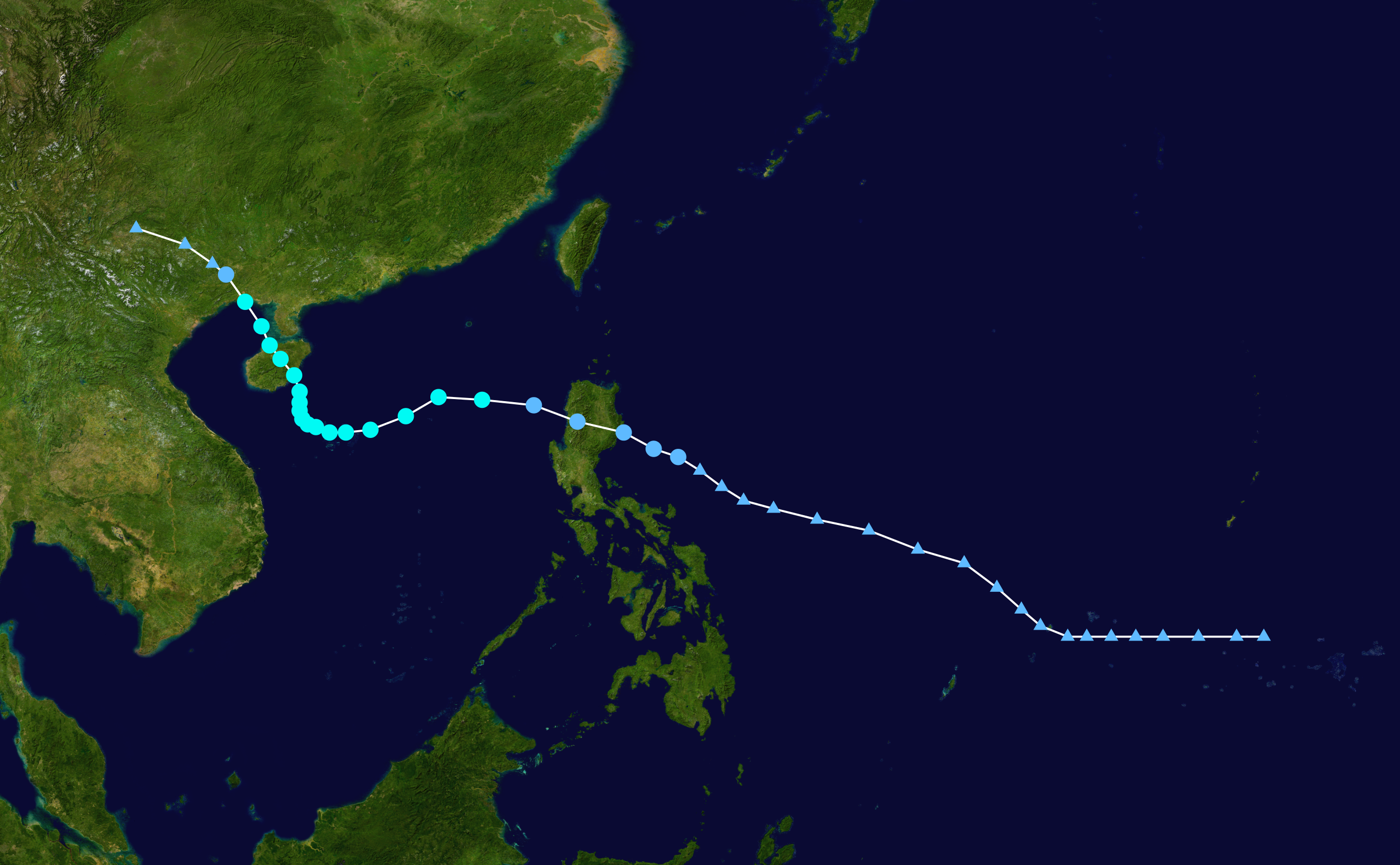
- Duration: September 2 – September 13
- Peak intensity: 105 km/h (65 mph) (1-min); 986 hPa (mbar)

Tropical Storm 24 existed from September 2 to September 13.

=== Super Typhoon Helen ===
- Typhoon (JMA)
- Category 5 super typhoon (SSHWS)
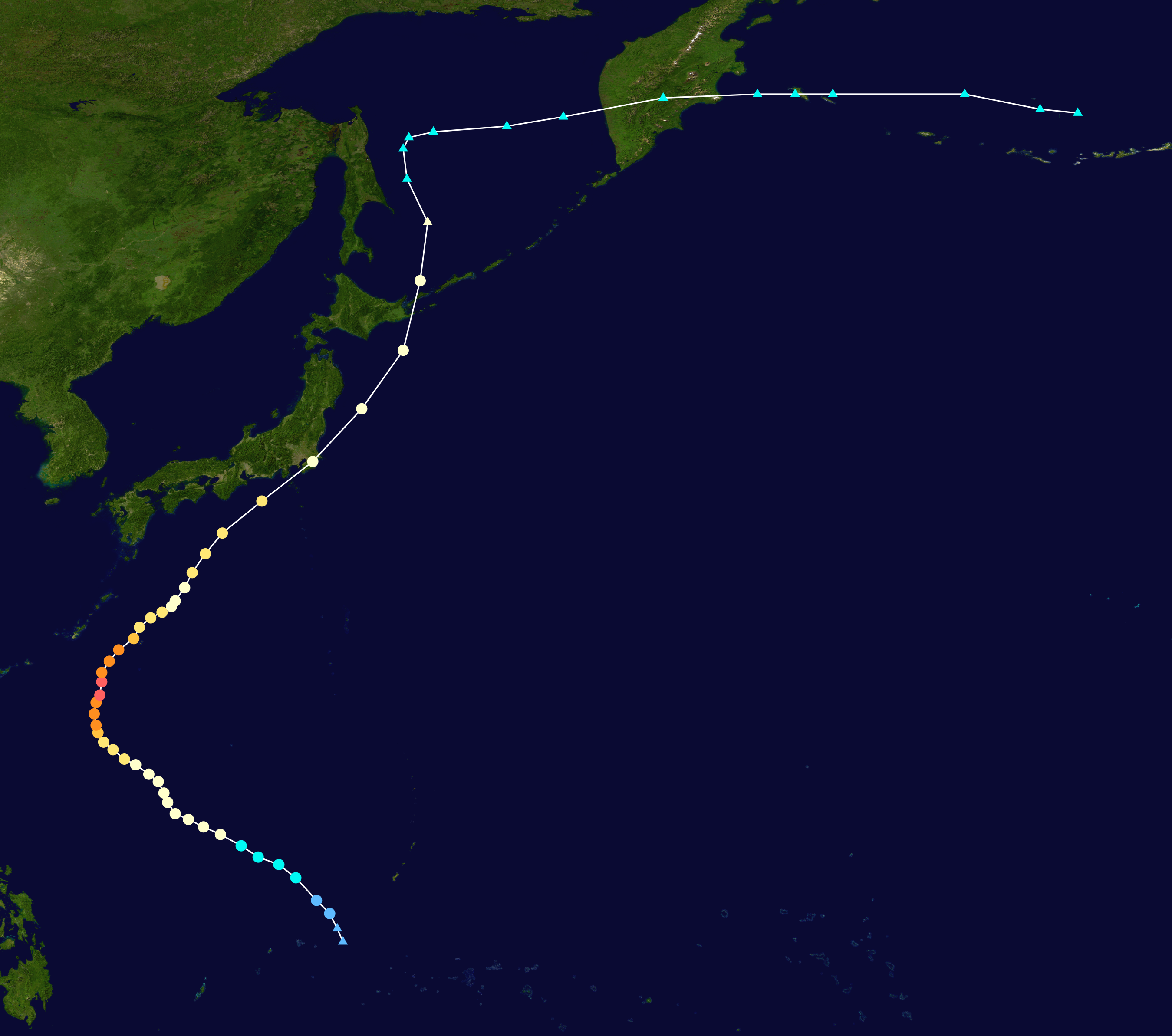
- Duration: September 9 – September 20
- Peak intensity: 280 km/h (175 mph) (1-min); 920 hPa (mbar)

Typhoon Helen, which formed on September 9, rapidly intensified to a 175-mile-per-hour (282 km/h) super typhoon on the 14th. It moved to the northeast, and steadily weakened until hitting southeastern Japan as a 105-mile-per-hour (169 km/h) typhoon on the 17th. It paralleled the Japanese coastline, and after turning northward it became extratropical on the 19th in the Sea of Okhotsk. Helen's effects caused 24 fatalities (with 44 missing) and 108 injuries.

=== Super Typhoon Ida ===
- Typhoon (JMA)
- Category 5 super typhoon (SSHWS)
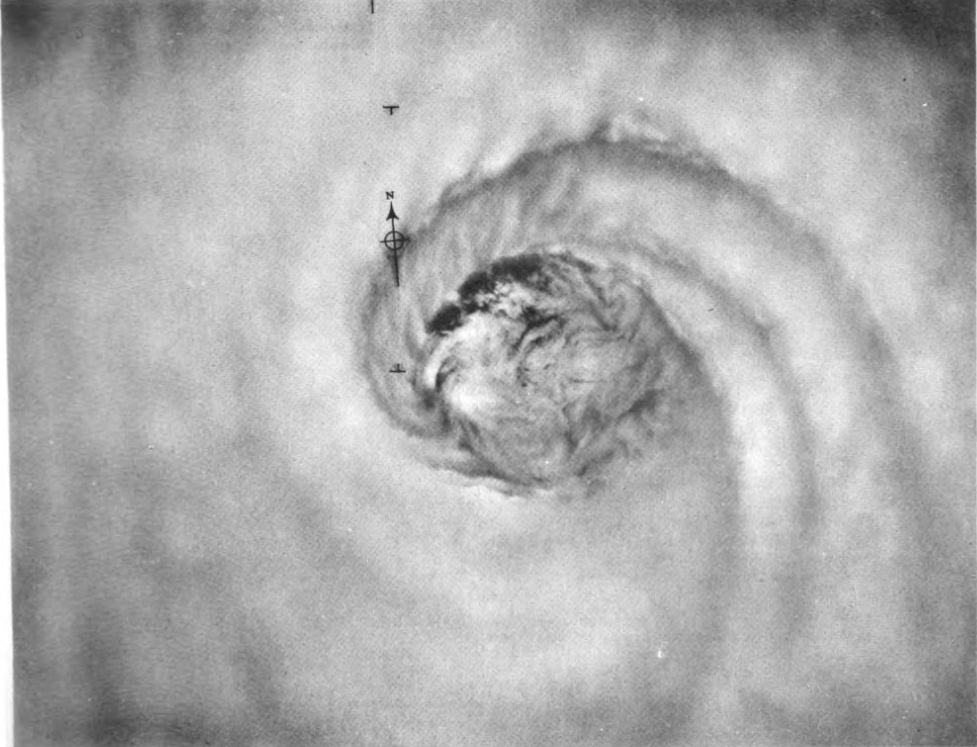
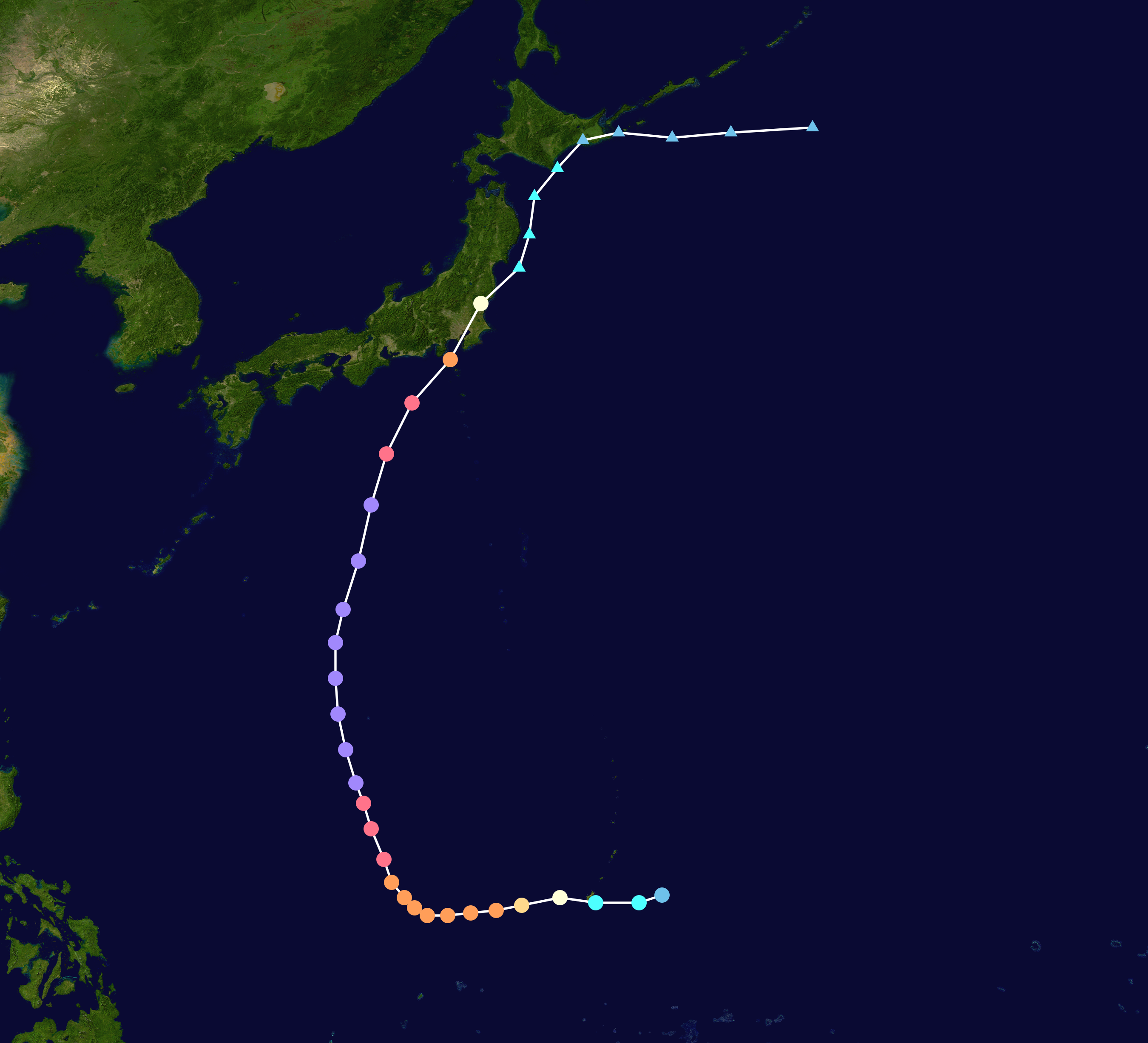
- Duration: September 20 – September 27
- Peak intensity: 325 km/h (200 mph) (1-min); 877 hPa (mbar)

On September 20, Tropical Storm Ida formed in the central Western Pacific. It moved to the west, rapidly strengthening to a 115-mile-per-hour (185 km/h) typhoon by the next day. On the 22nd Ida turned to the north and quickly intensified, reaching super typhoon status on the 23rd and peak winds of 200 miles per hour (320 km/h) on the 24th. Such winds are speculative, due to the lack of satellite or quality in measurements, but Ida was likely a formidable typhoon with a record low pressure (at the time) of 877 mbar. Ida weakened as it continued to the north-northeast, and made landfall on southeastern Honshū with winds of 80 miles per hour (130 km/h) on the 26th. It became extratropical the next day, and dissipated on the 28th to the east of the country. Ida caused torrential flooding to southeastern Japan, resulting in over 1,900 mudslides. Damage along the coastline was extensive, including two small villages that were washed away completely. Nearly 500,000 were left homeless, 888 were killed, 496 were injured, and 381 were missing from the storm.

=== Typhoon June ===
- Typhoon (JMA)
- Category 1 typhoon (SSHWS)
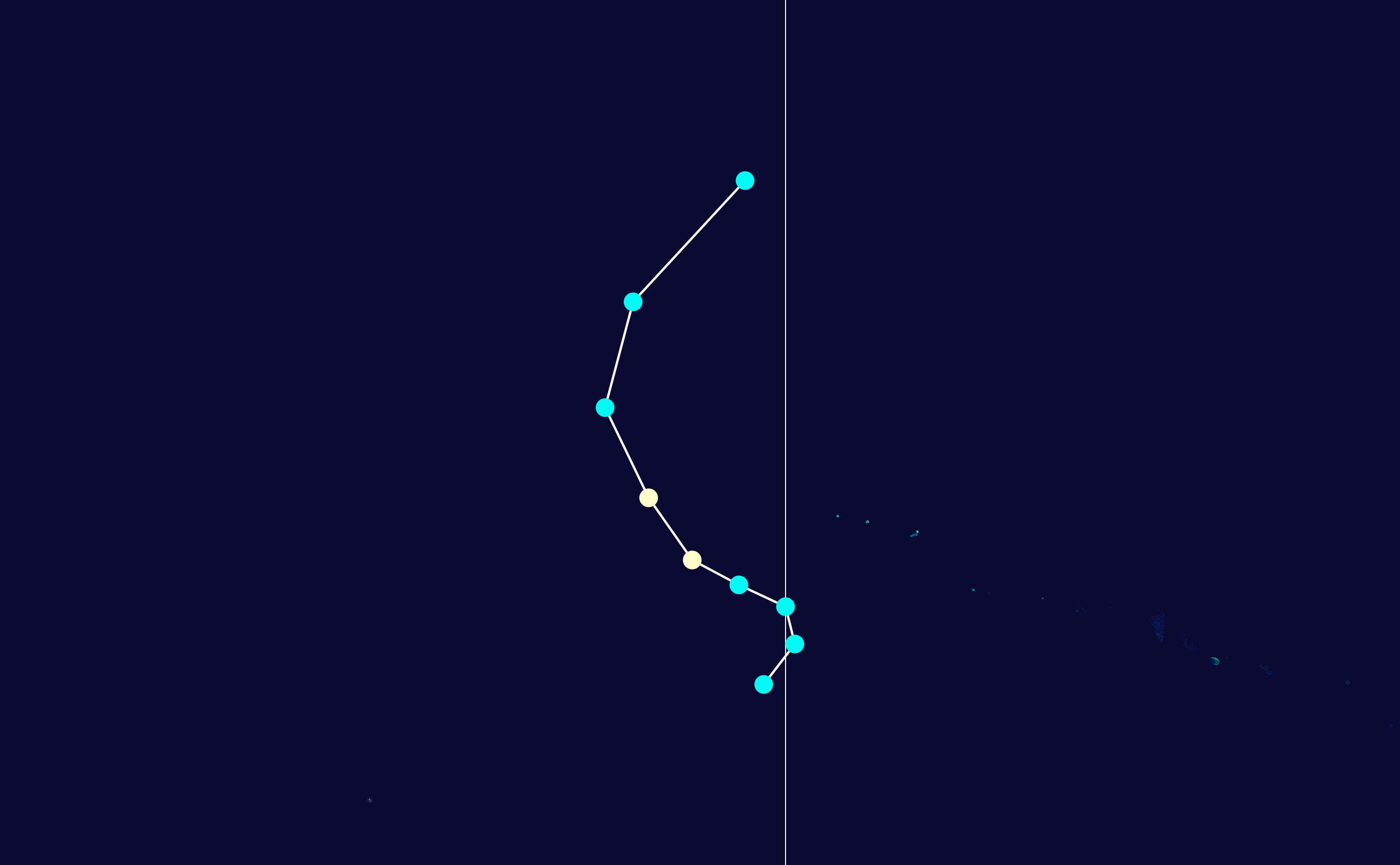
- Duration: September 20 – September 22
- Peak intensity: 120 km/h (75 mph) (1-min); 990 hPa (mbar)

Typhoon June existed from September 20 to September 22. Its track was somewhat similar to Hurricane Patsy in the 1959 Pacific hurricane season.

=== JMA Tropical Storm Twenty-four ===
- Tropical storm (JMA)
- Tropical storm (SSHWS)
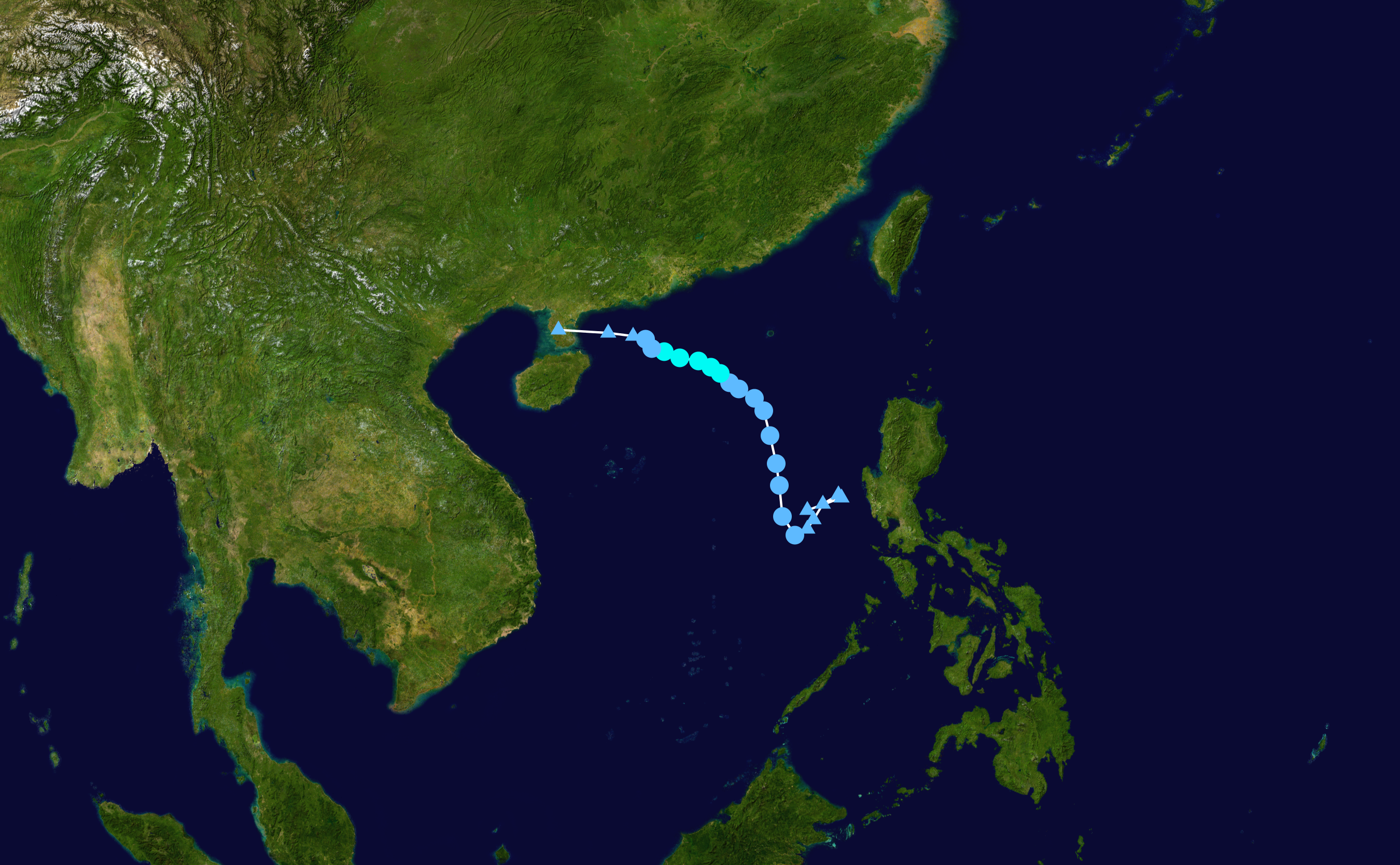
- Duration: September 24 – September 29
- Peak intensity: 70 km/h (45 mph) (1-min); 1000 hPa (mbar)

Tropical Storm 24 existed from September 24 to September 29.

=== Typhoon Kathy ===
- Typhoon (JMA)
- Category 3 typhoon (SSHWS)
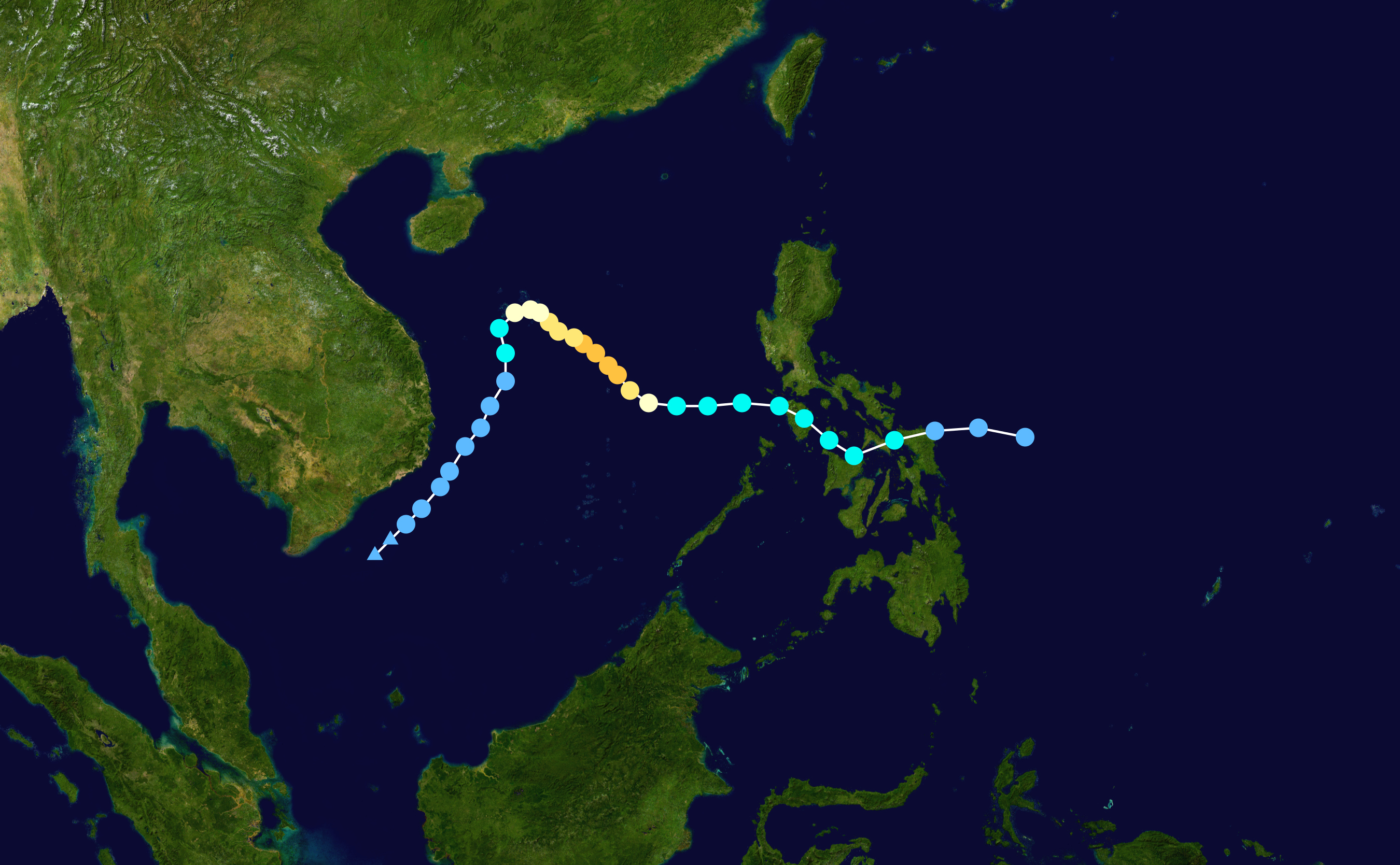
- Duration: October 21 – October 27
- Peak intensity: 185 km/h (115 mph) (1-min); 975 hPa (mbar)

Typhoon Kathy developed just east of the Philippines on October 21. It moved across the islands and entered the South China Sea. There, the system strengthened, and subsequently dissipated on October 27.

=== Typhoon Lorna ===
- Typhoon (JMA)
- Category 3 typhoon (SSHWS)
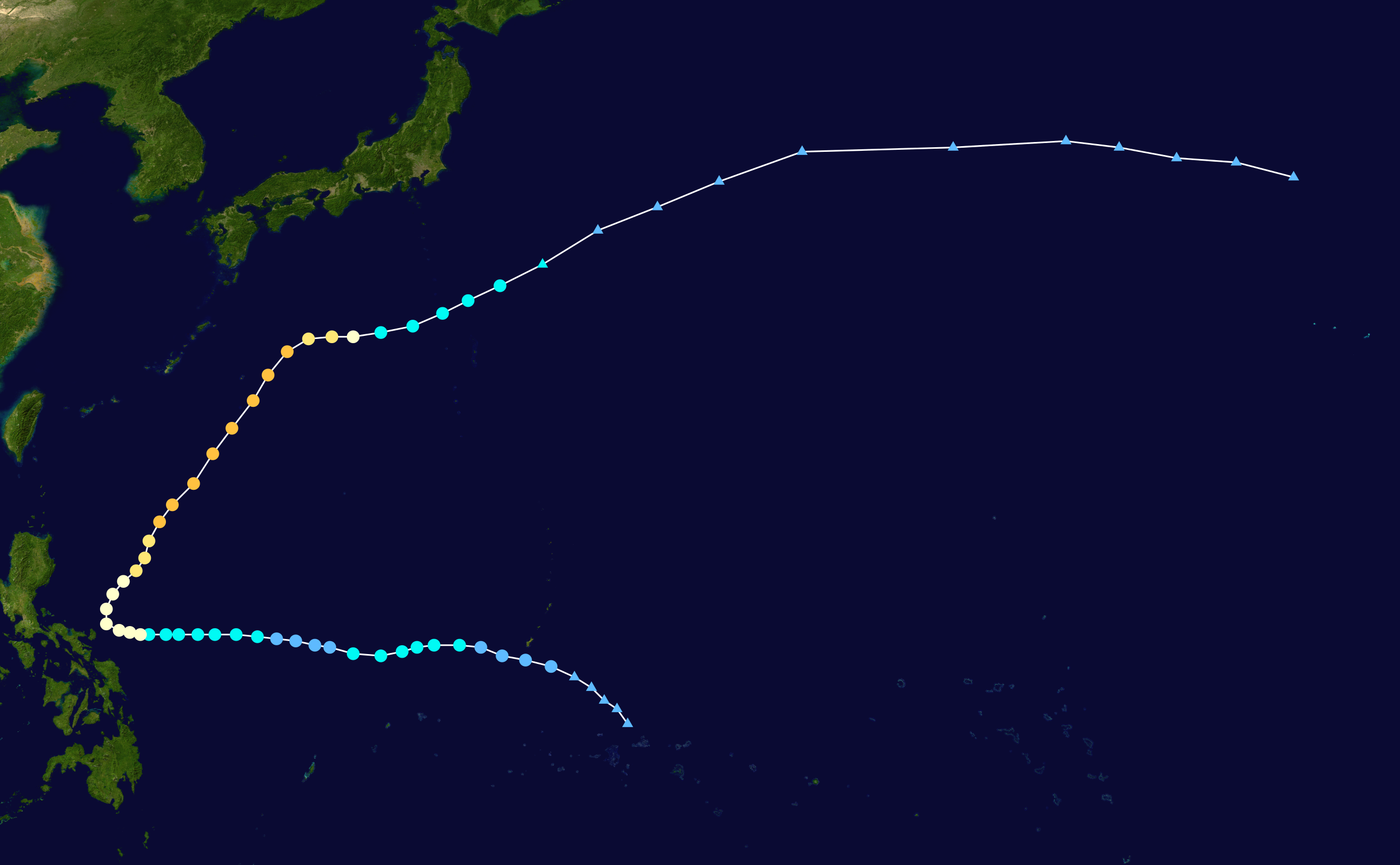
- Duration: October 23 – November 3
- Peak intensity: 205 km/h (125 mph) (1-min); 940 hPa (mbar)

Typhoon Lorna existed from October 23 to November 3.

=== Typhoon Marie ===
- Typhoon (JMA)
- Category 4 typhoon (SSHWS)
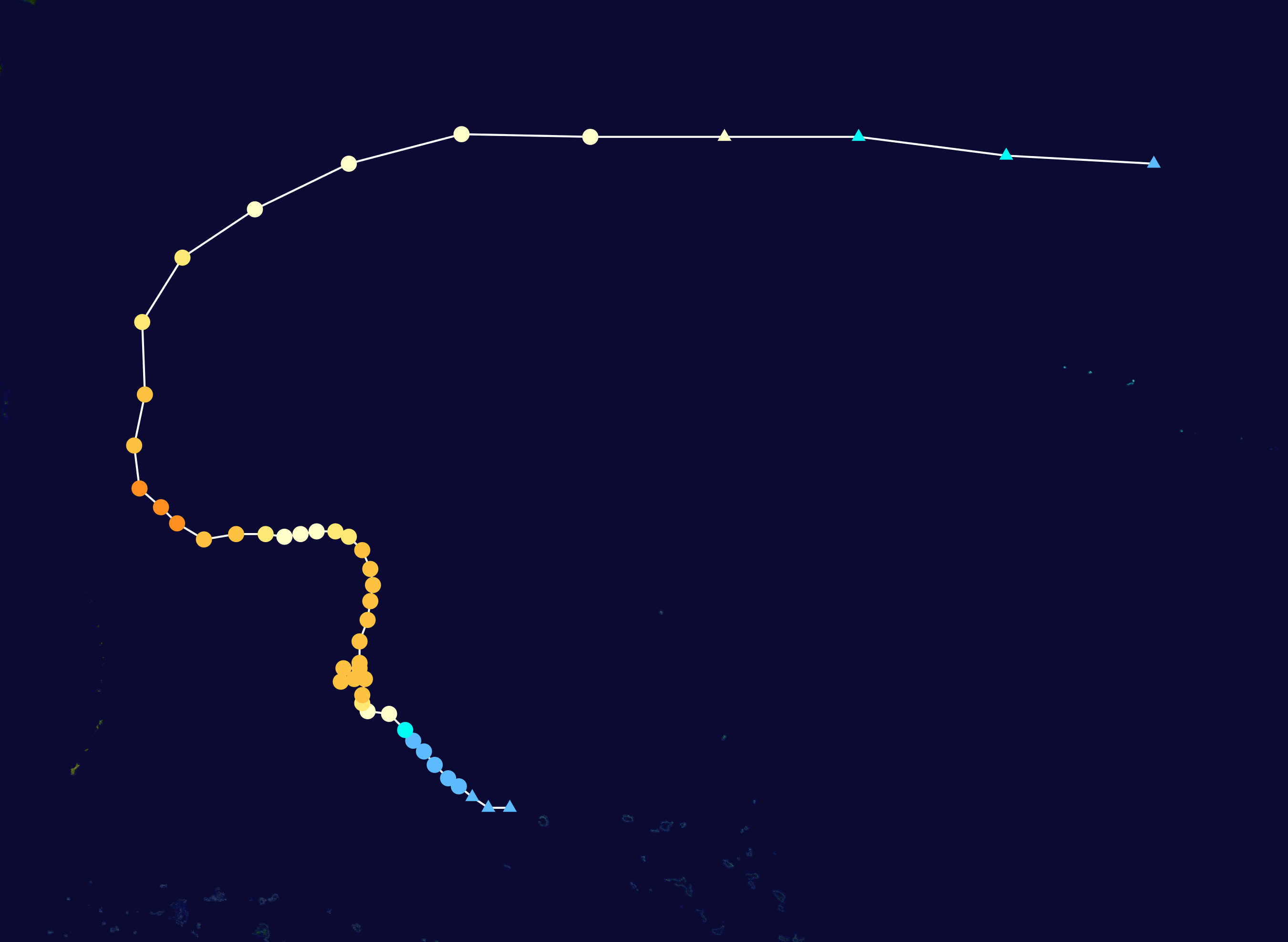
- Duration: October 26 – November 3
- Peak intensity: 220 km/h (140 mph) (1-min); 940 hPa (mbar)

Typhoon Marie existed from October 26 to November 3.

=== Super Typhoon Nancy ===
- Typhoon (JMA)
- Category 5 super typhoon (SSHWS)
- Duration: November 21 – November 26
- Peak intensity: 260 km/h (160 mph) (1-min); 920 hPa (mbar)

Typhoon Nancy developed near Palau on November 21. The system strengthened into a super typhoon, peaking with a minimum barometric pressure of 920 mbar (27 inHg). Nancy dissipated on November 26.

=== Tropical Storm Pamela ===
- Tropical storm (JMA)
- Tropical storm (SSHWS)
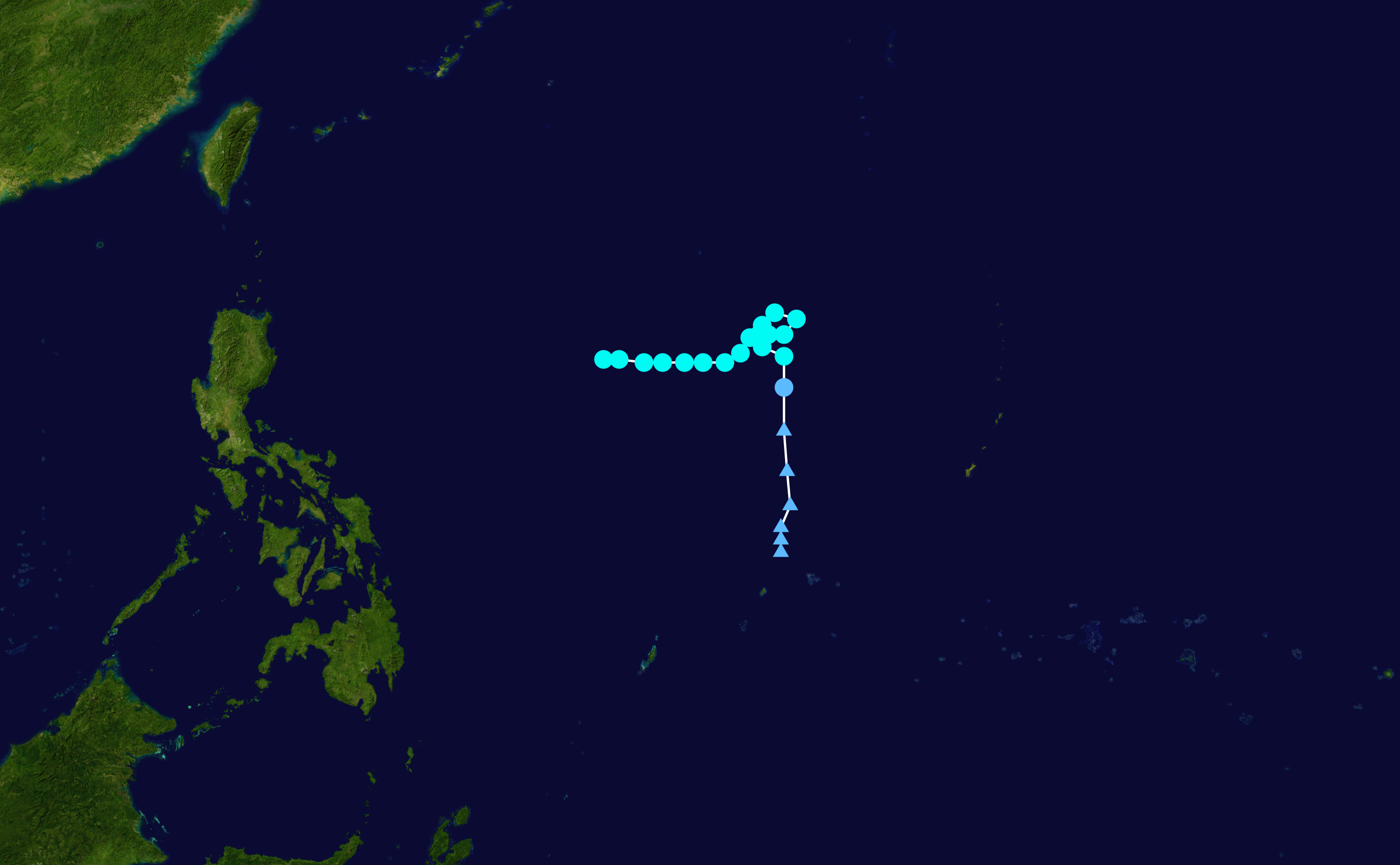
- Duration: November 30 – December 4
- Peak intensity: 85 km/h (50 mph) (1-min); 1000 hPa (mbar)

Tropical Storm Pamela existed from November 30 to December 4.

=== Typhoon Olga ===
- Typhoon (JMA)
- Category 4 typhoon (SSHWS)
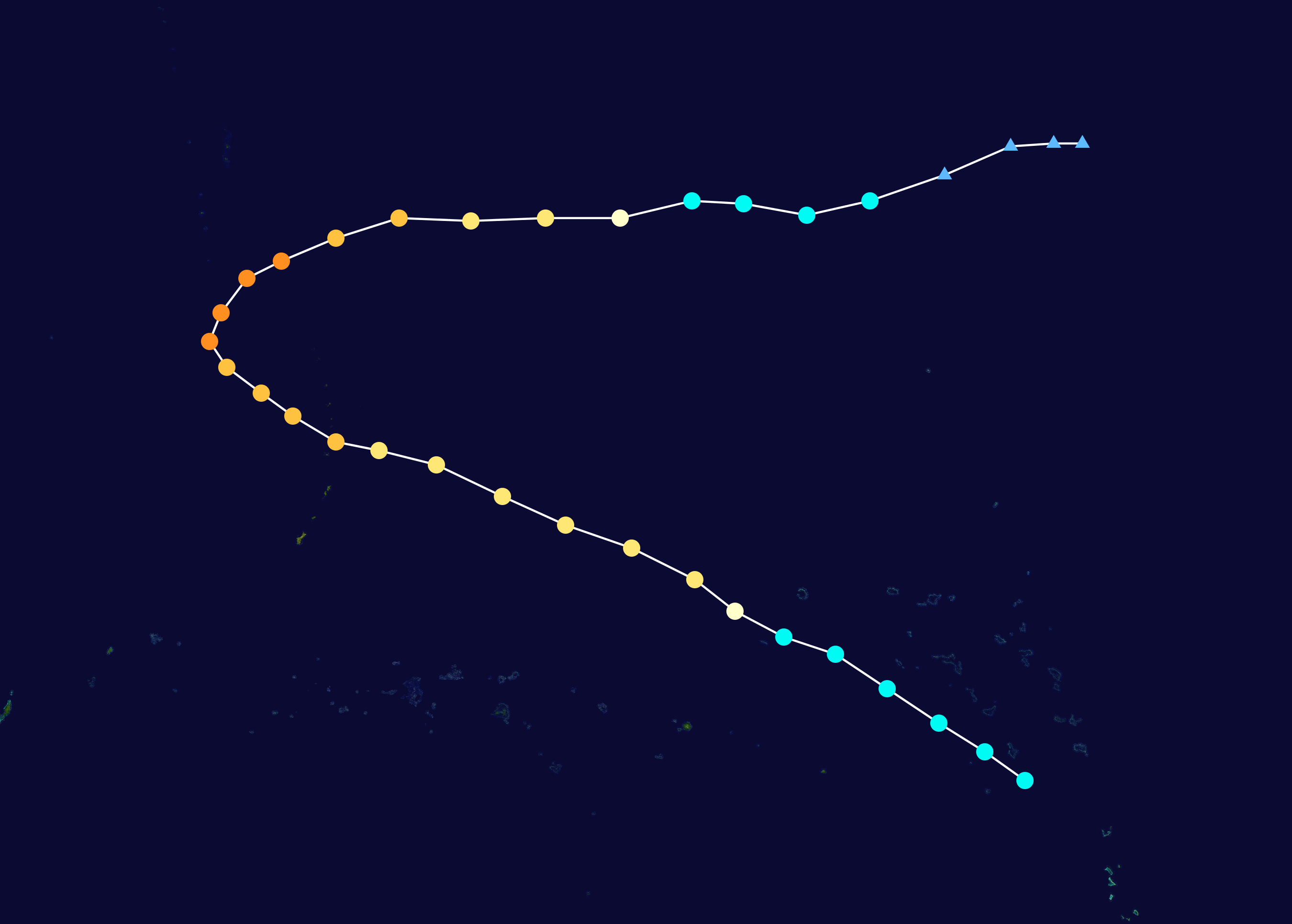
- Duration: December 2 – December 8
- Peak intensity: 230 km/h (145 mph) (1-min); 950 hPa (mbar)

Typhoon Olga existed from December 2 to December 8.

=== JMA Tropical Storm Thirty-one ===
- Tropical storm (JMA)
- Category 1 typhoon (SSHWS)
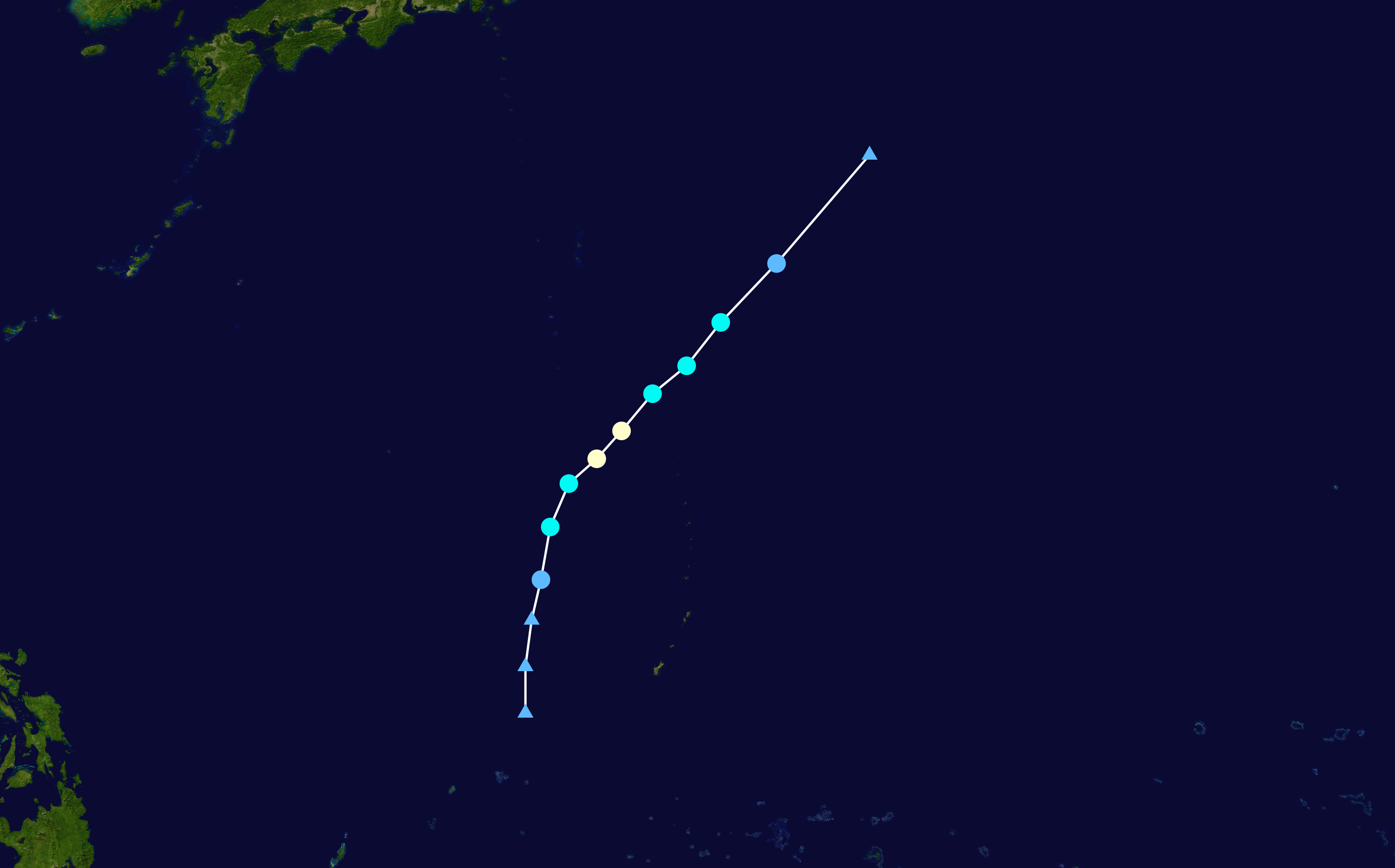
- Duration: December 9 – December 12
- Peak intensity: 125 km/h (80 mph) (1-min); 985 hPa (mbar)

Typhoon 31 existed from December 9 to December 12.

== Storm names ==
- Agnes
- Bess
- Carmen
- Della
- Elaine
- Faye
- Gloria
- Hester
- Irma
- Judy
- Kit
- Lola
- Mamie
- Nina
- Ophelia
- Phyllis
- Rita
- Susan
- Tess
- Viola
- Winnie
- Alice
- Betty
- Cora
- Doris
- Elsie
- Flossie
- Grace
- Helen
- Ida
- June
- Kathy
- Lorna
- Marie
- Nancy
- Olga
- Pamela
- Ruby
- Sally
- Tilda
- Violet
- Wilda
- Anita
- Billie
- Clara
- Dot
- Ellen
- Fran
- Georgia
- Hope
- Iris
- Joan
- Kate
- Louise
- Marge
- Nora
- Opal
- Patsy
- Ruth
- Sarah
- Thelma
- Vera
- Wanda
- Amy
- Babs
- Charlotte
- Dinah
- Emma
- Freda
- Gilda
- Harriet
- Ivy
- Jean
- Karen
- Lucille
- Mary
- Nadine
- Olive
- Polly
- Rose
- Shirley
- Trix
- Virginia
- Wendy

== See also ==
- List of Pacific typhoon seasons
- 1950s South-West Indian Ocean cyclone seasons
- 1950s Australian region cyclone seasons
- 1950s South Pacific cyclone seasons
