= Quentin Durward (disambiguation) =

Quentin Durward is an 1823 novel by Sir Walter Scott.

Quentin Durward may also refer to:

- Quentin Durward (TV series), a French-German TV series
- PS Quentin Durward (1823), an 1823 paddle-wheel steamer
- The Adventures of Quentin Durward, a 1955 British-American film

== See also ==
- Quentin Durward Corley (1884–1980), American judge and inventor
