= Doris (surname) =

Doris is a surname. Notable people with the surname include:

- Bob Doris (born 1973), Scottish politician
- Caelan Doris (born 1998), Irish rugby player
- Ennio Doris (1940–2021), Italian billionaire
- John M. Doris (born 1963), American philosopher
- Mirna Doris (1940–2020), Italian singer
- William Doris (1860–1926), Irish politician
