= Frank Dorrey =

American artist and rapper (born c. 1999)

Frank Dorrey (born c. 1999), also known as DORIS, is an American artist and rapper based in Brooklyn, New York. His 2024 album Ultimate Love Songs Collection was rated the sixteenth best of 2024 by Pitchfork.
