= French submarine Doris =

Three submarines of the French Navy have borne the name Doris:

- French submarine Doris (Q135), a Circé-class submarine launched in 1927 and sunk in 1940
- French submarine Doris (P84), a British V-class submarine ordered as HMS Vineyard, Renamed on acquisition in 1944, she served until 1947.
- French submarine Doris (S643), a Daphné-class submarine launched in 1960 and struck in 1994
