= Dorrit Jacob =

German geochemist

Dorrit Jacob FAA

Academic background
- Education: University of Mainz; University of Göttingen
- Alma mater: Max Planck Institute for Chemistry

Dorrit E. Jacob FAA is a German-born Australian geochemist. She is the first woman to serve as Director of the Research School of Earth Sciences at the Australian National University (ANU) where she is a full professor.

Jacob completed her undergraduate studies in mineralogy and geology at the University of Mainz, Germany. She moved to the Georg-August University in University of Göttingen from which she received a Dr. rer. nat., while her PhD thesis work was performed at the Max-Planck Institute for Chemistry.

Jacob was awarded the Heisenberg Chair in Biomineralisation at the University of Mainz in 2012. In 2013 Jacob moved to Australia where she took up an ARC future fellowship at Macquarie University to study the formation of bivalve shells and pearls and how they are used to reconstruct past records of climate change.

Her areas of research include biomineralisation, and diamond formation. On that last point, Jacob and other researchers closely examined minuscule “melts” enveloped within a diamond and found oxidation of sulfide mineral pyrrhotite can trigger the gem’s growth.

As of 2020 she leads the Biominerals as Environment Archives project at the ANU, where she also is a full Professor.

In May 2021 Jacob was elected a Fellow of the Australian Academy of Science.

== Publications ==
- Redox-freezing and nucleation of diamond via magnetite formation in the Earth’s mantle, 2016
- Element substitution by living organisms: the case of manganese in mollusc shell aragonite, 2016
- Planktic foraminifera form their shells via metastable carbonate phases, 2017
- The mesoscale order of nacreous pearls, 2021
