= Dorit =

Hebrew feminine given name

Dorit is a given name. Notable people with the name include:

- Dorit Aharonov (born 1970), Israeli computer scientist specializing in quantum computing
- Dorit Bar-On (born 1955), American philosopher
- Dorit Bar Or (born 1975), Israeli actress and fashion designer
- Dorit Beinisch (born 1942), 9th president of the Supreme Court of Israel
- Dorit Chrysler (born 1966), Austrian electronic musician
- Dorit Cypis (born 1951), Israeli American artist and mediator
- Dorit Gäbler (born 1943), German stage and film actress and singer
- Dorit Jellinek, Miss Israel 1978
- Dorit Kemsley, American fashion designer and television personality on The Real Housewives of Beverly Hills
- Dorit Orgad, Israeli writer
- Dorit Rubinstein Reiss (born 1972–73), immunization advocate

== See also ==
- Dorrit, a given name
