= Dorey =

Dorey is a surname. Notable people having this surname include:

- Beck Dorey-Stein (born 1986), American stenographer and author
- Brett Dorey (born 1977), Australian cricketer
- Graham Dorey (1932–2015), Bailiff of Guernsey
- Halstead Dorey (1874–1946), head of the United States 2nd Infantry Division
- Jean Dorey (1831–1872), Norman language writer
- Jerry Dorey (born 1951), member of the States of Jersey from 1993 to 2005
- Jim Dorey (born 1947), Canadian ice hockey player
- Justin Dorey (born 1988), Canadian freestyle skier
- Lewis Dorey (1901–1958), English cricketer
- Patrick Dorey (fl. 1990s–2020s), British mathematical physicist

== See also ==
- Beck Dorey-Stein (born 1986), American author and White House stenographer
- Dore (disambiguation)
- Doree (disambiguation)
- Dori (disambiguation)
- Dorie, a given name and surname
- Dory (disambiguation)
