= Douri =

Douri (Arabic: دوري), Al-Douri or Ad-Douri (Arabic: الدوري) is an Arabic-based surname, derived from the name of the Iraqi town Ad-Dawr. Douri may refer to:

- Abdul Aziz Al-Douri (1918–2010), Iraqi university professor, Ph.D., chancellor of Baghdad University
- Izzat Ibrahim al-Douri (1942–2020), Iraqi politician and Army Field Marshal. He served as Vice Chairman of the Iraqi Revolutionary Command Council until the 2003 US-led invasion of Iraq and was regarded as the closest advisor and deputy under former President Saddam Hussein. He led the Iraqi insurgent Naqshbandi Army.
- Saber Abdel Aziz al-Douri, former Iraqi politician, intelligence officer and Governor of Bagdad

== See also ==
- Dawr (Arabic: دور), a musical genre
- Ed-Dur, an ancient Near Eastern city
- Dori (disambiguation)
- Dory (disambiguation)
- Duris (disambiguation) / Douris
