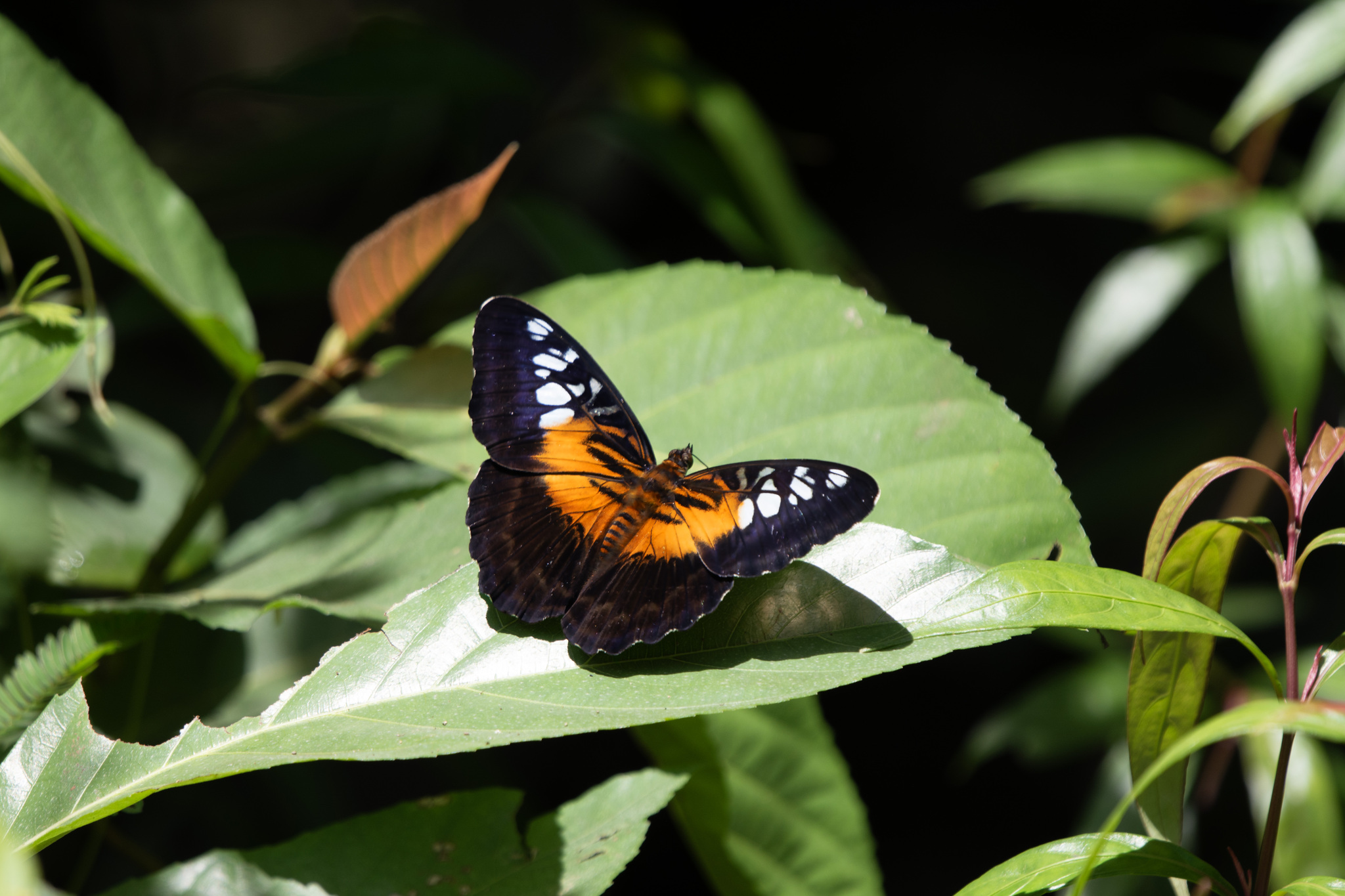
- Upperside
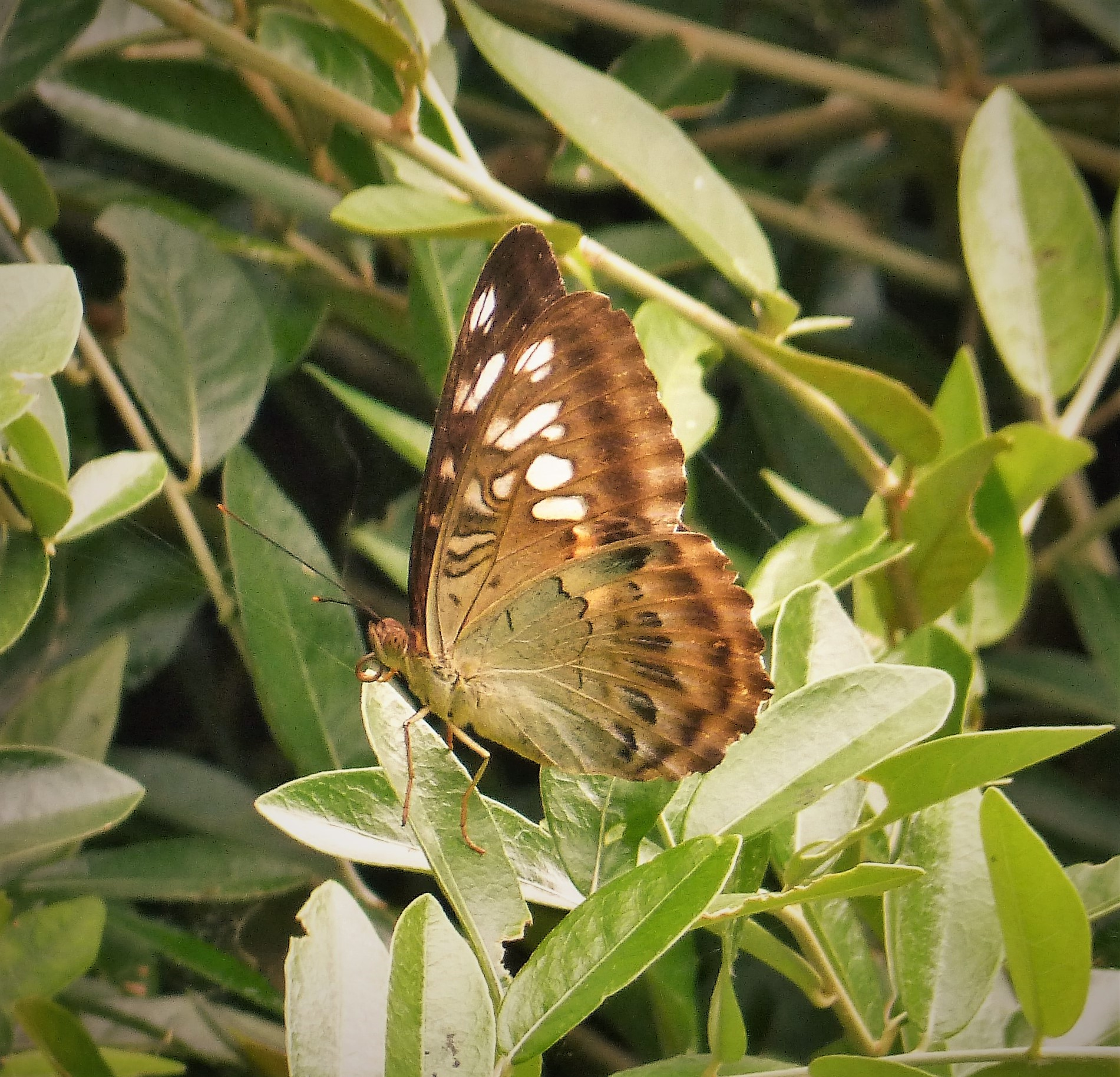
- Underside

Scientific classification
- Kingdom: Animalia
- Phylum: Arthropoda
- Class: Insecta
- Order: Lepidoptera
- Family: Nymphalidae
- Subfamily: Limenitidinae
- Tribe: Parthenini
- Genus: Parthenos
- Species: P. tigrina

Binomial name
- Parthenos tigrina Vollenhoven, 1866

= Parthenos tigrina =

Species of butterfly

Parthenos tigrina is a species of butterfly in the family Nymphalidae. It was discovered by Samuel Constant Snellen van Vollenhoven in 1866. It is endemic to New Guinea and surrounding islands.

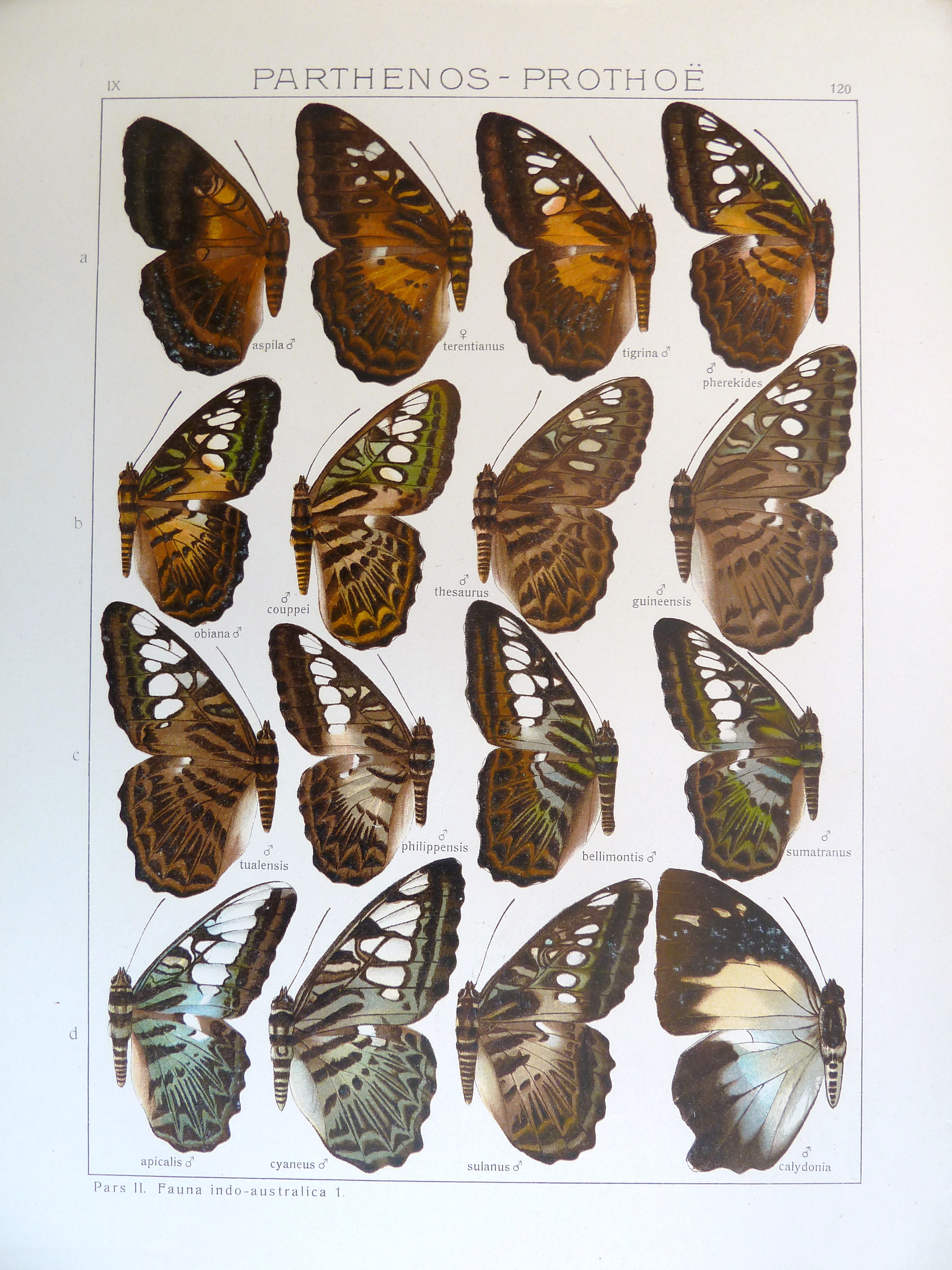
Top middle illustrations

== Description ==
The forewings of P. t. tigrina display white spots with a yellowish tint and a rich brownish-yellow coloration at the wing bases. The underside is yellowish-green with distinct black submarginal bands. Originally described from Salawati, this form closely matches specimens from Aetna and Kajumera Bay in modern day Indonesia. Specimens collected in Geelvink Bay further support its distribution.

Several closely related forms exist within this species group. P. s. nodrica, identified in Dorey, exhibits a darkened form with smaller intramedian spots on the forewings. P. t. terentianus is distinguished in males by forewings entirely covered in black scales, found in the Arfak Mountains.

The larvae of P. tigrina are known to live in large communal groups. They are differentiated from P. sylvia guineensis by their darker dorsal line. The larvae are highly variable in coloration, ranging from lighter to darker forms, all covered in white bristles and feeding on climbing plants. The pupae are green, boat-shaped, and feature two head points.

Another related form, P. t. pardalis, differs from P. t. tigrina by having a broader black outer margin on all wings and smaller, white hyaline spots on the forewings. Additional distinguishing features include a reduction in the number of white costal and subapical spots and broader black markings along the anal angle of the forewings. The underside of P. t. pardalis is notably melanistic, with extensive black submarginal bands and a heavily bordered outer margin, characteristics not mentioned in P. t. tigrina's original description. P. t. pardalis has been recorded on Waigeo Island.

== Subspecies ==
Five subspecies are recognized:

- Parthenos tigrina terentianus (Fruhstorfer, 1912)
- Parthenos tigrina cynailurus (Fruhstorfer, 1915)
- Parthenos tigrina tigrina
- Parthenos tigrina pardalis (Fruhstorfer, 1904) - Waigeu
- Parthenos tigrina mysolica (Rothschild, 1915) - Misool
