= Dori =

Dori may refer to:

== Places ==
- Dori, Burkina Faso, a city
  - Dori Department
  - Roman Catholic Diocese of Dori
  - Dori Airport
- Dori River, in Afghanistan and Pakistan
- Dori, Dharwad, India, a village

== People ==
=== Given name, nickname or stage name ===
- Dori of Yejju (died 1831), a chief of one of the tribes of the Oromo people in Ethiopia
- Dori Arad (born 1982), Israeli footballer
- Dori Caymmi (born 1943), Brazilian singer, guitarist, songwriter, arranger and producer
- Dori Dorika (1913–1996), Russian-born Italian actress born Dorotea Massa
- Izidor Kürschner (ca. 1885–1940), Hungarian footballer
- Dori J. Maynard (born 1958), President of the Robert C. Maynard Institute for Journalism Education in Oakland, California
- Dori Monson (1961–2022), American radio personality
- Dorielton Gomes Nascimento (born 1990), Brazilian footballer
- Dori Parra de Orellana (1923–2007), Venezuelan politician
- Teodora Ruano (born 1969), Spanish racing cyclist
- Dori Seda (1951–1988), American artist
- Dori Sanders (born 1934), African-American novelist and food writer

=== Last name ===
- Dov Dori (born 1953), Israeli-American computer scientist
- Fabrizio Dori, Italian comics artist
- Franco Dori (1943–1987), Italian footballer
- Leonora Dori (1571–1617), a favourite of Queen Marie de Médici of France; executed for witchcraft
- Sandro Dori (1938–2021), Italian actor
- Yaakov Dori (1899–1973), first Chief of Staff of the Israel Defense Forces

== Fictional or mythological characters ==
- One of the dwarves in the Old Norse poem Völuspá
- Dori (Middle-earth), a dwarf of J. R. R. Tolkien's legendarium
- Dori and Gura, twin archers serving under Oboro in the anime and manga series Utawarerumono
- Dori Graham, a main protagonist in 1956 musical drama Rock, Rock, Rock!, portrayed by Tuesday Weld
- Rainbow Girl (Dori Aandraison), a DC Comics heroine
- Dori Duz, a minor character in the novel Catch-22 by Joseph Heller
- Dori, a character in 2020 video game Genshin Impact

== Other uses ==
- SS Dori, a cargo liner in service from 1965 to 1967

== See also ==
- Dory (disambiguation)
- Dorie (disambiguation)
- Doris (disambiguation)
