= Dorrie =

Dorrie is a given name and surname. Notable people with the name include:

== People ==
- Dorrie Nossiter (1893–1977), English jeweller and jewellery designer
- Doris Dörrie (born 1955), German film director, producer and author
- Dorrie Timmermanns (born 1965), Dutch wheelchair tennis player

== Fictional characters ==
- John Dorie, a character on Fear the Walking Dead (season 4)
- Dorrie, a plesiosaur in the Super Mario series, debuting in the video game Super Mario 64.

== See also ==
- Dorie
- Dorries
- Dory (disambiguation)
