= Doree =

Doree or Dorée may refer to:

== People ==
- Ada Dorée (1850–1916), English singer and actor
- Doree, character in the 2009 text Too Much Happiness
- Doree Macy, character in the 1931 film My Past
- Dorée Malone, entry in List of Blueberry characters
- Doree Shafrir (born 1977), American writer and podcast host
- Doris Doree, an acting name of Doris Doscher (1882–1970)
- Françoise Thérèse de Voyer de Dorée (fl. 1681), French aristocrat
- Herbert John Doree (fl. 1918), candidate for Willesden East (UK Parliament constituency)
- Suzanne Dorée (fl. 1989–2019), American mathematician
- Victor Dorée (fl. c. 1933), financier for Jean Batten

== Other uses ==
- Doree (TV series) – Indian Hindi television series
- Dory (disambiguation) – some listed entries may be referred to as Doree
  - For example, List of fishes known as dory
- Saint Lucia's Dorée River
- La Dorée, French commune
