= Duri =

Duri may refer to:

- Duri, New South Wales, Australia
- Duri, Indonesia, a town in the Riau province on Sumatra, Indonesia
- Duri language, an Austronesian language of Sulawesi, Indonesia
- Duri people, an ethnic group in Indonesia
- Duri (name), Korean given name (including a list of people with the name)
- Düri, village in the Tibet Autonomous Region in China.

== See also ==
- Duris (disambiguation)
