= Hunky =

Hunky may refer to:

- Hunky (ethnic slur), American slang
- hunk or beefcake, male stereotype
- Hunky Shaw (1884–1969), American baseball player
- Hunky, from Hunky and Spunky

== See also ==
- Hunky dory (disambiguation)
- Honky (disambiguation)
