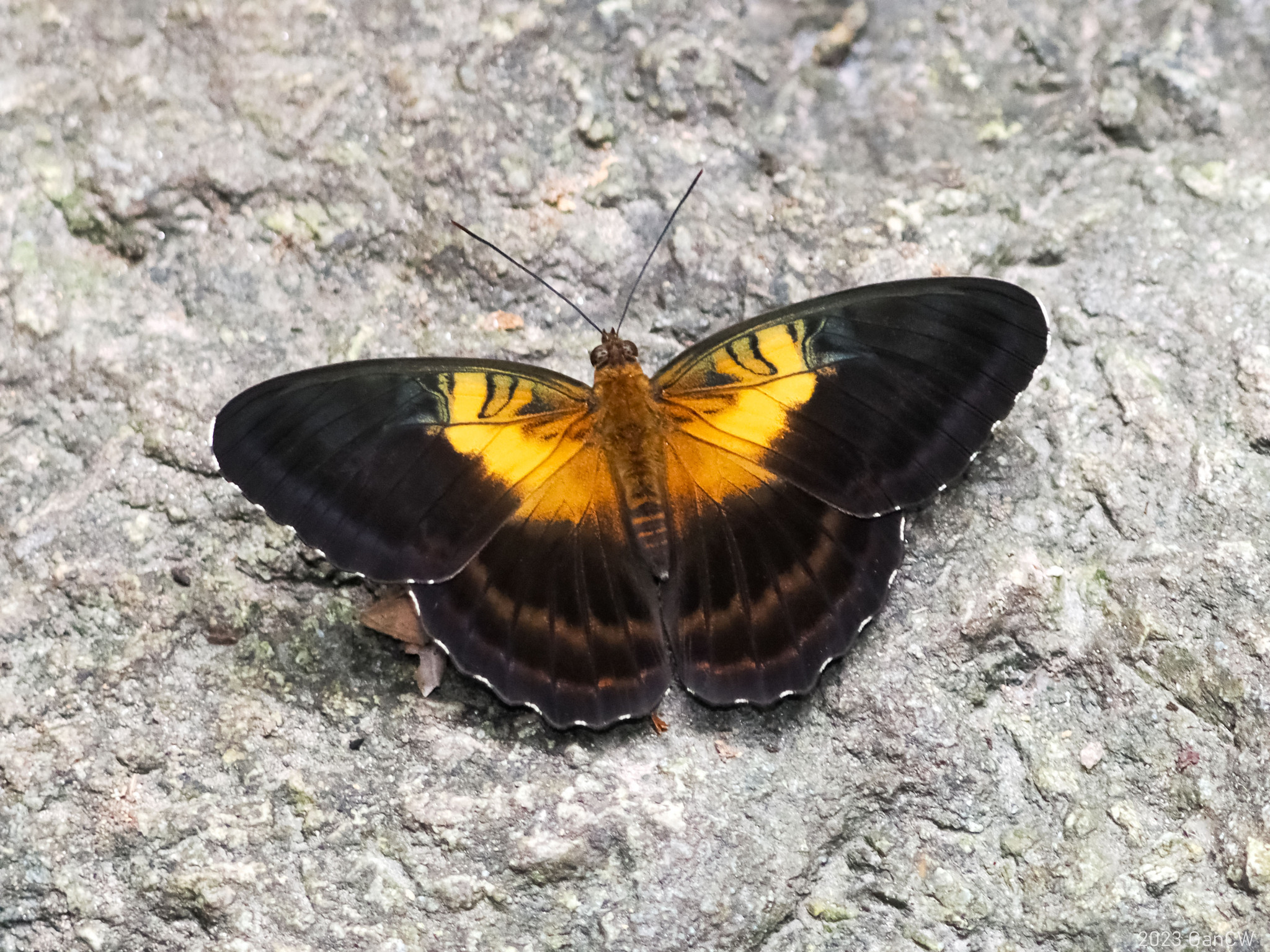
- Upperside
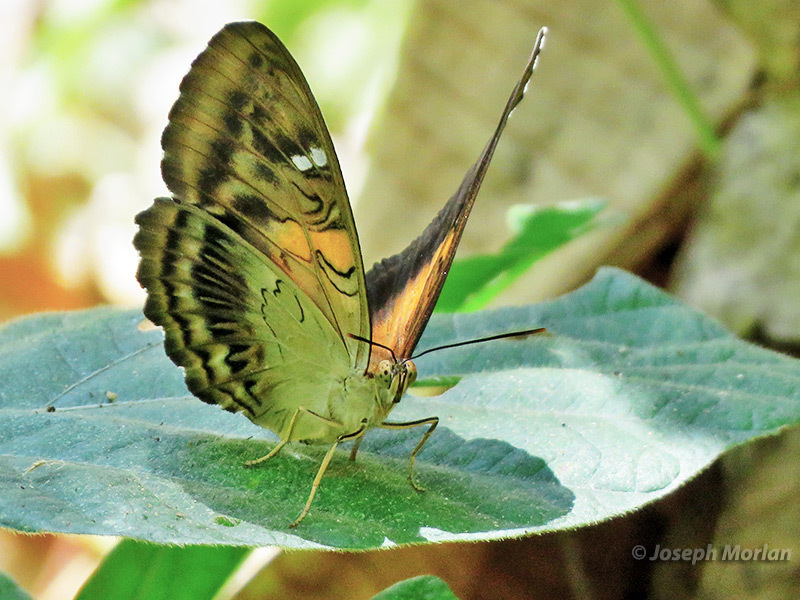
- Underside

Scientific classification
- Domain: Eukaryota
- Kingdom: Animalia
- Phylum: Arthropoda
- Class: Insecta
- Order: Lepidoptera
- Family: Nymphalidae
- Subfamily: Limenitidinae
- Tribe: Parthenini
- Genus: Parthenos
- Species: P. aspila

Binomial name
- Parthenos aspila Honrath, 1888

Synonyms
- Parthenos sylvia aspila

= Parthenos aspila =

Species of butterfly

Parthenos aspila is a species of butterfly in the family Nymphalidae. It was discovered by Eduard Honrath in 1888. It is found throughout New Guinea.

== Description ==
Upperside : Corresponding with P. tigrina in the dark brown ground color and yellowish-brown coloring of the basal part of the forewings and hindwings. However, this yellowish-brown basal field extends less far into the wing disc, but reaches almost to the leading edge on the forewing. Across within the discal cell are greenish-yellow, black-bordered spots, one close to the cross-vein, the second larger, with its tip pointing towards the latter, in the middle, while the greenish dusted root coloring is bordered outwards by a black line.

In the ground color, darker and lighter bands, running across both pairs of wings, are marked.

Underside : The white spots characteristic of Parthenos species, which are completely absent on the upperside, are replaced by black except for 2, which are close together on the leading edge of the forewings.

Only the forewings have, though duller, the yellowish-brown basal field of the upperside.

In comparison to tigrina, the spotted bands of the hindwings, corresponding to the wing shape of aspila, show a more rounded form. The black, jagged line, interrupted by the veins, running from the leading edge to the inner edge, runs almost parallel to the outer margin in aspila, whereas in the other known Parthenos species it tends more towards the middle of the inner edge in its course.

The sexes show no noteworthy differences in color, pattern, and size.

Length of the forewing 44-45 mm.

— Eduard Honrath, Berliner Entomologischer Verein

== Subspecies ==
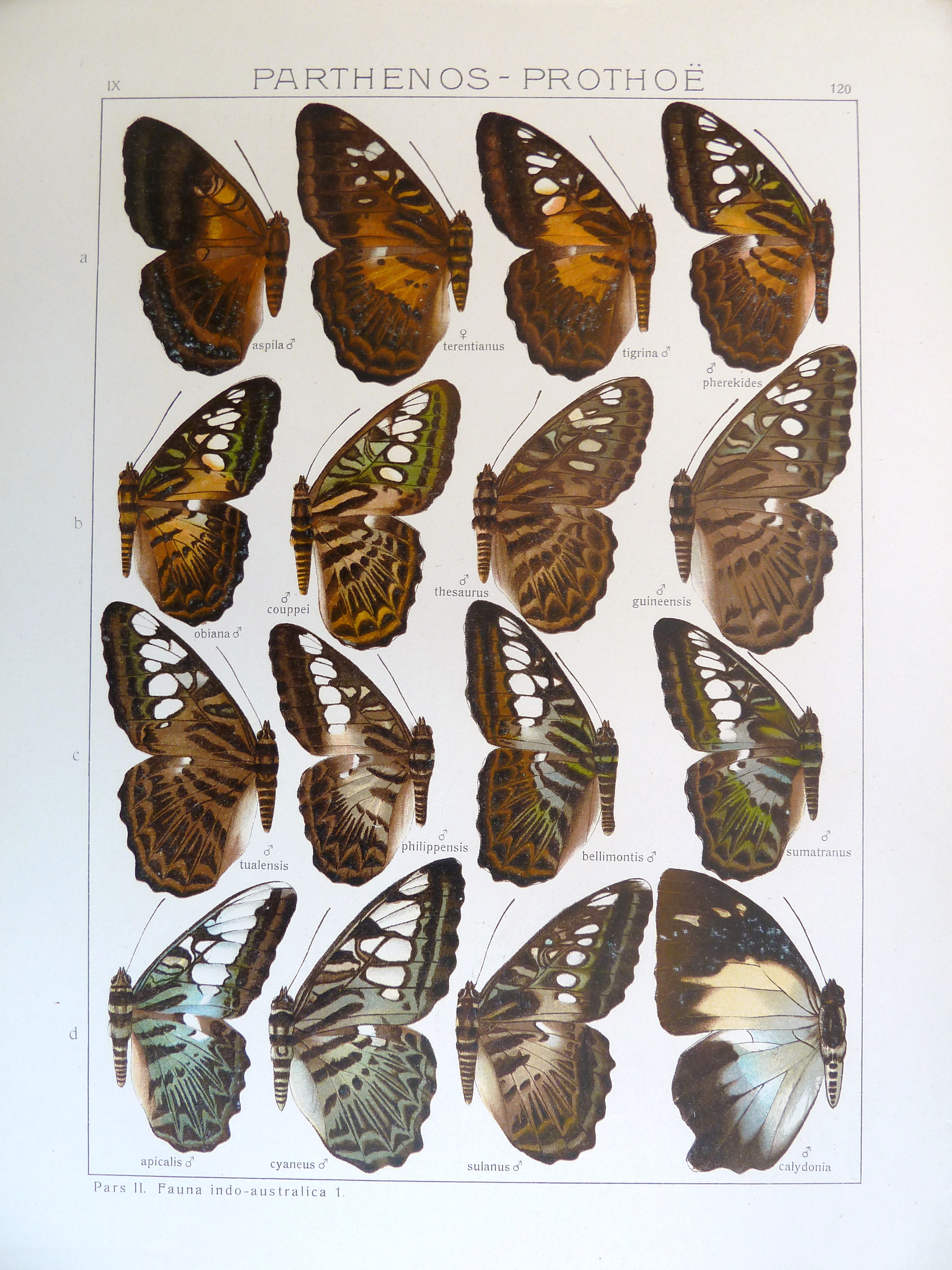

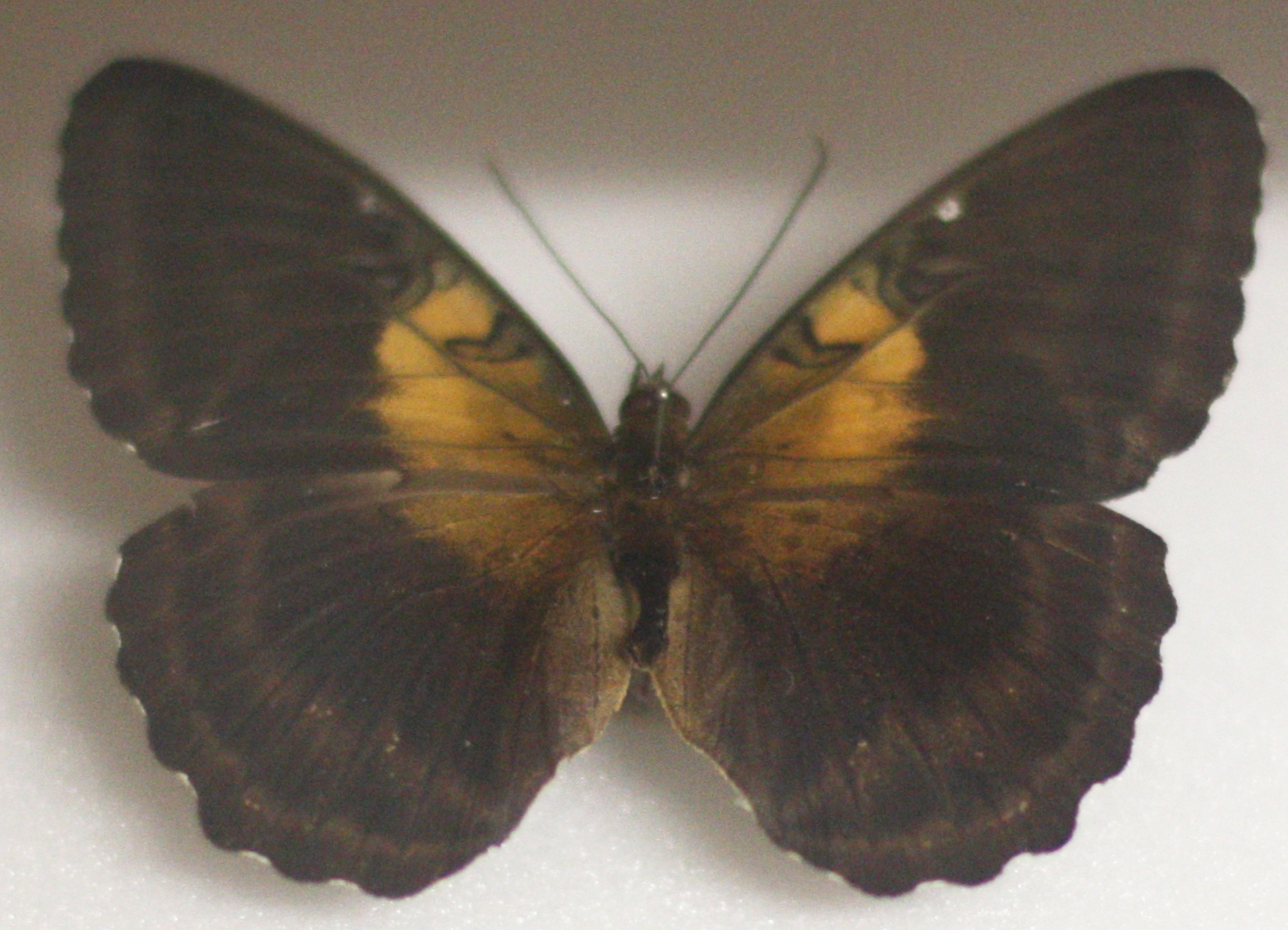
Specimen (vulcanica)

Three subspecies are recognized:

- Parthenos aspila aspila (Fruhstorfer, 1916) - mainland New Guinea
- Parthenos aspila tenebrosa (Rothschild, 1915) - Dampier Island
- Parthenos aspila vulcanica (Rothschild, 1915) - Vulcan Island

P. a. tenebrosa is differed from aspila as the rufous basal portion of the upperside of tenebrosa is suffused with green-black scales.

P. a. vulcanica is differed from aspila by the basal area being pale orange-rufous suffused with olive green and a whitish patch at the end of cell of forewing.
