= Duris =

Duris or Douris may refer to:

- Duris, Lebanon, a village near Baalbek, Lebanon

== People ==
=== Given name ===
- Duris of Samos (4th c. BC), at times Douris, philosopher, writer, and tyrant
- Duris (artist) (5th c. BC), Athenian potter and painter
- Duris Maxwell (born 1946), Canadian drummer

=== Surname ===
- Romain Duris (born 1974), French actor
- Peter Douris (born 1966), retired Canadian professional ice hockey player
- Miller M. Duris (1928–2014), American politician
- Michal Ďuriš (born 1988), Slovak footballer
- Peter Ďuriš (born 1981), Duris, or Durish
- Radoslav Ďuriš (born 1974), Slovak wheelchair curler, Paralympian
- Raina Douris (born 1986), Canadian radio broadcaster
- Vítězslav Ďuriš (born 1954), professional ice hockey player

== See also ==
- Douri, a surname
- Duri (disambiguation)
