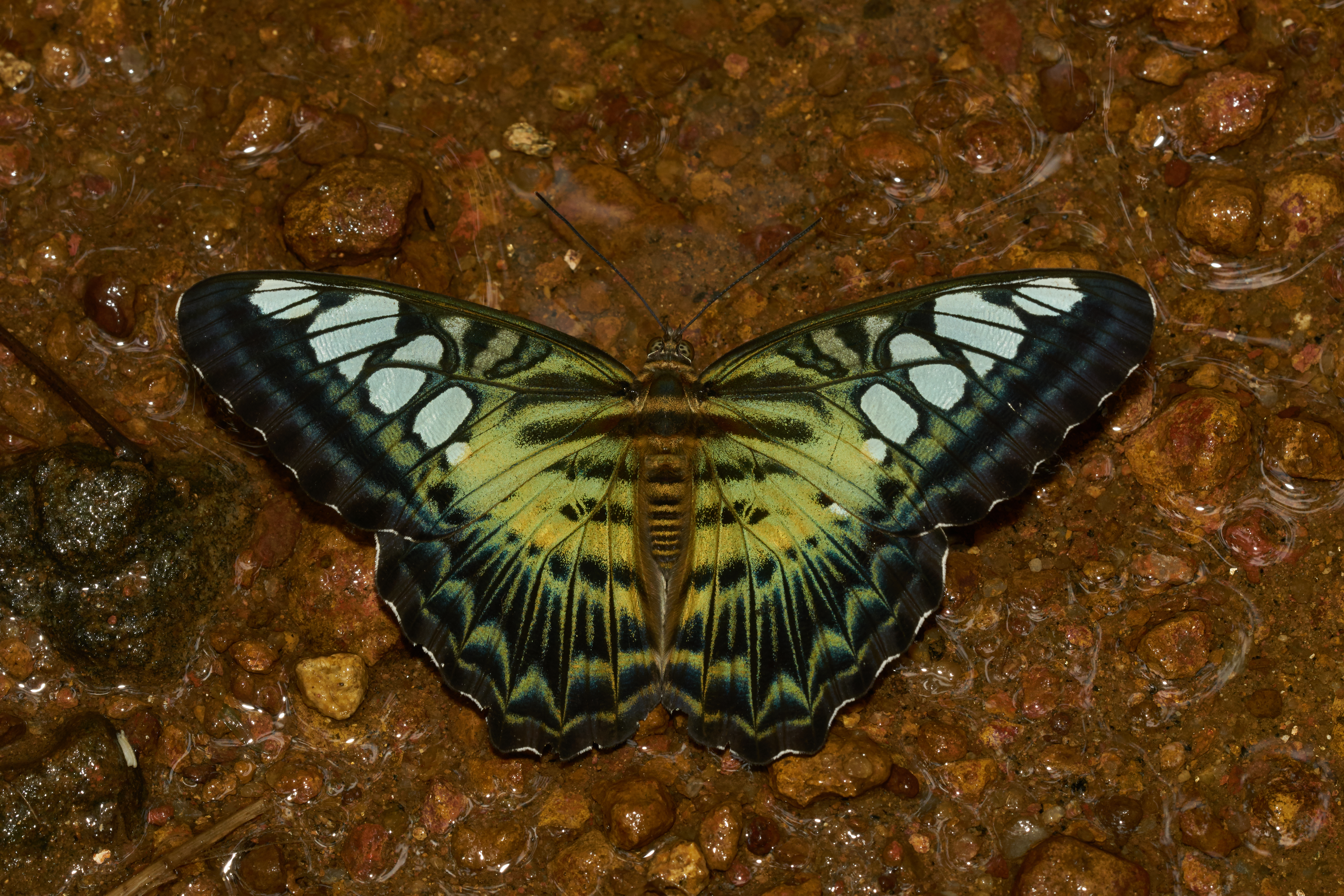
- P. s. virens, Sahyadri clipper
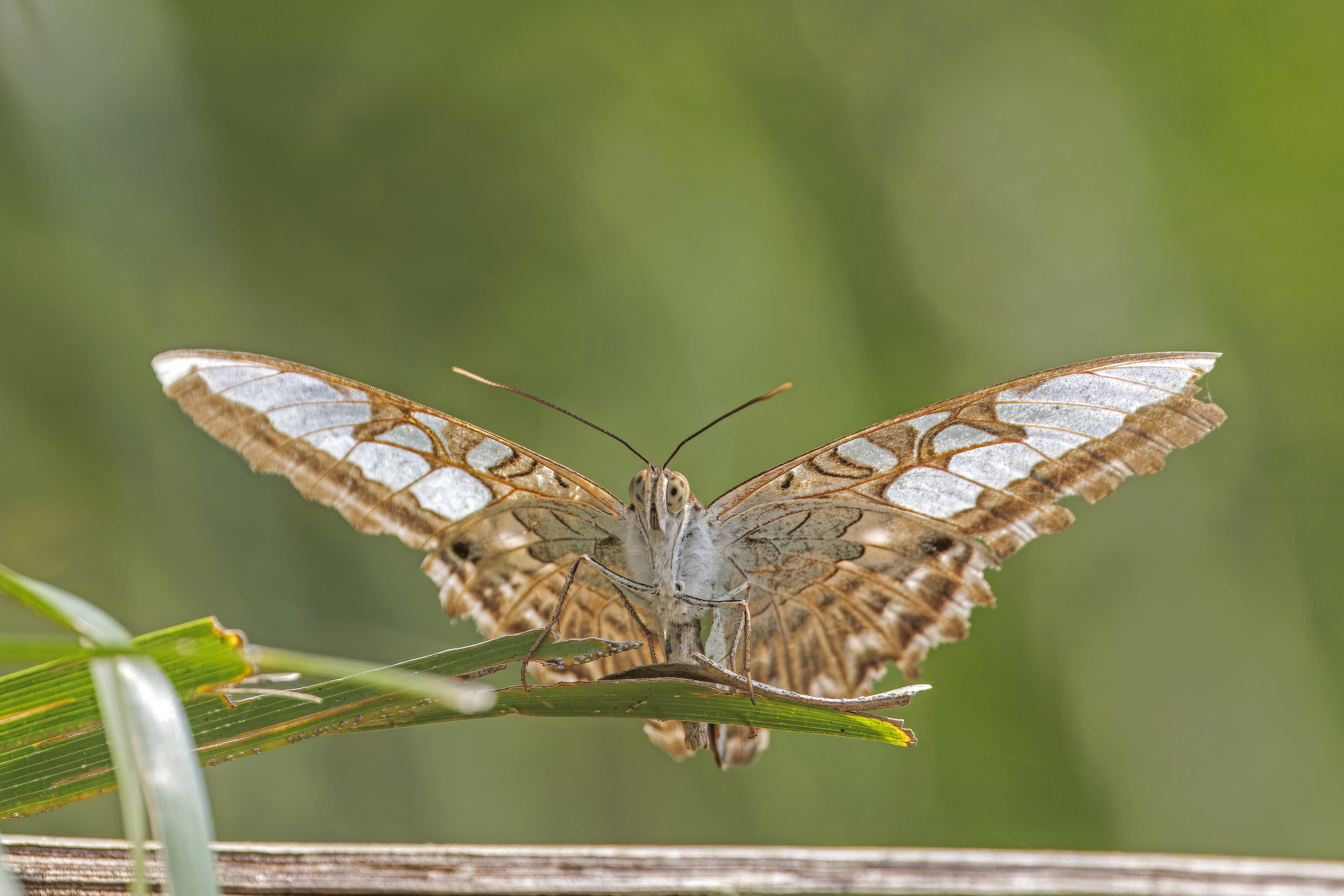
- P. s. gambrisius, Laos

Scientific classification
- Kingdom: Animalia
- Phylum: Arthropoda
- Clade: Pancrustacea
- Class: Insecta
- Order: Lepidoptera
- Family: Nymphalidae
- Genus: Parthenos
- Species: P. sylvia

Binomial name
- Parthenos sylvia (Cramer, [1776])

Subspecies
- Many, see text

Synonyms
- Papilio sylvia

= Parthenos sylvia =

Species of butterfly

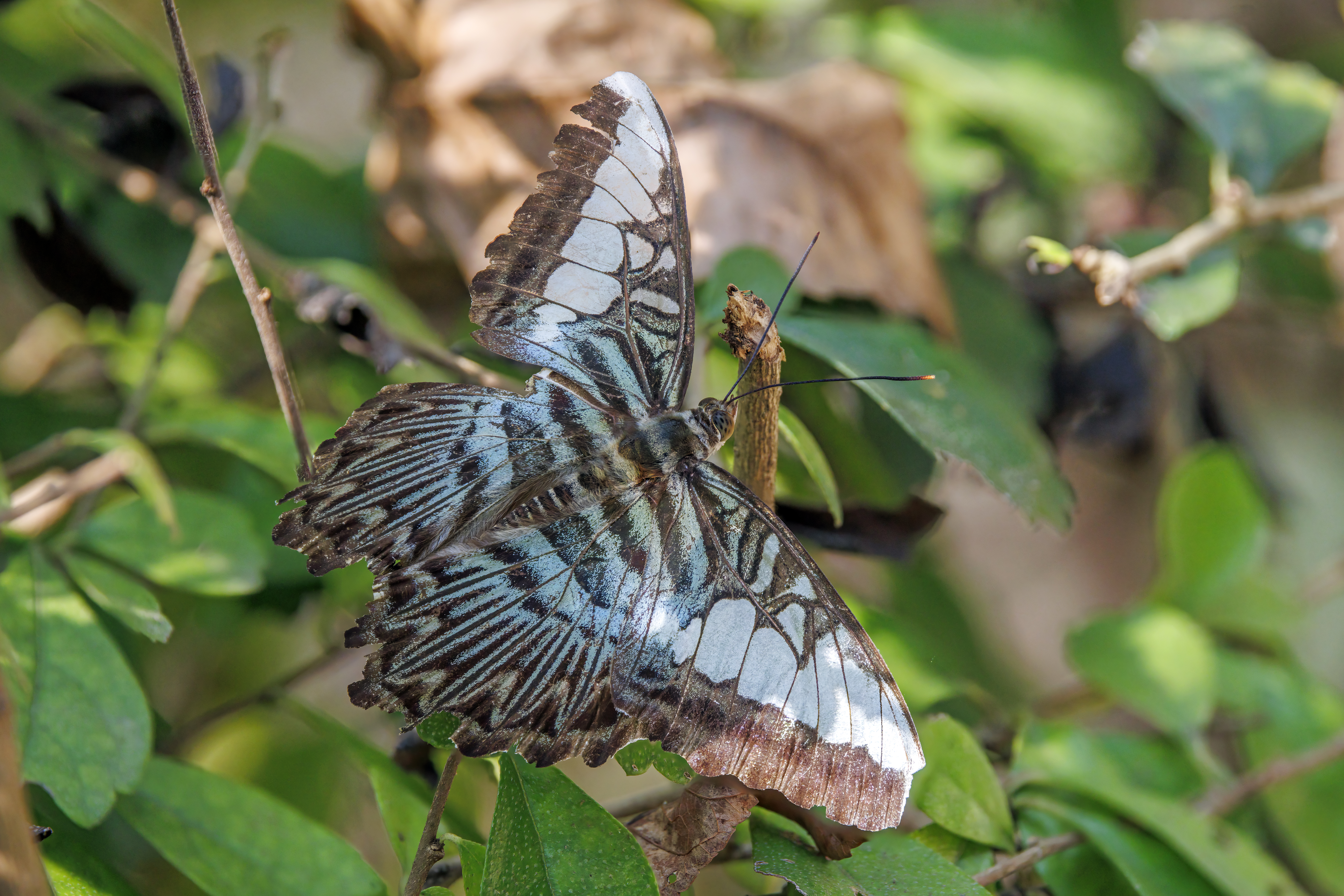
P. s. gambriseus, Laos

Parthenos sylvia, the clipper, is a species of nymphalid butterfly found in south and southeast Asia, mostly in forested areas. The clipper is a fast-flying butterfly and has a habit of flying with its wings flapping stiffly between the horizontal position and a few degrees below the horizontal. It may glide between spurts of flapping.

== Description ==
Male. Wings large, broad. Forewing triangular; costa very slightly curved, apex rounded, exterior margin oblique and slightly scalloped, posterior margin short, angle convex; costal vein extending to two-thirds of the costal margin, free from the subcostal in both sexes; first and second subcostal branches somewhat undulated, the first subcostal emitted before one-half length of the cell, second at one-sixth before the end, third at half length beyond the cell and curved upward, running close along second for some distance and ending at the apex, fourth and fifth on a short footstalk starting from near base of the third; cell long, narrow; upper discocellular extremely short, bent immediately below the subcostal, middle discocellular inwardly oblique and straight, lower discocellular concave and directed inward, radials from the upper and lower angles; upper median veinlet bent convexly upward beyond the cell and then extending parallel and at equal distance with lower branches, middle branch emitted before end of the cell, lower branch at a considerable distance before its end; submedian recurved near its base. Hindwing short, very broad, somewhat quadrate; exterior margin scalloped, produced outward below the middle; costal vein much arched from the base and extending to the apex; precostal vein distinct, extending parallel with and joined to the costal — thus forming a closed precostal cell — and there throwing off a short bifid spur, towards the costa, immediately before its junction with the costal vein; cell very short; first and second subcostal branches emitted at about equal distances from upper base of cell; upper and lower discocellulars outwardly-oblique, each slightly concave, lower discocellular slender, radial from their middle; two upper median branches emitted from end of the cell, upper bent convexly near its base, lower from one-third before end of the cell; submedian curved near the base; internal vein straight, short. Body stout, abdomen short; palpi ascending, pilose beneath and above at tip of second joint; second joint very long, extending to a level with vertex, third joint very short, pointed; legs slender, long; antennae long, gradually thickened towards the tip. Eyes naked. Sexes alike.

— Frederic Moore, Lepidoptera Indica. Vol. III

The various forms or subspecies are closely aligned and greatly resemble one another.

Video clip

== Range ==
The species lives in the Western Ghats, Bangladesh, Assam, Cambodia, Myanmar, Laos, Sri Lanka, and Southeast Asia (Malaya, Philippines, and New Guinea).

== Life history ==
Larva. Cylindrical; head and anal segment with short simple spines; segments three to 12 with longer branched spines, reddish brown, those on three and four comparatively very long. Pale green, with yellowish-white lateral stripes one on each side.

Pupa. "brown, boat-shaped." (After Davidson & Aitken)

== Subspecies ==
Video - dorsal view. Captive specimen.

Listed alphabetically:

- P. s. admiralia (Rothschild, 1915)
- P. s. apicalis (Moore, 1878)
- P. s. aruana (Moore, [1897])
- P. s. bandana (Fruhstorfer)
- P. s. bellimontis (Fruhstorfer, 1899)
- P. s. borneensis (Staudinger, 1889)
- P. s. brunnea (Staudinger, 1888)
- P. s. couppei (Ribbe, 1898)
- P. s. cyaneus (Moore, 1877)
- P. s. ellina (Fruhstorfer, 1899)
- P. s. gambrisius (Fabricius, 1787)
- P. s. guineensis (Fruhstorfer, 1899)
- P. s. joloensis (Fruhstorfer, 1899)
- P. s. lilacinus (Butler, 1879) – blue clipper
- P. s. nadiae (Casteleyn, 2020)
- P. s. nodrica (Boisduval, 1832)
- P. s. numita (Fruhstorfer)
- P. s. obiana (Fruhstorfer, 1904)
- P. s. pherekrates (Fruhstorfer, 1904)
- P. s. pherekides (Fruhstorfer, 1904)
- P. s. philippinensis (Fruhstorfer, 1899) – brown clipper
- P. s. roepstorfii (Moore, [1897])
- P. s. salentia (Hopffer, 1874)
- P. s. silvicola (Fruhstorfer, 1897)
- P. s. sulana (Fruhstorfer, 1899)
- P. s. sumatrensis (Fruhstorfer, 1899)
- P. s. sylla (Donovan, 1798)
- P. s. theriotes (Fruhstorfer)
- P. s. thesaurinus (Grose-Smith, 1897)
- P. s. thesaurus (Mathew, 1887)
- P. s. tualensis (Fruhstorfer, 1899)
- P. s. ugiensis (Fruhstorfer)
- P. s. virens (Moore, 1877)
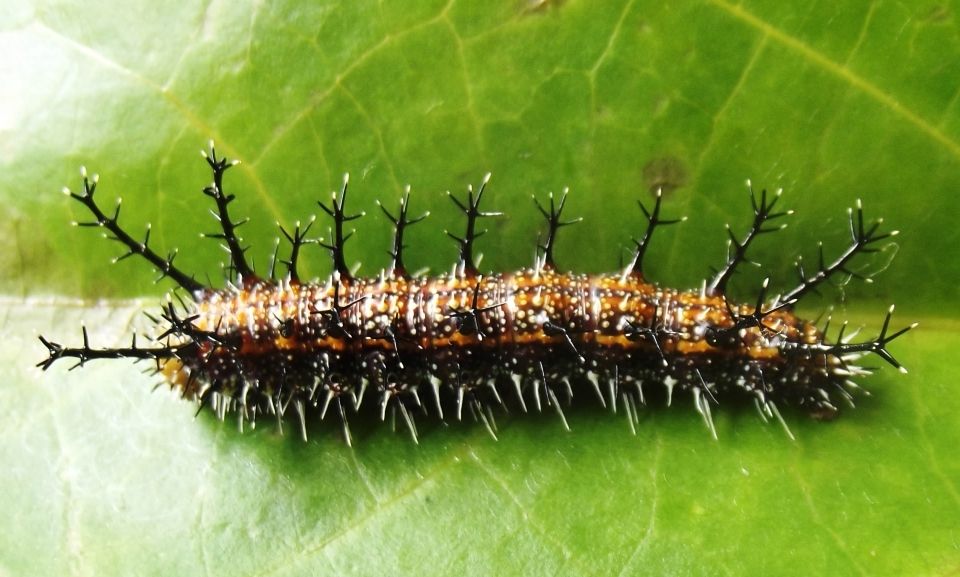
Larva

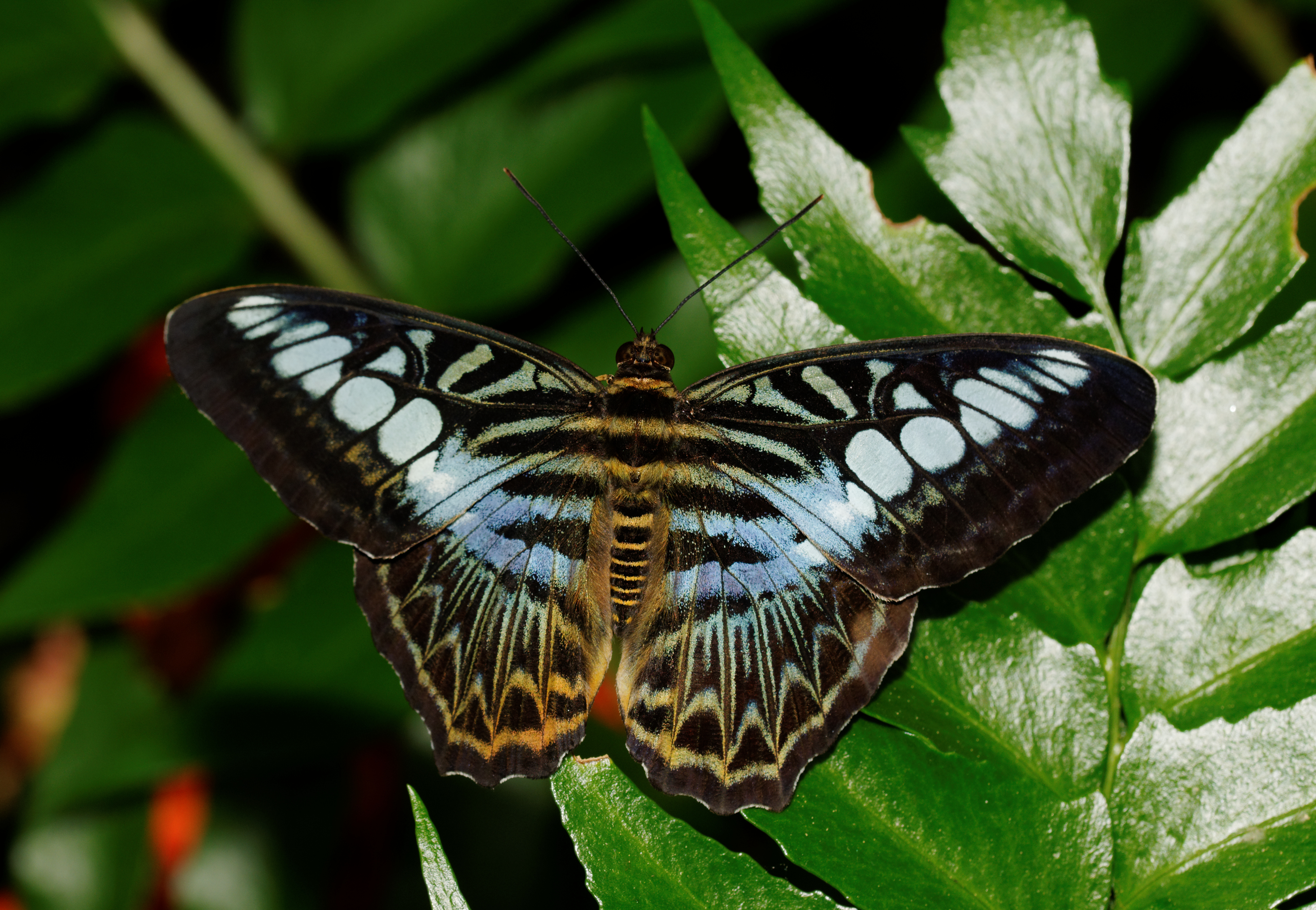
Blue clipper

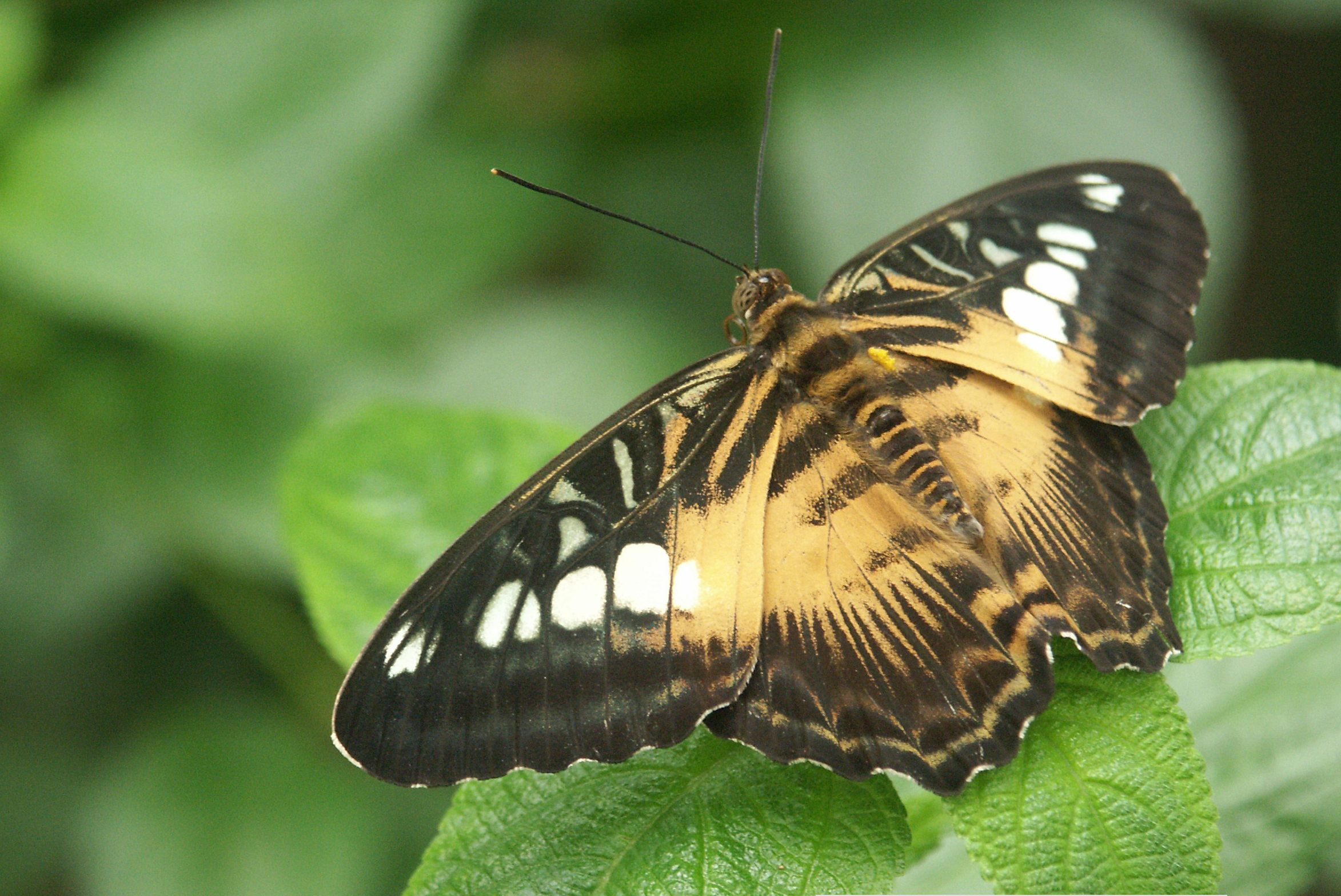
Race philippensis

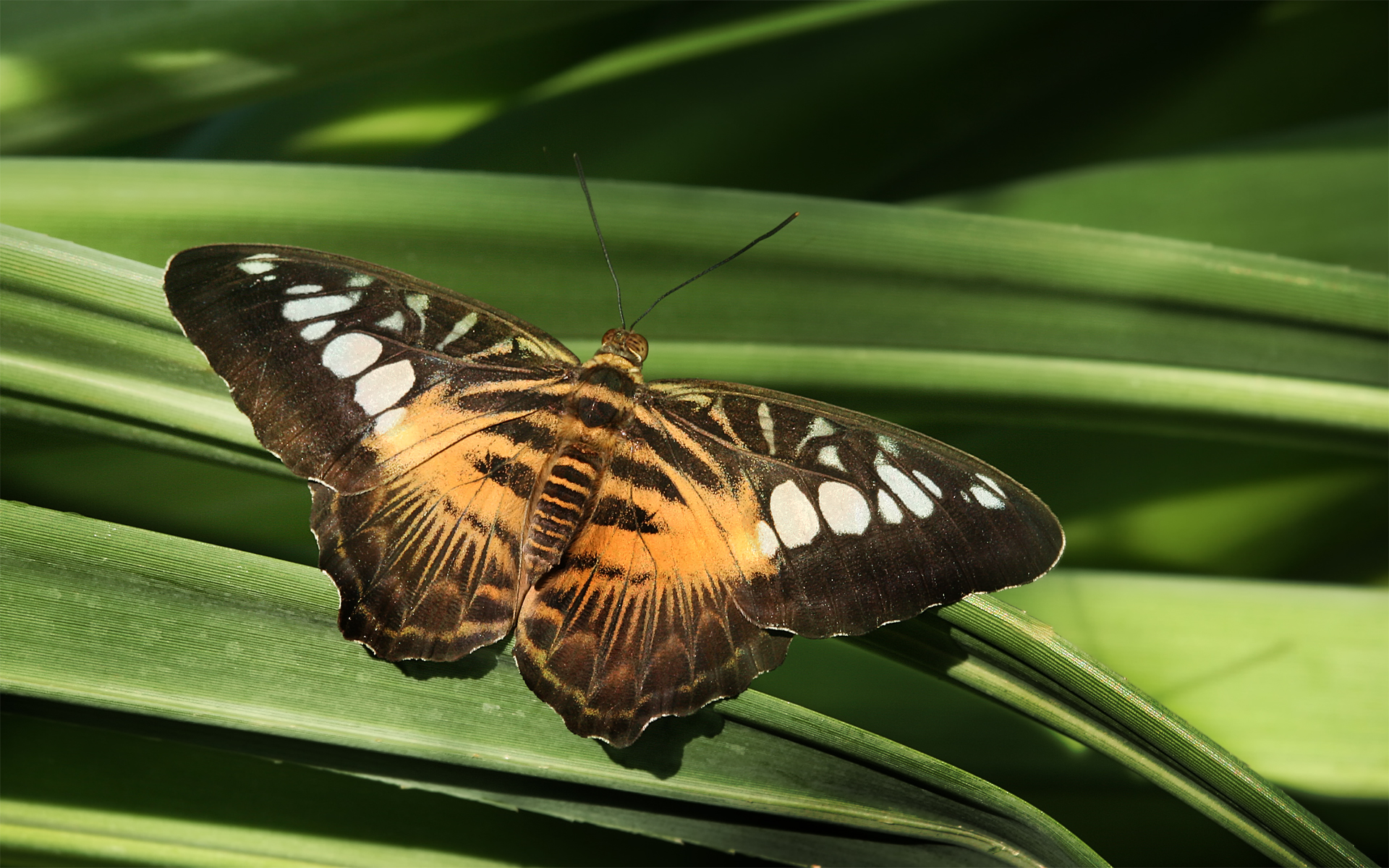
Brown clipper

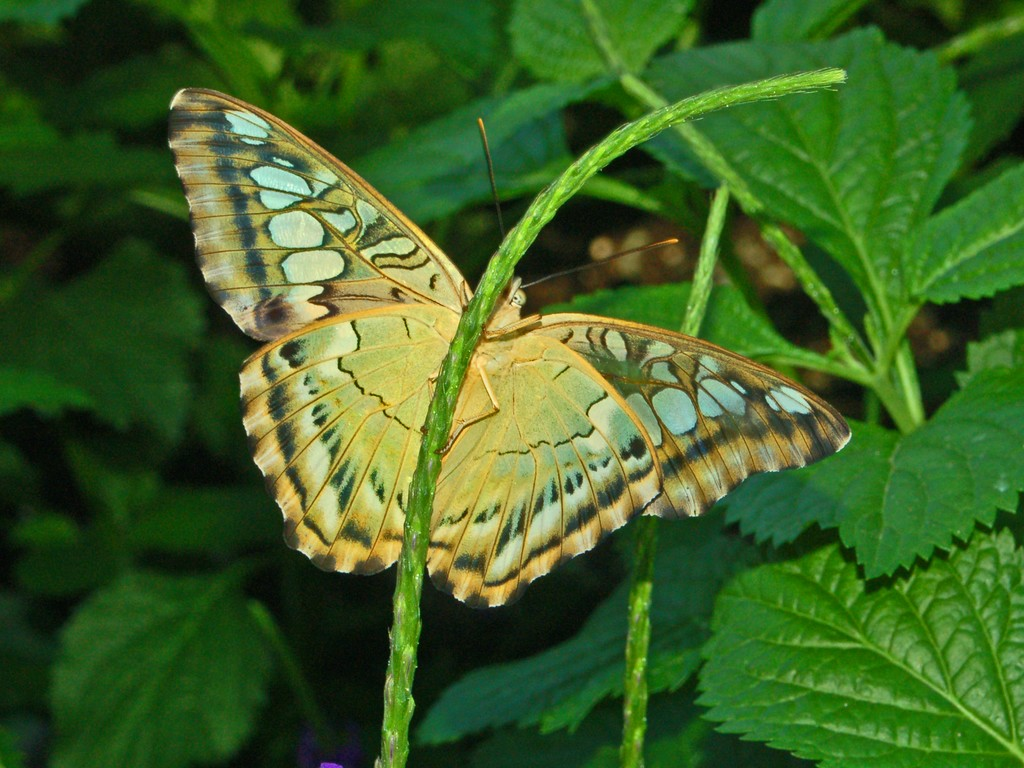
Ventral view

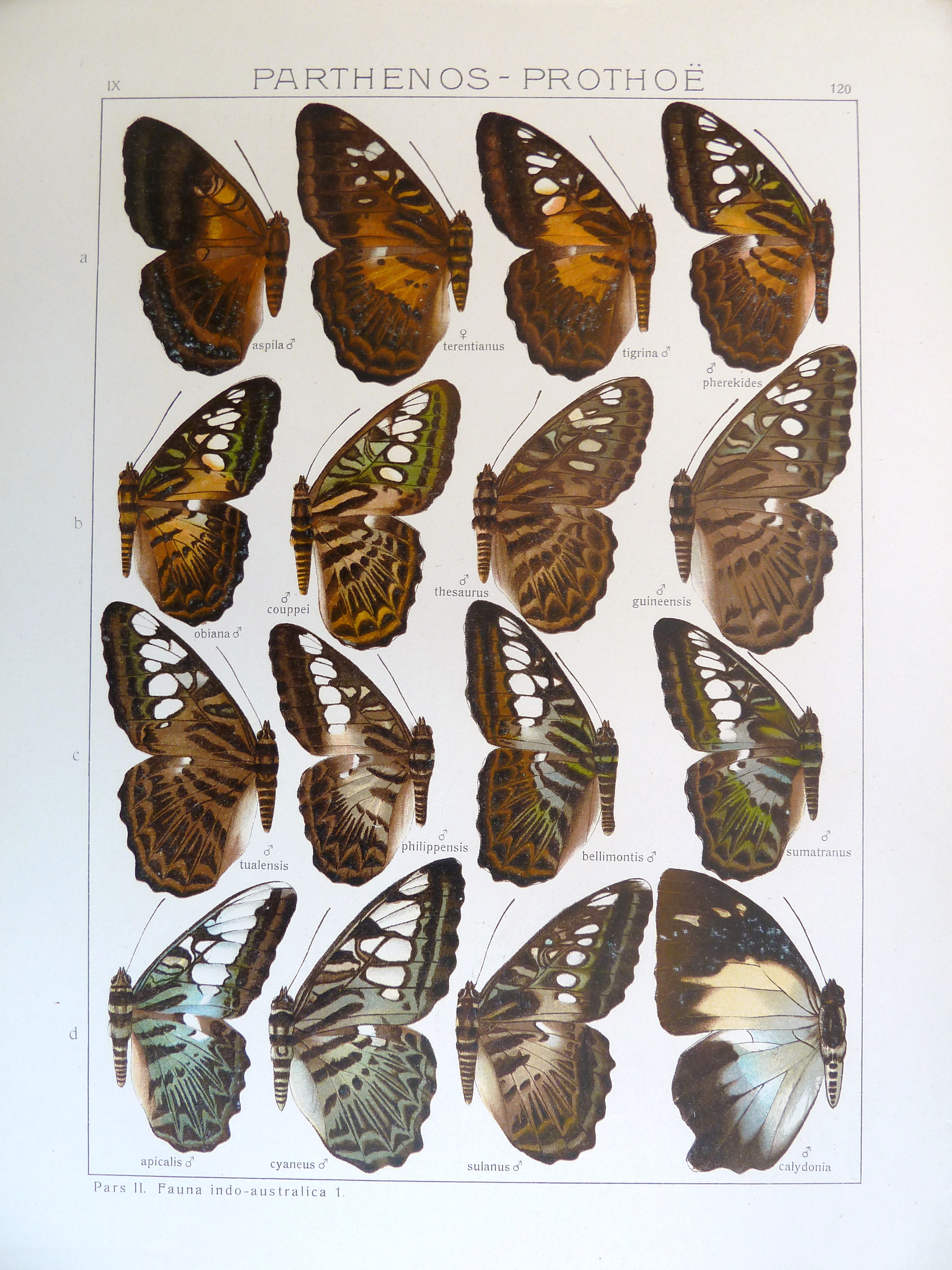
Races depicted in Seitz

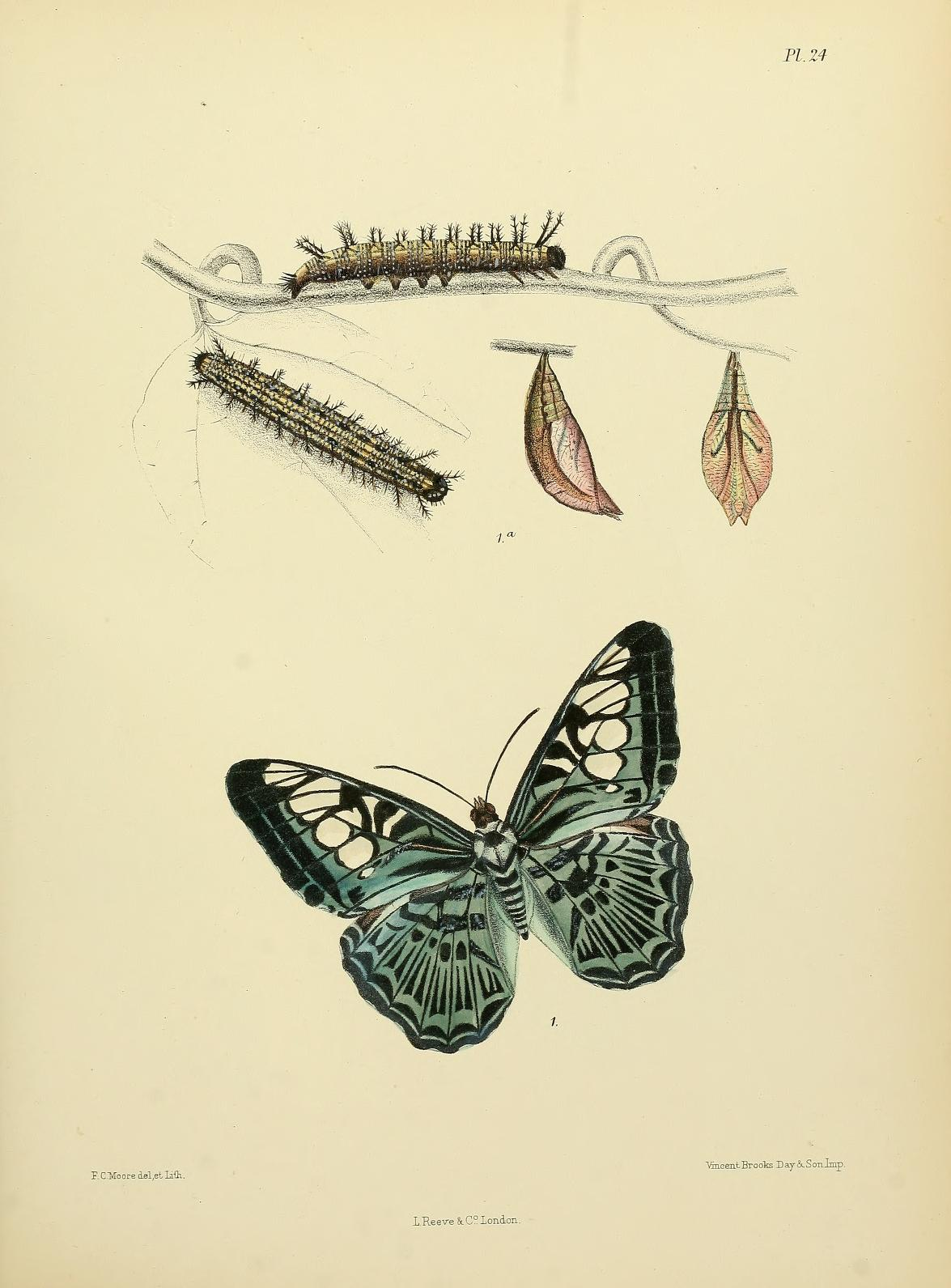
Plate from Frederic Moore's The Lepidoptera of Ceylon depicting the imago, larva and pupa

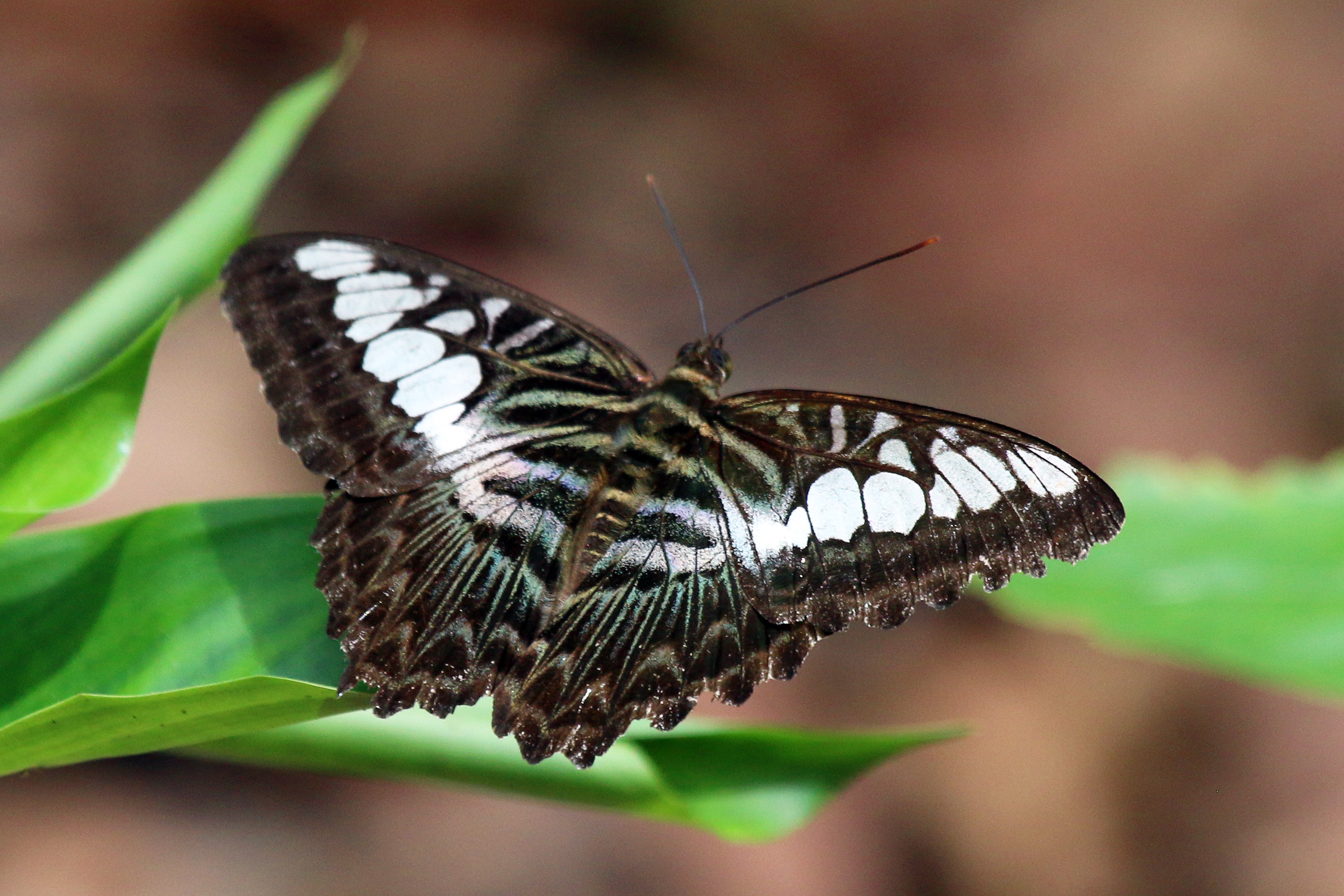
P. s. borneensis, Borneo

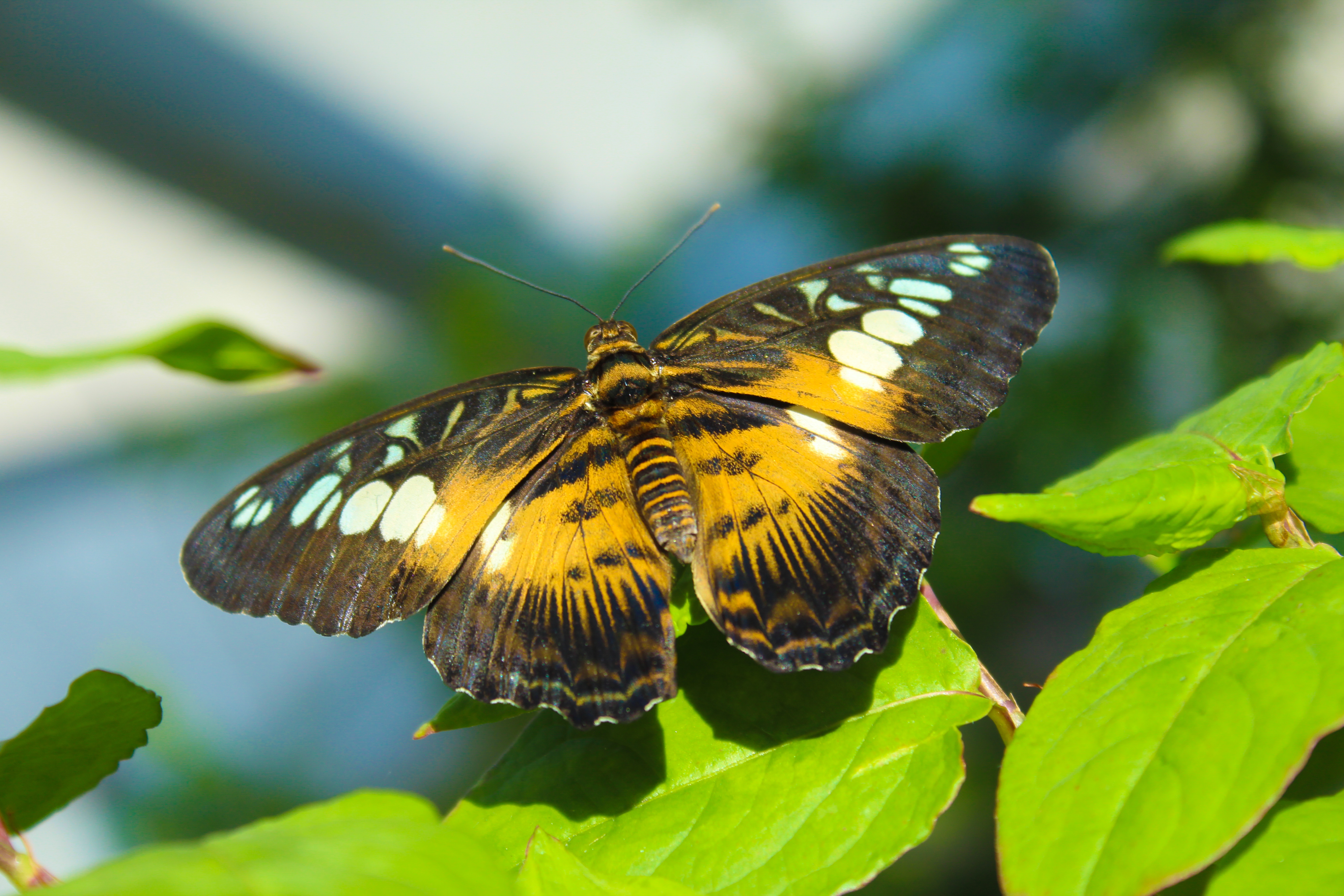
A Parthenos sylvia
