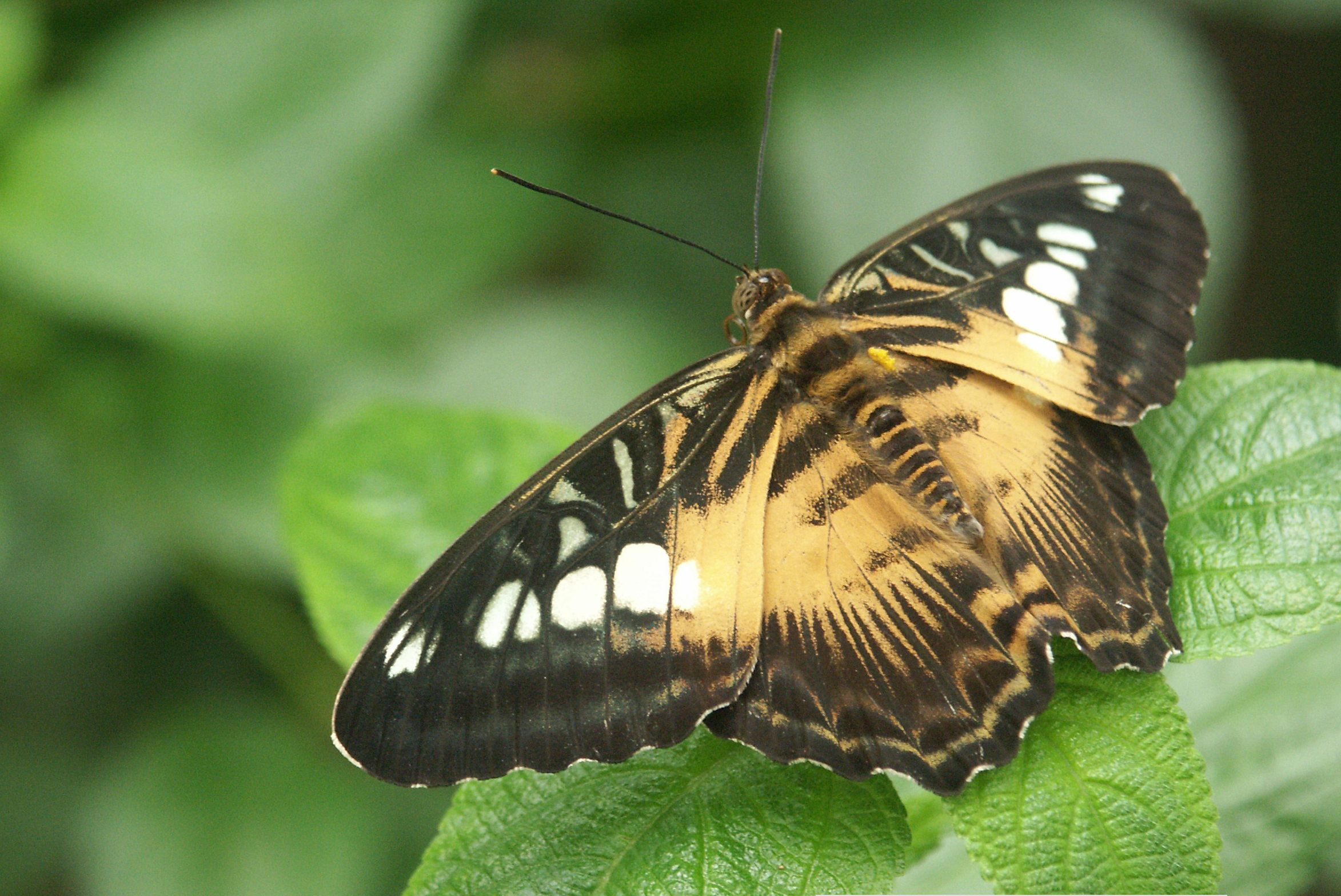
- Parthenos sylvia

Scientific classification
- Domain: Eukaryota
- Kingdom: Animalia
- Phylum: Arthropoda
- Class: Insecta
- Order: Lepidoptera
- Family: Nymphalidae
- Tribe: Parthenini
- Genus: Parthenos; Hübner, [1819]

Species
- Three, see text

= Parthenos (butterfly) =

Clipper butterflies

Genus of brush-footed butterflies

Parthenos, the clippers, are a genus of butterflies found in Southeast Asia.

== Species ==
Listed alphabetically:

Image	Scientific name	Common name	Distribution
	Parthenos aspila Honrath, 1888	New Guinea clipper	endemic to New Guinea and adjacent islands.
	Parthenos sylvia Cramer, 1776	clipper	widespread, occurring from Assam and Burma to Sri Lanka, Indochina, the Philippines, New Guinea and the Solomon Islands
	Parthenos tigrina Vollenhoven, 1866	New Guinea clipper	New Guinea and adjacent islands
