= Honky (disambiguation) =

Honky is a derogatory term applied to people of the European descent in North America.

Honky may also refer to:

== Music ==
- MC Honky, a mysterious musician widely considered to be Mark Oliver Everett, frontman of the band Eels
- Honky (album), a 1997 album by The Melvins
- Honky, a 1981 album by Keith Emerson

== Other uses ==
- Honky (film), a 1971 film
- Honky, a 2001 memoir by Dalton Conley about race relations in New York City
- Honky nuts, the fruit of Corymbia calophylla, an Australian gum tree

== See also ==
- Chicago Honky, a style of polka music
- Hunky (disambiguation)
