= Il dio vagabondo =

Comic book by Fabrizio Dori

- Cover of the book
- Creator: Fabrizio Dori
- Date: 15 November 2018
- Page count: 154 pages
- Publisher: Oblomov Edizioni

Original publication
- Language: Italian
- ISBN: 978-88-85621-64-0

Il dio vagabondo (lit. 'The wandering god') is the third comic book by the Italian writer and artist Fabrizio Dori, published by Oblomov Edizioni in 2018. The story combines a modern setting with Greek mythology and switches between burlesque humour and dramatic content. It follows the satyr Eustis who teams up with an elderly professor and a ghost as he goes on a quest for redemption after the gods have disappeared.

The characters in Il dio vagabondo live on the margins of society, reflecting how ancient Greek ways of viewing mortality and limitations have become marginal. The book was influenced by "Bread and Wine", a poem by Friedrich Hölderlin which is quoted in it. Dori has a background in painting and the art style spans from cartoon-like to realistic. There are visual references to ancient vase painting and to modern art, including Art Nouveau, Vincent van Gogh, Otto Dix and pop art.

The reviews were positive, especially about Il dio vagabondo's visuals, and stressed how the book uses art history and combines ancient mythology with modern content. The book received the Prix Ouest-France at the Quai des Bulles. The standalone sequel Il figlio di Pan (lit. 'The son of Pan') was published in 2023.

== Background ==
Fabrizio Dori worked as a painter for around 10 years before he switched to making comics in his 30s. He lost interest in painting because he wanted to focus more on storytelling. Il dio vagabondo was his third comic book, after Uno in diviso from 2013 and Gauguin: The Other World from 2016.

According to Dori, the starting point for Il dio vagabondo was an image he conceived of a satyr running through nature that is full of life. He quickly made three panels inspired by this image and then developed the script over a year. Drawing and painting took another year.

== Plot ==
In the outskirts of a modern city, the satyr Eustis lives in a tent, drinks wine, sells divinations that are stories he tells when inebriated, and talks about how he used to be part of Dionysus' ecstatic procession, the thiasus. One time in the past, Eustis chased a nymph under the protection of Artemis, and the goddess shot him. When Eustis woke up, his horns and pointed ears were gone and the gods were missing. Unable to find his friends and continue his lifestyle, he wandered the world alone as a vagrant for many centuries, hearing claims that the gods were replaced by a single god and that Pan was dead.

Eustis helps a ghost to find the way and is led to Hecate, making him excited to meet a divinity again. Hecate tells him the gods are still around but Artemis cursed him so he cannot see them. Because he helped one of Hecate's subjects, she breaks the curse until the next full moon, promising it will be permanent if Eustis, within that time, can do a favour for Selene, the sister of Artemis and Hecate. The mission is to convince Hades to release Pan from the underworld for a few hours, allowing Pan and his lover Selene to give each other a proper farewell. Eustis explains his situation to an elderly professor who demands to come along, and the party is soon joined by the ghost from before. The ghost is named Leandros and had been an ancient nobleman whose toothache prevented him from becoming a hero when the chance appeared.

They pass through an old bunker and the kingdom of the invisible, where they learn Hades is looking for an object called the Sphinx. They are guided to the well of Thanatos, which is connected to the well of Hypnos, situated near the house of Ares. When the paranoid Ares leaves for a psychiatrist appointment, they eat of his ambrosia. As they fall asleep, the professor is able to talk to Phantasos, Phobetor and Morpheus, and his knowledge of classics leads him to a revelation about the Sphinx' location. Ares returns and is furious, but Leandros is able to hold up in combat against Alala, the spirit of the war cry, allowing them to escape. Since Leandros has proven his bravery, he can depart.

As they continue, the professor nags about wanting to see the world through Eustis' eyes. Eustis is reluctant, because he once lent his divine vision to a painter named Vincent whose nerves could not handle it. Eustis and the professor arrive at an amusement park which belongs to Aphrodite. Eustis is greeted by Aline, a prostitute who had consulted him for a divination before and now works at the park. The Sphinx is one of the attractions: a small object that always answers truthfully when asked a question, although the answer may not match the question. The professor perishes from one of the park's temptations: a library with every book that exists or will exist. Eustis lends him his vision for a moment before he dies.

Bidding farewell to Aline, Eustis realises it is full moon and hurries to the entrance to the underworld, where Hades greets him and receives the Sphinx. Pan comes out and explains a god cannot die but can lose his place. Pan gives Eustis his satyr appearance back. The moon, who is Selene, comes down, takes Pan with her and breaks Eustis' curse. On his way back, Eustis meets the professor's ghost and the two say farewell. Eustis goes to search for Dionysus and is reunited with the thiasus in a forest.

== Techniques and themes ==
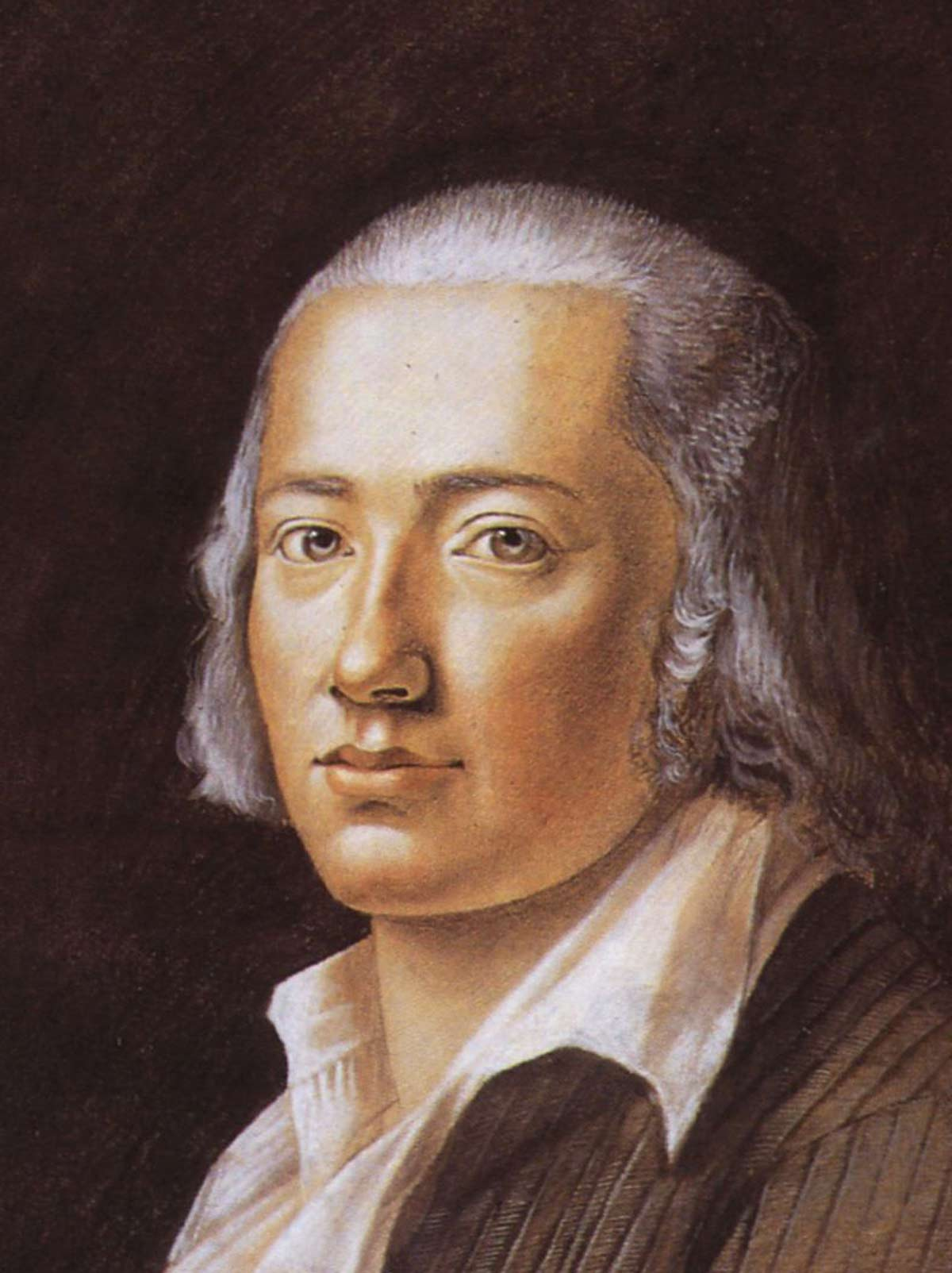
Friedrich Hölderlin's poem "Bread and Wine" is quoted in the book.

Dori names Friedrich Hölderlin's poem "Bread and Wine" as an influence and it is quoted inside Il dio vagabondo. Dori associates the satyr protagonist, and his connection to Dionysus, with theories about the Dionysian spirit laid out by Friedrich Nietzsche in the book The Birth of Tragedy. Homer's Odyssey, with Circe's island, and Carlo Collodi's The Adventures of Pinocchio, with the Land of Toys, were inspirations for Aphrodite's amusement park.

An aim for Dori was to make a comic that is both about mythology and contemporary times. He says Western culture has two origins, ancient Greece and Christianity, and that a major difference is that in the Greek view, the gods are immortal, whereas in Christianity, man is immortal. Dori thought the larger implications of the Greek view of death as a limitation are relevant for the current age, and made it a subject in Il dio vagabondo. Dori says Christianity pushed the Greek view to the margin. In parallel to this, the characters he created for Il dio vagabondo live on the margins of society. The environments were inspired by the area around Dori's home at the outer edge of Milan. Dori draws parallels between the margins of society, the outskirts of a city and how the story of Il dio vagabondo takes place at the fringes of the mind and rationality.

Dori decided after his previous book that his next project should avoid melancholy. He used humour in Il dio vagabondo to add more irrationality and unruliness. The book frequently juxtaposes burlesque, dramatic and horrific elements.

The main character's name, Eustis, is constructed from the Epic Greek word eys, which means "good" or "worthy", and the indefinite pronoun tis, leading to a name that roughly means "someone good". The characters of the professor and the ghost were created to give the story a human perspective. The professor is a human and the ghost has been one. At the same time, the professor sees things in a different way from most humans, suggested by his poor eyesight and his revelatory dream. Dori says it is significant that the professor does not wear glasses during the dream and that they fall off when he dies.

The sequence with the furious Ares contains visual references to the World War I imagery of Otto Dix.

Drawing and painting were done digitally. Dori worked like a painter and began by creating fields of colour which he gave more defined form and eventually outlines. The style shifts between the cartoon-like, grotesque and realistic. There are many nods to artists and art history in Il dio vagabondo. Dori compares the way he uses and reworks his references to making jazz music and to how Quentin Tarantino makes films. There are frequent images that were inspired ancient Greek vase painting. Influences from modern art include Art Nouveau and Vincent van Gogh. References to Van Gogh paintings appear most prominently in a flashback sequence about him. The sunflower field where Eustis has set up camp at the start of the story references Van Gogh's sunflower paintings. There is a war segment with visual references to works by Otto Dix. The design of the amusement park was inspired by pop art, especially that of Takashi Murakami. There are references to Winsor McCay's Little Nemo and to Hokusai. The ghosts who wear skull masks and walk in processions were inspired by the Mexican Day of the Dead.

== Publication ==
Il dio vagabondo was published in Italian by Oblomov Edizioni on 15 November 2018. It is 154 pages long. Éditions Sarbacane published the book in French as Le dieu vagabond on 2 January 2019. Other translations include Dutch (2019), Spanish (2019) and Turkish (2020).

== Reception ==
Tonio Troiani, writing for Fumettologica, called Il dio vagabondo an improvement from Gauguin: The Other World. He wrote that it combines Dori's three passions: art, classicism and pop, and still retains a lightness despite its postmodern games, resulting in a comic that recalls the works of Hayao Miyazaki and Baru. He also praised the book as reminiscent of Neil Gaiman's American Gods and Martin Heidegger's "Only a God Can Save Us". He said Il dio vagabondo is worth reading and looking at multiple times, but a weakness may be that it does not explore the truly dark side of its Dionysian subject. Federico Beghin of Lo spazio bianco called Il dio vagabondo an expression of love for storytelling which manages to be educational but not didactic. He highlighted the interplay between past and present, and between the grand and the ordinary, which exists in both narrative and visuals, calling the result delicate and immediate.

Lise Lamarche of ActuaBD wrote that Il dio vagabondo draws visual inspiration from Van Gogh and Art Nouveau similarly to how Gauguin: The Other World drew from Paul Gauguin, with vibrant and beautiful results. She stressed how there is a constant switching between a mythological level and everyday life and described the book as both funny and gripping. Le Parisien's Christophe Levent described Il dio vagabondo as poetic, dreamlike and colourful, emphasising its humour, mix of styles and disparate references. He called it masterfully made and a beautiful surprise. Anne Douhaire-Kerdoncuff of Radio France wrote that the book's theme of the search for a lost paradise recurs in "all great myths" and called the book "funny, smart, rhythmic, and very original... A big favourite". BoDoï's Benjamin Roure called the book funny, playful and dreamlike. He wrote that it impresses the most with its images, where visual quotations do not feel like stiff homages, but like the participation in a heritage of wondrous pictures. Benoît Cassel wrote for Planète BD that the story is unpredictable and unusual in the way it adapts Greek mythology for current socio-political issues. He called the book both crazy and very successful, due to its colourfulness, attention to detail and stylistic flexibility.

The French edition of Il dio vagabondo was awarded the Prix Ouest-France at the comics festival Quai des Bulles in 2019. Dori was one of six nominees for best Italian single author at the 2019 Treviso Comic Book Festival.

== Sequel ==
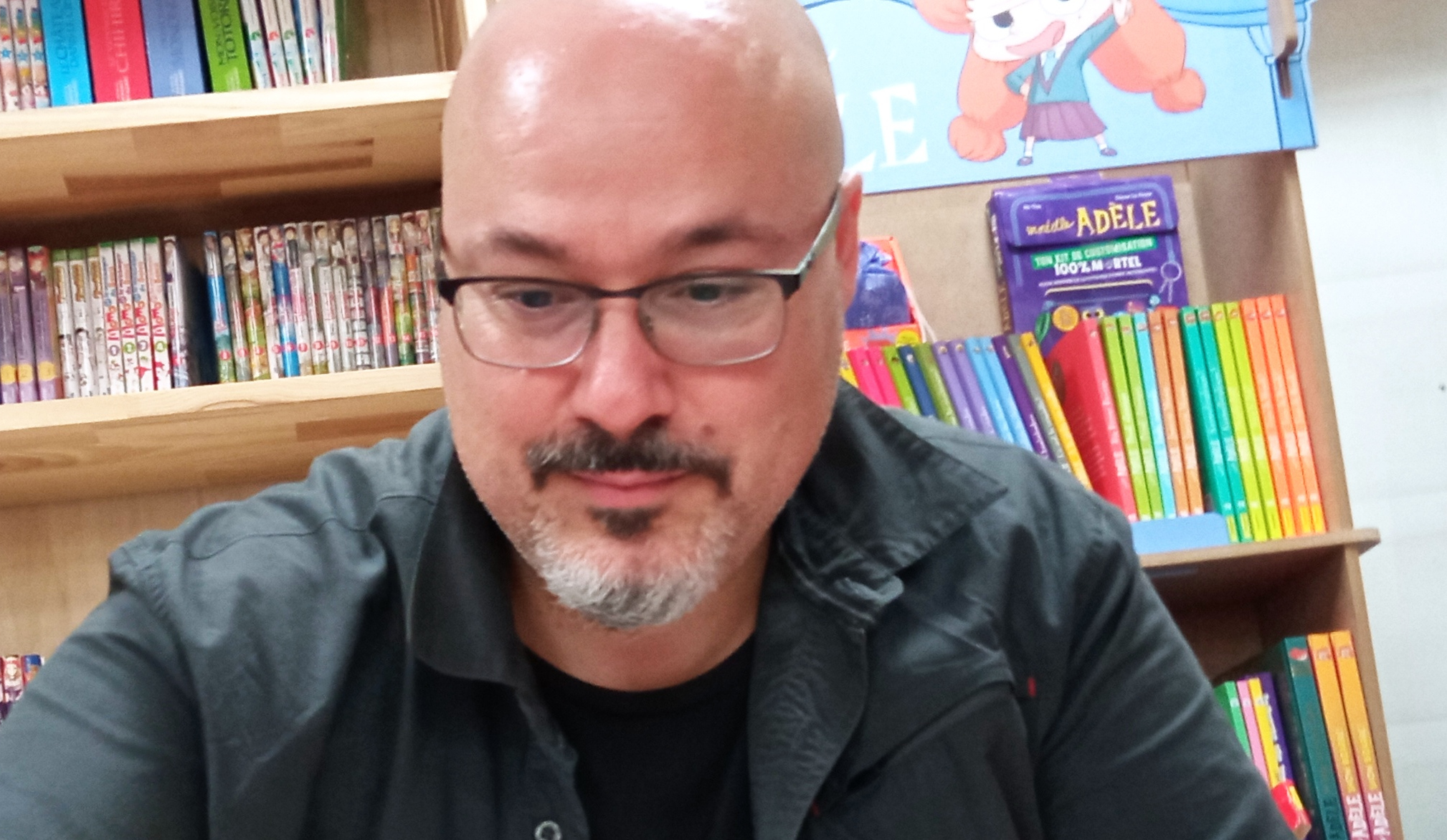
Dori in 2023

Doiri planned Il dio vagabondo as a one-volume work, but his fascination with Greek mythology and investment in the world he had created made him make another comic book about Eustis. Éditions Sarbacane published the sequel in French as Le fils de Pan (lit. 'The son of Pan') on 23 August 2023 and Oblomov Edizioni published it in Italian as Il figlio di Pan on 29 September 2023. It revolves around how Eustis has to educate the son of Pan and Selene, and how the professor's daughter, who works at a large company, finds her father's diary and looks for traces of him. Dori describes the books as standalone works that together form a cycle, where the first ends with death and the second with rebirth.
