= Dorries =

Dorries or Dörries are names. Notable people with the name include:

- Dorries Dlakude, South African Member of Parliament
- Jana Dörries (born 1975), German former swimmer
- Josef Dörries (1923–2007), German World War II and post-war soldier
- Nadine Dorries (born 1957), English Member of Parliament

== See also ==
- Dorrie, name
- Dora (given name)
- Dorie
- Doris (disambiguation)
