= Françoise Thérèse de Voyer de Dorée =

French aristocrat

Françoise Thérèse de Voyer de Dorée, known as Mademoiselle de Dorée (fl. 1712) was a French courtier. She is known for her affair with Louis XIV in 1681.

Dorée was born to René de Voyer, Segnieur de Dorée, Comte de Dorée, a member of the Royal Council, and Diane-Marie Joubert (d. 1683), one of the deputy governesses of the children of the king and Madame de Montespan.

Dorée was the unofficial lover of king Louis XIV in 1681; it was a temporary affair after the death of Marie Angélique de Scorailles. The affair caused a scandal at court and it was rumoured that Madame de Montespan had arranged it to disturb the relationship between the king and Madame de Maintenon. The affair was temporary and ended quickly, and it was said that Madame de Maintenon asked the king to promise afterward that he would no longer sin in the future.

Dorée served as maid of honour to the king's daughter the Duchess of Bourbon between 1685 and 1686. She was banished to a convent in 1686. She was reportedly the mistress of Louis, comte de Cominges, in 1689. She was noted to have been an heir of the will of Cominges upon his death in 1712.
