= Duri (name) =

- Hangul: 두리
- RR: Duri
- MR: Turi

Duri, also spelled Doori, is a Korean given name.

== Meaning ==
Unlike most Korean names, which are composed of two Sino-Korean roots each written with one hanja, "Duri" is an indigenous Korean name. It is a Gyeongsang dialect word for "two", as well as a homophone of a differently-spelled standard Korean word (둘이) meaning "two people" or "a couple". The name was attested as early as the 19th century, and is one of a number of indigenous names which became more popular in South Korea in the late 20th century.

The name Duri could also be recorded in hanja which are picked solely for their sound and not for their meaning (for example, 斗里 or 乧伊).

== People ==
People with this name include:

- Doo-Ri Chung (born 1973), Korean-American fashion designer
- Cha Du-ri (born 1980), South Korean football player
- Kim Du-ri, South Korean archer

=== Fictional ===
Fictional characters name include:

- Doori Koo, a protagonist of the South Korean animated series The Haunted House

== See also ==
- List of Korean given names
