= Jean Dorey =

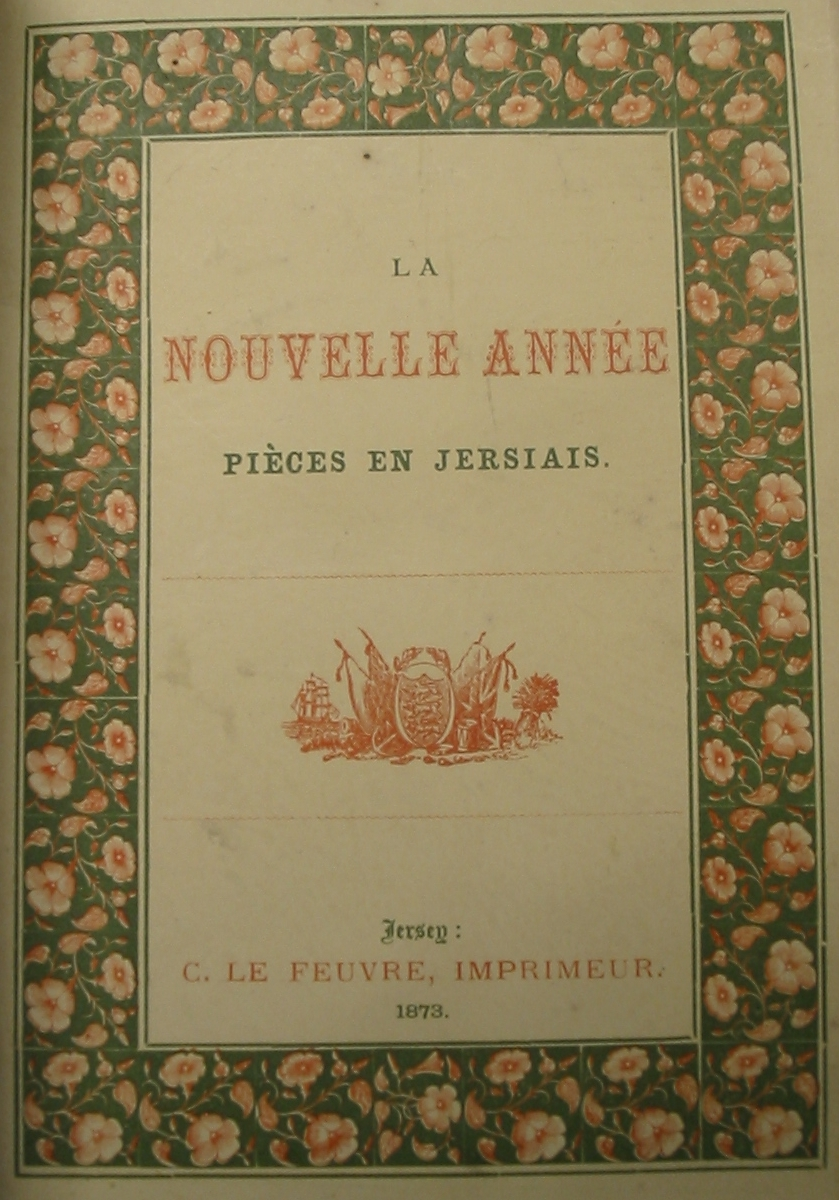
La Nouvelle Année

Jean Dorey (27 January 1831 of Ville-ès-Nouaux in Saint-Hélier–23 August 1872) was a Norman language writer from Jersey.

Of a family of La Blanche Pierre in the parish of St. Lawrence, Jean Dorey wrote under the pen names of JD, JDR and Jean des Ruettes in Jèrriais, in French and in English. He wrote sometimes in a phonetic version of Jerriais. A number of his short poems were published in the Nouvelle Année around 1870. He was also the author of a book. A number of saying, nursery rhymes, and poems were left in a manuscript which passed to Fraînque Le Maistre and is today in the library of the Société Jersiaise.

He was an author in French and English of historical, genealogical and art articles on various subjects. During the course of his life, he worked with the Chronique de Jersey (Jersey Chronicle), Jersey Independent, l'Imprimerie de l'International in London and also Le Phare de la Loire in France.
