= Fabrizio Dori =

Italian comics artist

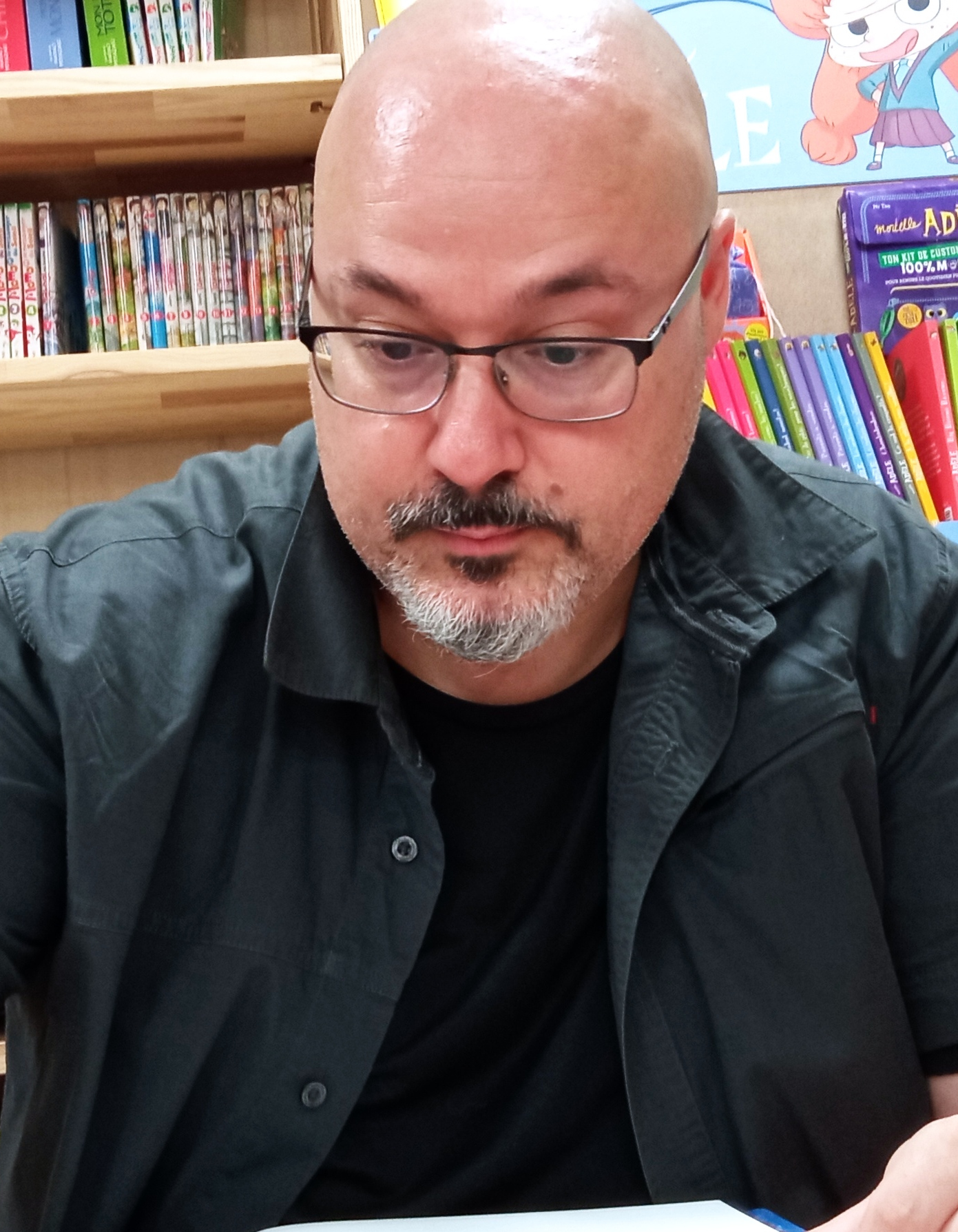
Fabrizio Dori in 2023

Fabrizio Dori is an Italian comics artist. He started as a painter but switched to comics to focus on storytelling. His works include the comic books Gauguin: The Other World (2016), which is about the artist Paul Gauguin, and Il dio vagabondo (2018) and Il figlio di Pan (2023), which are about a satyr in the modern world. Several of his works concern issues of modernity and meaning.

== Life and work ==
Fabrizio Dori studied art at the Brera Academy in Milan in the early 2000s. He worked as a painter for around a decade, exhibiting works that mixed figurative and abstract techniques. He has named Marcel Duchamp as an influence and made what he calls "colourful, but rather cold" paintings of impossible architecture and machines.

Dori had read comics as a child but lost interest as a teenager. He rediscovered the format in his 30s and published his first comic book, Uno in diviso (lit. 'One divided'), in 2013. He made a biographical comic book about the French painter Paul Gauguin, Gauguin: The Other World, published in 2016. The pictures and colours are inspired by Gauguin's paintings. SelfMadeHero published it in English in 2017, as part of a series of biographical comics about artists.

In 2018, Dori published Il dio vagabondo (lit. 'The wandering god'), a comic book about the satyr Eustis who is left wandering the modern world, searching for traces of Greek mythology. Dori intended it as a single volume, but his fascination with Greek mythology prompted him to make a second comic book about the same character, Il figlio di Pan (lit. 'The son of Pan'), which was published in 2023. The Eustis books can be read as two standalone works that together form a cycle. Dori describes the first as a brightly coloured work that begins in the summer and journeys toward death, whereas the second begins during a winter night and moves toward spring and rebirth.

The comic book Le Divin Scénario (lit. 'The Divine Scenario'), with a script by Jacky Beneteaud and art by Dori, was published in 2021. It is a comedic story about the archangel Gabriel and the Annunciation. The art is inspired by Art Nouveau.

A recurring theme in Dori's works is an unbalance in the modern age and human struggles to fill the voids left with the disappearance of pre-Christian religions. In his treatment of Gauguin, he stresses that Gauguin's decision to leave the West partially was about the divinities of Polynesia. Dori is critical of what he views of unsuccessful attempts to fill these voids with things that are not sacred, such as political cults of personality, profit or consumption. His own suggestions for what can create balance include dreams, poetry and myths. He says he abandoned painting because he felt it did not bring any meaning, and that only storytelling can do that. He says it is important to interpret and use symbols; among his influences for this, he names Friedrich Hölderlin, "The Gods in Exile" by Heinrich Heine, The Birth of Tragedy by Friedrich Nietzsche, and theories by Carl Jung and James Hillman.

== Selected publications ==
- Uno in diviso, 2013
- Gauguin: The Other World (Gauguin. L'autre monde), 2016, in English 2017
- Il dio vagabondo, 2018
- Le Divin Scénario, 2021
- Il figlio di Pan, 2023
