= Lewis Dorey =

English cricketer and printer

Personal information
- Full name: Lewis Hugh John Dorey
- Born: 23 October 1901; St Albans, Hertfordshire, England
- Died: 31 July 1958 (aged 56); Belmont, Surrey, England
- Batting: Right-handed

Domestic team information
- Years: Team
- 1912: Hampshire

Career statistics
Competition	First-class
Matches	1
Runs scored	0
Batting average	0.00
100s/50s	–/–
Top score	0
Catches/stumpings	1/–
- Source: Cricinfo, 12 December 2009

Lewis Hugh John Dorey MBE (23 October 1901 — 31 July 1958) was an English first-class cricketer and printer.

The son of the printing press owner Henry Vaughan Dorey, he was born at St Albans in October 1901. Dorey was educated at Harrow School, before matriculating to Pembroke College, Oxford. He later made a single appearance in first-class cricket for Hampshire against Leicestershire at Ashby-de-la-Zouch in the 1912 County Championship. He batted twice in the match and was dismissed without scoring in both innings, by Ewart Astill and Haydon Smith.

Dorey later took over his father's editorship of the weekly magazine Lawn Tennis and Badminton. By 1939, he was in business as a printer with The Morland Press. During the Second World War, Dorey was a Divisional Officer (Chief Clerk) at the headquarters of the National Fire Service in London. For his service with the Fire Service during the Second World War, he was made an MBE in the 1946 New Year Honours. Dorey died in July 1958 at Belmont, Surrey.
