= SS Eastern =

History
- Name: Empire Dynasty (1944–46); Eastern (1946–65); Dori (1965–67)
- Owner: Ministry of War Transport (1944–46); Eastern & Australian Steamship Co Ltd (1946–65); Eddie Steamship Co Ltd (1965–67)
- Operator: Lamport and Holt Line (1944–46); Eastern & Australian Steamship Co Ltd (1946–65); WH Eddie Hsu (1965–67)
- Port of registry: (United Kingdom) Sunderland (1944–46); (United Kingdom) UK (1946–65); Hong Kong (1965–67)
- Builder: JL Thompson & Sons Ltd
- Launched: 22 May 1944
- Completed: November 1944
- Maiden voyage: 21 November 1944
- Out of service: 4 July 1967
- Identification: UK official number 180145 (1944–65); call sign GFTV (1944–65)
- Fate: Scrapped

General characteristics
- Class & type: Cargo liner
- Tonnage: 9,905 GRT; tonnage under deck 8,891; 7,107 NRT; 13,530 DWT
- Length: 475 ft (145 m)
- Beam: 65 ft (20 m)
- Draught: 42 feet 8 inches (13.00 m)
- Depth: 40.0 metres (131 ft 3 in)
- Decks: 2
- Propulsion: 2 × steam turbines
- Sensors & processing systems: wireless direction finding, echo sounding device, gyrocompass

Eastern was a 9,905 GRT cargo liner that was built in 1944 as Empire Dynasty by J.L. Thompson and Sons, Sunderland, Co Durham, United Kingdom for the Ministry of War Transport (MoWT). The ship was sold into merchant service in 1946 and renamed Eastern A sale to Hong Kong in 1965 saw her renamed Dori. She was sold for scrap in July 1967.

== Description ==
The ship was built in 1944 by J.L. Thompson and Sons, Sunderland, Co Durham. Her yard number was 631. The ship was 475.4 feet (144.9 m) long, with a beam of 64.1 feet (19.5 m). She had a depth of 40.0 metres (131 ft 3 in) and draught of 42 feet 8 inches (13.0 m). She was assessed at 9,905 GRT, 7,107 NRT, 8,891 tonnage under deck and 13,530 DWT.

The ship was driven by twin steam turbines, double reduction geared, driving a single screw. The turbines were made by Richardsons Westgarth & Company, Hartlepool, County Durham and between them they developed 1,226 NHP. Two water-tube boilers supplied the turbines with steam at 490 lb_{f}/in^{2}.

== History ==
Empire Dynasty was built in 1943 by J.L. Thompson and Sons, Sunderland, Co Durham, for the MoWT. She was completed in November. She was given the United Kingdom official number 180145 and call sign GFTV. Her port of registry was Sunderland. She was placed under the management of Lamport and Holt Line Ltd.

Empire Dynasty was towed from Sunderland to the Tyne on 3 June 1944. She underwent trials on 19 November before departing from the Tyne on 21 November to join Convoy FN 1547, which had departed from Southend, Essex the previous day and arrived at Methil, Fife on 22 November. She departed from Methil on 24 December as a member of Convoy FS 1676, which arrived at Southend on 26 December. She then joined Convoy UC 50B, which departed from Liverpool, Lancashire on 28 December and arrived at New York, United States on 8 January 1945. Empire Dynasty put into Milford Haven, Pembrokeshire with defects, arriving on 1 January.

Empire Dynasty departed from Milford Haven on 11 January to join Convoy UC 52A, which departed from Liverpool on 10 January and arrived at New York on 21 January. She arrived at St Helena on 24 January, departing the next day for Cape Town, South Africa, where she arrived on 31 January. She departed on 7 February for Port Elizabeth, arriving the next day and sailing two days later for Durban, where she arrived on 11 February. Empire Dynasty departed on 16 February for Beira, Mozambique, arriving on 18 February. She departed on 24 February for Lourenço Marques, arriving two days later. She sailed on 3 March for Durban, arriving the next day and sailing on 10 March for Cape Town, where she arrived on 12 March. Empire Dynasty departed from Cape Town on 18 March and sailed to Walvis Bay, South-West Africa, where she arrived on 20 March, departing six days later for Gibraltar, arriving on 8 April. Carrying general cargo and 1,645 long tons (1,671 t) of mails, she departed from Gibraltar on 12 April as a member of Convoy MKF 42, which arrived at Liverpool on 17 April.

On 14 May 1945, Supermarine Spitfire Mk. FRXIV NM817 was loaded aboard Empire Dynasty. She was a member of Convoy UC 68A, which departed from Liverpool on 17 May and arrived at New York on 28 May. She detached from the convoy and sailed to Port Said, Egypt, arriving on 28 May. Empire Dynasty then sailed to Suez, from where she departed on 29 May for Aden, arriving on 2 June and departing that day for Bombay, India, arriving on 7 June. The Spitfire was unloaded here. Empire Dynasty departed from Bombay on 8 July and sailed to Beira, arriving on 17 July. She departed on 26 July for Durban, arriving two days later and departing on 4 August for Cape Town, where she arrived on 7 August. She departed on 12 August for London, arriving on 30 August.

Empire Dynasty departed from London on 19 October for Gibraltar, where she arrived on 23 October, departing the next day for Port Said. She arrived there on 31 October and the sailed to Suez, from where she departed on 1 November for Bombay, arriving on 11 November. She departed on 2 December for Karachi, arriving two days later. Empire Dynasty departed from Karachi on 7 December for Bombay, from where she departed on 15 December for Suez, arriving on 25 December. She then sailed to Port Said, from where she sailed on 26 December for Haifa, Palestine, arriving the next day.

In May 1946 Empire Dynasty was sold to the Eastern & Australian Steamship Co Ltd and was renamed Eastern. On 8 January 1953 the Swedish cargo ship Avanti broke in two off Okinawa, Japan. Eleven crew rescued by Eastern and 21 by Kanazu Maru. On 26 September 1954 Eastern was on a voyage from Yokohama to Kure, Japan when she was caught in Typhoon Marie, suffering some damage.

In 1965 Eastern was sold to Eddie Steamship Co Ltd, Hong Kong and renamed Dori. She was operated under the management of WH Eddie Hsu. Dori was sold for scrap on 4 July 1967 while lying at Kaohsiung, Taiwan.
