= Beck Dorey-Stein =

American author and stenographer

- Born: Rebecca Dorey-Stein; Narberth, Pennsylvania, U.S.
- Education: Wesleyan University
- Occupations: author, stenographer
- Years active: 2012–present

Beck Dorey-Stein (born June 11, 1986) is an American author who served as a stenographer in the White House from 2012 to 2017 under U.S. Presidents Barack Obama and Donald Trump. She is the author of the non-fiction book From the Corner of the Oval: A Memoir, which recounts her experiences while providing stenography services to Presidents Obama and Trump, and the novels Rock the Boat and Spectacular Things. Dorey-Stein was one of three stenographers who traveled with the president.
