= Dorie =

Dorie may refer to:

- Pierre-Henri Dorie (1839–1866), French missionary and martyr in Korea
- Dorie Greenspan, American author of cookbooks
- Dorie Murrey (born 1943), American retired National Basketball Association player
- Doris Miller (1919-1943), nicknamed "Dorie", African-American US Navy cook who distinguished himself during the attack on Pearl Harbor
- Dorie Goodwyn, a.k.a. Doremi Harukaze, the title character of the anime series Ojamajo Doremi

== See also ==
- Dori (disambiguation)
- Dory (disambiguation)
- Dorrie, a list of people and fictional characters with either the given name or surname
- Dorries, a list of people with the surname
