= Hunky Dory (disambiguation) =

Hunky Dory is a 1971 David Bowie album.

Hunky dory may also refer to:

- Hunky Dory (film), a 2011 British independent musical film
- Hunky Dory Trail, in the Rocky Mountains
- Hunky Dorys Park, another name for United Park in Drogheda
