= Dory =

Dory most commonly refers to:

- Dory (boat), a small, shallow-draft boat
- Dory, the common name of several fish; see List of fishes known as dory
- Dory (Finding Nemo), a fictional character

Dory may also refer to:

== Arts and entertainment ==
- "Dory", a song from the 2009 album Veckatimest by Grizzly Bear

== People ==
- Dory Chamoun (born 1931), Lebanese politician
- Dory Dean (1852–1935), American baseball player
- Dory Dixon (born 1935), Jamaican wrestler
- Dory Funk (1919–1973), American wrestler
  - Dory Funk Jr. (born 1941), American wrestler, son of Dory Funk
- Dory Lobel (born 1980), American musician
- Dory Previn (1925–2012), American singer songwriter
- Jonathan Dory (born 1975), American space scientist
- William Dory, American Yiddish-language recording artist

== Places ==
- Dory Nunatak, in Victoria Land, Antarctica
- Dory or Doros, Byzantine name for Mangup, a fortress in Crimea

== Other uses ==
- Dory (spear), chief weapon of ancient Greek hoplites
- Dory, nickname for Google Moderator, a discontinued question-answering service
- Dory, code name of the LG G Watch

== See also ==
- Dori (disambiguation)
- Dorie, a name
- Dory Fish Market, in Newport Beach, California, U.S.
- Dory Rips, a phenomenon in the Bay of Fundy
- Hunky Dory (disambiguation)
