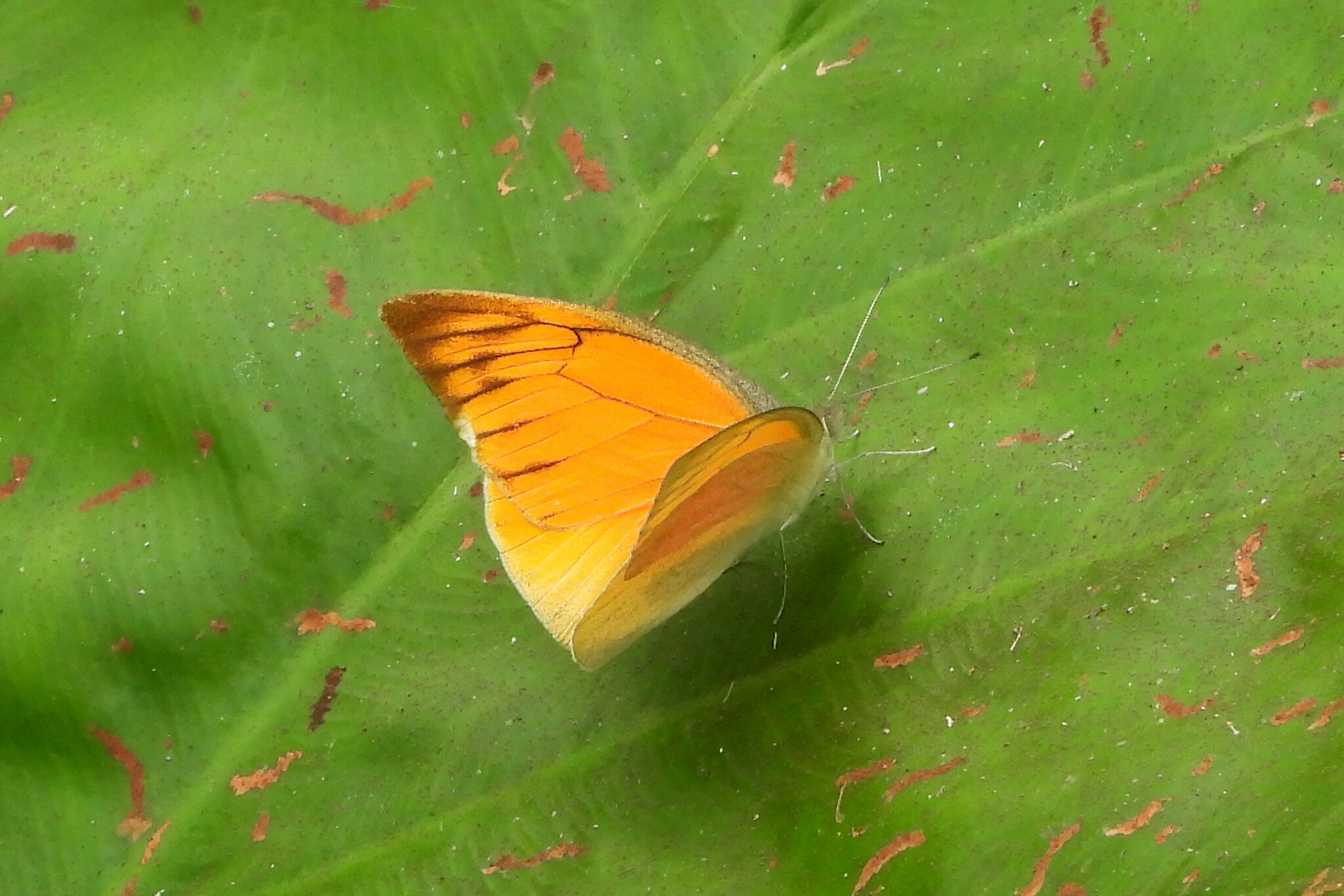
- Upperside
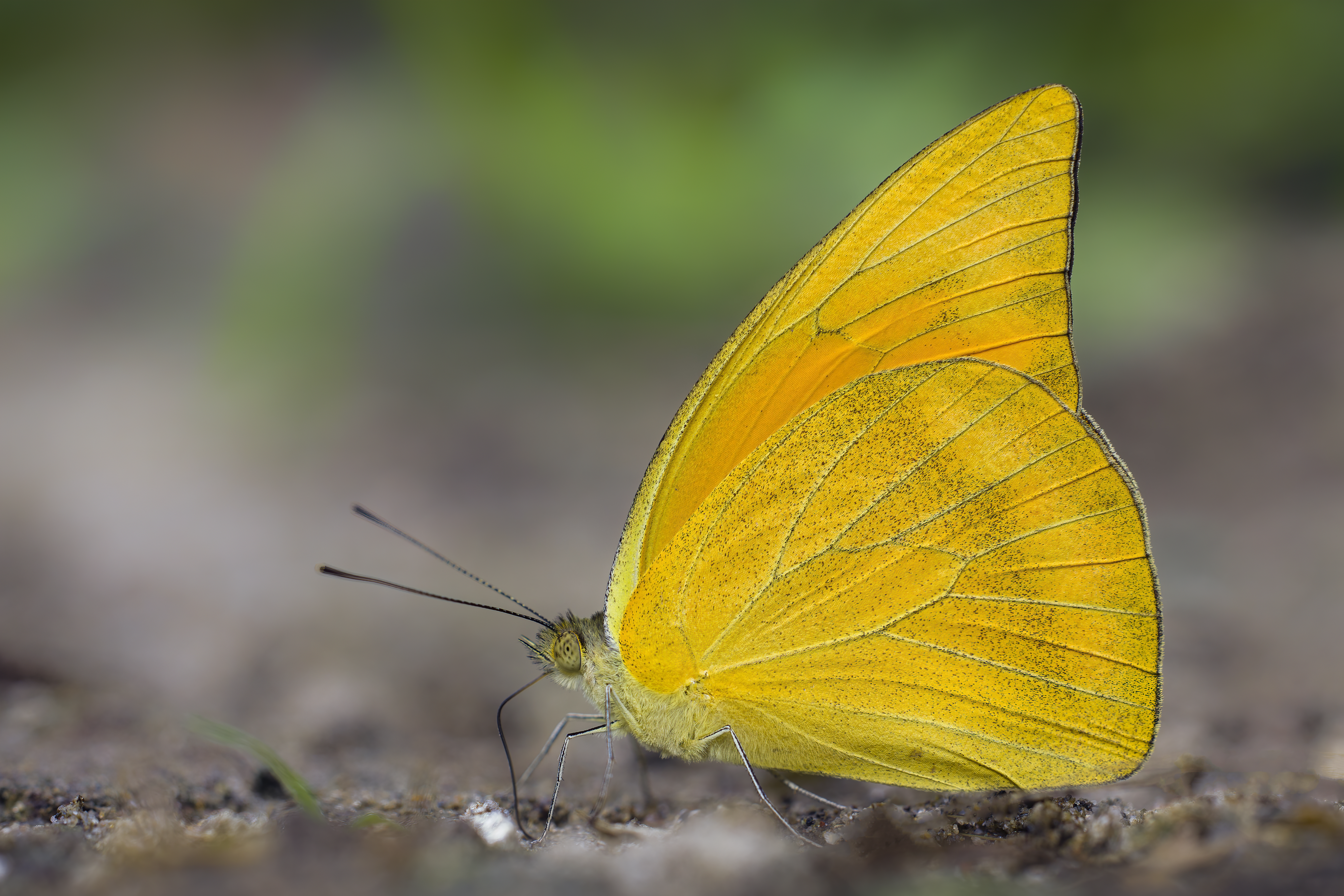
- Underside

Scientific classification
- Kingdom: Animalia
- Phylum: Arthropoda
- Clade: Pancrustacea
- Class: Insecta
- Order: Lepidoptera
- Family: Pieridae
- Genus: Appias
- Species: A. galba

Binomial name
- Appias galba Wallace, 1867

= Appias galba =

Species of butterfly

Appias galba, also known as the Indian orange albatross, is a butterfly in the family Hesperiidae. It is found in North-east India east to Vietnam and Hainan. It was discovered by Alfred Russel Wallace in 1867.

== Description ==
The wings are more acute than Appias nero and less acute than Appias zarinda. The upperside is similar to Appias nero. The upperside hindwing has a narrow border made of spots. The underside is similar to Appias nero except that the submarginal sports on the forewing are less defined and farther from the margin. The antennae are black and ringed with white, and the abdomen is green above and white below.
