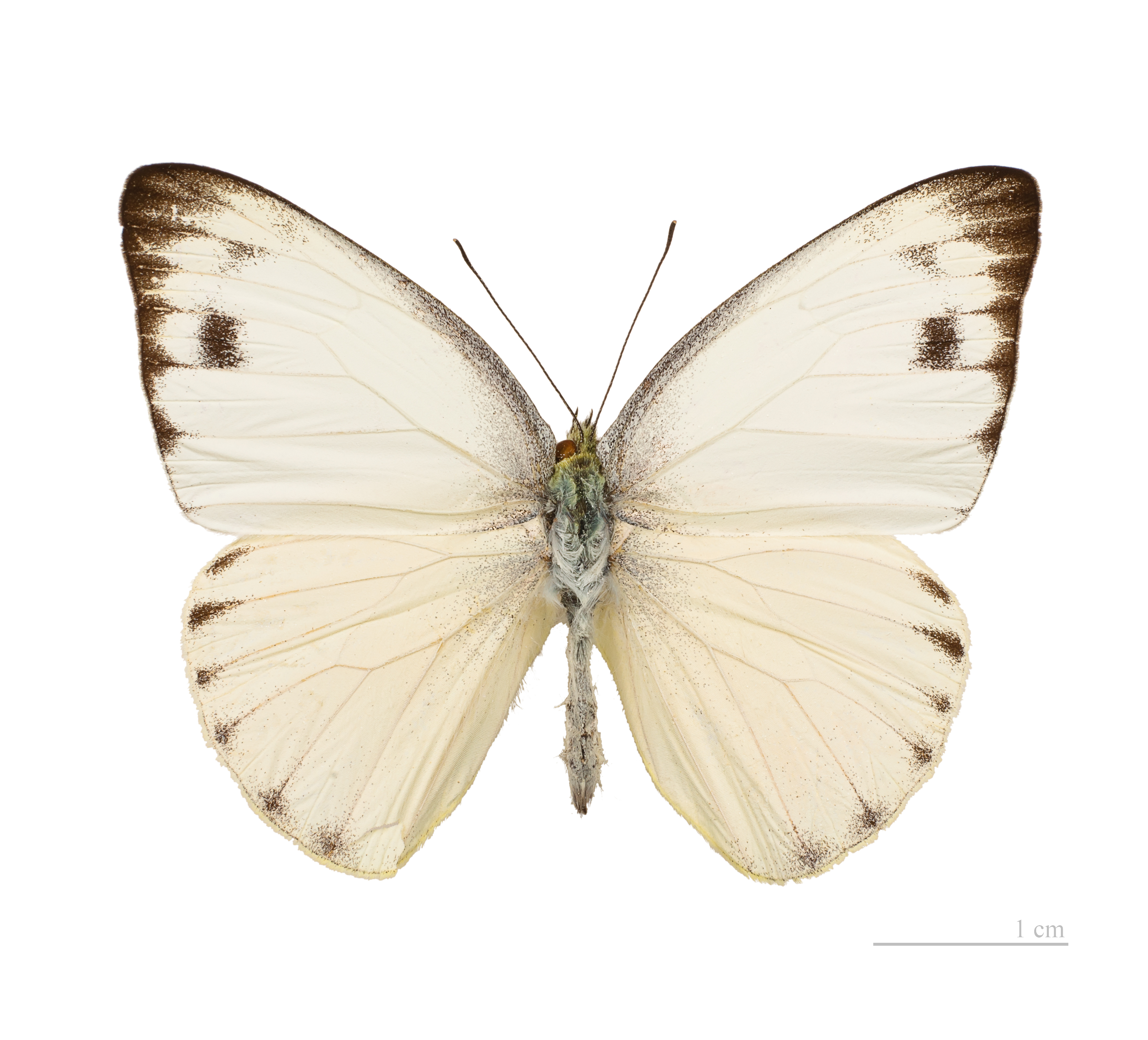
- Appias phoebe

Scientific classification
- Kingdom: Animalia
- Phylum: Arthropoda
- Clade: Pancrustacea
- Class: Insecta
- Order: Lepidoptera
- Family: Pieridae
- Subfamily: Pierinae
- Tribe: Pierini
- Genus: Appias; Hübner, [1819]

Synonyms
- Catophaga Hübner, [1819]; Hiposcritia Geyer, [1832]; Trigonia Geyer, [1837]; Tachyris Wallace, 1867; Andopodum Scudder, 1875 (preocc. Hübner, 1822); Glutophrissa Butler, 1887; Lade de Nicéville, 1898

= Appias (butterfly) =

Butterfly genus in family Pieridae

Appias, commonly called puffins or albatrosses, is a genus of butterflies in the subfamily Pierinae (whites) found in Africa and southern Asia.

== Species ==
Listed alphabetically:

- Appias ada (Stoll, [1781]) – rare albatross
- Appias aegis (Felder, C & R Felder, 1861) – forest white (See as Phrissura aegis)
- Appias albina (Boisduval, 1836) – white albatross
- Appias aroa (Ribbe, 1900)
- Appias athama (Blanchard, 1848)
- Appias caeca Corbet, 1941
- Appias cardena (Hewitson, [1861])
- Appias celestina (Boisduval, 1832) – common migrant
- Appias clementina (Felder, C, 1860)
- Appias dolorosa Fruhstorfer, 1910
- Appias drusilla (Cramer, [1777]) – Florida white or tropical white
- Appias epaphia (Cramer, [1779]) – diverse albatross or African albatross
- Appias galba (Wallace, [1867]) – indian orange albatross
- Appias galene (Felder, C & R Felder, 1865)
- Appias hombroni (Lucas, 1852)
- Appias inanis van Eecke, 1913
- Appias indra (Moore, 1857) – plain puffin
- Appias ithome (C. & R. Felder, 1859)
- Appias lalage (Doubleday, 1842) – spot puffin
- Appias lalassis Grose-Smith, 1887
- Appias lasti (Grose-Smith, 1889) – Last's albatross
- Appias leis (Geyer, [1832])
- Appias libythea (Fabricius, 1775) – striped albatross
- Appias lyncida (Cramer, [1777]) – vibrant chocolate albatross
- Appias maria (Semper, 1875)
- Appias mata Kheil, 1884
- Appias melania (Fabricius, 1775) – grey albatross
- Appias nephele Hewitson, [1861]
- Appias nero (Fabricius, 1793) – orange albatross
- Appias nupta (Fruhstorfer, 1897)
- Appias olferna Swinhoe, 1890 – eastern striped albatross
- Appias panda Fruhstorfer, 1903 – Nicobar albatross
- Appias pandione (Geyer, [1832])
- Appias paulina (Cramer, [1777]) – yellow albatross
- Appias perlucens (Butler, 1898)
- Appias phaola (Doubleday, 1847) – dirty albatross or Congo white
- Appias phoebe (C. & R. Felder, 1861)
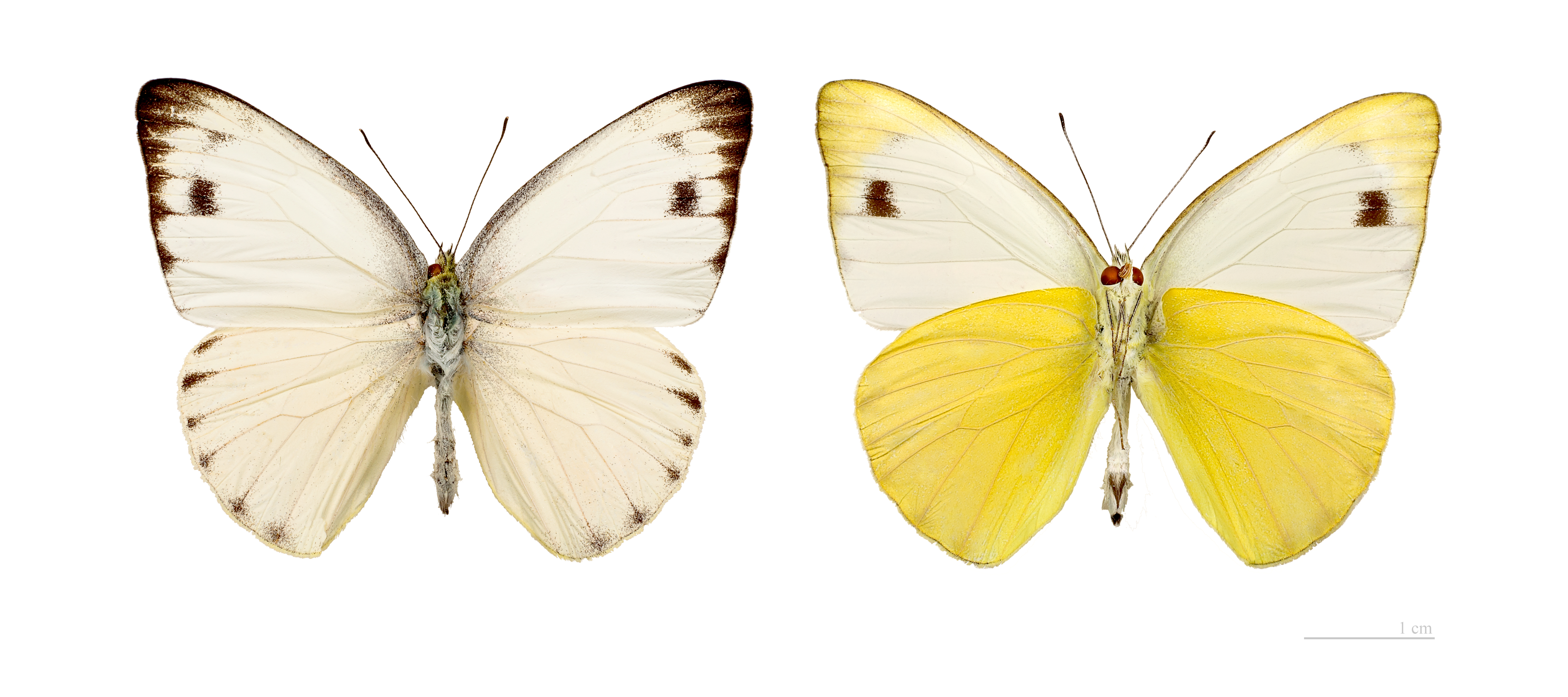
  Appias phoebe
- Appias placidia (Stoll, [1790]) – chocolate albatross
- Appias punctifera d'Almeida, 1939
- Appias remedios Schröder & Treadaway, 1990
- Appias sabina (C. & R. Felder, [1865]) – Sabine albatross or albatross white
- Appias sylvia (Fabricius, 1775) – woodland white or common albatross
- Appias waltraudae Schröder, 1977
- Appias wardii (Moore, 1884) – lesser albatross
- Appias zarinda (Boisduval, 1836) – eastern orange albatross
