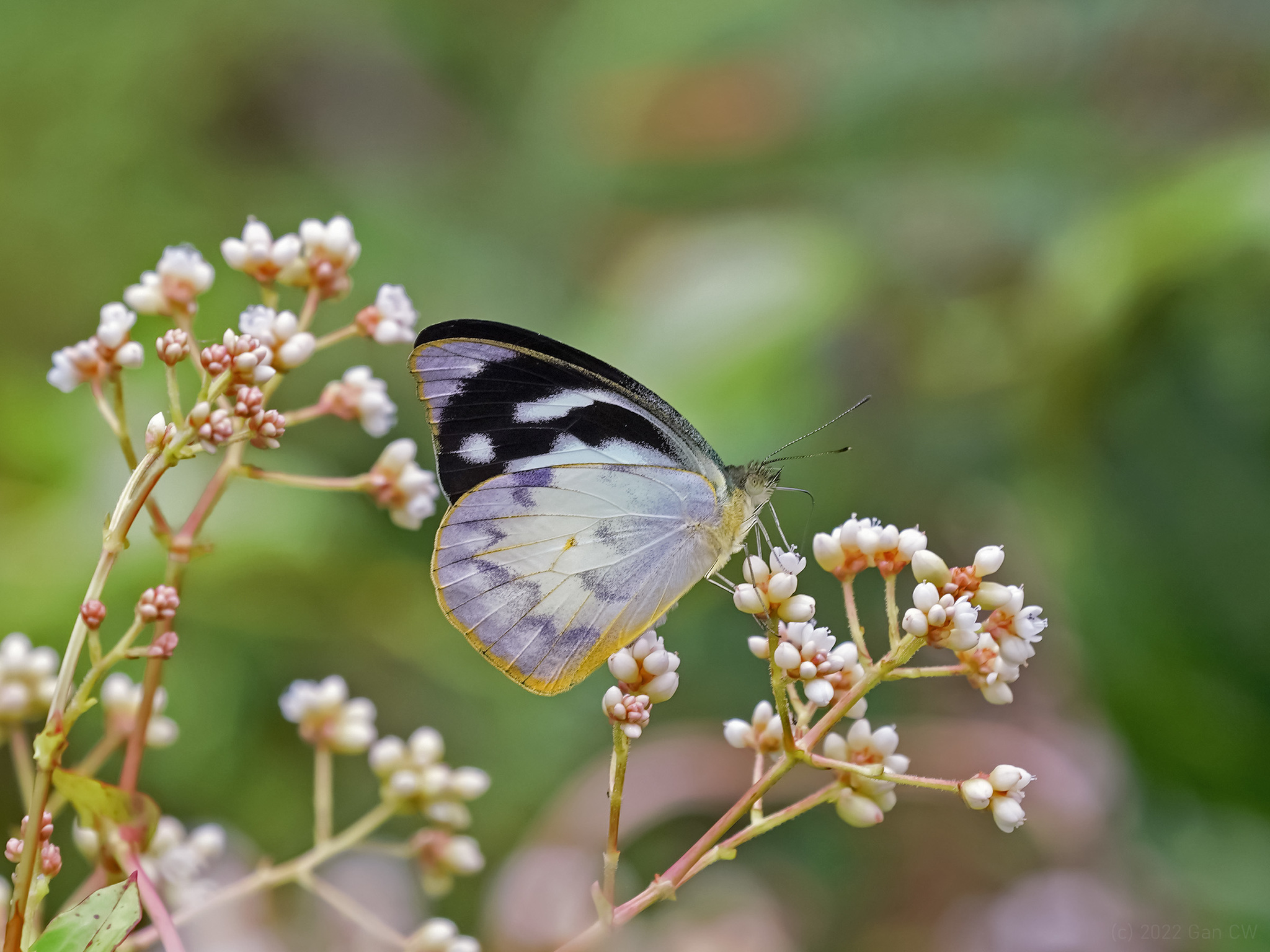

Scientific classification
- Kingdom: Animalia
- Phylum: Arthropoda
- Clade: Pancrustacea
- Class: Insecta
- Order: Lepidoptera
- Family: Pieridae
- Genus: Appias
- Species: A. pandione

Binomial name
- Appias pandione (Geyer, 1832)

Synonyms
- Hiposcritia pandione Geyer, [1832]; Appias whiteheadi Grose-Smith, 1887; Catophaga lagela Moore, 1878; Appias lalage aornus Fruhstorfer, 1913; Appias montanus Rothschild, 1896; Tachyris zamora C. & R. Felder, 1862

= Appias pandione =

Species of butterfly

Appias pandione is a butterfly in the family Pieridae. It was described by Carl Geyer in 1832. It is found in the Indomalayan realm.

== Subspecies ==
- A. p. pandione (Java)
- A. p. ozolia Fruhstorfer, 1910 (Sumatra)
- A. p. whiteheadi Grose-Smith, 1887 (northern Borneo)
- A. p. lagela (Moore, 1878) (southern Burma to Peninsular Malaysia)
- A. p. montanus Rothschild, 1896 (Philippines: Negros)
- A. p. zamora (C. & R. Felder, 1862) (Philippines: Mindoro)
