= Appias maria =

Scientific classification
- Kingdom: Animalia
- Phylum: Arthropoda
- Class: Insecta
- Order: Lepidoptera
- Family: Pieridae
- Genus: Appias
- Species: A. maria

Binomial name
- Appias maria (Semper, 1875)

Synonyms
- Tachyris maria Semper, 1875; Appias celestina kabiraensis Murayama, 1970

Species of butterfly

Appias maria is a species of pierine butterfly found in the Philippines and Japan.

== Subspecies ==
- Appias maria adorabilis Fruhstorfer, 1910 (Philippines: Mindanao)
- Appias maria dolorosa Fruhstorfer, 1910 (Bohol, Bazilan)
- Appias maria kabiraensis Murayama, 1970 (Japan)
- Appias maria kobayashii Nuyda & Kawamura, 1989 (Japan)
- Appias maria maria (Semper, 1875) (Philippines: Luzon)
