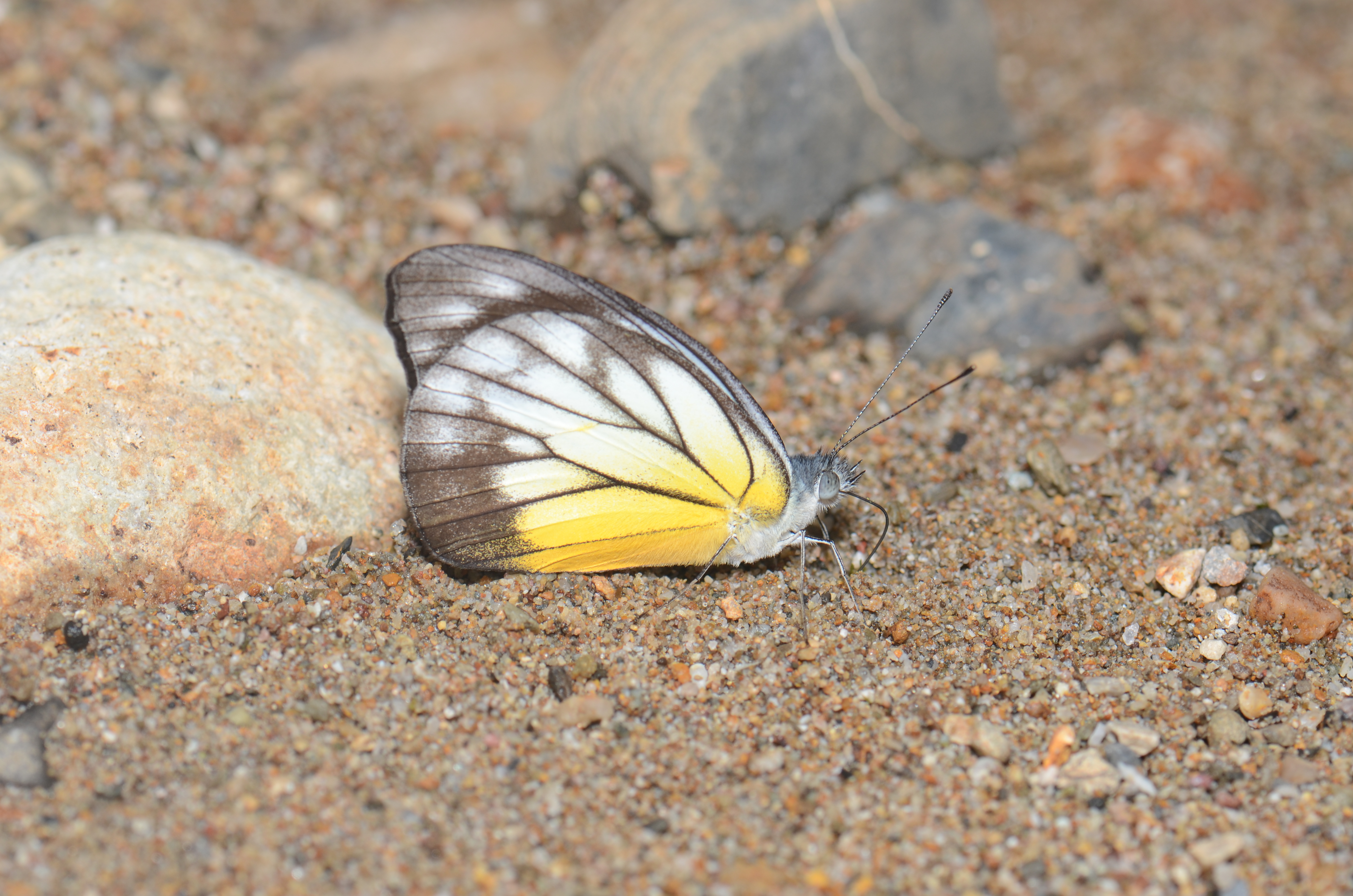

Scientific classification
- Kingdom: Animalia
- Phylum: Arthropoda
- Clade: Pancrustacea
- Class: Insecta
- Order: Lepidoptera
- Family: Pieridae
- Genus: Appias
- Species: A. cardena

Binomial name
- Appias cardena (Hewitson, 1861)

Synonyms
- Pieris cardena Hewitson, 1861; Tachyris cardena perakana Fruhstorfer, 1902; Pieris hagar Vollenhoven, 1865

= Appias cardena =

Yellow puffin

Species of butterfly

Appias cardena, the yellow puffin, is a butterfly in the family Pieridae. It was described by William Chapman Hewitson in 1861. It is found in the Indomalayan realm.

== Subspecies ==
- A. c. cardena (northern Borneo)
- A. c. perakana (Fruhstorfer, 1902) (Peninsular Malaysia, possibly northern Sumatra)
- A. c. hagar (Vollenhoven, 1865) (Sumatra)
