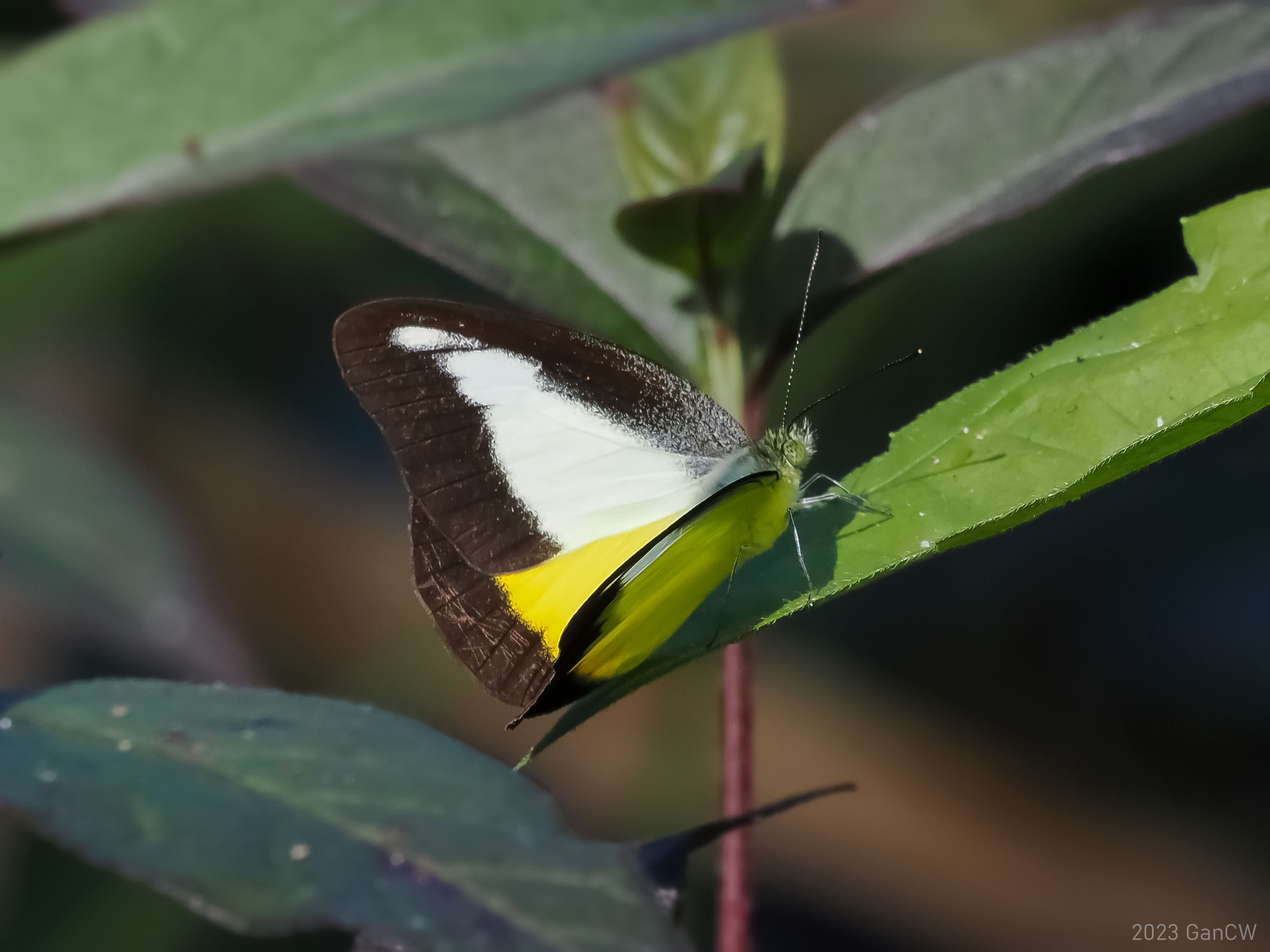

Scientific classification
- Kingdom: Animalia
- Phylum: Arthropoda
- Clade: Pancrustacea
- Class: Insecta
- Order: Lepidoptera
- Family: Pieridae
- Genus: Appias
- Species: A. nephele

Binomial name
- Appias nephele (Hewitson, 1861)

Synonyms
- Pieris nephele Hewitson, 1861; Tachyris nephele var. dilutior Staudinger, 1889

= Appias nephele =

Species of butterfly

Appias nephele is a species of pierine butterfly endemic to the Philippines.

== Subspecies ==
- Appias nephele nephele (Philippines: Luzon)
- Appias nephele aufidia Fruhstorfer, 1910 (Philippines: Basilan)
- Appias nephele dilutior (Staudinger, 1889) Philippines: Palawan)
- Appias nephele elis Fruhstorfer, 1910 (Philippines: Mindanao)
- Appias nephele hostilia Fruhstorfer, 1910 (Philippines: Sulu Islands)
- Appias nephele invitabilis Fruhstorfer, 1910 (Philippines: Mindoro)
- Appias nephele leytensis Fruhstorfer, 1911 (Philippines: Leyte)
