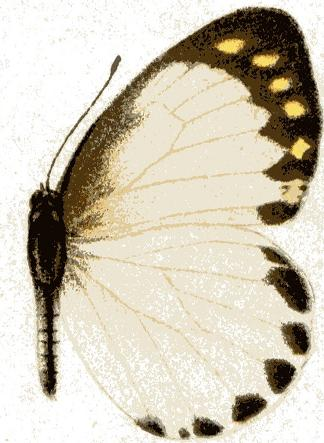
- Female
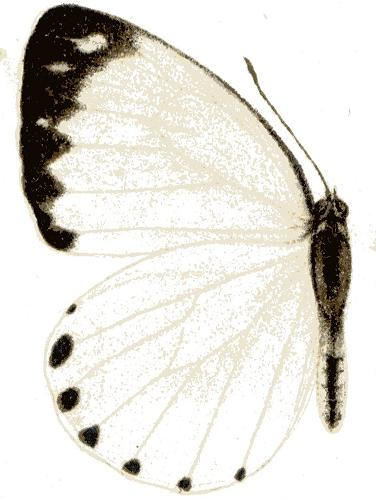
- Male

Scientific classification
- Kingdom: Animalia
- Phylum: Arthropoda
- Clade: Pancrustacea
- Class: Insecta
- Order: Lepidoptera
- Family: Pieridae
- Genus: Appias
- Species: A. phaola

Binomial name
- Appias phaola (Doubleday, 1847)

Synonyms
- Pieris phaola Doubleday, 1847; Appias (Glutophrissa) phaola; Pieris rhodanus Ward, 1871; Appias phaeola f. ochrea Bartel, 1905; Appias phaola r. intermedia Dufrane, 1948; Belenois isokani Grose-Smith, 1889; Mylothris nagare Grose-Smith, 1889

= Appias phaola =

Species of butterfly

Appias phaola, the Congo white, dirty albatross, dirty albatross white or plain albatross, is a butterfly in the family Pieridae. It is found in Sierra Leone, Liberia, Ivory Coast, Ghana, Togo, Benin, Nigeria, Cameroon, Equatorial Guinea (Bioko), the Republic of the Congo, Uganda, Ethiopia, Sudan, the Democratic Republic of the Congo, Kenya, Tanzania and Malawi. The habitat consists of primary wet forests.

Adults have a relatively fast flight. They tend to keep to the shade of the forest. Males engage in mud-puddling and both sexes are attracted to flowers.

== Subspecies ==
- Appias phaola phaola (Sierra Leone, Liberia, Ivory Coast, Ghana, Togo, Benin, southern Nigeria, Cameroon, Equatorial Guinea (Bioko), Congo)
- Appias phaola intermedia Dufrane, 1948 (Democratic Republic of the Congo, southern Sudan, Ethiopia, Uganda, western Tanzania)
- Appias phaola isokani (Grose-Smith, 1889) (coast of Kenya, north-eastern Tanzania, Malawi)
