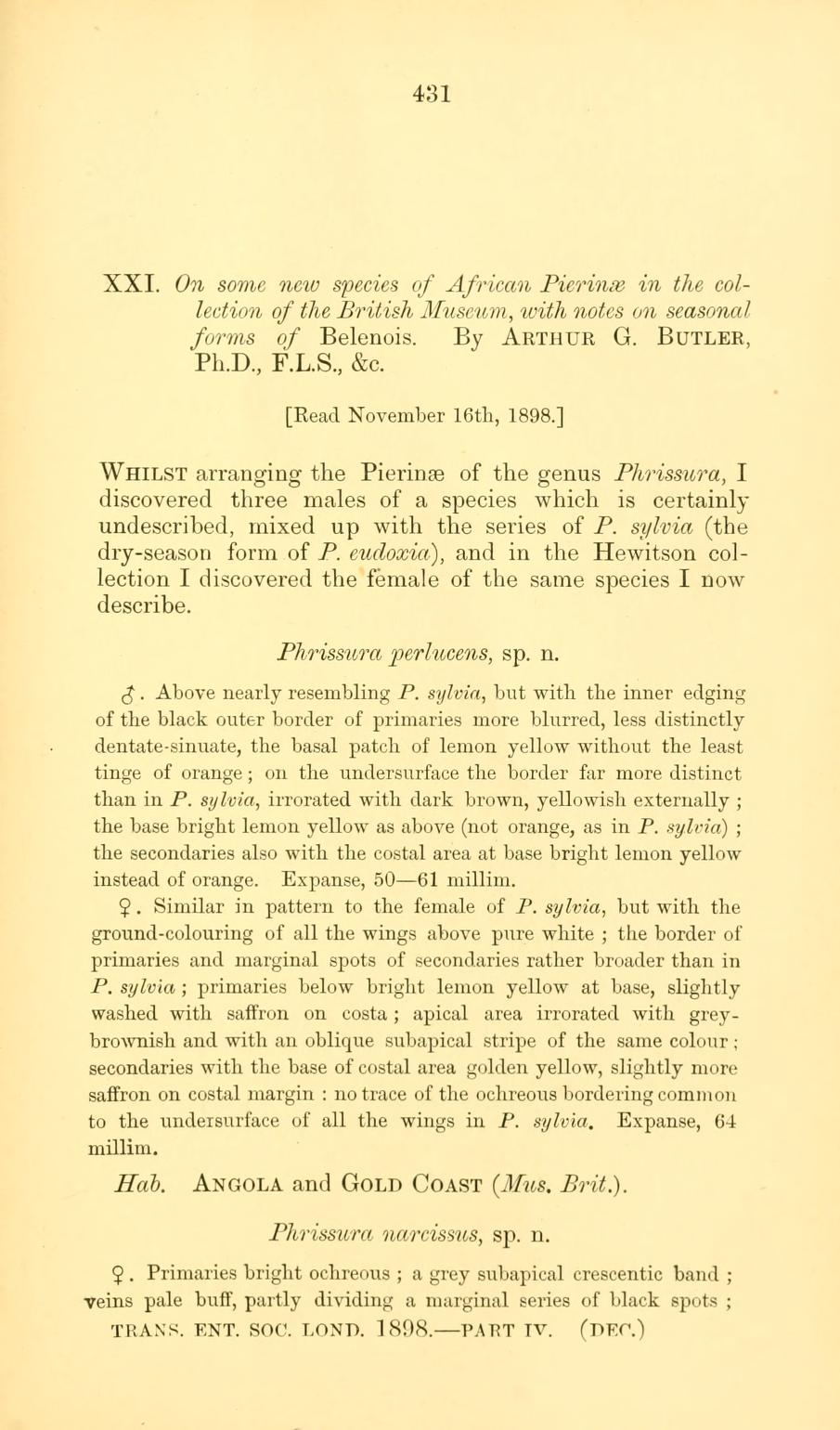
- Appias perlucens original description

Scientific classification
- Kingdom: Animalia
- Phylum: Arthropoda
- Clade: Pancrustacea
- Class: Insecta
- Order: Lepidoptera
- Family: Pieridae
- Genus: Appias
- Species: A. perlucens

Binomial name
- Appias perlucens (Butler, 1898)

Synonyms
- Pieris perlucens Butler, 1898; Phrissura perlucens; Appias (Glutophrissa) perlucens; Appias canisia Hulstaert, 1924; Appias sylvia sylvia f. auriflua Talbot, 1943; Appias sylvia sylvia f. ochraciens Talbot, 1943

= Appias perlucens =

Species of butterfly

Appias perlucens is a butterfly in the family Pieridae. It is found from Cameroon to Angola and the Democratic Republic of the Congo. The habitat consists of forests. It closely resembles Appias sylvia.
