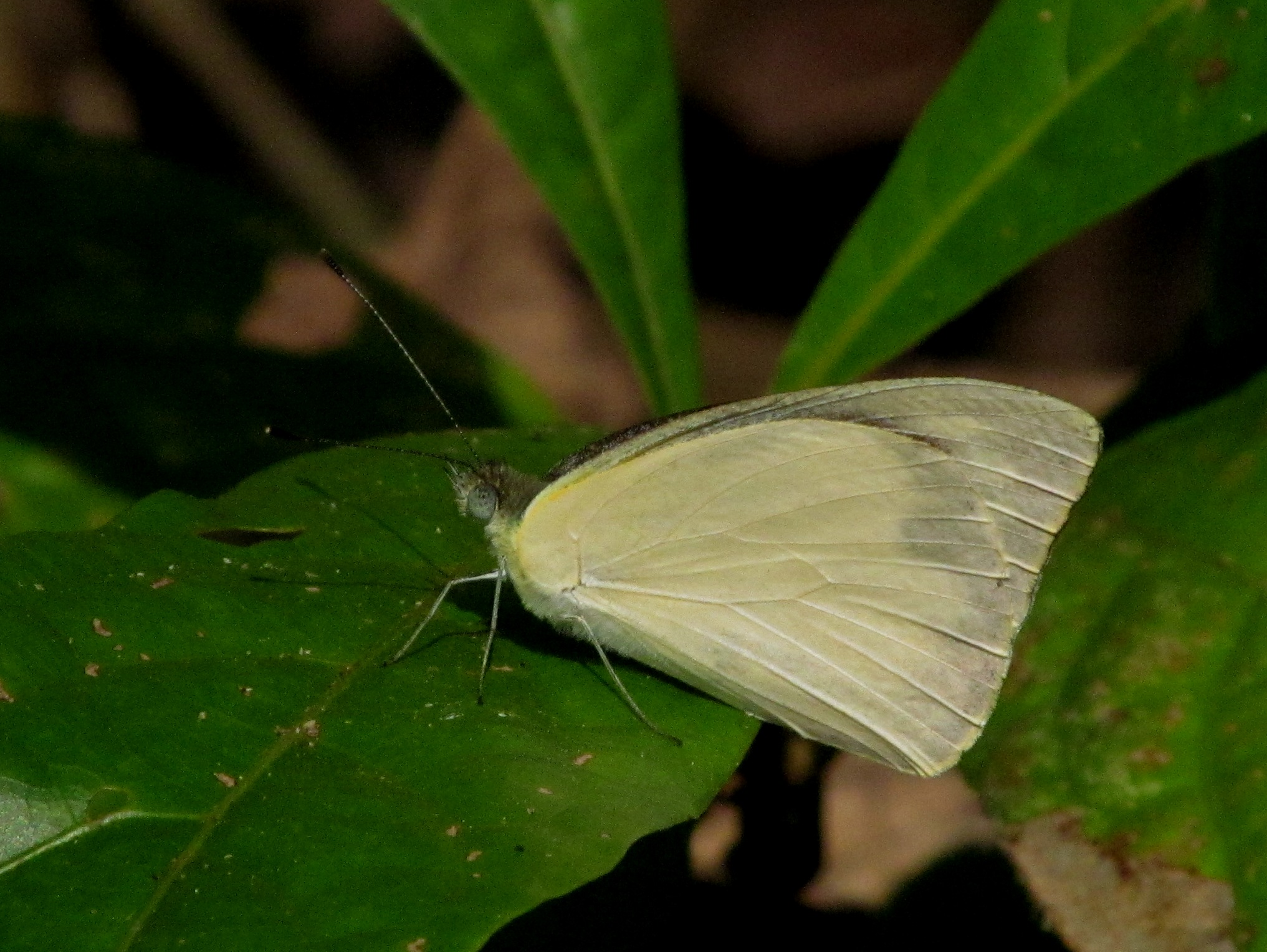

Scientific classification
- Kingdom: Animalia
- Phylum: Arthropoda
- Clade: Pancrustacea
- Class: Insecta
- Order: Lepidoptera
- Family: Pieridae
- Genus: Appias
- Species: A. wardii

Binomial name
- Appias wardii (Moore, 1884)

= Appias wardii =

Lesser albatross

Species of butterfly

Appias wardii, the Indian albatross or Ward's albatross, is a small butterfly of the family Pieridae, that is, the yellows and whites, which is found in India.

== Description ==
=== Wet-season brood ===
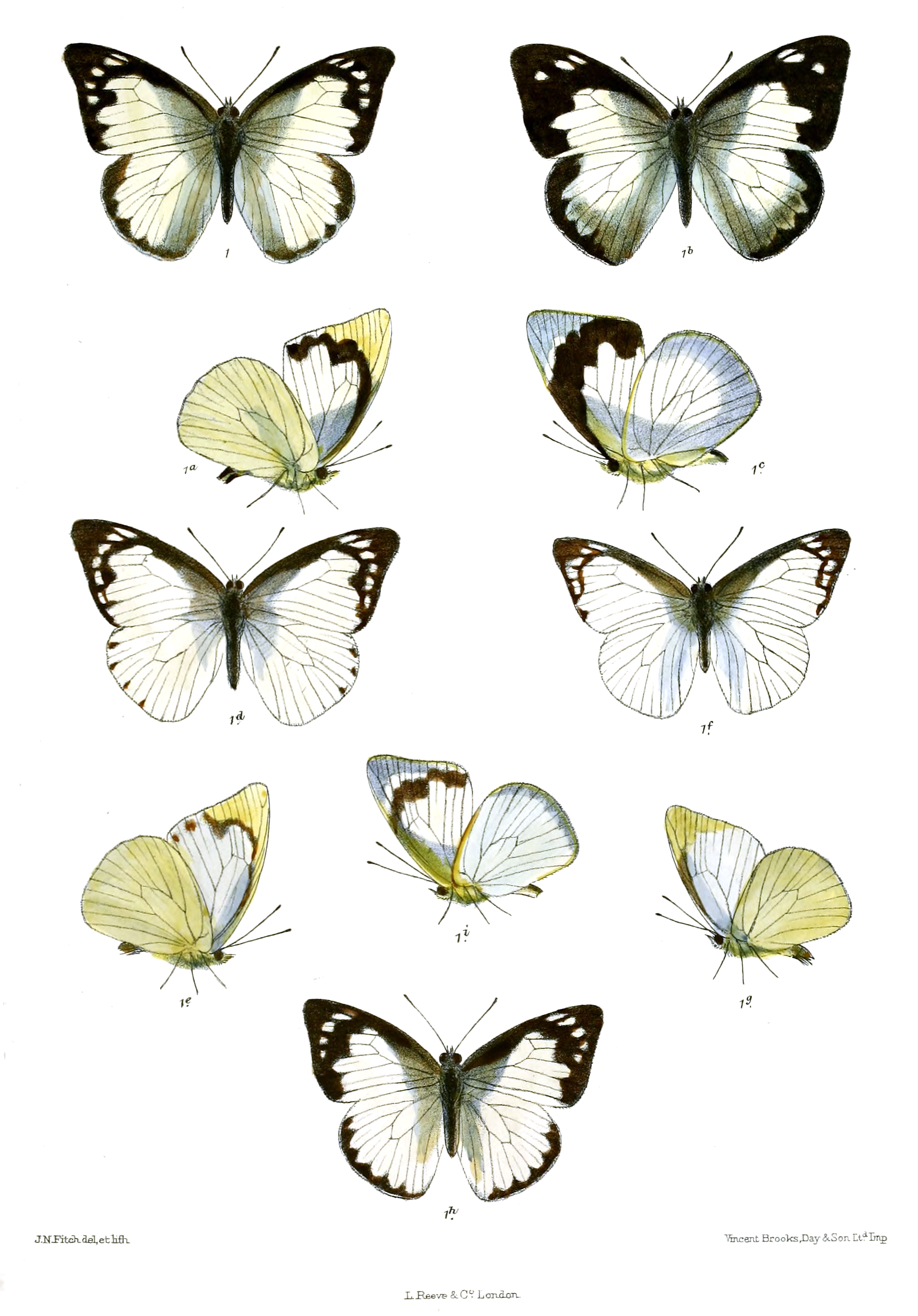

The upperside of the male has the ground colour white. Forewing has the base densely and broadly irrorated with black scales which gradually merge along the costa into the black apical area that occupies about one-third of the wing, the inner margin of this area irregular, passing in a curve from costa to vein 4, thence vertically to vein 3 outwards in interspace 2 and irregularly to the dorsum; a curved preapical series of four or five white spots superposed on the black area. Hindwing: slightly irrorated (sprinkled) with black scales at base which leave a terminal series of large, somewhat diamond-shaped, black spots at the apices of veins 3 to 7. Underside, forewing: white, apex butter yellow, a somewhat narrow zigzag curved irregular black band from middle of costa to tornus. Hindwing: uniform butter yellow.

Female has the upperside similar to that of the male, but differs in the much greater extent of the black area which occupies the outer apical half of the forewing and on the hindwing forms a broad continuous terminal band; the superposed spots on black area of forewing reduced to two and the irroration of black scales at the bases of the wings more dense; on the hindwing this latter extends subdorsally to the black terminal margin. Underside, forewing: white, basal half of cell suffused with sulphur yellow; a very broad curved black band crosses the wing from costa to tornus, the inner margin of this irregular, the outer margin fairly even; apex pearly bluish white. The hindwing is uniform, pearly bluish white.

=== Dry-season brood ===
The male has the upperside similar to the wet-season form but on the forewing the irroration of black scales at base and the black on apical area much restricted, the latter in most specimens has a more or less rubbed appearance; the white preapical spots very ill-defined. Hindwing: entirely white, in some specimens with a faint yellowish tinge. Underside, forewing: white, with a bluish tint broadly along the basal two-thirds of the costal margin; apex butter yellow; in a few specimens the usual black curved band that crosses the wing is indicated by a few detached black scales but in most it is entirely absent. The hindwing is uniform butter yellow.

Female has the upperside similar to that of the wet-season form but the black area on both forewings and hindwings much restricted just as it is in the male. The underside is also similar to that of the wet-season form but on the forewing the curved black band is very much narrower, and the nacreous surface of the hindwing has more or less of a yellowish tinge. In both sexes and in both seasonal forms the antennae are black minutely speckled with white, the tufted hair on the head and thorax anteriorly greyish green, abdomen white; beneath: head and thorax pale yellowish white, abdomen white.

The wingspan is 65–76 mm.

This species is found in the Western Ghats and the hills of southern India.

== See also ==
- Pieridae
- List of butterflies of India
- List of butterflies of India (Pieridae)
