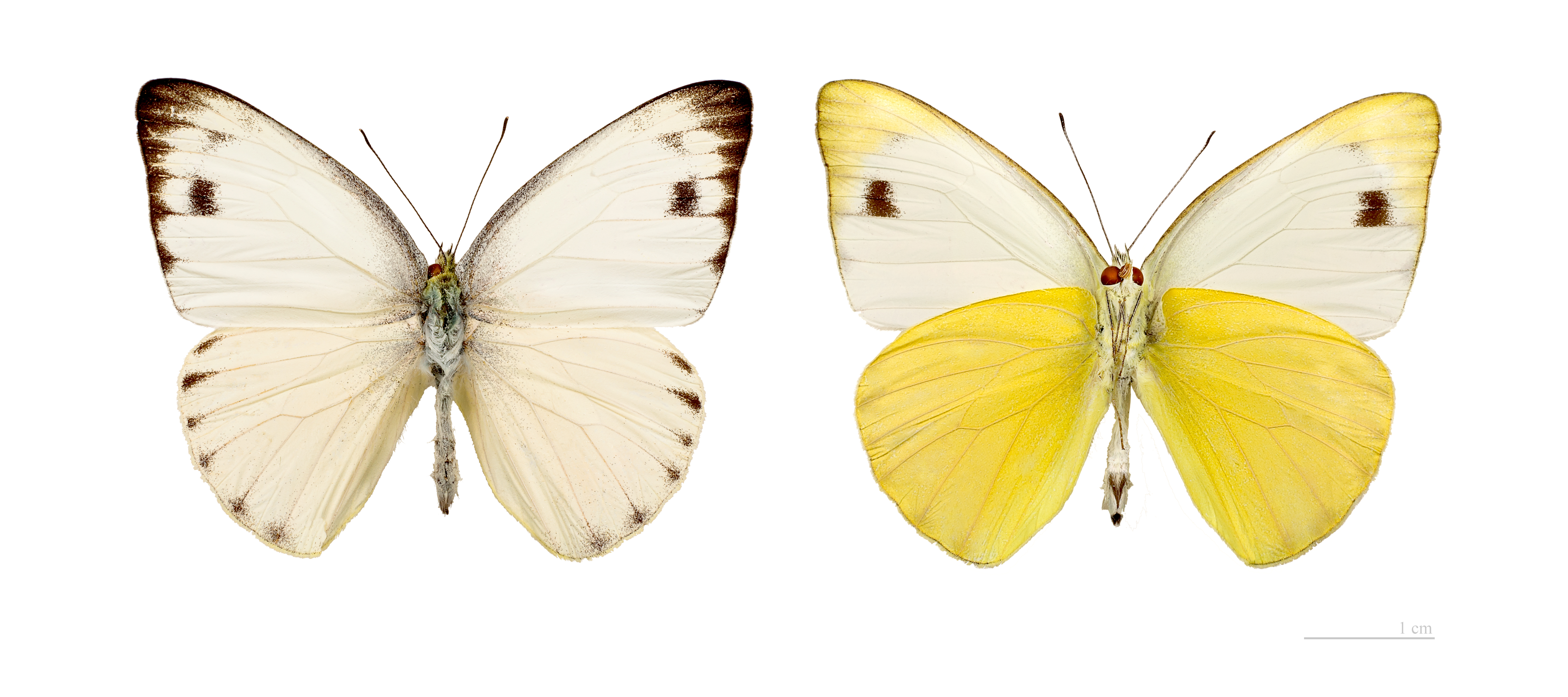
- A. p. rowelli

Scientific classification
- Kingdom: Animalia
- Phylum: Arthropoda
- Clade: Pancrustacea
- Class: Insecta
- Order: Lepidoptera
- Family: Pieridae
- Genus: Appias
- Species: A. phoebe

Binomial name
- Appias phoebe (C. & R. Felder, 1861)

Synonyms
- Pieris phoebe C. & R. Felder, 1861; Appias (Appias) phoebe

= Appias phoebe =

Species of butterfly

Appias phoebe is a butterfly in the family Pieridae. It is found on the Philippines (including Palawan and Luzon). A new subspecies was discovered in 2020.

== Subspecies ==
- Appias phoebe mindana Yamamoto & Takei, 1980 (Mindanao)
- Appias phoebe nuydai Badon & Miller, 2020
- Appias phoebe phoebe
- Appias phoebe rowelli (R. Rodriguez, H. Schröder & Treadaway, 1982) (Palawan)
