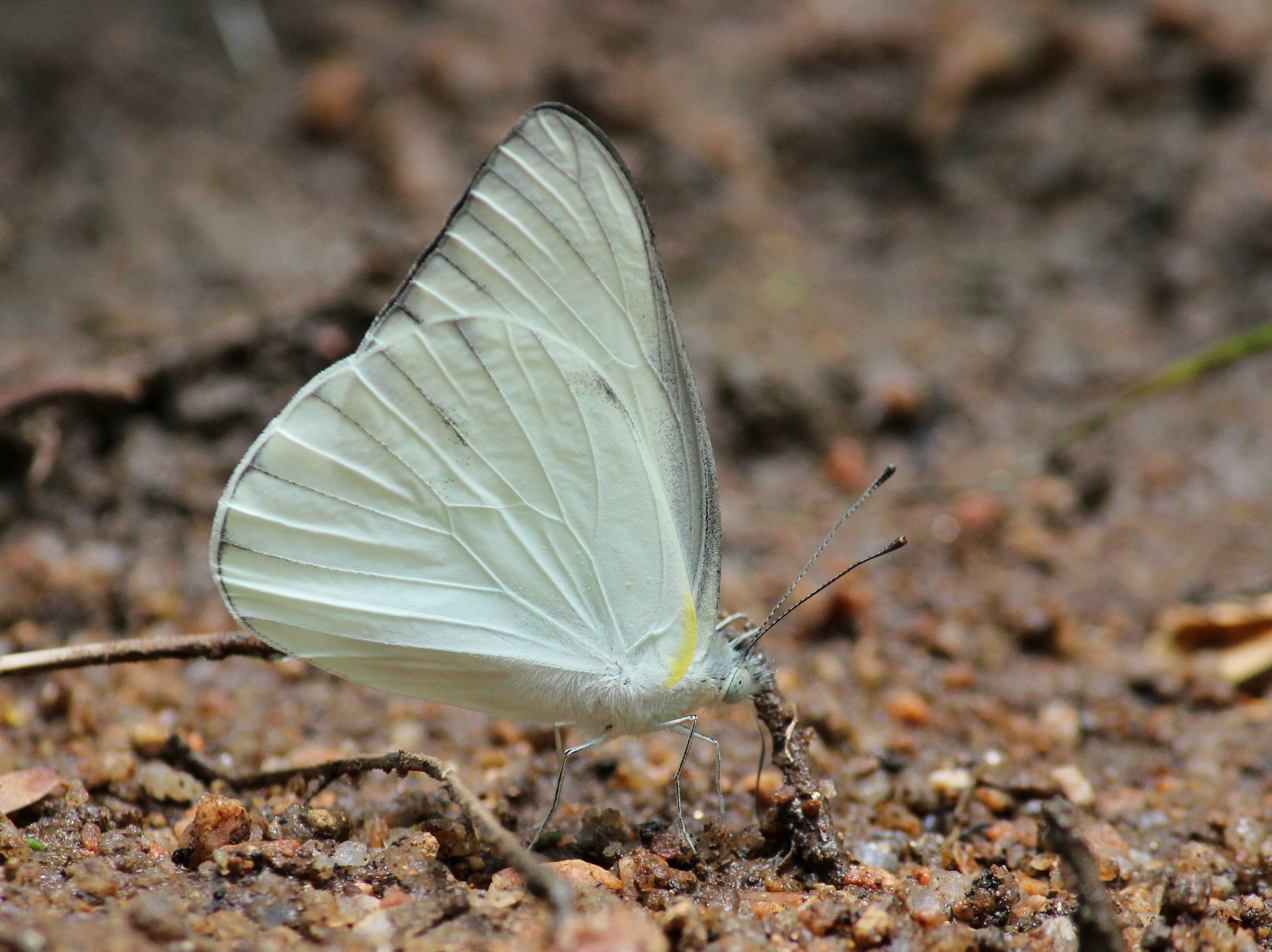
- Male
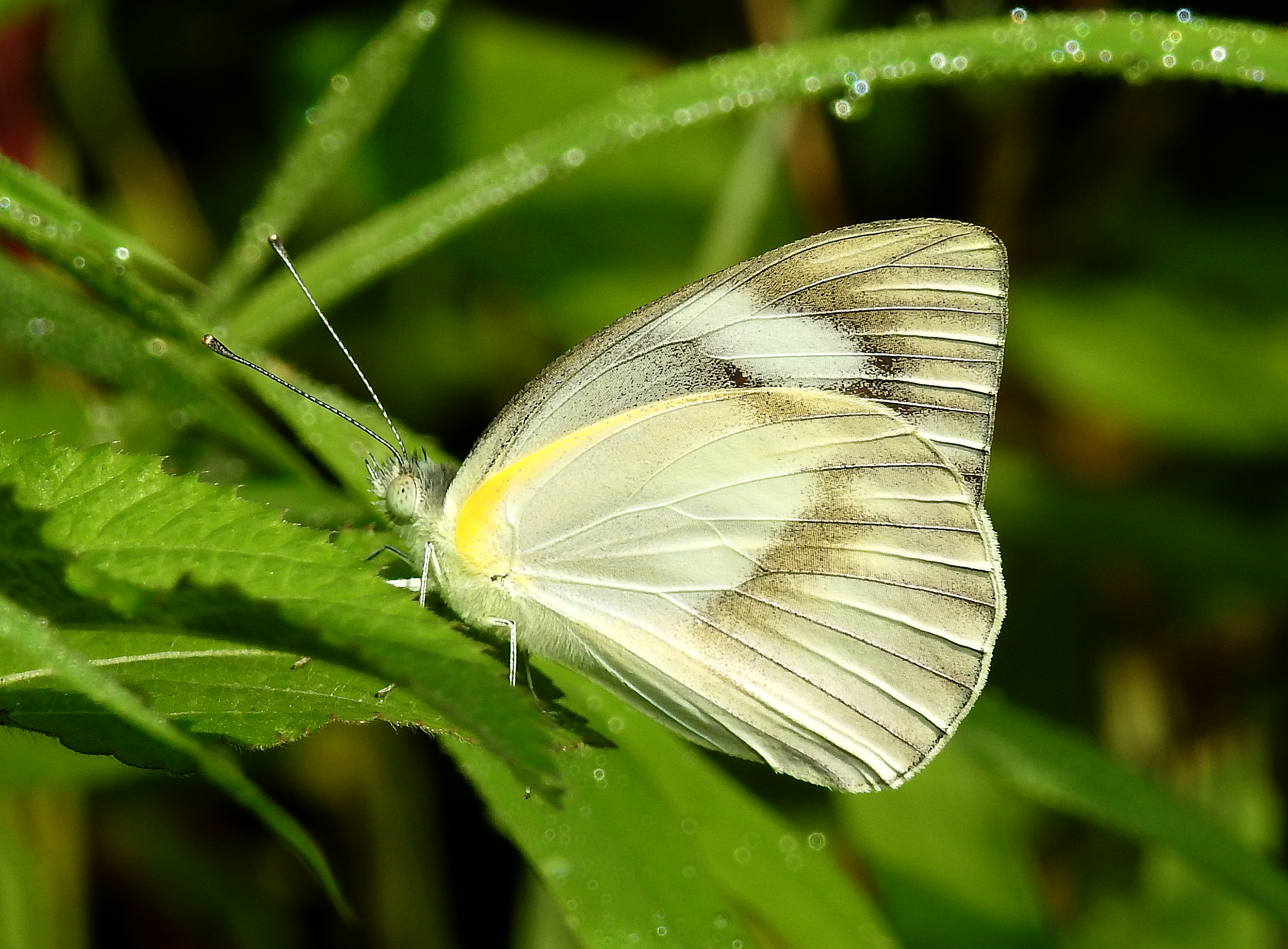
- Female

Scientific classification
- Kingdom: Animalia
- Phylum: Arthropoda
- Clade: Pancrustacea
- Class: Insecta
- Order: Lepidoptera
- Family: Pieridae
- Genus: Appias
- Species: A. libythea

Binomial name
- Appias libythea Fabricius, 1775

= Appias libythea =

Striped albatross

Small butterfly of the family Pieridae

Appias libythea, the striped albatross, is a small butterfly of the family Pieridae, that is, the yellows and whites, which is found in south and southeast Asia.

== Description ==
Wet-season brood: Male. Upperside greyish-white. Forewing with black costal edge, and grey-black scaled irrorated basal costal border; a black-scaled very narrow exterior marginal dentated baud decreasing from the subcostal to the submedian. Hindwing with very small indistinct blackish-scaled marginal vein-points, which are obsolete in some specimens that probably emerged near the dry season. Underside white. Forewing with the costal and outer edge slightly blackish; a few greyish-black scales along the base of costa. Hindwing unmarked. Female. Upperside greyish-white. Forewing with greyish-black costal edge, a broad longitudinal band from base of the costa and filling up the cell — with the exception of a thin streak above the median vein, this black cell-band more or less thinly extends along the upper median veinlet and joins a broad outer-marginal decreasing band extending sinuously from before the apex to posterior angle, enclosing the white sub-apical oblique quadrate patch, the outer band showing faint traces of paler intervening streaks; a less intense greyish-black fascia extends pointedly outward from below the cell to the disc in extreme wet-season specimens. Hindwing with a greyish-black marginal macular band composed of large confluent spots, or, of more or less slightly separated spots paling diffusely to the anal angle, and connected by similar coloured scales along the veins from the lower subcostal to a discal curved paler fascia, which latter becomes obsolete posteriorly. Underside white. Both wings with dark-grey similar disposed markings. Forewing with the outer band traversed by white interspaced streaks, or this band is white and its inner edge only defined by dark grey. Hindwing with the outer marginal macular band indistinct or obsolescent; base of costa pale yellow. Some intermediate specimens of this sex - which agree with the Fabrician type specimens of Lihythea — emerged probably near the dry season, vary on the upperside, in the forewing, in the connecting black streak along the upper-median to the outer band, and also the lower basal fascia, being either obsolescent or obsolete, and in the hindwing, the marginal spots are smaller and more or less well separated, the discal fascia with its connecting veins is also obsolescent or more generally entirely absent. On the underside, the markings are much less defined; on the forewing the outer band is very faintly indicated by the greyish inner edge, the apical area being entirely white or very faintly tinged with pale yellow, and on the hindwing the ground-colour is either white or very faintly tinged with pale yellow, the discal fascia being faintly indicated, and the marginal spots absent. Dry-season brood: Male. Upperside. Forewing with a diffused broader grey-black scaled outer-marginal band. Hindwing unmarked. Underside with the apicnl area of forewing, and entire hindwing tinted with very pale yellow. Female. Upperside. Forewing with the cell-band and the marginal band somewhat narrower than in specimens of the intermediate form, the connecting streak being entirely absent. Hindwing unmarked. Underside. Forewing with the cell-band and marginal band faintly indicated, the apical area pale yellow tinted. Hindwing pale yellow tinted; the discal fascia faintly indicated.

— Frederic Moore, Lepidoptera Indica. Vol. VI

== See also ==
- List of butterflies of India
- List of butterflies of India (Pieridae)

== Gallery ==
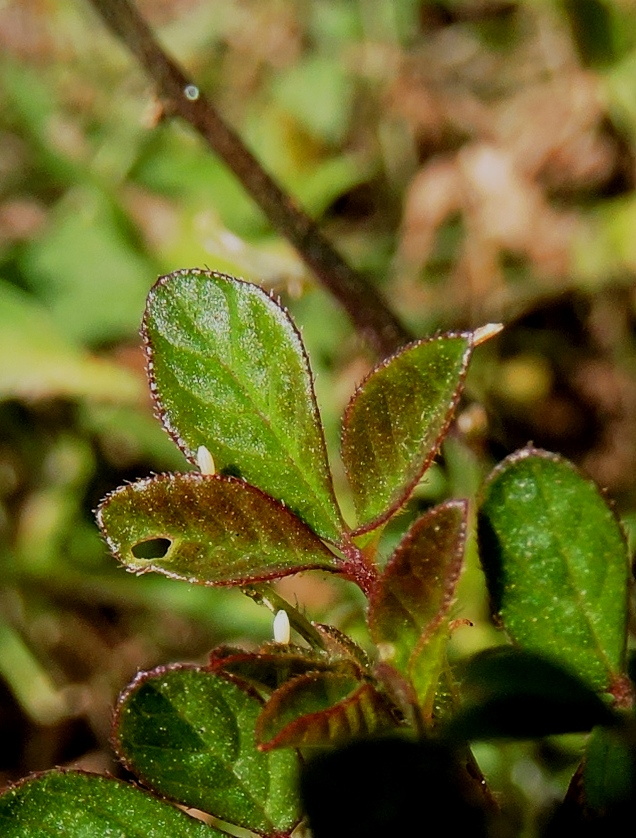
Egg

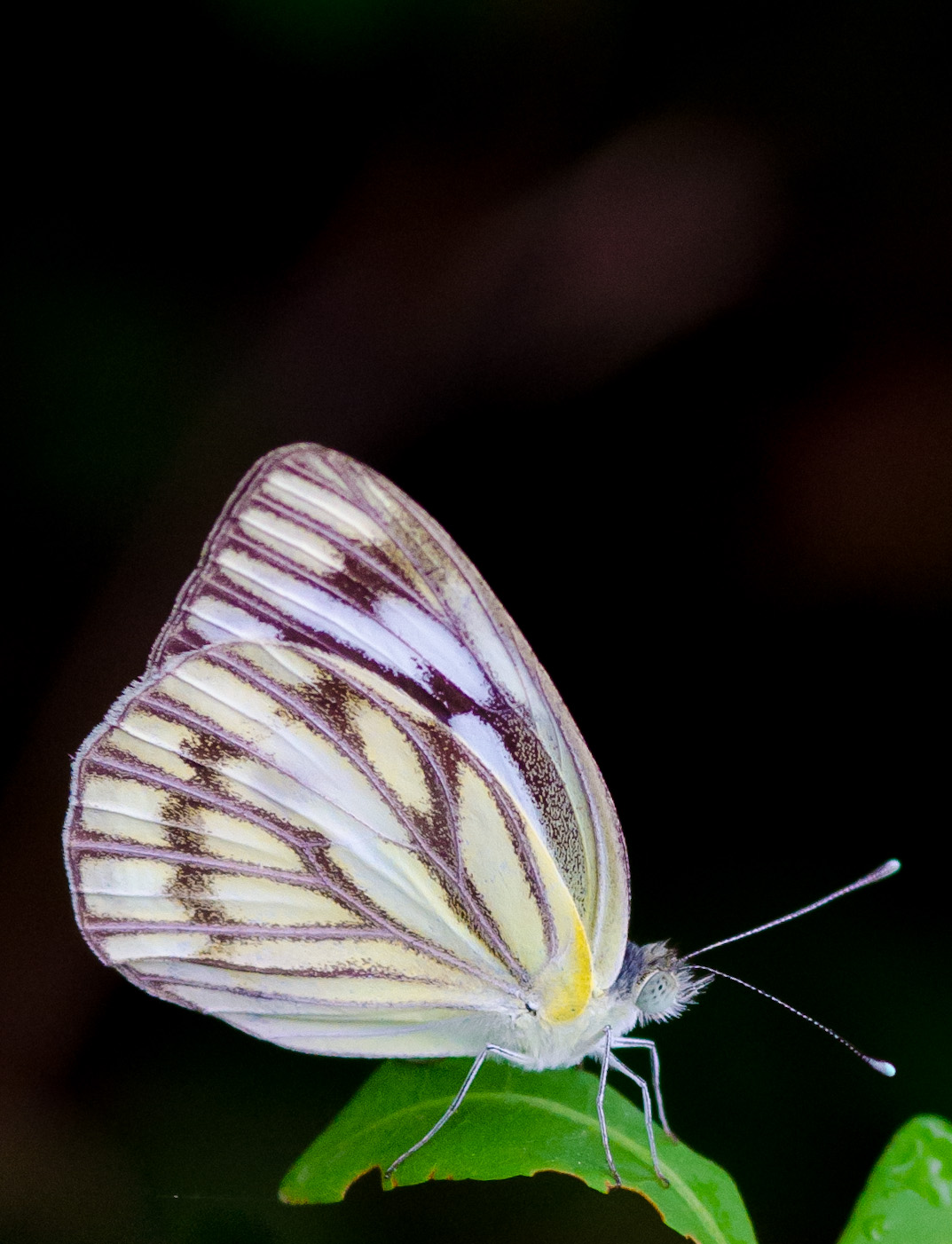
Striped albatross in Bangalore, India

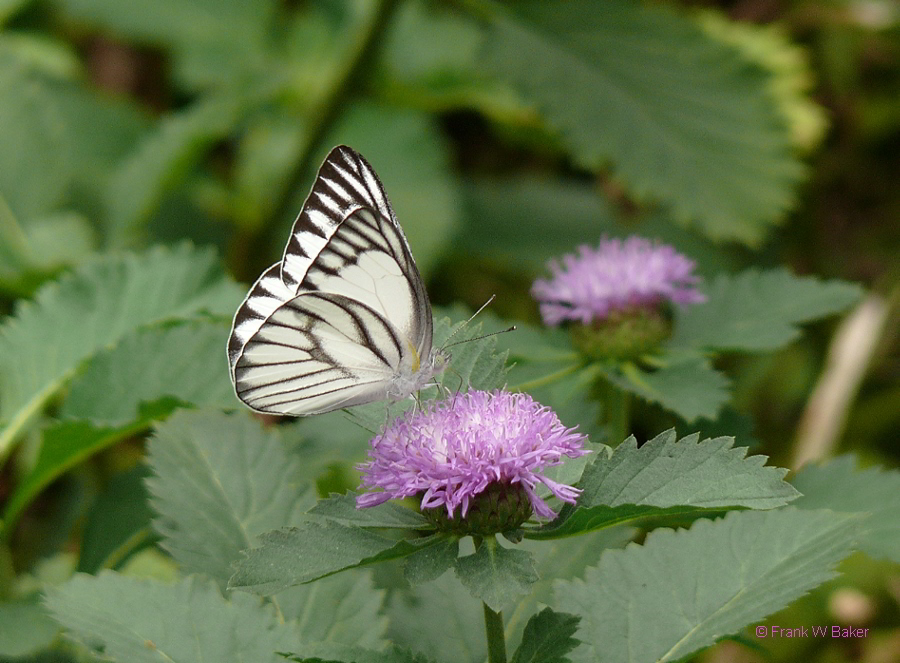
Male in Kuala Lumpur, Malaysia

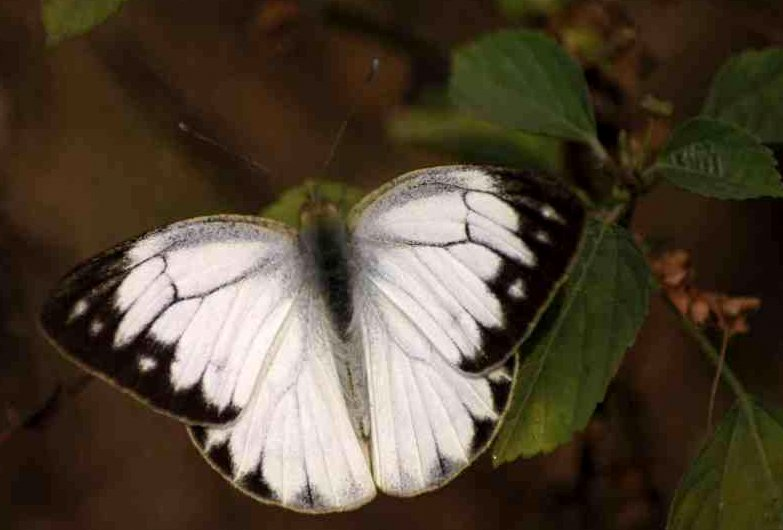
Striped albatross (ধুলকাপাস), Kolkata, India

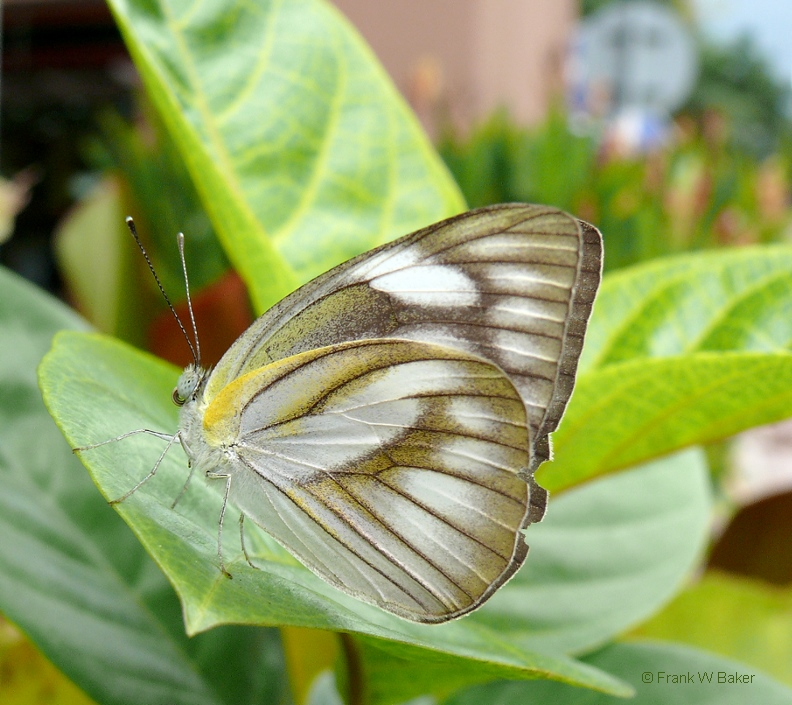
Female in Kuala Lumpur, Malaysia
