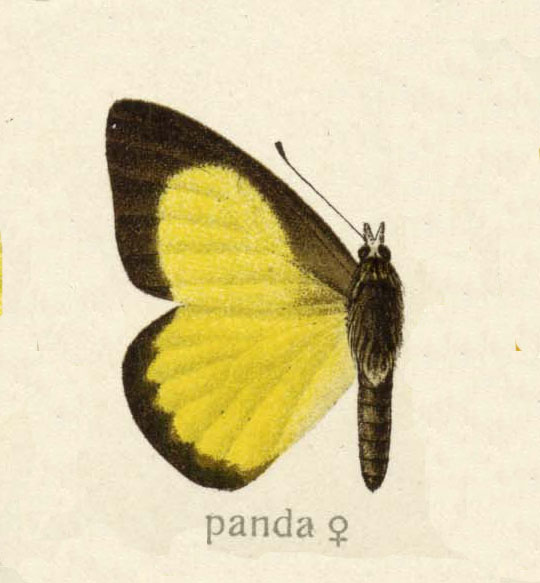

Scientific classification
- Kingdom: Animalia
- Phylum: Arthropoda
- Class: Insecta
- Order: Lepidoptera
- Family: Pieridae
- Genus: Appias
- Species: A. panda

Binomial name
- Appias panda Fruhstorfer, 1903

= Appias panda =

Nicobar albatross

Species of butterfly

Appias panda, the Nicobar albatross, is a small butterfly of the family Pieridae, that is, the yellows and whites, which is found in the Nicobar Islands of India.

== See also ==
- Pieridae
- List of butterflies of India
- List of butterflies of India (Pieridae)
