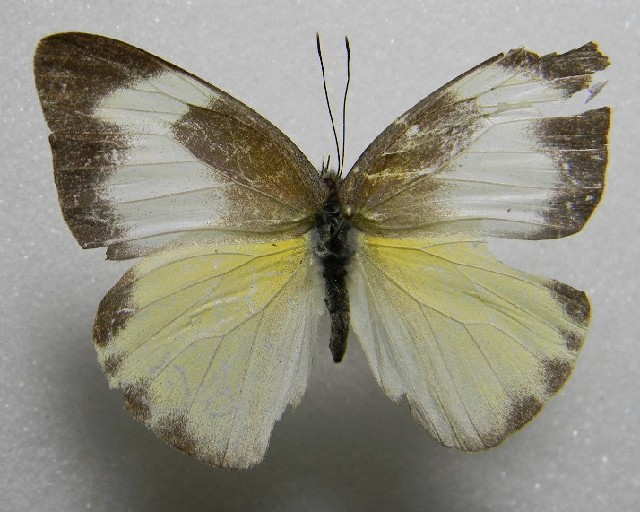
- Female
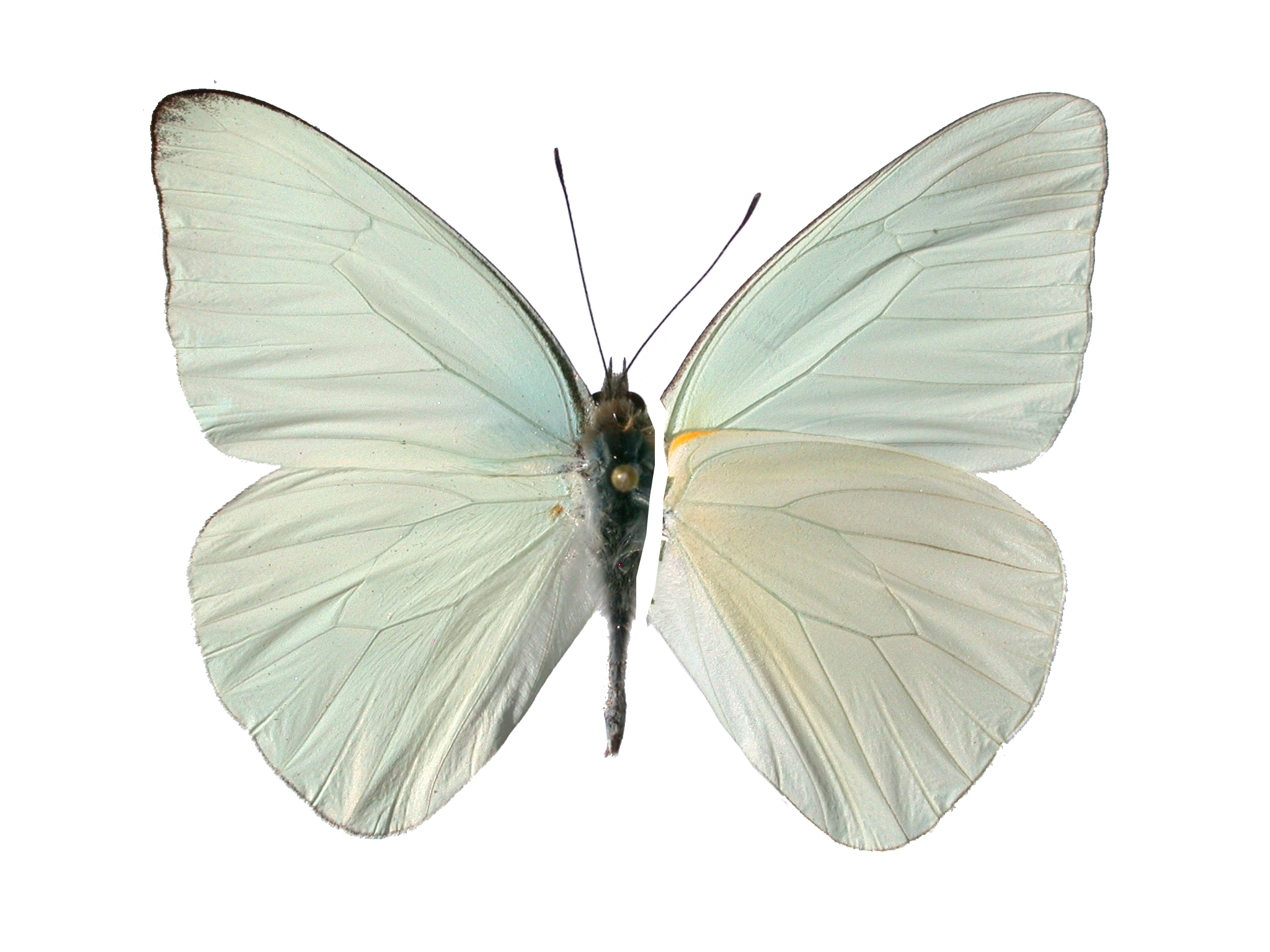
- Male

Conservation status
- Secure (NatureServe)

Scientific classification
- Kingdom: Animalia
- Phylum: Arthropoda
- Clade: Pancrustacea
- Class: Insecta
- Order: Lepidoptera
- Family: Pieridae
- Genus: Appias
- Species: A. drusilla

Binomial name
- Appias drusilla (Cramer, [1777])

Synonyms
- Papilio drusilla Cramer, [1777]; Glutophrissa drusilla; Pieris ilaire Godart, 1819; Pieris mysia Godart, 1819; Mylothris margarita Hübner, [1819] (nom. nud.); Papilio albunea Dalman, 1823; Mylothris molpadia Hübner, [1823]; Mylothris margarita Hübner, [1825]; Appias margarita; Tachyris janeira Bönninghausen, 1896; Appias drusilla f. nana d'Almeida, 1913; Appias drusilla var. augustiniana Fernández, 1928; Daptonoura laria alba Ribeiro, 1931; Appias drusilla f. minima Breyer, 1939; Papilio castalia Fabricius, 1793; Glutophrissa drusilla jacksoni Kaye, 1920; Appias poeyi Butler, 1872; Appias janeira f. peregrina Röber, 1909; Appias poeyi f. minor Dufrane, 1947; Appias drusilla ab. hollandi Röber, 1908

= Appias drusilla =

Species of butterfly

Appias drusilla, the Florida white or tropical white, is a butterfly in the family Pieridae. It is found in tropical America from Brazil north to southern peninsular Florida and the Florida Keys and Antilles. It frequently visits coastal Texas and is a rare stray to Nebraska and Colorado. The habitat consists of tropical lowland evergreen or semideciduous forests.

== Description ==
The wingspan is 53–77 mm (2.1–3.0 in). Males are solid white on both the upper and lower surfaces of the wings except for a narrow edging of black along the forewing costal margin. The female has two forms: the dry-season form is all white and the wet-season form has black along the forewing costal margin and a yellow-orange upper hindwing. The dry-season form is on wing from October to April and the wet-season form from May to September. They feed on flower nectar from a variety of weeds and garden plants including Lantana and Eupatorium.

The larvae feed on glucosinolate-containing plant species from the Capparaceae, Cleomaceae, and Putranjivaceae families (excluding Brassicaceae), including Drypetes lateriflora and Capparis flexuosa in Florida. They are shade loving and feed during the night and on cloudy days.

== Subspecies ==
The following subspecies are recognised:

- Appias drusilla drusilla (Peru, Argentina, Brazil: Rio de Janeiro, Rondônia)
- Appias drusilla castalia (Fabricius, 1793) (Jamaica)
- Appias drusilla poeyi (Butler, 1872) (Cuba)
- Appias drusilla neumoegenii (Skinner, 1894) (Florida)
- Appias drusilla monomorpha Hall, 1936 (Grenada)
- Appias drusilla boydi Comstock, 1943 (Dominican Republic)
- Appias drusilla comstocki Dillon, 1947 (Dominica)
- Appias drusilla tenuis Lamas, 1981 (Peru)
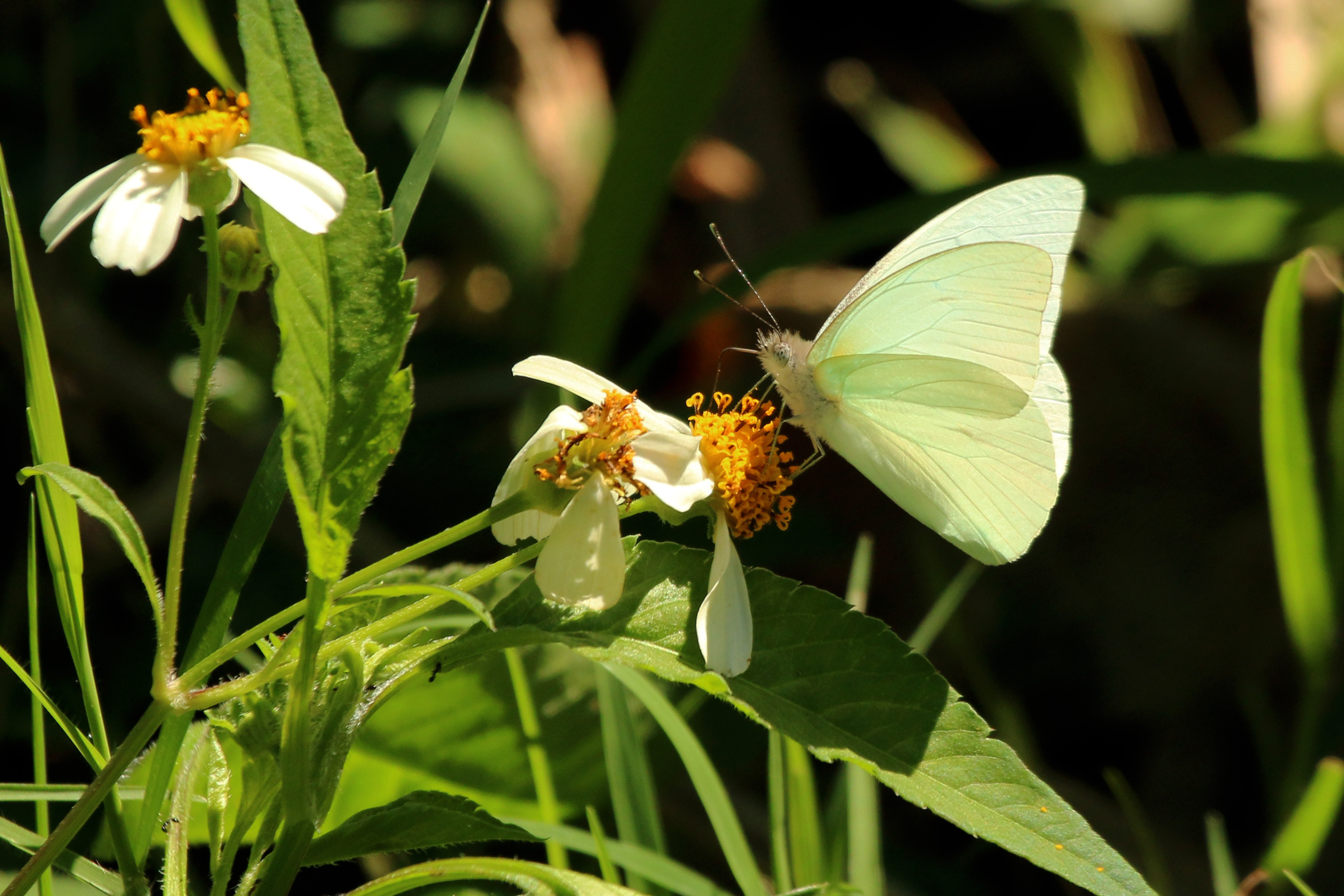
A. d. castalia, Jamaica
