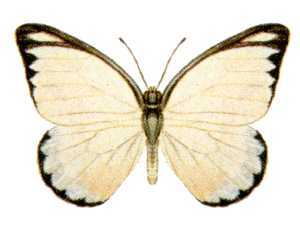

Scientific classification
- Kingdom: Animalia
- Phylum: Arthropoda
- Clade: Pancrustacea
- Class: Insecta
- Order: Lepidoptera
- Family: Pieridae
- Genus: Appias
- Species: A. ada

Binomial name
- Appias ada (Stoll, [1781])

Synonyms
- Papilio ada Stoll, [1781]; Appias caria Waterhouse & Lyell, 1914

= Appias ada =

Rare albatross

Species of butterfly

Appias ada, the rare albatross, is a butterfly of the family Pieridae. It is found on the Moluccas, New Guinea, Indonesia, Australia and the Solomon Islands.

== Subspecies ==
- Appias ada ada
- Appias ada thasia (Papua)
- Appias ada caria (north-eastern Australia)
- Appias ada solstitialis

== Description ==
The wingspan of males is 59 mm, while in females it is 54 mm. Upper segment of the forewings are white with a black costa, as well as black dots along the margin. Males have a white dot near the apex. The hind wings also have black margins, however are coloured a pale yellow. The underside of both male and female forewings are white with a black costa, while hindwing undersides are yellow. In the female, the black sections of the underside are larger, and the apex of the forewing is more rounded. A. ada males are visually similar to those of D. ennia, especially the subspecies D. e. tindalti, both of which occur in the Cape York region of Australia. The distinguishing feature is the lack of orange spots on the hind wing's underside.

== Life cycle ==
Eggs: Laid singularly, placed on the young shoots of their food source. Shaped like a spindle (height of 1 mm, width of 0.5mm), and initially white, they change to orange before hatching. Larva: 35 mm long; blue-green body, with "numerous blue conical tubercles, a yellow middorsal line, and a white ventrolateral line". The head is pale yellow, with blue stripes. Feed on the young shoots of Crateva religiosa, also known as Temple Plant. It does not survive if fed older leaves. Pupa: 27mm long. Yellow with black dorsal spots. Black spine with a white cremaster. Life cycle is completed within three weeks of summer: egg 4 days, larva 10 days, pupa 6 days

== Ecology ==
Occurrence records show the habitat of A. ada to range from open woody trees to sparse grasses. Of the various species, only A. a. caria is apparent in Australia, to which it is endemic. The larva rests on the midrib of a leaf, spinning a slik pad on which it sits. Adults often fly rapidly along watercourses, and have been recorded all months excluding March. The mitochondrial genome for A. ada has been sequenced.

== See also ==
- Australian Butterflies
- Insects
