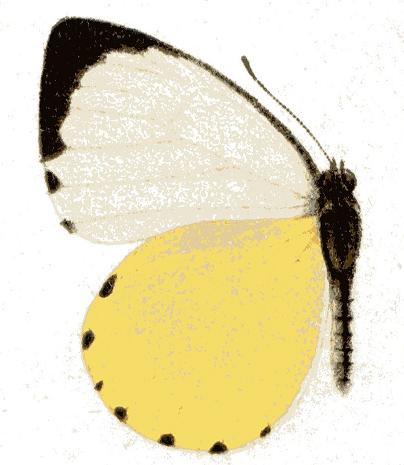

Scientific classification
- Kingdom: Animalia
- Phylum: Arthropoda
- Clade: Pancrustacea
- Class: Insecta
- Order: Lepidoptera
- Family: Pieridae
- Genus: Appias
- Species: A. lasti

Binomial name
- Appias lasti (Grose-Smith, 1889)

Synonyms
- Mylothris lasti Grose-Smith, 1889; Appias (Glutophrissa) lasti; Appias lasti var. natalensis Neustetter, 1927

= Appias lasti =

Last's albatross

Butterfly in the family Pieridae

Appias lasti, the Last's albatross or Last's albatross white, is a butterfly in the family Pieridae. It is found in Kenya, Tanzania and Mozambique. The habitat consists of coastal forests and heavy woodland.

The larvae feed on Drypetes gerrardii, Phyllanthus, Capparis, Maerua, and Ritchiea species.

== Subspecies ==
- Appias lasti lasti (coast of Kenya, coast of Tanzania and coast of Mozambique)
- Appias lasti natalensis Neustetter, 1927 (South Africa: Natal, but this is thought to be a false locality)
