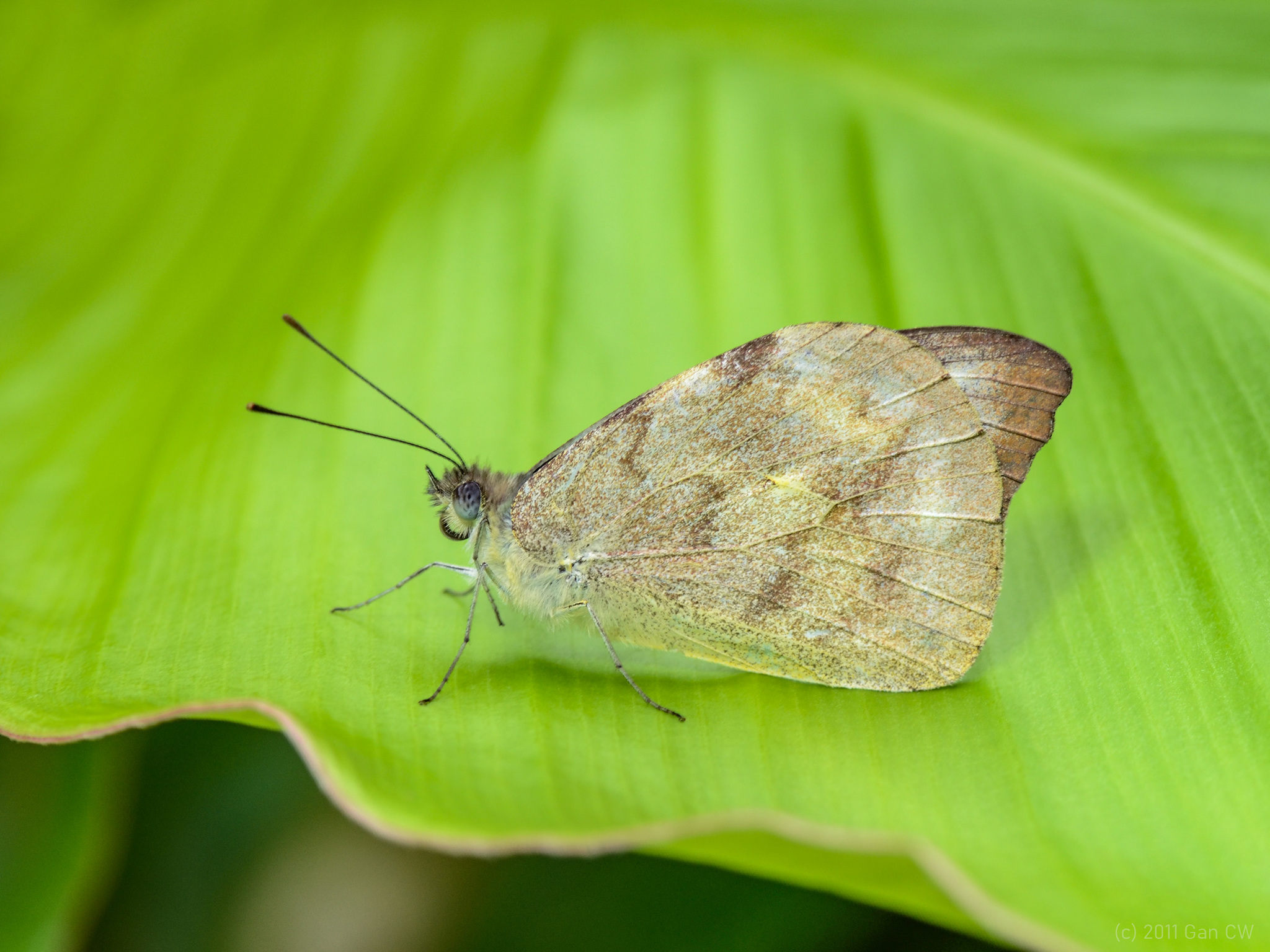

Scientific classification
- Kingdom: Animalia
- Phylum: Arthropoda
- Clade: Pancrustacea
- Class: Insecta
- Order: Lepidoptera
- Family: Pieridae
- Genus: Appias
- Species: A. lalassis

Binomial name
- Appias lalassis (Grose-Smith, 1887)

Synonyms
- Pieris indroides Honrath, [1890]

= Appias lalassis =

Species of butterfly

Appias lalassis, the Burmese Puffin, is a butterfly in the family Pieridae.It was described by Henley Grose-Smith in 1887. It is found in the Indomalayan realm.

== Subspecies ==
- Appias lalassis lalassis (southern Burma, Thailand, southern Yunnan)
- Appias lalassis indroides (Honrath, [1890]) (Peninsular Malaysia)
