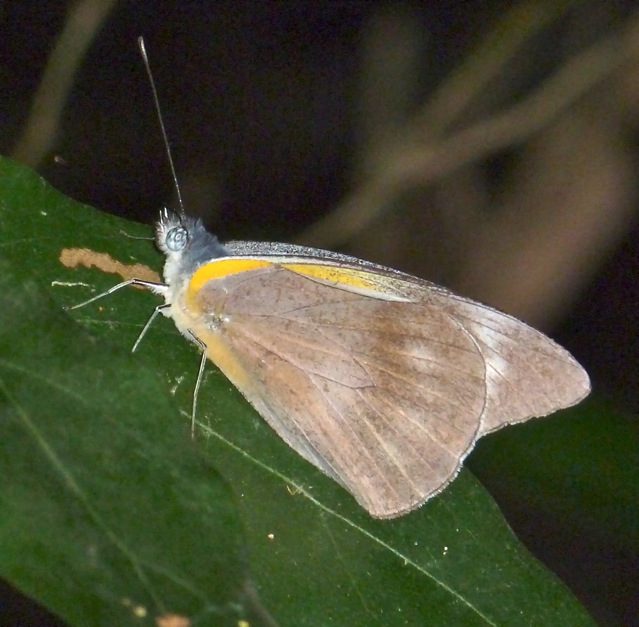

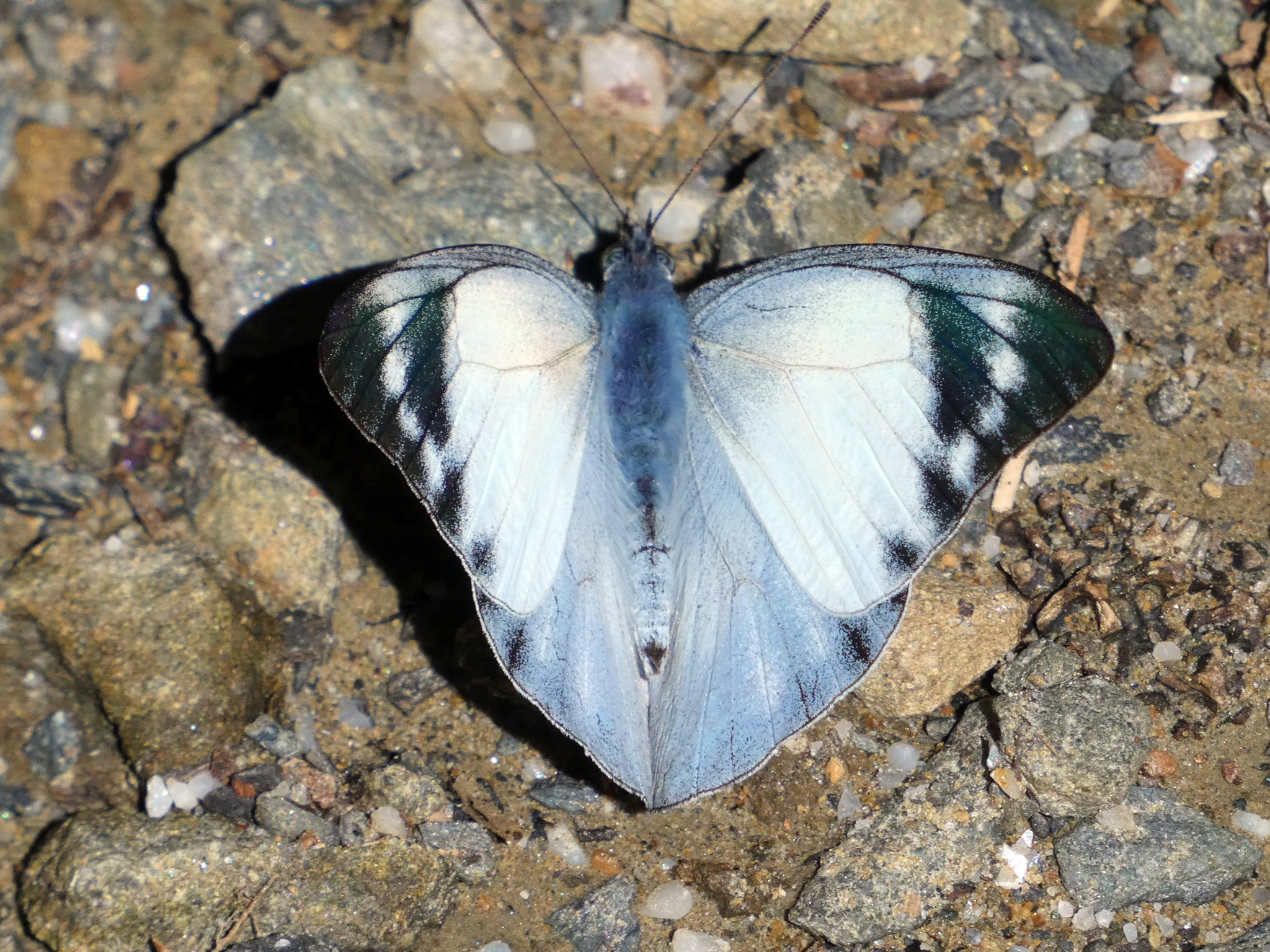

Scientific classification
- Kingdom: Animalia
- Phylum: Arthropoda
- Clade: Pancrustacea
- Class: Insecta
- Order: Lepidoptera
- Family: Pieridae
- Genus: Appias
- Species: A. melania

Binomial name
- Appias melania (Fabricius, 1775)

Synonyms
- Papilio melania Fabricius, 1775; Tachyris asteria Miskin, 1889; Tachyris cerussa Fruhstorfer, 1904; Appias melania antoniae Fruhstorfer, 1910

= Appias melania =

Grey albatross

Species of butterfly

Appias melania, the grey albatross, is a butterfly of the family Pieridae. It is endemic to northern Queensland in Australia.

The wingspan is about 50 mm.

The larvae feed on Drypetes species.
