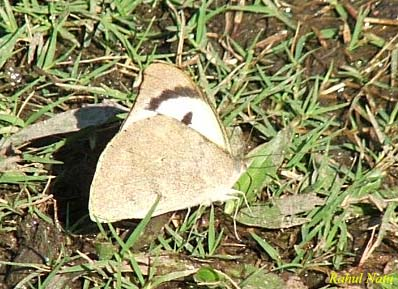

Scientific classification
- Kingdom: Animalia
- Phylum: Arthropoda
- Clade: Pancrustacea
- Class: Insecta
- Order: Lepidoptera
- Family: Pieridae
- Genus: Appias
- Species: A. lalage

Binomial name
- Appias lalage (Doubleday, 1842)

= Appias lalage =

Spot puffin

Small butterfly of the family Pieridae

Appias lalage, the spot puffin, is a small butterfly of the family Pieridae, that is, the yellows and whites, which is found in India, Indochina and Hainan.

== Description ==
Wet-season brood: Male. Upperside greyish-white; basal area of fore wing glossy. Forewing with the base of costal border thickly irrorated with grey-black scales, these scales are also more or less scattered along upper area of the cell to the discocellular black spot, the black then extending costally into a broad outer marginal decreasing band, which latter ends abruptly at the lower median, and in some specimens black scales are more or less scattered obliquely-inward to the posterior margin, thus enclosing a white spot at the angle, similar to that in the female, the anterior inner-edge of the band curves sinuously outward from the costal border above end of the cell to upper median, below which it extends quadrately inward and then outward to the lower median, the band enclosing two small white sub-apical obliquely-disposed spots, sometimes also an obscure upper spot, and a large angular spot between the upper and middle median; a more or less large black spot is also present on the lower discocellular veinlet, this spot being generally slenderly or broadly joined to the outer band along the upper median veinlet. Hindwing with a black outer-marginal narrow band, which is almost macular, and, generally, with a connecting submarginal zigzag series of blackish scales, extending inward from the lower sub-costal to the upper median, and in some these scales from thence are obscurely and broadly scattered posteriorly. Underside. Forewing greyish-white, the black discocellular spot and outer marginal band as on upperside, the band being narrowed anteriorly, the apical area being ochreoiis-yellow; from the lower end of the band some distinctly-apparent blackish scales generally extend inward towards the posterior margin. Hindwing uniformly ochreous-yellow, with slightly apparent blackish scaled submarginal zigzag slender fascia and a similar but less apparent medial fascia; a distinct black dot on the discocellular veinlet. Female. Upperside greyish- white. Forewing with the base of costa and basal two-thirds of the cell dark grey-black scaled, the black outer border broader than in male, extending hindward to the posterior angle and from thence decreasingly inward along the margin to base of the wing, its projecting portion between the upper and middle median extending broadly obliquely-inward, encompassing the discocellular spot across anterior half of the cell, thus only leaving a white narrow outwardly-oblique recurved upper band, and a broad lower white band, the basal portion of which is sometimes glossy; the extreme edge of posterior margin of the wing and its cilia being also white; sub-costal spots and a medial white spot, as on upperside, the latter being smaller, and there is also a white spot at posterior angle. Hindwing greyish-white, the basal area sometimes very faintly flashed with pale yellow; a prominently black outer-marginal band and connected submarginal zigzag fascia, the latter becoming broadly continuous and more or less confluent posteriorly. Under-side. Forewing with duller black markings similar to upperside, except that the apex is broadly pale greyish ochreous-yellow or glossy grey, with the sub-apical spots slightly indicated; the base of cell and costa being pale yellow, Hindwing paler yellow than in male, or greyish-white and slightly glossy, the yellow being more clearly defined along the vein borders and extreme outer margin, with slightly apparent dusky-scaled submarginal and medial zigzag fascia, and discocellular black dot, as in the male, the outer marginal interspaces being whitish and somewhat glossy. Body greyish-white; front and abdomen above dark grey; antennae black above, white beneath in the male; anal tufts blackish; intromittent organ sometimes exserted.

Intermediate form: Male. Upperside. Forewing with the black outer band somewhat narrower, the projecting discal portion and the discocellular spot generally smaller, the latter being usually isolated; three sub-apical white spots are sometimes present; the median interspaced white spot is larger. Hindwing with narrower black outer-marginal macular band, or its spots are slenderly defined only at end of the veins. Underside. Forewing similar to the upperside, the apex paler yellow than in wet form. Hindwing similar to wet form, but generally of a paler yellow. Female. Upperside. Forewing similar to the wet form, except that the black outer band is less intensely black from the lower median and extends obsolescently inward to about half the posterior margin. Hindwing with the black outer-marginal band less intense than in the wet form, more macular, its connected submarginal zigzag fascia less defined and becomes obsolescent posteriorly from the upper median. Underside similar to wet form. Forewing with the outer band less defined posteriorly from the lower median. Hindwing pale yellow; marginal interspaces whitish, but not glossy.

Dry season: Male. Smaller than wet form. Upperside. Forewing with the base glossy, the black outer band somewhat narrower, and its discal portion more or less disconnected, its posterior end always terminating at the lower median; the discocellular spot smaller and always isolated. Hindwing either with a slight black linear tip to the upper veins, or entirely white. Underside. Forewing with the black outer band less prominent than in wet form, also narrower and its course broken, the apical area being pale greyish-ochreous and slightly irrorated with brown scales, the discocellular spot isolated. Hindwing pale brownish-ochreous, more or less slightly irrorated with brown scales, the submarginal and discal zigzag brownish-scaled fascia slightly-defined, the discocellular black dot distinct. Female. Smaller than wet form. Upperside. Forewing with the base glossy; the black outer band similar, its lower end terminating either at the lower median or with some scattered scales inwardly-disposed before the posterior angle; the discocellular spot either slightly extending along upper median, or broadly joined to the discal portion of the outer band, and inwardly along upper area of the cell. Hindwing with the black outer marginal band macular and decreasing obsolescently hindward, or the band is more continuous and with a more or less slightly apparent blackish-scaled submarginal zigzag fascia. Underside. Forewing with similar black markings as on upperside, the apical area being greyish-ochreous and brown-scaled, the base of the cell flushed with greyish-ochreous. Hindwing pale greyish-ochreous and numerously irrorated with brown scales except in the outer-marginal interspaces where these scales are less apparent, the discal and submarginal darker-scaled zigzag fascia and black discocellular dot distinct.

— Frederic Moore, Lepidoptera Indica. Vol. VI

== See also ==
- List of butterflies of India (Pieridae)
