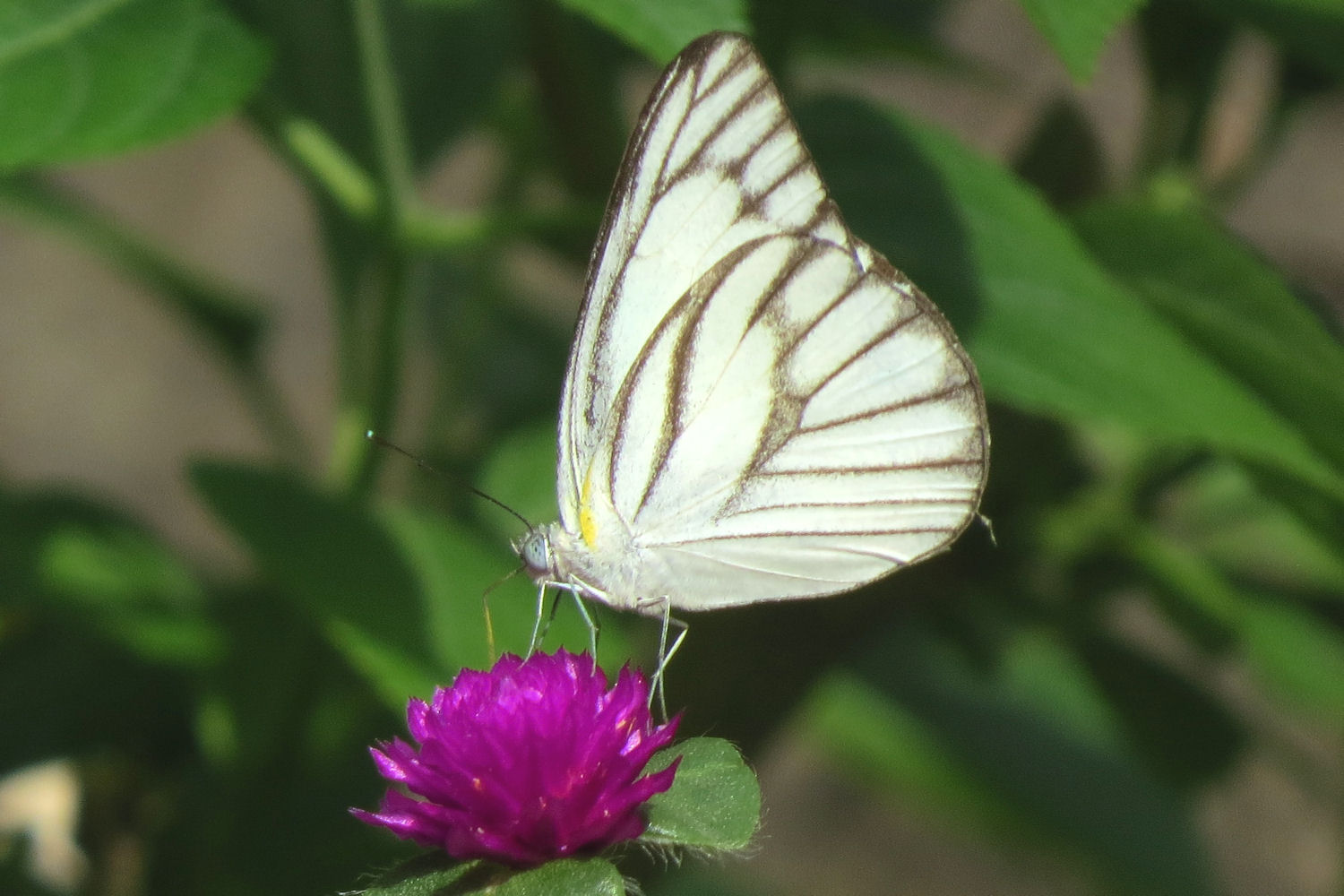
- Male, Vietnam
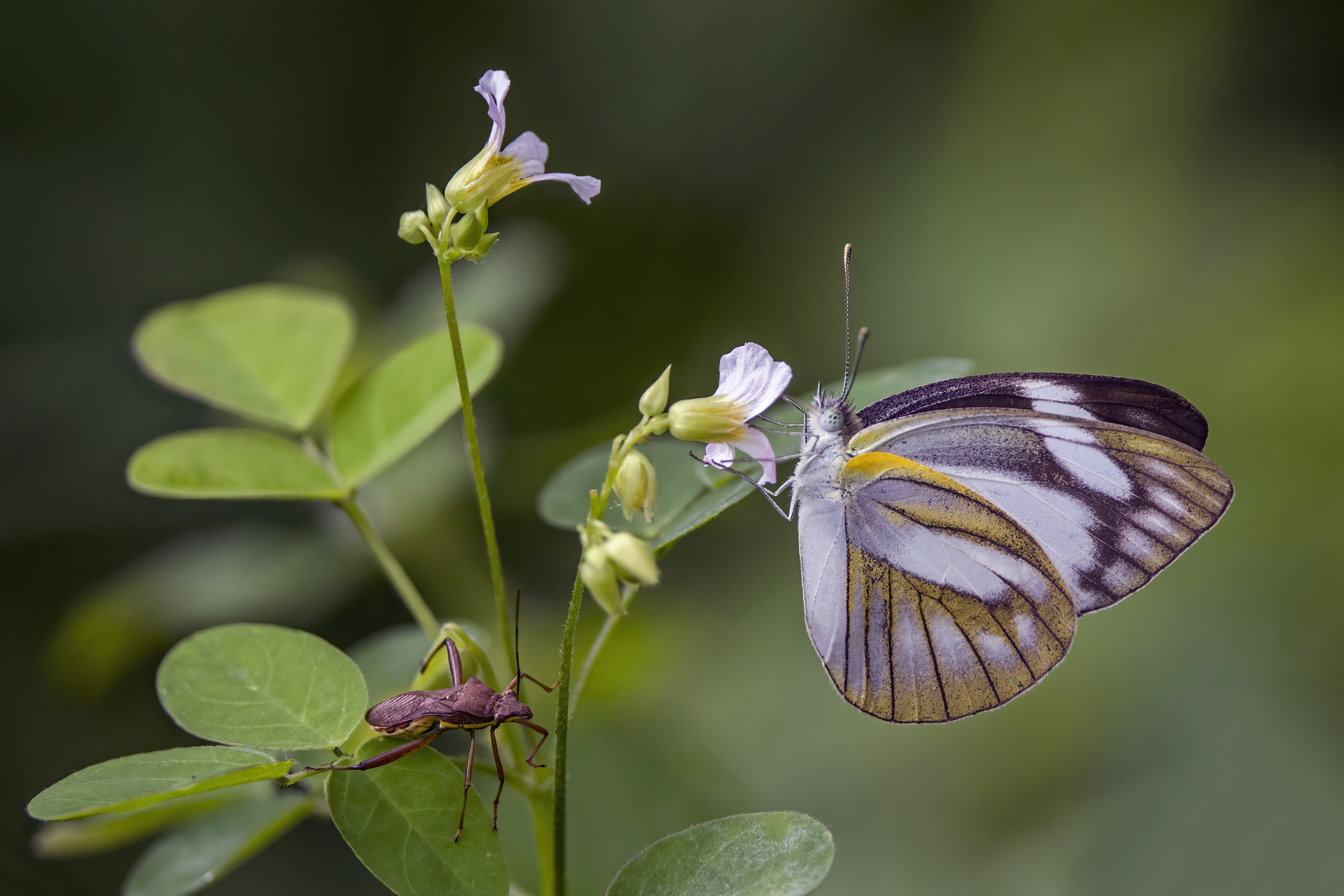
- Female, Thailand

Scientific classification
- Kingdom: Animalia
- Phylum: Arthropoda
- Clade: Pancrustacea
- Class: Insecta
- Order: Lepidoptera
- Family: Pieridae
- Genus: Appias
- Species: A. olferna

Binomial name
- Appias olferna C. Swinhoe, 1890

Synonyms
- Papilio zelmira Stoll, [1780]; Appias irvini C. Swinhoe, 1890; Appias libythea f. sopara Fruhstorfer, 1910

= Appias olferna =

Eastern striped albatross

Species of butterfly

Appias olferna, the eastern striped albatross or Bengal albatross, is a species of butterfly in the family Pieridae. The species was first described by Charles Swinhoe in 1890.

== Description ==
The wingspan is about 50–60 mm. The ground colour of the wings is white. Males have thin black veins on the upper side of the wings and a narrow black border along the edges. Females: the pattern is much more pronounced; the black stripes along the veins are wider, giving the wings a striped or greyish look.

== Distribution ==
Appias olferna is native to southern Asia and south-western Oceania.

The species is found from Bengal to Assam in India; in Myanmar, Laos, and Vietnam in Indochina; and on Christmas Island off Australia.

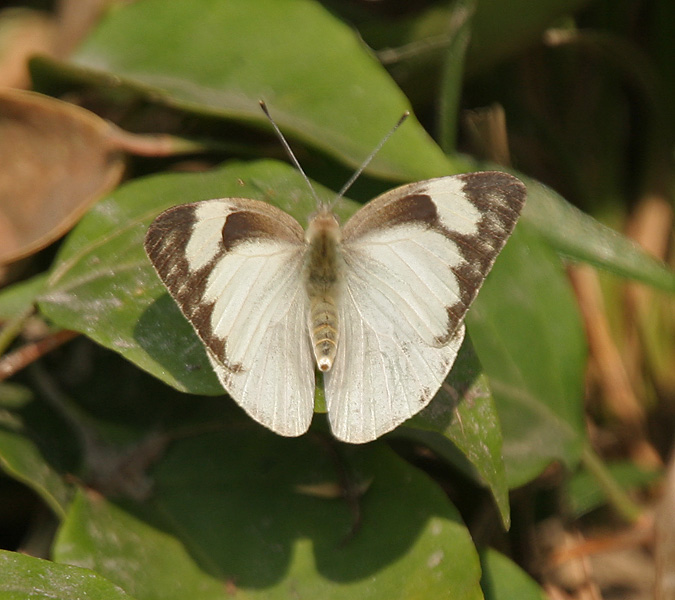
Female (dry-season form)
