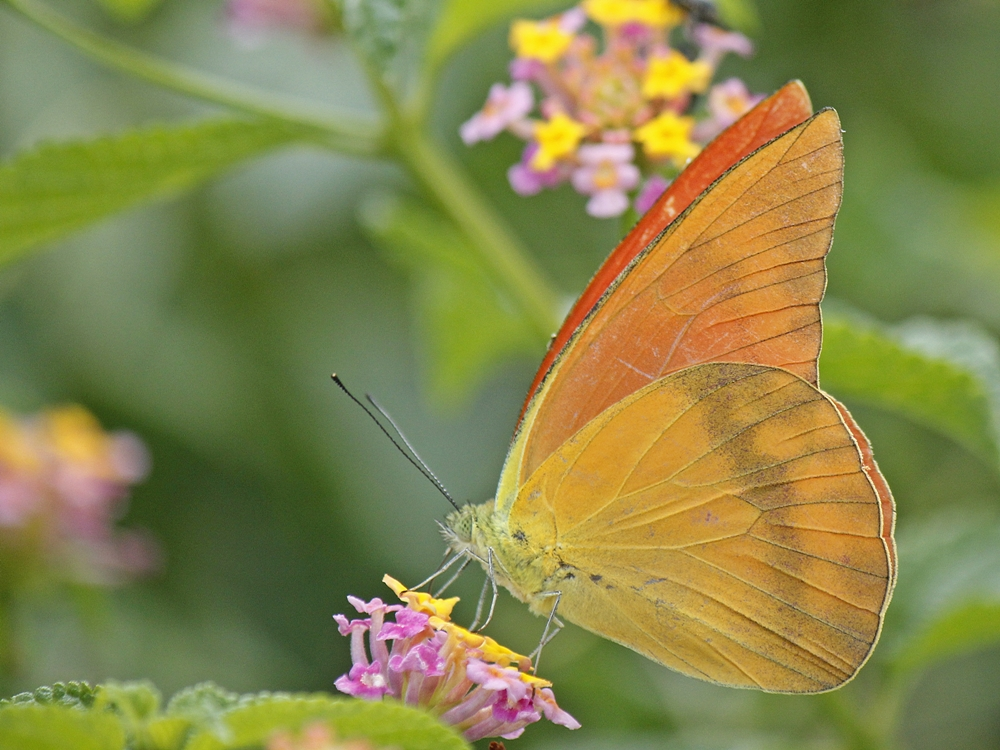
- At Tomohon, North Sulawesi

Scientific classification
- Kingdom: Animalia
- Phylum: Arthropoda
- Clade: Pancrustacea
- Class: Insecta
- Order: Lepidoptera
- Family: Pieridae
- Genus: Appias
- Species: A. zarinda

Binomial name
- Appias zarinda (Boisduval, 1836)

Synonyms
- Pieris zarinda Boisduval, 1836; Pieris fatime Vollenhoven, 1866; Tachyris bouruensis Wallace, 1867; Tachyris phestus Westwood, 1888; Tachyris nero sulana Fruhstorfer, 1899

= Appias zarinda =

Eastern orange albatross

Species of butterfly

Appias zarinda, the eastern orange albatross, is a butterfly of the family Pieridae that is found on Sulawesi and the Maluku Islands, Indonesia.

== Subspecies and distribution ==
- A. z. zarinda (Sulawesi, Kabaena, Tukangbesi Islands, and Peleng Island: Banggai Islands)
- A. z. bouruensis (Wallace, 1867) (Buru)
- A. z. phestus (Westwood, 1888) (Sangihe Islands and Talise Islands)
- A. z. sulana (Fruhstorfer, 1899) (Mangole Island: Sula Islands)
