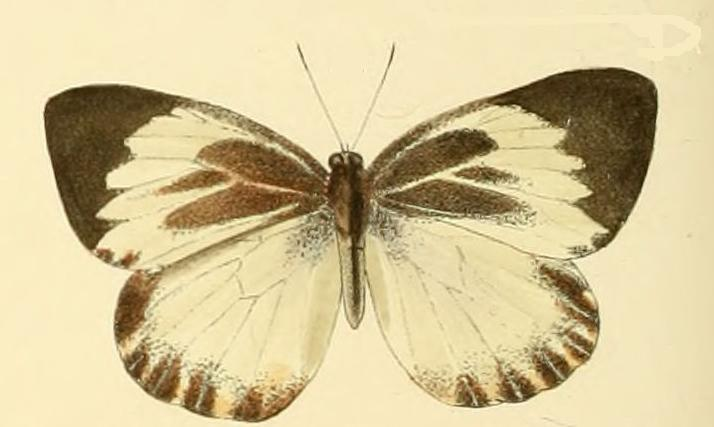
- Phrissura aegis

Scientific classification
- Kingdom: Animalia
- Phylum: Arthropoda
- Clade: Pancrustacea
- Class: Insecta
- Order: Lepidoptera
- Family: Pieridae
- Genus: Phrissura; Butler, 1870
- Species: P. aegis

Binomial name
- Phrissura aegis (C. & R. Felder, 1861)

Synonyms
- Pieris aegis C. & R. Felder, 1861; Phrissura aegis (C. & R. Felder, 1861); Appias (Phrissura) aegis (C. & R. Felder, 1861); Pieris illana C. & R. Felder, 1862; Pieris cynis Hewitson, 1866; Udaiana cynis (Hewitson, 1866); Udaiana cynis f. androides Hagen, 1894; Udaiana cynis tiomana Moulton, 1923

= Phrissura =

Monotypic butterfly genus in family Pieridae

Phrissura is a genus of butterflies in the family Pieridae. The genus (or subgenus) is often presented as monotypic containing the single species Phrissura aegis. However, in some schemes, Phrissura is presented as a subgenus of Appias. In some works, P. a. cynis (Hewitson, [1866]) has been recognised as a distinct species, sometimes even placed in its own genus as Udaiana cynis (Hewitson, [1866]).

The following subspecies may be recognized: Eastern lineages, i.e. Eastern forest white butterflies

- P. a. aegina Fruhstorfer, 1899 – Indonesia (South Sulawesi)
- P. a. aegis (C. & R. Felder, 1861) – Philippines (Mindanao)
- P. a. caepia Fruhstorfer – Philippines (Palawan)
- P. a. gerasa Fruhstorfer, 1910 – Indonesia (Sula Islands)
- P. a. illana (C. & R. Felder, 1862) – Philippines (Luzon)
- P. a. polisma (Hewitson, [1861]) – Indonesia (North Sulawesi)

Western lineages [=Udaiana], i.e. Western forest white butterflies

- P. a. cynis (Hewitson, [1866]) – Thailand, Malaysia (Peninsular Malaya), Indonesia (Sumatra)
- P. a. pryeri (Distant, 1885) – Malaysia (Sabah [Borneo] possibly Pulau Tioman, Pulau Aur)

[Note: Individuals from Malaysia Tioman Island were described as Udaiana cynis tiomana Moulton, 1923; others from Philippines, Sulu Archipelago as Udaiana cynis suluensis Schröder & Treadaway, 1989].

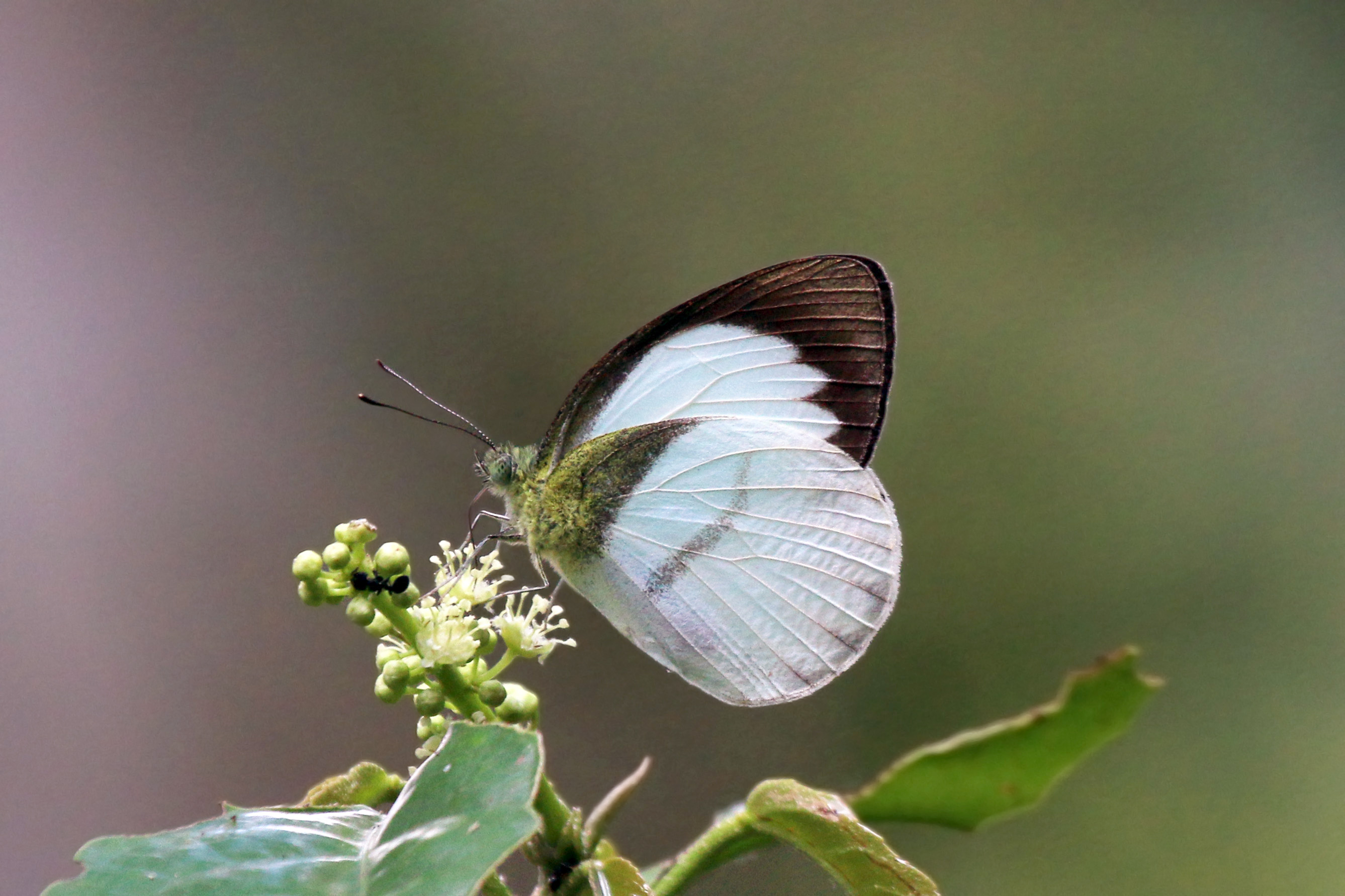
P. a. cynis in Borneo (side view)

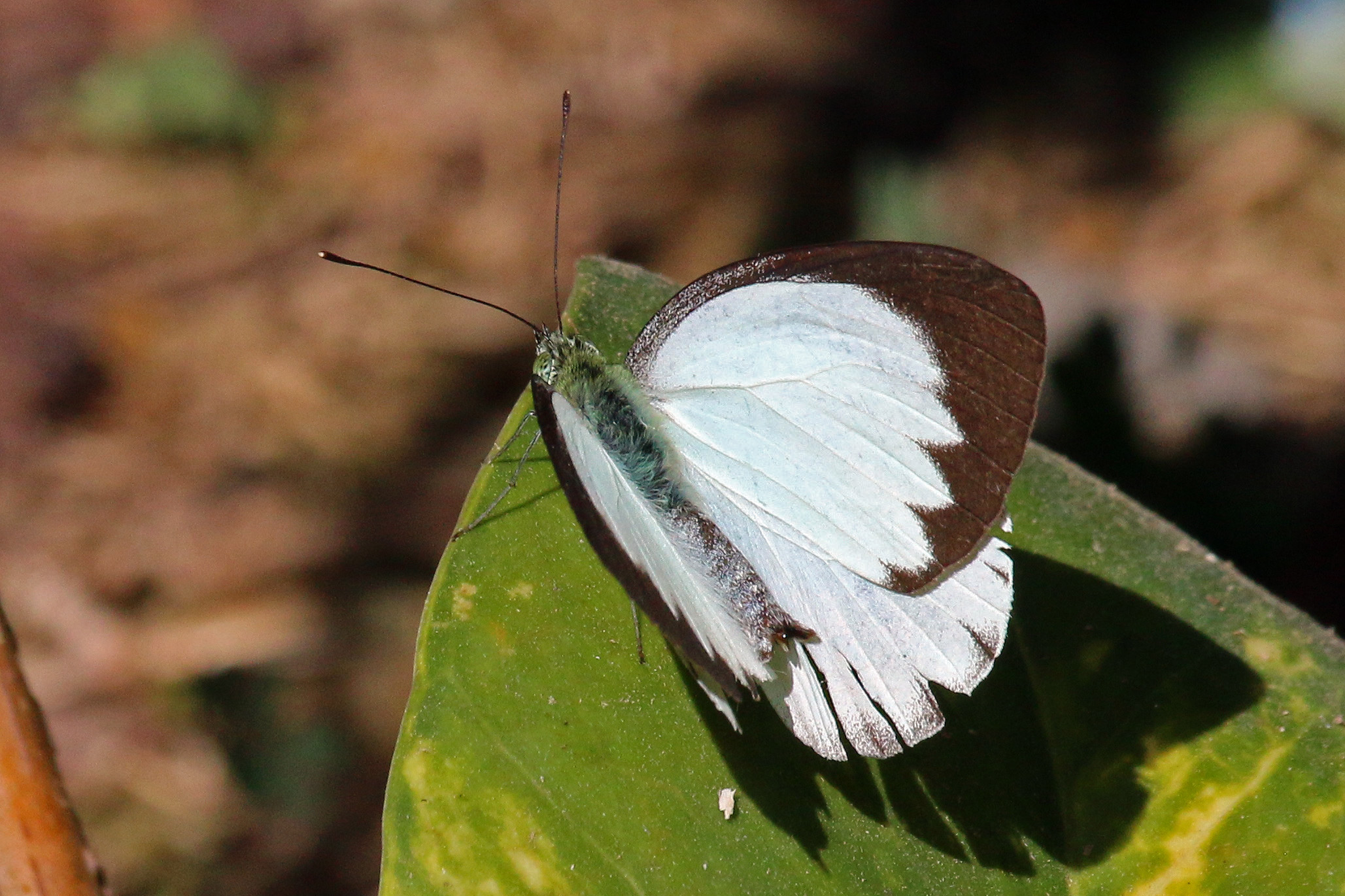
P. a. cynis in Borneo (upper)
