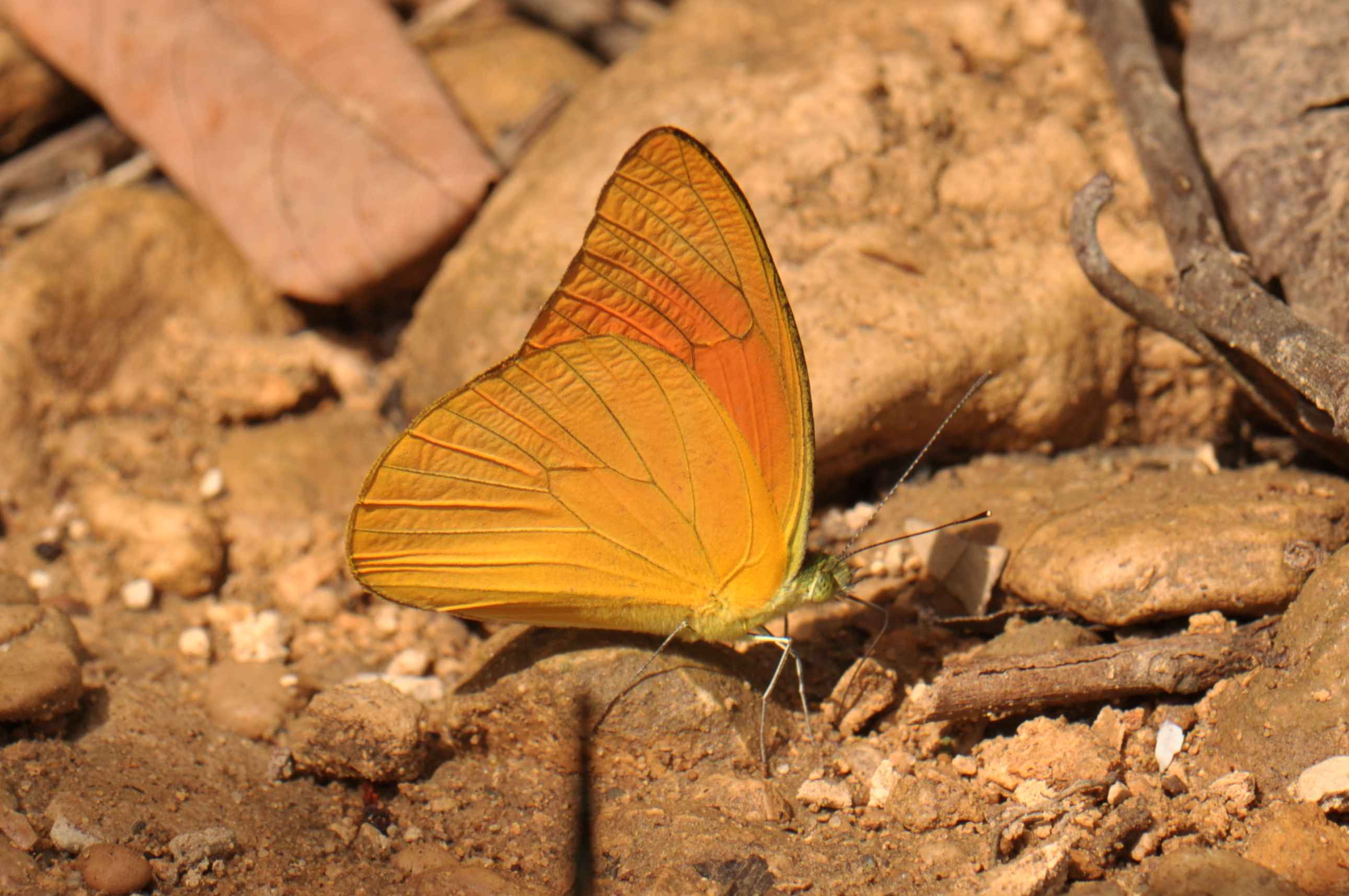

Scientific classification
- Kingdom: Animalia
- Phylum: Arthropoda
- Clade: Pancrustacea
- Class: Insecta
- Order: Lepidoptera
- Family: Pieridae
- Genus: Appias
- Species: A. nero

Binomial name
- Appias nero (Wallace, 1867)

= Appias nero =

Orange albatross

Species of butterfly

Appias nero, the orange albatross, is a butterfly of the family Pieridae. The species occurs from northern India to the Sunda Islands, the Philippines, Sulawesi and eastwards. Subspecies Appias nero galba is found in India.

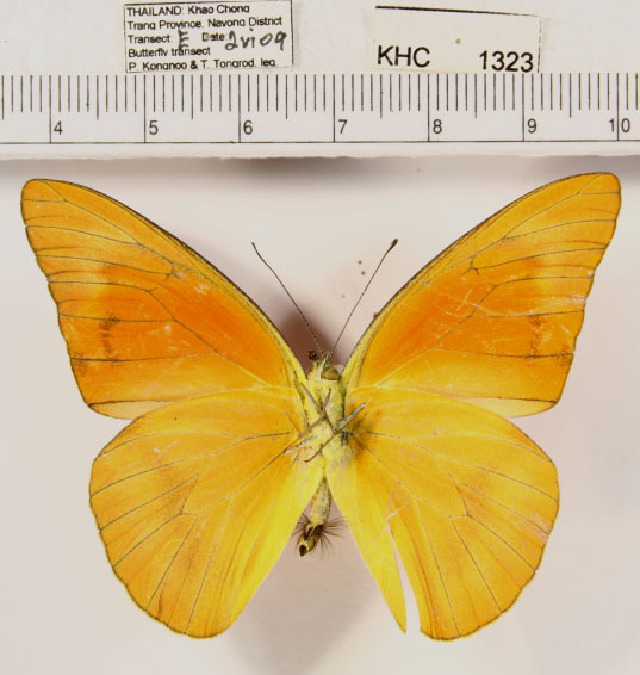
Ventral view

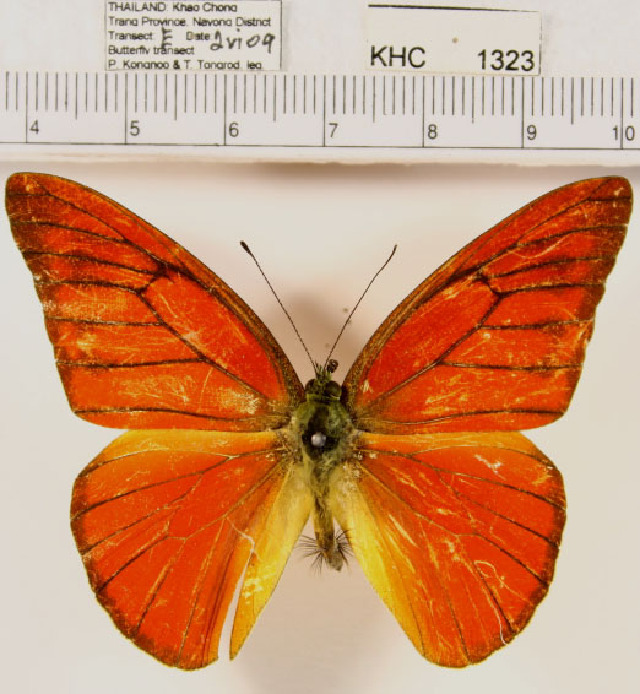
Dorsal view

== Status ==
The species is common.

== Gallery ==
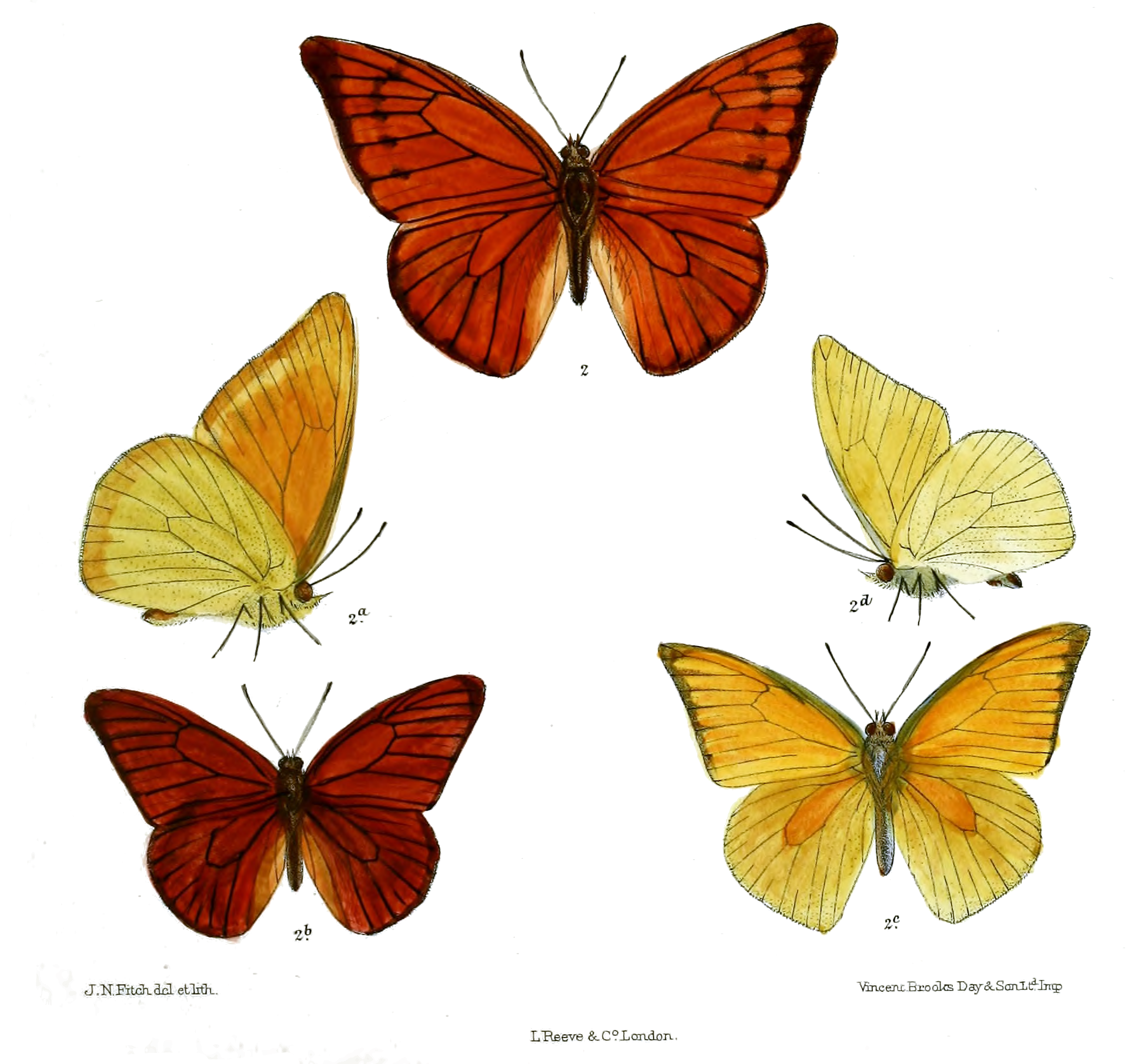
A. n. galba

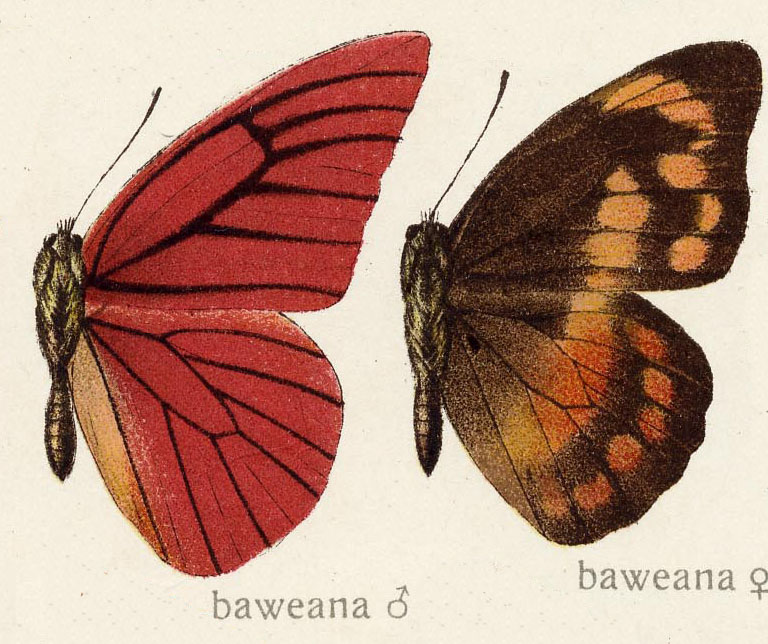
A. n. baweana

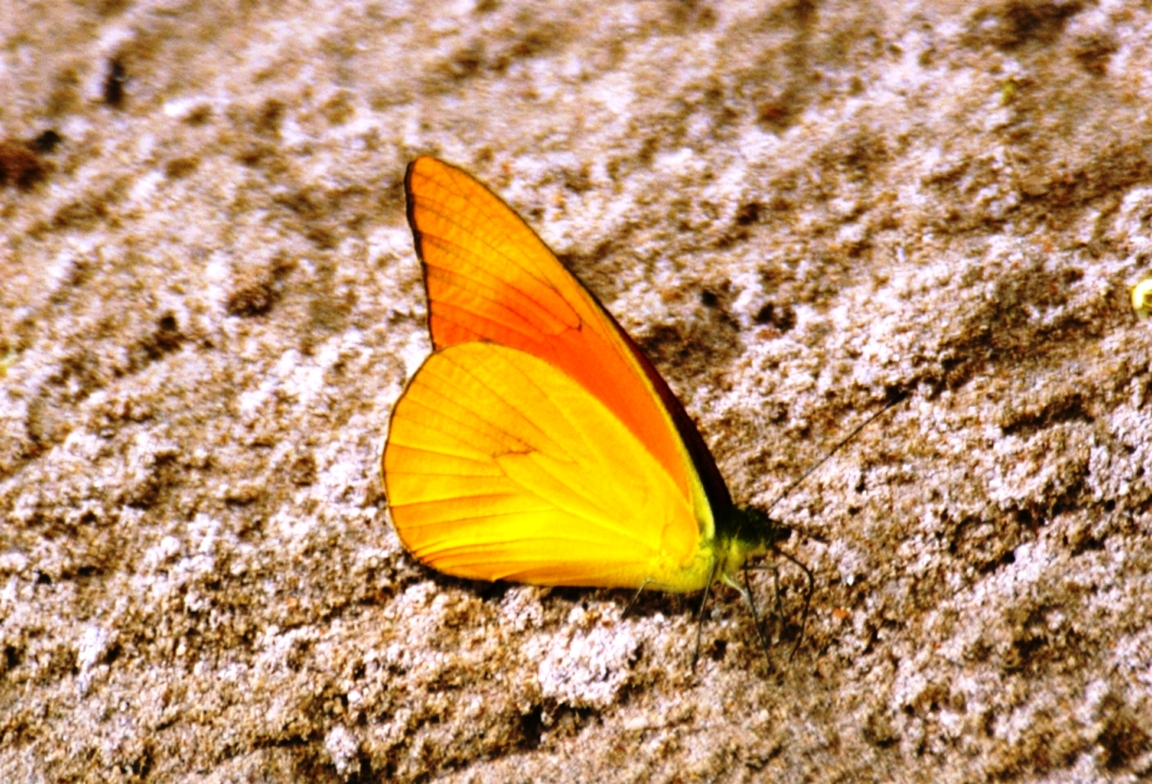
