= Sibangea =

Scientific classification
- Kingdom: Plantae
- Clade: Tracheophytes
- Clade: Angiosperms
- Clade: Eudicots
- Clade: Rosids
- Order: Malpighiales
- Family: Putranjivaceae
- Genus: Sibangea; Oliv.

Genus of flowering plants

Sibangea is a plant genus of the family Putranjivaceae, first described as a genus in 1883. It is sometimes included in Drypetes. It is native to central Africa.

Species

- Sibangea arborescens Oliv. - Cameroon, Gabon
- Sibangea pleioneura Radcl.-Sm. - Tanzania
- Sibangea similis (Hutch.) Radcl.-Sm. - Cameroon, Gabon, Nigeria
