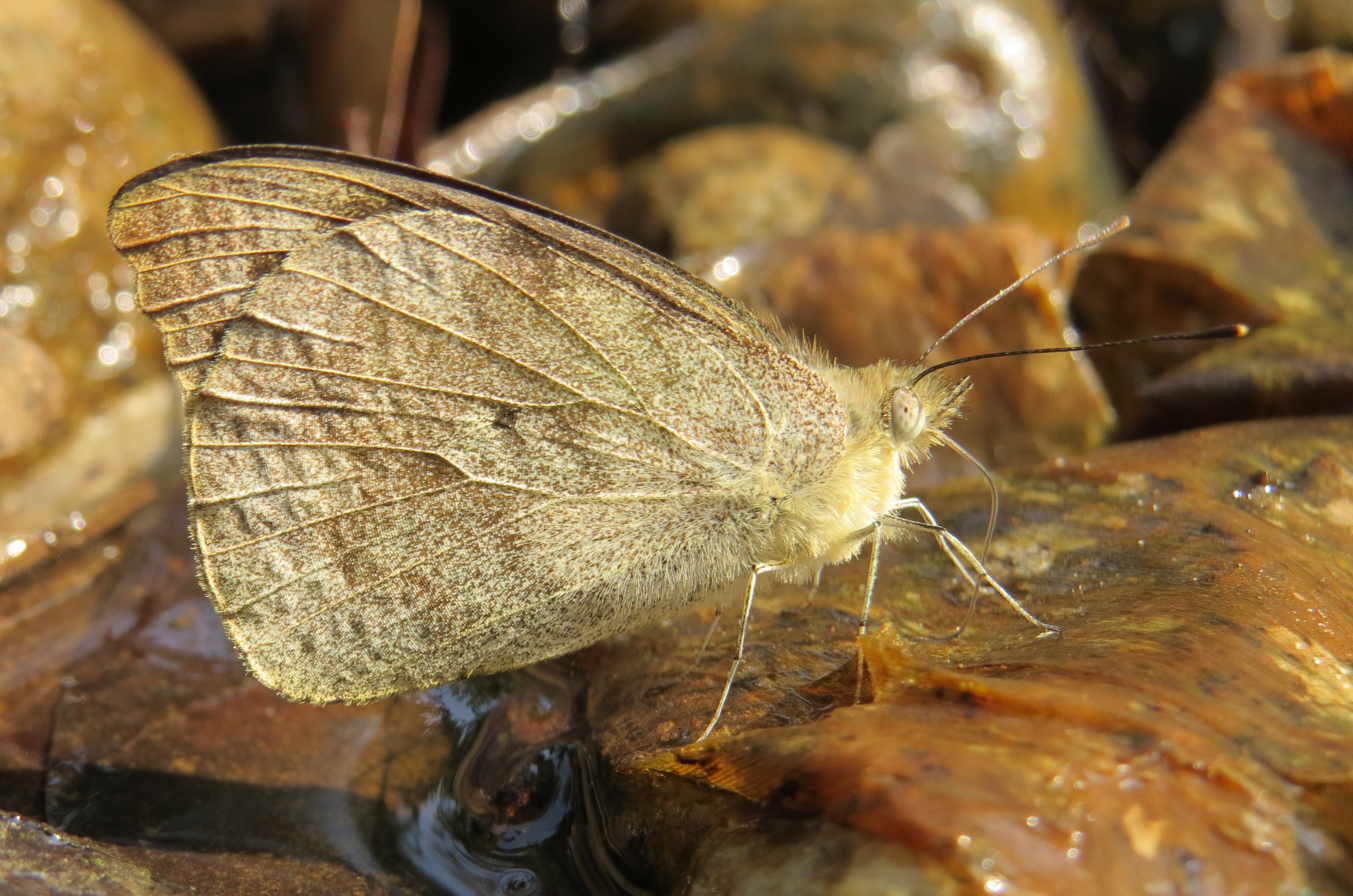

Scientific classification
- Kingdom: Animalia
- Phylum: Arthropoda
- Clade: Pancrustacea
- Class: Insecta
- Order: Lepidoptera
- Family: Pieridae
- Genus: Appias
- Species: A. indra

Binomial name
- Appias indra Moore, 1857

= Appias indra =

Plain puffin

Small butterfly of the Family Pieridae

Appias indra, the plain puffin, is a small butterfly of the family Pieridae, that is, the yellows and whites, which is found in south and southeast Asia.

== Description ==
Wet-season brood: Male. Upper-side greyish-white. Fore-wing with the base of costal border grey-black scaled and merging into a black broad apical outer-marginal decreasing band, which terminates narrowly at the lower median veinlet, the band curving outward from the costal border to upper median, then extends inward more or less quadrately in the next interspace, and again outward narrowly to the lower median; three or four white spots before the apex, the upper and lower the smallest; a minute black dot is generally present on the lower discocellular veinlet. Hind-wing with a few black scales slenderly disposed anteriorly along outer margin and on tip of the veins, and a minute dot on upper end of the discocellular veinlet. Underside. Fore-wing greyish-white; with the outer black band subapically restricted and narrow, the apical area being pale yellow, the spots of upper-side being slightly indicated, the black discocellular dot also visible. Hind-wing pale yellow, with more or less very slightly-defined brownish-scaled discal and submarginal zigzag fasciae, and a distinct black discocellular dot. Female. Upper-side fuliginous-black. Fore-wing with a central longitudinal greyish-white patch, its outer edge being sinuous and its basal area dark grey scaled; two small oblique sub-apical white spots; cilia white posteriorly. Hindwing with the basal and discal area greyish fuliginous-brown and the veins greyish-white lined, the cell and abdominal area with long fine grey hairs; two upper submarginal small greyish-white spots; cilia white. Underside. Forewing with similar black outer border, shaped as on upper-side, the apex being ochreous-yellow, and the white spots less defined; discal area greyish-white, the base suffused with sulphur-yellow. Hindwing ochreous-yellow, very sparsely irrorated with minute brown scales, irregularly traversed by a discal and submarginal zigzag brown-scaled fasciae, and outer marginal white interspaces; a brown discocellular dot. Dry-season brood: Male. Somewhat smaller than wet-season form. Upperside. Similar. Forewing with narrower and less prominent black outer band, which ends usually above the lower median veinlet, and its enclosed white spots generally larger, there being usually five in number. Hindwing unmarked. Underside. Forewing with the outer black band narrower than in wet form and obsolescent posteriorly, or entirely absent, its position indicated only by a few dark scales, the apex being pale yellowish-white speckled with brownish scales, Hindwing pale yellowish-white, more or less speckled with minute brown scales and traversed by a discal and submarginal zigzag fascia, but in some specimens these brown scales and fasciae are almost obsolete; the discocellular black dot always present. Female. Upperside. Forewing with broader greyish-white area and less black-scaled posterior border than in wet form. Hindwing with the basal and discal area greyish-white, the outer black border enclosing a submarginal row of large whitish irregular-shaped spots. Underside similar to wet form, Forewing with the black outer band somewhat narrower and with a white spot at the posterior angle. Hind-wing more numerously brown scaled.

— Frederic Moore, Lepidoptera Indica. Vol. VI

== Food plants ==
Drypetes oblongifolia and Putranjiva roxburghii, both from the plant family Putranjivaceae.

== See also ==
- Pieridae
- List of butterflies of India
- List of butterflies of India (Pieridae)
