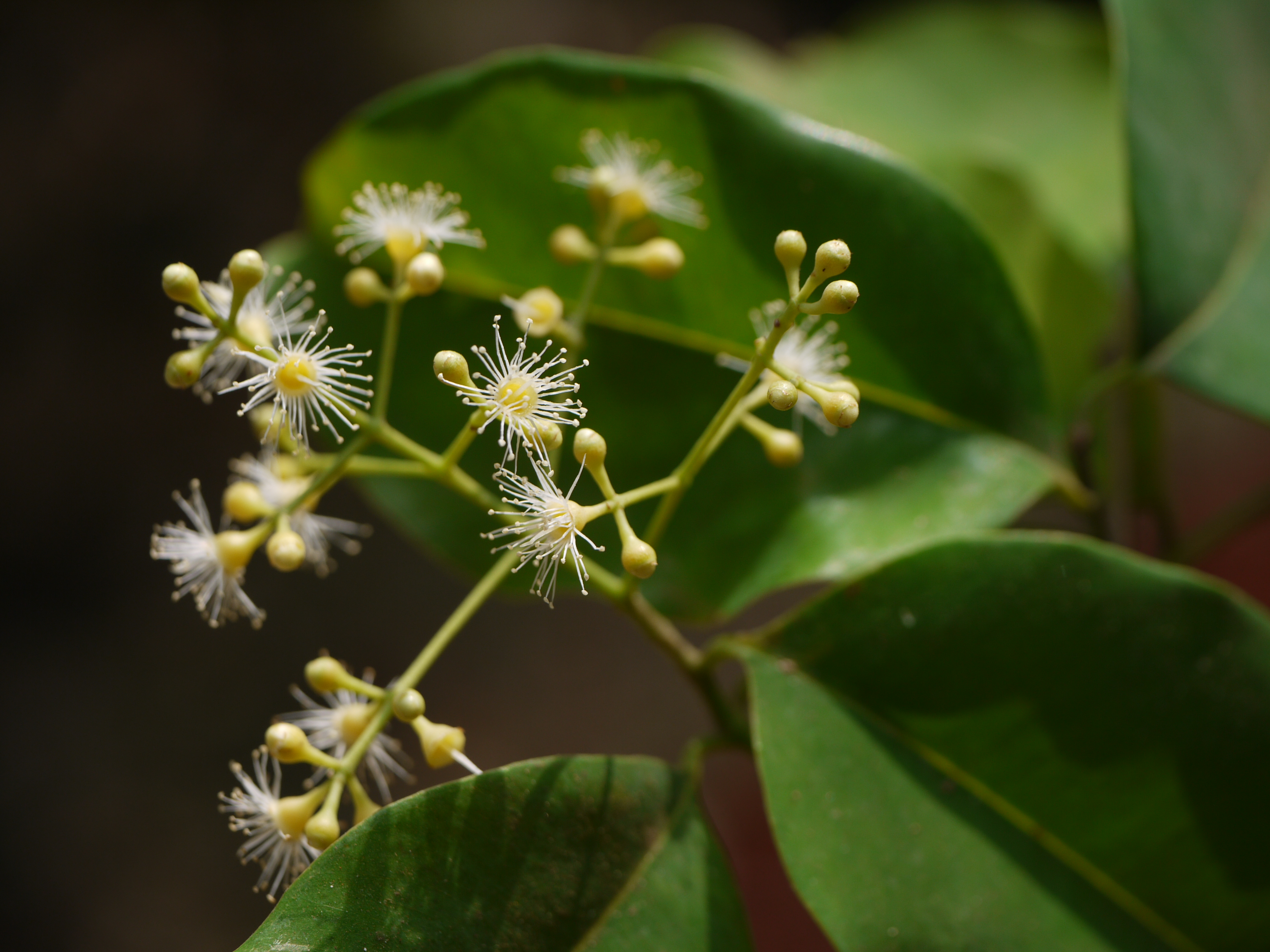

Conservation status
- Least Concern (IUCN 3.1)

Scientific classification
- Kingdom: Plantae
- Clade: Tracheophytes
- Clade: Angiosperms
- Clade: Eudicots
- Clade: Rosids
- Order: Myrtales
- Family: Myrtaceae
- Genus: Syzygium
- Species: S. gardneri

Binomial name
- Syzygium gardneri Thwaites

Synonyms
- Eugenia gardneri (Thwaites) Bedd.; Eugenia kanarensis Talbot; Syzygium dhaneshianum Ratheesh, Shareef & Nandakumar; Syzygium kanarense (Talbot) Raizada

= Syzygium gardneri =

Species of flowering plant

Syzygium gardneri is a species of flowering plant in the family Myrtaceae. It is a tree native to southwestern India and Sri Lanka. It grows in the southern Western Ghats of Karnataka, Kerala, and Tamil Nadu. It is a canopy tree in lowland and montane tropical evergreen moist forests from 200 to 1,400 metres elevation. It is associated with Syzygium laetum, Vateria indica, Palaquium ellipticum, Elaeocarpus tuberculatus, Calophyllum polyanthum, and other trees. The fruits are a source of food for birds and mammals.

The species was described by George Henry Kendrick Thwaites in 1859.
