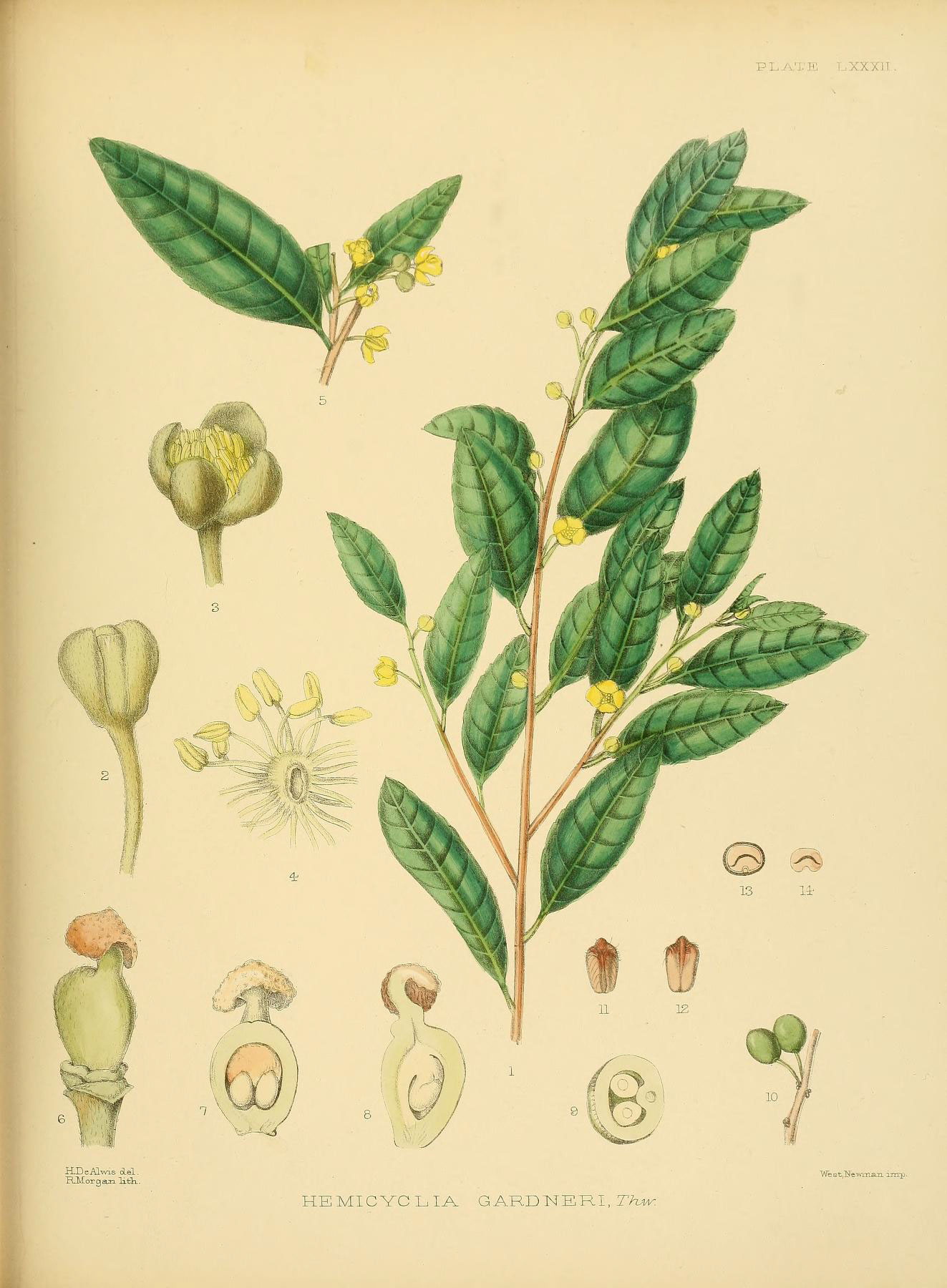

Scientific classification
- Kingdom: Plantae
- Clade: Tracheophytes
- Clade: Angiosperms
- Clade: Eudicots
- Clade: Rosids
- Order: Malpighiales
- Family: Putranjivaceae
- Genus: Drypetes
- Species: D. gardneri

Binomial name
- Drypetes gardneri (Thwaites) Pax & K.Hoffm.

Synonyms
- Hemicyclia gardneri Thwaites

= Drypetes gardneri =

Species of tree

Drypetes gardneri is a species of small tree or large shrub in the family Putranjivaceae.
