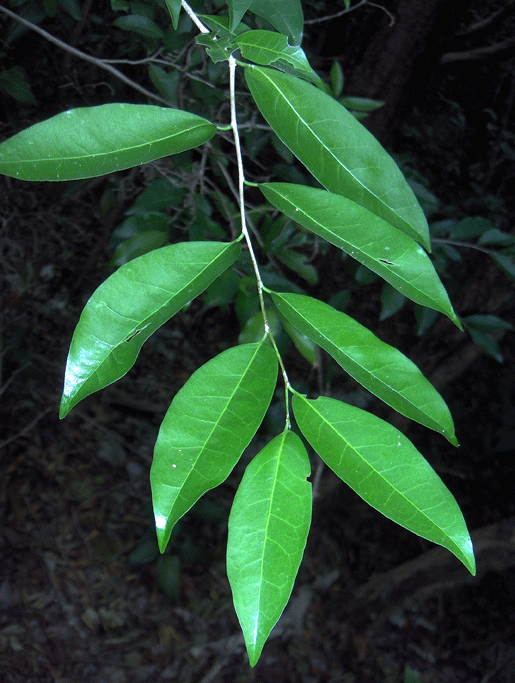
- Leaves

Conservation status
- Least Concern (IUCN 3.1)

Scientific classification
- Kingdom: Plantae
- Clade: Tracheophytes
- Clade: Angiosperms
- Clade: Eudicots
- Clade: Rosids
- Order: Malpighiales
- Family: Putranjivaceae
- Genus: Drypetes
- Species: D. lateriflora

Binomial name
- Drypetes lateriflora (Sw.) Krug & Urb.

Synonyms
- Drypetes lateriflora var. guatemalensis Pax & K.Hoffm.; Forchhammeria lanceolata Standl.; Schaefferia lateriflora Sw.

= Drypetes lateriflora =

Species of plant

Drypetes lateriflora, the Guiana plum, is a species of flowering plant in the family Putranjivaceae. It is native to Mexico, Central America, southern Florida, and the Caribbean. A tree reaching 30 ft (9 m), it is typically found in hammocks. It is assessed as Least Concern.
