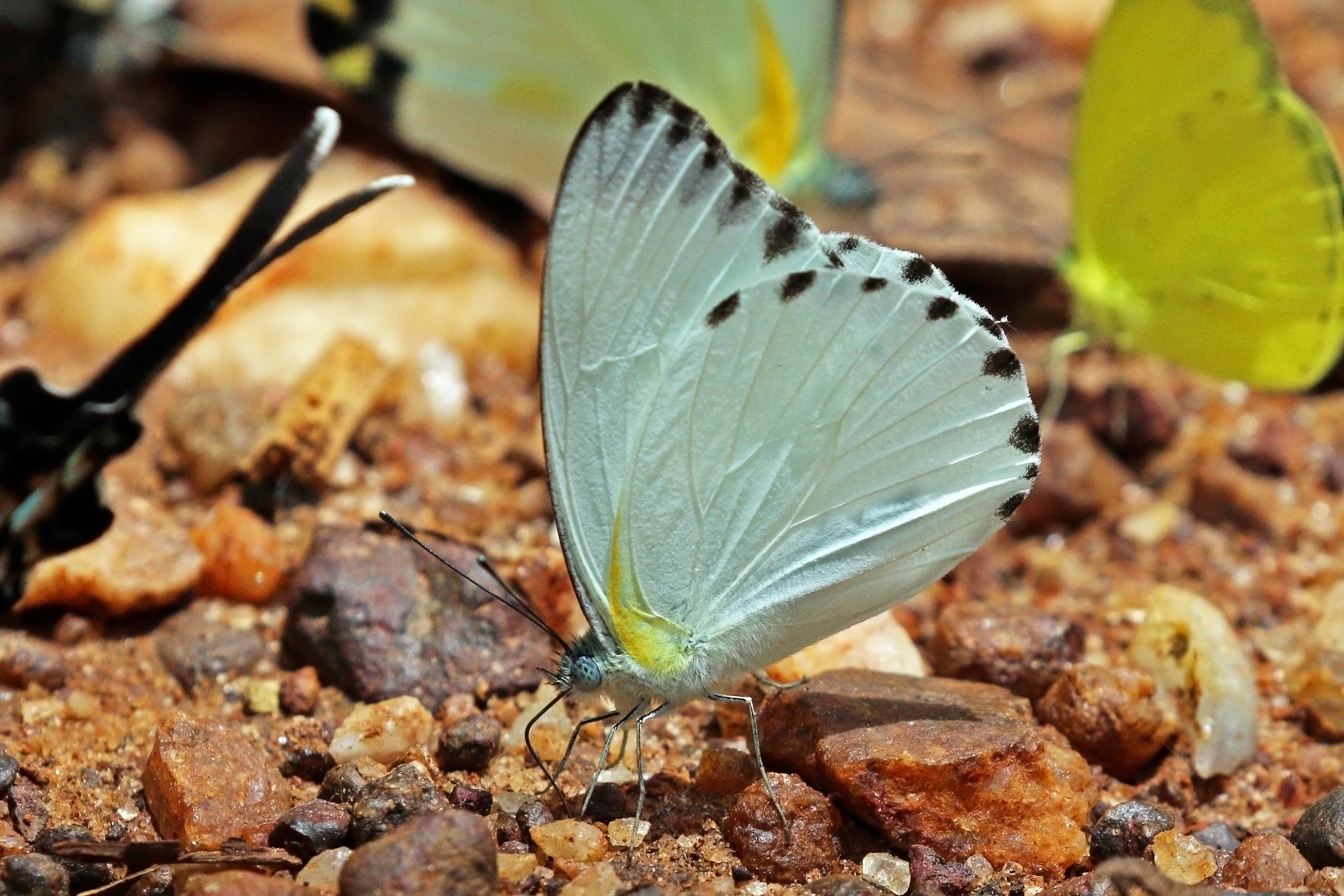
- Appias sabina sabina, Ghana
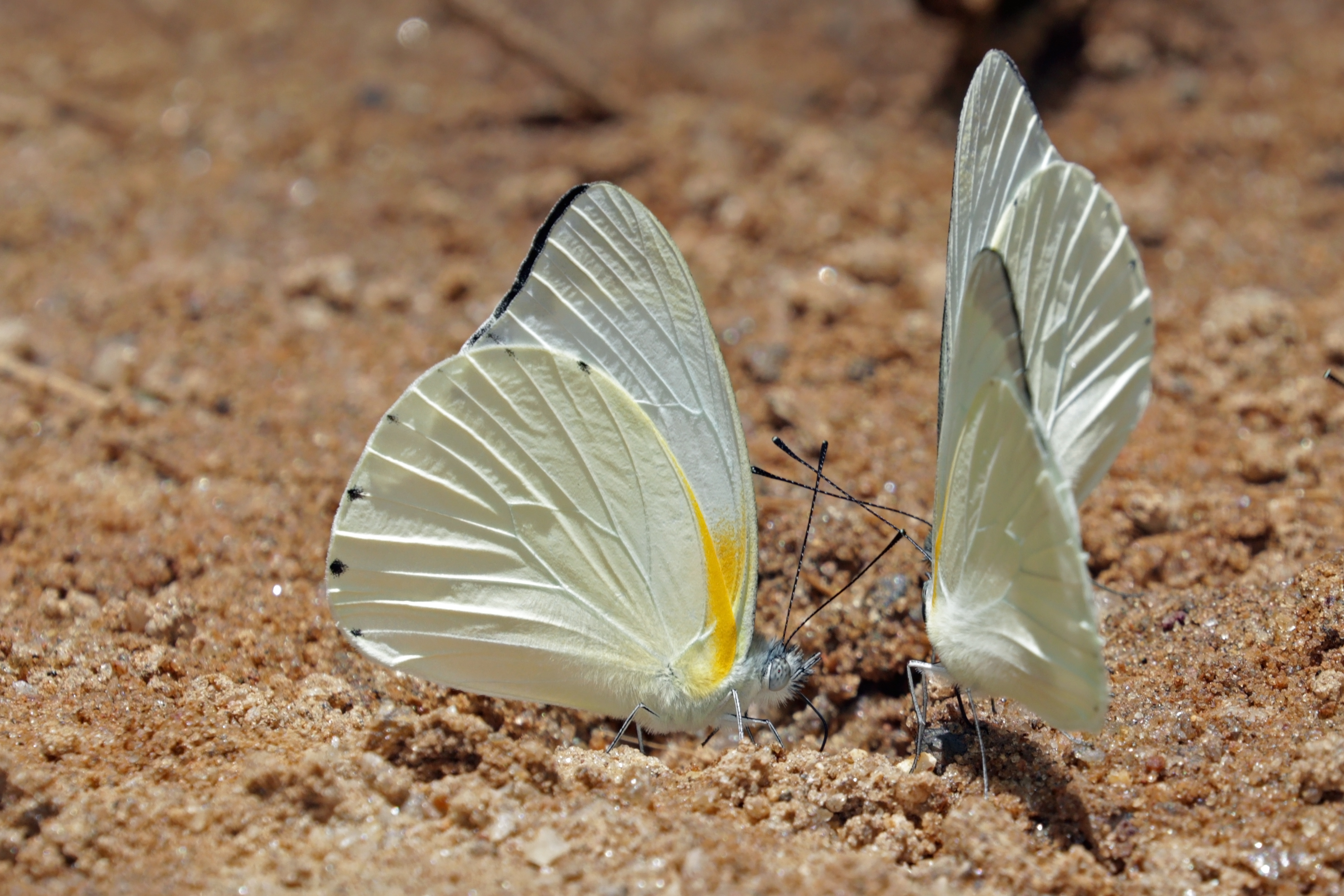
- Appias sabina confusa, Madagascar

Scientific classification
- Kingdom: Animalia
- Phylum: Arthropoda
- Clade: Pancrustacea
- Class: Insecta
- Order: Lepidoptera
- Family: Pieridae
- Genus: Appias
- Species: A. sabina

Binomial name
- Appias sabina (C. & R. Felder, [1865])

Synonyms
- Pieris sabina C. & R. Felder, [1865]; Appias weberi Suffert, 1904; Belenois confusa Butler, 1872; Appias udei Suffert, 1904; Appias haendeli Suffert, 1904; Appias sabina var. latimarginata Gaede, 1916; Appias sabina var. defecta Gaede, 1916; Appias sabina f. divisapex Hulstaert, 1924; Appias sabina sabina f. bicolor Talbot, 1943; Appias sabina f. reversa Stoneham, 1957; Belenois coniata Butler, 1879; Papilio hecyra Mabille, 1880; Mylothris majungana Grose-Smith, 1891; Pieris (Phrissura) coniata f. hemichlora Mabille, 1898; Appias sabina f. euphrosyne Stoneham, 1957; Phrissura phoebe Butler, 1901; Appias isokani var. dubia Aurivillius, 1899; Appias sabina f. semiepaphia Strand, 1911; Appias sabina f. thalia Stoneham, 1957; Appias sabina f. absyrtus Stoneham, 1957; Appias sabina f. epaphioides Stoneham, 1957

= Appias sabina =

Species of butterfly

Appias sabina, the Sabine albatross or albatross white, is a butterfly of the family Pieridae. It is found in Africa. The habitat consists of forests.

== Description ==
The wingspan is 44–55 millimetres (1.7–2.2 in) for males and 44–53 mm (1.7–2.1 in) for females. Adults are on wing year-round.

The males are known for their fast flight, patrolling specific routes in search of females. However, the females remain near to the undergrowth and fly relatively very slowly.

=== Female ===
The upperside is white with a black apex (or vertex), prominent black marginal spots at the ends of veins, which are larger in size than in males. The hindwing is pale yellow, which gradually darkens towards the body. The basal area of the underside of the forewing varies, as it can be orange or grey depending on location. It features black marginal markings.

Torben Larsen developed a species numbering system for his 2005 publication Butterflies of West Africa. This species is #86. The 'Larsen' numbers have since been used with permission in A Sharp Eye on Butterflies of Ghana.

== Habitat and distribution ==
Its type locality is Guinea, and the distribution spans across much of sub-Saharan Africa, including Sierra Leone, Nigeria, Equatorial Guinea, the Democratic Republic of Congo, Uganda, Sudan, Ethiopia, Kenya, Tanzania, Zambia, Malawi, Zimbabwe, Mozambique, Eswatini, Pondoland, and South Africa.

These butterflies are typically confined to specific areas in forests, due to the restricted presence of food plant. In South Africa, A. sabina adults are noted from February to May in notable localities like Woodbush and Legalameetse in Limpopo Province, Dhlinza and Ngoye Forests and Mvutshini Valley in KwaZulu-Natal, and areas near Mbyoti and Port St Johns in the Eastern Cape.

== Life cycle and behavior ==
The larvae are observed to feed on the following plants (William 2002):

- Drypetes gerrardi (Euphorbiaceae) [Pringle, et al., 1994: 298].
- Drypetes ugandensis (Euphorbiaceae) [Heath, et al., 2002: 33].
- Drypetes sp. (Euphorbiaceae) [Larsen, 1991: 146].
- Phyllanthus (Euphorbiaceae) [Larsen, 1991: 146].
- Ritchiea fragrans (Capparaceae) [Larsen, 1991: 146].
- Boscia (Capparaceae) [Larsen, 1991: 146].

== Subspecies ==
- Appias sabina sabina (western Uganda to Zaire, Nigeria, Sierra Leone)
- Appias sabina comorensis Talbot, 1943 (Comoro Islands)
- Appias sabina confusa (Butler, 1872) (Madagascar)
- Appias sabina udei Suffert, 1904 (northern Kenya (Mount Marsabit) to Malawi and eastern Zimbabwe (Chirinda))
- Appias sabina phoebe (Butler, 1901) (Nairobi)
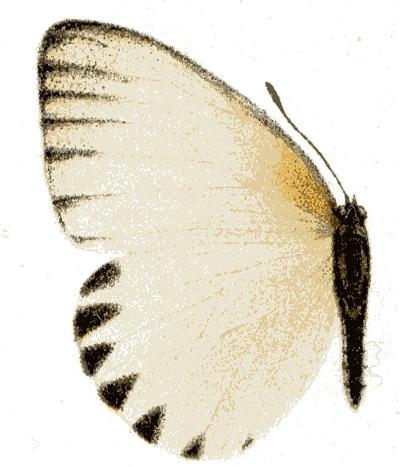
Female

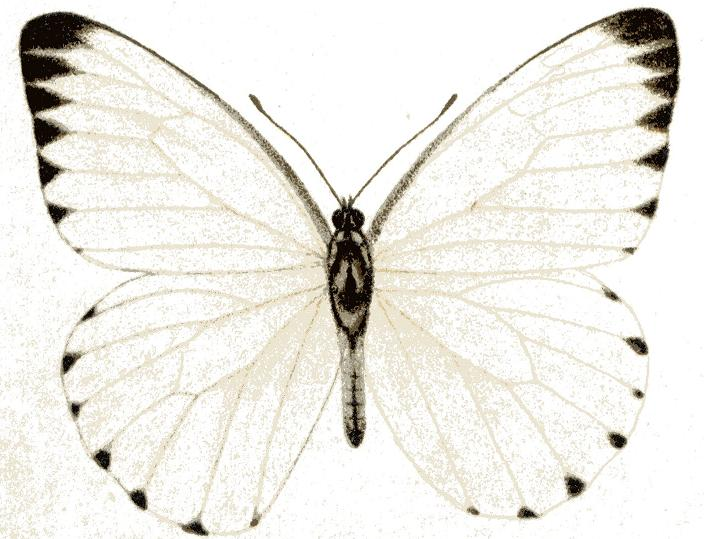
Male
