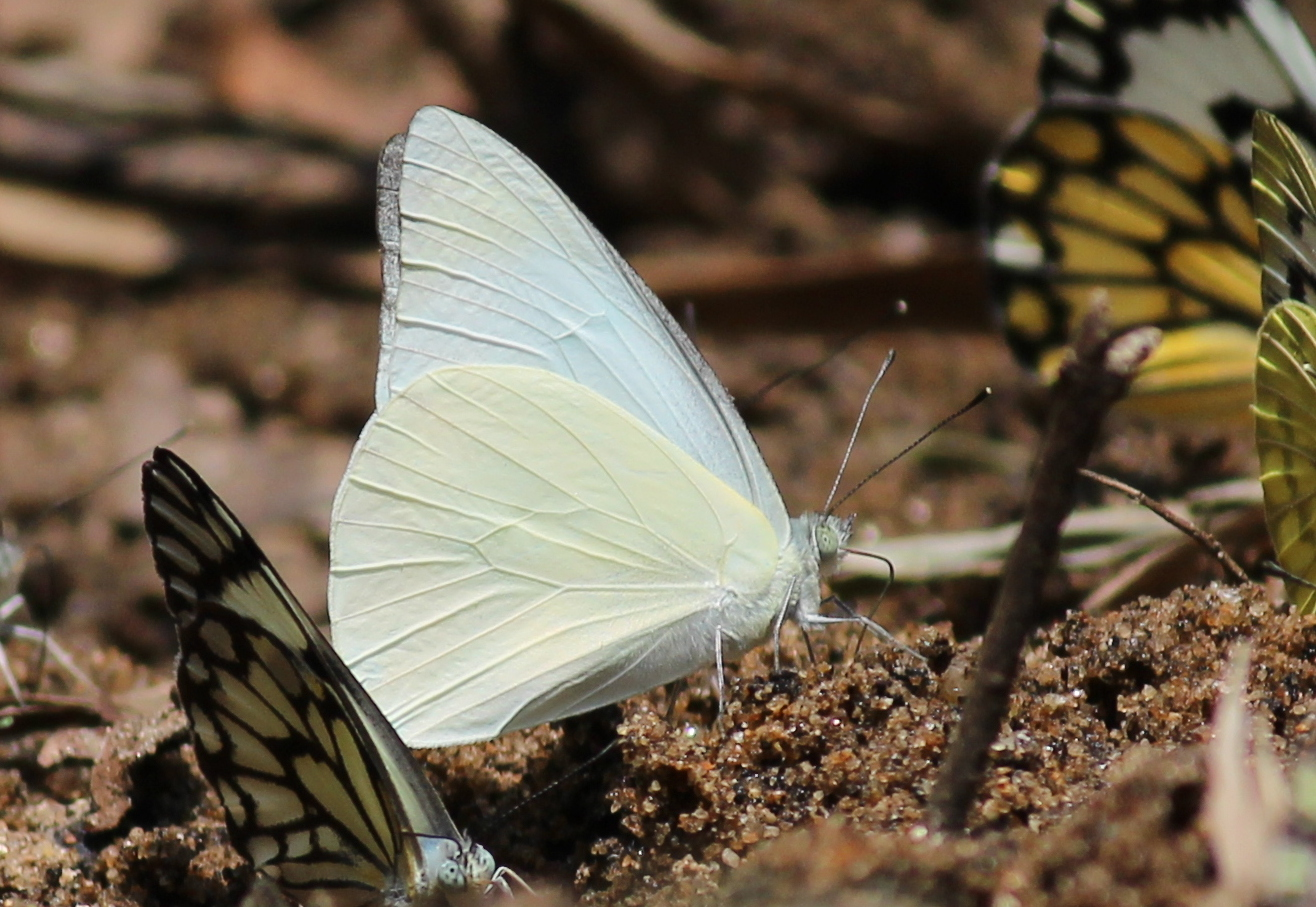
- male
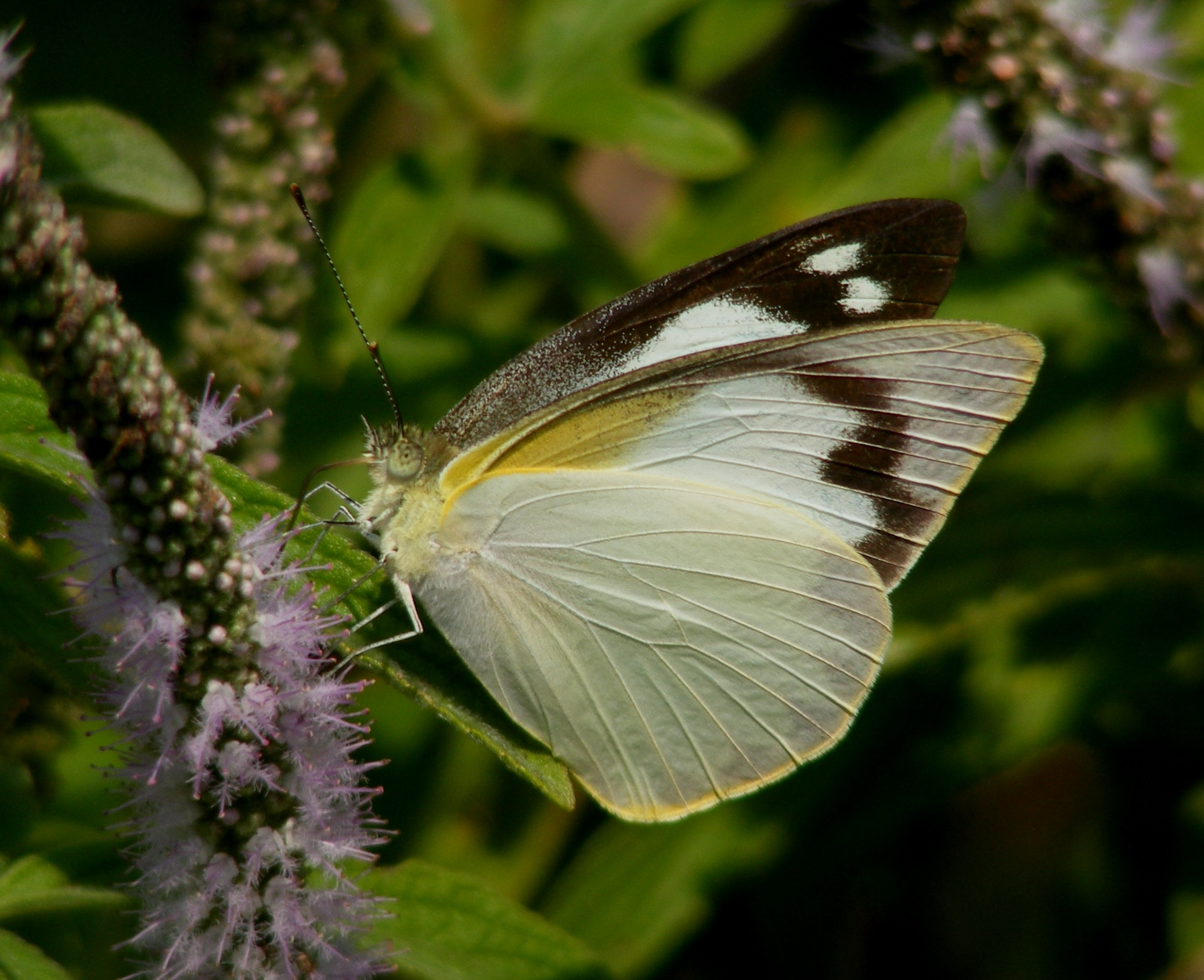
- female

Scientific classification
- Kingdom: Animalia
- Phylum: Arthropoda
- Clade: Pancrustacea
- Class: Insecta
- Order: Lepidoptera
- Family: Pieridae
- Genus: Appias
- Species: A. albina

Binomial name
- Appias albina (Boisduval, 1836)

= Appias albina =

Common albatross

Species of butterfly

Appias albina, the common albatross, is a small butterfly of the family Pieridae. It is found in south and southeast Asia to Australia.

== Description ==
This butterfly closely resembles Appias paulina but the males can be distinguished by the more acutely pointed forewing and the females by the narrower oblique black band on the underside of the forewing. Other differences are given below.

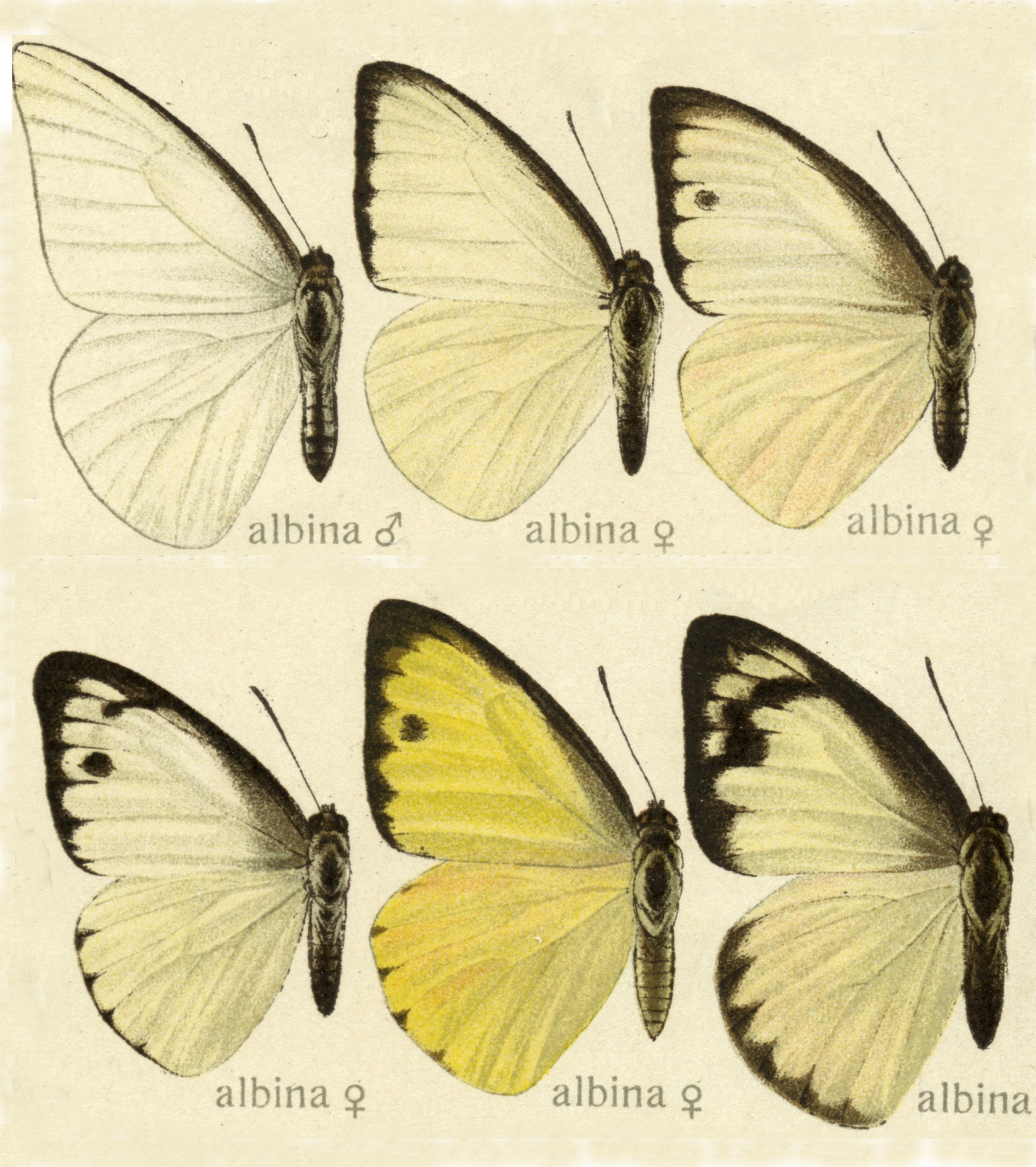

== Variation ==
=== Wet-season form ===
Males have the upper forewings irrorated (sprinkled) with black scales at the apex and anteriorly along the termen, much more sparsely and narrower in general than in A. paulina. On the underside, the apex of the forewing and the whole surface of the hindwing are pale dull ochraceous, sometimes with a faint pinkish tint, but never pale yellow as in A. paulina.

The sexes are dimorphic; the females differ as follows:

1st form: On the upperside, the posterior tornal portion of the black area on the forewing is not inwardly rounded, but straight and generally diffuse. The underside is very like the underside of the dry-season form of A. paulina female. It differs, however, in the narrowness of the oblique curved black band, the outer margin of which is irregularly zigzag, and never evenly curved as in A. paulina.

2nd form: Markings as in the 1st form, but the ground colour on the upperside is entirely pale yellow. On the underside, the apical half of the cell and the disc of the forewing up to the black band are pale sulphur yellow. The oblique curved black band is as in the 1st form and the interspace 1 is whitish. The rest of the forewing and the entire surface of the hindwing are rich chrome yellow.

The antennae, head, thorax and abdomen are much as in A. paulina, but the antennae are dusky black and more closely speckled with white; the underside of the thorax is white in males, never yellow.

=== Dry-season form ===
Upper and undersides: similar to that of the wet-season specimens, but in the male the dusting of black scales on the upperside has almost, in some specimens completely, disappeared, while on the underside the ochraceous colouring is much paler.

In the females both dimorphs differ but little from the dimorphs of the wet-season form, only on the upperside the black on the apical half of the forewing and on the terminal margin of the hindwing is more restricted, while on the underside the oblique curved black band that crosses the forewing is distinctly narrower with a tendency to become diffuse.

The wingspan is 60–74 mm.

It is found in Sikkim up to 4,000 feet (1,200 m), Bengal, western and southern India. Also extending into north-eastern India, Burma and the Malay peninsula.

== Life cycle ==
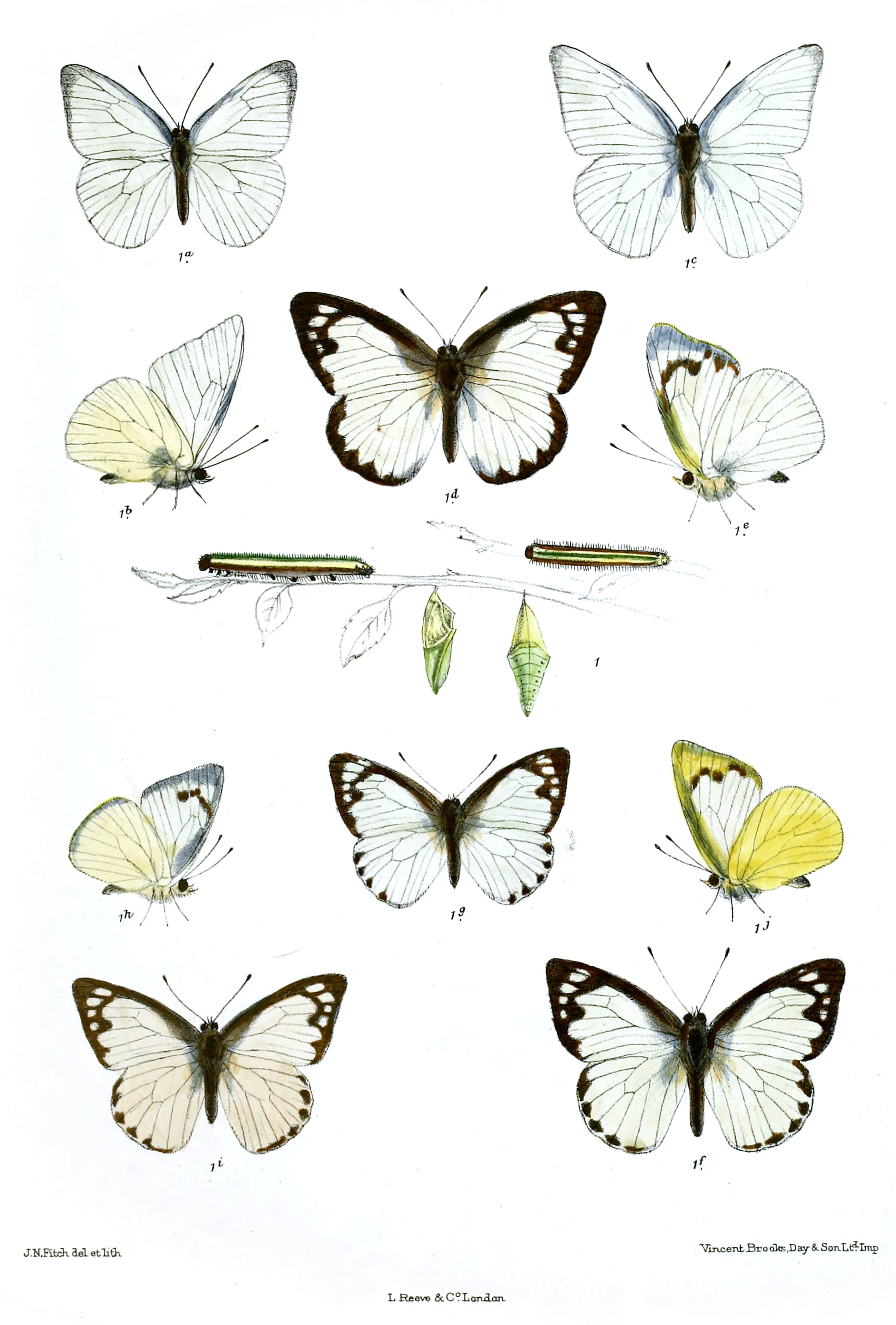
A. a. swinhoei

=== Larva ===
"Light green with a yellow-white spiracular band from segments 2 & 3 to segment 12, where the band expands somewhat. Head round, shining, yellow .... covered with small conical setiferous black tubercles; body rugose, with six transverse rows from above the spiracular region over the dorsum, of small, shining, setiferous, conical black tubercles to each segment; segments 2, 12 and 13 have only a few transverse rows of such tubercles."

=== Pupa ===
"Dirty whitish, with a pink shade on segments 4 to 14. The head-process from between the eyes is long, flattened at the sides, slightly curved, pointed at the extremity .... edges on ventral surface minutely serrated. The front margin of segment 2 is produced into a small subdorsal tooth, and the dorsal line is rather strongly carinated; thorax highly carinated on the dorsal line ...; lateral teeth of segments 6, 7 and 8 are all of the same size and are pointed ...; the head-production, the points on segment 2, the teeth on segments 6 and 7 (sometimes) and the extremity of the cremaster black." (After de Nicéville.)

== Food plants ==
Drypetes oblongifolia, Drypetes roxburghii and Drypetes venusta.

== Gallery ==
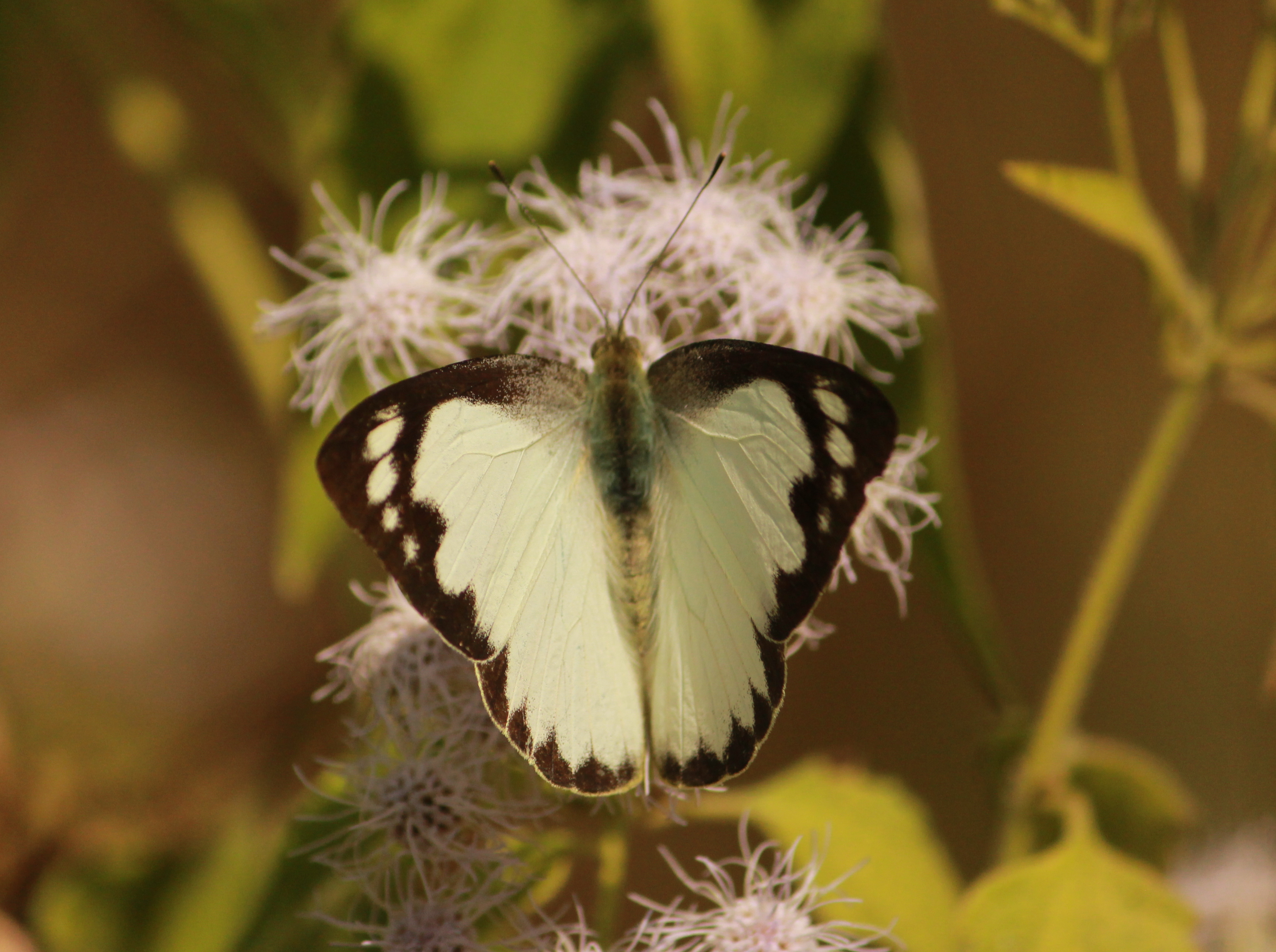
Form flava (female)

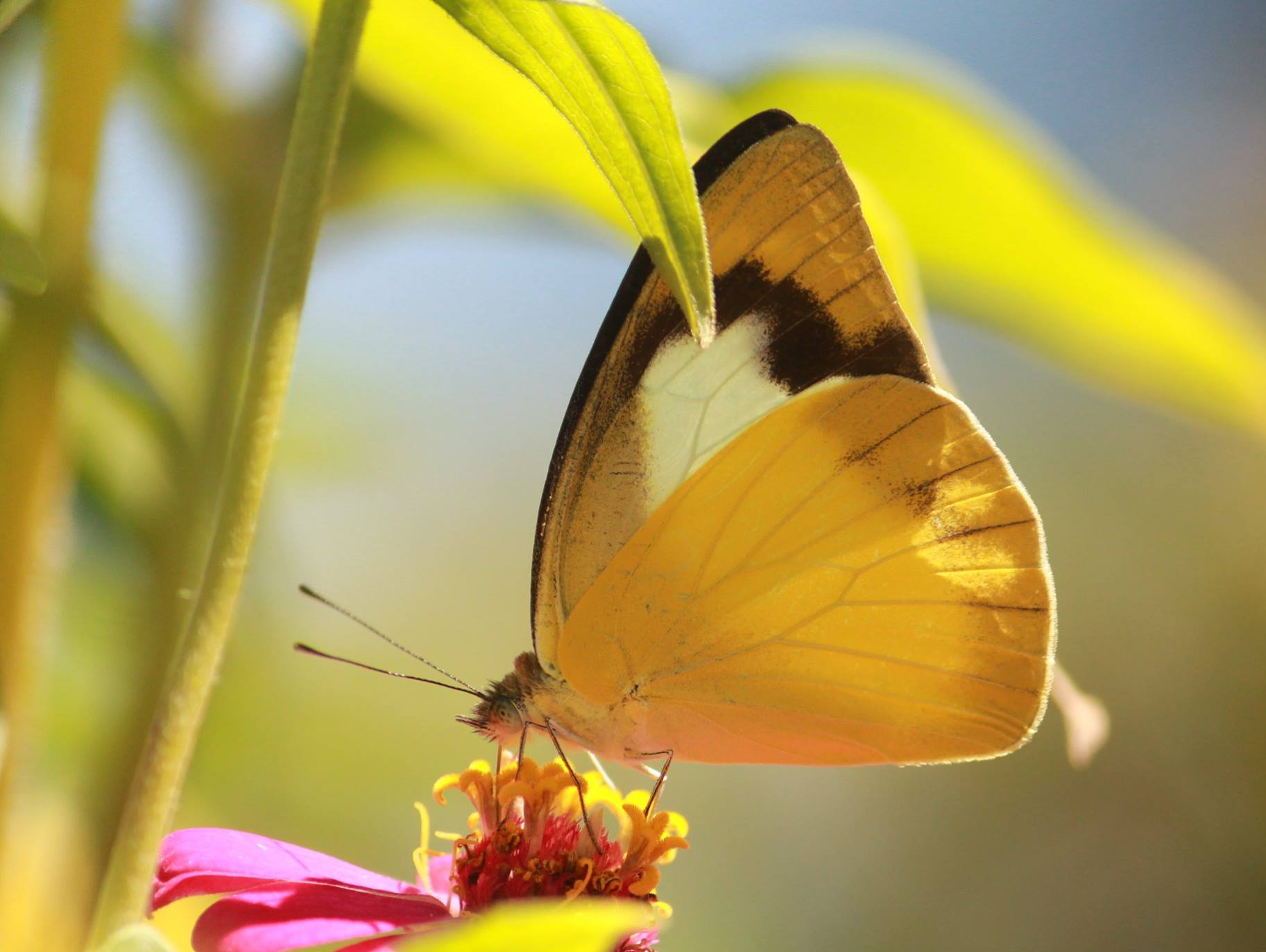
Form semiflava (female)

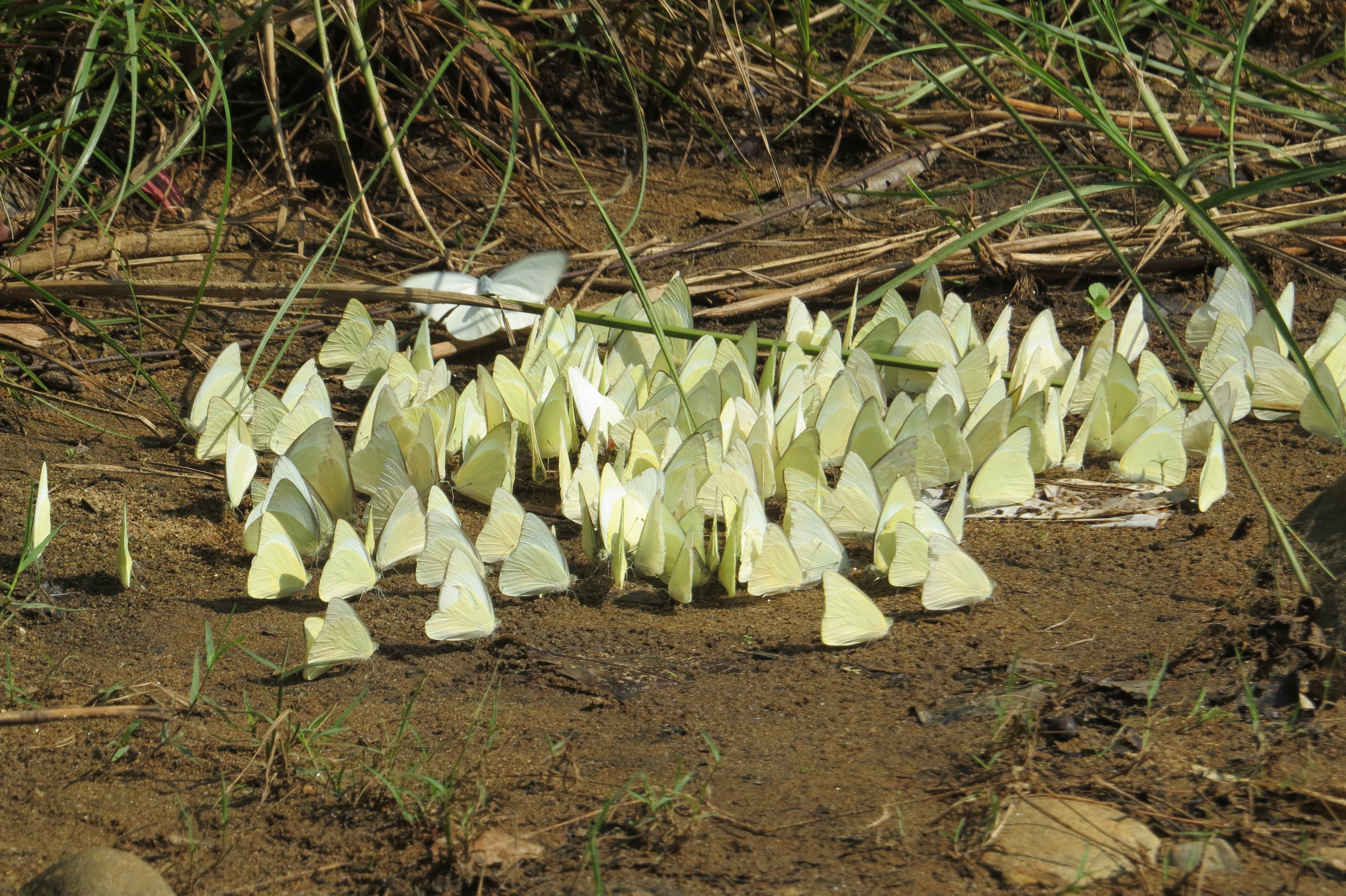
Mud-puddling in Makkootta, Karnataka, India.

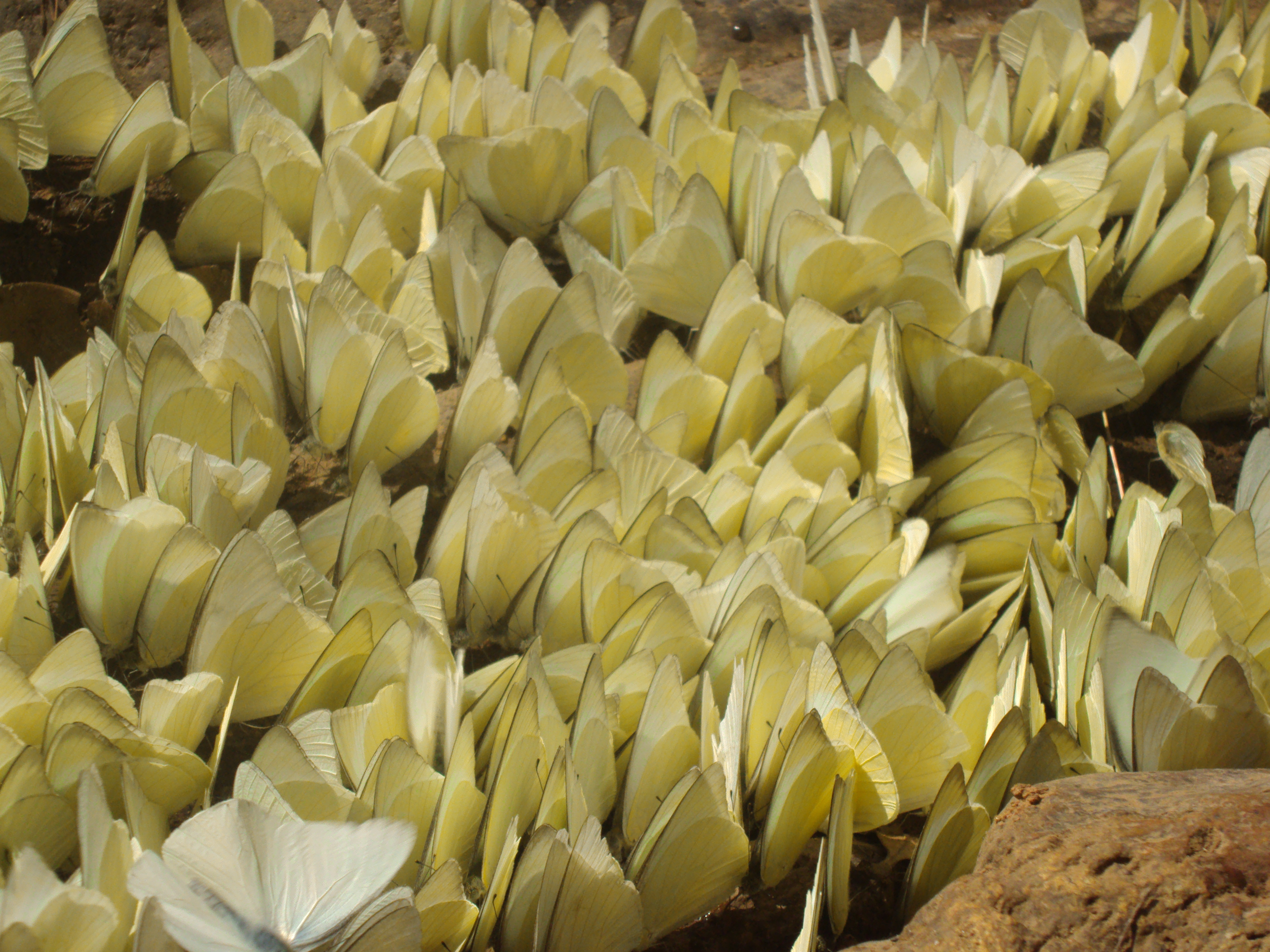
Mud-puddling from the dry stream bed in Aralam Wildlife Sanctuary, Kerala, India.

Mud-puddling in Sri Lanka

== See also ==
- Pieridae
- List of butterflies of India
- List of butterflies of India (Pieridae)
