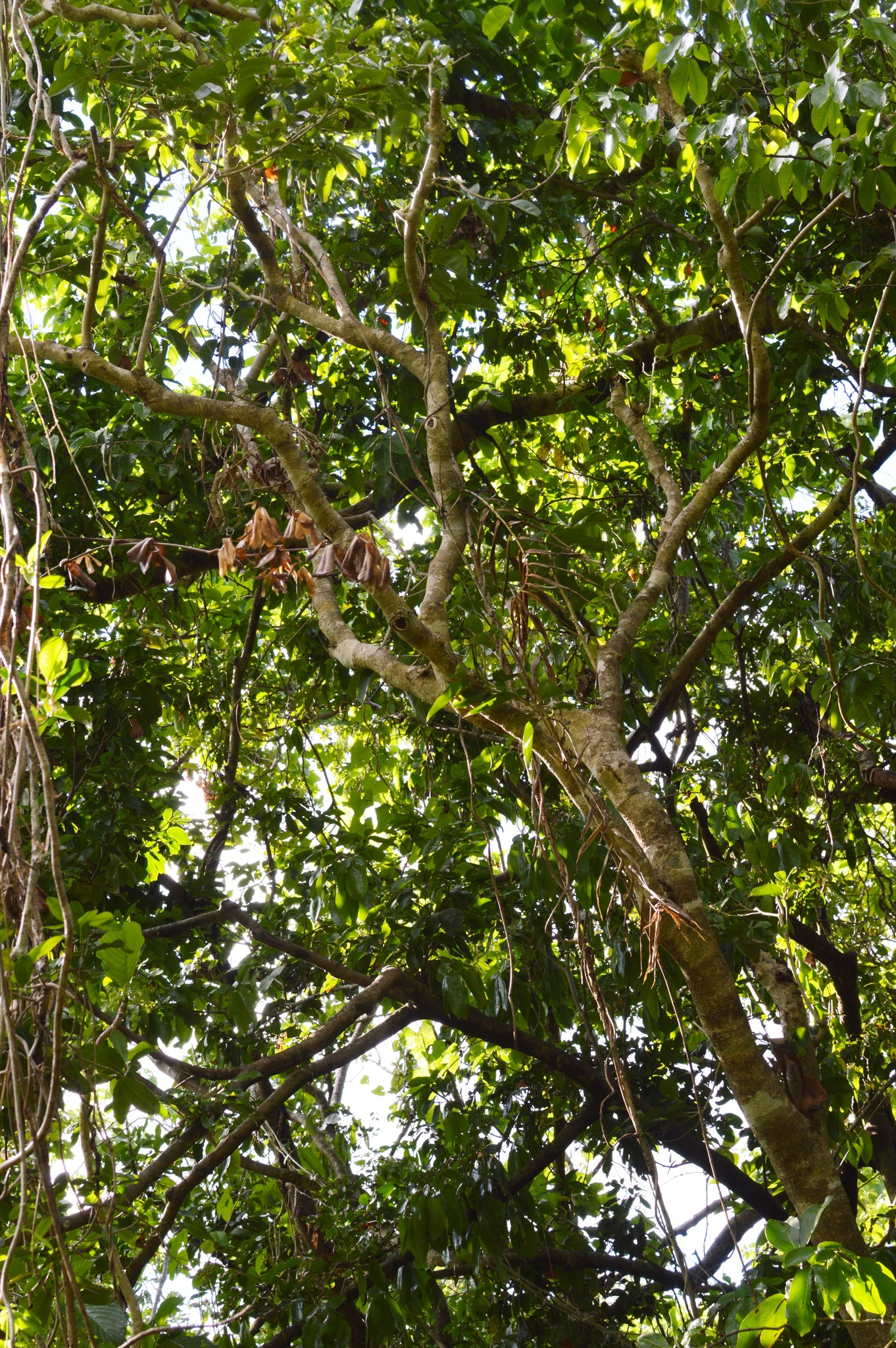
- Mature tree, Saipan, CNMI

Scientific classification
- Kingdom: Plantae
- Clade: Tracheophytes
- Clade: Angiosperms
- Clade: Eudicots
- Clade: Rosids
- Order: Malpighiales
- Family: Putranjivaceae
- Genus: Drypetes
- Species: D. dolichocarpa

Binomial name
- Drypetes dolichocarpa Kaneh. (1934)

Synonyms
- Drypetes rotensis Kaneh. (1934)

= Drypetes dolichocarpa =

Species of flowering plant

Drypetes dolichocarpa (Chamorro: mwelel) is a species of tree in the family Putranjivaceae found in the Mariana Islands.

== See also ==
List of endemic plants in the Mariana Islands

== Gallery ==
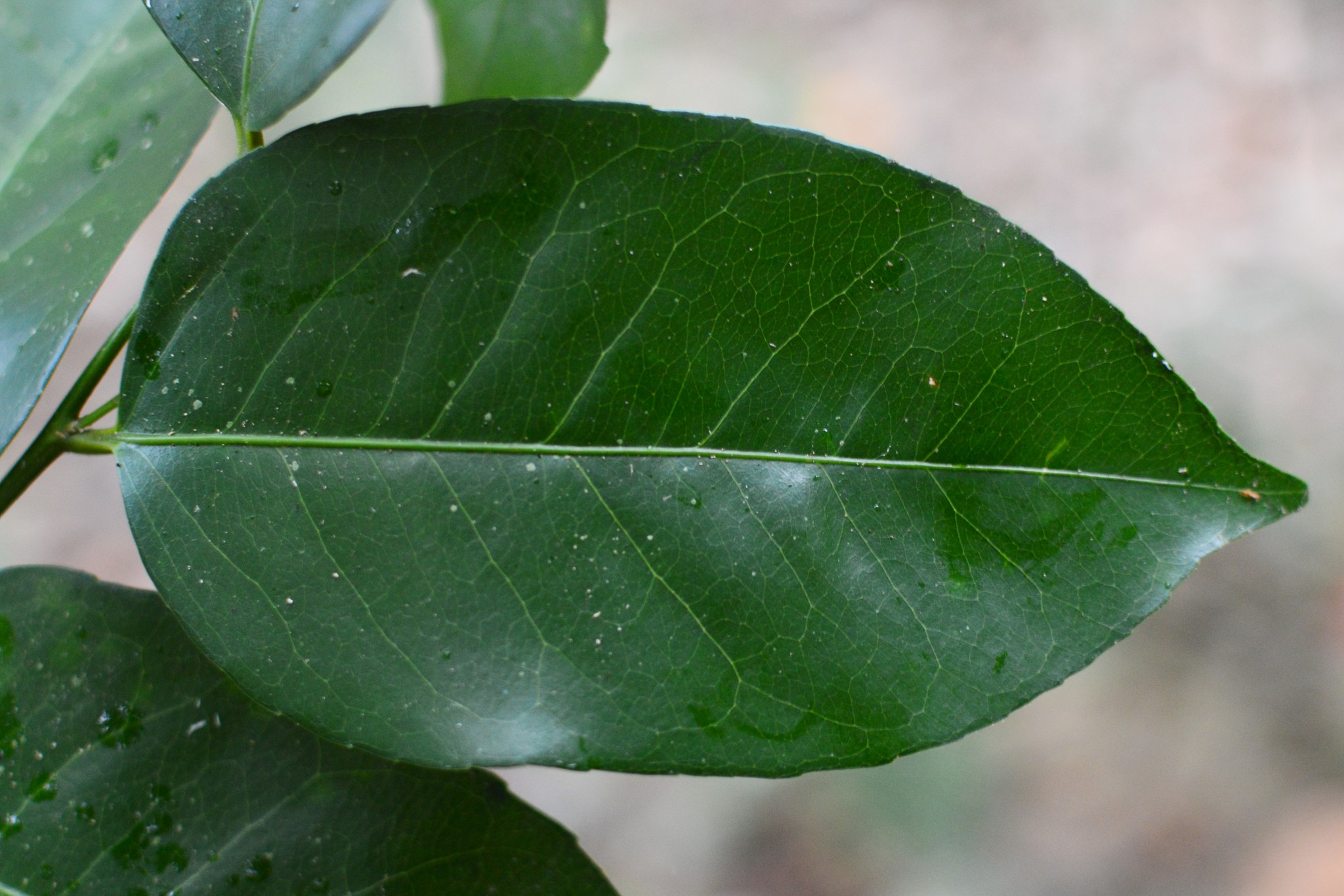
Leaf

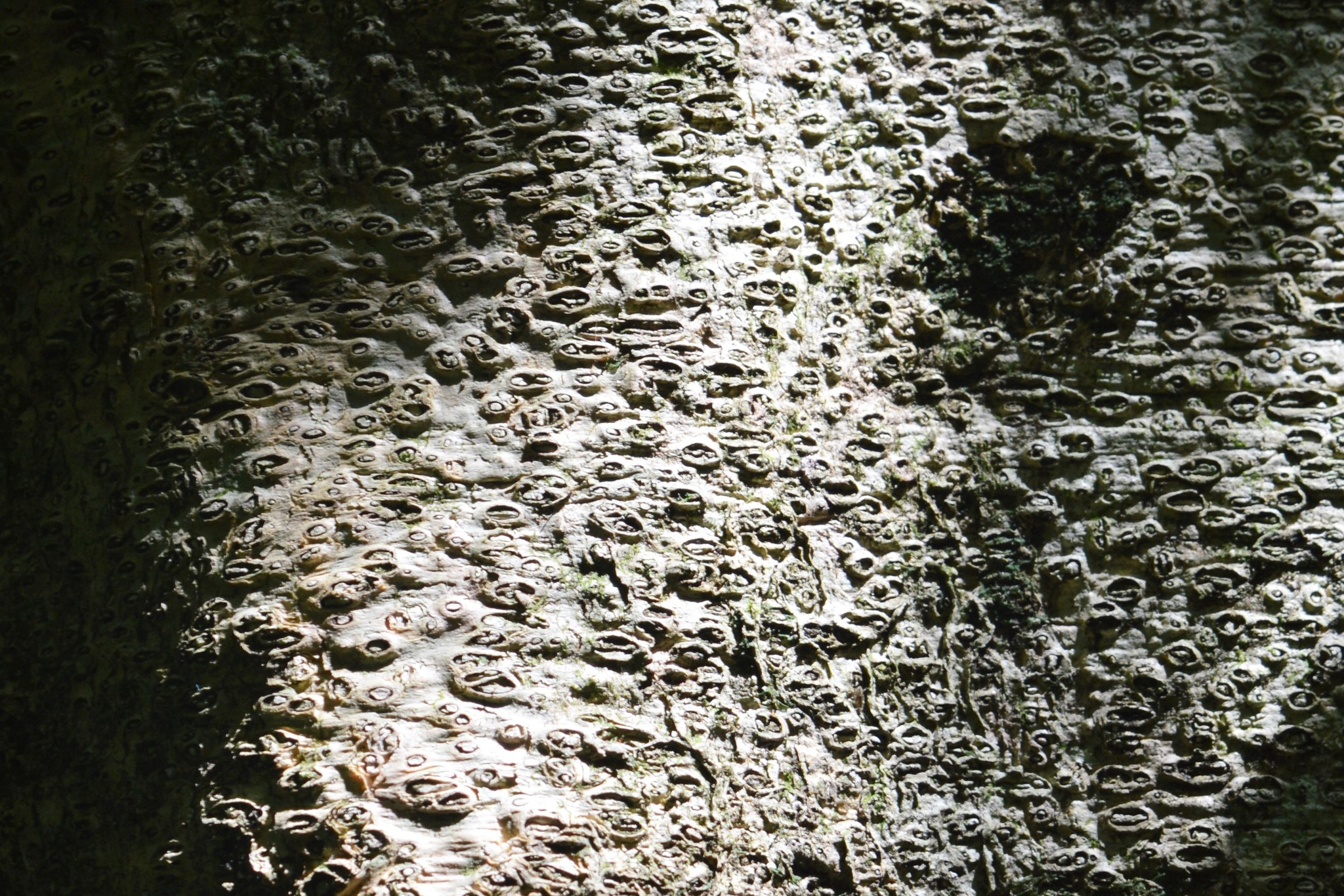
Bark
