= Sibangea pleioneura =

Conservation status
- Endangered (IUCN 3.1)

Scientific classification
- Kingdom: Plantae
- Clade: Tracheophytes
- Clade: Angiosperms
- Clade: Eudicots
- Clade: Rosids
- Order: Malpighiales
- Family: Putranjivaceae
- Genus: Sibangea
- Species: S. pleioneura

Binomial name
- Sibangea pleioneura Radcl.-Sm.

Species of flowering plant

Sibangea pleioneura is a species of plant in the Putranjivaceae family. It is endemic to Tanzania.
