= Drypetes hoaensis =

Conservation status
- Least Concern (IUCN 3.1)

Scientific classification
- Kingdom: Plantae
- Clade: Tracheophytes
- Clade: Angiosperms
- Clade: Eudicots
- Clade: Rosids
- Order: Malpighiales
- Family: Putranjivaceae
- Genus: Drypetes
- Species: D. hoaensis

Binomial name
- Drypetes hoaensis Gagnep., 1924

Synonyms
- Hemicyclia hoaensis Pierre ex Gagnep.

Species of tree

Drypetes hoaensis is an Asian tree species in the family Putranjivaceae.

The recorded occurrence of this species is from Yunnan, Thailand and Vietnam (where it may be called sang trắng Biên Hòa or táo vòng Biên Hòa).
