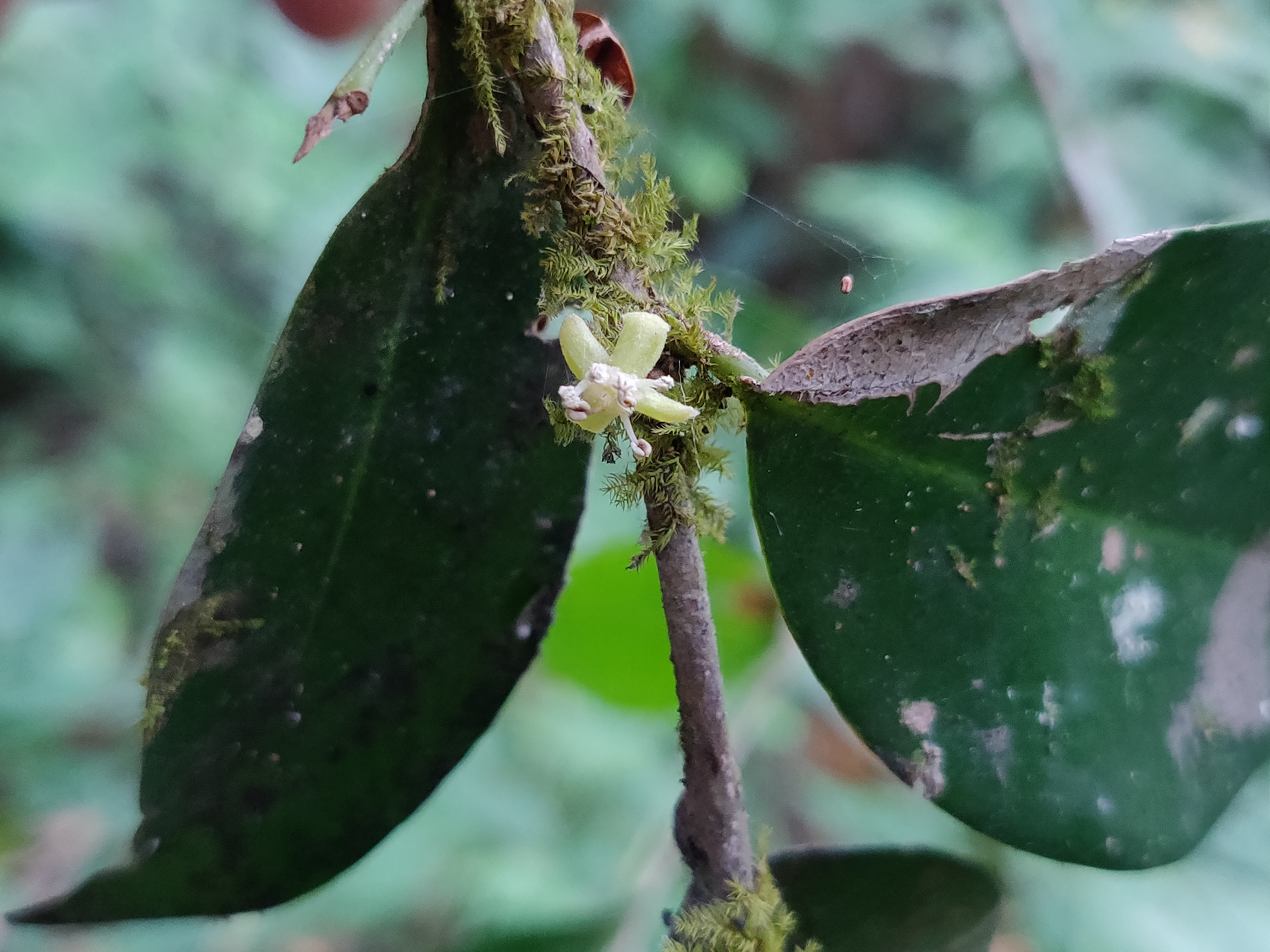

Conservation status
- Vulnerable (IUCN 3.1)

Scientific classification
- Kingdom: Plantae
- Clade: Tracheophytes
- Clade: Angiosperms
- Clade: Eudicots
- Clade: Rosids
- Order: Malpighiales
- Family: Putranjivaceae
- Genus: Drypetes
- Species: D. wightii

Binomial name
- Drypetes wightii (Hook.f.) Pax & K.Hoffm.

Synonyms
- Hemicyclia wightii Hook.f., Fl.

= Drypetes wightii =

Species of tree

Drypetes wightii is an evergreen tree species endemic to the Western Ghats, India. The species is considered Vulnerable under the IUCN Redlist of Threatened Species.

== Description ==
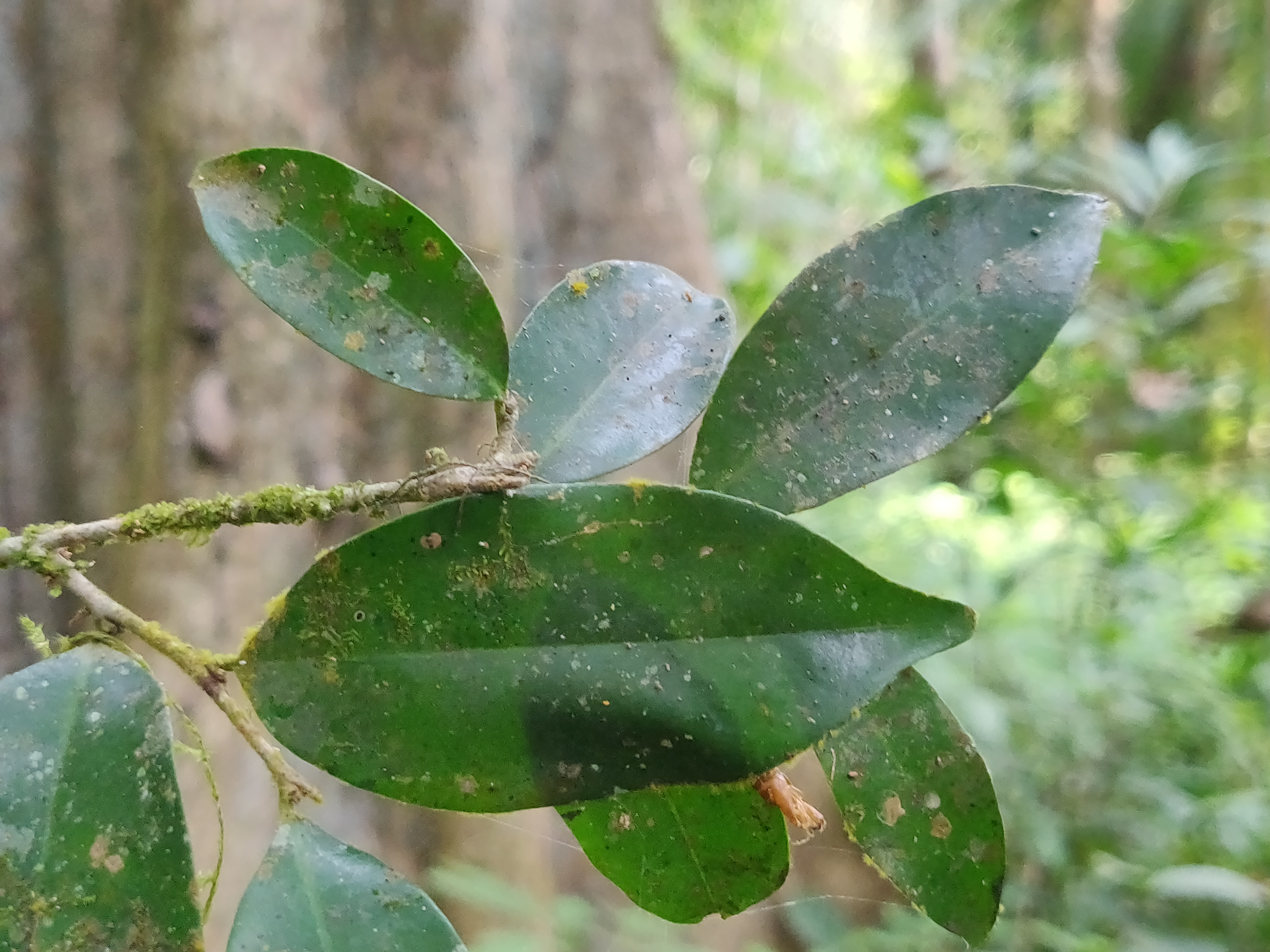
Drypetes wightii twig showing leaf upperside

The species occurs as small trees up to 12 m tall. The bark and trunk appear whitish. The trees have a characteristic horizontal branches, with cylindrical branchlets. Branchlets and leaves lack hairs. The leaves are simple, alternate, and distichous, with short petioles about 0.2 - 0.6 cm long. The leaf blade is sub-coriaceous, about 4-9 cm long by 1.5 to 3.5 cm wide, dark green, drying pale greenish to brown. The shape of the leaves is elliptic with a slight asymmetric base and an acuminate apex. The margin is entire. The leaves have a midrib that is flat above. Leaves have 6-9 pairs of secondary nerves. The flowers are unisexual, with male flowers in axillary clusters from pedicels about 3-5 mm long, puberulous and 4 to 5 tepals about 3 x 2-2.5 mm in size, 6-10 stamens that are about 1-1.5 mm long. The stamen filaments are free, with oblong anthers. The female flowers are also axillary, but solitary, with pedicels 4-5 mm long, puberulous and 4-5 tepals about 3-4 × 2.5-3.5 mm in size; disc annular and reniform stigma. The ovary is about 2 x 1 mm, ellipsoid and with a single locule with two ovules, sparsely puberulous to glabrous. The fruit is a drupe, ovoid to ellipsoid in shape, about 1.7-2 cm long by 1.5 cm wide, smooth and hair-less, with a pedicel about 10-12 mm long and holding a single seed.

== Range ==
The species occurs in the Western Ghats mountains in the states of Tamil Nadu and Kerala from Wynaad and the Nilgiris in the North to the Anamalai Hills. It occurs between 900 and 1500 m.

== Habitat ==
The trees occur in mid-elevation (900 to 1500 m) tropical wet evergreen forests of the Western Ghats.

== Ecology ==
The species is considered rare and is found in the understorey of taller trees. It has been reported to occur at a density of 6 to 24 stems per hectare in tropical wet evergreen forests in different locations.

== Etymology ==
The specific epithet derives from Robert Wight, whom the species is named for. In Malayalam, the species is called vellakasavu.
