= Drypetes ellisii =

Scientific classification
- Kingdom: Plantae
- Clade: Tracheophytes
- Clade: Angiosperms
- Clade: Eudicots
- Clade: Rosids
- Order: Malpighiales
- Family: Putranjivaceae
- Genus: Drypetes
- Species: D. ellisii

Binomial name
- Drypetes ellisii S.P.Mathew & Chakrab.

Species of flowering plant

Drypetes ellisii is a lesser known endemic tree in the family Putranjivaceae described from the Andaman Islands in the Bay of Bengal. The type locality of this species is Mount Harriet National Park. This taxon is rather rare. It grows up to 10 m in height.
