= Drypetes thorelii =

Scientific classification
- Kingdom: Plantae
- Clade: Tracheophytes
- Clade: Angiosperms
- Clade: Eudicots
- Clade: Rosids
- Order: Malpighiales
- Family: Putranjivaceae
- Genus: Drypetes
- Species: D. thorelii

Binomial name
- Drypetes thorelii Gagnep., 1924

Species of tree

Drypetes thorelii is an Asian tree species in the family Putranjivaceae; it is named after the French botanist Clovis Thorel.

The recorded occurrence of this species is from Cambodia and Vietnam (where it may be called sang trắng Thorel).
