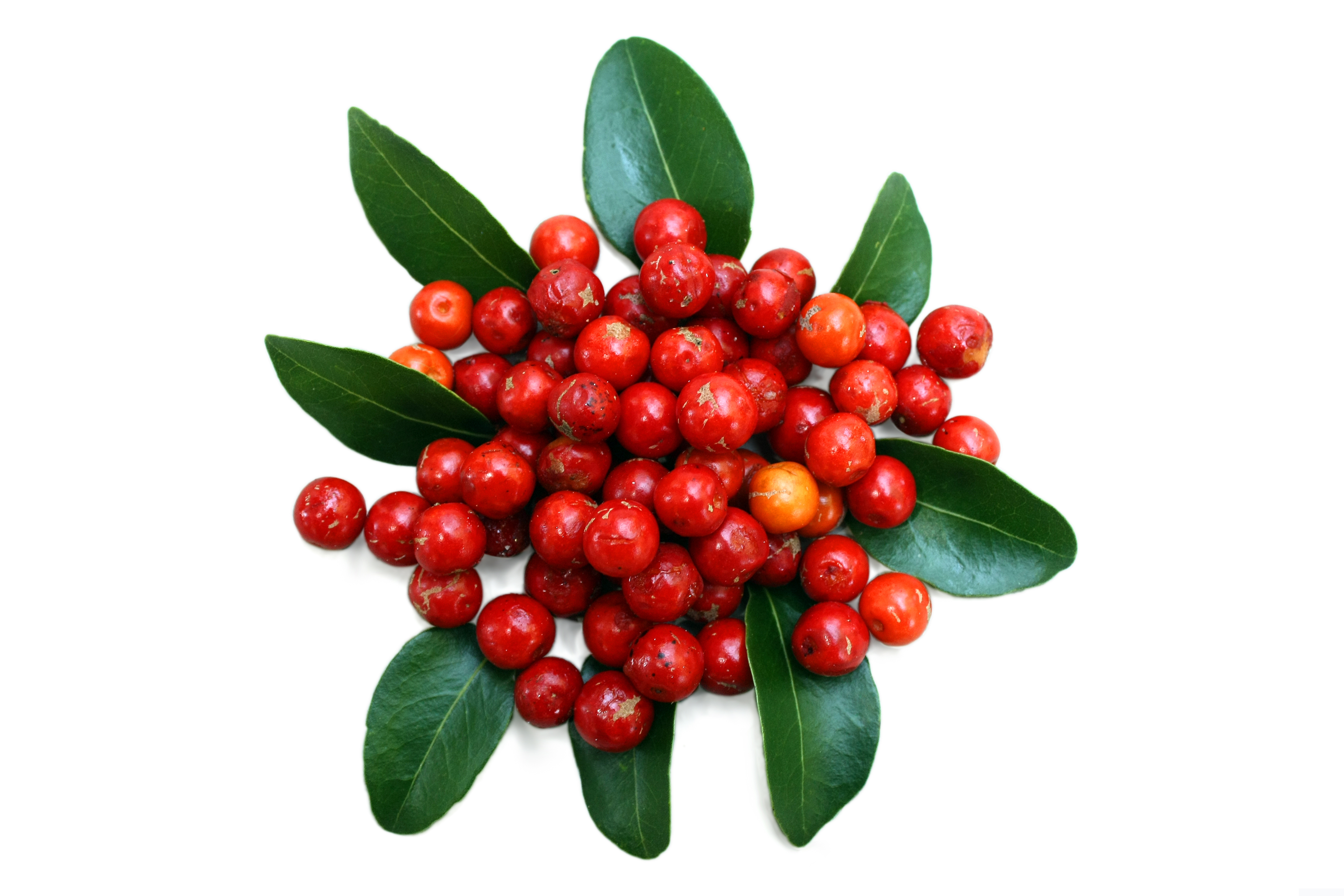
- Fruits and leaves

Scientific classification
- Kingdom: Plantae
- Clade: Tracheophytes
- Clade: Angiosperms
- Clade: Eudicots
- Clade: Rosids
- Order: Malpighiales
- Family: Putranjivaceae
- Genus: Drypetes
- Species: D. sepiaria

Binomial name
- Drypetes sepiaria (Wight & Arn.) Pax & K.Hoffm.

Synonyms
- Hemicyclia sepiaria Wight & Arn. Hemicyclia sepiaria var. australasica Baill. Hemicyclia sepiaria var. oblongifolia Benth.

= Drypetes sepiaria =

Species of tree

Drypetes sepiaria is a species of small tree in the family Putranjivaceae. This tree is very common in India and Sri Lanka. It is known by many local names, including vellakasavu, veeramaram in Malayalam, vellilambu, veerai (வீரை), aadumilukkan, kaayalakkamaram in Tamil, and weera (වීර) in Sinhala.

== Description ==
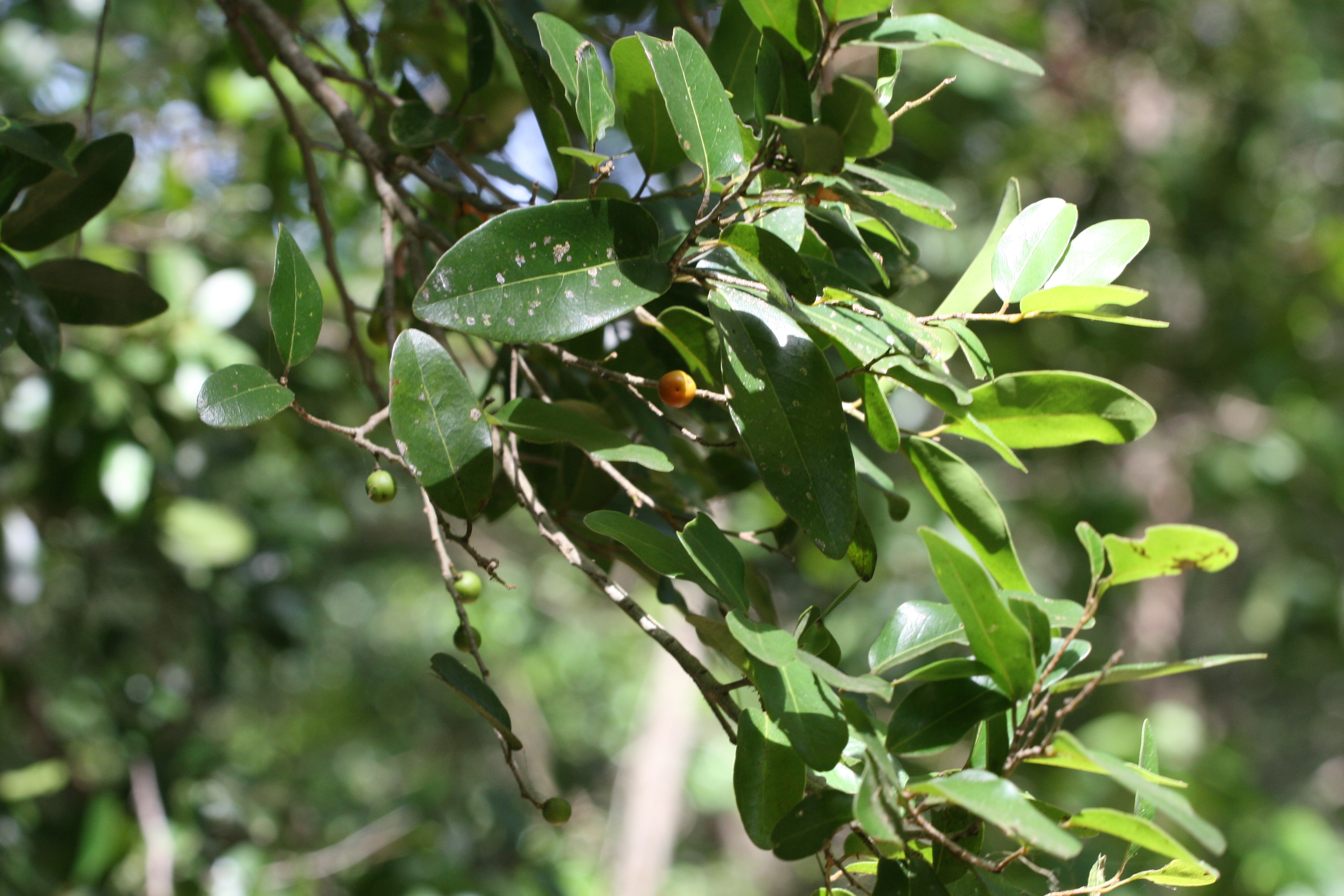
Leaves

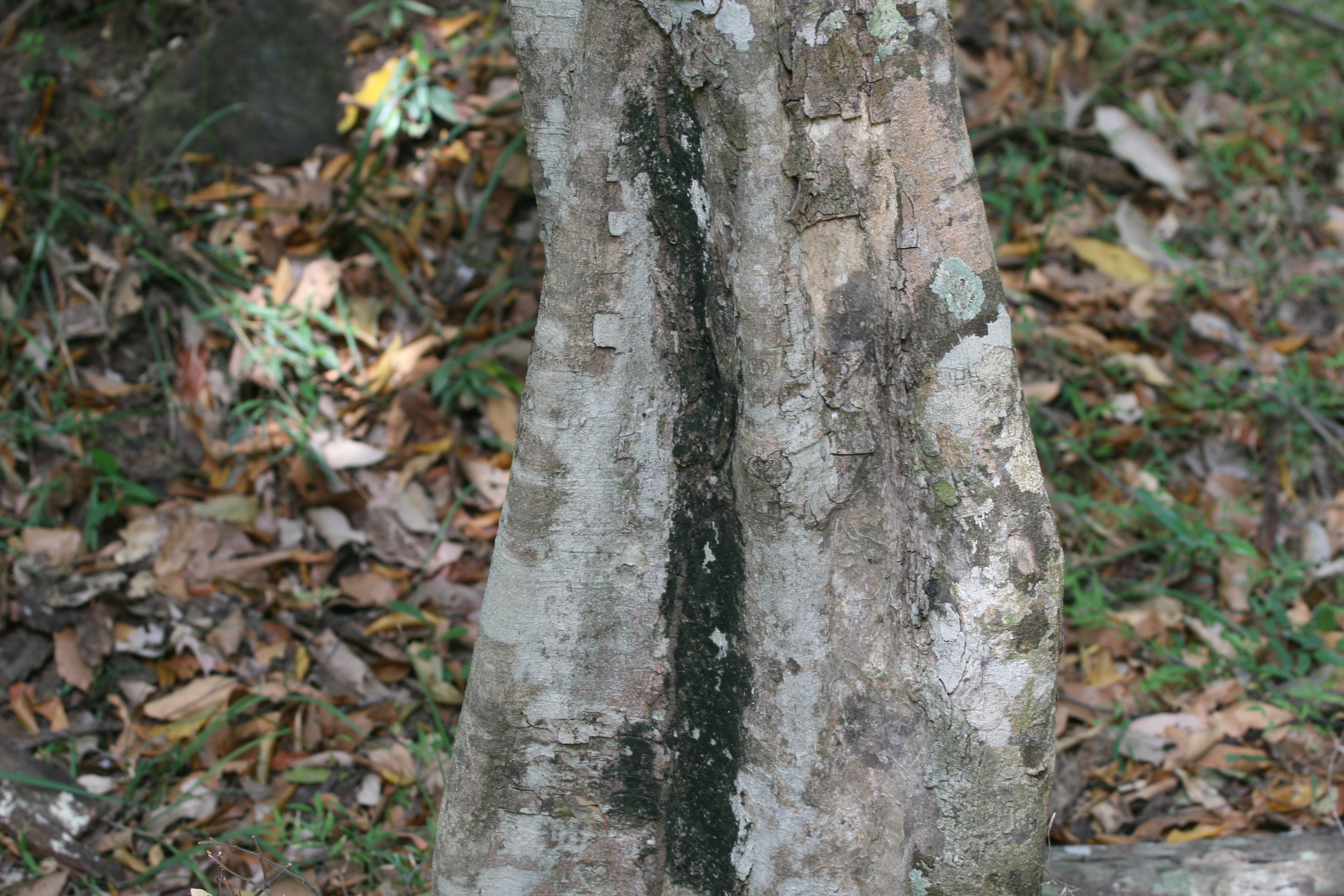
Stem

The inflorescence flowers are bracteolate, axillary clusters or short racemes. The fruits are crimson in color, small sphere in shape and fusiform drupe. The mature leaves are broadly oval-oblong and base cordate to rounded in shape and glossy on the upper side. The young leaves are light green in color, turning dark green as they mature. The trunk are often gnarled, twisted or flutes, rigid, much-branched and puberulous.

It grows in monsoon forest and scrub lands.

== Uses ==
The tree has edible tropical fruit. Its trunk uses in fence and other mature branch and fence use as firewood.
