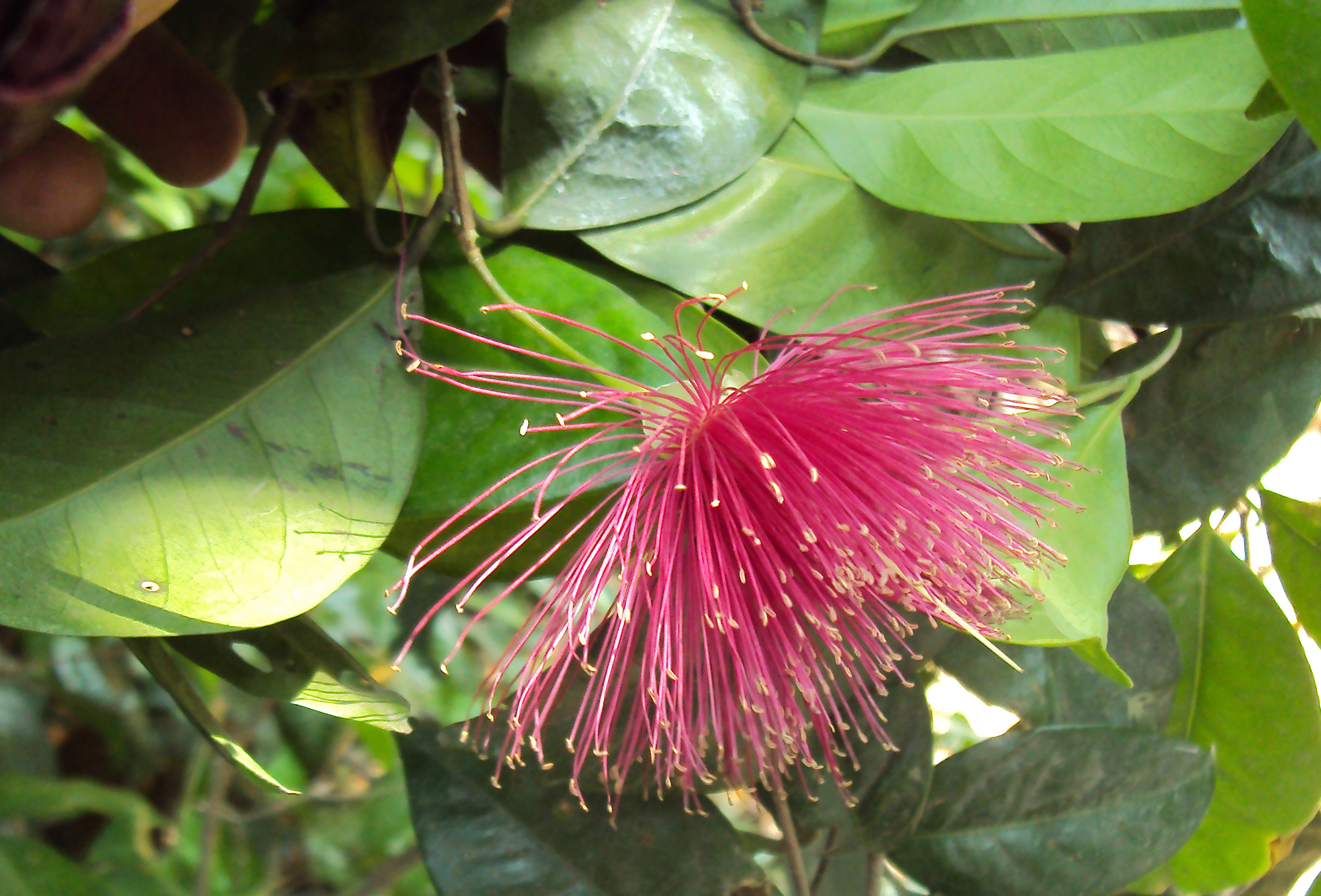

Conservation status
- Least Concern (IUCN 3.1)

Scientific classification
- Kingdom: Plantae
- Clade: Tracheophytes
- Clade: Angiosperms
- Clade: Eudicots
- Clade: Rosids
- Order: Myrtales
- Family: Myrtaceae
- Genus: Syzygium
- Species: S. laetum

Binomial name
- Syzygium laetum (Buch.-Ham.) Gandhi

Synonyms
- Clavimyrtus pauciflora (Walp.) Blume; Eugenia bauanguica Blanco; Eugenia laeta Buch.-Ham.; Eugenia laeta var. pauciflora (Walp.) Duthie; Eugenia pauciflora Wight, nom. illeg. homonym. post.; Eugenia wightii Bedd.; Jambosa laeta (Buch.-Ham.) Blume; Jambosa pauciflora Walp.; Syzygium laetum var. pauciflorum (Walp.) M.R.Almeida

= Syzygium laetum =

Species of flowering plant

Syzygium laetum , commonly known as manjachamba, is a species of flowering plant in the family Myrtaceae. It is a shrub or tree endemic to the Western Ghats of Karnataka, Kerala, Maharashtra, and Tamil Nadu states in western India. It is a small evergreen understory tree, with typically myrtaceous yellow or sometimes reddish flowers.

== Habitat ==
Syzygium laetum grows in tropical evergreen lowland and lower montane rain forests on the western slope of the Western Ghats from 100 to 1,200 metres elevation. It is commonly associated with the canopy trees Vateria indica, Dipterocarpus indicus, Mesua ferrea, Palaquium ellipticum, and Cullenia exarillata, and the understory trees Litsea floribunda, L. stocksii, Meiogyne pannosa, Otonephelium stipulaceum, and Drypetes venusta.

== Uses ==
Syzygium laetum is utilized for various purposes, including timber, traditional medicine, and ornamental planting. The wood is moderately hard and durable, suitable for construction, furniture making, and agricultural implements. In traditional medicine, the leaves and bark are used in the treatment of fever, diarrhea, and skin infections. The fruits are edible and occasionally consumed locally. The species is also planted as a shade and ornamental tree, and it plays a role in soil stabilization and maintaining ecological balance in riparian and evergreen forest areas.
