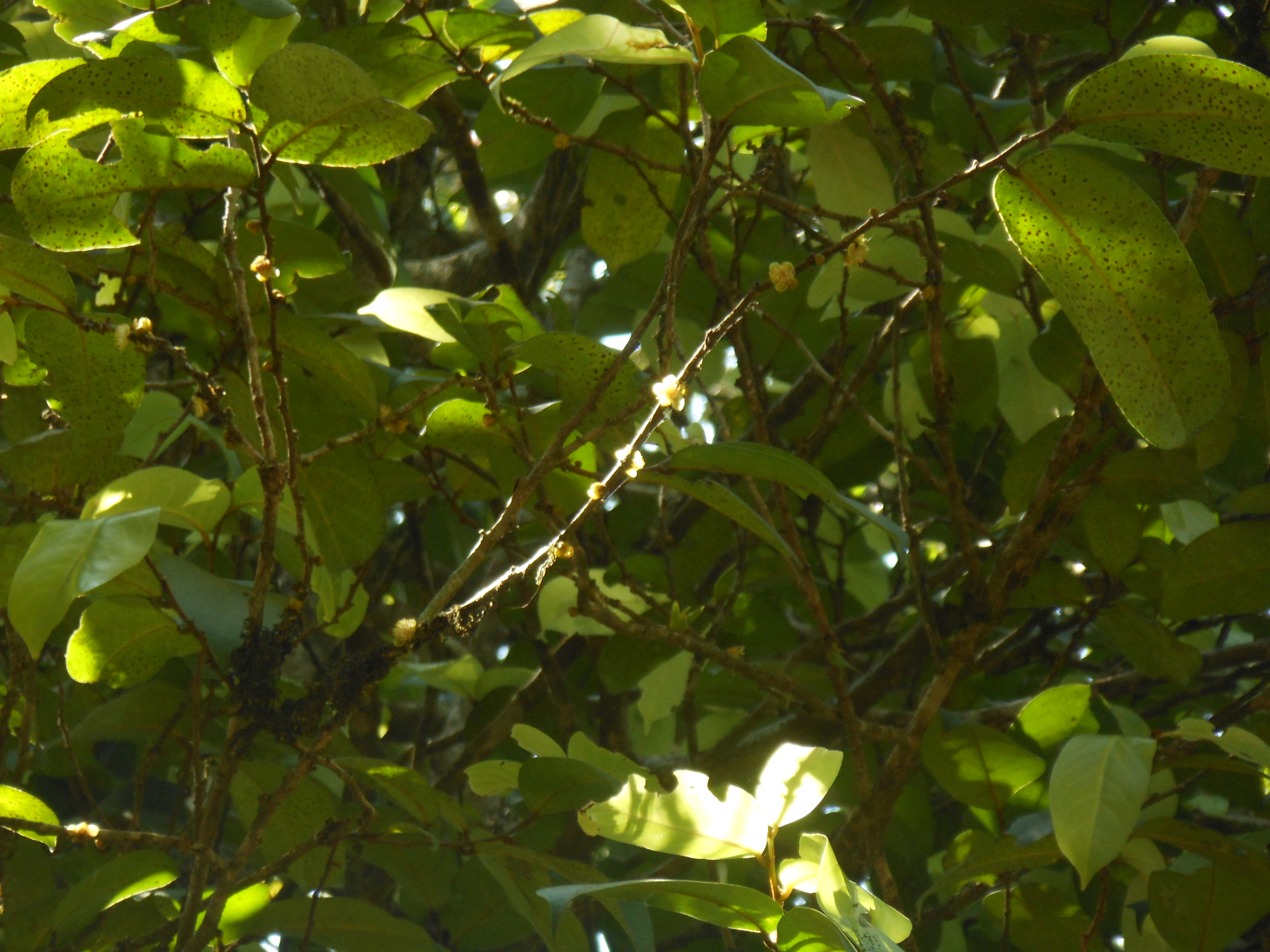

Scientific classification
- Kingdom: Plantae
- Clade: Tracheophytes
- Clade: Angiosperms
- Clade: Eudicots
- Clade: Rosids
- Order: Malpighiales
- Family: Putranjivaceae
- Genus: Drypetes
- Species: D. oblongifolia

Binomial name
- Drypetes oblongifolia Bedd.

= Drypetes oblongifolia =

Species of flowering plant

Drypetes oblongifolia is a plant species of the genus Drypetes and the family Putranjivaceae.

It is found in the shola forest of Kerala, a state in India.

It is a host for larvae of the butterfly species Appias albina and Appias india.
