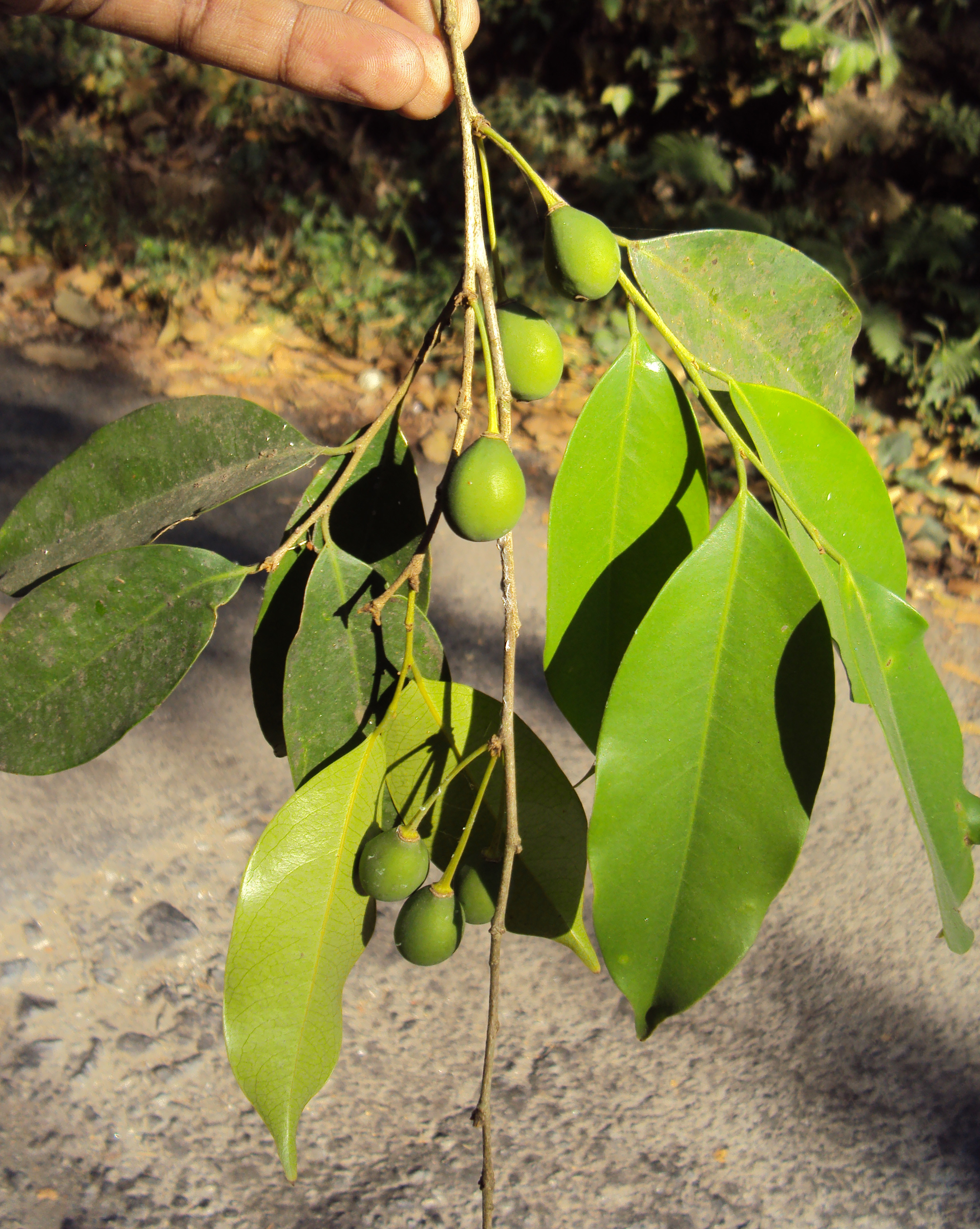

Scientific classification
- Kingdom: Plantae
- Clade: Tracheophytes
- Clade: Angiosperms
- Clade: Eudicots
- Clade: Rosids
- Order: Malpighiales
- Family: Putranjivaceae
- Genus: Drypetes
- Species: D. venusta

Binomial name
- Drypetes venusta (Wight) Pax & K.Hoffm.

Synonyms
- Astylis venusta Wight; Hemicyclia venusta (Wight) Thwaites; Drypetes elata (Bedd.) Pax & K.Hoffm.; Hemicyclia elata Bedd.

= Drypetes venusta =

Species of flowering plant

Drypetes venusta is an evergreen tree species endemic to the Western Ghats, India. They are large trees with smooth, straight, and white trunk and horizontal branches. It can reach a height up to 35 m, and a girth up to 3 m.

== Description ==
The leaves are simple with alternate phyllotaxy and elliptic or elliptic oblong shape. Leaf size is about 5-12 × 2-5 cm. Leaf base is oblique, and apex is acute or shortly acuminate. There will be 8-12 pairs secondary nerves. The petiole length is 0.4-1 cm. Flowers are dioecious, and greenish yellow in colour. The male flowers are seen in axillary clusters with pedicel length of 1-1.5 cm. The female flowers are axillary, seen either solitary or in pairs, with pedicel length up to 6 cm. Fruit are ellipsoid or obovoid, green in colour, and drooping.

== Distribution ==
This is a common tree in low and medium elevation evergreen forests of Western Ghats from Lonavala to Thiruvananthapuram. The altitudinal range is from 200 m to 1200 m.
