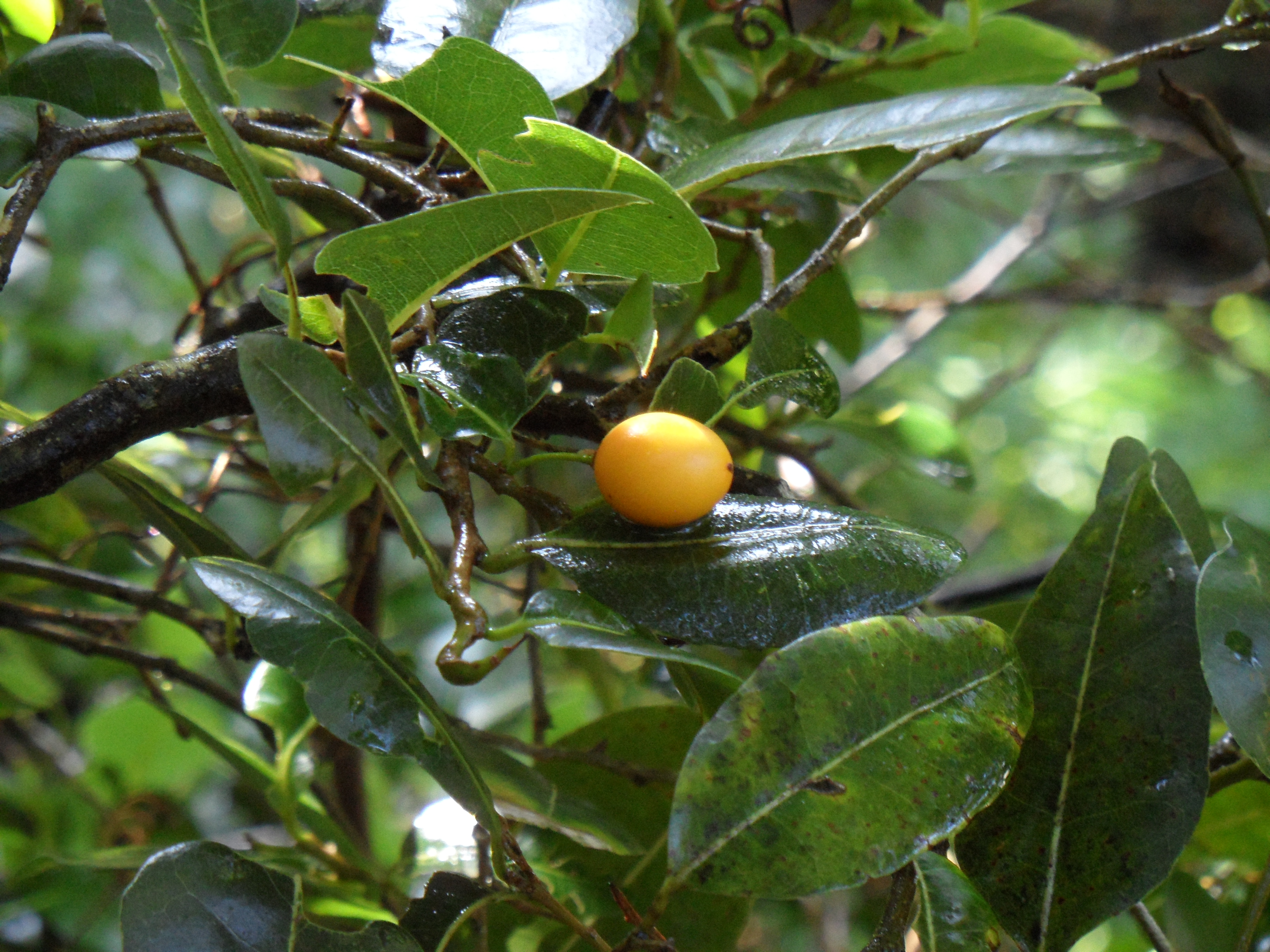
- Drypetes deplanchei
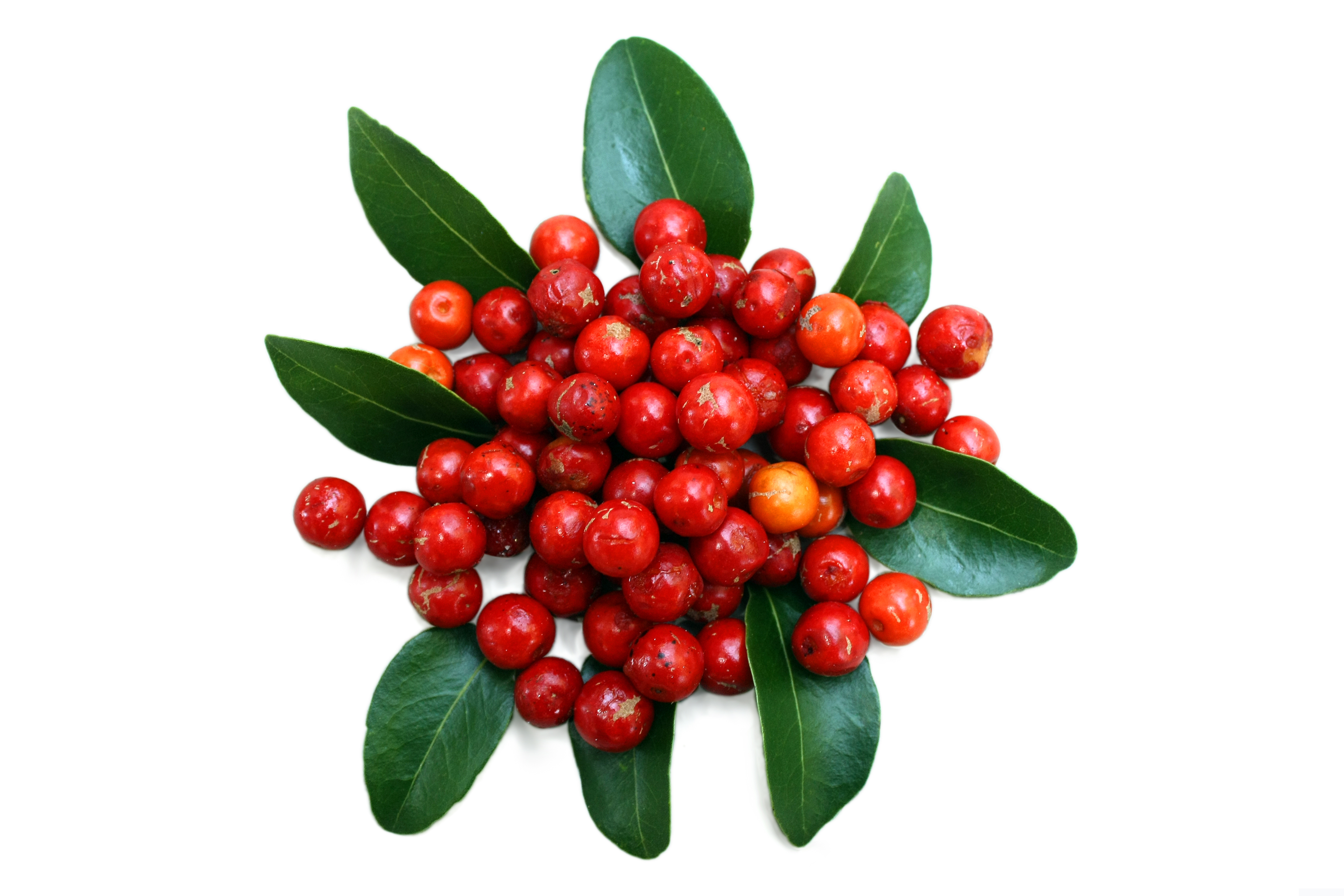
- Fruits of Drypetes sepiaria with leaves

Scientific classification
- Kingdom: Plantae
- Clade: Tracheophytes
- Clade: Angiosperms
- Clade: Eudicots
- Clade: Rosids
- Order: Malpighiales
- Family: Putranjivaceae
- Genus: Drypetes; Vahl

Synonyms
- Anaua Miq.; Astylis Wight; Brexiopsis H.Perrier; Calyptosepalum S.Moore; Cyclostemon Blume; Discophis Raf.; Dodecastemon Hassk.; Freireodendron Müll.Arg.; Guya Frapp. ex Cordem.; Hemicyclia Wight & Arn.; Humblotia Baill.; Laneasagum Bedd.; Liparena Poit. ex Leman; Liparene Baill.; Palenga Thwaites; Paracasearia Boerl.; Periplexis Wall.; Pycnosandra Blume; Riseleya Hemsl.; Sphragidia Thwaites; Stelechanteria Thouars ex Baill.

= Drypetes =

Genus of flowering plants

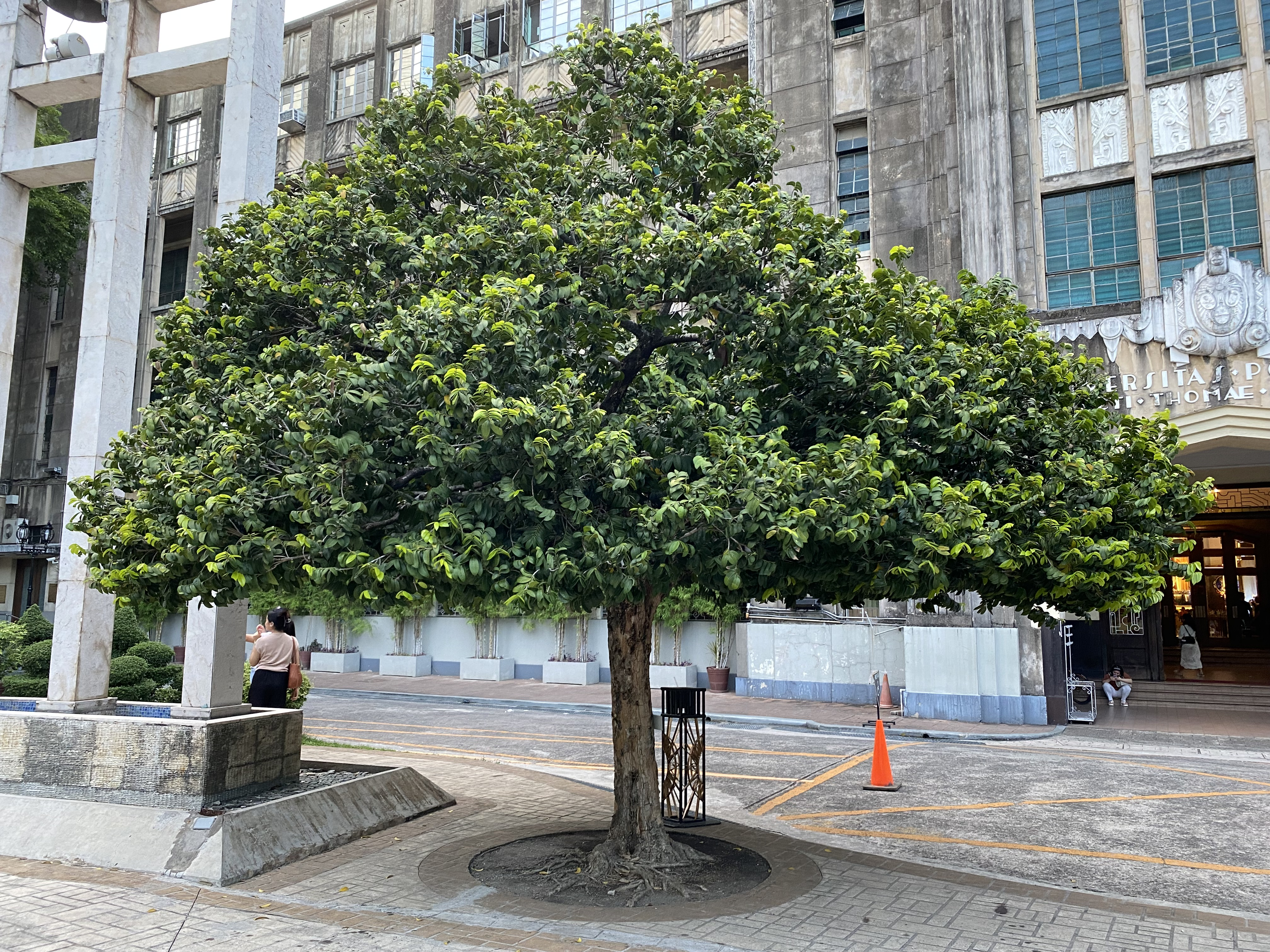
Drypetes falcata

Drypetes is a plant genus of the family Putranjivaceae, in the order Malpighiales.

It was previously in the family Euphorbiaceae, tribe Drypeteae, and was the sole pantropical zoochorous genus of the family.

The genus comprises about 200 species, found in Africa, southern Asia, Australia, Central America, the Caribbean, southern Florida, Mexico, and various oceanic islands. They are dioecious trees or shrubs.

Along with Putranjiva, also in the Putranjivaceae, Drypetes contains the only plants outside the Brassicales known to contain mustard oils.

== Species ==
The Kew World Checklist of Selected Plant Families (WCSP) lists:

1. Drypetes acuminata – Queensland
2. Drypetes aetoxyloides – Sabah
3. Drypetes aframensis – W Africa
4. Drypetes afzelii – W Africa
5. Drypetes alba – West Indies
6. Drypetes amazonica – Ecuador, NW Brazil
7. Drypetes ambigua – Madagascar
8. Drypetes andamanica – Myanmar, Andaman Is
9. Drypetes angustifolia – Central Africa
10. Drypetes arcuatinervia – China, Vietnam
11. Drypetes arguta – E + S Africa
12. Drypetes assamica – E Himalayas, N Indochina
13. Drypetes aubrevillei – W Africa
14. Drypetes australis – KwaZulu-Natal
15. Drypetes aylmeri – W Africa
16. Drypetes bakembei – Central African Republic
17. Drypetes balakrishnanii – Bangladesh, Myanmar
18. Drypetes bathiei – Madagascar
19. Drypetes bawanii – Philippines
20. Drypetes bhattacharyae – Andaman & Nicobar
21. Drypetes bipindensis – C Africa
22. Drypetes bisacuta – Laos
23. Drypetes brownii – S Mexico, C America
24. Drypetes caesia – Sabah, Kalimantan
25. Drypetes calvescens – C Africa
26. Drypetes calyptosepala – Sumatra
27. Drypetes cambodica – Cambodia, Thailand, Myanmar
28. Drypetes capillipes – C Africa
29. Drypetes capuronii – Madagascar
30. Drypetes carolinensis – Yap
31. Drypetes castilloi – Sabah
32. Drypetes caustica – Réunion
33. Drypetes celastrinea – Cameroon
34. Drypetes celebica – Sulawesi, W New Guinea
35. Drypetes chevalieri – W + C Africa
36. Drypetes cinnabarina – C Africa
37. Drypetes cockburnii – Malaysia
38. Drypetes comorensis – Mayotte
39. Drypetes confertiflora – Karnataka
40. Drypetes congestiflora – China, Philippines
41. Drypetes convoluta – Luzon
42. Drypetes crassipes – Borneo, Sumatra, Malaysia
43. Drypetes cumingii – China, Philippines
44. Drypetes curtisii – S Indochina, Borneo
45. Drypetes darcyana – Mayotte
46. Drypetes darimontiana – Zaïre
47. Drypetes dasycarpa – Thailand
48. Drypetes dasyneura – Sumatra
49. Drypetes deplanchei – New Guinea, Australia, Vanuatu, New Caledonia
50. Drypetes detersibilis – Malaysia
51. Drypetes dewildei – Sumatra
52. Drypetes dinklagei – C Africa
53. Drypetes diopa – C Africa
54. Drypetes diversifolia – Florida Keys, Bahamas, Hispaniola
55. Drypetes dolichocarpa – Saipan
56. Drypetes dussii – Martinique
57. Drypetes eglandulosa – Bangladesh, Assam, Myanmar
58. Drypetes ellipsoidea – Leyte
59. †Drypetes elliptica – either Myanmar or Andaman Islands but extinct
60. Drypetes ellisii – Andaman Islands
61. Drypetes eriocarpa – Sarawak
62. Drypetes euryodes – Gabon, Angola
63. Drypetes falcata – Camiguin
64. Drypetes fallax – C Africa
65. Drypetes fanshawei – Venezuela, Guyana, Ecuador
66. Drypetes fernandopoana – Bioko
67. Drypetes floribunda – W Africa
68. Drypetes forbesii – Sumatra
69. Drypetes fusiformis – Sabah, Kalimantan
70. Drypetes gabonensis – Gabon, Congo
71. Drypetes gardneri – India, Sri Lanka
72. Drypetes gentryi – Mexico
73. Drypetes gerrardii – E + S Africa
74. Drypetes gerrardinoides – Tanzania
75. Drypetes gilgiana – W + C Africa
76. Drypetes gitingensis – Sibuyan
77. Drypetes glaberrima – W New Guinea
78. Drypetes glabra – Rolas I., São Tomé
79. Drypetes glabridiscus – Sulawesi
80. Drypetes glauca – West Indies
81. Drypetes globosa – Philippines
82. Drypetes gossweileri – C Africa
83. Drypetes gracilis – Cameroon
84. Drypetes grandifolia – Philippines
85. Drypetes guatemalensis – Guatemala
86. Drypetes hainanensis – Hainan, Thailand, Vietnam, Sabah, Sulawesi
87. Drypetes harmandii – Laos, Thailand
88. Drypetes helferi – Myanmar, Thailand
89. Drypetes henriquesii – São Tomé
90. Drypetes heptandra – Philippines
91. Drypetes hoaensis – Yunnan, Thailand, Vietnam
92. Drypetes iliae – Sabah, Sarawak
93. Drypetes ilicifolia – Jamaica, Dominican Rep, Puerto Rico
94. Drypetes impressinervis – Sarawak
95. Drypetes inaequalis – W Africa
96. Drypetes indica – S China, E Himalayas, N Indochina
97. Drypetes integerrima – Ogasawara-shoto, Kazan-retto
98. Drypetes integrifolia – S China
99. Drypetes iodoformis – Queensland
100. Drypetes ituriensis – C Africa
101. Drypetes ivorensis – W Africa
102. Drypetes jaintensis – Meghalaya
103. Drypetes kalamii – West Bengal, India
104. Drypetes kikir – Malaysia, Borneo
105. Drypetes klainei – W Africa
106. Drypetes kwangtungensis – Guangdong
107. Drypetes laciniata – W Africa
108. Drypetes laevis – Sumatra, Borneo
109. Drypetes lasiogynoides – New Guinea
110. Drypetes lateriflora – West Indies, Mexico, C America, Florida
111. Drypetes leiocarpa – Nicobar Islands
112. Drypetes leonensis – W + C Africa
113. Drypetes littoralis – Taiwan, Java, Sabah, Sulawesi, Philippines
114. Drypetes longifolia – SE Asia, New Guinea
115. Drypetes longistipitata – Hainan
116. Drypetes macrostigma – Kalimantan
117. Drypetes madagascariensis – Madagascar
118. Drypetes magnistipula – Gabon, Cameroon
119. Drypetes malabarica – Tamil Nadu
120. Drypetes maquilingensis – Philippines, Banggi, Sulawesi
121. Drypetes microphylla – Nicobar Is, Malaysia, W Indonesia, Philippines
122. Drypetes microphylloides – Sumatra
123. Drypetes mildbraedii – C Africa
124. Drypetes minahassae – Java, Sulawesi
125. Drypetes moliwensis – Cameroon
126. Drypetes molunduana – C Africa
127. Drypetes monachinoi – Bolívar
128. Drypetes monosperma – Luzon
129. Drypetes mossambicensis – SE Africa
130. Drypetes mucronata – Bahamas, Cuba
131. Drypetes nakaiana – Palau
132. Drypetes natalensis – E + S Africa
133. Drypetes neglecta – Indonesia
134. Drypetes nervosa – Malaysia
135. Drypetes nitida – Palau
136. Drypetes obanensis – C Africa
137. Drypetes oblongifolia – India, Sri Lanka
138. Drypetes obtusa – China, Vietnam
139. Drypetes occidentalis – C Africa
140. Drypetes ochrodasya – Sumatra
141. Drypetes ochrothrix – Thailand, Sabah
142. Drypetes oppositifolia – Madagascar
143. Drypetes ovalis – Java, Philippines
144. Drypetes oxyodonta – Malaysia
145. Drypetes pachycarpa – Malaysia
146. Drypetes pacifica – Fiji
147. Drypetes parvifolia – C Africa
148. Drypetes paxii- C Africa
149. Drypetes pellegrinii – W Africa
150. Drypetes peltophora – Cameroon
151. Drypetes pendula – Thailand, Malaysia, Borneo
152. Drypetes perakensis – Malaysia
153. Drypetes perreticulata – S China, N Indochina
154. Drypetes perrieri – Comoros, Madagascar
155. Drypetes picardae – Hispaniola
156. Drypetes pierreana – Gabon, Congo
157. Drypetes poilanei – Vietnam
158. Drypetes polyalthioides – Kalimantan
159. Drypetes polyantha – C Africa
160. Drypetes polyneura – Bangka, Sabah, Kalimantan
161. Drypetes porteri – Tamil Nadu
162. Drypetes preussii – W Africa
163. Drypetes principum – C + W Africa
164. Drypetes prunifera – Sabah
165. Drypetes reticulata – S + E Africa
166. Drypetes rhakodiskos – SE Asia
167. Drypetes riparia – Malaysia
168. Drypetes riseleyi – Seychelles
169. Drypetes rotensis – Rota in Micronesia
170. Drypetes rubriflora – Cameroon
171. Drypetes salicifolia – Yunnan, Laos, Vietnam
172. Drypetes sclerophylla – Kilwa in Tanzania
173. Drypetes sepiaria – India, Sri Lanka
174. Drypetes sessiliflora – S Brazil
175. Drypetes sherffii – Sumatra
176. Drypetes sibuyanensis – insular SE Asia
177. Drypetes simalurensis – Sumatra, Simeuluë
178. Drypetes singroboensis – Ivory Coast
179. Drypetes spinosodentata – C Africa
180. Drypetes standleyi – C America, Venezuela, Ecuador
181. Drypetes staudtii – Nigeria, Cameroon, Congo
182. Drypetes stipulacea – Madagascar
183. Drypetes stipularis – Cameroon, Equatorial Guinea
184. Drypetes stylosa – Sarawak
185. Drypetes subcrenata – Luzon
186. Drypetes subcubica – Java, Bali, New Guinea, Queensland
187. Drypetes subsessilis – E Himalayas, N Thailand, N Myanmar, Andaman Is
188. Drypetes subsymmetrica – Simeuluë
189. Drypetes sumatrana – Sumatra, Sri Lanka, Indochina, Nicobar Is, Flores
190. Drypetes talamauensis – Sumatra
191. Drypetes taylorii – Kenya
192. Drypetes tessmanniana – Cameroon, Equatorial Guinea
193. Drypetes thorelii – Cambodia, Vietnam
194. Drypetes thouarsiana – Madagascar
195. Drypetes thouarsii – Madagascar
196. †Drypetes tomentella – SE Asia but extinct
197. Drypetes ugandensis C + E Africa
198. Drypetes usambarica – Kenya, Tanzania
199. Drypetes variabilis N South America
200. Drypetes venusta – S India
201. Drypetes vernicosa – Queensland
202. Drypetes verrucosa – Gabon
203. Drypetes vilhenae – Angola
204. Drypetes viridis – Thailand, Malaysia
205. Drypetes vitiensis – Fiji, Niue, Samoa, Tonga
206. Drypetes wightii – S India
207. Drypetes xanthophylloides – Sarawak
208. Drypetes yapensis – Yap in Micronesia
