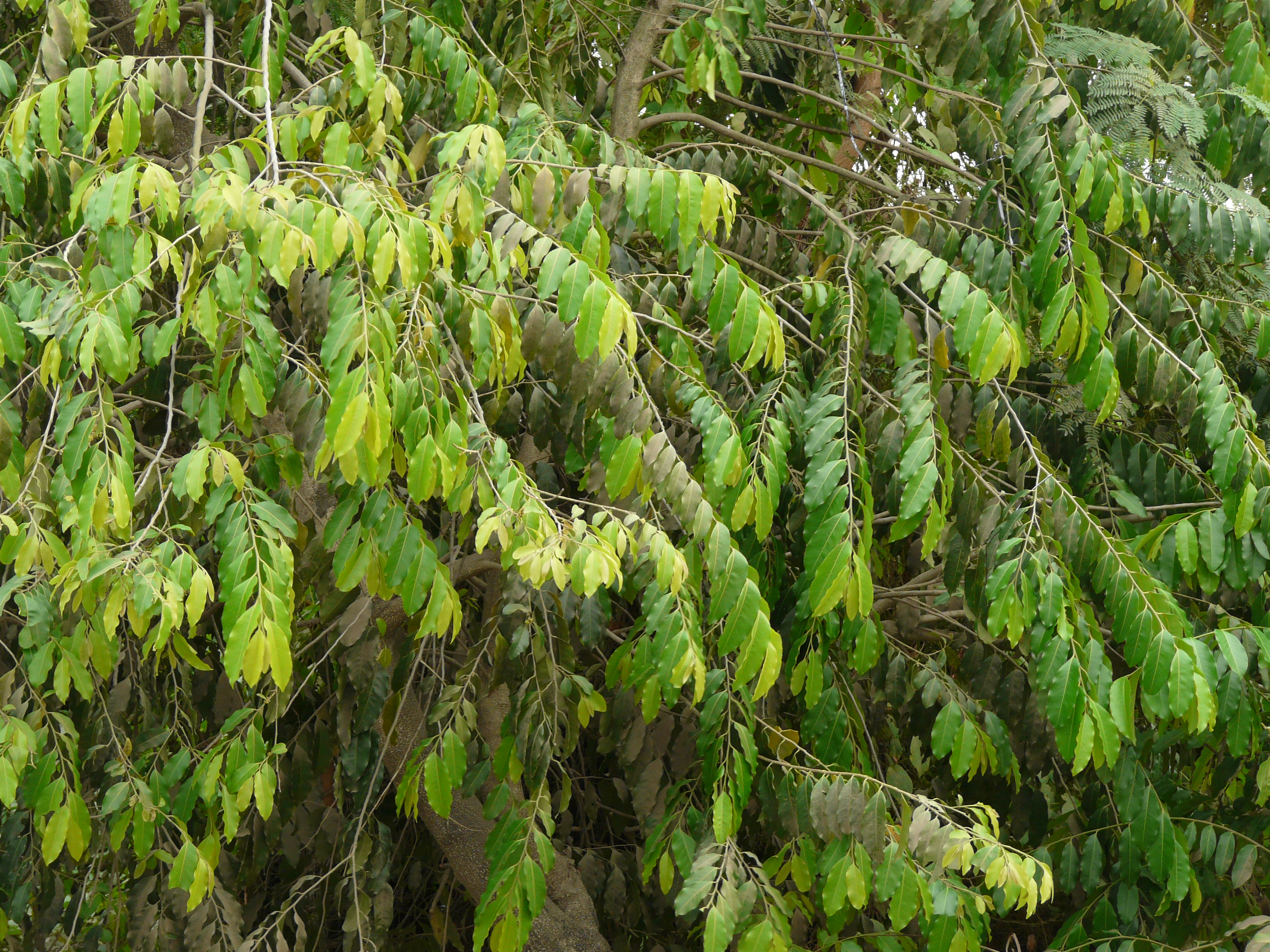

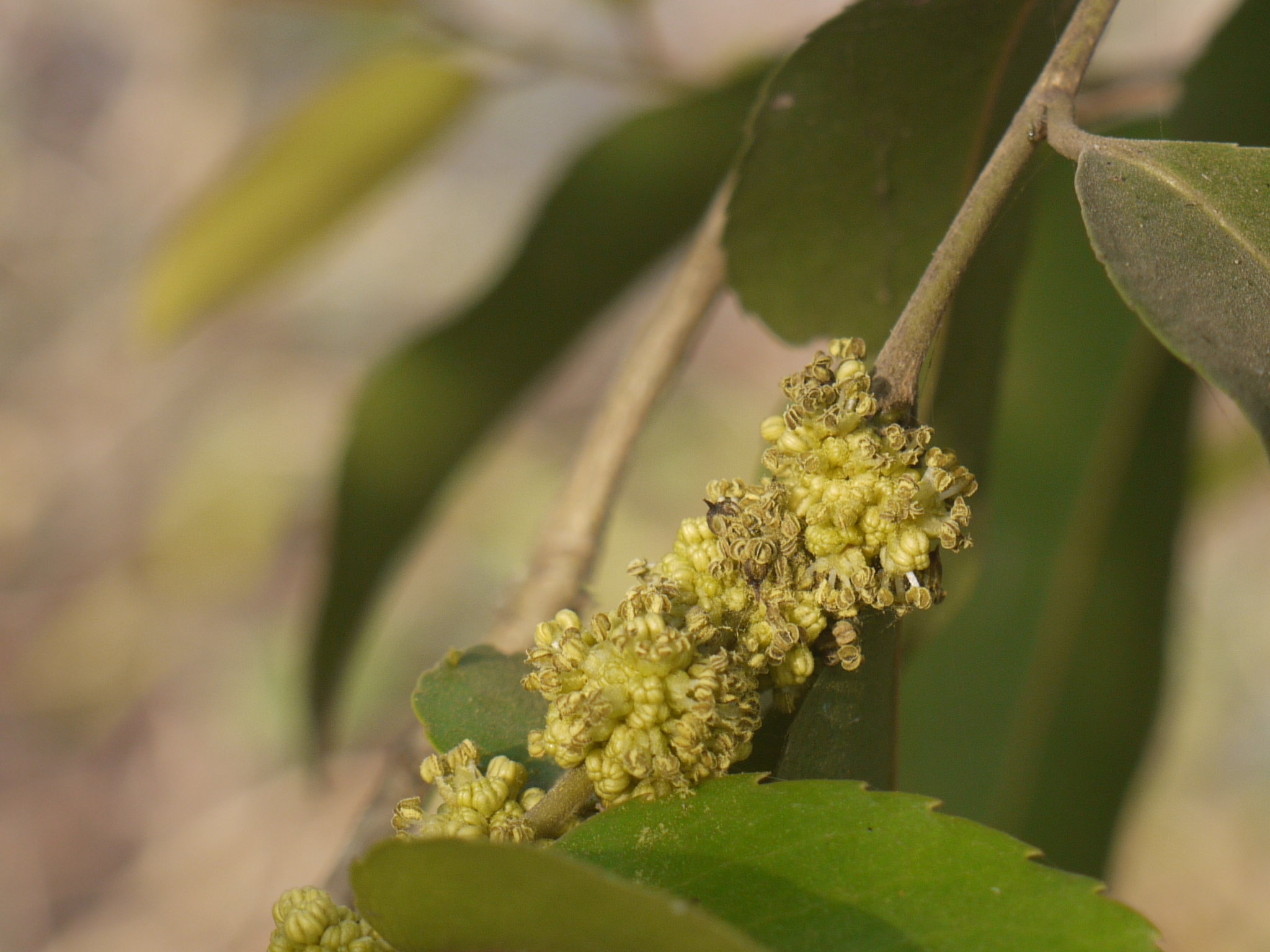
- Putranjiva roxburghii

Scientific classification
- Kingdom: Plantae
- Clade: Tracheophytes
- Clade: Angiosperms
- Clade: Eudicots
- Clade: Rosids
- Order: Malpighiales
- Family: Putranjivaceae; Endl.

Genera
- Drypetes – 214 spp.; Putranjiva – 4 spp.

= Putranjivaceae =

Family of trees

Putranjivaceae is a rosid family that is composed of 218 species in 2 genera of evergreen tropical trees that are found mainly in the Old World tropics, but with a few species in tropical America.

Members of this family have distichous and coriaceous leaves, which, if fresh, typically have a radish-like or peppery taste. The flowers are fasciculate and usually small, and the fruits of these species are a single-seeded drupe crown by the persistent stigmas. This family has its origin in Africa and Malesia. It is the only family outside those in the order Brassicales that produces mustard oils.

== Taxonomy ==
This family was formerly a tribe (Drypeteae) of the subfamily Phyllanthoideae in the Euphorbiaceae. When the Phyllanthoideae was separated to form the new family Phyllanthaceae, it was decided that the former Drypeteae would also stand alone, with the status of a family: Putranjivaceae.
