= Common albatross =

Common albatross may refer to:

- Birds in the family Diomedeidae, the albatrosses
- Butterflies of the genus Appias called albatrosses, and including:
  - Appias albina, of India, Southeast Asia and Australia
  - Appias paulina, found from India to Samoa
  - Appias sylvia, of Africa
