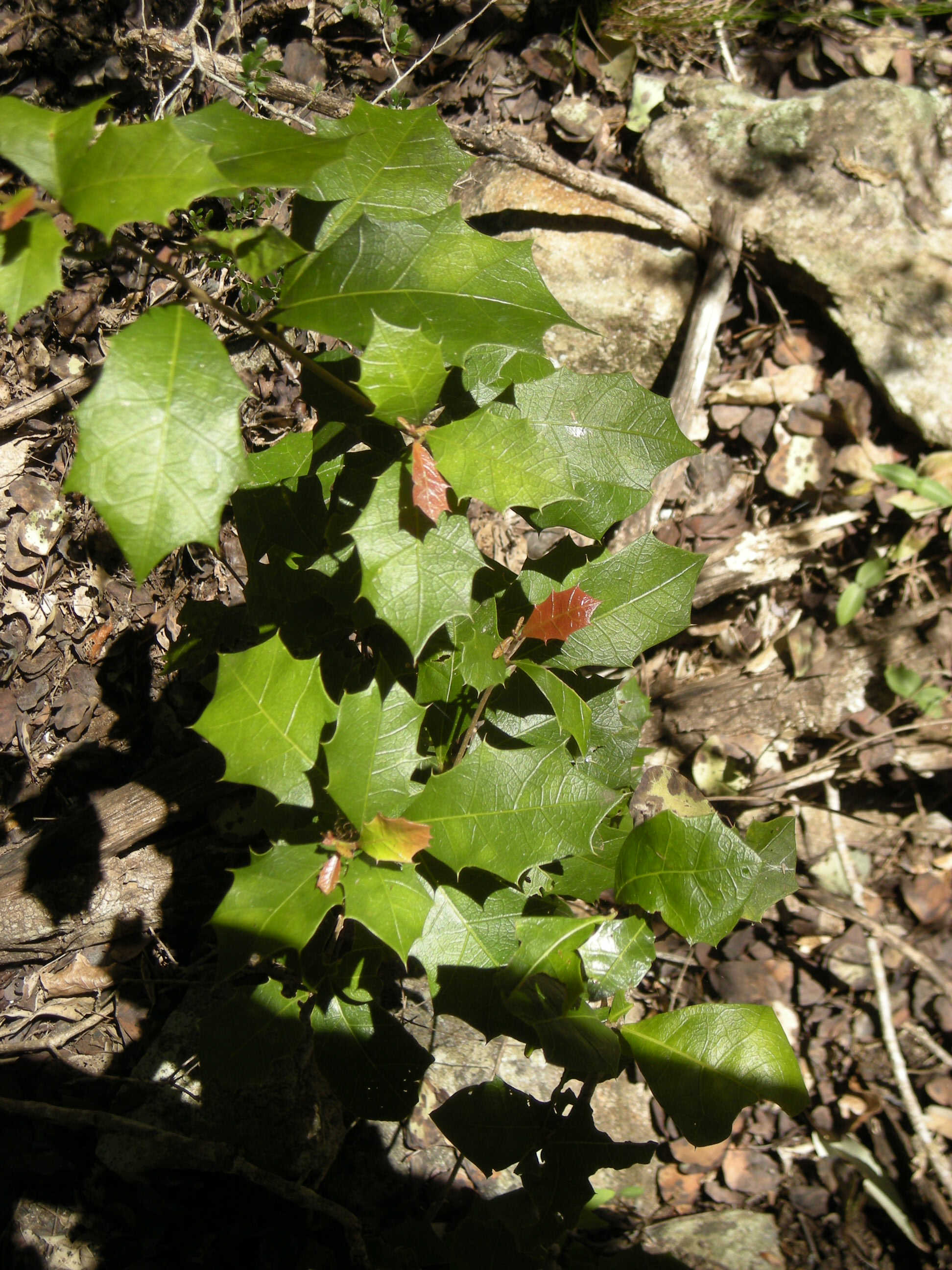
- At Mount Archer National Park

Conservation status
- Least Concern (IUCN 3.1)
- Least Concern (NCA)

Scientific classification
- Kingdom: Plantae
- Clade: Embryophytes
- Clade: Tracheophytes
- Clade: Spermatophytes
- Clade: Angiosperms
- Clade: Eudicots
- Clade: Rosids
- Order: Malpighiales
- Family: Euphorbiaceae
- Genus: Alchornea
- Species: A. ilicifolia

Binomial name
- Alchornea ilicifolia (J.Sm.) Muell.Arg.

Synonyms
- Homotypic: Alchornea aquifolia Domin; Coelebogyne ilicifolia (J.Sm.); Heterotypic: Alchornea thozetiana (Baill.) Benth.; Alchornea thozetiana var. longifolia Benth.; Caelebogyne aquifolium (Js.Sm.) Domin; Caelebogyne thozetiana (Baill.) Pax & K.Hoffm.; Cladodes thozetiana Baill.; Sapium aquifolium Js.Sm.; Sapium berberifolium Meisn.

= Alchornea ilicifolia =

Native holly

Species of plant native to Australia

Alchornea ilicifolia, commonly known as the native holly, is a bush of eastern Australia. It grows in or on the edges of the drier rainforests in coastal parts of New South Wales and Queensland.

== Description ==
The native holly is a shrub or rarely a small tree up to 6 m (20 ft) tall. The trunk is usually crooked, with pale grey smooth bark, and some pustules and lenticels. Small branches are greenish or fawn in colour, with paler lenticels. The leaves are holly-like in appearance, 2 to 8 cm (0.8 to 3 in) long and 2 to 5 cm (0.8 to 2 in) wide. They are ovate or rhomboidal in shape with three or four acute lobes on each side, each of which is armed with a sharp spine. They are stiff and glabrous with a petiole around 3 mm (0.1 in) long.

=== Flowers and fruit ===
Greenish flowers appear in November, on racemes up to 5 cm (2 in) long, with male and female flowers on separate plants. The fruit is a dark brown, three-lobed capsule about 6 to 8 mm (0.2 to 0.3 in) in diameter, each lobe containing one seed. The plant may flower and fruit at any time of year after rain events.

== Taxonomy ==
The botanist John Smith originally described this species as Caelebogyne ilicifolia in 1839, from three specimens collected by Allan Cunningham in 1829. The Swiss botanist Johann Müller gave it its current name in 1865. The generic name Alchornea honours the English botanist Stanesby Alchorne, while the species epithet ilicifolia refers to the holly-like leaves (Ilex).

== Distribution and habitat ==
This species grows in vine thickets and monsoon forest on a variety of soil types, from Jamberoo on the south coast of New South Wales to Atherton in far north Queensland.

== Ecology ==
Alchornea ilicifolia is a host plant for the larvae of the common albatross butterfly and the moth Dichomeris mesoctenis.

== Gallery ==
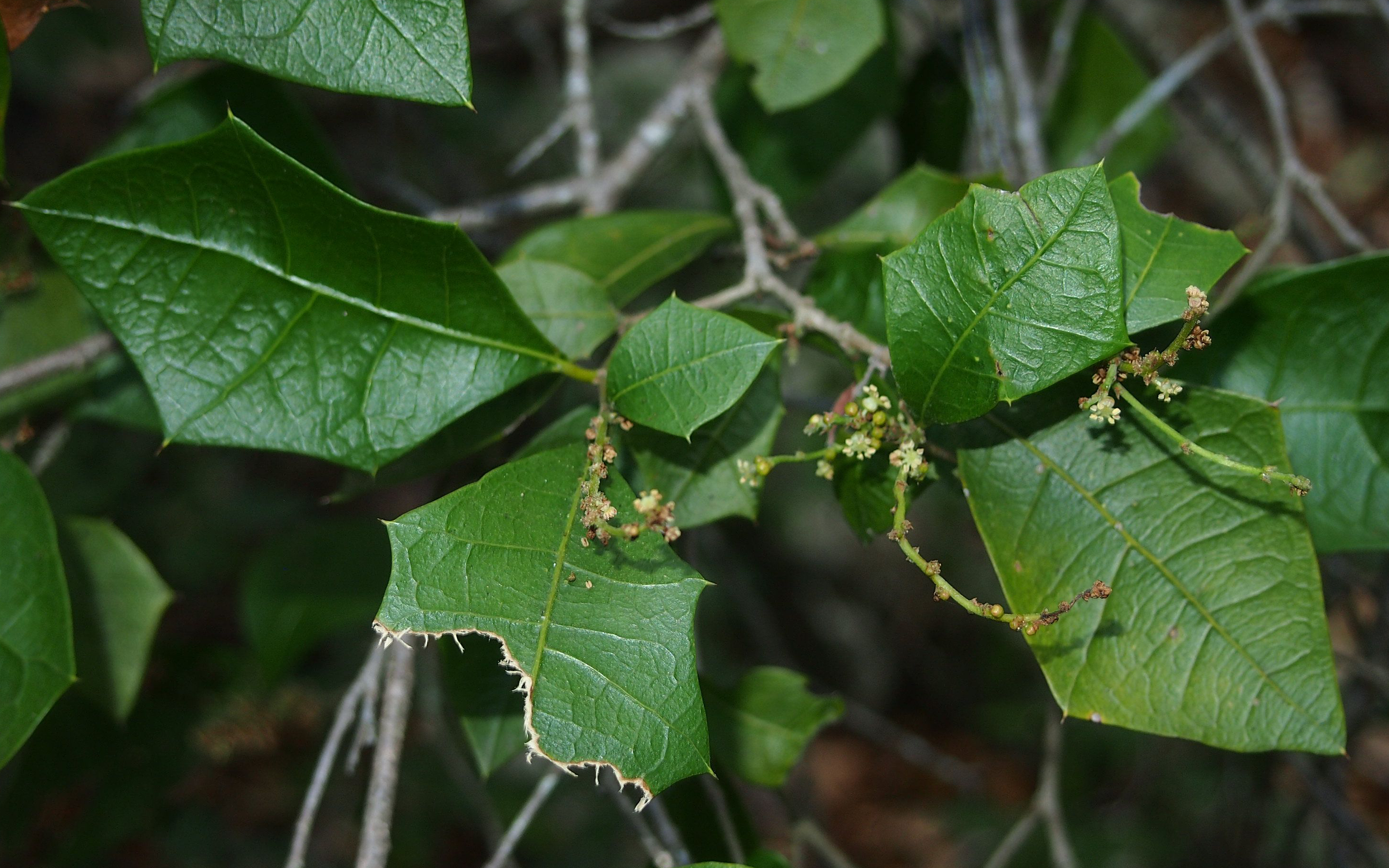
Flowers

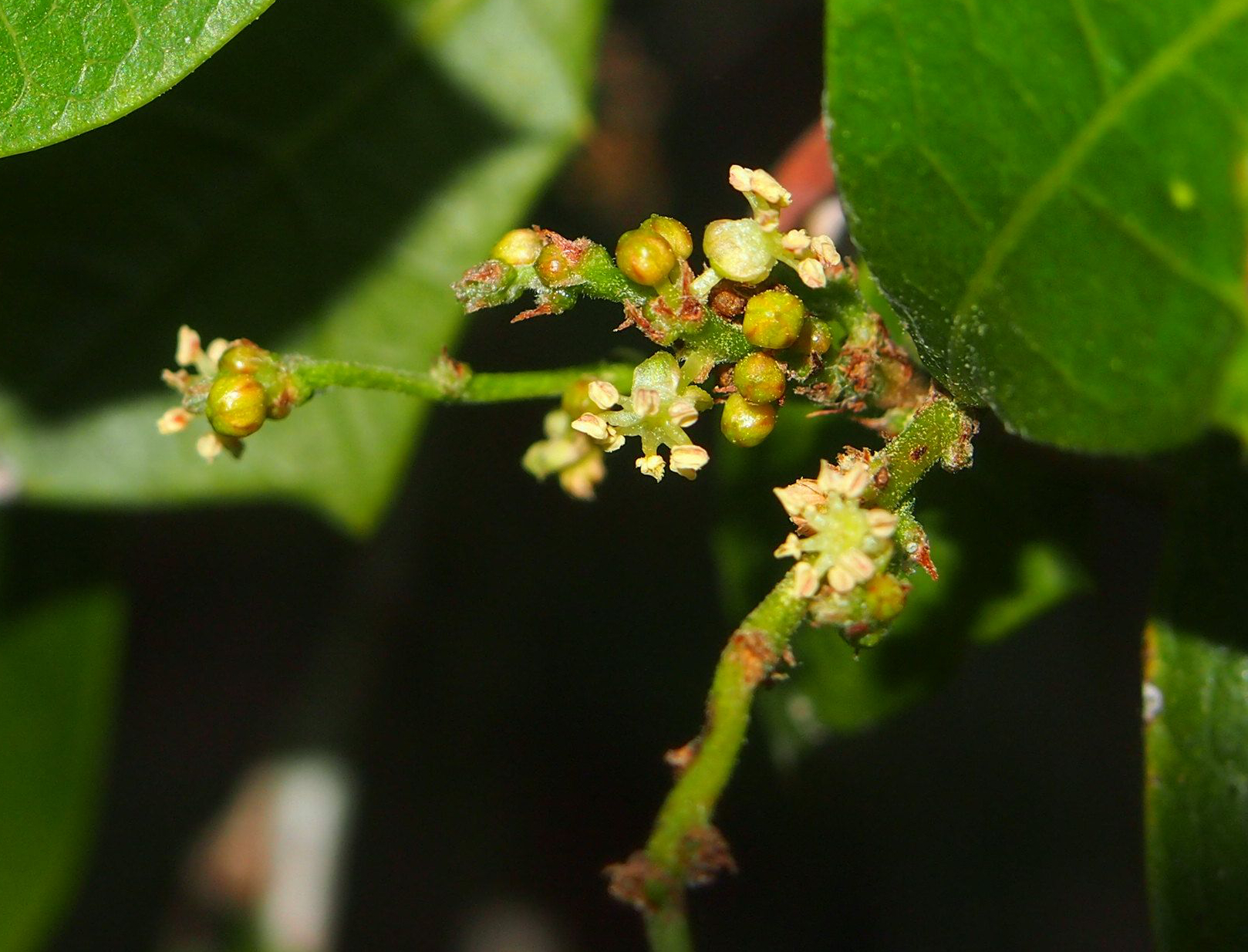
Flowers

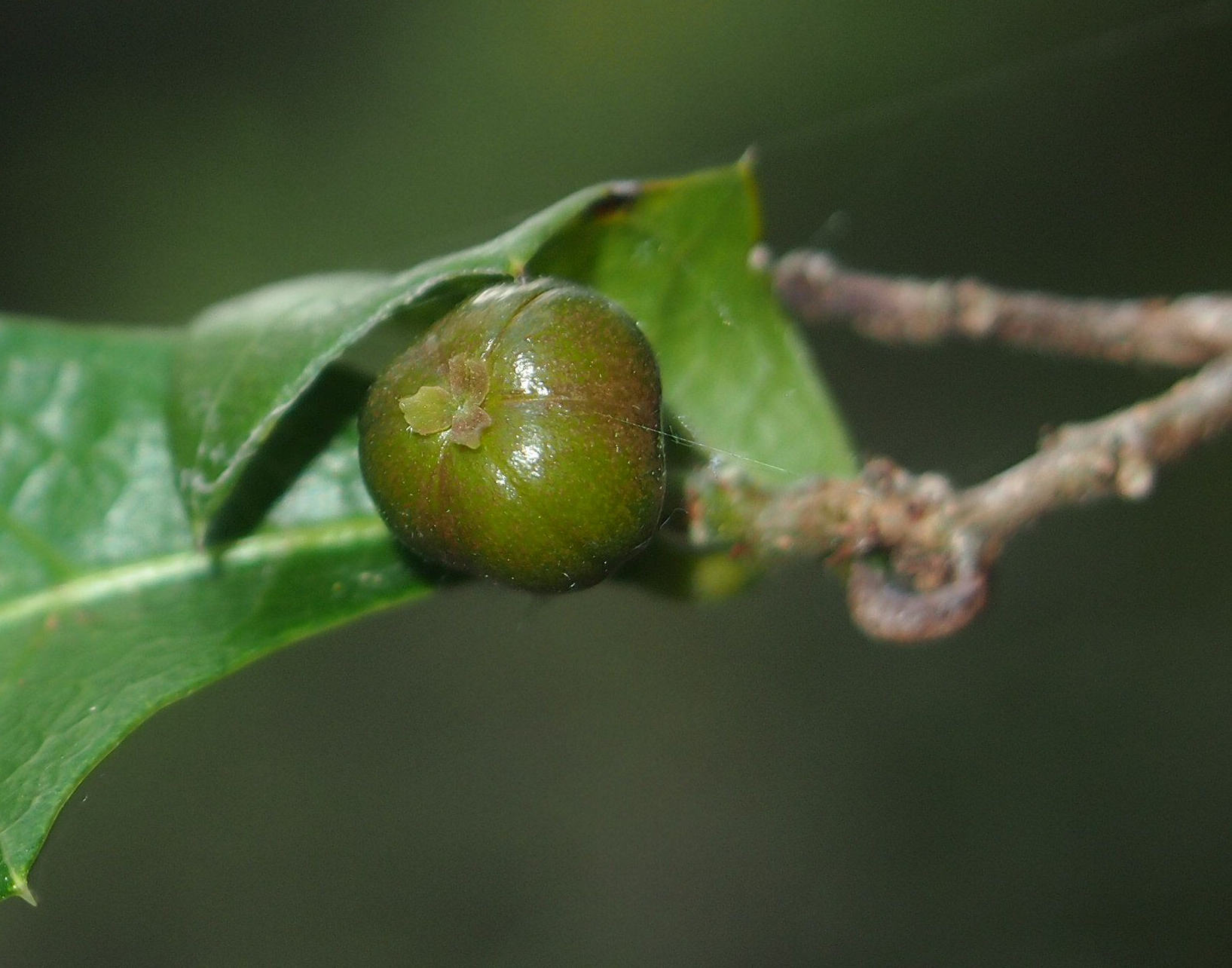
Unripe fruit

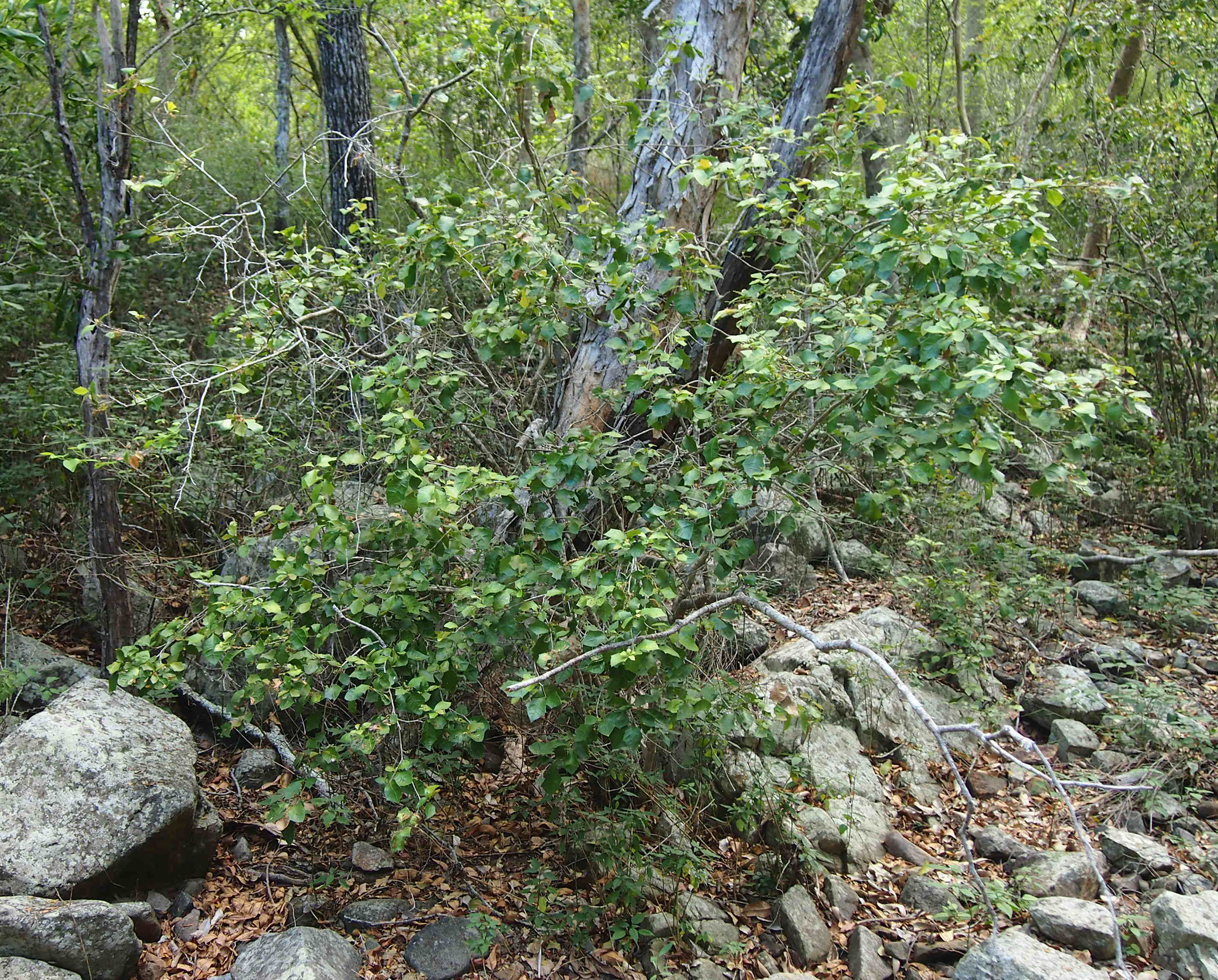
Habit
