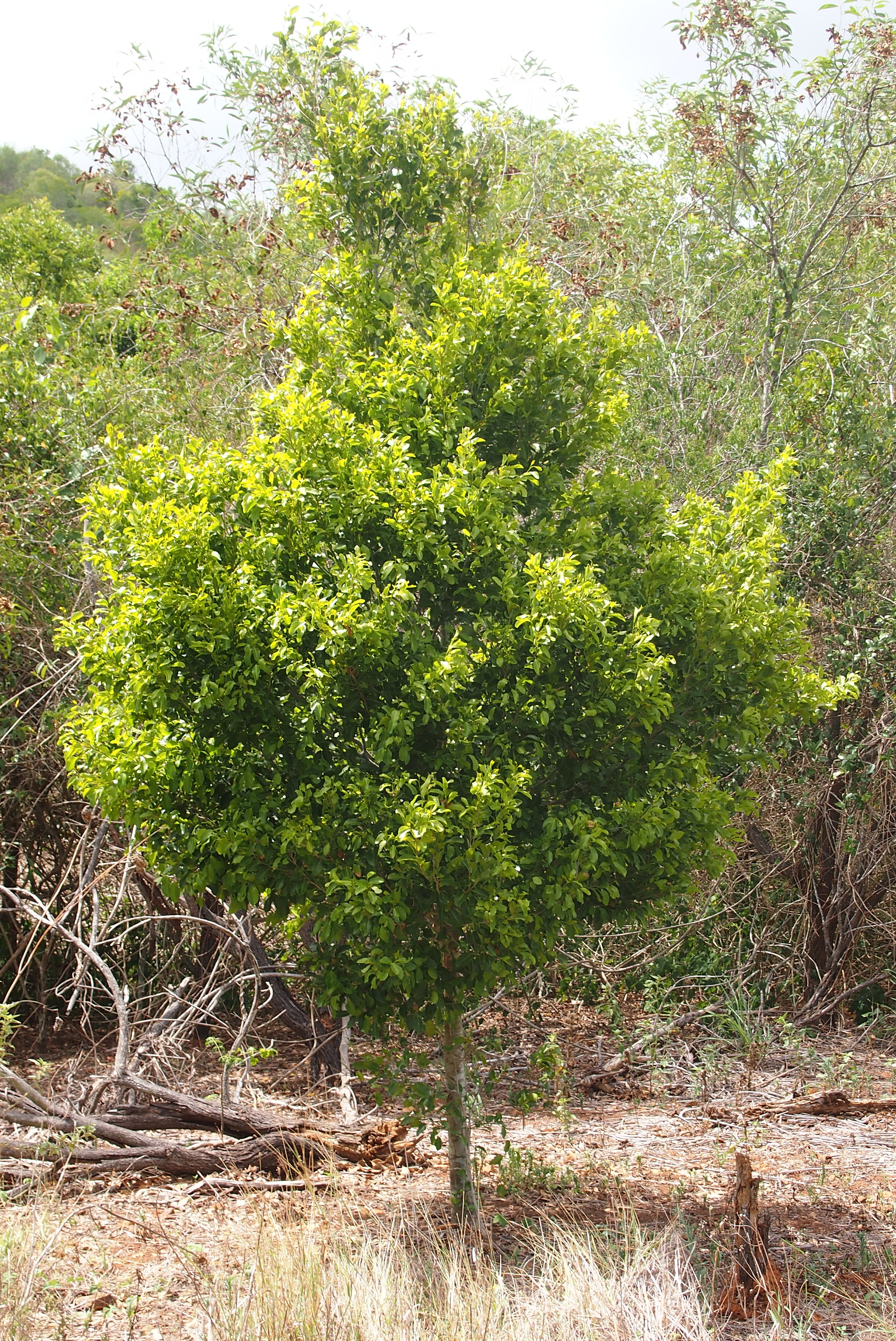
- In Mount Etna Caves National Park, Queensland

Conservation status
- Least Concern (IUCN 3.1)

Scientific classification
- Kingdom: Plantae
- Clade: Embryophytes
- Clade: Tracheophytes
- Clade: Angiosperms
- Clade: Eudicots
- Clade: Rosids
- Order: Malpighiales
- Family: Putranjivaceae
- Genus: Drypetes
- Species: D. deplanchei

Binomial name
- Drypetes deplanchei (Brongn. & Gris) Merr.

Synonyms
- Hemecyclia australasica Mull.Arg.; Drypetes australasica Mull.Arg. Pax. & K.Hoffm.

= Drypetes deplanchei =

Yellow tulip

Species of tree

Drypetes deplanchei is a tree of eastern and northern Australia. It also occurs in New Caledonia and Lord Howe Island. The genus is derived from the Greek, dryppa meaning "olive fruit". The species named after Dr. Emile Deplanche, who collected this plant at New Caledonia. Common names include yellow tulip, grey boxwood, white myrtle, grey bark and yellow tulipwood.

== Distribution and habitat ==
Occurring as far south as the Hunter River, New South Wales, north to Torres Strait across the Top End of the Northern Territory and The Kimberley in Western Australia. The subspecies affinis is endemic to Lord Howe Island. The habitat varies, but it is often found in monsoon forest, drier rainforest, as well as littoral rainforest, and rainforest by streams.

== Description ==
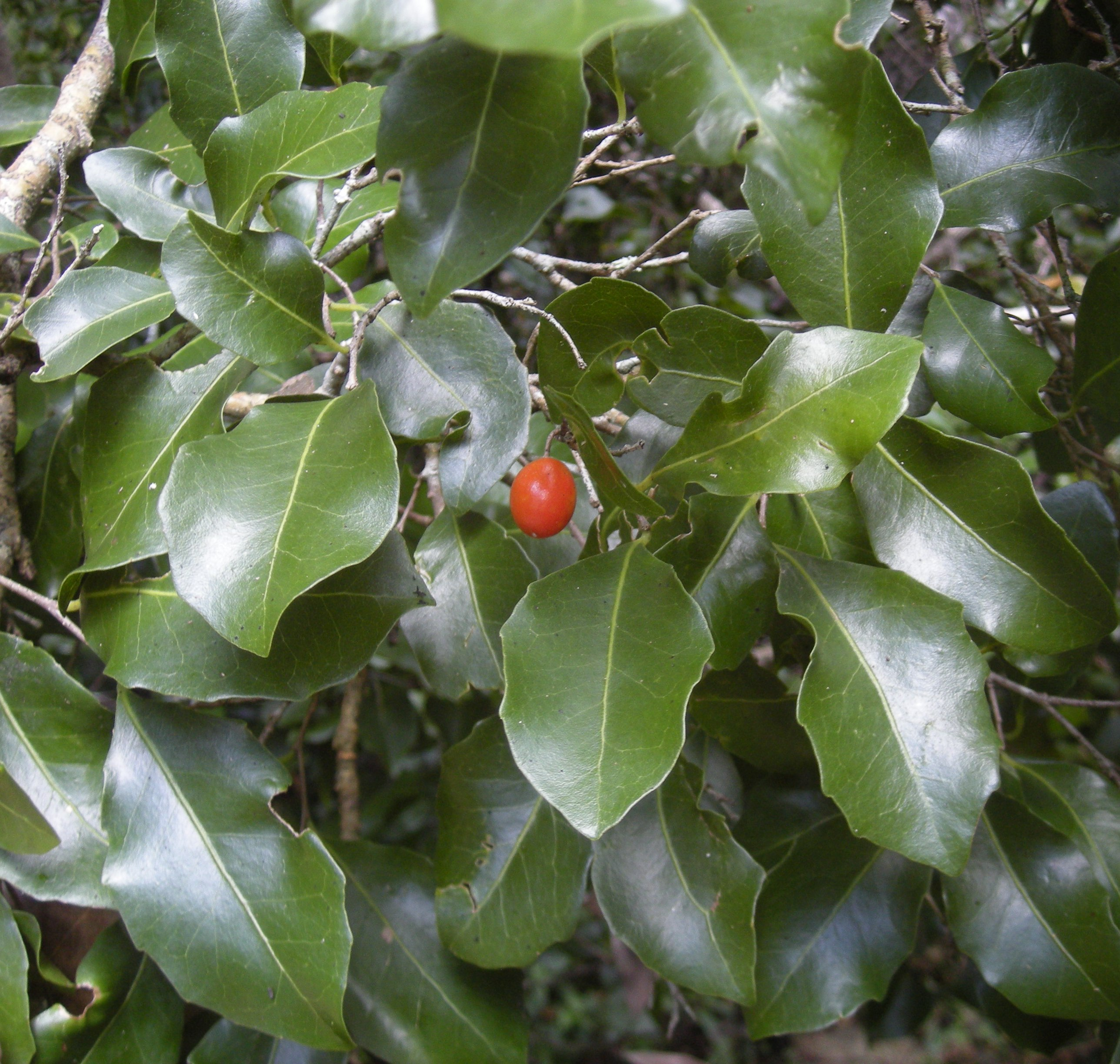
Flowers and foliage

A small to medium-sized tree, up to 25 metres tall and a stem width of 60 cm. The tree is often flanged at the butt and lower part of the trunk. Grey or brown bark, often with scales of bark which fall, leaving shallow depressions. This results in a mottled appearance, similar to the tulipwood. Bark scaly and pustular on older trees. Small branches smooth, slender, grey in colour. Dotted with many lenticels.

=== Leaves ===
Elliptical, ovate to ovate-oblong in shape, 4 to 9 cm long, 1 to 5 cm wide. Wavy edged, stiff, thick. Margins toothed, without teeth or with scalloped margins. Leaves abruptly tapered at the base, with a leaf tip or rounded at the end. Hairless and glossy green, somewhat paler green underneath. Leaf stems 3 to 6 mm long. Juvenile leaves prominently toothed. Leaf veins easily noticed, raised on both sides of the leaf. Five to seven lateral veins, at around 65 degrees to the midrib.

=== Flowers and fruit ===
Yellow brown flowers form in November, from the forks of the leaves. Male and female flowers on separate trees. Individual flowers around 4 mm in diameter. Male flowers in axillary racemes with a perianth around 2 mm long, with 5 to 10 stamens. Female flowers solitary or in clusters of 3 or 4.

The fruit is a bright red drupe. 12 to 20 mm long with moist yellow flesh inside. The single seed is about 12 mm long, oval in shape with a groove on one side. Fruit mature from February to April. Eaten by the emerald dove, topknot pigeon and wompoo fruit dove. Germination from seed is slow.

== Uses ==
Previously used as bullock whip handles, in the Richmond River district, northern New South Wales. Indigenous Australians ate the fruit raw, and used leaves in cooking, as well as carving the wood.

Early settlers on Lord Howe Island used the timber for sea piles because the sap repels marine worms.

== Ecology ==
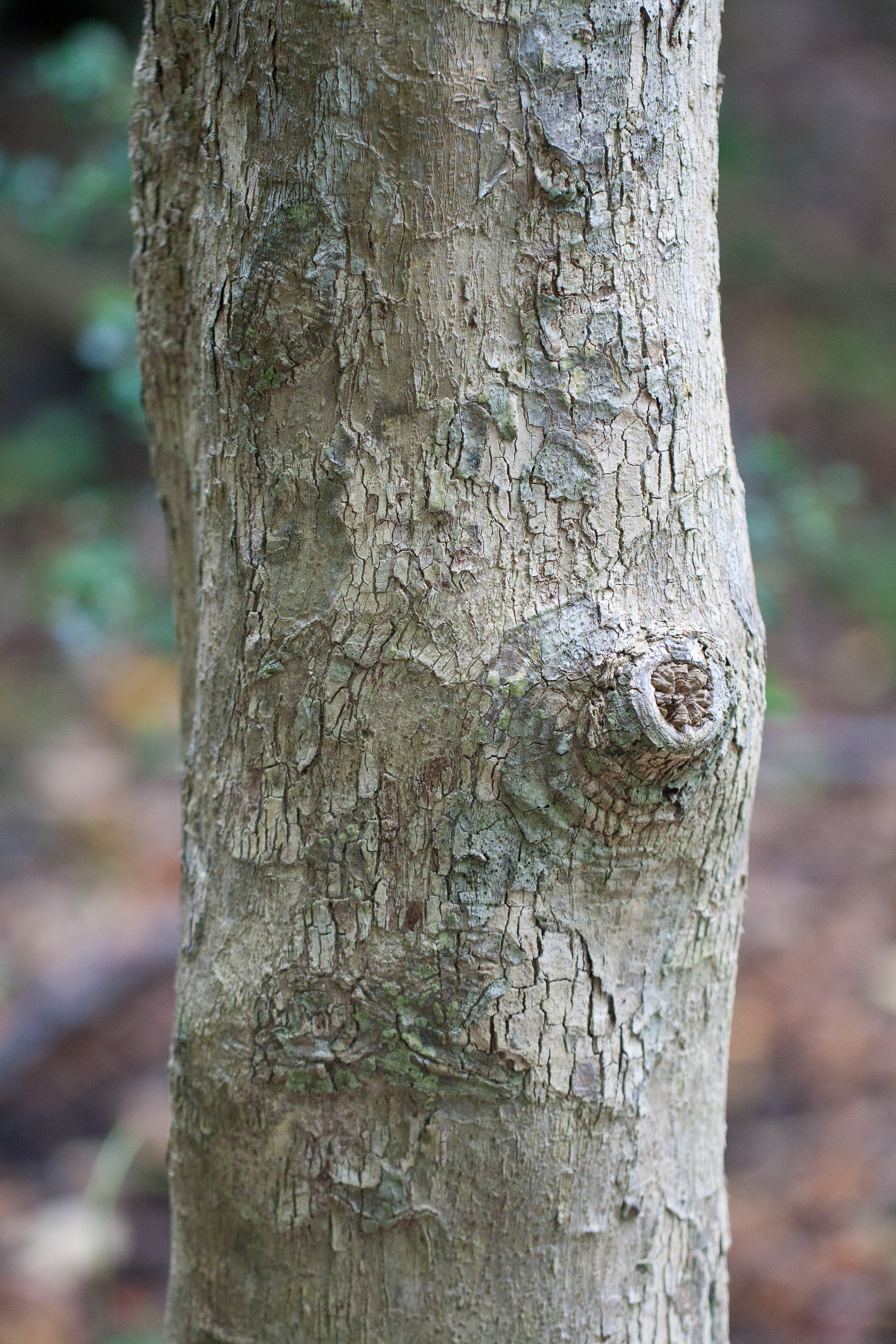
Trunk

A food source for a variety of insects. Such as the common albatross butterfly. Possibly also a food source for the critically endangered Lord Howe Island stick insect
