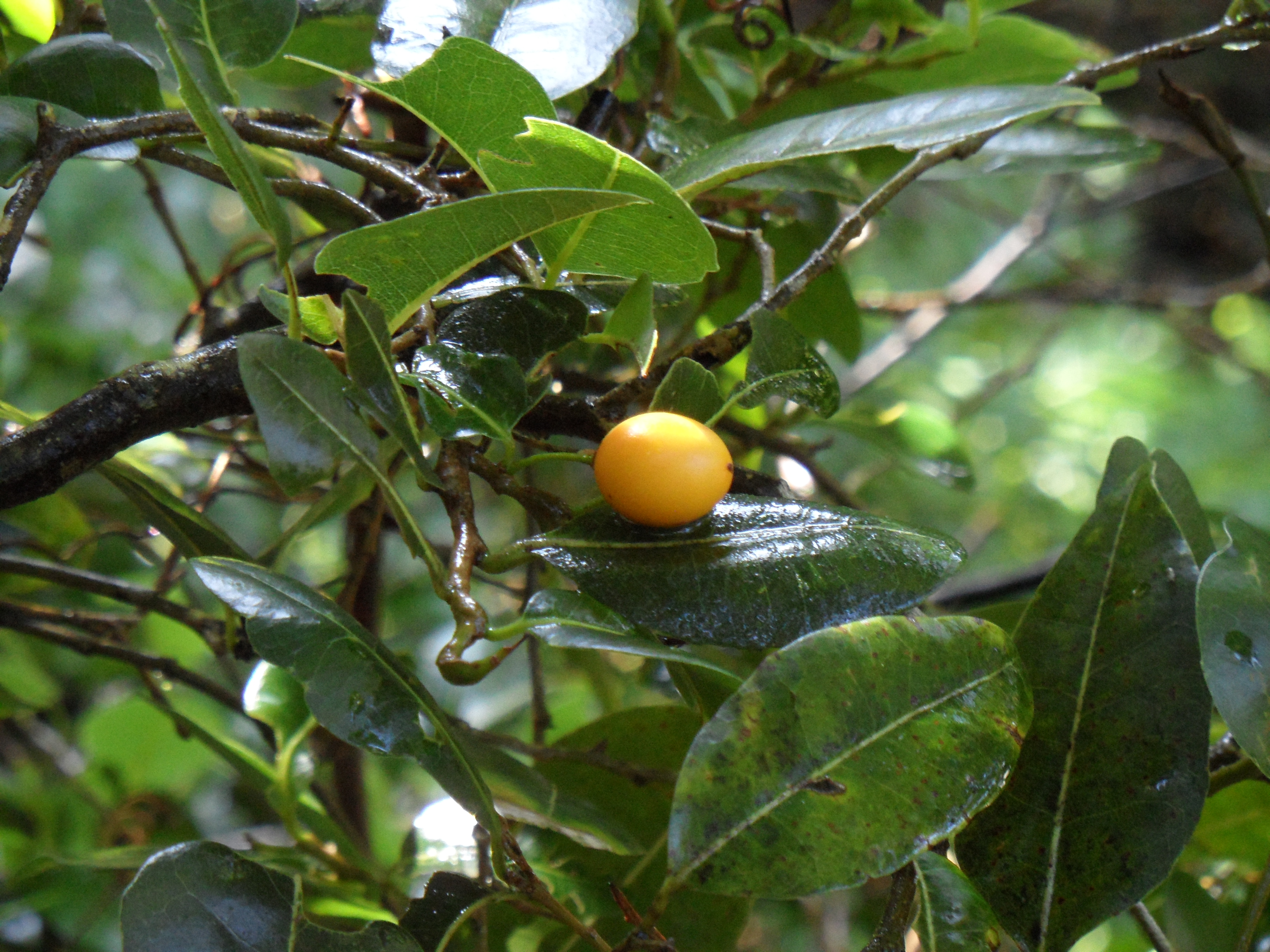
- Leaves and fruit

Scientific classification
- Kingdom: Plantae
- Clade: Tracheophytes
- Clade: Angiosperms
- Clade: Eudicots
- Clade: Rosids
- Order: Malpighiales
- Family: Putranjivaceae
- Genus: Drypetes
- Species: D. deplanchei
- Subspecies: D. d. subsp. affinis

Trinomial name
- Drypetes deplanchei subsp. affinis (Pax & K.Hoffm.) P.S.Green

Synonyms
- Drypetes affinis Pax & K.Hoffm.; Drypetes lasiogyna subsp. affinis (Pax & K.Hoffm.) P.S.Green

= Drypetes deplanchei subsp. affinis =

Subspecies of flowering plant

Drypetes deplanchei subsp. affinis, commonly known as greybark or grey bark, is a flowering plant in the Putranjivaceae family. The subspecific epithet affinis ("similar to") alludes to its similarity to Drypetes sepiaria of India and Sri Lanka.

== Description ==
It is a tree growing to 16 m in height, with smooth, pale grey bark often mottled pink with lichens. The leathery, oval leaves are usually 50–80 mm long and 30–40 mm wide. The small green flowers are 6 mm across, appearing from the end of December to late January. The oval, orange-red to yellow fruits are 20–25 mm long.

== Distribution and habitat ==
The subspecies is endemic to Australia's subtropical Lord Howe Island in the Tasman Sea. There it is one of the most common and widespread trees in the lowlands.
