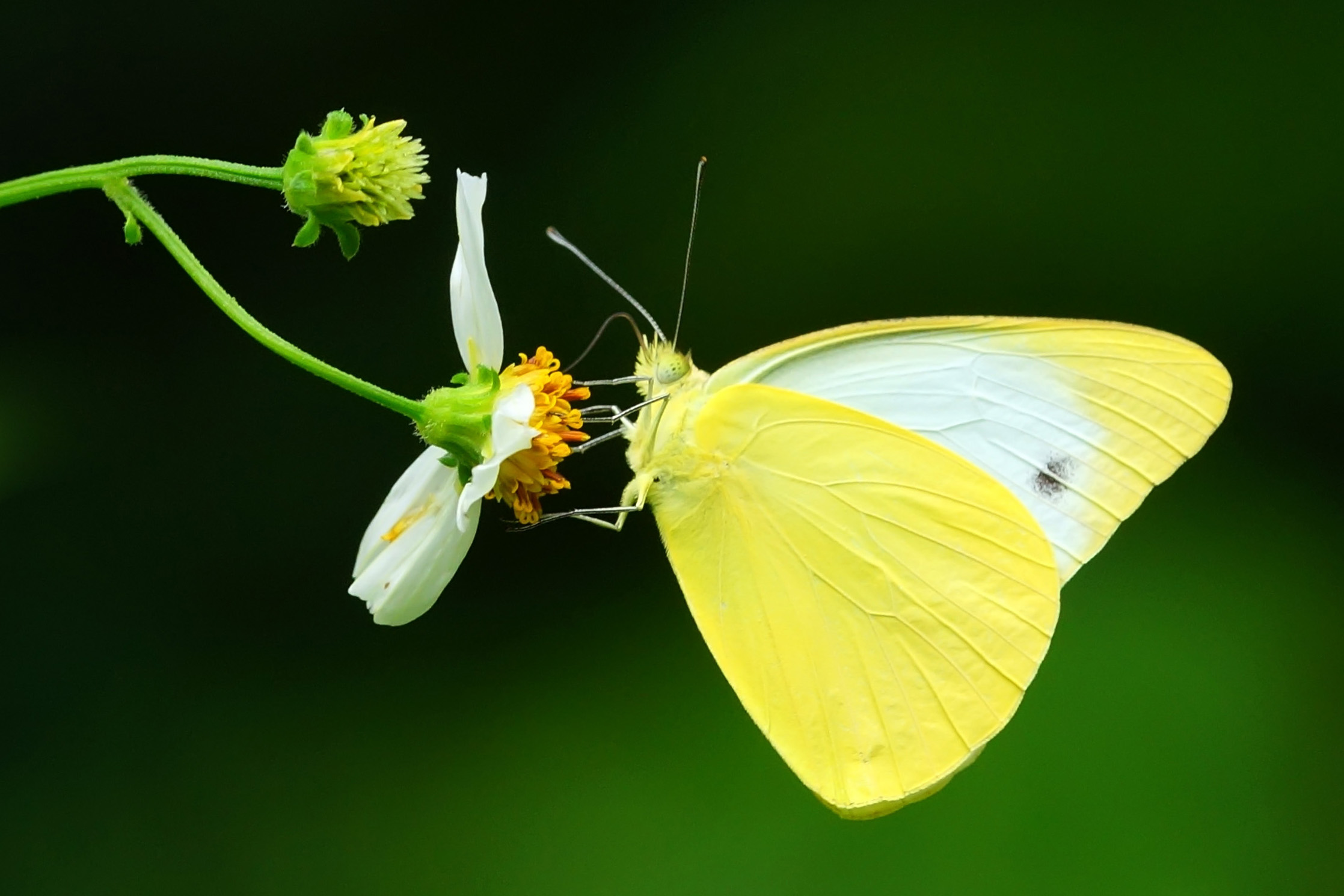

Scientific classification
- Kingdom: Animalia
- Phylum: Arthropoda
- Clade: Pancrustacea
- Class: Insecta
- Order: Lepidoptera
- Family: Pieridae
- Genus: Appias
- Species: A. paulina

Binomial name
- Appias paulina (Cramer, [1777])

Synonyms
- Papilio paulina Cramer, [1777]; Pieris capparidis Swainson, 1851 (nom. nud.); Pieris ega Boisduval, 1836; Appias eurosundana Grose-Smith, 1895; Appias saina Grose-Smith, 1894; Appias ambigua Grose-Smith, 1895

= Appias paulina =

Species of butterfly

Appias paulina, known variously as the yellow albatross, lesser albatross, common albatross or Christmas Island white, is a butterfly of the family Pieridae. It is found from India to Samoa, including Indonesia, Japan, Malaysia, New Caledonia, Thailand and Australia.

The wingspan is about 50 mm.The male and female are a white to light yellow colour on both sides. The tip of the front wings is broadly edged with black and decorated with white spots on top. In the yellow forms, the hind wing is entirely yellow, while on the front wing only the tip is yellow.

The larvae feed on Drypetes australasica, Drypetes deplanchei and Alchornea ilicifolia.

== Subspecies ==
Varies depending on sources, but some lists may include:

- Appias paulina adamsoni (Indochina, plus India [Assam])
- Appias paulina cynisca (Buru)
- Appias paulina distanti (Malaysia [peninsula])
- Appias paulina ega (Australia: Northern Territory to Cape York)
- Appias paulina eurosundana (Timor)
- Appias paulina falcidia (Biak)
- Appias paulina griseoides (Vietnam)
- Appias paulina grisea
- Appias paulina galathea (India: Andamans, Nicobars)
- Appias paulina micromalayana (Java, Bawean, Tenimber)
- Appias paulina minato (Japan, Taiwan)
- Appias paulina paula (Wetar)
- Appias paulina paulina
- Appias paulina saina (West Irian to Papua)
- Appias paulina zoe (Moluccas)
