= Dichomeris mesoctenis =

Scientific classification
- Kingdom: Animalia
- Phylum: Arthropoda
- Class: Insecta
- Order: Lepidoptera
- Family: Gelechiidae
- Genus: Dichomeris
- Species: D. mesoctenis

Binomial name
- Dichomeris mesoctenis Meyrick, 1921

Species of moth

Dichomeris mesoctenis is a moth in the family Gelechiidae. It was described by Edward Meyrick in 1921. It is found in Australia, where it has been recorded from Queensland.

The wingspan is about 16 mm (0.63 in). The forewings are fuscous, sprinkled with obscure brown strigulae and minute blackish dots. The costal edge is dark fuscous at the base, then rosy brown to three-fourths. There is some darker suffusion towards the dorsum near the base. The stigmata are small, blackish and accompanied by some white scales, the plical rather before the first discal. There is also a small blackish mark on the dorsum at four-fifths. The hindwings are grey.
