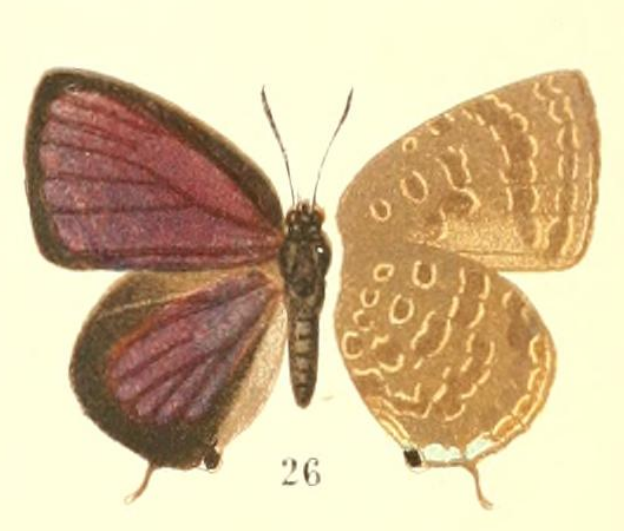

Scientific classification
- Kingdom: Animalia
- Phylum: Arthropoda
- Class: Insecta
- Order: Lepidoptera
- Family: Lycaenidae
- Genus: Arhopala
- Species: A. quercoides

Binomial name
- Arhopala quercoides Bethune-Baker, 1902

Synonyms
- Narathura quercoides

= Arhopala quercoides =

Species of butterfly

Arhopala quercoides is a butterfly in the family Lycaenidae. It was discovered by George Thomas Bethune-Baker in 1902. It is found in Sulawesi.

== Description ==
The upperside is dark blue in the male and blue in the female. The underside is rough fawn in color, with the whitish-bordered spots and bands darker for both sexes.
