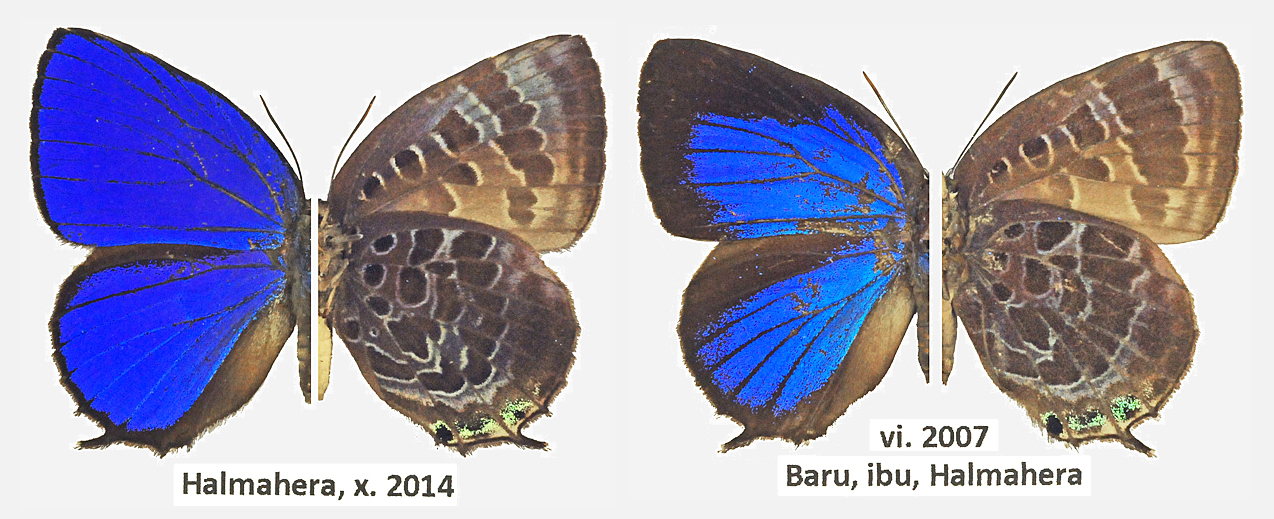
- Arhopala lata male/female, Halmaheira.

Scientific classification
- Kingdom: Animalia
- Phylum: Arthropoda
- Clade: Pancrustacea
- Class: Insecta
- Order: Lepidoptera
- Family: Lycaenidae
- Genus: Arhopala
- Species: A. lata

Binomial name
- Arhopala lata (Evans, 1957)

= Arhopala lata =

Species of butterfly

Arhopala lata, is a butterfly in the family Lycaenidae. It was described by William Harry Evans in 1957. It is found in the Australasian realm where it is endemic to Halmahera.

== Description ==
Upperside very similar to Arhopala meander. Below dark purple-brown, markings very broad, with, uniquely, a spot at the base of space 6
