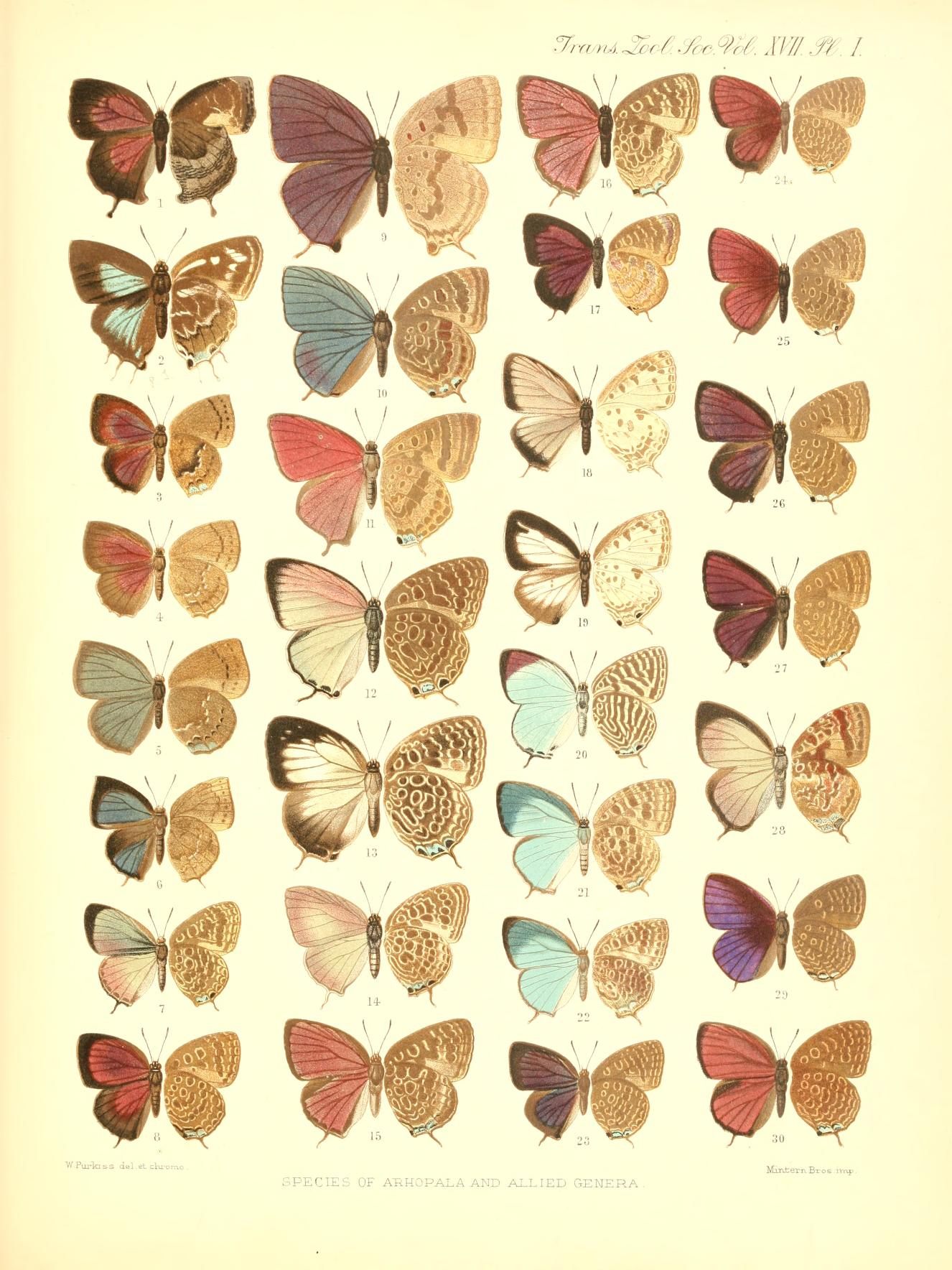
- Arhopala alexandrae in Bethune-Baker as Arhopola viola (figure 7)

Scientific classification
- Kingdom: Animalia
- Phylum: Arthropoda
- Clade: Pancrustacea
- Class: Insecta
- Order: Lepidoptera
- Family: Lycaenidae
- Genus: Arhopala
- Species: A. alexandrae

Binomial name
- Arhopala alexandrae Schröder & Treadaway, 1978

Synonyms
- Arhopala viola Bethune-Baker, 1903; Narathura nakamotoi Hayashi, 1978

= Arhopala alexandrae =

Species of butterfly

Arhopala alexandrae is a butterfly in the family Lycaenidae. It was described by Schröder & Treadaway in 1978. It is endemic to the Philippines (Bohol, Mindanao, Panay, Luzon, and Marinduque) in the Indomalayan realm.
