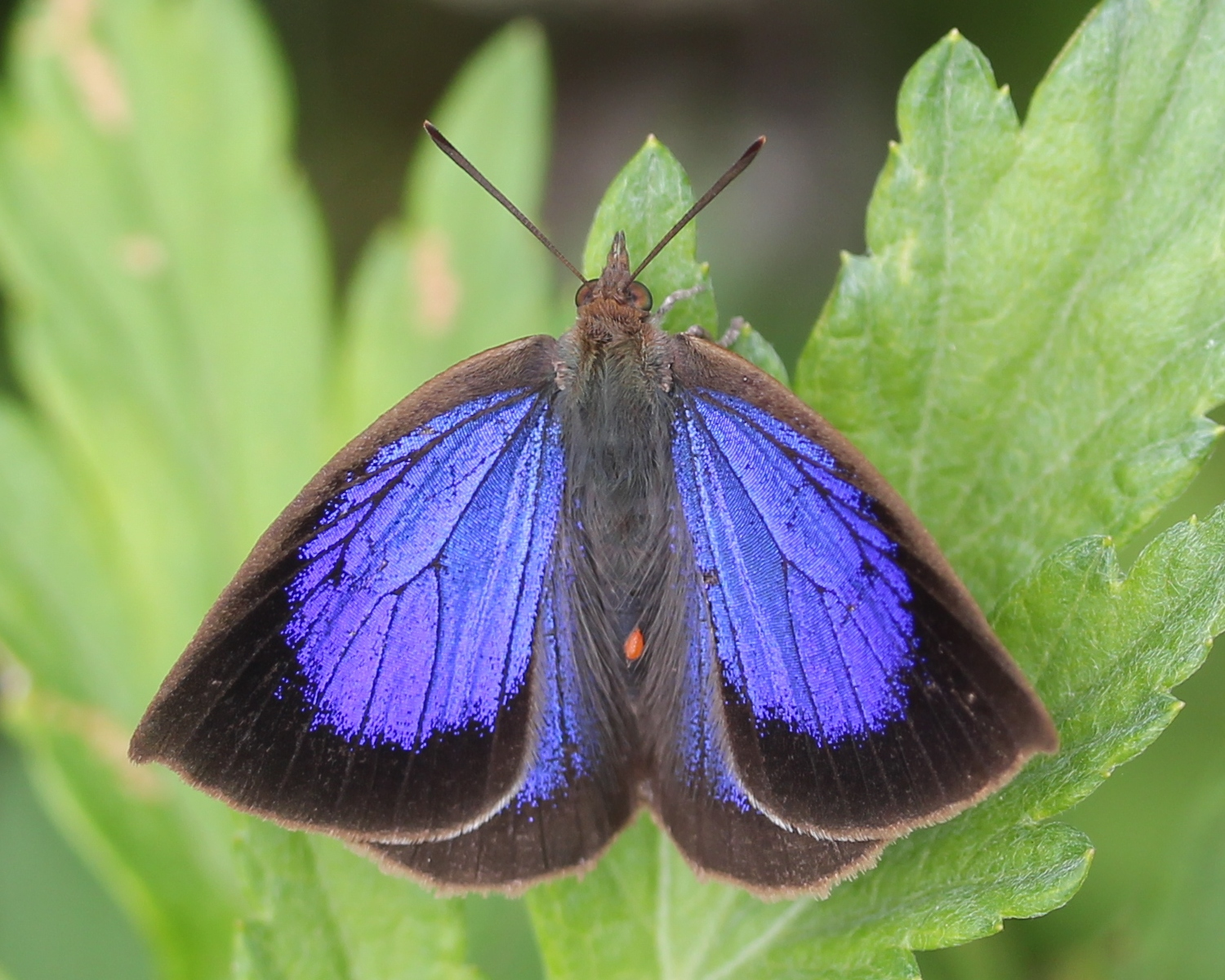
- Arhopala japonica is of unclear affiliations. When Narathura was considered distinct, it was placed there.

Scientific classification
- Domain: Eukaryota
- Kingdom: Animalia
- Phylum: Arthropoda
- Class: Insecta
- Order: Lepidoptera
- Family: Lycaenidae
- Tribe: Arhopalini
- Genus: Arhopala; Boisduval, 1832

Type species
- Arhopala phryxus Boisduval, 1832

Diversity
- About 220 species

Synonyms
- Several, see text

= Arhopala =

Butterfly genus in family Lycaenidae

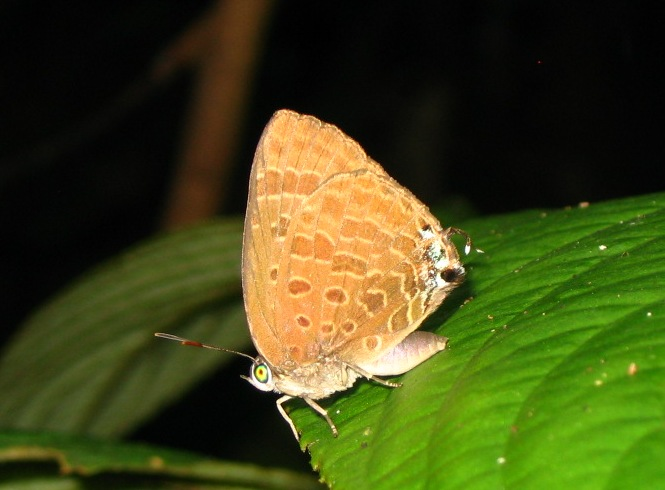
Underwing pattern of unidentified Arhopala species, Selangor on Peninsular Malaysia

Arhopala is a very large genus of gossamer-winged butterflies (Lycaenidae). They are the type genus of the tribe Arhopalini. In the relatively wide circumscription used here, it contains over 200 species collectively known as oakblues. They occur from Japan throughout temperate to tropical Asia south and east of the Himalayas to Australia and the Solomon Islands of Melanesia. Like many of their relatives, their caterpillars are attended and protected by ants (myrmecophily). Sexual dichromatism is often prominent in adult oakblues.

The genus' delimitation versus Amblypodia and Flos has proven to be problematic; not all issues are resolved and the assignment of species to these genera must be considered somewhat provisional.

== Systematics ==
As circumscribed here, this genus includes many formerly independent genera. Junior synonyms of Arhopala are:

- Acesina Moore, 1884
- Aurea Evans, 1957
- Daranasa Moore, 1884 (lapsus)
- Darasana Moore, 1884
- "Iois" Doherty, 1899 (nomen nudum)
- Narathura Moore, 1879
- Nilasera Moore, 1881
- Panchala Moore, 1882
- Satadra Moore, 1884

The species have been provisionally sorted into groups of presumed closest relatives, but many species remain insufficiently studied even for such a preliminary assessment at present. For example, A. phryxus – the type species used by Jean Baptiste Boisduval when he described Arhopala in 1832 – was established at the same time as and specifically for this genus. It is considered to be a valid species of unclear affiliations, but it is suspected that Boisduval's taxon is a junior synonym of A. thamyras – the namesake of its species group – which had been described as Papilio thamyras by Carl Linnaeus already in 1764.

Molecular phylogenetic studies have only sampled a fraction of the known diversity of oakblues, but as it seems at least some of the groups represent clades that could justifiably be treated as subgenera. It is also to be seen, however, if the genus is monophyletic in the loose sense as used here, or would need to be split up again.

=== Species ===
Species are listed alphabetically, while the groups are listed in the presumed phylogenetic sequence:

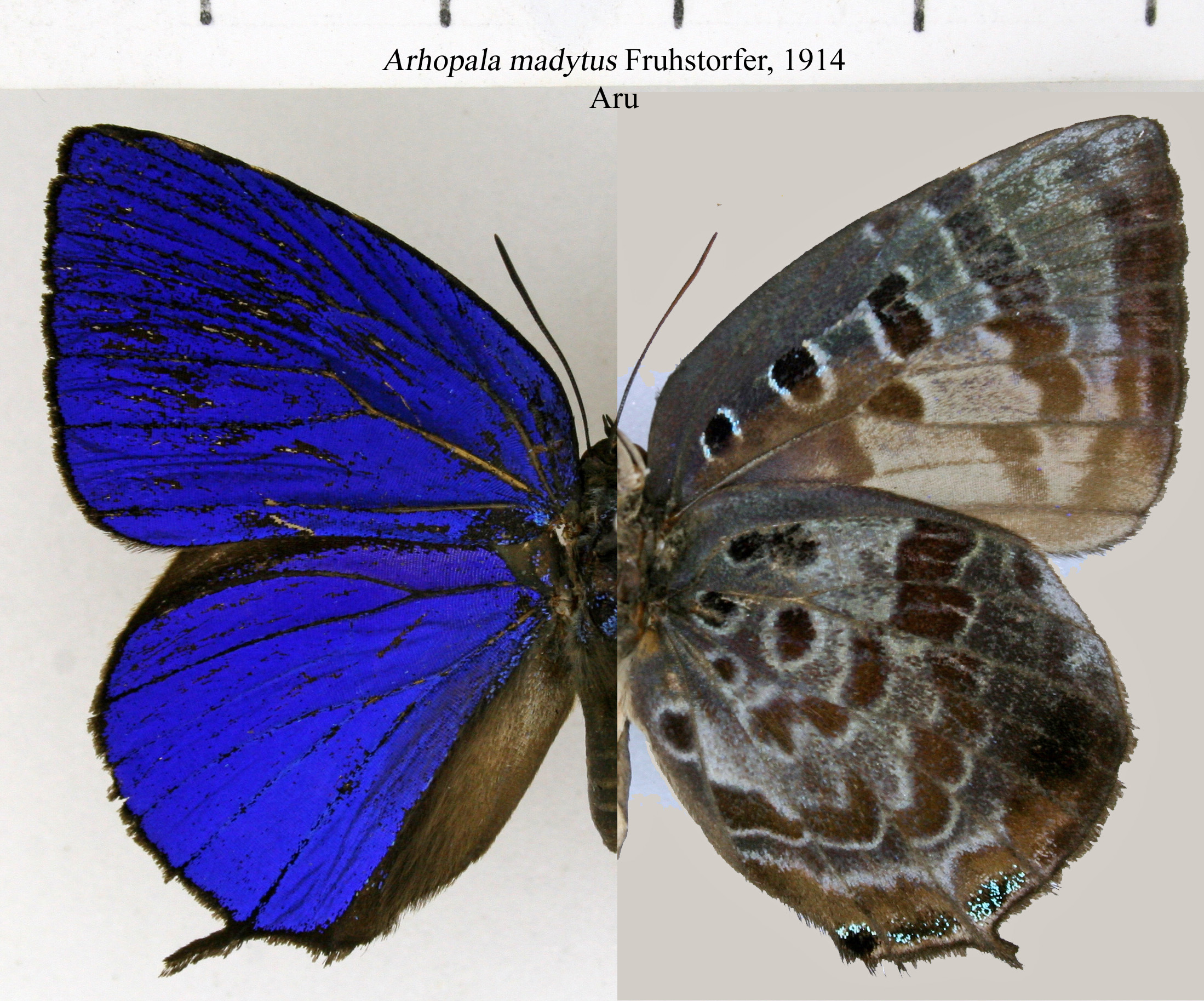
Bright oakblue (Arhopala madytus: centaurus group)

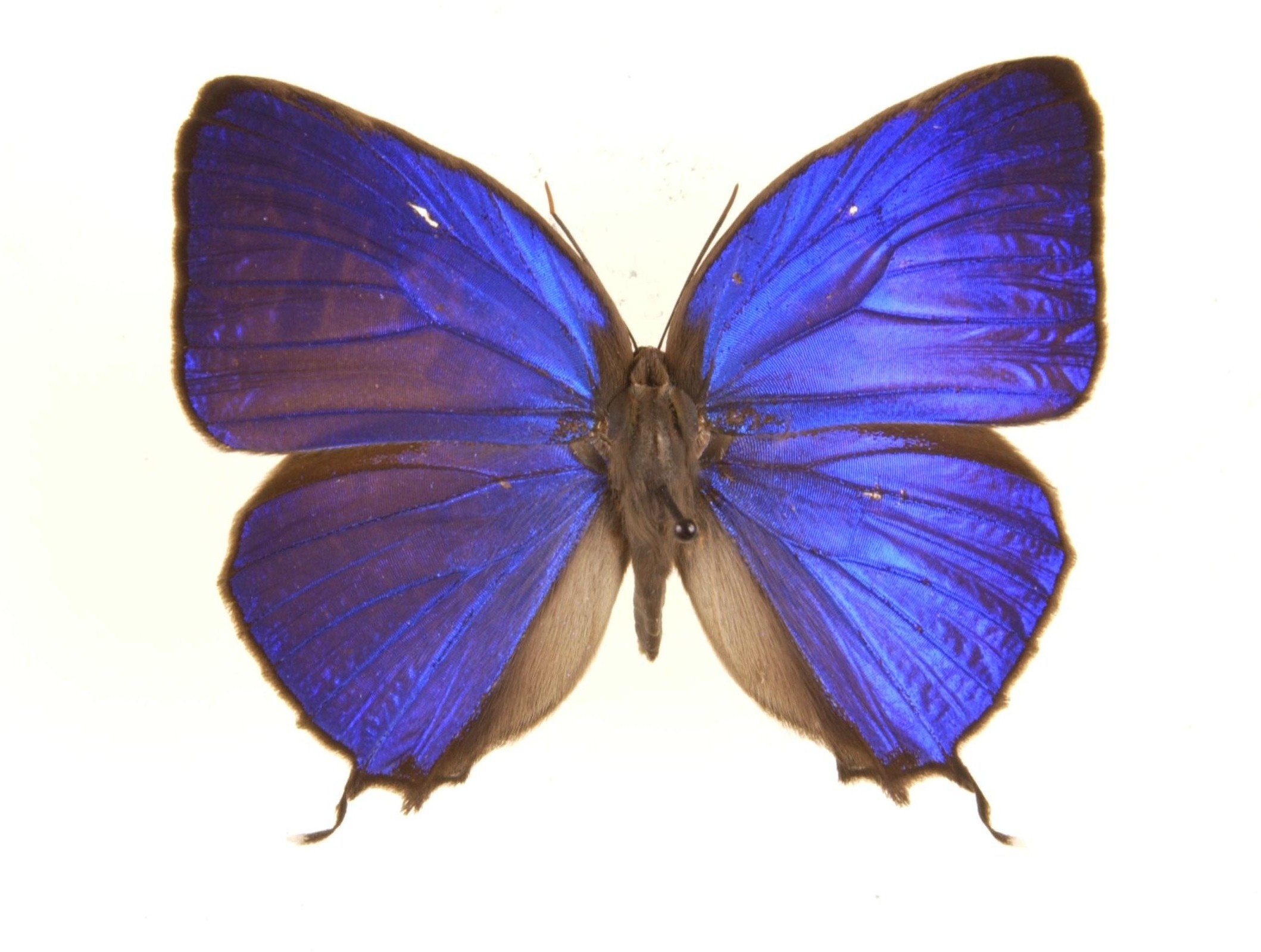
Anthelus bushblue (Arhopala anthelus: anthelus group)

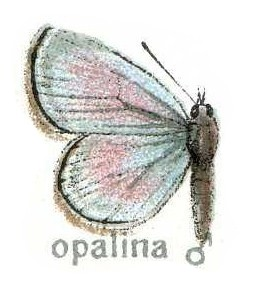
Male opal oakblue (Arhopala opalina: camdeo group)

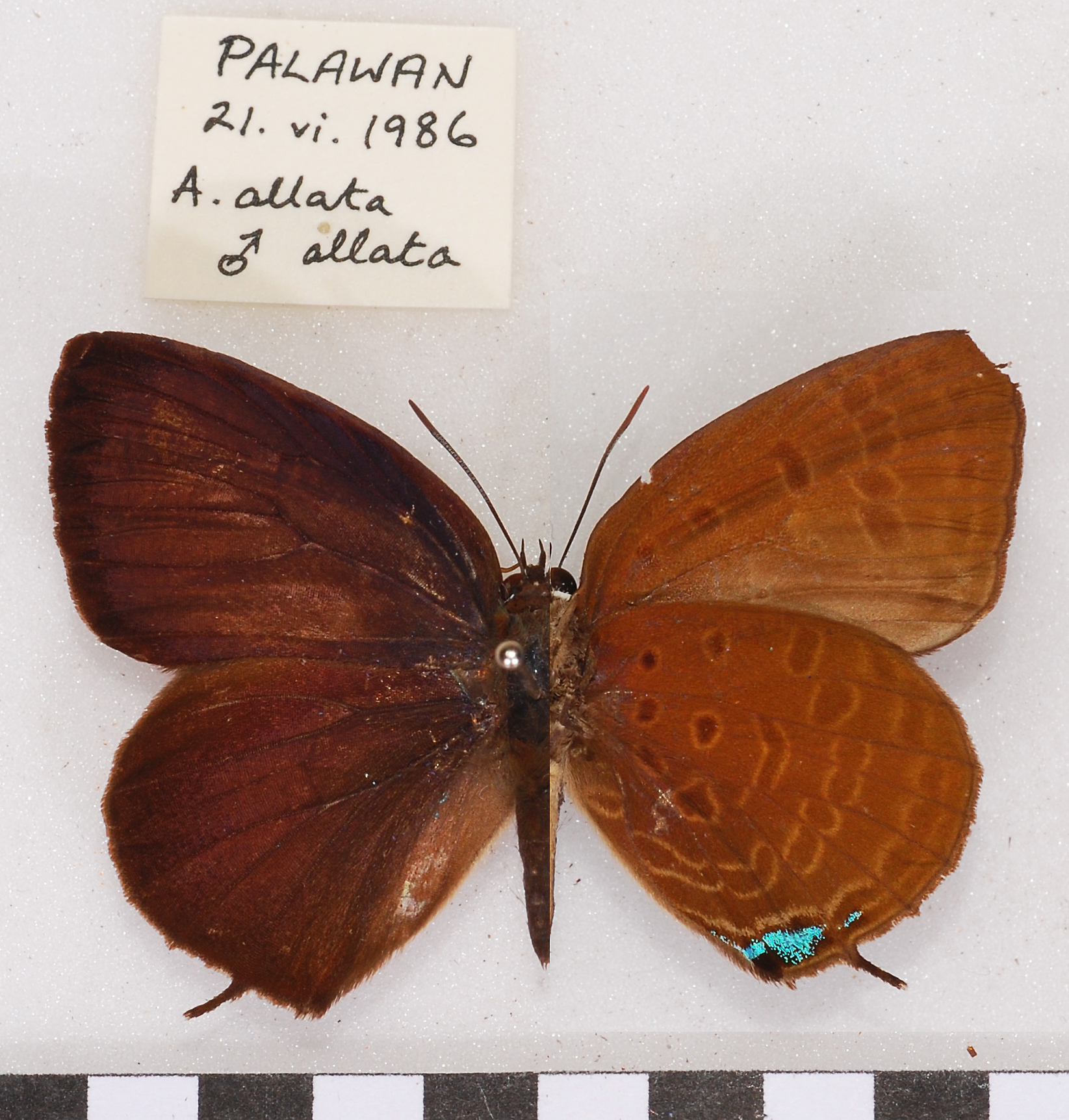
Female Tytler's rosy oakblue (Arhopala allata allata: oenea group) upperside (left) and underside

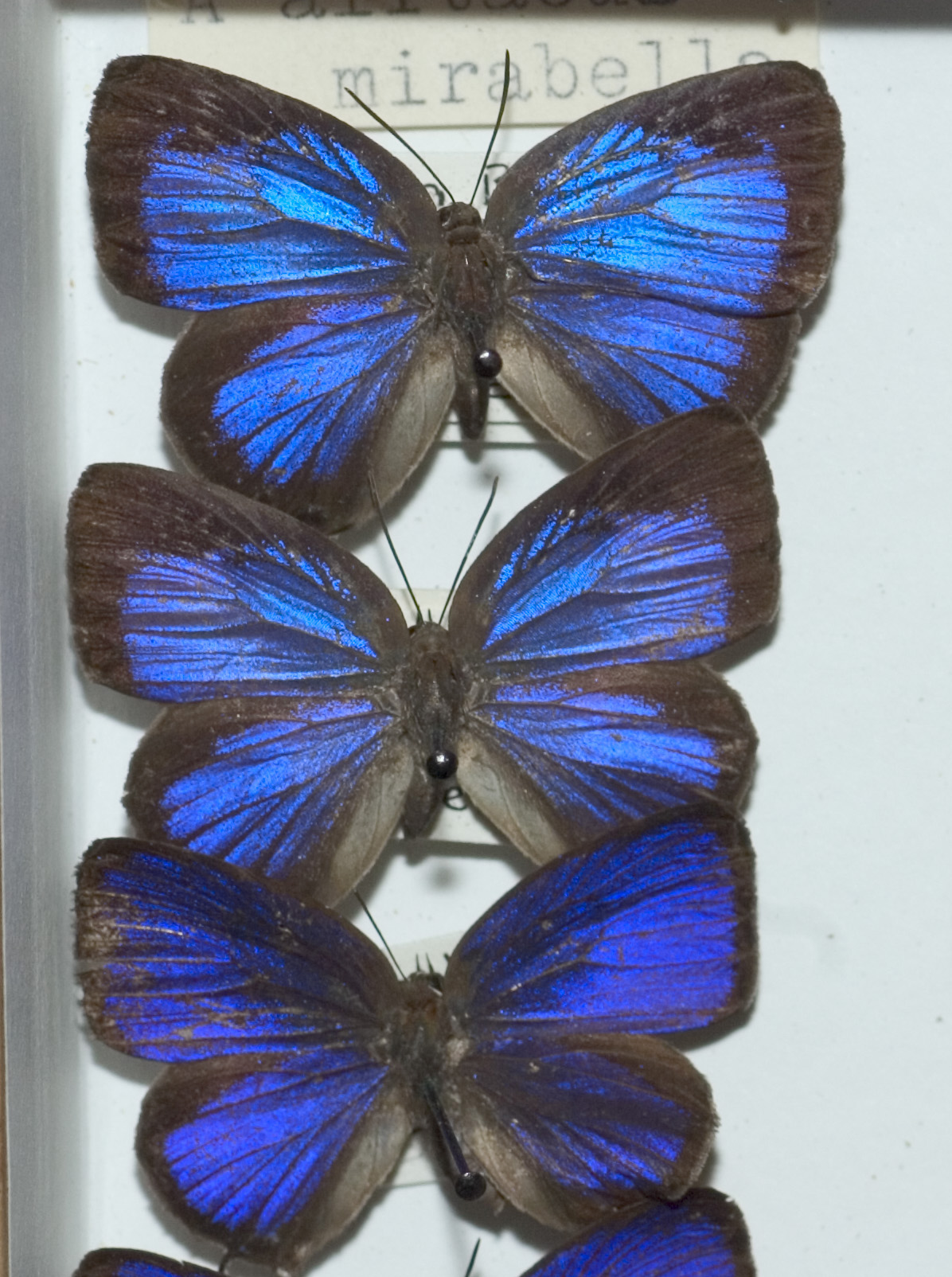
Arhopala alitaeus mirabella (alitaeus group)

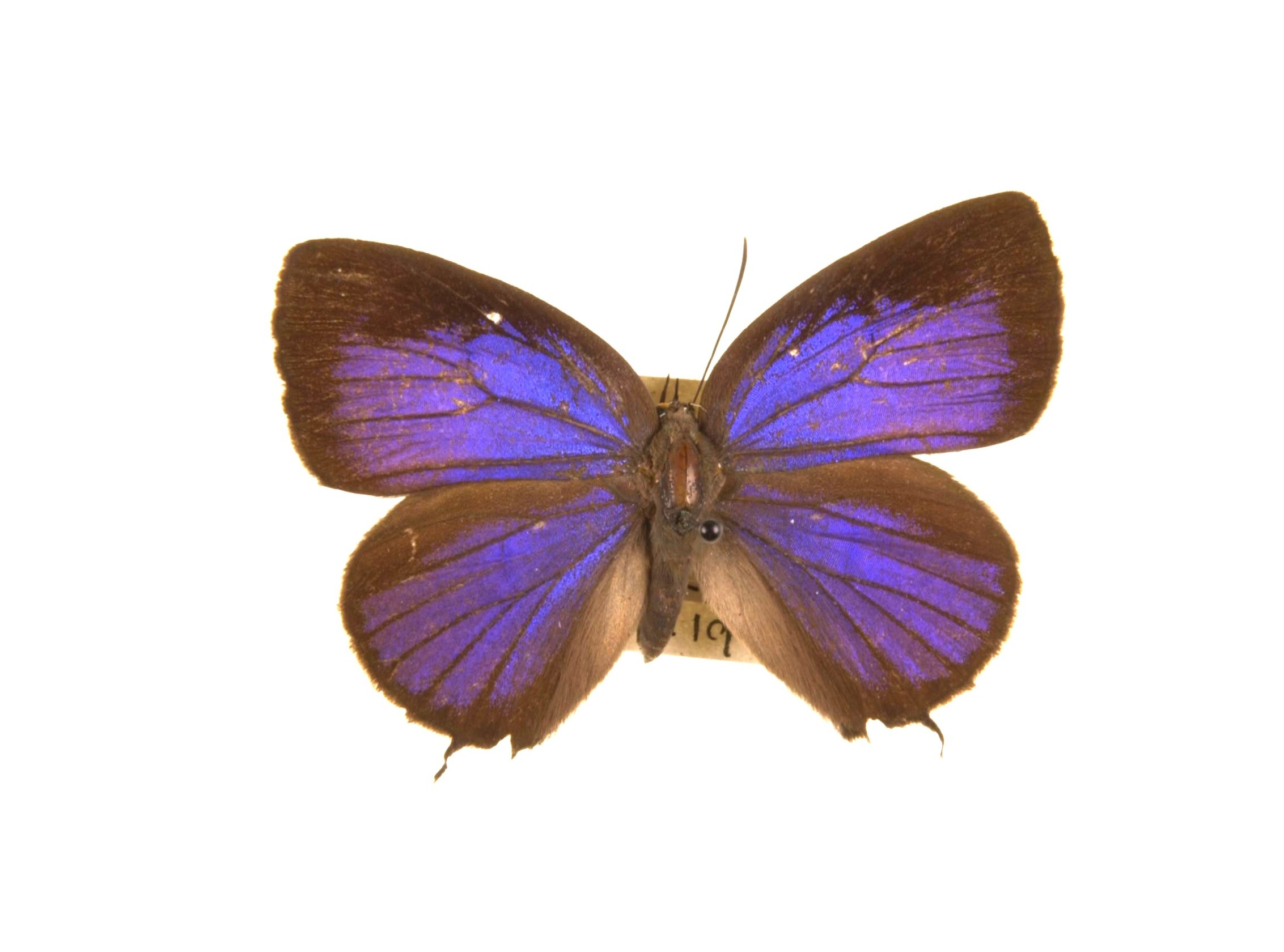
Male de Niceville's oakblue (Arhopala agrata: agrata group)

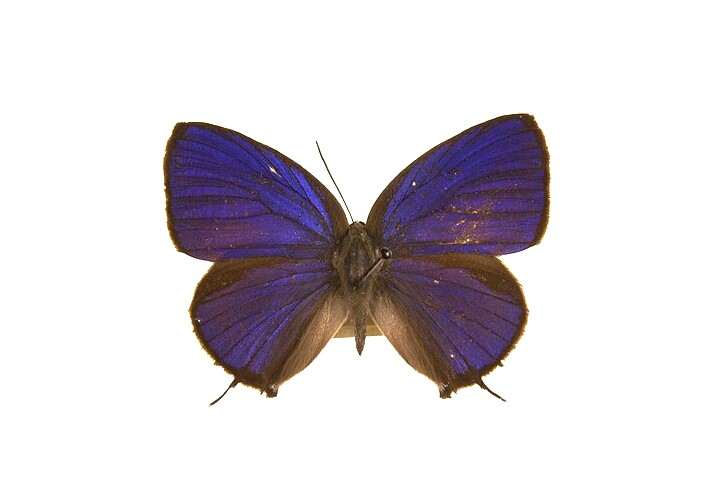
Male Sylhet oakblue (Arhopala silhetensis: cleander group)

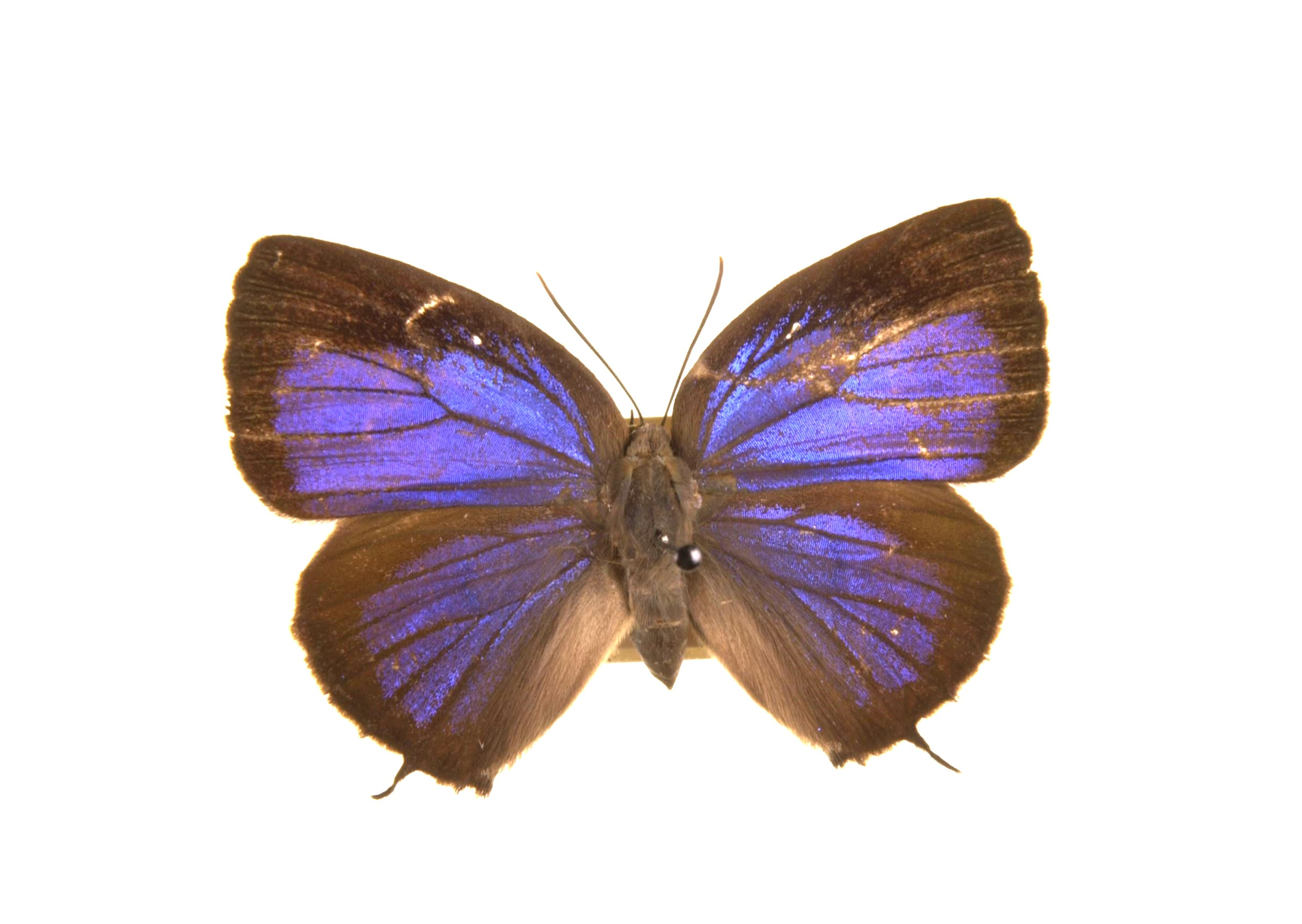
Female Arhopala horsfieldi (eumolphus group)

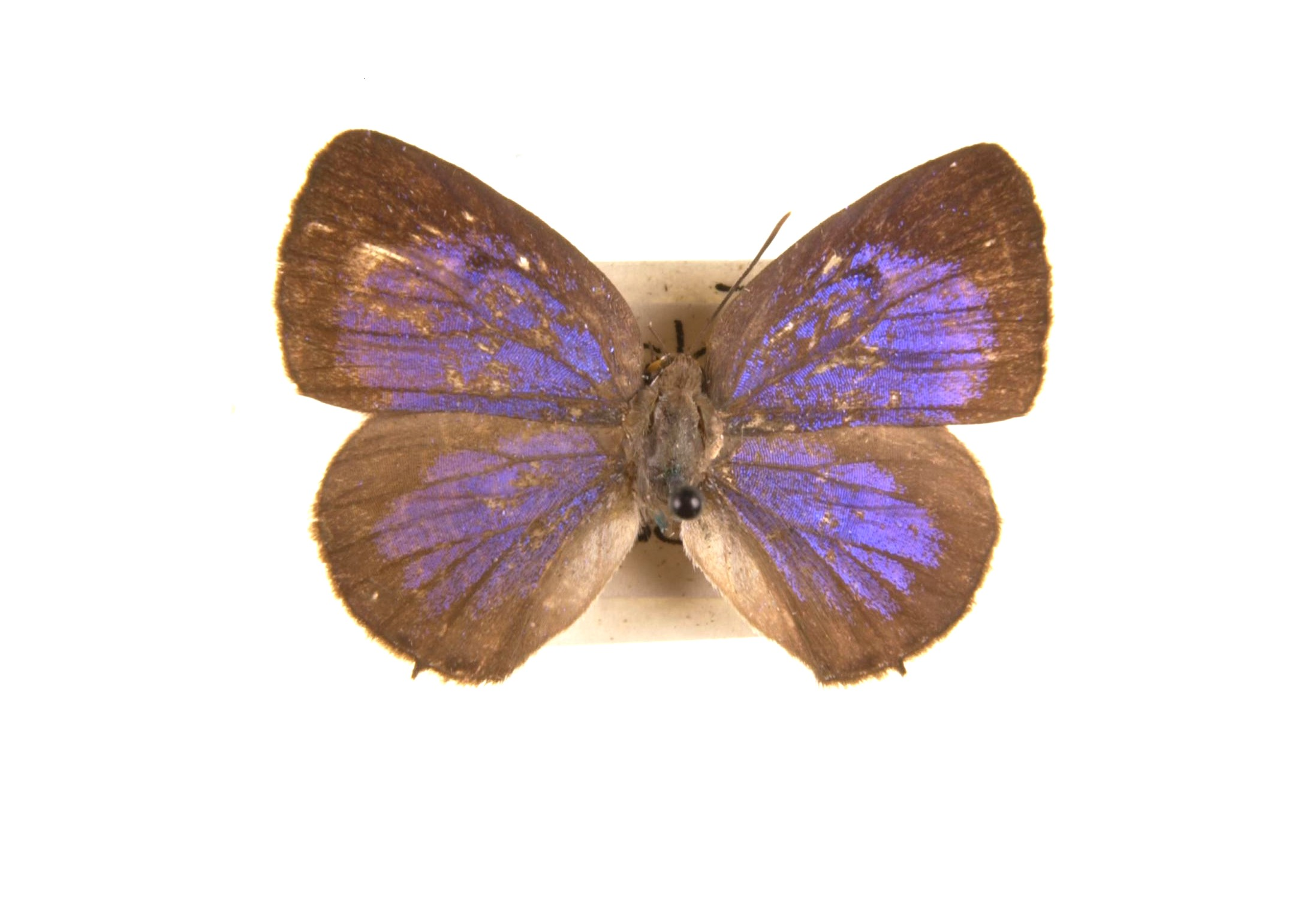
Malayan oakblue (Arhopala ammon: ganesa group)

centaurus group (subgenus Nilasera if valid)

- Arhopala acron
- Arhopala adherbal Grose-Smith, 1902
- Arhopala admete (Hewitson, 1863)
- Arhopala aexone (Hewitson, [1863])
- Arhopala alkisthenes Fruhstorfer, 1914
- Arhopala amantes – large oakblue
- Arhopala ander
- Arhopala araxes C. & R.Felder, [1865]
- Arhopala azenia
- Arhopala centaurus – centaur oakblue, dull oakblue
- Arhopala eucolpis
- Arhopala eurisus
- Arhopala kirwinii Bethune-Baker, 1903
- Arhopala leander (Evans, 1957)
- Arhopala madytus – bright oakblue
- Arhopala meander Boisduval, 1832
- Arhopala micale
- Arhopala philander C. & R.Felder, [1865]
- Arhopala sophrosyne
- Arhopala styx
- Arhopala wanda

agesias group

- Arhopala agesias (Hewitson, 1862)
- Arhopala ijanensis Bethune-Baker, 1897 (tentatively placed here)
- Arhopala kinabala Druce, 1895
- Arhopala similis Druce, 1895

anthelus group (subgenus Narathura if valid)

- Arhopala achelous (Hewitson, 1862)
- Arhopala antharita Grose-Smith, 1894
- Arhopala anthelus – anthelus bushblue
- Arhopala auxesia
- Arhopala aedias (Hewitson, 1862) (tentatively placed here)
- Arhopala hypomuta (Hewitson, 1862) (tentatively placed here)

camdeo group

- camdeo subgroup
- Arhopala anarte (Hewitson, 1862) – magnificent oakblue
- Arhopala belphoebe Doherty, 1889
- Arhopala camdana Corbet, 1941
- Arhopala camdeo (Moore, [1858]) – lilac oakblue
- Arhopala dispar Riley & Godfrey, 1921
- Arhopala hayashihisakazui Seki & Treadaway, 2013
- Arhopala hellada Fruhstorfer, 1914
- Arhopala johoreana Corbet, 1941
- Arhopala opalina – opal oakblue
- Arhopala semperi Bethune-Baker, 1896
- Arhopala varro Fruhstorfer, 1914
- myrzala subgroup
- Arhopala bazaloides – Tamil oakblue
- Arhopala myrzala (Hewitson, 1869)
- Arhopala myrzalina Corbet, 1941

oenea group

- Arhopala allata
  - Arhopala allata suffusa – Tytler's rosy oakblue
- Arhopala khamti Doherty, 1891 – Khamti oakblue, Doherty's dull oakblue
- Arhopala oenea (Hewitson, 1869) – Hewitson's oakblue

epimuta group

- Arhopala atosia (Hewitson, [1863])
- Arhopala epimuta (Moore, [1858])
- Arhopala lurida Corbet, 1941

amphimuta group

- amphimuta subgroup
  - Arhopala alica (Evans, 1957)
  - Arhopala amphimuta (C. & R.Felder, 1860)
  - Arhopala avathina Corbet, 1941
  - Arhopala baluensis Bethune-Baker, 1904
  - Arhopala dajagaka Bethune-Baker, 1896
  - Arhopala delta (Evans, 1957)
  - Arhopala inornata (C. & R.Felder, 1860) (tentatively placed here)
  - Arhopala kurzi (Distant, 1885)
  - Arhopala major (Staudinger, 1889)
  - Arhopala moolaiana (Moore, [1879])
  - Arhopala norda (Evans, 1957)
  - Arhopala sceva Bethune-Baker, 1903
  - Arhopala stubbsi Eliot, 1962
  - Arhopala zylda Corbet, 1941
- muta subgroup
  - Arhopala moorei Bethune-Baker, 1896
  - Arhopala muta (Hewitson, 1862)
  - Arhopala tropaea Corbet, 1941
- perimuta subgroup (subgenus Darasana if valid)
  - Arhopala antimuta C. & R.Felder, [1865]
  - Arhopala metamuta (Hewitson, [1863])
  - Arhopala perimuta (Moore, [1858]) – yellow-disk tailless oakblue

agesilaus group

- Arhopala agesilaus (Staudinger, 1889)
- Arhopala avatha de Nicéville, [1896]
- Arhopala democritus (Fabricius, 1793) (tentatively placed here)

alitaeus group

- Arhopala aida de Nicéville, 1889
- Arhopala alitaeus
- Arhopala ariana (Evans, [1925])
- Arhopala arianaga Corbet, 1941
- Arhopala denta (Evans, 1957)
- Arhopala elopura Druce, 1894
- Arhopala havilandi Bethune-Baker, 1896
- Arhopala pseudomuta (Staudinger, 1889)
- Arhopala sintanga Corbet, 1948

agrata group

- Arhopala ace de Nicéville, [1893] – Tytler's oakblue
- Arhopala agrata – de Niceville's oakblue
- Arhopala azinis de Nicéville, [1896]

cleander group

- cleander subgroup
  - Arhopala aruana (Evans, 1957)
  - Arhopala ate (Hewitson, 1863)
  - Arhopala athada (Staudinger, 1889)
  - Arhopala cleander (C.Felder, 1860)
  - Arhopala silhetensis – Sylhet oakblue
  - Arhopala zambra Swinhoe, [1911]
- alea subgroup
  - Arhopala aenigma Eliot, 1972
  - Arhopala agaba – purple-glazed oakblue
  - Arhopala alea – rosy oakblue
  - Arhopala aroa (Hewitson, [1863])
  - Arhopala aurelia (Evans, [1925])
  - Arhopala evansi Corbet, 1941
  - Arhopala milleri Corbet, 1941
  - Arhopala normani Eliot, 1972
  - Arhopala phaenops C. & R.Felder, [1865] (including A. detrita)
  - Arhopala phanda Corbet, 1941
  - Arhopala ralanda Corbet, 1941
  - Arhopala selta (Hewitson, 1869)
  - Arhopala sublustris Bethune-Baker, 1904
  - Arhopala vihara (C. & R. Felder, 1860) (tentatively placed here)

eumolphus group

- Arhopala acta (Evans, 1957)
- Arhopala asma
- Arhopala bazalus – powdered oakblue
- Arhopala chamaeleona Bethune-Baker, 1903
- Arhopala corinda (Hewitson, 1869) (tentatively placed here)
- Arhopala critala
- Arhopala eumolphus – green oakblue
- Arhopala florinda
- Arhopala hellenore Doherty, 1889 – Doherty's green oakblue
- Arhopala horsfieldi
- Arhopala irma Fruhstorfer, 1914
- Arhopala nobilis (Felder, 1860)
- Arhopala overdijkinki Corbet, 1941
- Arhopala pagenstecheri
- Arhopala tameanga Bethune-Baker, 1896
- Arhopala wildei

rama group

- Arhopala arvina (Hewitson, [1863]) – purple-brown tailless oakblue
- Arhopala buddha Bethune-Baker, 1903
- Arhopala paralea – glazed oakblue
- Arhopala rama – dark Himalayan oakblue

agelastus group

- Arhopala agelastus (Hewitson, 1862)
- Arhopala alaconia (Hewitson, 1869)
- Arhopala alesia – pallid oakblue
- Arhopala barami Bethune-Baker, 1903
- Arhopala cardoni Corbet, 1941
- Arhopala epimete (Staudinger, 1889)
- Arhopala labuana Bethune-Baker, 1896
- Arhopala wildeyana Corbet, 1941

fulla group

- Arhopala disparilis
- Arhopala fulla (Hewitson, 1862) – spotless oakblue

aurea group (subgenus Aurea if valid)

- Arhopala aurea (Hewitson, 1862)
- Arhopala borneensis Bethune-Baker, 1896
- Arhopala caeca (Hewitson, [1863])
- Arhopala stinga (Evans, 1957)
- Arhopala trogon (Distant, 1884)

ganesa group (subgenus Panchala if valid)

- Arhopala ammon – Malayan oakblue
- Arhopala ammonides (Doherty, 1891)
- Arhopala ariel (Doherty, 1891)
- Arhopala elizabethae (Eliot, 1959)
- Arhopala ganesa – tailless bushblue
- Arhopala paraganesa (de Nicéville, 1882) – dusky bushblue
- Arhopala tomokoae (H. Hayashi, 1976)

abseus group

- Arhopala abseus – aberrant oakblue, aberrant bushblue
- Arhopala anella de Nicéville, [1895]

thamyras group

- Arhopala arta
- Arhopala axina
- Arhopala axiothea
- Arhopala doreena
- Arhopala helianthes
- Arhopala thamyras (Linnaeus, 1764)

hercules group

- Arhopala hercules (Hewitson, 1862)
- Arhopala herculina Staudinger, 1888
- Arhopala leo
- Arhopala sophilus
- Arhopala tyrannus

Incertae sedis

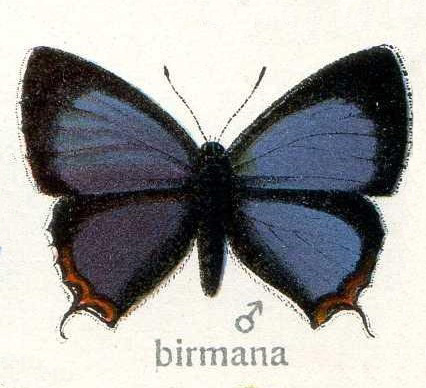
Male Burmese bushblue (Arhopala birmana)

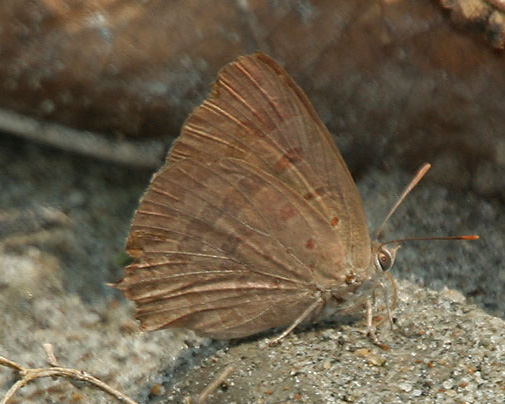
Hooked oakblue (Arhopala paramuta)

- Arhopala aberrans (de Nicéville, [1889]) – pale bushblue
- Arhopala acetes
- Arhopala aeeta de Nicéville, [1893]
- Arhopala alax – silky oakblue
- Arhopala alexandrae Schröder & Treadaway, 1978
- Arhopala anamuta Semper, 1890
- Arhopala annulata (Felder, 1860)
- Arhopala argentea Staudinger, 1888
- Arhopala aronya (Hewitson, 1869)
- Arhopala arsenius (C. & R.Felder, [1865])
- Arhopala asinarus C. & R.Felder, [1865]
- Arhopala asopia (Hewitson, [1869]) – plain tailless oakblue
- Arhopala atrax – dark broken-band oakblue, Indian oakblue (type species of Satadra)
- Arhopala bella Bethune-Baker, 1896
- Arhopala birmana – Burmese bushblue
- Arhopala brooksiana Corbet, 1941
- Arhopala canaraica (Moore, 1884)
- Arhopala comica de Nicéville, 1900 – comic oakblue
- Arhopala curiosa (Evans, 1957)
- Arhopala davaona Semper, 1890
- Arhopala dodonaea – pale Himalayan oakblue
- Arhopala dohertyi Bethune-Baker, 1903
- Arhopala ellisi Evans, 1914 – Ellis's bushblue
- Arhopala eridanus
- Arhopala grandimuta Seki, 1993
- Arhopala halma
- Arhopala halmaheira
- Arhopala hellenoroides Chou & Gu, 1994
- Arhopala hesba (Hewitson, 1869)
- Arhopala hinigugma Takanami, 1985
- Arhopala hylander
- Arhopala ilocana Osada & Hashimoto, 1987
- Arhopala irregularis Bethune-Baker, 1903
- Arhopala japonica – Japanese oakblue
- Arhopala lata (Evans, 1957)
- Arhopala luzonensis Takanami & Ballantine, 1987
- Arhopala matsutaroi (H. Hayashi, 1979)
- Arhopala mindanensis
- Arhopala mizunumai
- Arhopala myrtha (Staudinger, 1889)
- Arhopala nakamotoi
- Arhopala nicevillei Bethune-Baker, 1903
- Arhopala ocrida (Hewitson, 1869)
- Arhopala ormistoni – Ormiston's oakblue
- Arhopala pabihira
- Arhopala paramuta – hooked oakblue
- Arhopala phryxus Boisduval, 1832
- Arhopala pseudovihara (H. Hayashi, 1981)
- Arhopala qiongdaoensis Chou & Gu, 1994
- Arhopala quercoides
- Arhopala rudepoema Seki, [1995]
- Arhopala sakaguchii (H. Hayashi, 1981)
- Arhopala sangira Bethune-Baker, 1897
- Arhopala schroederi
- Arhopala siabra
- Arhopala simoni Schröder & Treadaway, 1999
- Arhopala singla (de Nicéville, 1885) – yellow-disk oakblue
- Arhopala staudingeri Semper, 1890
- Arhopala straatmani
- Arhopala tephlis
- Arhopala theba (Hewitson, [1863])
- Arhopala tindongani Nuyda & Takanami, 1990
- Arhopala trionaea Semper, 1890 (camdeo group?)
- Arhopala weelii
- Arhopala zeta
