= Arhopala wanda =

Scientific classification
- Kingdom: Animalia
- Phylum: Arthropoda
- Clade: Pancrustacea
- Class: Insecta
- Order: Lepidoptera
- Family: Lycaenidae
- Genus: Arhopala
- Species: A. wanda

Binomial name
- Arhopala wanda (Evans, 1957)

Synonyms
- Narathura wanda Evans, 1957

Species of butterfly

Arhopala wanda is a butterfly in the family Lycaenidae. It was described by William Harry Evans in 1957. It is found in Wandesi, Western New Guinea.
