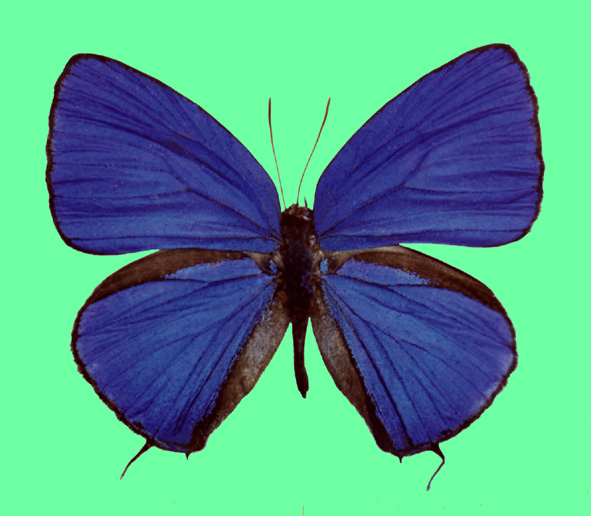
- Male upperside
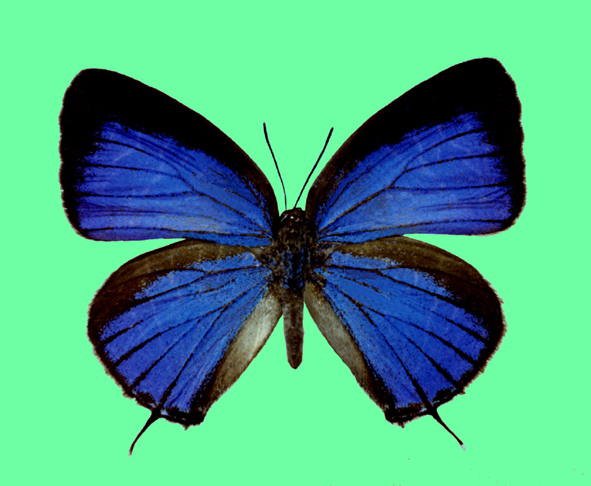
- Female upperside

Scientific classification
- Kingdom: Animalia
- Phylum: Arthropoda
- Clade: Pancrustacea
- Class: Insecta
- Order: Lepidoptera
- Family: Lycaenidae
- Genus: Arhopala
- Species: A. matsutaroi

Binomial name
- Arhopala matsutaroi H. Hayashi, 1979

= Arhopala matsutaroi =

Species of butterfly

Arhopala matsutaroi is a butterfly of the family Lycaenidae first described by Hisakazu Hayashi in 1979. Its forewing length is 19 mm (0.75 in). It is endemic to the Philippines. It is uncommon and found only on Mindanao.

Etymology: The specific name is dedicated to Matsutaro Hayashi, the father of the author.
