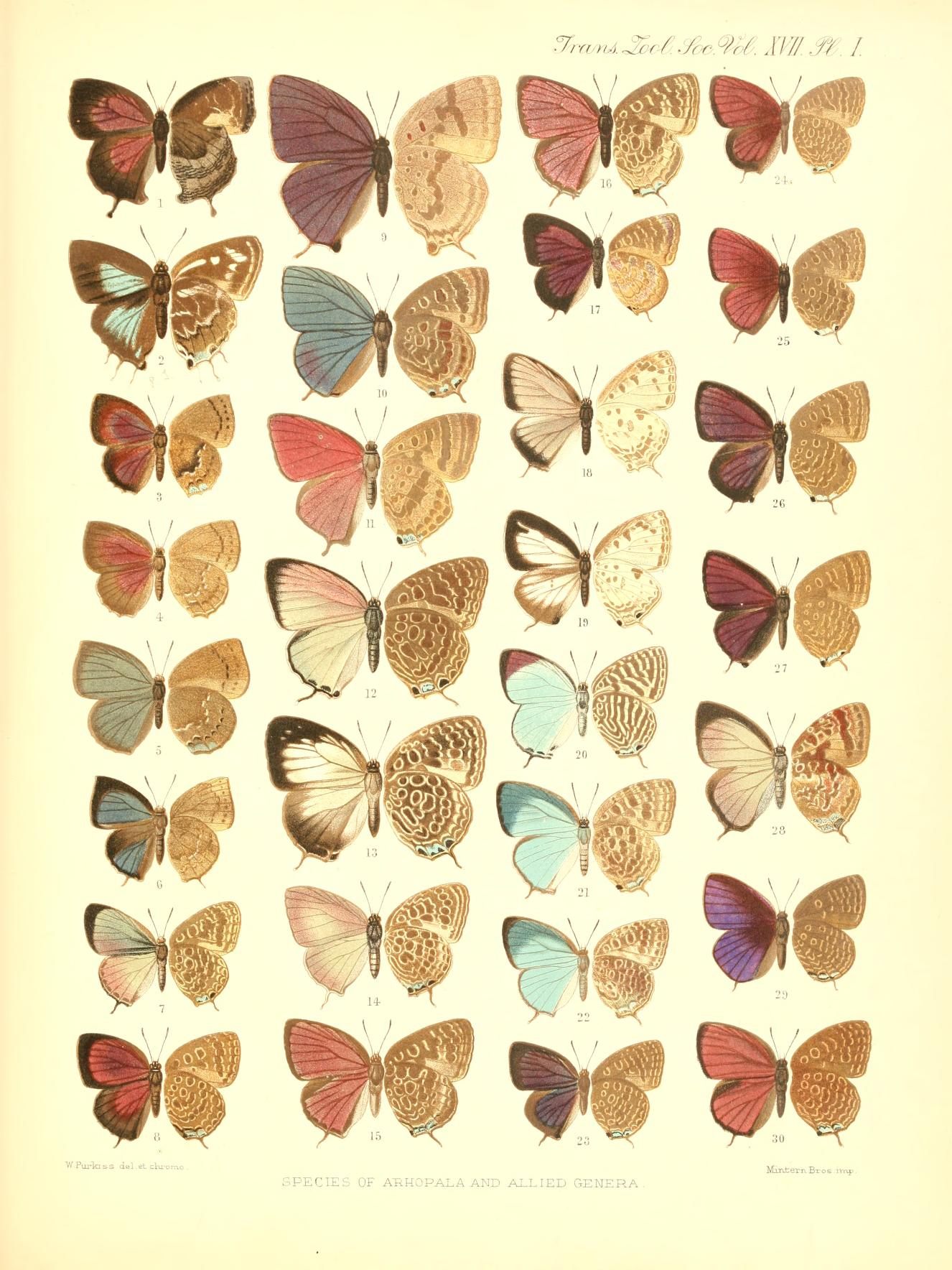
- Arhopala myrtha in Bethune Baker

Scientific classification
- Kingdom: Animalia
- Phylum: Arthropoda
- Clade: Pancrustacea
- Class: Insecta
- Order: Lepidoptera
- Family: Lycaenidae
- Genus: Arhopala
- Species: A. myrtha

Binomial name
- Arhopala myrtha (Staudinger, 1889)

= Arhopala myrtha =

Species of butterfly

Arhopala myrtha is a butterfly in the family Lycaenidae. It was described by Otto Staudinger in 1889. It is found in the Indomalayan realm where it is endemic to Palawan.

== Description ==
A. myrtha Stgr. represents alitaeus in Palawan; the specimens are small, beneath very regularly marked, the black marginal band of the upper surface near the apex in the male more than 4 mm broad, at the narrowest place (above the tornus) still 2.5 mm broad, in the female even broader. The upper surface of the male is of a bright ultramarine-blue colour and shows an intense gloss in a certain light.
