= Arhopala ilocana =

Scientific classification
- Kingdom: Animalia
- Phylum: Arthropoda
- Class: Insecta
- Order: Lepidoptera
- Family: Lycaenidae
- Genus: Arhopala
- Species: A. ilocana

Binomial name
- Arhopala ilocana Osada and Hashimoto, 1987

Synonyms
- Arhopala natsumiae

Species of butterfly

Arhopala ilocana is a butterfly in the family Lycaenidae. It was discovered by Shilo Osada and Satoshi Hashimoto in 1987. It is found in Luzon. This species is monotypic.
