= Arhopala simoni =

Scientific classification
- Kingdom: Animalia
- Phylum: Arthropoda
- Class: Insecta
- Order: Lepidoptera
- Family: Lycaenidae
- Subfamily: Theclinae
- Tribe: Arhopalini
- Genus: Arhopala
- Species: A. simoni

Binomial name
- Arhopala simoni Schröder & Treadaway, 1999

Species of butterfly

Arhopala simoni is a butterfly in the family Lycaenidae. It was discovered by Heinz-Gerd Schröder and Colin Guy Treadaway in 1999. It is found on Tawitawi Island. This species is monotypic.
