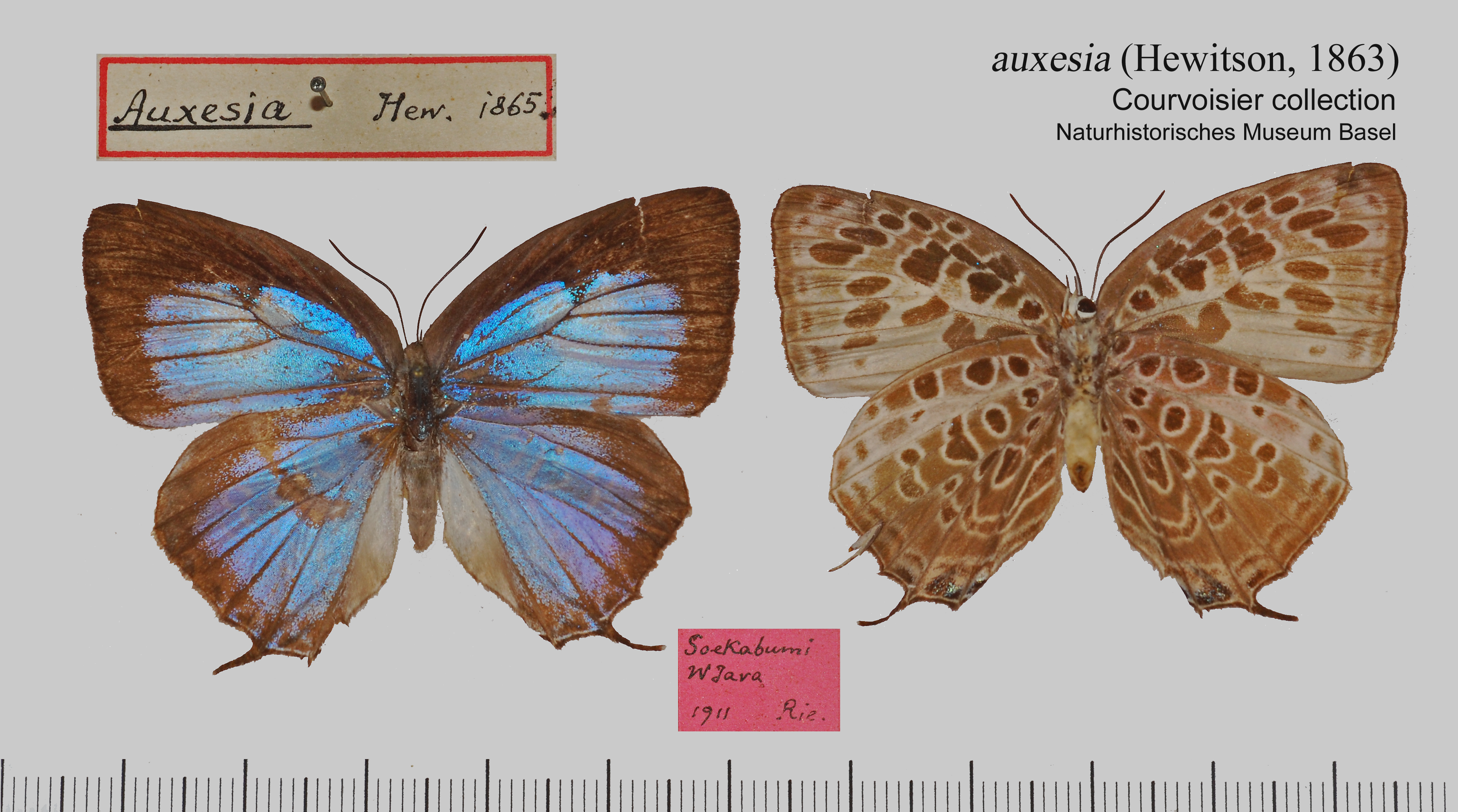
- From the Courvoisier Collection, Basel, Switzerland

Scientific classification
- Kingdom: Animalia
- Phylum: Arthropoda
- Clade: Pancrustacea
- Class: Insecta
- Order: Lepidoptera
- Family: Lycaenidae
- Genus: Arhopala
- Species: A. auxesia

Binomial name
- Arhopala auxesia (Hewitson, 1863)

Synonyms
- Amblypodia auxesia Hewitson, 1863; Narathura auxesia salvia Evans, 1957

= Arhopala auxesia =

Species of butterfly

Arhopala auxesia is a butterfly in the family Lycaenidae. It was described by William Chapman Hewitson in 1863. It is found in New Guinea and Sumatra. The upper surface of the male is of a bright light bluish-green with a broad dark marginal band, the female dark violettish-blue, with a still broader margin. Beneath distinguished by the spots of the hindwing being also very prominently dark brown.

== Subspecies ==
- A. a. auxesia (New Guinea, Sumatra)
- A. a. salvia (Evans, 1957) (Salawati, Noemfoor Island)
