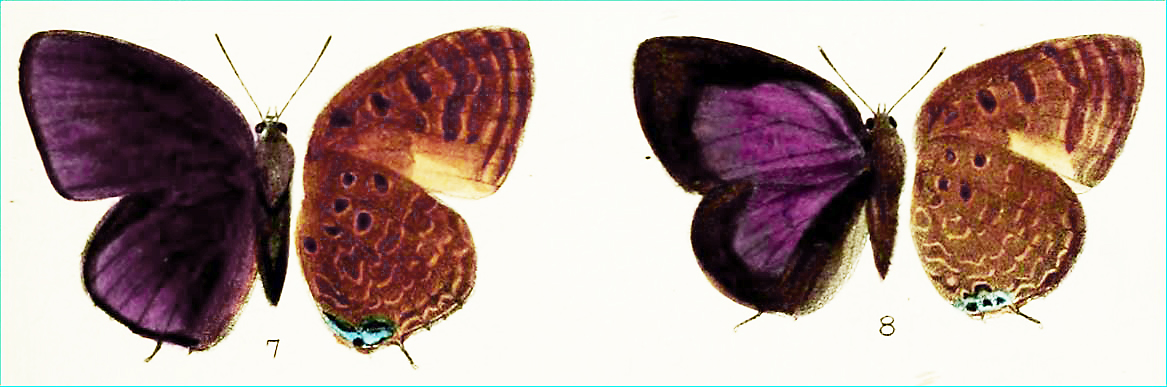
- Arhopala tameanga male, female from original description

Scientific classification
- Kingdom: Animalia
- Phylum: Arthropoda
- Clade: Pancrustacea
- Class: Insecta
- Order: Lepidoptera
- Family: Lycaenidae
- Genus: Arhopala
- Species: A. tameanga

Binomial name
- Arhopala tameanga Bethune-Baker, 1896

= Arhopala tameanga =

Species of butterfly

Arhopala tameanga is a butterfly in the family Lycaenidae. It was described by George Thomas Bethune-Baker in 1896. It is found in the Indomalayan realm where it is endemic to Borneo.

The dark lilac upper surface almost black with a deep blue reflection with a lilac gloss in the disc of the wing; the female with a very broad blackish-brown marginal band; the postmedian transverse band on the forewing beneath is only flawed in the centre, not broken through.
