= Arhopala hinigugma =

Scientific classification
- Kingdom: Animalia
- Phylum: Arthropoda
- Class: Insecta
- Order: Lepidoptera
- Family: Lycaenidae
- Genus: Arhopala
- Species: A. hinigugma

Binomial name
- Arhopala hinigugma Takanami, 1985

Species of butterfly

Arhopala hinigugma is a butterfly in the family Lycaenidae. It was discovered by Yusuke Takanami in 1985. It is found in Mindanao. This species is monotypic.
