= Arhopala luzonensis =

Scientific classification
- Kingdom: Animalia
- Phylum: Arthropoda
- Class: Insecta
- Order: Lepidoptera
- Family: Lycaenidae
- Genus: Arhopala
- Species: A. luzonensis

Binomial name
- Arhopala luzonensis Takanami and Ballantine, 1987

Species of butterfly

Arhopala luzonensis is a butterfly in the family Lycaenidae. It was discovered by Yusuke Takanami and Alistair Ballantine in 1987. It is found in Luzon. This species is monotypic.

== Description ==
The male is deep violet above with a border of 4 millimeters. The underside is dark yellowish brown with the darker spots palely edged. The female resembles the male, but it is paler violet above.
