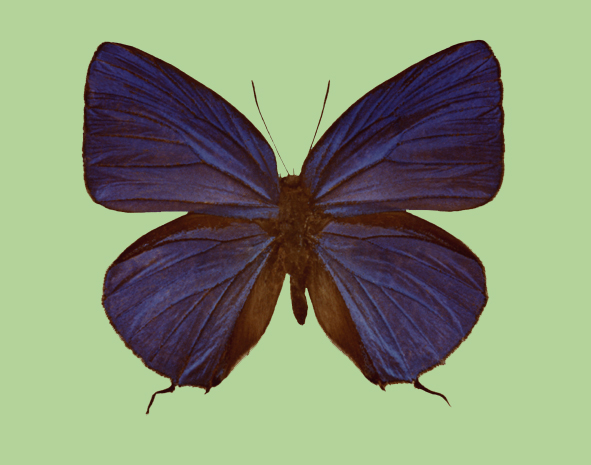
- Male upperside
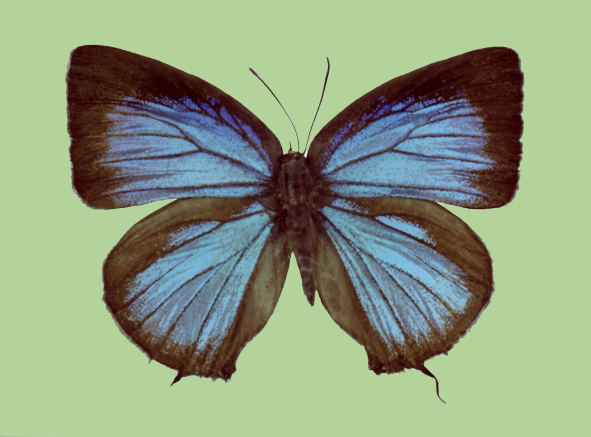
- Female upperside

Scientific classification
- Kingdom: Animalia
- Phylum: Arthropoda
- Clade: Pancrustacea
- Class: Insecta
- Order: Lepidoptera
- Family: Lycaenidae
- Genus: Arhopala
- Species: A. sakaguchii

Binomial name
- Arhopala sakaguchii H. Hayashi, 1981

= Arhopala sakaguchii =

Species of butterfly

Arhopala sakaguchii is a butterfly of the family Lycaenidae first described by Hisakazu Hayashi in 1981. It is found on the Philippine islands of Negros and Mindoro.

The specific name is dedicated to Dr. Kohei SAKAGUCHI, professor emeritus of Kyoto University.
