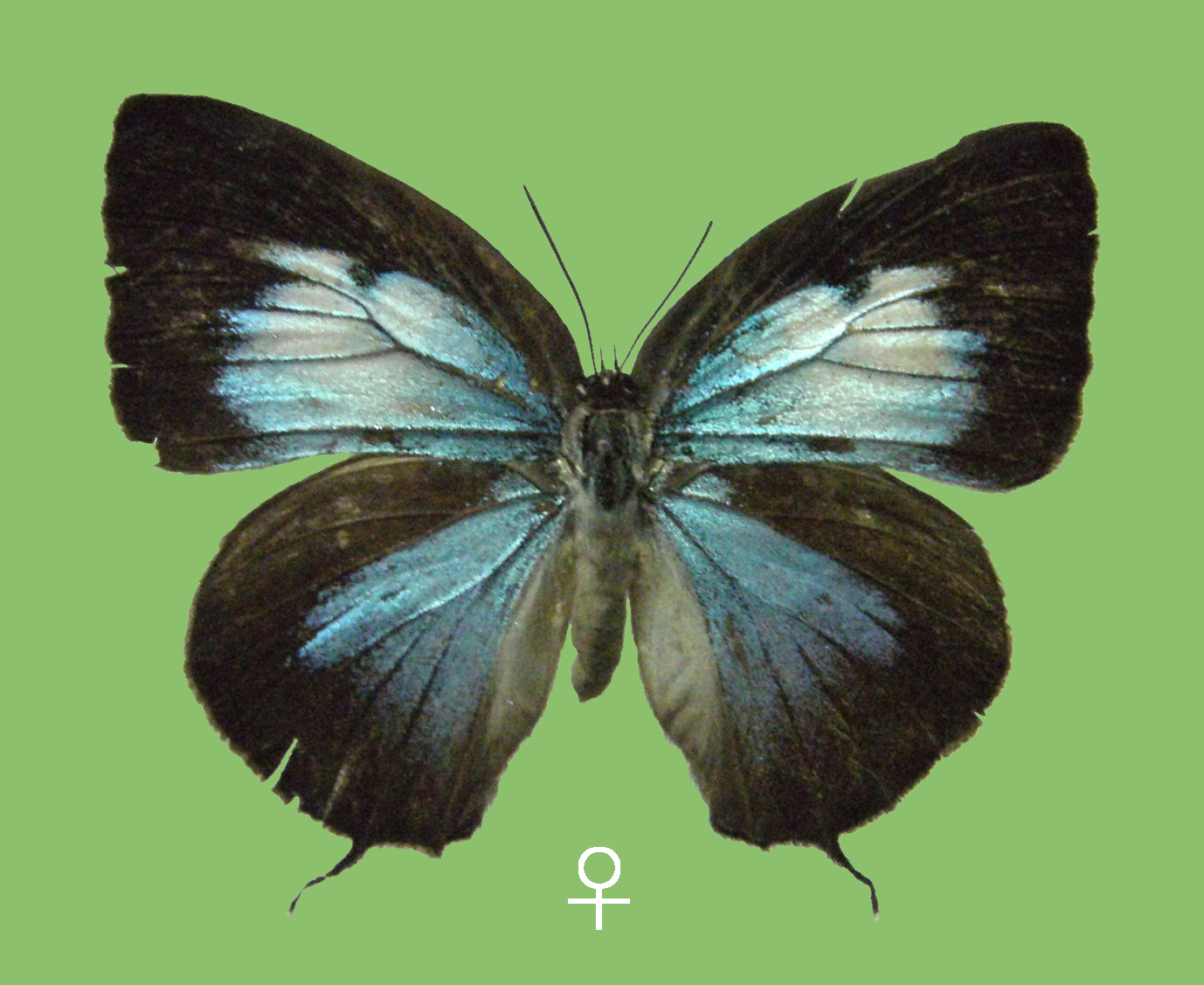
- Female upperside
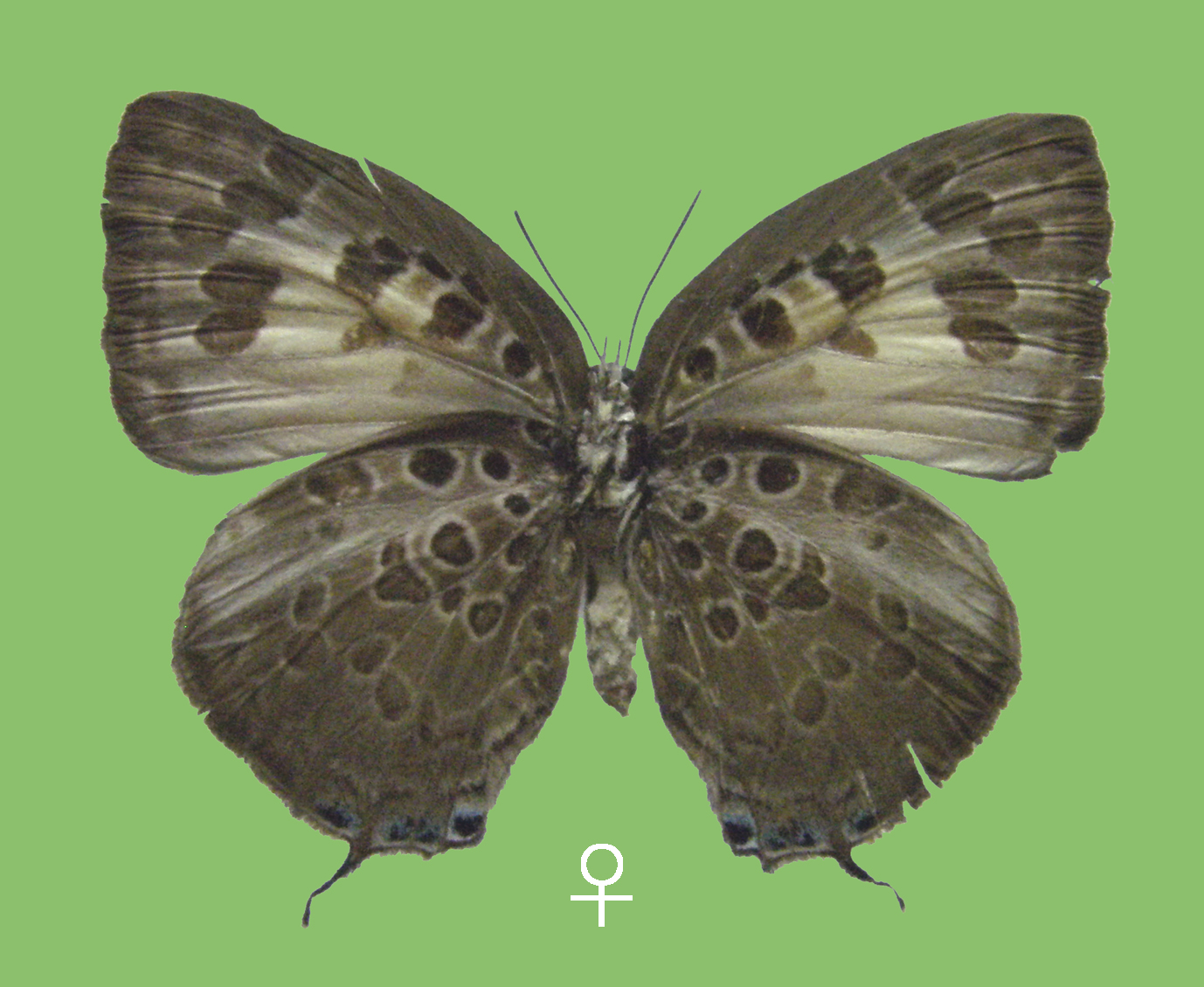
- Female underside

Scientific classification
- Kingdom: Animalia
- Phylum: Arthropoda
- Clade: Pancrustacea
- Class: Insecta
- Order: Lepidoptera
- Family: Lycaenidae
- Genus: Arhopala
- Species: A. hayashihisakazui

Binomial name
- Arhopala hayashihisakazui Seki & Treadaway, 2013

= Arhopala hayashihisakazui =

Species of butterfly

Arhopala hayashihisakazui is a butterfly of the family Lycaenidae. It is endemic to northeastern Luzon in the Philippines. This species is large with a forewing length of 33.5 mm and wingspan of 60 mm. This species is quite distinct and easily separated from other Arhopala species so far recorded from the Philippines. Outside the Philippines, the most likely confused species, especially on the underside, is Arhopala anarte distributed from Assam to Thailand, Laos through Sundaland (without Palawan). But the species is distinguished in several points:

- Both wings more quadrate.
- Upperside ground color shining pale greenish blue instead of purplish blue in subspecies anarte and tanimitsui, shining pale blue without a greenish tinge in auzea.
- Upperside black border much broader than in subspecies auzea which has the broadest border of these three subspecies of A. anarte.
- Underside ground color with a grayish tinge which does not exist in A. anarte.
- Underside forewing post discal spot in space 9 in continuation of those in spaces 4, 5 and 6 whereas in A. anarte it is shifted inwardly out of line. No spot above central cell spot in spaces 10 and 11. Basal black area in space 1b obscure and not outlined by striae whereas in anarte it is prominent and outlined by brown striae.
- Underside hindwing central spot in space 1b round whereas in anarte elongate.

Etymology. The specific name is dedicated to Japanese lepidopterist, Hisakazu HAYASHI.
