= Arhopala halma =

Scientific classification
- Kingdom: Animalia
- Phylum: Arthropoda
- Class: Insecta
- Order: Lepidoptera
- Family: Lycaenidae
- Genus: Arhopala
- Species: A. halma

Binomial name
- Arhopala halma Evans, 1957

Synonyms
- Narathura halma

Species of butterfly

Arhopala halma is a butterfly in the family Lycaenidae. It was discovered by William Harry Evans in 1957. It is found on Halmahera. This species is monotypic.

== Description ==
The upperside is light purple blue with a border of 2 to 3 millimeters. It is brown below with conspicuously white ringed large markings.
