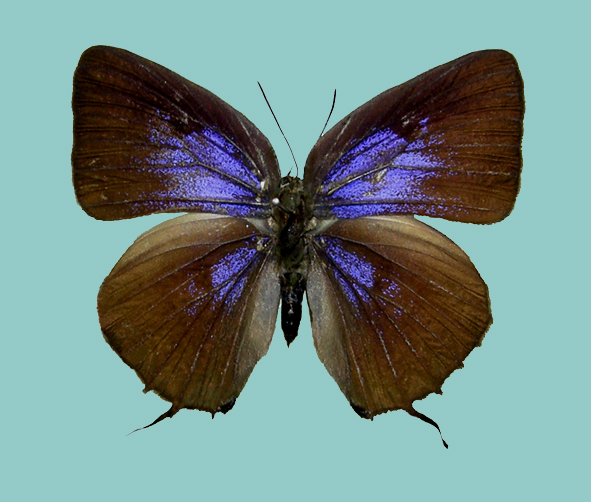
- Female upperside
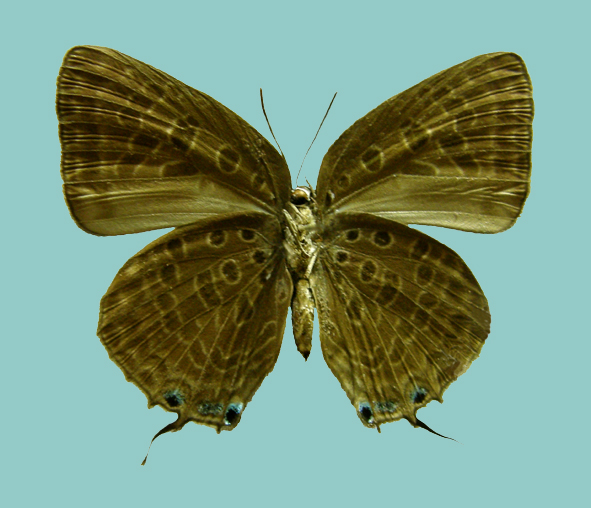
- Female underside both from Mount Halcon, Mindoro, Philippines

Scientific classification
- Kingdom: Animalia
- Phylum: Arthropoda
- Clade: Pancrustacea
- Class: Insecta
- Order: Lepidoptera
- Family: Lycaenidae
- Genus: Arhopala
- Species: A. pseudovihara

Binomial name
- Arhopala pseudovihara H. Hayashi, 1981

= Arhopala pseudovihara =

Species of butterfly

Arhopala pseudovihara is a butterfly of the family Lycaenidae first described by Hisakazu Hayashi in 1981. It is found on the Philippine islands of Mindanao, Leyte and Mindoro.
