= Arhopala grandimuta =

Scientific classification
- Kingdom: Animalia
- Phylum: Arthropoda
- Class: Insecta
- Order: Lepidoptera
- Family: Lycaenidae
- Genus: Arhopala
- Species: A. grandimuta

Binomial name
- Arhopala grandimuta Seki, 1993

Species of butterfly

Arhopala grandimuta is a butterfly in the family Lycaenidae. It was discovered by Yasou Seki in 1903. It is found in the Philippines.

== Subspecies ==
Two subspecies are recognized-

- Arhopala grandimuta grandimuta (Seki, 1993) - Leyte
- Arhopala grandimuta takanamii (Seki, 1993) - Mindanao
