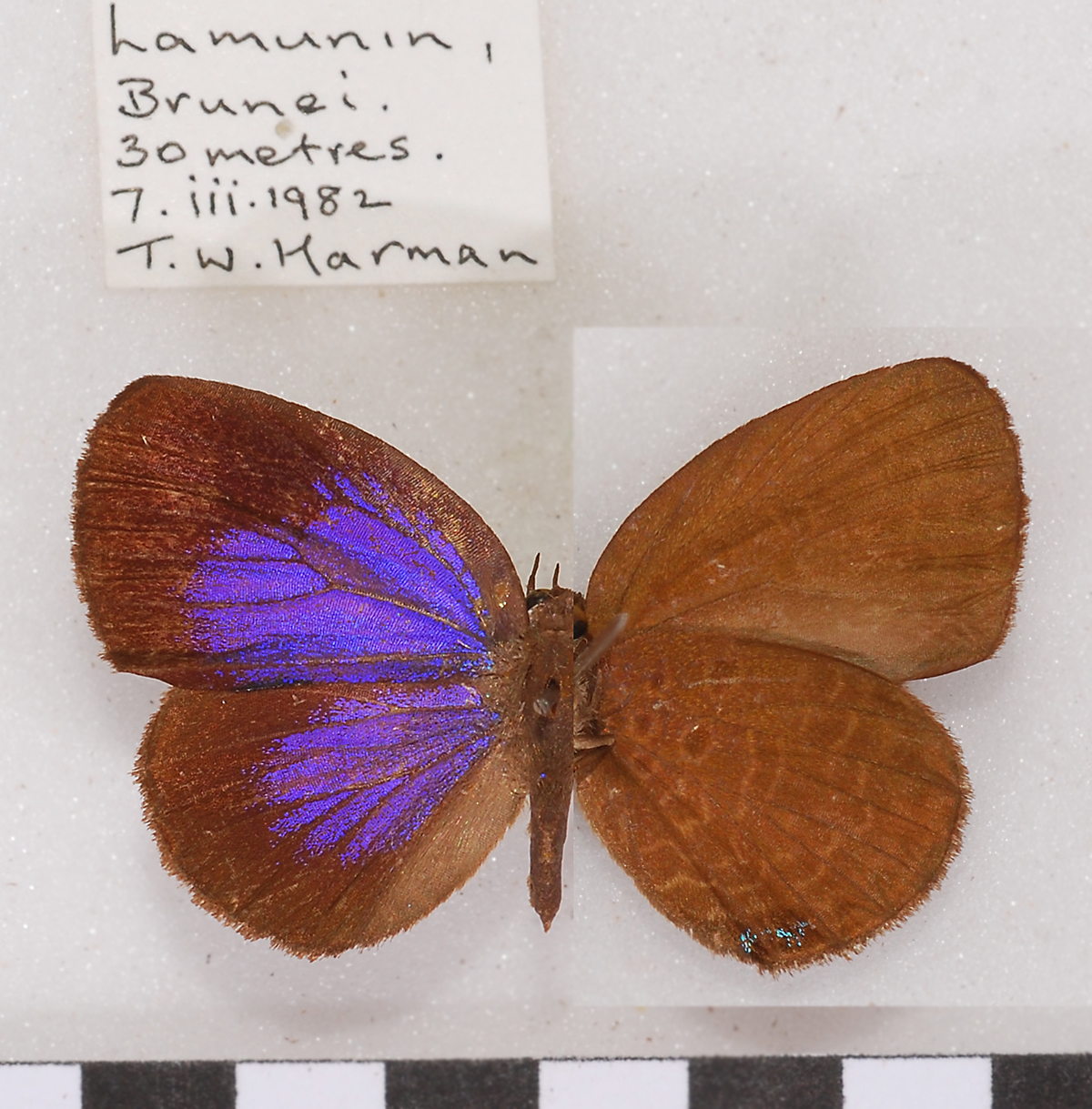
- Arhopala alica female, set specimen,

Scientific classification
- Kingdom: Animalia
- Phylum: Arthropoda
- Clade: Pancrustacea
- Class: Insecta
- Order: Lepidoptera
- Family: Lycaenidae
- Genus: Arhopala
- Species: A. alica

Binomial name
- Arhopala alica Evans, 1957

= Arhopala alica =

Species of butterfly

Arhopala alica is a butterfly in the family Lycaenidae. It was described by William Harry Evans in 1957. It is found in the Indomalayan realm (Borneo).
