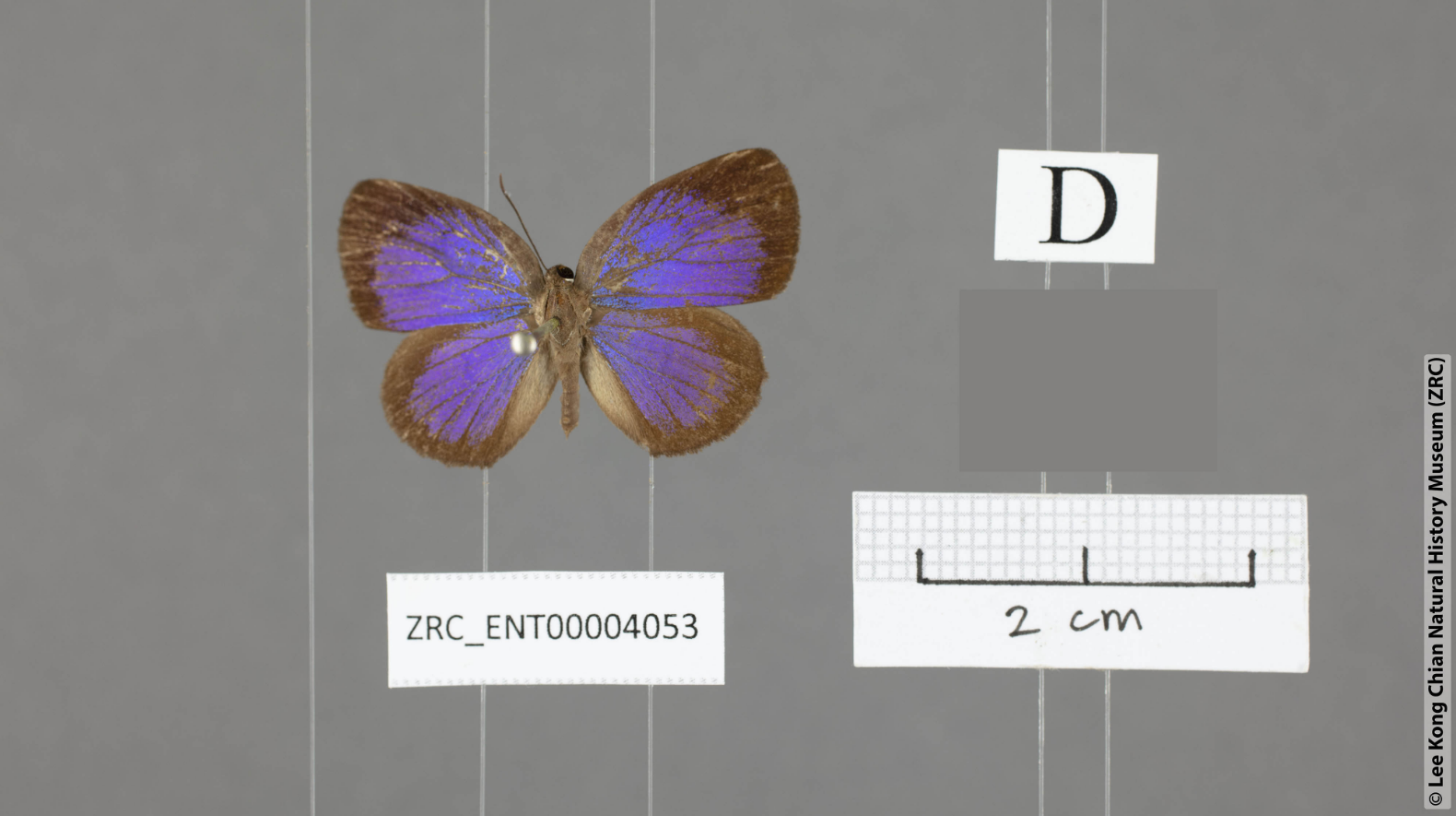
- Upperside
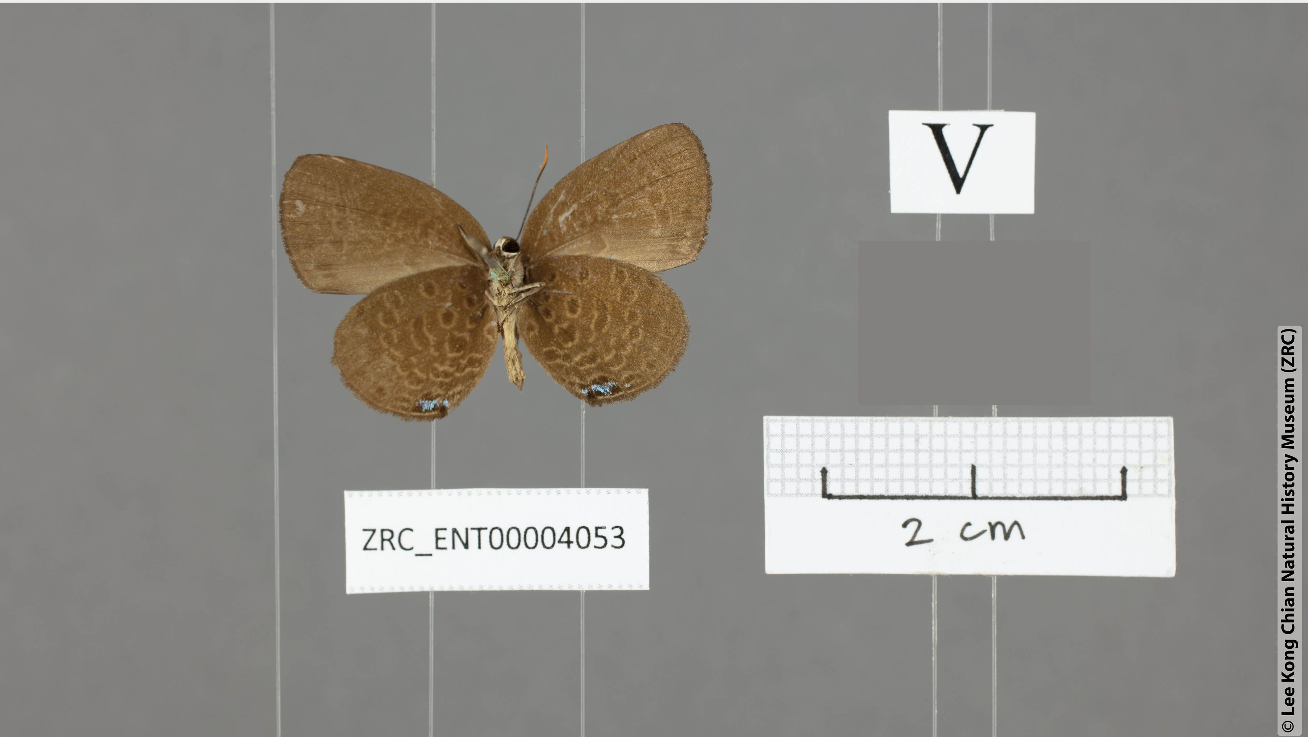
- Underside

Scientific classification
- Kingdom: Animalia
- Phylum: Arthropoda
- Clade: Pancrustacea
- Class: Insecta
- Order: Lepidoptera
- Family: Lycaenidae
- Genus: Arhopala
- Species: A. stubbsi

Binomial name
- Arhopala stubbsi Eliot, 1962

= Arhopala stubbsi =

Species of butterfly

Arhopala stubbsi, is a species of butterfly in the family Lycaenidae. It was discovered by John Nevill Eliot in 1962. It is found in West Malaysia.

== Description ==
It is dark shining blue on the upper side, and brown on the underside.

== Subspecies ==
Two subspecies are recognized-

- Arhopala stubbsi stubbsi (Eliot, 1962) - West Malaysia
- Arhopala stubbsi serapina (Seki, 1991) - Borneo and Sarawak
