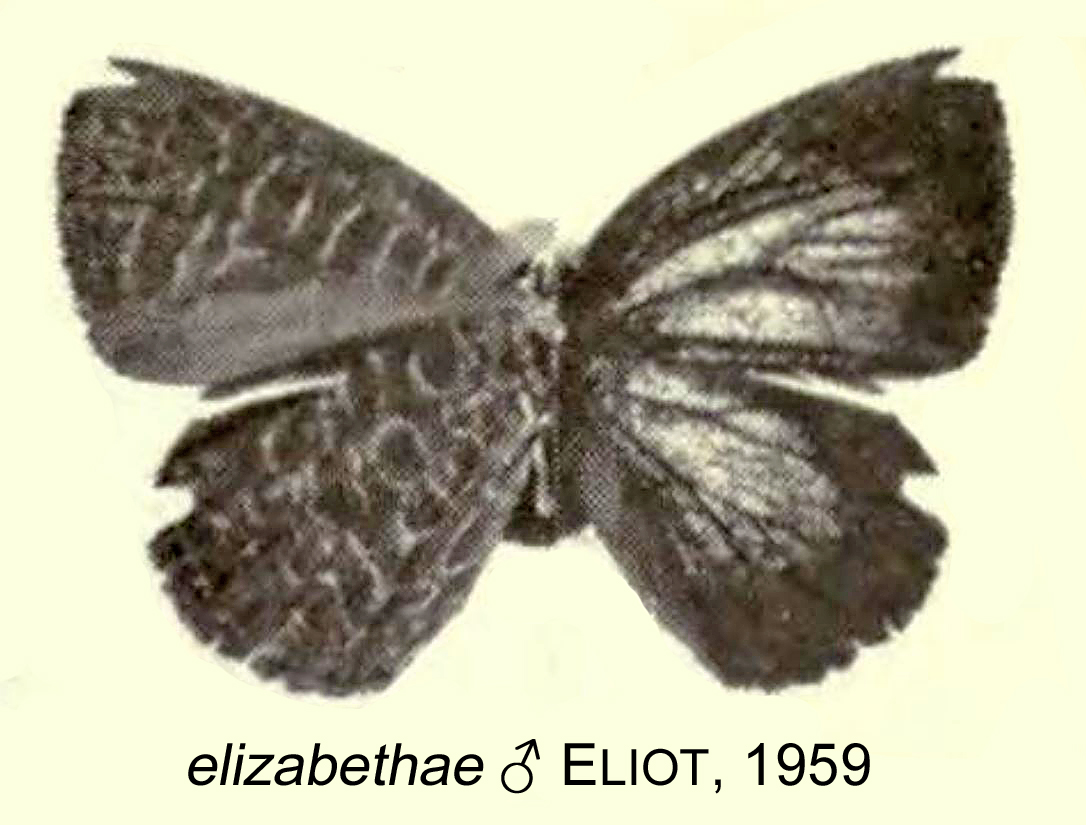
- Arhopala elizabethae from original description

Scientific classification
- Kingdom: Animalia
- Phylum: Arthropoda
- Clade: Pancrustacea
- Class: Insecta
- Order: Lepidoptera
- Family: Lycaenidae
- Genus: Arhopala
- Species: A. elizabethae

Binomial name
- Arhopala elizabethae ( Eliot, 1959)

= Arhopala elizabethae =

Species of butterfly

Arhopala elizabethae is a butterfly in the family Lycaenidae. It was described by John Nevill Eliot in 1959. It is found in the Indomalayan realm where it is endemic to Peninsular Malaya.
