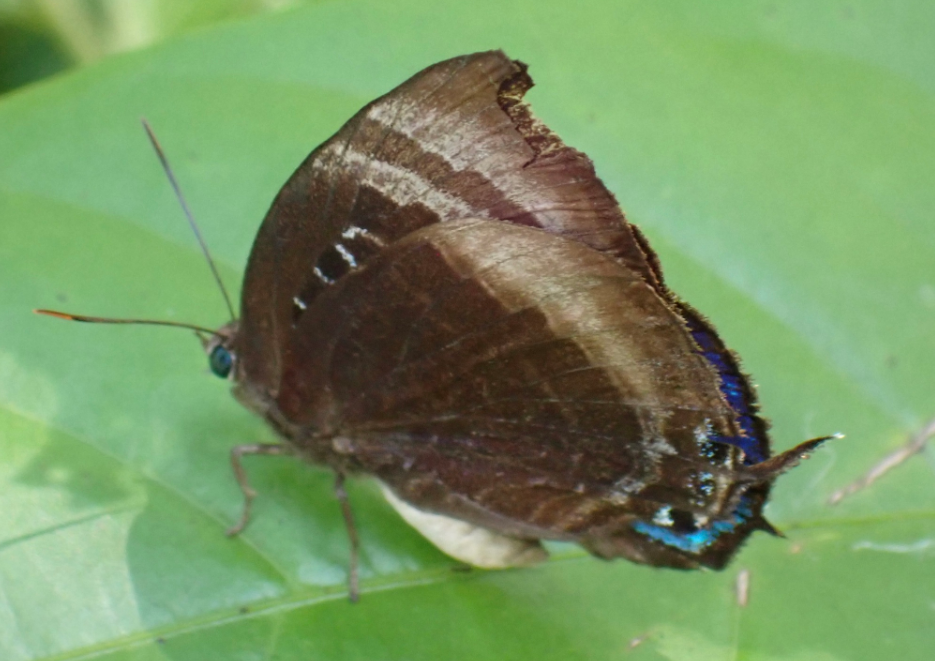
- Nominate subspecies in Waigeu
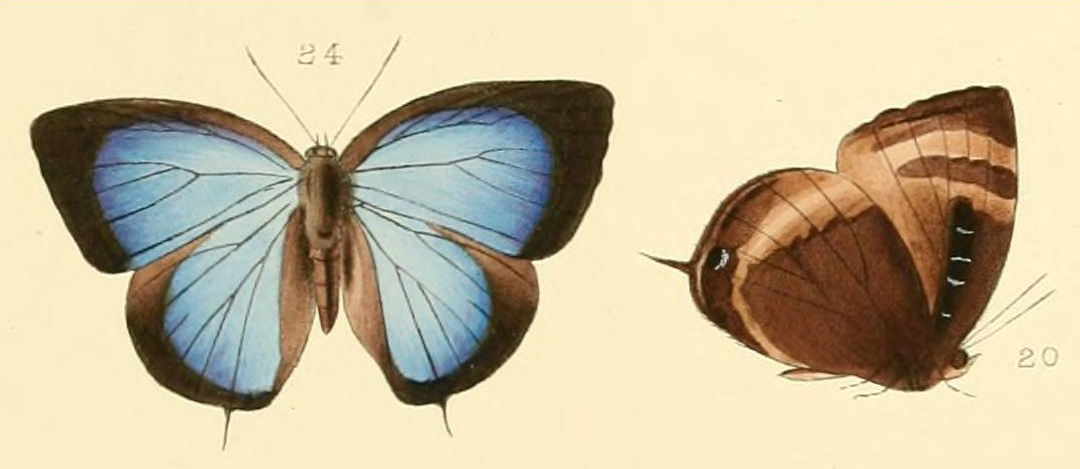
- Female top view (left) and male underside (right)

Scientific classification
- Kingdom: Animalia
- Phylum: Arthropoda
- Clade: Pancrustacea
- Class: Insecta
- Order: Lepidoptera
- Family: Lycaenidae
- Genus: Arhopala
- Species: A. aexone

Binomial name
- Arhopala aexone Hewitson, 1863

= Arhopala aexone =

Species of butterfly

Arhopala aexone is a species of butterfly in the family Lycaenidae. It was first described by William Chapman Hewitson in 1863. It is found in the Australasian realm.

This species is at once recognisable by the almost equably darkened under surface, whereby the hindwing is without any marking from the base to the marginal area. Male above lustrous silvery morpho-blue, towards the costa of the forewing tinted purple; female above slightly darker blue than the male, with a broad black margin.

== Subspecies ==
- A. a. aexone New Guinea, Aru, Buru, Waigeu, Biak, Noemfoor, Manam, Fergusson, Trobriand, Saint Aignan, New Ireland
- A. a. chrysoana Fruhstorfer, 1914 Halmahera- larger than nominate, the under surface more blackish-brown; the metallic green areas beneath in the cell of the forewing and the anal region of the hindwing are more prominent; the greyish-yellow zone of the hindwing is narrower and more distinctly defined than in the typical form.
