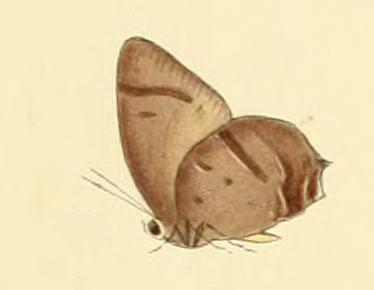

Scientific classification
- Kingdom: Animalia
- Phylum: Arthropoda
- Clade: Pancrustacea
- Class: Insecta
- Order: Lepidoptera
- Family: Lycaenidae
- Genus: Arhopala
- Species: A. caeca

Binomial name
- Arhopala caeca (Hewitson, 1863)

Synonyms
- Amblypodia caeca Hewitson, 1863

= Arhopala caeca =

Species of butterfly

Arhopala caeca is a species of butterfly of the family Lycaenidae. It is found on Borneo, Sumatra and Peninsular Malaysia.

Seitz-"caeca Hew. (147 e) is very similar to arvina, but beneath still darker, without the anal brightening in the forewing and with a short tail-appendage of the hindwing. The male is above lustrous lilac with a very arrow black margin; the female violettish-blue with a broad marginal black and cell-end spot.
