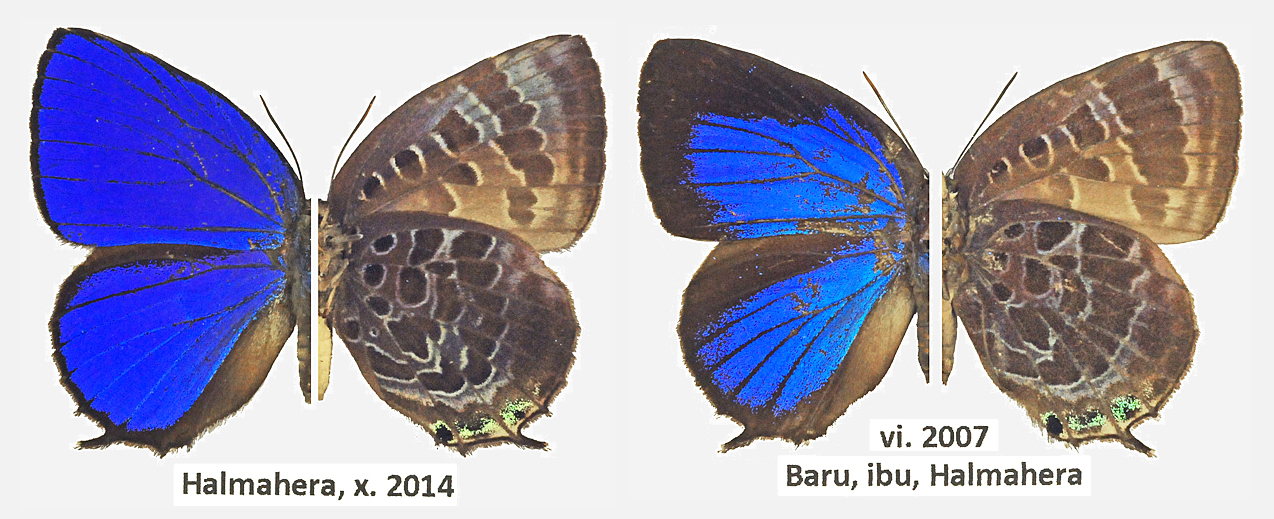
- Male (left) and female (right)

Scientific classification
- Kingdom: Animalia
- Phylum: Arthropoda
- Clade: Pancrustacea
- Class: Insecta
- Order: Lepidoptera
- Family: Lycaenidae
- Genus: Arhopala
- Species: A. halmaheira

Binomial name
- Arhopala halmaheira Bethune-Baker, 1904

Synonyms
- Narathura halmaheira

= Arhopala halmaheira =

Species of butterfly

Arhopala halmaheira is a butterfly in the family Lycaenidae. It was discovered by George Thomas Bethune-Baker in 1904. It is found in Halmahera. This species is monotypic.

== Description ==
The male's wings are blue on the top side, with a black border on the edges that is 1-2.5 millimeters in thickness. The female's top side is a lighter shade of blue and has a 7-millimeter thick black border. Both sexes' wings have a dark brown, purple-tinged underside, with white edges on the darker markings.
