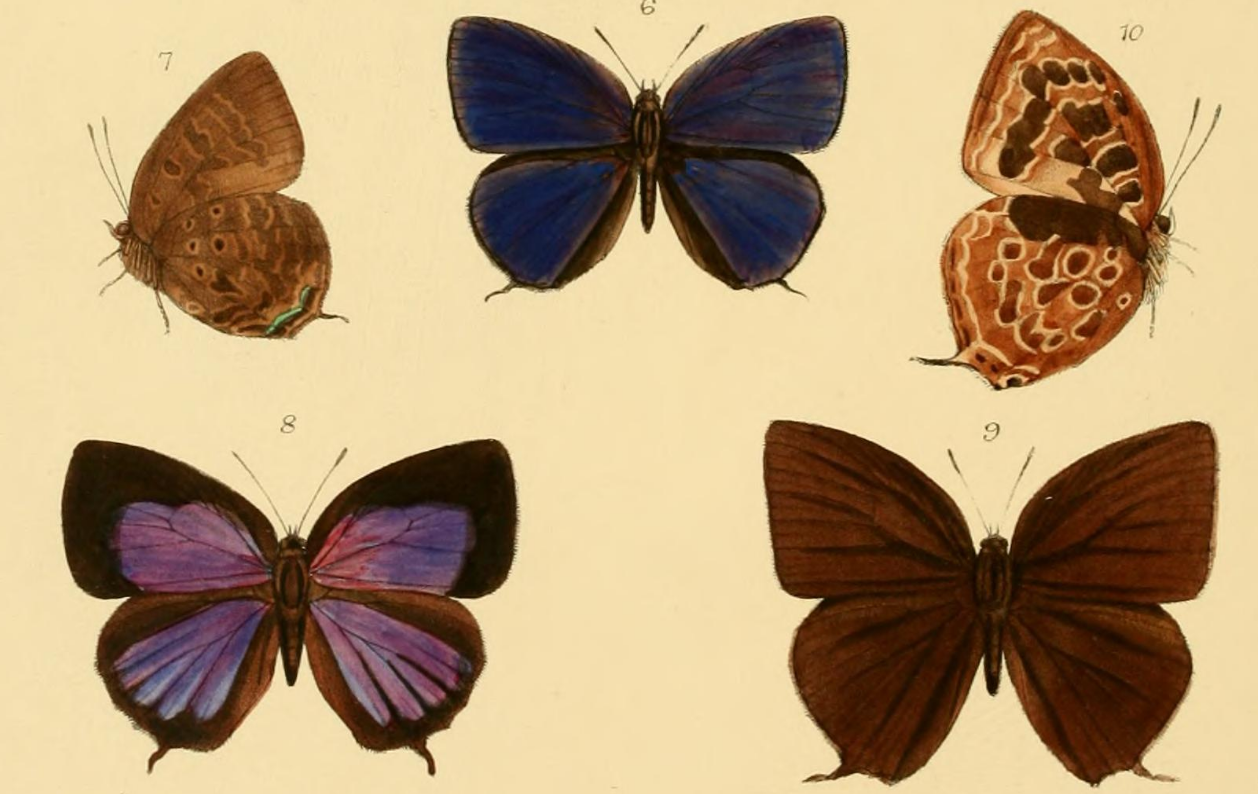
- Figure 6 and 7 (male) and 8 (female)

Scientific classification
- Kingdom: Animalia
- Phylum: Arthropoda
- Clade: Pancrustacea
- Class: Insecta
- Order: Lepidoptera
- Family: Lycaenidae
- Genus: Arhopala
- Species: A. hylander

Binomial name
- Arhopala hylander Grose-Smith, 1894

Synonyms
- Narathura hylander

= Arhopala hylander =

Species of butterfly

Arhopala hylander is a butterfly in the family Lycaenidae. It was discovered by Henley Grose-Smith in 1894. It is found in Biak. This species is monotypic.

== Description ==
The male is shining blue on the upperside, with a thin black border. The female is more purple with a broader black border on the upperside. The wings are uniform brown on the underside of both sexes, with the spots less clearly defined.
