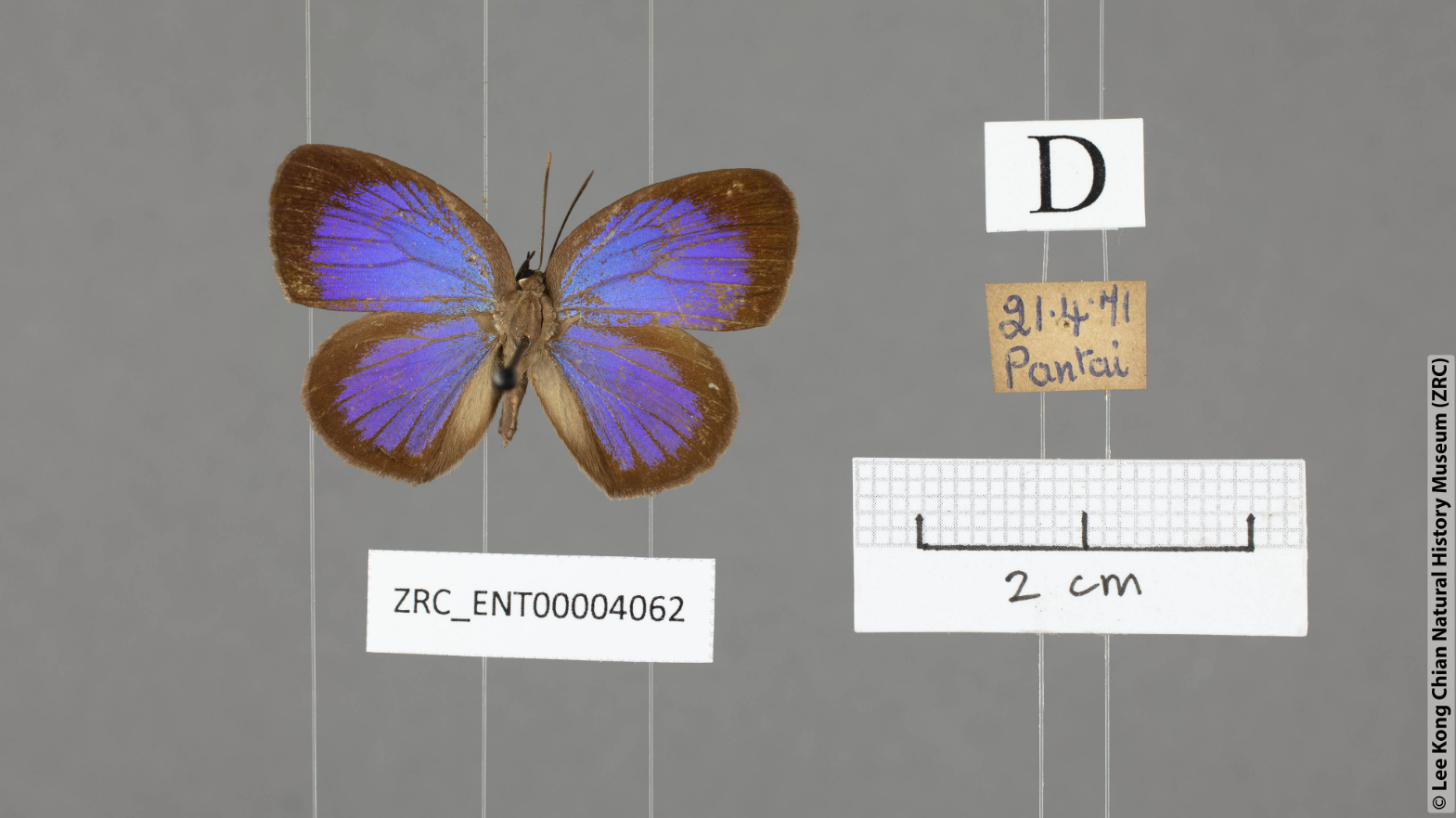
- Upperside
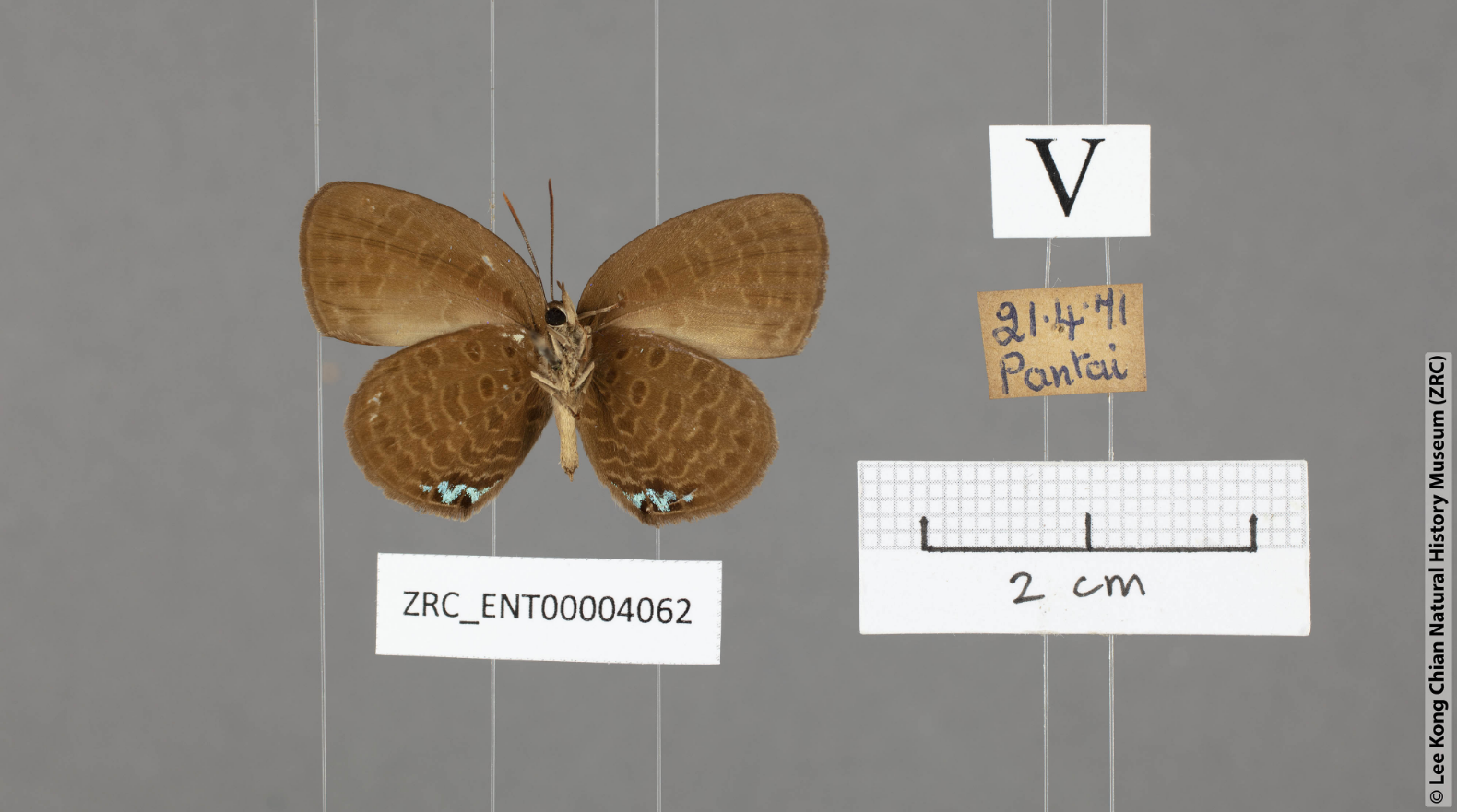
- Underside

Scientific classification
- Kingdom: Animalia
- Phylum: Arthropoda
- Class: Insecta
- Order: Lepidoptera
- Family: Lycaenidae
- Genus: Arhopala
- Species: A. tropaea

Binomial name
- Arhopala tropaea Corbet, 1941

Synonyms
- Narathura muta tropaea

= Arhopala tropaea =

Species of butterfly

Arhopala tropaea is a butterfly in the family Lycaenidae. It was discovered by Alexander Steven Corbet in 1941. It is found in West Malaysia. This butterfly is monotypic.

== Description ==
The upperside is a dark blue with a dark border. The underside is dull hair brown.
