= Arhopala rudepoema =

Scientific classification
- Kingdom: Animalia
- Phylum: Arthropoda
- Clade: Pancrustacea
- Class: Insecta
- Order: Lepidoptera
- Family: Lycaenidae
- Genus: Arhopala
- Species: A. rudepoema

Binomial name
- Arhopala rudepoema Seki, [1995]

Species of butterfly

Arhopala rudepoema is a butterfly in the family Lycaenidae. It was discovered by Yasuo Seki in 1995. It is found in the Philippines.
