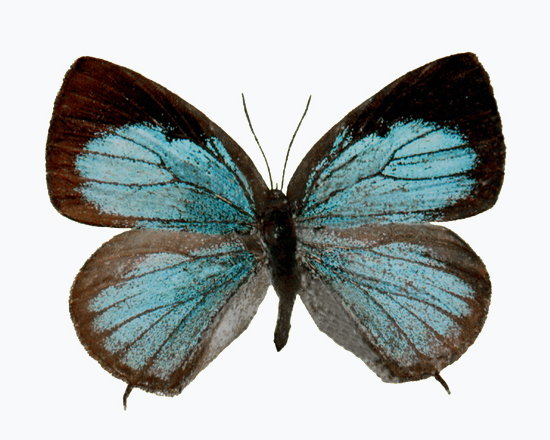
- Male upperside
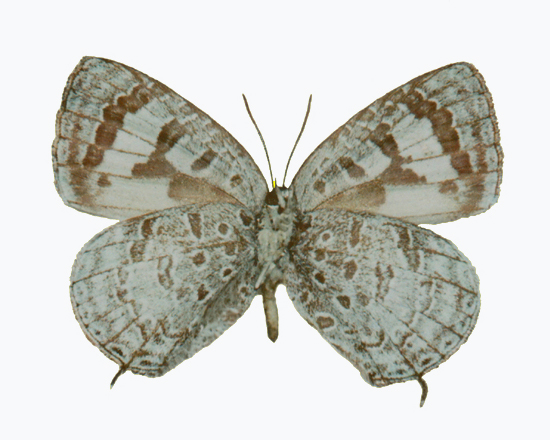
- Male underside

Scientific classification
- Kingdom: Animalia
- Phylum: Arthropoda
- Clade: Pancrustacea
- Class: Insecta
- Order: Lepidoptera
- Family: Lycaenidae
- Genus: Arhopala
- Species: A. tomokoae

Binomial name
- Arhopala tomokoae (H. Hayashi, 1976)

Synonyms
- Panchala paraganesa tomokoae H. Hayashi, 1976; Arhopala paraganesa tomokoae

= Arhopala tomokoae =

Species of butterfly

Arhopala tomokoae is a butterfly of the family Lycaenidae. Panchala paraganesa tomokoae H. Hayashi, 1976 was moved to Arhopala paraganesa tomokoae by Schröder and Treadaway in 1955 and its status changed to Arhopala tomokoae by Schrőder and Treadaway in 2002.

It is endemic to Palawan island in the Philippines. Forewing length is 13–15 mm.

The specific name is dedicated to Mrs. Tomoko HAYASHI, the wife of the author.
