= Arhopala aenigma =

Scientific classification
- Kingdom: Animalia
- Phylum: Arthropoda
- Clade: Pancrustacea
- Class: Insecta
- Order: Lepidoptera
- Family: Lycaenidae
- Genus: Arhopala
- Species: A. aenigma

Binomial name
- Arhopala aenigma Eliot, 1972

Species of butterfly

Arhopala aenigma is a butterfly in the family Lycaenidae. It was discovered by John Nevill Eliot in 1972. It is found in Borneo.
