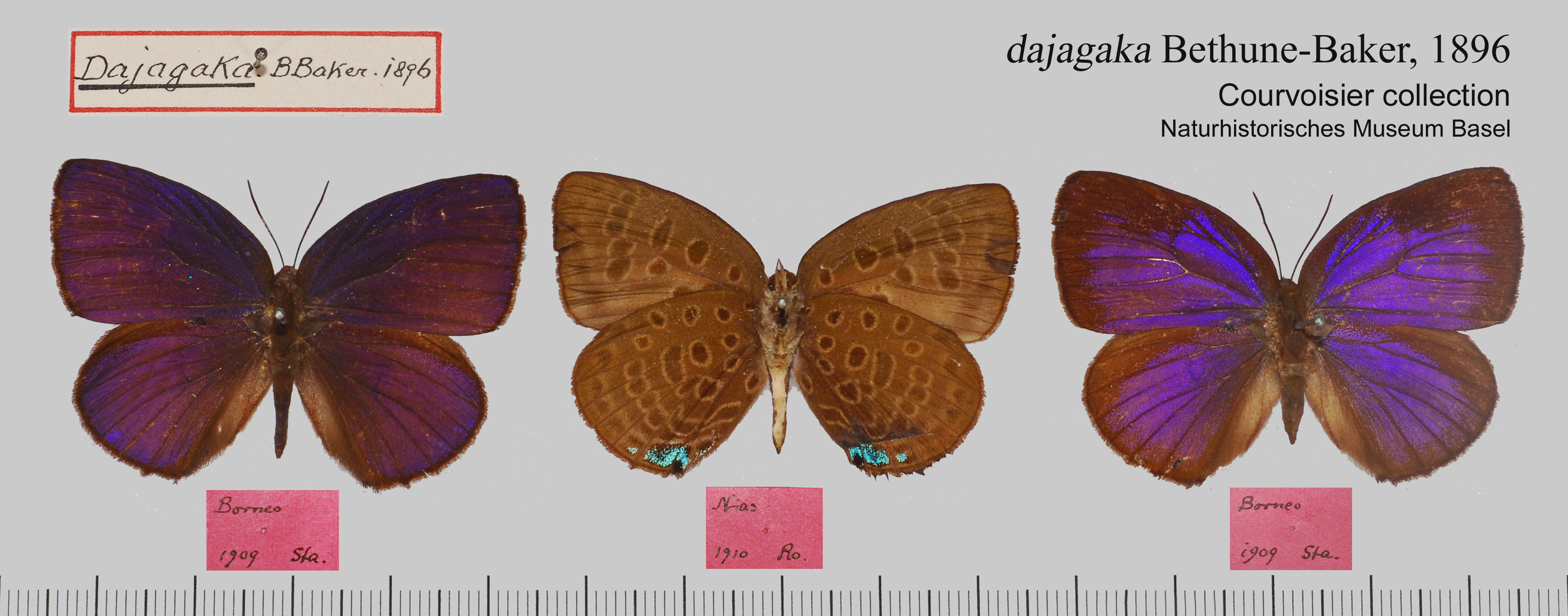
- Arhopala dajagaka Courvoisier Collection, Basel

Scientific classification
- Kingdom: Animalia
- Phylum: Arthropoda
- Clade: Pancrustacea
- Class: Insecta
- Order: Lepidoptera
- Family: Lycaenidae
- Genus: Arhopala
- Species: A. dajagaka

Binomial name
- Arhopala dajagaka Bethune-Baker, 1896

= Arhopala dajagaka =

Species of butterfly

Arhopala dajagaka is a butterfly in the family Lycaenidae. It was described by George Thomas Bethune-Baker in 1896. It is Very similar to Arhopala semperi but differs in the tailless hindwings; besides the undersurface shows a greenish gloss above the brown, and the light borders of the markings are less distinct or whitish.
