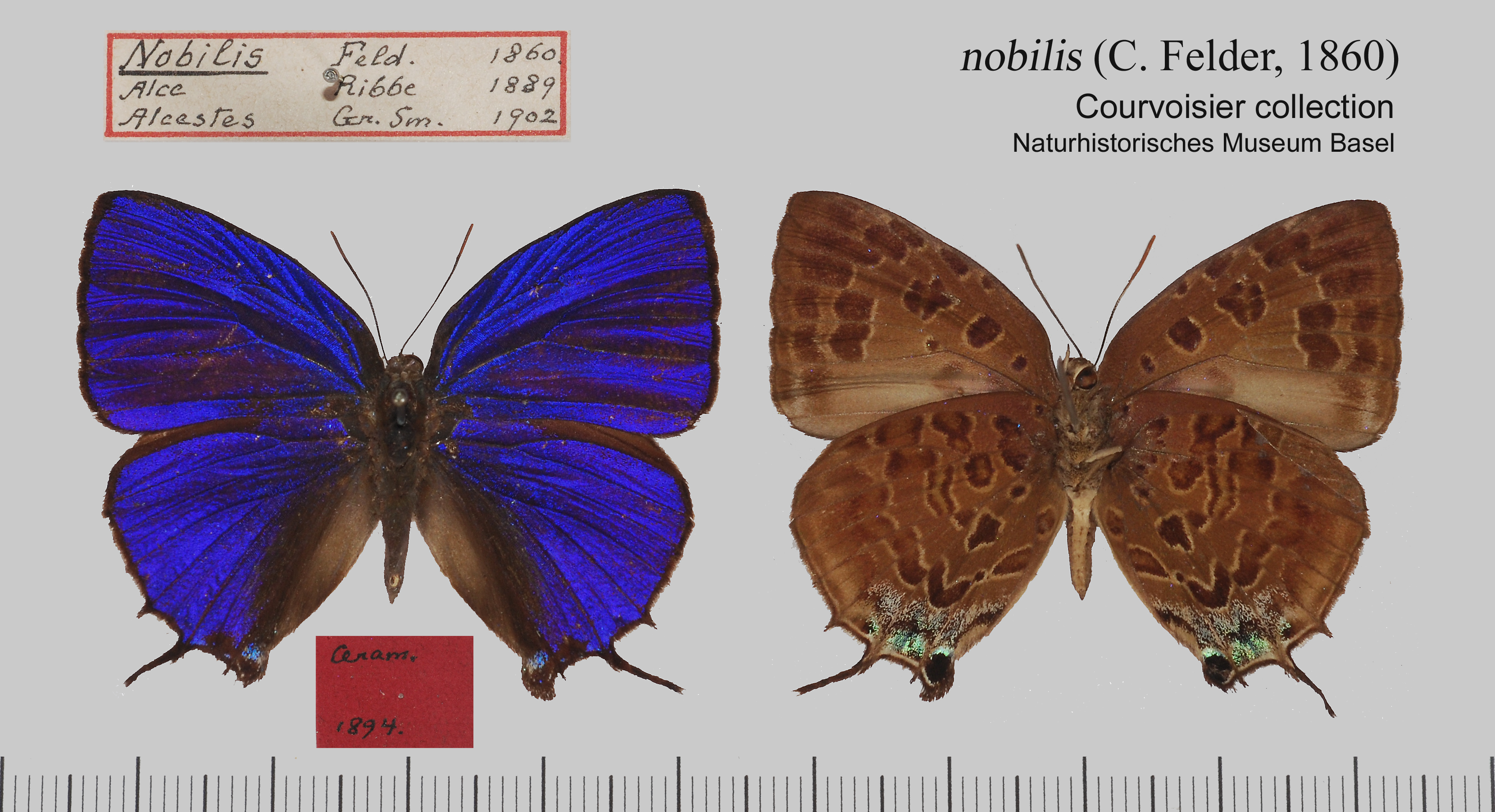
- Arhopala nobilis Courvoisier Collection, Basel

Scientific classification
- Kingdom: Animalia
- Phylum: Arthropoda
- Clade: Pancrustacea
- Class: Insecta
- Order: Lepidoptera
- Family: Lycaenidae
- Genus: Arhopala
- Species: A. nobilis

Binomial name
- Arhopala nobilis (Felder, 1860)

Synonyms
- Amblypodia nobilis C. Felder, 1860; Amblypodia alce Hewitson, 1862; Arhopala nobilis ajusa Fruhstorfer, [1914]; Arhopala nobilis athara Grose-Smith, 1902; Amblypodia caelestis Röber, 1931; Arhopala bosnikiana Joicey & Talbot, 1916; Arhopala nobilis nobilior Fruhstorfer, [1914]

= Arhopala nobilis =

Species of butterfly

Arhopala nobilis is a butterfly in the family Lycaenidae. It was described by Cajetan Felder in 1860. It is found in the Australasian realm

== Description ==
A. nobilis Fldr is a large form with a very bright ultramarine (male) or cyanid blue (female) upper surface, the male being narrowly, the female broadly margined with black. It is easily recognisable by the postmedian band on the forewing beneath, exhibiting two of the spots behind the cell-end pushed out of the chain towards the margin.

== Subspecies ==
- A. n. nobilis (Kai Island, Ambon, Serang, Obi)
- A. n. alcestis Grose-Smith, 1902 (Aru, Gebe, West Irian - Papua)- easily discernible by the two proximal thirds of the costal area on the hindwing beneath being dark brown, the rest of the hindwing being of an ochreous ground-colour.
- A. n. alce (Hewitson, 1862) (Aru, Halmahera) intensely brown spots beneath, with a darker brown ground-colour, and intense metallic spots at the anal angle; a small tail, present.
- A. n. bosnikiana Joicey & Talbot, 1916 (Biak, Noemfoor Island)
