= Arhopala hellenoroides =

Scientific classification
- Kingdom: Animalia
- Phylum: Arthropoda
- Class: Insecta
- Order: Lepidoptera
- Family: Lycaenidae
- Genus: Arhopala
- Species: A. hellenoroides

Binomial name
- Arhopala hellenoroides Hewitson, 1863

Species of butterfly

Arhopala hellenoroides is a butterfly in the family Lycaenidae. It was discovered by William Chapman Hewitson in 1863. It is found in Hainan.

== Description ==
Both the wings are violet-brown with a coppery gloss. This species is closely related to A. hellenore. The differences are that the area of the golden-green reflective patch on the dorsal side of the wings is very small. The apex of the forewing is relatively pointed.
