= Arhopala doreena =

Scientific classification
- Kingdom: Animalia
- Phylum: Arthropoda
- Class: Insecta
- Order: Lepidoptera
- Family: Lycaenidae
- Genus: Arhopala
- Species: A. doreena

Binomial name
- Arhopala doreena Parsons, 1986

Species of butterfly

Arhopala doreena is a butterfly in the family Lycaenidae. It was discovered by Michael John Parsons in 1986. It is found in New Guinea. This species is monotypic.
