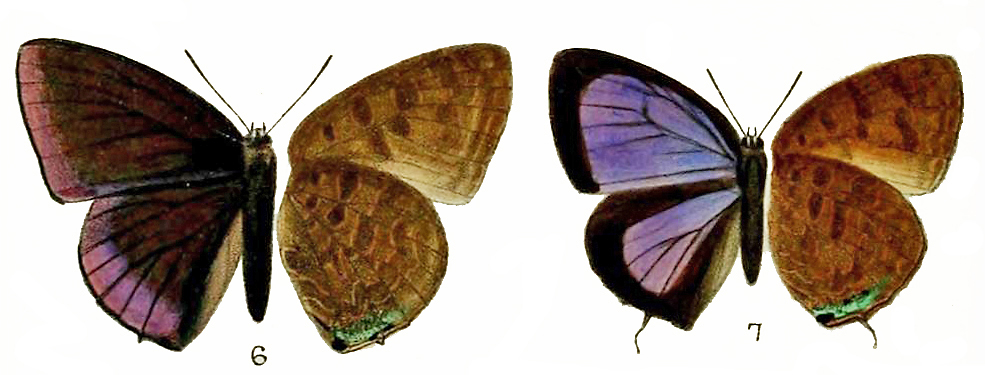
- Arhopala bella, male, female, Borneo, from original description

Scientific classification
- Kingdom: Animalia
- Phylum: Arthropoda
- Clade: Pancrustacea
- Class: Insecta
- Order: Lepidoptera
- Family: Lycaenidae
- Genus: Arhopala
- Species: A. bella

Binomial name
- Arhopala bella Bethune-Baker, 1896

= Arhopala bella =

Species of butterfly

Arhopala bella is a butterfly in the family Lycaenidae. It was described by George Thomas Bethune-Baker in 1896. It is found in the Indomalayan realm where it is endemic to Borneo.

In the male the upper surface is brown, but the marginal areas in both wings show a violettish-blue reflection; in the female the whole upper surface is lilac-blue, with a black distal margin of 3 to 4 mm width. Under surface with very dull markings which are feebly defined.
