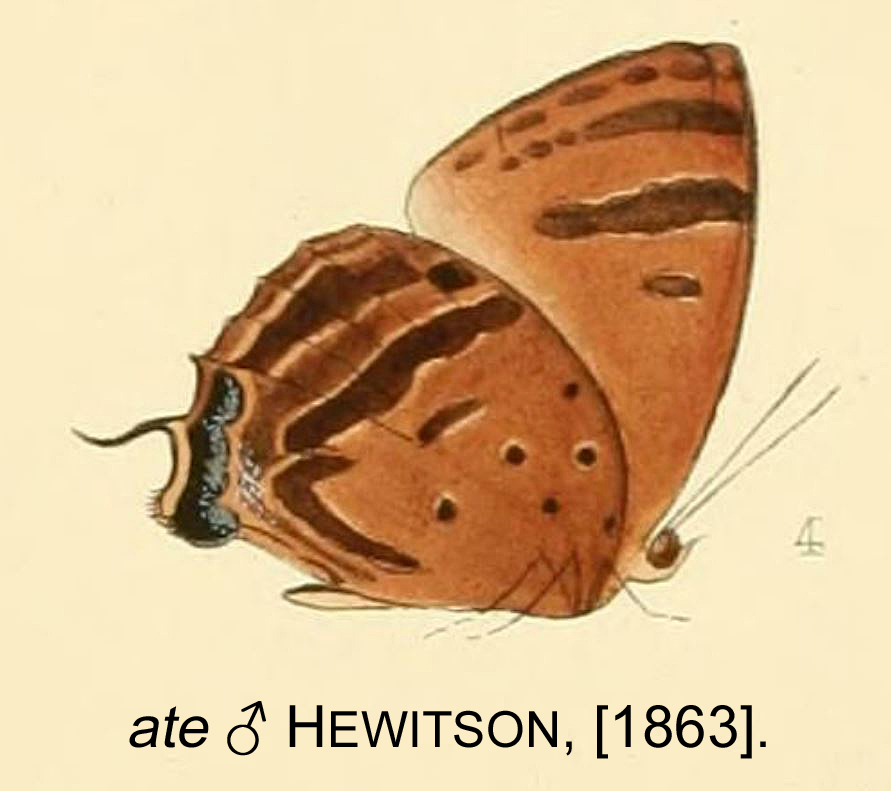
- Arhopala ate from original description

Scientific classification
- Kingdom: Animalia
- Phylum: Arthropoda
- Clade: Pancrustacea
- Class: Insecta
- Order: Lepidoptera
- Family: Lycaenidae
- Genus: Arhopala
- Species: A. ate

Binomial name
- Arhopala ate (Hewitson, 1863)

= Arhopala ate =

Species of butterfly

Arhopala ate is a butterfly in the family Lycaenidae. It was described by William Chapman Hewitson in 1863. It is found in the Australasian realm.

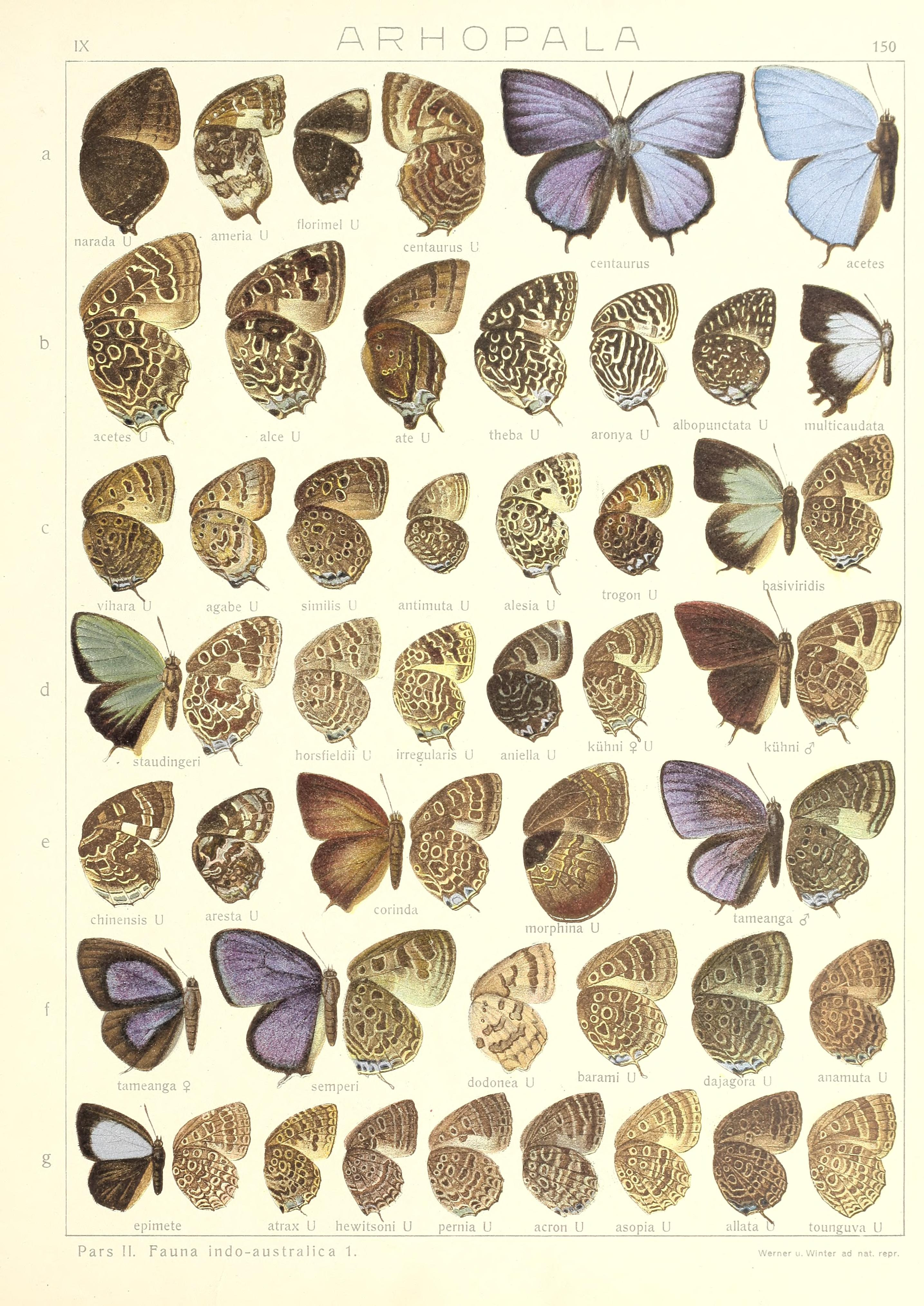
ate (a) with related species

== Description ==
Male above violettish-blue, but covered with a dark shadow and therefore not brightly glaring. Beneath the cross-bands are very straight and, like the scanty small proximal spots, surrounded with a light colour.

== Subspecies ==
- A. a. ate Ambon, Serang
- A. a. aruana (Evans, 1957) Aru
- A. a. jobina (Evans, 1957) Jobi, Biak, Noemfoor, New Guinea
