= Arhopala cardoni =

Scientific classification
- Kingdom: Animalia
- Phylum: Arthropoda
- Class: Insecta
- Order: Lepidoptera
- Family: Lycaenidae
- Genus: Arhopala
- Species: A. cardoni

Binomial name
- Arhopala cardoni Corbet, 1941

Synonyms
- Narathura cardoni

Species of butterfly

Arhopala cardoni is a butterfly in the family Lycaenidae. It was described by Alexander Steven Corbet in 1941. It is found in West Malaysia. This species is monotypic.

== Description ==
It is shining blue above with a border of 5 millimeters. The underside has small markings.
