= List of butterflies of Peninsular Malaysia =

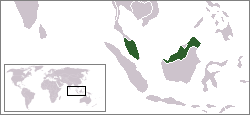
Location of Malaysia

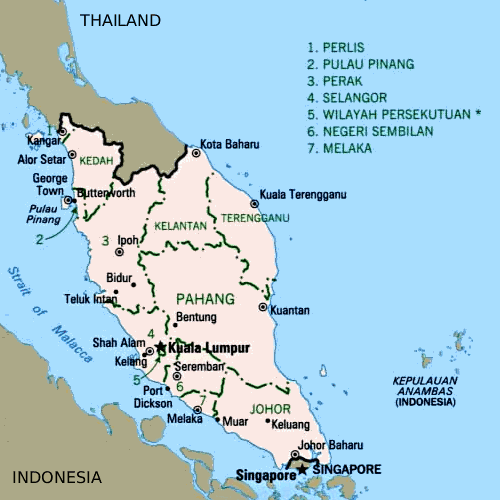
Peninsular Malaysia

This is a list of butterflies of Peninsular Malaysia. About 1,180 species are known from Peninsular Malaysia. The environment of Malaysia is varied and Malaysia's ecology is megadiverse, with a biodiverse range of flora and fauna found in various ecoregions throughout the country.

== Papilionidae ==
- Chilasa agestor shirozui—tawny mime
- Chilasa clytia clytia—common mime
- Chilasa paradoxa aenigma—great blue mime
- Chilasa slateri perses—blue striped mime
- Graphium aristeus hermocrates—stripe swordtail
- Graphium agamemnon agamemnon—tailed jay
- Graphium arycles arycles—green jay
- Graphium bathycles bathycloides—veined jay
- Graphium chironides malayanum—striped jay
- Graphium doson evemonides—common jay
- Graphium doson kajanga
- Graphium empedovana
- Graphium eurypylus mecisteus—great jay
- Graphium evemon eventus—blue jay
- Graphium sarpedon luctatius—common bluebottle
- Lamproptera curius curius—white dragontail
- Lamproptera meges virescens—green dragontail
- Meandrusa payeni ciminius—yellow gorgon
- Pachliopta aristolochiae asteris—common rose
- Pachliopta coon doubledayi—common clubtail
- Pachliopta neptunus neptunus—yellow bodied clubtail
- Papilio demoleus malayanus—lime butterfly
- Papilio demolion demolion—banded swallowtail
- Papilio helenus helenus—red Helen
- Papilio iswara iswara—great Helen
- Papilio iswaroides curtisi
- Papilio mahadeva—Burmese raven
- Papilio memnon agenor—great Mormon
- Papilio nephelus annulus
- Papilio nephelus sunatus—black and white Helen
- Papilio palinurus palinurus—banded peacock
- Papilio paris paris—Paris peacock
- Papilio polytes romulus—common Mormon
- Papilio prexaspes prexaspes—blue Helen
- Parides sycorax egertoni
- Parides nox erebus—Malayan batwing
- Parides varuna varuna—common batwing
- Pathysa agetes iponus—fourbar swordtail
- Pathysa antiphates itamputi—five bar swordtail
- Pathysa antiphates pulauensis
- Pathysa delessertii delessertii—Malayan zebra
- Pathysa macareus macaristus
- Pathysa macareus perakensis—lesser zebra
- Pathysa megarus megapenthes
- Pathysa megarus tiomanensis
- Pathysa ramaceus pendleburyi—Pendlebury's zebra
- Troides brookiana albescens—Rajah Brooke's birdwing
- Troides brookiana mollumar
- Troides aeacus thomsonii
- Troides amphrysus ruficollis—Malayan birdwing
- Troides cuneifera paeninsulae
- Troides helena cerberus—common birdwing

== Pieridae ==
- Catopsilia pomona pomona—lemon emigrant
- Catopsilia pyranthe pyranthe—mottled emigrant
- Catopsilia scylla cornelia—orange emigrant
- Dercas verhuelli herodorus
- Eurema ada iona
- Eurema andersonii andersonii
- Eurema blanda snelleni—three spot grass yellow
- Eurema brigitta senna—no brand grass yellow
- Eurema hecabe contubernalis—common grass yellow
- Eurema lacteola lacteola
- Eurema sari sodalis—chocolate grass yellow
- Eurema simulatrix littorea
- Eurema simulatrix tecmessa
- Eurema simulatrix tiomanica
- Eurema tilaha nicevillei
- Gandaca harina aora
- Gandaca harina distanti—tree yellow
- Appias albina albina
- Appias cardena perakana
- Appias indra plana—plain puffin
- Appias lalassis indroides
- Appias libythea olferna—striped albatross
- Appias lyncida vasava—chocolate albatross
- Appias nero figulina—orange albatross
- Appias pandione lagela—banded puffin
- Appias paulina distanti—lesser albatross
- Appias paulina grisea
- Cepora iudith malaya—orange gull
- Cepora iudith siamensis
- Cepora iudith talboti
- Cepora nadina andersoni—lesser gull
- Cepora nerissa dapha—common gull
- Delias acalis perakana
- Delias agostina johnsoni
- Delias baracasa dives
- Delias belladonna malayana
- Delias descombesi eranthos
- Delias georgina keda
- Delias georgina orphne
- Delias georgina tahanica
- Delias georgina zenobia
- Delias hyparete metarete—painted Jezebel
- Delias ninus ninus—Malayan Jezebel
- Delias pasithoe parthenope—red-base Jezebel
- Delias singhapura singhapura
- Hebomoia glaucippe anomala
- Hebomoia glaucippe aturia—great orange tip
- Hebomoia glaucippe theia
- Ixias pyrene alticola
- Ixias pyrene birdi
- Ixias pyrene verna—yellow orange tip
- Leptosia nina malayana—Psyche
- Leptosia nina nina
- Pareronia anais—common wanderer
- Pareronia valeria lutescens—wanderer
- Phrissura aegis cynis—forest white
- Phrissura aegis pryeri
- Pieris canidia canidia—cabbage white
- Pieris napi montana
- Prioneris philonome themana—redspot sawtooth
- Prioneris thestylis malaccana
- Saletara liberia distanti—Malaysian albatross

== Nymphalidae ==
- Eulaceura osteria kumana—purple duke
- Euripus nyctelius euploeoides—courtesan
- Agatasa calydonia calydonia—glorious begum
- Charaxes harmodius maruyamai
- Charaxes bernardus crepax—tawny rajah
- Charaxes borneensis praestantius
- Charaxes distanti distanti
- Charaxes durnfordi dumfordi
- Charaxes marmax philosarcus—yellow rajah
- Charaxes solon echo—black rajah
- Polyura athamas athamas—common nawab
- Polyura athamas uraeus
- Polyura delphis concha—jewel nawab
- Polyura eudamippus peninsularis
- Polyura hebe chersonesus
- Polyura hebe plautus—plain nawab
- Polyura hebe takizawai
- Polyura jalysus jalysus
- Polyura moori moori
- Polyura schreiber tisamenus—blue nawab
- Prothoe franck uniformis—blue begum
- Chersonesia intermedia intermedia
- Chersonesia nicevillei
- Chersonesia peraka peraka—little maplet
- Chersonesia rahria rahria—wavy maplet
- Chersonesia risa risa
- Danaus affinis malayanus—Malay tiger
- Danaus chrysippus chrysippus—plain tiger
- Danaus genutia genutia—common tiger
- Danaus melanippus hegesippus—black veined tiger
- Euploea algea menetriesii
- Euploea camaralzeman malayica—Malayan crow
- Euploea camaralzeman paraclaudina
- Euploea core graminifera—common Indian crow
- Euploea crameri bremeri—spotted black crow
- Euploea crameri crameri
- Euploea doubledayi evalida
- Euploea eunice leucogonis—blue branded king crow
- Euploea eyndhovii gardineri—striped black crow
- Euploea klugii erichsonii—brown king crow
- Euploea midamus chloe
- Euploea midamus singapura—blue spotted crow
- Euploea modesta modesta
- Euploea modesta tiomana
- Euploea mulciber mulciber—striped blue crow
- Euploea phaenareta castelnaui—king crow
- Euploea radamanthus radamanthus—magpie crow
- Euploea sylvester harrisii
- Euploea sylvester tyrianthia
- Euploea tulliolus ledereri—dwarf crow
- Euploea tulliolus aristotelis
- Idea hypermnestra linteata
- Idea leuconoe chersonesia—mangrove tree nymph
- Idea lynceus lynceus
- Idea stolli logani—common tree nymph
- Ideopsis gaura kajangensis
- Ideopsis gaura perakana—smaller wood nymph
- Ideopsis juventa sitah—grey glassy tiger
- Ideopsis similis persimilis
- Ideopsis vulgaris macrina—blue glassy tiger
- Parantica aglea melanoides
- Parantica agleoides agleoides—dark glassy tiger
- Parantica aspasia aspasia—yellow glassy tiger
- Parantica luzonensis aurensis
- Parantica melaneus sinopion—chocolate tiger
- Parantica sita ethologa—yellow glassy tiger
- Tirumala gautama gautama
- Tirumala limniace exotica
- Tirumala septentrionis septentrionis—dark blue tiger
- Acraea issoria—yellow coster
- Acraea violae—tawny coster
- Cethosia biblis pemanggilensis—red lacewing
- Cethosia biblis perakana—red lacewing
- Cethosia hypsea elioti
- Cethosia hypsea hypsina—Malay lacewing
- Cethosia penthesilea methypsea—plain lacewing
- Cirrochroa emalea emalea—Malay yeoman
- Cirrochroa malaya malaya
- Cirrochroa orissa orissa—banded yeoman
- Cirrochroa satellita satellita
- Cirrochroa surya siamensis
- Cirrochroa tyche aurica
- Cirrochroa tyche rotundata—common yeoman
- Cupha erymanthis lotis—rustic
- Cupha erymanthis tiomana
- Phalanta phalantha phalantha—leopard
- Terinos atlita teuthras—great Assyrian
- Terinos clarissa aurensis
- Terinos clarissa malayanus—Malayan Assyrian
- Terinos terpander robertsia—royal Assyrian
- Terinos terpander tiomanensis
- Vindula dejone erotella—cruiser
- Libythea myrrha hecura
- Libythea narina rohini
- Athyma abiasa clerica
- Athyma asura idita—studded sergeant
- Athyma cama gynea
- Athyma kanwa kanwa—dot-dash sergeant
- Athyma larymna siamensis
- Athyma nefte subrata—colour sergeant
- Athyma perius perius—common sergeant
- Athyma pravara helma—lance sergeant
- Athyma ranga malaya
- Athyma reta moorei—Malay staff sergeant
- Athyma selenophora amharina—staff sergeant
- Athyma selenophora selenophora
- Euthalia aconthea gurda—baron
- Euthalia adonia pinwilli—green baron
- Euthalia merta merta—white tipped baron
- Euthalia monina monina—Malay baron
- Lasippa heliodore dorelia—Burmese lascar
- Lasippa monata monata
- Lasippa tiga siaka—Malayan lascar
- Lasippa tiga camboja
- Lebadea martha parkeri—knight
- Lexias canescens pardalina
- Lexias dirtea merguia—black archduke
- Lexias pardalis dirteana—archduke
- Moduza procris milonia—commander
- Neptis harita harita—chocolate sailor
- Neptis hylas papaja—common sailor
- Neptis leucoporos cresina—grey sailor
- Pandita sinope sinope
- Pantoporia hordonia hordonia—common lascar
- Pantoporia paraka paraka—Perak lascar
- Phaedyma columella singa—short banded sailor
- Tanaecia iapis puseda—Horsfield's baron
- Tanaecia pelea pelea—Malay viscount
- Amathusia binghami
- Amathusia friderici holmanhunti
- Amathusia masina malaya
- Amathusia ochraceofusca ochraceofusca
- Amathusia perakana perakana
- Amathusia phidippus phidippus—palm king
- Amathusia schoenbergi schoenbergi
- Amathuxidia amythaon dilucida—koh-i-noor
- Discophora necho engamon
- Discophora sondaica despoliata—common duffer
- Discophora timora perakensis—great duffer
- Enispe intermedia corbeti
- Faunis canens arcesilas—common faun
- Faunis gracilis
- Faunis kirata
- Melanocyma faunula faunula—pallid faun
- Taenaris horsfieldii birchi
- Thaumantis klugius lucipor—dark blue jungle glory
- Thaumantis noureddin noureddin—dark jungle glory
- Thaumantis odana pishuna
- Thauria aliris pseudaliris—tufted jungle king
- Zeuxidia amethystus amethystus—Saturn
- Zeuxidia aurelius aurelius—giant Saturn
- Zeuxidia doubledayi doubledayi
- Amnosia decora perakana
- Argynnis hyperbius sumatrensis—Indian fritillary
- Ariadne ariadne ariadne—angled castor
- Ariadne isaeus isaeus
- Ariadne merione ginosa—common castor
- Ariadne specularia arca
- Bassarona dunya dunya—great marquis
- Bassarona recta monilis—red-spot marquis
- Bassarona teuta goodrichi—banded marquis
- Bassarona teuta rayana
- Bassarona teuta tiomanica
- Cyrestis cocles earli
- Cyrestis maenalis martini—straight line mapwing
- Cyrestis nivea nivalis
- Cyrestis nivea pigmentosa
- Cyrestis themire pemanggilensis
- Cyrestis themire robinsoni
- Cyrestis themire siamensis
- Cyrestis themire themire
- Dichorragia nesimachus deiokes—constable
- Doleschallia bisaltide bisaltide—autumn leaf
- Dophla evelina compta—red-spot duke Latin
- Euthalia aconthea garuda
- Euthalia adonia beata
- Euthalia agnis paupera
- Euthalia alpheda langkawica
- Euthalia alpheda yamuna
- Euthalia anosia bunaya
- Euthalia djata rubidifascia
- Euthalia djata siamica
- Euthalia eriphylae raya
- Euthalia ipona
- Euthalia kanda marana
- Euthalia lubentina lubentina
- Euthalia mahadeva zichrina
- Euthalia malaccana malaccana
- Euthalia merta milleri
- Euthalia merta tioma
- Euthalia monina insularis
- Euthalia phemius phemius
- Euthalia whiteheadi mariae
- Herona marathus angustata—yellow pasha
- Herona sumatrana dusuntua
- Hestina mimetica ruvanella
- Hypolimnas anomala anomala—Malayan eggfly
- Hypolimnas bolina bolina—great eggfly
- Hypolimnas misippus misippus—Danaid eggfly
- Junonia almana javana—peacock pansy
- Junonia atlites atlites—grey pansy
- Junonia hedonia ida—chocolate pansy
- Junonia hedonia seitzi
- Junonia hierta hierta—yellow pansy
- Junonia iphita horsfieldi—chocolate soldier
- Junonia lemonias lemonias—lemon pansy
- Junonia orithya wallacei—blue pansy
- Kallima limborgii amplirufa—leaf butterfly
- Kaniska canace perakana—blue admiral
- Laringa castelnaui castelnaui
- Lebadea martha martha
- Lexias cyanipardus sandakana—great archduke
- Lexias dirtea iwasakii
- Moduza procris procris
- Moduza procris tioma
- Neptis anjana hyria
- Neptis clinia leuconata
- Neptis clinioides gunongensis
- Neptis duryodana nesia
- Neptis ilira cindia
- Neptis magadha charon
- Neptis miah batara
- Neptis nata gononata
- Neptis omeroda omeroda
- Neptis sankara peninsularis
- Neptis sedata
- Neptis soma pendleburyi
- Paduca fasciata fasciata—little banded yeoman
- Pantoporia aurelia aurelia
- Pantoporia dindinga
- Pantoporia sandaka sandaka
- Parthenos sylvia lilacinus—clipper
- Phaedyma columella parvimacula—short-banded sailer
- Phalanta alcippe alcesta—small leopard
- Phalanta alcippe aurica
- Phalanta alcippe tiomana
- Rhinopalpa polynice eudoxia—wizard
- Rohana parisatis siamensis
- Sephisa chandra stubbsi
- Stibochiona nicea subucula
- Sumalia agneya
- Sumalia daraxa theoda
- Symbrenthia hippoclus selangorana
- Symbrenthia hypatia chersonesia
- Symbrenthia hypselis sinis
- Symbrenthia lilaea luciana—common jester
- Tanaecia aruna aruna
- Tanaecia clathrata violaria
- Tanaecia cocytus cocytus
- Tanaecia coelebs
- Tanaecia flora andersonii
- Tanaecia flora flora
- Tanaecia godartii asoka—Malay count
- Tanaecia godartii puloa
- Tanaecia julii bougainvillei—common earl
- Tanaecia julii xiphiones
- Tanaecia lepidea matala
- Tanaecia munda waterstradti
- Tanaecia palguna consanguinea
- Tanaecia pelea irenae
- Vagrans egista macromalayana—vagrant
- Vanessa indica indica—Indian red admiral
- Vindula dejone rafflesi
- Vindula dejone tiomana
- Vindula erota chersonesia
- Vindula erota erota—common cruiser
- Yoma sabina vasuki
- Coelites epiminthia epiminthia
- Coelites euptychioides humilis
- Elymnias casiphone saueri
- Elymnias dara darina
- Elymnias esaca esaca
- Elymnias harterti harterti
- Elymnias hypermnestra agina—common palmfly
- Elymnias hypermnestra discrepans
- Elymnias hypermnestra nimota
- Elymnias hypermnestra tinctoria
- Elymnias kamara erinyes
- Elymnias kuenstleri kuenstleri
- Elymnias nesaea lioneli—tiger palmfly
- Elymnias panthera panthera—tawny palmfly
- Elymnias panthera tiomanica
- Elymnias patna hanitschi
- Elymnias penanga penanga—pointed palmfly
- Erites angularis angularis
- Erites argentina delia
- Erites elegans distincta
- Erites medura russelli
- Ethope diademoides hislopi
- Lethe chandica namura
- Lethe confusa enima—banded tree brown
- Lethe europa malaya—bamboo tree brown
- Lethe mekara gopaka—common red forester
- Lethe minerva minerva
- Lethe sinorix vanda
- Lethe verma robinsoni—straight treebrown
- Lethe vindhya luaba
- Melanitis leda leda—common evening brown
- Melanitis phedima abdullae—dark evening brown
- Melanitis zitenius auletes
- Mycalesis anapita anapita
- Mycalesis anaxias senoi
- Mycalesis anaxioides
- Mycalesis dohertyi dohertyi
- Mycalesis fusca fusca—Malayan bush brown
- Mycalesis horsfieldi hermana
- Mycalesis intermedia distanti
- Mycalesis janardana sagittigera—common bush brown
- Mycalesis maianeas maianeas
- Mycalesis mineus macromalayana—dark brand bush brown
- Mycalesis mnasicles perna
- Mycalesis oroatis ustulata—red bush brown
- Mycalesis orseis nautilus—purple bush brown
- Mycalesis patiana
- Mycalesis perseoides perseoides
- Mycalesis perseus cepheus—dingy bush brown
- Mycalesis visala phamis—long brand bush brown
- Neorina lowii neophyta—Malayan owl
- Orsotriaena medus cinerea—nigger
- Ragadia crisilda critolina
- Ragadia makuta siponta—Malayan ringlet
- Xanthotaenia busiris busiris—yellow barred
- Ypthima baldus newboldi—common five ring
- Ypthima dohertyi mossmani
- Ypthima fasciata torone—common six ring
- Ypthima horsfieldii humei
- Ypthima huebneri—common four ring
- Ypthima pandocus corticaria—common three ring
- Ypthima pandocus tahanensis
- Ypthima philomela philomela
- Ypthima savara tonkiniana

== Riodinidae ==
- Abisara geza niya
- Abisara kausambi kausambi
- Abisara kausambi kausambi
- Abisara neophron chelina
- Abisara saturata kausambioides—Malayan plum Judy
- Abisara savitri savitri—Malay tailed Judy
- Dodona deodata anu
- Dodona egeon confluens—orange Punch
- Dodona eugenes chaseni
- Laxita thuisto thuisto—lesser harlequin
- Paralaxita damajanti damajanti—Malay red harlequin
- Paralaxita orphna laocoon—banded harlequin
- Paralaxita telesia lyclene—Malay red harlequin
- Stiboges nymphidia nymphidia
- Taxila haquinus haquinus—harlequin
- Zemeros emesoide emesoides
- Zemeros flegyas albipunctatus—Punchinello
- Zemeros flegyas allica—common Punchinello

== Lycaenidae ==
- Curetis bulis stigmata—bright sunbeam
- Curetis felderi
- Curetis freda
- Curetis insularis pseudoinsularis
- Curetis regula —regular sunbeam
- Curetis santana malayica —Malayan sunbeam
- Curetis saronis sumatrana—Sumatran sunbeam
- Curetis sperthis kawazoei
- Curetis sperthis sperthis
- Curetis tagalica jopa
- Curetis tagalica labuana
- Cigaritis kutu
- Cigaritis lohita senama—long-banded silverline
- Cigaritis seliga seliga
- Cigaritis syama terana—club silverline
- Acupicta bubases
- Acupicta flemingi
- Acytolepis puspa lambi—common hedge blue
- Acytolepis puspa volumnia
- Amblypodia anita anita—purple leaf blue
- Amblypodia anita parva
- Amblypodia narada taooana
- Ancema blanka blanka—silver royal
- Ancema ctesia ctesia—bi-spot royal
- Anthene emolus goberus—ciliate blue
- Anthene licates dusuntua
- Anthene lycaenina miya—pointed ciliate blue
- Araotes lapithis uruwela—witch
- Arhopala abseus abseus
- Arhopala ace ace
- Arhopala achelous achelous
- Arhopala achelous malu
- Arhopala acta
- Arhopala aedias agnis —large metallic oakblue
- Arhopala aedias meritatas
- Arhopala agaba
- Arhopala agelastus agelastus
- Arhopala agelastus perissa
- Arhopala agesias
- Arhopala agesilaus gesa
- Arhopala agrata agrata
- Arhopala aida aida —white-stained oakblue
- Arhopala aida ophir
- Arhopala alaconia media
- Arhopala alitaeus mirabella
- Arhopala alitaeus pardenas
- Arhopala allata pandora
- Arhopala ammon ammon
- Arhopala ammonides chunsu
- Arhopala ammonides monava
- Arhopala amphimuta amphimuta
- Arhopala amphimuta milleriana
- Arhopala anarte
- Arhopala anella
- Arhopala antimuta antimuta
- Arhopala ariana wilcocksi
- Arhopala arianaga
- Arhopala ariel
- Arhopala aroa aroa
- Arhopala arvina adalitas
- Arhopala athada athada —vinous oakblue
- Arhopala atosia jahara
- Arhopala atosia malayana —tailed disc oakblue
- Arhopala aurea
- Arhopala aurelia
- Arhopala avatha
- Arhopala avathina avathina
- Arhopala azinis azinis
- Arhopala barami penanga
- Arhopala bazaloides bazaloides
- Arhopala bazalus zalinda—powdered oak blue
- Arhopala belphoebe cowani
- Arhopala buddha cooperi
- Arhopala caeca
- Arhopala camdana camdana
- Arhopala cardoni
- Arhopala centaurus nakula —centaur oakblue
- Arhopala cleander aphadantas
- Arhopala corinda acestes
- Arhopala corinda corestes
- Arhopala delta
- Arhopala democritus democritus —white-dot oakblue
- Arhopala democritus lycaenaria
- Arhopala dispar pendleburyi
- Arhopala elizabethae
- Arhopala elopura elopura
- Arhopala epimete duessa
- Arhopala epimete suedas
- Arhopala epimuta epiala —common disc oakblue
- Arhopala eumolphus maxwelli—green oakblue
- Arhopala evansi
- Arhopala fulla ignara
- Arhopala fulla intaca
- Arhopala havilandi kota
- Arhopala hellada ozana
- Arhopala hellenore siroes
- Arhopala horsfieldi basiviridis
- Arhopala horsfieldi eurysthenes
- Arhopala hypomuta hypomuta
- Arhopala ijanensis
- Arhopala inornata inornata
- Arhopala johoreana johoreana
- Arhopala kinabala
- Arhopala kurzi
- Arhopala labuana
- Arhopala lurida
- Arhopala major major
- Arhopala major parvimaculata
- Arhopala metamuta metamuta
- Arhopala milleri
- Arhopala moolaiana maya
- Arhopala moolaiana yajuna
- Arhopala moorei busa
- Arhopala muta maranda
- Arhopala myrzala conjuncta
- Arhopala myrzala lammas
- Arhopala myrzalina
- Arhopala norda norda
- Arhopala norda ronda
- Arhopala normani
- Arhopala opalina azata
- Arhopala overdijkinki unda
- Arhopala paraganesa mendava
- Arhopala paralea
- Arhopala perimuta regina
- Arhopala phaenops sandakani
- Arhopala phanda phanda
- Arhopala pseudocentaurus dixoni
- Arhopala pseudomuta ariavana
- Arhopala pseudomuta pseudomuta —Raffles' oakblue
- Arhopala sceva indra
- Arhopala selta hislopi
- Arhopala semperi russelli
- Arhopala silhetensis adorea—Sylhet oakblue
- Arhopala silhetensis silhetensis
- Arhopala similis
- Arhopala sintanga tani
- Arhopala stinga
- Arhopala stubbsi
- Arhopala sublustris ridleyi
- Arhopala trogon
- Arhopala tropaea
- Arhopala varro selama
- Arhopala vihara hirava
- Arhopala vihara vihara
- Arhopala wildeyana havea
- Arhopala wildeyana wildeyana
- Arhopala zambra zambra
- Arhopala zylda elioti
- Artipe anna
- Artipe eryx excellens — green flash
- Austrozephyrus absolon malayicus
- Bindahara phocides phocides—plane
- Britomartis cleoboides viga
- Bullis buto cowani
- Bullis elioti elioti
- Bullis stigmata
- Caleta elna elvira—elbowed Pierrot
- Caleta elna epeus
- Caleta roxus pemanggilensis
- Caleta roxus pothus—straight Pierrot
- Caleta roxus rhodoides
- Callenya lenya lenya
- Castalius rosimon rosimon—common Pierrot
- Catapaecilma elegans zephyria
- Catapaecilma evansi evansi
- Catapaecilma lila
- Catapaecilma major emas —gray tinsel
- Catochrysops panormus exiguus—silver forget-me-not
- Catochrysops strabo strabo—forget-me-not
- Catopyrops ancyra—Ancyra blue
- Cebrella pellecebra mouitoni
- Cebrella pellecebra pellecebra
- Celastrina lavendularis isabella—plain hedge blue
- Charana mandarina splendida
- Chelakina nigerrima kerionga
- Cheritra freja frigga
- Cheritra freja frigga—common imperial
- Chilades lajus tavoyanus—lime blue
- Chliaria balua gabrieli
- Chliaria kina celastroides
- Chliaria othona semanga
- Chliaria pahanga
- Creon cleobis queda—broadtail royal
- Dacalana burmana
- Dacalana cremera ricardi
- Dacalana sinhara sinhara
- Dacalana vidura azyada
- Deudorix elioti
- Deudorix epijarbas cinnabarus—cornelian
- Deudorix hypargyria hypargyria
- Deudorix staudingeri
- Deudorix sumatrensis
- Discolampa ethion thalimar—banded blue Pierrot
- Drina cowani
- Drina donina usira
- Drina maneia
- Drupadia cinesoides
- Drupadia estella semperna
- Drupadia johorensis
- Drupadia niasica biranta
- Drupadia niasica perlisa
- Drupadia ravindra caerulea
- Drupadia ravindra moorei—common posy
- Drupadia rufotaenia rufotaenia—pygmy posy
- Drupadia scaeva
- Drupadia theda renonga
- Drupadia theda thesmia—dark posy
- Eooxylides tharis distanti —branded imperial
- Euchrysops cnejus cnejus—gram blue
- Everes lacturnus rileyi—Indian Cupid
- Flos anniella anniella
- Flos anniella artegal
- Flos apidanus ahamus
- Flos apidanus saturatus—plain plushblue
- Flos areste
- Flos diardi capeta—bifid plushblue
- Flos fulgida singhapura
- Flos morphine morphina
- Heliophorus epicles tweediei—purple sapphire
- Heliophorus ila malaya —restricted purple sapphire
- Horaga albimacula albistigmata—brown onyx
- Horaga amethystus purpurescens
- Horaga araotina
- Horaga chalcedonyx malaya
- Horaga onyx sardonyx—common onyx
- Horaga syrinx maenala—Ambon onyx
- Hypochrysops coelisparsus kerri
- Hypolycaena amabilis lisba
- Hypolycaena erylus teatus—common tit
- Hypolycaena merguia skapane
- Hypolycaena thecloides thecloides
- Ionolyce helicon merguiana—pointed line blue
- Iraota distanti distanti
- Iraota rochana boswelliana—scarce silverstreak
- Iraota timoleon wickii—silver streak blue
- Jacoona anasuja anasuja—great imperial
- Jamides abdul abdul
- Jamides abdul pemanggilensis
- Jamides alecto ageladas—metallic caerulean
- Jamides aratus adana
- Jamides bochus nabonassar—dark caerulean
- Jamides caeruleus caeruleus—sky blue
- Jamides celeno aelianus—common caerulean
- Jamides cyta minna
- Jamides elpis pseudelpis—glistering caerulean
- Jamides ferrari evansi
- Jamides malaccanus aurensis
- Jamides malaccanus malaccanus—soldier caerulean
- Jamides parasaturatus paramalaccanus
- Jamides philatus subditus
- Jamides pura pura
- Jamides talinga
- Jamides virgulatus nisanca
- Jamides zebra lakatti
- Lampides boeticus—pea blue / long-tailed blue
- Loxura atymnus fuconius—yamfly
- Loxura cassiopeia cassiopeia—larger yamfly
- Luthrodes pandava pandava—cycad blue
- Lycaenopsis haraldus haraldus
- Mahathala ariadeva ariadeva
- Manto hypoleuca terana—green imperial
- Mantoides gama gama
- Megisba malaya sikkima—Malayan
- Monodontides musina musina
- Nacaduba angusta kerriana—white four-line blue
- Nacaduba berenice icena—rounded six-line blue
- Nacaduba beroe neon
- Nacaduba calauria malayica
- Nacaduba hermus swatipa
- Nacaduba kirtoni
- Nacaduba kurava nemana—transparent six line blue
- Nacaduba pactolus odon—large four-line blue
- Nacaduba pavana singapura
- Nacaduba pavana vajuva
- Nacaduba pendleburyi penangensis
- Nacaduba pendleburyi pendleburyi—Malayan four-line blue
- Nacaduba russelli
- Nacaduba sanaya elioti—jewel four-line blue
- Nacaduba solta
- Nacaduba subperusia intricata
- Nacaduba subperusia lysa
- Neocheritra amrita amrita—grand imperial
- Neocheritra fabronia lina
- Neomyrina nivea hiemalis
- Neomyrina nivea periculosa
- Neopithecops zalmora zalmora—Quaker
- Niphanda asialis
- Niphanda cymbia cymbia
- Niphanda stubbsi
- Niphanda tessellata tessellata
- Oreolyce archena archena
- Petrelaea dana
- Pithecops corvus corvus—forest Quaker
- Pithecops fulgens fulgens
- Plautella cossaea parnbui
- Plautella cossaea sonchus
- Pratapa deva relata
- Pratapa icetas sakaia
- Pratapa icetoides calculis
- Prosotas aluta nanda
- Prosotas bhutea
- Prosotas dubiosa lumpura—tailless line blue
- Prosotas gracilis ni
- Prosotas lutea sivoka
- Prosotas nelides
- Prosotas nora superdates—common line-blue
- Prosotas pia pia
- Pseudotajuria donatana donatana—golden royal
- Purlisa gigantea gigantea
- Rachana jalindra burbona—banded royal
- Rapala cowani
- Rapala damona
- Rapala duma
- Rapala domitia domitia—yellow flash
- Rapala domitia flemingi
- Rapala hades
- Rapala iarbus iarbus—common red flash
- Rapala manea chozeba—slate flash
- Rapala nissa pahangana
- Rapala pheretima sequeira—copper flash
- Rapala pheretima tiomana
- Rapala rhodopis
- Rapala rhoecus rhoecus
- Rapala scintilla scintilla
- Rapala suffusa barthema—suffused flash
- Rapala varuna orseis—indigo flash
- Remelana jangala travana—chocolate royal
- Ritra aurea volumnia
- Semanga superba deliciosa
- Sinthusa malika amata
- Sinthusa nasaka amba—narrow spark
- Sithon nedymond ismarus
- Sithon nedymond nedymond—plush
- Suasa lisides suessa
- Surendra florimel
- Surendra vivarna amisena—acacia blue
- Tajuria albiplaga alixae
- Tajuria berenis larutensis
- Tajuria cippus maxentius—peacock royal
- Tajuria deudorix ingeni
- Tajuria dominus dominus
- Tajuria inexpectata
- Tajuria isaeus verna
- Tajuria ister tussis
- Tajuria luculenta taorana
- Tajuria maculata—spotted royal
- Tajuria mantra mantra—Felder's royal
- Tajuria megistia thria
- Tajuria sunia
- Tajuria yajna selangorana
- Tarucus waterstradti vileja
- Thamala marciana marciana
- Thamala marciana sarupa
- Thrix scopula nisibis
- Ticherra acte liviana
- Tongeia potanini glycon—dark Cupid
- Udara akasa catullus
- Udara albocaerulea scharffi—albocaerulean
- Udara aristinus klossi
- Udara camenae pendleburyi
- Udara coalita briga
- Udara cyma cyma
- Udara cyx tanarata
- Udara dilecta dilecta—pale hedge blue
- Udara placidula irenae
- Udara rona catius
- Udara selma tanarata
- Udara toxopeusi toxopeusi
- Una usta usta
- Virachola kessuma deliochus—pitcher blue
- Virachola smilis smilis
- Virachola subguttata malaya
- Yasoda pita dohertyi
- Yasoda pitane laruta
- Zeltus amasa maximinianus—fluffy tit
- Zinaspa todara karennia
- Zizeeria karsandra—dark grass blue
- Zizeeria maha serica—pale grass blue
- Zizina otis lampa—lesser grass blue
- Zizula hylax pygmaea—pygmy grass blue
- Allotinus albifasciatus
- Allotinus apries apries
- Allotinus borneensis
- Allotinus corbeti
- Allotinus davidis
- Allotinus fabius arrius
- Allotinus fallax apus
- Allotinus horsfieldi permagnus
- Allotinus leogoron leogoron
- Allotinus portunus maitus
- Allotinus sarrastes
- Allotinus strigatus malayanus
- Allotinus substrigosus substrigosus
- Allotinus subviolaceus subviolaceus
- Allotinus unicolor unicolor—lesser darkie
- Liphyra brassolis abbreviata—moth butterfly
- Logania distanti massalia
- Logania malayica malayica
- Logania marmorata damis
- Logania regina sriwa
- Miletus biggsii biggsii—Biggs's brownie
- Miletus chinensis learchus—common brownie
- Miletus gaesa gaesa
- Miletus gallus gallus
- Miletus gigantes
- Miletus gopara gopara
- Miletus heracleion heracleion
- Miletus nymphis fictus
- Miletus symethus petronius
- Miletus symethus solitarius
- Miletus values
- Spalgis epius epius—apefly
- Taraka hamada mendesia—lesser forest blue
- Taraka mahanetra
- Cyaniriodes libna andersonii—emerald
- Deramas alixae
- Deramas antynax
- Deramas anyx
- Deramas arshadorum
- Deramas basrii
- Deramas jasoda bradamante
- Deramas jasoda jasoda
- Deramas livens livens
- Deramas nelvis nelvis
- Deramas nolens pasteuri
- Poritia erycinoides phraatica
- Poritia hewitsoni taleva
- Poritia manilia evansi
- Poritia manilia manilia
- Poritia phama rajata
- Poritia phama regia
- Poritia philota philota
- Poritia pleurata
- Poritia promula elegans
- Poritia sumatrae sumatrae—Sumatran Gem
- Simiskina pasira
- Simiskina pavonica
- Simiskina pediada
- Simiskina phalena phalena
- Simiskina phalia potina
- Simiskina pharyge deolina—blue brilliant
- Simiskina pheretia pheretia
- Simiskina philura elioti
- Simiskina proxima dohertyi
- Simiskina sibatika

== Hesperiidae ==
- Badamia exclamationis—brown awl
- Bibasis sena uniformis—orange-tail awl
- Burara etelka—great orange awlet
- Burara gomata lalita—pale green awlet
- Burara harisa consobrina—orange awlet
- Burara jaina velva
- Burara oedipodea—branded orange awlet
- Burara owstoni
- Burara tuckeri
- Choaspes benjaminii flavens—Indian awl king
- Choaspes hemixanthus furcatus—orange red skirt
- Choaspes plateni caudatus
- Choaspes subcaudatus crawfurdi
- Hasora badra badra—common awl
- Hasora chromus chromus—common banded awl
- Hasora khoda minsona
- Hasora leucospila leucospila—violet awl
- Hasora lizetta
- Hasora mavis
- Hasora mixta prabha
- Hasora mus pahanga
- Hasora myra funebris
- Hasora quadripunctata gnaeus
- Hasora salanga
- Hasora schoenherr chuza—yellow banded awl
- Hasora taminatus malayana—white banded awl
- Hasora vitta vitta—plain banded awl
- Hasora wilcocksi
- Hasora zoma
- Acerbas anthea anthea
- Acerbas martini
- Aeromachus jhora creta
- Aeromachus pygmaeus
- Ampittia dioscorides camertes—bush hopper
- Ancistroides armatus armatus
- Ancistroides gemmifer gemmifer
- Ancistroides nigrita maura—chocolate demon
- Arnetta verones
- Astictopterus jama jama—forest hopper
- Baoris farri farri
- Baoris oceia—paintbrush swift
- Baoris penicillata
- Borbo cinnara cinnara—Formosan swift
- Caltoris bromus bromus
- Caltoris brunnea caere
- Caltoris cahira austeni
- Caltoris cormasa
- Caltoris malaya
- Caltoris philippina philippina
- Caltoris plebeia
- Caltoris sirius fusca
- Caltoris tulsi tulsi
- Cephrenes acalle kliana
- Cephrenes acalle niasicus
- Cephrenes trichopepla—yellow palm dart
- Cupitha purreea—waxy dart
- Eetion elia—white spot palmer
- Erionota acroleuca apicalis
- Erionota harmachis
- Erionota hislopi
- Erionota sybirita
- Erionota thrax thrax—banana skipper
- Erionota torus
- Gangara lebadea lebadea—banded redeye
- Gangara sanguinocculus—small redeye
- Gangara thyrsis thyrsis—giant redeye
- Ge geta
- Halpe arcuata
- Halpe aurifera
- Halpe clara
- Halpe elana
- Halpe flava
- Halpe hauxwelli
- Halpe hieron
- Halpe insignis
- Halpe kusala
- Halpe ormenes vilasina—dark banded ace
- Halpe pelethronix pelethronix
- Halpe porus—Moore's ace
- Halpe sikkima
- Halpe toxopea
- Halpe veluvana brevicornis
- Halpe wantona
- Halpe zema zamba
- Halpe zinda zodia
- Hidari bhawani
- Hidari doesoena doesoena
- Hidari irava—coconut skipper
- Hyarotis adrastus praba—tree flitter
- Hyarotis iadera
- Hyarotis microsticta microsticta
- Hyarotis stubbsi
- Iambrix distanti
- Iambrix salsala salsala—chestnut bob
- Iambrix stellifer—starry bob
- Idmon obliquans obliquans
- Isma bononia bononia
- Isma bononoides
- Isma cronus
- Isma damocles
- Isma feralia lenya
- Isma flemingi
- Isma guttulifera kuala
- Isma hislopi
- Isma iapis iapis
- Isma miosticta
- Isma protoclea obscura
- Isma umbrosa umbrosa
- Iton semamora semamora
- Koruthaialos butleri
- Koruthaialos rubecula rubecula—narrow-banded velvet
- Koruthaialos sindu sindu
- Lotongus avesta
- Lotongus calathus calathus
- Matapa aria—common redeye
- Matapa cresta—fringed redeye
- Matapa deprivata
- Matapa druna
- Matapa sasivarna
- Notocrypta clavata clavata
- Notocrypta clavata theba
- Notocrypta curvifascia corinda
- Notocrypta feisthamelii alysos—spotted demon
- Notocrypta paralysos asawa
- Notocrypta paralysos varians—banded demon
- Notocrypta pria
- Notocrypta quadrata
- Oerane microthyrus neaera
- Oriens gola pseudolus—common dartlet
- Oriens goloides
- Oriens paragola
- Parnara apostata
- Parnara bada bada
- Parnara ganga
- Pelopidas agna agna—little branded swift
- Pelopidas assamensis—great swift
- Pelopidas conjunctus conjunctus—conjoined swift
- Pelopidas flavus
- Pelopidas mathias mathias—small branded swift
- Pemara pugnans—pugnacious lancer
- Pirdana distanti distanti
- Pirdana hyela rudolphii
- Pithauria marsena—banded straw ace
- Pithauria murdava
- Pithauria stramineipennis—light straw ace
- Plastingia naga—chequered lancer
- Plastingia pellonia—yellow chequered lancer
- Polytremis discrete discrete
- Polytremis eltola corbeti—yellow-spot swift
- Polytremis lubricans lubricans—contiguous swift
- Polytremis minuta
- Potanthus chloe
- Potanthus confucius dushta—Confucian dart
- Potanthus flavus alcon
- Potanthus ganda ganda
- Potanthus juno juno
- Potanthus lydia fraseri
- Potanthus mingo ajax
- Potanthus omaha omaha—lesser dart
- Potanthus pamela
- Potanthus pava pava—Pava dart
- Potanthus rectifasciatus
- Potanthus serina
- Potanthus trachala tytleri
- Pseudokerana fulgur—orange banded lancer
- Psolos fuligo fuligo—coon
- Pyroneura agnesia
- Pyroneura aurantiaca montivaga
- Pyroneura derna
- Pyroneura flavia fruhstorferi
- Pyroneura helena
- Pyroneura klanga
- Pyroneura latoia latoia—yellow vein lancer
- Pyroneura natuna
- Pyroneura niasana burmana
- Pyroneura perakana perakana
- Quedara monteithi monteithi
- Quedara singularis
- Salanoemia fuscicornis
- Salanoemia sala
- Salanoemia similis
- Salanoemia tavoyana
- Scobura isota
- Scobura phiditia
- Scobura woolletti
- Stimula swinhoei
- Suada swerga suava
- Suastus everyx everyx
- Suastus gremius gremius—palm bob
- Suastus minufus aditia
- Suastus minutus flemingi—small-spot palm bob
- Taractrocera aliena aliena
- Taractrocera archias quinta
- Taractrocera ardonia lamia
- Taractrocera ziclea zenia
- Telicota augias augias—palm dart
- Telicota bambusae bambusae
- Telicota besta bina—Besta palm dart
- Telicota colon stinga—pale palm dart
- Telicota hilda
- Telicota linna
- Telicota ohara jix
- Udaspes folus—grass demon
- Unkana ambasa batara—hoary palmer
- Unkana mytheca mytheca
- Xanthoneura corissa indrasana
- Zela cowani
- Zela elioti
- Zela excellens
- Zela onara solex
- Zela smaragdina
- Zela zenon
- Zela zero
- Zela zeus optima
- Zela zeus zeus
- Zographetus doxus
- Zographetus kutu
- Zographetus ogygia ogygia
- Zographetus ogygioides
- Zographetus rama—small flitter
- Zographetus satwa—purple and gold flitter
- Capita hainana
- Capita phanaeus ferrea
- Capita pieridoides sofa
- Celaenorrhinus asmara asmara
- Celaenorrhinus aurivittatus cameroni—dark yellow-banded flat
- Celaenorrhinus ficulnea queda
- Celaenorrhinus inaequalis irene
- Celaenorrhinus ladana
- Celaenorrhinus leucocera—common spotted flat
- Celaenorrhinus nigricans nigricans
- Celaenorrhinus pahangensis
- Celaenorrhinus putra sanda
- Chamunda chamunda
- Coladenia agni
- Coladenia agnioides
- Coladenia laxmi sobrina
- Coladenia palawana
- Darpa ptena dealbata
- Darpa striata striata
- Gerosis limax dirae—black and white flat
- Gerosis phisara phisara—white-banded flat
- Gerosis sinica minima
- Gerosis tristis
- Mooreana trichoneura trichoneura
- Odina hieroglyphica ortina—hieroglyphic flat
- Odontoptilum angulatum angulatum—chestnut angle
- Odontoptilum pygela pygela—banded angle
- Pintara pinwilli pinwilli
- Pseudocoladenia dan dhyana—fulvous pied flat
- Sarangesa dasahara dasahara
- Satarupa gopala malaya
- Seseria affinis kirmana
- Tagiades calligana
- Tagiades cohaerens cinda
- Tagiades gana gana—large snow flat
- Tagiades japetus atticus—common snow flat
- Tagiades lavatus
- Tagiades litigiosus litigiosus
- Tagiades menaka manis—dark edged snow flat
- Tagiades parra naxos
- Tagiades toba toba
- Tagiades ultra
- Tagiades waterstradti talanga
- Tapena thwaitesi bornea—black angle

== See also ==
- Lee Kong Chian Natural History Museum
- Indomalayan realm
