= Arhopala brooksiana =

Scientific classification
- Kingdom: Animalia
- Phylum: Arthropoda
- Class: Insecta
- Order: Lepidoptera
- Family: Lycaenidae
- Subfamily: Theclinae
- Tribe: Arhopalini
- Genus: Arhopala
- Species: A. brooksiana

Binomial name
- Arhopala brooksiana Corbet, 1941

Synonyms
- Narathura brooksiana

Species of butterfly

Arhopala brooksiana is a butterfly in the family Lycaenidae. It was described by Alexander Steven Corbet in 1941. It is found in West Malaysia and Sumatra. This species is monotypic.

== Description ==
The upperside is similar to Arhopala achelous. The underside is uniform brown with inconspicuous markings.
