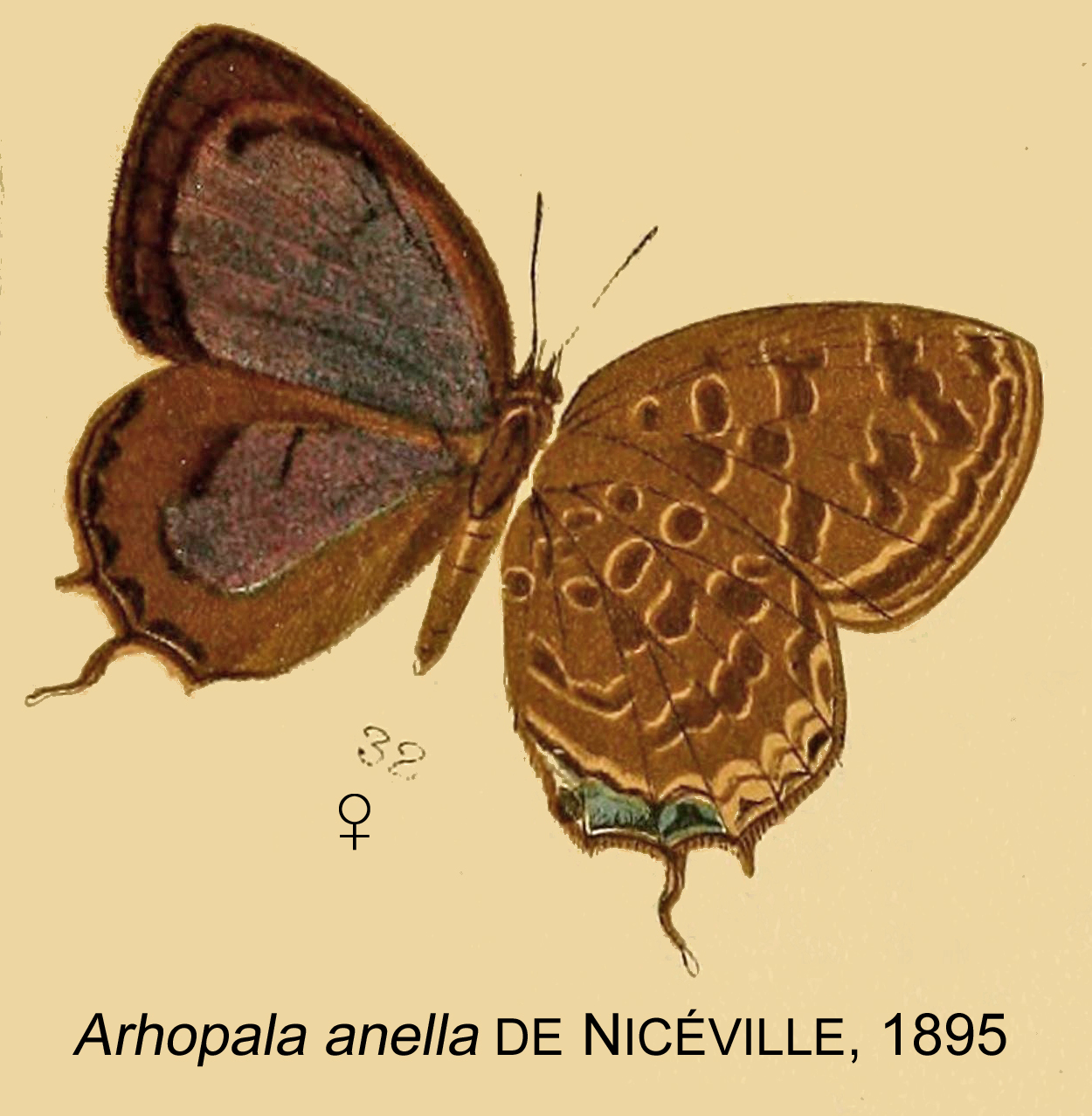

Scientific classification
- Kingdom: Animalia
- Phylum: Arthropoda
- Clade: Pancrustacea
- Class: Insecta
- Order: Lepidoptera
- Family: Lycaenidae
- Genus: Arhopala
- Species: A. anella

Binomial name
- Arhopala anella de Nicéville, 1895

= Arhopala anella =

Species of butterfly

Arhopala anella is a species of butterfly belonging to the lycaenid family. It is found in Southeast Asia (Peninsular Malaya, Sumatra and Borneo).

== Description ==
Similar to irregularisand has also more than 1 small tail, but in the male (the female is unknown [and still not known]}) the bright to violet blue above is more extensive, beneath the ground-colour is paler, more ochreous, the spots are less numerous and more remote from each other.
