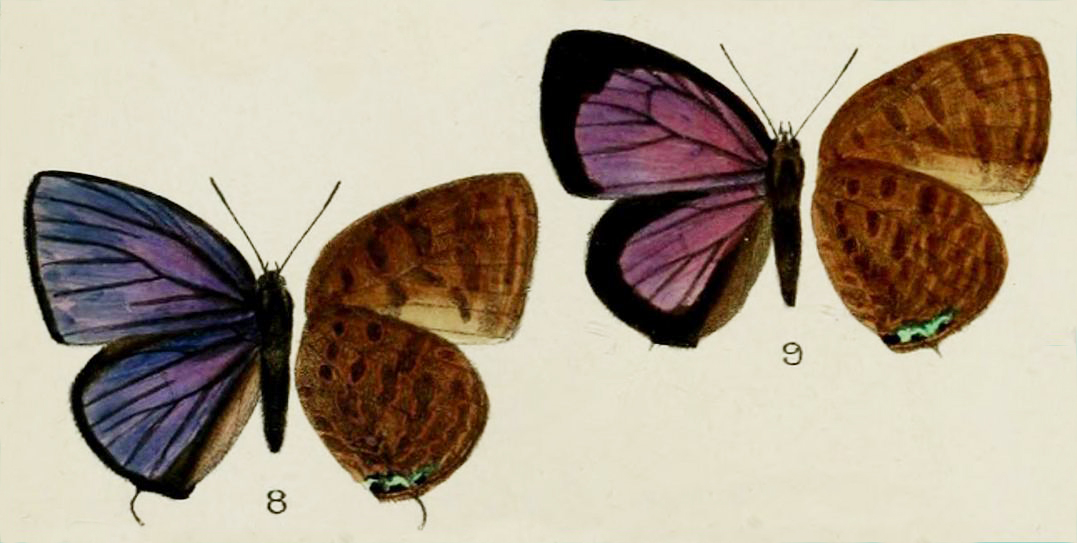
- Arhopala havilandi, male, female, from original description

Scientific classification
- Kingdom: Animalia
- Phylum: Arthropoda
- Clade: Pancrustacea
- Class: Insecta
- Order: Lepidoptera
- Family: Lycaenidae
- Genus: Arhopala
- Species: A. havilandi

Binomial name
- Arhopala havilandi (Bethune-Baker, 1896).

= Arhopala havilandi =

Species of butterfly

Arhopala havilandi is a butterfly in the family Lycaenidae. It was described by George Thomas Bethune-Baker in 1896. It is found in the Indomalayan realm.

A. havilandi is similar to achelous, but the male above darker blue; the markings beneath but slightly darker on the earth-brown ground. The female exhibits a violet reflection, a narrow black costal stripe and a black distal margin of 3 to 4 mm width.

== Subspecies ==
- A. h. havilandi Borneo
- A. h. kota (Evans, 1957) Peninsular Malaya
