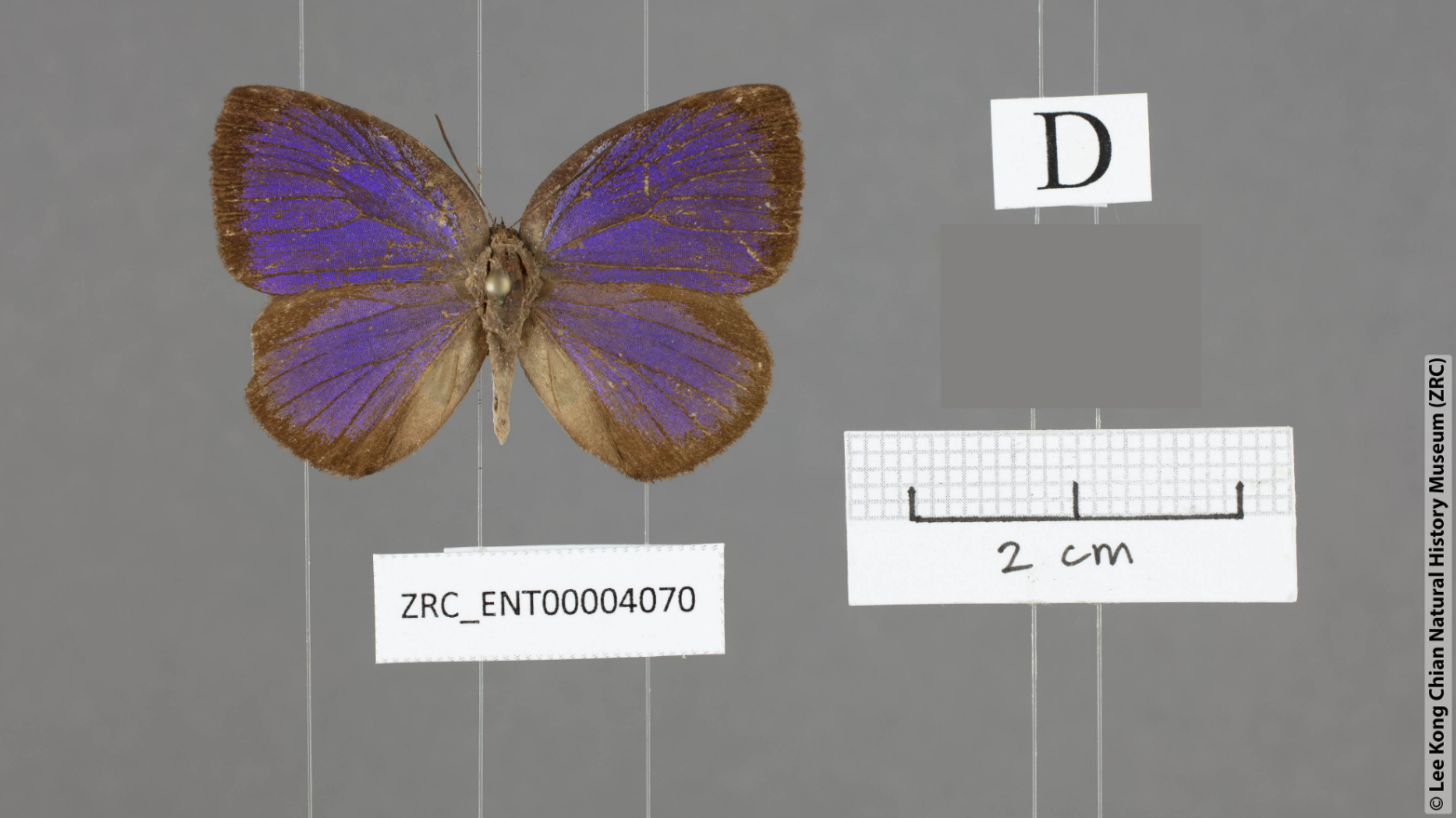
- Upperside
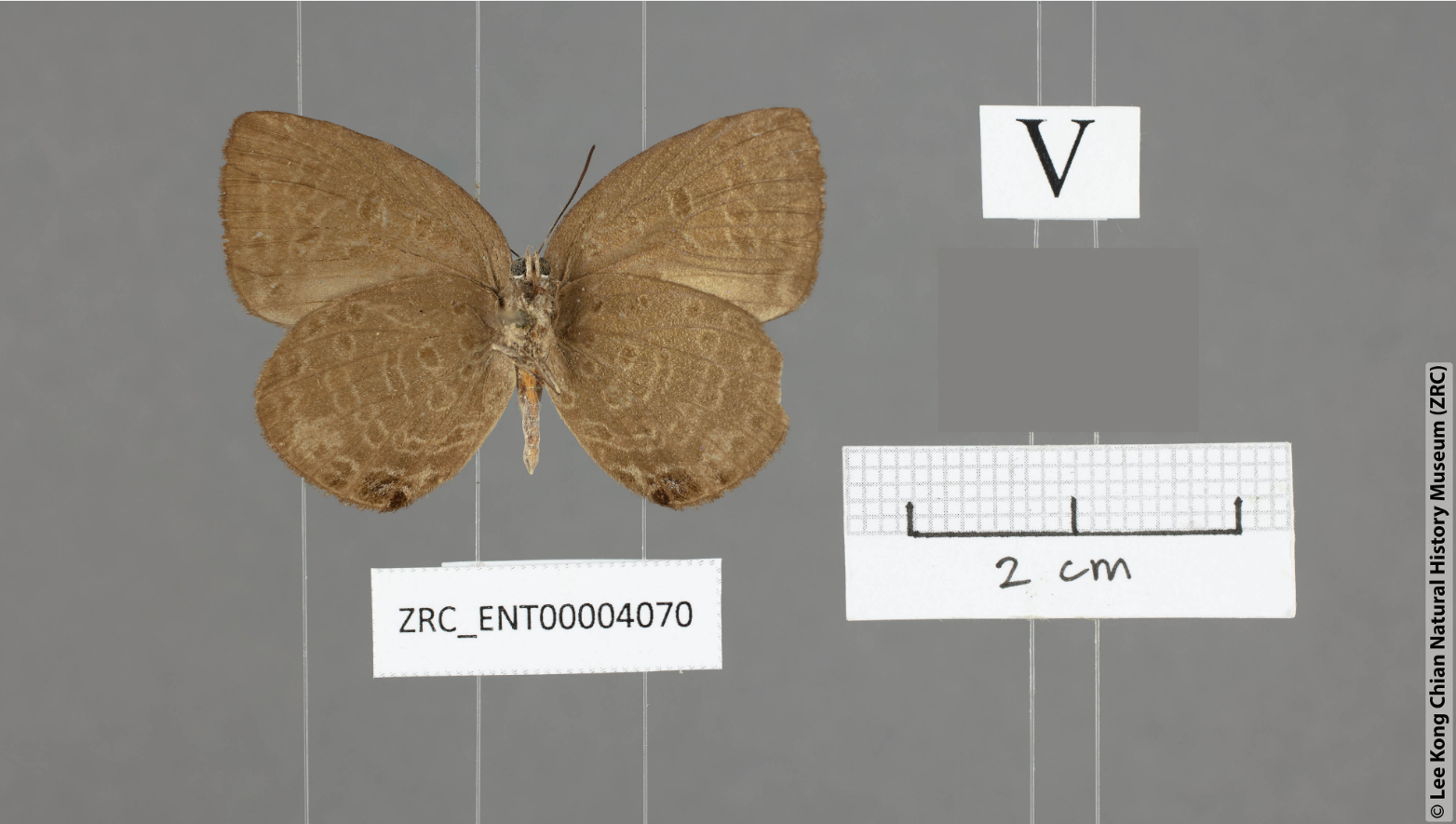
- Underside

Scientific classification
- Kingdom: Animalia
- Phylum: Arthropoda
- Class: Insecta
- Order: Lepidoptera
- Family: Lycaenidae
- Genus: Arhopala
- Species: A. zylda

Binomial name
- Arhopala zylda Corbet, 1941

Synonyms
- Narathura zylda

= Arhopala zylda =

Species of butterfly

Arhopala zylda is a butterfly in the family Lycaenidae. It was discovered by Alexander Steven Corbet in 1941. It is found throughout Malaysia and Indonesia.

== Description ==
It is a small butterfly, with a wingspan of 17 millimeters. The male is slightly smaller (16 millimeters) and its upperside is bright shining blue. It has a narrow black border on the upperside.

== Subspecies ==
Two subspecies are recognised-

- Arhopala zylda zylda Corbet, 1941 - Sumatra
- Arhopala zylda elioti Corbet, 1941 - West Malaysia (darker blue than zylda)

== Habits ==
Arhopala zylda is the only species of Arhopala that exhibit myrmecoxeny despite its host plants being myrmecophytes of Crematogaster decamera (Macaranga beccariana and Macaranga hypoleuca).
