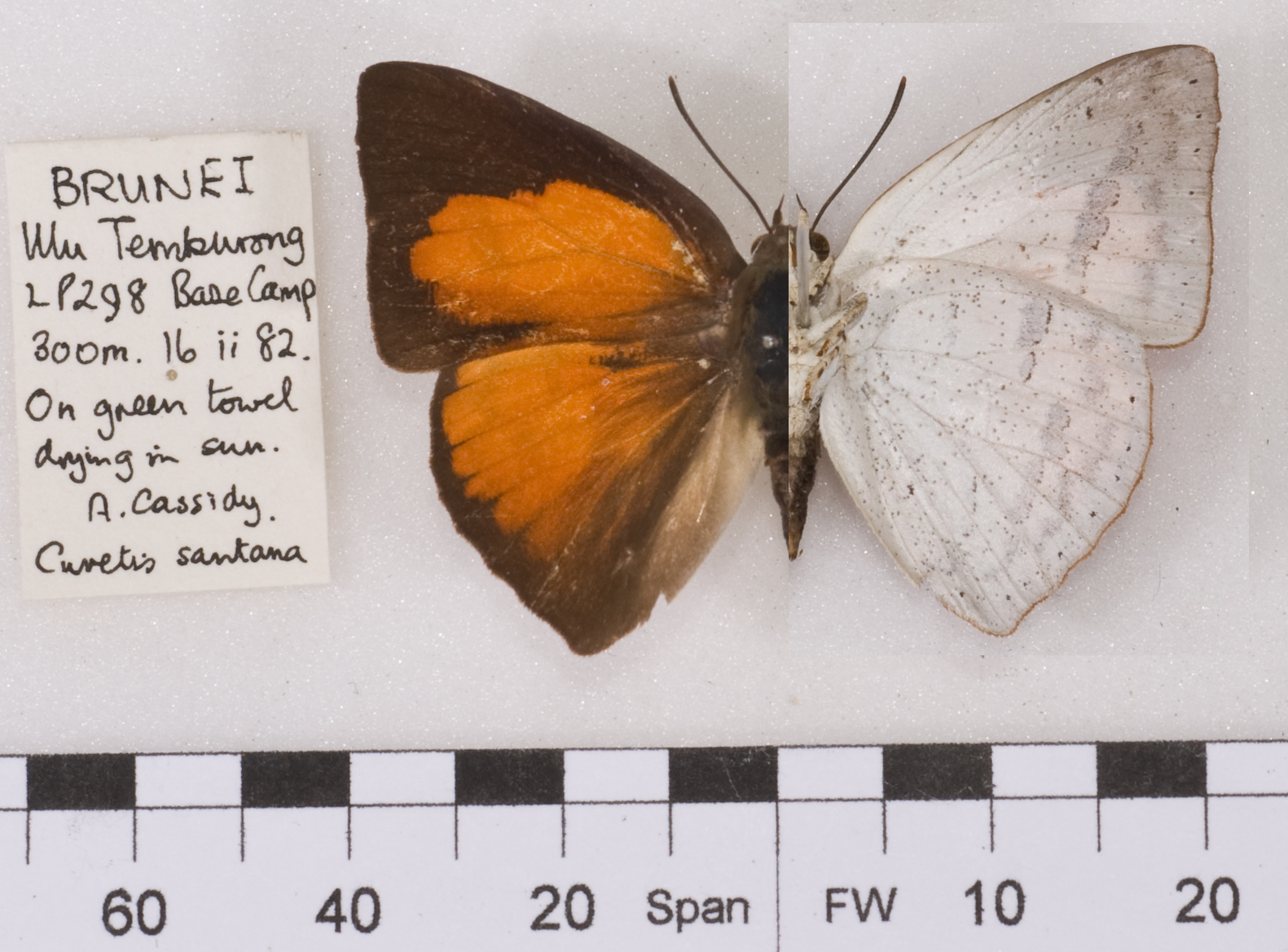
- Curetis santana malayica

Scientific classification
- Domain: Eukaryota
- Kingdom: Animalia
- Phylum: Arthropoda
- Class: Insecta
- Order: Lepidoptera
- Family: Lycaenidae
- Genus: Curetis
- Species: C. santana

Binomial name
- Curetis santana (Moore, 1857)

Synonyms
- Anops santana Moore, [1858]; Curetis argentata Toxopeus, 1935; Curetis malajica ge Fruhstorfer, 1900; Anops malayica C. Felder & R. Felder, [1865]; Curetis sanatana malayica f. honesta Fruhstorfer, 1908

= Curetis santana =

Species of butterfly

Curetis santana is a species of butterfly belonging to the family Lycaenidae. It was described by Frederic Moore in 1857. It is found in Southeast Asia (Myanmar, Indochina, Peninsular Malaya, Thailand, Sumatra, Bangka and Borneo).

== Subspecies ==
- Curetis santana santana (Java)
- Curetis santana ge Fruhstorfer, 1900 (Nias)
- Curetis santana malayica (C. Felder & R. Felder, [1865]) – Malayan sunbeam (northern Myanmar, Indochina to Peninsular Malaysia, Thailand, Sumatra, Bangka, Borneo)
