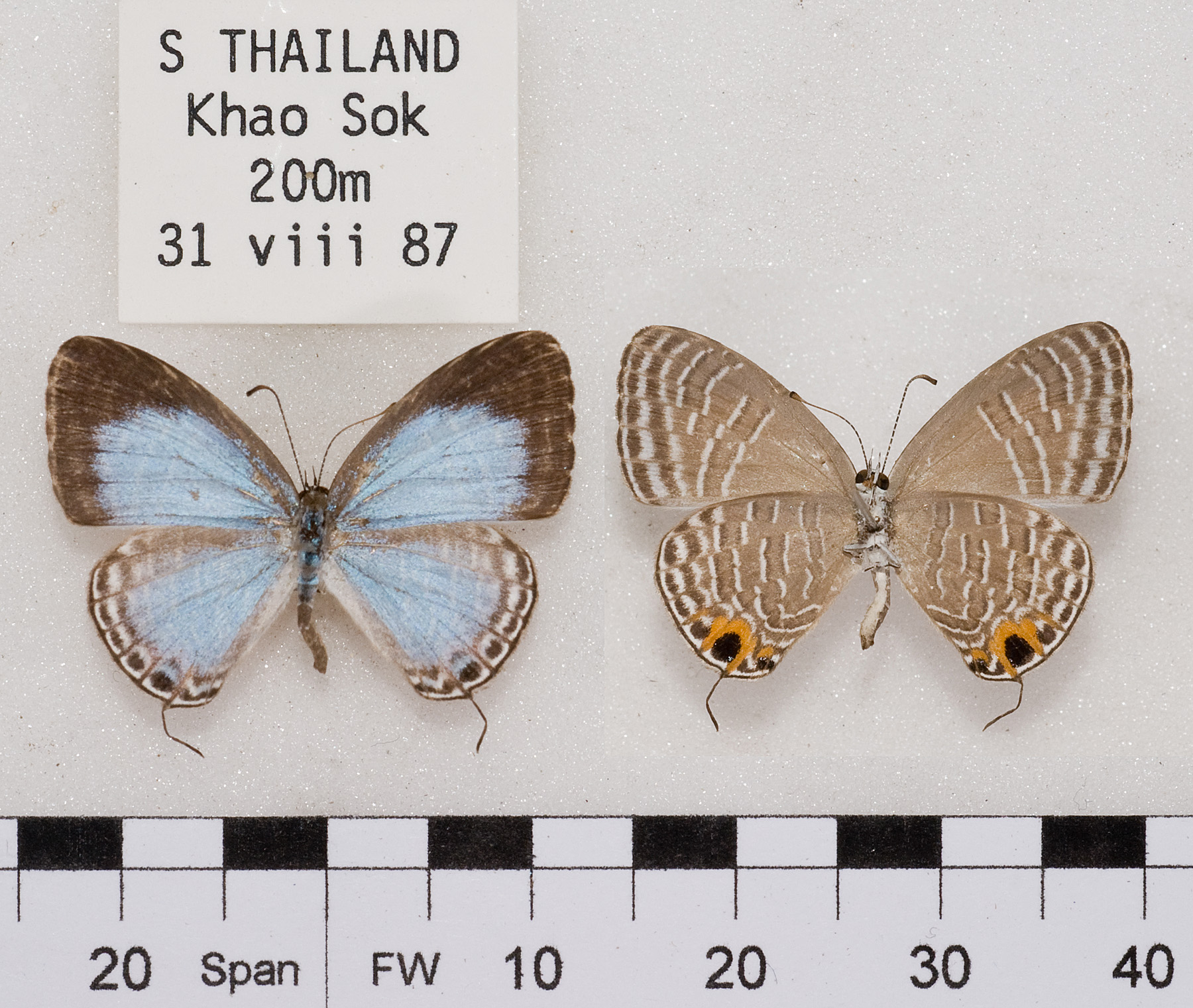

Scientific classification
- Domain: Eukaryota
- Kingdom: Animalia
- Phylum: Arthropoda
- Class: Insecta
- Order: Lepidoptera
- Family: Lycaenidae
- Genus: Jamides
- Species: J. abdul

Binomial name
- Jamides abdul (Distant, 1886)

Synonyms
- Lampides abdul Distant, 1886; Lampides marakata Doherty, 1890; Lampides abdul hamid Fruhstorfer, 1916; Plebeius (Lampides) daonides Röber, 1897; Lampides daones Druce, 1896

= Jamides abdul =

Species of butterfly

Jamides abdul is a butterfly in the family Lycaenidae. It was described by William Lucas Distant in 1886. It is found in the Indomalayan realm.

== Subspecies ==
- Jamides abdul abdul (Peninsular Malaysia, Sumatra, Thailand)
- Jamides abdul hamid (Fruhstorfer, 1916) (Nias)
- Jamides abdul daonides (Röber, 1897) (Java)
- Jamides abdul daones (Druce, 1896) (Borneo)
- Jamides abdul pemanggilensis Eliot, 1978 (Pulau Pemanggil)
- Jamides abdul mayaangelae Takanami, 1992 (Simeulue Islands)
