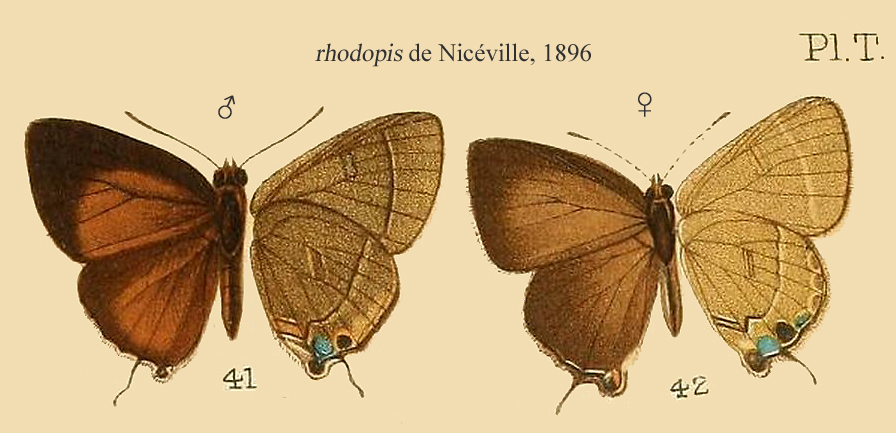

Scientific classification
- Domain: Eukaryota
- Kingdom: Animalia
- Phylum: Arthropoda
- Class: Insecta
- Order: Lepidoptera
- Family: Lycaenidae
- Genus: Rapala
- Species: R. rhodopis

Binomial name
- Rapala rhodopis de Nicéville, 1889

= Rapala rhodopis =

Species of butterfly

Rapala rhodopis is a butterfly in the family Lycaenidae. It was described by Lionel de Nicéville in 1889. It is found in the Indomalayan realm, where it has been recorded from Sumatra and Peninsular Malaysia.
