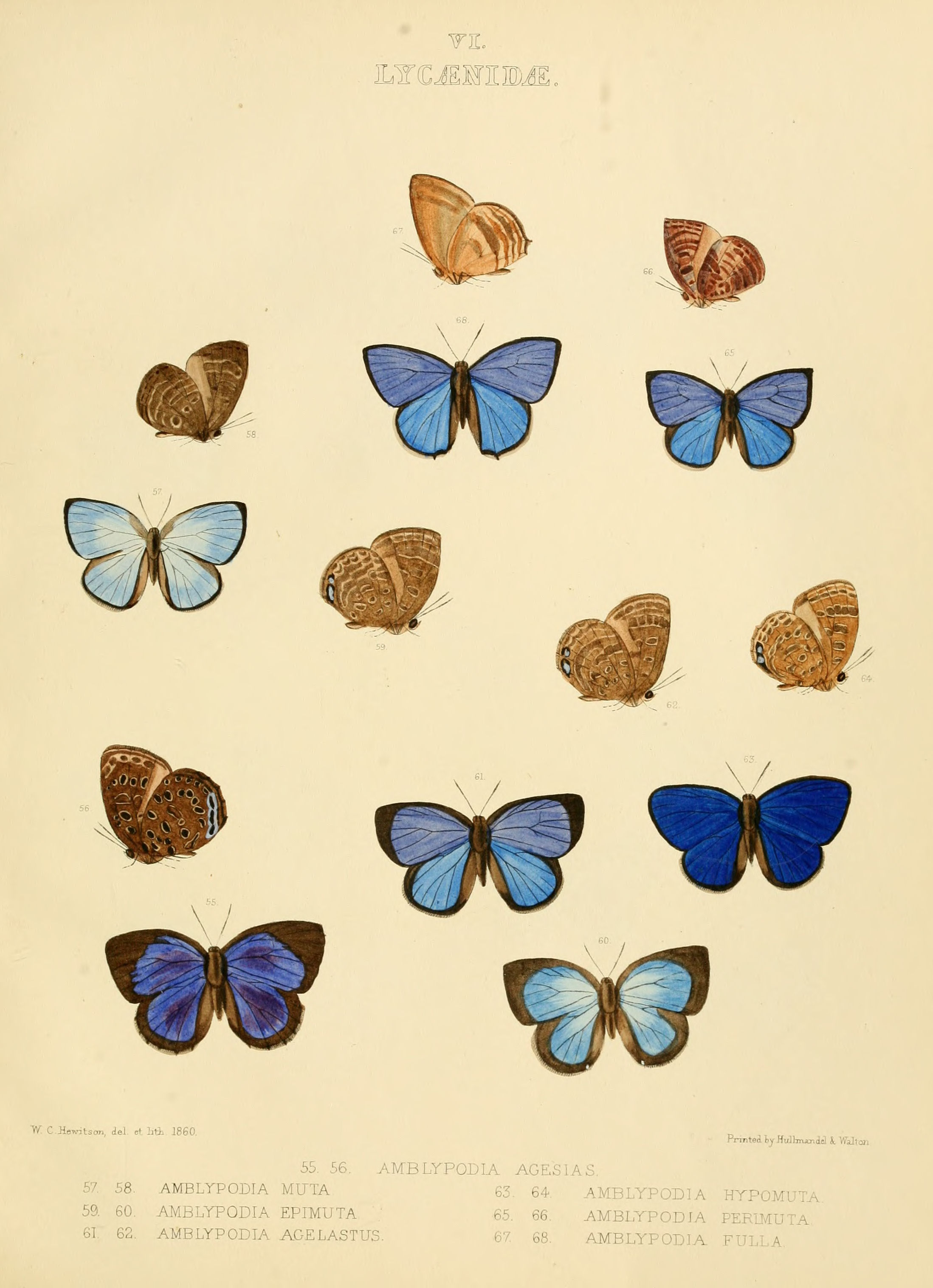
- Figures 61 and 62 in Illustrations of Diurnal Lepidoptera

Scientific classification
- Kingdom: Animalia
- Phylum: Arthropoda
- Clade: Pancrustacea
- Class: Insecta
- Order: Lepidoptera
- Family: Lycaenidae
- Genus: Arhopala
- Species: A. agelastus

Binomial name
- Arhopala agelastus (Hewitson, 1862)

Synonyms
- Amblypodia agelastus Hewitson, 1862; Arhopala perissa Doherty, 1889

= Arhopala agelastus =

Species of butterfly

Arhopala agelastus is a species of butterfly belong to the lycaenid family described by William Chapman Hewitson in 1862. It is found in Southeast Asia (Peninsular Malaya, Langkawi, Singapore and ssp. perissa Doherty, 1889 Burma, Mergui and Thailand).

Males have ultramarine blue wings. The postmedian band of the forewing beneath is not so uniform and is more distinctly composed of separate spots. A. a. perissa is very similar to related forms which are difficult to separate from this species.

== Subspecies ==
- Arhopala agelastus agelastus (Peninsular Malaysia, Langkawi, Singapore)
- Arhopala agelastus perissa Doherty, 1889 (southern Burma, Mergui, southern Thailand)
