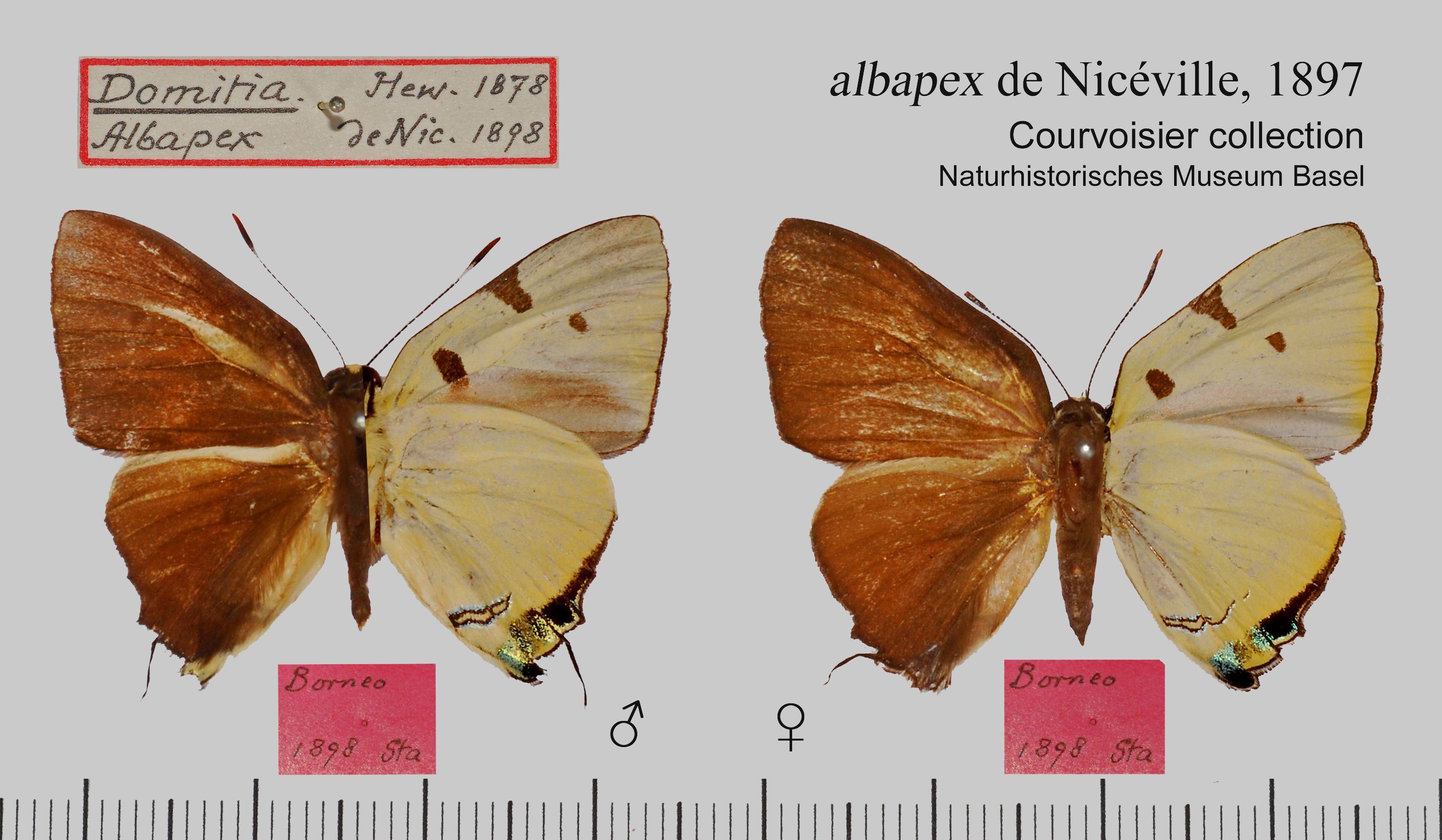
- Rapala domitia albapex Courvoisier Collection, Basel

Scientific classification
- Kingdom: Animalia
- Phylum: Arthropoda
- Class: Insecta
- Order: Lepidoptera
- Family: Lycaenidae
- Genus: Rapala
- Species: R. domitia

Binomial name
- Rapala domitia (Hewitson, [1863])

Synonyms
- Deudorix domitia Hewitson, 1863; Rapala albapex de Nicéville, 1897

= Rapala domitia =

Species of butterfly

Rapala domitia is a butterfly in the family Lycaenidae. It was described by William Chapman Hewitson in 1863. It is found in the Indomalayan realm.

== Subspecies ==
- Rapala domitia domitia (Peninsular Malaysia, Singapore)
- Rapala domitia flemingi Eliot, 1969 (Langkawi, possibly southern Thailand)
- Rapala domitia albapex de Nicéville, 1897 (Borneo)
