= Arhopala johoreana =

Scientific classification
- Kingdom: Animalia
- Phylum: Arthropoda
- Clade: Pancrustacea
- Class: Insecta
- Order: Lepidoptera
- Family: Lycaenidae
- Genus: Arhopala
- Species: A. johoreana

Binomial name
- Arhopala johoreana Corbet, 1941

Synonyms
- Narathura johoreana kalima Evans, 1957

Species of butterfly

Arhopala johoreana is a butterfly in the family Lycaenidae. It was described by Alexander Steven Corbet in 1941. It is found in Malaysia and on Nias.

== Subspecies ==
- Arhopala johoreana johoreana (Malaysia)
- Arhopala johoreana kalima Evans, 1957 (Nias)
