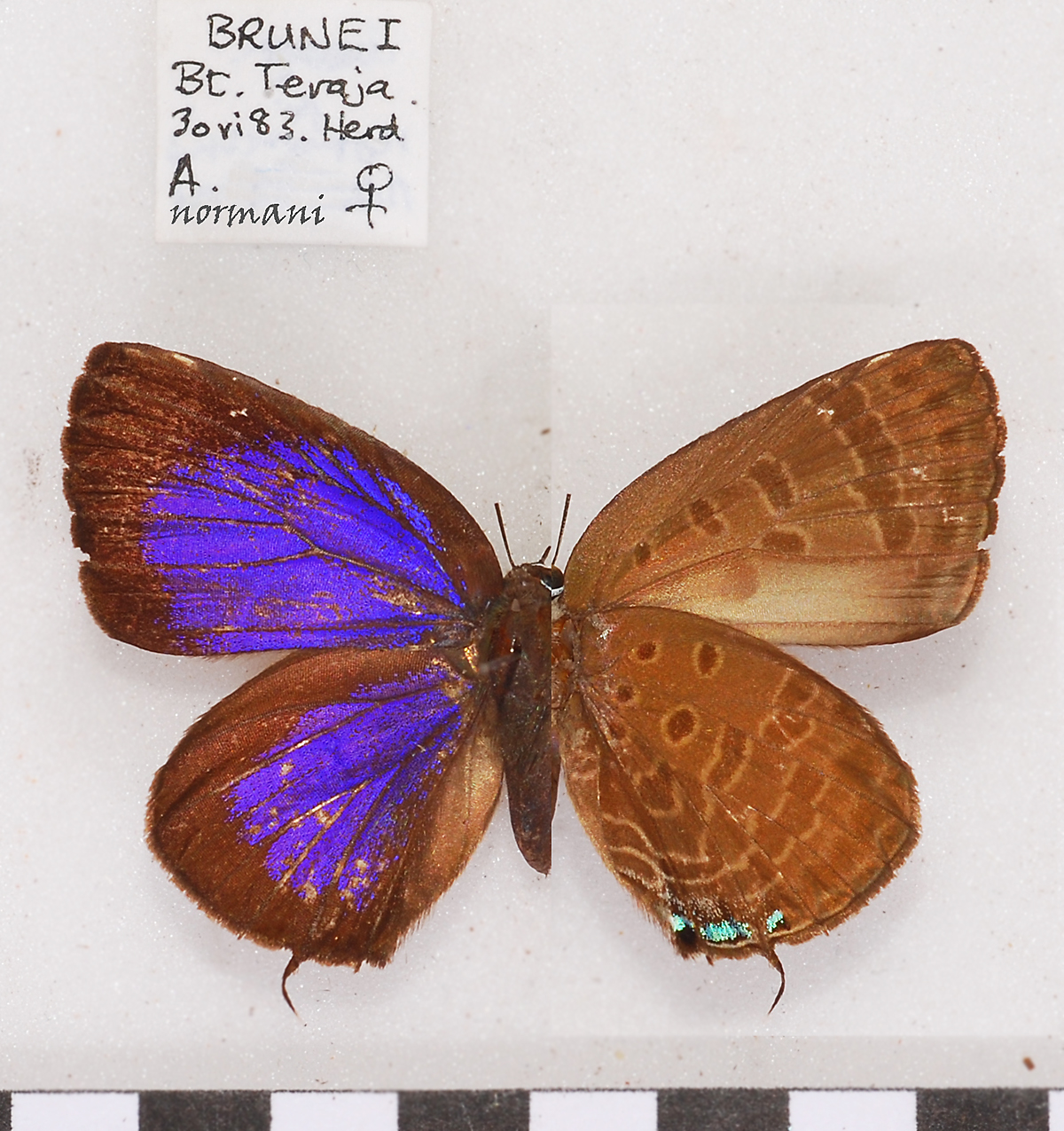

Scientific classification
- Kingdom: Animalia
- Phylum: Arthropoda
- Clade: Pancrustacea
- Class: Insecta
- Order: Lepidoptera
- Family: Lycaenidae
- Genus: Arhopala
- Species: A. normani

Binomial name
- Arhopala normani Eliot, 1972.

= Arhopala normani =

Species of butterfly

Arhopala normani is a species of butterfly belonging to the lycaenid family. It is found in Southeast Asia (Peninsular Malaya, Sumatra).
