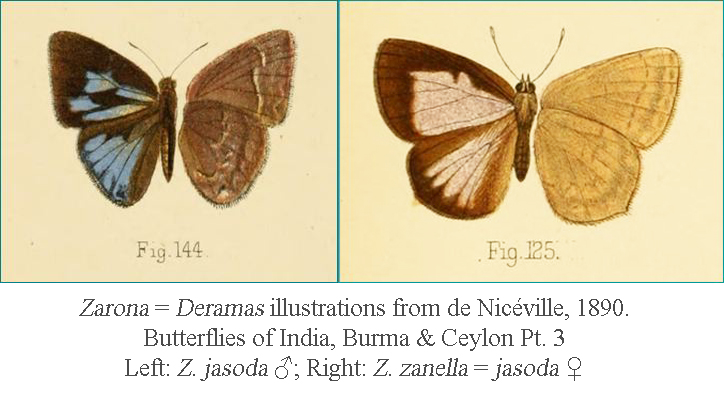

Scientific classification
- Kingdom: Animalia
- Phylum: Arthropoda
- Class: Insecta
- Order: Lepidoptera
- Family: Lycaenidae
- Genus: Deramas
- Species: D. jasoda

Binomial name
- Deramas jasoda (de Nicéville, [1889])

= Deramas jasoda =

Species of butterfly

Deramas jasoda is a butterfly in the family Lycaenidae. It was described by Lionel de Niceville in 1889. It is found in the Indomalayan realm.On the underside the light area behind the postmedian line is not noticeable as a band, instead of it the dark crescents forming the dark postmedian stripe are distally filled up with light.

== Subspecies ==
- D. j. jasoda – de Nicéville, 1889 (Burma, Thailand, Mergui, Langkawi)
- D. j. bradamante – Doherty, 1890 (Peninsular Malaya, Borneo, Sumatra)
- D. j. herdi – Cassidy, 1985 (Brunei)
