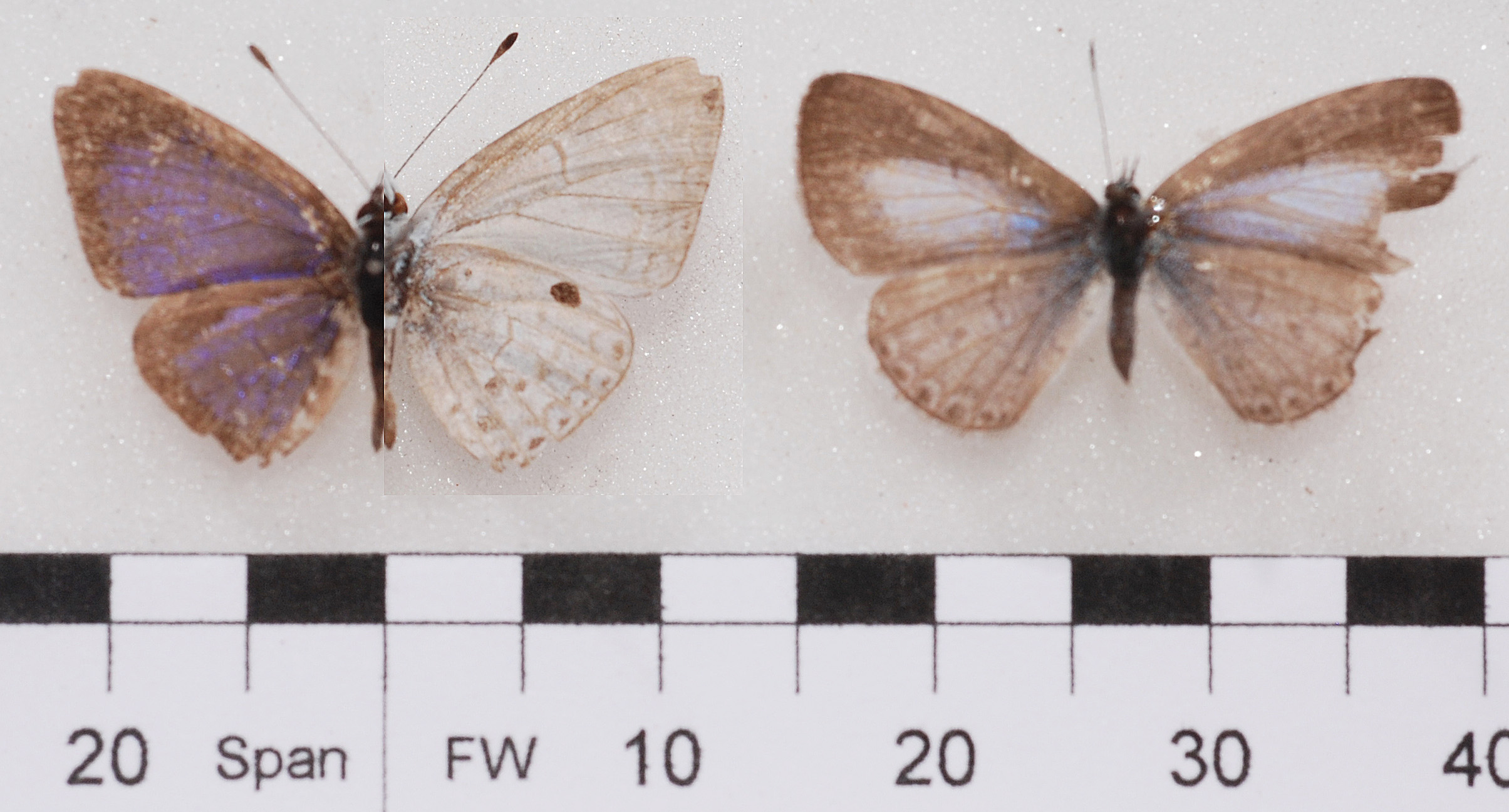

Scientific classification
- Domain: Eukaryota
- Kingdom: Animalia
- Phylum: Arthropoda
- Class: Insecta
- Order: Lepidoptera
- Family: Lycaenidae
- Genus: Cebrella
- Species: C. pellecebra

Binomial name
- Cebrella pellecebra (Fruhstorfer, 1910)

Synonyms
- Cyaniris pellecebra Fruhstorfer, 1910; Lycaenopsis moultoni Chapman, 1911; Lycaenopsis (Neopithecops) oskewa Moulton, 1911

= Cebrella pellecebra =

Species of butterfly

Cebrella pellecebra, the three-spotted hedge blue, is a species of butterfly belonging to the lycaenid family described by Hans Fruhstorfer in 1910. It is found in Southeast Asia.

== Subspecies ==
- Cebrella pellecebra pellecebra (Thailand, Malay Peninsula, Sumatra)
- Cebrella pellecebra moultoni Chapman, 1911 (Sarawak)
