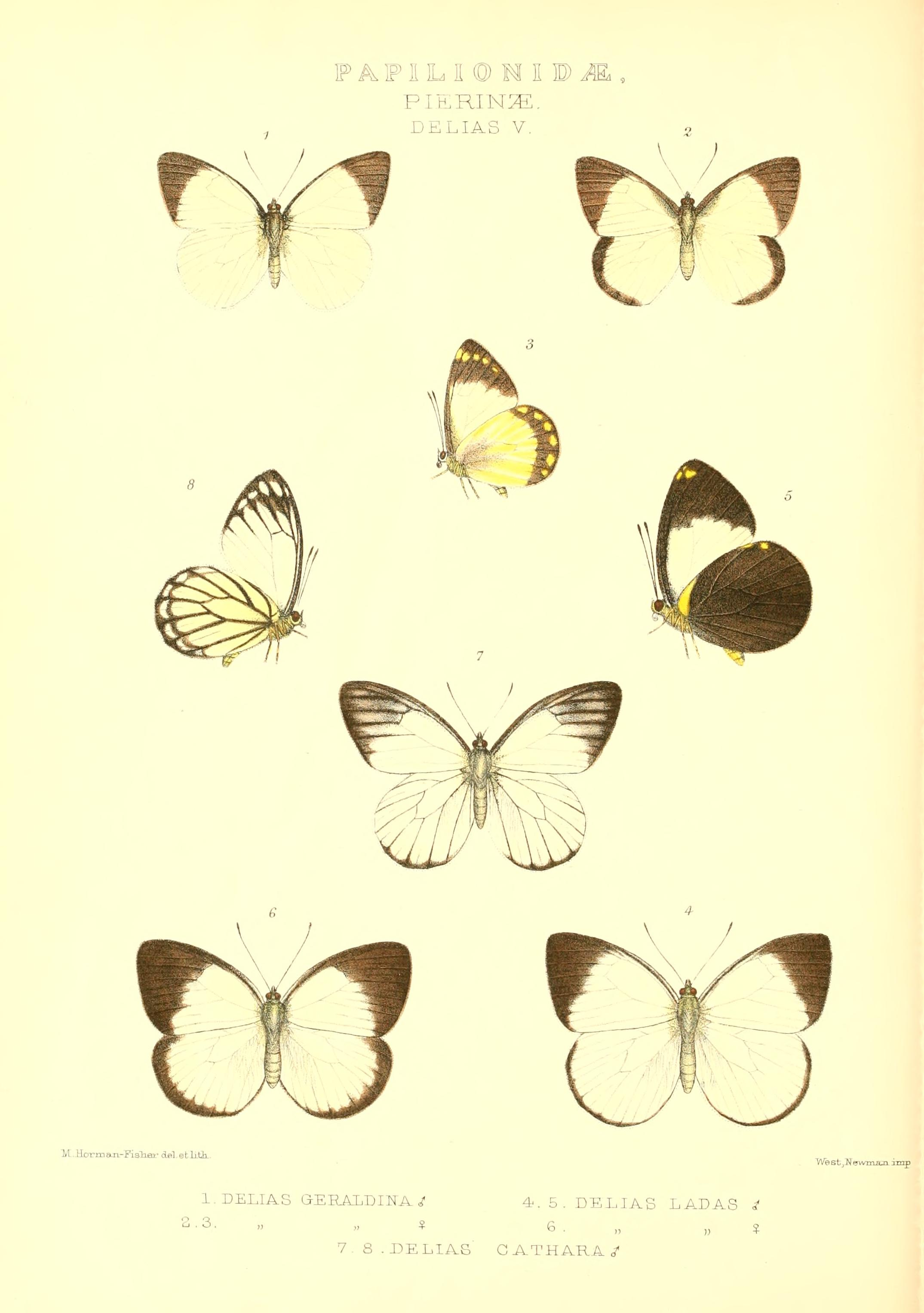
- Delias baracasa in Grose-Smith, H. & Kirby, W.F. Rhopalocera exotica

Scientific classification
- Kingdom: Animalia
- Phylum: Arthropoda
- Clade: Pancrustacea
- Class: Insecta
- Order: Lepidoptera
- Family: Pieridae
- Genus: Delias
- Species: D. baracasa

Binomial name
- Delias baracasa Semper, 1890

Synonyms
- Delias karo Hagen, 1894; Delias dives de Nicéville, 1897; Delias danala de Nicéville, 1893; Delias cathara Grose-Smith, 1893

= Delias baracasa =

Species of butterfly

Delias baracasa is a butterfly in the family Pieridae. It was described by Georg Semper in 1890. It is found in the Indomalayan realm.

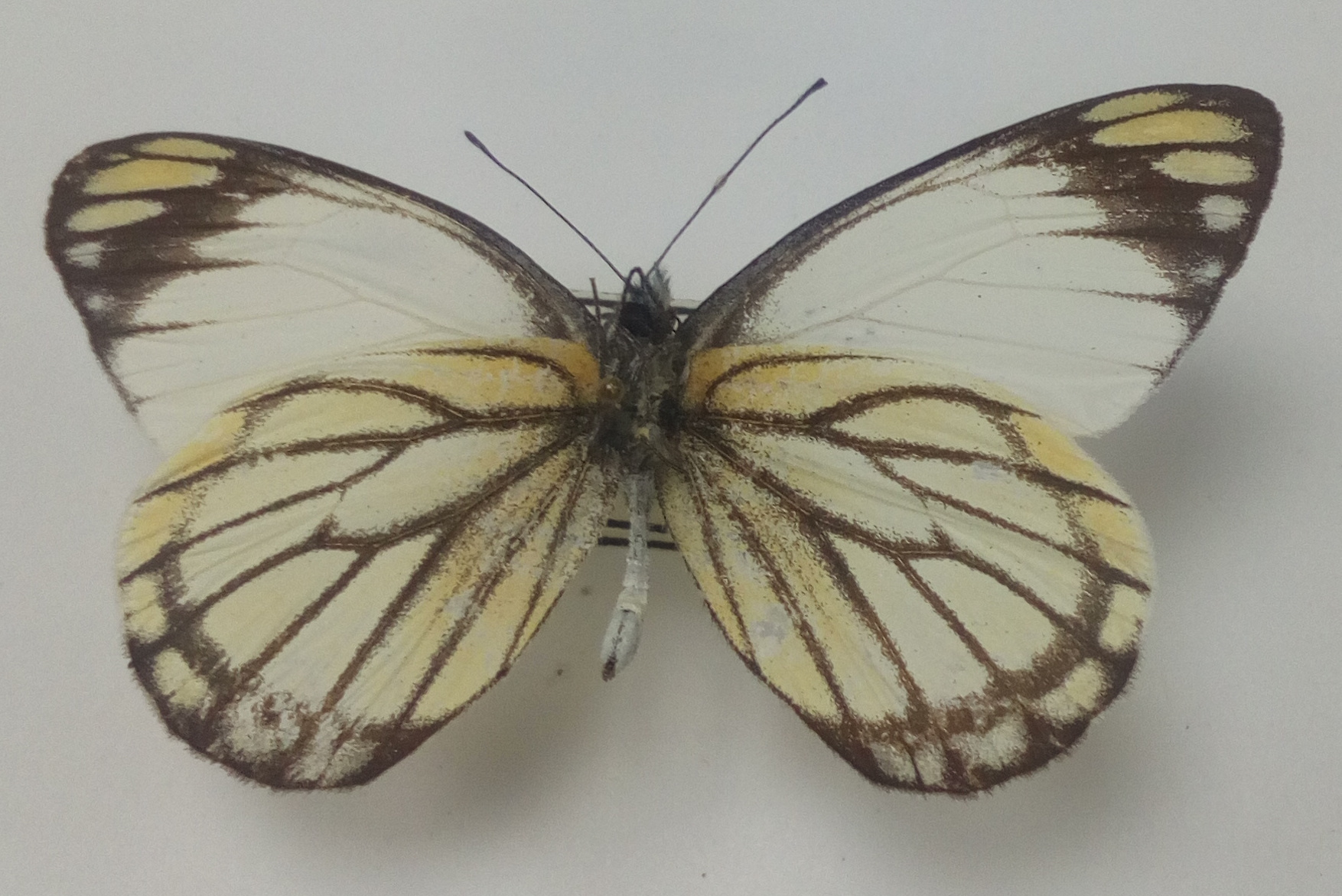

The wingspan is about 50 mm. It is in the agostina group. Within that it may be distinguished by the blackened vein markings on the underside of the hindwings.

== Subspecies ==
- D. b. baracasa (Malaysia, Philippines: Mindanao)
- D. b. basilana Schroeder & Treadaway, 2008 (Philippines: Basilan)
- D. b. benguetana Inomata, 1979 (Philippines)
- D. b. cathara Grose-Smith, 1893 (Borneo)
- D. b. danala (de Nicéville, 1893) (north-eastern Sumatra, south-western Sumatra)
- D. b. dives de Nicéville, 1897 (Peninsular Malaysia)
- D. b. kalimantana Yagishita, 1993 (western Kalimantan: Mt.Saran)
