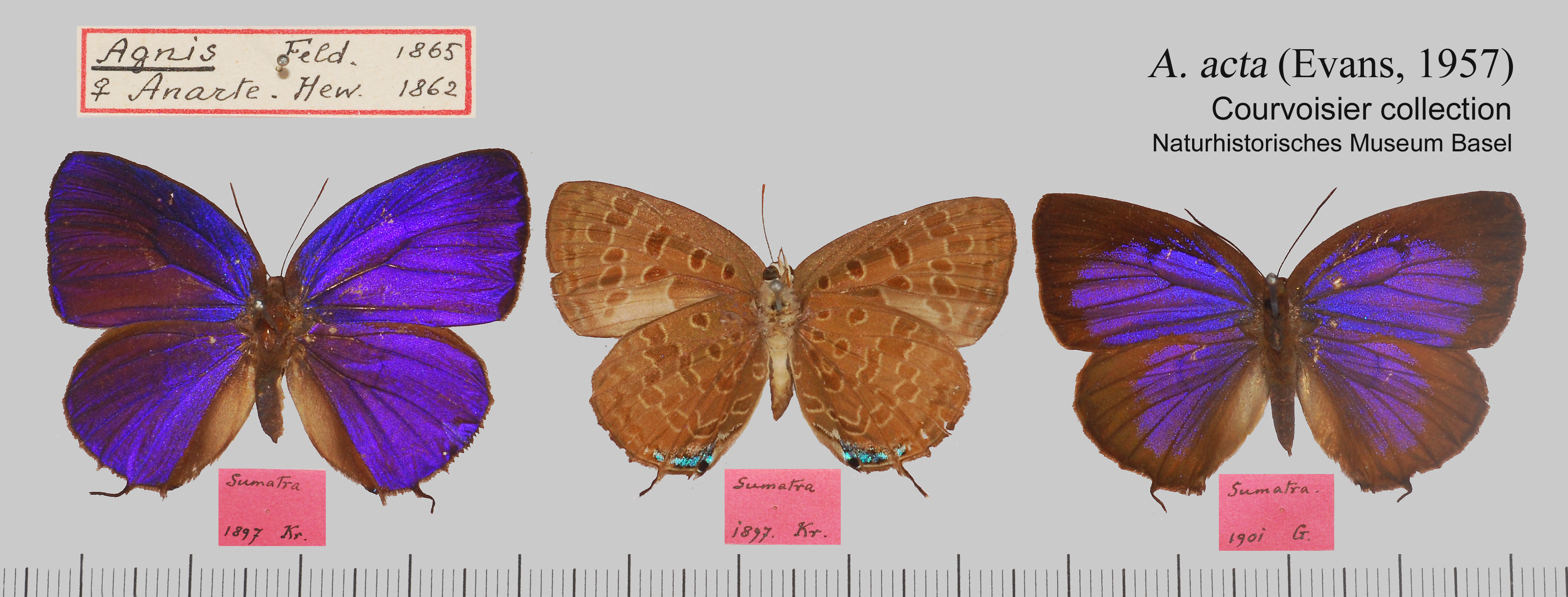

Scientific classification
- Kingdom: Animalia
- Phylum: Arthropoda
- Clade: Pancrustacea
- Class: Insecta
- Order: Lepidoptera
- Family: Lycaenidae
- Genus: Arhopala
- Species: A. acta

Binomial name
- Arhopala acta (Evans, 1957)

Synonyms
- Narathura tameanga acta Evans, 1957

= Arhopala acta =

Species of butterfly

Arhopala acta is a species of butterfly belonging to the lycaenid family described by William Harry Evans in 1957. It is found in Southeast Asia (Sumatra and Peninsular Malaya).
