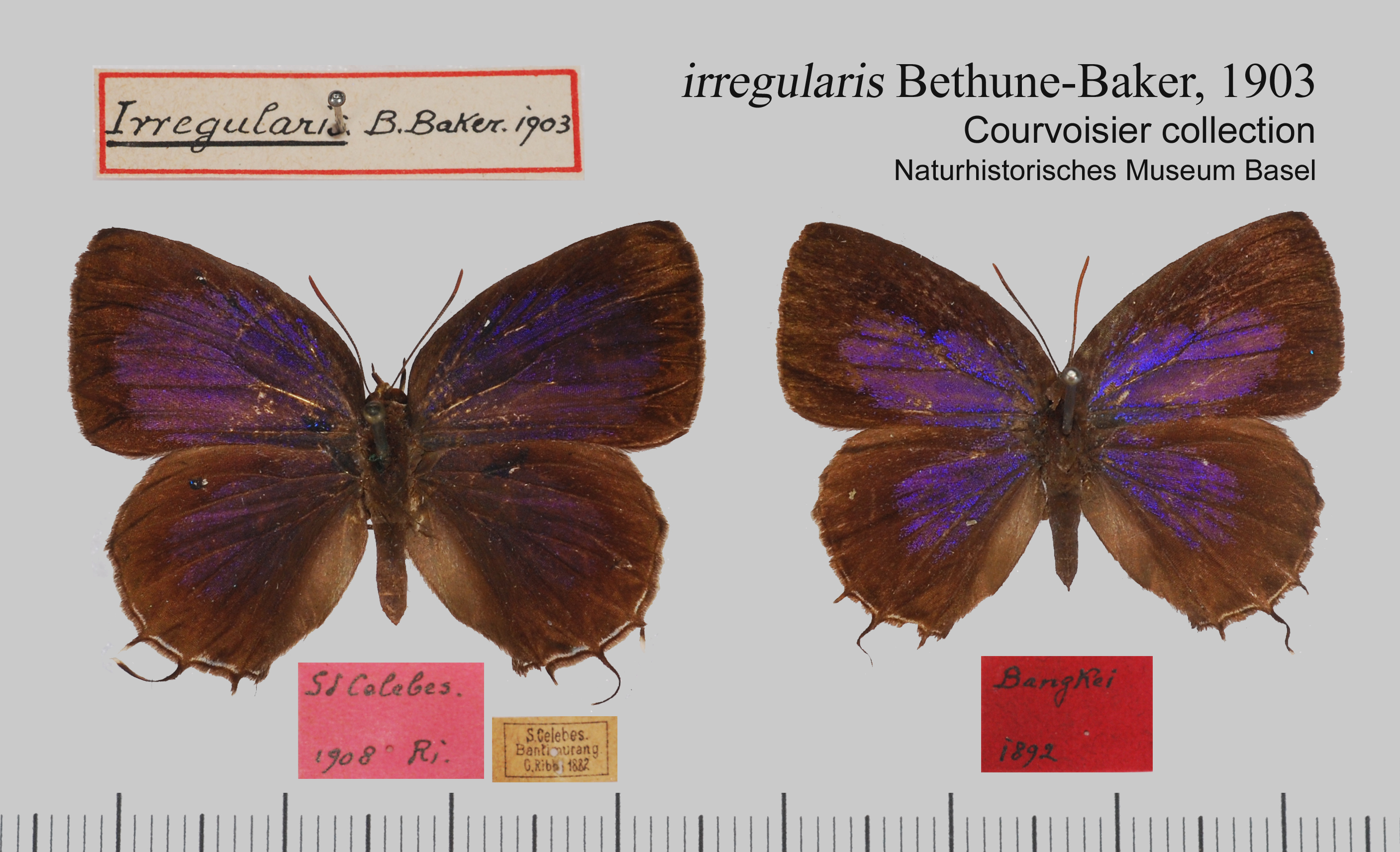
- Arhopala irregularis Courvoisier Collection, Basel

Scientific classification
- Kingdom: Animalia
- Phylum: Arthropoda
- Clade: Pancrustacea
- Class: Insecta
- Order: Lepidoptera
- Family: Lycaenidae
- Genus: Arhopala
- Species: A. irregularis

Binomial name
- Arhopala irregularis Bethune-Baker, 1903

= Arhopala irregularis =

Species of butterfly

Arhopala irregularis is a butterfly in the family Lycaenidae. It was described by George Thomas Bethune-Baker in 1903. It is found in Sulawesi and Banggai in the Australasian realm.

== Description ==
irregularis is similar to the preceding species, but considerably larger, the marking beneath also very irregular, though not so variegated as in abseus; the male above has a broader dark marginal band and a very dark blue on the upper surface.
