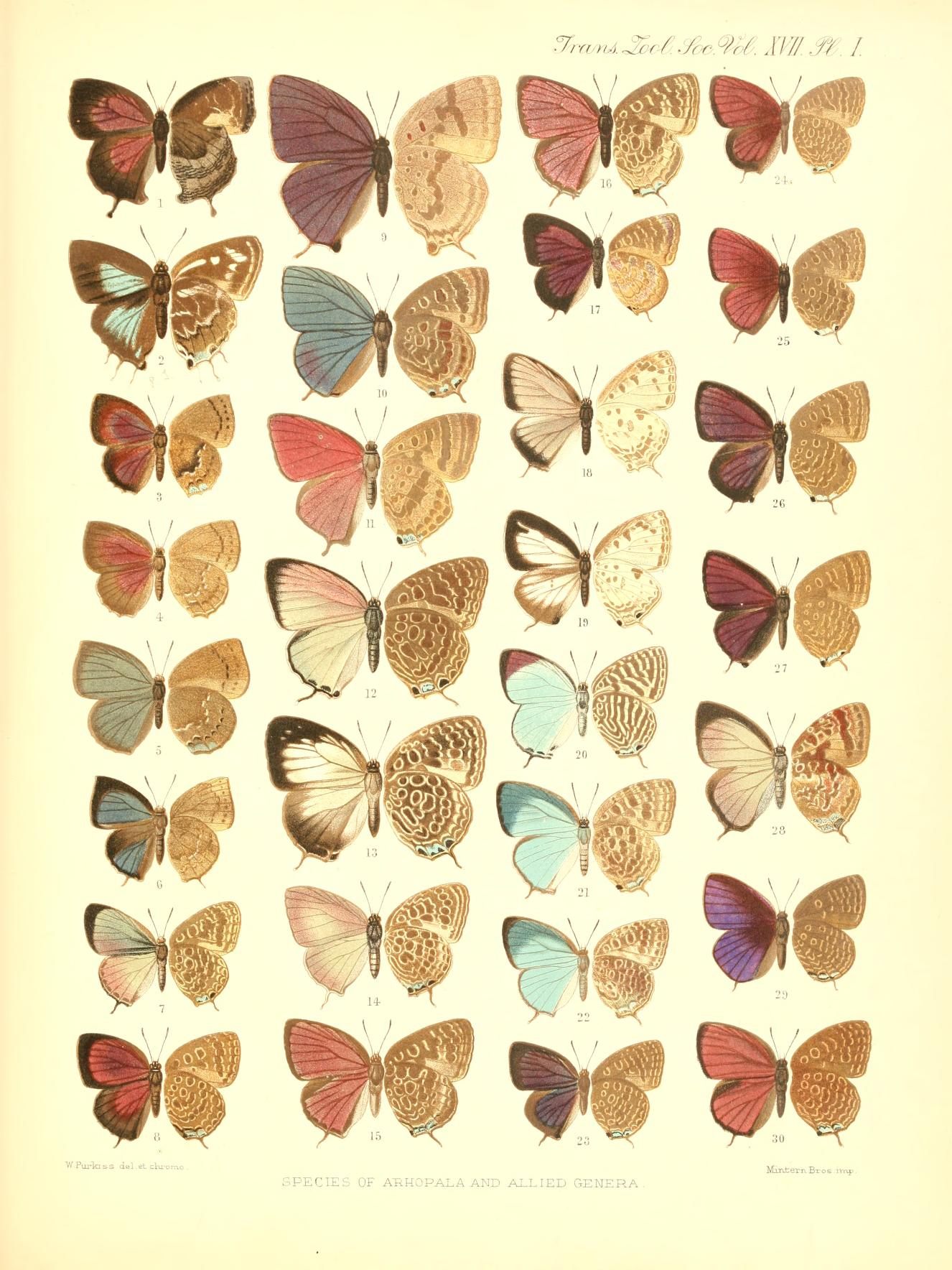
- Arhopala ijanensis in Bethune-Baker, 1903 A Revision of the Amblypodia Group Fig 28

Scientific classification
- Kingdom: Animalia
- Phylum: Arthropoda
- Clade: Pancrustacea
- Class: Insecta
- Order: Lepidoptera
- Family: Lycaenidae
- Genus: Arhopala
- Species: A. ijanensis

Binomial name
- Arhopala ijanensis Bethune-Baker, 1897

= Arhopala ijanensis =

Species of butterfly

Arhopala ijanensis is a butterfly in the family Lycaenidae. It was described by George Thomas Bethune-Baker in 1897. It is found in the Indomalayan realm (Burma, Thailand, Peninsular Malaya, Mergui, and Langkawi).

Easily recognized by the smalt blue upper surface, and the under surface being bright dark brown on a light ochreous-brown ground.
