= Arhopala sceva =

Scientific classification
- Kingdom: Animalia
- Phylum: Arthropoda
- Class: Insecta
- Order: Lepidoptera
- Family: Lycaenidae
- Genus: Arhopala
- Species: A. sceva

Binomial name
- Arhopala sceva Bethune-Baker, 1903

Synonyms
- Narathura sceva

Species of butterfly

Arhopala sceva is a butterfly in the family Lycaenidae. It was discovered by George Thomas Bethune-Baker in 1903. It is found in Sumatra and Borneo.

== Description ==
The male's upperside is purple with a reddish tint or a brownish shade when viewed from an angle. Underside is warm greyish brown with the darker spots palely encircled. The female is violet, with the underside similar to that of the male. The wingspan is 19 millimeters.

== Subspecies ==
Two subspecies are recognized-

- Arhopala sceva sceva Bethune-Baker, 1903 - Sumatra
- Arhopala sceva indra Evans, 1957 - Borneo
