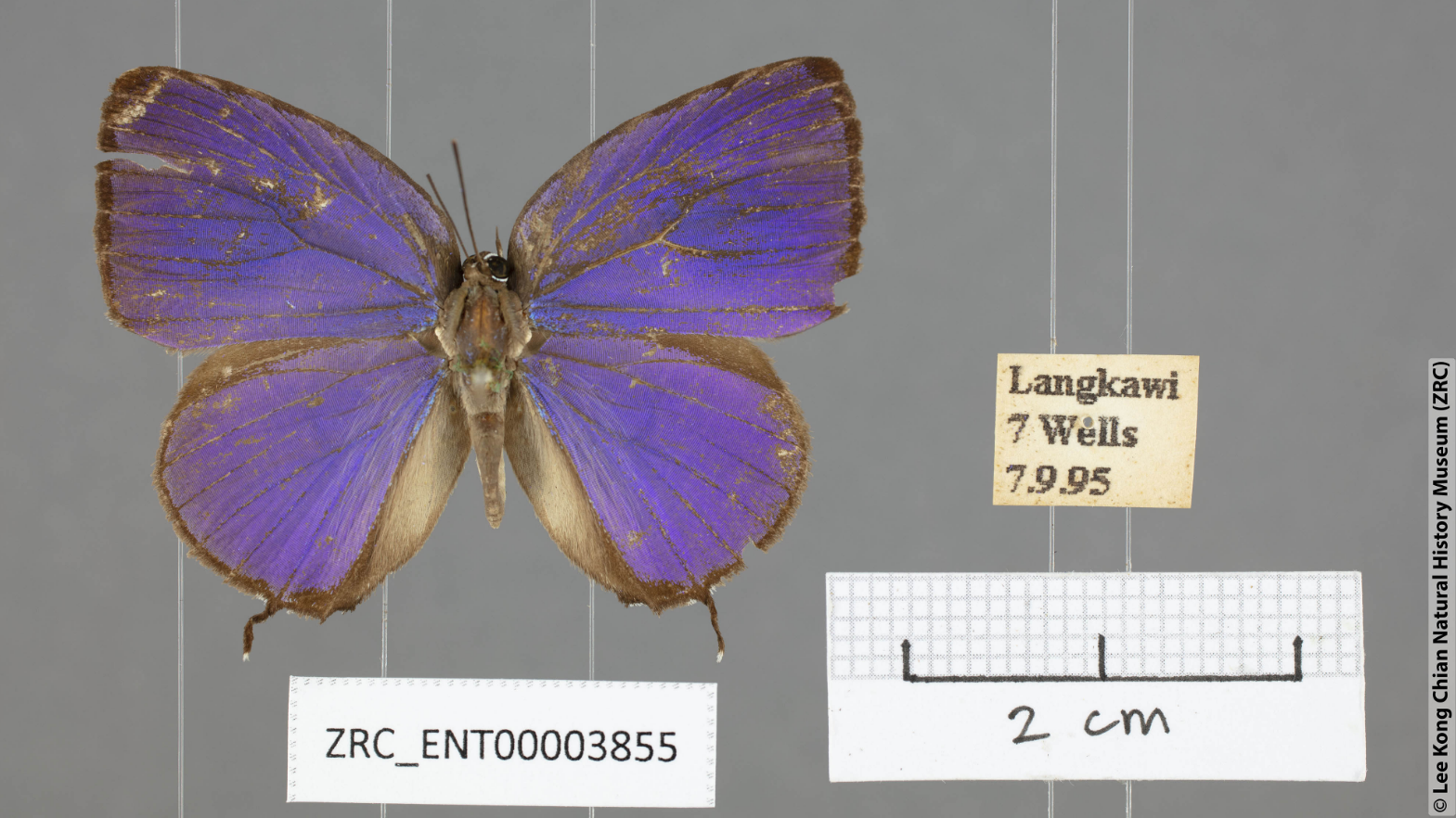
- Upperside
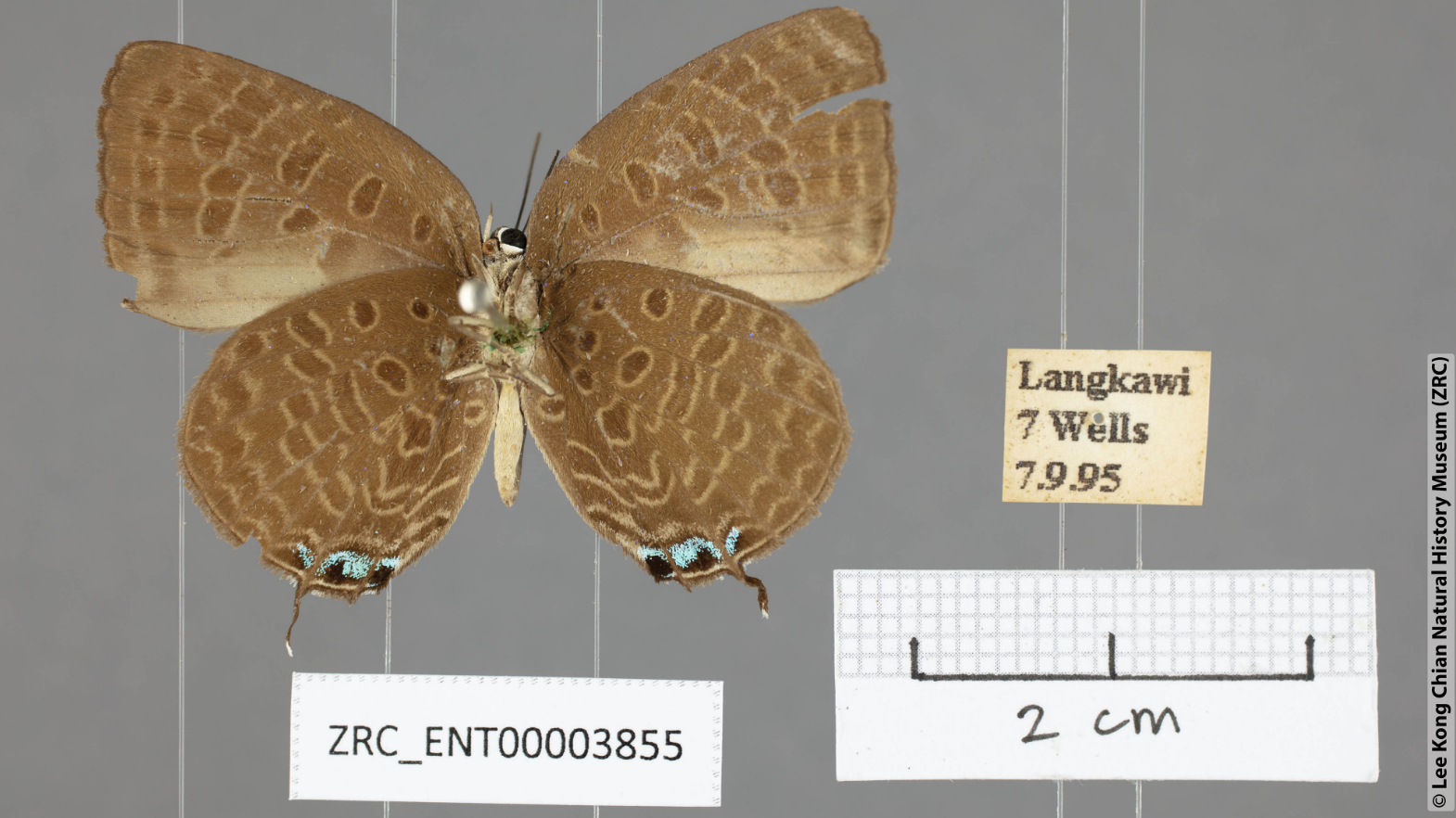
- Underside

Scientific classification
- Kingdom: Animalia
- Phylum: Arthropoda
- Class: Insecta
- Order: Lepidoptera
- Family: Lycaenidae
- Subfamily: Theclinae
- Tribe: Arhopalini
- Genus: Arhopala
- Species: A. arianaga

Binomial name
- Arhopala arianaga Corbet, 1941

Synonyms
- Narathura pseudomuta pseudomuta

= Arhopala arianaga =

Species of butterfly

Arhopala arianaga is a butterfly in the family Lycaenidae. It was discovered by Alexander Steven Corbet in 1941. It is found in West Malaysia. This species is monotypic.

== Description ==
The upperside is bright violet-blue, with a thin black border. The underside is dull brown, customary of most Arhopala butterflies. The wingspan is 18 millimeters.
