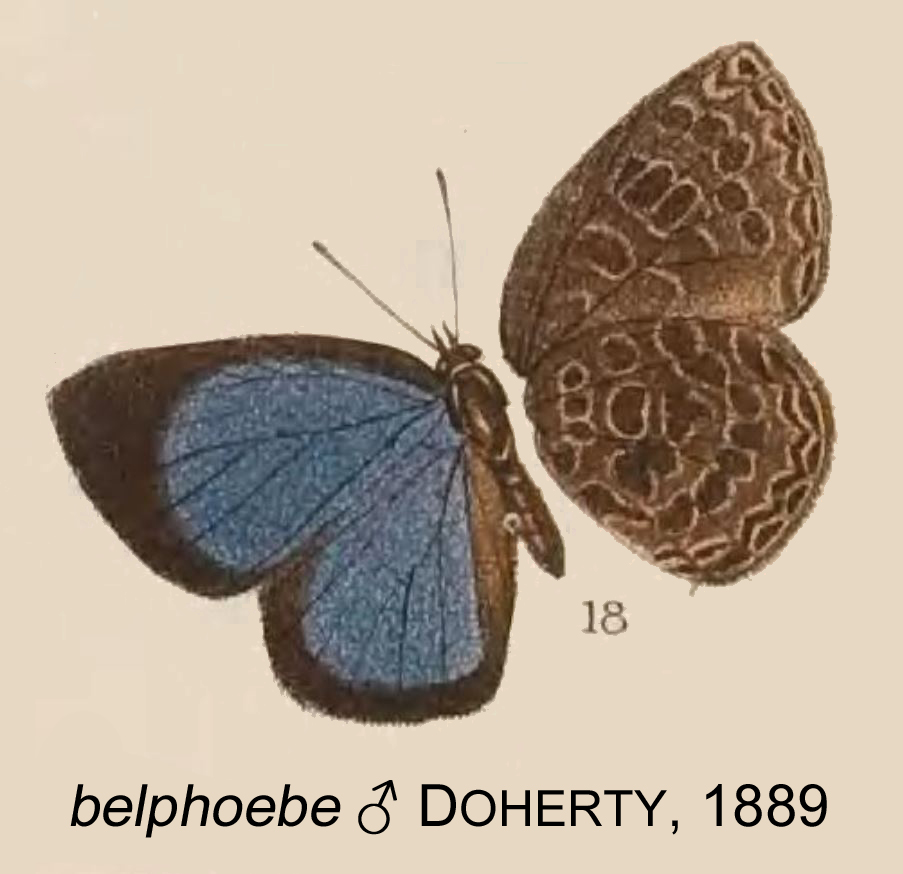
- Arhopala belphoebe from original description.

Scientific classification
- Kingdom: Animalia
- Phylum: Arthropoda
- Clade: Pancrustacea
- Class: Insecta
- Order: Lepidoptera
- Family: Lycaenidae
- Genus: Arhopala
- Species: A. belphoebe

Binomial name
- Arhopala belphoebe (Doherty, 1889)

= Arhopala belphoebe =

Species of butterfly

Arhopala belphoebe is a butterfly in the family Lycaenidae. It was described by William Doherty in 1889. It is found in the Indomalayan realm (Assam and Peninsular Malaya). The subspecies A. b. cowani Corbet, 1941 is described from Malaya.

It was described from a bad specimen; the whole proximal portion of the hindwing, as well as the forewing are violetish blue. Under surface pale brown, with a violet gloss, nearly all the markings composed of ring-shaped circles filled with a slightly darker colour. A somewhat doubtful species which is compared with agesias in the original description, though other authors do not find any resemblance.
