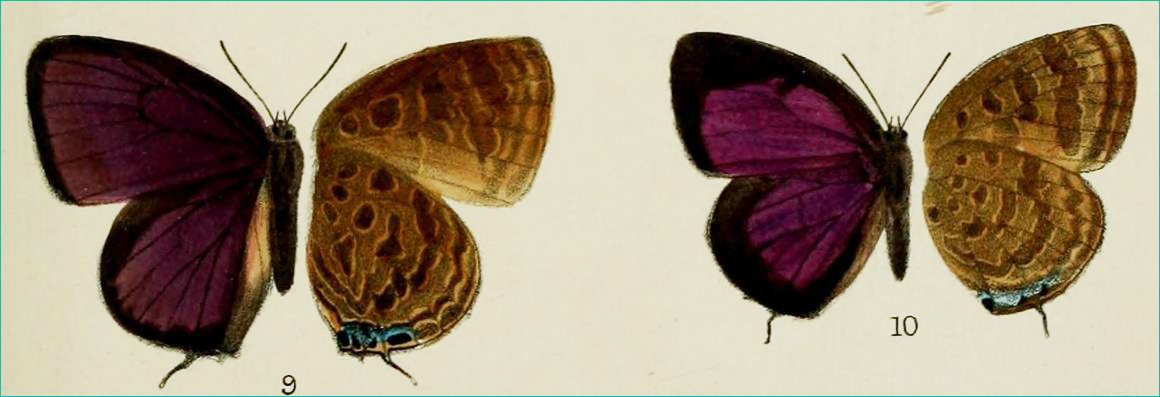
- Arhopala semperi from original description.

Scientific classification
- Kingdom: Animalia
- Phylum: Arthropoda
- Clade: Pancrustacea
- Class: Insecta
- Order: Lepidoptera
- Family: Lycaenidae
- Genus: Arhopala
- Species: A. semperi

Binomial name
- Arhopala semperi (Bethune-Baker, 1896)

= Arhopala semperi =

Species of butterfly

Arhopala semperi is a butterfly in the family Lycaenidae. It was described by George Thomas Bethune-Baker in 1896. It is found in the Indomalayan realm (Borneo) and as A. s. russelli Eliot, 1962 in Peninsular Malaya.

A. semperi differs from tameanga in the black margin of the wings being broader in the male, but narrower in the female, particularly on the hindwing. Beneath the postmedian marginal band of the forewing is somewhat irregular, particularly in the males in some places expanded into clouds. It is uncertain whether the females with regular though darkened bands are correctly ranged here.

The specific name honours Georg Semper.
