= Arhopala myrzalina =

Scientific classification
- Kingdom: Animalia
- Phylum: Arthropoda
- Clade: Pancrustacea
- Class: Insecta
- Order: Lepidoptera
- Family: Lycaenidae
- Subfamily: Theclinae
- Tribe: Arhopalini
- Genus: Arhopala
- Species: A. myrzalina

Binomial name
- Arhopala myrzalina Corbet, 1941

Synonyms
- Narathura myrzalina

Species of butterfly

Arhopala myrzalina is a butterfly in the family Lycaenidae. It was discovered by Alexander Steven Corbet in 1941. It is found in Peninsular Malaysia.

== Description ==
The female is 15 millimeters, is shining blue and has a 4-millimeter border. It is purple washed below, with the markings white-edged.
