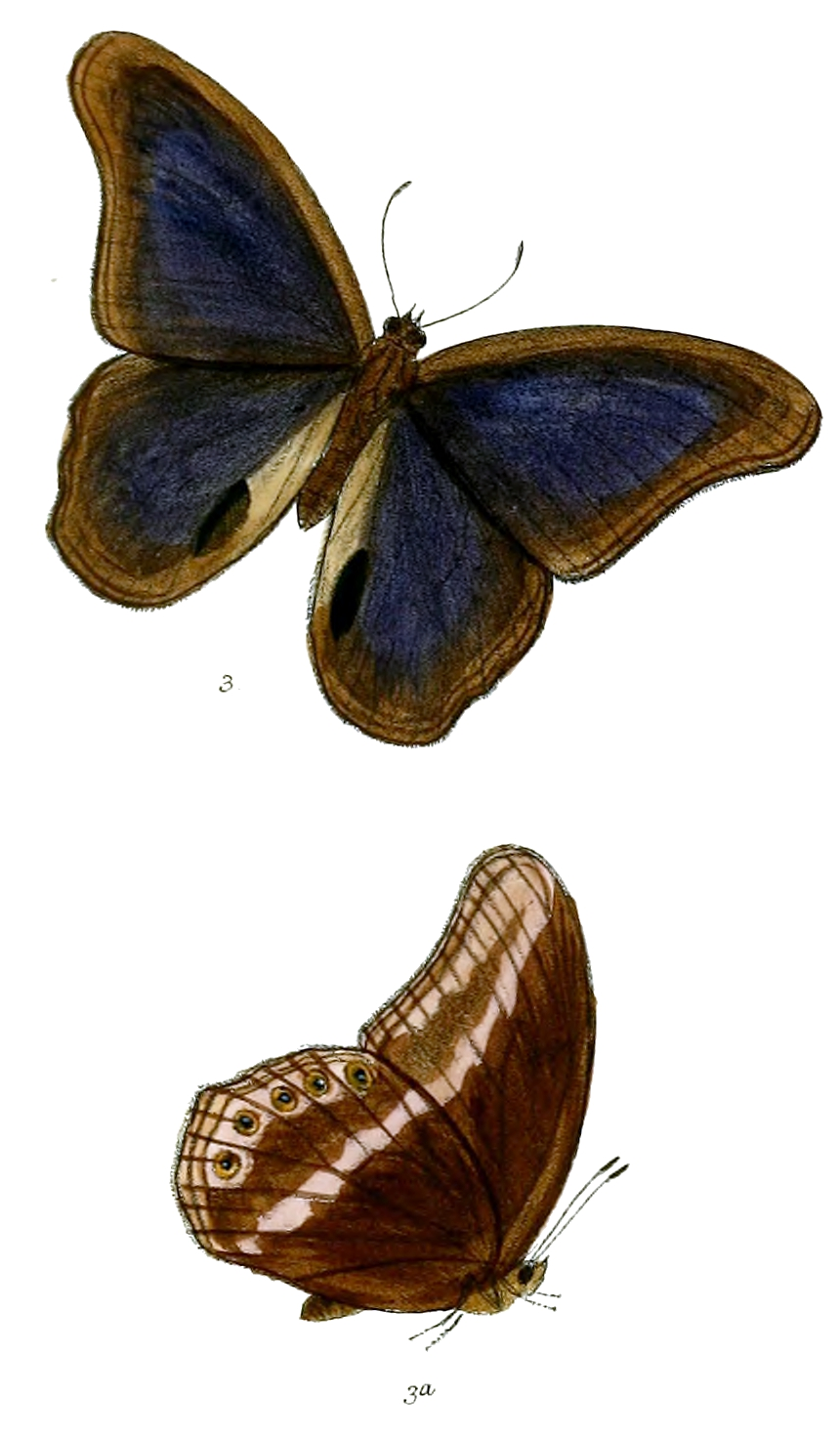
- C. epiminthia binghami

Scientific classification
- Kingdom: Animalia
- Phylum: Arthropoda
- Class: Insecta
- Order: Lepidoptera
- Family: Nymphalidae
- Subfamily: Satyrinae
- Genus: Coelites; Westwood, [1850]

= Coelites =

Genus of butterflies

Coelites is a Southeast Asia genus of butterfly in the family Nymphalidae (Satyrinae)

The genus contains three species:

- Coelites nothis Westwood, [1850]
  - C. n. nothis Assam, Burma, Thailand, Laos
  - C. n. sylvarum Fruhstorfer, 1902 North Vietnam
  - C. n. adamsoni Moore, 1891 Assam, Burma
  - C. n. hainanensis Gu, 1994 Hainan
- Coelites epiminthia Westwood, [1851]
  - C. e. epiminthia Westwood, [1851] Peninsular Malaya, Sumatra, Borneo
  - C. e. binghami Moore, 1891 South Burma
  - C. e. vicinus Felder Sulawesi
- Coelites euptychioides C. & R. Felder, [1867]
  - C. e. euptychioides C. & R. Felder, [1867] Malaya, Sumatra, Borneo
  - C. e. humilis Butler, 1867 Peninsular Malaya, Sumatra
