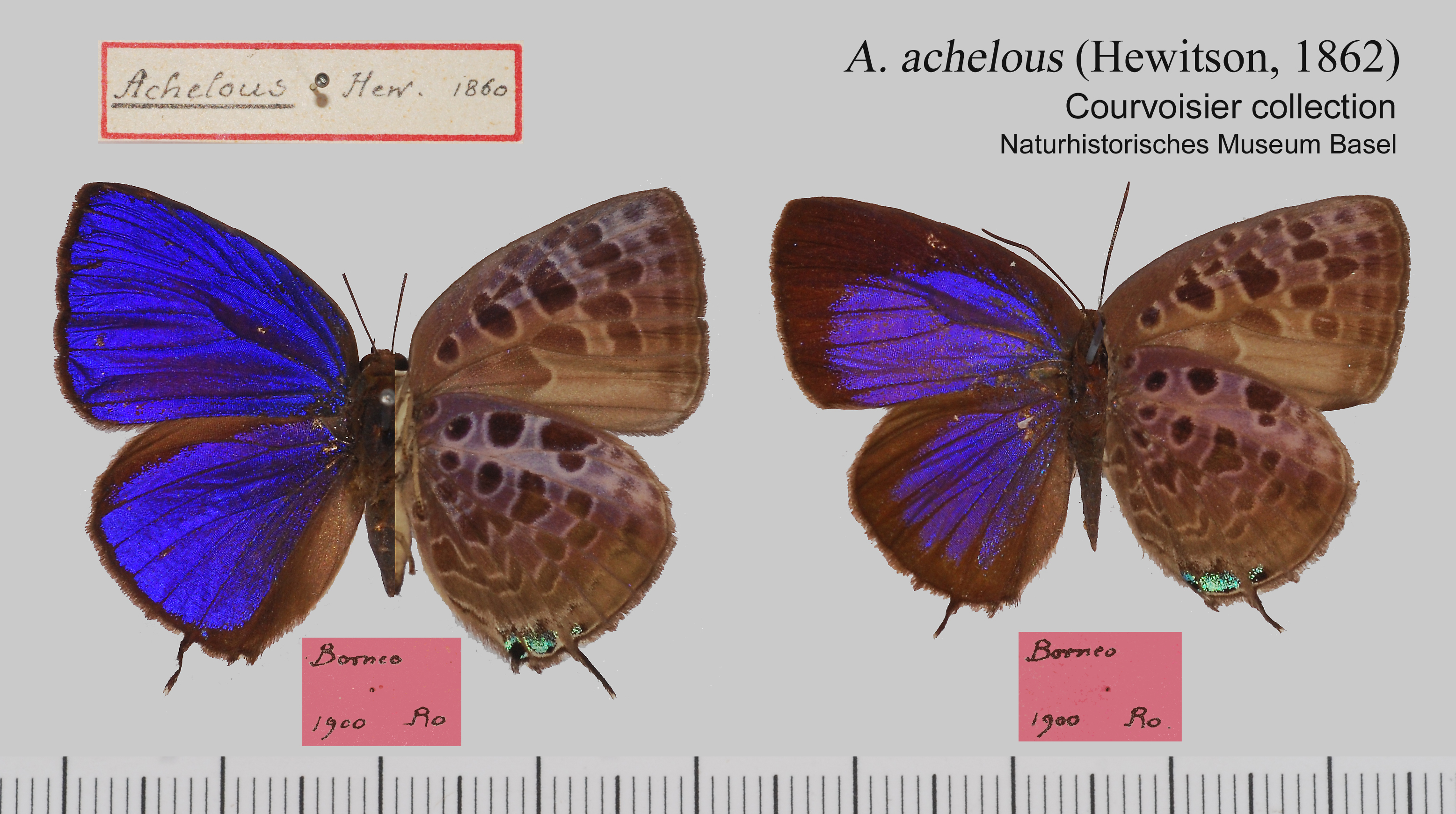

Scientific classification
- Kingdom: Animalia
- Phylum: Arthropoda
- Clade: Pancrustacea
- Class: Insecta
- Order: Lepidoptera
- Family: Lycaenidae
- Genus: Arhopala
- Species: A. achelous

Binomial name
- Arhopala achelous (Hewitson, 1862)

Synonyms
- Amblypodia achelous Hewitson, 1862

= Arhopala achelous =

Species of butterfly

Arhopala achelous is a species of butterfly belonging to the lycaenid family that was described by William Chapman Hewitson in 1862. It is found in Southeast Asia (Peninsular Malaya, Singapore and Borneo).

This species being above of a wonderful sky-blue colour exhibits beneath spots and bands of a uniform dark sepia-brown shade on a red-brown ground.

== Subspecies ==
- Arhopala achelous achelous
- Arhopala achelous malu Corbet, 1946 (Mergui)

== Gallery ==
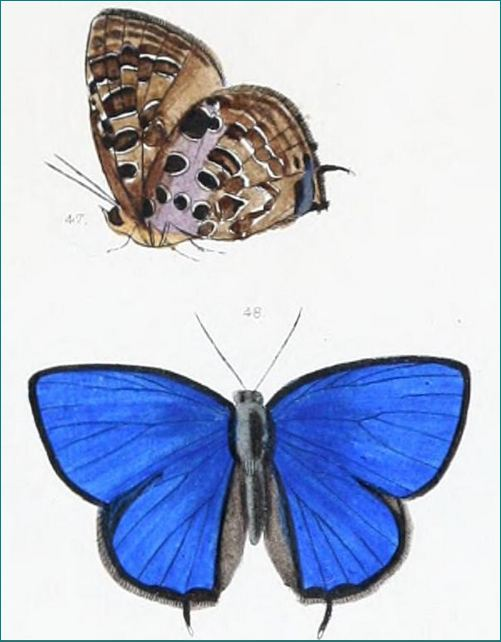

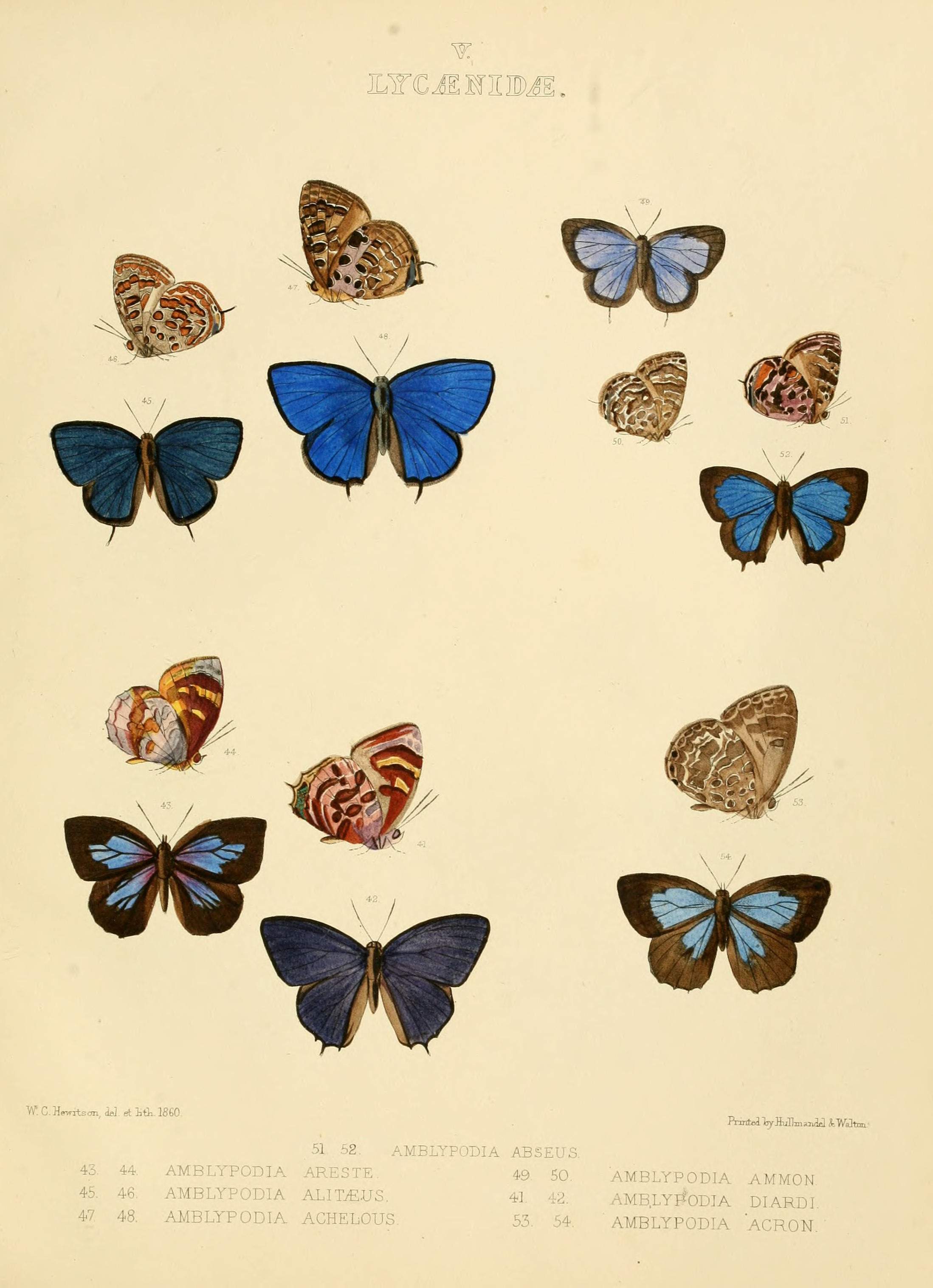

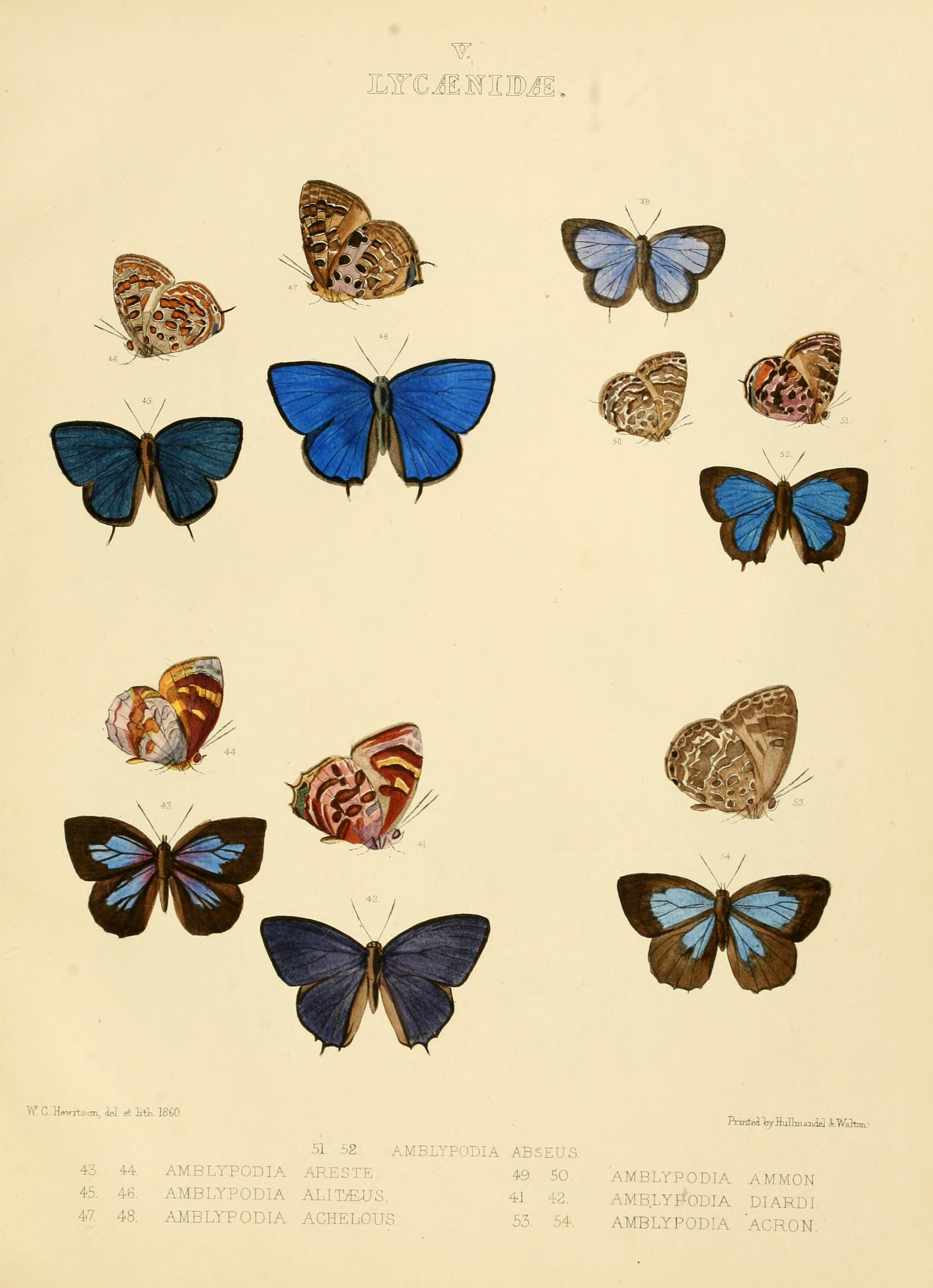

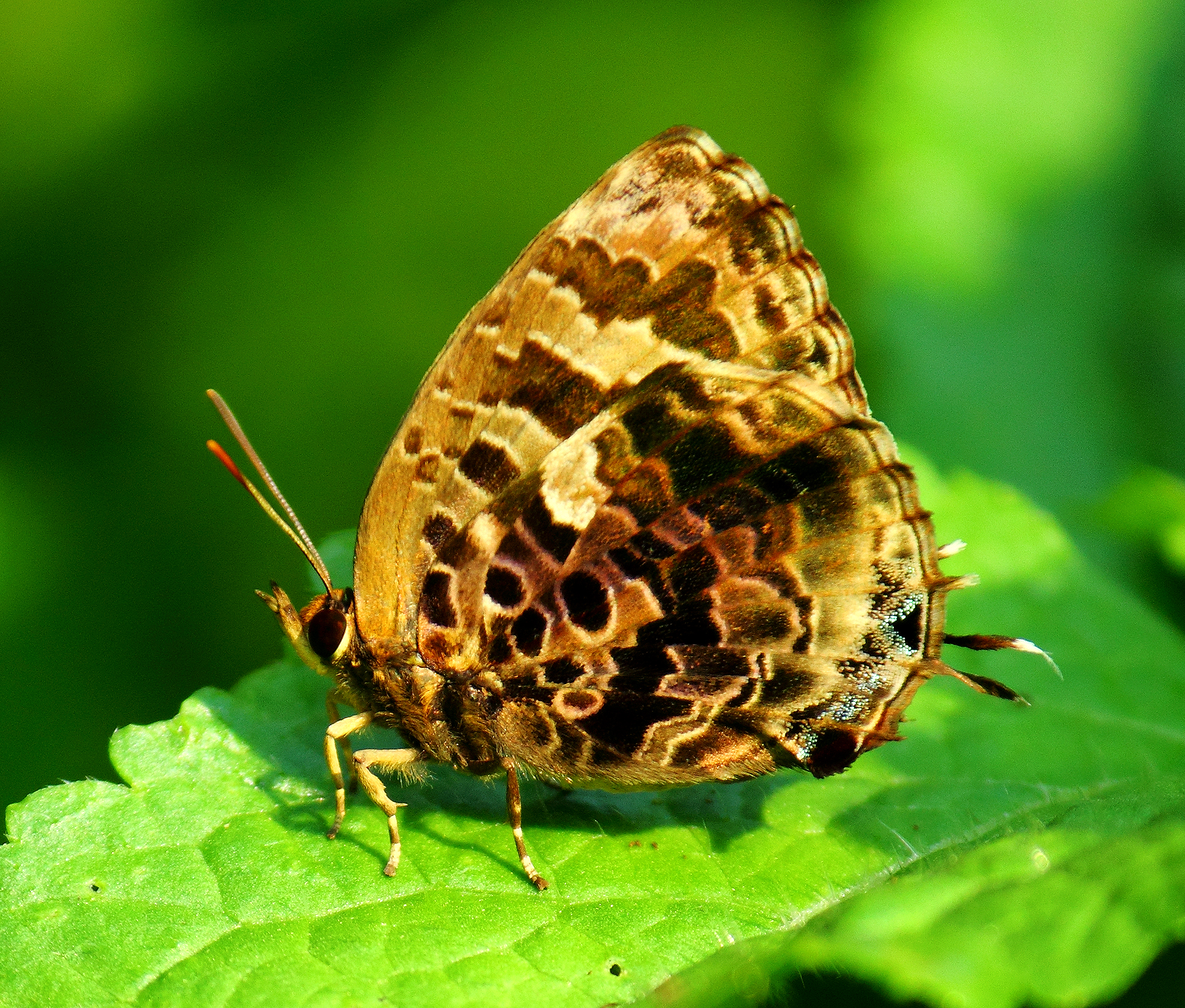
