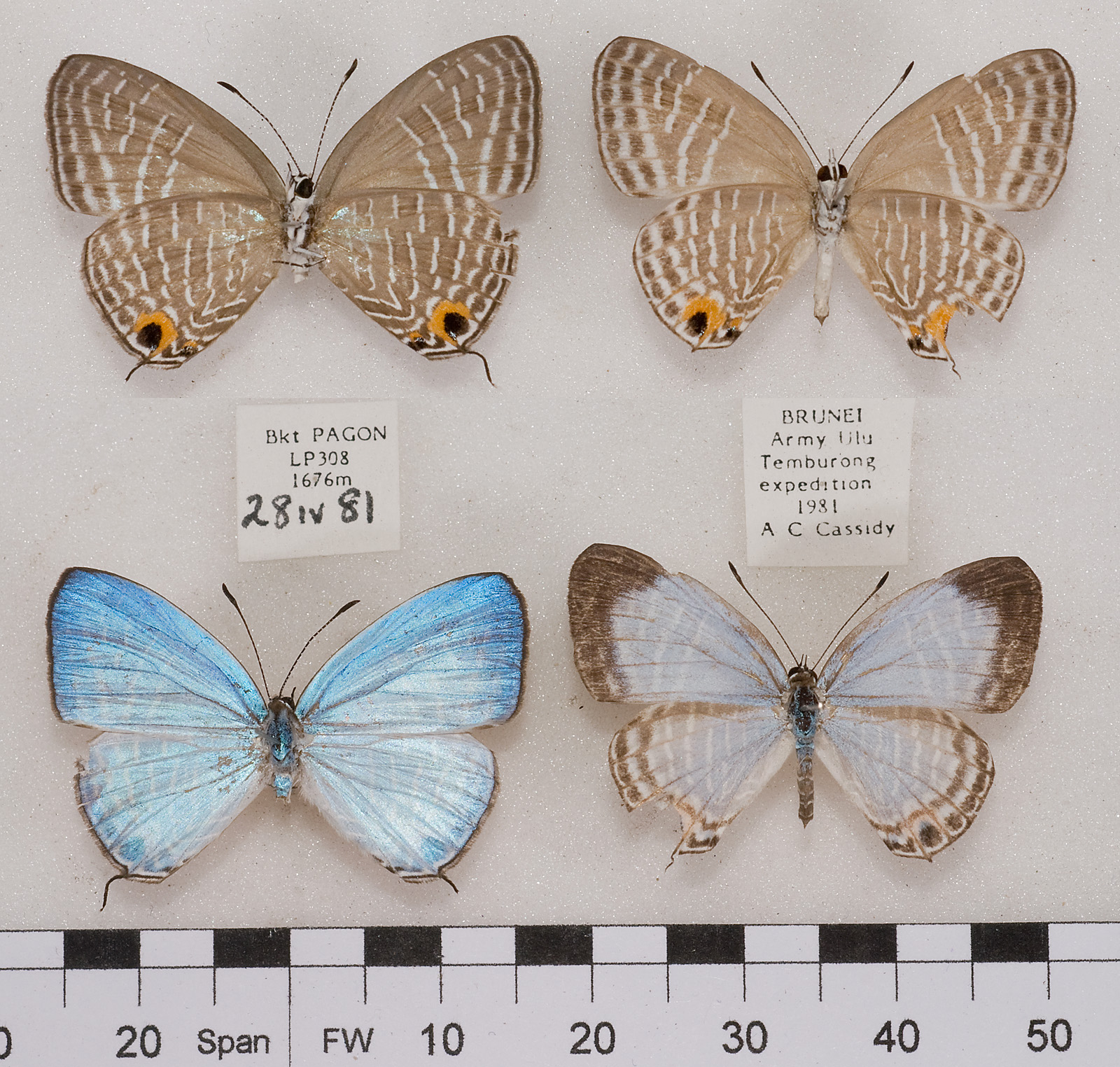

Scientific classification
- Kingdom: Animalia
- Phylum: Arthropoda
- Clade: Pancrustacea
- Class: Insecta
- Order: Lepidoptera
- Family: Lycaenidae
- Genus: Jamides
- Species: J. virgulatus

Binomial name
- Jamides virgulatus (H. H. Druce, 1895)

Synonyms
- Lampides virgulatus H. H. Druce, 1895; Lampides aditja Fruhstorfer, 1915; Jamides cunilda aditja Fruhstorfer; D'Abrera, 1986; Jamides cunilda sekii Takanami, 1988; Jamides cunilda Seki et al, 1991

= Jamides virgulatus =

Species of butterfly

Jamides virgulatus is a butterfly of the lycaenids or blues family. It is found on Borneo and Palawan.

== Original description ==
Upperside much like philatus, Snell., having the dull appearance of that species, but bluer. Underside rather darker grey than in limes, with distinct, narrow, and comparatively straight white bands: the Ist and 2nd are parallel, and have two small spots between them close to the costal margin; the 3rd is very short, and extends from the costal margin to the upper discoidal; the 4th extends to the 2nd median nervule, and has a small spot each side of it close to the costa; the 4th is short and extends from the upper discoidal to the 3rd median nervule. The remaining bands are placed as in elpis. Hind wing as in L. elpis, but the white bands are all straighter. Expanse 1,3; inch.

S.E. Borneo, near Banjarmasin (Wahnes). Type Mus. Staud.

Although this species is much like philatus on the upperside, it is totally different on the underside. It appears to be distinct, and I hope can be recognized from the description given above.

== Taxonomy ==
Seki et al. (1991), considered Jamides cunilda synonymous with J. virgulatus and this was followed by Eliot (1992). However, Hirowatari (1986) and (1992) retains J. cunilda for the taxa from Burma to Java and uses J. virgulatus in a strict sense for taxa from Borneo and Palawan.
