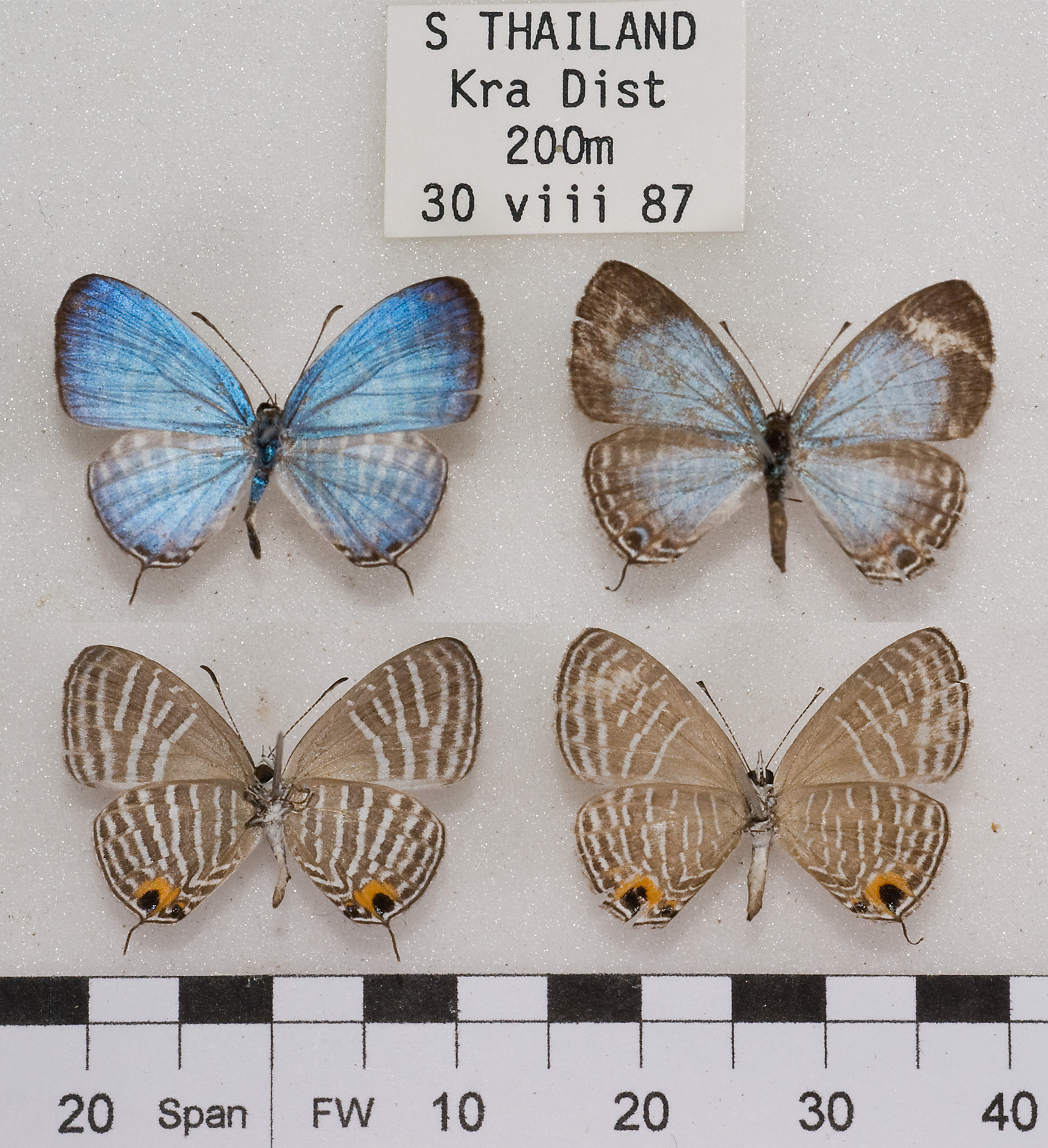

Scientific classification
- Domain: Eukaryota
- Kingdom: Animalia
- Phylum: Arthropoda
- Class: Insecta
- Order: Lepidoptera
- Family: Lycaenidae
- Genus: Jamides
- Species: J. malaccanus

Binomial name
- Jamides malaccanus Röber, 1886

Synonyms
- Plebeius malaccanus

= Jamides malaccanus =

Species of butterfly

Jamides malaccanus is a butterfly of the lycaenids or blues family. It is found on Peninsular Malaysia, Langkawi, Pulau Tioman, Pulau Aur, Singapore, Sumatra, Java and probably in southern Thailand.

== Subspecies ==
- J. m. malaccanus – (Peninsular Malaysia, Langkawi, probably southern Thailand)
- J. m. aurensis – (Pulau Tioman, Pulau Aur)
- J. m. celinus – (Sumatra)
- J. m. saturatus – (Java)
