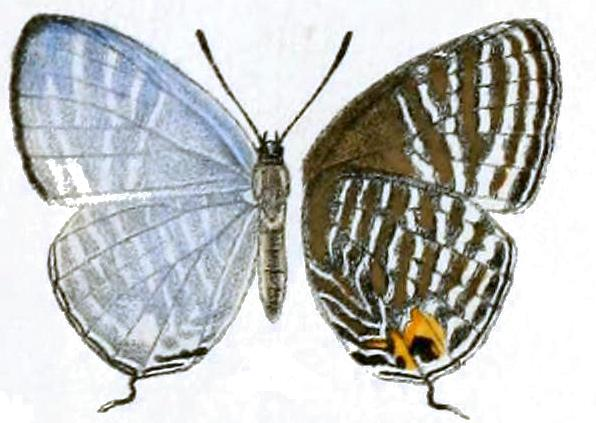

Scientific classification
- Domain: Eukaryota
- Kingdom: Animalia
- Phylum: Arthropoda
- Class: Insecta
- Order: Lepidoptera
- Family: Lycaenidae
- Genus: Jamides
- Species: J. zebra

Binomial name
- Jamides zebra (H. H. Druce, 1895)

Synonyms
- Lampides zebra H. H. Druce, 1895; Jamides zebra magana [sic] Corbet; Bridges, 1988; Lampides vaneeckei Fruhstorfer, 1915

= Jamides zebra =

Species of butterfly

Jamides zebra is a butterfly of the lycaenids or blues family first described by Hamilton Herbert Druce in 1895. It is found in South-east Asia.

== Subspecies ==
- J. z. zebra – (Borneo)
- J. z. lakatti Corbet, 1940 – (Peninsular Malaya)
- J. z. megana Corbet, 1940 – (Mentawi Islands)
- J. z. vaneeckei (Fruhstorfer, 1915) – (Nias)
