= Jamides kankena =

Glistening cerulean

Scientific classification
- Kingdom: Animalia
- Phylum: Arthropoda
- Class: Insecta
- Order: Lepidoptera
- Family: Lycaenidae
- Genus: Jamides
- Species: J. kankena

Binomial name
- Jamides kankena (C. Felder, 1862)

Synonyms
- Lycaena kankena Felder, 1862; Lampides kankena (Felder, 1862)

Species of butterfly

Jamides kankena, the glistening cerulean, is a small butterfly found in India that belongs to the lycaenids or blues family.

== Description ==
Wet-season brood. Male upperside: azure blue deepening in tint towards the apex of the forewing. Forewing: a narrow black terminal edging widened towards the apex; cilia brownish black. Hindwing: costal margin broadly, dorsal margin more narrowly paler than the ground colour; a subterminal series of black spots edged outwardly with white, the spot in interspace 2 the largest, oval or round, the others smaller, transversely sublinear; a clearly defined anteciliary black line; cilia brown with a white line along their bases, often restricted to the posterior half of the wing. Underside: greyish brown. Forewings and hindwings: two subterminal and a terminal white transverse line succeeded by an anteciliary black line on each wing, the ground colour enclosed between these lines of a slightly darker shade with the appearance of somewhat maculate (spotted) transverse bands. On the hindwing near apices of interspaces 1 a, 1 and 2 enclosed between the inner of the two subterminal white lines and the terminal white line are a large round black spot inwardly edged with ochraceous in interspace 2, two minute black geminate (paired) spots in interspace 1 and a similar single spot in interspace 1 a, the latter three spots superposed on a white ground and above the white a narrow transverse short ochraceous line. Forewing: in addition four obliquely placed, transverse, white parallel fasti as follows: two, one on either side of the discocellulars extended between the subcostal vein and the dorsum; two upper discal lines broken and sinuate, extended from just below the costa, the inner lino to vein 3, the outer line to vein 1. Hindwing: crossed by five transverse parallel white fasciae besides the terminal markings already mentioned, these are all more or less interrupted and broken anteriorly and the inner four abruptly curved upwards posteriorly. Antennas, head, thorax and abdomen dark brown, the shafts of the antennas ringed with white, the thorax and abdomen at base with a little blue pubescence; beneath: palpi, thorax and abdomen white.

Female upperside: pale blue with a slight purple tinge. Forewing: costa increasingly to the apex, termen decreasingly to the tornus heavily edged with black; at the apex of the wing the black occupies about one-fourth of the wing. Hindwing: markings as in the male but the subterminal line of black spots much more clearly defined; the spots larger, edged prominently on both inner and outer sides with white, which on the inner side is margined by a lunular heavy transverse black line. Underside: precisely as in the male. Antennae, head, thorax and abdomen similar to those of the male.

Dry-season brood. Similar to the males and females of the wet-season brood but differ as follows: male upperside: pale purplish blue fading on the discs of the wings in some specimens to white; terminal black edging to the forewing narrower; markings on the hindwing fainter, trending towards obsolescence. Underside: from very pale ochraceous white to dark earthy ochraceous; markings identical with those in specimens of the wet-season brood, but in some of the very pale specimens the white fasciae assume a pale greenish-blue metallic tint. Antennae, head, thorax and abdomen as in the wet-season specimens but paler. Female differs from the wet-season specimens only in the paler ground colour both on the upper and undersides, on the former also by the narrowness of the black edging to the forewing, and the subobsolescence of the markings on the hindwing.

== Distribution ==
It is native to the Andamans and Nicobar islands.

== Larva ==
"Feeds on the flowers and seeds of the cultivated cardamom and also on those of Kaempferia pandurata. It is very similar to that of L. celeno, Cramer, but is of a pink hue, with well-defined stripes of red dorsally and laterally." (Davidson, Bell & Aitken)

== Pupa ==
"... found inside the fruit, or in the cluster of dead flowers above the fruit; is smooth and of a dull yellowish brown, marked with interrupted bands of a darker brown. In shape it is similar to (that of) L. celeno." (Davidson, Bell & Aitken.)

== See also ==
- List of butterflies of India
- List of butterflies of India (Lycaenidae)
