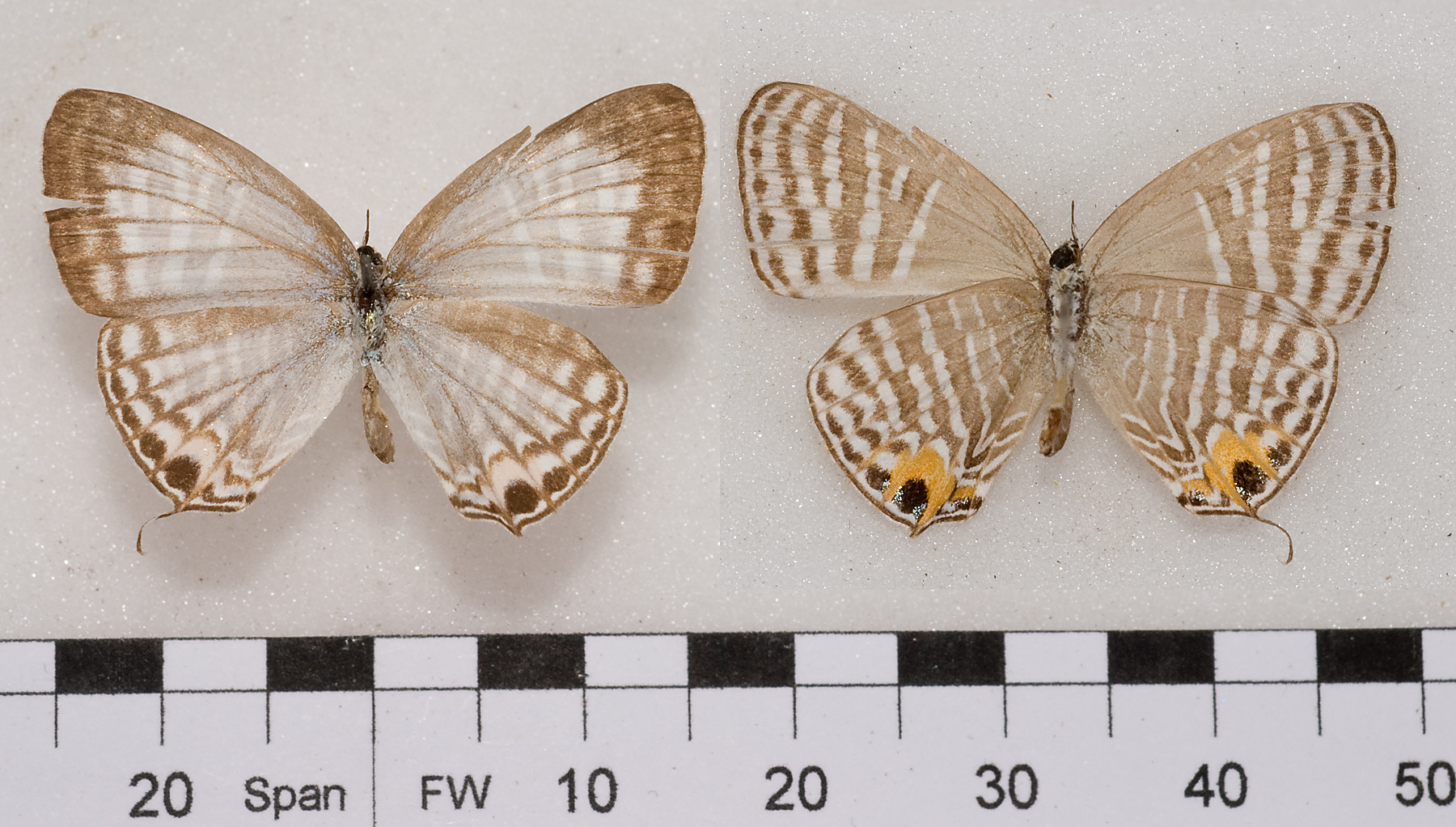

Scientific classification
- Domain: Eukaryota
- Kingdom: Animalia
- Phylum: Arthropoda
- Class: Insecta
- Order: Lepidoptera
- Family: Lycaenidae
- Genus: Jamides
- Species: J. cleodus

Binomial name
- Jamides cleodus (C. Felder, 1865)

= Jamides cleodus =

White cerulean

Species of butterfly

Jamides cleodus, the white cerulean, is a small butterfly found in India that belongs to the lycaenids or blues family. The species was first described by Cajetan Felder in 1865.

== See also ==
- List of butterflies of India
- List of butterflies of India (Lycaenidae)
