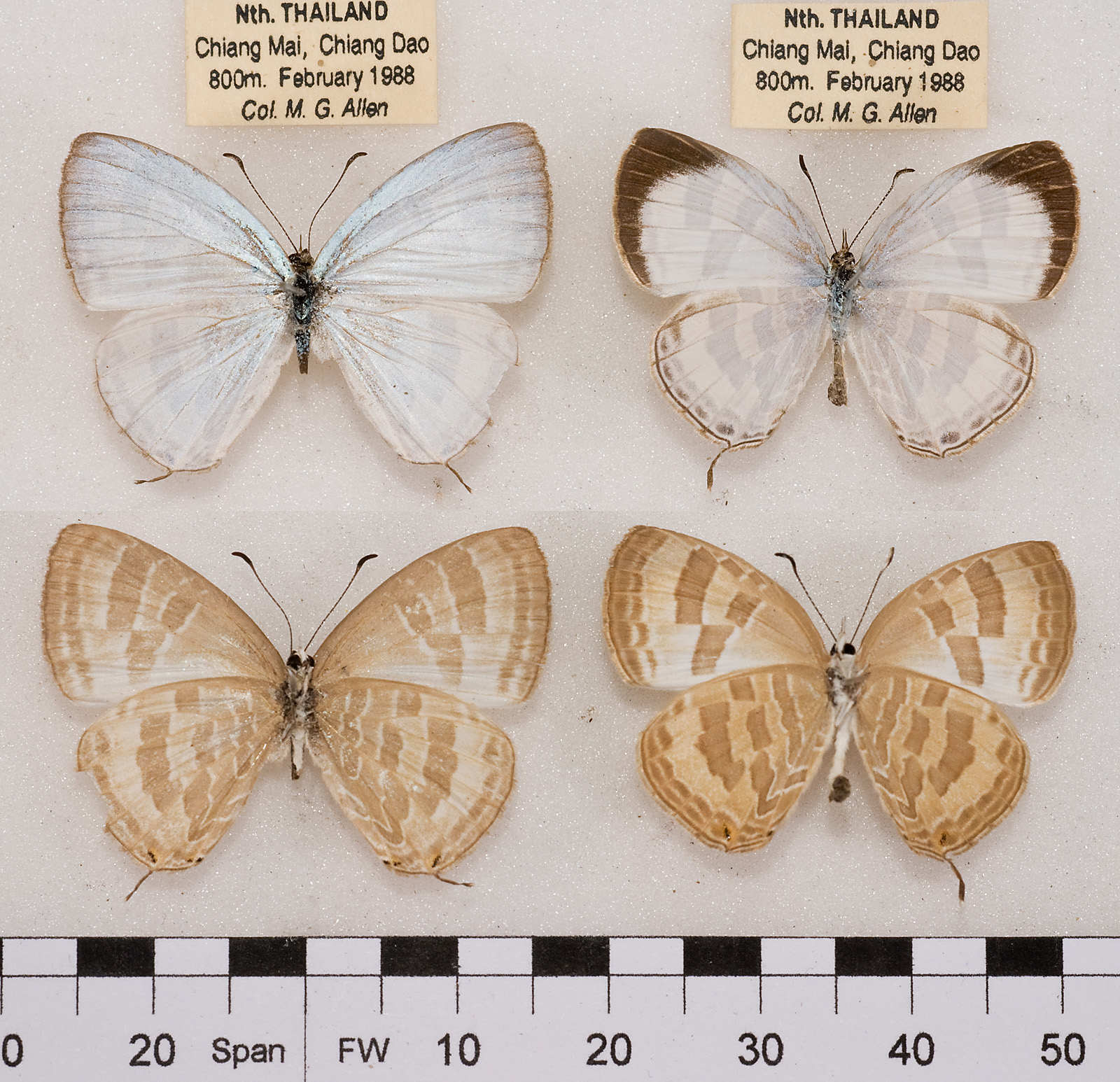

Scientific classification
- Kingdom: Animalia
- Phylum: Arthropoda
- Clade: Pancrustacea
- Class: Insecta
- Order: Lepidoptera
- Family: Lycaenidae
- Genus: Jamides
- Species: J. pura

Binomial name
- Jamides pura (Moore, 1886)

Synonyms
- Lampides pura Moore, 1886; Lampides celeno arama f. zebrina Fruhstorfer, 1916; Lampides celeno ruvana f. parazebra Fruhstorfer, 1916; Lampides suidas spitamenes Fruhstorfer, 1916; Lampides suidas eordaea Fruhstorfer, 1916; Jamides pura howarthi Hayashi, [1977]; Lampides suidas tenus Fruhstorfer, 1916; Lampides celeno juliana van Eecke, 1914

= Jamides pura =

Species of butterfly

Jamides pura, the white cerulean, is a butterfly in the family Lycaenidae. It was described by Frederic Moore in 1886. It is found in the Indomalayan realm.It is similar to Jamides celeno but the under surface is not yellowish- grey with dark bands, but brown, traversed by chains of whitish comma-like spots. Besides the contours of the wings are different, obtuser and more roundish, and the colour of the male above is lightr, more milky

== Subspecies ==
- Jamides pura pura (Sikkim, Assam to Sumatra)
- Jamides pura zebrina (Fruhstorfer, 1916) (Nias)
- Jamides pura parazebra (Fruhstorfer, 1916) (Java)
- Jamides pura spitamenes (Fruhstorfer, 1916) (Obi)
- Jamides pura eordaea (Fruhstorfer, 1916) (Palawan)
- Jamides pura tenus (Fruhstorfer, 1916) (Borneo)
- Jamides pura juliana (van Eecke, 1914) (Simalue)
- Jamides pura babinus Takanami, 1990 (Babi)
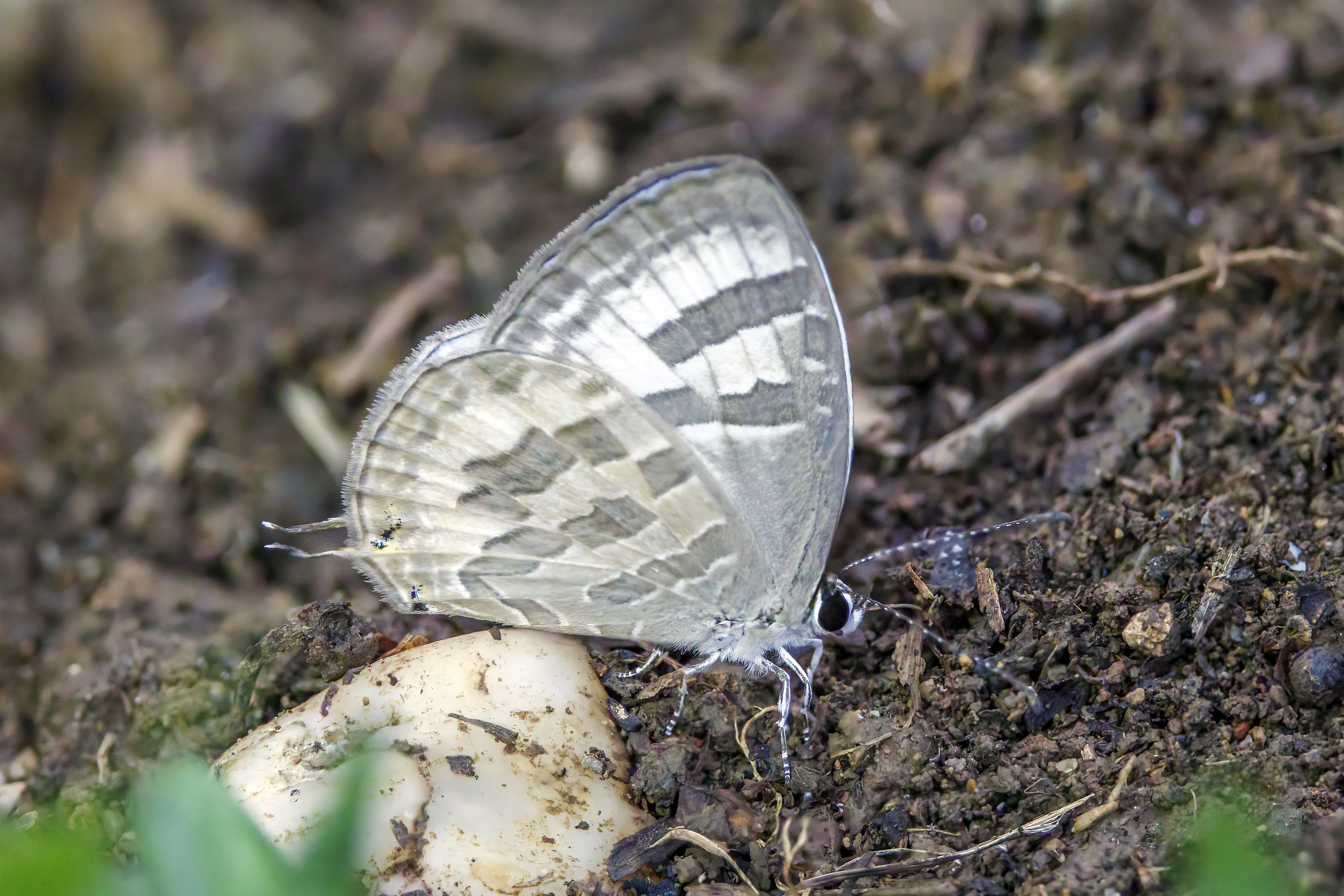

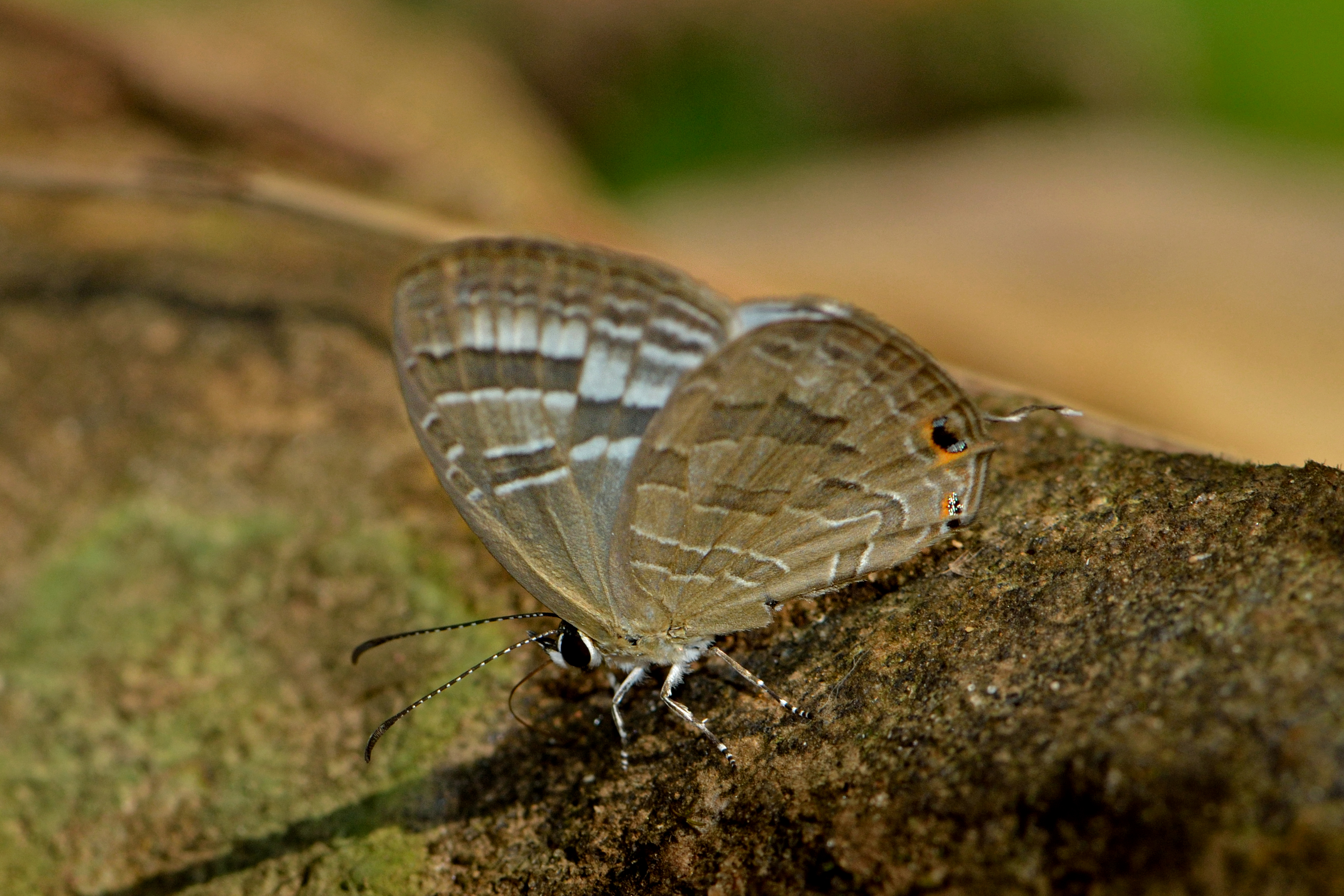
