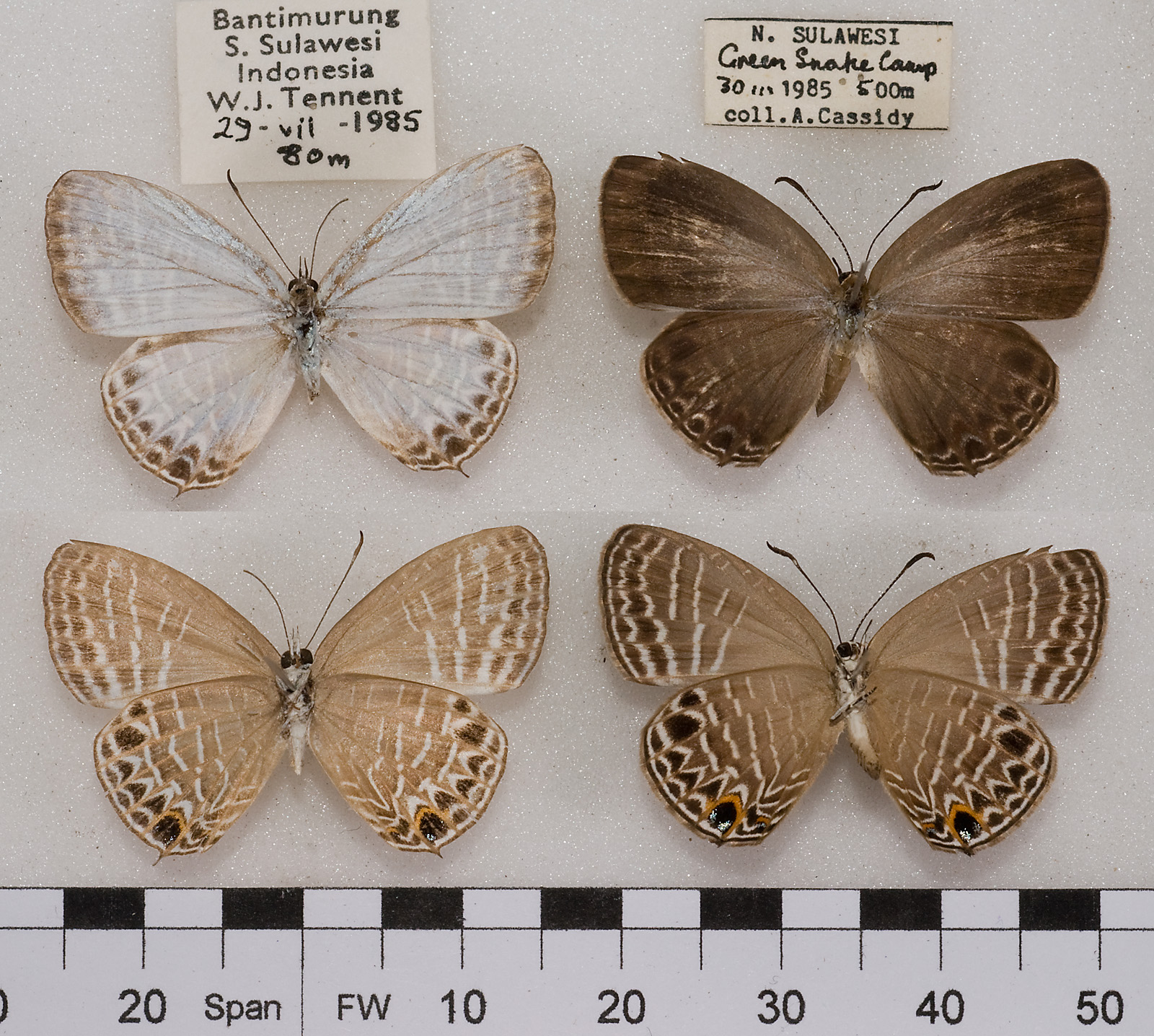

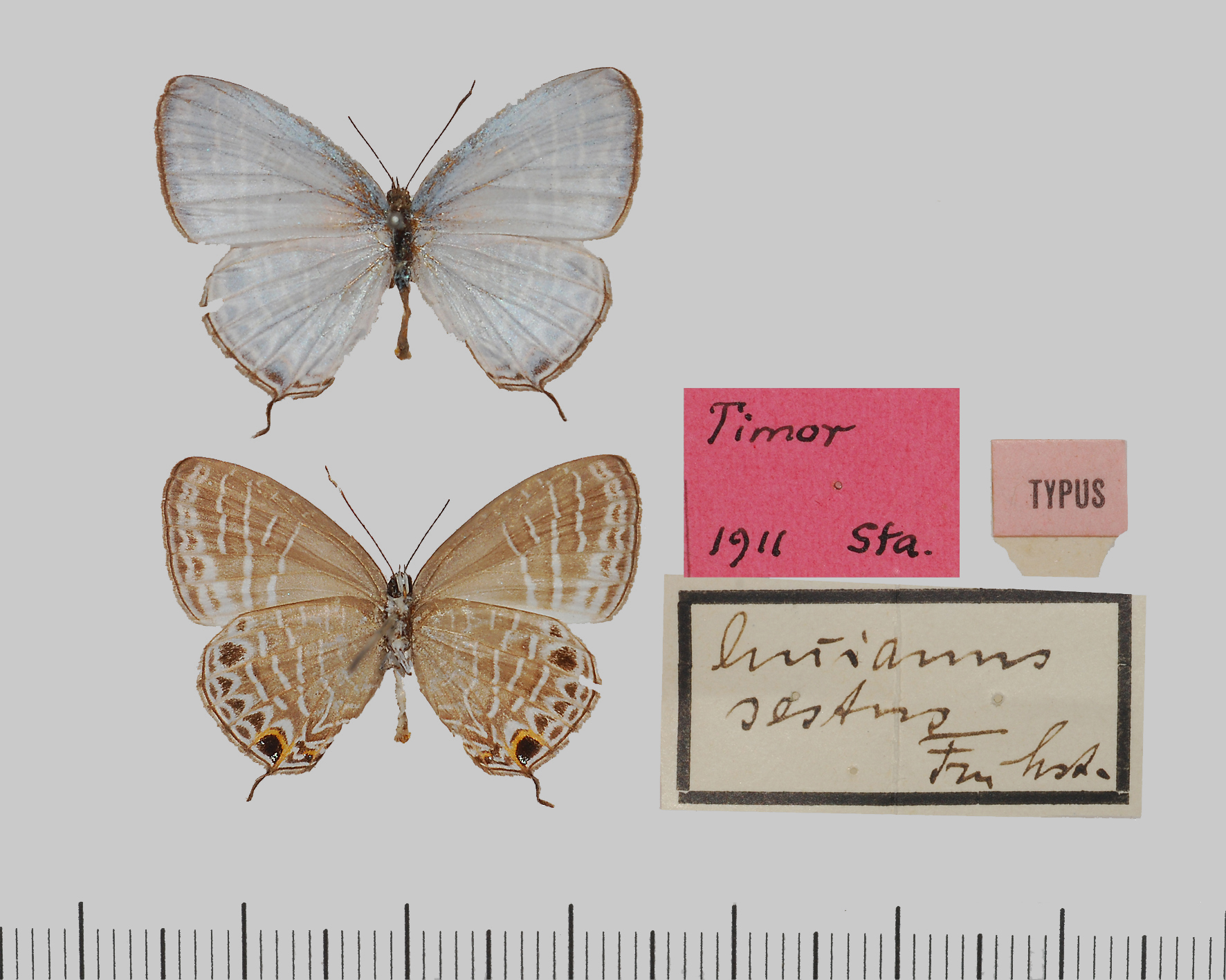
- J. a. lunata from Sulawesi (above) and J. a. sestus from Timor (below), from the Courvoisier Collection in Basel

Scientific classification
- Domain: Eukaryota
- Kingdom: Animalia
- Phylum: Arthropoda
- Class: Insecta
- Order: Lepidoptera
- Family: Lycaenidae
- Genus: Jamides
- Species: J. aratus

Binomial name
- Jamides aratus Stoll, 1781

Synonyms
- Papilio aratus; Lampides masu

= Jamides aratus =

Species of butterfly

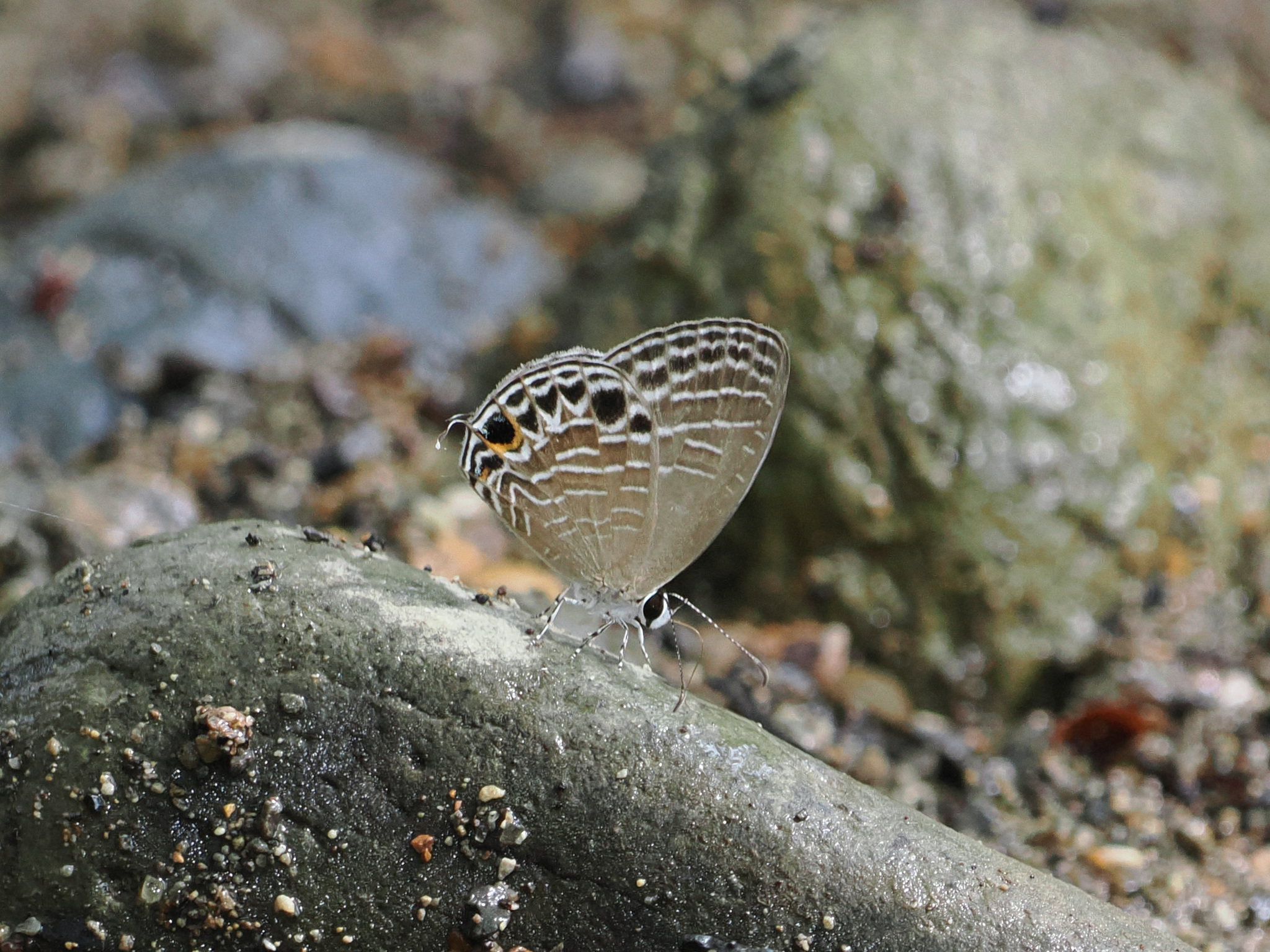
Resting

Jamides aratus is a butterfly of the lycaenids or blues family. It is found on Peninsular Malaysia, most of Indonesia and some surrounding islands.

== Subspecies ==
- J. a. aratus (Ambon, Serang, Sapania)
- J. a. adana (Druce, 1873) (Peninsular Malaysia, Borneo, Sumatra)
- J. a. pseudaratus (Fruhstorfer, 1916) (Obi)
- J. a. ezeon (Fruhstorfer, 1916) (Banda Island)
- J. a. vuniva Fruhstorfer, 1916 (Halmahera)
- J. a. batjanensis (Röber, 1886) (Bachan)
- J. a. caerulina (Mathew, 1887) (New Britain, Duke of York, possibly Solomons)
- J. a. aetherialis Fruhstorfer, 1916 (Kai Island) May be full species Jamides aetherialis (Butler, 1884)
- J. a. sestus (Fruhstorfer, 1916) (Timor)
- J. a. avrus recte ayrus (Fruhstorfer, 1916) (West Irian) May be subspecies of Jamides aetherialis (Butler, 1884)
- J. a. duvana (Fruhstorfer, 1916) (Karkar Island) May be subspecies of Jamides aetherialis (Butler, 1884)
- J. a. lunata (de Nicéville, 1898) (Sulawesi)
- J. a. tryphiodorus (Fruhstorfer, 1916) (Java)
- J. a. nausiphanes (Fruhstorfer, 1916) (Palawan)
- J. a. minthe (Fruhstorfer, 1916) (Sula)
- J. a. djampeana (Snellen, 1890) (Tanahjampea)
- J. a. makitai Takanami, 1987 Talaud
- J. a. vignei Rawlins, Cassidy, Müller, Schröder & Tennent, 2014 (North Maluku, Morotai)
- J. a. roberti Rawlins, Cassidy, Müller, Schröder & Tennent, 2014 (Maluku, Gebe)
- J. a. samueli Rawlins, Cassidy, Müller, Schröder & Tennent, 2014 (Maluku, Damar)
