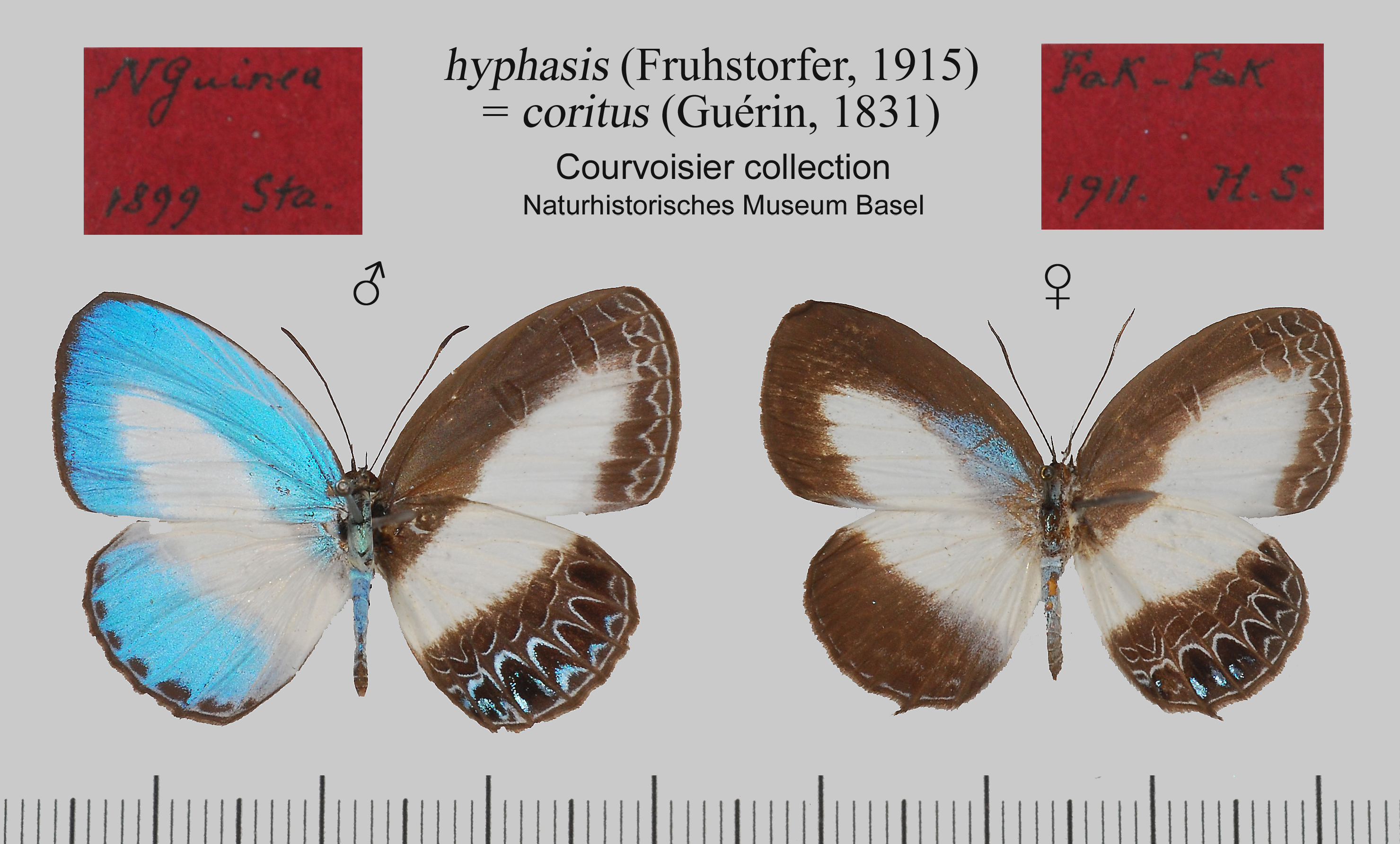

Scientific classification
- Kingdom: Animalia
- Phylum: Arthropoda
- Clade: Pancrustacea
- Class: Insecta
- Order: Lepidoptera
- Family: Lycaenidae
- Genus: Jamides
- Species: J. coritus

Binomial name
- Jamides coritus (Guérin-Méneville), [1831].

Synonyms
- Damis coritus Guérin-Méneville, [1831]; Lampides euchylas hyphasis Fruhstorfer, 1915; Cupido (Lampides) pseudeuchylas Strand, 1911; Lampides euchylas phasis Fruhstorfer, [1916]

= Jamides coritus =

Species of butterfly

Jamides coritus is a butterfly in the family Lycaenidae. It was described by Félix Édouard Guérin-Méneville in 1831. It is found in New Guinea.

== Subspecies ==
- Jamides coritus coritus (Misool, Salawati, Mioswar, Dore Bay, Arfak Mountains., Wandesi, Kapuar, Fak Fak, Triton Bay)
- Jamides coritus pseudeuchylas (Strand, 1911) (Geelvink Bay (islands), Wangaar R., Etna Bay, Humboldt Bay, Mt. Bougainville, New Guinea (Aitape), Aroa, Vailala R)
- Jamides coritus setekwaensis Tite, 1960 (West Irian: Setekwa, Oetakwa, Eilanden Rivers)
