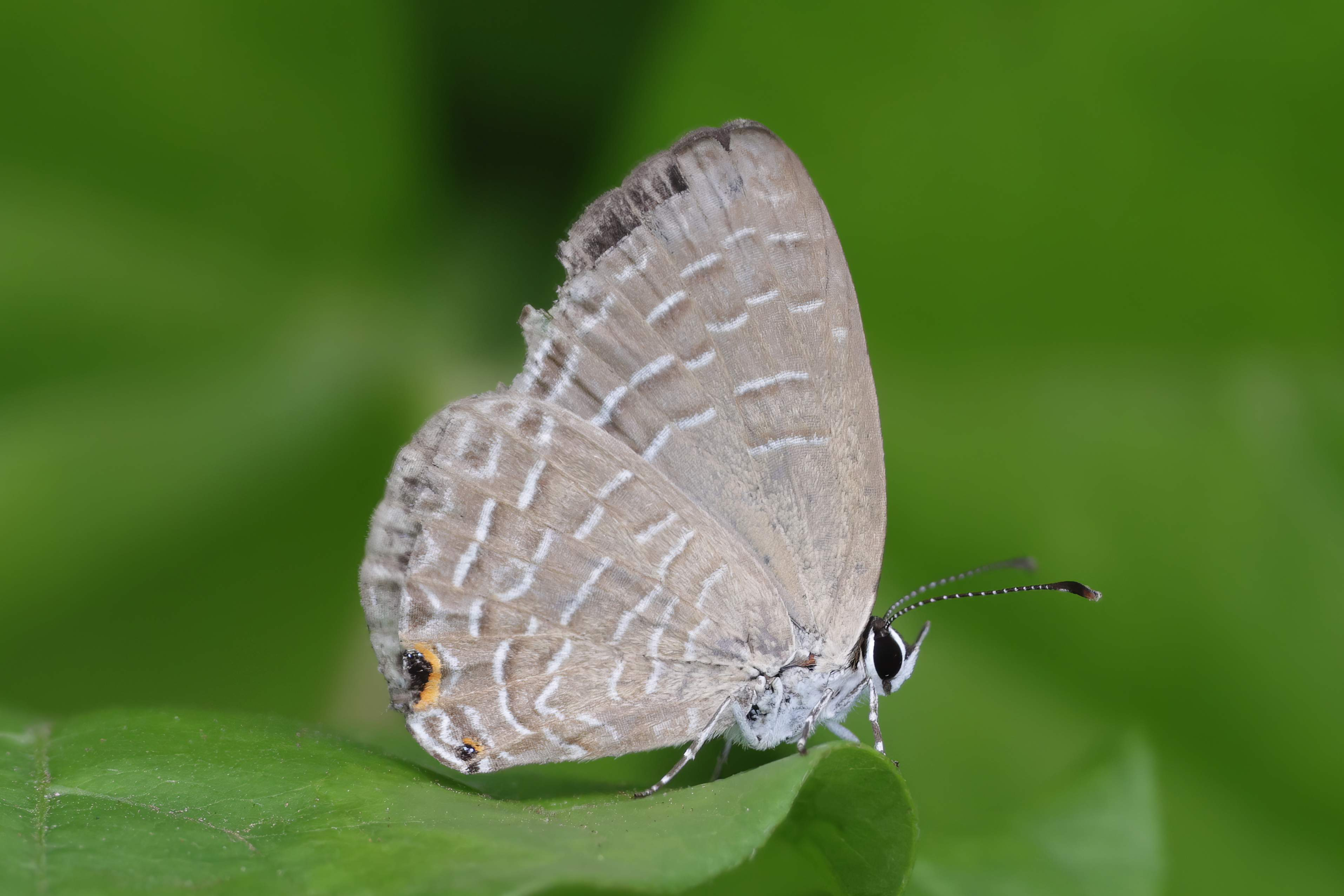
- on Taveuni

Scientific classification
- Kingdom: Animalia
- Phylum: Arthropoda
- Class: Insecta
- Order: Lepidoptera
- Family: Lycaenidae
- Genus: Jamides
- Species: J. candrena

Binomial name
- Jamides candrena (Herrich-Schäffer, 1869)

Synonyms
- Lycaena candrena Herrich-Schäffer, 1869; Jamides candrenus; Jamides campanulata Butler, 1884; Jamides lobelia Butler, 1884; Jamides woodfordi Butler, 1884; Jamides petunia H. H. Druce, 1887

= Jamides candrena =

Species of butterfly

Jamides candrena is a butterfly of the family Lycaenidae. It was described by Gottlieb August Wilhelm Herrich-Schäffer in 1869. It is found on Fiji.
