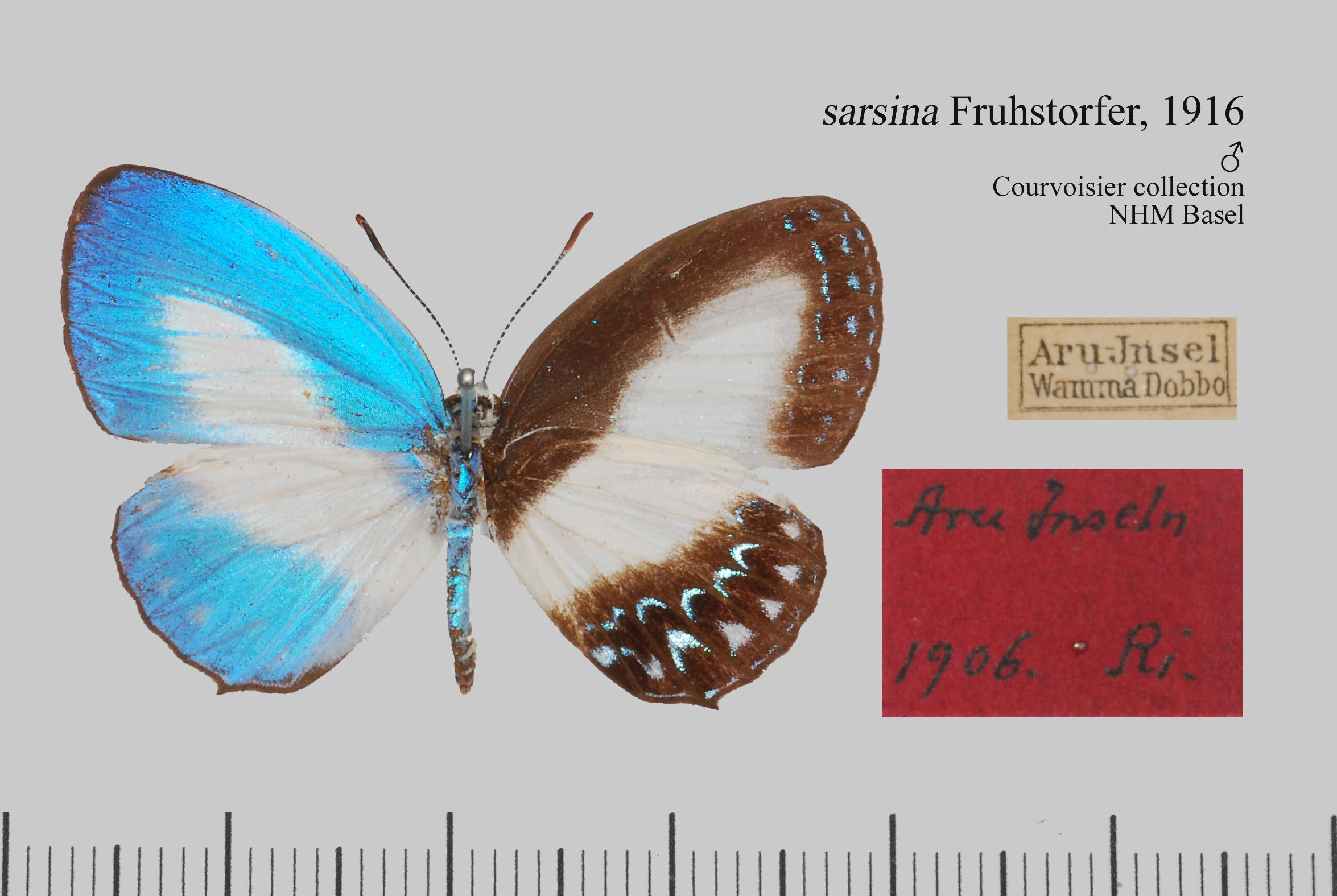
- Jamides aleuas sarsina From the Courvoisier Collection, Basel, Switzerland

Scientific classification
- Domain: Eukaryota
- Kingdom: Animalia
- Phylum: Arthropoda
- Class: Insecta
- Order: Lepidoptera
- Family: Lycaenidae
- Genus: Jamides
- Species: J. aleuas

Binomial name
- Jamides aleuas (C. & R. Felder, [1865])

Synonyms
- Lycaena aleuas C. & R. Felder, [1865]; Lycaena alcas C. & R. Felder, [1865]; Danis coelestis Miskin, 1891; Lampides aleuas sarsina Fruhstorfer, 1916; Lampides aleuas pholes Fruhstorfer, 1916

= Jamides aleuas =

Species of butterfly

Jamides aleuas is a butterfly in the family Lycaenidae. It was described by Cajetan Felder and Rudolf Felder in 1865. It is found in the Australasian realm.

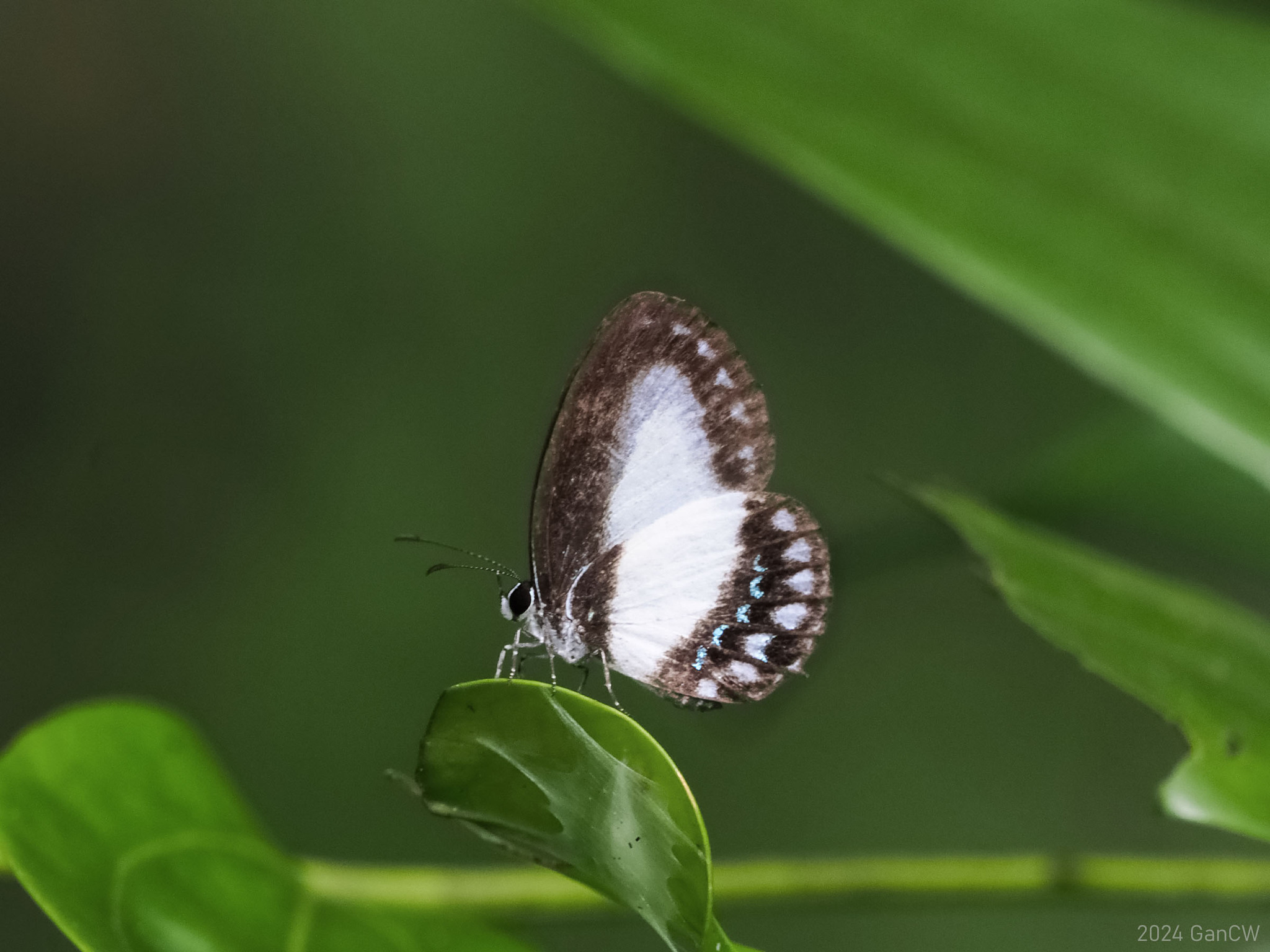
Resting

The larvae feed on Arytera pauciflora and Sarcopteryx stipitata.

== Subspecies ==
- J. a. aleuas (Misool)
- J. a. alcas (C. & R. Felder, [1865]) (Waigeu)
- J. a. coelestis (Miskin, 1891) (Queensland)
- J. a. sarsina (Fruhstorfer, 1916) (Aru)
- J. a. pholes (Fruhstorfer, 1916) (Manokwari, Biak, Dore Bay, Weyaland Mountains, Afrak Mountains, Oetakwa River, West Irian: Fak Fak)
- J. a. nitidus Tite, 1960 (eastern New Guinea to south-eastern Papua)
- J. a. jobiensis Tite, 1960 (Jobi)
