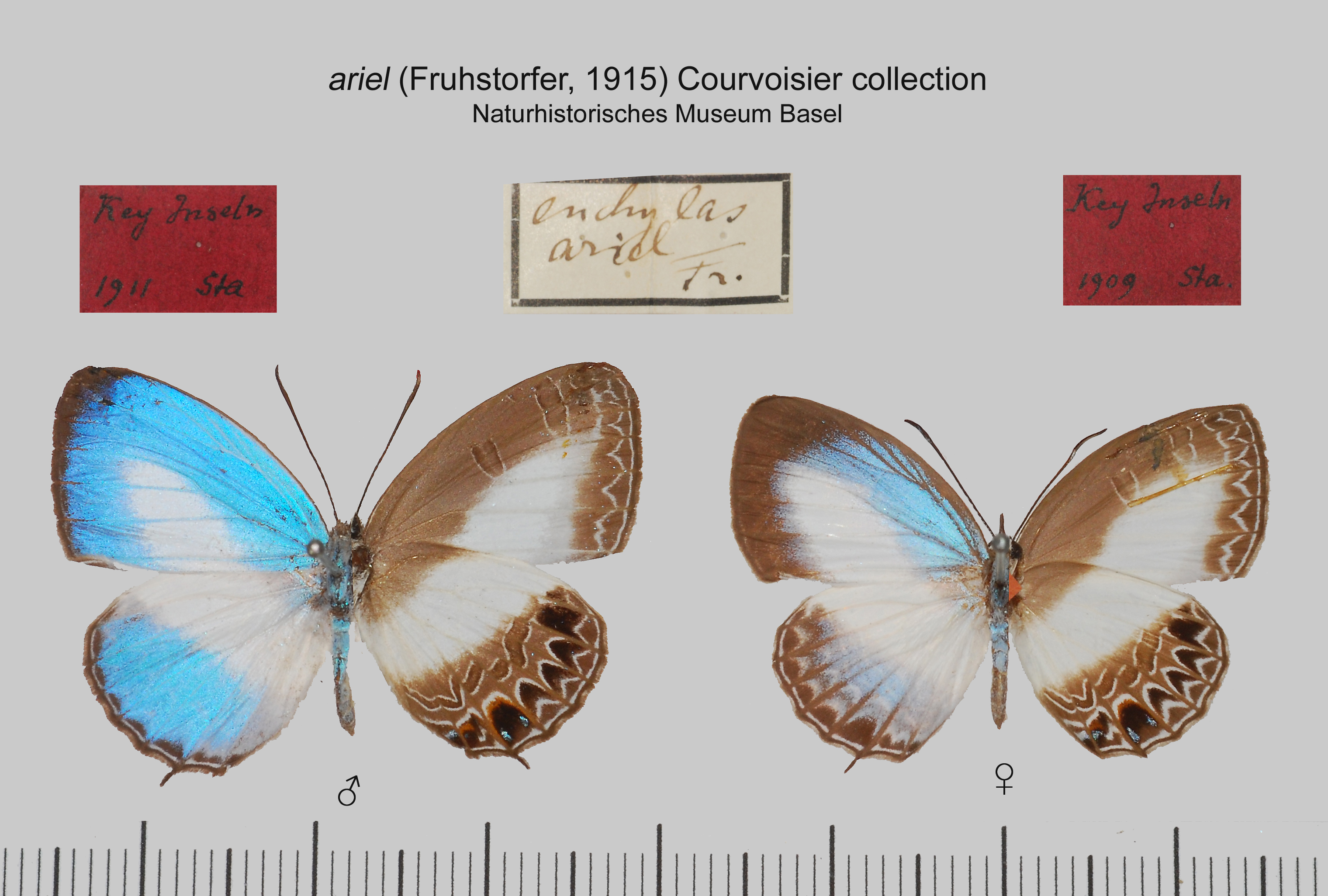
- Jamides aruensis ariel, Courvoisier Collection, Basel

Scientific classification
- Domain: Eukaryota
- Kingdom: Animalia
- Phylum: Arthropoda
- Class: Insecta
- Order: Lepidoptera
- Family: Lycaenidae
- Genus: Jamides
- Species: J. aruensis

Binomial name
- Jamides aruensis (Pagenstecher, 1884)

Synonyms
- Cupido euchylas var. aruensis Pagenstecher, 1884; Lampides euchylas ariel Fruhstorfer, 1915; Lampides euchylas gloriel Hulstaert, 1924; Lampides euchylas umbriel Fruhstorfer, 1915; Pepliphorus hylas waigeuensis Joicey & Talbot, 1917; Lampides euchylas poliamus Fruhstorfer, 1915; Peliphorus nemophila minor Rothschild, 1915; Lampides euchylas f. corana Fruhstorfer, 1915; Jamides aruensis dinawus Tite, 1960

= Jamides aruensis =

Species of butterfly

Jamides aruensis is a butterfly in the family Lycaenidae. It was described by Arnold Pagenstecher in 1884. It is found in New Guinea and the Aru Islands.

== Subspecies ==
- J. a. aruensis (Aru)
- J. a. ariel (Fruhstorfer, 1915) (Kai Island)
- J. a. gloriel (Hulstaert, 1924) (Kai Island)
- J. a. umbriel (Fruhstorfer, 1915) (Waigeu)
- J. a. poliamus (Fruhstorfer, 1915) (Misool, Salawati, West New Guinea)
- J. a. minor (Rothschild, 1915) (Utakwa)
- J. a. dinawus Tite, 1960 (Papua)

== Gallery ==
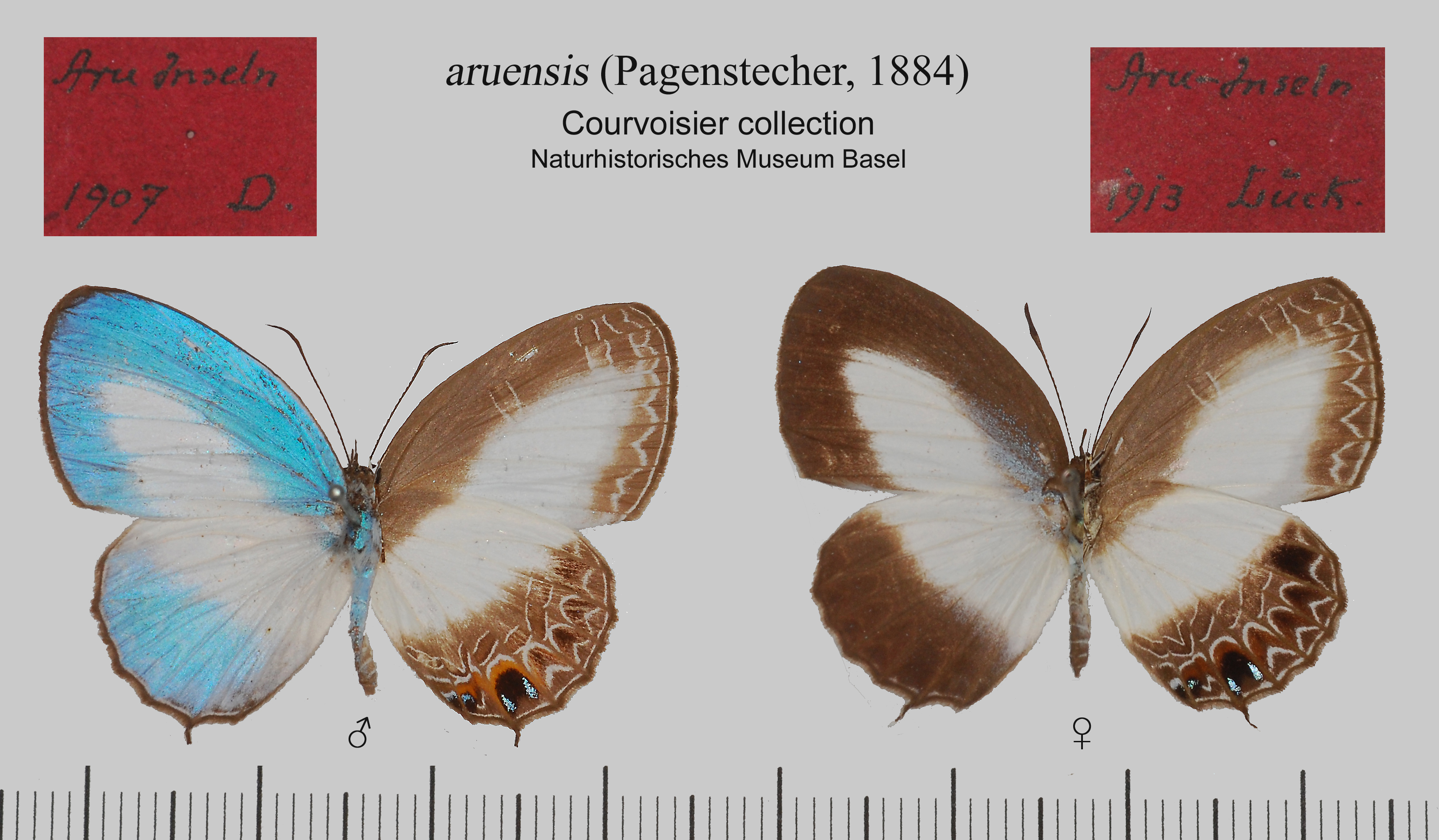
J. a. aruensis

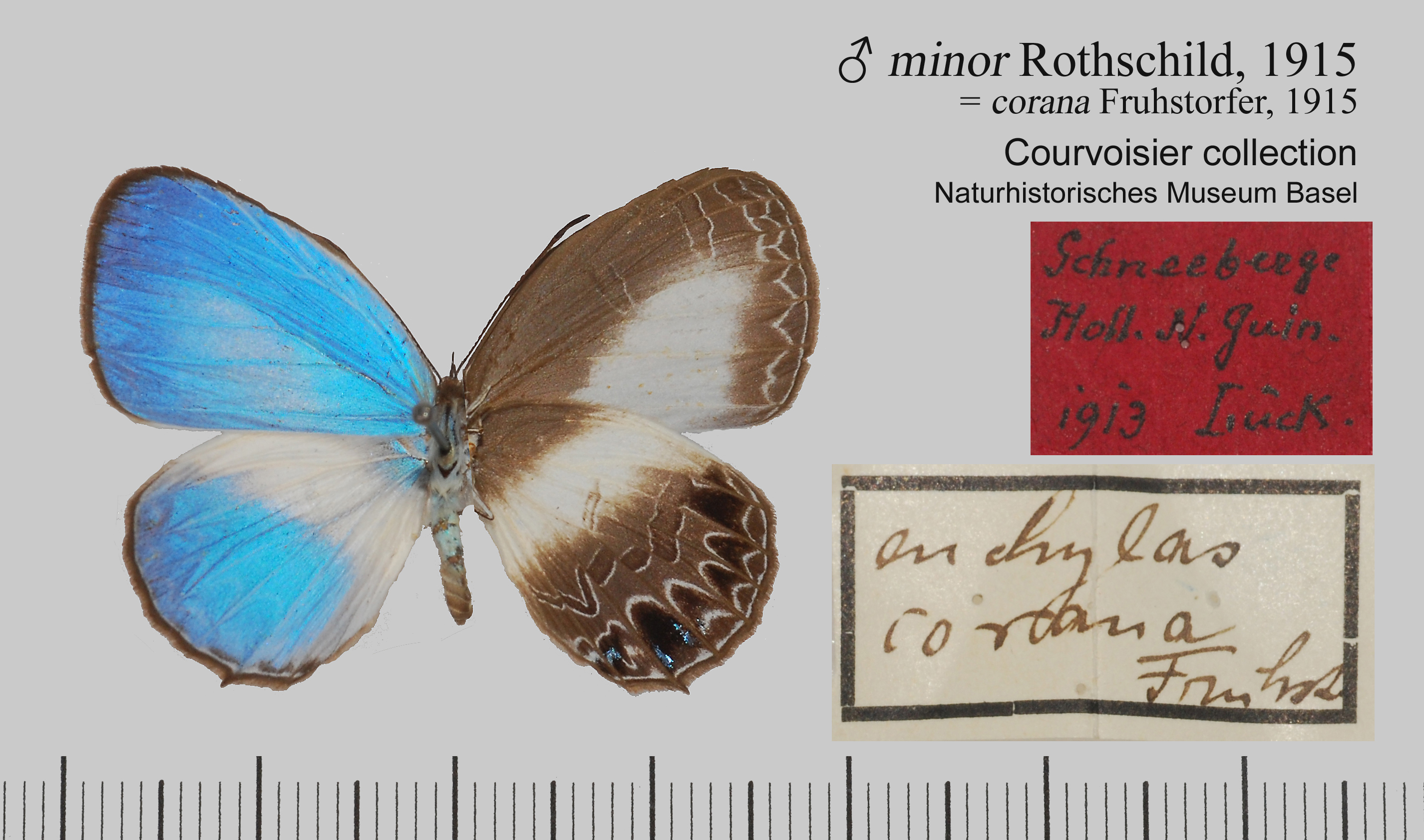
J. a. minor
