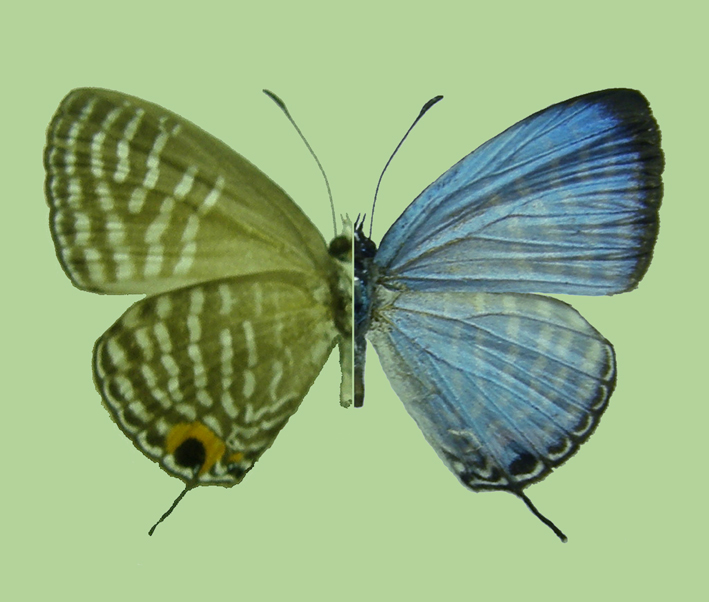
- Holotype, male, upperside (right) and underside (left), Palawan Islands

Scientific classification
- Kingdom: Animalia
- Phylum: Arthropoda
- Class: Insecta
- Order: Lepidoptera
- Family: Lycaenidae
- Genus: Jamides
- Species: J. aritai

Binomial name
- Jamides aritai (H. Hayashi, 1977)

Synonyms
- Jamides rothschildi aritai H. Hayashi, 1977 was changed the status to Jamides aritai by Cassidy A.C., 2013.

= Jamides aritai =

Species of butterfly

Jamides aritai is a butterfly of the family Lycaenidae. Forewing length: 15–19 mm. It is found in the Philippines, Sulawesi and northern and central Maluku. Two subspecies are described: nominotypical subspecies J. r. aritai is distributed through the Philippines, Sulawesi and Morotai in northern Maluku. Subspecies J. r. sabina is in central Maluku (Buru, Ceram and Ambon).

== Etymology ==
The specific name is dedicated to Dr. Yutaka Arita, professor emeritus of Meijo University in Nagoya.

== Subspecies ==
- Jamides aritai aritai H. Hayashi, [1977]
- Jamides aritai sabina Rawlins, Cassidy, et al., 2014
