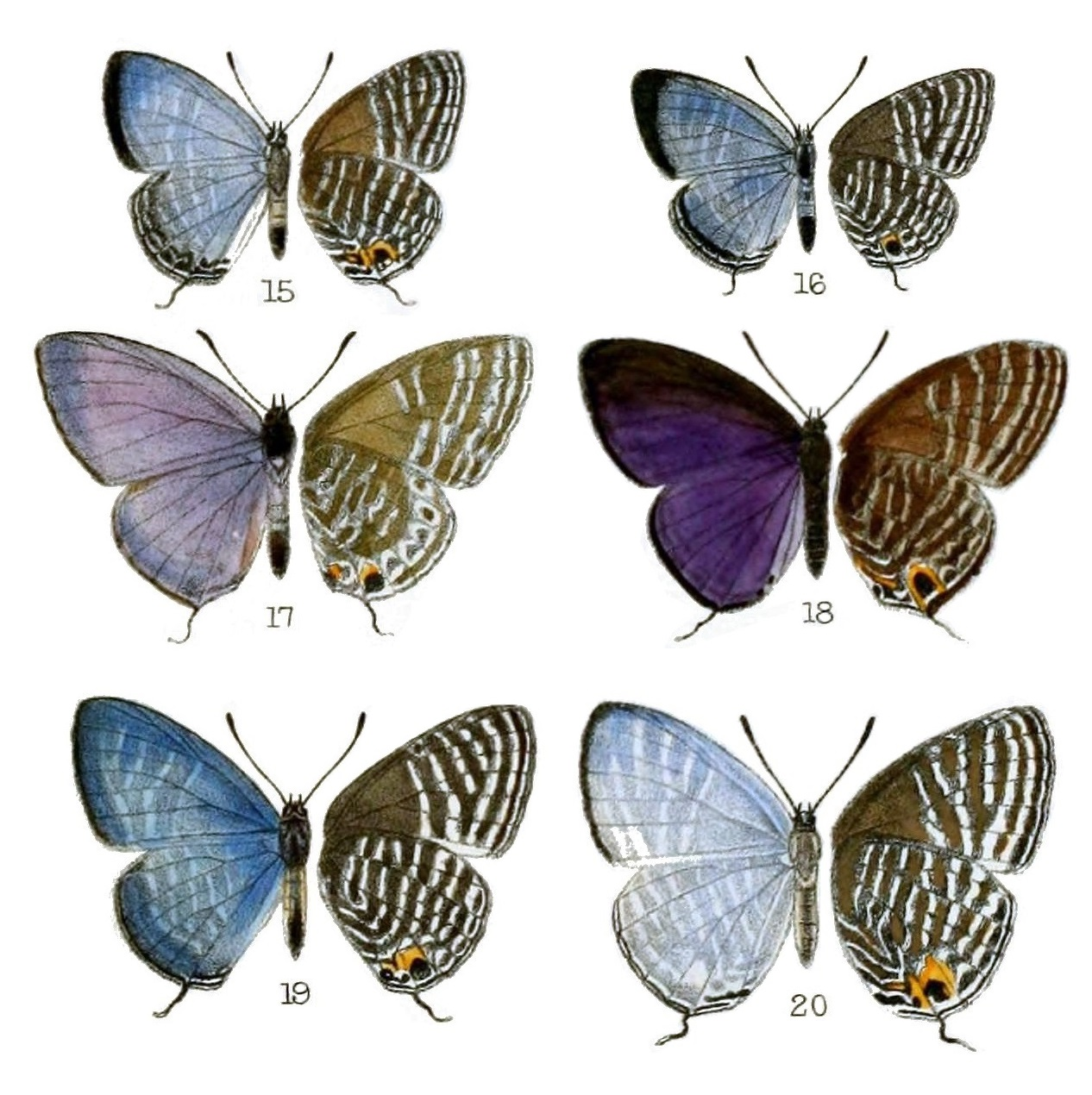
- 15. J. virgulatus, 16. J. caerulea, 17. J. cyta, 18. J. lugine, 19. J. limes, 20. J. zebra

Scientific classification
- Kingdom: Animalia
- Phylum: Arthropoda
- Class: Insecta
- Order: Lepidoptera
- Family: Lycaenidae
- Subfamily: Polyommatinae
- Tribe: Polyommatini
- Genus: Jamides; Hübner, [1819]

= Jamides =

Ceruleans

Butterfly genus in family Lycaenidae

Jamides, commonly called ceruleans, is a genus of butterflies in the family Lycaenidae. The species of this genus are found in the Indomalayan realm, the Palearctic realm and the Australasian realm.

== Species ==
Listed alphabetically:

- Jamides abdul (Distant, 1886)
- Jamides aetherialis (Butler, 1884) Moluccas, Raja Ampat Islands, Schouten Islands, New Guinea, Bismarck Islands, Solomon Islands
- Jamides alecto (Felder, 1860) – metallic cerulean (Ceylon, southern India, Sikkim, Burma, Malaysia, Ambon, Serang, Obi?, Bachan?, New Guinea)
- Jamides aleuas (C. & R. Felder, [1865])
- Jamides allectus (Grose-Smith, 1894)
- Jamides alsietus (Fruhstorfer, 1916) Philippines
- Jamides amarauge Druce, 1891 – amarauge cerulean (Darnley Island, Papua, New Guinea, West Irian?, Bougainville?, Shortlands, Gudalcanal, Florida Island)
- Jamides anops (Doherty, 1891) Lesser Sunda Islands
- Jamides aratus (Stoll, [1781])
- Jamides areas (Druce, 1891) Solomon Islands
- Jamides aritai Hayashi, [1977]
- Jamides aruensis (Pagenstecher, 1884)
- Jamides biru (Ribbe, 1926) Celebes
- Jamides bochus (Stoll, [1782]) – dark cerulean
- Jamides butleri (Rothschild, 1915) Obi Islands, Moluccas, Lease Islands, Gorong archipelago, Sula Islands, New Guinea
- Jamides caerulea (Druce, 1873) – royal cerulean (Assam, Burma, Malaya, Borneo, Java)
- Jamides callistus (Röber, 1886) Philippines, Borneo
- Jamides candrenus (Herrich-Schäffer, 1869)
- Jamides carissima (Butler, [1876]) New Hebrides, Loyalty Islands
- Jamides celebica (Eliot, 1969) Sulawesi
- Jamides celeno (Cramer, [1775]) – common cerulean (Sri Lanka, India, Indochina, Malaya, Celebes)
- Jamides cephion Druce, 1891 Solomon Islands
- Jamides cleodus (C. & R. Felder, [1865]) – white cerulean (Assam, Burma)
- Jamides coritus (Guérin-Méneville, 1829)
- Jamides coruscans (Moore, 1877) – Ceylon cerulean (Sri Lanka)
- Jamides cunilda (Snellen, 1896)
- Jamides cyta (Boisduval, 1832) − pale cerulean
- Jamides elioti Hirowatari & Cassidy, 1994 – Eliot's caerulean (Sulawesi)
- Jamides elpis (Godart, [1824]) – glistening cerulean (Assam, Indochina, Malaya, Celebes, Timor, Wetar?, Kissar)
- Jamides epilectus (Grose-Smith, 1897) Fergusson Island
- Jamides euchylas (Hübner, [1819]) Seram, Ambon, Saparua, Geser
- Jamides ferrari Evans, 1932 − Ferrar's cerulean
- Jamides festivus (Röber, 1886)
- Jamides fractilinea Tite, 1960 Sulawesi, Sula Island
- Jamides goodenovii (Butler, 1876) Goodenough Island, Woodlark Island
- Jamides halus Takanami, 1994 Sulawesi, Buru
- Jamides kankena (Felder, 1862) – glistening cerulean
- Jamides lacteata (de Nicéville, 1895) – milky cerulean
- Jamides limes (Druce, 1895)
- Jamides lucide de Nicéville, 1894 Sumatra, Borneo
- Jamides lugine (Druce, 1895)
- Jamides malaccanus (Röber, 1886)
- Jamides nemea (Felder, 1860) = Jamides cyta nemea (Felder, 1860)
- Jamides nemophilus (Butler, 1876) New Guinea, Fergusson, Goodenough, Trobriand, Darnley Islands, Bismarck Archipelago, Rook Island
- Jamides nitens (Joicey & Talbot, 1916) New Guinea
- Jamides parasaturatus (Fruhstorfer, 1916)
- Jamides petunia Druce, 1887
- Jamides phaseli (Mathew, 1889)
- Jamides philatus (Snellen, 1878) – Burmese caerulean
- Jamides pseudosias (Rothschild, 1915) Halmahera, Bacan, Obi, Seram, Misool, Ambon, Sulawesi, Sula Islands, New Guinea
- Jamides pulcherrima Butler, 1884 New Hebrides
- Jamides puloensis Tite, 1960 Borneo
- Jamides pura (Moore, 1886) – white cerulean
- Jamides purpurata Grose-Smith, 1894 1894 New Guinea, Manam, Karkar, Fergusson, Tagula Islands
- Jamides reverdini (Fruhstorfer, 1915) New Guinea
- Jamides sabatus (Fruhstorfer, 1916) Philippines
- Jamides schatzi (Röber, 1886) Halmahera, Ternate, Kayoa, Bacan, Sulawesi, Talaud, Sangihe, Philippines
- Jamides seminiger Grose-Smith, 1895 Halmahera, Bacan, Obi, Buru, Seram, Ambon, Sula, Watubela Island, Kei Islands, Aru Islands
- Jamides snelleni (Röber, 1886) – Snellen's cerulean (Celebes)
- Jamides soemias Druce, 1891 Bismarck Archipelago, Bougainville, Shortlands, Florida Island, Malaita, New Britain, Dampier Island, Vulcan Island
- Jamides suidas (C. & R. Felder, [1865]) Philippines
- Jamides talinga (Kheil, 1884)
- Jamides tsukadai Takanami, 1994 Sulawesi
- Jamides uniformis Rothschild, 1915 Admiralty Islands
- Jamides virgulatus (Druce, 1895)
- Jamides walkeri Druce, 1892 1892 "South Pacific Islands", Austral Island
- Jamides yehi Eliot, 1995 Malaya
- Jamides zebra (Druce, 1895)
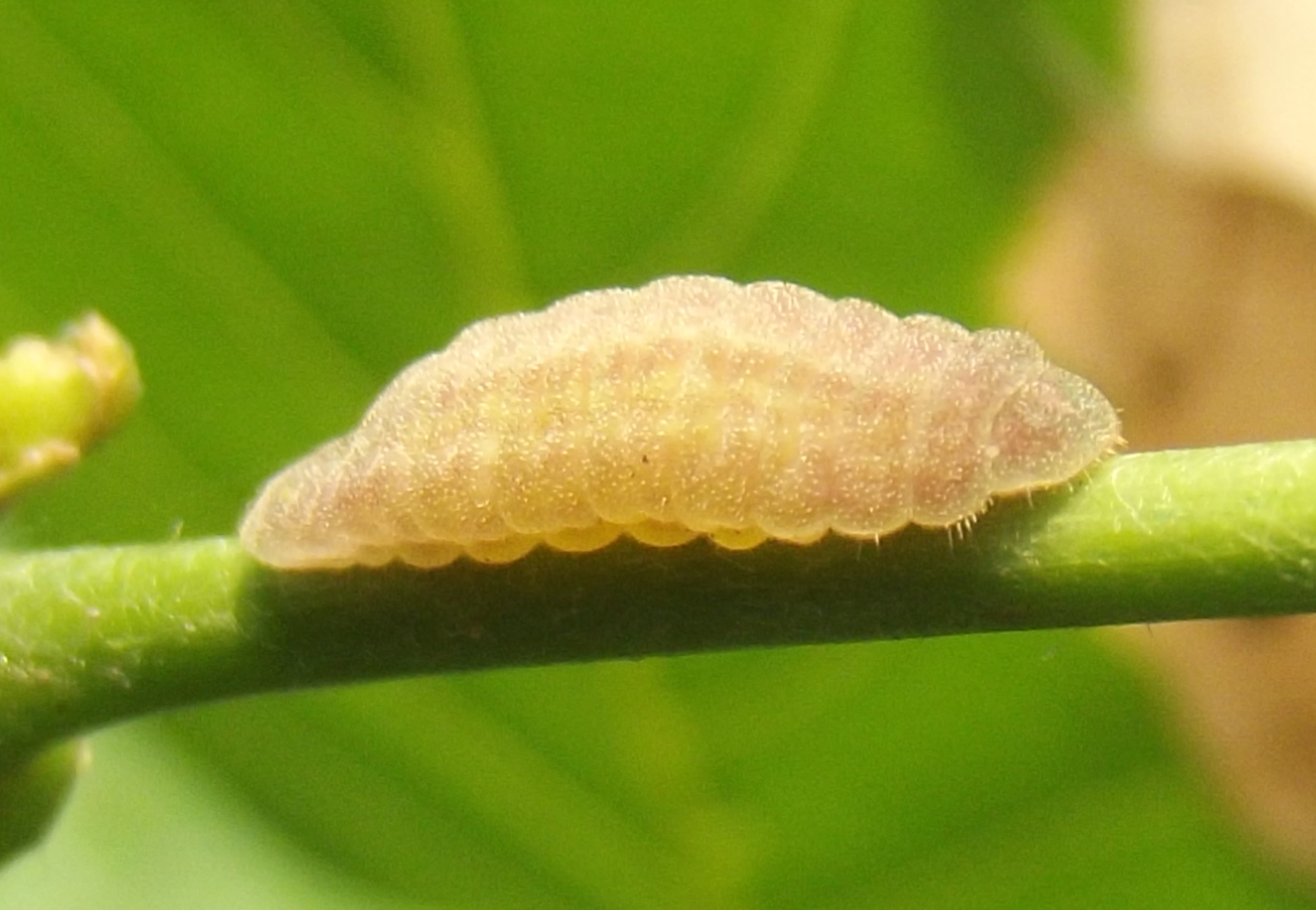
J. celeno larva

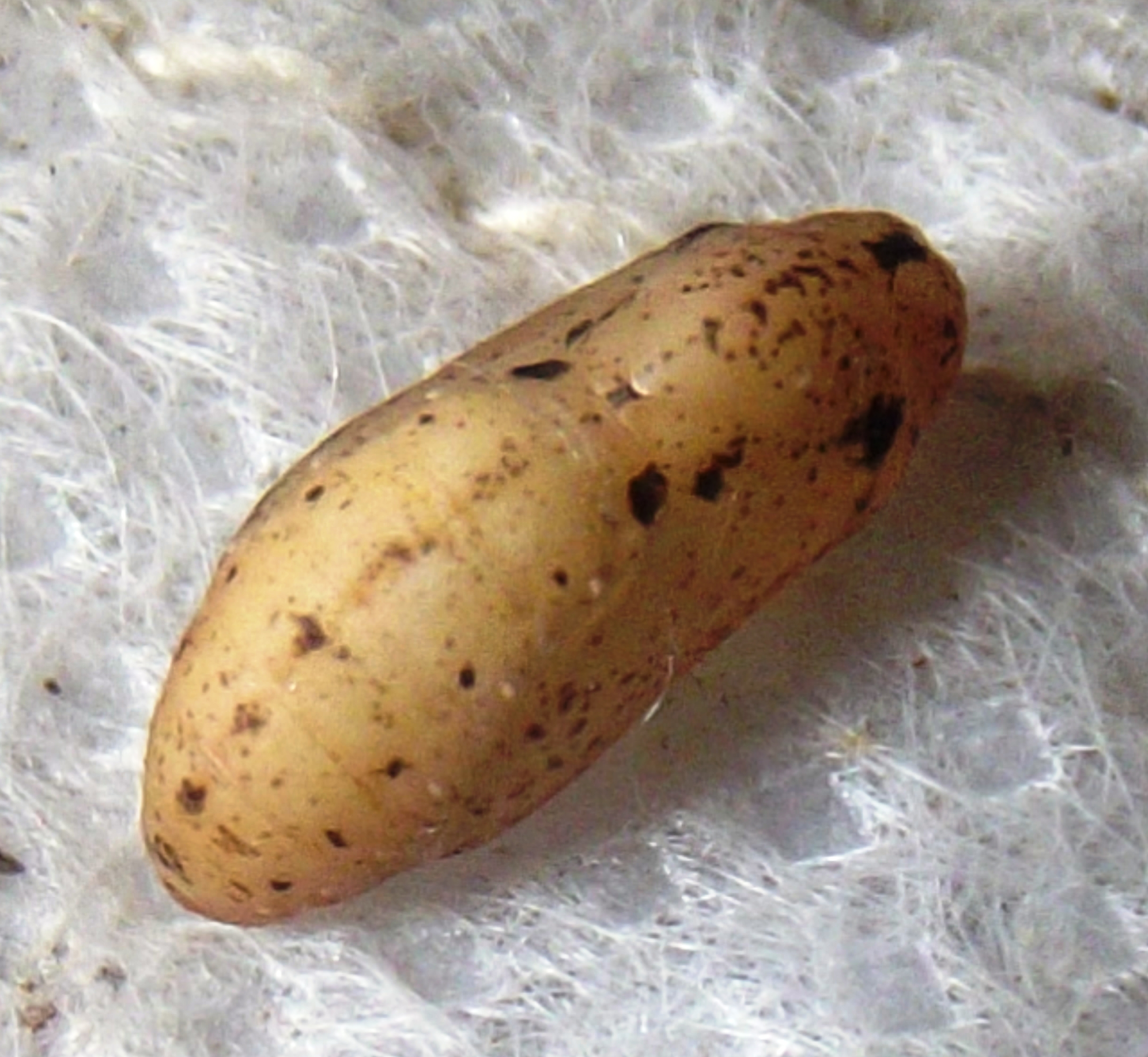
J. celeno pupa

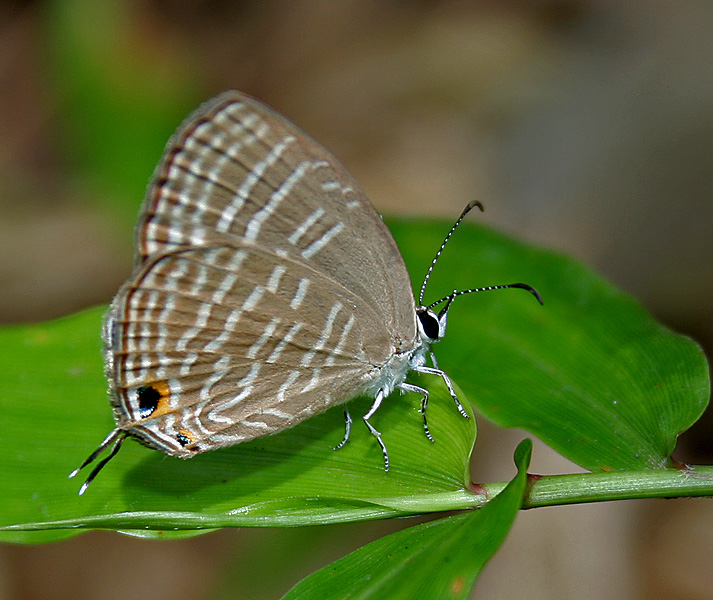
J. celeno imago

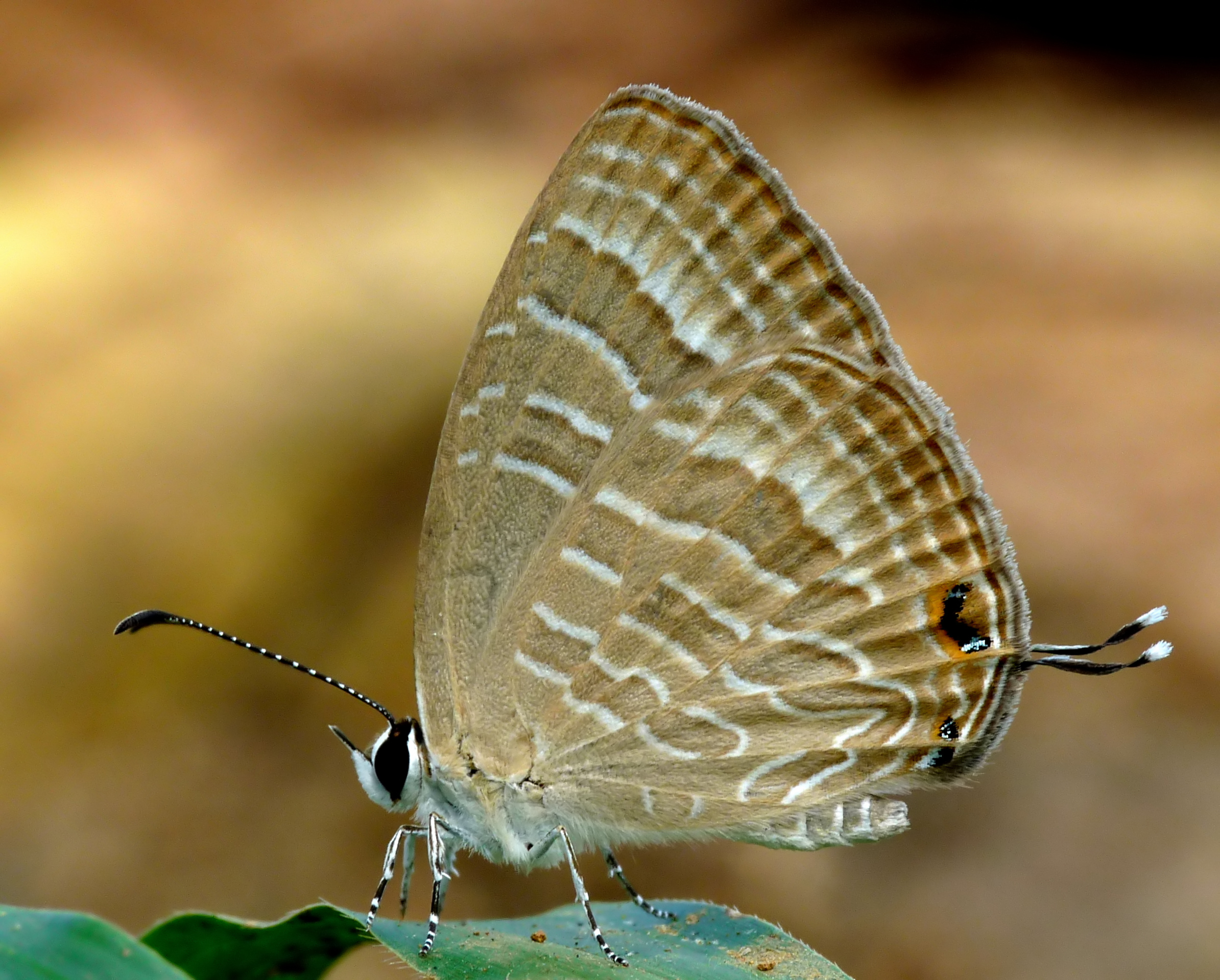
J. celeno imago
