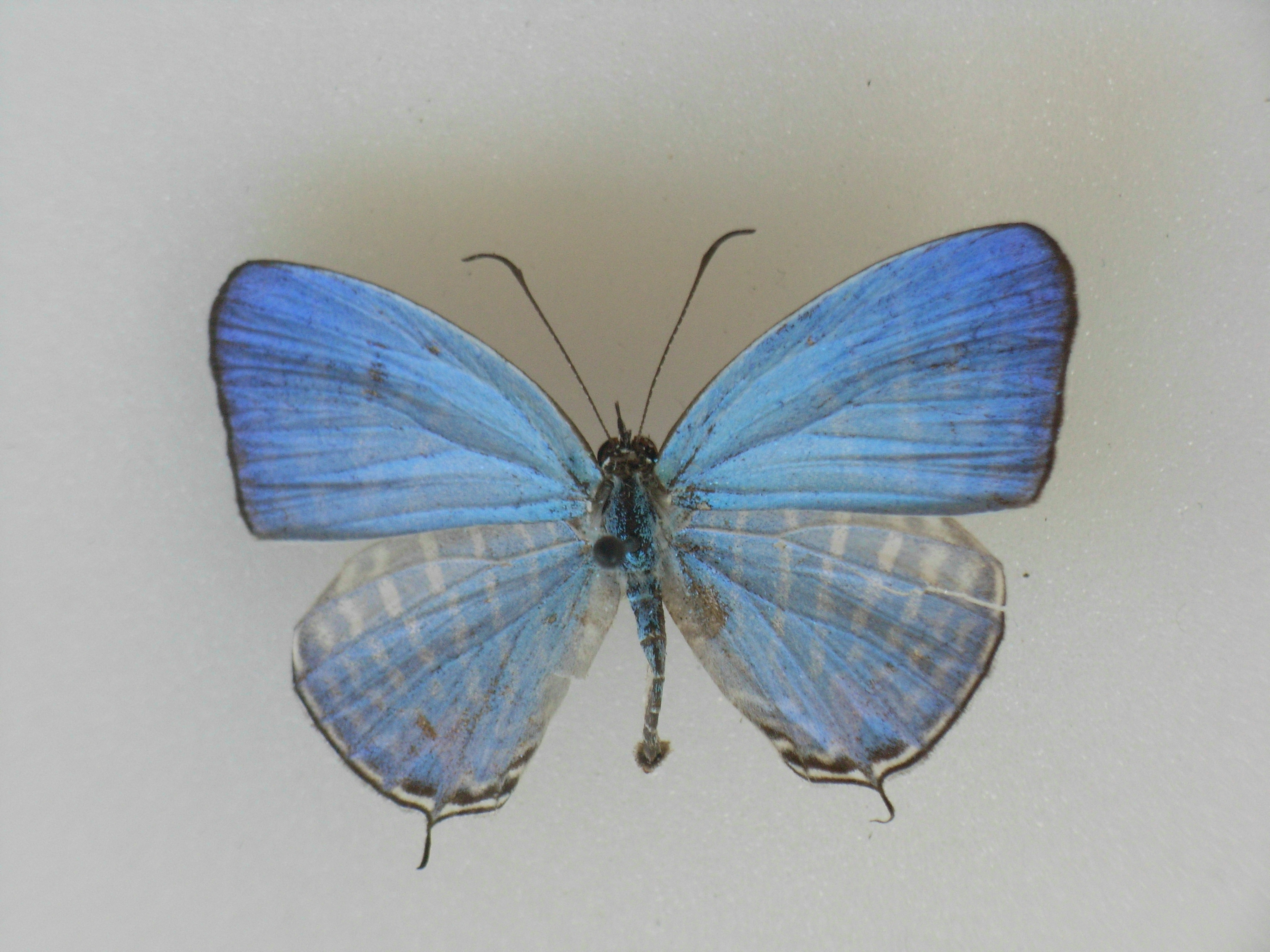

Scientific classification
- Kingdom: Animalia
- Phylum: Arthropoda
- Class: Insecta
- Order: Lepidoptera
- Family: Lycaenidae
- Genus: Jamides
- Species: J. parasaturatus

Binomial name
- Jamides parasaturatus (Fruhstorfer, 1916)

Synonyms
- Lampides parasaturata Fruhstorfer, 1916

= Jamides parasaturatus =

Species of butterfly

Jamides parasaturatus is a butterfly of the family Lycaenidae. It is found in Sumatra and Peninsular Malaysia. It is pale, translucent (allowing the underside striae to be visible from above) blue.

== Subspecies ==
- Jamides parasaturatus parasaturatus (Sumatra)
- Jamides parasaturatus paramalaccanus (Peninsular Malaya)
