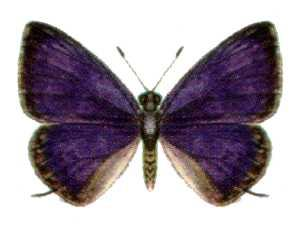

Scientific classification
- Domain: Eukaryota
- Kingdom: Animalia
- Phylum: Arthropoda
- Class: Insecta
- Order: Lepidoptera
- Family: Lycaenidae
- Genus: Jamides
- Species: J. phaseli

Binomial name
- Jamides phaseli (Mathew, 1889)

Synonyms
- Lampides phaseli Mathew, 1889; Lycaena oranigra Lucas, 1889

= Jamides phaseli =

Species of butterfly

Jamides phaseli, the dark cerulean, is a butterfly in the family Lycaenidae. It was described by Gervase Frederick Mathew in 1889. It is found in north-eastern Australia, from Cape York to south-eastern Queensland, as well as in the Northern Territory. It is also present on the Torres Strait Islands.
