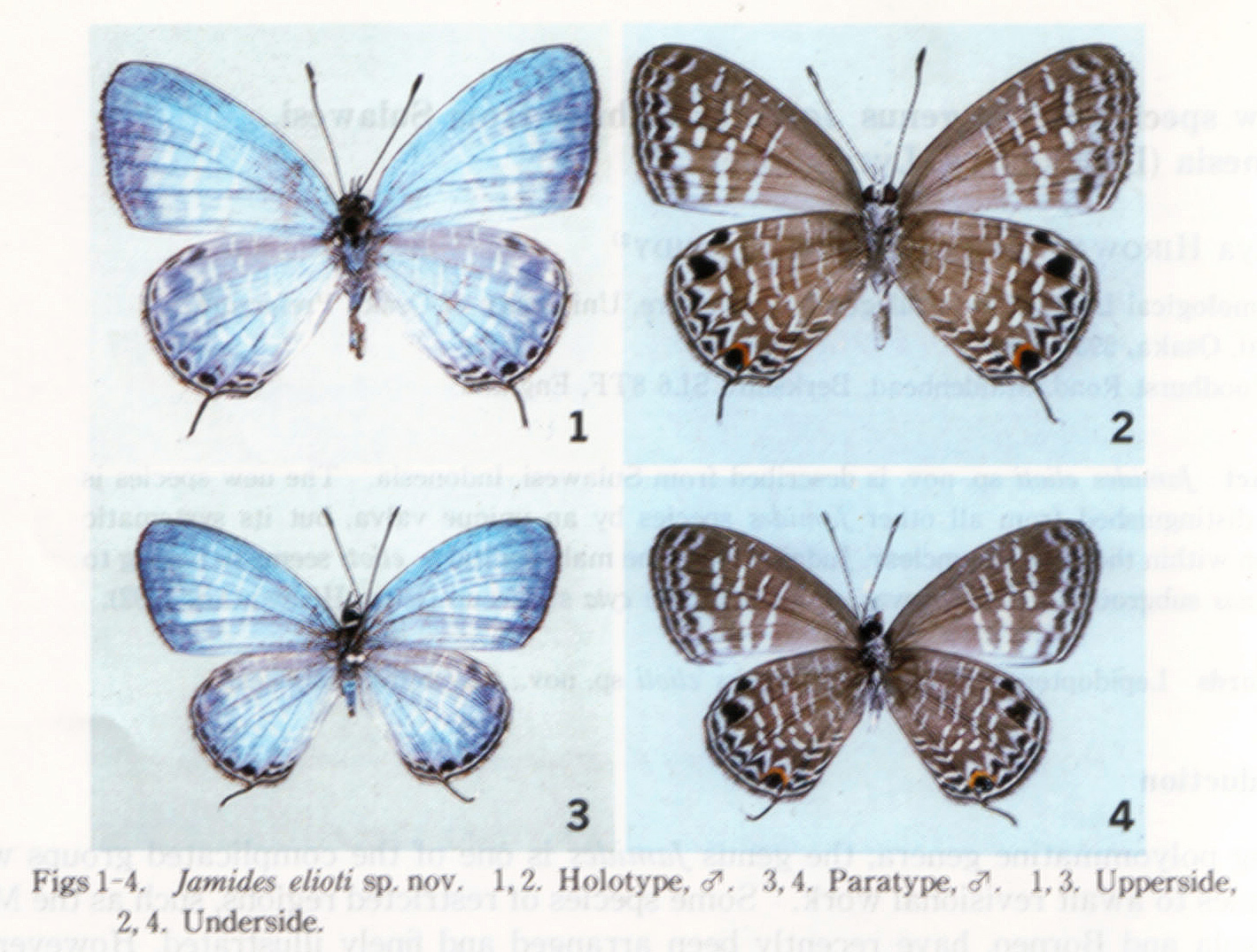

Scientific classification
- Domain: Eukaryota
- Kingdom: Animalia
- Phylum: Arthropoda
- Class: Insecta
- Order: Lepidoptera
- Family: Lycaenidae
- Genus: Jamides
- Species: J. elioti

Binomial name
- Jamides elioti Hirowatari & Cassidy, 1994

= Jamides elioti =

Species of butterfly

Jamides elioti is a butterfly of the lycaenids or blues family. It is found in Sulawesi.
