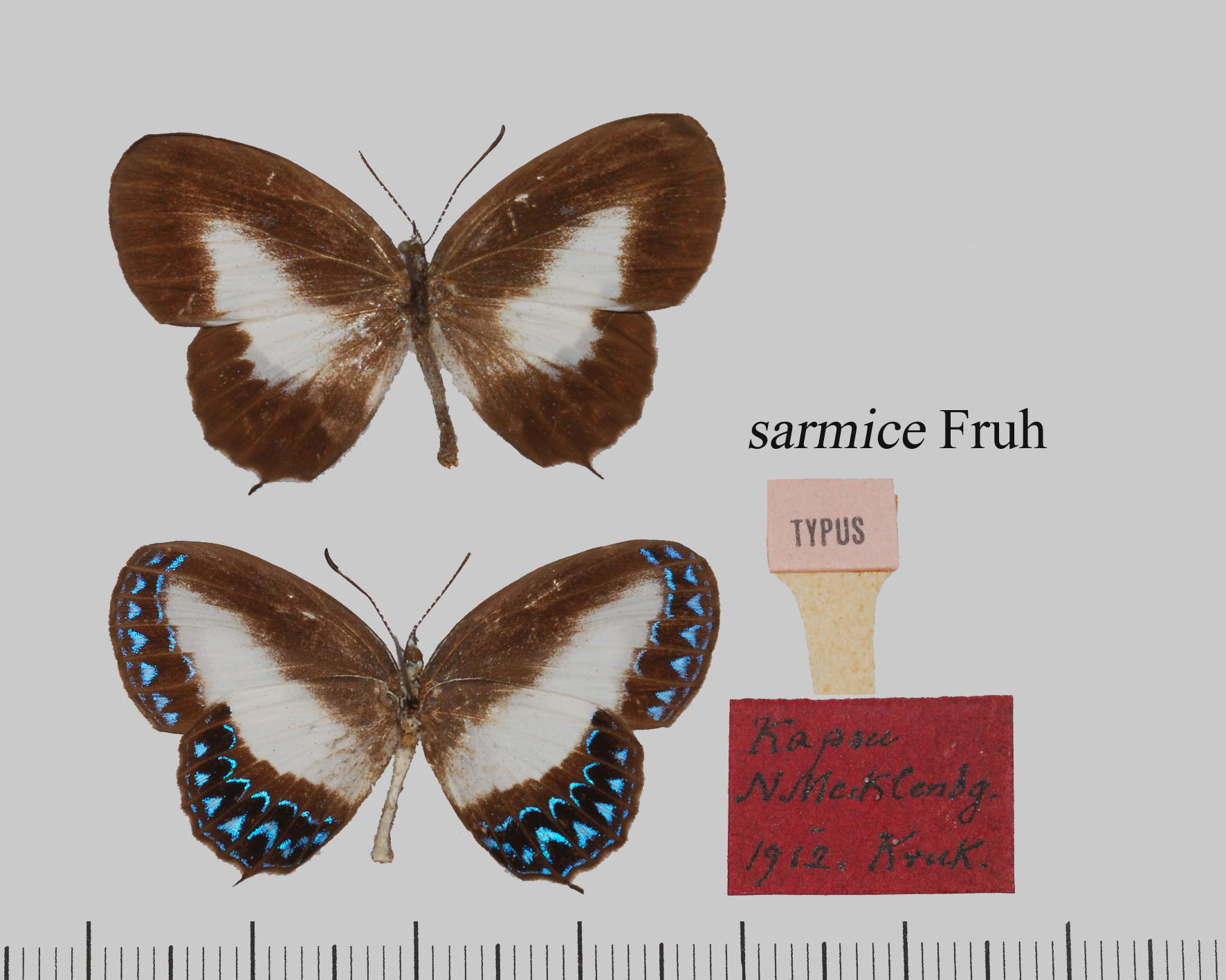
- Jamides allectus sarmice Holotype. From the Courvoisier Collection, Basel, Switzerland

Scientific classification
- Kingdom: Animalia
- Phylum: Arthropoda
- Class: Insecta
- Order: Lepidoptera
- Family: Lycaenidae
- Genus: Jamides
- Species: J. allectus

Binomial name
- Jamides allectus (Grose-Smith, 1894).

Synonyms
- Lampides allectus Grose-Smith, 1894; Lampides aleuas sarmice Fruhstorfer, 1915

= Jamides allectus =

Species of butterfly

Jamides allectus is a butterfly in the family Lycaenidae. It was described by Henley Grose-Smith in 1894. It is endemic to New Guinea (West Irian and New Ireland).

== Subspecies ==
- J. a. allectus (Irian Jaya)
- J. a. jobiensis Tite, 1960 (Jobi)
- J. a. sarmice (Fruhstorfer, 1916) (New Ireland)
