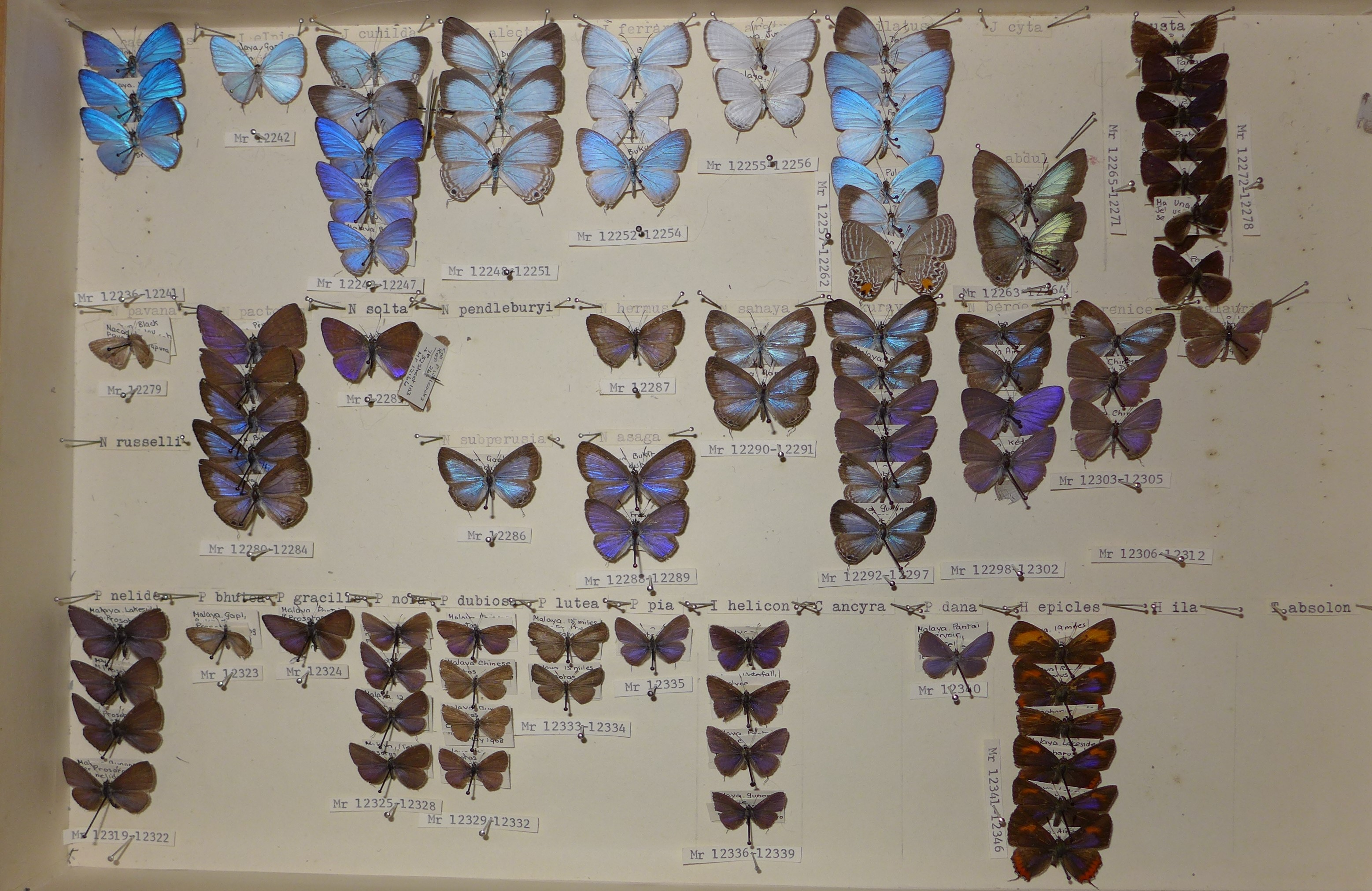
- Jamides ferrari in a collection of Lycaenidae from Malaya

Scientific classification
- Kingdom: Animalia
- Phylum: Arthropoda
- Class: Insecta
- Order: Lepidoptera
- Family: Lycaenidae
- Genus: Jamides
- Species: J. ferrari

Binomial name
- Jamides ferrari Evans, 1932

= Jamides ferrari =

Ferrar's cerulean

Species of butterfly

Jamides ferrari, commonly known as Ferrar's cerulean, is a small butterfly found in India that belongs to the lycaenids or blues family. It is named after Michael Lloyd Ferrar. The subspecies Jamides ferrari evansi Riley and Corbet, 1938, is found in Malaya.

== See also ==
- List of butterflies of India
- List of butterflies of India (Lycaenidae)
