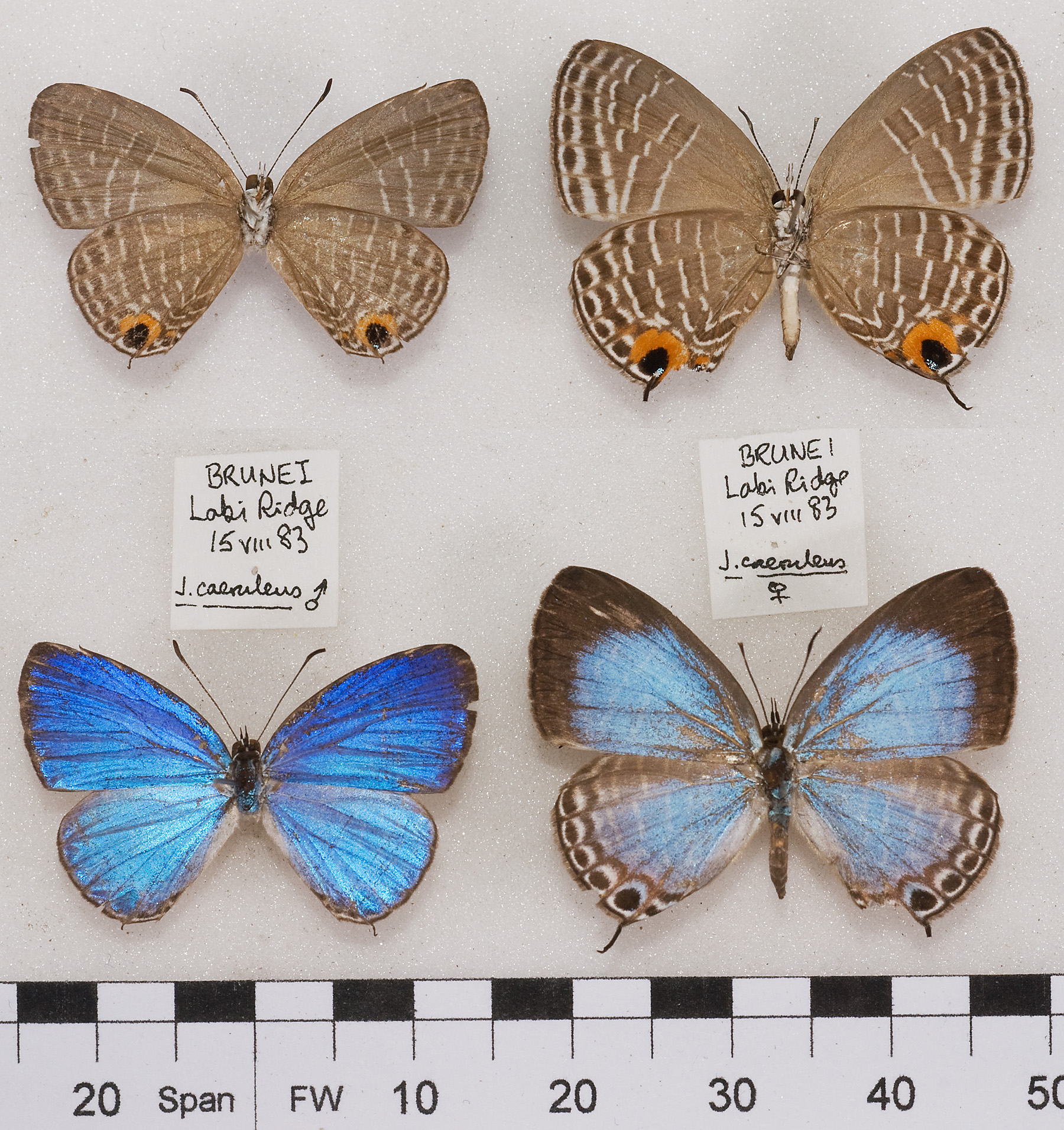

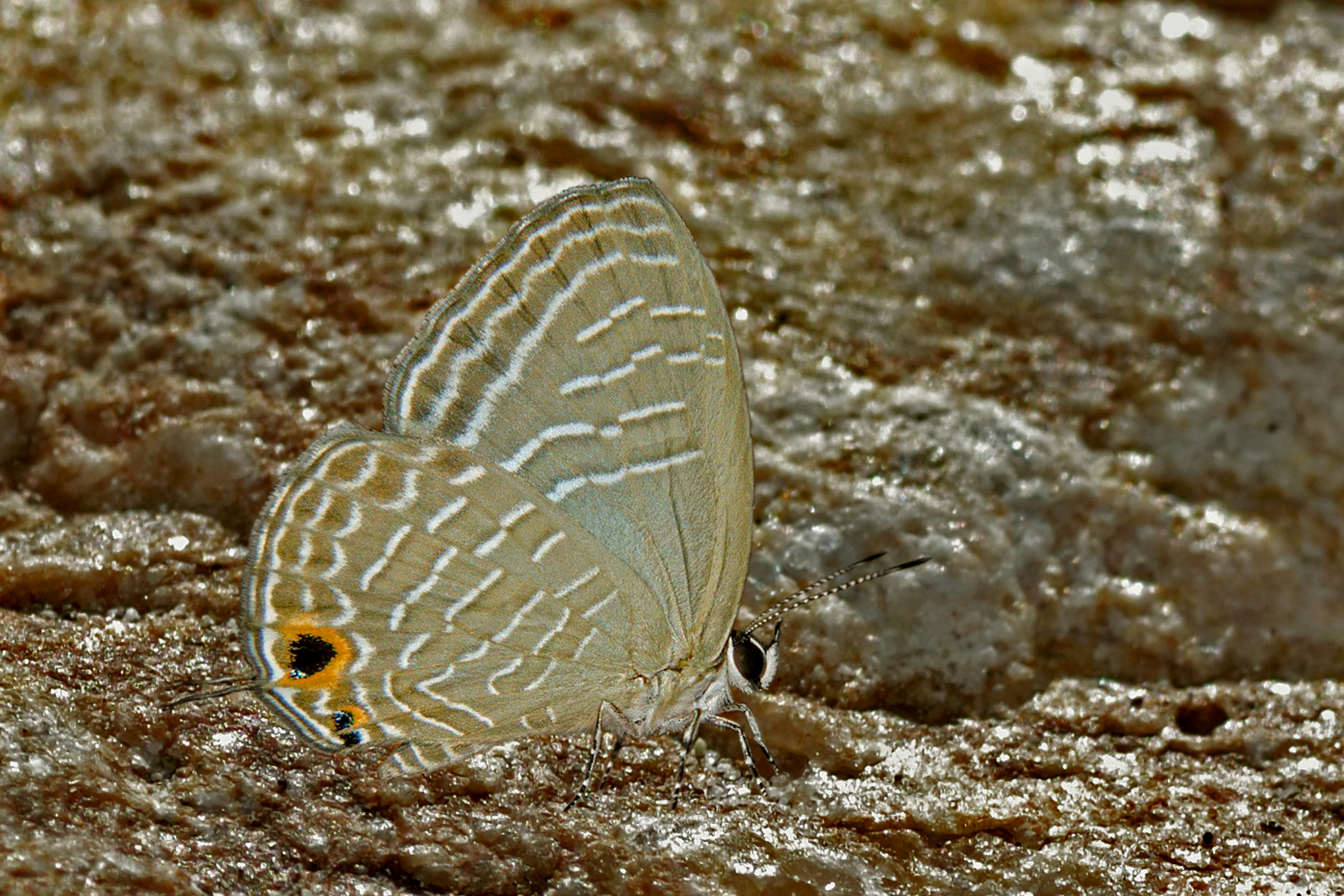

Scientific classification
- Domain: Eukaryota
- Kingdom: Animalia
- Phylum: Arthropoda
- Class: Insecta
- Order: Lepidoptera
- Family: Lycaenidae
- Genus: Jamides
- Species: J. caerulea

Binomial name
- Jamides caerulea (H. Druce 1873)

Synonyms
- Cupido caerulea H. Druce, 1873; Jamides caeruleus; Lampides bochides de Nicéville, 1891; Lampides kankena metallica Fruhstorfer, 1916; Lampides kankena selvagia Fruhstorfer, 1915

= Jamides caerulea =

Royal cerulean

Species of butterfly

Jamides caerulea, the royal cerulean, is a small butterfly that belongs to the lycaenids or blues family. It was described by Herbert Druce in 1873. It is found in the Indomalayan realm.

== Subspecies ==
- Jamides caerulea caerulea (Burma to Singapore, Sumatra, Borneo)
- Jamides caerulea metallica (Fruhstorfer, 1916) (Java)
- Jamides caerulea selvagia (Fruhstorfer, 1915) (Simalue)

== See also ==
- List of butterflies of India
- List of butterflies of India (Lycaenidae)
