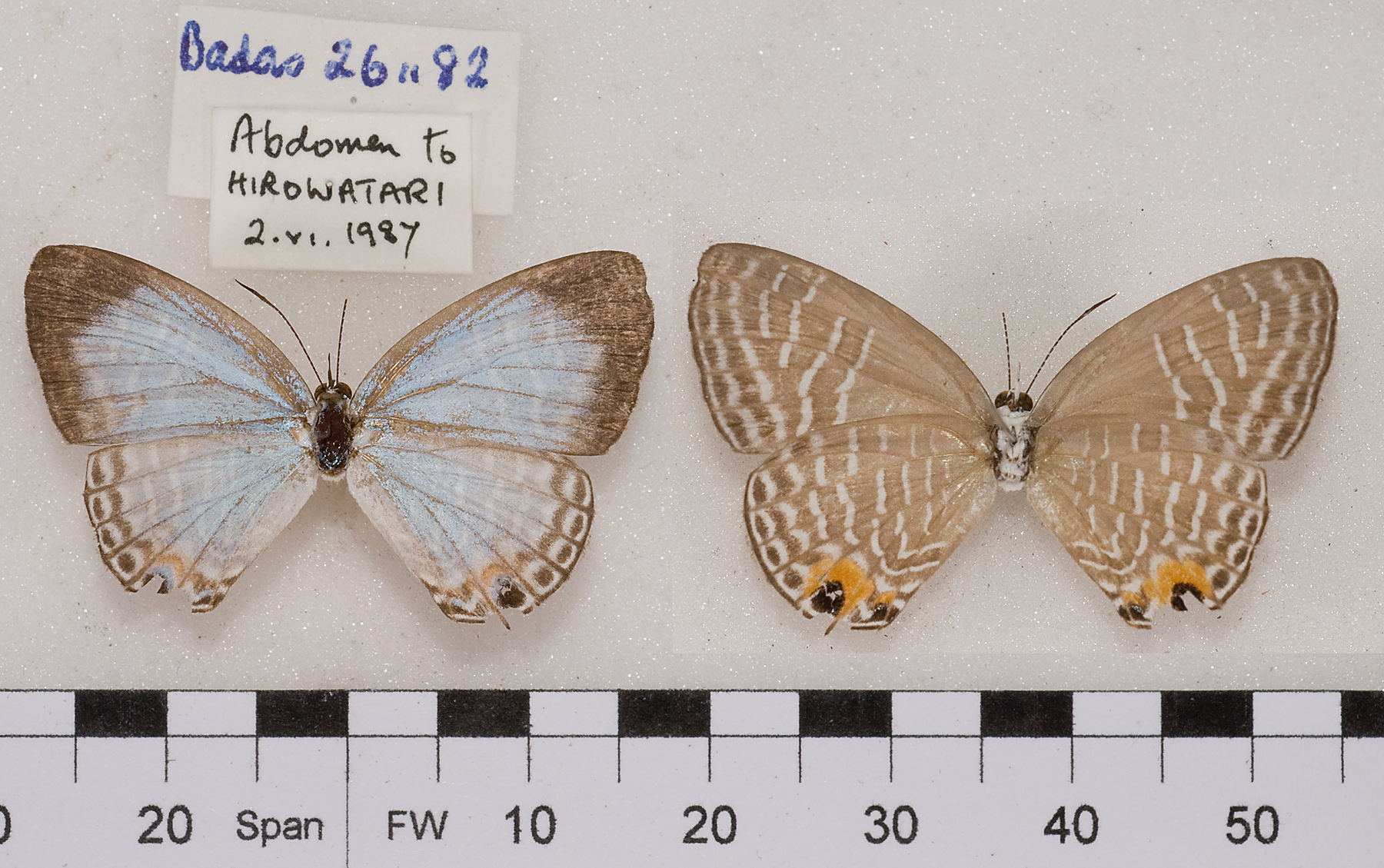

Scientific classification
- Domain: Eukaryota
- Kingdom: Animalia
- Phylum: Arthropoda
- Class: Insecta
- Order: Lepidoptera
- Family: Lycaenidae
- Genus: Jamides
- Species: J. limes

Binomial name
- Jamides limes (H. H. Druce, 1895)

Synonyms
- Lampides limes H. H. Druce, 1895

= Jamides limes =

Species of butterfly

Jamides limes is a butterfly of the lycaenids or blues family. It is found on Borneo.
