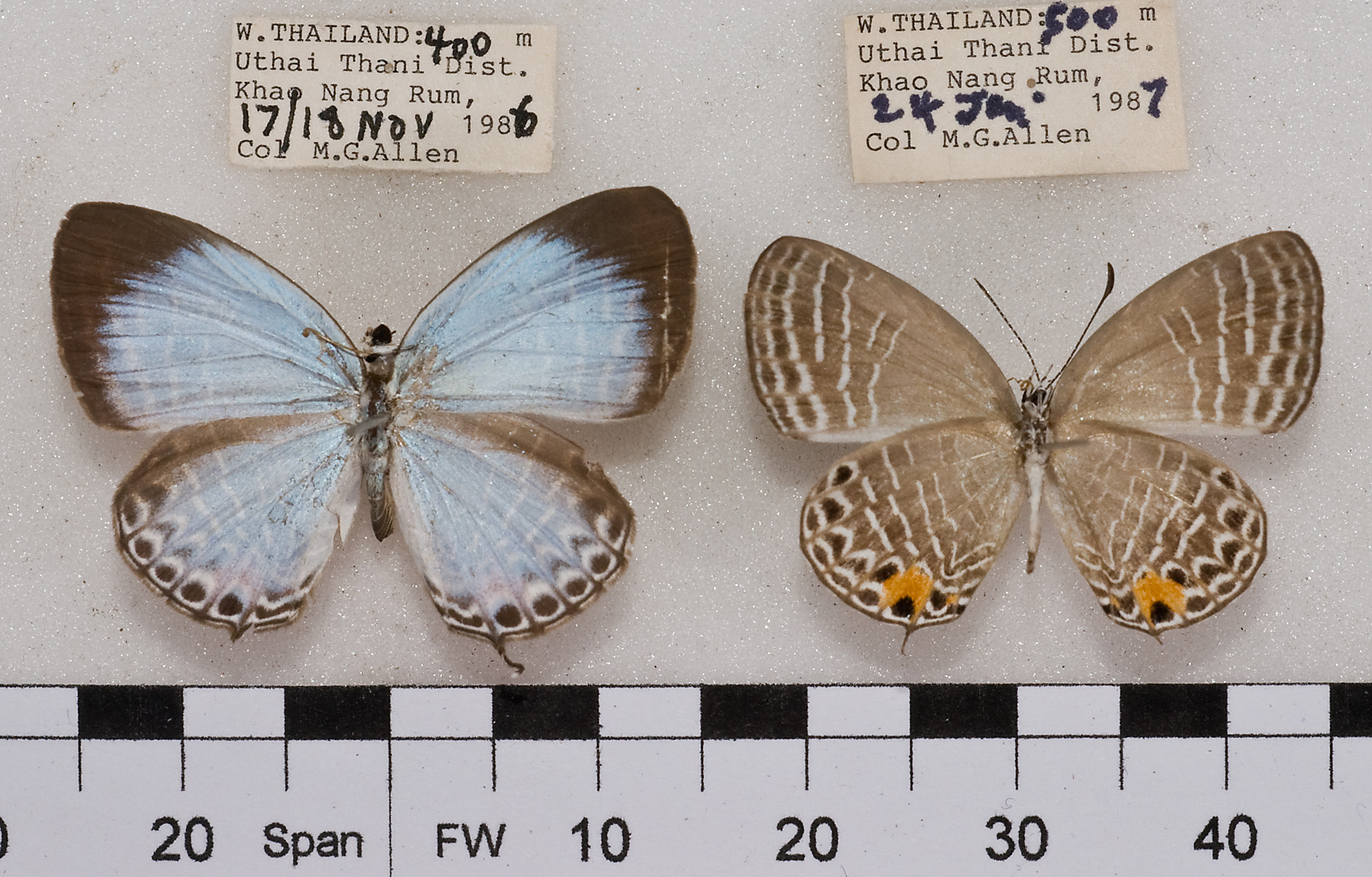
- Jamides philatus subditus, female, set specimens, Thailand

Scientific classification
- Kingdom: Animalia
- Phylum: Arthropoda
- Clade: Pancrustacea
- Class: Insecta
- Order: Lepidoptera
- Family: Lycaenidae
- Genus: Jamides
- Species: J. philatus

Binomial name
- Jamides philatus (Snellen, 1877)

= Jamides philatus =

Species of butterfly

Jamides philatus, the Burmese caerulean, is a butterfly in the family Lycaenidae. It was described by Pieter Cornelius Tobias Snellen in 1877. It is found in the Indomalayan realm. It is a polytypical, widely distributed species is in many of its forms recognizable by an almost black distal part of the wings beneath with very bright white markings contrasting with a proximal lighter and more uniformly coloured part.

== Subspecies ==
- J. p. philatus Sulawesi, Banggai, Sula
- J. p. callinicus (Röber, 1886) . Ceram Male above entirely whitish without a real margin, nor any distal-marginal marking on the hindwing. Beneath the white transverse stripes are divided into streaks of about 2 mm length; before the margin of the hindwing high cucullate spots. Female greyish-blue with a broad blackish-grey margin.
- J. p. subditus (Moore, 1886) Burma - Peninsular Malaya The male is above quite light lavender blue.The under surface has two proximal submarginal stripes enclosing a row of dark spots, whereas the most proximal one of these lines in the hindwing exhibits high cucullate spots with pointed vertices; the honey-coloured subanal spot is very large (de Niceville)
- J. p. osias Röber, 1886) Philippines Black distal part of the wings beneath with very bright white markings contrasting with a proximal lighter and more uniformly coloured part.
- J. p. amphyssina (Staudinger, 1889) Palawan Male above sky-blue, the hindwing in the disc with a scarcely noticeably lighter reflection; beneath brownish-grey with white cucullate spots (distinct and numerous particularly in the proximal half of the hindwing).
- J. p. telanjang (Doherty, 1891) Basal blue projects angularly into the black distal-marginal part of the forewing above.
- J. p. emetallicus (Druce, 1895) Underside : ground-colour dark ( compared to ossias, the lines narrower and more irregular; the ground colour between the two submarginal zigzag lines of the fore wing distinctly darker than the rest of the wing. Hind wing: a very small orange spot close to the margin, just above the submedian nervure; the black spot between the Ist and 2nd median nervules only, crowned with orange and without any metallic-blue scales whatever.
- J. p. stresemanni (Rothschild, 1915) Serang Recto forewing bright blue metallic, hindwing silvery bine washed slightly with darker blue.Verso, differs from second postdiscal white line, not the first, and the antemedian instead of the median complete. On hindwing the white hues on basal two-thirds of wing narrower and less distinct, the black triangles edged with white more acute and only one yellow patch above tail.
- J. p. arius (Fruhstorfer, 1916) Sumatra Under surface lighter grey. The blackish submarginal band of the forewing intense.
- J. p. arcaseius (Fruhstorfer, 1916) Nias Lighter blue, with a brighter silky lustre. Under surface with more prominent white transverse strokes and a large yellow subanal spot. In the female the upper surface is lighter, almost whitish-blue, the black margin of the forewing narrow.
- J. p. athanetus (Fruhstorfer, 1916) Java In the female the upper surface is light blue, the black distal margin narrow. Beneath dark grey.
- J. p. armatheus (Fruhstorfer, 1916) Borneo
- J. p. aegithus (Fruhstorfer, 1916) Waigiu
- J. p. fasciatus (Ribbe, 1926) Celebes
