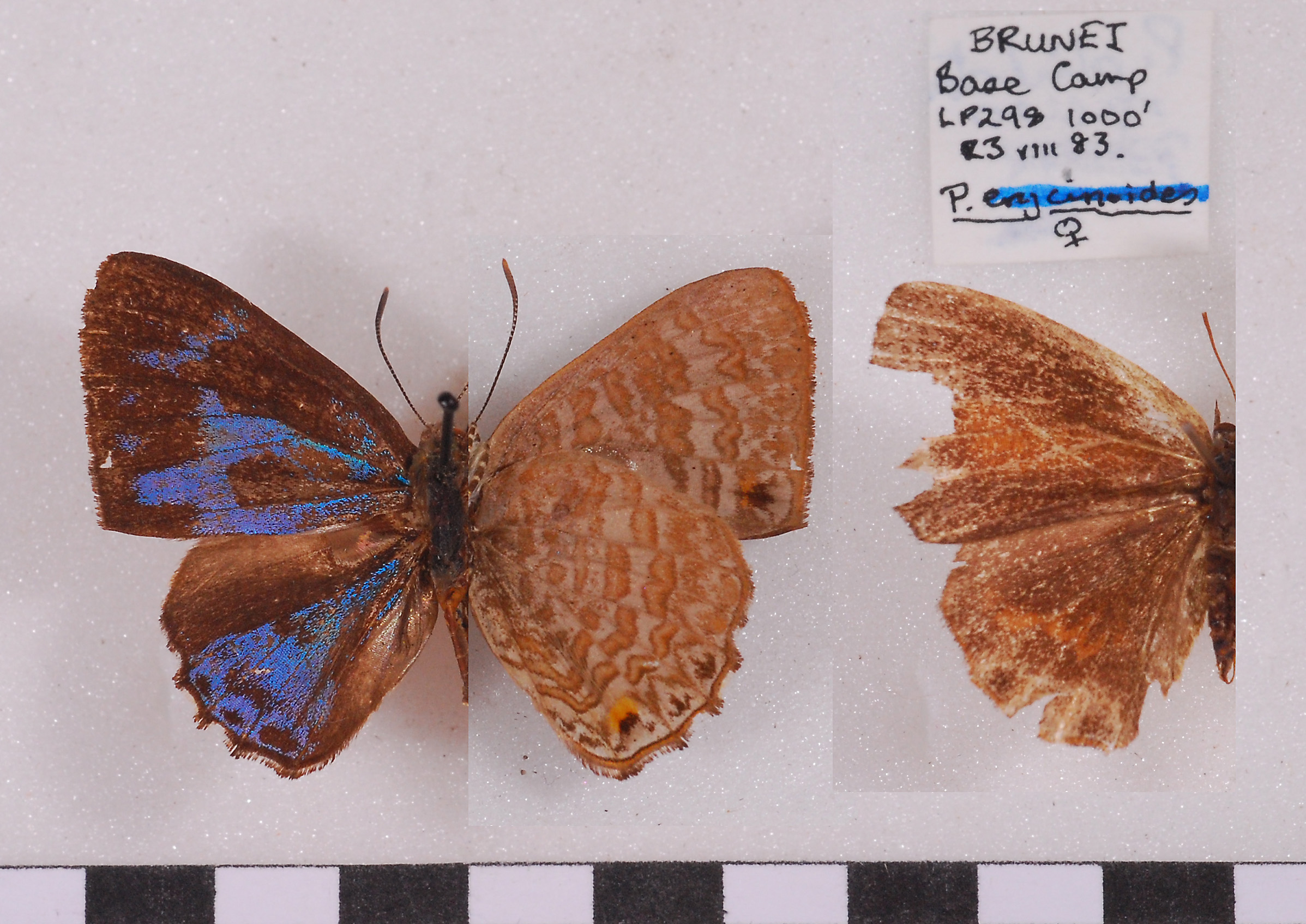

Scientific classification
- Kingdom: Animalia
- Phylum: Arthropoda
- Class: Insecta
- Order: Lepidoptera
- Family: Lycaenidae
- Genus: Poritia
- Species: P. philota

Binomial name
- Poritia philota Hewitson, 1874

Synonyms
- Poritia philota nicias Fruhstorfer, 1917; Poritia philota philota f. penumbrata Morrell, 1957; Poritia philota philota ♀-f. lugubris Eliot, 1957; Poritia philota philota ♀-f. ornata Eliot, 1957; Poritia phare Druce, 1895; Poritia philota sugimotoi Hayashi, 1978; Poritina m.f. talophi Hayashi, Schröder & Treadaway, 1984

= Poritia philota =

Species of butterfly

Poritia philota is a butterfly in the family Lycaenidae. It was described by William Chapman Hewitson in 1874. It is found in the Indomalayan realm.Above the males are very similar to some forms of erycinoides, but whereas the latter have an under surface traversed by light undulate arcuate stripes, the male of philota is dark brown, traversed by still darker arcuate transverse lines.

== Subspecies ==
- Poritia philota philota (southern Myanmar, Thailand to Peninsular Malaysia, Singapore, Sumatra, Borneo)
- Poritia philota phare Druce, 1895 (Philippines)
- Poritia philota taimana Fruhstorfer, 1917 (Taiwan)
- Poritia philota glennuydai Schröder & Treadaway, 1989 (Philippines: Luzon)
- Poritia philota mindora Osada, 1994 (Philippines: Mindoro)
- Poritia philota simoncolini H. Hayashi & N. Mohagan, 2017
