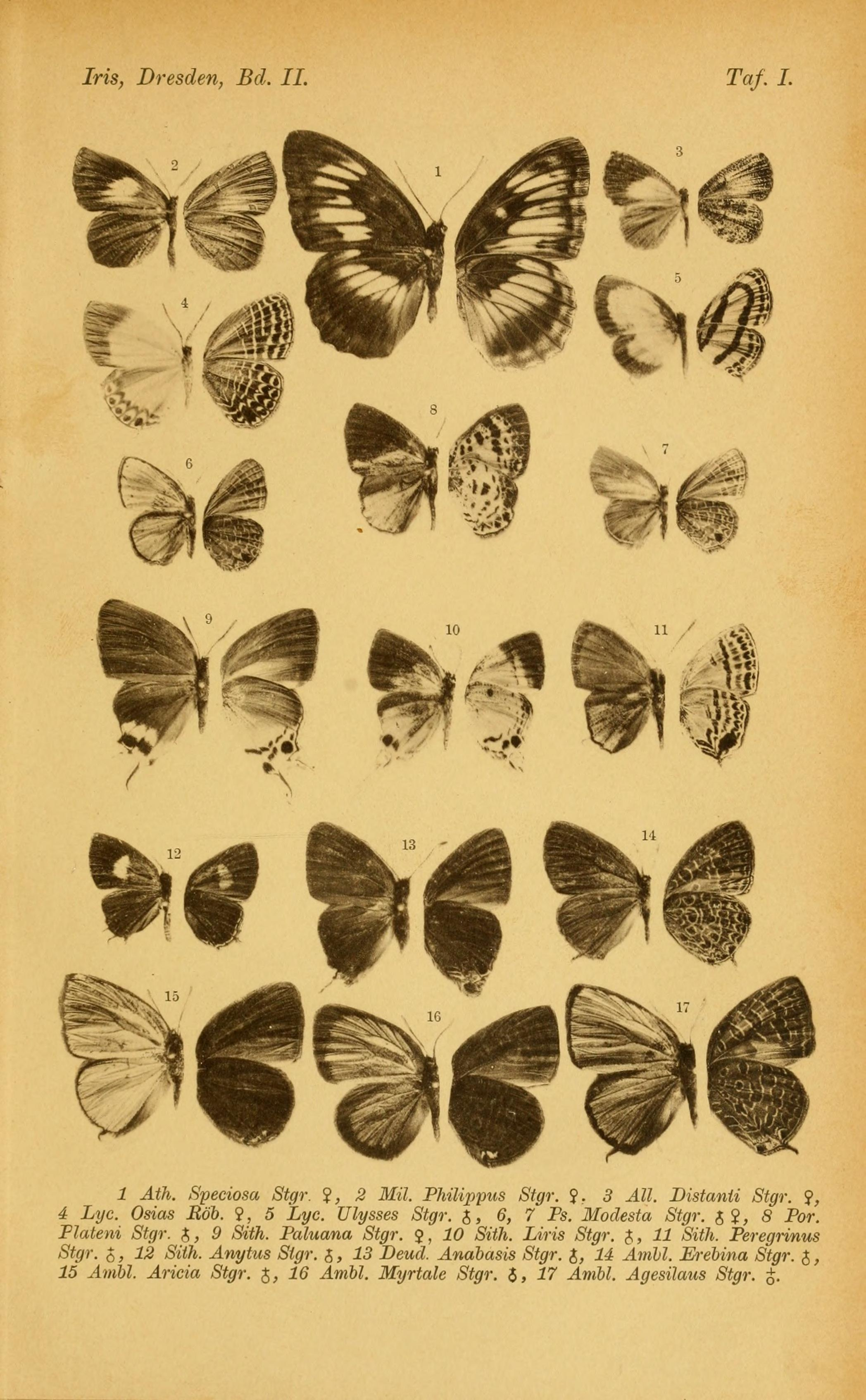
- Plate accompanying the original description

Scientific classification
- Kingdom: Animalia
- Phylum: Arthropoda
- Class: Insecta
- Order: Lepidoptera
- Family: Lycaenidae
- Genus: Poritia
- Species: P. plateni

Binomial name
- Poritia plateni Staudinger, 1889

= Poritia plateni =

Species of butterfly

Poritia plateni is an Indomalayan butterfly found on Sumatra, Borneo, Peninsular Thailand and in the Philippines that belongs to the lycaenids or blues family. Above the male is somewhat like sumatrae (154 h), but beneath both wings are white with a rusty-red distal margin and all over covered with black dots
