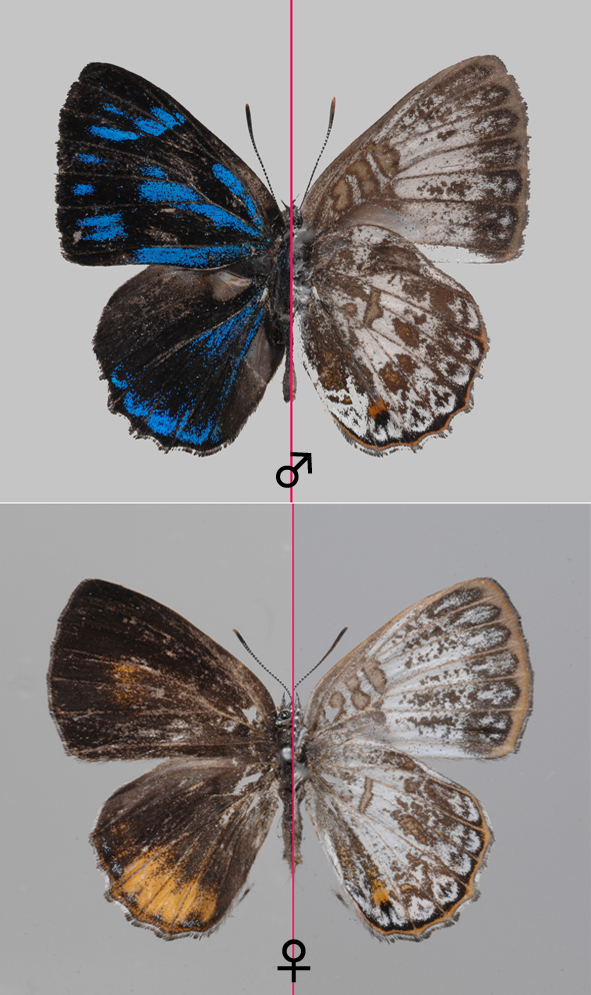
- Upperside & underside of male & female

Scientific classification
- Domain: Eukaryota
- Kingdom: Animalia
- Phylum: Arthropoda
- Class: Insecta
- Order: Lepidoptera
- Family: Lycaenidae
- Genus: Poritia
- Species: P. philota
- Subspecies: P. p. simoncolini

Trinomial name
- Poritia philota simoncolini H. Hayashi & N. Mohagan, 2017

= Poritia philota simoncolini =

Subspecies of butterfly

Poritia philota simoncolini is a butterfly of the family Lycaenidae. This subspecies of Poritia philota was first described by Hisakazu Hayashi and Noel Mohagan in 2017. It is found only on Mt. Baco of Mindoro island in the Philippines. Its forewing length is 14–17 mm. It is distinguishable from the subspecies P. p. mindora from Mt. Halcon on Mindoro Island by the markings of the upperside and underside.
