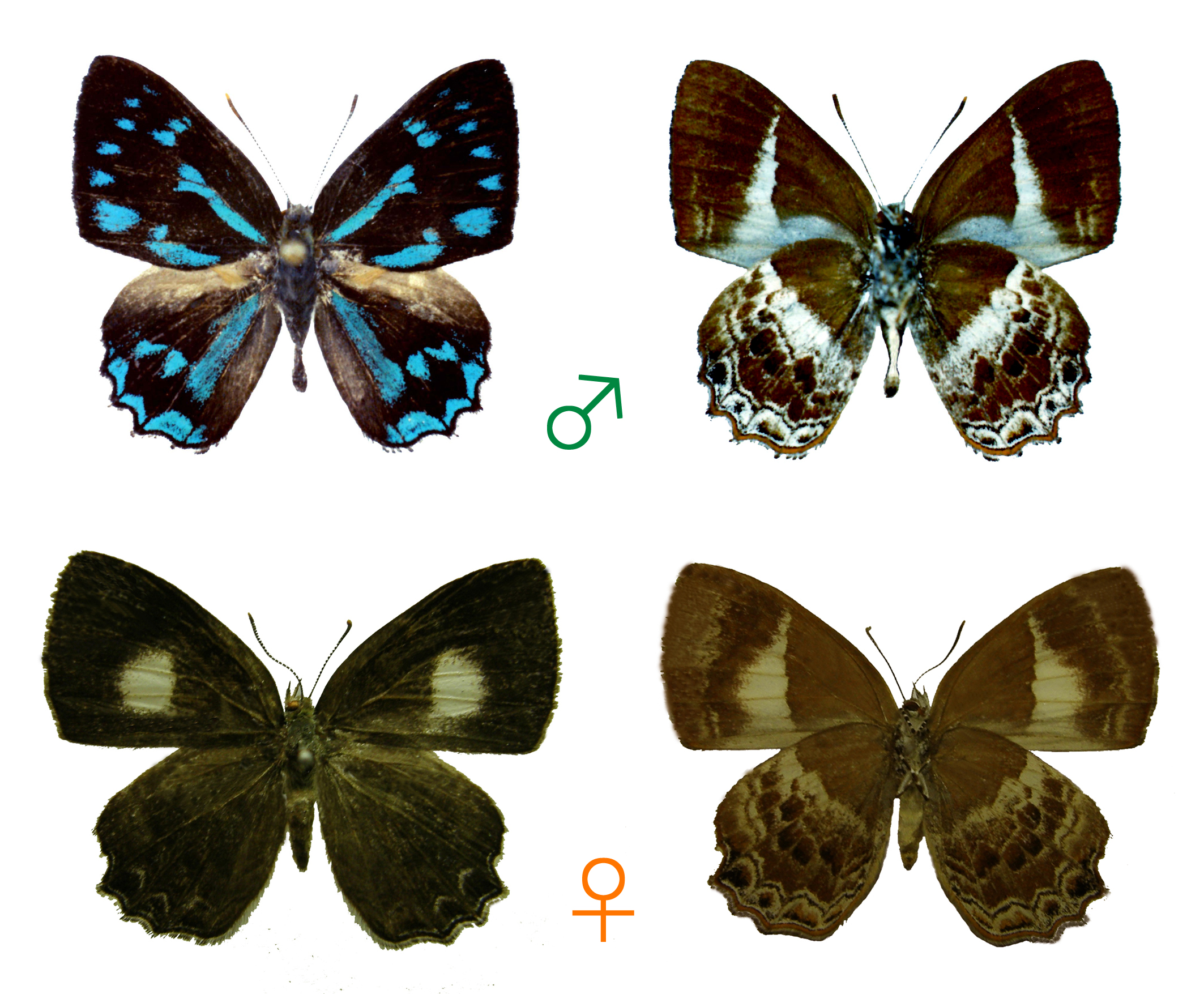
- Male (top) and female

Scientific classification
- Kingdom: Animalia
- Phylum: Arthropoda
- Clade: Pancrustacea
- Class: Insecta
- Order: Lepidoptera
- Family: Lycaenidae
- Genus: Poritia
- Species: P. phalena
- Subspecies: P. p. hayashii

Trinomial name
- Poritia phalena hayashii (Schröder & Treadaway, 1979)

Synonyms
- Simiskina hayashii Schröder & Treadaway, 1979

= Poritia phalena hayashii =

Subspecies of butterfly

Poritia phalena hayashii is a subspecies of butterfly in the family Lycaenidae. It is found in the Philippines (Bohol, Leyte and Mindanao). The subspecies was first described by Heinz G. Schröder and Colin G. Treadaway in 1979.
