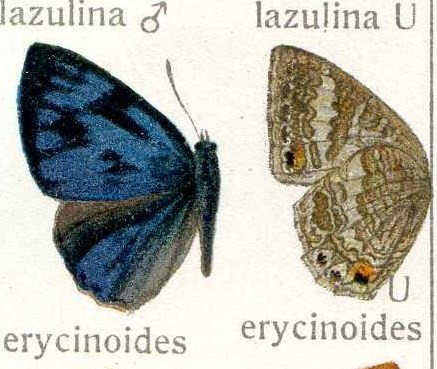
- Upperside left, underside right, from Seitz
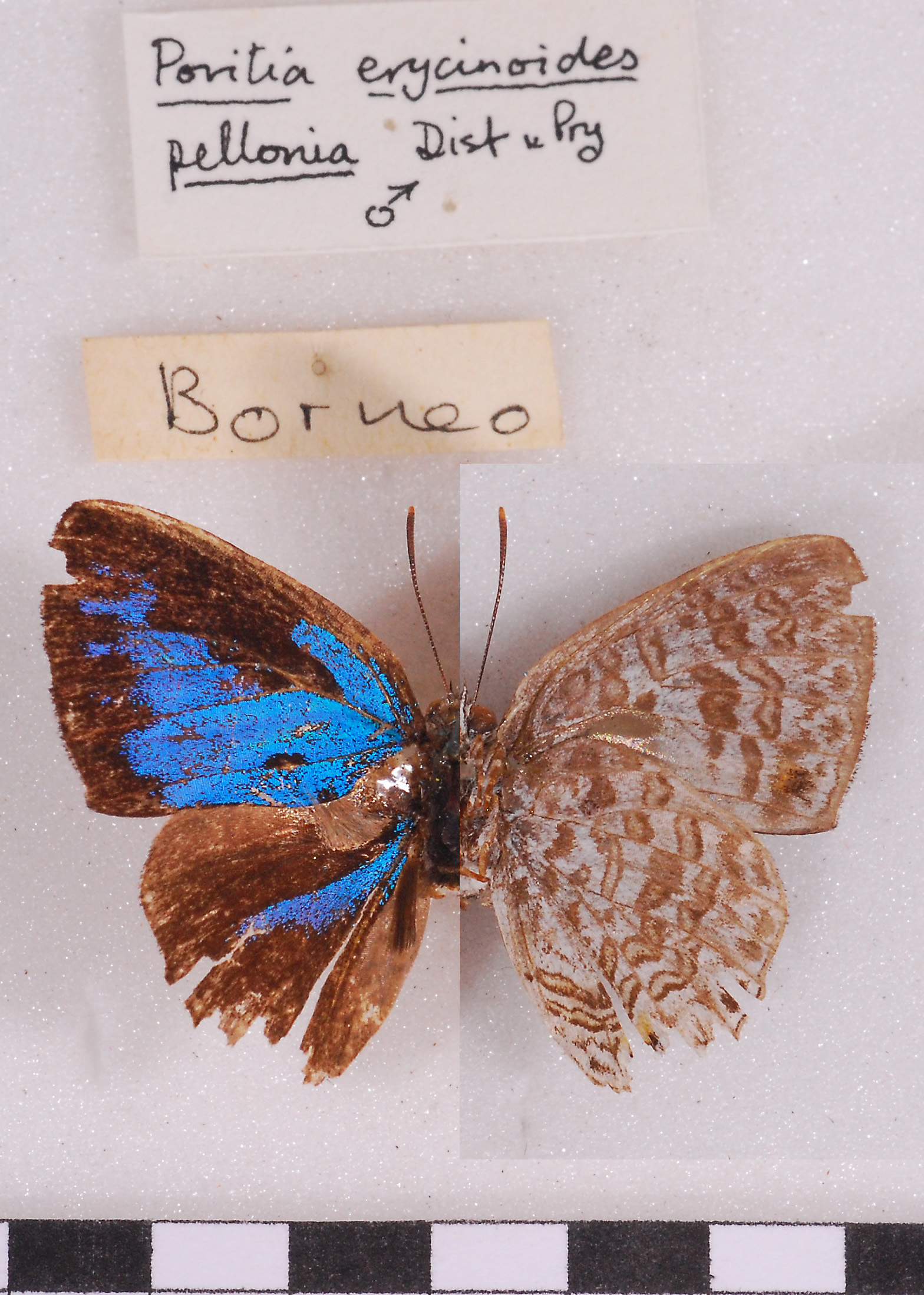

Scientific classification
- Domain: Eukaryota
- Kingdom: Animalia
- Phylum: Arthropoda
- Class: Insecta
- Order: Lepidoptera
- Family: Lycaenidae
- Genus: Poritia
- Species: P. erycinoides

Binomial name
- Poritia erycinoides (C. Felder, 1865)

= Poritia erycinoides =

Species of butterfly

Poritia erycinoides, the blue gem, is a small butterfly found in India, Myanmar and parts of South-East Asia that belongs to the lycaenids or blues family.

== Range ==
It ranges along the Himalayas from Assam in India to northern Myanmar and south to the Shan States and southern Myanmar. As per Savela, the butterfly ranges from Assam, Burma, Malaya, Langkawi, Tioman Islands, Borneo, Java and Thailand.

== Status ==
Not rare as per William Harry Evans. Rare as per Mark Alexander Wynter-Blyth.

== Description ==
A small butterfly, 26 to 36 mm in wingspan. The basal half or more of the cell in upper forewing is blue, with blue spots present in the apex and termen. Females: The upper forewing has a yellow discal patch above the blue area. The upper hindwing blue area is small and reduced to discal quadrate spots in 3 and 4. The females resemble those of the common gem (P. hewitsoni) but with yellow spots on the upper hindwing. The males of the blue gem are bluer than the common gem which is greener.

== Taxonomy ==
Five subspecies of the butterfly have been described:-

- Poritia erycinoides erycinoides C. Felder, 1865 Java
- Poritia erycinoides elsiei Evans, 1925 Assam, northern Myanmar, Burma, northern Thailand
- Poritia erycinoides phraatica Hewitson, 1878 southern Shan States – southern Myanmar, Thailand, Peninsular Malaya, Langkawi, Tioman Islands
- Poritia erycinoides trishna Fruhstorfer, 1919 Assam, ?Nepal, ?Sikkim
- Poritia erycinoides phaluke Druce, 1895 Borneo

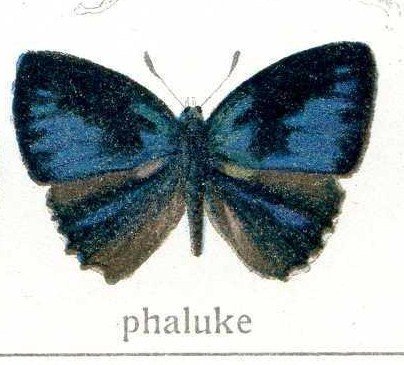
P. e. phaluke
