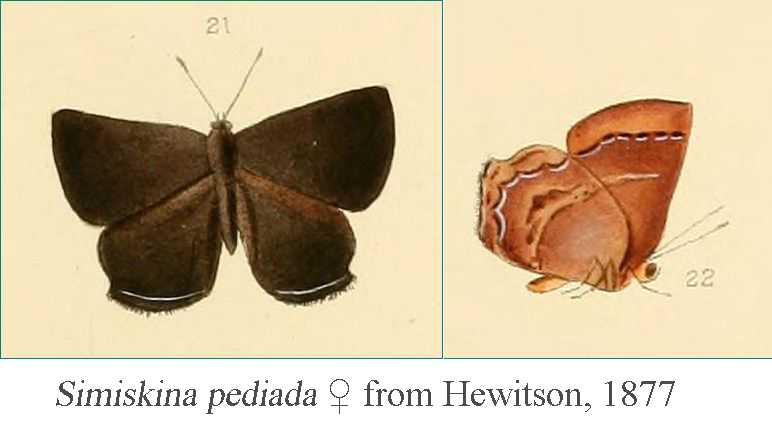

Scientific classification
- Domain: Eukaryota
- Kingdom: Animalia
- Phylum: Arthropoda
- Class: Insecta
- Order: Lepidoptera
- Family: Lycaenidae
- Genus: Simiskina
- Species: S. pediada

Binomial name
- Simiskina pediada (Hewitson, 1877)

Synonyms
- Poritia pediada Hewitson, 1877

= Simiskina pediada =

Species of butterfly

Simiskina pediada is a butterfly in the family Lycaenidae. It is found from southern Burma to Indochina, Peninsular Malaysia and Singapore.
