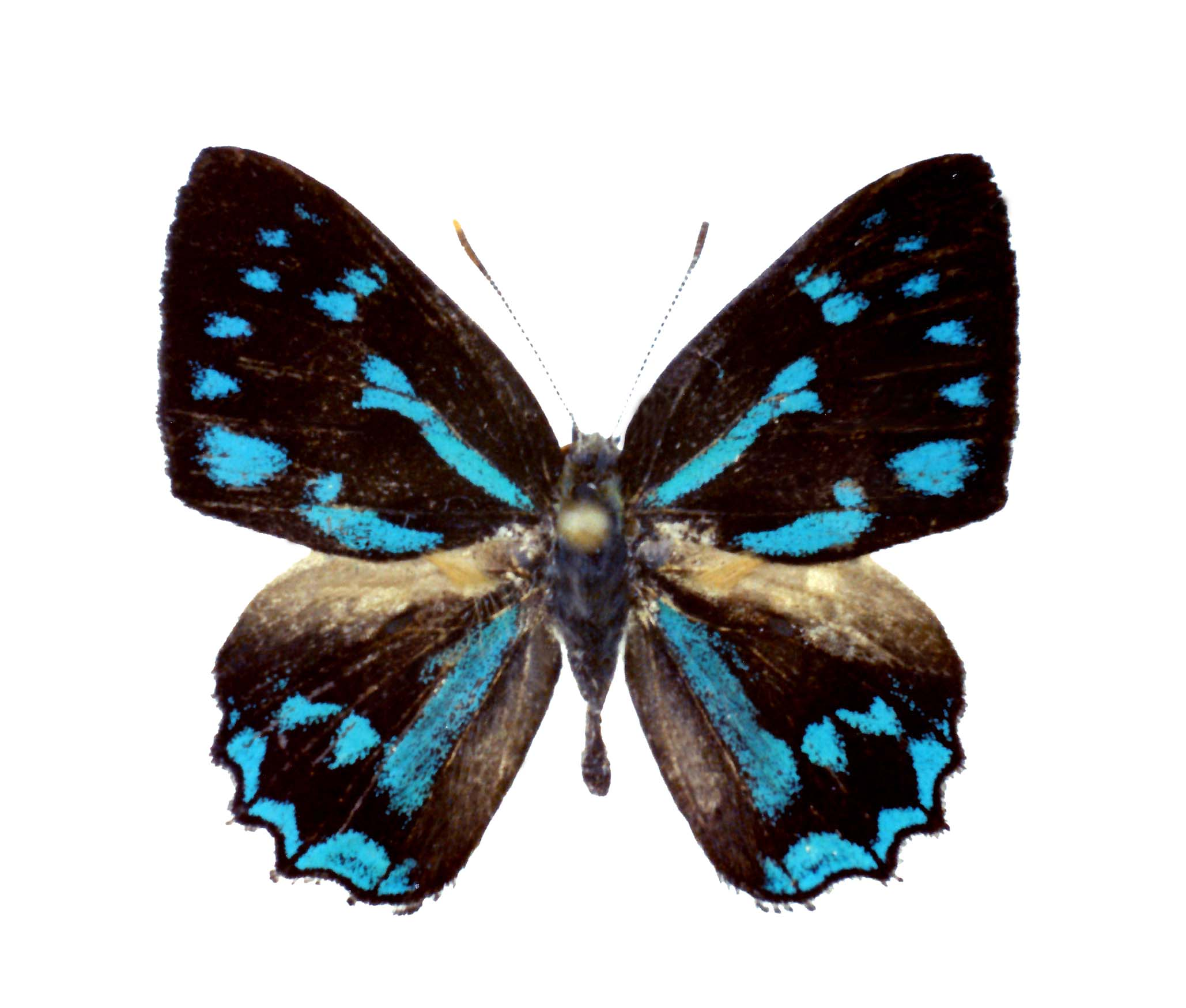
- Simiskina phalena hayashii

Scientific classification
- Domain: Eukaryota
- Kingdom: Animalia
- Phylum: Arthropoda
- Class: Insecta
- Order: Lepidoptera
- Family: Lycaenidae
- Tribe: Poritiini
- Genus: Simiskina; Distant, 1886

Synonyms
- Massaga Doherty, 1889 (preocc. Walker, 1854)

= Simiskina =

Butterfly genus in family Lycaenidae

Simiskina is a genus of butterflies in the family Lycaenidae. The genus was erected by William Lucas Distant in 1886. The species of this genus are found in the Indomalayan realm.

== Species ==
- Simiskina pasira (Moulton, 1911)
- Simiskina pavonica de Nicéville, 1895
- Simiskina pediada (Hewitson, 1877)
- Simiskina phalena (Hewitson, 1874)
- Simiskina phalia (Hewitson, 1874)
- Simiskina pharyge (Hewitson, 1874)
- Simiskina pheretia (Hewitson, 1874)
- Simiskina philura (H. H. Druce, 1895)
- Simiskina proxima de Nicéville, 1895
- Simiskina sibatika Eliot, 1969
