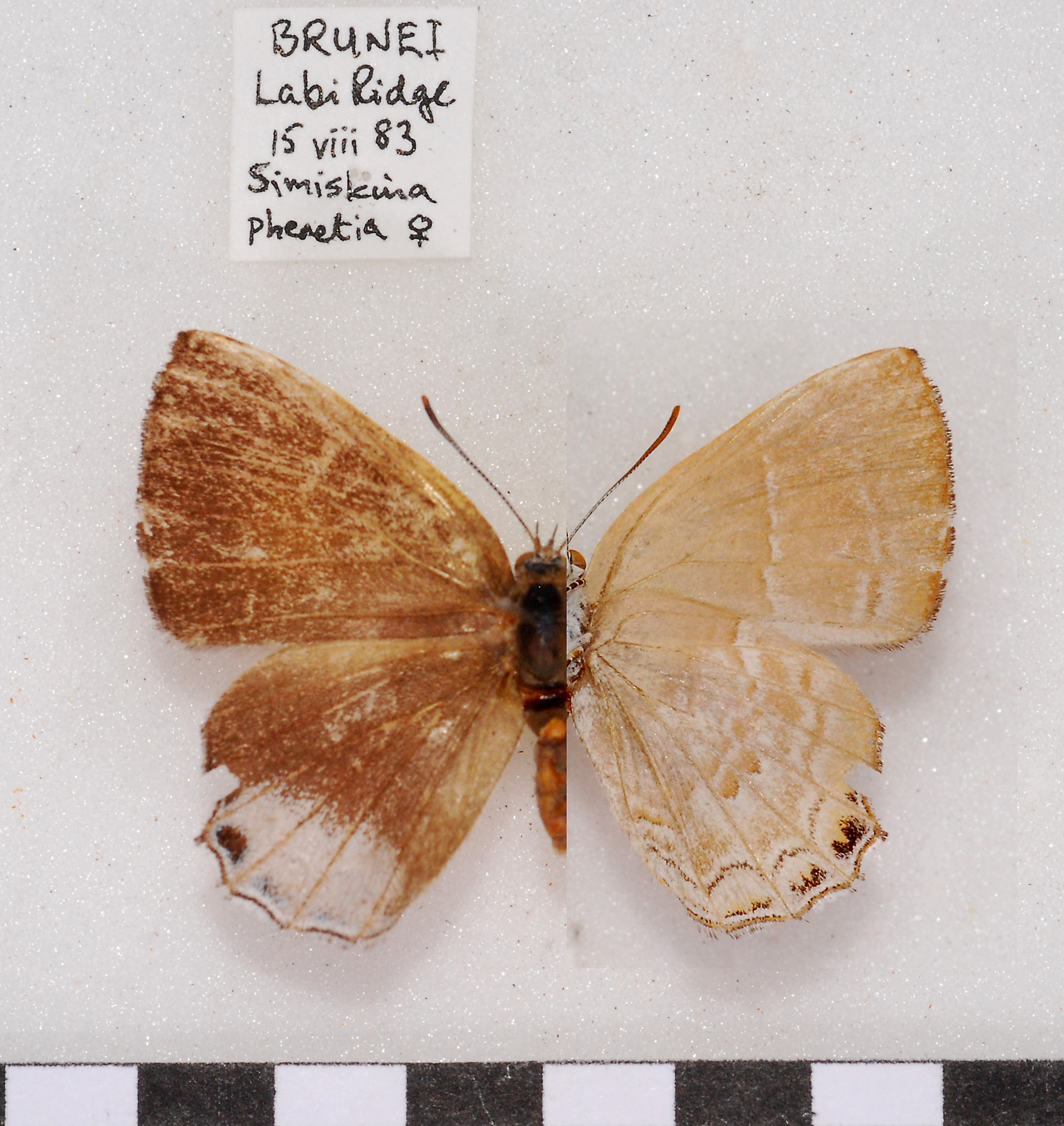

Scientific classification
- Kingdom: Animalia
- Phylum: Arthropoda
- Class: Insecta
- Order: Lepidoptera
- Family: Lycaenidae
- Genus: Simiskina
- Species: S. pheretia

Binomial name
- Simiskina pheretia (Hewitson, 1874)

Synonyms
- Poritia pheretia Hewitson, 1874; Poritia pheretia maina Fruhstorfer, 1917; Poritia (Simiskina) pheretia bilitis Fruhstorfer, 1919

= Simiskina pheretia =

Species of butterfly

Simiskina pheretia is a butterfly in the family Lycaenidae. It was described by William Chapman Hewitson in 1874. It is found in the Indomalayan realm.

== Subspecies ==
- Simiskina pheretia pheretia (Peninsular Malaysia, Borneo, possibly Singapore)
- Simiskina pheretia maina (Fruhstorfer, 1917) (northern Borneo)
- Simiskina pheretia bilitis (Fruhstorfer, 1919) (north-eastern Sumatra)
