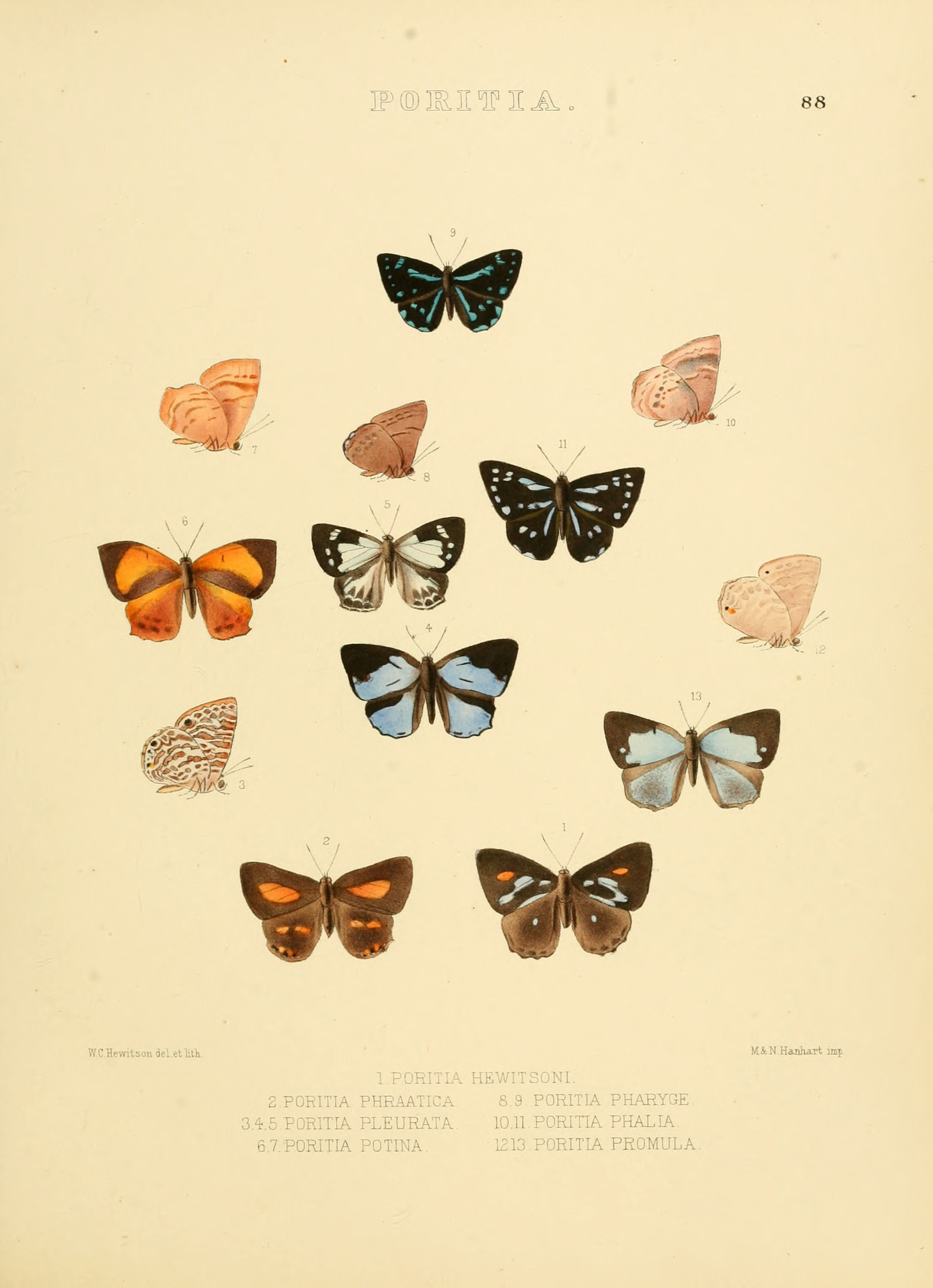
- From William Chapman Hewitson's Illustrations of Diurnal Lepidoptera, figures 3 and 4 are male and 5 is female.

Scientific classification
- Kingdom: Animalia
- Phylum: Arthropoda
- Class: Insecta
- Order: Lepidoptera
- Family: Lycaenidae
- Genus: Poritia
- Species: P. pleurata

Binomial name
- Poritia pleurata (Hewitson, 1874)

= Poritia pleurata =

Green gem

Species of butterfly

Poritia pleurata, the green gem, is a small butterfly found in India, Myanmar and South Asia that belongs to the lycaenids or blues family.

== Range ==
It ranges from Manipur in India to Myanmar. As per Savela it is found in Manipur, Burma, Sumatra, Peninsular Malaya and Langkawi Islands.

== Status ==
Rare as per Wynter-Blyth.

== Description ==
It is a small butterfly with a 30 to 40 mm wingspan. The basal half or more of the cell in upper forewing is blue. There are apical and terminal spots in 2 and 3, though these may be absent in the dry-season form. The upper forewing of the females do not have a yellow patch.

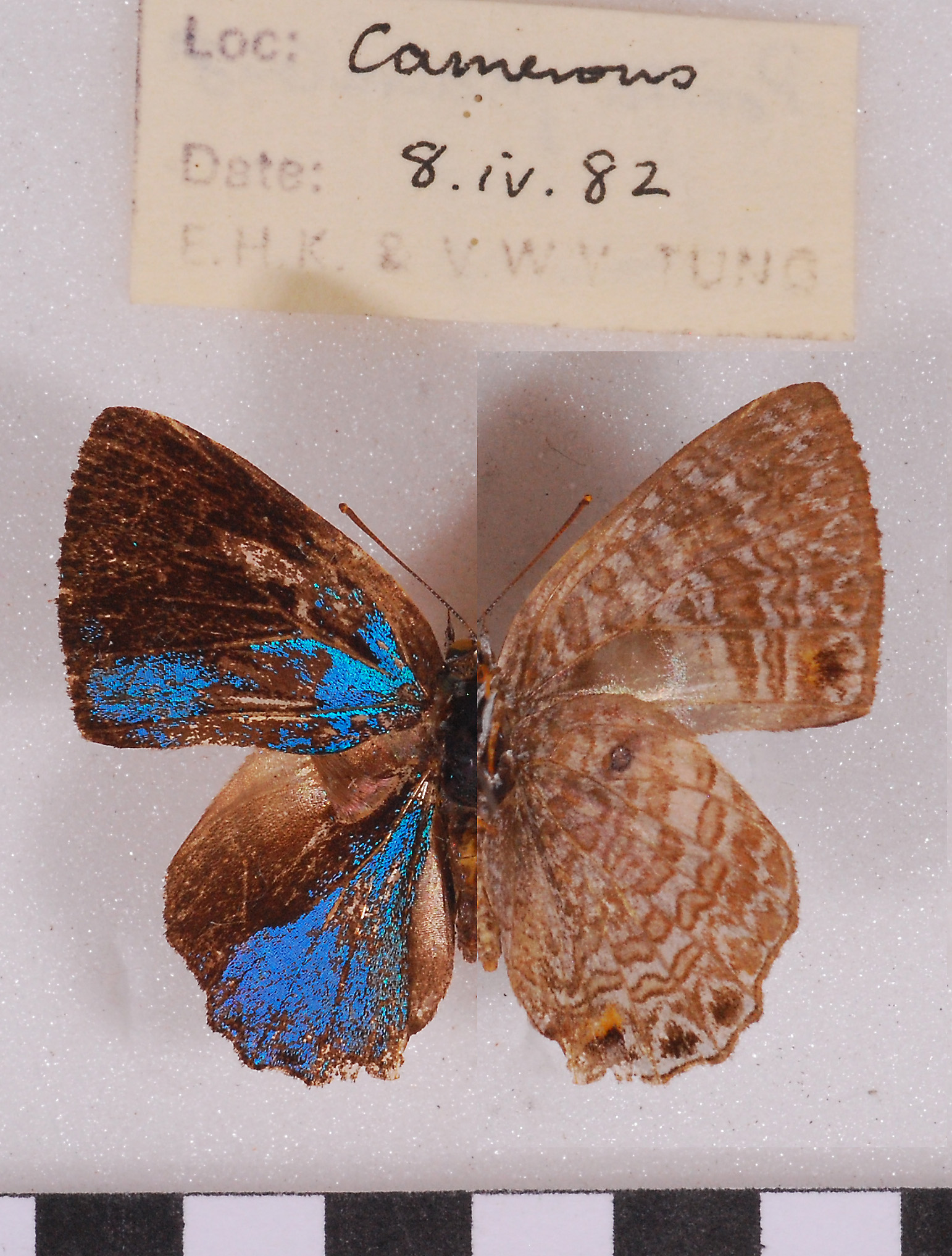

== See also ==
- List of butterflies of India
- List of butterflies of India (Lycaenidae)
