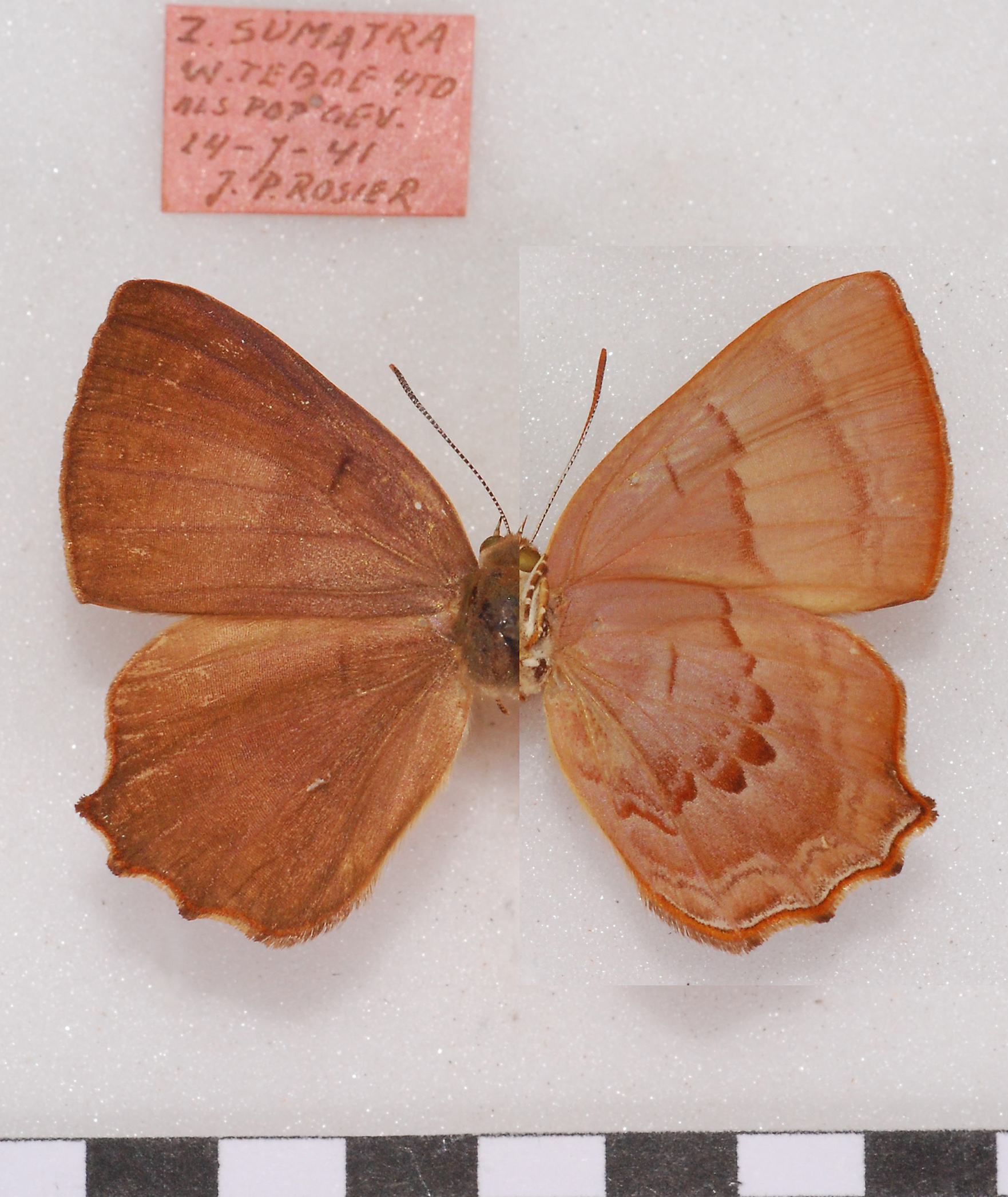

Scientific classification
- Kingdom: Animalia
- Phylum: Arthropoda
- Class: Insecta
- Order: Lepidoptera
- Family: Lycaenidae
- Genus: Simiskina
- Species: S. pasira

Binomial name
- Simiskina pasira (Moulton, 1912)

Synonyms
- Poritia pasira Moulton, 1912; Poritia pediada semperi Fruhstorfer, 1919

= Simiskina pasira =

Species of butterfly

Simiskina pasira is a butterfly in the family Lycaenidae. It is found in southern Burma, Thailand and on Peninsular Malaysia, Langkawi, Mindanao and Borneo.

== Subspecies ==
- Simiskina pasira pasira
- Simiskina pasira semperi (Fruhstorfer 1919) (Philippines: Mindanao)
