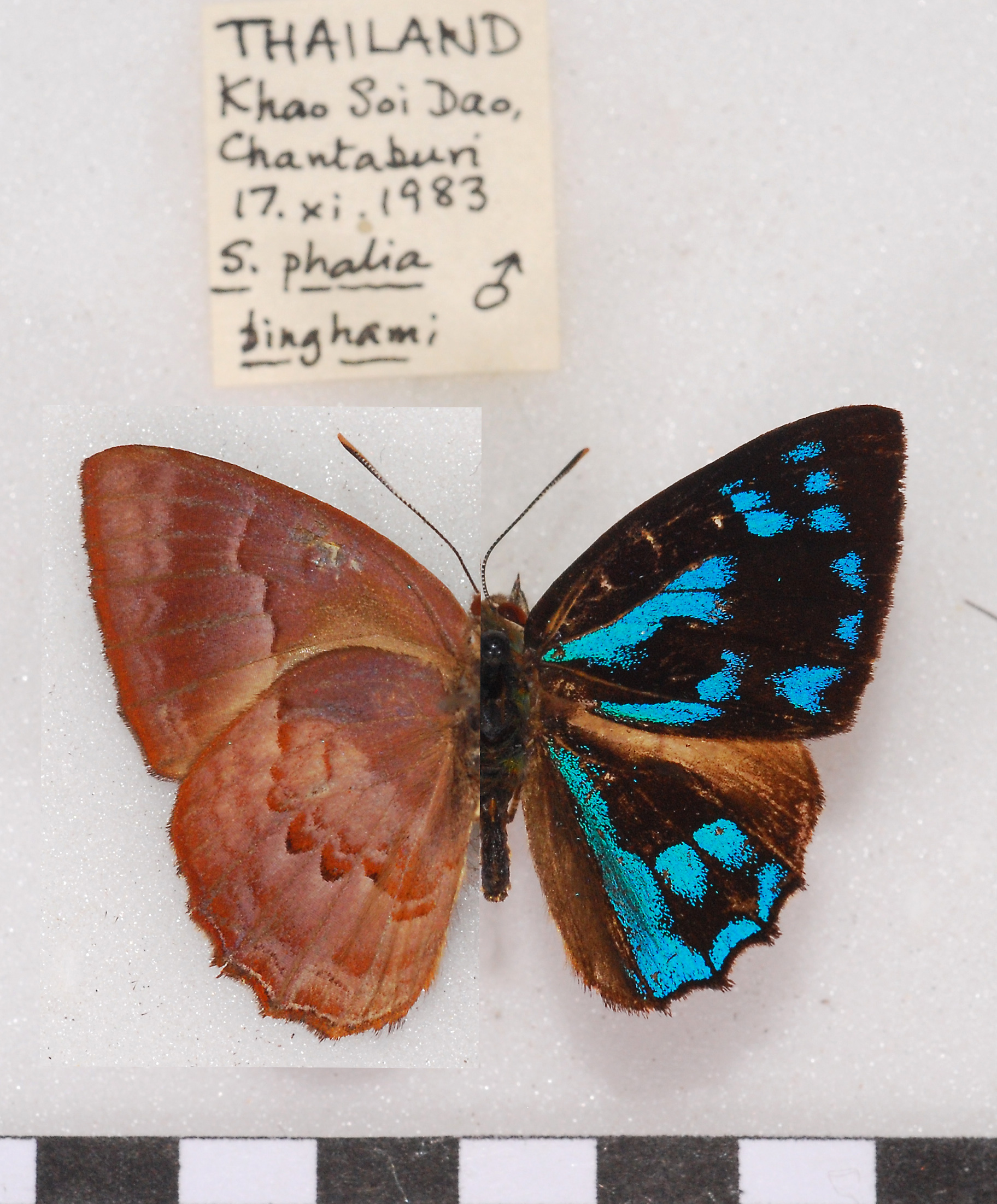
- Simiskina phalia binghami

Scientific classification
- Kingdom: Animalia
- Phylum: Arthropoda
- Clade: Pancrustacea
- Class: Insecta
- Order: Lepidoptera
- Family: Lycaenidae
- Genus: Simiskina
- Species: S. phalia

Binomial name
- Simiskina phalia (Hewitson, 1874)

Synonyms
- Poritia phalia Hewitson, 1874; Simiskina fulgens Distant, 1886; Poritia potina Hewitson, 1874; Poritia phalia binghami Fruhstorfer, 1912

= Simiskina phalia =

Species of butterfly

Simiskina phalia is a butterfly in the family Lycaenidae. It was described by William Chapman Hewitson in 1874. It is found in the Indomalayan realm.

== Subspecies ==
- Simiskina phalia phalia (Borneo, Sumatra)
- Simiskina phalia potina (Hewitson, 1874) (southern Burma, Thailand to Peninsular Malaysia, Singapore)
- Simiskina phalia morishitai Hayashi, 1976 Palawan
