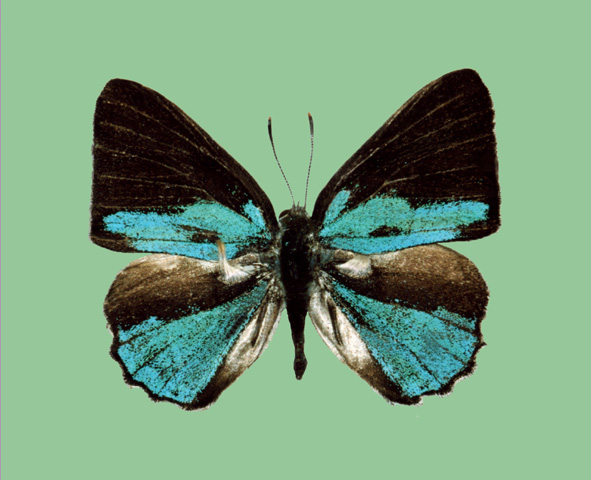
- Male upperside
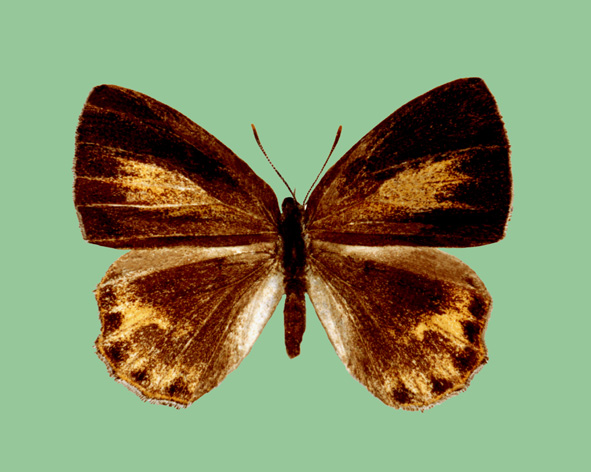
- Female upperside

Scientific classification
- Kingdom: Animalia
- Phylum: Arthropoda
- Clade: Pancrustacea
- Class: Insecta
- Order: Lepidoptera
- Family: Lycaenidae
- Genus: Poritia
- Species: P. kinoshitai

Binomial name
- Poritia kinoshitai (H. Hayashi, 1976)

Synonyms
- Poritia erycinoides kinoshitai H. Hayashi, 1976 was changed the status to Poritia kinoshitai by Takanami & Seki, 2001 & Treadaway & Schrőder, 2012.

= Poritia kinoshitai =

Species of butterfly

Poritia kinoshitai is a butterfly of the family Lycaenidae first described by Hisakazu Hayashi in 1976. Its forewing length is 14–15 mm. It is a rare species and endemic to Palawan island in the Philippines.

Etymology. The specific name is dedicated to Dr. Kazuo KINOSHITA, Professor Emeritus of Osaka University in Japan.
