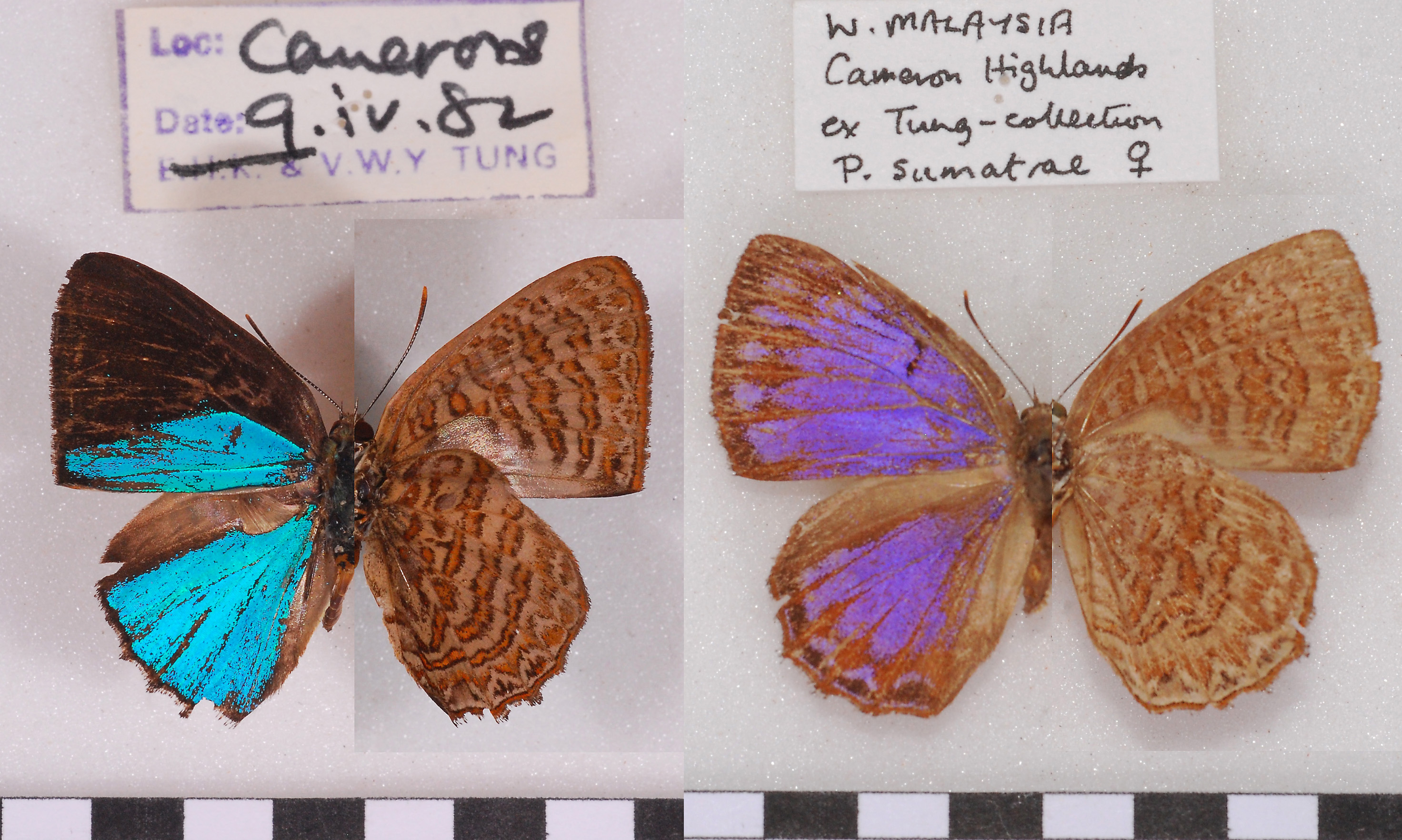

Scientific classification
- Kingdom: Animalia
- Phylum: Arthropoda
- Class: Insecta
- Order: Lepidoptera
- Family: Lycaenidae
- Genus: Poritia
- Species: P. sumatrae

Binomial name
- Poritia sumatrae (C. Felder & R. Felder, 1865)

Synonyms
- Pseudodipsas sumatrae C. & R. Felder, 1865

= Poritia sumatrae =

Species of butterfly

Poritia sumatrae is a butterfly in the family Lycaenidae. It was described by Cajetan Felder and Rudolf Felder in 1865. It is found in the Indomalayan realm.

In English, the species goes by the common names Dark Grass Blue or Spotted Grass-blue.

== Subspecies ==
- Poritia sumatrae sumatrae (southern Burma, Thailand to Peninsular Malaysia, Singapore, Sumatra)
- Poritia sumatrae milia Fruhstorfer, 1917 (Borneo)

== Description ==
The male is above similar to elegans, but the apical black is extended over almost two thirds of the forewing. The female exhibits those portions of the wings, that are not blue, tinted deep rust-brown. The under surface is also rusty-yellow, traversed by red-brown, somewhat undulate, narrow arcuate bands.
