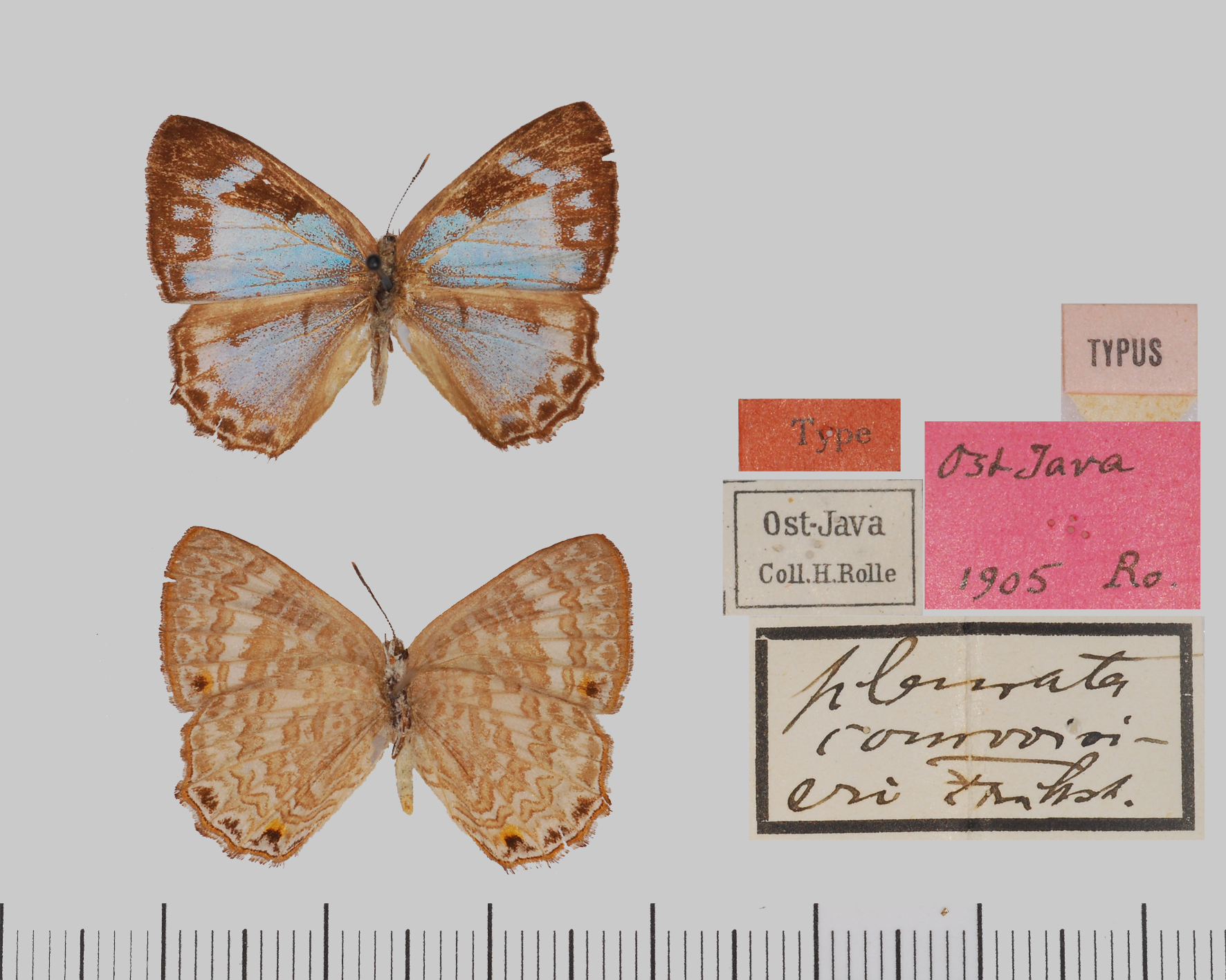
- Poritia phama courvoisieri

Scientific classification
- Kingdom: Animalia
- Phylum: Arthropoda
- Class: Insecta
- Order: Lepidoptera
- Family: Lycaenidae
- Genus: Poritia
- Species: P. phama

Binomial name
- Poritia phama H. H. Druce, 1895

= Poritia phama =

Species of butterfly

Poritia phama is a small butterfly found in the Indomalayan realm that belongs to the lycaenids or blues family. The species was first described by Hamilton Herbert Druce in 1895.

== Subspecies ==
- P. p. phama Borneo, Sumatra, Java
- P. p. geta Fawcett, 1897 Pakistan, Assam - Myanmar, Thailand
- P. p. courvoisieri Fruhstorfer, 1917 East Java
- P. p. regia Evans, 1921 Langkawi Island, South Thailand
- P. p. rajata Corbet, 1940
- P. p. palawana Osada, 1994 Philippines, Palawan, Olanguan
