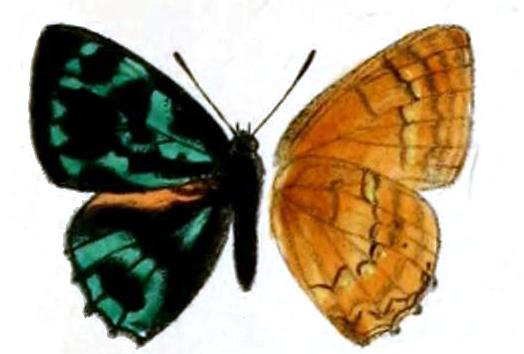

Scientific classification
- Domain: Eukaryota
- Kingdom: Animalia
- Phylum: Arthropoda
- Class: Insecta
- Order: Lepidoptera
- Family: Lycaenidae
- Genus: Simiskina
- Species: S. philura

Binomial name
- Simiskina philura (H. H. Druce, 1895)

Synonyms
- Poritia philura H. H. Druce, 1895

= Simiskina philura =

Species of butterfly

Simiskina philura is a butterfly in the family Lycaenidae first described by Hamilton Herbert Druce in 1895. It is found on Peninsular Malaysia and Borneo.

== Subspecies ==
- Simiskina philura philura (Borneo)
- Simiskina philura elioti Corbet, 1940 (western Malaysia)
