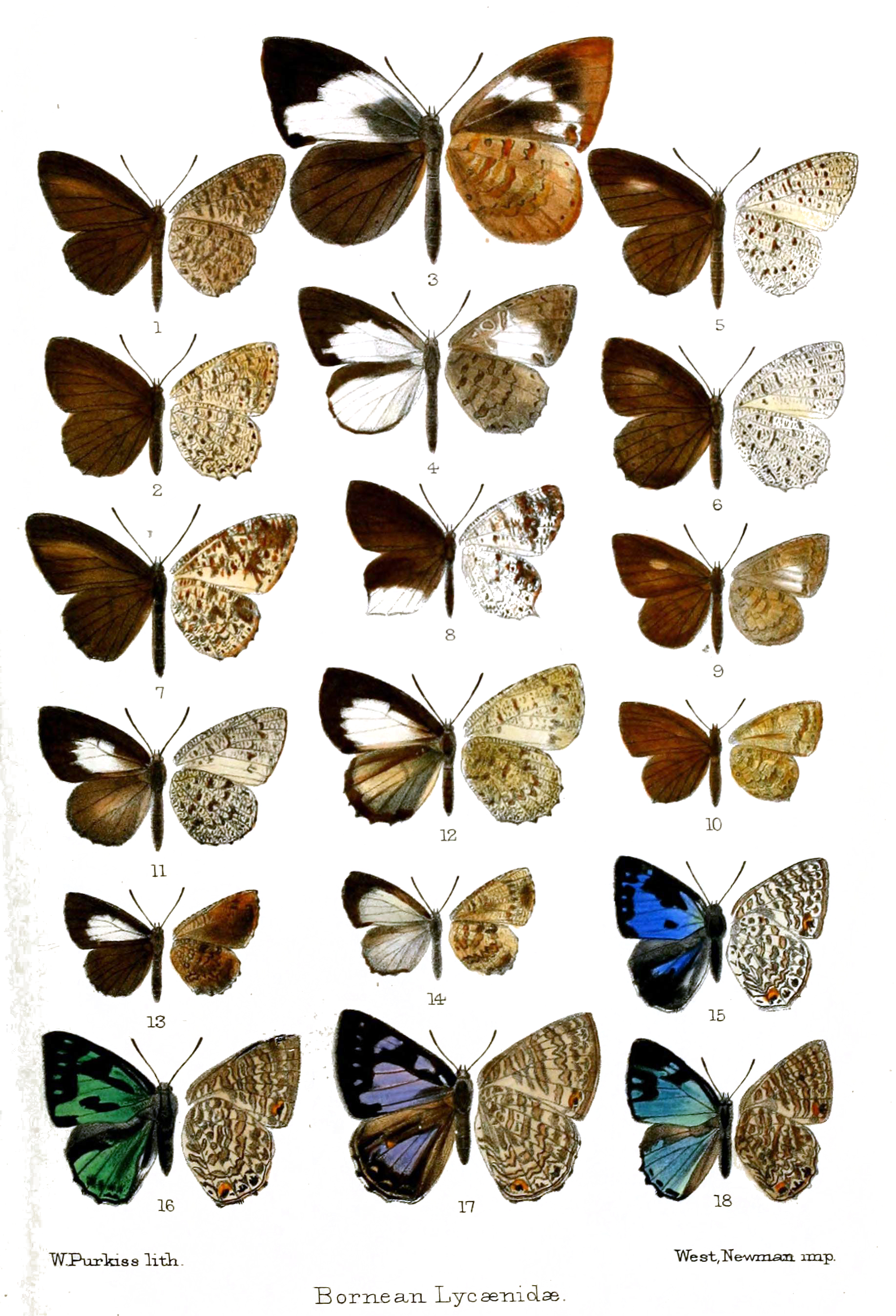
- Plate accompanying the original description

Scientific classification
- Kingdom: Animalia
- Phylum: Arthropoda
- Clade: Pancrustacea
- Class: Insecta
- Order: Lepidoptera
- Family: Lycaenidae
- Genus: Poritia
- Species: P. phormedon

Binomial name
- Poritia phormedon H. H. Druce, 1895

= Poritia phormedon =

Species of butterfly

Poritia phormedon is an Indomalayan butterfly endemic to Borneo that belongs to the lycaenids, the blues family. Poritia phormedon was described by Hamilton Herbert Druce in 1895. Hans Fruhstorfer in Seitz ( page 1008 plate 34 fig.i) provides a description differentiating phormedon from neighbouring taxa.
