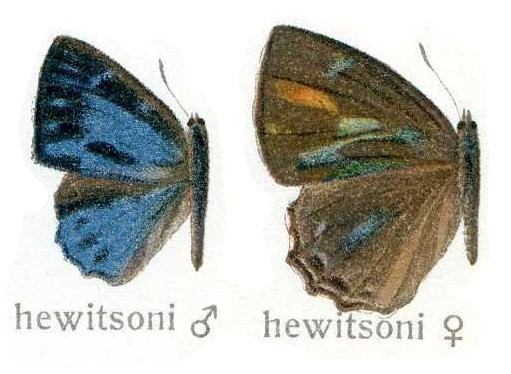
- Male left, female right
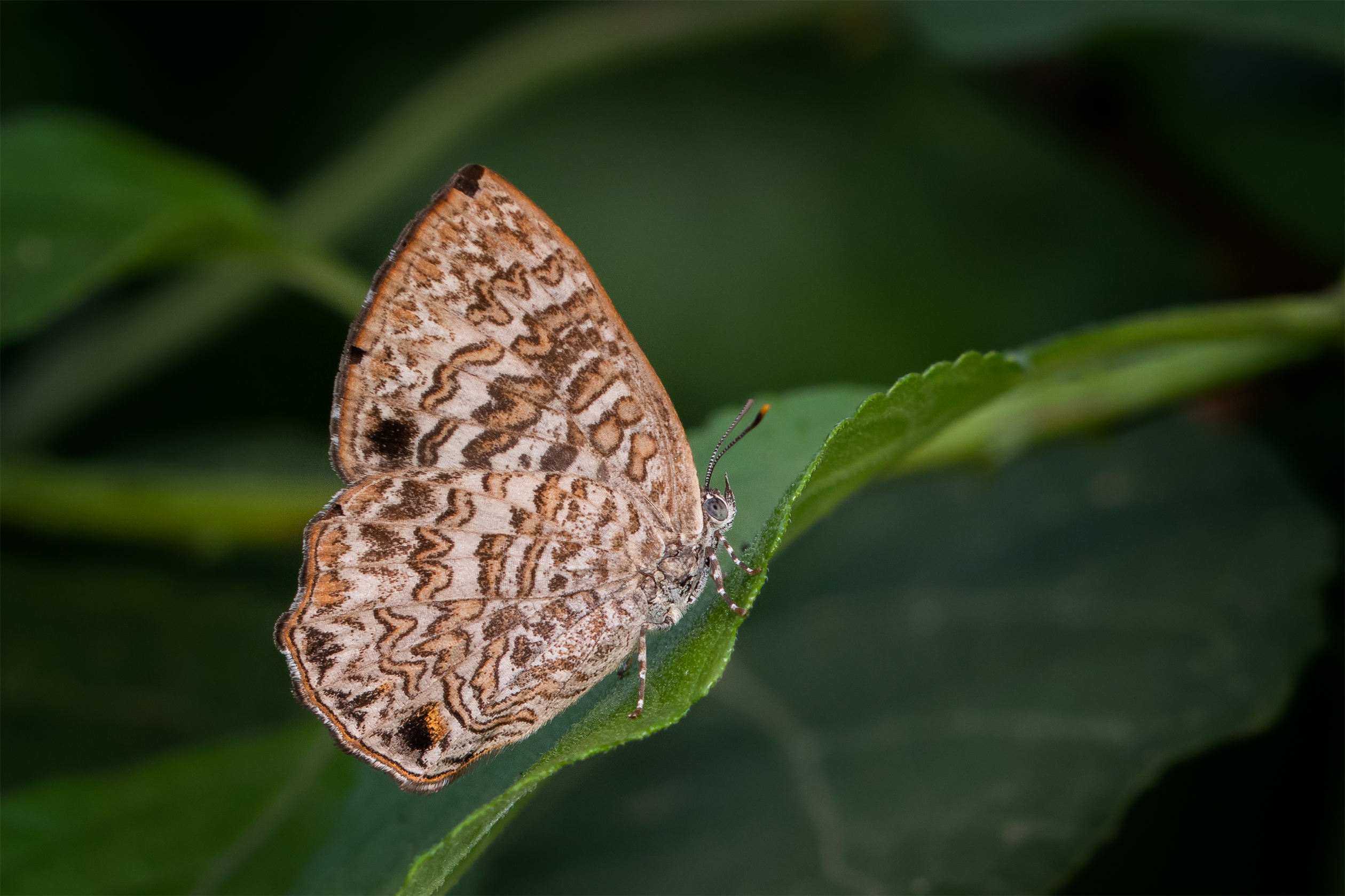

Scientific classification
- Domain: Eukaryota
- Kingdom: Animalia
- Phylum: Arthropoda
- Class: Insecta
- Order: Lepidoptera
- Family: Lycaenidae
- Genus: Poritia
- Species: P. hewitsoni

Binomial name
- Poritia hewitsoni (Moore, 1865)

= Poritia hewitsoni =

Common gem

Species of butterfly

Poritia hewitsoni, the common gem, is a small butterfly found in India, Myanmar, Thailand, Malaysia and Vietnam that belongs to the lycaenids or blues family.

== Range ==
It ranges along the Himalayas from Kumaon to Assam in India and onto Myanmar. Recorded from Mangan and Rangpo in Sikkim.

== Description ==
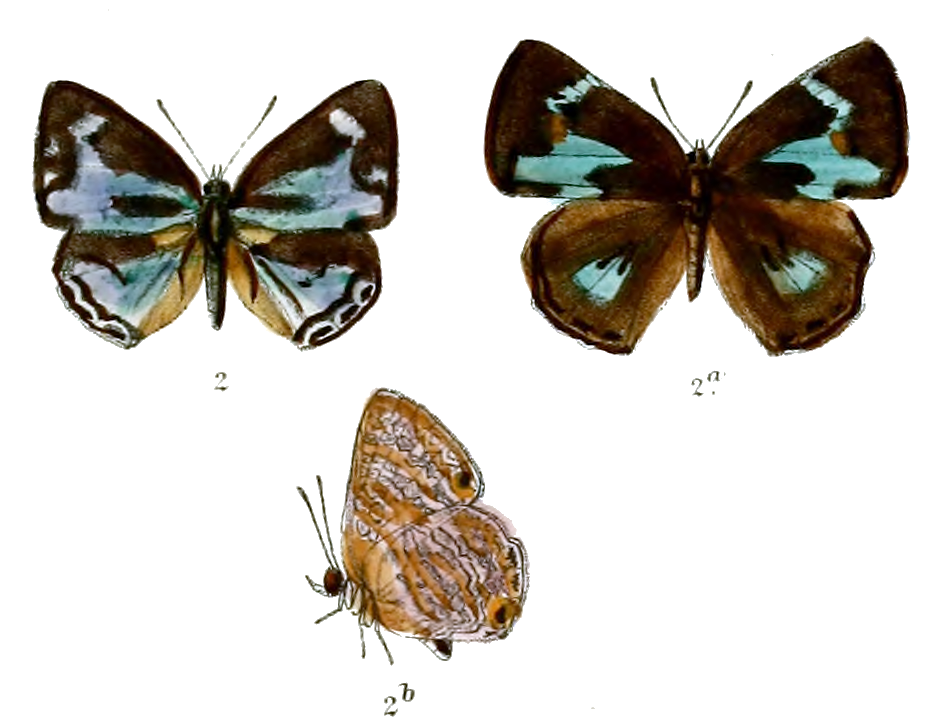

It is a small butterfly with a 31 to 38 mm wingspan. Male upper: dark iridescent blue, usually with submarginal and apical spots. The cell on upperside forewing is entirely devoid of blue or with a minute blue spot at the base in some cases. Males also have a tufted brand on the upper hindwing above vein 7. The underside is brown with variable pale lineation. Females: brown above, with a few blue spots. The upper forewing has a yellow discal patch above a blue area.

== Taxonomy ==
The butterfly has five subspecies in South Asia:-

- P. hewitsoni hewitsoni Moore, 1865 - Kumaon to Assam and not rare as per Evans, Sikkim to northern Myanmar and northern Thailand
- P. hewitsoni tavoyana Doherty 1889 - Myanmar, not rare Manipur, southern Burma, Thailand, Peninsular Malaya
- P. hewitsoni taleva Corbet, 1940 - Peninsular Malaya
- P. hewitsoni ampsaga Fruhstorfer, 1912 - Vietnam

== Habits ==
The common gem is found flying high in the lowland jungles. The males tend to fly rapidly and settle on leaves. It occurs in Sikkim in October and November. The tufted brand on the male hindwing has a discernible, distinct odour.

== Egg ==
- The egg is truncate, half as long as wide, and with two vertical and sloping and two horizontal faces.

== See also ==
- List of butterflies of India
- List of butterflies of India (Lycaenidae)
