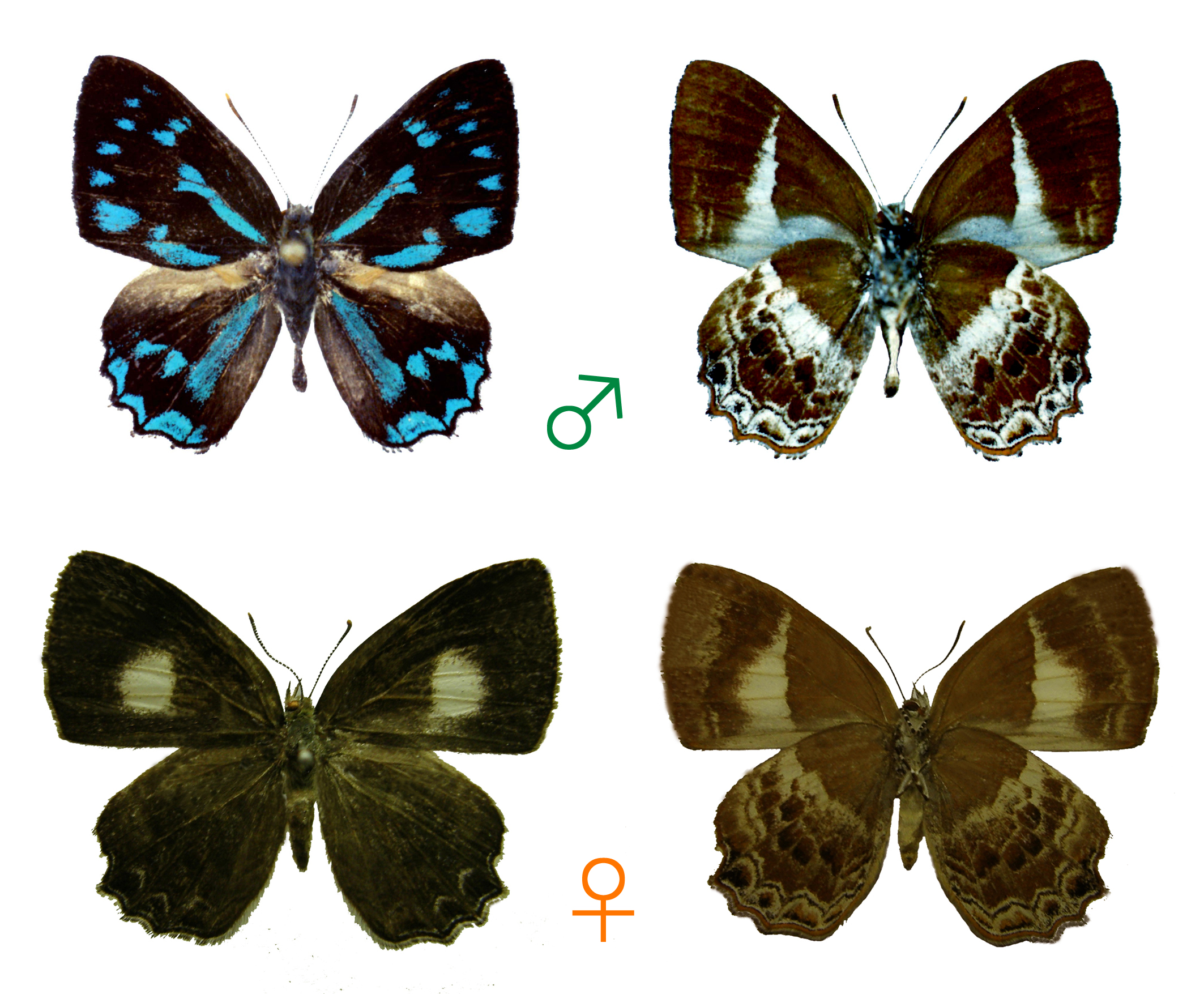
- Poritia phalena hayashii

Scientific classification
- Kingdom: Animalia
- Phylum: Arthropoda
- Clade: Pancrustacea
- Class: Insecta
- Order: Lepidoptera
- Family: Lycaenidae
- Genus: Poritia
- Species: P. phalena

Binomial name
- Poritia phalena (Hewitson, 1874)

Synonyms
- Simiskina phalena (Hewitson, 1874)

= Poritia phalena =

Species of butterfly

Poritia phalena, the broad-banded brilliant, is a small butterfly found in India and South-East Asia that belongs to the lycaenids or blues family. The species was first described by William Chapman Hewitson in 1874.

== Range ==
It occurs in South Asia from Assam in India to southern Myanmar. As per Markku Savela, the butterfly ranges from Assam, Myanmar, Peninsular Malaya, Java, Nias, Borneo and Thailand.

== Status ==
Very rare.

== Description ==
It is a small butterfly with a 28 to 34 mm wingspan. The male is black above with brilliant greenish-blue streaks and spots, while the female is dark brown above with a white circular spot in the discal region of the forewing. Below, there are no bands of linked spots.

== Taxonomy ==
The butterfly was earlier and continues to be classified by some authorities as Simiskina phalena (Hewitson, 1874). The subspecies that occur in South Asia are:

- P. p. harterti Doherty 1889 – Assam to southern Myanmar, very rare
- P. p. hayashii (Schröder & Treadaway, 1979)
- P. p. howarthi (H. Hayashi, 1976)
- P. p. ilagana Osada & Hashimoto, [1987]
- P. p. javanica Fruhstorfer – Java
- P. p. niasina Fruhstorfer – Nias

== See also ==
- List of butterflies of India
- List of butterflies of India (Lycaenidae)
