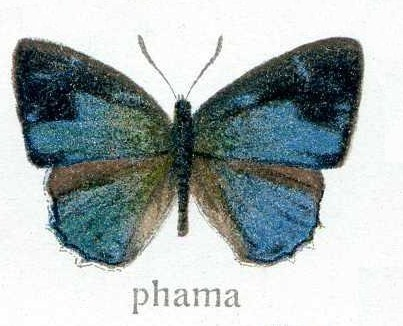
- Poritia phama

Scientific classification
- Kingdom: Animalia
- Phylum: Arthropoda
- Class: Insecta
- Order: Lepidoptera
- Family: Lycaenidae
- Subfamily: Poritiinae
- Tribe: Poritiini
- Genus: Poritia; Moore, [1866]

= Poritia =

Butterfly genus in family Lycaenidae

Poritia is a genus of lycaenid butterflies. The species of this genus are found in the Indomalayan realm. Poritia was erected by Frederic Moore in 1887.

== Species ==
- Poritia erycinoides (C. Felder & R. Felder, 1865)
- Poritia fruhstorferi Corbet, 1940 Java
- Poritia hewitsoni Moore, [1866]
  - Poritia hewitsoni ampsaga Fruhstorfer, 1912
  - Poritia hewitsoni hewitsoni
  - Poritia hewitsoni kiyokoae Morita & Yago, 2004
  - Poritia hewitsoni solitaria Schröder & Treadaway, 1989
  - Poritia hewitsoni taleva Corbet, 1940
  - Poritia hewitsoni tavoyana Doherty, 1889
- Poritia ibrahimi Eliot & Kirton, 2000 Malaya
- Poritia karennia Evans, 1921 Burma
- Poritia kinoshitai Hayashi, 1976
- Poritia languana Schröder & Treadaway, 1986 Philippines
- Poritia manilia Fruhstorfer, 1912 Sumatra
- Poritia palos Osada, 1987 Sulawesi
- Poritia personata Osada, 1994 Sulawesi
- Poritia phalena (Hewitson, 1874) (mostly placed in Simiskina)
- Poritia phama H. H. Druce, 1895
- Poritia philota Hewitson, 1874
- Poritia phormedon H. H. Druce, 1895
- Poritia plateni Staudinger, 1889
- Poritia pleurata Hewitson, 1874
- Poritia promula Hewitson, 1874
- Poritia sumatrae (C. Felder & R. Felder, 1865)
