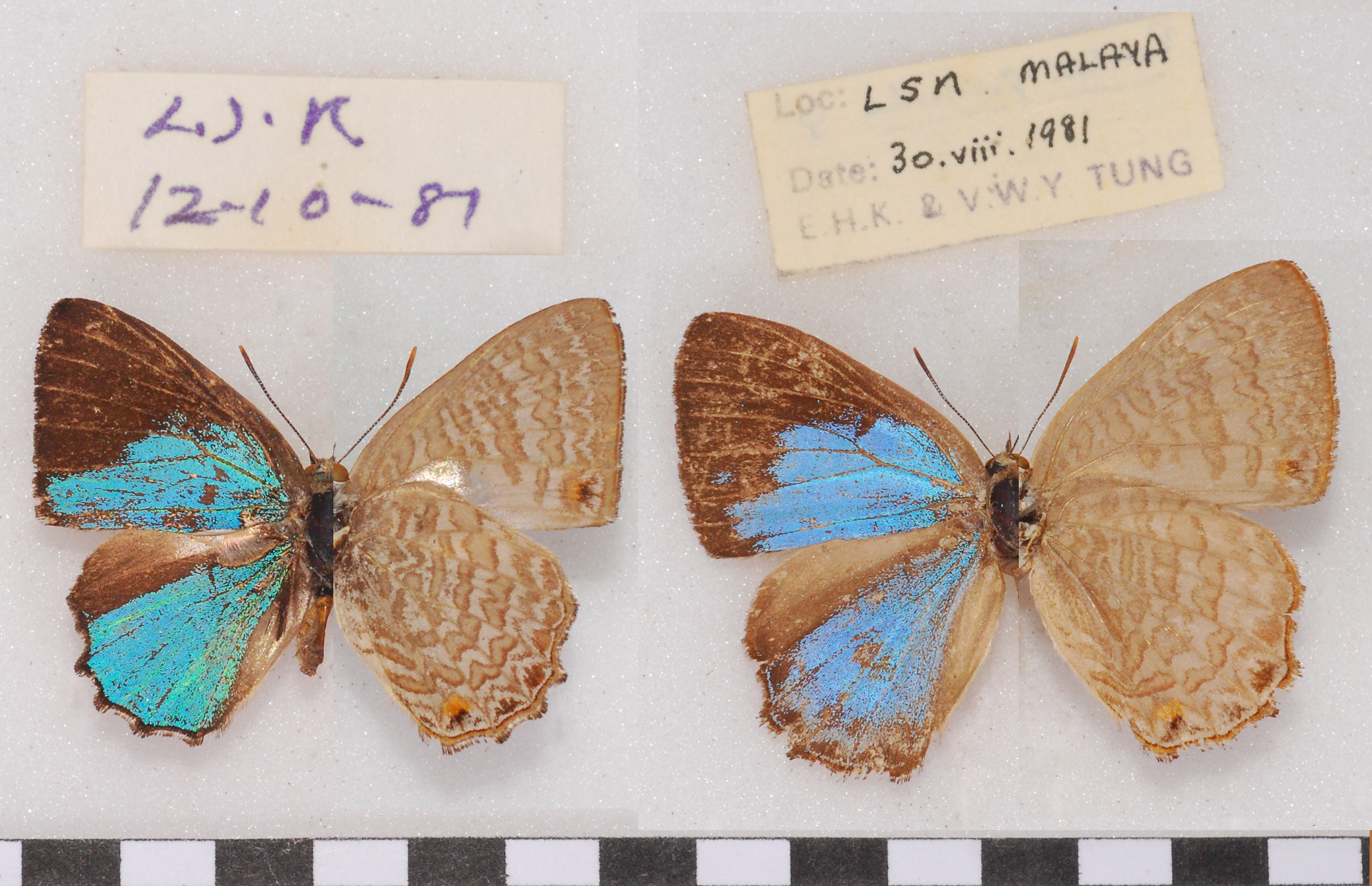

Scientific classification
- Kingdom: Animalia
- Phylum: Arthropoda
- Class: Insecta
- Order: Lepidoptera
- Family: Lycaenidae
- Genus: Poritia
- Species: P. promula

Binomial name
- Poritia promula Hewitson, 1874

Synonyms
- Poritia (Poritia) elegans Fruhstorfer, 1919

= Poritia promula =

Species of butterfly

Poritia promula is a butterfly in the family Lycaenidae. It was described by William Chapman Hewitson in 1874. It is found in the Indomalayan realm.

== Subspecies ==
- Poritia promula promula (Java)
- Poritia promula elegans Fruhstorfer, 1919 (Peninsular Malaysia)
