= Posy (disambiguation) =

A posy is a small flower bouquet, typically given as a gift.

Posy may also refer to:

- Blue posy, a species of butterfly of the family Lycaenidae
- Common posy, a butterfly in the family Lycaenidae
- Brassica 'Petit Posy', a cross between brussels sprouts and kale
- Lincolnshire Posy, a musical piece by Percy Grainger for concert band
- Posy ring, a gold finger ring with a short inscription

First name

- Posy Fossil, a character in the book Ballet Shoes
- Posy Miller, British actor
- Posy Simmonds, British cartoonist, writer, and illustrator

Surname

- Carl Posy, Israeli philosopher

== See also ==
- Posies (disambiguation)
