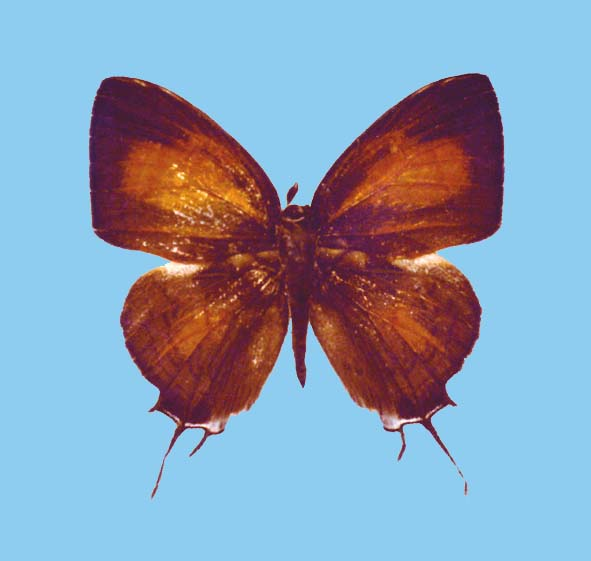
- Male upperside
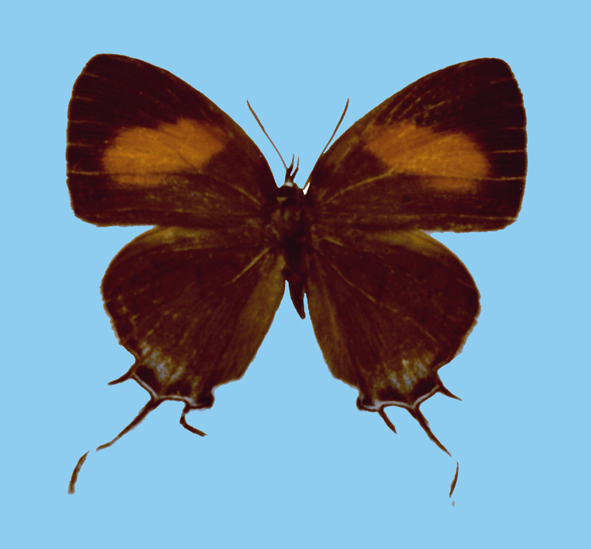
- Female upperside

Scientific classification
- Domain: Eukaryota
- Kingdom: Animalia
- Phylum: Arthropoda
- Class: Insecta
- Order: Lepidoptera
- Family: Lycaenidae
- Genus: Drupadia
- Species: D. theda
- Subspecies: D. t. nobumasai

Trinomial name
- Drupadia theda nobumasai H. Hayashi. 1984

= Drupadia theda nobumasai =

Subspecies of butterfly

Drupadia theda nobumasai is a subspecies of butterfly in the family Lycaenidae. It is found in Indonesia (Simeulue).

Etymology. The subspecific name is dedicated to Mr. nobumasa HAYASHI, the brother of the author.
