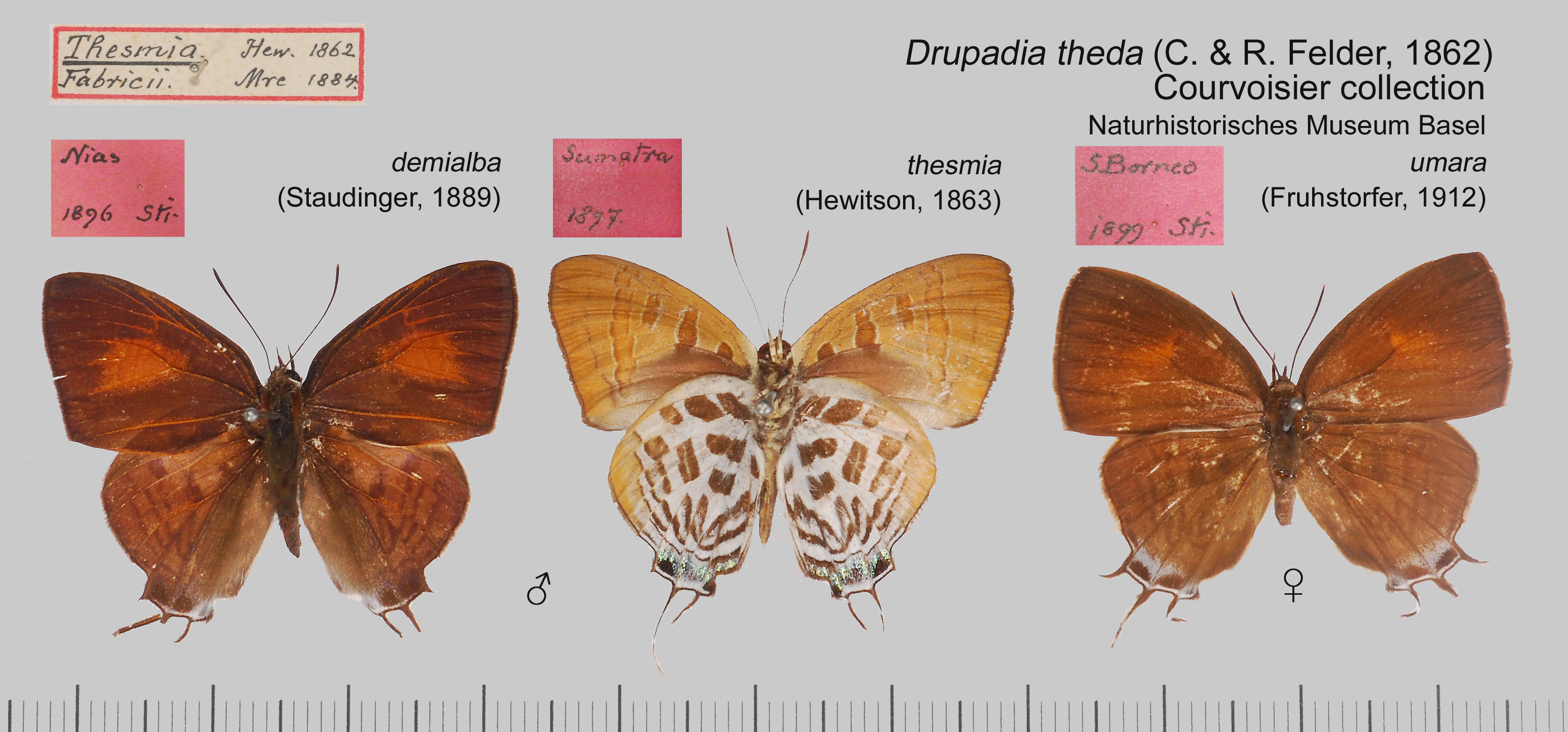
- Drupadia theda From the Courvoisier Collection, Basel, Switzerland
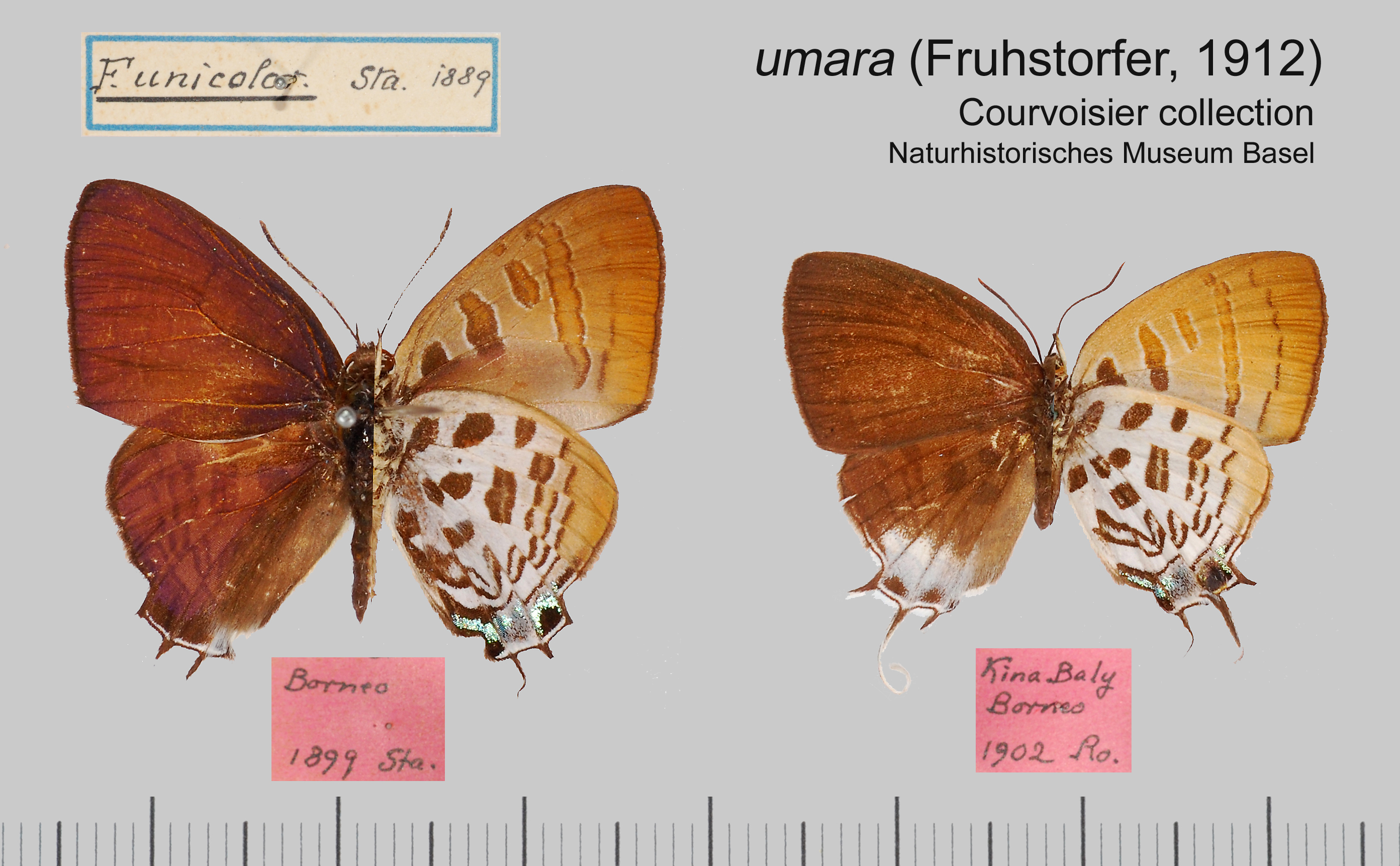
- Drupadia theda umara

Scientific classification
- Domain: Eukaryota
- Kingdom: Animalia
- Phylum: Arthropoda
- Class: Insecta
- Order: Lepidoptera
- Family: Lycaenidae
- Genus: Drupadia
- Species: D. theda

Binomial name
- Drupadia theda (C. Felder & R. Felder, 1862)

Synonyms
- Myrina theda C. & R. Felder, 1862; Drupadia nishiyamai Hayashi, 1980; Myrina thesmia Hewitson, 1863; Biduanda thesmia thesmia f. minara Fruhstorfer, 1912; Myrina namusa Hewitson, 1863; Myrina naenia Hewitson, 1863; Drupadia fabricii Moore, 1884; Biduanda imitata Druce, 1895; Sithon thaliarchus Staudinger, 1888; Sithon thesmia var. unicolor Staudinger, 1889; Sithon thesmia var. demialba Staudinger, 1889; Biduanda thesmia batunensis Fruhstorfer, 1912; Biduanda thesmia umara Fruhstorfer, 1912; Biduanda thesmia umara f. depicta Fruhstorfer, 1912; Biduanda thesmia vanica Fruhstorfer, 1912; Biduanda bangkaiensis Ribbe, 1926; Biduanda inexpectata Ribbe, 1926; Biduanda renonga Corbet, 1938; Marmessus thesmia albicans Riley, [1945]; Marmessus thesmia pagiensis Riley, [1945]

= Drupadia theda =

Species of butterfly

Drupadia theda, the dark posy, is a species of butterfly belonging to the lycaenid family described by Cajetan Felder and Rudolf Felder in 1862. It is found in the Indomalayan realm.

The larvae feed on Barringtonia, Saraca, Bauhinia, Millettia, Garcinia, Lansium, Ixora (including Ixora humilis), Arytera, Pometia and Lepisanthes species. They are attended by ants of the genus Crematogaster, including Crematogaster diffiformis.

== Subspecies ==
- Drupadia theda theda (Philippines: Luzon, Mindoro, Cebu, Mindanao, Marinduque)
- Drupadia theda thesmia (Hewitson, 1863) (Sumatra, Peninsular Malaysia, Singapore)
- Drupadia theda namusa (Hewitson, 1863) (southern Sulawesi)
- Drupadia theda fabricii Moore, 1884 (Mergui, southern Burma, Thailand)
- Drupadia theda thaliarchus (Staudinger, 1888) (northern Sulawesi)
- Drupadia theda unicolor (Staudinger, 1889) (Palawan)
- Drupadia theda demialba (Staudinger, 1889) (Nias)
- Drupadia theda batunensis (Fruhstorfer, 1912) (Batu)
- Drupadia theda umara (Fruhstorfer, 1912) (Borneo)
- Drupadia theda vanica (Fruhstorfer, 1912) (Borneo)
- Drupadia theda bangkaiensis (Ribbe, 1926) (Banggai)
- Drupadia theda inexpectata (Ribbe, 1926) (Sulawesi)
- Drupadia theda renonga (Corbet, 1938) (Thailand, Langkawi)
- Drupadia theda albicans (Riley, [1945]) (Sipora)
- Drupadia theda pagiensis (Riley, [1945]) (northern Pagi Islands)
- Drupadia theda fulgens Cowan, 1974 (Bangka)
- Drupadia theda pekas Takanami, 1982 Philippines (north-eastern Mindanao)
- Drupadia theda miyo Takanami, 1987 (Philippines: eastern Mondoro)
- Drupadia theda osadai Takanami, 1987 (Philippines: Bohol)
- Drupadia theda tawiensis Schröder & Treadaway, 1989 (Philippines: Tawitawi Group)
- Drupadia theda nobumasai H. Hayashi. 1984
