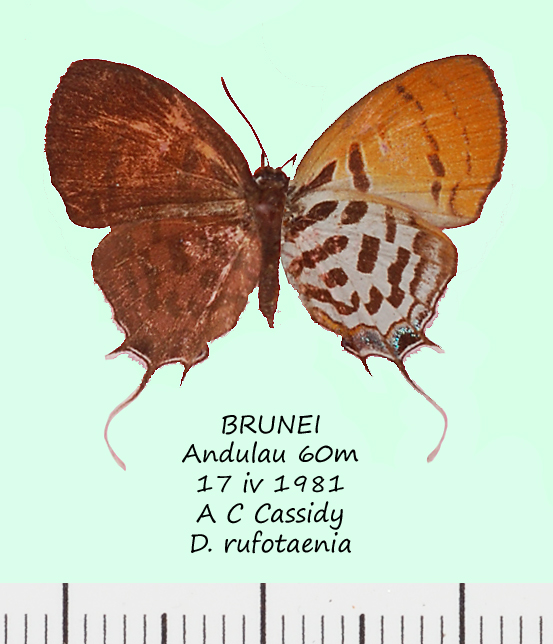

Scientific classification
- Kingdom: Animalia
- Phylum: Arthropoda
- Class: Insecta
- Order: Lepidoptera
- Family: Lycaenidae
- Genus: Drupadia
- Species: D. rufotaenia

Binomial name
- Drupadia rufotaenia (Fruhstorfer, 1912)

Synonyms
- Marmessus rufotaenia Fruhstorfer, 1912; Marmessus archbaldi Evans, 1932; Marmessus archbaldi alcyma Riley, [1945]

= Drupadia rufotaenia =

Species of butterfly

Drupadia rufotaenia is a species of butterfly belonging to the lycaenid family described by Hans Fruhstorfer in 1912. It is found in the Indomalayan realm.

== Subspecies ==
- Drupadia rufotaenia rufotaenia (Peninsular Malaysia, Singapore, north-eastern Sumatra, Borneo: eastern Sarawak)
- Drupadia rufotaenia archbaldi (Evans, 1932) (Burma, Mergui, Thailand, Langkawi)
- Drupadia rufotaenia alcyma (Riley, [1945]) (south-western Sumatra)
- Drupadia rufotaenia caesia Cowan, 1974 (Nias)
- Drupadia rufotaenia kina Cowan, 1974 (Borneo: Kina Balu, Kretam Hill)
- Drupadia rufotaenia torquata Cowan, 1974 (Philippines: Palawan)
- Drupadia rufotaenia praecox Cowan, 1974 (Philippines: Mindoro)
