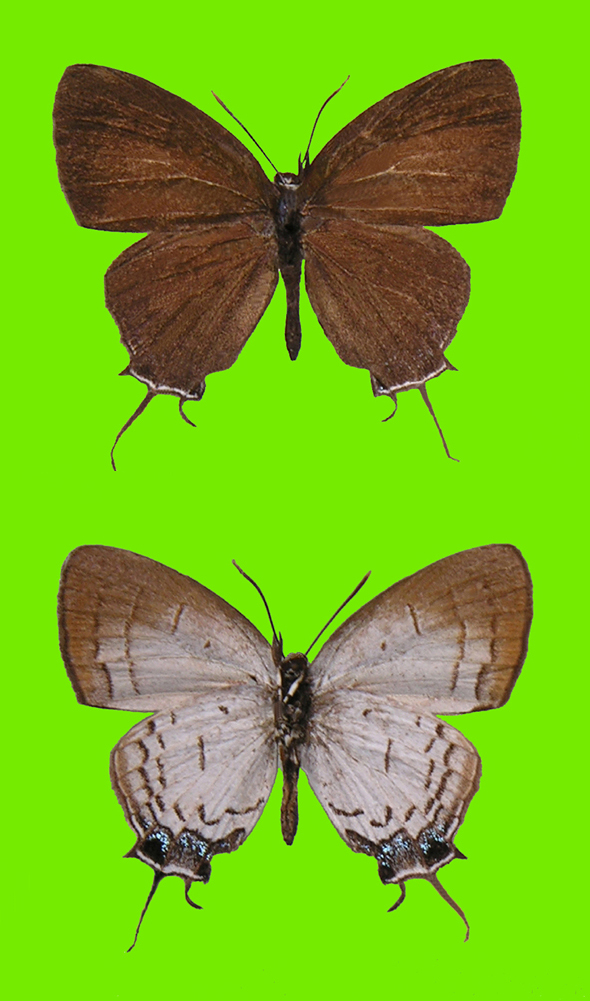
- Male

Scientific classification
- Kingdom: Animalia
- Phylum: Arthropoda
- Clade: Pancrustacea
- Class: Insecta
- Order: Lepidoptera
- Family: Lycaenidae
- Genus: Drupadia
- Species: D. hayashii

Binomial name
- Drupadia hayashii Schrőder & Treadaway, 1989

= Drupadia hayashii =

Species of butterfly

Drupadia hayashii is a butterfly of the family Lycaenidae. It is found in the Philippines (Tawi Tawi-Province, Sibutu Island). Forewing length:11-15mm. It is rare and very localized Drupadia so far found only on Sibutu Island in small clearings in secondary forest. Normally they are seldom seen in flight and it is necessary to create movement amongst the bushes and lowest branches of trees in such a clearing in order to disturb these butterflies. Both the male and female are very small and have a weak flight, so it is no surprising that they seldom fly more than 3 to 5 meters before they settle on a leaf and then often crawl under it. Since most of the secondary forest on this island has either been cut down or burnt, it is possible that this species is either close to extinction or perhaps already extinct.

Etymology. The specific name is dedicated to Japanese lepidopterist, Hisakazu HAYASHI.
