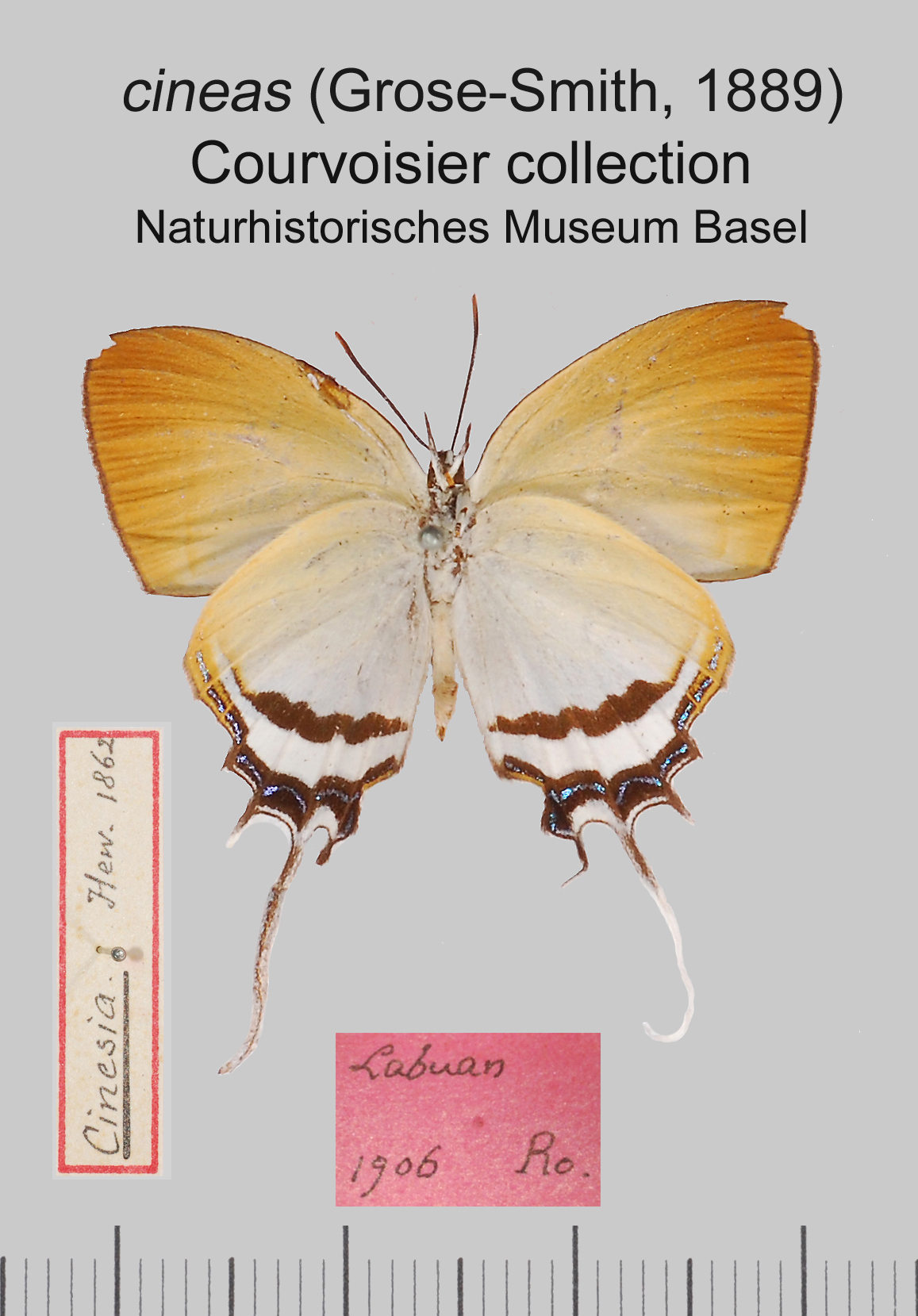
- From the Courvoisier Collection, Basel, Switzerland

Scientific classification
- Domain: Eukaryota
- Kingdom: Animalia
- Phylum: Arthropoda
- Class: Insecta
- Order: Lepidoptera
- Family: Lycaenidae
- Genus: Drupadia
- Species: D. cineas

Binomial name
- Drupadia cineas (Grose-Smith, 1889)

Synonyms
- Sithon cineas Grose-Smith, 1889; Biduanda hewitsonii Druce, 1895; Biduanda hewitsonii var. parva Moulton, [1912]

= Drupadia cineas =

Species of butterfly

Drupadia cineas is a butterfly in the family Lycaenidae. It was described by Henley Grose-Smith in 1889. It is endemic to Borneo.
