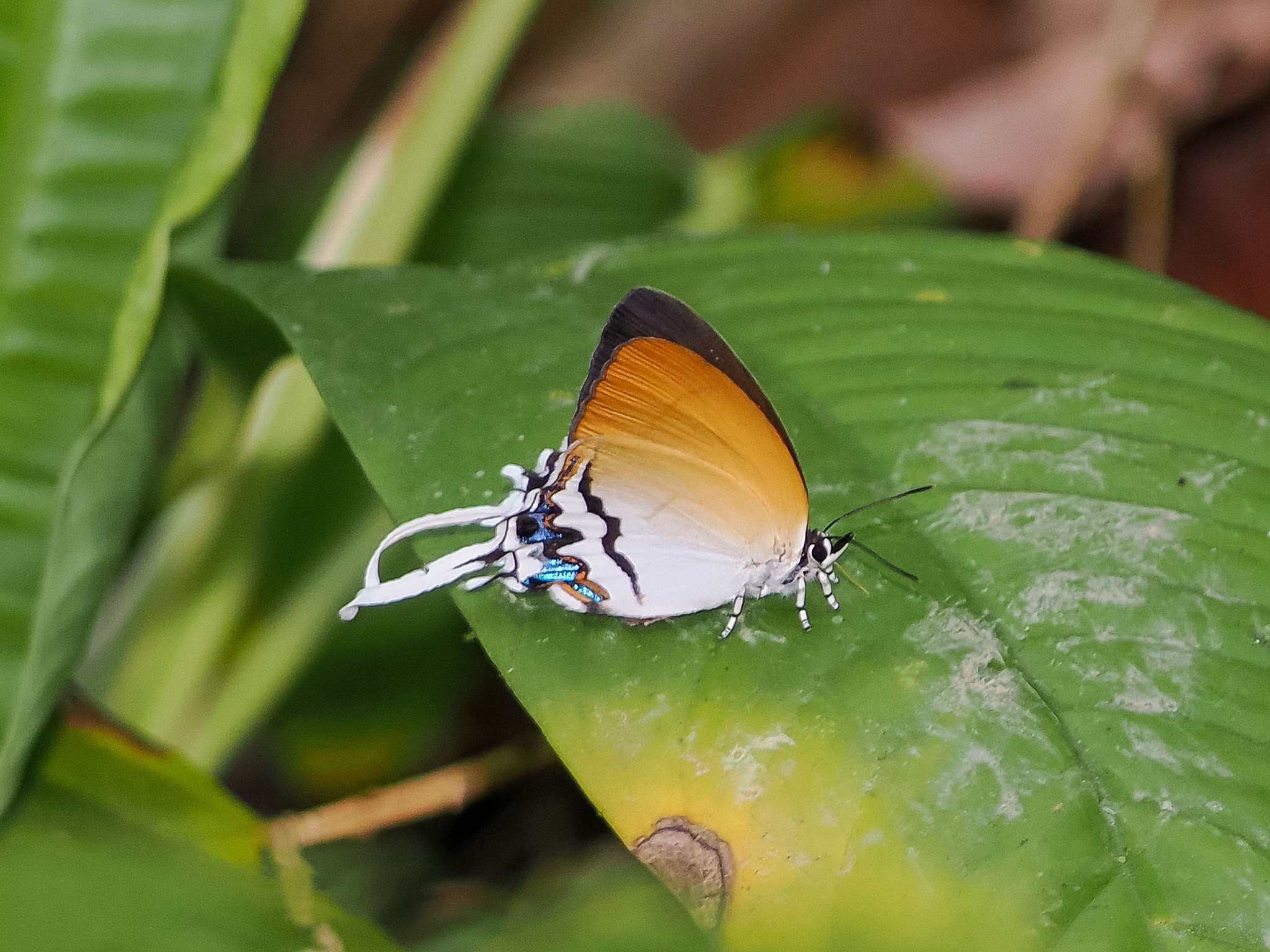

Scientific classification
- Domain: Eukaryota
- Kingdom: Animalia
- Phylum: Arthropoda
- Class: Insecta
- Order: Lepidoptera
- Family: Lycaenidae
- Genus: Drupadia
- Species: D. cinesoides

Binomial name
- Drupadia cinesoides (de Nicéville, 1889)

= Drupadia cinesoides =

Species of butterfly

Drupadia cinesoides is a butterfly in the family Lycaenidae. It was described by British entomologist Lionel de Nicéville in 1889. It is found in the Indomalayan realm (Peninsular Malaya, Sumatra).
