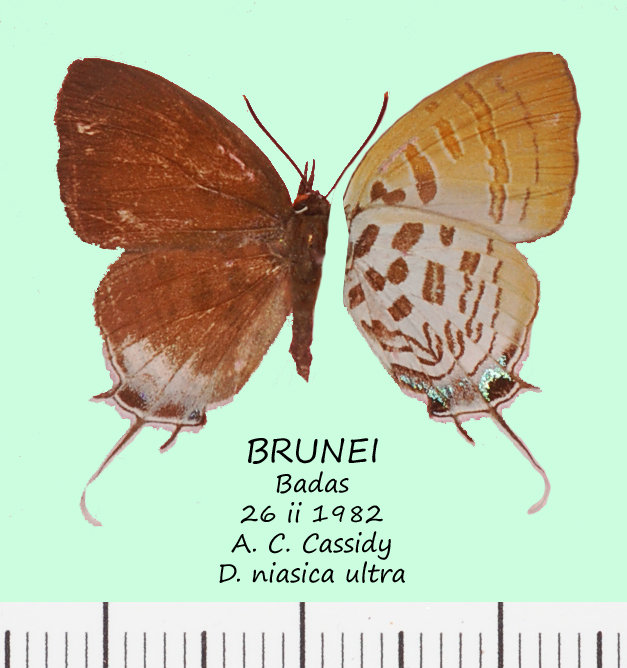

Scientific classification
- Domain: Eukaryota
- Kingdom: Animalia
- Phylum: Arthropoda
- Class: Insecta
- Order: Lepidoptera
- Family: Lycaenidae
- Genus: Drupadia
- Species: D. niasica

Binomial name
- Drupadia niasica (Julius Röber, 1886)

Synonyms
- Sithon niasica Röber, 1886; Biduanda scudderii Doherty, 1889; Biduanda thaenia Druce, 1895; Marmessus scudderii biranta Riley, 1942; Marmessus scudderii perlisa Riley, 1942; Drupadia niasica cuboidea Okubo, 1983; Marmesseus scudderii karnyi Riley, [1945]

= Drupadia niasica =

Species of butterfly

Drupadia niasica is a species of butterfly belonging to the lycaenid family described by Julius Röber in 1886. It is found in the Indomalayan realm.

== Subspecies ==
- Drupadia niasica niasica (Nias)
- Drupadia niasica scudderii (Doherty, 1889) (southern Burma, Mergui)
- Drupadia niasica thaenia (Druce, 1895) (Borneo)
- Drupadia niasica biranta (Riley, 1942) (Langkawi)
- Drupadia niasica perlisa (Riley, 1942) (Peninsular Malaysia)
- Drupadia niasica karnyi (Riley, [1945]) (Siberut)
- Drupadia niasica ianthina Cowan, 1974 (Batu)
- Drupadia niasica ultra Cowan, 1974 (Borneo: Sarawak, S.Kalimantan, Pulau Laut)
- Drupadia niasica florens Cowan, 1974 (Philippines: Mindanao)
- Drupadia niasica ohtai H. Hayashi, 1984 (Indonesia: northern Sumatra)
- Drupadia niasica takioi H. Hayashi, 1984 (Indonesia: Simeulue)
- Drupadia niasica natinis Takanami, 1987 (Philippines: Mindoro)
