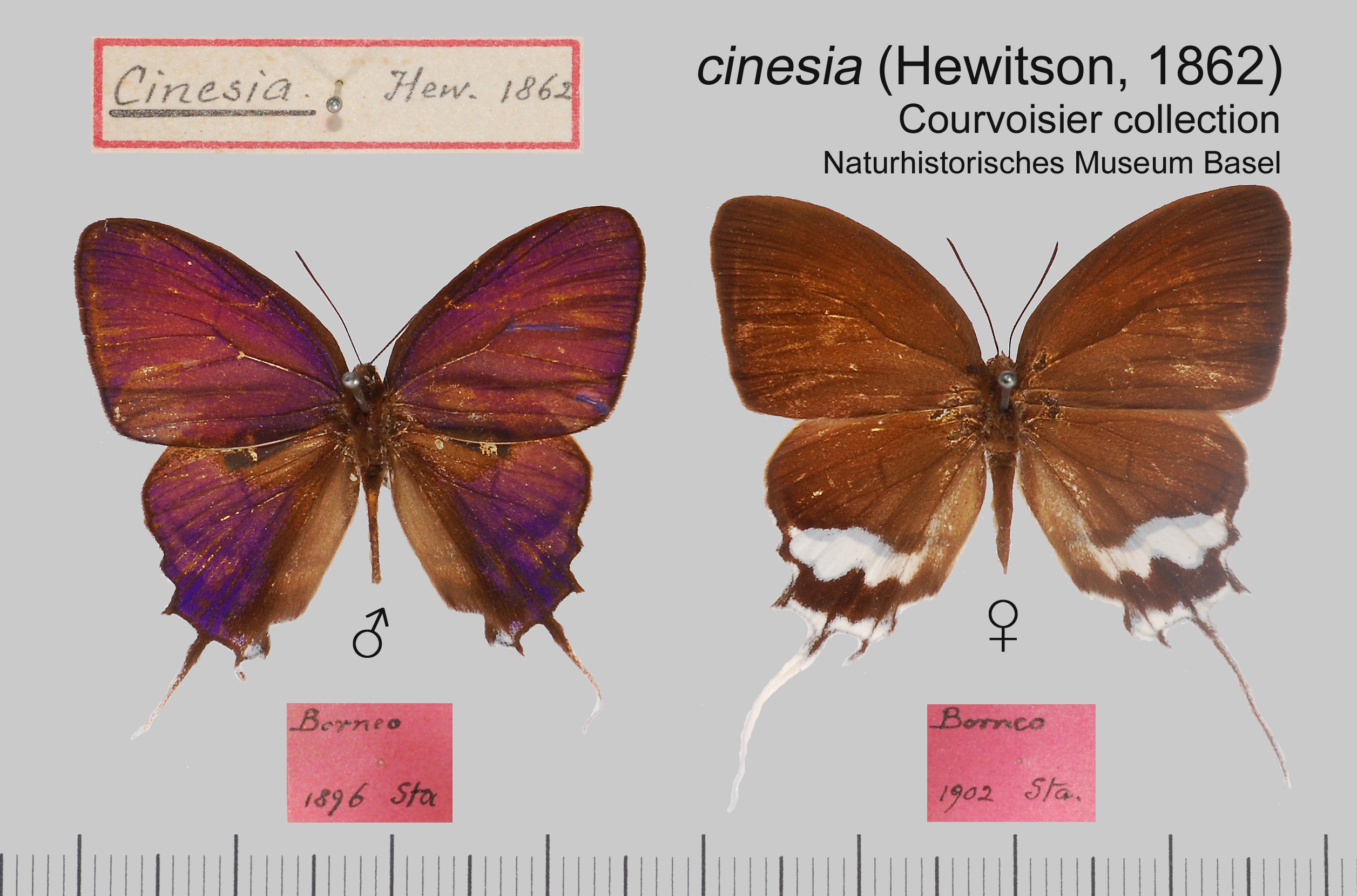

Scientific classification
- Domain: Eukaryota
- Kingdom: Animalia
- Phylum: Arthropoda
- Class: Insecta
- Order: Lepidoptera
- Family: Lycaenidae
- Genus: Drupadia
- Species: D. cinesia

Binomial name
- Drupadia cinesia (Hewitson, 1863)

Synonyms
- Myrina cinesia Hewitson, 1863; Hypolycaena cinesia; Biduanda cinesia

= Drupadia cinesia =

Species of butterfly

Drupadia cinesia is a butterfly in the family Lycaenidae. It was described by William Chapman Hewitson in 1863. It is found on Borneo.
