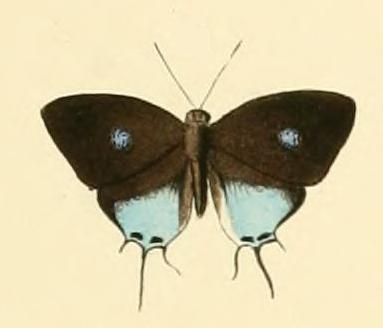

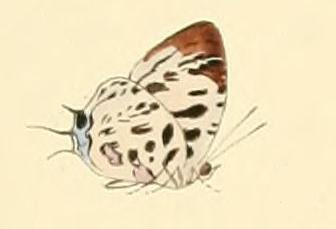

Scientific classification
- Domain: Eukaryota
- Kingdom: Animalia
- Phylum: Arthropoda
- Class: Insecta
- Order: Lepidoptera
- Family: Lycaenidae
- Genus: Drupadia
- Species: D. scaeva

Binomial name
- Drupadia scaeva Bethune-Baker, 1908

Synonyms
- Myrina scaeva Hewitson, 1863; Biduanda scaeva; Marmessus scaeva scaeva; Biduanda melisa cooperi Tytler, 1940; Myrina cyara Hewitson, 1878; Biduanda cyara; Biduanda melisa cyara; Marmessus scaeva cyara; Myrina melisa Hewitson, 1869; Biduanda melisa; Marmessus scaeva melisa

= Drupadia scaeva =

Blue posy

Species of butterfly

Drupadia scaeva, the blue posy, is a species of butterfly of the family Lycaenidae. It is found in South-East Asia.

== Subspecies ==
- Drupadia scaeva scaeva (Peninsular Malaya, Singapore, Langkawi, Pulau Tioman, Borneo, Sumatra)
- Drupadia scaeva cooperi (Tytler, 1940) (central Burma, northern Thailand)
- Drupadia scaeva cyara (Hewitson, 1878) (Bhutan, Sikkim, Assam, north-western Burma)
- Drupadia scaeva melisa (Hewitson, 1869) (southern Burma, Mergui, southern Thailand)

== See also ==
- List of butterflies of India
- List of butterflies of India (Lycaenidae)
