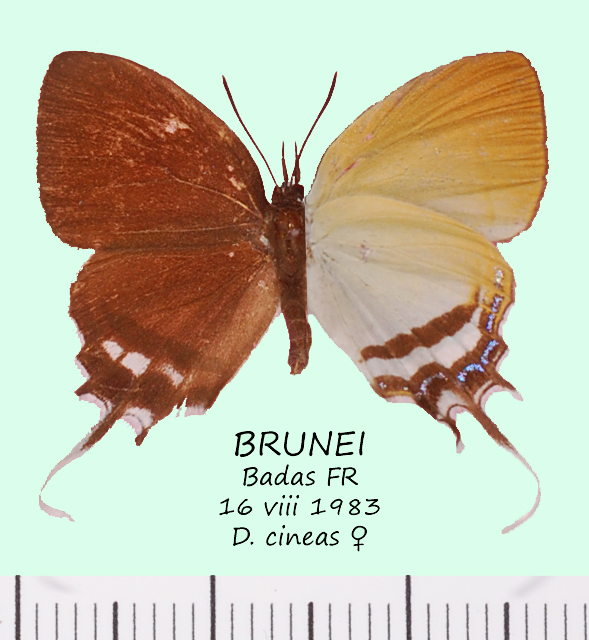
- Drupadia cineas

Scientific classification
- Kingdom: Animalia
- Phylum: Arthropoda
- Clade: Pancrustacea
- Class: Insecta
- Order: Lepidoptera
- Family: Lycaenidae
- Subfamily: Theclinae
- Tribe: Cheritrini
- Genus: Drupadia; Moore, 1884

Synonyms
- Biduanda Distant, 1884

= Drupadia =

Butterfly genus in family Lycaenidae

Drupadia is a butterfly genus in the family Lycaenidae. They are commonly known as posies. The members (species) of this genus are found in the Indomalayan realm.

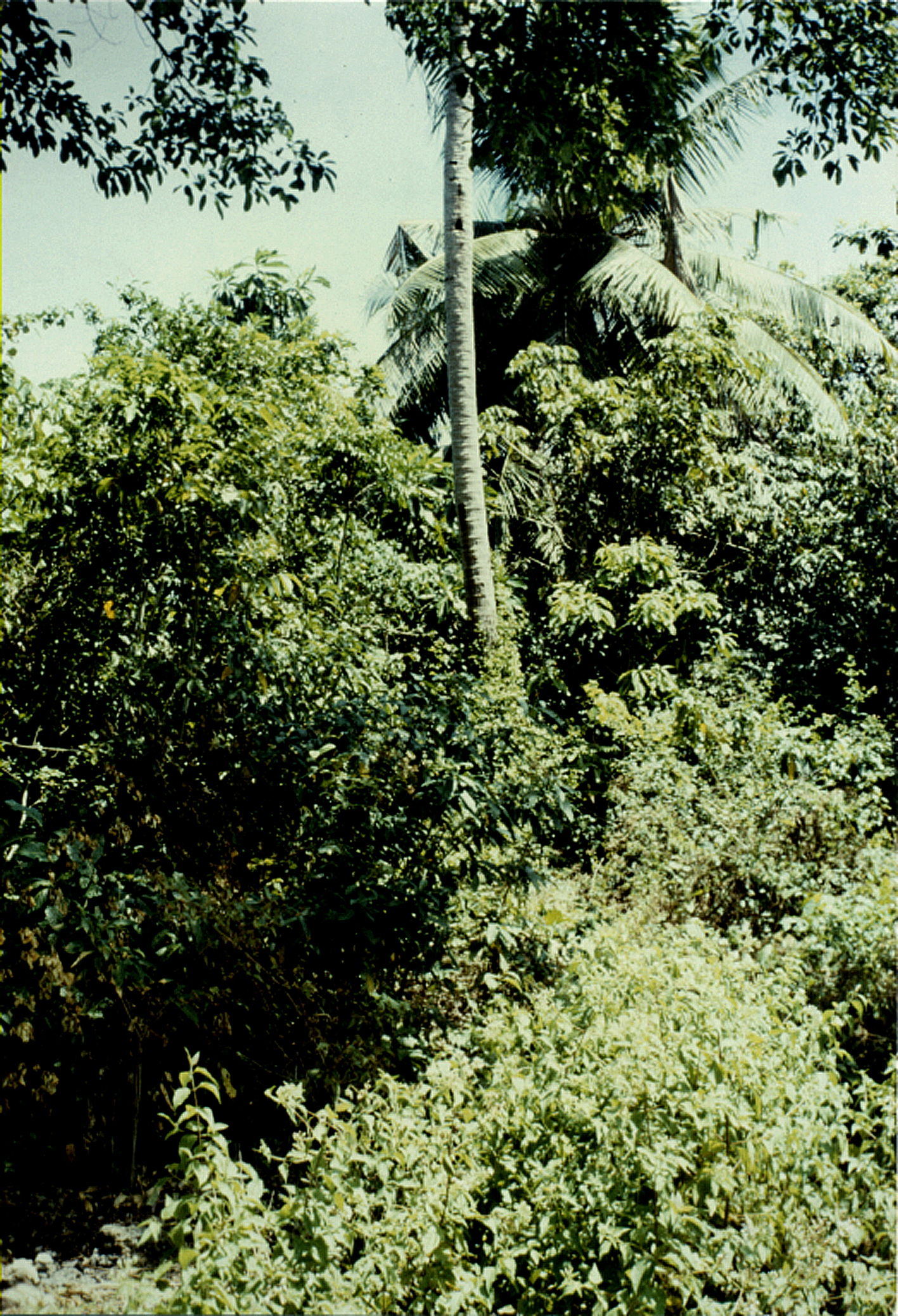
Habitat of Drupadia hayashii on Sibutu Island

== Species ==
- Drupadia cinderella Cowan, 1974 Borneo, Sarawak
- Drupadia cindi Cowan, 1974 Borneo, Sabah
- Drupadia cineas (Grose-Smith, 1889)
- Drupadia cinesia (Hewitson, 1863)
- Drupadia cinesoides (de Nicéville, 1889)
- Drupadia estella (Hewitson, 1863) Indonesia, Sumatra
- Drupadia hayashii Schroeder & Treadaway, 1989
- Drupadia johorensis (Cowan, 1958) Malaysia
- Drupadia niasica (Röber, 1886)
- Drupadia ravindra (Horsfield, [1829])
- Drupadia rufotaenia (Fruhstorfer, 1912)
- Drupadia scaeva (Hewitson, 1863)
- Drupadia theda (C. & R. Felder, 1862)
