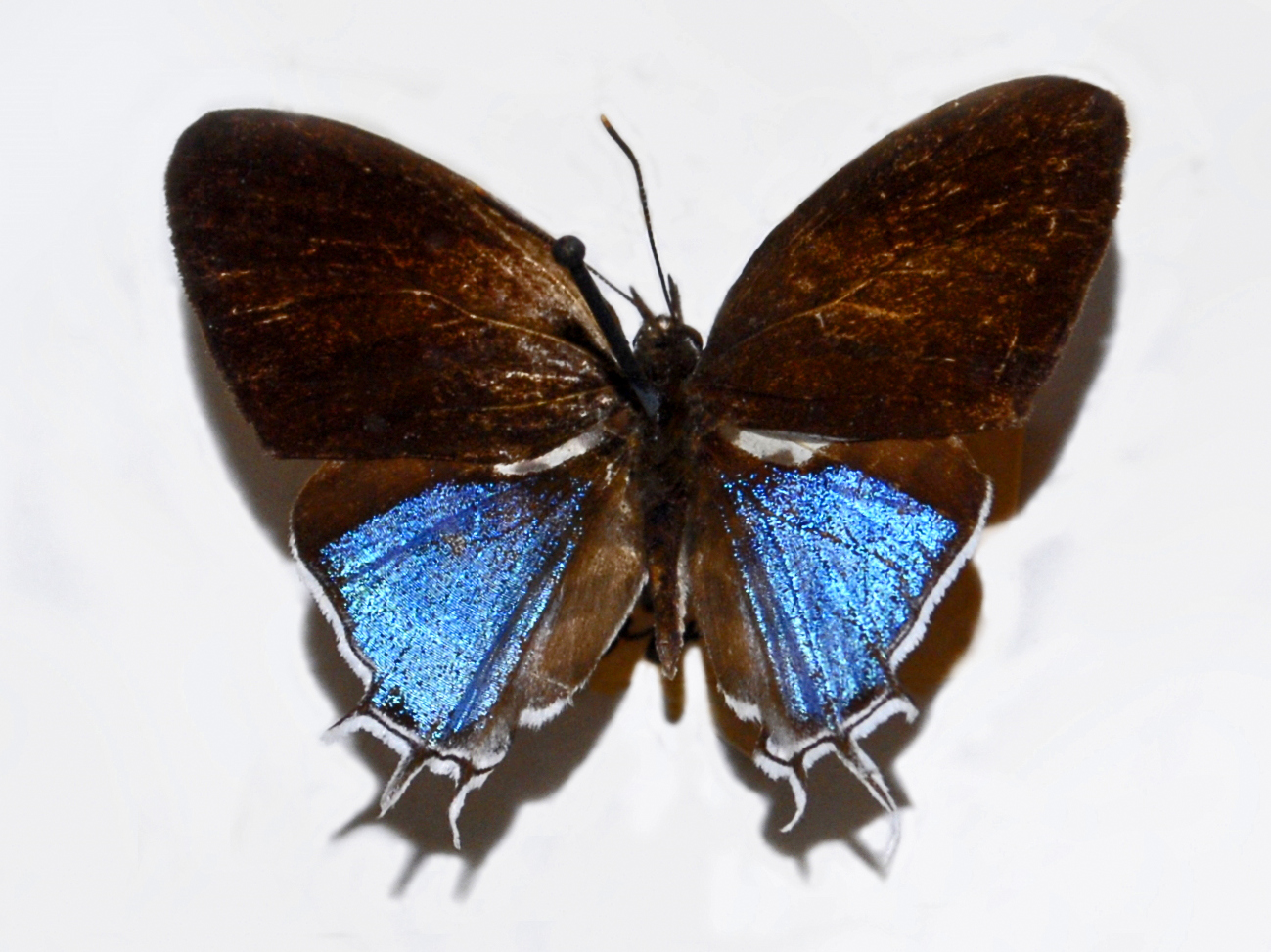
- Drupadia ravindra moorei from Borneo. Mounted specimen

Scientific classification
- Domain: Eukaryota
- Kingdom: Animalia
- Phylum: Arthropoda
- Class: Insecta
- Order: Lepidoptera
- Family: Lycaenidae
- Genus: Drupadia
- Species: D. ravindra

Binomial name
- Drupadia ravindra (Horsfield, 1829)

Synonyms
- Myrina ravindra Horsfield, [1829]; Thecla ravindra Horsfield, [1829]; Papilio lisias Fabricius, 1787 (preocc.); Marmessus ravindra ravindra ab. transiens Kalis, 1933; Marmessus ravindra medullia Fruhstorfer, 1912; Biduanda thesmia javanica Toxopeus, 1932; Sithon moorei Distant, 1882; Biduanda similis Druce, 1895; Marmessus moorei sumatranus Fruhstorfer, 1912; Marmessus moorei sumatranus f. battakana Fruhstorfer, 1912; Marmessus moorei nola Fruhstorfer, 1912; Drupadia boisduvalii Moore, 1884; Marmessus boisduvali var. atra Druce, 1896; Marmessus lisias boisduvalii f. alcira Fruhstorfer, 1912; Drupadia caesarea Weymer, 1887; Sithon moorei var. niasica Staudinger, 1889; Sithon ravindra var. niasicola Staudinger, 1889; Sithon ravindra var. ravindrina Staudinger, 1889; Sithon ravindra var. joloana Staudinger, 1889; Marmessus surindra var. albula Druce, 1895; Sithon moorei var. fulminans Staudinger, 1889; Marmessus surindra Druce, 1895; Biduanda esla Swinhoe, [1912]; Marmessus lisias iskander Fruhstorfer, 1912; Marmessus lisias lisiades Fruhstorfer, 1912; Marmessus lisias serunicus van Eecke, 1914; Marmessus ravindra balina Fruhstorfer, 1914; Mermessus ravindra sumptuosa Toxopeus, 1931; Marmessus lisias connexa Riley, [1945]; Marmessus lisias batuna Riley, [1945]; Marmessus lisias janus Riley, [1945]; Mermessus lisias banka Riley, [1945]; Papilio lisias Fabricius, 1787

= Drupadia ravindra =

Species of butterfly

Drupadia ravindra, common name common posy, is a butterfly in the family Lycaenidae.

== Subspecies ==
- Drupadia ravindra ravindra - Java, Lombok
- Drupadia ravindra moorei (Distant, 1882) - S.Thailand, Peninsular Malaya, Singapore, Langkawi, NE.Sumatra, Borneo
- Drupadia ravindra boisduvalii Moore, 1884 - Burma, Mergui, N.Thailand, Indo China
- Drupadia ravindra caesarea Weymer, 1887 - Nias
- Drupadia ravindra ravindrina (Staudinger, 1889) - Palawan
- Drupadia ravindra joloana (Staudinger, 1889) - Philippines (Jolo, Sulu)
- Drupadia ravindra fulminans (Staudinger, 1889) – Borneo
- Drupadia ravindra surindra (Druce, 1895) - Borneo (Kina Balu, Sandakan)
- Drupadia ravindra esla (Swinhoe, 1912) - Sumatra (W.Barisan Mts.)
- Drupadia ravindra serunica (van Eecke, 1914) - Simeulue Is.
- Drupadia ravindra balina (Fruhstorfer, 1914) – Bali
- Drupadia ravindra sumptuosa (Toxopeus, 1931) - W.Sumatra (Lebong Tandai, Bengkulu)
- Drupadia ravindra connexa (Riley, 1945)
- Drupadia ravindra batuna (Riley, 1945) - Batu Is.
- Drupadia ravindra janus (Riley, 1945) - SW.Sumatra
- Drupadia ravindra banka (Riley, 1945)
- Drupadia ravindra corbeti Cowan, 1974 - S.Vietnam (Pulau Condor)
- Drupadia ravindra resoluta Cowan, 1974 - Philippines (Luzon, Mindoro)
- Drupadia ravindra caerulea Okubo, 1983
- Drupadia ravindra balabacola Schröder & Treadaway, 1990
- Drupadia ravindra okurai M. & T. Okano, 1991

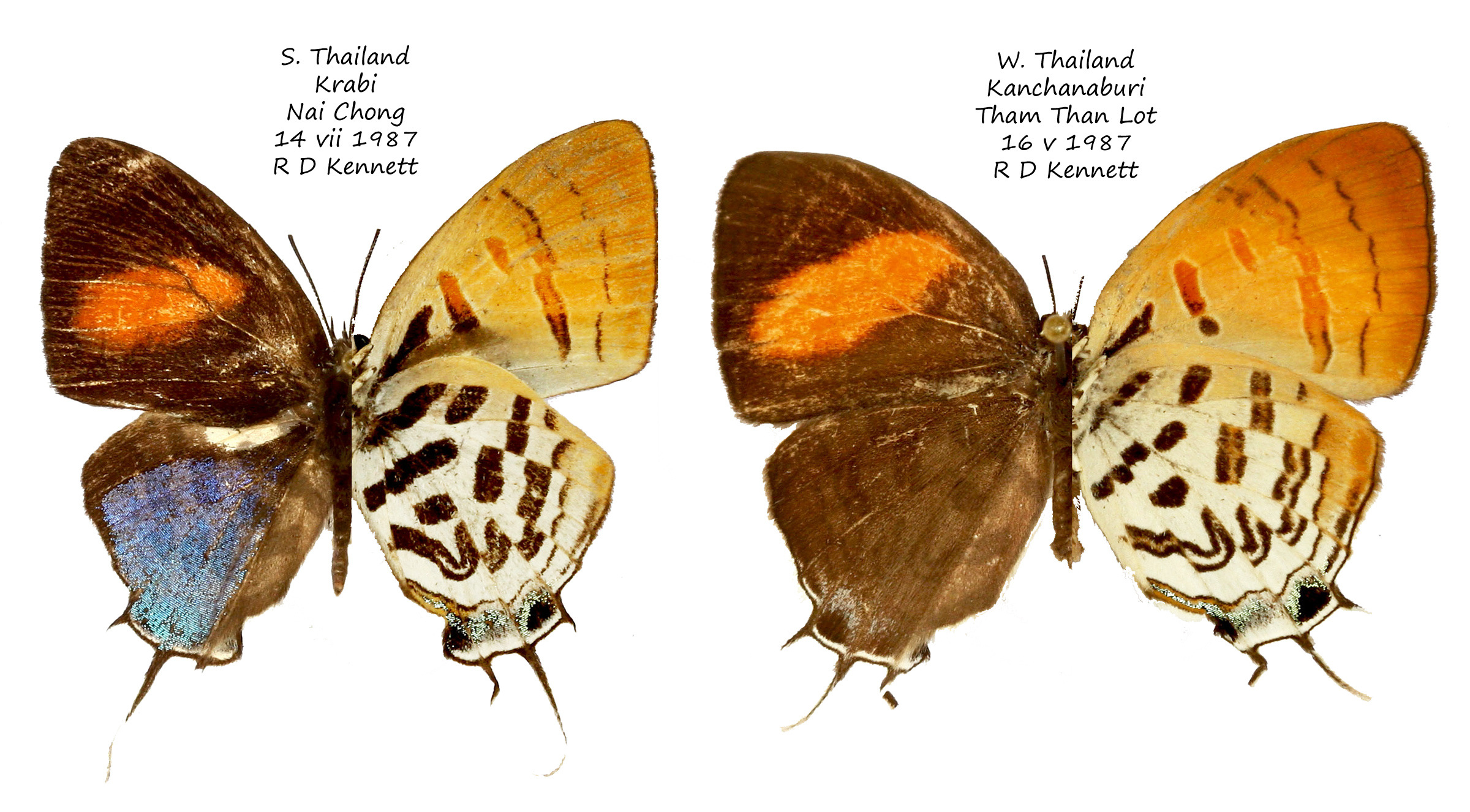
Drupadia ravindra boisduvalii

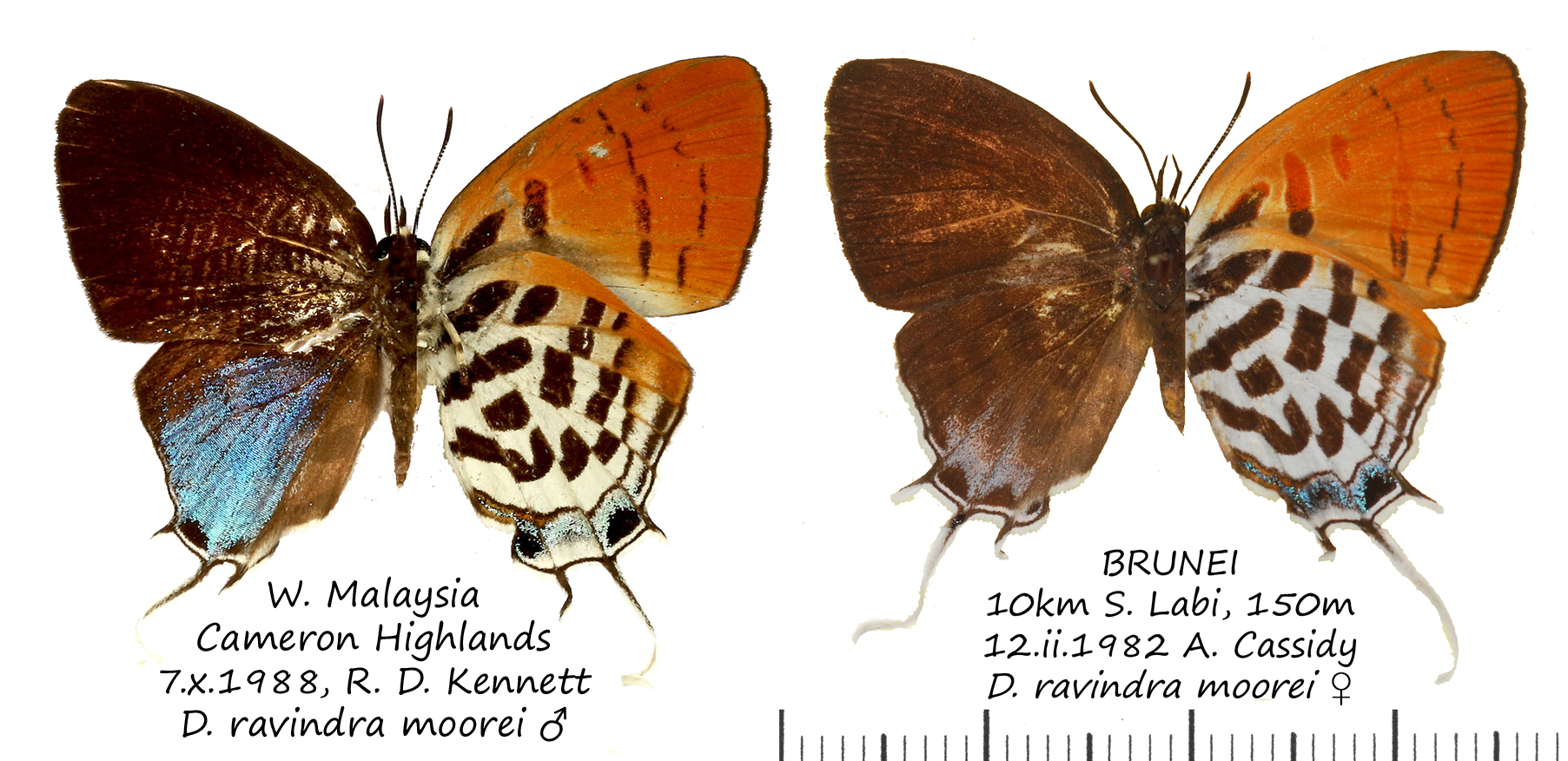
Drupadia ravindra moorei

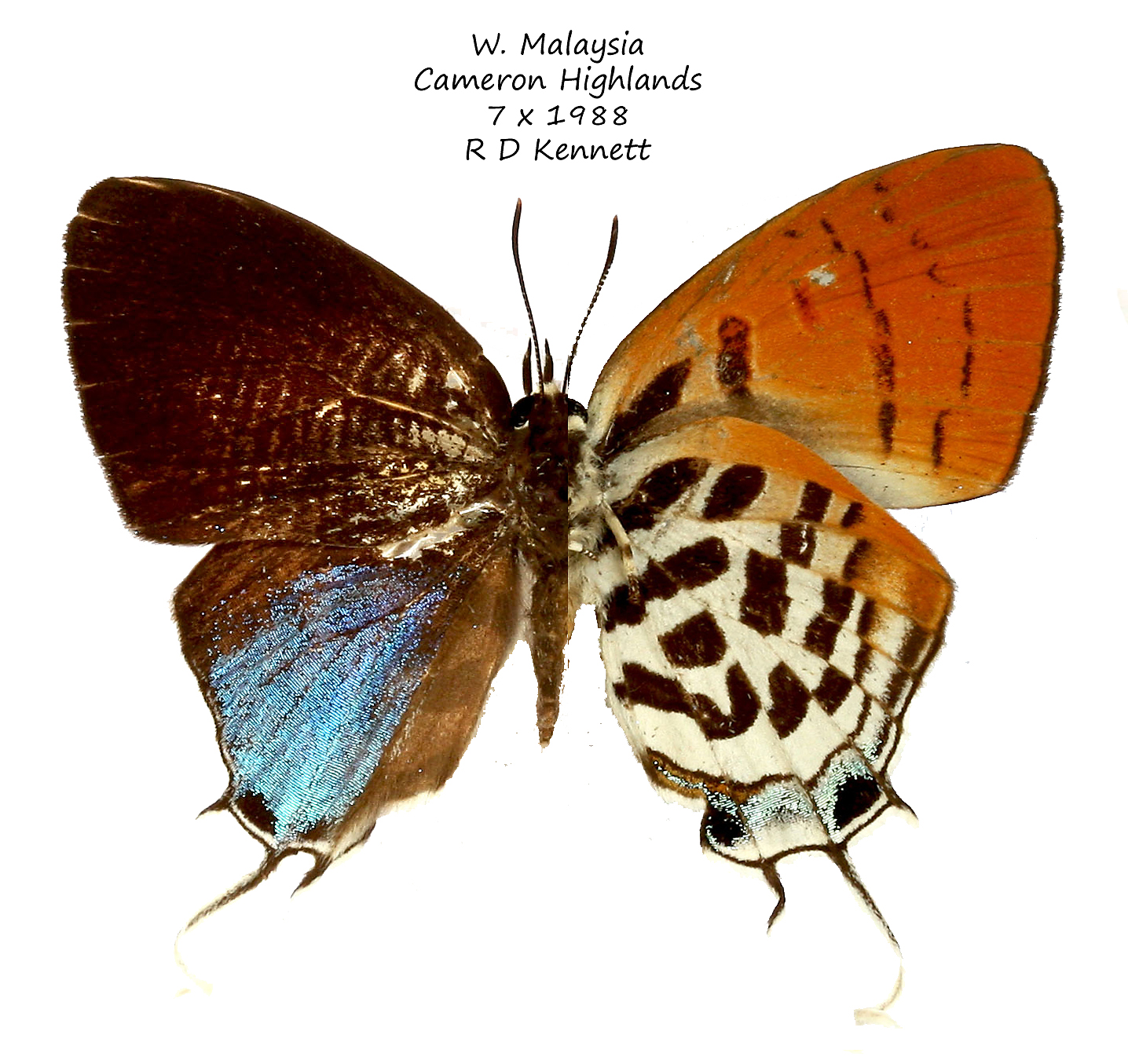
Drupadia ravindra moorei

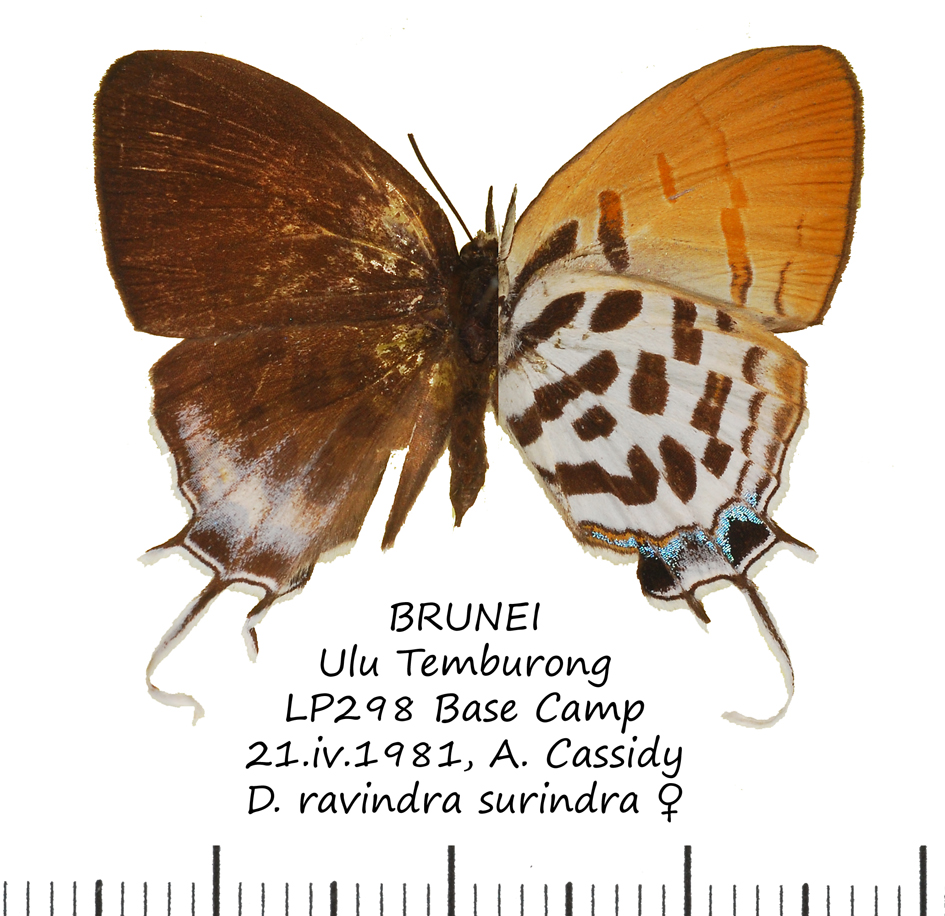
Drupadia ravindra surindra

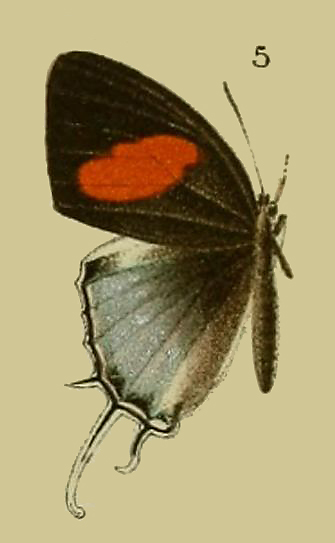
Drupadia ravindra serunica

== Description ==
Drupadia ravindra has a wingspan of about 30–35 millimetres (1.2–1.4 in). On the upperside the forewings of males are dark brown, while the hindwings are metallic blue. The females lack the metallic sheen. The underside of the hindwings of these butterflies show a pattern of black markings on a white background, while the forewings are orange. On the hindwings there are long tails.

Larvae feed on Derris scandens (Papilionaceae) and Saraca thaipingensis.

== Distribution and habitat ==
This species can be found in South Eastern Asia (mainly in Thailand, Peninsular Malaya, Singapore, Java, Sumatra, Borneo, Bali and Philippines. These butterflies prefer primary and secondary rainforest at an elevation of about 600 metres (2,000 ft) above sea level.

== Bibliography ==
- LepIndex: The Global Lepidoptera Names Index. Beccaloni G.W., Scoble M.J., Robinson G.S. & Pitkin B., 2005-06-15
