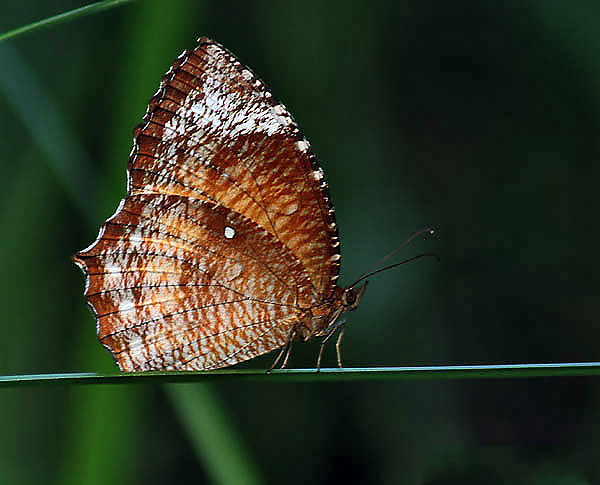
- Elymnias hypermenstra undularis

Scientific classification
- Kingdom: Animalia
- Phylum: Arthropoda
- Clade: Pancrustacea
- Class: Insecta
- Order: Lepidoptera
- Family: Nymphalidae
- Tribe: Elymniini
- Subtribe: Elymniina
- Genus: Elymnias; Hübner, 1818

Type species
- Elymnias jynx Hübner, 1818

Synonyms
- Didonis Hübner, [1819]; Dyctis Boisduval, 1832; Agrusia Moore, 1894; Bruasa Moore, 1894; Melynias Moore, 1894; Mimadelias Moore, 1894; Elymniopsis Fruhstorfer, 1907

= Elymnias =

Palmflies

Genus of butterflies

The palmflies are a common Asian butterfly genus found from India to the Solomon Islands. The caterpillars mimic leaves which they feed on. The adults mimic certain species (for example: E. cumaea looks like Melanitis leda).

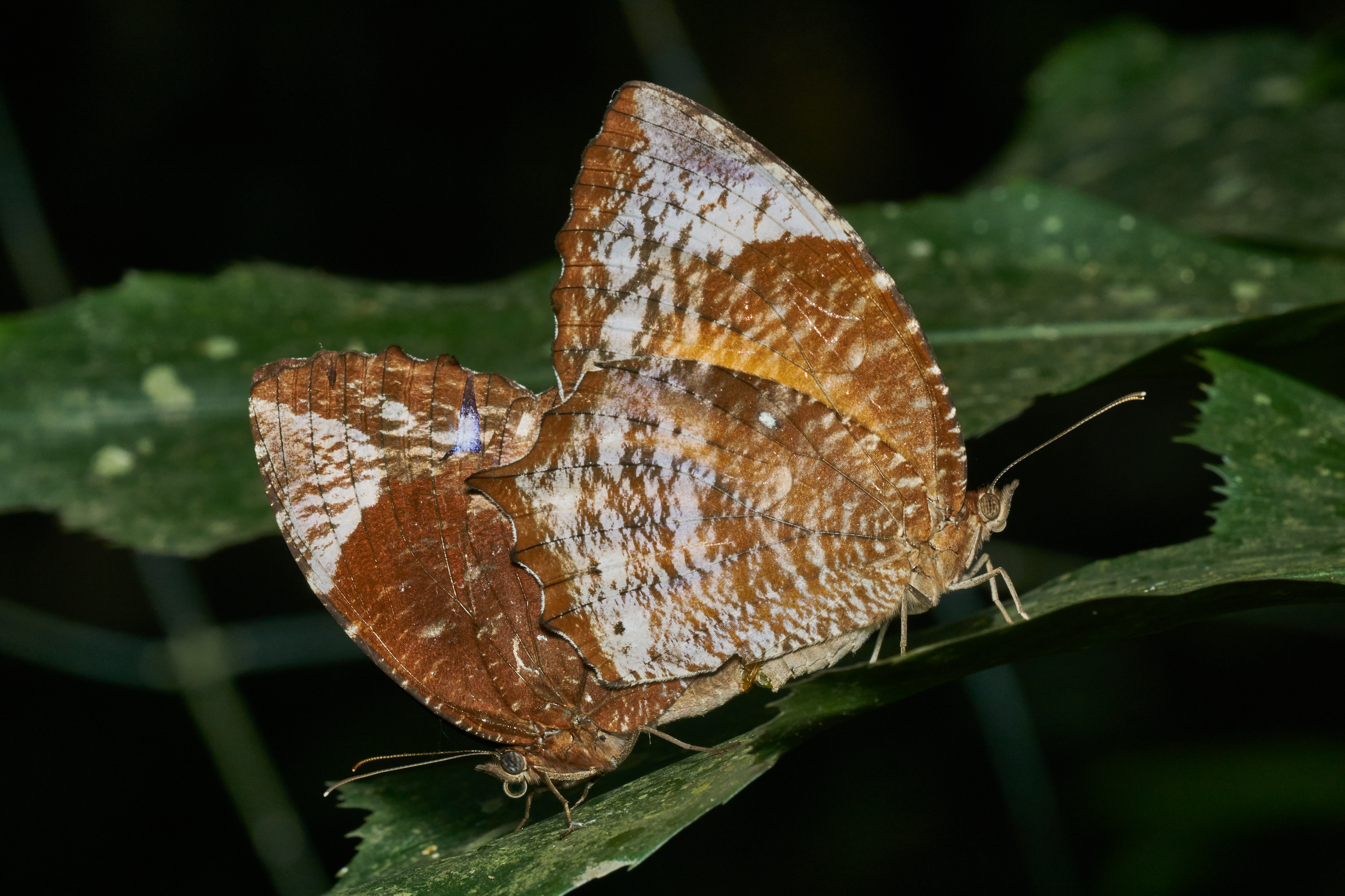
Elymnias caudata

== Species ==
This genus contains numerous species. They are listed below in alphabetical order within their species groups:

=== ceryx-group ===
- Elymnias ceryx (Boisduval, 1836)
- Elymnias kuenstleri Honrath, [1885]
- Elymnias pellucida Fruhstorfer, 1895

=== dara-group ===
- Elymnias dara Distant & Pryer, 1887

=== esaca-group ===
- Elymnias esaca (Westwood, 1851)
- Elymnias vasudeva Moore, 1857 – Jezebel palmfly

=== harterti-group ===
- Elymnias harterti Honrath, 1889

=== hypermnestra-group ===
- Elymnias caudata Butler, 1871
- Elymnias hypermnestra (Linnaeus, 1763) – common palmfly
- Elymnias leucocyma Godart, 1819 (incertae sedis)
- Elymnias merula Swinhoe, 1915 (incertae sedis)

=== melias-group ===
- Elymnias beza (Hewitson, 1877)
- Elymnias luteofasciata Okubo, 1980
- Elymnias melias (C. & R. Felder, 1863)
- Elymnias sansoni Jumalon, 1975

=== nepheronides-group ===
- Elymnias nepheronides Fruhstorfer, 1907

=== nesaea-group ===
- Elymnias amoena Tsukada & Nishiyama, 1979
- Elymnias kanekoi Tsukada & Nishiyama, 1980
- Elymnias malelas (Hewitson, 1863)
- Elymnias nesaea (Linnaeus, 1764) – tiger palmfly
- Elymnias saola Monastyrskii, 2004
- Elymnias saueri Distant, 1882

=== panthera-group ===
- Elymnias congruens Semper, 1887
- Elymnias miyagawai Saito & Kishi, 2012
- Elymnias obnubila Marshall & de Nicéville, 1883
- Elymnias panthera (Fabricius, 1787) – tawny palmfly

=== penanga-group ===
- Elymnias penanga (Westwood, 1851) – pointed palmfly

=== papua-group ===
- Elymnias papua Wallace, 1869

=== paradoxa-group ===
- Elymnias paradoxa Staudinger, 1894

=== patna-group ===
- Elymnias patna (Westwood, 1851) – blue-striped palmfly
- Elymnias pealii Wood-Mason, 1883 – Peal's palmfly

=== vitellia-group ===
- Elymnias agondas (Boisduval, 1832) – palmfly
- Elymnias bornemanni Ribbe, 1889
- Elymnias cumaea C. & R. Felder, [1867]
- Elymnias cybele (C. & R. Felder, 1860)
- Elymnias hicetas Wallace, 1869
- Elymnias holofernes (Butler, 1882)
- Elymnias mimalon (Hewitson, 1861)
- Elymnias phrikonis Fruhstorfer, 1899
- Elymnias resplendens Martin, 1929
- Elymnias sangira Fruhstorfer, 1899
- Elymnias umbratilis Joicey & Noakes, 1915
- Elymnias vitellia (Stoll, [1781])

=== Species not placed in a group ===
- Elymnias brookei Shelford, 1904
- Elymnias casiphone Geyer, [1827]
- Elymnias casiphonides Semper, 1892
- Elymnias cottonis (Hewitson, 1874)
- Elymnias detanii Aoki & Uémura, 1982
- Elymnias hewitsoni Wallace, 1869 – Hewitson's palmfly
- Elymnias kamara Moore, [1858]
- Elymnias lise (Hemming, 1960)
- Elymnias nelsoni Corbet, 1942
- Elymnias singhala Moore, [1875] – Ceylon palmfly
- Elymnias tamborana Okubo, 2010

=== Former species ===
- Elymniopsis bammakoo Westwood, 1851 – African palmfly

== Mimicry ==
Several species are mimics:

- Taenaris catops – E. agondas
- Euploea mulciber – E. kuenstleri
- Danaus chrysippus – E. hypermnestra
- Idea leuconoe – E. kuenstleri
- Delias pasithoe – E. esaca
- Parantica melaneus – E. ceryx

== See also ==
- Elymniopsis
