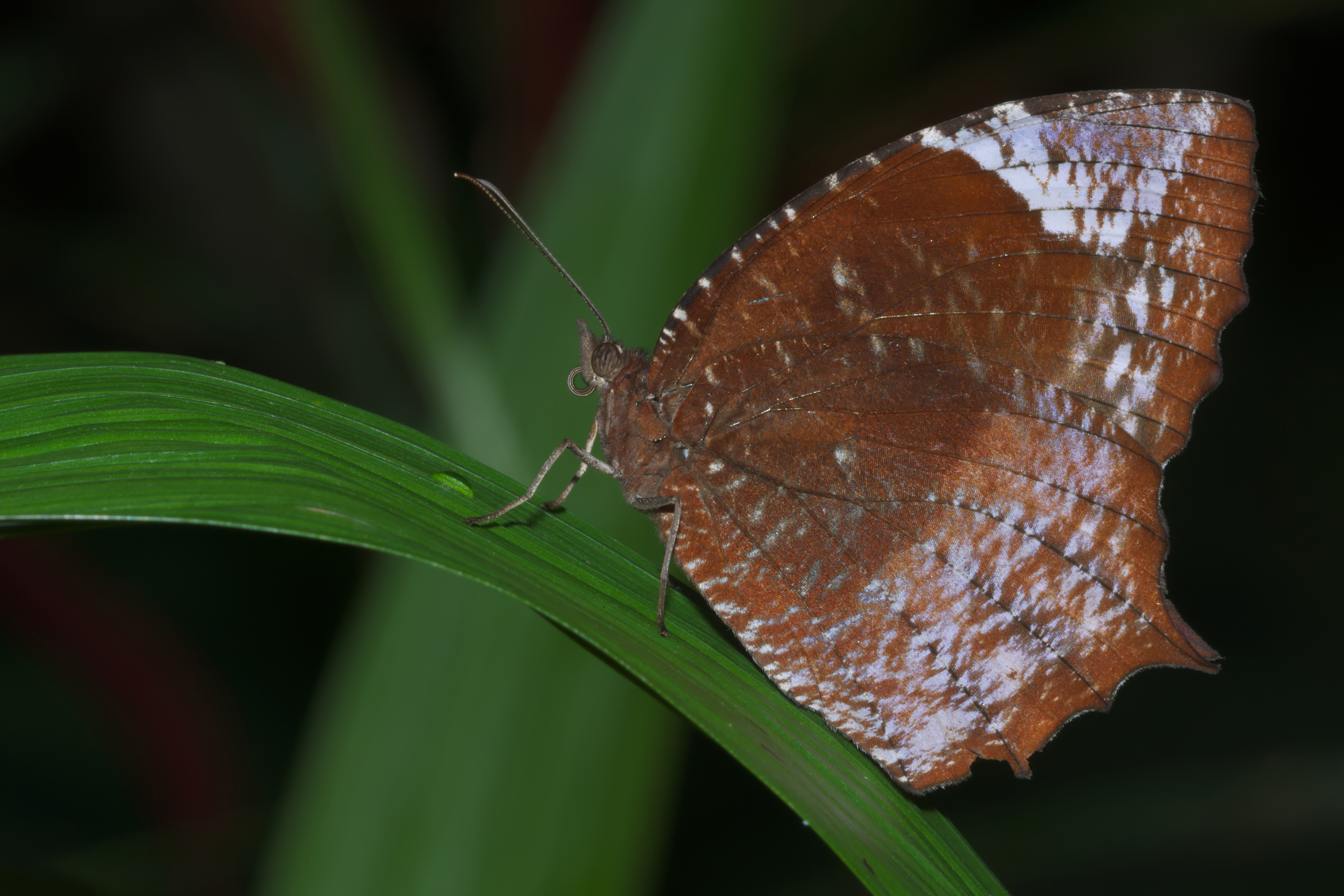
- Male
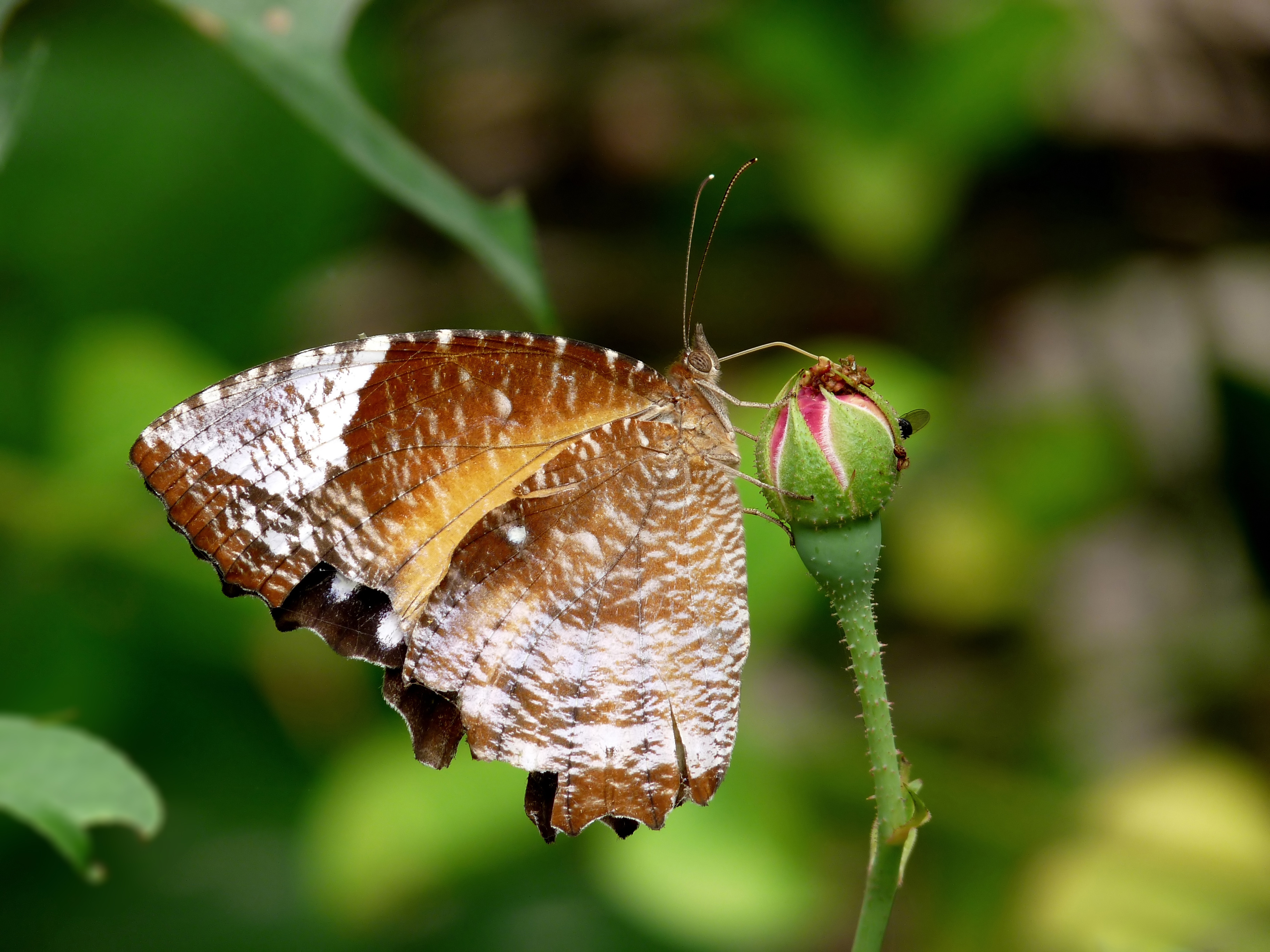
- Female

Scientific classification
- Kingdom: Animalia
- Phylum: Arthropoda
- Clade: Pancrustacea
- Class: Insecta
- Order: Lepidoptera
- Family: Nymphalidae
- Genus: Elymnias
- Species: E. caudata

Binomial name
- Elymnias caudata Butler, 1871
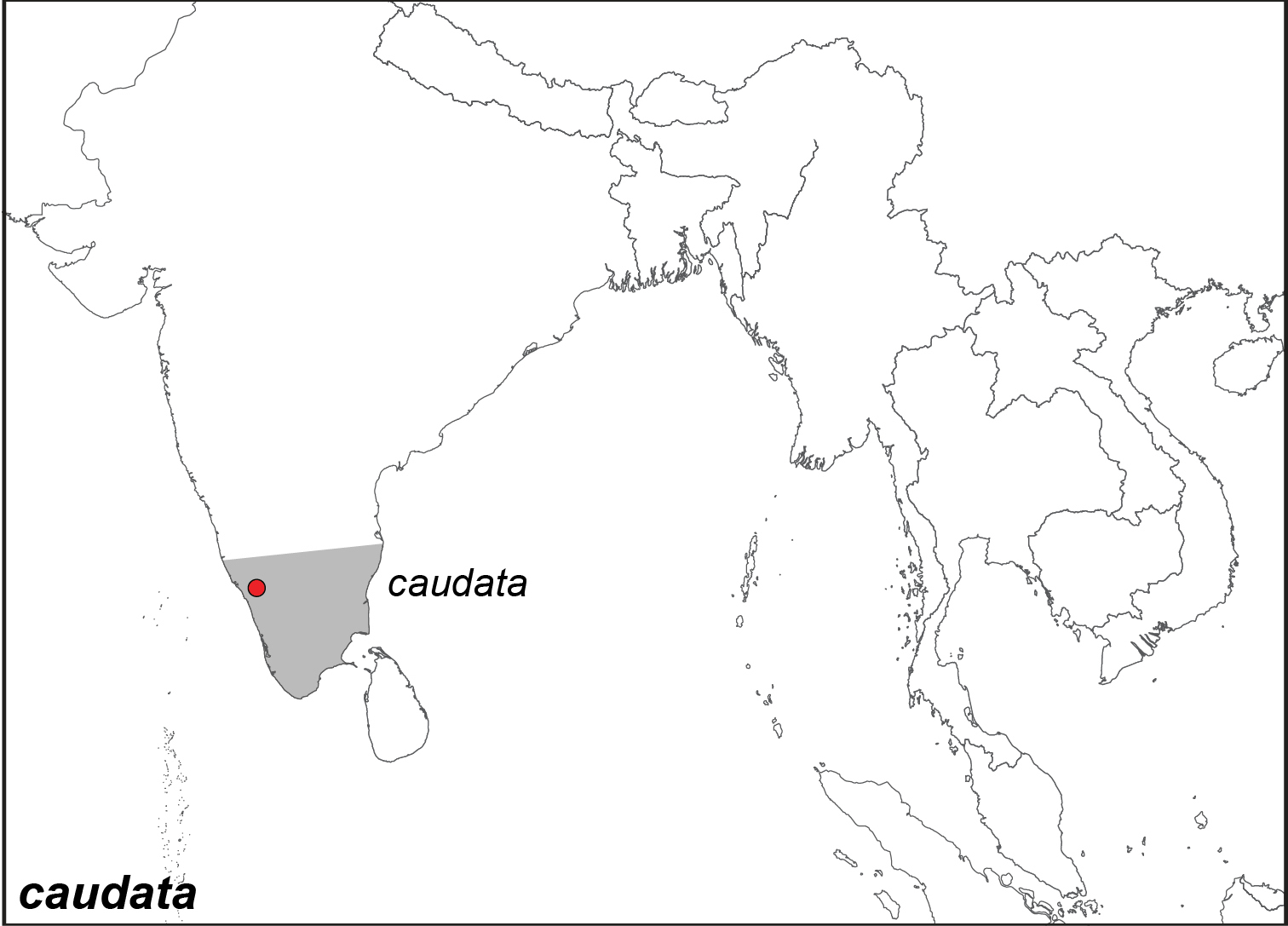

Synonyms
- Elymnias hypermnestra caudata

= Elymnias caudata =

Tailed palmfly

Species of butterfly

Elymnias caudata, the tailed palmfly, is a species of satyrine butterfly found in South India. Some authors consider this as a subspecies of Elymnias hypermnestra.

== Description ==
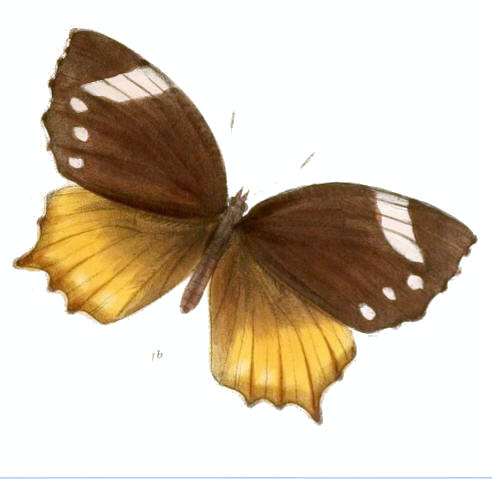
Male (upperside)

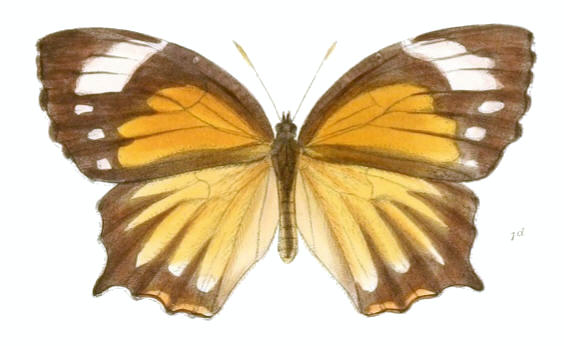
Female (upperside)

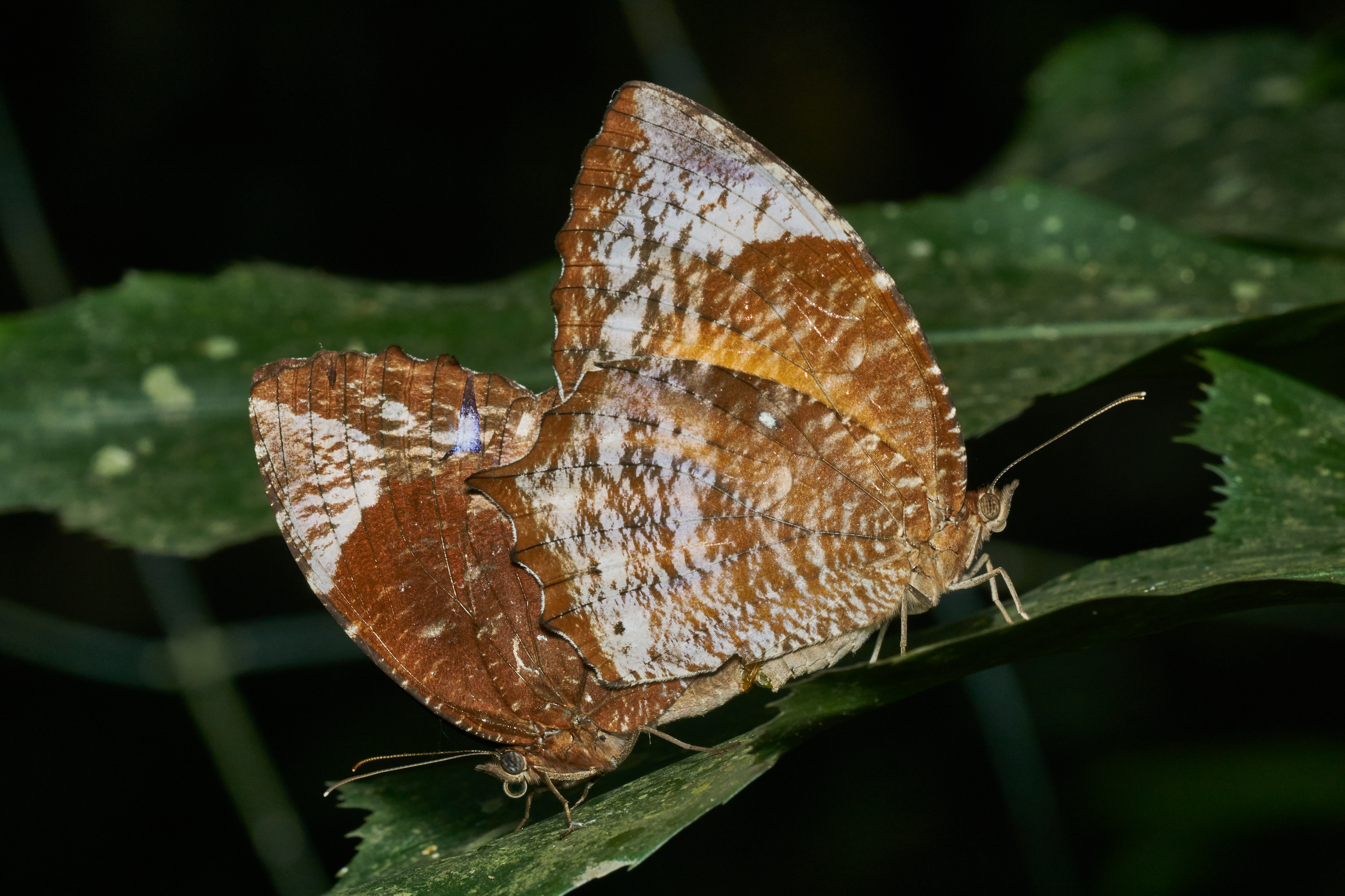
Mating pair

This butterfly species are sexually dimorphic: males and females do not look alike. Males have black upperside forewings with small blue patches and mimic Euploea species, while the females mimic butterfly species of the genus Danaus.

Both sexes have the wings longer, proportionately to their breadth, and the tail at apex of vein 4 on the hindwing longer compared to Elymnias hypermnestra.
Upperside: Male differs from E. hypermnestra as follows: the subterminal and preapical spots on the forewing white suffused slightly with dark scales; the terminal half of the hindwing tawny, more or less suffused with dusky black, which in some specimens forms a distinct border along the termen. Female similar to the female of E. hypermnestra, but the black more extended; veins 2, 3, and 4 on the hindwing broadly bordered with black.
Underside: Female differs from E. hypermnestra in the more conspicuous broadly triangular white pre-apical patch on the forewing, and in the prominence of the broad tawny terminal half of the upperside of the hindwing, which shows through a pale, sometimes pinkish brown on the underside. Antennae, head, thorax and abdomen brown, paler beneath and much paler in the female than in the male.

== Range ==
It is endemic to South India.

== Life history ==
=== Food plants ===
- Cocos nucifera
- Calamus pseudotenuis
- Calamus rotang
- Calamus thwaitesii
- Phoenix loureiroi
- Licuala grandis
- Areca catechu
- Arenga wightii
- Livistona chinensis
- Phoenix spp.
- Caryota urens
- Phoenix loureiroi
- Licuala chinensis

=== Larva ===
"Spindle-shaped, slender, transversely rugose and clothed with short stout bristles...; head large, surmounted by two stout horns, sloping backwards, slightly branched at the ends; a pair of long straight caudal spines setose like the body; colour bright green with longitudinal yellow lines more or less distinct and two rows of large yellow spots tinged with green and sometimes tipped with black on the back; head dark brown, with a yellow cheek-stripe and frontal-line."

=== Pupa ===
"Suspended by the tail only, but in a rigidly horizontal position, regular with the exception of two small pointed processes from the head and an acute thoracic projection above them; colour bright green, beautifully ornamented with four irregular rows of large yellow spots bordered with red." (Davidson & Aitken quoted by Bingham.)

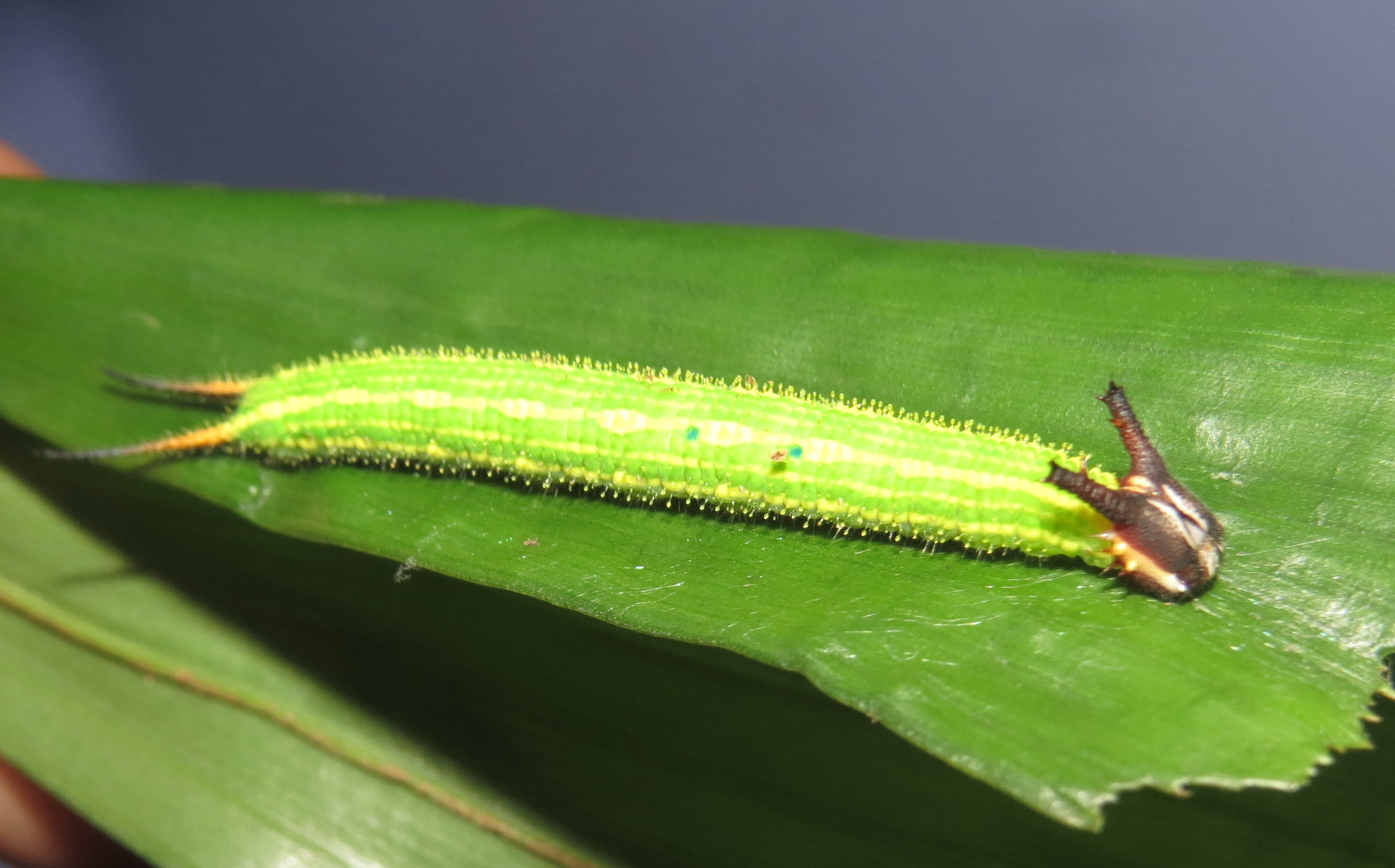
Larva

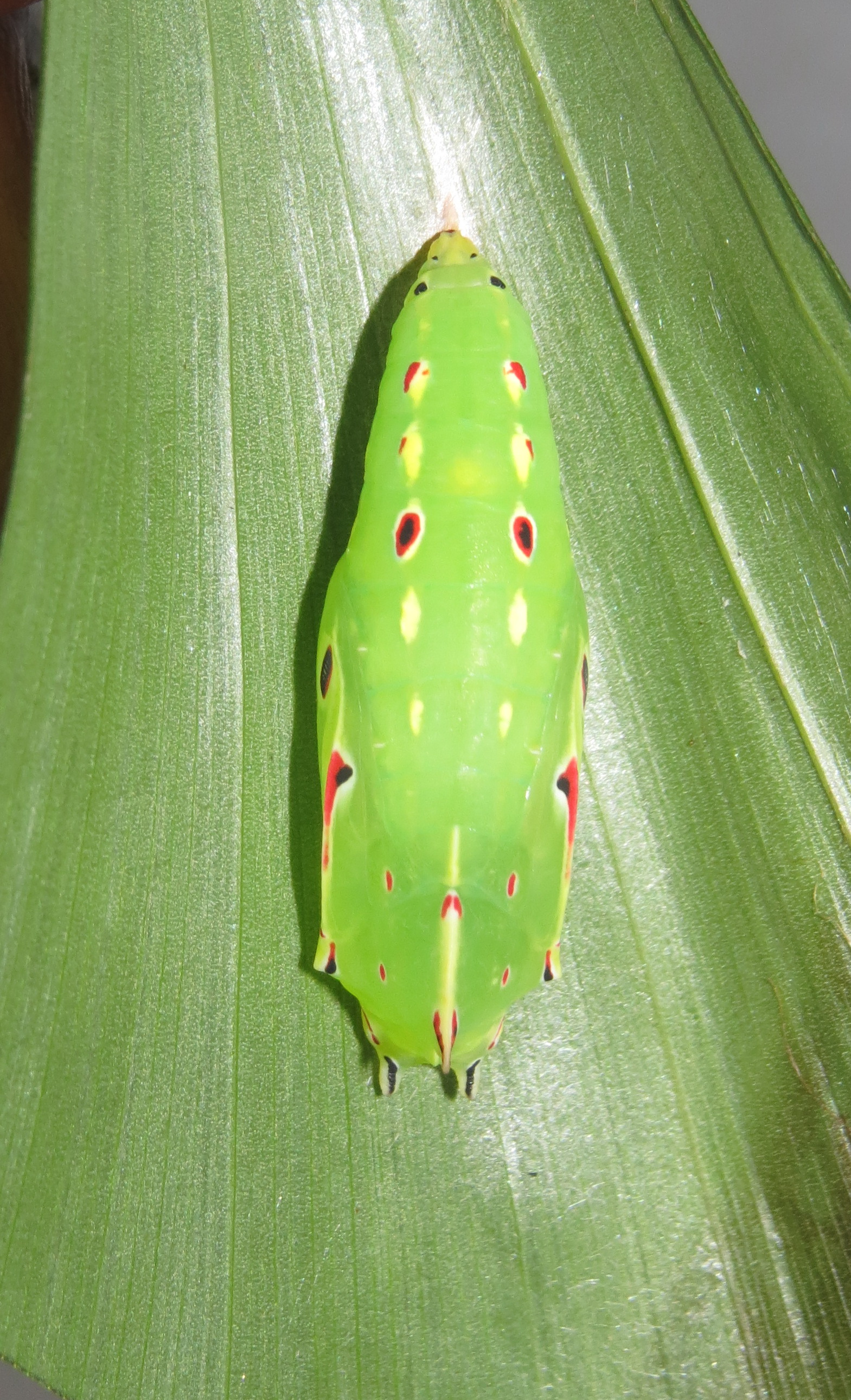
Pupa

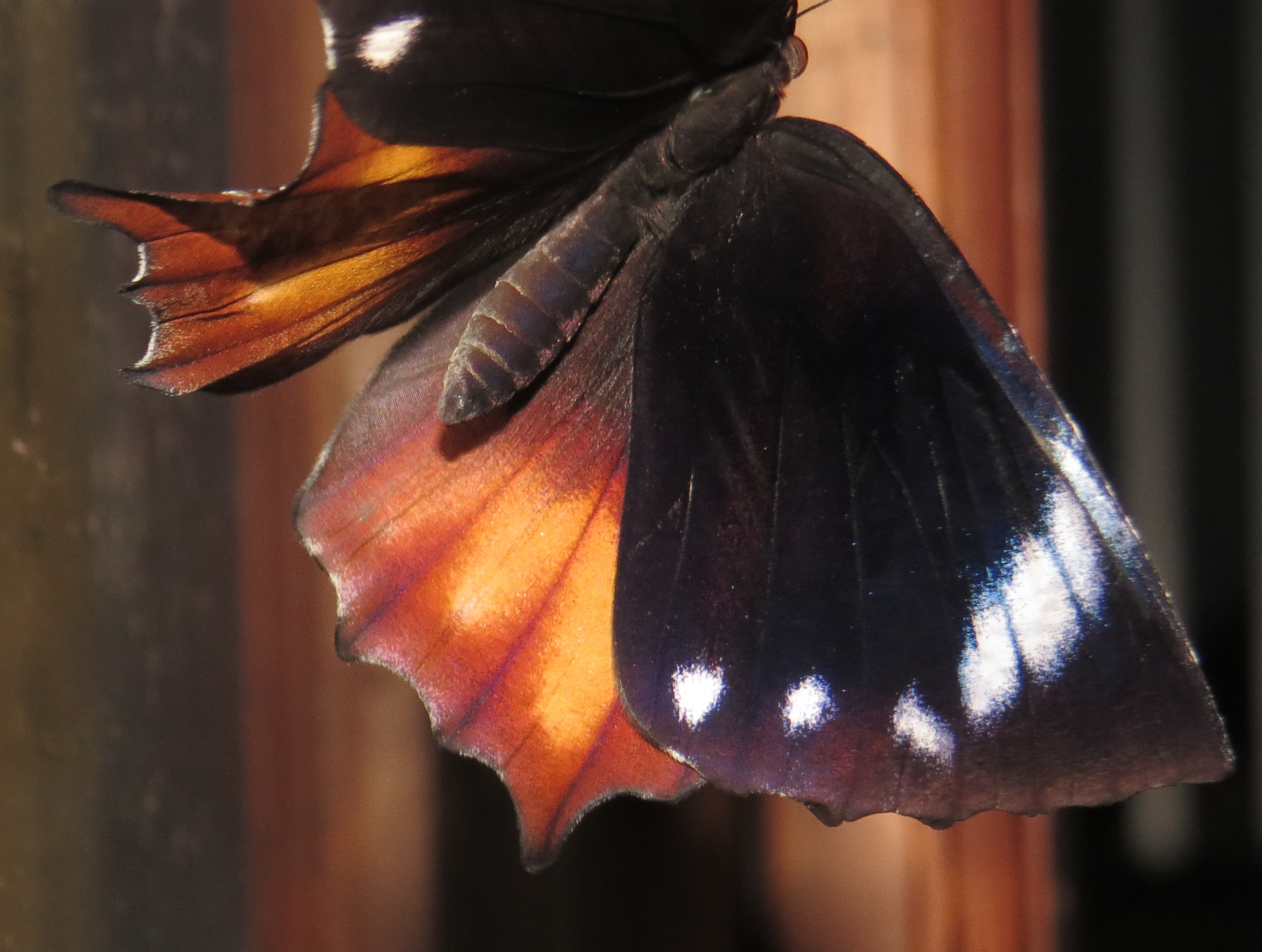
Male (upperside)

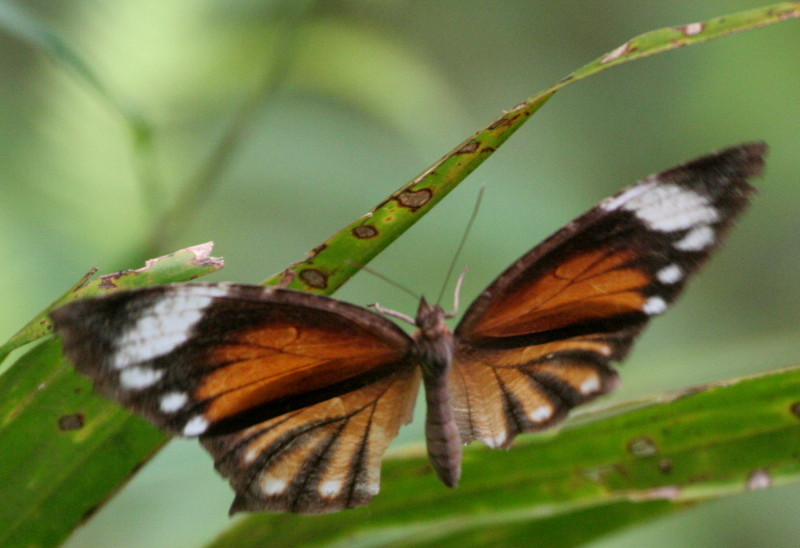
Female (upperside)

== See also ==
- List of butterflies of India
- List of butterflies of Kerala
