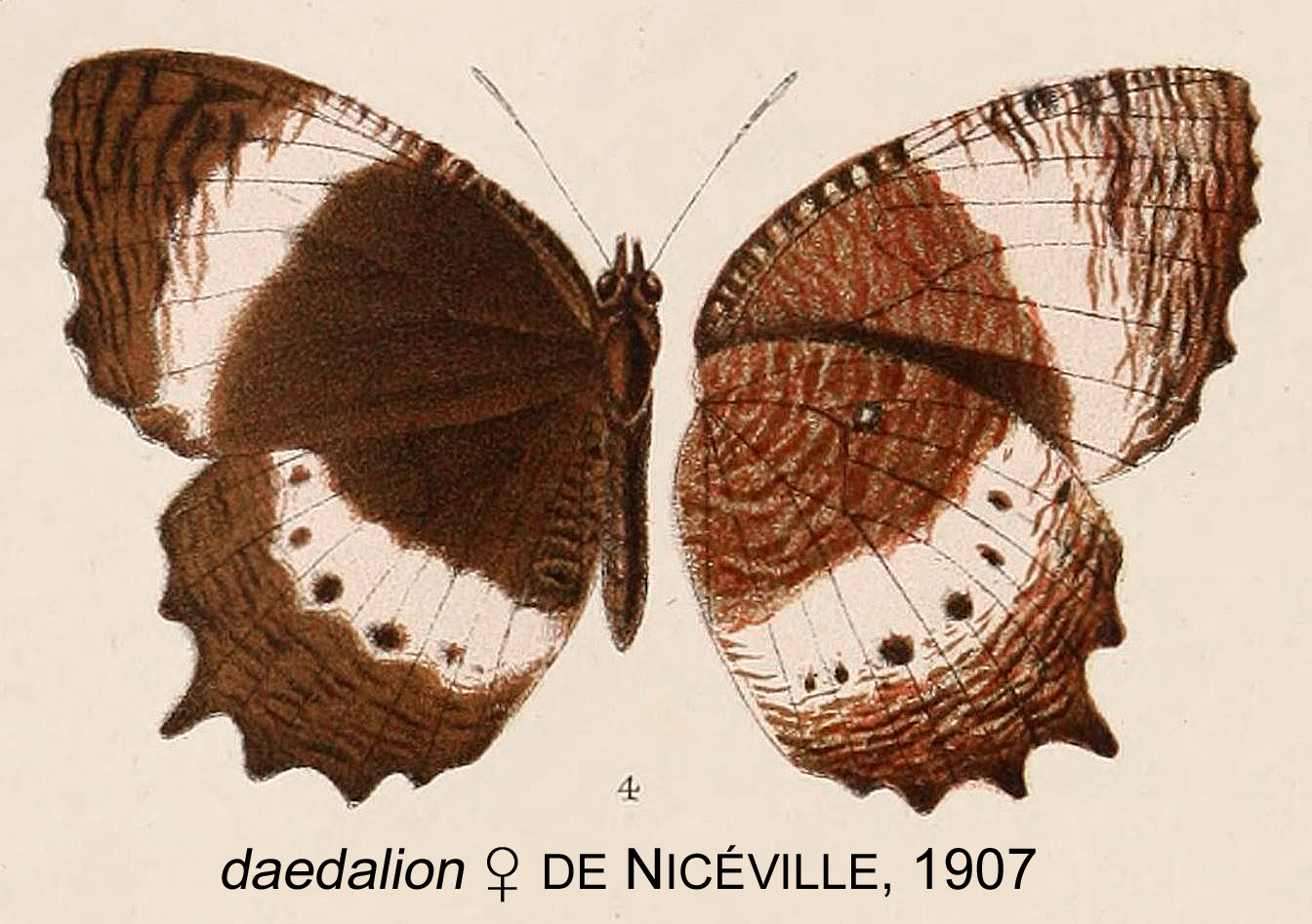
- Elymnias dara daedalion

Scientific classification
- Kingdom: Animalia
- Phylum: Arthropoda
- Clade: Pancrustacea
- Class: Insecta
- Order: Lepidoptera
- Family: Nymphalidae
- Genus: Elymnias
- Species: E. dara

Binomial name
- Elymnias dara Distant & Pryer, 1887
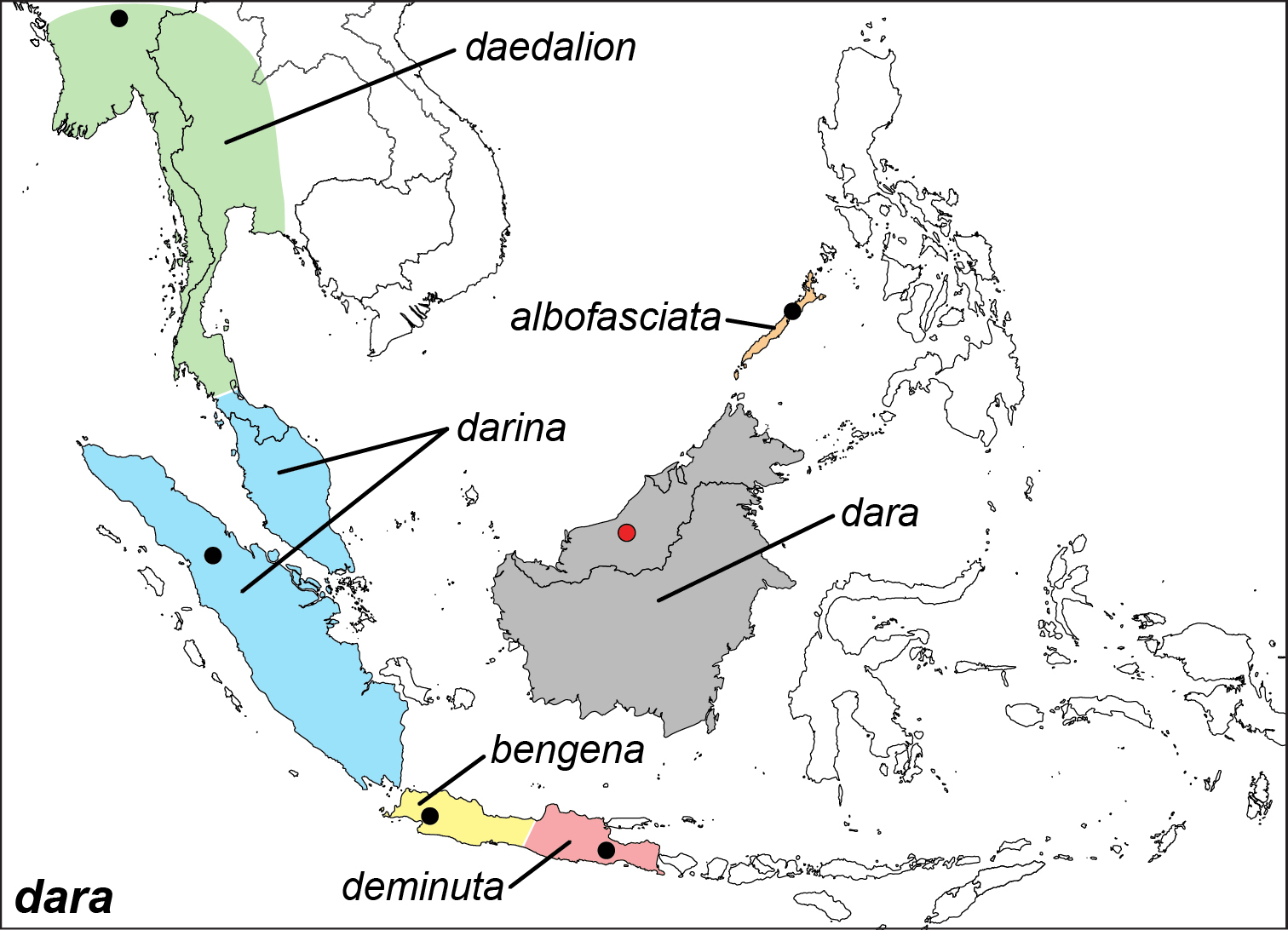

Synonyms
- Elymnias albofasciata Staudinger, 1889; Elymnias albofasciata var. deminuta Staudinger, 1889; Dyctis daedalion de Nicéville, 1890

= Elymnias dara =

Species of butterfly

Elymnias dara is a butterfly in the family Nymphalidae. It was described by William Burgess Pryer and William Lucas Distant in 1887. It is found in the Indomalayan realm.

== Subspecies ==
- E. d. dara (Borneo)
- E. d. albofasciata Staudinger, 1889 (Palawan)
- E. d. deminuta Staudinger, 1889 (East Java, Bali)
- E. d. bengena Fruhstorfer, 1907 (West Java)
- E. d. darina Fruhstorfer, 1907 (Sumatra, Peninsular Malaysia)
- E. d. daedalion (de Nicéville, 1890) (Burma: Tenasserim, Thailand)
