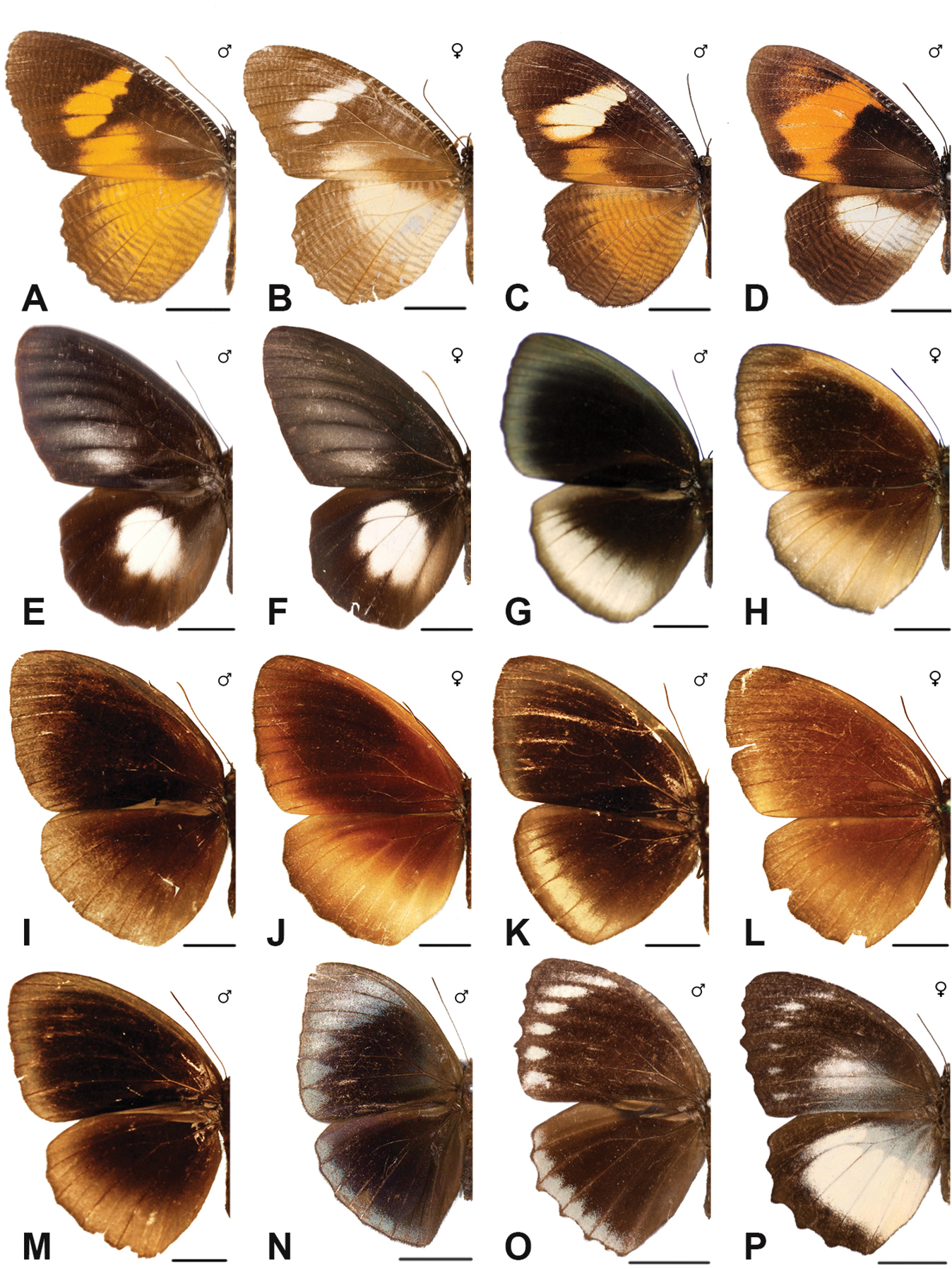
- Various wings of Elymnias species. E. paradoxa can be found in image E.

Scientific classification
- Kingdom: Animalia
- Phylum: Arthropoda
- Clade: Pancrustacea
- Class: Insecta
- Order: Lepidoptera
- Family: Nymphalidae
- Genus: Elymnias
- Species: E. paradoxa

Binomial name
- Elymnias paradoxa Staudinger, 1894
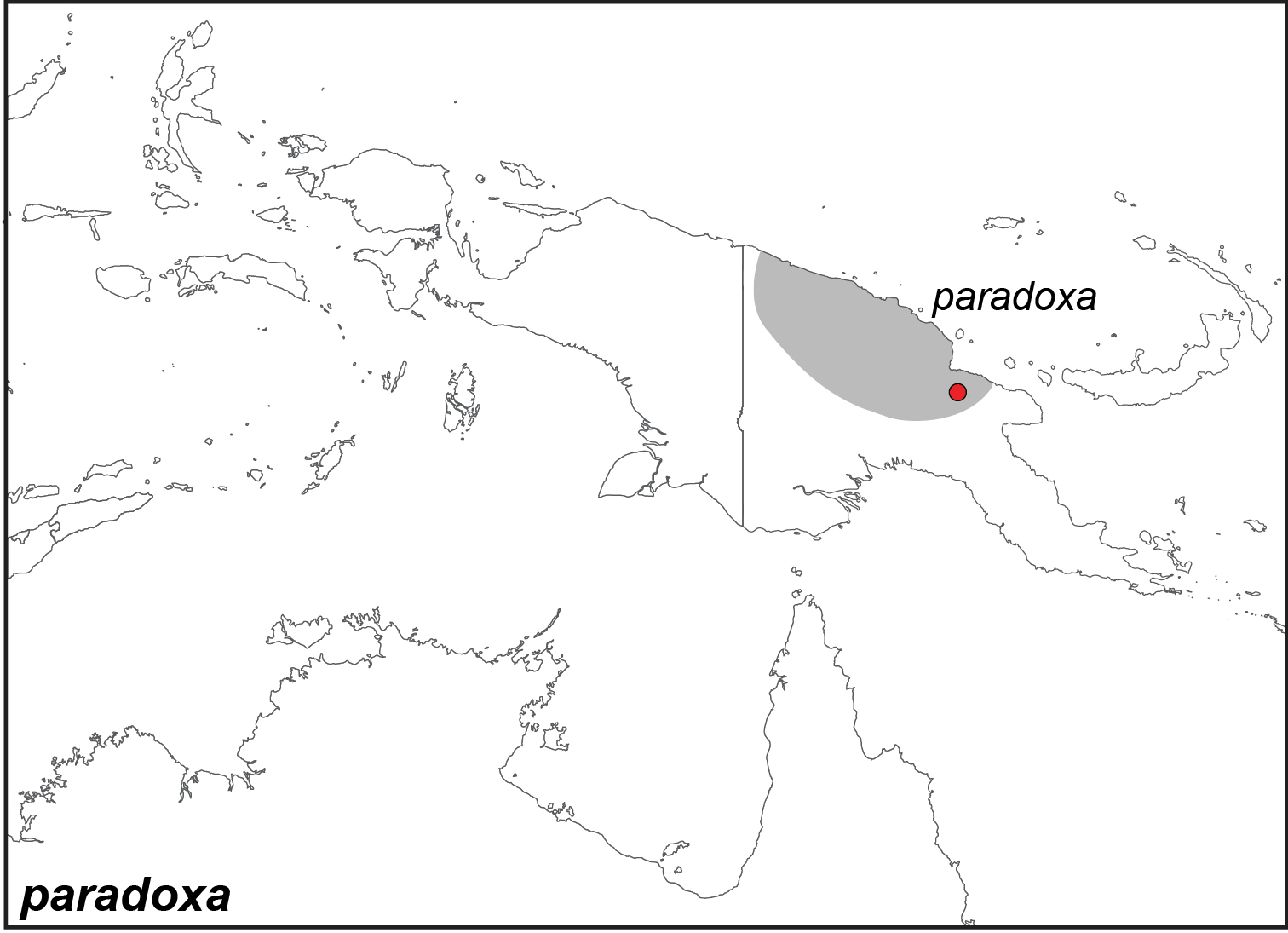
- Distribution map of Elymnias paradoxa.

= Elymnias paradoxa =

Species of butterfly

Elymnias paradoxa is a species of satyrid butterfly that belongs to the tribe Elymniini. The species can be found in the northern region of Papua New Guinea.

== Taxonomy ==
This species belongs to the genus Elymnias, a genus that is currently the sole member of the tribe Elymniini. It belongs to the paradoxa species-group and is the sole member of the group.
