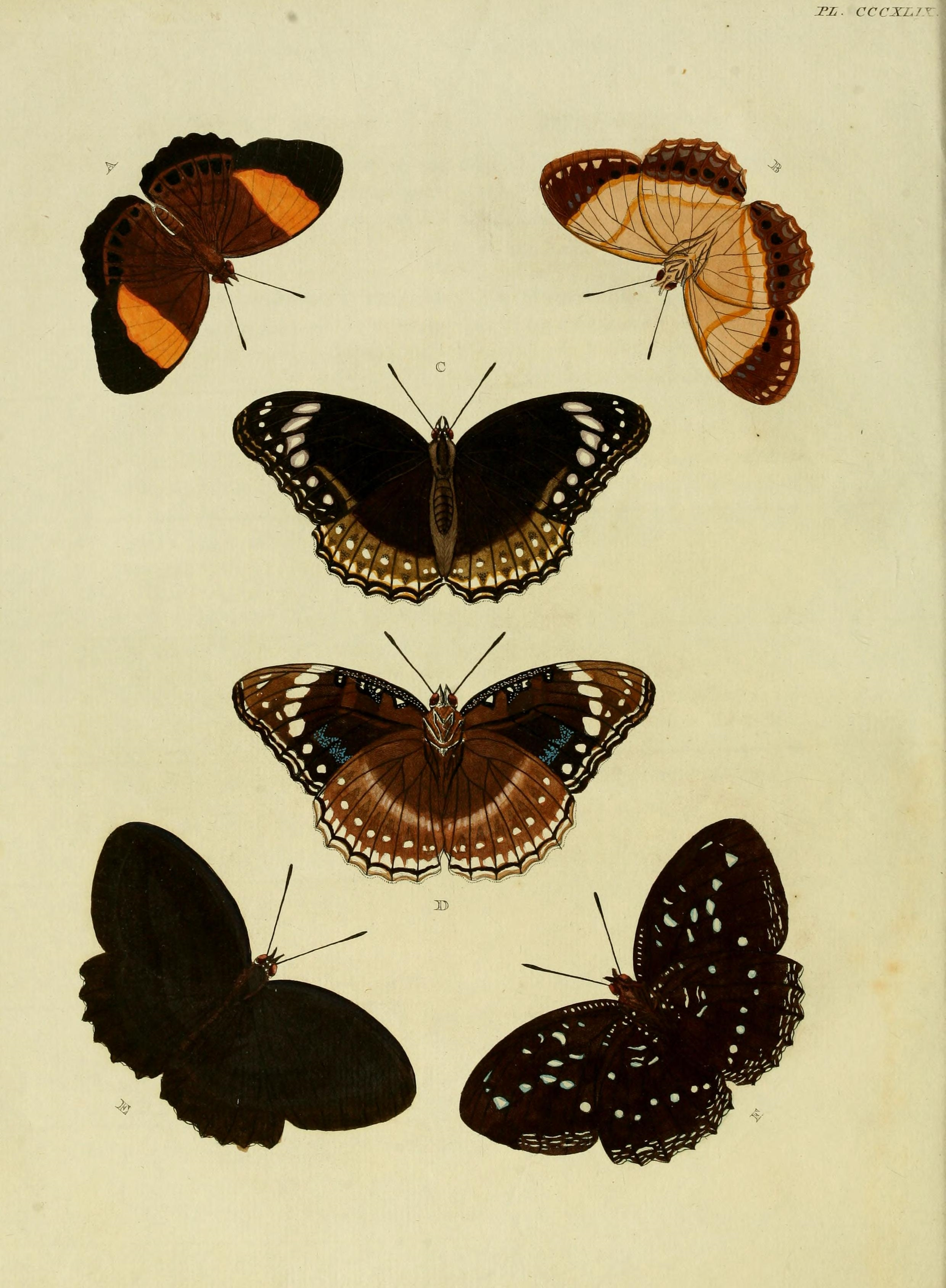
- From Pieter Cramer's De Uitlandsche Kapellen

Scientific classification
- Domain: Eukaryota
- Kingdom: Animalia
- Phylum: Arthropoda
- Class: Insecta
- Order: Lepidoptera
- Family: Nymphalidae
- Genus: Elymnias
- Species: E. vitellia

Binomial name
- Elymnias vitellia (Stoll, [1781])

Synonyms
- Papilio vitellia Stoll, [1781]; Elymnias vitellia ceramensis Martin, 1909; Elymnias viminalis Wallace, 1869

= Elymnias vitellia =

Species of butterfly

Elymnias vitellia is a butterfly in the family Nymphalidae. It was described by Caspar Stoll in 1781. It is found in the Indomalayan realm.

== Subspecies ==
- E. v. vitellia (Ambon, Saparua, Serang)
- E. v. viminalis Wallace, 1869 (Buru)
