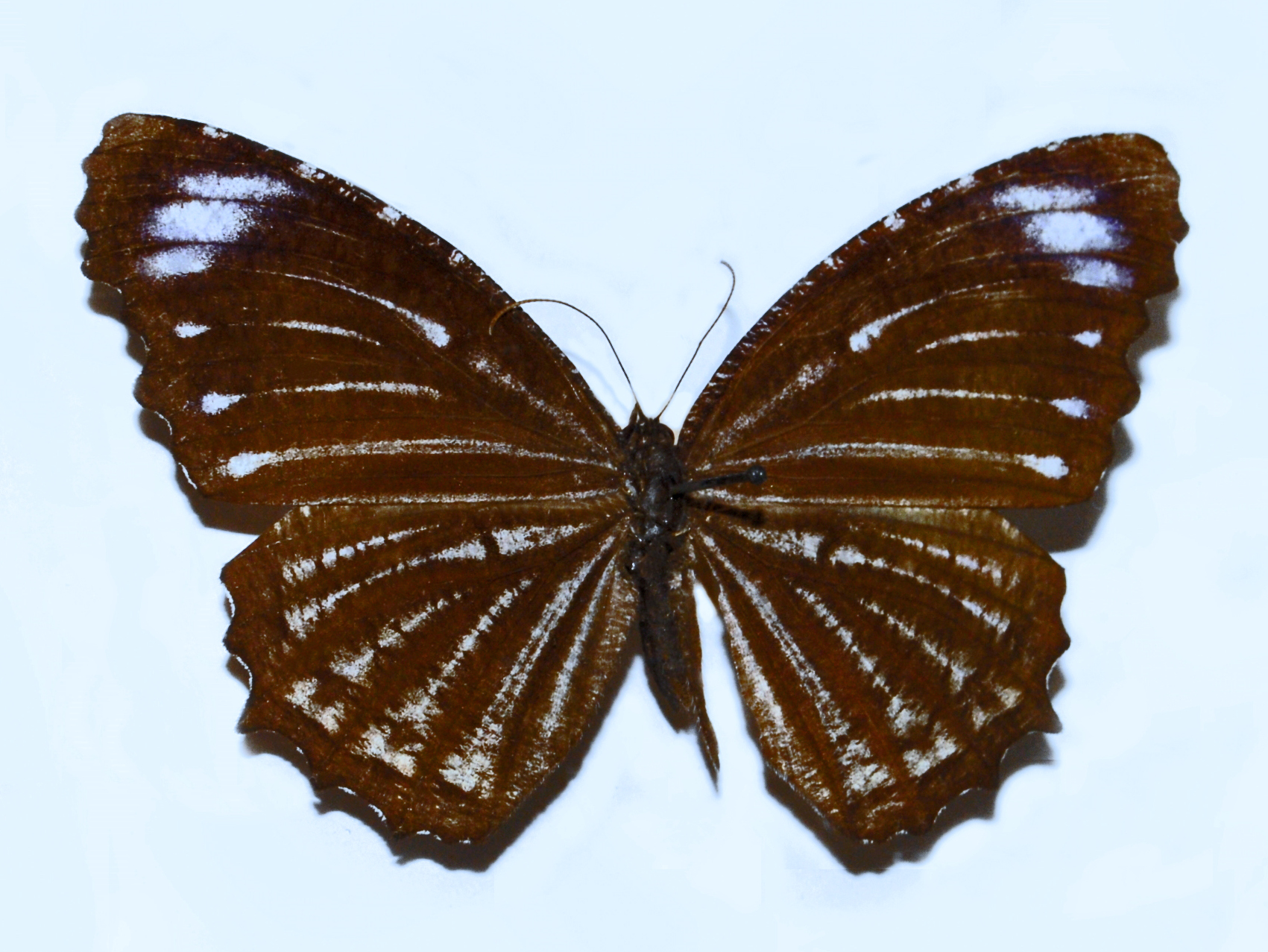

Scientific classification
- Kingdom: Animalia
- Phylum: Arthropoda
- Clade: Pancrustacea
- Class: Insecta
- Order: Lepidoptera
- Family: Nymphalidae
- Genus: Elymnias
- Species: E. nesaea

Binomial name
- Elymnias nesaea (Linnaeus, 1764)
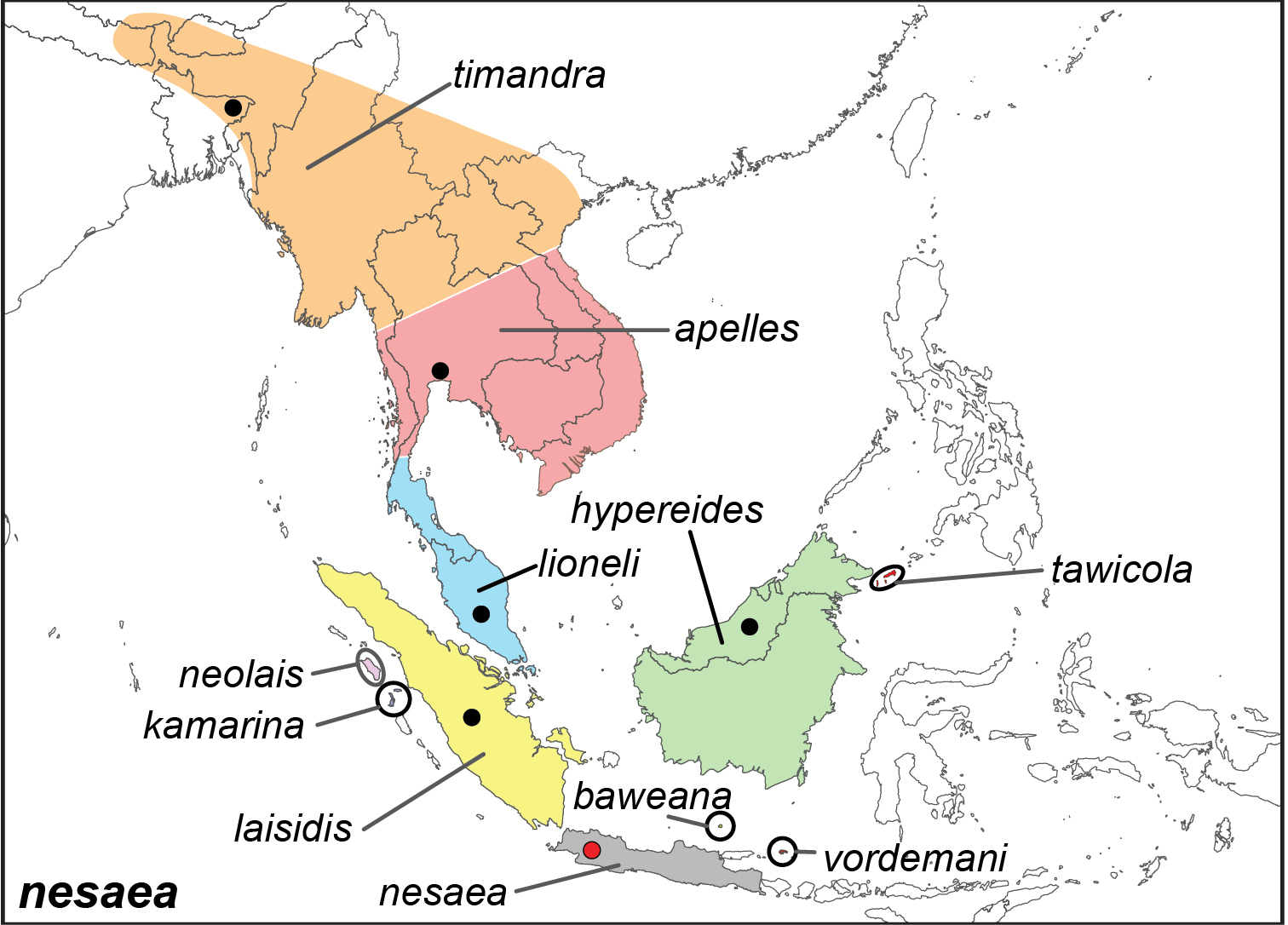

Synonyms
- Papilio nesaea Linnaeus, 1764; Elymnias timandra Wallace, 1869; Elymnias lais apelles Fruhstorfer, 1902; Elymnias (Melynias) neolais de Nicéville, 1898; Elymnias lais kamarina Fruhstorfer, 1906; Elymnias lais hypereides Fruhstorfer, 1903; Elymnias baweana Hagen, 1896; Elymnias vordemani Snellen, 1902

= Elymnias nesaea =

Species of butterfly

Elymnias nesaea, the tiger palmfly, is a butterfly in the family Nymphalidae.

== Subspecies ==
- Elymnias nesaea nesaea - W.Java
- Elymnias nesaea timandra Wallace, 1869 - Sikkim, Assam, northern Thailand, Laos, Yunnan
- Elymnias nesaea cortona Fruhstorfer, 1911 - Burma
- Elymnias nesaea apelles Fruhstorfer, 1902 - Thailand, lower Burma, southern Yunnan
- Elymnias nesaea lioneli Fruhstorfer, 1907 – Peninsular Malaya
- Elymnias nesaea laisides de Nicéville, 1896 - Sumatra
- Elymnias nesaea neolais de Nicéville, 1898 - Nias
- Elymnias nesaea kamarina Fruhstorfer, 1906 - Batu Islands
- Elymnias nesaea hypereides Fruhstorfer, 1903 - northern Borneo
- Elymnias nesaea coelifrons Fruhstorfer, 1907 - southern Borneo
- Elymnias nesaea hermia Fruhstorfer, 1907 - eastern Java
- Elymnias nesaea baweana Hagen, 1896 – Bawean
- Elymnias nesaea vordemani Snellen, 1902 - Kangean Islands

== Description ==
Elymnias nesaea has a wingspan of about 65–85 millimetres (2.6–3.3 in). The upperside of the wings is black with long bluish-green streaks. Forewings show four or five spots on the apical area, while hindwings have subterminal whitish spots in the posterior interspaces. The underside has a broad dark brown area on both wings. In females, the undersides are white with brown or yellowish shading.

The adult mimics Danaus aglea.

The larva feeds on various Arecaceae species, mainly on Calamus species, Trachycarpus forturei Cyrtostachys lakka, Cocos nucifera and Ptychosperma macarthurii.

== Distribution ==
This species can be found in India, Thailand, Laos, Burma, Peninsular Malaya, Java, Sumatra and Borneo. Bhutan.
