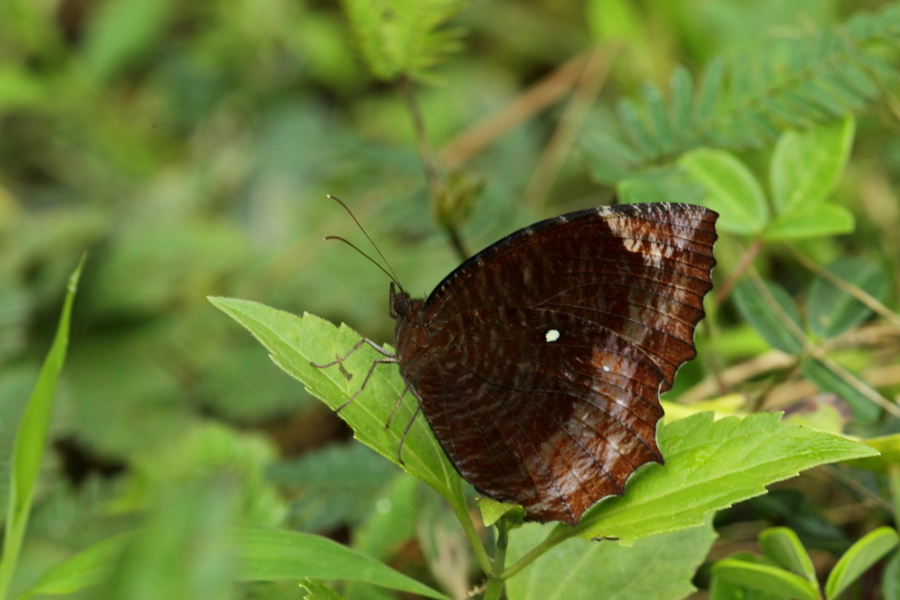

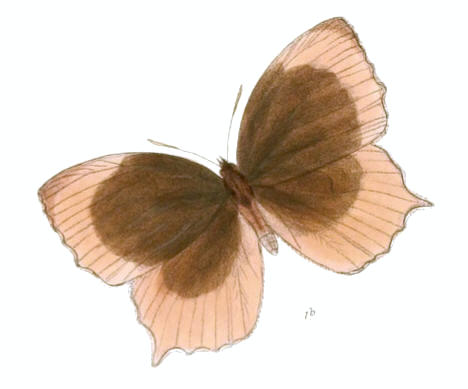

Scientific classification
- Kingdom: Animalia
- Phylum: Arthropoda
- Clade: Pancrustacea
- Class: Insecta
- Order: Lepidoptera
- Family: Nymphalidae
- Genus: Elymnias
- Species: E. obnubila

Binomial name
- Elymnias obnubila Marshall & de Nicéville, 1883

= Elymnias obnubila =

Species of butterfly

Elymnias obnubila is a butterfly in the family Nymphalidae. It was described by Lionel de Nicéville and George Frederick Leycester Marshall in 1883. It is endemic to Burma in the Indomalayan realm.
