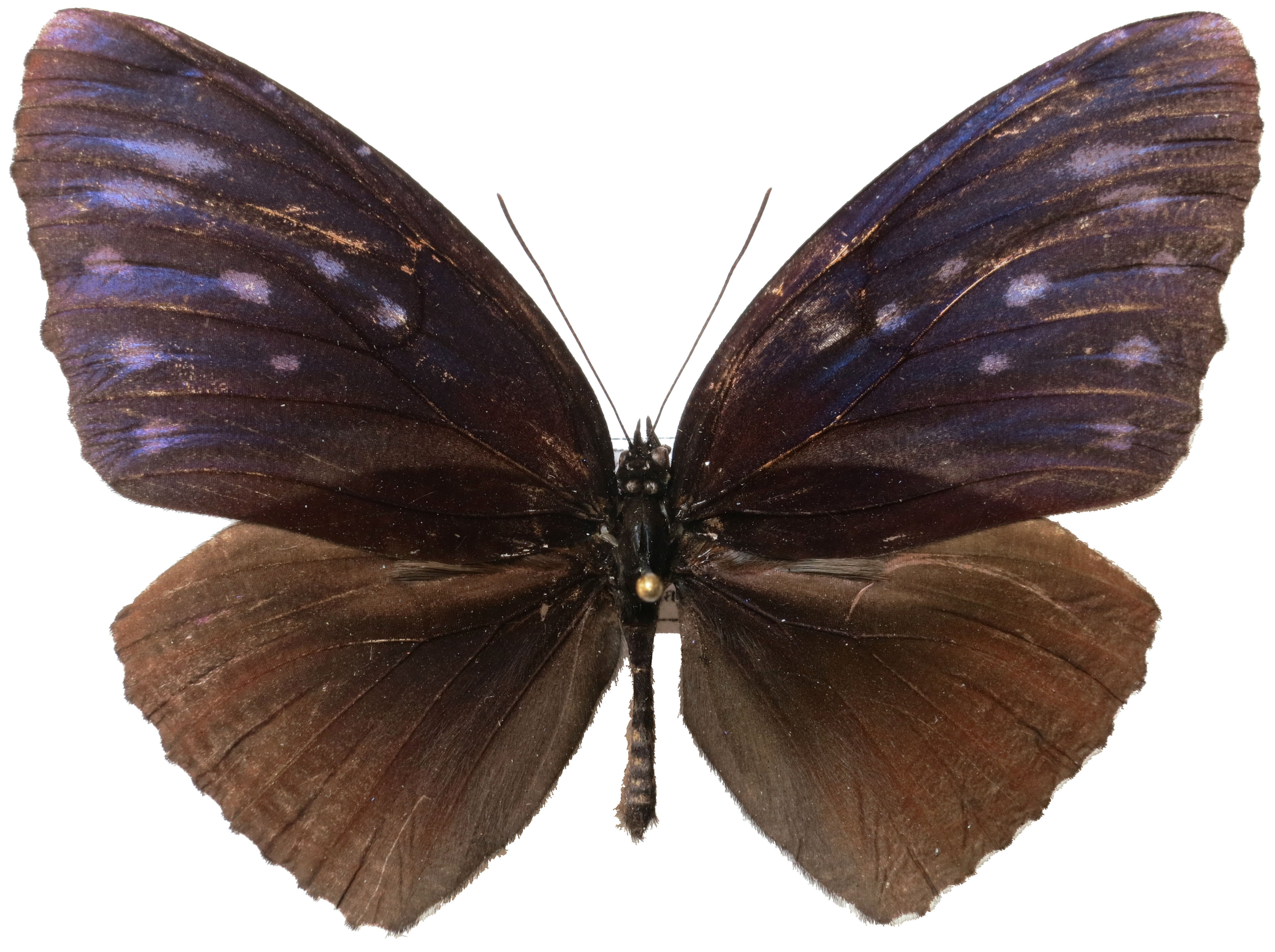
- E. malelas male - Ko Chang, Thailand
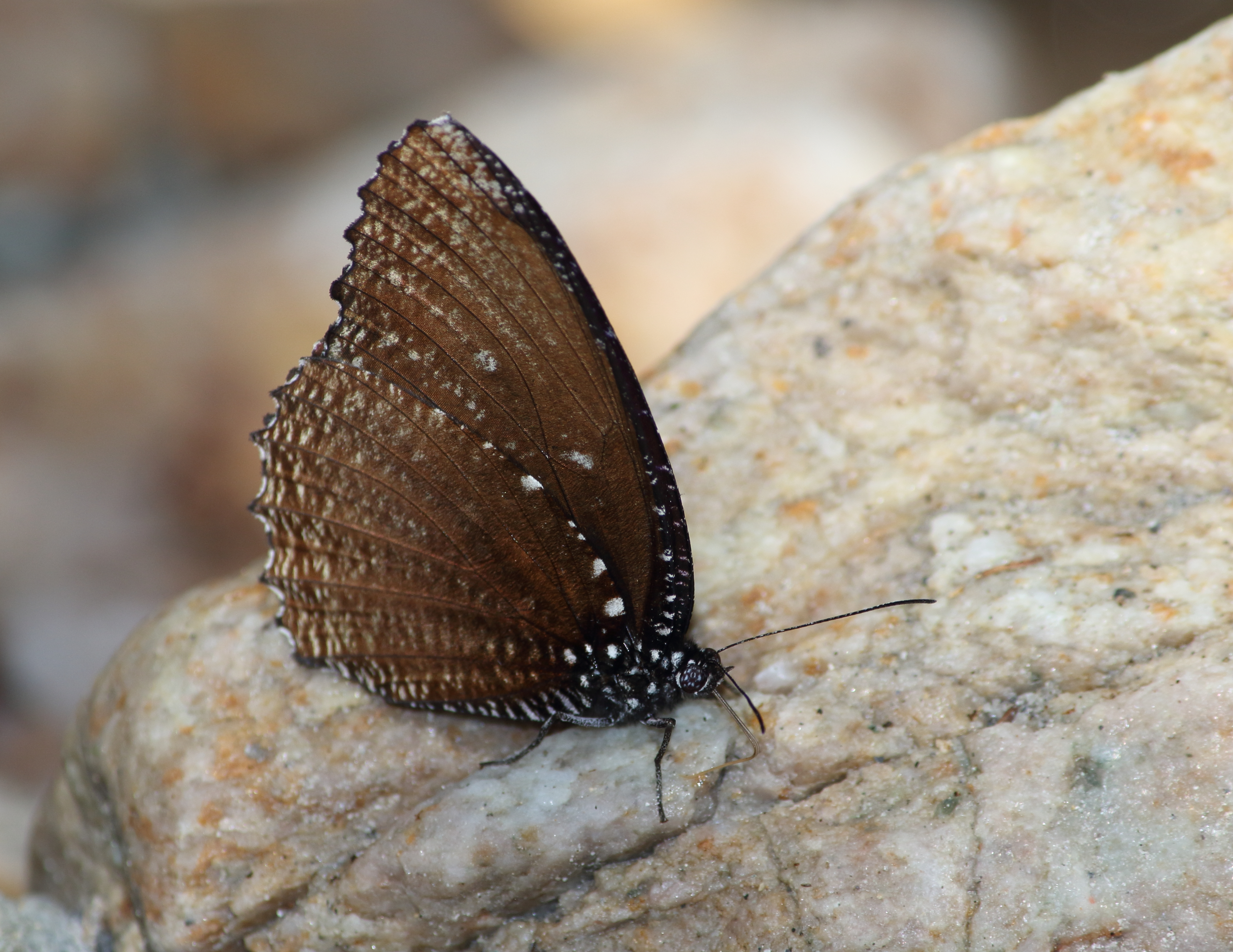
- Elymnias malelas malelas in West Bengal, India

Scientific classification
- Kingdom: Animalia
- Phylum: Arthropoda
- Clade: Pancrustacea
- Class: Insecta
- Order: Lepidoptera
- Family: Nymphalidae
- Genus: Elymnias
- Species: E. malelas

Binomial name
- Elymnias malelas (Hewitson, 1863)

Synonyms
- Melanitis malelas Hewitson, 1863; Biblis leucocyma Godart, 1819; Elymnias malelas malelas ab. subdecorata Fruhstorfer, 1911

= Elymnias malelas =

Species of butterfly

Elymnias malelas, the spotted palmfly, is a butterfly in the family Nymphalidae. It was described by William Chapman Hewitson in 1863. It is found in northern India and Indochina in the Indomalayan realm.

== Subspecies ==
- E. m. malelas (northern India, Sikkim)
- E. m. ivena Fruhstorfer, 1911 (southern Yunnan, Thailand, Vietnam)

== Biology ==
Larvae feed on Trachycarpus fortunei and Musa paradisiaca. The butterfly mimics Euploea mulciber.
