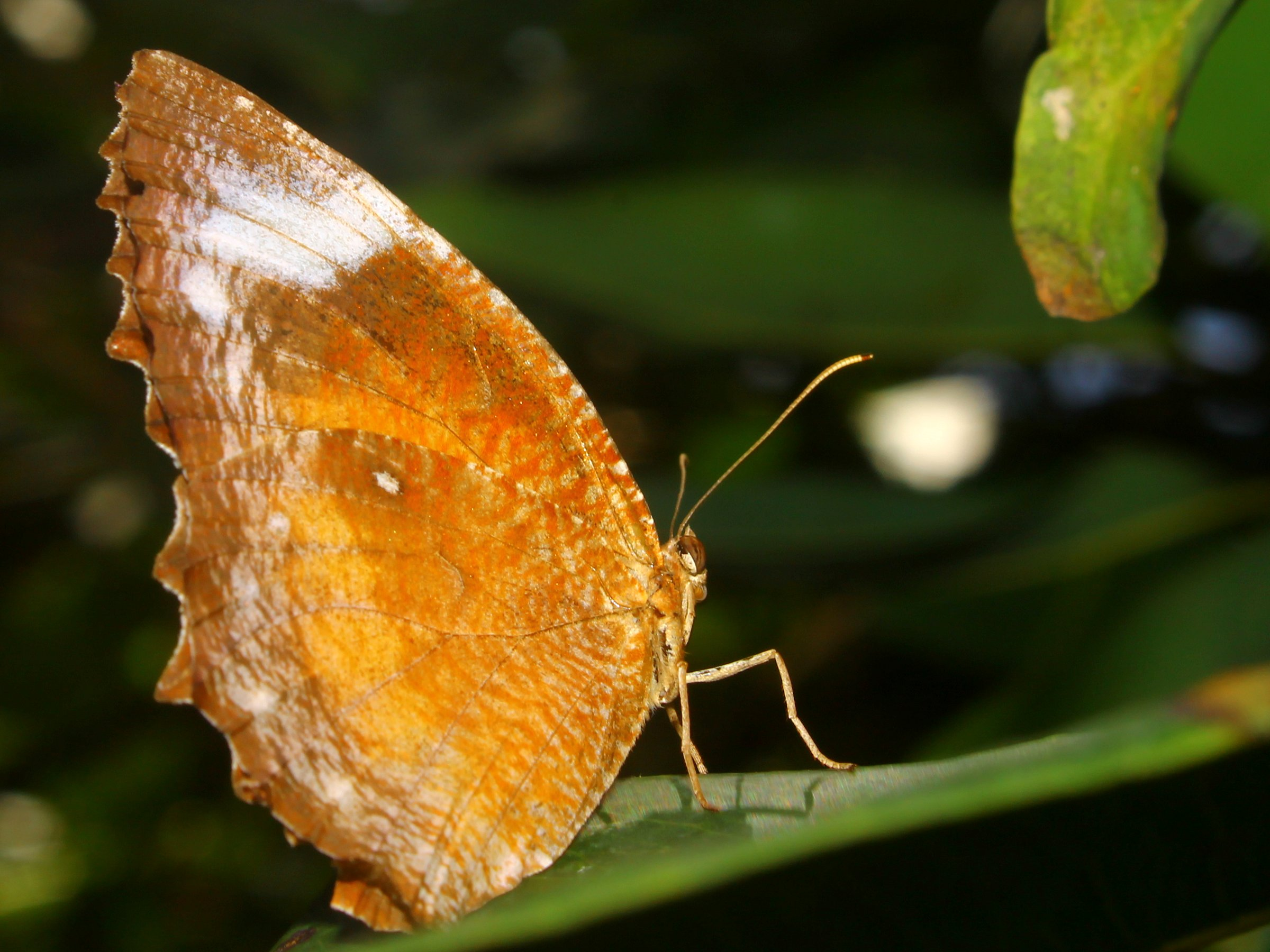

Scientific classification
- Kingdom: Animalia
- Phylum: Arthropoda
- Clade: Pancrustacea
- Class: Insecta
- Order: Lepidoptera
- Family: Nymphalidae
- Genus: Elymnias
- Species: E. panthera

Binomial name
- Elymnias panthera (Fabricius, 1787)

Synonyms
- Papilio panthera Fabricius, 1787; Elymnias panthera exsulata van Eecke, 1918; Elymnias lutescens Butler, 1867; Melanitis dusara Horsfield, [1829]; Elymnias panthera f. dulcibella Fruhstorfer, 1907; Elymnias panthera balina Martin, 1909; Elymnias panthera var. labuana Staudinger, 1889; Elymnias panthera alfredi f. alfredi Fruhstorfer, 1907; Elymnias panthera alfredi f. pantherina Fruhstorfer, 1907; Elymnias dolorosa var. enganica Doherty, 1891; Elymnias dolorosa Butler, 1883; Elymnias mimus Wood-Mason & de Nicéville, 1881

= Elymnias panthera =

Species of butterfly

Elymnias panthera, the tawny palmfly, is a butterfly in the family Nymphalidae. It was described by Johan Christian Fabricius in 1787. It is found in the Indomalayan realm.

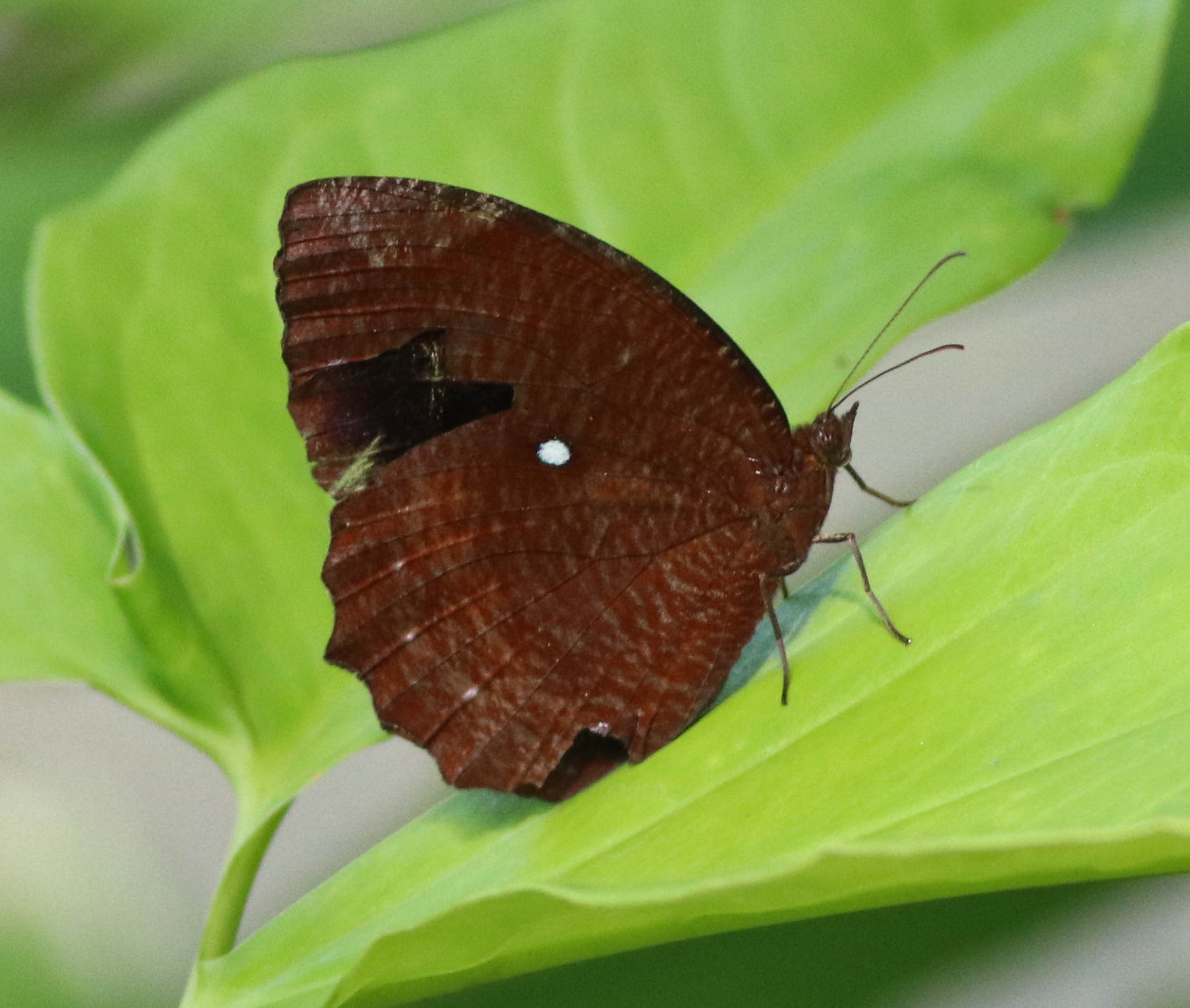

== Subspecies ==
- Elymnias panthera panthera (Peninsular Malaysia, Singapore)
- Elymnias panthera dusara Horsfield, [1829] (western Java)
- Elymnias panthera dulcibella Fruhstorfer, 1907 (eastern Java)
- Elymnias panthera balina Martin, 1909 (Bali)
- Elymnias panthera lacrimosa Fruhstorfer, 1898 (Bawean)
- Elymnias panthera lacrima Fruhstorfer, 1904 (Borneo)
- Elymnias panthera tautra Fruhstorfer, 1907 (Sumatra)
- Elymnias panthera arikata Fruhstorfer, 1907 (Natuna)
- Elymnias panthera labuana Staudinger, 1889 (northern Borneo)
- Elymnias panthera alfredi Fruhstorfer, 1907 (southern Borneo)
- Elymnias panthera parce Staudinger, 1889 (Palawan)
- Elymnias panthera suluana Fruhstorfer, 1899 (Sulu)
- Elymnias panthera bangueyana Fruhstorfer, 1899 (Banggai)
- Elymnias panthera enganica Doherty, 1891 (Enggano)
- Elymnias panthera dolorosa Butler, 1883 (Nias)
- Elymnias panthera mimus Wood-Mason & de Nicéville, 1881 (Nicobars)
- Elymnias panthera tiomanica Eliot, 1978 (Pulau Tioman)
- Elymnias panthera winkleri Kalis, 1933 (Sabang)
