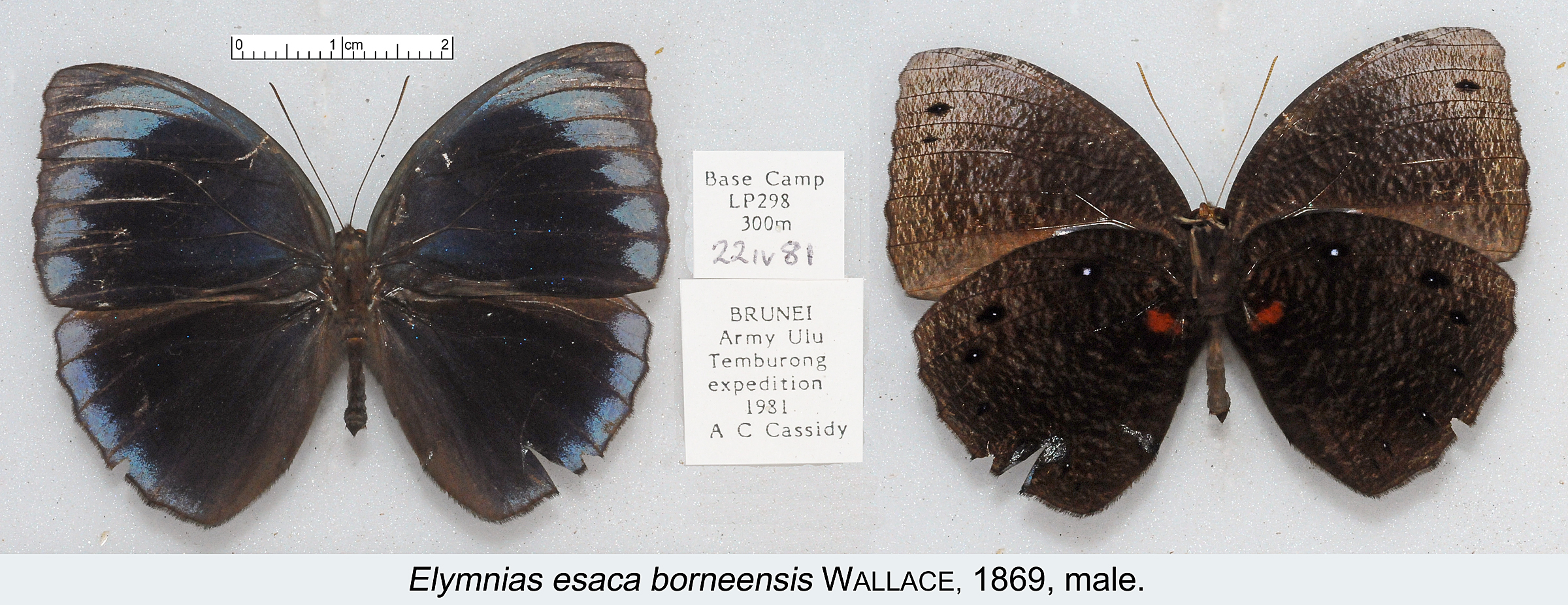
- Elymnias esaca borneensis

Scientific classification
- Kingdom: Animalia
- Phylum: Arthropoda
- Clade: Pancrustacea
- Class: Insecta
- Order: Lepidoptera
- Family: Nymphalidae
- Genus: Elymnias
- Species: E. esaca

Binomial name
- Elymnias esaca (Westwood, 1851)
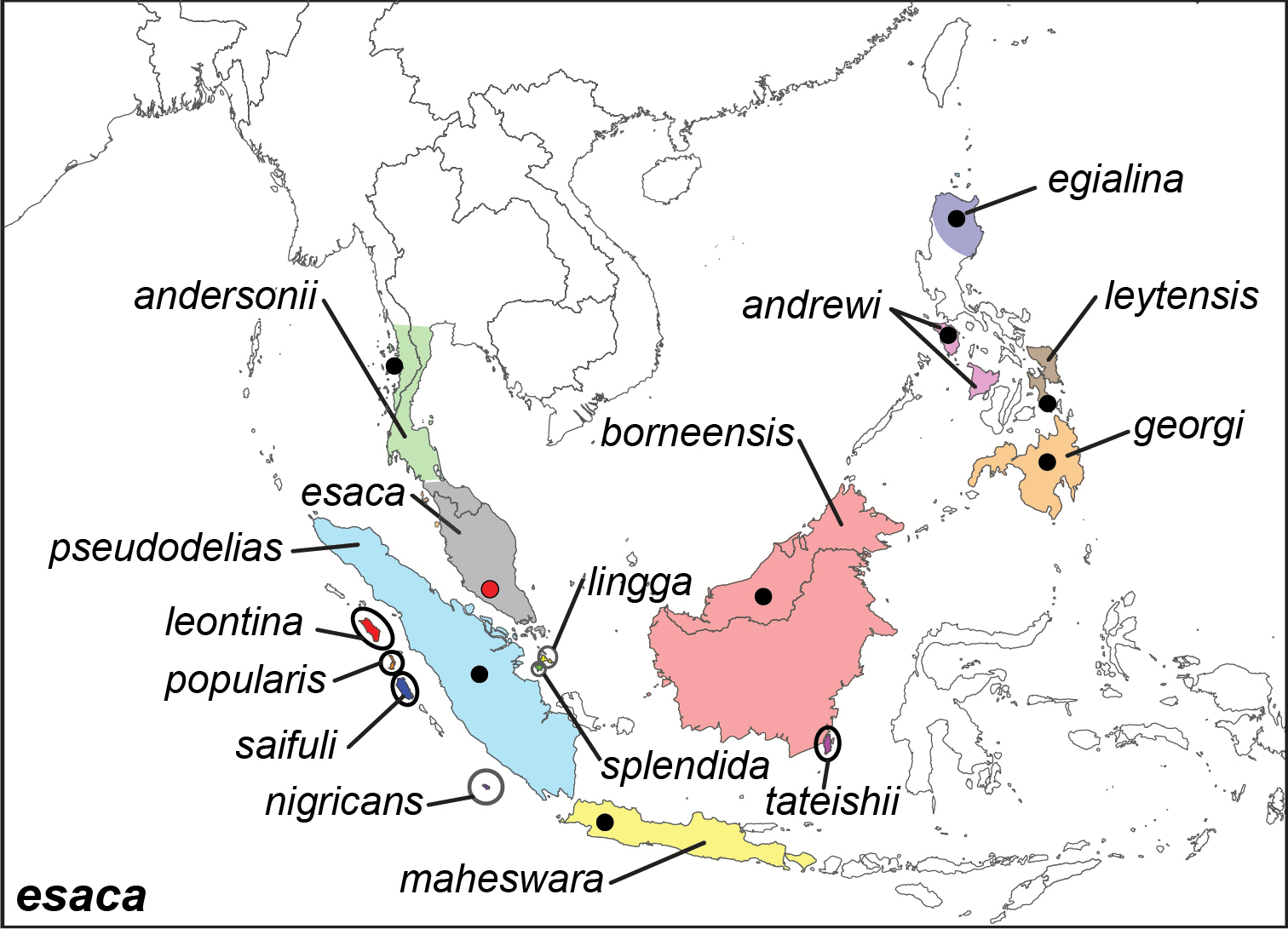

Synonyms
- Melanitis esaca Westwood, 1851; Elymnias godferyi Distant, 1883; Dyctis esacoides de Nicéville, [1893]; Melanitis egialina C. & R. Felder, 1863; Elymnias borneensis Wallace, 1869; Dyctis andersonii Moore, 1886; Elymnias (Dyctis) maheswara Fruhstorfer, 1894

= Elymnias esaca =

Species of butterfly

Elymnias esaca is a butterfly in the family Nymphalidae. It was described by John Obadiah Westwood in 1851. It is found in the Indomalayan realm.

== Subspecies ==
- E. e. esaca (Peninsular Malaysia, Singapore)
- E. e. egialina (C. & R. Felder, 1863) (Philippines: Luzon, Mindoro)
- E. e. borneensis Wallace, 1869 (North Borneo)
- E. e. andersonii (Moore, 1886) (South Burma: Mergui)
- E. e. maheswara Fruhstorfer, 1895 (Java, Bali)
- E. e. leontina Fruhstorfer, 1898 (Nias)
- E. e. pseudodelias Fruhstorfer, 1907 (Sumatra)
- E. e. taeniola Fruhstorfer, 1907 (Southeast Borneo)
- E. e. georgi Fruhstorfer, 1907 (Philippines: Mindanao)
- E. e. saifuli Hanafusa, 1994 (Siberut)
- E. e. popularis Hanafusa, 1994 (Tanahmasa)
- E. e. lautensis Tateishi, 2001 (Laut Island)
- E. e. splendida Tateishi, 2001 (Singkep Island)
- E. e. lingga Tateishi, 2001 (Lingga Island)
- E. e. nigricans Tateishi, 2001 (Enggano Island)
- E. e. tateishii Lamas, 2010 (Laut Island)
