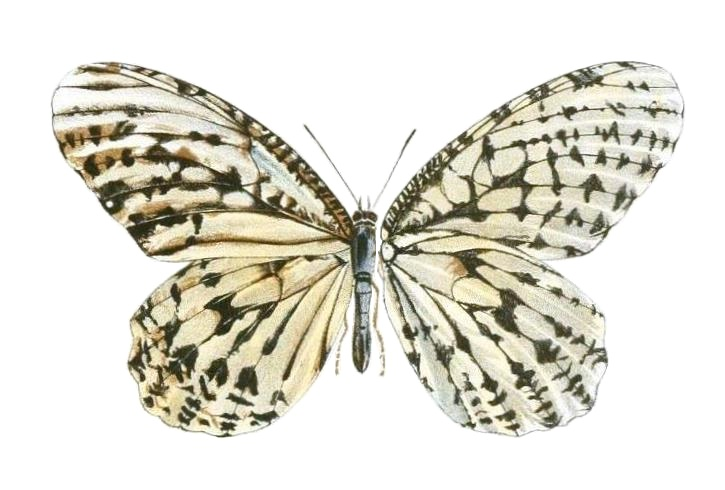

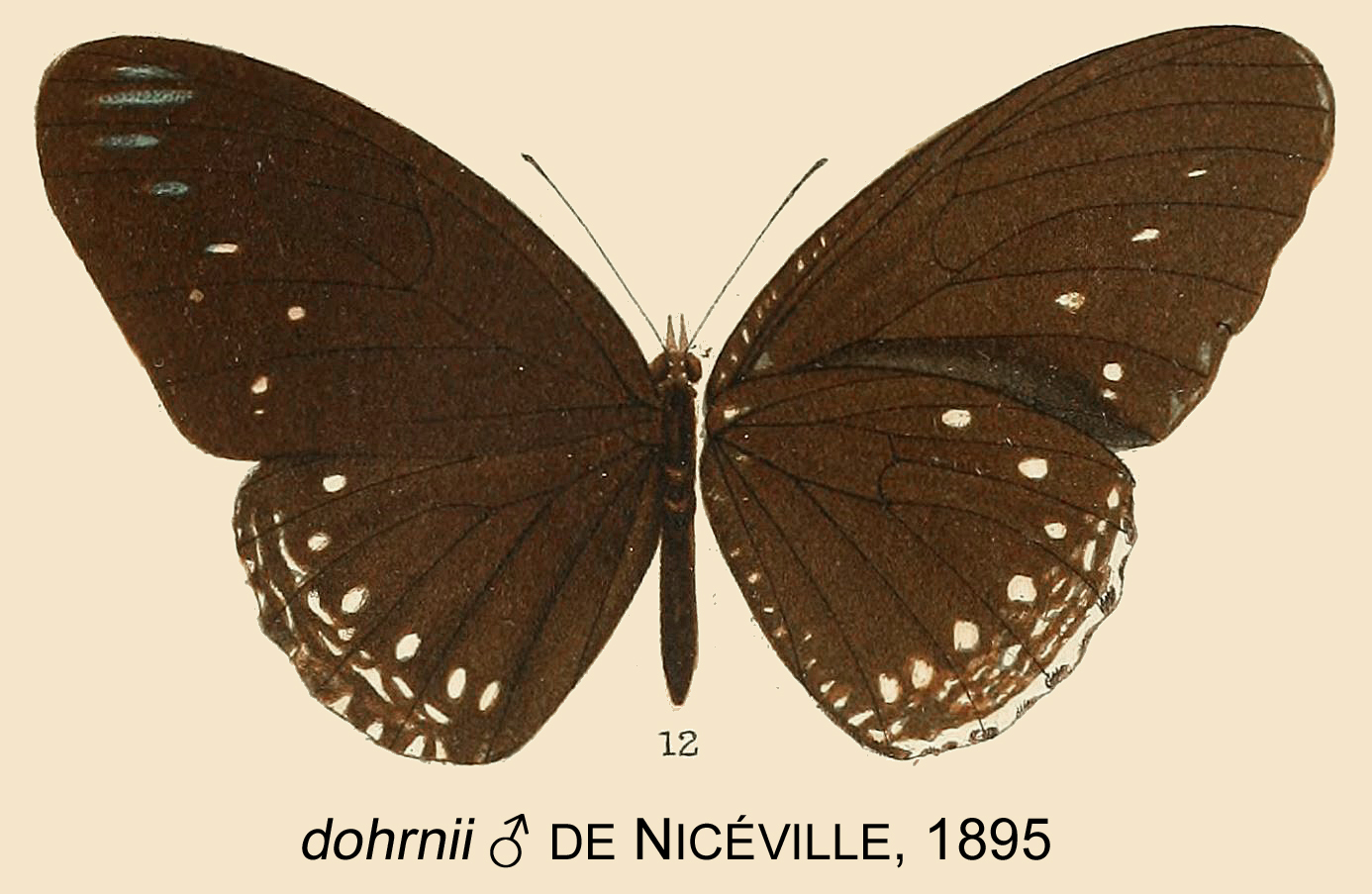
- Nominate subsp. and E. k. dohrnii

Scientific classification
- Kingdom: Animalia
- Phylum: Arthropoda
- Clade: Pancrustacea
- Class: Insecta
- Order: Lepidoptera
- Family: Nymphalidae
- Genus: Elymnias
- Species: E. kuenstleri

Binomial name
- Elymnias kuenstleri Honrath, 1885
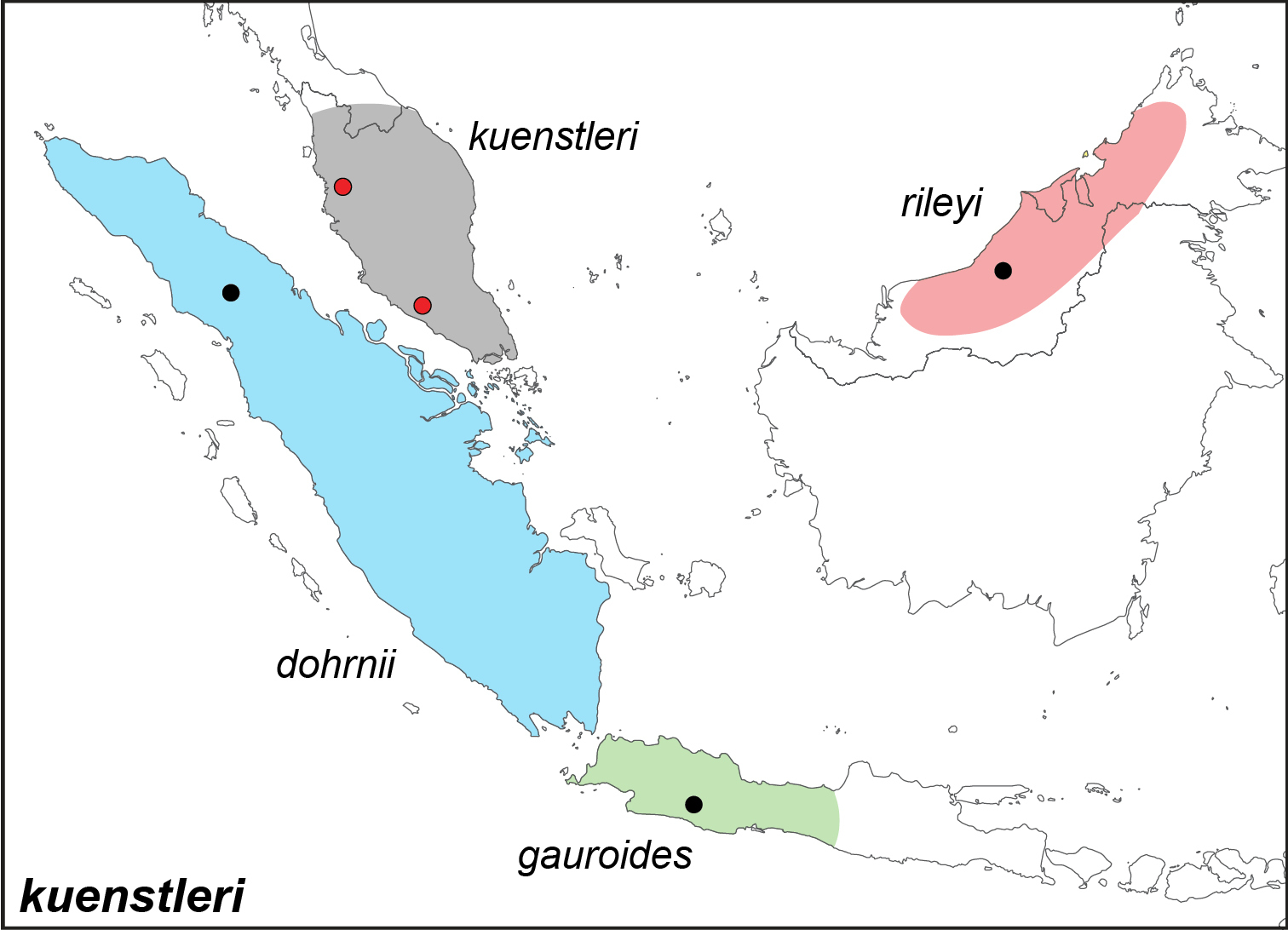

Synonyms
- borneensis Riley, 1923; Elymnias gauroides Fruhstorfer, 1894

= Elymnias kuenstleri =

Species of butterfly

Elymnias kuenstleri is a butterfly in the family Nymphalidae. It was described by Eduard Honrath in 1885. It is found in the Indomalayan realm.

== Subspecies ==
- E. k. kuenstleri — Peninsular Malaysia
- E. k. rileyi Corbet, 1933 — Borneo
- E. k. gauroides Fruhstorfer, 1894 — Java
- E. k. dohrnii de Nicéville, 1895 — North Sumatra: Bohorok
