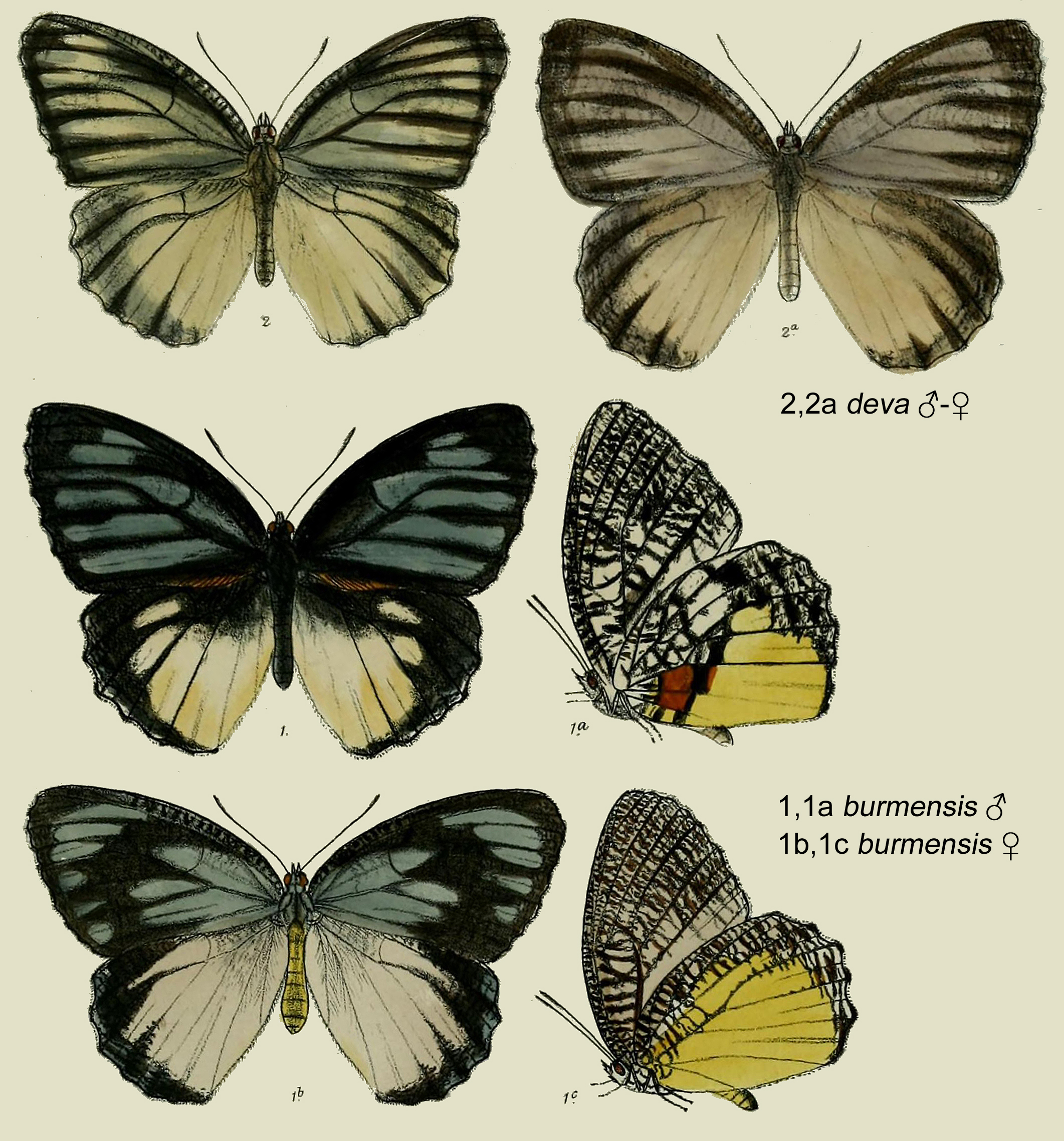
- Elymnias vasudeva synonymy

Scientific classification
- Kingdom: Animalia
- Phylum: Arthropoda
- Clade: Pancrustacea
- Class: Insecta
- Order: Lepidoptera
- Family: Nymphalidae
- Genus: Elymnias
- Species: E. vasudeva

Binomial name
- Elymnias vasudeva Moore, 1857
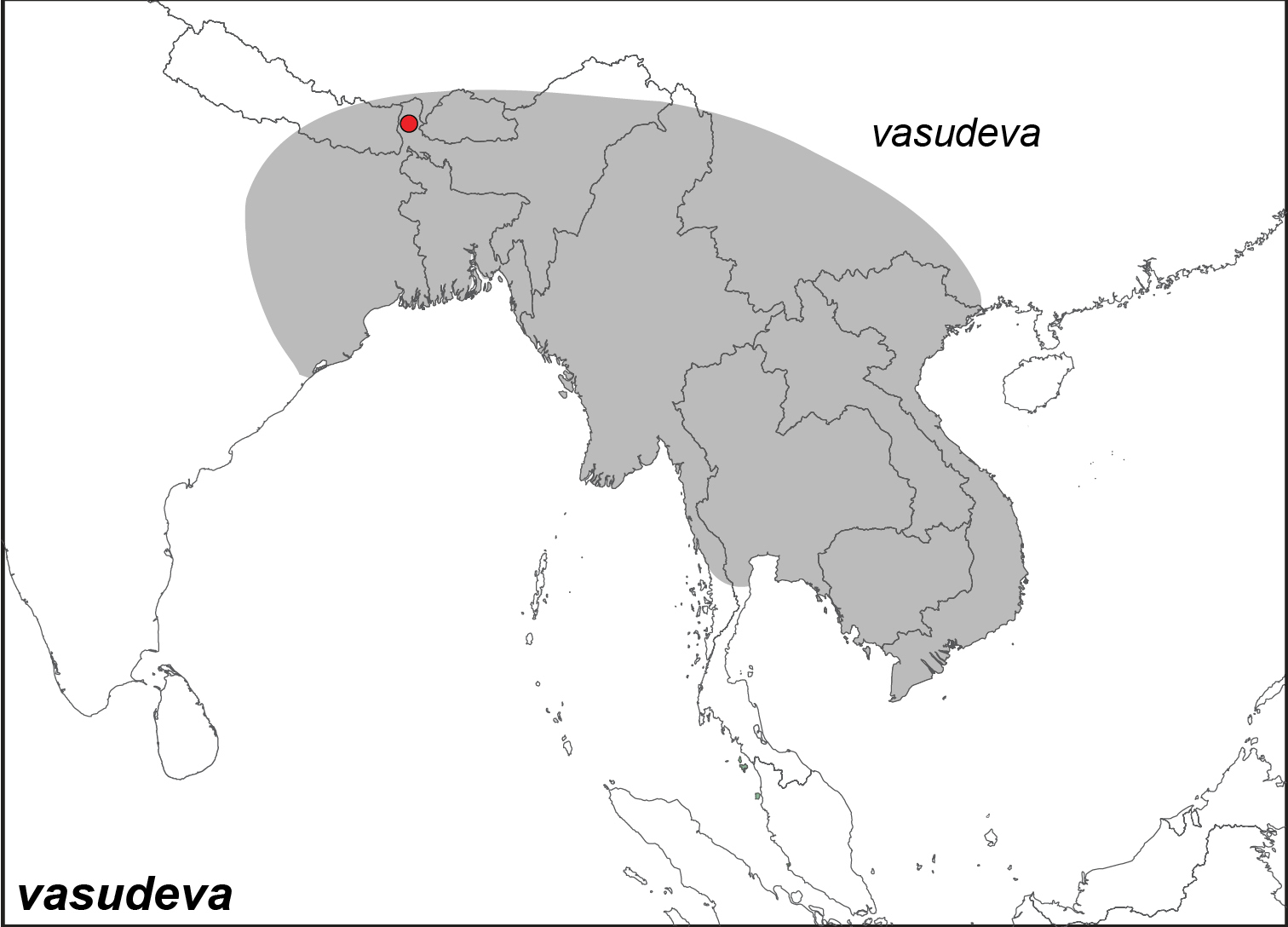

Synonyms
- Elymnias thycana Wallace, 1869; Mimadelias deva Moore, 1893; Mimadelias burmensis Moore, 1893; Elymnias oberthüri Fruhstorfer, 1902; Elymnias vacudeva sinensis Chou, Zhang & Xie, 2000

= Elymnias vasudeva =

Species of butterfly

Elymnias vasudeva, the Jezebel palmfly, is a butterfly in the family Nymphalidae. It was described by Frederic Moore in 1857. It is found in the Indomalayan realm.

== Subspecies ==
- E. v. vasudeva (Sikkim, Nepal)
- E. v. thycana Wallace, 1869 (India)
- E. v. deva (Moore, 1893) (Assam)
- E. v. burmensis (Moore, 1893) (Yunnan, Burma)
- E. v. oberthuri Fruhstorfer, 1902 (Thailand)
- E. v. sinensis Chou, Zhang & Xie, 2000 (Yunnan)
