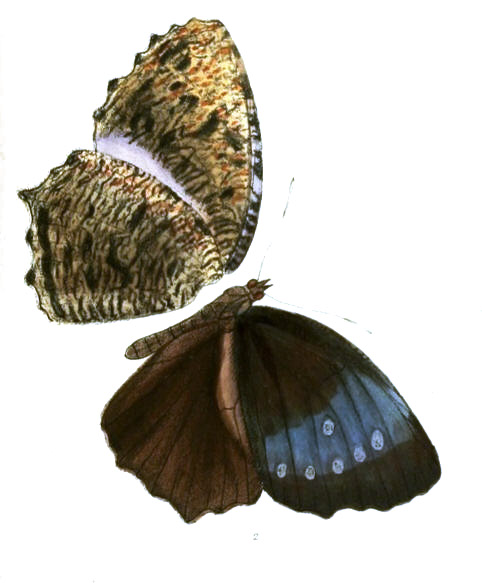
- In Lepidoptera Indica

Scientific classification
- Kingdom: Animalia
- Phylum: Arthropoda
- Clade: Pancrustacea
- Class: Insecta
- Order: Lepidoptera
- Family: Nymphalidae
- Genus: Elymnias
- Species: E. casiphone

Binomial name
- Elymnias casiphone Geyer, [1827]

Synonyms
- Elymnias saueri Distant, 1882

= Elymnias casiphone =

Species of butterfly

Elymnias casiphone is a butterfly in the family Nymphalidae. It was described by Carl Geyer in 1827. It is found in the Indomalayan realm.

== Subspecies ==
- E. c. casiphone (West Java)
- E. c. alumna Fruhstorfer, 1907 (East Java)
- E. c. saueri Distant, 1882 (Burma, Peninsular Malaysia, Thailand, Langkawi Island)
- E. c. djilantik Martin, 1909 (Bali)
- E. c. praetextata Fruhstorfer, 1896 (Lombok)
