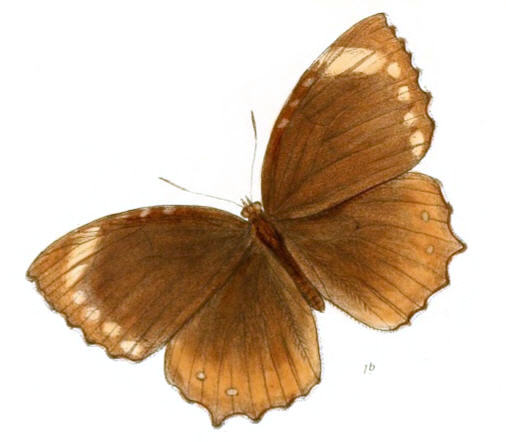

Scientific classification
- Kingdom: Animalia
- Phylum: Arthropoda
- Clade: Pancrustacea
- Class: Insecta
- Order: Lepidoptera
- Family: Nymphalidae
- Genus: Elymnias
- Species: E. cottonis

Binomial name
- Elymnias cottonis (Hewitson, 1874)

Synonyms
- Melanitis cottonis Hewitson, 1874

= Elymnias cottonis =

Species of butterfly

Elymnias cottonis is a butterfly in the family Nymphalidae. It was described by William Chapman Hewitson in 1874. It is endemic to the Andaman Islands in the Indomalayan realm.

== Subspecies ==
- E. c. cottonis
- E. c. jennifferae Suzuki, 2006 (Little Andaman Island, Butler Bay)
