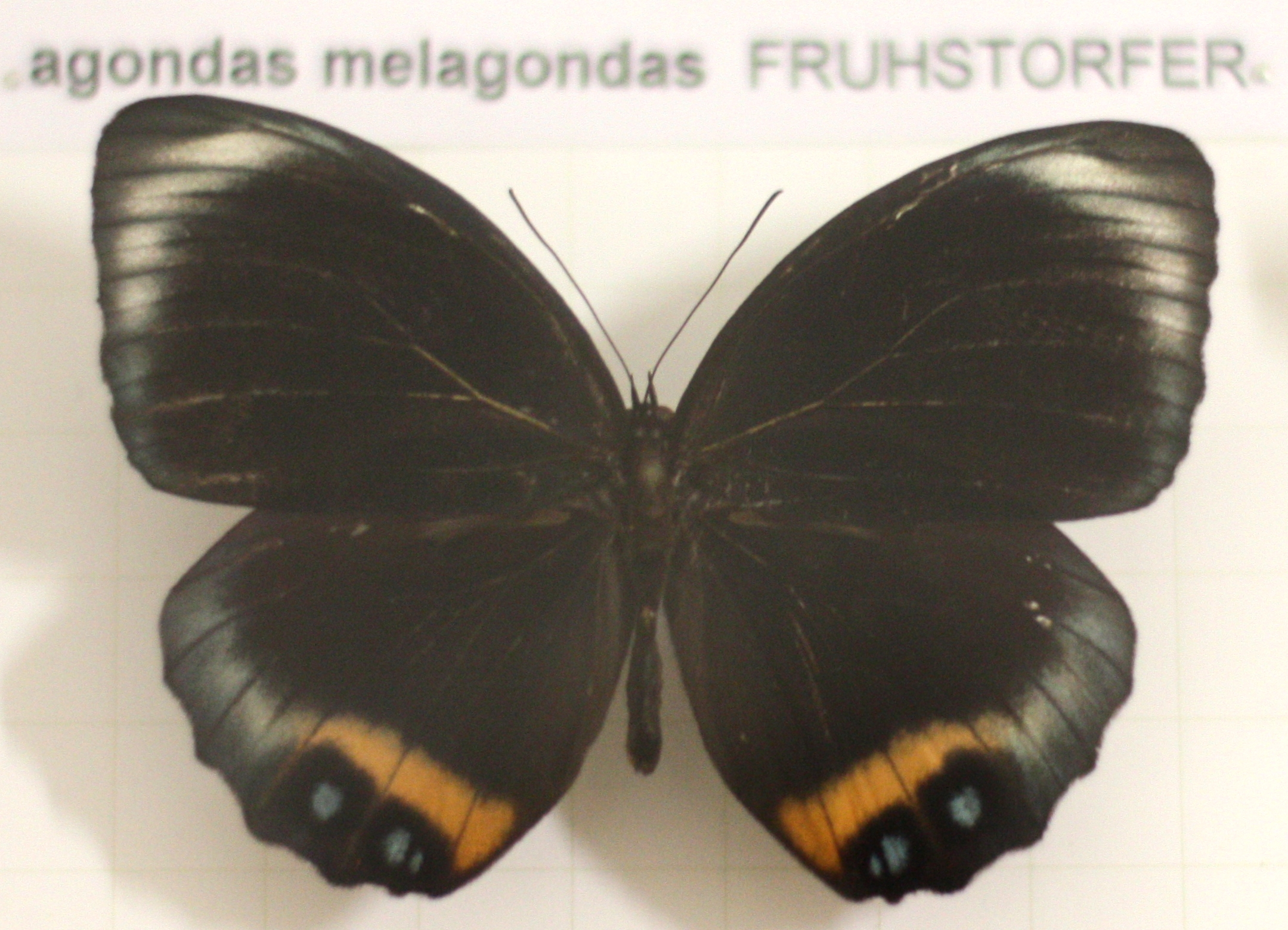
- In Übersee-Museum Bremen

Scientific classification
- Kingdom: Animalia
- Phylum: Arthropoda
- Clade: Pancrustacea
- Class: Insecta
- Order: Lepidoptera
- Family: Nymphalidae
- Genus: Elymnias
- Species: E. agondas

Binomial name
- Elymnias agondas (Boisduval, 1832)

Synonyms
- Dyctis agondas Boisduval, 1832; Elymnias (Dyctis) meletus de Nicéville, 1902; Elymnias (Dyctis) melitia de Nicéville, 1902; Elymnias agondas muscosa Fruhstorfer, 1907; Elymnias agondas tampyra Fruhstorfer, 1914; Elymnias agondas hagias Fruhstorfer, 1914; Elymnias agondas multocellata van Eecke, 1915; Dyctis bioculatus Westwood, 1850; Melanitis melane Hewitson, 1858; Elymnias (Dyctis) mela de Nicéville, 1902; Elymnias melantho Wallace, 1869; Elymnias agondas moranda Fruhstorfer, 1904; Elymnias glaucopis Staudinger, 1894; Elymnias melanippe Grose-Smith, 1894; Elymnias melanthes Grose-Smith, 1897; Elymnias agondas melanthes f. infernalis Fruhstorfer, 1914; Elymnias agondas melanthes f. virginalis Fruhstorfer, 1914; Elymnias agondas melagondas f. taenarides Fruhstorfer, 1914

= Elymnias agondas =

Species of butterfly

Elymnias agondas, the palmfly, is a butterfly in the family Nymphalidae. It was described by Jean Baptiste Boisduval in 1832. It is endemic to New Guinea and neighbouring Cape York in the Australasian realm.

== Subspecies ==
- E. a. agondas (Salawati)
- E. a. bioculatus Hewitson, 1851 (New Guinea: Arfak)
- E. a. melane Hewitson, 1858 (Kai Island)
- E. a. melantho Wallace, 1869 (Gagi Island, Gam Island, Waigeu)
- E. a. glaucopis Staudinger, 1894 (Northeast New Guinea)
- E. a. melanippe Grose-Smith, 1894 (German New Guinea)
- E. a. melanthes Grose-Smith, 1897 (Woodlark Island, Goodenough Island)
- E. a. melagondas Fruhstorfer, 1900 (Papua - South New Guinea)
- E. a. australiana Fruhstorfer, 1900 (Cape York, North Queensland: Claudie River)
- E. a. aruana Fruhstorfer, 1900 (Aru)
- E. a. goramensis Fruhstorfer, 1900 (Goram)
- E. a. dampierensis Rothschild, 1915 (Dampier Island)

== Biology ==
The larva feeds on Calamus caryotoides.
