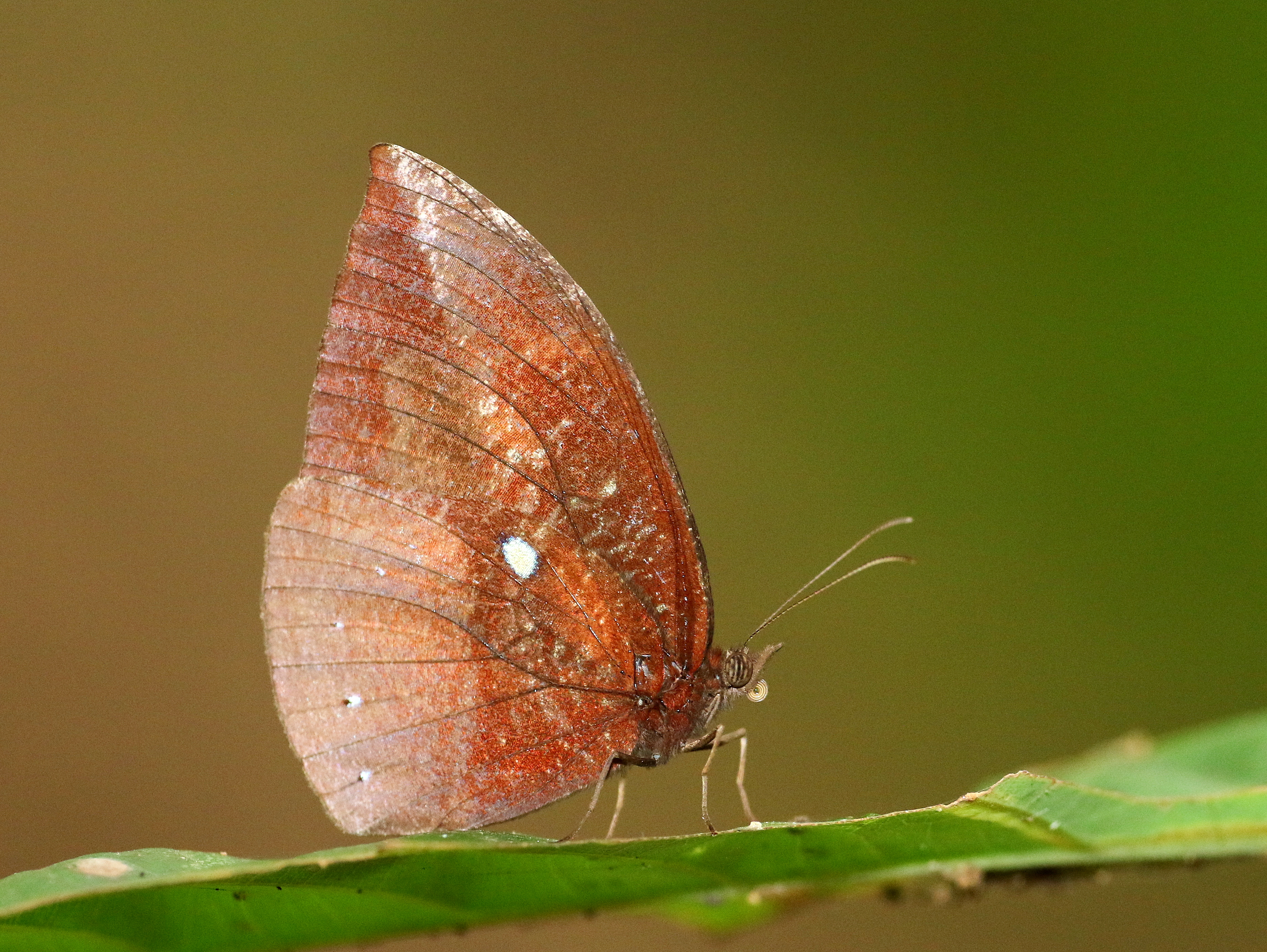

Scientific classification
- Kingdom: Animalia
- Phylum: Arthropoda
- Clade: Pancrustacea
- Class: Insecta
- Order: Lepidoptera
- Family: Nymphalidae
- Genus: Elymnias
- Species: E. penanga

Binomial name
- Elymnias penanga (Westwood, 1851)

Synonyms
- Melanitis penanga Westwood, 1851; Melaninis mehida Hewitson, 1863; Elymnias abrisa Distant, 1886; Elymnias penanga penanga f. hislopi Eliot, 1967; Elymnias penanga f. immaculata Martin, 1909; Elymnias penanga f. johnsoni Talbot, 1929; Elymnias sumatrana Wallace, 1869; Elymnias konga Grose-Smith, 1889; Elymnias borneensis Grose-Smith, 1892; Elymnias penanga trepsichroides Shelford, 1904; Elymnias penanga konga f. mehidina Fruhstorfer, 1907; Elymnias penanga konga f. ptychandrina Fruhstorfer, 1907; Elymnias chelensis de Nicéville, 1890

= Elymnias penanga =

Species of insect

Elymnias penanga, the pointed palmfly, is a butterfly in the family Nymphalidae. It was described by John Obadiah Westwood in 1851. It is found in the Indomalayan realm.

== Subspecies ==
- Elymnias penanga penanga (Peninsular Malaysia, Singapore, Langkawi)
- Elymnias penanga sumatrana Wallace, 1869 (Sumatra)
- Elymnias penanga konga Grose-Smith, 1889 (Borneo)
- Elymnias penanga chelensis de Nicéville, 1890 (Assam to Tenasserim, possibly Thailand)
