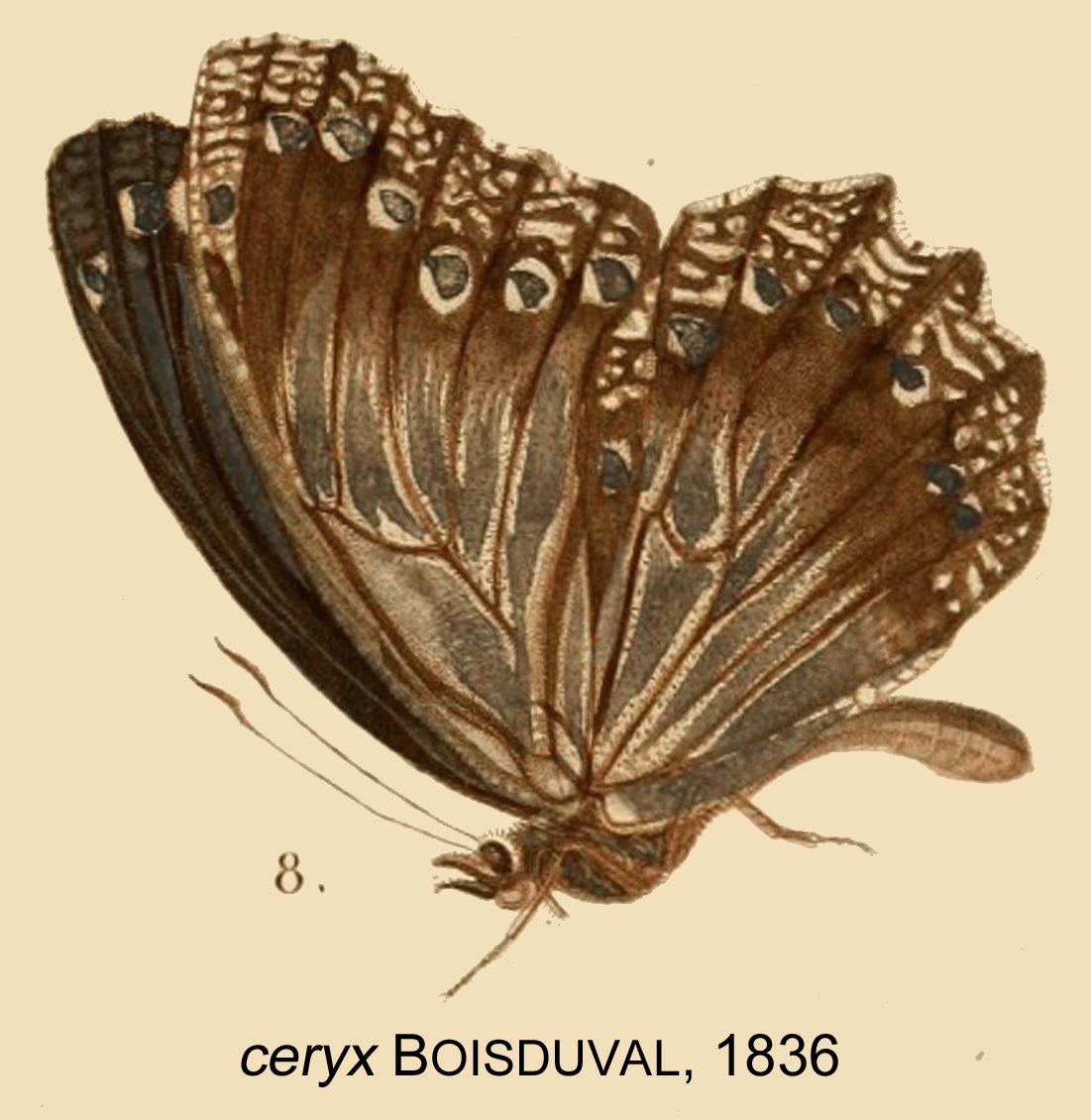
- Elymnias ceryx in Boisduval's Voyage de découvertes de l'Astrolabe

Scientific classification
- Kingdom: Animalia
- Phylum: Arthropoda
- Clade: Pancrustacea
- Class: Insecta
- Order: Lepidoptera
- Family: Nymphalidae
- Genus: Elymnias
- Species: E. ceryx

Binomial name
- Elymnias ceryx (Boisduval, 1836)
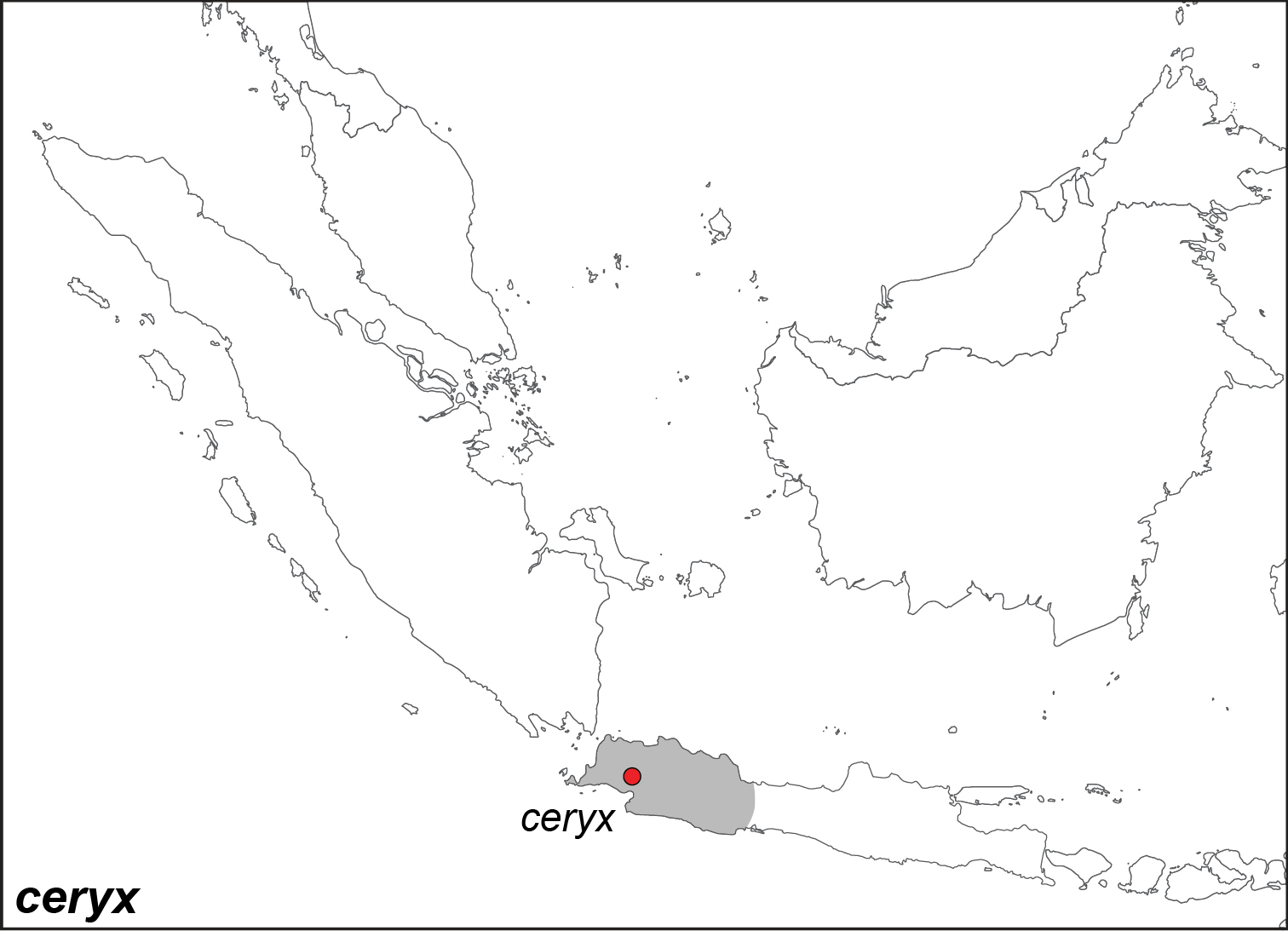

Synonyms
- Melanitis ceryx Boisduval, 1836; Elymnias (Melynias) ceryxoides de Nicéville, 1895

= Elymnias ceryx =

Species of butterfly

Elymnias ceryx is a butterfly in the family Nymphalidae. It was described by Jean Baptiste Boisduval in 1836. It is found in the Indomalayan realm.

== Subspecies ==
- E. c. ceryx (Java)
- E. c. ceryxoides de Nicéville, 1895 (Sumatra)
