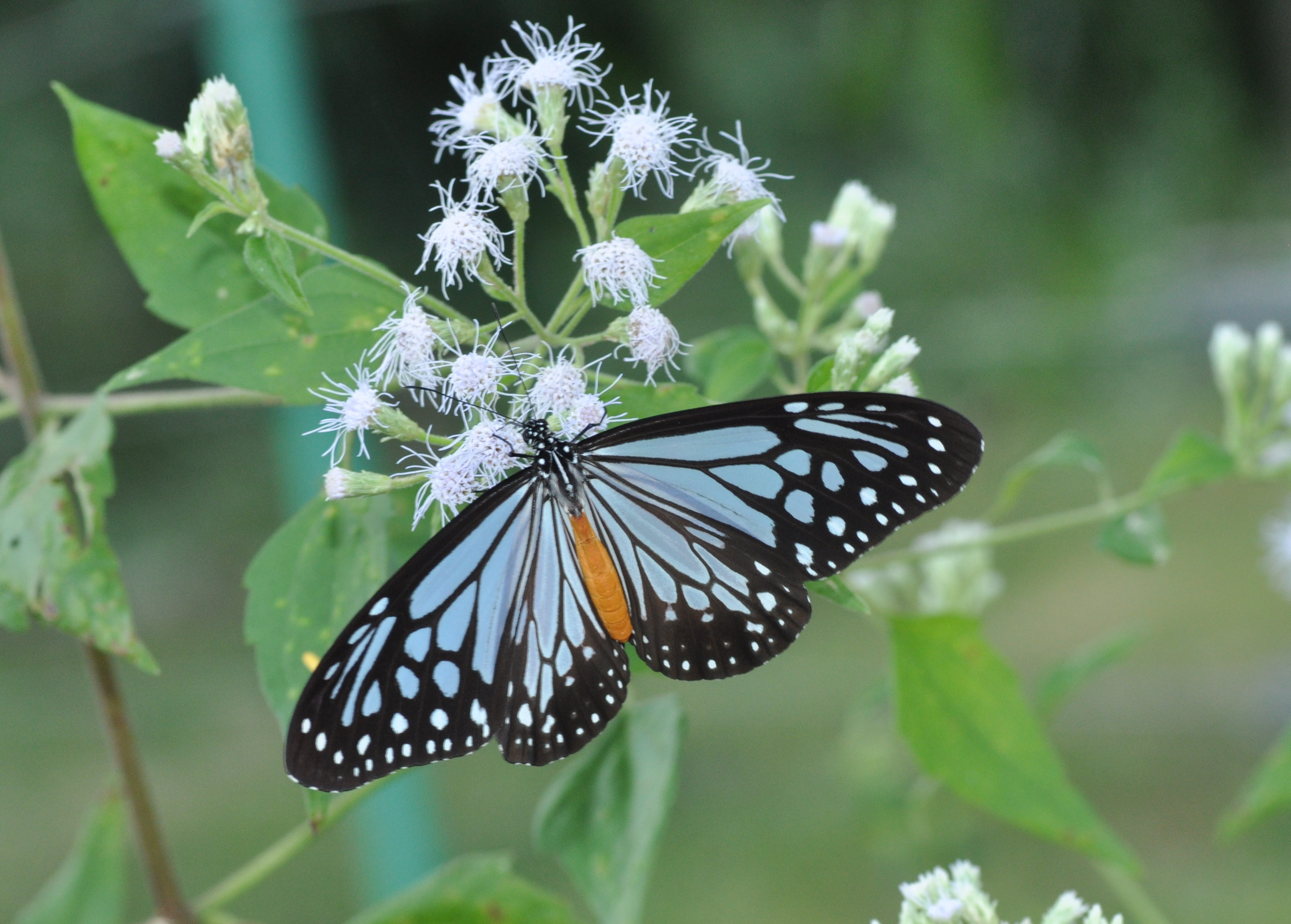

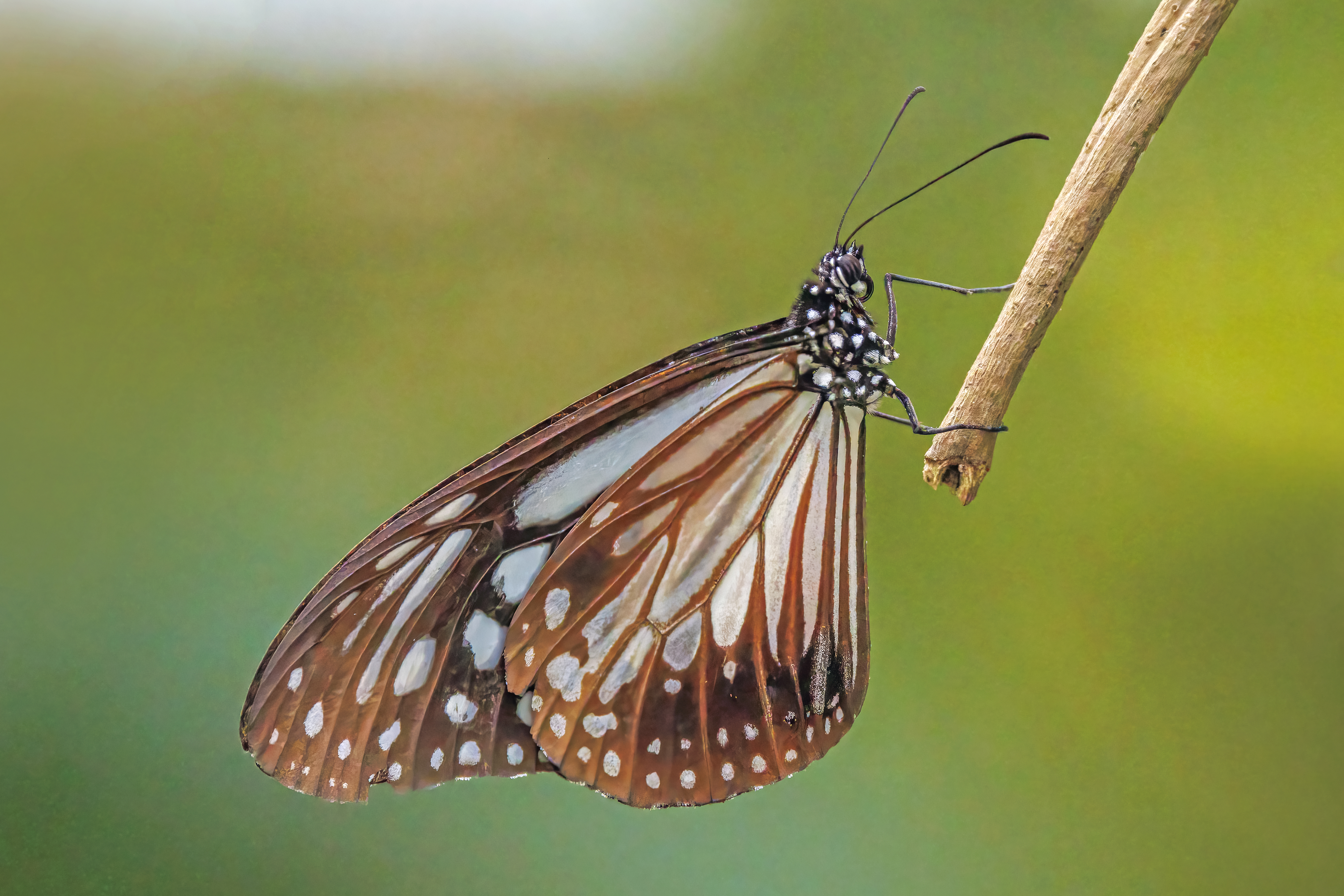
- Parantica melaneus sinopion, Laos

Scientific classification
- Kingdom: Animalia
- Phylum: Arthropoda
- Class: Insecta
- Order: Lepidoptera
- Family: Nymphalidae
- Genus: Parantica
- Species: P. melaneus

Binomial name
- Parantica melaneus (Cramer, 1775)

Synonyms
- Danais melanea

= Parantica melaneus =

Species of butterfly

Parantica melaneus (known colloquially as the chocolate tiger), is a butterfly found in Asia that belongs to the crows and tigers, that is, the danaid group of the brush-footed butterflies family.

== Description ==
Upperside: forewing black, Hindwing very dark purplish brown, with faintly bluish white subhyaline markings. Underside: forewing black, the apex broadly suffused with bright chestnut-brown; hindwing bright chestnut-browvn, with a patch on the costa and a portion of the disc and termen very much darker in most specimens. For the rest exactly resembles D. tytia in form and disposition of the subhyaline markings, but these are more clearly defined and it is proportionately smaller, the subterminal and terminal spots on the hindwing-generally very distinct. Antennas black; head and thorax black, spotted with white; abdomen bright ochraceous. Expanse: 94–100 mm.

== Range ==
The eastern Himalayas; Assam; Burma; Tenasserim, extending to the Malayan subregion.
