= List of butterflies of Thailand =

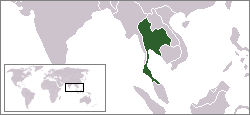
Location of Thailand

This is a list of butterflies of Thailand. About 1,100 species are known from Thailand.

== Papilionidae ==
=== Parnassiinae ===
- Bhutanitis lidderdalei ocellatomaculata

=== Papilioninae ===
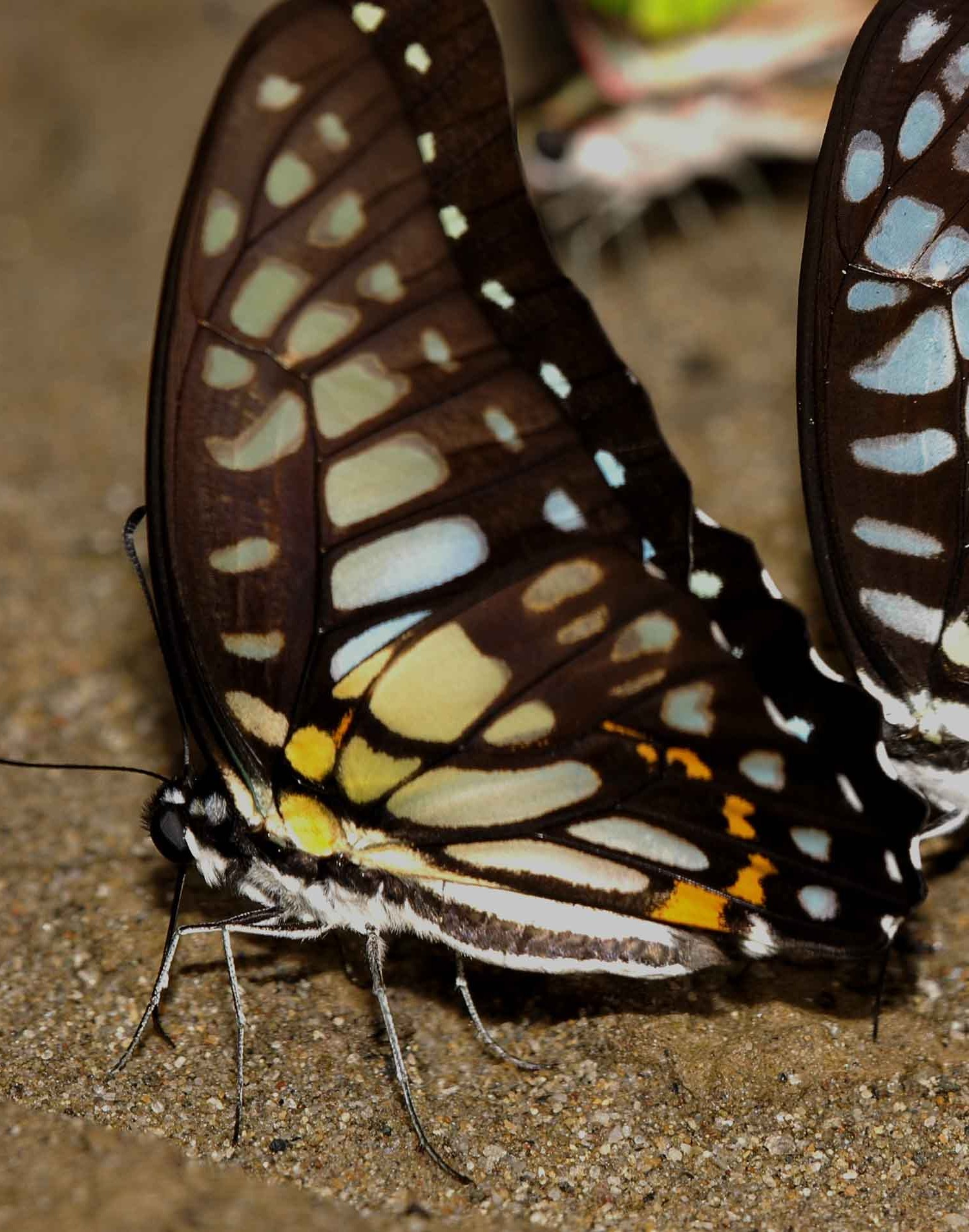
Graphium chironides

- Atrophaneura aidoneus
- Atrophaneura sycorax
- Atrophaneura varuna
- Atrophaneura zaleucus
- Byasa adamsoni
- Byasa dasarada
- Byasa laos
- Byasa polyeuctes
- Graphium agamemnon
- Graphium agetes
- Graphium antiphates
- Graphium aristeus
- Graphium arycles
- Graphium bathycles
- Graphium chironides
- Graphium cloanthus
- Graphium delessertii
- Graphium doson
- Graphium eurous
- Graphium eurypylus
- Graphium evemon
- Graphium glycerion
- Graphium macareus
- Graphium megarus
- Graphium nomius
- Graphium ramaceus
- Graphium sarpedon
- Graphium xenocles
- Lamproptera curius
- Lamproptera meges
- Losaria coon
- Losaria neptunus
- Meandrusa payeni
- Meandrusa sciron
- Pachliopta aristolochiae
- Papilio agestor
- Papilio alcmenor
- Papilio arcturus
- Papilio bianor
- Papilio clytia
- Papilio demoleus
- Papilio demolion
- Papilio dialis
- Papilio epycides
- Papilio helenus
- Papilio iswara
- Papilio mahadeva
- Papilio memnon
- Papilio nephelus
- Papilio noblei
- Papilio palinurus
- Papilio paradoxa
- Papilio paris
- Papilio pitmani
- Papilio polyctor
- Papilio polytes
- Papilio prexaspes
- Papilio protenor
- Papilio slateri
- Teinopalpus imperialis
- Troides aeacus
- Troides amphrysus
- Troides helena

== Pieridae ==
=== Pierinae ===
- Aporia agathon
- Appias albina
- Appias cardena
- Appias indra
- Appias lalage
- Appias lalassis
- Appias libythea
- Appias lyncida
- Appias nero
- Appias pandione
- Appias paulina
- Cepora iudith
- Cepora nadina
- Cepora nerissa
- Delias acalis
- Delias agoranis
- Delias agostina
- Delias belladonna
- Delias berinda
- Delias descombesi
- Delias hyparete
- Delias lativitta
- Delias ninus
- Delias pasithoe
- Delias patrua
- Delias sanaca
- Delias singhapura
- Hebomoia glaucippe
- Ixias pyrene
- Leptosia nina
- Pareronia avatar
- Pareronia hippia
- Pareronia valeria
- Phrissura aegis
- Pieris brassicae
- Pieris canidia
- Pieris napi
- Pontia daplidice
- Prioneris philonome
- Prioneris thestylis
- Saletara liberia

=== Coliadinae ===
- Catopsilia pomona
- Catopsilia pyranthe
- Catopsilia scylla
- Dercas verhuelli
- Eurema ada
- Eurema andersonii
- Eurema blanda
- Eurema brigitta
- Eurema hecabe
- Eurema lacteola
- Eurema laeta
- Eurema pallida
- Eurema sari
- Eurema simulatrix
- Eurema tilaha
- Gandaca harina

== Nymphalidae ==
=== Danainae ===
- Danaus affinis
- Danaus chrysippus
- Danaus genutia
- Danaus melanippus
- Euploea algea
- Euploea camaralzeman
- Euploea core
- Euploea crameri
- Euploea doubledayi
- Euploea eunice
- Euploea eyndhovii
- Euploea midamus
- Euploea modesta
- Euploea mulciber
- Euploea phaenareta
- Euploea radamanthus
- Euploea sylvester
- Euploea tulliolus
- Idea hypermnestra
- Idea leuconoe
- Idea lynceus
- Idea stolli
- Ideopsis gaura
- Ideopsis similis
- Ideopsis vulgaris
- Parantica aglea
- Parantica agleoides
- Parantica aspasia
- Parantica melaneus
- Parantica pedonga
- Parantica sita
- Tirumala gautama
- Tirumala limniace
- Tirumala septentrionis

=== Satyrinae ===
- Callerebia annada
- Callerebia narasing
- Coelites epiminthia
- Coelites euptychioides
- Coelites nothis
- Elymnias casiphone
- Elymnias dara
- Elymnias esaca
- Elymnias hypermnestra
- Elymnias malelas
- Elymnias nesaea
- Elymnias obnubila
- Elymnias panthera
- Elymnias patna
- Elymnias penanga
- Elymnias vasudeva
- Erites angularis
- Erites argentina
- Erites falcipennis
- Erites medura
- Ethope diademoides
- Ethope himachala
- Ethope noirei
- Lethe bhairava
- Lethe chandica
- Lethe confusa
- Lethe distans
- Lethe dura
- Lethe europa
- Lethe gulnihal
- Lethe kansa
- Lethe latiaris
- Lethe mekara
- Lethe minerva
- Lethe naga
- Lethe rohria
- Lethe sidereal
- Lethe sinorix
- Lethe sura
- Lethe verma
- Lethe vindhya
- Mandarinia regalis
- Melanitis leda
- Melanitis phedima
- Melanitis zitenius
- Mycalesis adamsoni
- Mycalesis anapita
- Mycalesis anaxias
- Mycalesis anaxiodes
- Mycalesis annamitica
- Mycalesis deficiens
- Mycalesis distanti
- Mycalesis francisca
- Mycalesis fusca
- Mycalesis gotama
- Mycalesis intermedia
- Mycalesis janardana
- Mycalesis lepcha
- Mycalesis maianeas
- Mycalesis malsara
- Mycalesis mineus
- Mycalesis mnasicles
- Mycalesis nicotia
- Mycalesis oroatis
- Mycalesis orseis
- Mycalesis perseoides
- Mycalesis perseus
- Mycalesis sangaica
- Mycalesis suaveolens
- Mycalesis thailandica
- Mycalesis visala
- Neope armandii
- Neope muirheadi
- Neope pulaha
- Neorina crishna
- Neorina hila
- Neorina lowii
- Orinoma damaris
- Orsotriaena medus
- Penthema binghami
- Penthema darlisa
- Ragadia crisilda
- Ragadia critias
- Ragadia makutasiponta
- Xanthotaenia busiris
- Ypthima affectata
- Ypthima akbar
- Ypthima baldus
- Ypthima confuse
- Ypthima dohertyi
- Ypthima evansi
- Ypthima fasciata
- Ypthima horsfieldii
- Ypthima huebneri
- Ypthima humei
- Ypthima lisandra
- Ypthima norma
- Ypthima pandocus
- Ypthima sacra
- Ypthima savara
- Ypthima similis
- Ypthima sobrina
- Ypthima watsoni
- Ypthima yunosukei

=== Amathusiinae ===
- Aemona lena
- Amathusia binghami
- Amathusia masina
- Amathusia ochraceofusca
- Amathusia phidippus
- Amathuxidia amythaon
- Discophora deo
- Discophora necho
- Discophora sondaica
- Discophora timora
- Enispe intermedia
- Faunis canens
- Faunis eumeus
- Faunis gracilis
- Faunis kirata
- Melanocyma faunula
- Stichophthalma camadeva
- Stichophthalma cambodia
- Stichophthalma godfreyi
- Stichophthalma louisa
- Thaumantis diores
- Thaumantis klugius
- Thaumantis noureddin
- Thaumantis odana
- Thauria aliris
- Zeuxidia amethystus
- Zeuxidia aurelius
- Zeuxidia doubledayi

=== Heliconiinae ===
- Acraea issoria
- Acraea violae
- Argynnis childreni
- Argynnis hyperbius
- Cethosia biblis
- Cethosia cyane
- Cethosia hypsea
- Cethosia penthesilea
- Cirrochroa aoris
- Cirrochroa emalea
- Cirrochroa orissa
- Cirrochroa satellite
- Cirrochroa surya
- Cirrochroa tyche
- Cupha erymanthis
- Paduca fasciata
- Phalanta alcippe
- Phalanta phalantha
- Terinos atlita
- Terinos clarissa
- Terinos terpander
- Vagrans egista
- Vindula dejone
- Vindula erota

=== Nymphalinae ===
- Ariadne ariadne
- Ariadne isaeus
- Ariadne merione
- Ariadne specularia
- Chersonesia intermedia
- Chersonesia peraka
- Chersonesia rahria
- Chersonesia risa
- Cyrestis cocles
- Cyrestis nivea
- Cyrestis themire
- Cyrestis thyodamas
- Doleschallia bisaltide
- Hypolimnas bolina
- Hypolimnas misippus
- Junonia almana
- Junonia atlites
- Junonia hierta
- Junonia iphita
- Junonia lemonias
- Junonia orithya
- Kallima inachus
- Kallima knyvetti
- Kallima limborgii
- Kaniska canace
- Laringa castelnaui
- Laringa horsfieldi
- Polygonia c-album
- Polygonia c-aureum
- Rhinopalpa polynice
- Symbrenthia hippoclus
- Symbrenthia hypatia
- Symbrenthia hypselis
- Symbrenthia liaea
- Vanessa cardui
- Vanessa indica
- Yoma sabina

=== Limenitidinae ===
- Athyma asura
- Athyma cama
- Athyma clerica
- Athyma kanwa
- Athyma larymna
- Athyma nefte
- Athyma opalina
- Athyma perius
- Athyma pravara
- Athyma punctata
- Athyma ranga
- Athyma reta
- Athyma selenophora
- Athyma zeroca
- Auzakia danava
- Bhagadatta austenia
- Euthalia aconthea
- Euthalia adonia
- Euthalia alpheda
- Euthalia anosia
- Euthalia byakko
- Euthalia djata
- Euthalia dunya
- Euthalia eriphylae
- Euthalia evelina
- Euthalia franciae
- Euthalia ipona
- Euthalia kanda
- Euthalia lubentina
- Euthalia mahadeva
- Euthalia malaccana
- Euthalia merta
- Euthalia monina
- Euthalia nara
- Euthalia narayana
- Euthalia patala
- Euthalia phemius
- Euthalia recta
- Euthalia teuta
- Euthalia whiteheadi
- Lebadea martha
- Lexias canescens
- Lexias cyanipardus
- Lexias dirtea
- Lexias pardalis
- Limenitis daraxa
- Limenitis dudu
- Limenitis houlberti
- Moduza procris
- Neptis ananta
- Neptis anjana
- Neptis armandia
- Neptis aurelia
- Neptis bieti
- Neptis cartica
- Neptis clinia
- Neptis columella
- Neptis dindinga
- Neptis duryodana
- Neptis harita
- Neptis heliodore
- Neptis hordonia
- Neptis hylas
- Neptis ilira
- Neptis jumbah
- Neptis leucoporos
- Neptis Magadha
- Neptis manasa
- Neptis miah
- Neptis monata
- Neptis namba
- Neptis narayana
- Neptis nashona
- Neptis nata
- Neptis omeroda
- Neptis paraka
- Neptis radha
- Neptis sandaka
- Neptis sankara
- Neptis sappho
- Neptis soma
- Neptis tiga
- Neptis viraja
- Neptis yerburii
- Neptis zaida
- Neurosigma siva
- Pandita sinope
- Parthenos sylvia
- Tanaecia aruna
- Tanaecia clathrata
- Tanaecia cocytus
- Tanaecia flora
- Tanaecia godartii
- Tanaecia iapis
- Tanaecia jahnu
- Tanaecia julii
- Tanaecia lepidea
- Tanaecia munda
- Tanaecia palguna
- Tanaecia pelea
- Tanaecia telchinia

=== Apaturinae ===
- Apatura ambica
- Apatura chevana
- Dichorragia nesimachus
- Eulaceura osteria
- Euripus consimilis
- Euripus nyctelius
- Heleyra hemina
- Herona marathus
- Herona sumatrana
- Hestina nama
- Hestina persimilis
- Pseudergolis wedah
- Rohana nakula
- Rohana parisatis
- Rohana parvata
- Rohana tonkiniana
- Sephisa chandra
- Stibochiona nicea

=== Charaxinae ===
- Agatasa calydonia
- Chraxes aristogiton
- Chraxes bernardus
- Chraxes distanti
- Chraxes durnfordi
- Chraxes kahruba
- Chraxes marmax
- Chraxes solon
- Polyura arja
- Polyura athamas
- Polyura delphis
- Polyura dolon
- Polyura eudamippus
- Polyura franck
- Polyura hebe
- Polyura jalysus
- Polyura moori
- Polyura nepenthes
- Polyura schreiber

=== Calinaginae ===
- Calinaga buddha

=== Libytheinae ===
- Libythea celtis
- Libythea geoffroyi
- Libythea myrrha
- Libythea narina

== Lycaenidae ==
=== Poritiinae ===
- Cyaniriodes libna
- Deramas jasoda
- Deramas livens
- Poritia erycinoides
- Poritia hewitsoni
- Poritia phama
- Poritia philota
- Poritia plateni
- Poritia sumatrae
- Simiskina pasira
- Simiskina phalena
- Simiskina phalia
- Simiskina pharyge
- Simiskina proxima

=== Miletinae ===
- Liphyra brassolis
- Allotinus davidis
- Allotinus drumila
- Allotinus felderi
- Allotinus horsfieldi
- Allotinus leogoron
- Allotinus substrigosa
- Allotinus subviolaceus
- Allotinus taras
- Allotinus unicolor
- Caleta decidia
- Caleta elna
- Caleta roxus
- Castalius rosimon
- Discolampa ethion
- Everes argiades
- Everes hugelii
- Everes lacturnnus
- Logania malayica
- Logania marmorata
- Logania massalia
- Logania regina
- Miletus ancon
- Miletus biggsii
- Miletus chinensis
- Miletus croton
- Miletus gallus
- Miletus gopara
- Miletus mallus
- Miletus nymphis
- Miletus symethus
- Spalgis epius
- Taraka hamada
- Taraka mahanetra
- Tarucus callinara

=== Polyommatinae ===
- Acytolepis cossaea
- Acytolepis puspa
- Anthene emolus
- Anthene lycaenina
- Azanus urios
- Bothrinia chennelli
- Catochrysops panormus
- Catochrysops strabo
- Catopyrops ancyra
- Celastrina argiolus
- Celastrina lavendularis
- Celastrina pellecebra
- Celastrina transpecta
- Celatoxia marginata
- Chilades lajus
- Euchrysops cnejus
- Freyeria putli
- Freyeria trochylus
- Ionolyce helicon
- Jamides abdul
- Jamides alecto
- Jamides bochus
- Jamides caeruleus
- Jamides celeno
- Jamides cunilda
- Jamides cyta
- Jamides elpis
- Jamides malaccanus
- Jamides parasaturatus
- Jamides philatus
- Jamides pura
- Jamides talinga
- Jamides zebra
- Lampides boeticus
- Luthrodes pandava
- Lycaenopsis haraldus
- Megisba malaya
- Nacaduba angusta
- Nacaduba berenice
- Nacaduba beroe
- Nacaduba calauria
- Nacaduba hermus
- Nacaduba kurava
- Nacaduba pactolus
- Nacaduba pavana
- Nacaduba sanaya
- Nacaduba subperusia
- Neopithecops zalmora
- Niphanda asialis
- Niphanda cymbia
- Niphanda tessellate
- Orthomiella pontis
- Petrelaea dana
- Pithcops corvus
- Prosotas aluta
- Prosotas dubiosa
- Prosotas gracilis
- Prosotas lutea
- Prosotas nora
- Prosotas noreia
- Prosotas pia
- Shijimia moorei
- Syntarucus plinius
- Talicada nyseus
- Tongeia potanini
- Udara dilecta
- Udara placidula
- Udara Selma
- Una usta
- Zizeeria karandra
- Zizeeria maha
- Zizina otis
- Zizula hylax

=== Lycaeninae ===
- Heliophorus androcles
- Heliophorus brahma
- Heliophorus epicles
- Heliophorus hybrida
- Heliophorus ila
- Heliophorus indicus

=== Theclinae ===
- Amblypodia anita
- Amblypodia narada
- Ancema blanka
- Ancema ctesia
- Apporasa atkinsoni
- Araotes Iapithis
- Arhopala aberrans
- Arhopala abseus
- Arhopala ace
- Arhopala aedias
- Arhopala aeeta
- Arhopala agaba
- Arhopala agelastus
- Arhopala agesilaus
- Arhopala agrata
- Arhopala aida
- Arhopala alaconia
- Arhopala alax
- Arhopala alesia
- Arhopala alitaeus
- Arhopala allata
- Arhopala amantes
- Arhopala ammon
- Arhopala ammonides
- Arhopala amphimuta
- Arhopala anarte
- Arhopala anthelus
- Arhopala antimuta
- Arhopala ariana
- Arhopala ariel
- Arhopala aroa
- Arhopala arvina
- Arhopala asinarus
- Arhopala asopia
- Arhopala athada
- Arhopala atosia
- Arhopala atrax
- Arhopala auretia
- Arhopala avatha
- Arhopala barami
- Arhopala bazaloides
- Arhopala bazalus
- Arhopala birmana
- Arhopala buddha
- Arhopala camdeo
- Arhopala catori
- Arhopala cleander
- Arhopala corinda
- Arhopala delta
- Arhopala democritus
- Arhopala dispar
- Arhopala elopura
- Arhopala epimete
- Arhopala epimuta
- Arhopala eumolphus
- Arhopala evansi
- Arhopala fulla
- Arhopala havilandi
- Arhopala hellenore
- Arhopala horsfieldi
- Arhopala hypomuta
- Arhopala ijauensis
- Arhopala inornata
- Arhopala khamti
- Arhopala labuana
- Arhopala lurida
- Arhopala major
- Arhopala metanmuta
- Arhopala milleri
- Arhopala moolaiana
- Arhopala moorei
- Arhopala muta
- Arhopala myrzala
- Arhopala nicevillei
- Arhopala normani
- Arhopala oenea
- Arhopala opalina
- Arhopala paraganesa
- Arhopala paralea
- Arhopala paramuta
- Arhopala perimuta
- Arhopala phaenops
- Arhopala phanda
- Arhopala pseudocentaurus
- Arhopala pseudomuta
- Arhopala rama
- Arhopala selta
- Arhopala silhetensis
- Arhopala similis
- Arhopala singla
- Arhopala sublustris
- Arhopala vihara
- Arhopala wildeyana
- Arhopala zambra
- Artipe eryx
- Bindahara phocides
- Britomartis cleoboides
- Bullis stigmata
- Catapaecilma elegans
- Catapaecilma major
- Catapaecilma subochrea
- Charana mandarina
- Cheritra freja
- Cheritrella truncipennis
- Chilaria kina
- Chilaria othona
- Chrysozephyrus sikkimensis
- Cowania achaja
- Creon cleobis
- Dacalana burmana
- Dacalana cotys
- Dacalana penicilligera
- Dacalana sinhara
- Deudorix elioti
- Deudorix epijarbas
- Deudorix hypargyria
- Drina donina
- Drina maneia
- Drupadia estella
- Drupadia johorensis
- Drupadia ravindra
- Drupadia rufotaenia
- Drupadia scaeva
- Drupadia theda
- Eooxylides tharis
- Flos adriana
- Flos anniella
- Flos areste
- Flos asoka
- Flos diardi
- Flos fulgida
- Flos fulgida
- Horaga onyx
- Horaga syrinx
- Horage amethysta
- Hypochrysops coelisparsus
- Hypolycaena amabilis
- Hypolycaena erylus
- Hypolycaena merguia
- Hypolycaena thecloides
- Iraota distanti
- Iraota rochana
- Iraota timoleon
- Jacoona anasuja
- Loxura atymnus
- Loxura cassiopeia
- Mahathala ameria
- Mantoides gama
- Mantoides hypoleuca
- Mota massyla
- Neocheritra amrita
- Neocheritra fabronia
- Neomyrina nivea
- Pratapa deva
- Pratapa icetas
- Pratapa icetoides
- Pseudotajuria donatana
- Purlisa gigantea
- Rachana jalindra
- Rapala abonormis
- Rapala damona
- Rapala dieneces
- Rapala domitia
- Rapala elcia
- Rapala iarbus
- Rapala manea
- Rapala nissa
- Rapala pheretima
- Rapala reclivitta
- Rapala refulgens
- Rapala scintilla
- Rapala suffusa
- Rapala varuna
- Remelana jangala
- Semanga superba
- Sinthusa chandrana
- Sinthusa malika
- Sinthusa nasaka
- Sithon nedymond
- Suasa lisides
- Surendra florimel
- Surendra quercetorum
- Surendra vivarna
- Tajuria cippus
- Tajuria culta
- Tajuria deudorix
- Tajuria diaeus
- Tajuria isaeus
- Tajuria maculata
- Tajuria mantra
- Tajuria yajna
- Thaduka multicaudata
- Thamala marciana
- Ticherra acte
- Virachola isocrates
- Virachola kessuma
- Virachola perse
- Virachola rubida
- Yasoda androconifera
- Yasoda pita
- Yasoda tripunctata
- Zeltus amasa
- Zinaspa todara

=== Aphnaeinae ===
- Cigaritis lohita
- Cigaritis maximus
- Cigaritis seliga
- Cigaritis syama
- Cigaritis vixinga
- Cigaritis vulcanus

=== Curetinae ===
- Curetis acuta
- Curetis bulis
- Curetis dentata
- Curetis insularis
- Curetis regula
- Curetis santana
- Curetis saronis
- Curetis sperthis
- Curetis tagalica

== Riodinidae ==
- Abisara abonormis
- Abisara bifasciata
- Abisara burnii
- Abisara echerius
- Abisara freda
- Abisara fylla
- Abisara kausambi
- Abisara neophron
- Abisara saturata
- Abisara savitri
- Dodona deodata
- Dodona dipoea
- Dodona donira
- Dodona egeon
- Dodona eugenes
- Dodona ouida
- Laxita thuisto
- Paralaxita damajanti
- Paralaxita orphna
- Paralaxita telesia
- Striboges nymphidia
- Taxila haquinus
- Zemeros emesoides
- Zemeros flegyas

== Hesperiidae ==
=== Coeliadinae ===
- Badamia exclamationis
- Bibasis amara
- Bibasis anadi
- Bibasis etelka
- Bibasis gomata
- Bibasis harisa
- Bibasis iluska
- Bibasis jaina
- Bibasis oedipodea
- Bibasis sena
- Bibasis vasutana
- Choaspes benjaminii
- Choaspes hemixanthus
- Choaspes plateni
- Choaspes subcaudatus
- Choaspes xanthopogon
- Hasora anura
- Hasora badra
- Hasora chromus
- Hasora danda
- Hasora khoda
- Hasora proxissima
- Hasora salanga
- Hasora schoenherr
- Hasora taminatus
- Hasora vitta
- Hasora vitta
- Hasora zoma

=== Pyrginae ===
- Capila hainana
- Capila phanaeus
- Caprona agama
- Caprona alida
- Celaenorrhinus andamanicus
- Celaenorrhinus asmara
- Celaenorrhinus aurivittatus
- Celaenorrhinus dhanada
- Celaenorrhinus ficulnea
- Celaenorrhinus inaequalis
- Celaenorrhinus ladana
- Celaenorrhinus leucocera
- Celaenorrhinus munda
- Celaenorrhinus nigricans
- Celaenorrhinus patula
- Celaenorrhinus pero
- Celaenorrhinus pinratanai
- Celaenorrhinus putra
- Chamunda chamunda
- Coladenia agni
- Coladenia buchananii
- Coladenia indrani
- Coladenia laxmi
- Ctenoptilum multiguttatum
- Ctenoptilum vasava
- Darpa hanria
- Darpa pteria
- Darpa striata
- Gerosis bhagava
- Gerosis limax
- Gerosis phisara
- Lobocla liliana
- Mooreana trichoneura
- Odina decorata
- Odina hieroglyphica
- Odontoptilum angulatum
- Odontoptilum pygela
- Pintara pinwilli
- Pseudocoladenia dan
- Sarangesa dasahara
- Satarupa gopala
- Seseria affinis
- Seseria sambara
- Seseria strigata
- Spialia galba
- Tagiades calligana
- Tagiades cohaereus
- Tagiades gana
- Tagiades japetus
- Tagiades lavatus
- Tagiades litigiosus
- Tagiades menaka
- Tagiades parra gala
- Tagiades toba
- Tagiades ultra
- Tapena thawaitesi

=== Hesperiinae ===
- Matapa sasivarna
- Acerbas anthea
- Acerbas martini
- Aeromachus pygmaeus
- Aeromachus stigmatus
- Ampittia dioscorides
- Ampittia maroides
- Ancistroiedes armatus
- Ancistroiedes gemmifer
- Ancistroiedes nigrita
- Apostictopterus fuliginosus
- Arnetta atkinsoni
- Arnetta verones
- Astictopterus jama
- Baoris farri
- Baoris oceia
- Baoris pagana
- Baoris penicillata
- Borbo bevani
- Borbo cinnara
- Caltoris bromus
- Caltoris brunnea
- Caltoris cahira
- Caltoris cormasa
- Caltoris kumara
- Caltoris Malaya
- Caltoris plebeia
- Caltoris sirius
- Caltoris tenuis
- Caltoris tulsi
- Cephrenes chrysozona
- Cupitha purreea
- Cyrina cyrina
- Eetion elia
- Erionota acroleuca
- Erionota sybirita
- Erionota thrax
- Erionota torus
- Gangara lebadea
- Gangara thysis
- Ge geta
- Halpe arcuata
- Halpe aurifera
- Halpe burmana
- Halpe elana
- Halpe flava
- Halpe hauxwelli
- Halpe insignis
- Halpe kusala
- Halpe ormenes
- Halpe pelethronix
- Halpe porus
- Halpe sikkima
- Halpe toxopea
- Halpe wantona
- Halpe zema
- Halpe zola
- Hidari irava
- Hyarotis adrastus
- Hyarotis iadera
- Hyarotis microsticta
- Iambrix salsala
- Iambrix stellifer
- Idmon distanti
- Idmon obiquans
- Isma bononia
- Isma feralia
- Isma guttulifera
- Isma kuala
- Isma miosticta
- Isma obscura
- Isma protoclea
- Isma umbrosa
- Iton semamora
- Iton watsonii
- Koruthaialos butleri
- Koruthaialos rubecula
- Koruthaialos sindu
- Lotongus avesta
- Lotongus calathus
- Lotongus sarala
- Matapa aria
- Matapa cresta
- Matapa druma
- Notocrypta clavata
- Notocrypta curvifascia
- Notocrypta feisthamelii
- Notocrypta paralysos
- Notocrypta pria
- Ochlodes brahma
- Ochlodes siva
- Ochus subvittatus
- Oerane microthyrus
- Onryza albipecta
- Onryza siamica
- Oriens gola
- Oriens goloides
- Oriens paragola
- Parnara ganga
- Parnara guttata
- Parnara naso
- Pelopidas agna
- Pelopidas assamensis
- Pelopidas conjunctus
- Pelopidas mathias
- Pelopidas subochraceus
- Pemara pugnans
- Pinthauria marsena
- Pinthauria murdava
- Pinthauria stranmineipennis
- Pirdana distanti
- Pirdana hyela
- Plastingia naga
- Plastingia pellonia
- Polytremis annama
- Polytremis discreta
- Polytremis eltola
- Polytremis lubricans
- Polytremis minuta
- Potanthus confucius
- Potanthus flavus
- Potanthus ganda
- Potanthus hetaerus
- Potanthus juno
- Potanthus Lydia
- Potanthus mingo
- Potanthus nesta
- Potanthus omaha
- Potanthus pallida
- Potanthus palnia
- Potanthus parvus
- Potanthus pseudomaesa
- Potanthus recifasciatus
- Potanthus trachala
- Pseudokerana fulgur
- Psolos fuligo
- Pyroneura callineura
- Pyroneura derna
- Pyroneura flavia
- Pyroneura helena
- Pyroneura latoia
- Pyroneura margherita
- Pyroneura niasana
- Pyroneura perakana
- Quedara monteithi
- Salanoemia fuscicornis
- Salanoemia sala
- Salanoemia tavoyana
- Scobura cephala
- Scobura cephaloides
- Scobura isota
- Scobura phiditia
- Scobura woolletti
- Sebastonyma pudens
- Sovia albipecta
- Suada swerga
- Suastus everyx
- Suastus gremius
- Suastus minutus
- Taractrocera archias
- Taractrocera maevius
- Taractrocera ziclea
- Telicota augias
- Telicota bambusae
- Telicota besta
- Telicota colon
- Telicota Hilda
- Telicota linna
- Telicota ohara
- Thoressa cerata
- Thoressa masoni
- Udaspes folus
- Unkana ambasa
- Unkana flava
- Unkana mytheca
- Xanthoneura corissa
- Zela adorabilis
- Zela elioti
- Zela smaragdinus
- Zela zeus
- Zographetus ogygia
- Zographetus ogygioides
- Zographetus rama
- Zographetus satwa
- Zongraphetus doxus

== See also ==
- List of species native to Thailand
- List of ants of Thailand
- List of beetles of Thailand
