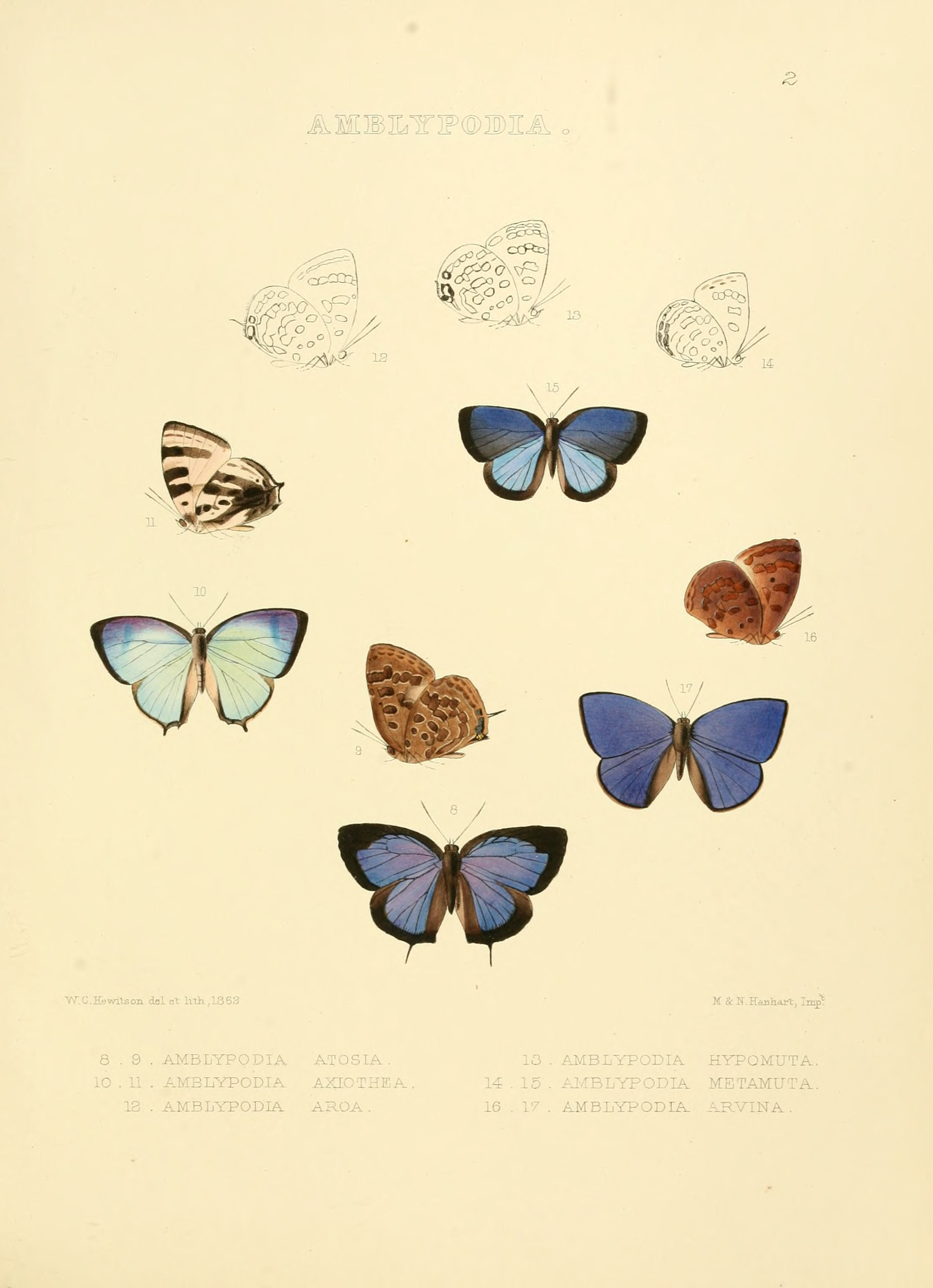
- Arhopala aroa from original description

Scientific classification
- Kingdom: Animalia
- Phylum: Arthropoda
- Clade: Pancrustacea
- Class: Insecta
- Order: Lepidoptera
- Family: Lycaenidae
- Genus: Arhopala
- Species: A. aroa

Binomial name
- Arhopala aroa (Hewitson, 1863)

= Arhopala aroa =

Species of butterfly

Arhopala aroa is a butterfly in the family Lycaenidae. It was described by William Chapman Hewitson in 1863. It is found in the Indomalayan realm.

== Description ==
Of this rather small species [forewing 19-21mm. ] there are specimens known with and without tails; probably the very fine small tails are easily lost in capturing the insect. Similar to selta, easily discernible by the light brown under surface and the narrow black margins above. female purplish blue, dark border tapering to tornus.

== Subspecies ==
- A. a. aroa Peninsular Malaya, Borneo, Sumatra, Java, Basilan
- A. a. esava Corbet, 1941 Burma, Mergui, Thailand
- A. a. pryeri Butler, 1892 Borneo
