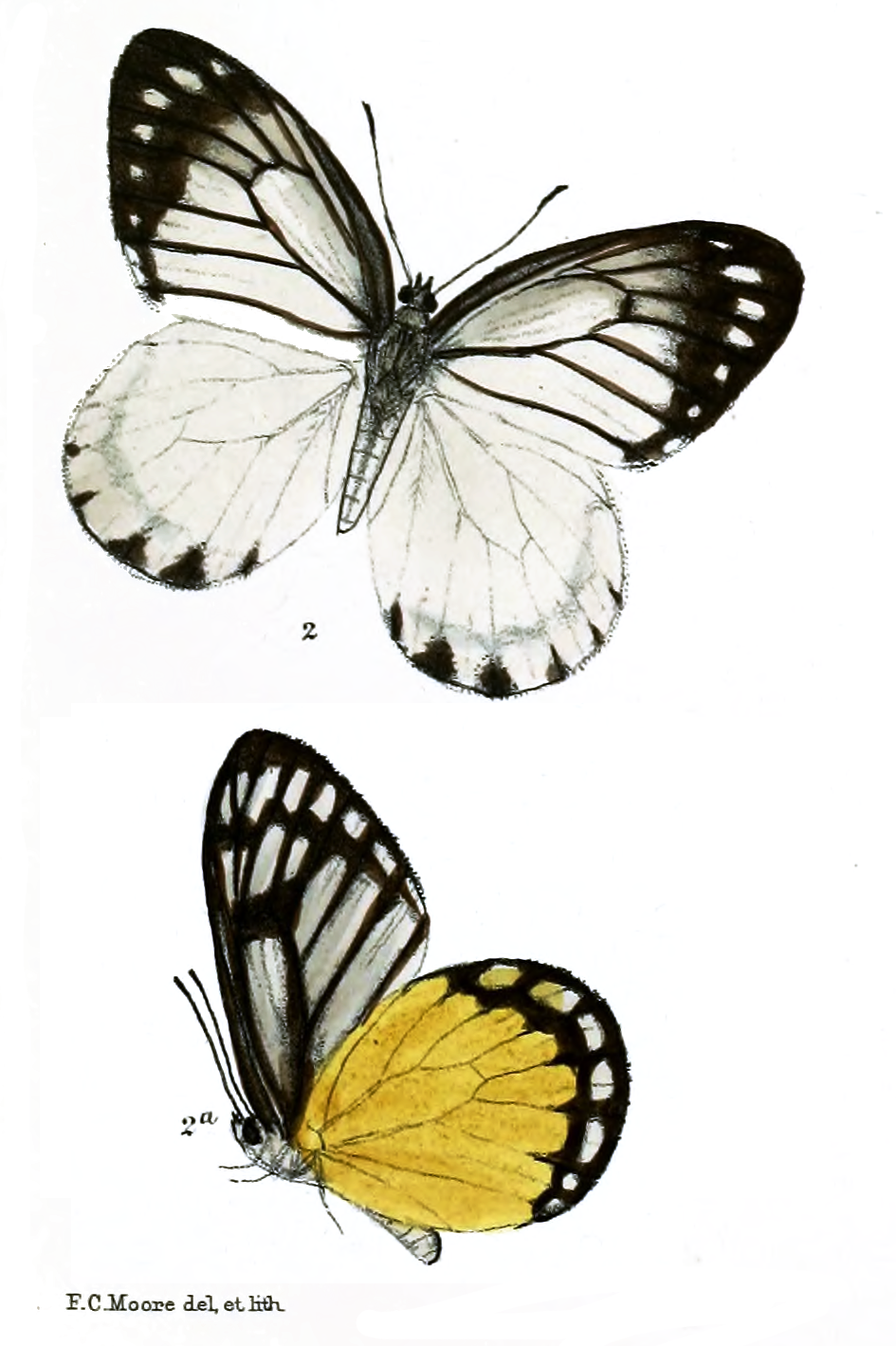

Scientific classification
- Kingdom: Animalia
- Phylum: Arthropoda
- Clade: Pancrustacea
- Class: Insecta
- Order: Lepidoptera
- Family: Pieridae
- Genus: Delias
- Species: D. agoranis

Binomial name
- Delias agoranis Grose-Smith, 1887

= Delias agoranis =

Species of butterfly

Delias agoranis, the Burmese Jezebel, is a butterfly in the family Pieridae. It was described by Henley Grose-Smith in 1887. It is found in the Indomalayan realm, where it has been recorded from southern Burma and south-western Thailand.

== Description ==
Male.— Upperside. Anterior wings white, with the apical third grey, in the centre of which is a curved band of greyish-white spots, the lowest at the inner angle being on the margin; the veins and costa grey. Posterior wings creamy white, with the colour and border on the underside showing through; three large, triangular, grey, marginal spots at the tips of the second and third median nervules and of the submedian nervure.

Underside. Anterior wings as above, but darker; a large dark grey spot at the end of the cell; extending broadly along the second discoidal nervule, between the outer band of grey spots and the cell are four oblong white spots, the first and third being the largest. Posterior wings bright yellow, broadly bordered with dark grey; in the middle of the border is a row of oval white spots, the uppermost tinted with yellow; on the inner side of the border the grey extends partially up the nervures.

Expanse of wings 3 and 7/8 inches.

Hab. Burmah, Siamese frontier (Capt. Adamson).

In the collection of Mr. Adamson.

Near to D. agostina and D. Kuhni of Honrath; but a larger and more brightly coloured butterfly than the former.
