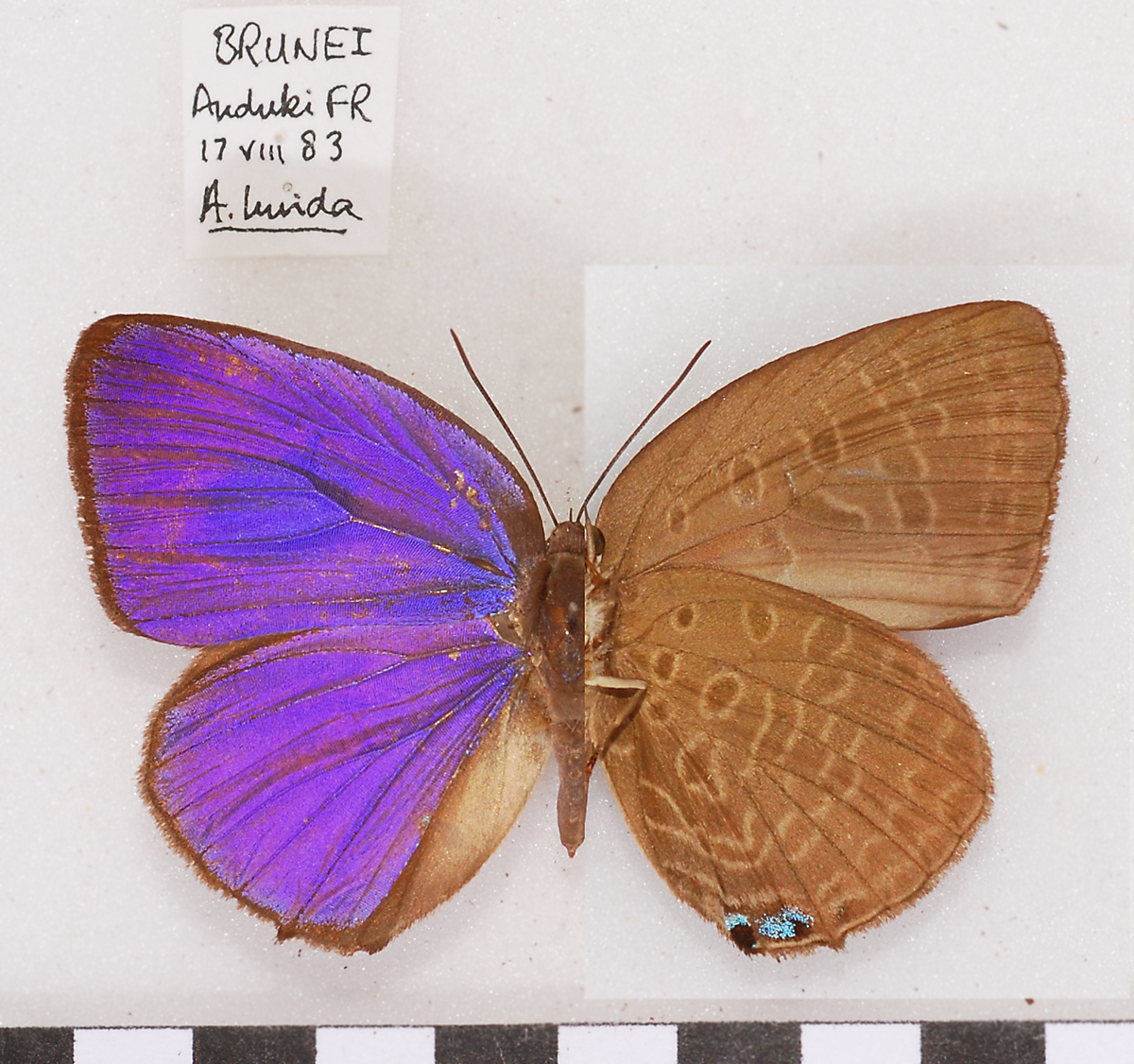

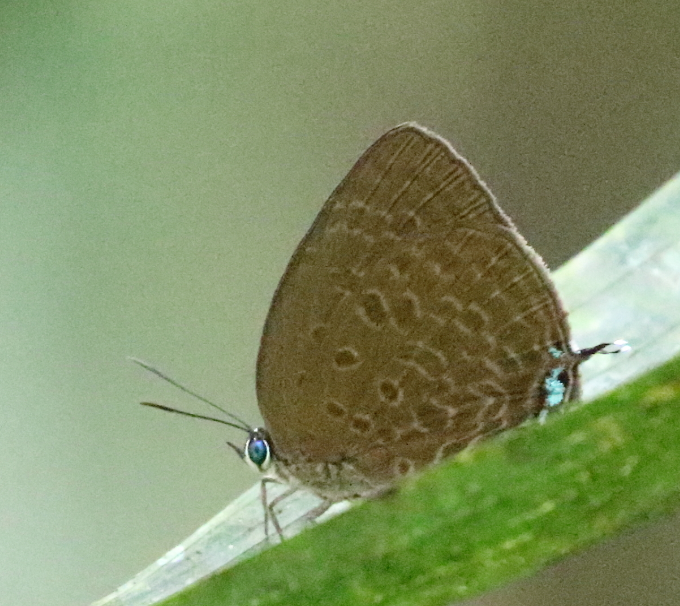

Scientific classification
- Kingdom: Animalia
- Phylum: Arthropoda
- Clade: Pancrustacea
- Class: Insecta
- Order: Lepidoptera
- Family: Lycaenidae
- Genus: Arhopala
- Species: A. lurida

Binomial name
- Arhopala lurida Corbet, 1941.

= Arhopala lurida =

Species of butterfly

Arhopala lurida is a species of butterfly belonging to the lycaenid family. It is found in Southeast Asia (Peninsular Malaya, Singapore, Langkawi, Sumatra, Borneo, Mentawai).
