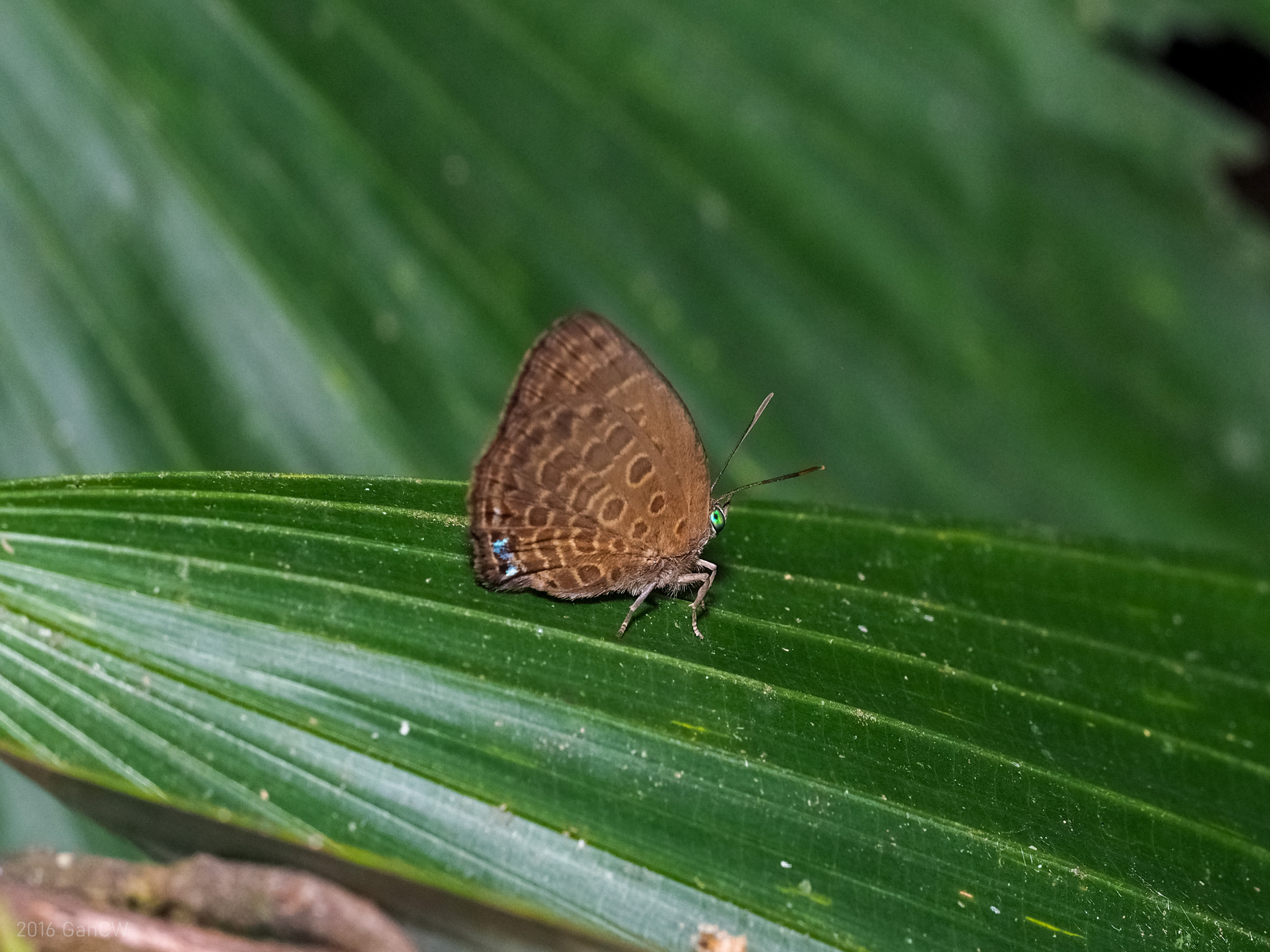

Scientific classification
- Kingdom: Animalia
- Phylum: Arthropoda
- Class: Insecta
- Order: Lepidoptera
- Family: Lycaenidae
- Subfamily: Theclinae
- Tribe: Arhopalini
- Genus: Arhopala
- Species: A. wildeyana

Binomial name
- Arhopala wildeyana Corbet, 1941

Synonyms
- Narathura wildeyana

= Arhopala wildeyana =

Species of butterfly

Arhopala wildeyana is a butterfly in the family Lycaenidae. It was described by Alexander Steven Corbet in 1941. It is found in Malaysia.

== Description ==
The female is bright shining blue with a border of 4 millimeters. The male is paler, and the border is wider. It is amongst the smallest of the Arhopala butterflies.

This butterfly's caterpillars are associated with ants of genus Oecophylla. It is not rare in low-elevation montane forests.

== Subspecies ==
Two subspecies are recognized-

- Arhopala wildeyana havea (Corbet, 1941) - Langkawi Islands
- Arhopala wildeyana wildeyana (Eliot, 1972) - West Malaysia
