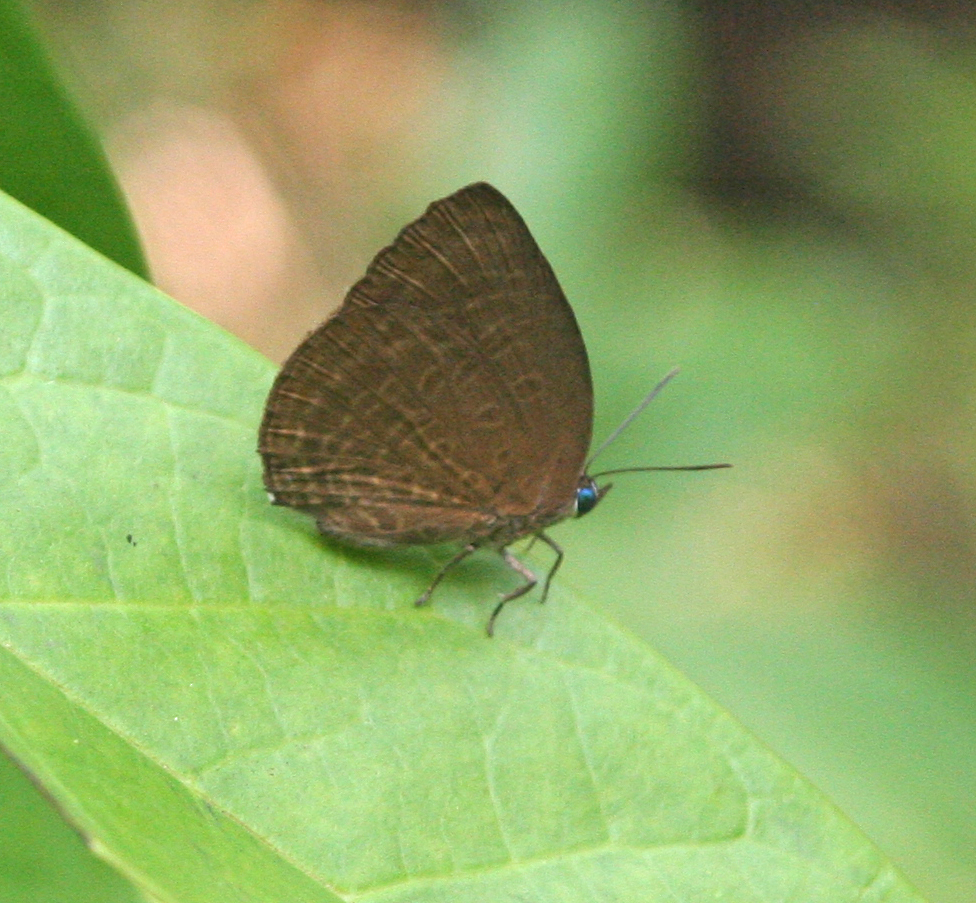

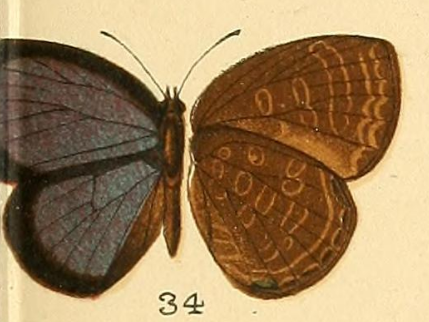
- from Journal of the Bombay Natural History Society, 1886

Scientific classification
- Kingdom: Animalia
- Phylum: Arthropoda
- Class: Insecta
- Order: Lepidoptera
- Family: Lycaenidae
- Subfamily: Theclinae
- Tribe: Arhopalini
- Genus: Arhopala
- Species: A. avatha

Binomial name
- Arhopala avatha de Nicéville, 1896

Synonyms
- Narathura avatha

= Arhopala avatha =

Species of butterfly

Arhopala avatha is a butterfly in the family Lycaenidae. It was discovered by Lionel de Nicéville in 1896. It is found in Vietnam, Cambodia, Thailand and West Malaysia.

== Description ==
Male is dark shining purple on upper side with a approximately 2 millimeters border. The underside is dull hair-brown.

== Subspecies ==
Two subspecies are recognized-

- Arhopala avatha avatha (Evans, 1957) - Malaysia and Sumatra
- Arhopala avatha lana (Evans, 1957) - Mindanao.
