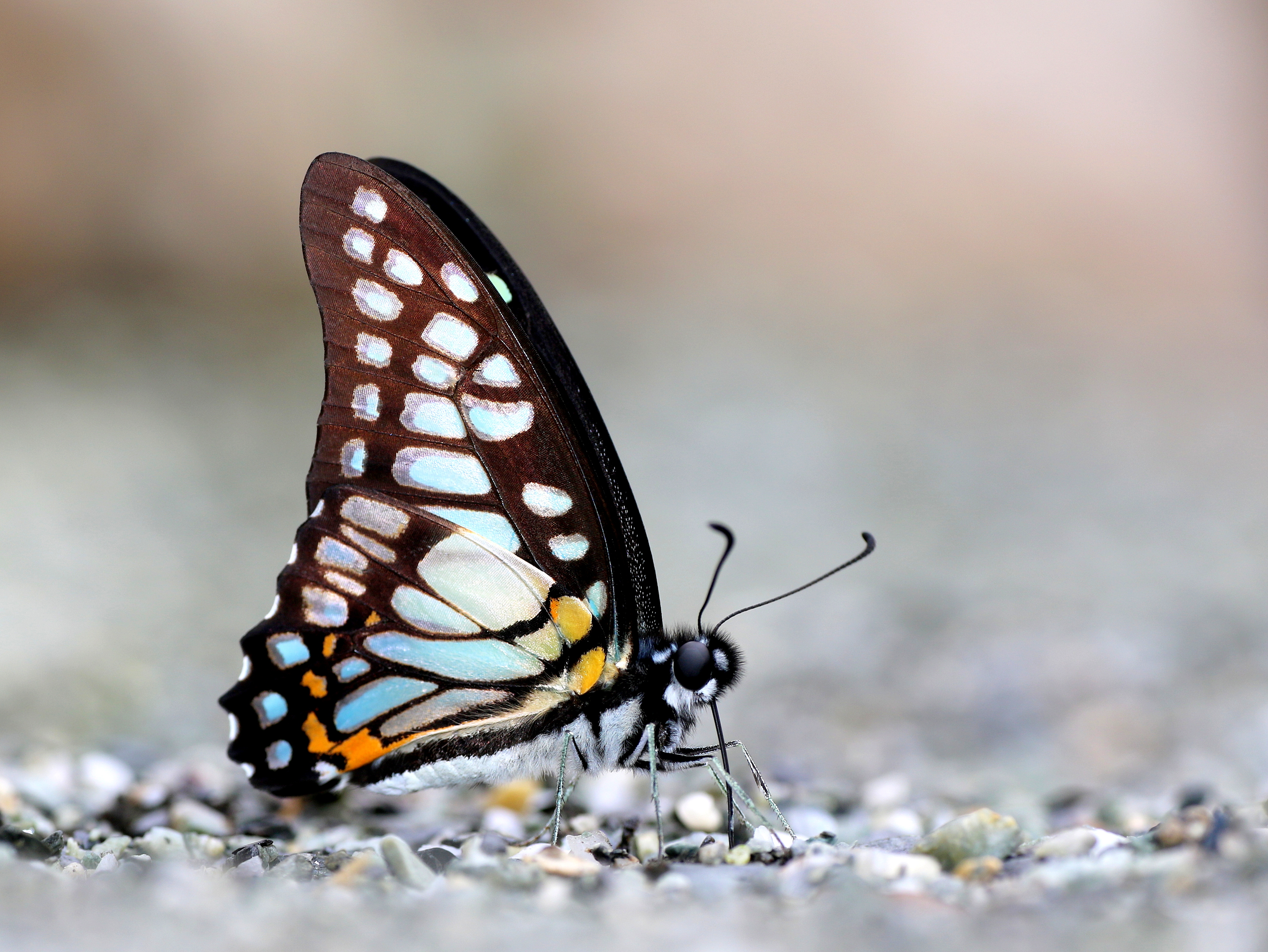

Scientific classification
- Kingdom: Animalia
- Phylum: Arthropoda
- Clade: Pancrustacea
- Class: Insecta
- Order: Lepidoptera
- Family: Papilionidae
- Genus: Graphium
- Species: G. chironides

Binomial name
- Graphium chironides (Honrath, 1884)

Synonyms
- Papilio chiron var. chironides Honrath, 1884; Papilio chiron Wallace, 1865; Graphium clanis chironicum Eliot, 1982; Papilio bathycles chiron f.vern. ligyra Jordan, 1909; Papilio clanis Jordan, 1909; Graphium clanis malayanum Eliot, 1982

= Graphium chironides =

Species of butterfly

Graphium chironides, the veined jay, is a species of butterfly found in Assam and other parts of Northeast India and Southeast Asia.

== Description ==
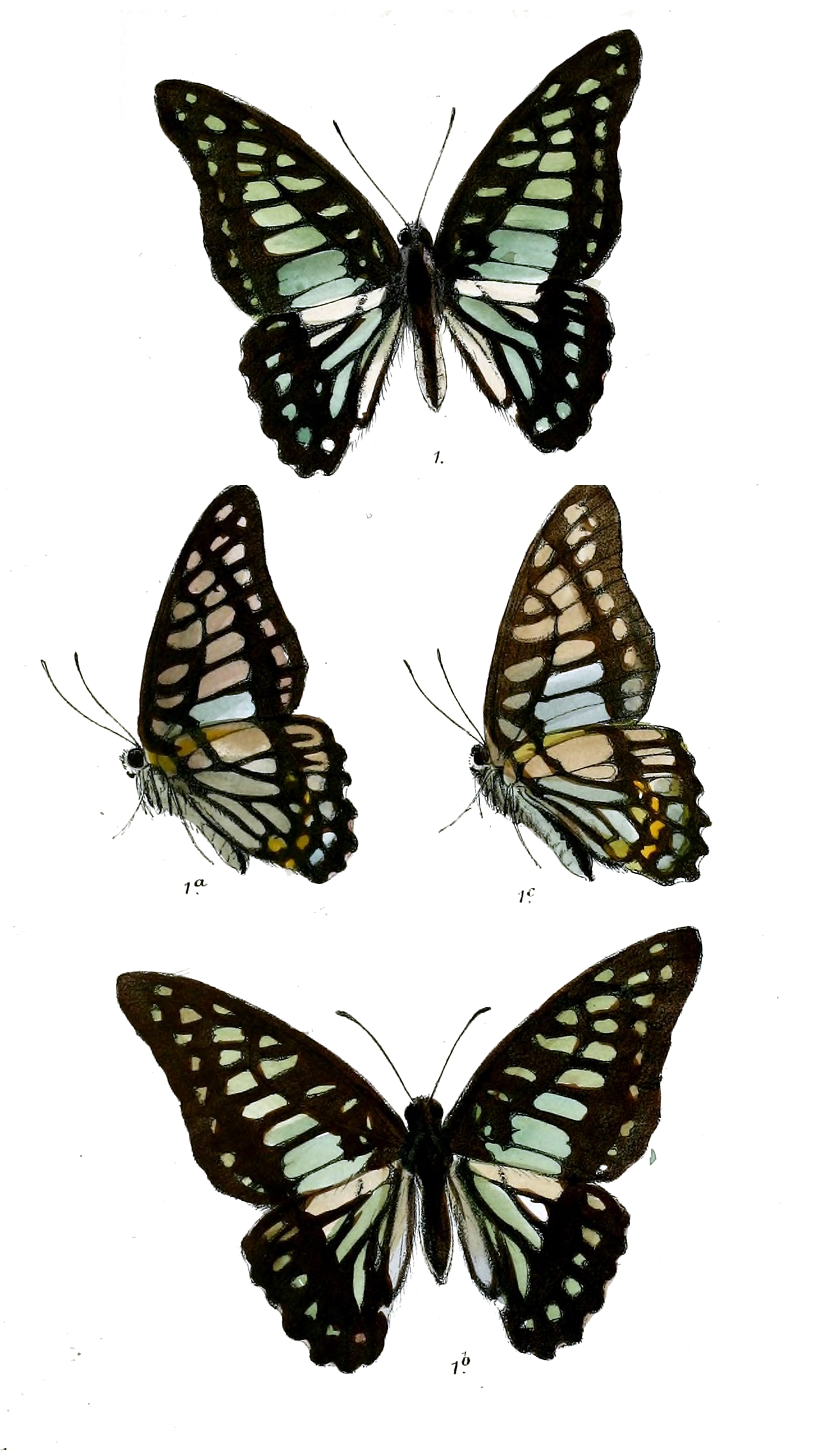
Male (1, 1a) and female (1b, 1c)

Closely resembles in colour and in the disposition of the markings Graphium eurypylus, races jason and axion more especially the latter, but on the upperside the anterior markings are all strongly tinged with yellow and the spots or patches that compose the discal band on both forewing and hindwing are well separated one from the other; on the hindwing, moreover, the apical spot of the subterminal series is invariably white, not pale green like the other spots of the series, and is very often elongate and diffuse. Underside: forewing very similar to that of axion. Hindwing: with the following silvery white markings: a moderately broad basal band reaches from costa across the wing and along the dorsum to the tornal angle, broad elongate streaks in the cell and in interspaces 2 and 3, a small spot at base of interspace 4, an inwardly conical larger elongate spot at base of 6, a very large quadrate spot in 7, and an elongate spot like that in 6 in interspace but outwardly not inwardly conical, interior to the two latter spots are two broad lunular spots in interspaces 7 and 8; all the anteriorly basal markings are strongly tinged with silky yellow; on the outer half of the wing there is a postdiscal series of orange yellow and a subterminal complete series of silvery-white spots, the upper two of which have further short narrow similarly-coloured streaks below them in the interspaces. Antennae head and thorax black, the thorax with dark greyish pubescence, abdomen brownish black; beneath and the abdomen laterally marked and streaked with white.

== Subspecies ==
- G. c. chironides (southern Yunnan, Assam)
- G. c. clanis (Jordan, 1909)
- G. c. malayanum Eliot, 1982 (Malaysia)
- G. c. chironides punctatus Page & Treadaway 2014 (Laos and southern Thailand)

== Taxonomy ==
Synonym of Graphium chiron (Wallace, 1865). Formerly regarded as a subspecies of Graphium bathycles but raised to specific level by Saigusa et al.
