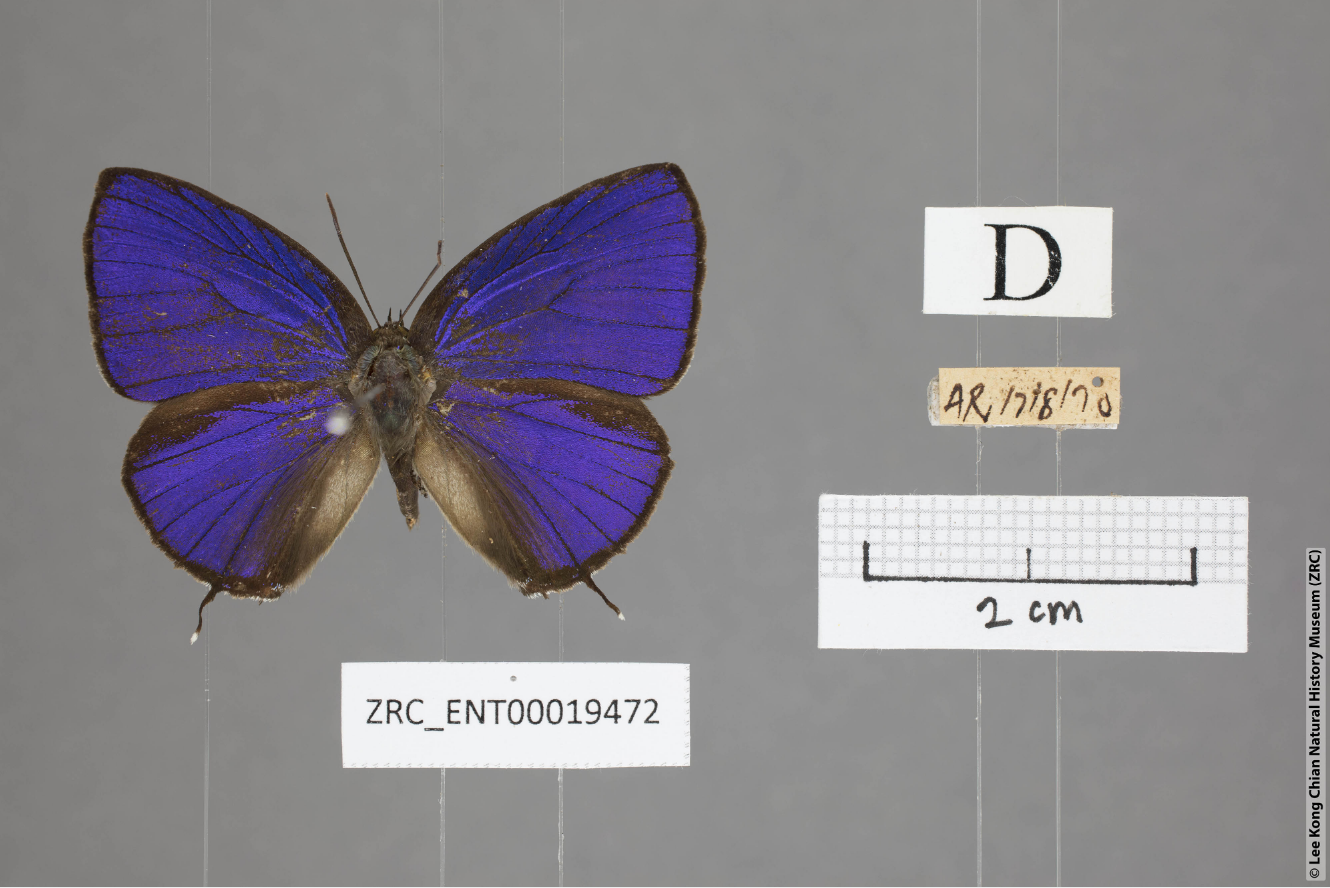
- Upperside
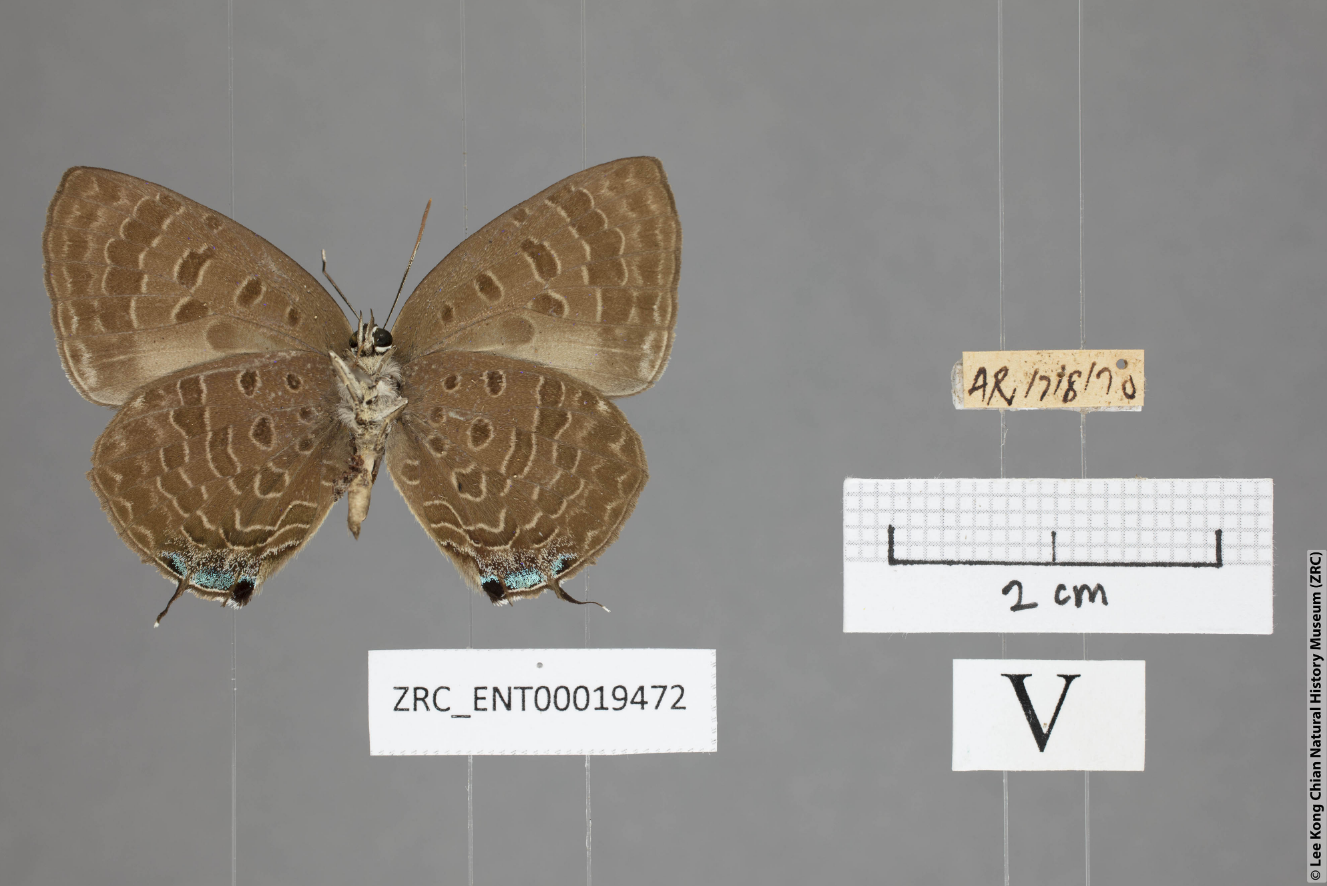
- Underside

Scientific classification
- Kingdom: Animalia
- Phylum: Arthropoda
- Class: Insecta
- Order: Lepidoptera
- Family: Lycaenidae
- Genus: Arhopala
- Species: A. evansi

Binomial name
- Arhopala evansi Corbet, 1941

Synonyms
- Narathura phaenops evansi

= Arhopala evansi =

Species of butterfly

Arhopala evansi is a butterfly in the family Lycaenidae. It was described by Alexander Steven Corbet in 1941. It is found in Malaysia, Thailand and Borneo.

== Description ==
The female is dark purple blue above, with the black border ranging from 0.5 to 1.25 millimeters. It is ochreous brown below with dark markings.
