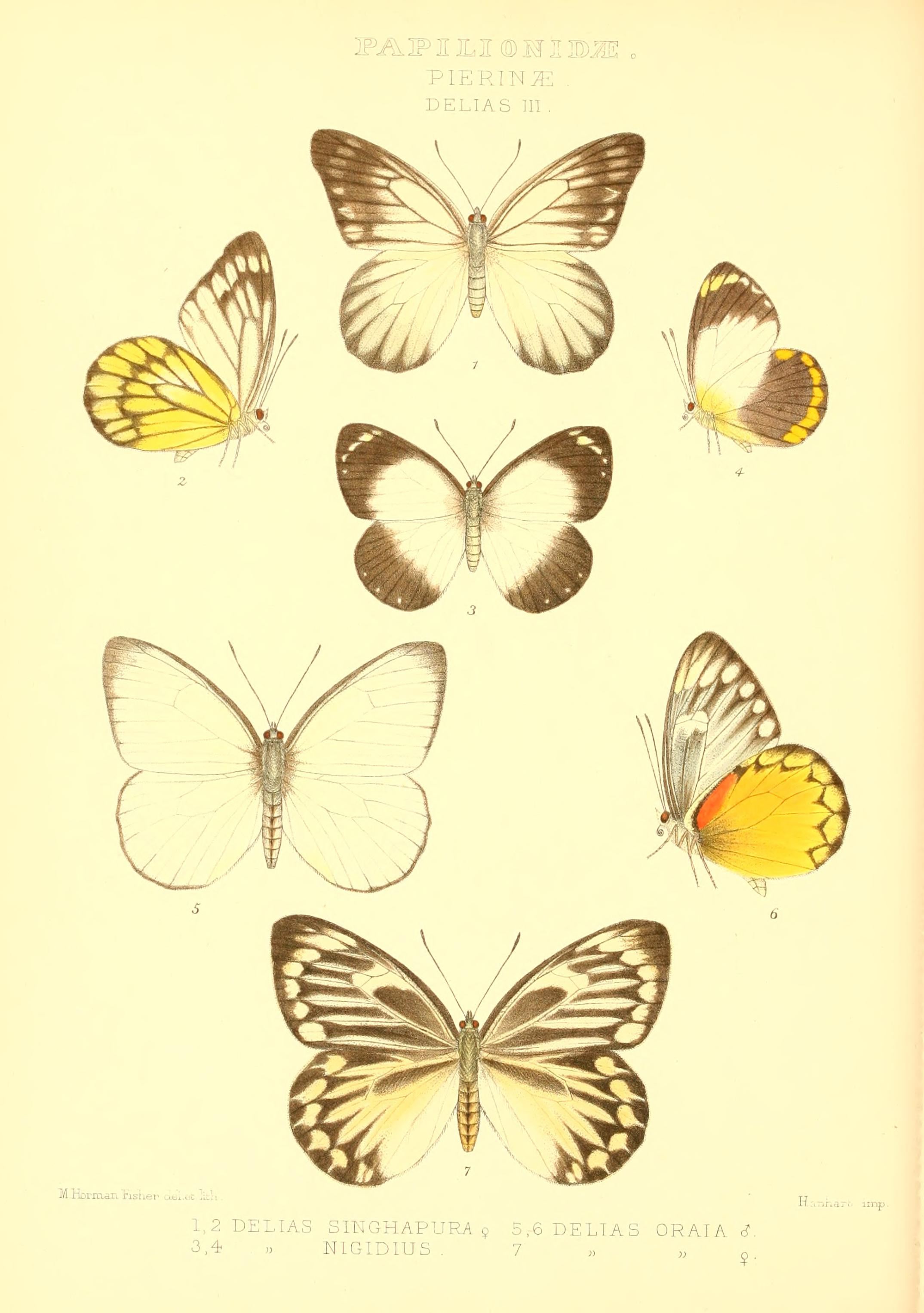
- In Henley Grose-Smith and William Forsell Kirby's Rhopalocera exotica

Scientific classification
- Kingdom: Animalia
- Phylum: Arthropoda
- Clade: Pancrustacea
- Class: Insecta
- Order: Lepidoptera
- Family: Pieridae
- Genus: Delias
- Species: D. singhapura

Binomial name
- Delias singhapura (Wallace, 1867)

Synonyms
- Thyca singhapura Wallace, 1867

= Delias singhapura =

Species of butterfly

Delias singhapura is a butterfly in the family Pieridae.It was described by Alfred Russel Wallace in 1867. It is found in the Indomalayan realm.

== Description ==
Thyca singhapura, n, sp. (PI. VII. fig. 2, $.)

Male.— Wings elongate; above, white, the costal margin and the outer half of the uppers dusky, nearly black at the apex, and with an ill-defined inner edge; lower wings with a narrow interrupted black border behind, within which dusky patches of scales extend a short distance along the nervures. Beneath: upper wings white, the nervures of the upper half black-margined, the apex blackish, leaving a row of six distinct ovate white spots; lower wings bright yellow, the nervures black-bordered, and a rather broad black border round the hind margin enclosing a row of six whitish spots, the inner ones bifid, the outermost yellow-tinged.

Expanse of wings 3.125 inches (79.4 mm).

Hab.—Singapore (Coll. Wall.).

== Subspecies ==
- Delias singhapura singhapura (Singapore, southern Malaysia, southern Peninsular Thailand)
- Delias singhapura acuta Rothschild, 1915 (Sumatra)
- Delias singhapura indistincta Fruhstorfer, 1897 (Borneo)
- Delias singhapura simeuluensis Kotaki, 1992 (Simeulue)
- Delias singhapura tsukadai Nakano, 1993 (Banyak)
- Delias singhapura yusukei Nakano, 1988 (Palawan)
