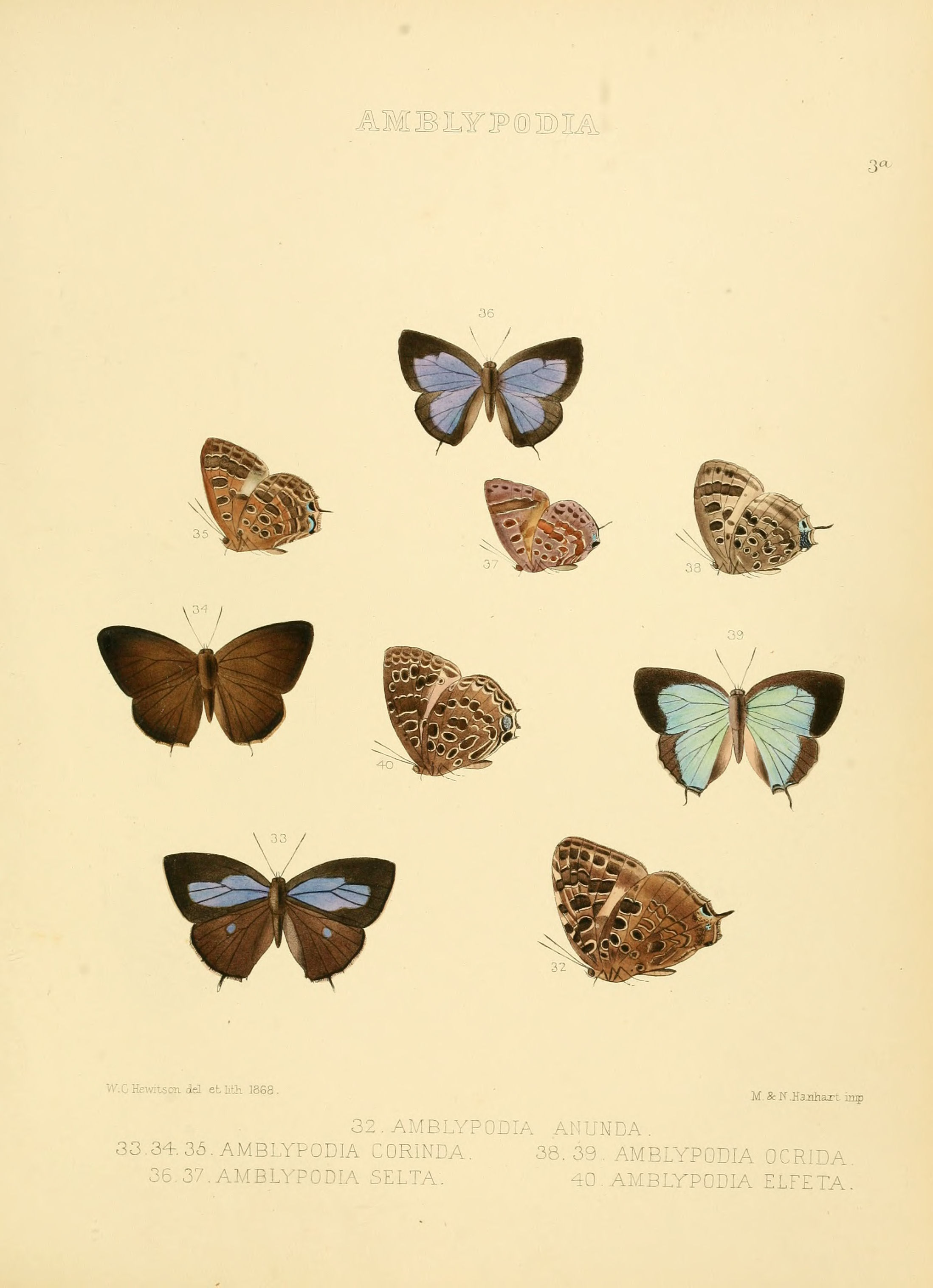
- Plate accompanying the original description Figs. 36, 37

Scientific classification
- Kingdom: Animalia
- Phylum: Arthropoda
- Clade: Pancrustacea
- Class: Insecta
- Order: Lepidoptera
- Family: Lycaenidae
- Genus: Arhopala
- Species: A. selta

Binomial name
- Arhopala selta (Hewitson, 1869)

= Arhopala selta =

Reddish-brown oakblue

Species of butterfly

Arhopala selta or reddish-brown oakblue, is a butterfly in the family Lycaenidae. It was described by William Chapman Hewitson in 1869. It is found in the Indomalayan realm.

== Description ==
Resembles Arhopala agaba to which it is closely allied but the under surface showing a dull earth-brown ground lacks the magnificent violet reflection exhibited by agaba beneath.

== Subspecies ==
- A. s. selta Burma, Mergui, Peninsular Malaya, Thailand, Sumatra
- A. s. constanceae de Nicéville, 1894 Andaman Islands
- A. s. hislopi Eliot, 1962 Malaysia
