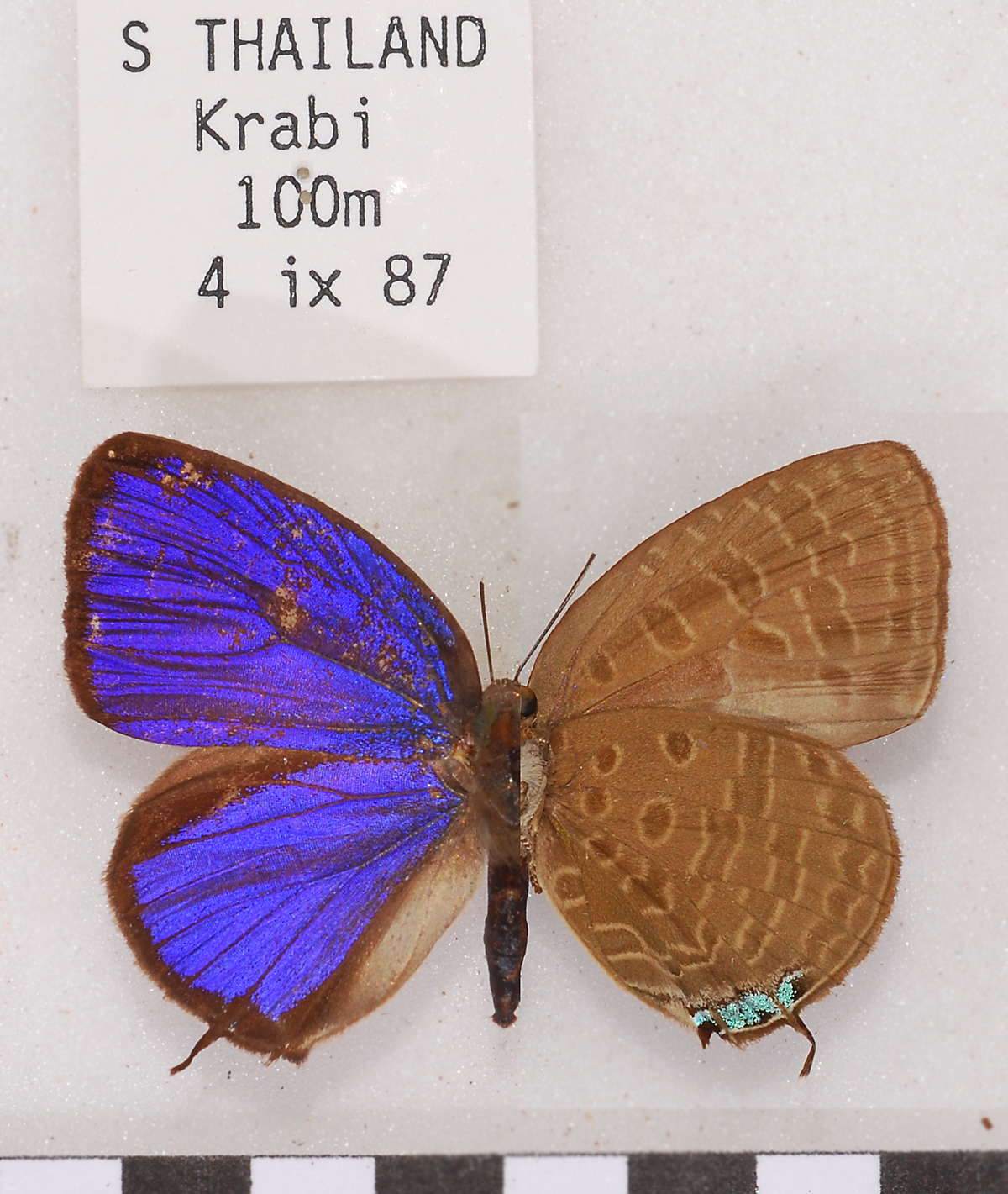

Scientific classification
- Kingdom: Animalia
- Phylum: Arthropoda
- Clade: Pancrustacea
- Class: Insecta
- Order: Lepidoptera
- Family: Lycaenidae
- Genus: Arhopala
- Species: A. ariana

Binomial name
- Arhopala ariana (Evans, 1925)

Synonyms
- Amblypodia ariana Evans, [1925]; Arhopala havilandi wilcocksi Eliot, 1973

= Arhopala ariana =

Species of butterfly

Arhopala ariana is a species of butterfly belonging to the lycaenid family. It was described by William Harry Evans in 1925. It is found in Southeast Asia (Langkawi, Mergui, Burma, and Thailand).

== Subspecies ==
- Arhopala ariana ariana (Langkawi, Mergui, southern Burma, Thailand)
- Arhopala ariana wilcocksi Eliot, 1973 (Langkawi)
