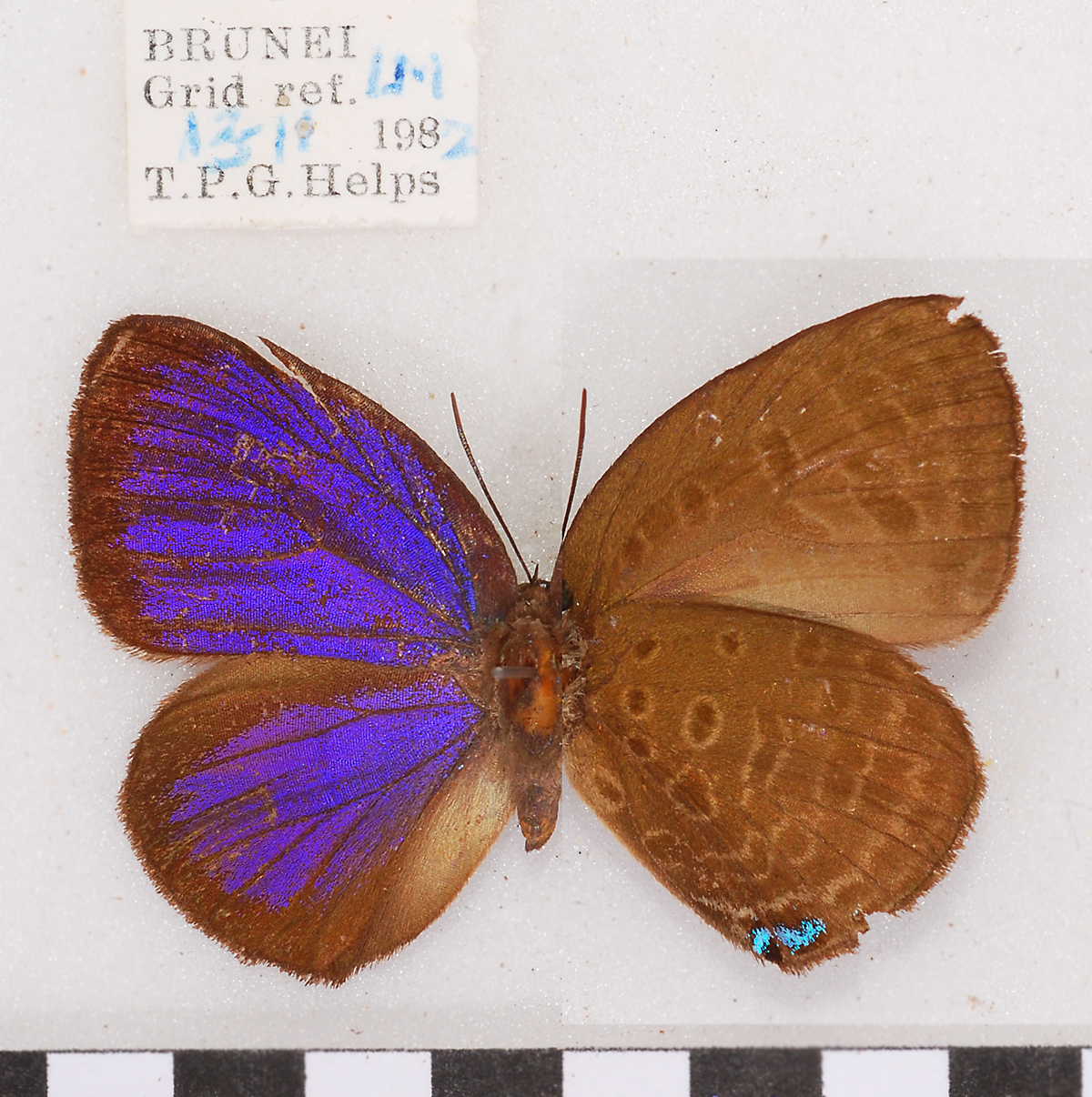

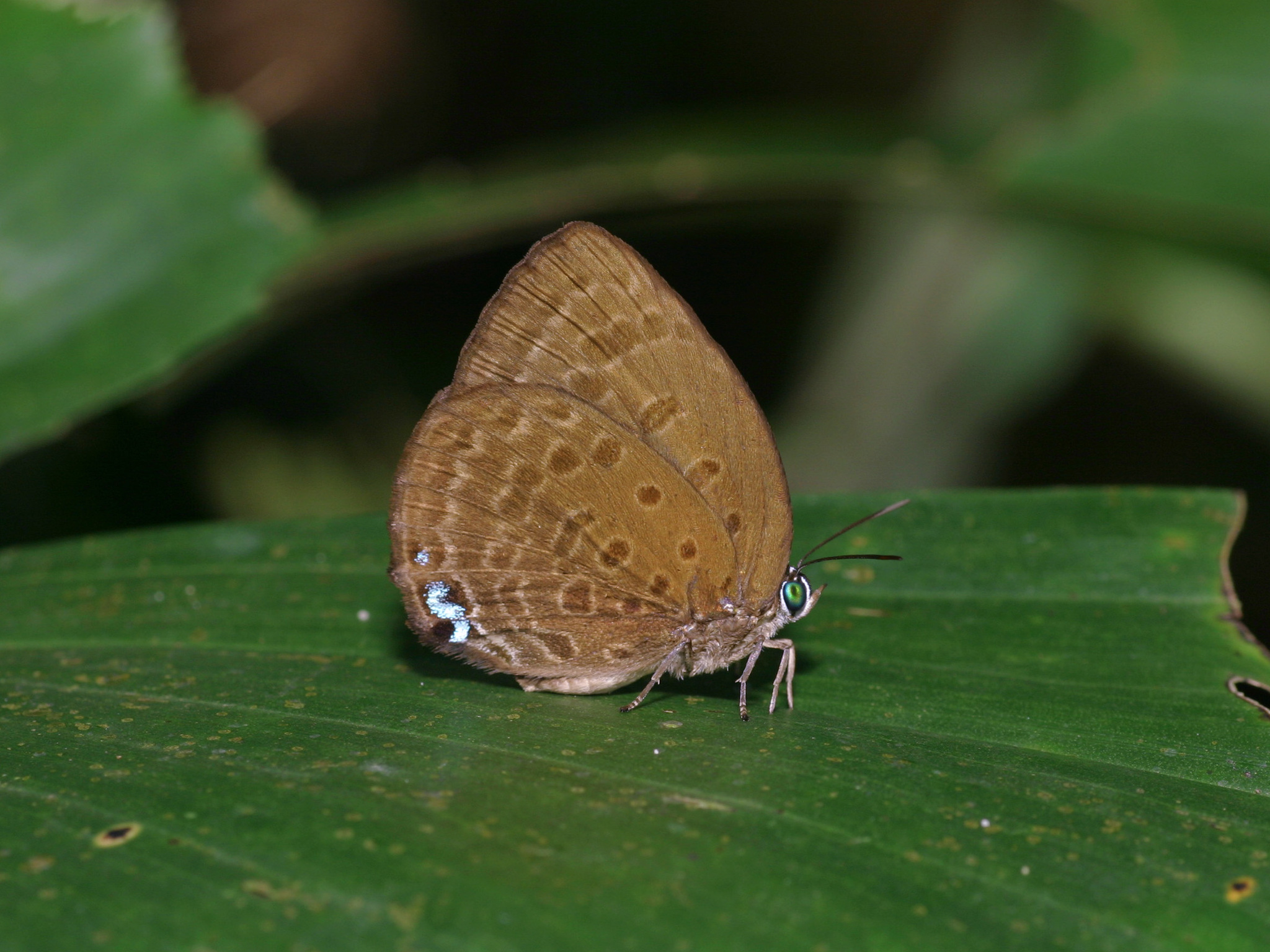
- underside

Scientific classification
- Kingdom: Animalia
- Phylum: Arthropoda
- Clade: Pancrustacea
- Class: Insecta
- Order: Lepidoptera
- Family: Lycaenidae
- Subfamily: Theclinae
- Tribe: Arhopalini
- Genus: Arhopala
- Species: A. major

Binomial name
- Arhopala major (Staudinger, O., 1889)

Synonyms
- Amblypodia agesilaus var. major Staudinger, 1889; Arhopala catori Bethune-Baker, 1903; Arhopala catori parvimaculata Okubo, 1983

= Arhopala major =

Species of butterfly

Arhopala major is a species of butterfly belonging to the lycaenid family described by Otto Staudinger in 1889. It is found in Southeast Asia (Sumatra, Peninsular Malaya, Borneo, Nias, Tioman).

(catori) Extremely similar to Arhopala agesilaus, above almost entirely the same, but beneath the postmedian band of the hindwing is almost entirely broken up into single small spots. Above the cell only one ring-spot is distinct.

== Subspecies ==
- Arhopala major major (Sumatra, Peninsular Malaya, Borneo, Nias)
- Arhopala major parvimaculata Okubo, 1983 (Tioman)
