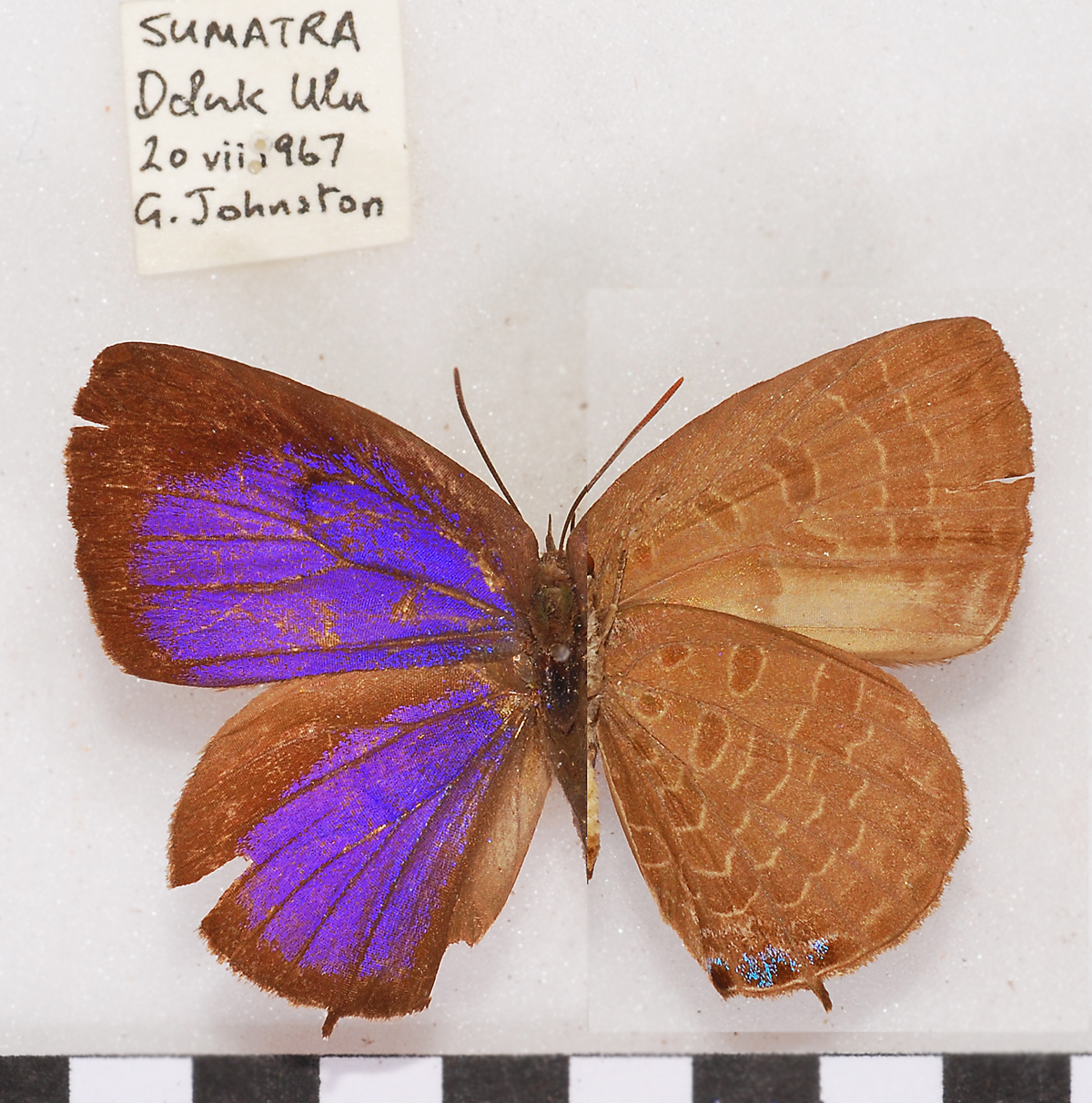

Scientific classification
- Kingdom: Animalia
- Phylum: Arthropoda
- Clade: Pancrustacea
- Class: Insecta
- Order: Lepidoptera
- Family: Lycaenidae
- Genus: Arhopala
- Species: A. buddha

Binomial name
- Arhopala buddha (Bethune-Baker, 1903)

Synonyms
- Amblypodia cooperi Evans, [1925]; Arhopala gana Corbet, 1941; Arhopala siberuta Corbet, 1941; Arhopala whiteheadi Corbet, 1946

= Arhopala buddha =

Species of butterfly

Arhopala buddha is a species of butterfly belonging to the lycaenid family described by George Thomas Bethune-Baker in 1903. It is found in Southeast Asia (Burma, Mergui, Peninsular Malaya, southern Thailand, Sumatra, Bangka, Borneo, Siberut, the Philippines and Java).

== Description ==
Above lustrous light blue with a black marginal band in the male of more than 2 mm width, exhibits beneath the postmedian band of the forewing only feebly bent.

== Subspecies ==
- Arhopala buddha buddha (Java)
- Arhopala buddha cooperi (Evans, [1925]) (southern Burma, Mergui, Peninsular Malaysia, southern Thailand, Sumatra, Bangka, Siberut, Philippines)
- Arhopala buddha whiteheadi Corbet, 1946 (Borneo)
