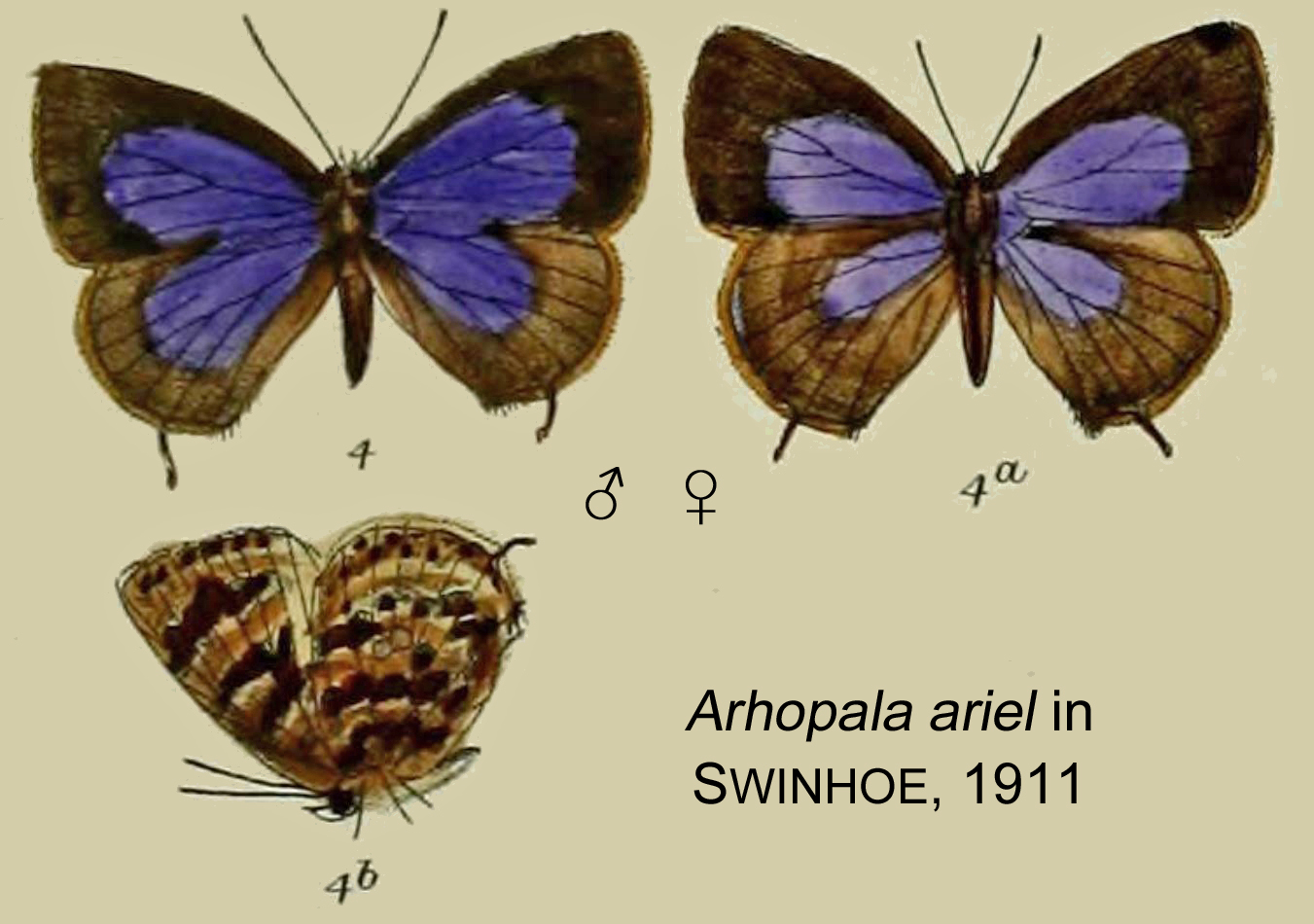
- Arhopala ariel in Swinhoe

Scientific classification
- Kingdom: Animalia
- Phylum: Arthropoda
- Clade: Pancrustacea
- Class: Insecta
- Order: Lepidoptera
- Family: Lycaenidae
- Genus: Arhopala
- Species: A. ariel

Binomial name
- Arhopala ariel (Doherty, 1891)

= Arhopala ariel =

Species of butterfly

Arhopala ariel is a butterfly in the family Lycaenidae. It was described by William Doherty in 1891. It is found in the Indomalayan realm (Assam, Peninsular Malaya, Thailand, and Borneo).

ariel is smaller [than ammon, beneath still more variegated, above more radiantly blue, otherwise very similar to ammon which it seems to represent in the north of Indo-China. — asakurae Mats. [now Arhopala birmana asakurae (Matsumura, 1910) ] even goes as far as Formosa. Specimens from there show a more leaden-bluish upper surface with a black marginal band of 2.5 mm width, and beneath they already approximate the Indian paraganesa (147 f) on which Moore founded his genus Acesina.
