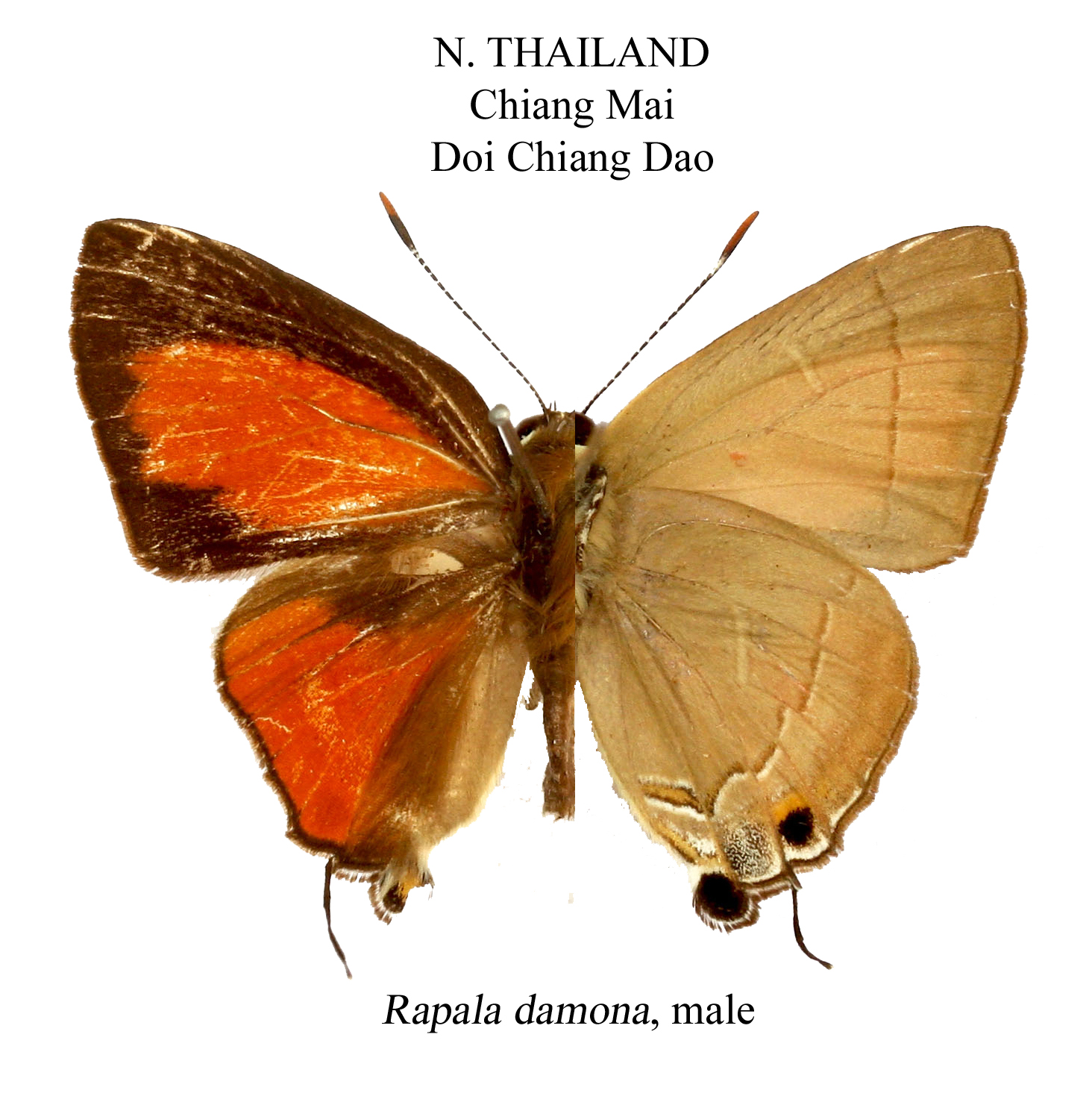

Scientific classification
- Domain: Eukaryota
- Kingdom: Animalia
- Phylum: Arthropoda
- Class: Insecta
- Order: Lepidoptera
- Family: Lycaenidae
- Genus: Rapala
- Species: R. damona

Binomial name
- Rapala damona C. Swinhoe, 1890.

Synonyms
- Rapala rubicunda Evans, [1925]

= Rapala damona =

Species of butterfly

Rapala damona is a butterfly in the family Lycaenidae. It was described by Charles Swinhoe in 1890. It is found in the Indomalayan realm, where it has been recorded from the Andamans, northern India, Myanmar, from Thailand to Peninsular Malaysia, Singapore, Sumatra, Java and Lombok.
