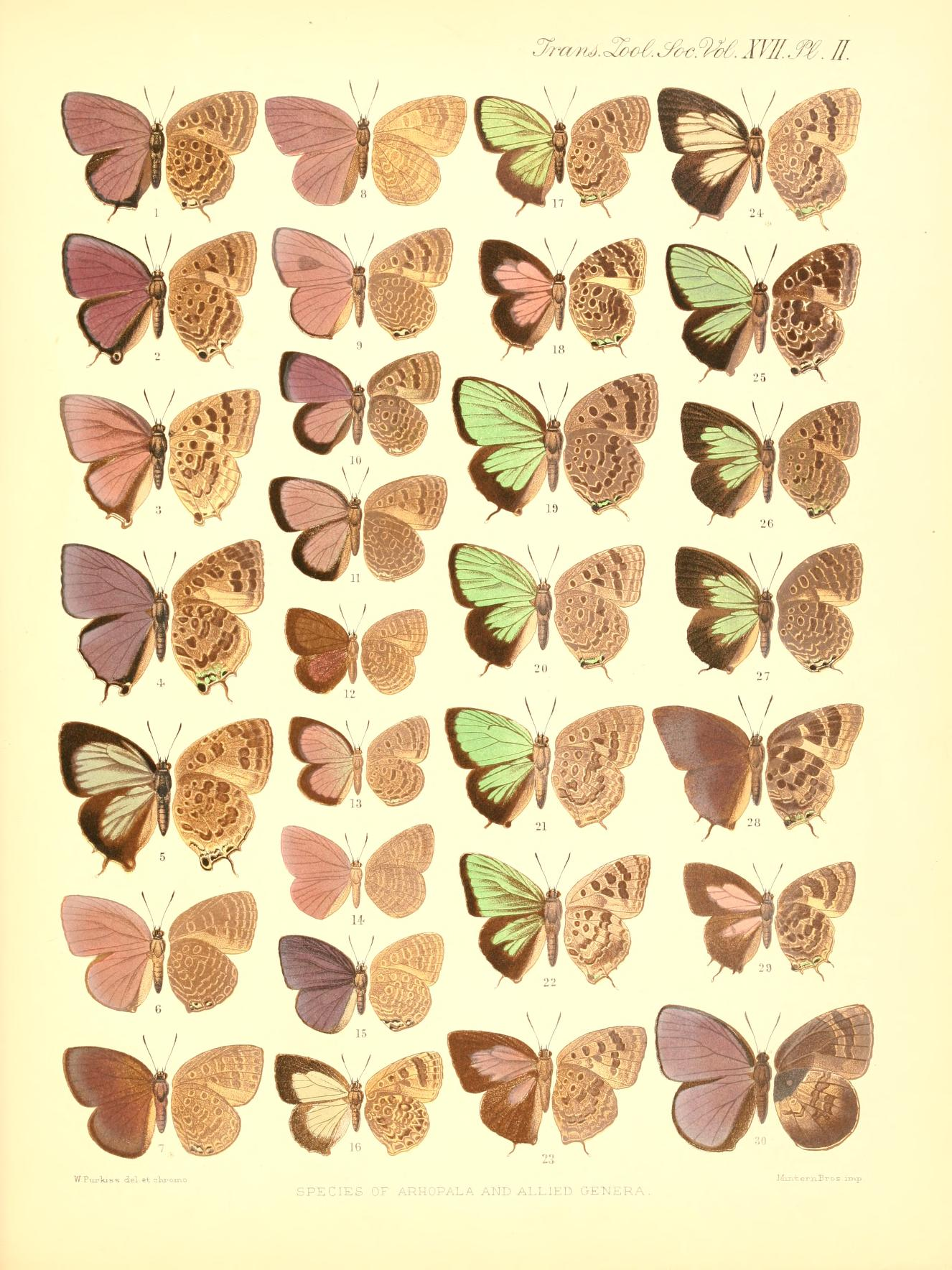
- Arhopala nicevillei in Bethune Baker

Scientific classification
- Kingdom: Animalia
- Phylum: Arthropoda
- Clade: Pancrustacea
- Class: Insecta
- Order: Lepidoptera
- Family: Lycaenidae
- Genus: Arhopala
- Species: A. nicevillei

Binomial name
- Arhopala nicevillei (Bethune-Baker, 1903

= Arhopala nicevillei =

Species of butterfly

Arhopala nicevillei is a butterfly in the family Lycaenidae. It was described by George Thomas Bethune-Baker in 1903. It is found in the Indomalayan realm (Bhutan, Assam, Manipur, Burma, Thailand, and Vietnam). The specific name honours Lionel de Niceville.

== Description ==
A. nicevillei B.-Bak. (148 d) is similar to the Arhopala silhetensis, but above lighter violettish-blue, the forewing much more narrowly bordered with dark, under surface lighter and warming into grey, the very dark spots being very prominent, whereas in silhetensis they are almost extinct. The anal lobe is here as long again as in silhetensis; also the small tail, which is probably broken off in the figured specimen, is longer.
