= Arhopala paralea =

Glazed oakblue

Scientific classification
- Kingdom: Animalia
- Phylum: Arthropoda
- Clade: Pancrustacea
- Class: Insecta
- Order: Lepidoptera
- Family: Lycaenidae
- Genus: Arhopala
- Species: A. paralea

Binomial name
- Arhopala paralea (Evans, [1925])

Synonyms
- Amblypodia paralea Evans, [1925]

Species of butterfly

Arhopala paralea, the glazed oakblue, (sometimes in Amblypodia) is a small butterfly found in India that belongs to the lycaenids or blues family.

== Range ==
The butterfly occurs in India from Manipur to Shan states.

== Status ==
It was considered rare by William Harry Evans in 1932.

== See also ==
- List of butterflies of India (Lycaenidae)
