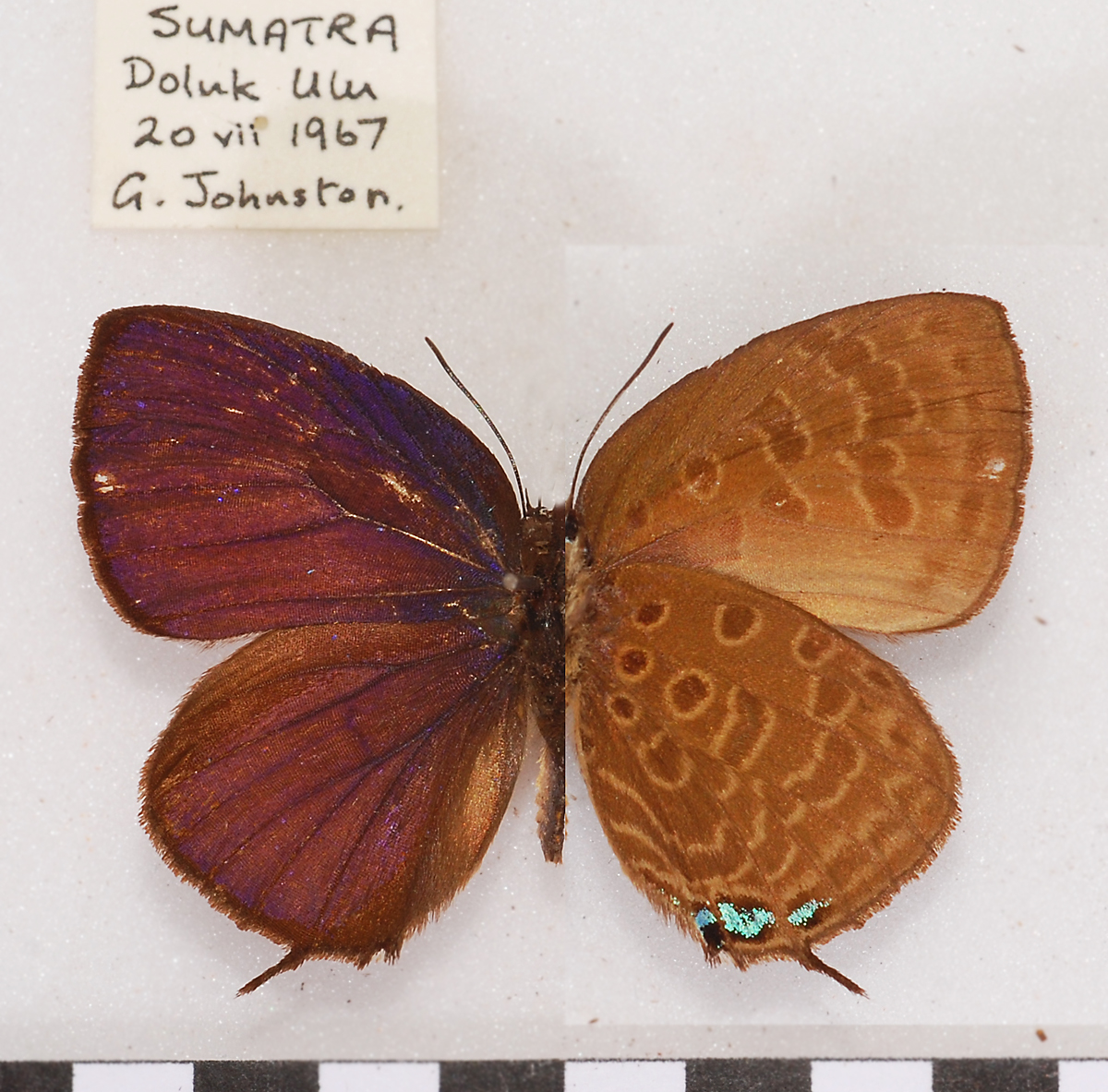

Scientific classification
- Kingdom: Animalia
- Phylum: Arthropoda
- Clade: Pancrustacea
- Class: Insecta
- Order: Lepidoptera
- Family: Lycaenidae
- Genus: Arhopala
- Species: A. delta

Binomial name
- Arhopala delta (Evans, 1957)

Synonyms
- Narathura delta Evans, 1957

= Arhopala delta =

Species of butterfly

Arhopala delta is a species of butterfly belonging to the lycaenid family described by William Harry Evans in 1957. It is found in Southeast Asia (Peninsular Malaya, Sumatra and Borneo).
