= Arhopala alax =

Silky oakblue

Scientific classification
- Kingdom: Animalia
- Phylum: Arthropoda
- Clade: Pancrustacea
- Class: Insecta
- Order: Lepidoptera
- Family: Lycaenidae
- Genus: Arhopala
- Species: A. alax

Binomial name
- Arhopala alax (Evans, 1932)

Synonyms
- Amblypodia alax Evans, 1932

Species of butterfly

Arhopala alax, the silky oakblue, (sometimes placed in Amblypodia) is a small butterfly found in India that belongs to the lycaenids or blues family.

== Range ==
The butterfly has been found in India from Manipur onto Dawnas.

== Status ==
William Harry Evans reported that the species was common in 1932.

== See also ==
- List of butterflies of India (Lycaenidae)
