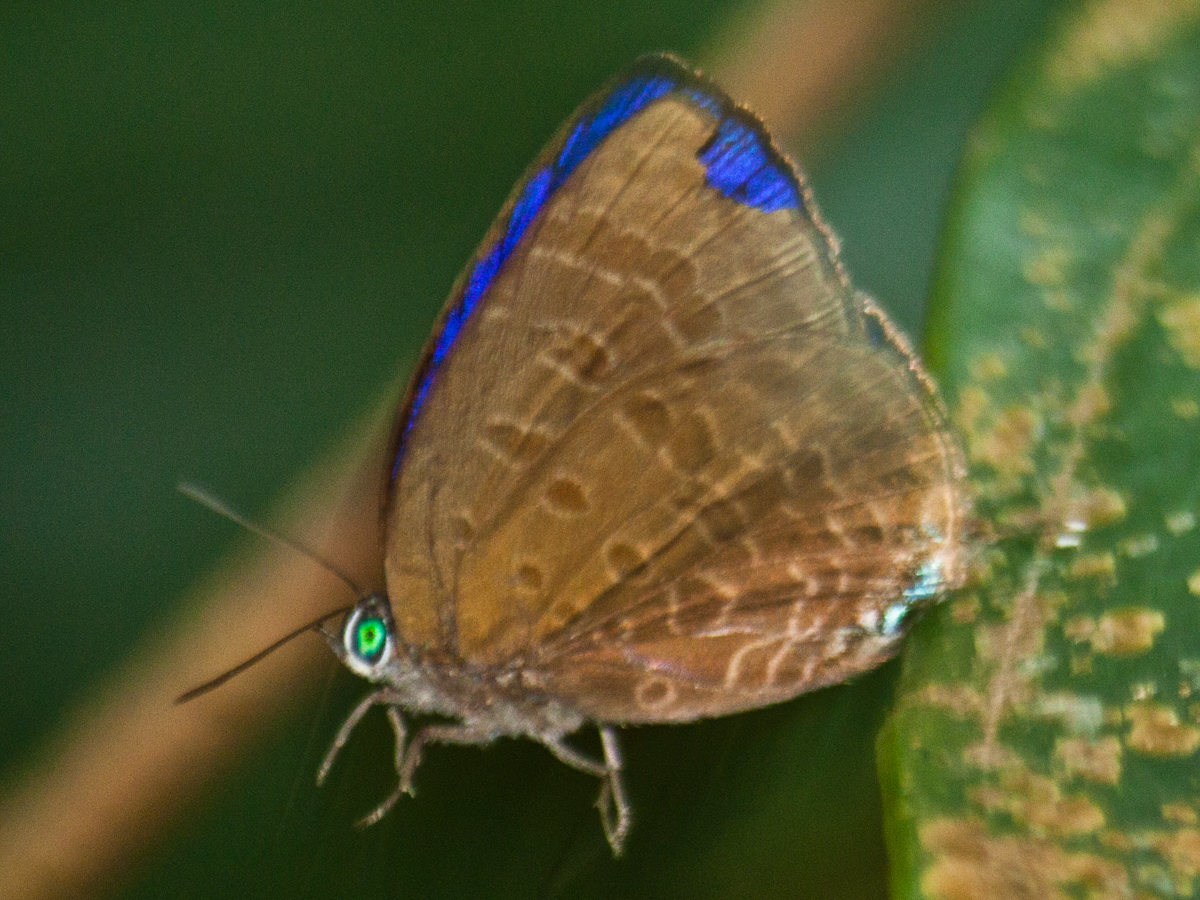

Scientific classification
- Kingdom: Animalia
- Phylum: Arthropoda
- Clade: Pancrustacea
- Class: Insecta
- Order: Lepidoptera
- Family: Lycaenidae
- Subfamily: Theclinae
- Tribe: Arhopalini
- Genus: Arhopala
- Species: A. milleri

Binomial name
- Arhopala milleri Corbet, 1941

Synonyms
- Narathura ralanda ridleyi

= Arhopala milleri =

Species of butterfly

Arhopala milleri is a butterfly in the family Lycaenidae. It was described by Alexander Steven Corbet in 1941. It is found in the Indomalayan realm.

== Description ==
The upper side is dark purple with minimal border. The underside is dull-brown, as is common for most Arhopala butterflies.
