= Heliophorus hybrida =

Hybrid sapphire

Scientific classification
- Kingdom: Animalia
- Phylum: Arthropoda
- Class: Insecta
- Order: Lepidoptera
- Family: Lycaenidae
- Genus: Heliophorus
- Species: H. hybrida

Binomial name
- Heliophorus hybrida (Tytler 1912)

Species of butterfly

Heliophorus hybrida, the hybrid sapphire, is a small butterfly found in India that belongs to the lycaenids or blues family.

== See also ==
- List of butterflies of India
- List of butterflies of India (Lycaenidae)
