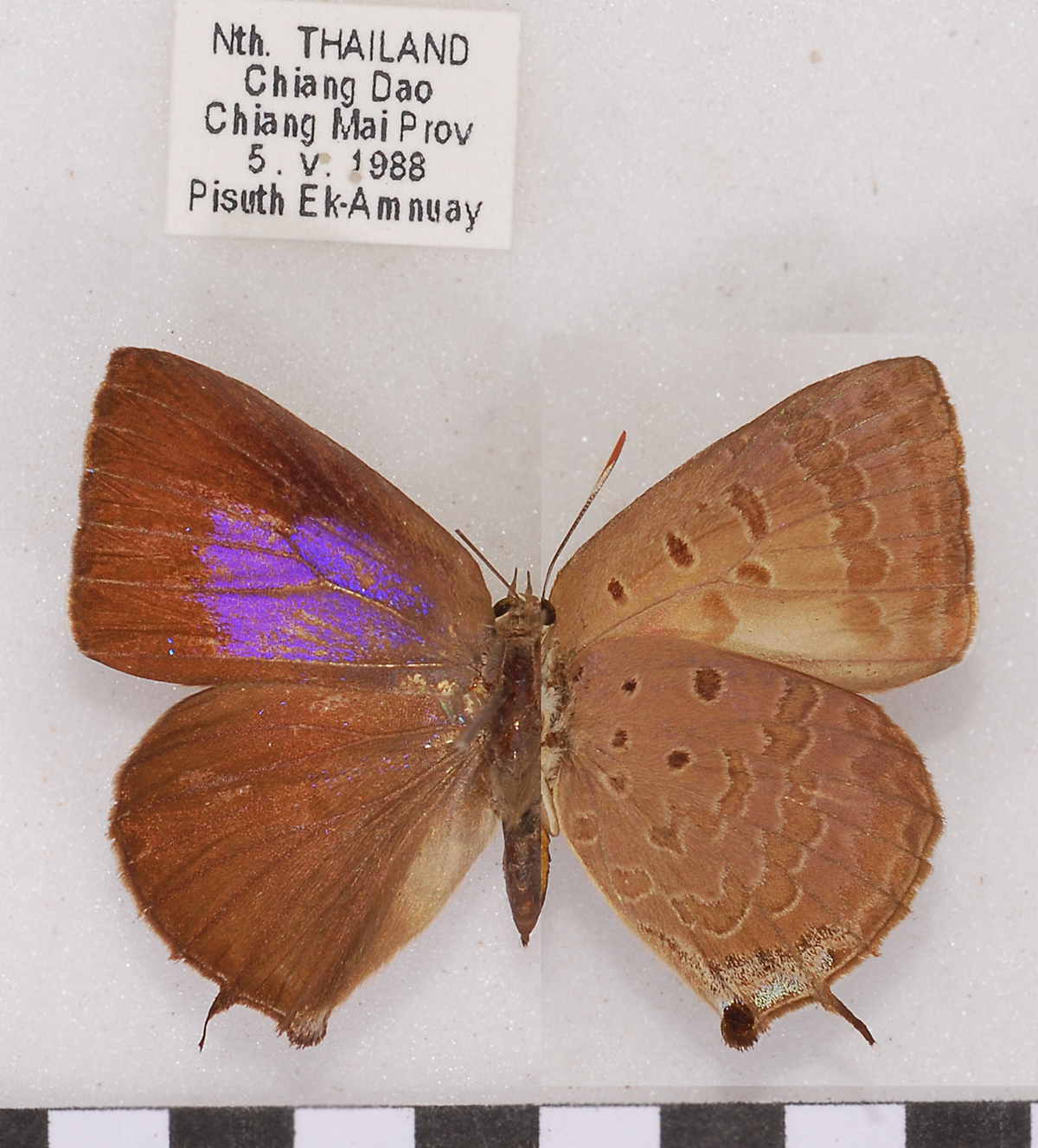

Scientific classification
- Kingdom: Animalia
- Phylum: Arthropoda
- Clade: Pancrustacea
- Class: Insecta
- Order: Lepidoptera
- Family: Lycaenidae
- Genus: Arhopala
- Species: A. barami

Binomial name
- Arhopala barami (Bethune-Baker, 1903)

Synonyms
- Arhopala penanga Corbet, 1941

= Arhopala barami =

Species of butterfly

Arhopala barami is a species of butterfly belonging to the lycaenid family described by George Thomas Bethune-Baker in 1903. It is found in Southeast Asia (Peninsular Malaya, Singapore, Burma, Mergui, Thailand and Borneo).

== Description ==
The male is more dark blue than lilac and has a black distal margin being in some places rather broad (as much as 4 mm). On the under surface the bands and spots are very regular, the postmedian band of the forewing is only slightly strangulated in the centre, in contrast with [related forms]. Female lighter more violettish-blue; behind the cell from the costa a black spot penetrates into the blue.

== Subspecies ==
- Arhopala barami barami (Borneo)
- Arhopala barami woodii Ollenbach, 1921 (southern Burma, Mergui, southern Thailand)
- Arhopala barami penanga Corbet, 1941 (Peninsular Malaysia, Singapore)
