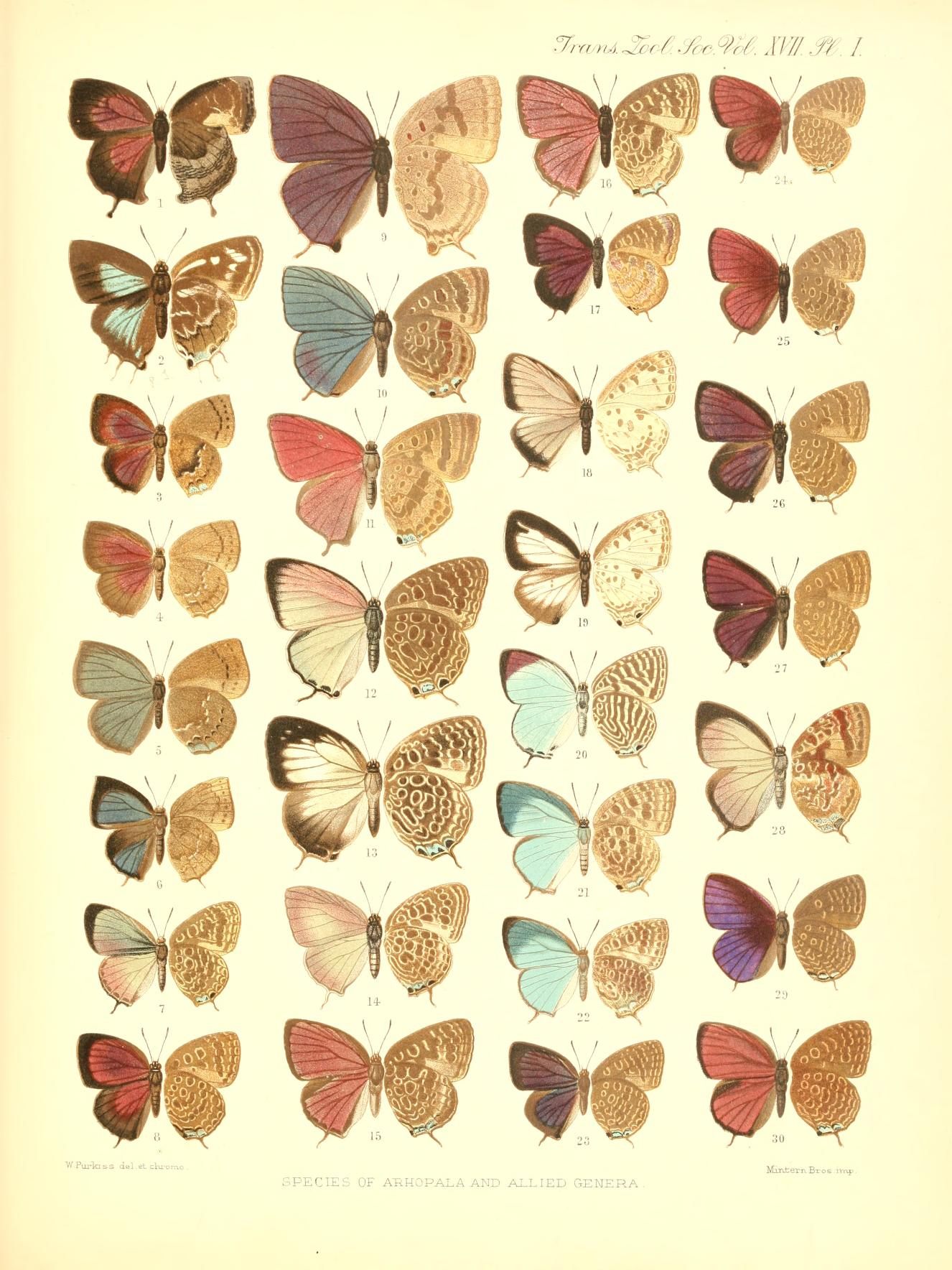
- Arhopala phaenops in Bethune Baker (male, figure 27)

Scientific classification
- Kingdom: Animalia
- Phylum: Arthropoda
- Clade: Pancrustacea
- Class: Insecta
- Order: Lepidoptera
- Family: Lycaenidae
- Genus: Arhopala
- Species: A. phaenops

Binomial name
- Arhopala phaenops C. & R.Felder, [1865]

= Arhopala phaenops =

Species of butterfly

Arhopala phaenops is a butterfly in the family Lycaenidae. It was described by Cajetan Felder and Rudolf Felder in 1865. It is found in the Indomalayan realm.

A. phaenops Fldr. is similar to Arhopala adorea, but it is smaller and of a brighter blue, These species are discernible by their under surface, where the small rings of the proximal half of the hindwing are very small in A. phaenops and therefore more remote from each other when compared with A. adorea,. Further, the transverse bands in the marginal area of the forewing, which in A. adorea are interrupted on the median, are unbroken in A. phaenops.

== Subspecies ==
- A. p. phaenops Philippines
- A. p. detrita (Staudinger, 1889) Palawan
- A. p. sandakani Druce, 1896 Borneo, Sumatra, Peninsular Malayais - still brighter blue on the upper surface of the male; the proximal ring-spots are here likewise very small, but filled with a much darker colour, in the same way as the transverse bands. Above the black margin of the wings is somewhat broader, about 1.5 to 2 mm in the male. The postmedian band of the forewing beneath is here not only interrupted, but the two ends of the interruption are also distant from each other.
- A. p. termerion Fruhstorfer, 1914 Bazilan
- A. p. aytonia Fruhstorfer, 1914 Java
- A. p. buruensis Holland, 1900 Buru, Obi
