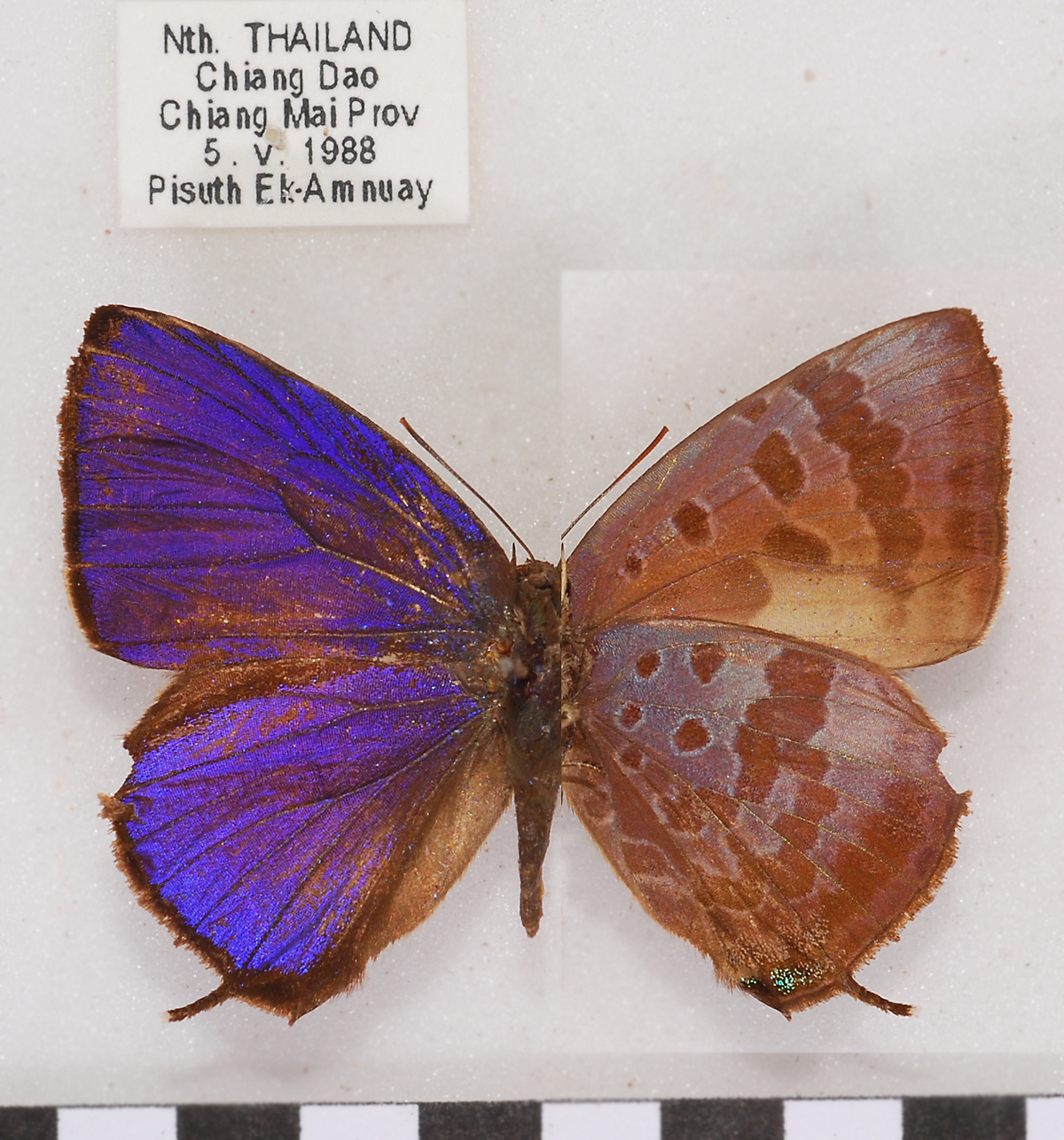

Scientific classification
- Kingdom: Animalia
- Phylum: Arthropoda
- Clade: Pancrustacea
- Class: Insecta
- Order: Lepidoptera
- Family: Lycaenidae
- Genus: Arhopala
- Species: A. agaba

Binomial name
- Arhopala agaba (Hewitson, 1862)

Synonyms
- Amblypodia agaba Hewitson, 1862

= Arhopala agaba =

Purple-glazed oakblue

Species of butterfly

Arhopala agaba, the purple-glazed oakblue, (sometimes placed in Amblypodia) is a small butterfly found from India to Thailand, Langkawi, Indochina, Peninsular Malaysia to the Philippines and Sumatra that belongs to the lycaenids or blues family. The species was first described by William Chapman Hewitson in 1862.

== Description ==
The male is above darker and duller blue than Arhopala havilandi; female violettish blue with a black margin being particularly broad at the apex of the forewing and at the distal margin of the hindwing. Beneath the markings are more conspicuous in the violettish-brown ground and they are also somewhat differently placed.

== Range in India ==
The butterfly occurs in India from Manipur to northern Myanmar and from Karens to southern Myanmar. It is not rare from Karens to southern Myanmar, but rare elsewhere.

== See also ==
- Lycaenidae
- List of butterflies of India (Lycaenidae)
