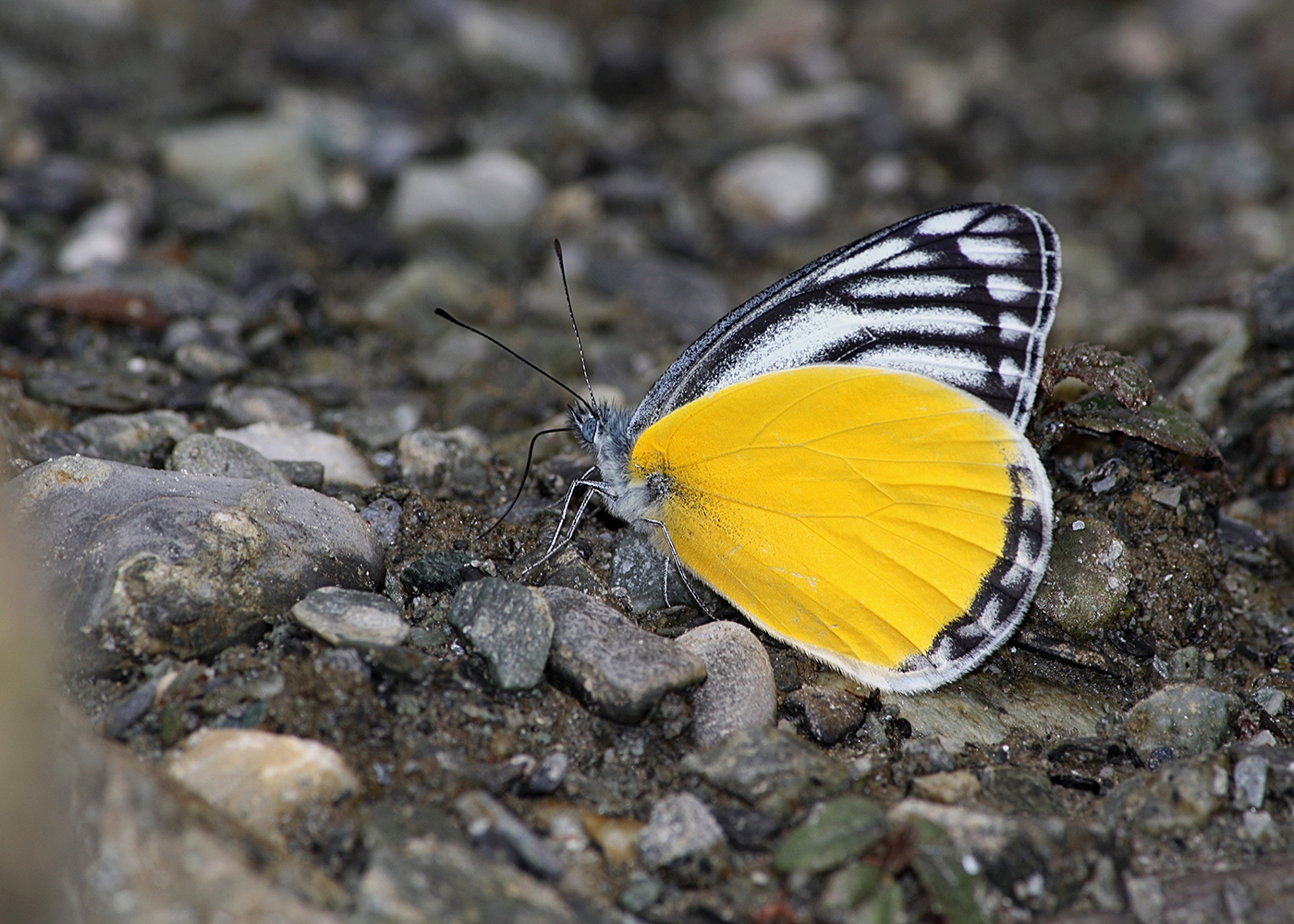
- Males (left) and females (right)

Scientific classification
- Kingdom: Animalia
- Phylum: Arthropoda
- Class: Insecta
- Order: Lepidoptera
- Family: Pieridae
- Genus: Delias
- Species: D. agostina

Binomial name
- Delias agostina Hewitson, 1852

= Delias agostina =

Yellow Jezebel

Species of butterfly

Delias agostina, the yellow Jezebel is a medium-sized butterfly of the family Pieridae, that is, the yellows and whites.

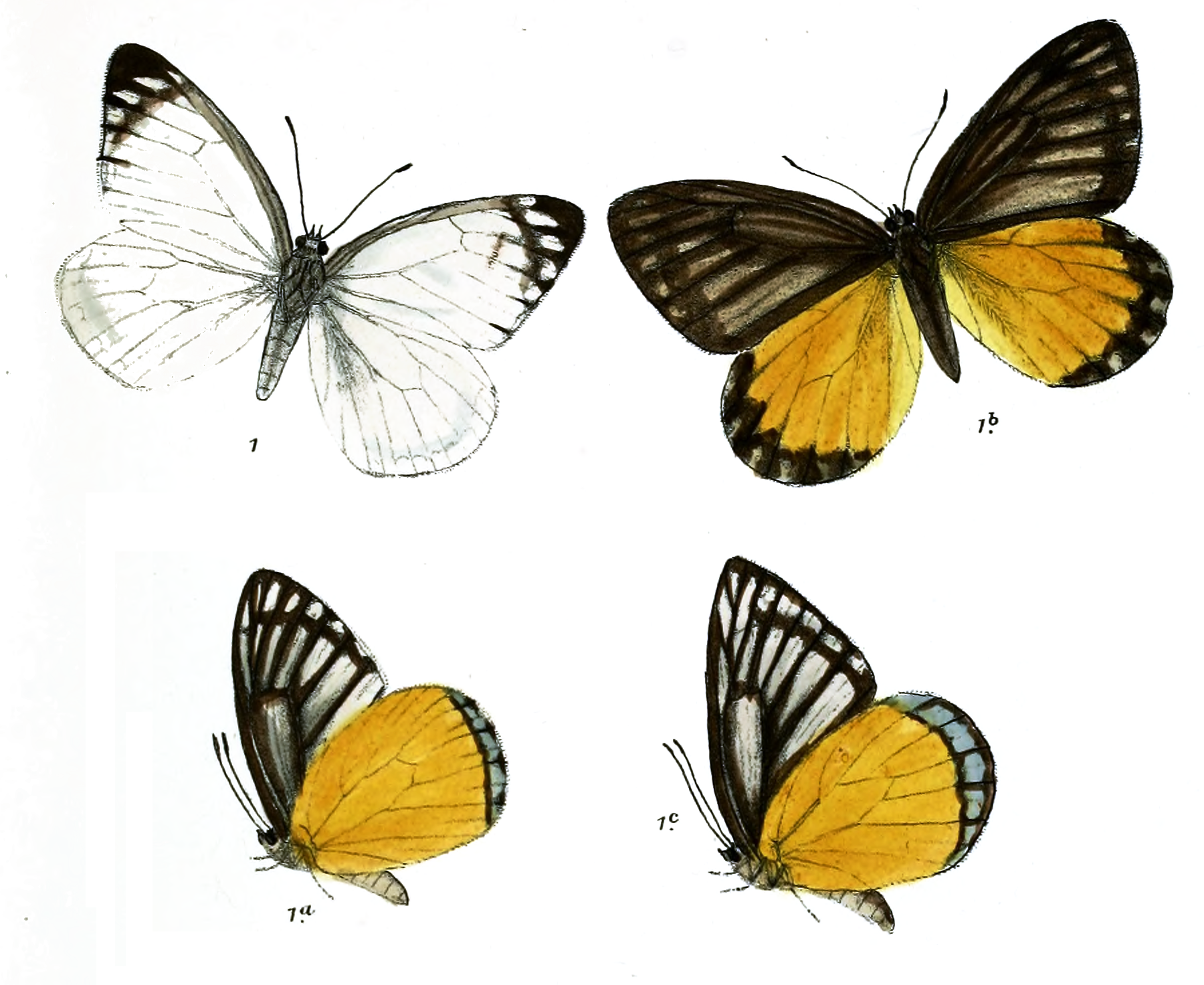

== Description ==
Original Upperside cream colour, posterior wing more tinted than the other. Anterior wing with the costal margin grey. The apex, to beyond the middle of the outer margin, black, marked with a row of five white spots. Posterior wing with the border of the underside seen through. Underside. Anterior wing with all the nervures broadly black. Posterior wing of a rich orange yellow, with a submarginal line of black and marginal spots of the same colour. Expan. 2-8/10 in. Hab. East India. In the Collections of W. W. Saunders and W. C. Hewitson.

This beautiful butterfly is nearly allied to P. Eucharis of Drury and Cramer.

== See also ==
- List of butterflies of India
- List of butterflies of India (Pieridae)
