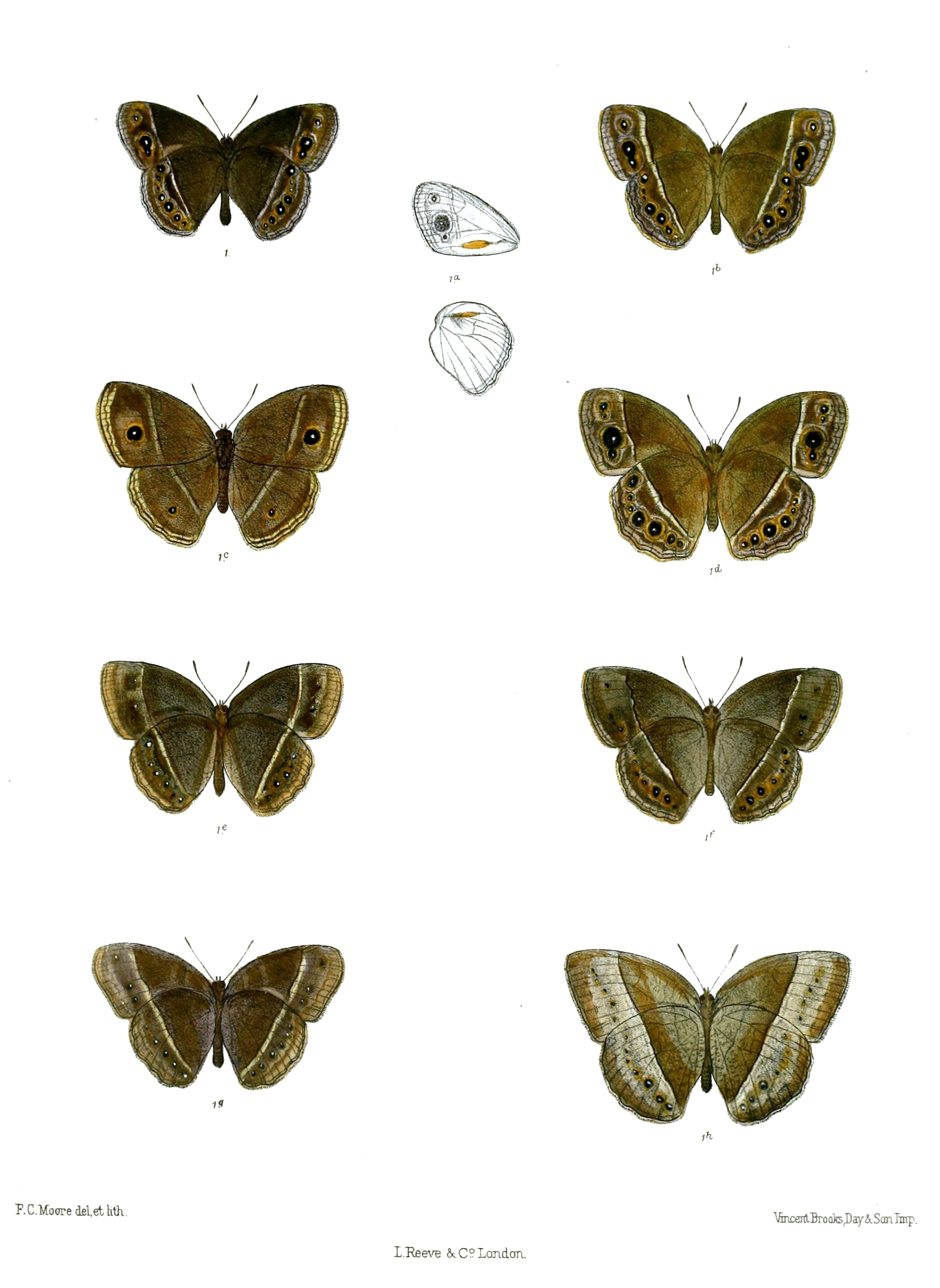

Scientific classification
- Kingdom: Animalia
- Phylum: Arthropoda
- Clade: Pancrustacea
- Class: Insecta
- Order: Lepidoptera
- Family: Nymphalidae
- Genus: Mycalesis
- Species: M. subdita

Binomial name
- Mycalesis subdita (Moore, [1890])

Synonyms
- Mycalesis visala subdita (but see text)

= Mycalesis subdita =

Tamil bushbrown

Species of butterfly

Mycalesis subdita, the Tamil bushbrown, is a satyrine butterfly found in south India and Sri Lanka. It is not resolved whether this is a good species or is a subspecies of Mycalesis visala.

== Description ==
Closely resembles in both seasonal forms Mycalesis mineus. The male can be discriminated by the sex-mark on the underside of the forewing: this is brown or ochraceous brown as in M. perseoides but very much longer and broader, extending to but not going beyond the transverse band crossing the wings.

Wet-Season Brood: Male and female. Upperside dark olivescent ochreous-brown, with a very faint pale transverse discal narrow fascia, and distinctly paler marginal lines; both most apparent in the female. Cilia cinereous-ochreous. Forewing more rounded at the apex than in Mycalesis visala; with a large prominent median ocellus. Hind-wing with one, occasionally two, small slightly defined median ocelli. Underside dark greyish ochreous-brown or fuliginous-brown; with a well-defined whitish transverse discal band, and marginal ochreous lines. Forewing with one small subapical ocellus and two conjoined lower median ocelli, the latter pair being disposed one between the middle and lower medians (which is the largest) and the other between the lower median and the submedian vein; the lowest ocellus, i.e., that between the median and submedian, being small and always present in both selves; both the upper and lower series are separately encircled by a pale greyish-white outer line. In some specimens, but rarely, there is a minute more or less complete contiguous ocellus between the middle and upper medians, and encircled within the pale outer line of the lower series. Again, rarely also a specimen of the female ocours, in which there is an additional upper minute ocellus (making six) disposed above the upper radial veinlet. Hindwing with seven prominent black ocelli, encompassed by a greyish-white wavy outer line. Male, on the underside of the forewing, with an elongated glandular patch of ochreous yellow scales upon the submedian vein extending from its middle to the discal pale band; and on the hindwing, above, with a subbasal tuft of pale hairs exserted or overlapping a glandular patch of ochreous yellow scales. Dry-Season Brood: Male and female. Upperside similar to the wet-season brood. Underside paler in colour, either of a greyish or ochreous brown; the transverse discal whitish line very narrow, but distinct; the ordinary subbasal transverse wavy line generally apparent. Forewing with five very small ocelli disposed as in the ocellated brood, those of the female minute or anteriorly represented by white dots, the lowest one situated between the lower median and submedian vein being always present or indicated in both sexes. Hindwing with the ocelli also minute or anteriorly indicated by a white dot. Male with fin elongated glandular patch of yelloiv scales on underside of the forewing, and a yellow patch overlapped by the subcostal tuft on upperside of the hindwing.

— Frederic Moore, Lepidoptera Indica. Vol. I
