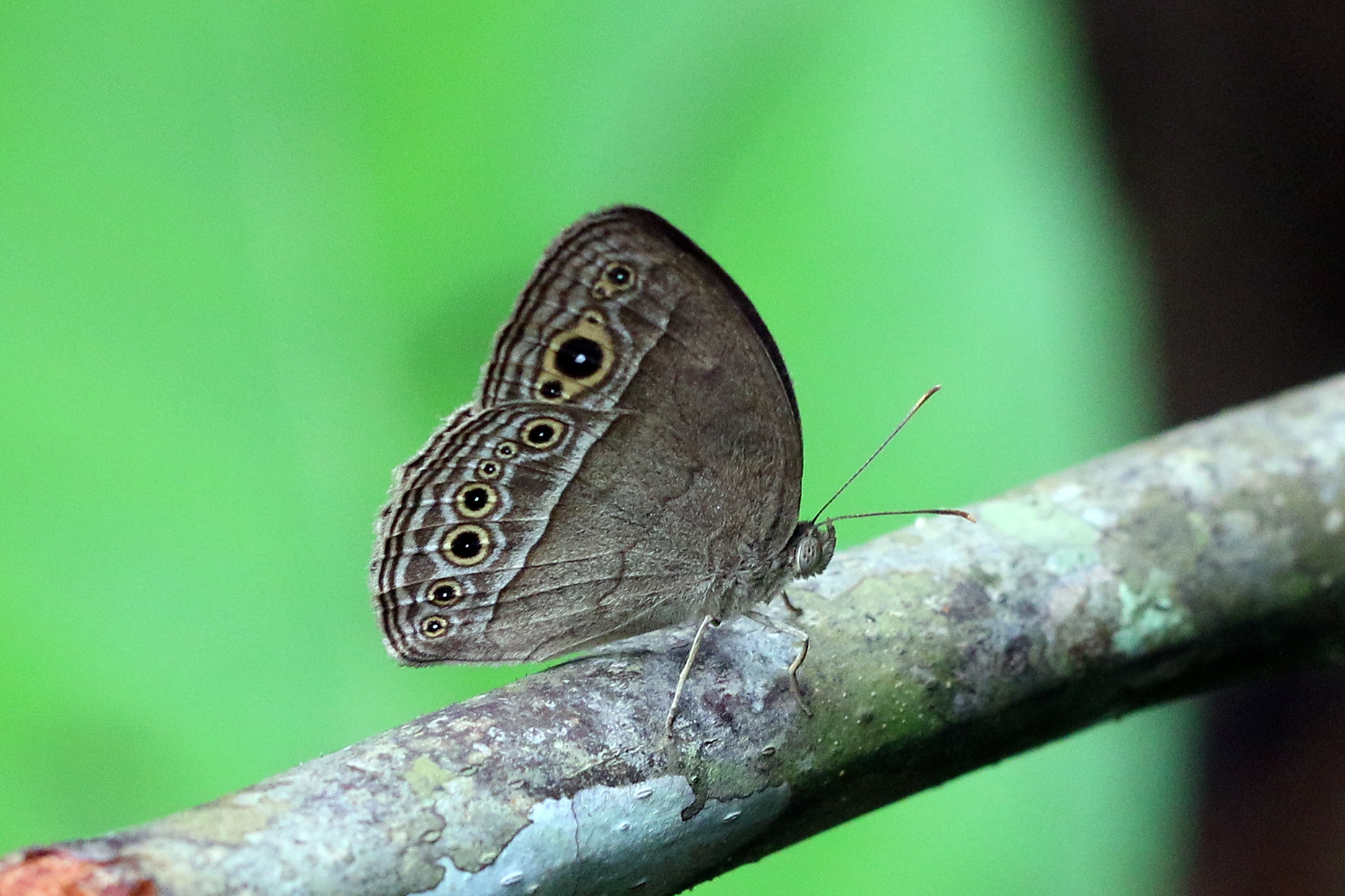
- Mycalesis visala phamis, Singapore

Scientific classification
- Kingdom: Animalia
- Phylum: Arthropoda
- Clade: Pancrustacea
- Class: Insecta
- Order: Lepidoptera
- Family: Nymphalidae
- Genus: Mycalesis
- Species: M. visala

Binomial name
- Mycalesis visala Moore, 1858

Synonyms
- Mycalesis andamana Moore; Mycalesis orcha Evans, 1912; Mycalesis neovisala Fruhstorfer, 1908

= Mycalesis visala =

Species of butterfly

Mycalesis visala, the long-brand bushbrown, is a species of satyrine butterfly found in south Asia. It might include the Tamil bushbrown as a subspecies.

== Description ==
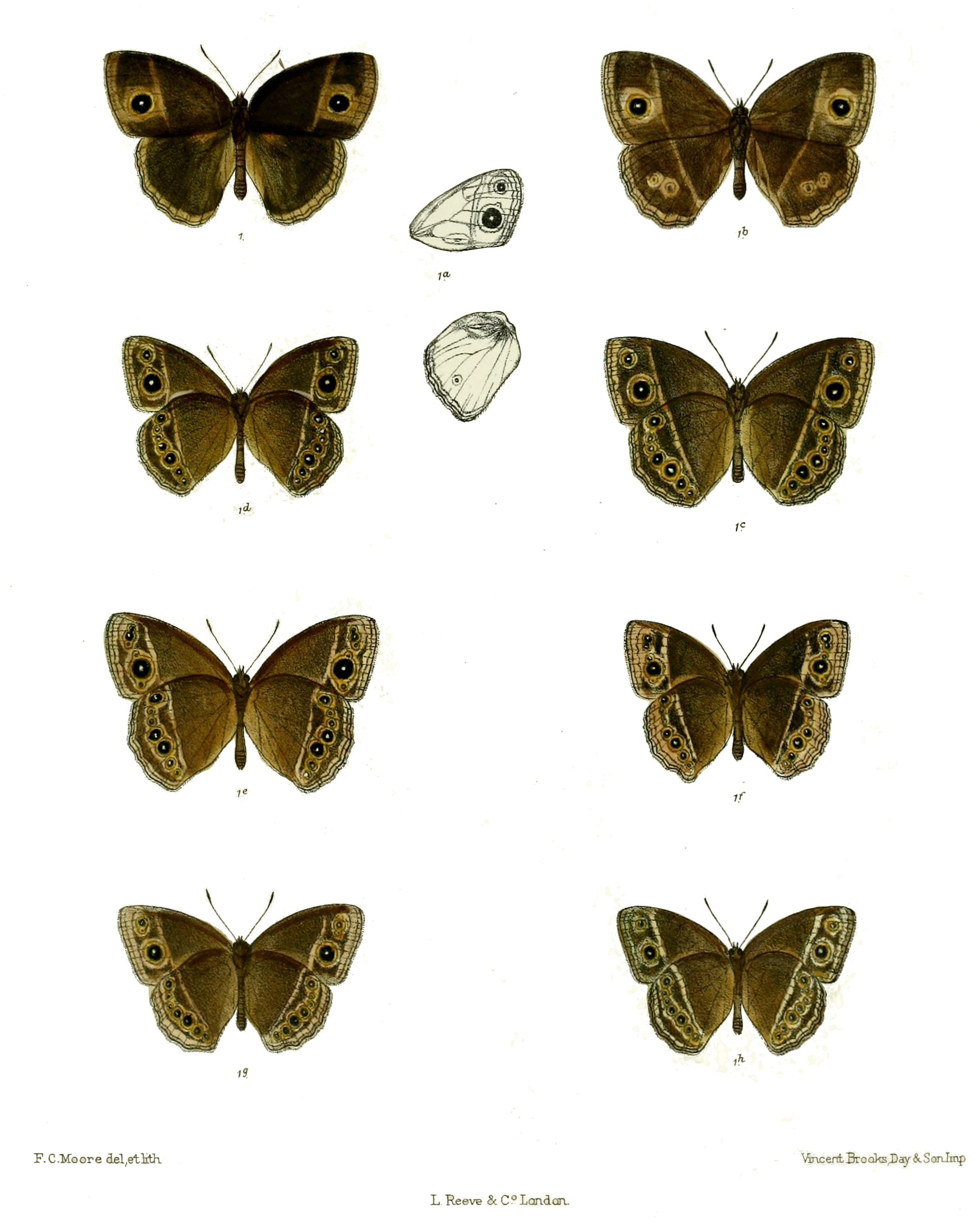
Wet-season form

The colour and wing markings of both seasonal forms of M. visala closely resemble those of M. mineus. On the whole, however, M. visala runs larger, and as a rule both sexes (in the continental form, not in the insular race) can be discriminated from the males and females or allied forms by the shape of the forewing. This is, as a rule, produced and acute at apex, with the termen below sharply transverse. The males, moreover, have the sex-mark on the underside of the forewing rather bright ochraceous and very long, extending beyond the transverse bands crossing the wings.

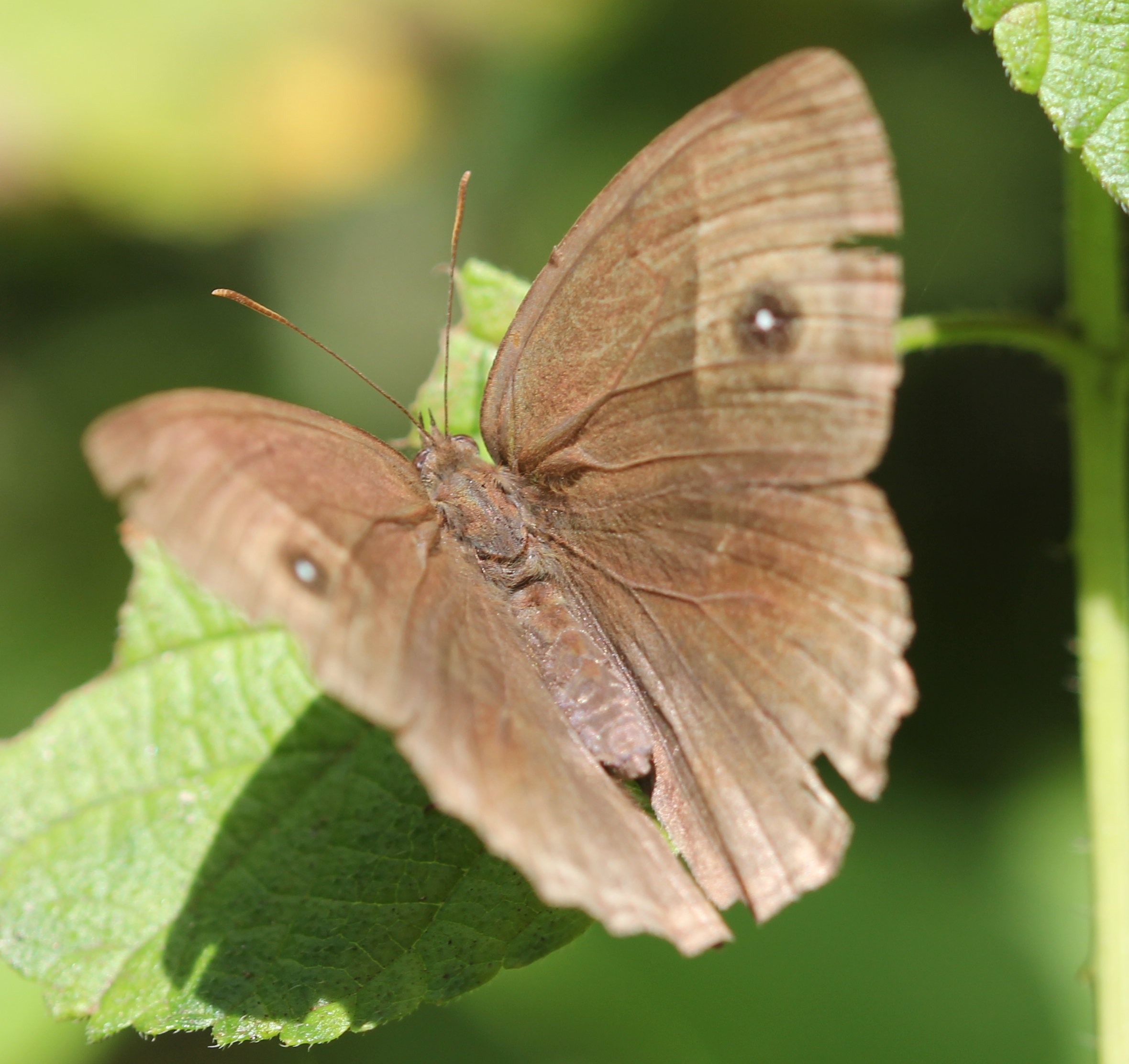
Male

Race andamana, Moore. Male sex-mark on the underside of the forewing as in M. visala. Shape of wings much more rounded in both seasonal forms of both sexes; in this closely resembling M. mineus, but the ground colour of the wings is darker and the ocelli proportionately larger. Disposition of the ocelli apparently quite constant. Upperside: forewing, two ocelli, the posterior the larger; hindwing, none in the male, an obscure one in the female. Underside: both sexes, forewing with two, hindwing with seven ocelli; the posterior four of the latter disposed as in M. mineus.

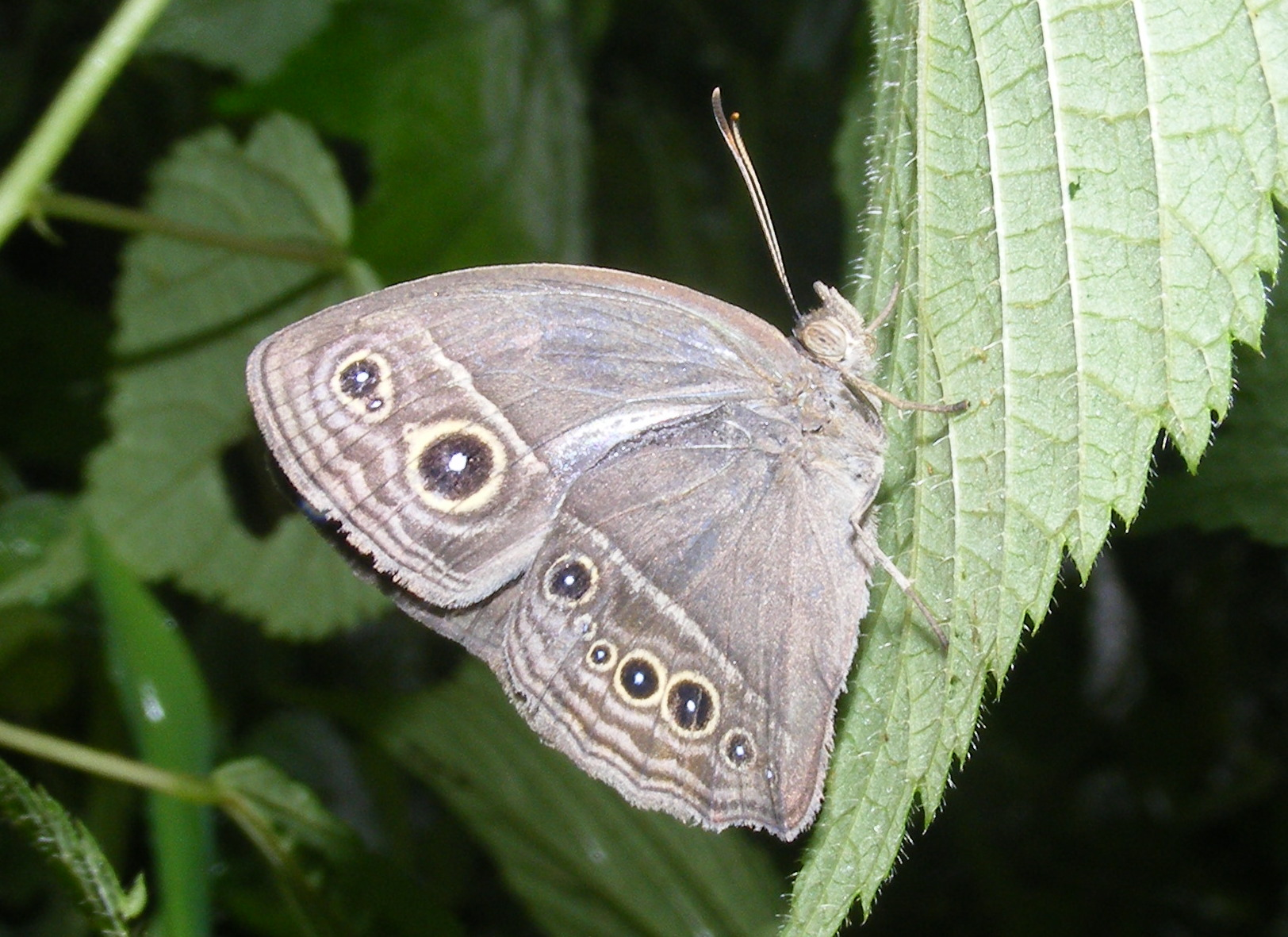

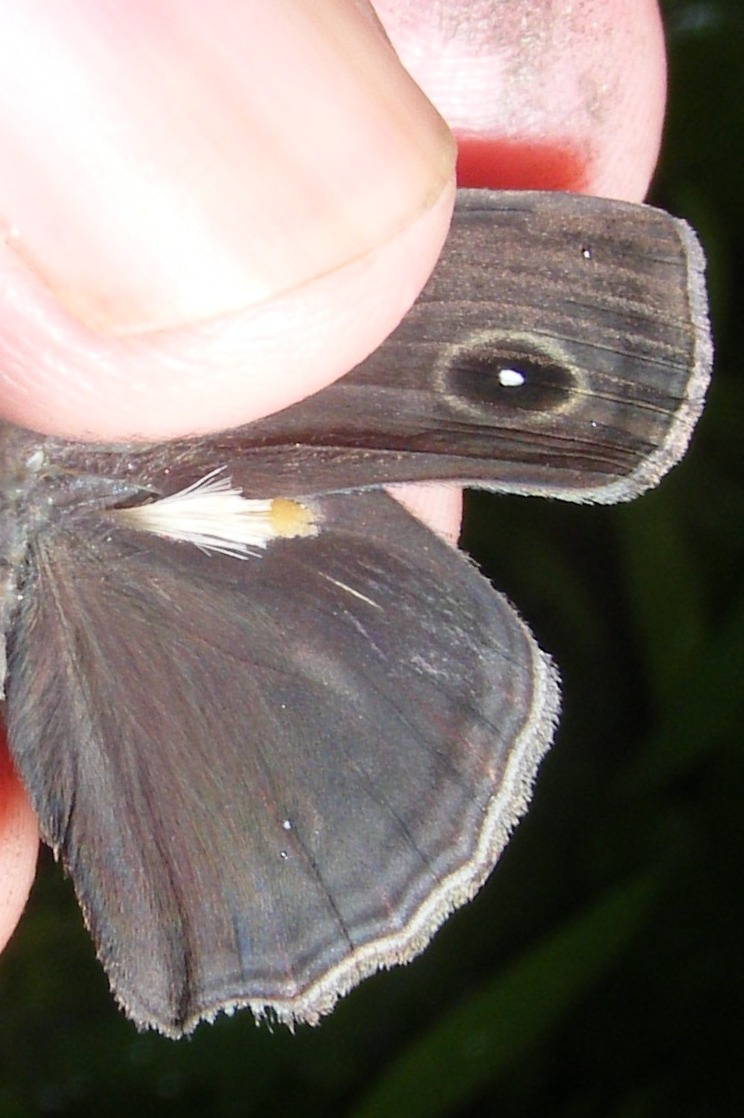

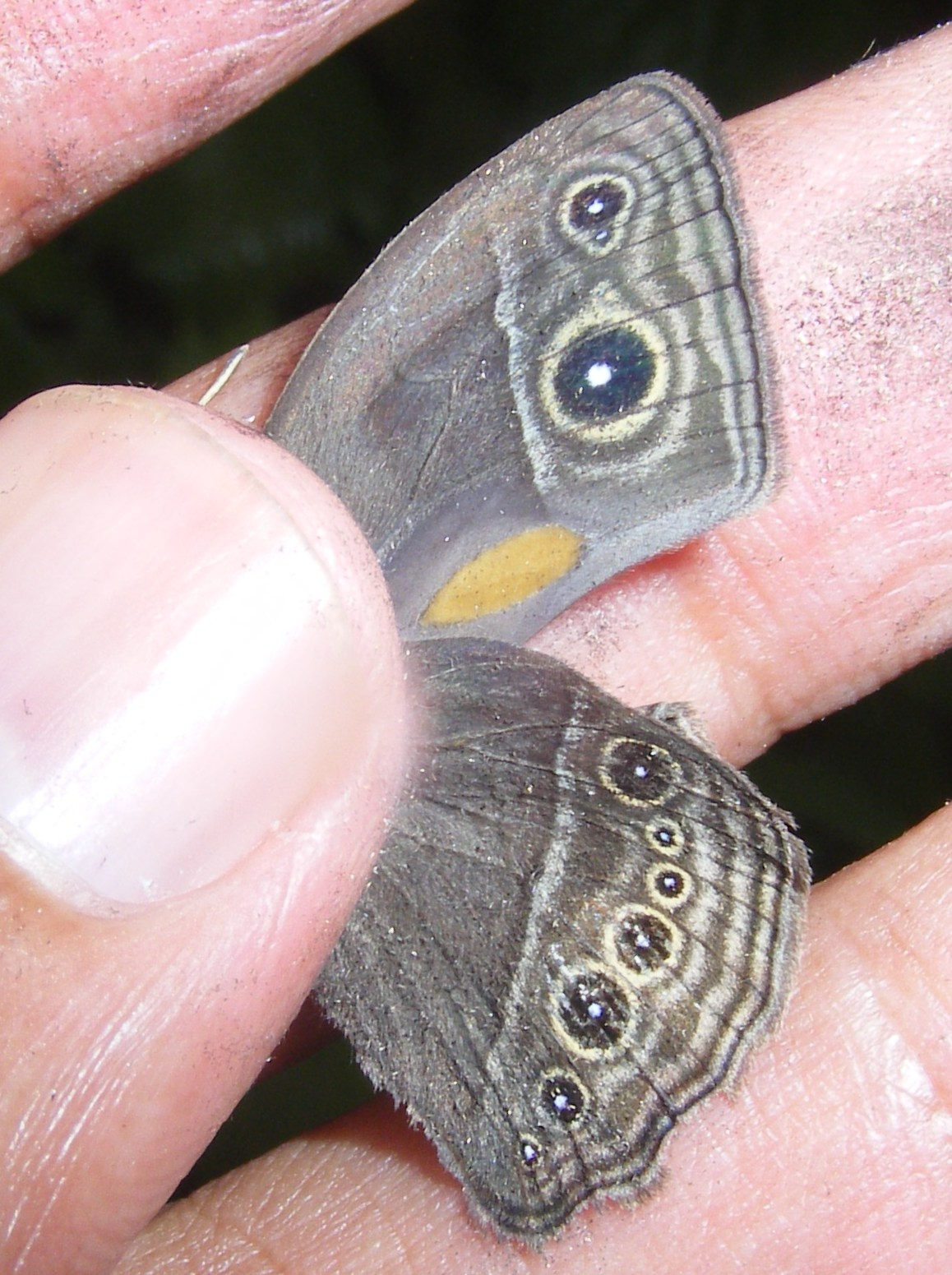
