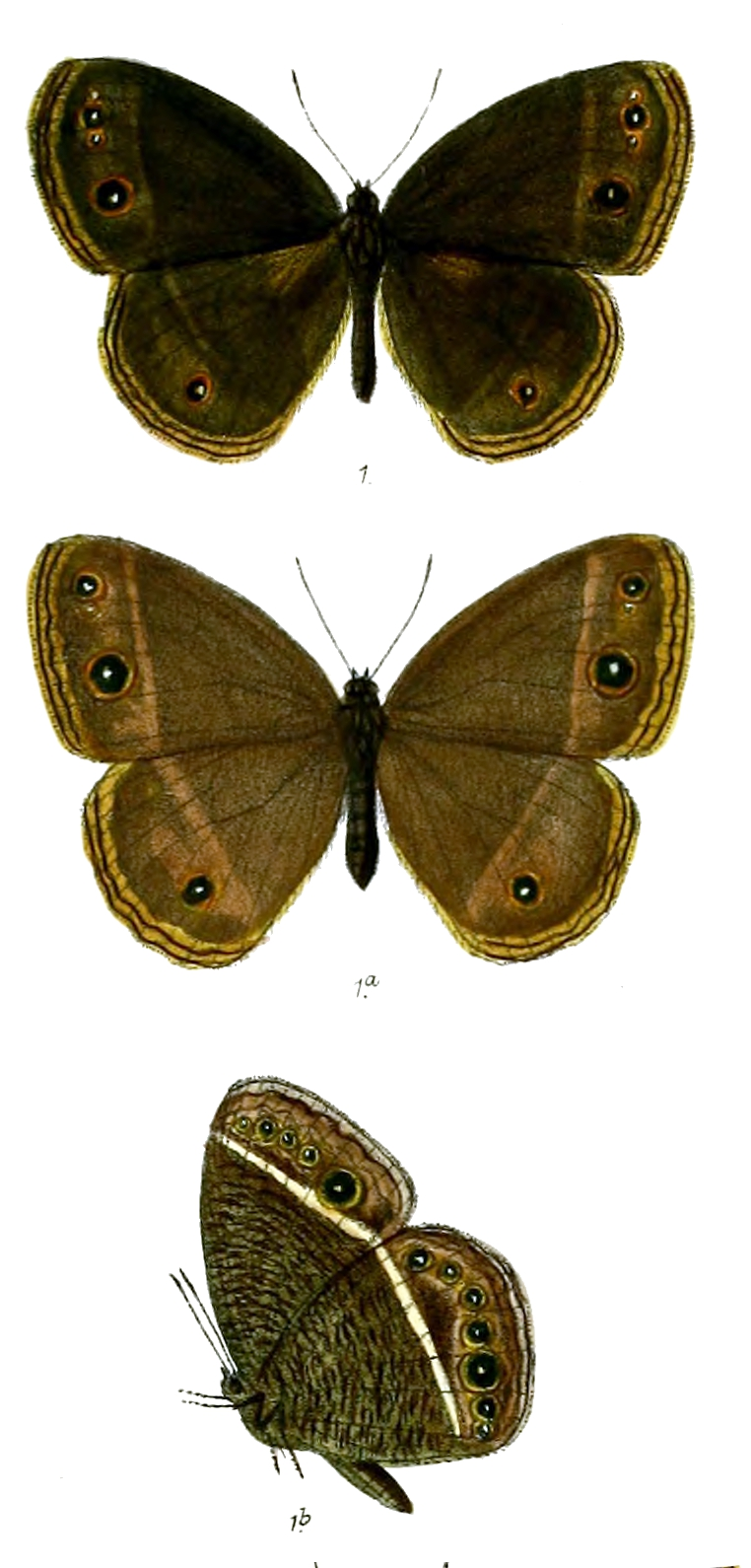

Scientific classification
- Kingdom: Animalia
- Phylum: Arthropoda
- Clade: Pancrustacea
- Class: Insecta
- Order: Lepidoptera
- Family: Nymphalidae
- Genus: Mycalesis
- Species: M. misenus

Binomial name
- Mycalesis misenus de Nicéville, 1901

= Mycalesis misenus =

Salmon-branded bushbrown

Species of butterfly

Mycalesis misenus, the salmon-branded bushbrown, is a species of satyrine butterfly found in Asia. In India, it occurs in Sikkim, Assam, the Khasi Hills. It is also recorded from Vietnam.

== Description ==
This species is very similar to Mycalesis nicotia. It differs only in the conspicuously darker ground colour of the underside, in having the tuft of hairs that overlies the sexual patch of specialized scales on the upperside of the hindwing in the male brown not black, and in the sex-mark on the underside of the forewing being larger and much paler in colour. These differences, slight as they are, seem constant through a series.

Only the wet-season ocellated form of this species has been recorded.
