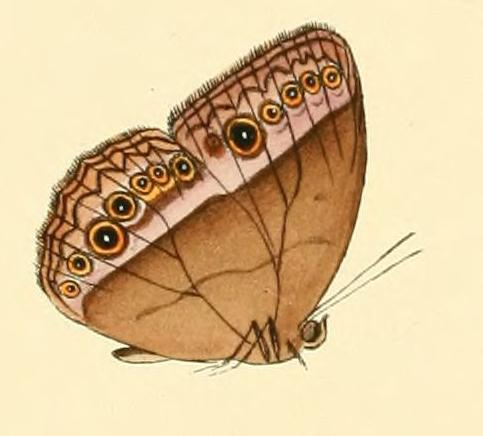

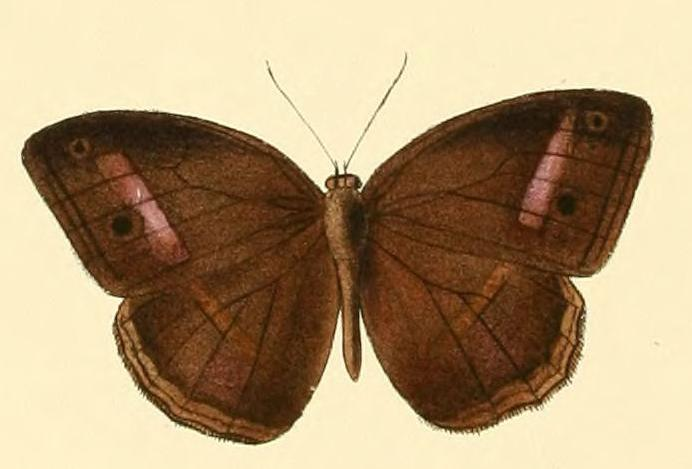

Scientific classification
- Kingdom: Animalia
- Phylum: Arthropoda
- Clade: Pancrustacea
- Class: Insecta
- Order: Lepidoptera
- Family: Nymphalidae
- Genus: Mycalesis
- Species: M. orseis

Binomial name
- Mycalesis orseis Hewitson, 1864

= Mycalesis orseis =

Species of butterfly

Mycalesis orseis, the purple bushbrown, is a butterfly of the family Nymphalidae. It is found in South-east Asia.

== Subspecies ==
- Mycalesis orseis orseis (Sumatra)
- Mycalesis orseis borneensis Fruhstorfer, 1906 (Borneo)
- Mycalesis orseis nautilus Butler, 1867 (Assam to Peninsular Malaya)
- Mycalesis orseis orsina Fruhstorfer, 1906 (Nias)
- Mycalesis orseis flavotincta Staudinger, 1889 (Palawan)
