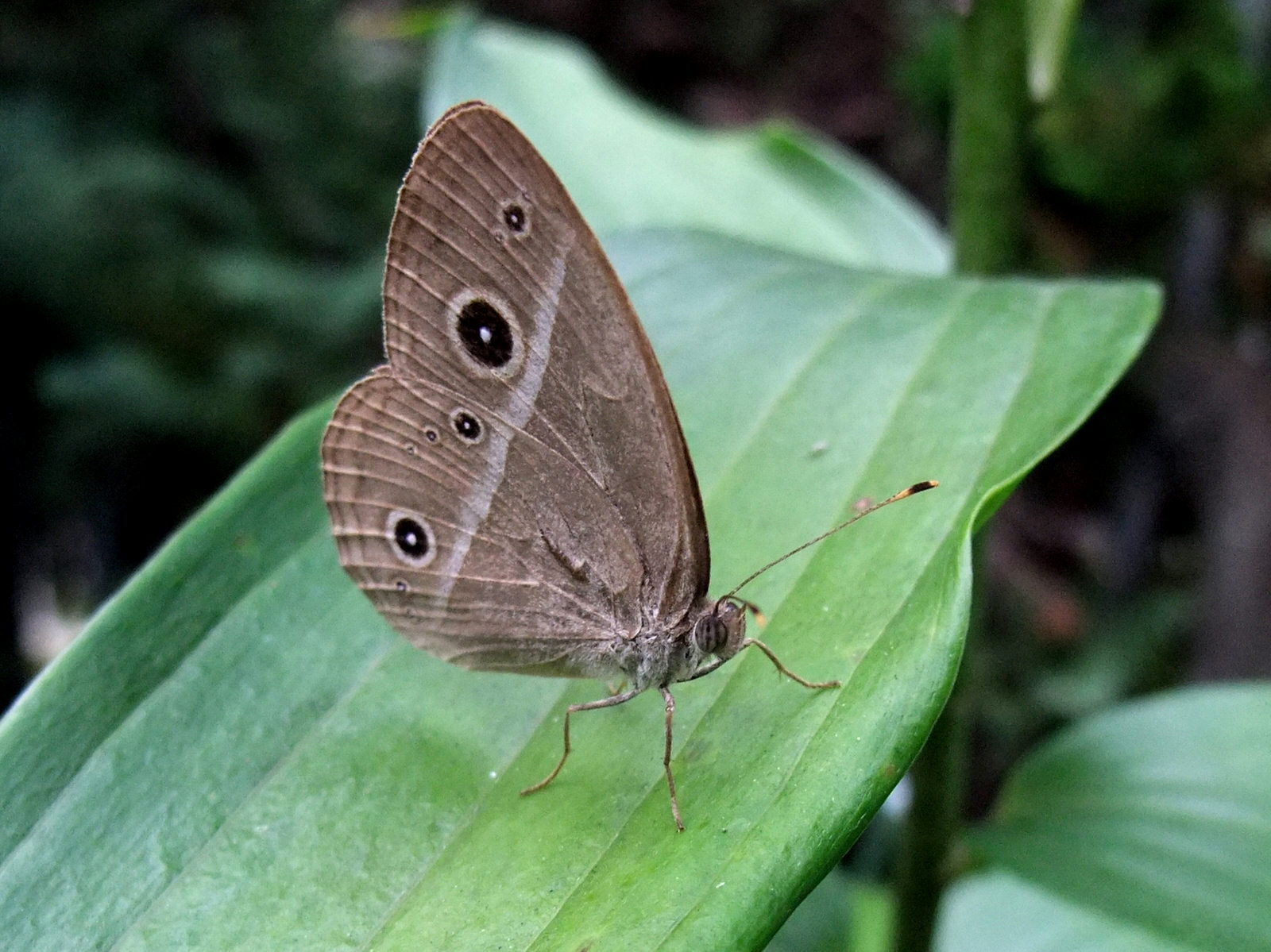

Scientific classification
- Kingdom: Animalia
- Phylum: Arthropoda
- Clade: Pancrustacea
- Class: Insecta
- Order: Lepidoptera
- Family: Nymphalidae
- Genus: Mycalesis
- Species: M. gotama

Binomial name
- Mycalesis gotama Moore, 1857

Synonyms
- Mycalesis borealis C. & R. Felder, [1867]; Mycalesis seriphus Fruhstorfer, 1911; Mycalesis pales Mell, 1942; Mycalesis charaka Moore, [1875]; Sadarga oculata Moore, 1880; Calysisme periboea Butler, 1885

= Mycalesis gotama =

Species of butterfly

Mycalesis gotama, the Chinese bushbrown, is an East Palearctic species of satyrine butterfly found in China, Japan, Assam, Burma, the northeastern Himalayas and northern Vietnam.

The larva feeds on Miscanthus sinensis, Miscanthus floridulus, Setaria palmifolia, Isachne globosa, Oryza sativa and Bambusa species.

Mycalesis gotama in Japan

== Subspecies ==
- M. g. gotama
- M. g. charaka Moore, [1875] (Assam, northern Vietnam, southern China)
- M. g. nanda Fruhstorfer, 1908 (Taiwan)
- M. g. fulginia Fruhstorfer, 1911 (Japan)
