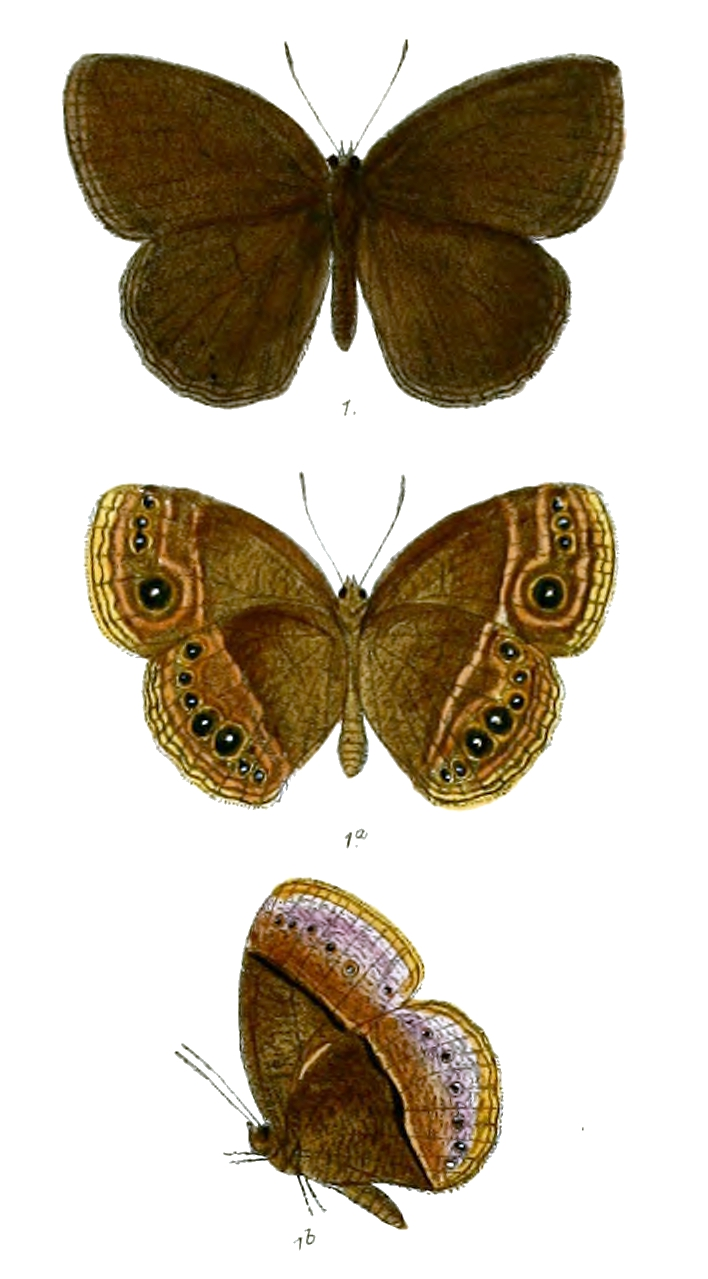

Scientific classification
- Kingdom: Animalia
- Phylum: Arthropoda
- Clade: Pancrustacea
- Class: Insecta
- Order: Lepidoptera
- Family: Nymphalidae
- Genus: Mycalesis
- Species: M. malsarida

Binomial name
- Mycalesis malsarida Butler, 1868

= Mycalesis malsarida =

Plain bushbrown

Species of butterfly

Mycalesis malsarida, the plain bushbrown, is a species of satyrine butterfly found in Asia (Assam (Khasia, Naga Hills) and possibly Vietnam).

== Description ==
Wet-season form. Upperside uniform dark Vandyke brown, slightly paler towards apex of forewing and with somewhat obscure subterminal pale lines. Underside similar, but shading into purplish towards the apex of the forewing and terminal margins of both forewings and hindwings; the wings crossed by a common pale purplish transverse band followed by a series of white-centred, fulvous-ringed black ocelli, five on the forewing and seven on the hindwing, the series bordered on both sides by slender irregular sinuous purple lines, beyond which are subterminal and terminal paler purple lines. Sometimes one or two of the ocelli are absent. Antennae, head, thorax and abdomen brown. Male sex-mark in form 2.

Dry-season form. Upperside similar to that in the wet-season form but paler. Underside move purplish towards terminal margins of the wings; the transverse band narrower, not so well defined; the ocelli more or less obsolete, reduced to mere specks; subterminal and terminal lines ochraceous. The rest as in the wet-season form.
