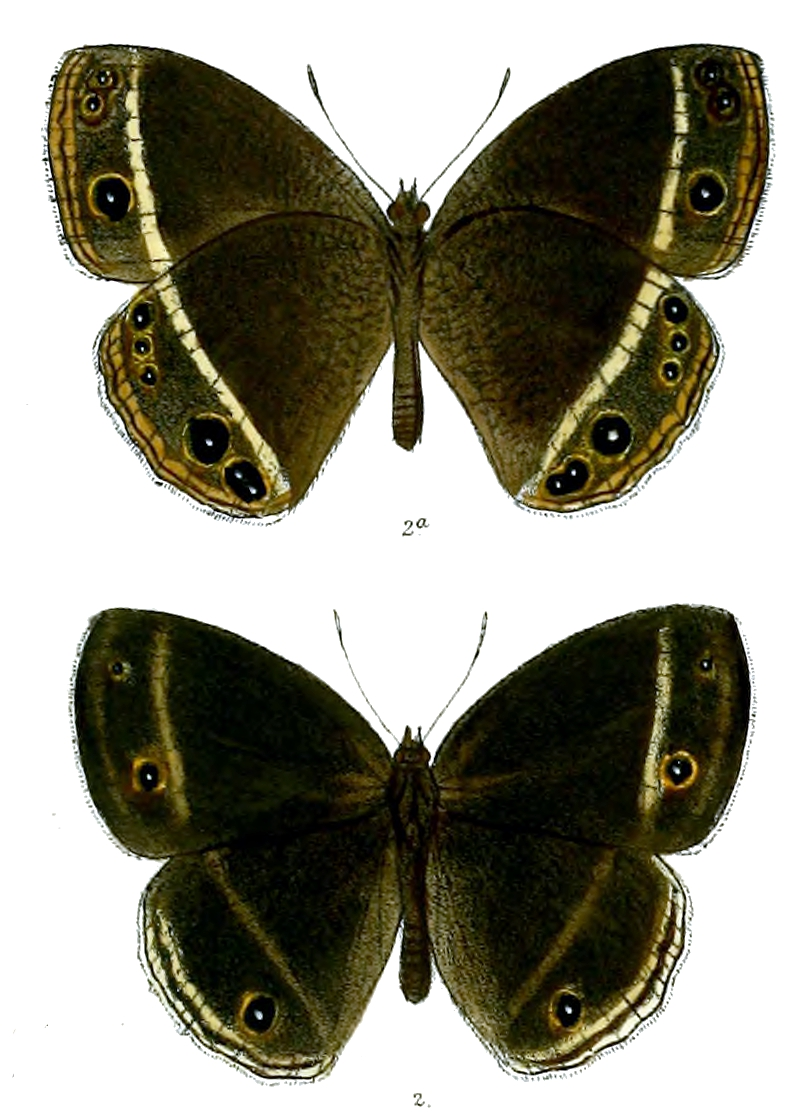

Scientific classification
- Kingdom: Animalia
- Phylum: Arthropoda
- Clade: Pancrustacea
- Class: Insecta
- Order: Lepidoptera
- Family: Nymphalidae
- Genus: Mycalesis
- Species: M. mestra

Binomial name
- Mycalesis mestra Hewitson, 1862

= Mycalesis mestra =

White-edged bushbrown

Species of butterfly

Mycalesis mestra, the white-edged bushbrown, is a species of satyrine butterfly found in Asia (Assam, Burma, Sikkim, Bhutan)

== Description ==
Upperside very dark Vandyke brown, the cilia conspicuously white, the transverse white discal band of the underside showing through on both forewing and hindwing, but very plainly on the latter. Forewing with a white-centred, fulvous-ringed, median, and a similar but much smaller subapical eyespot, the latter very often absent; broad but faint and ill-defined sub-terminal and terminal white lines. Hindwing: a subtornal ocellus (eyespot) similar to those on the forewing and much more conspicuous; subterminal and terminal whitish lines. Underside: ground colour similar; basal half of wings closely irrorated (sprinkled) with pale transverse stripe; a conspicuous white discal band, inwardly sharply defined, outwardly diffused, followed by series of ocelli similar to the ocelli on the upperside, a median and two subapical on the forewing, three subapical and three tornal on the hindwing: the number of these ocelli is variable, sometimes one or more additional ocelli are present, often one or more are lacking on the hindwing; finally, the subterminal and terminal white bands as on the upperside but better defined. Antenna, head, thorax and abdomen brown; antennae annulated (ringed) with white, ochraceous at apex. Male sex-mark in form 2.

Mycalesis suaveolens Wood-Mason & de Nicéville, 1883 resembles M. mestra, but differs constantly as follows: Upperside ground colour a brighter, more ruddy brown; cilia white tinged with ochraceous; the discal, subterminal and terminal bands on the underside showing through much more faintly than in M. mestra; the number of ocelli very variable. Underside: basal area uniform, with no trace of the pale transverse striae; white discal band narrower, subterminal and terminal bands brownish white.
