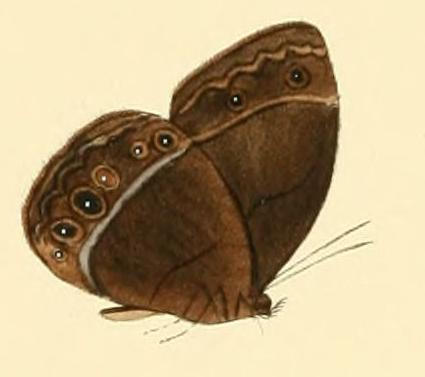

Scientific classification
- Kingdom: Animalia
- Phylum: Arthropoda
- Clade: Pancrustacea
- Class: Insecta
- Order: Lepidoptera
- Family: Nymphalidae
- Genus: Mycalesis
- Species: M. aramis

Binomial name
- Mycalesis aramis Hewitson, 1866

= Mycalesis aramis =

Species of butterfly

Mycalesis aramis is a butterfly of the family Nymphalidae. It is found on Luzon in the Philippines.
