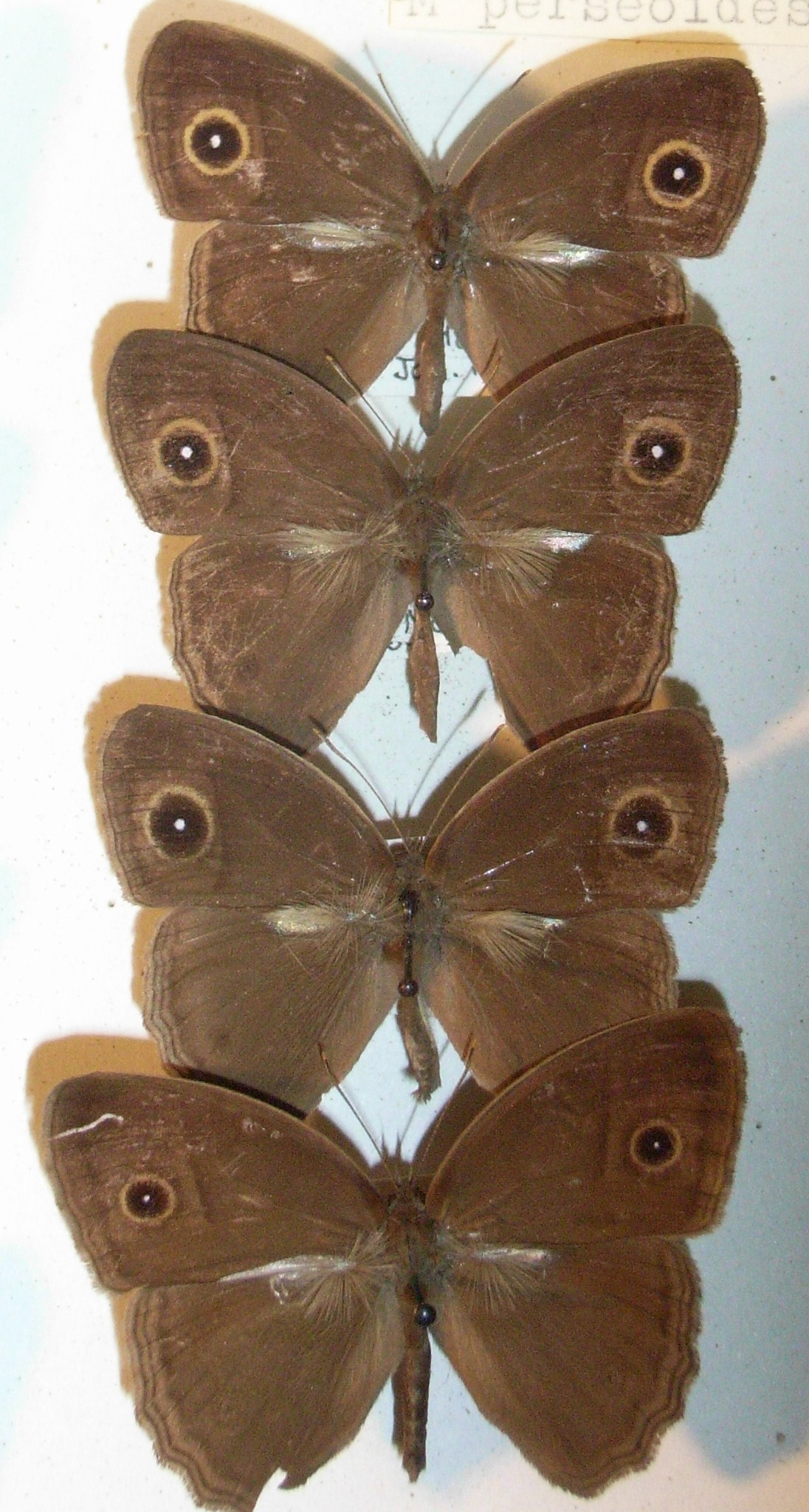
- Museum specimens from Malaya

Scientific classification
- Kingdom: Animalia
- Phylum: Arthropoda
- Clade: Pancrustacea
- Class: Insecta
- Order: Lepidoptera
- Family: Nymphalidae
- Genus: Mycalesis
- Species: M. perseoides

Binomial name
- Mycalesis perseoides (Moore, [1892])

= Mycalesis perseoides =

Species of butterfly

Mycalesis perseoides, the Pachmarhi bushbrown, is a species of satyrine butterfly (family Nymphalidae) found in Asia (Burma, Thailand, Langkawi Island, Peninsular Malaya, Indochina, Yunnan, India)

== Description ==
This form closely resembles M. mineus, in both wet- and dry-season specimens. As in that form, the disposition of the ocelli on the underside of the hindwing separates it from M. perseus. From M. mineus it differs in the male sex-mark on the underside of the forewing, which is longer, broader, and ochraceous brown, not black in colour.

From Kathlekan, in Mysore, there is in the British Museum Collection a series of what I take to be a variety of this form. The specimens (all males) belong to the dry-season form. They are uniformly smaller than typical perseoides, and differ on the upperside of the forewing in the very broad pale iris surrounding the median ocellus, and on the underside of the same wing in the margin of the darker basal portion of the wing being prominently concave just above the dorsal margin. The male sex-mark on the underside of the forewing is larger than that of M. mineus but resembles it in colour. I have been unable to separate even as a variety M. intermedia, Moore, from M. perseoides, Moore.
