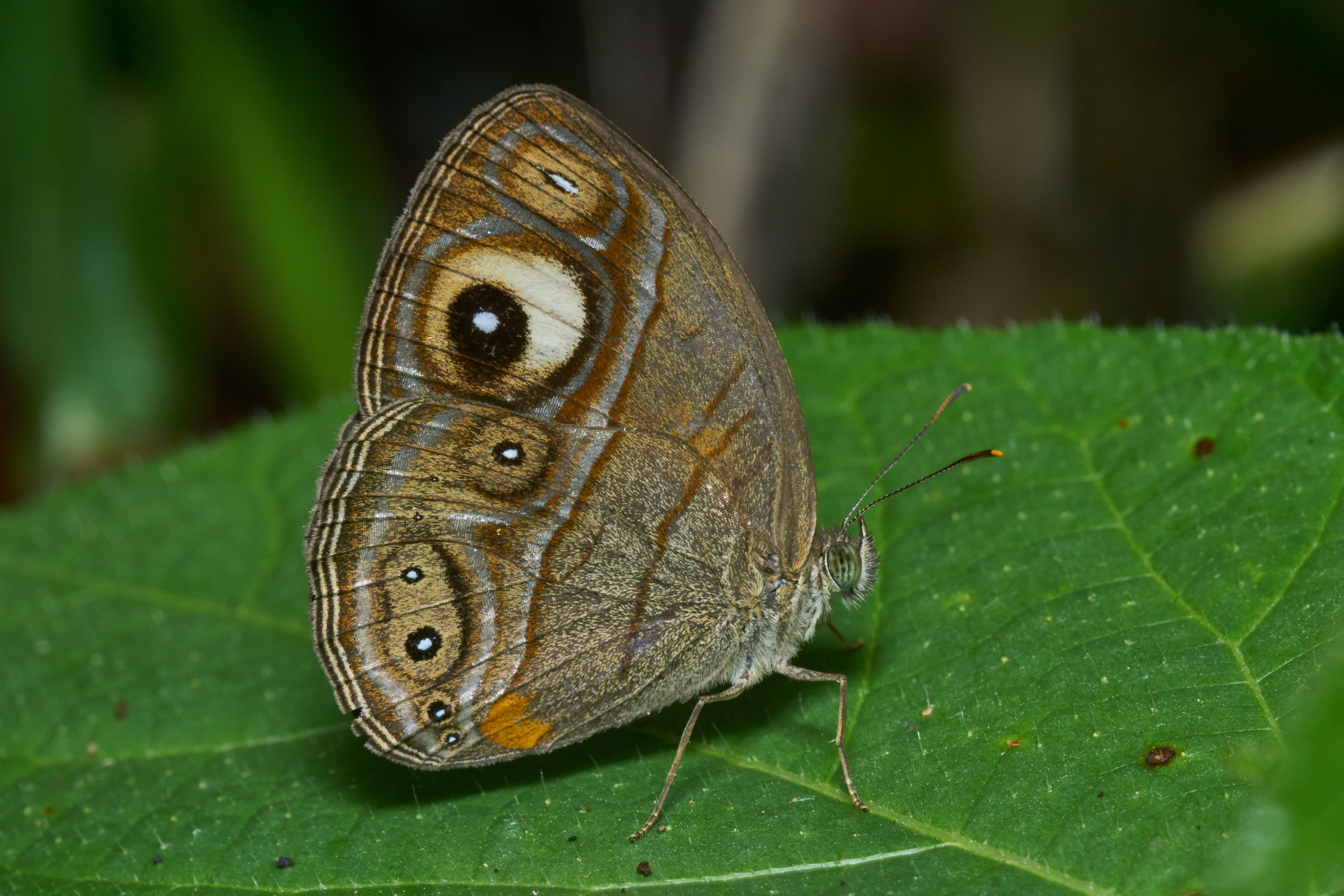

Scientific classification
- Kingdom: Animalia
- Phylum: Arthropoda
- Clade: Pancrustacea
- Class: Insecta
- Order: Lepidoptera
- Family: Nymphalidae
- Genus: Mycalesis
- Species: M. patnia

Binomial name
- Mycalesis patnia (Moore, 1857)

Synonyms
- Mycalesis junonia Butler, 1868

= Mycalesis patnia =

Glad-eye bushbrown

Species of butterfly

Mycalesis patnia, the glad-eye bushbrown, is a satyrid butterfly found in southern India and Sri Lanka.

== Description ==
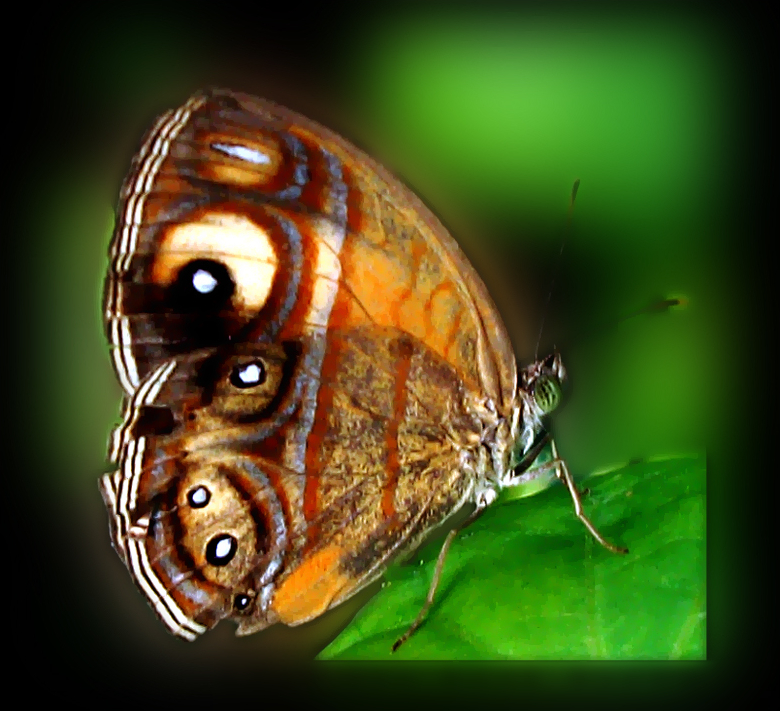
In Nawalakanda, Rathnapura, Sri Lanka

Upperside: The male has a dark umber-brown ground colour slightly suffused with ochraceous. Forewings and hindwings with bright ochraceous-yellow, slender sub-terminal and terminal lines; cilia pale brown. Forewing with a large median and a much smaller subapical white-centred black ocellus, each with an orange-yellow iris, the upper portion of the iris round the median ocellus very broad, the lower incomplete and a more or less triangular orange-yellow discal patch. Hindwing uniform, with two very small fulvous-ringed black ocelli.

Underside of male deep ochraceous yellow, subterminal and terminal line as on the upperside; forewing and hindwing crossed near base by a darker ochraceous-yellow line, followed by a silvery discal band, beyond which there are two ocelli as on the upperside, but each encircled also by an outer silvery ring; and on the hindwing a curved series of seven similar ocelli having a silvery band bordering them on both sides, the third and fourth ocelli from tornus together and the apical ocellus by itself placed on a brighter ochraceous patch encircled with black. Antennae, head, thorax and abdomen brown, somewhat ochraceous beneath. Sex-mark is present in one morph.

The female is similar to the male but more strongly suffused with ochraceous on the upperside; the orange-yellow patch on the forewing larger, spreading to the base of the wing and no ocelli on the hindwing. Underside as in the male, but of a brighter ochraceous yellow; basal area of both forewing and hindwing crossed by two darker yellow bands, and the discoidal cell of the forewing with an interior loop of the same colour.

The southern Indian race M. p. junonia is identical to the nominate race from Sri Lanka but on the upperside is a duller brown; the median ocellus on the forewing encircled with pure white; no discal patch, or merely faint traces of one. Underside: markings similar to those in M. p. patnia, but altogether of a duller and browner shade, without any general ochraceous tint, a large bright ochraceous spot posteriorly on the hindwing in the male. The median ocellus on the forewing broadly encircled with white. Male sex-marks are seen in one morph.

It has a wingspan of 42–54 mm.

Life cycle

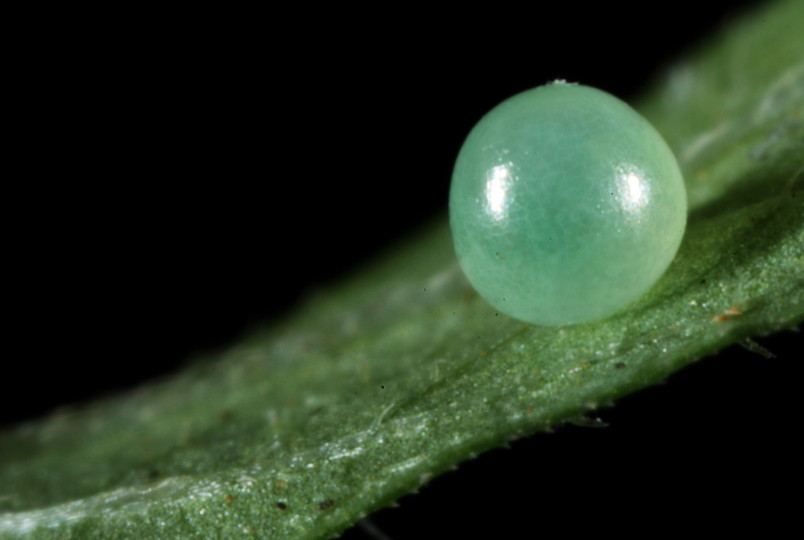
Egg

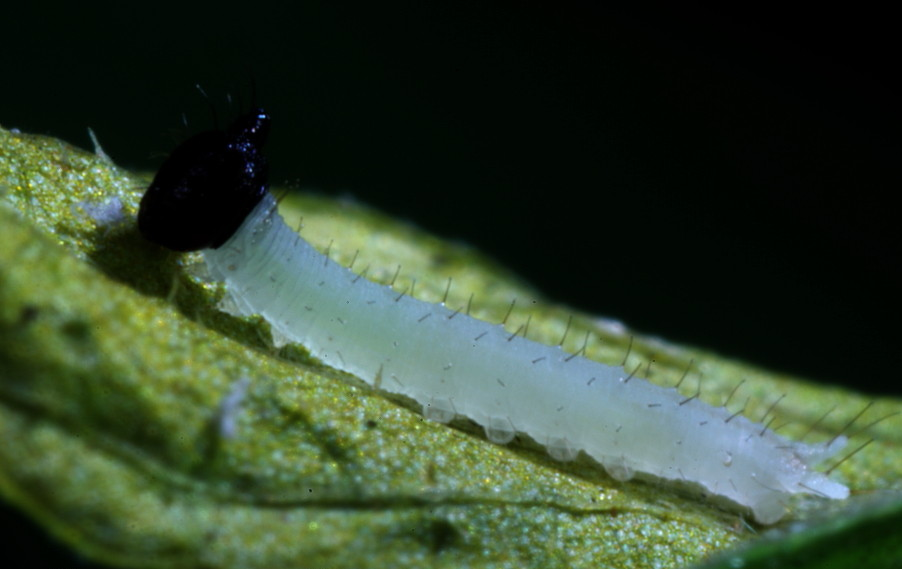
Larva (first instar)

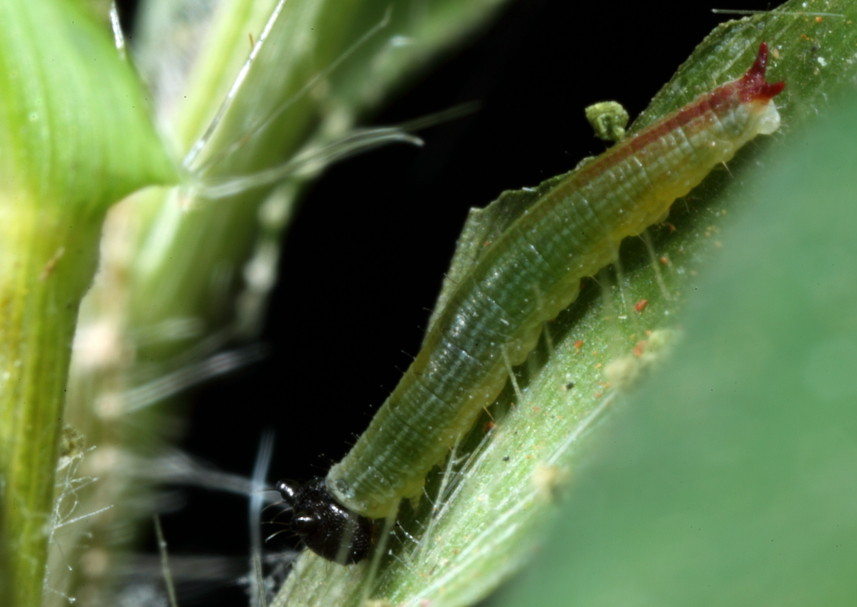
Larva (later instar)

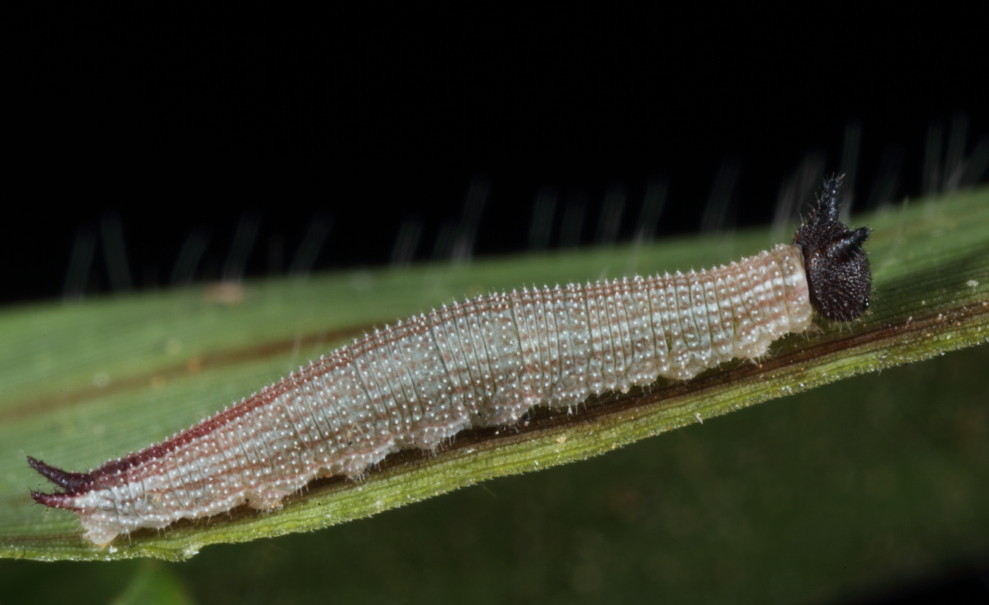
Larva (later instar)

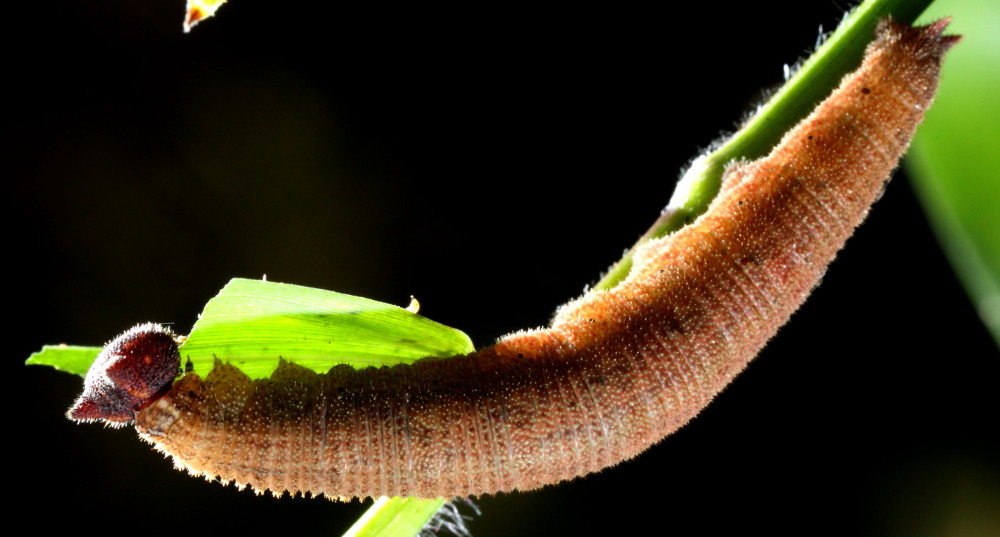
Larva (final instar)

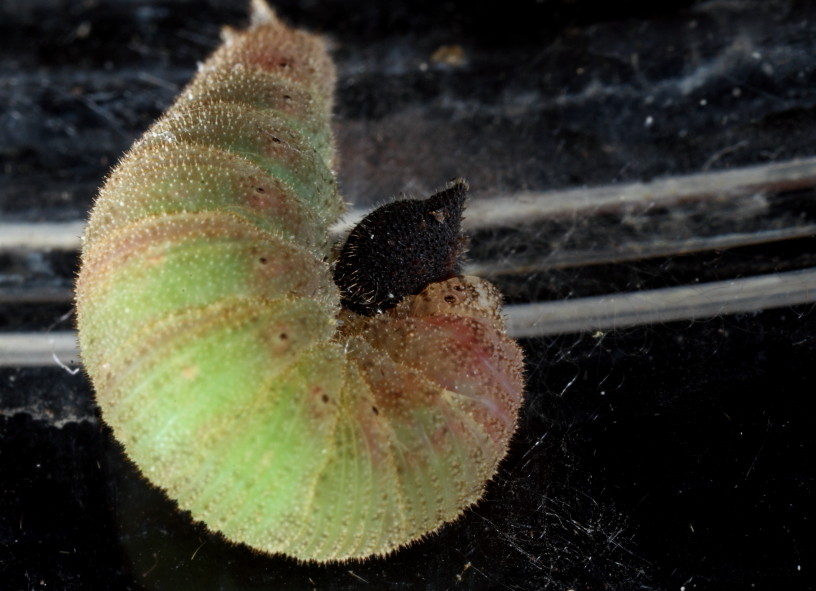
Pupation

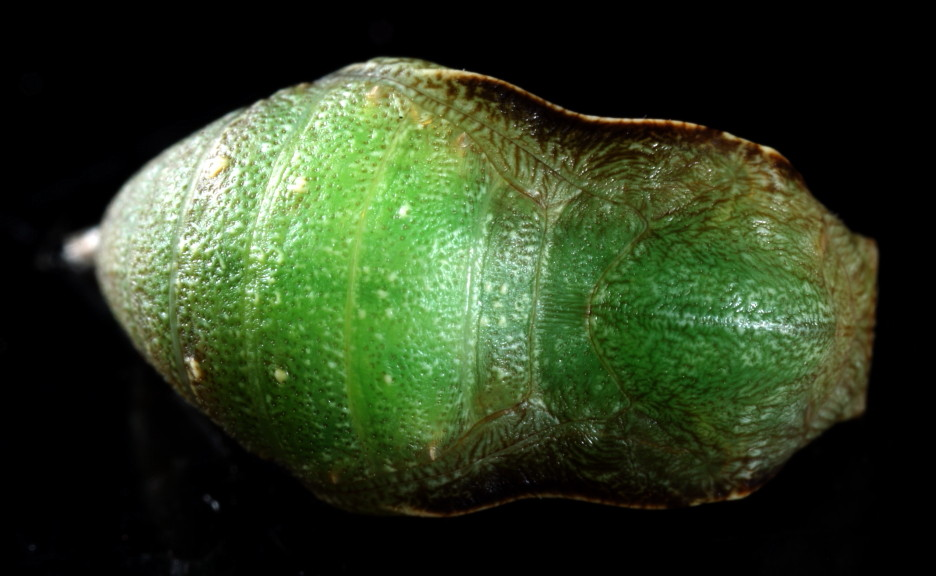
Chrysalis (dorsal view)

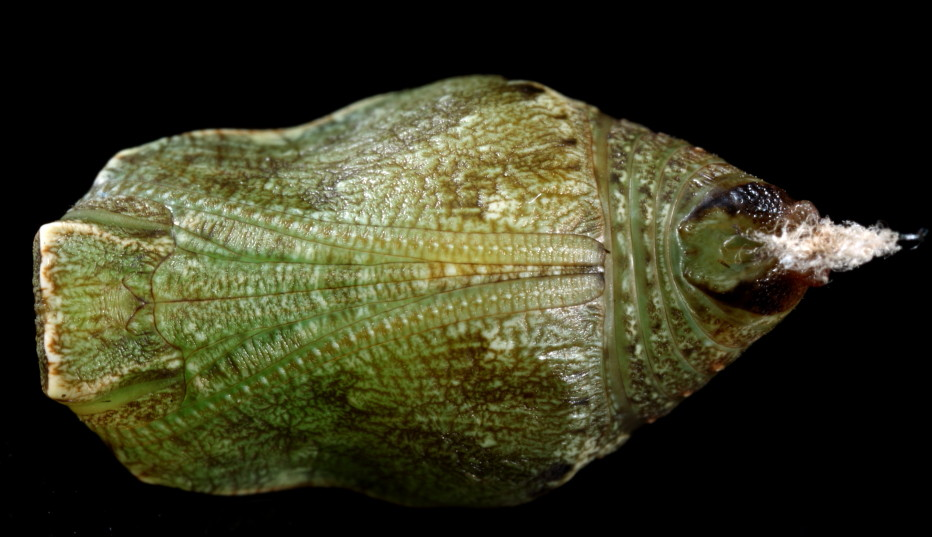
Chrysalis (ventral view)

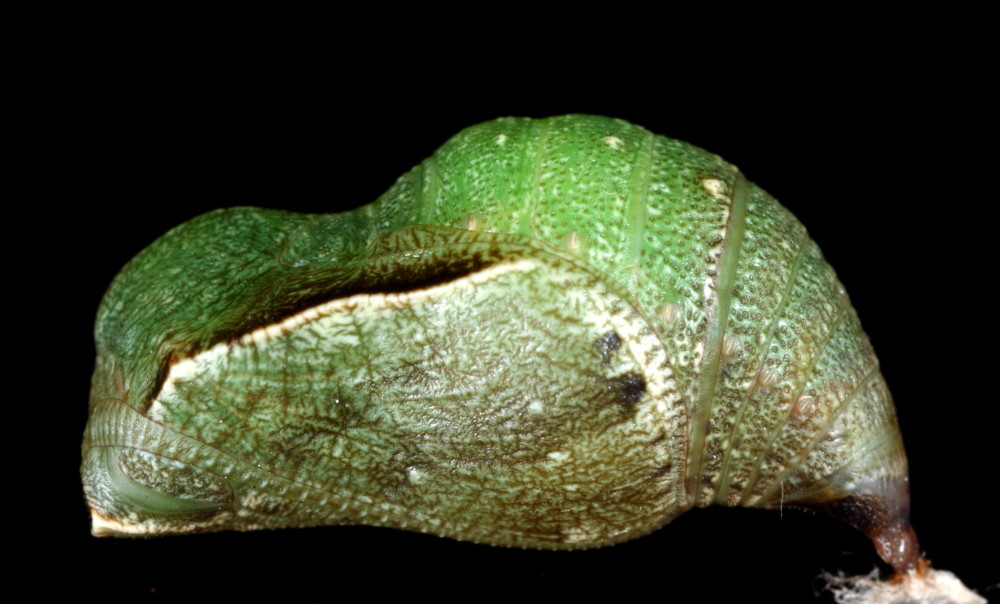
Chrysalis (lateral view)

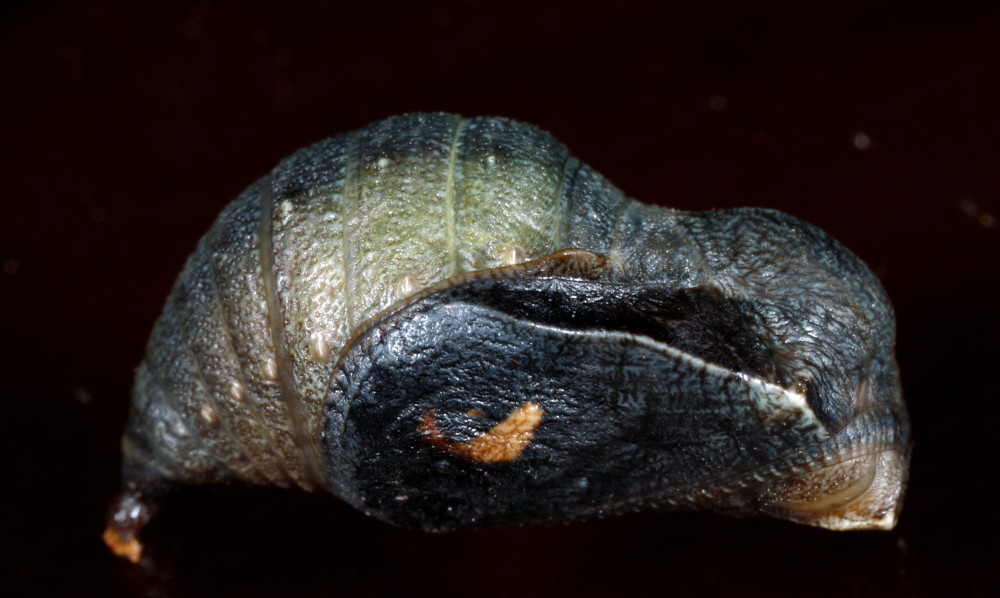
Chrysalis (lateral view)

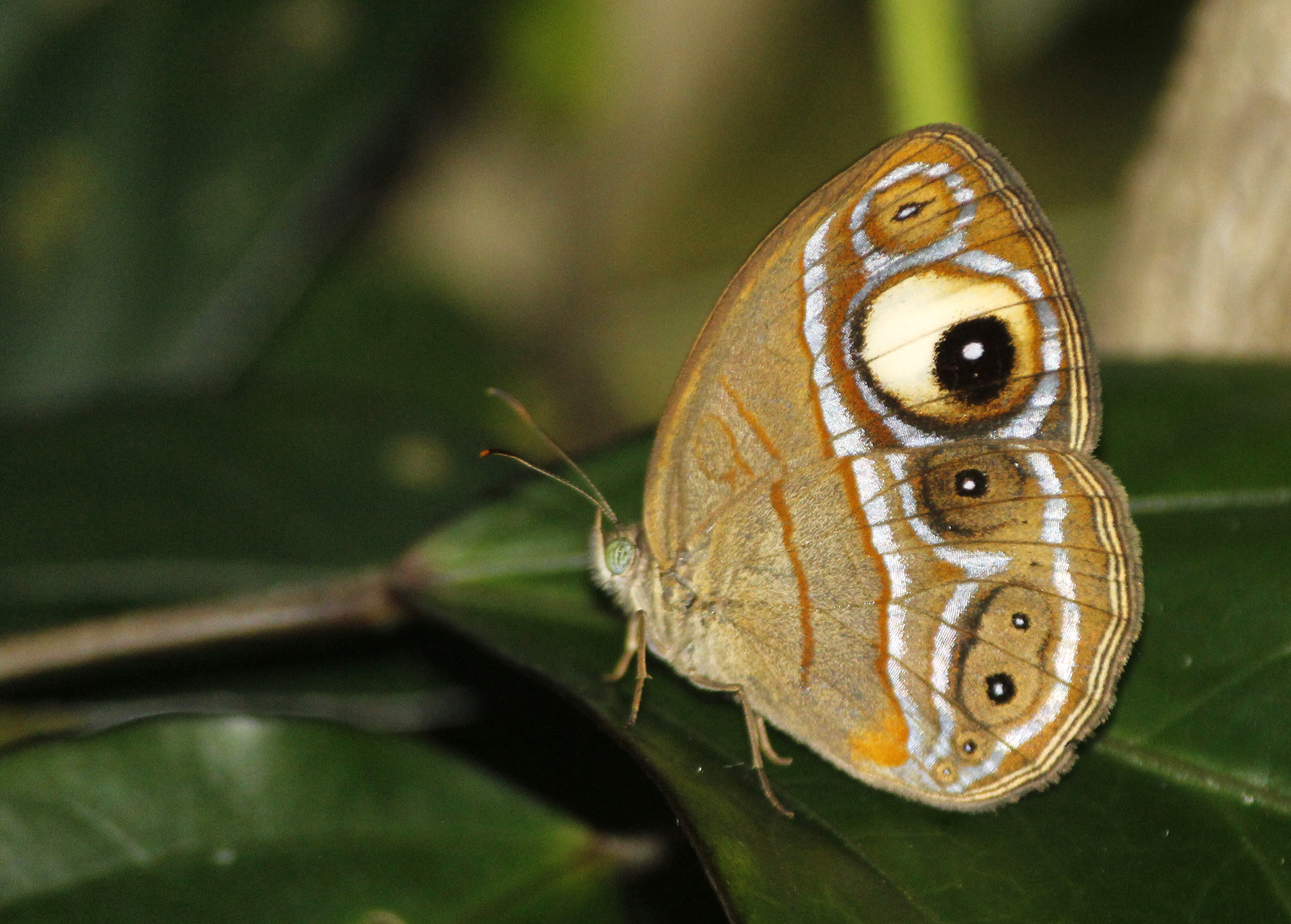
Imago (side view)

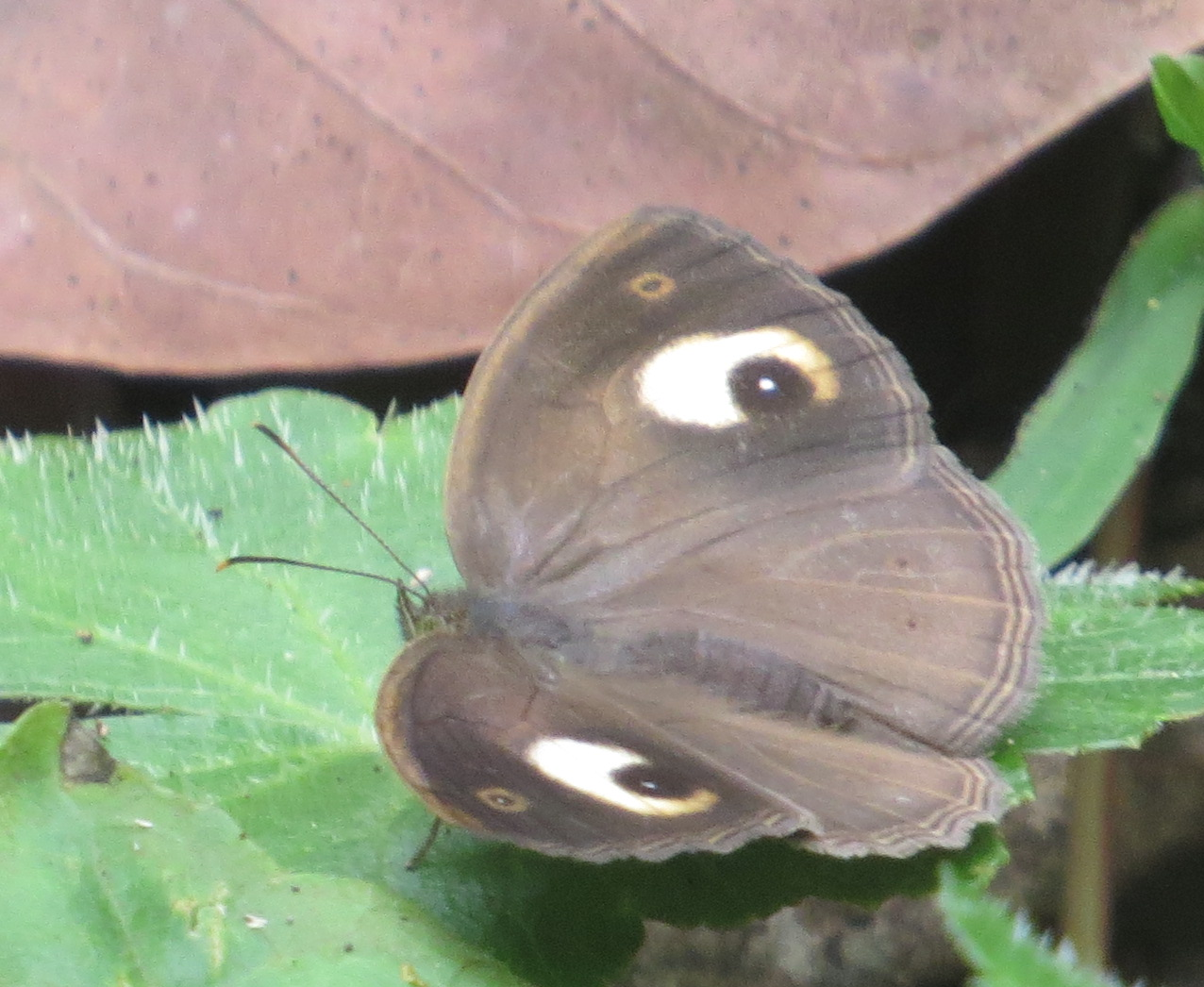
Imago (dorsal view)

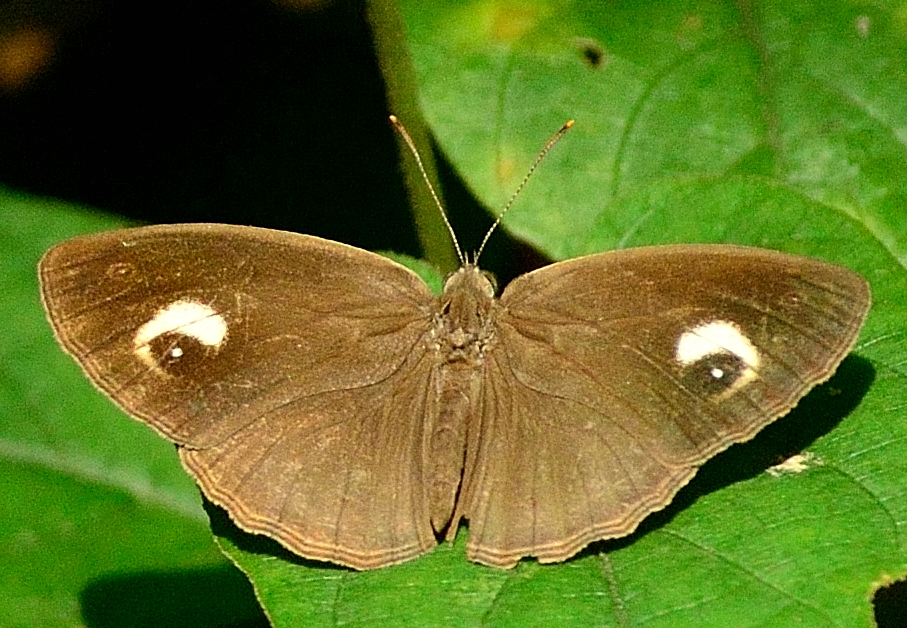
Open wing
