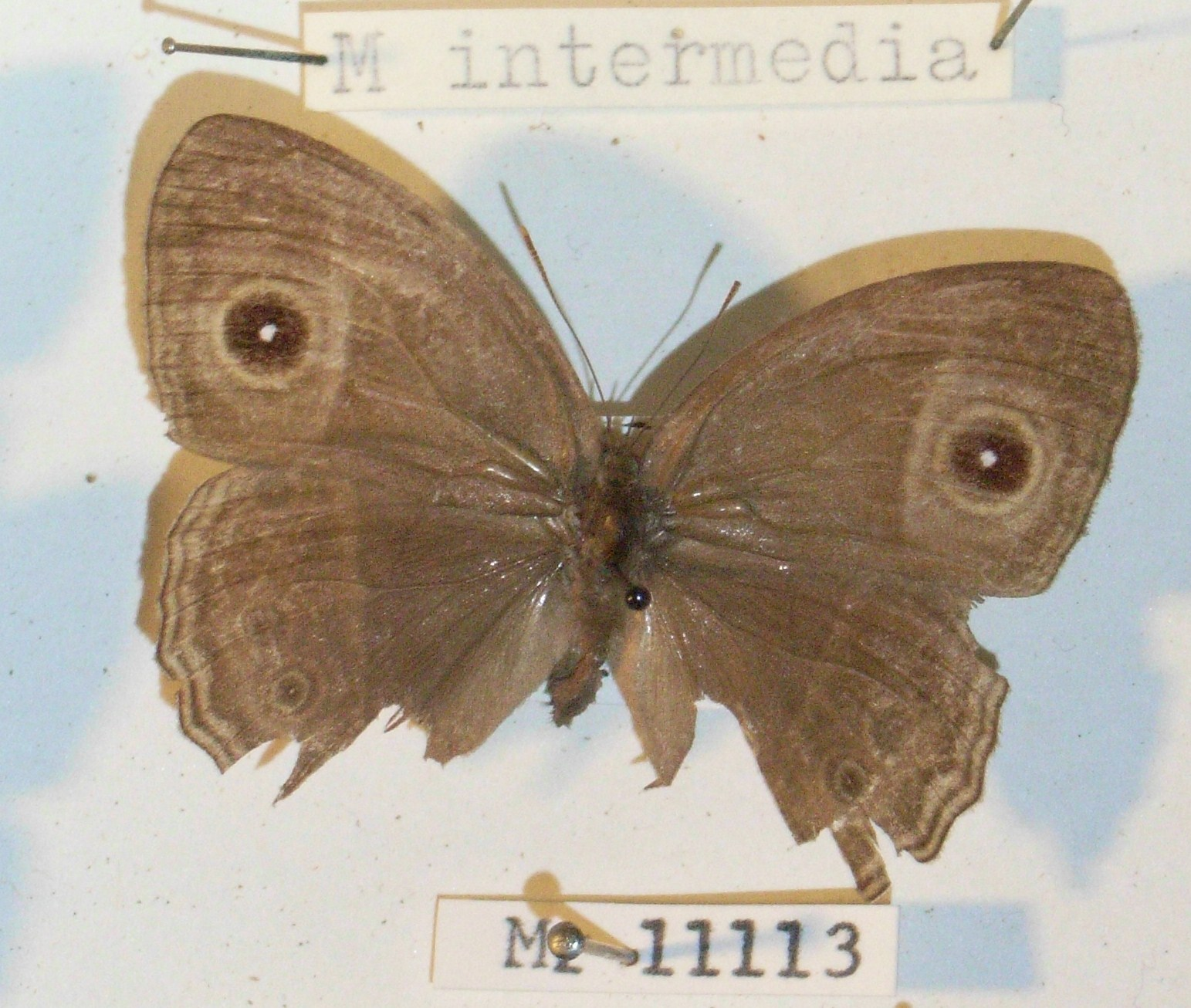
- From Malaya

Scientific classification
- Kingdom: Animalia
- Phylum: Arthropoda
- Clade: Pancrustacea
- Class: Insecta
- Order: Lepidoptera
- Family: Nymphalidae
- Genus: Mycalesis
- Species: M. intermedia

Binomial name
- Mycalesis intermedia Moore, 1892

Synonyms
- Mycalesis khasia Evans, 1920

= Mycalesis intermedia =

Intermediate bushbrown

Species of butterfly

Mycalesis intermedia, the intermediate bushbrown, is a species of satyrine butterfly found in Burma, Cambodia, Thailand, Peninsular Malaysia, Langkawi Island, Indochina, southern Yunnan and India.
