= Mycalesis igilia =

Small long-brand bushbrown

Scientific classification
- Kingdom: Animalia
- Phylum: Arthropoda
- Clade: Pancrustacea
- Class: Insecta
- Order: Lepidoptera
- Family: Nymphalidae
- Genus: Mycalesis
- Species: M. igilia

Binomial name
- Mycalesis igilia (Fruhstorfer, 1911)

Species of butterfly

Mycalesis igilia, the small long-brand bushbrown, is a species of satyrid butterfly found in south India.
