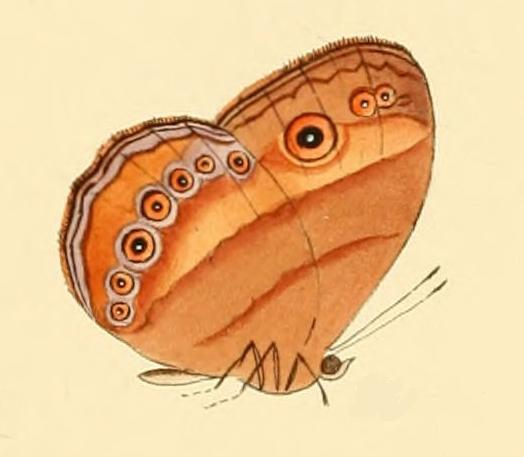

Scientific classification
- Kingdom: Animalia
- Phylum: Arthropoda
- Clade: Pancrustacea
- Class: Insecta
- Order: Lepidoptera
- Family: Nymphalidae
- Genus: Mycalesis
- Species: M. fuscum

Binomial name
- Mycalesis fuscum (C. & R. Felder, 1860)

Synonyms
- Mycalesis fusca; Dasyomma fuscum C. & R. Felder, 1860; Mycalesis diniche Hewitson, 1862; Mycalesis margites Hewitson, 1874; Mycalesis margarites; Mycalesis adustata Fruhstorfer, 1906; Mycalesis musculus Fruhstorfer, 1906

= Mycalesis fuscum =

Malayan bush brown

Species of butterfly

Mycalesis fuscum, the Malayan bush brown, is a butterfly of the family Nymphalidae. It is found on Peninsular Malaysia, Java, Borneo, and Nias.

== Subspecies ==
- Mycalesis fuscum fuscum (Peninsular Malaya)
- Mycalesis fuscum diniche Hewitson, 1862 (Java)
- Mycalesis fuscum adustata Fruhstorfer, 1906 (Borneo)
- Mycalesis fuscum musculus Fruhstorfer, 1906 (Nias)
