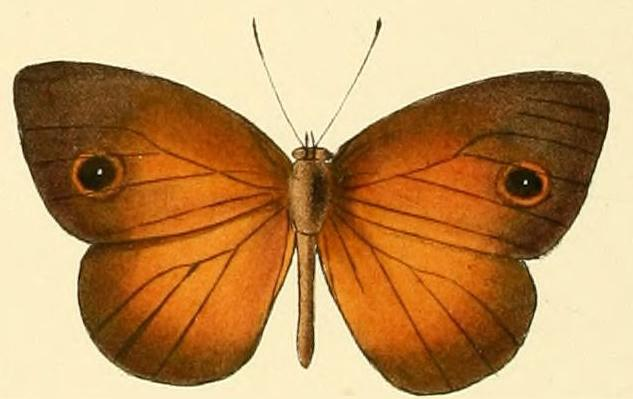

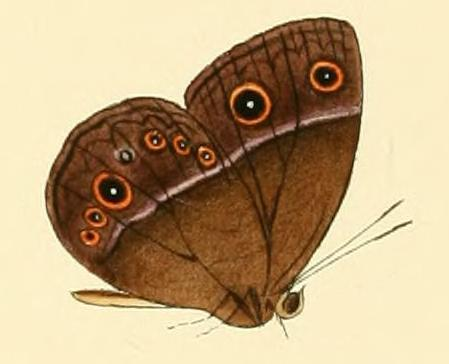

Scientific classification
- Kingdom: Animalia
- Phylum: Arthropoda
- Clade: Pancrustacea
- Class: Insecta
- Order: Lepidoptera
- Family: Nymphalidae
- Genus: Mycalesis
- Species: M. oroatis

Binomial name
- Mycalesis oroatis Hewitson, 1864

Synonyms
- Mycalesis ustulata Distant, 1885; Mycalesis surkha Marshall, 1882; Loesa fervida Butler, 1882

= Mycalesis oroatis =

Species of butterfly

Mycalesis oroatis is a butterfly of the family Nymphalidae. It is found in South-east Asia.

== Subspecies ==
- Mycalesis oroatis oroatis (Java, Bali)
- Mycalesis oroatis ustulata Distant, 1885 (southern Burma, Peninsular Malaya, Sumatra)
- Mycalesis oroatis surkha Marshall, 1882 (Burma, western Thailand)
