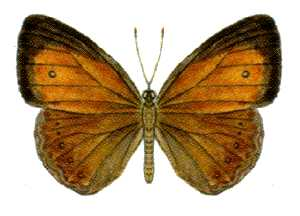

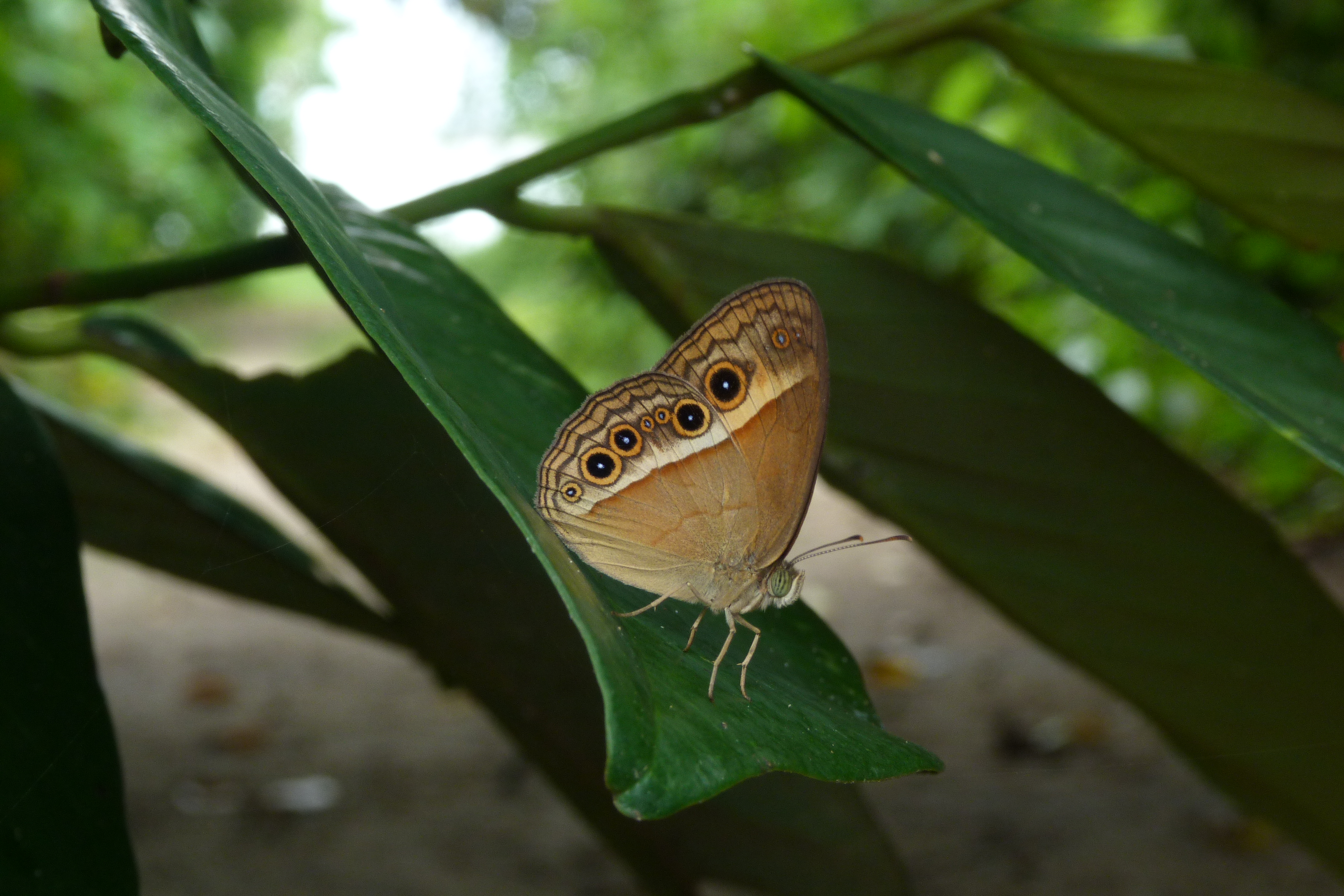

Scientific classification
- Kingdom: Animalia
- Phylum: Arthropoda
- Clade: Pancrustacea
- Class: Insecta
- Order: Lepidoptera
- Family: Nymphalidae
- Genus: Mycalesis
- Species: M. terminus

Binomial name
- Mycalesis terminus (Fabricius, 1775)

Synonyms
- Papilio terminus Fabricius, 1775; Mycalesis tira Gaede, 1931; Papilio remulia Cramer, [1779]; Mycalesis terminus kyllenion Fruhstorfer, 1908; Mycalesis matho Grose-Smith, 1894

= Mycalesis terminus =

Species of butterfly

Mycalesis terminus, the orange bushbrown, is a species of butterfly in the family Nymphalidae. It is found in Indonesia (Irian Jaya, Maluku), New Guinea and Australia (Queensland).

== Subspecies ==
- Mycalesis terminus terminus (Cape York to Yeppoon)
- Mycalesis terminus remulia (Cramer, [1779]) (Ambon, Serang, Obi)
- Mycalesis terminus wakolo Fruhstorfer, 1908 (Buru)
- Mycalesis terminus pseudasophis Fruhstorfer, 1908 (Bachan)
- Mycalesis terminus anteros Fruhstorfer, 1908 (Halmahera)
- Mycalesis terminus ternatensis Fruhstorfer, 1908 (Ternate)
- Mycalesis terminus atropates Fruhstorfer, 1908 (West Irian: Dore Bay)
- Mycalesis terminus terminulus Fruhstorfer, 1908 (Waigeu)
- Mycalesis terminus flagrans Butler, 1876 (Papua New Guinea)
- Mycalesis terminus matho Grose-Smith, 1894 (Bismarck Archipelago)
