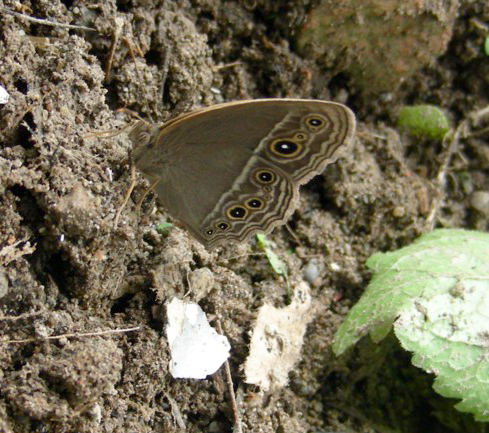
- Whiteline bushbrown (Mycalesis malsara) wet-season form

Scientific classification
- Kingdom: Animalia
- Phylum: Arthropoda
- Class: Insecta
- Order: Lepidoptera
- Family: Nymphalidae
- Subfamily: Satyrinae
- Tribe: Elymniini
- Genus: Mycalesis; Hübner, 1818

Species
- Numerous, see text

= Mycalesis =

Genus of brush-footed butterflies

Mycalesis, the bushbrowns, are a genus of brush-footed butterflies. They are common in the warm regions from Central Asia to Australia, and have a high diversity in South Asia and the Wallacea.

They are notably polymorphic, with wet- and dry-season forms differing in many species, especially as regards size and number of underwing eyespots.

Mycalesis superficially resemble the species Orsotriaena medus, but can readily be identified by the number of spots.

== Species ==
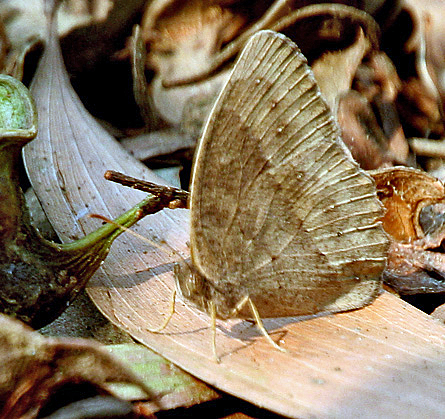
Dingy bushbrown (Mycalesis perseus), dry-season form

Listed alphabetically:

- Mycalesis adamsoni Watson, 1897 – Watson's bushbrown
- Mycalesis adolphei (Guérin-Ménéville, 1843) – redeye bushbrown
- Mycalesis aethiops Butler, 1868
- Mycalesis amoena Druce, 1873
- Mycalesis anaxioides Marshall & de Nicéville, 1883
- Mycalesis annamitica Fruhstorfer, 1906 – Annam bushbrown, tawny bush-brown
- Mycalesis anapita Moore, [1858]
- Mycalesis anaxias Hewitson, 1862 – white-bar bushbrown
- Mycalesis arabella Fruhstorfer, 1906
- Mycalesis aramis Hewitson, 1866
- Mycalesis asophis Hewitson, 1862
- Mycalesis atrata Röber, 1887
- Mycalesis barbara Grose-Smith, 1894
- Mycalesis bazochii (Guérin-Méneville, 1831)
- Mycalesis biformis Rothschild, 1916
- Mycalesis bilineata Fruhstorfer, 1906
- Mycalesis bisaya C. & R. Felder, 1863
- Mycalesis cacodaemon Kirsch, 1877
- Mycalesis comes Grose-Smith, 1894
- Mycalesis deficiens Fruhstorfer, 1906
- Mycalesis discobolus Fruhstorfer, 1906
- Mycalesis dohertyi Elwes, 1891
- Mycalesis drusillodes (Oberthür, 1894)
- Mycalesis duponcheli (Guérin-Méneville, 1830)
- Mycalesis durga Grose-Smith & Kirby, 1896
- Mycalesis elia Grose-Smith, 1894
- Mycalesis evansii Tytler, 1914 – Tytler's bushbrown
- Mycalesis evara Fruhstorfer, 1906
- Mycalesis felderi Butler, 1868
- Mycalesis francisca (Stoll, [1780]) – lilacine bushbrown
  - Mycalesis francisca formosana Fruhstorfer, 1908
- Mycalesis fuscum (C. & R. Felder, 1860) – Malayan bush-brown
- Mycalesis giamana Parsons, 1986
- Mycalesis gotama Moore, 1857 – Chinese bushbrown
  - Mycalesis gotama nanda Fruhstorfer, 1908
- Mycalesis heri Moore, 1857 – Moore's bushbrown
- Mycalesis horsfieldi (Moore, [1892])Malaysia, Java, Celebes. See [maps] – Horsfield's bush brown
- Mycalesis igilia Fruhstorfer, 1911 – small long-brand bushbrown
- Mycalesis igoleta C. & R. Felder, 1863
- Mycalesis inayoshii Aoki & Yamaguchi, 1995
- Mycalesis inopia Fruhstorfer, 1908
- Mycalesis intermedia (Moore, [1892]) – intermediate bushbrown
- Mycalesis ita C. & R. Felder, 1863
- Mycalesis itys C. & R. Felder, [1867] – Itys bush brown
- Mycalesis janardana Moore, 1857 – Common Bush Brown, Janardana Bush Brown, Mottled Bush-Brown
- Mycalesis khasia Evans, 1920 – palebrand bushbrown
- Mycalesis lepcha (Moore, 1880) – Lepcha bushbrown
- Mycalesis madjicosa Butler, 1868
- Mycalesis maianeas Hewitson, 1864
- Mycalesis malsarida Butler, 1868 – plain bushbrown
- Mycalesis mamerta (Stoll, [1780]) – blind-eye bushbrown
  - Mycalesis mamerata davisoni – Palni bushbrown
- Mycalesis manii Doherty, 1886
- Mycalesis maura Grose-Smith, 1894
- Mycalesis mnasicles Hewitson, 1864
- Mycalesis meeki Rothschild, 1915
- Mycalesis mehadeva (Boisduval, 1832)
- Mycalesis mercea Evans (nomen nudum?) – Pachmarhi bushbrown
- Mycalesis messene Hewitson, 1862
- Mycalesis mestra Hewitson, 1862 – white-edged bushbrown
- Mycalesis mineus (Linnaeus, 1758) – dark-branded bushbrown
- Mycalesis misenus de Nicéville, 1889 – salmon-branded bushbrown
- Mycalesis mnasicles Hewitson, 1864
- Mycalesis moorei C. & R. Felder, [1867]
- Mycalesis mucia Hewitson, 1862
- Mycalesis mulleri Tennent, 2000
- Mycalesis mynois Hewitson, 1864
- Mycalesis mystes de Nicéville, 1891 - many-tufted bushbrown
- Mycalesis nala C. & R. Felder, 1859
- Mycalesis nerida Grose-Smith, 1902
- Mycalesis nicotia Westwood, [1850] – bright-eye bushbrown
- Mycalesis oculus Marshall, 1880 – red-disc bushbrown
- Mycalesis oroatis Hewitson, 1864
- Mycalesis orseis Hewitson, 1864 – purple bushbrown
- Mycalesis panthaka Fruhstorfer, 1909
- Mycalesis patiana Eliot, 1969
- Mycalesis pitana Staudinger, [1897]
- Mycalesis patnia Moore, 1857 – glad-eye bushbrown
- Mycalesis perseoides (Moore, [1892]) – Pachmarhi bushbrown
- Mycalesis perseus (Fabricius, 1775) – dingy bushbrown or common bushbrown
  - Mycalesis perseus blasius (Fabricius, 1798)
- Mycalesis pitana Staudinger, [1897]
- Mycalesis phidon Hewitson, 1862
- Mycalesis radza Moore, 1878
- Mycalesis rama (Moore, 1892) – Cingalese bushbrown
- Mycalesis sangaica Butler, 1877 – single ring bushbrown
  - Mycalesis sangaica mara Fruhstorfer, 1908
- Mycalesis shiva (Boisduval, 1832)
- Mycalesis siamica Riley & Godfrey, 1921
- Mycalesis sirius (Fabricius, 1775)
- Mycalesis splendens Mathew, 1887
- Mycalesis suaveolens Wood-Mason & de Nicéville, 1883 – Wood-Mason's bushbrown
  - Mycalesis suaveolens kagina Fruhstorfer, 1908
- Mycalesis subpersa Rothschild, 1915
- Mycalesis sudra C. & R. Felder, [1867]
- Mycalesis tagala C. & R. Felder, 1863
- Mycalesis terminus (Fabricius, 1775) – orange bushbrown
- Mycalesis thailandica Aoki & Yamaguchi, 1984
- Mycalesis thyateira (Fruhstorfer, 1911)
- Mycalesis treadawayi Schröder, 1976
- Mycalesis unica Leech, [1892]
- Mycalesis valeria Grose-Smith, 1900
- Mycalesis valeriana Grose-Smith, 1900
- Mycalesis visala Moore, [1858] – long-brand bushbrown
  - Mycalesis visala subdita – Tamil bushbrown
- Mycalesis wayewa Doherty, 1891
- Mycalesis zonata Matsumura, 1909 – South China bushbrown

== See also ==
- Orsotriaena
