= Mycalesis anapita =

Scientific classification
- Kingdom: Animalia
- Phylum: Arthropoda
- Clade: Pancrustacea
- Class: Insecta
- Order: Lepidoptera
- Family: Nymphalidae
- Genus: Mycalesis
- Species: M. anapita

Binomial name
- Mycalesis anapita Moore, [1858]

Species of butterfly

Mycalesis anapita, the tawny bush-brown, is a species of Satyrinae butterfly described by Frederic Moore in 1858. It is found in southern Burma, southern Thailand, Peninsular Malaysia, Sumatra and Borneo.

== Description ==
The underside of the moth is orange brown in color. The edges of the forewing and hindwing display rusty-brown lines with about 11 eyespots along the wing margins. The upperside from the apex to the tornus displays deep orange brown with black forewing border.

== Ecology ==
Mycalesis anapita is known as an open grassland species that prefers well-lit areas dominated with Poaceae species. It is commonly found low to the ground, in disturbed habitats such as Acacia manfium and palm oil plantations.

The larval host plant for Mycalesis anapita caterpillars are from the family Gramineae. This species is also commonly found along service roads neighbouring primary rainforest, due to the abundance of larval host plants invading, which is also known as a disturbance corridor.
