= Mycalesis manii =

Scientific classification
- Kingdom: Animalia
- Phylum: Arthropoda
- Clade: Pancrustacea
- Class: Insecta
- Order: Lepidoptera
- Family: Nymphalidae
- Genus: Mycalesis
- Species: M. manii

Binomial name
- Mycalesis manii Doherty, 1886

Synonyms
- Mycalesis anaxias Hewitson, 1862

Species of butterfly

Mycalesis manii, the Nicobarese blind bushbrown, is a butterfly in the family Nymphalidae. It is found in the Nicobar islands of India. It was described by William Doherty in 1886. This species is monotypic.

== Description ==
The upperside forewing is fuscous and has a wide white band. The upperside hindwing is unmarked except for two submarginal lines. The underside is paler brown, having a dull violet band across the disc of the hindwing, which does not extend to the white band on the underside. The underside hindwing has seven ocelli, with the third ocellus being the smallest and the fifth ocellus the largest.

This species is differentiated from Mydosama radza by the absence of the ocellus on the upperside forewing and the violet band on the underside.
