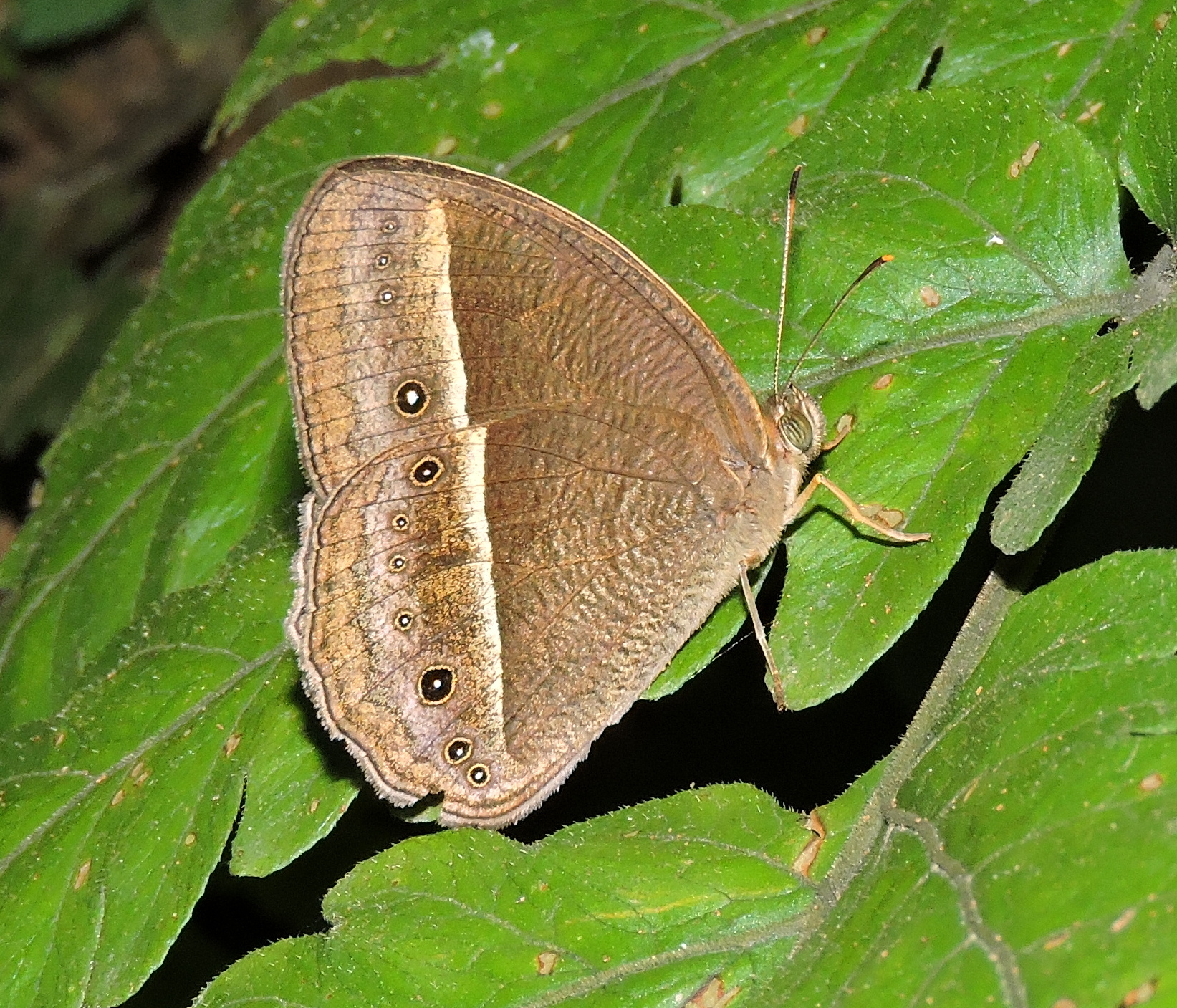

Scientific classification
- Kingdom: Animalia
- Phylum: Arthropoda
- Clade: Pancrustacea
- Class: Insecta
- Order: Lepidoptera
- Family: Nymphalidae
- Genus: Mycalesis
- Species: M. nicotia

Binomial name
- Mycalesis nicotia Hewitson, 1850

= Mycalesis nicotia =

Brighteye bushbrown

Species of butterfly

Mycalesis nicotia, the brighteye bushbrown, is a species of satyrine butterfly found in Asia.

== Description ==
Wet-season form. Upperside Vandyke brown. Forewing with one very large, white-centred, fulvous-ringed median, and one, more rarely two, similar smaller subapical ocelli. Hindwing with one or two small similar ocelli. Forewings and hindwings with subterminal and terminal pale lines. Underside pale brown, much paler in female than in male; the basal area of the wings irrorated with transverse brown striae up to a common transverse inwardly sharply defined discal white band; beyond this, a series of ocelli similar to the ocelli on the upperside, four on the front wing, the median ocellus being the largest, seven on the hindwing, the third from the tornus and the apical ocelli being the largest; terminal margins of wings slightly purpurescent, crossed by an inner and an outer subterminal and a terminal slender dark brown line, the subterminal lines being more or less zigzag and sinuous. Cilia of both forewing and hindwing pale. Antennae, head, thorax and abdomen brown; antennas ochraceous at apex. Male sex-mark in form 2, the tuft of hair overlying the specialized scales on the upperside of the hindwing black. Dry-season form. Similar. Differs in the ground colour of the underside having a more ochraceous tint, the ocelli much reduced in size or obsolescent, and the inner of the two subterminal lines being more or less obscure and faintly.
