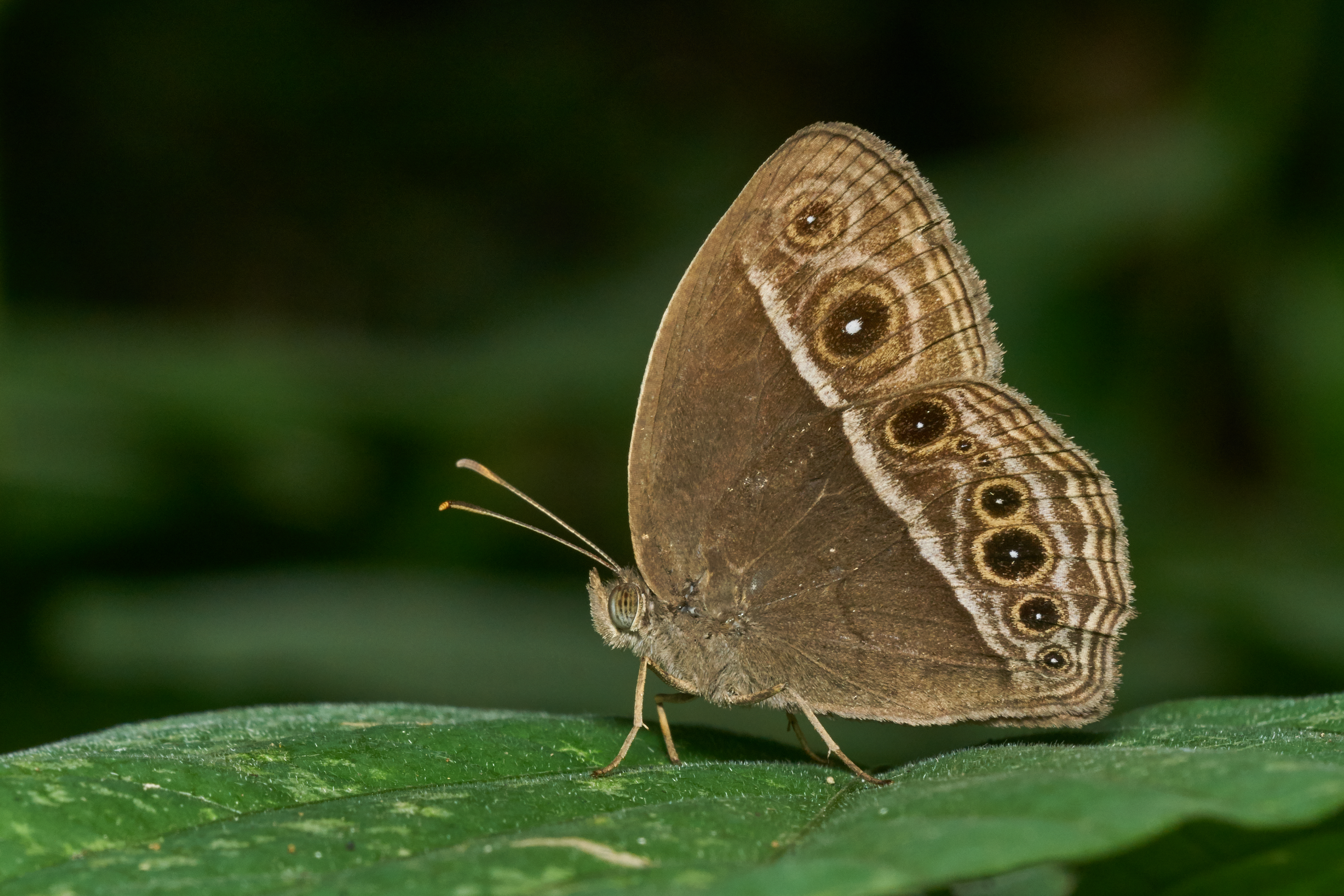
- Wet-season form
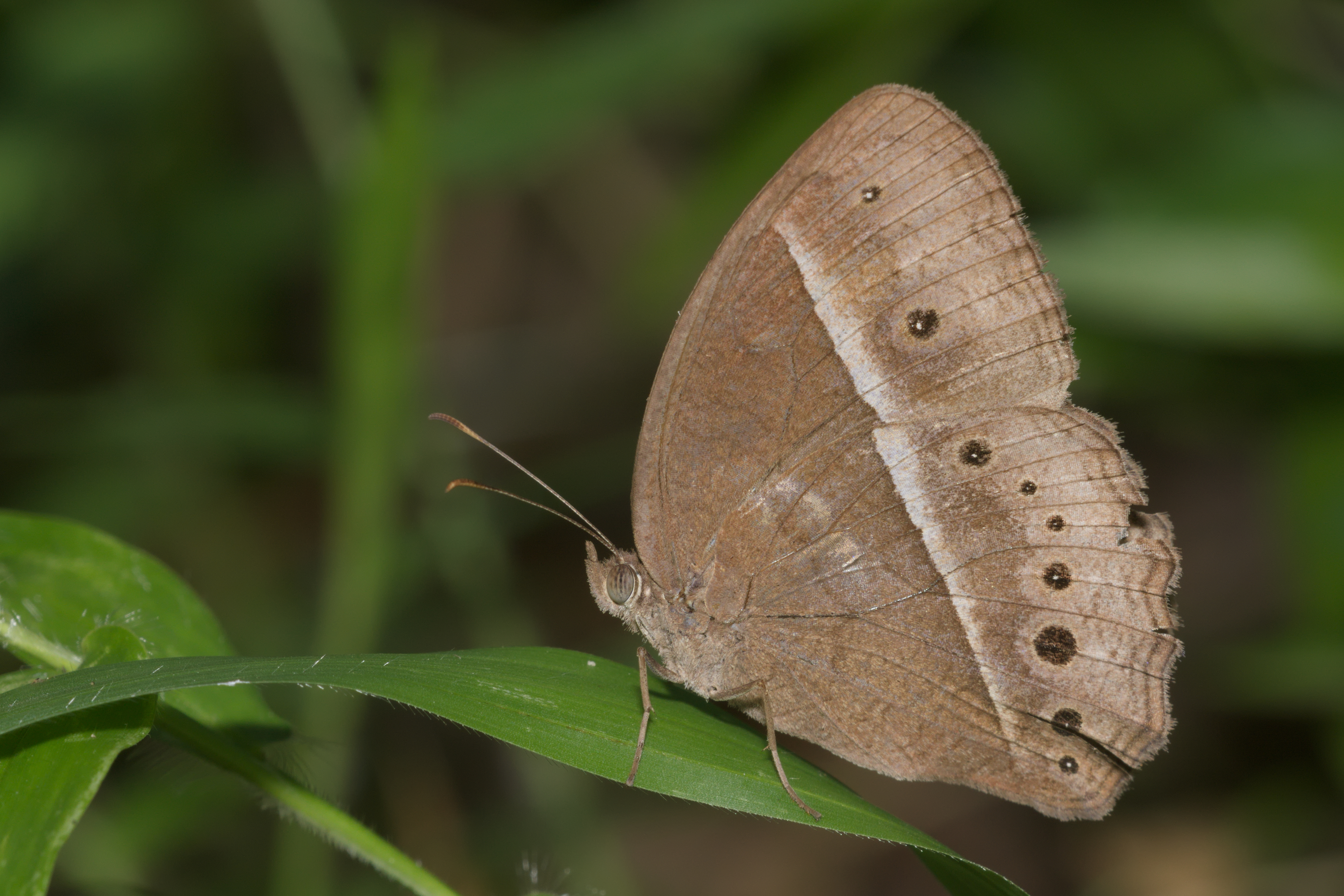
- Dry-season form both M. m. polydecta

Scientific classification
- Kingdom: Animalia
- Phylum: Arthropoda
- Class: Insecta
- Order: Lepidoptera
- Family: Nymphalidae
- Genus: Mycalesis
- Species: M. mineus

Binomial name
- Mycalesis mineus (Linnaeus, 1758)

= Mycalesis mineus =

Dark-branded bushbrown

Species of butterfly

Mycalesis mineus, the dark-brand bush brown, is a species of satyrine butterfly found in Asia.

== Description ==
Wet-season form: Upperside dark Vandyke brown; forewings and hindwings with slender subterminal and terminal pale lines. Forewing with a single white-centred, fulvous-ringed, black ocellus, generally set in a square pale area, in interspace 2, occasionally a similar smaller ocellus without any pale surrounding area in interspace 5. Hindwing uniform sometimes with one or two obscure postmedian ocelli. Underside: ground colour similar; forewings and hindwings crossed by a transverse dusky-white discal band, well-defined inwardly, diffuse outwardly, followed by a postdiscal series of ocelli surrounded by a dusky-yellowish, sometimes purplish white, line; the ocelli are similar to the ocelli on the upperside, and vary from two to four on the forewing and from five to seven (the preapical two being sometimes obsolescent) on the hindwing; of these latter the posterior four, not three as in Mycalesis perseus, are in a straight line; finally, beyond the rows of ocelli on both wings there are pale or purplish-white subterminal and terminal sinuous lines.

Dry-season form: Upperside similar to that in the wet-season form, but paler. Underside from ochraceous brown to dusky brown of a darker shade; basal half of the wings conspicuously darker than the outer portions; the whole surface irrorated (sprinkled) with fine brown striae; sometimes a distinct dark discal band crosses both wings; ocelli nearly obsolete, indicated by minute white specks, the posterior four on the hindwing in a straight line as in the wet-season form. Antennae, head, thorax and abdomen brown; the club of the antennae with black and ochraceous marks. Male sex-mark in form 1 as in M. perseus, but the patch of specialized scales on the underside of the forewing half as large again.

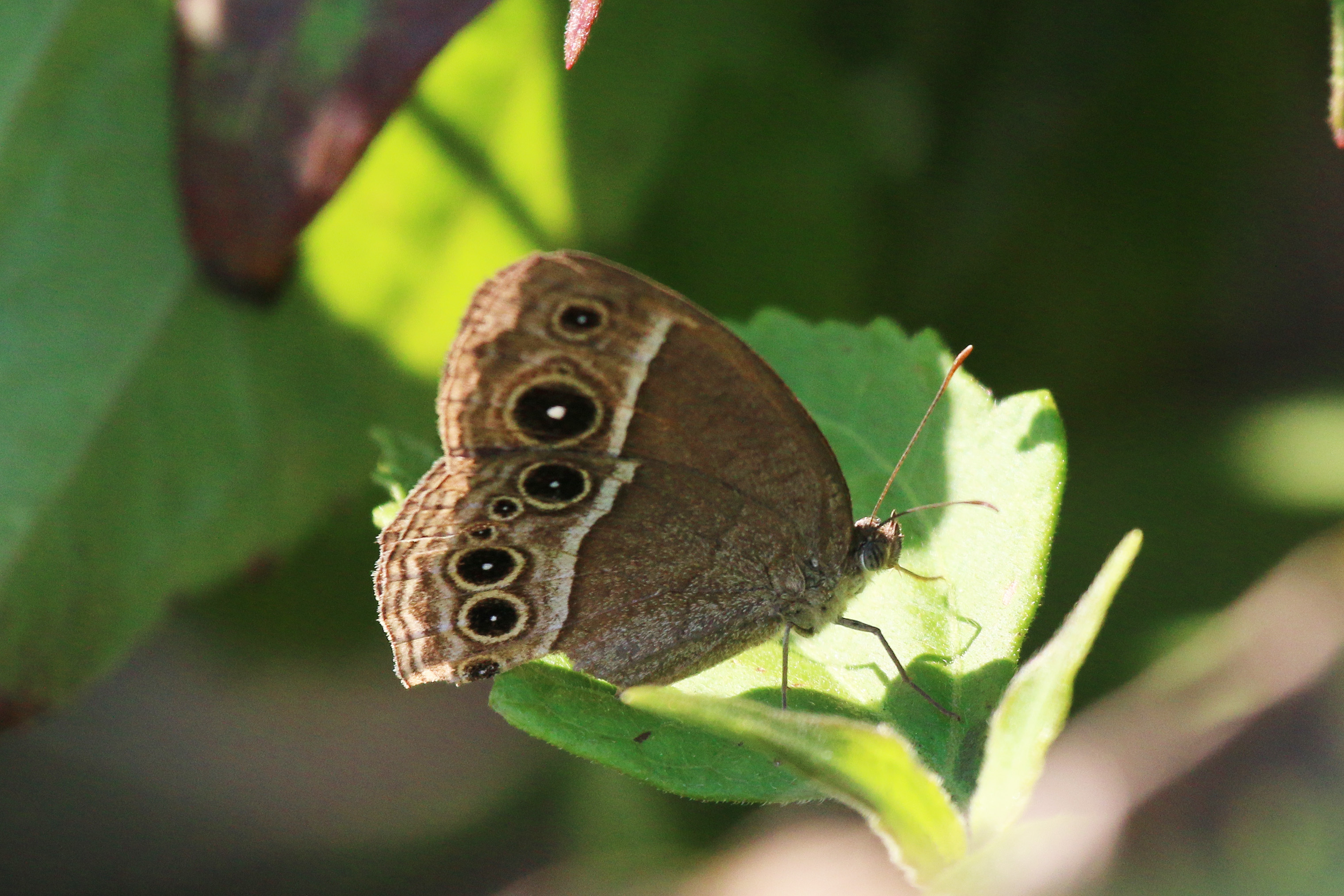
M. m. macromalayana, Indonesia

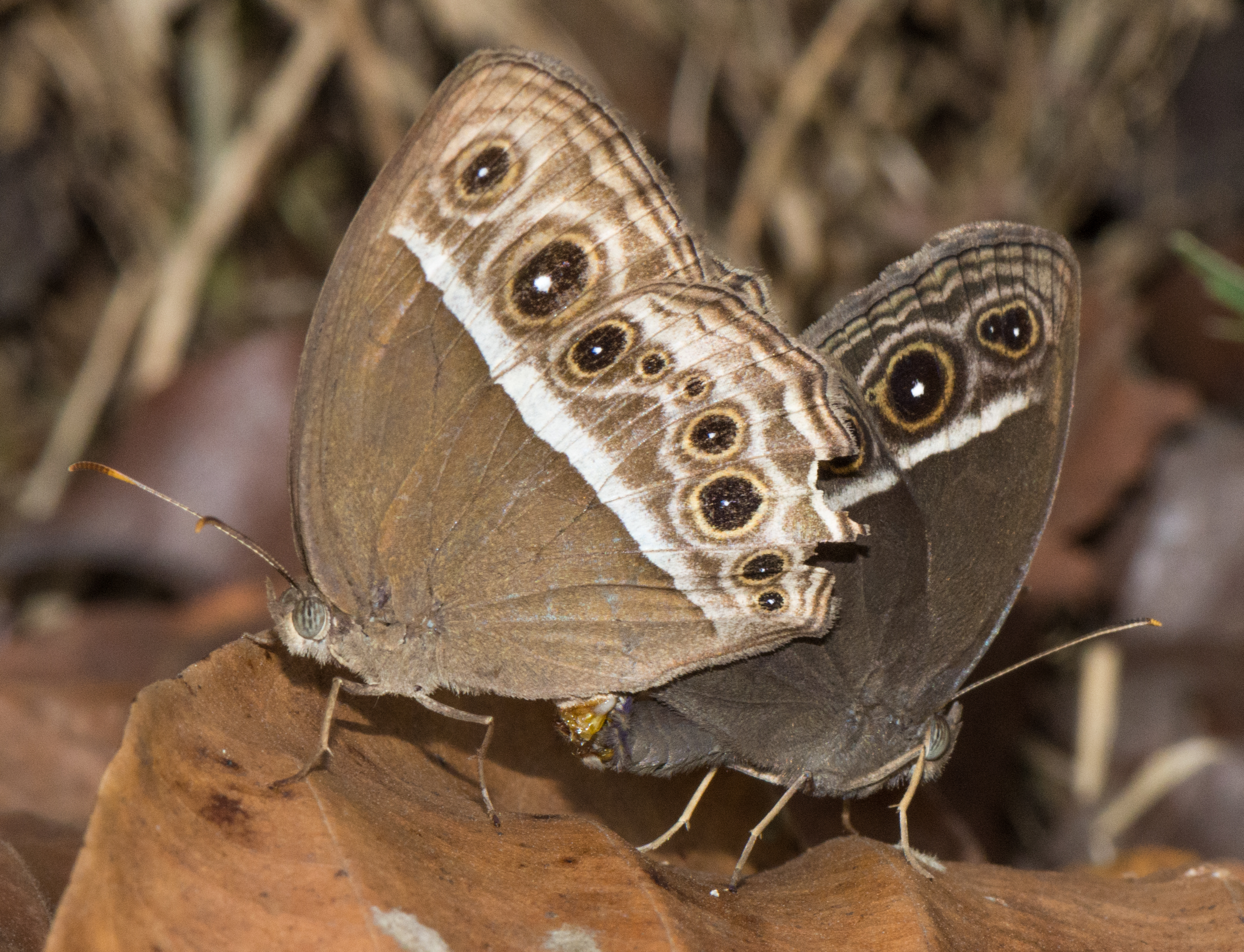
Mating pair, from Kottayam, Kerala, India

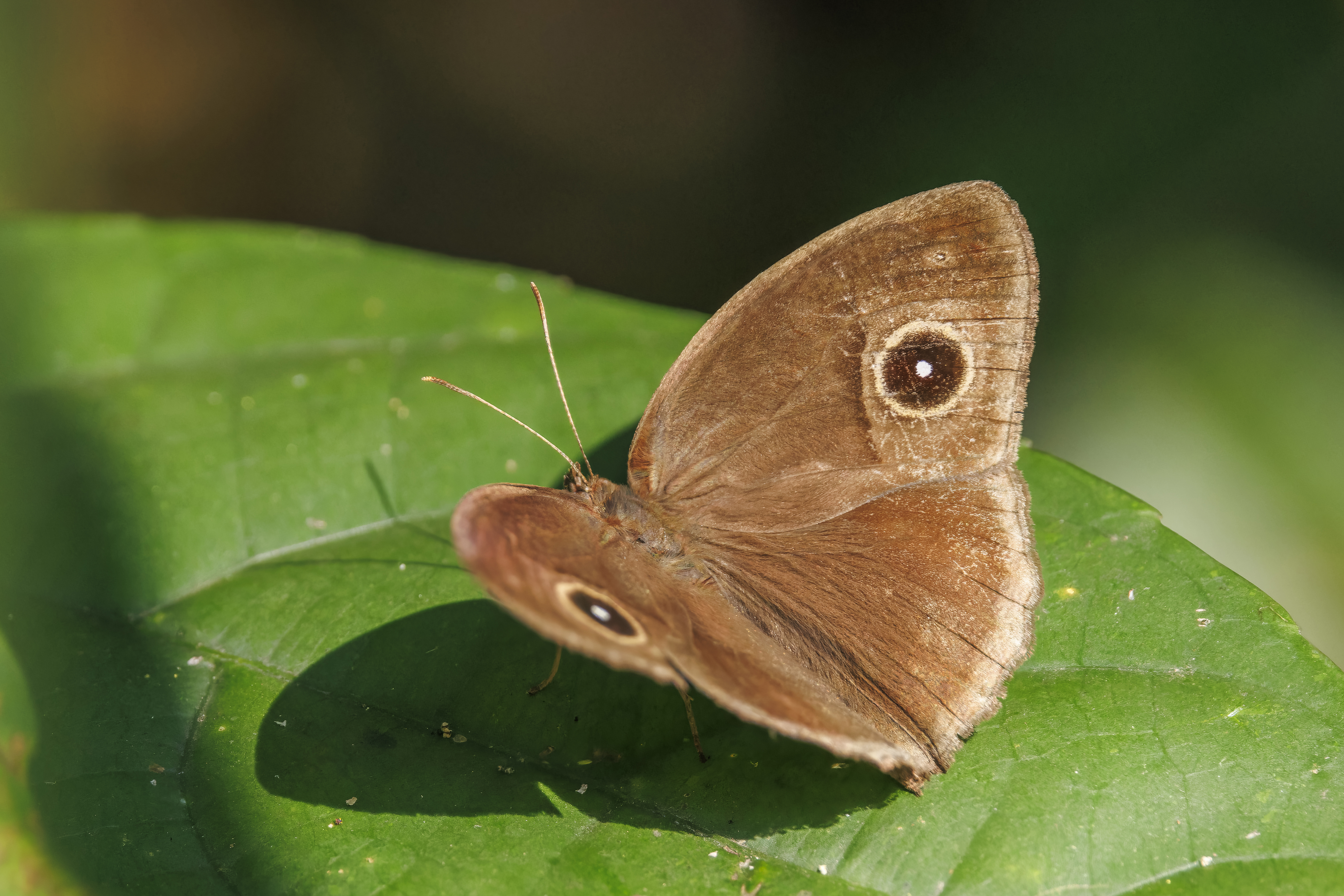
M. m. mineus, dry season form, Laos

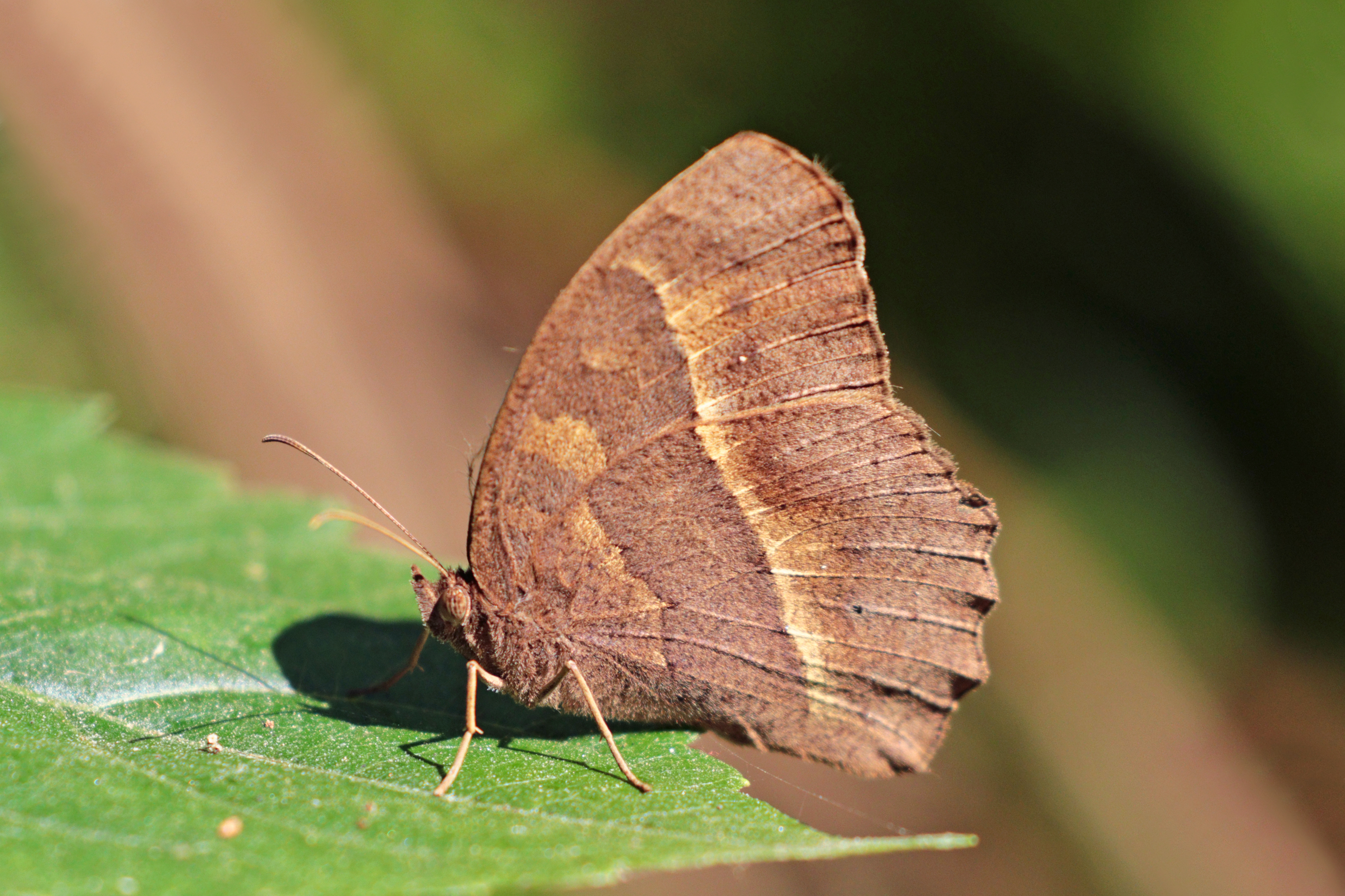
female M. m. mineus, dry season form, Nepal

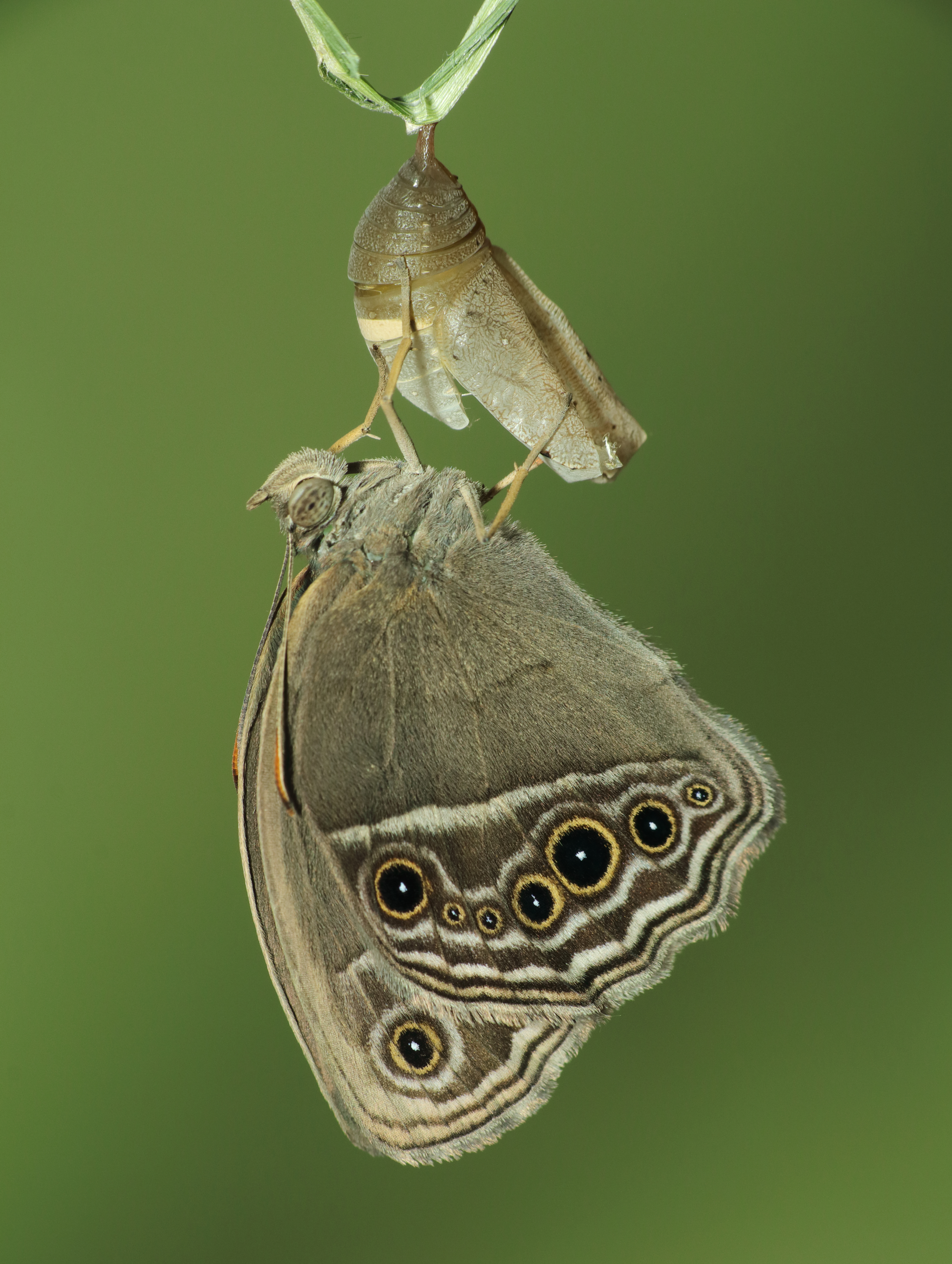
Newly eclosed
