= Curetis venata =

Scientific classification
- Kingdom: Animalia
- Phylum: Arthropoda
- Class: Insecta
- Order: Lepidoptera
- Family: Lycaenidae
- Genus: Curetis
- Species: C. venata

Binomial name
- Curetis venata Fruhstorfer, 1908

Synonyms
- Curetis insularis venata Fruhstorfer, 1908; Curetis thetis venata

Butterfly species in genus Curetis

Curetis venata is a species of butterfly in the lycaenid subfamily Curetinae. It was described by Hans Fruhstorfer in 1908 as subspecies of Curetis insularis. Its type locality is on Sulawesi, Indonesia. (Note: "Patria: Nord-Celebes 2 ♂♂, 1 ♀. Toli-Toli, Nov. Dez. 1895.") Subspecies Curetis venata saleyerensis is known from Selayar Island.

== Description ==
All wings with a black longitudinal stripe at the cell apex, veins of both pairs of wings distinctly black-edged up to the middle of the wings, characteristics that are not repeated in any other Curetis. Hindwings completely black, forewings only with an obsolete yellowish median stripe.(Fruhstorfer, H., 1908. Neue Curetis und uebersicht der bekannten Arten. Stettiner entomologische Zeitung 69: 49–59)

== Subspecies ==
Curetis venata has two known subspecies:

- Curetis venata venata
- Curetis venata saleyerensis Chapman, 1915
