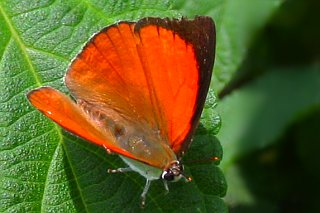

Scientific classification
- Kingdom: Animalia
- Phylum: Arthropoda
- Class: Insecta
- Order: Lepidoptera
- Family: Lycaenidae
- Genus: Curetis
- Species: C. thetis

Binomial name
- Curetis thetis (Drury, 1773)

Synonyms
- Papilio thetis Drury, 1773; Papilio cinyra Cramer, [1779]; Papilio thetys [sic] Drury; Hesperia aesopus Fabricius, 1781; Hesperia phaedrus Fabricius, 1781; Polyommatus phaedrus (Fabricius); Phaedra terricola Horsfield, [1829]; Anops thetys [sic] Moore, [1858]; Curetis arcuata Moore, [1884]; Curetis phaedrus (Fabricius)

= Curetis thetis =

Indian sunbeam

Species of butterfly

Curetis thetis, the Indian sunbeam, is a species of lycaenid or red butterfly found in Indomalayan realm.

== Distribution ==
The butterfly occurs in Peninsular India, south of the Himalayas, but not in the desert tracts or in areas with a scanty rainfall; parts of Assam; Saurashtra; Bengal, Sylhet onto Myanmar. It is also found in the Nicobar Islands.

It is also found in Sri Lanka, Java, Philippines, northern Sulawesi and Selajar.

== Status ==
It is not considered rare.

== Description ==
=== Male ===
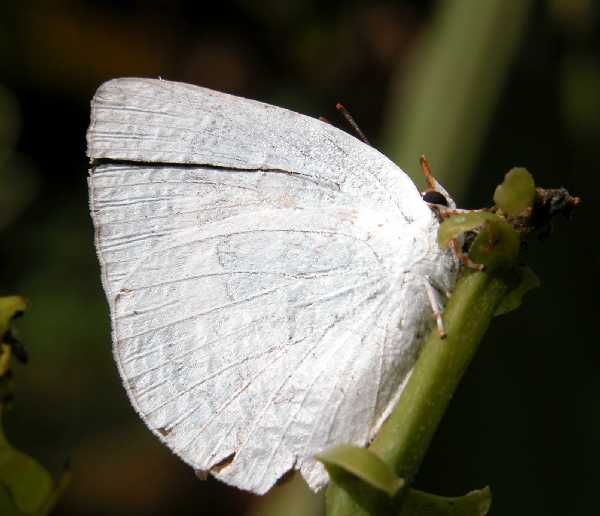
Indian sunbeam Underside photographed in Bangalore, India

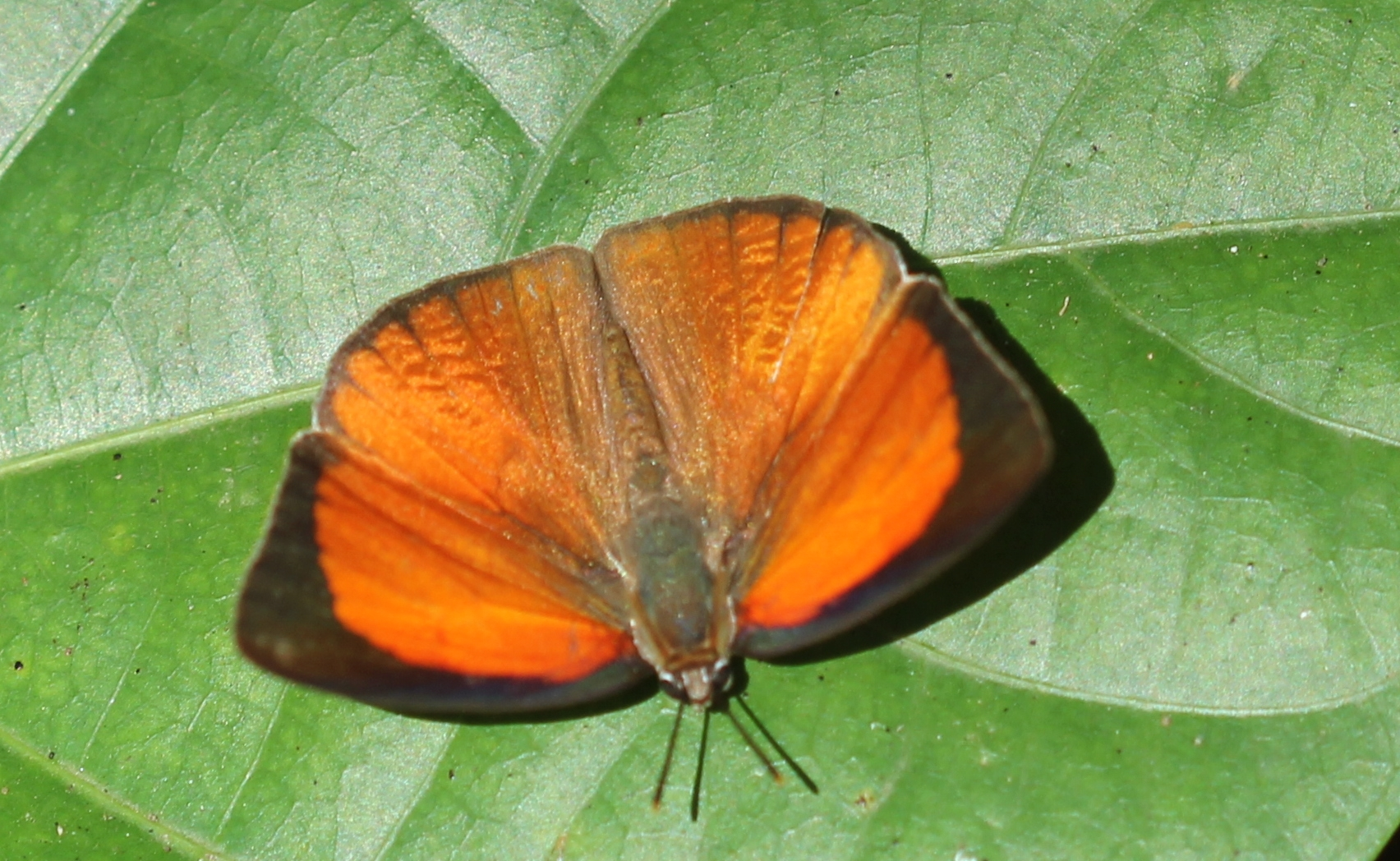
At Silent Valley National Park

Upperside dark cupreous red, glossy and shining. Forewing: base irrorated with dusky scales; costa edged with a narrow, inwardly jagged, jet-black band that broadens to the apex, thence continued along the termen, decreasing in width to the tornus; opposite the apex the inner edge of the black is acutely angulate. Hindwing: base and dorsum broadly but slightly irrorated (sprinkled) with dusky scales; costa narrowly, dorsal margin more broadly pale; termen very narrowly and evenly margined with black.

Underside: shining silvery white. Forewings and hindwings crossed transversely by discal and inner subterminal, somewhat lunular dark lines and a more or less obsolescent outer subterminal line of minute dark dots. These markings generally very indistinct but traceable; in some specimens more clearly defined but never prominent. Antennae, head, thorax and abdomen dusky black; the antennae reddish at apex; in some specimens the head, the thorax laterally and the base of the abdomen brownish-mouse colour; beneath: the palpi, thorax and the basal half of the abdomen medially silvery white, the sides and apex of the abdomen dusky black.

=== Female ===
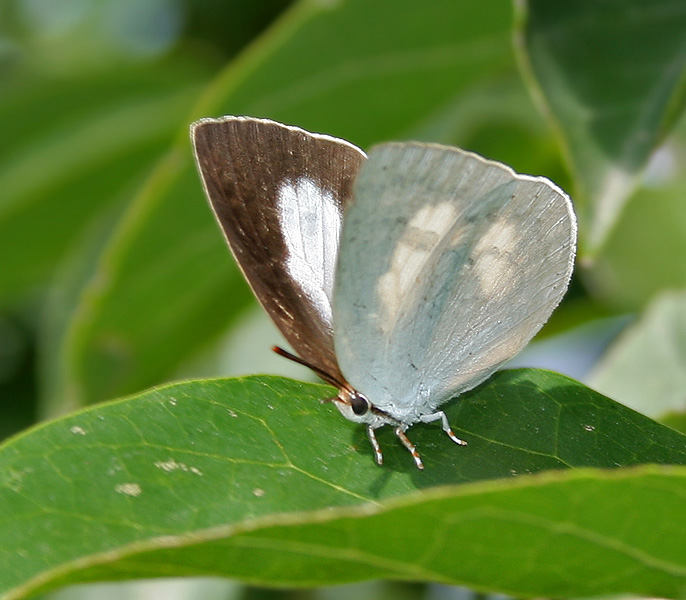
Female in Hyderabad, India

Upperside: forewing dark brownish black; a large medial patch that extends from vein 1 to vein 4, enters the lower half of the cell and extends from base outwards for about two-thirds the length of the wing, white; at the base of the wing this patch is shaded and obscured for a short distance by dusky black. Hindwing: pale dusky black; a darker, short, broad brownish-black streak from base along the subcostal vein, that outwardly broadens into an irregularly round patch beyond which is a broad short upper discal white band with ill-defined and somewhat diffuse margins. Cilia, forewings and hindwings: white. Underside: as in the male but the markings still more indistinct, and in almost no specimen is there any trace of the outer subterminal line of dark dots.

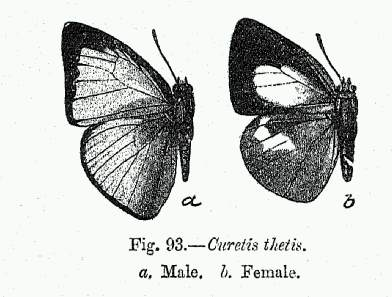

=== Variety arcuata ===
Variety arcuata Moore, differs from typical thetis as follows:

=== Male ===
Upperside: ground colour similar but of a slightly paler shade in all the specimens I have seen. Forewing: costal and terminal margins edged more broadly with black than in thetis, the inner margin of this colour forms a regular strongly curved arch from base of wing to tornus, not angulate at all opposite apex of wing, the edging of the costal margin not jagged on the inner side. Hindwing: the costal margin not pale but somewhat broadly dusky black; the terminal black edging broader than in thetis, not linear, produced for a very short distance up each vein. The irroration of dusky scales at the bases of both forewings and hindwings and along the dorsal area of the hindwing heavier and more broadly diffused, especially on the latter. Underside: as in the typical form. Antenna, head, thorax and abdomen similar.

=== Female ===
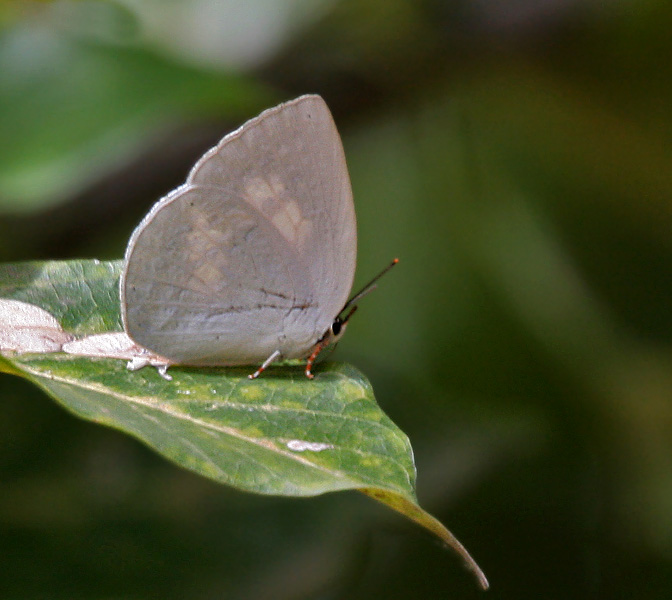
Female in Hyderabad, India

Upperside: ground colour darker brownish black, deep opaque black on the costa, apex and termen of the forewing; the medial oval white patch on the forewing smaller, the upper discal white band on the hindwing narrower, the short, broad black streak from base terminates in a large round spot or patch inwardly merged in the ground colour which fills the whole area of the cell.

There have been reports of gynandromorphic forms.

== Life history ==
=== Food plants ===
The larva has been recorded as feeding on Pongamia glabra, Derris scandens, Abrus precatorius (Leguminosae), Xylia dolabriformis and Heynia trijuga (Meliaceae).

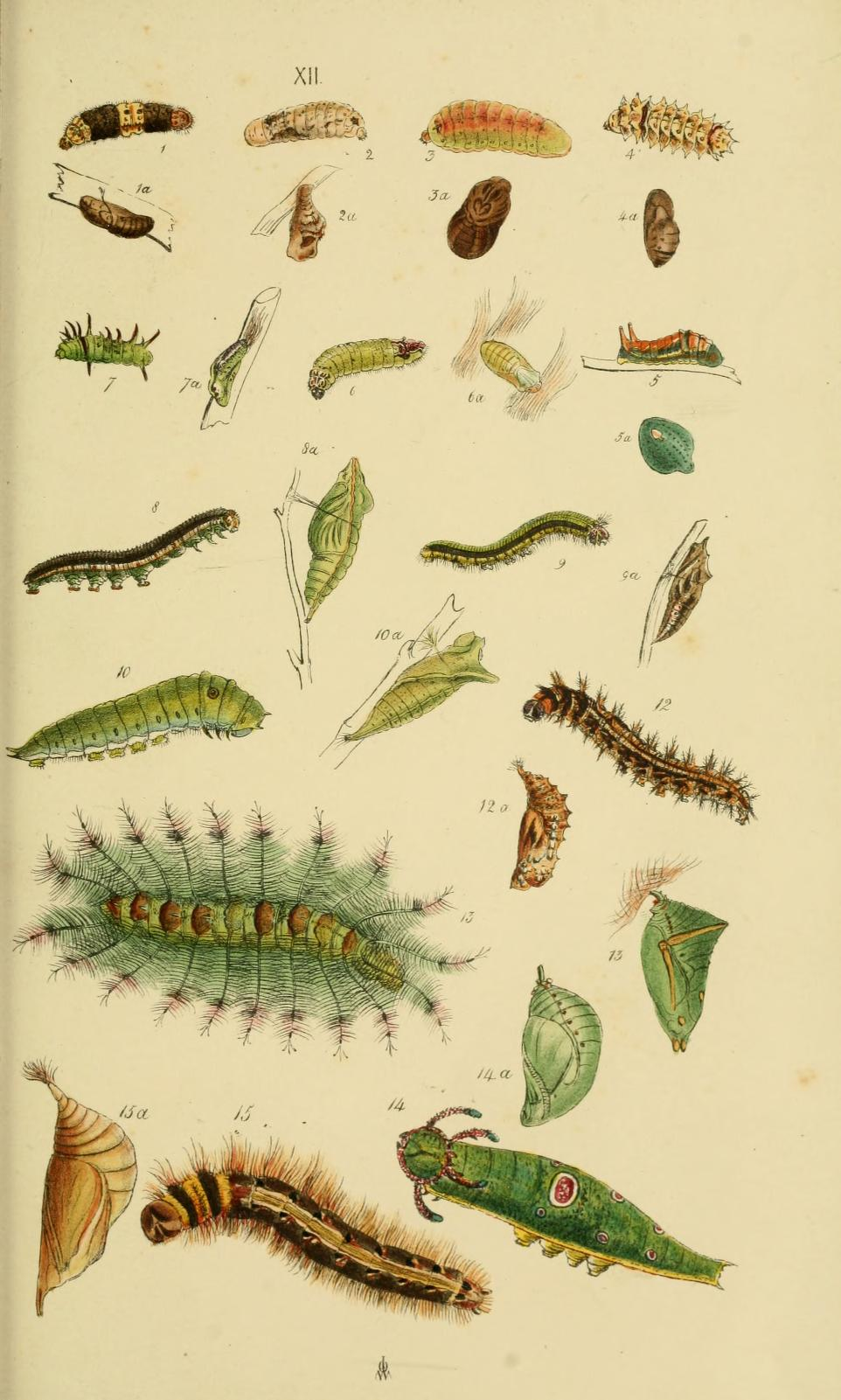
Larva (7), pupa (7a)

=== Larva ===
On emergence eats a hole through the top of the egg about equalling one-third of its surface and crawls out. The empty shell has a close superficial resemblance to an echinus shell. In colour pale ochreous, furnished with long stout white hairs of which a subdorsal series is on each side, with one long hair springing from the apex of each tubercle; there are, besides, other lateral series and numerous hairs projecting forwards in front of the head and backwards over the anal segment. The full-grown larva is the most beautiful known to me among the Lycaenidae.....of the exact shade of green of the leaves on which it feeds..... The second segment is quite unmarked; the third to the thirteenth have a subdorsal series of short oblique pale yellowish-green lines between which the ground-colour is paler than the rest of the body; there is a dark green dorsal line; on each side of the ninth segment there is a prominent pure dead-white, somewhat diamond-shaped mark.

— de Nicéville

De Niceville goes on to say that the sheaths of the tentacles on the twelfth segment are pale green, the tentacles themselves maroon, the whorl of hairs at their apices white with their basal thirds black.

The larvae have tentacular organs as seen on myrmecophilous lycaenids, but they have not been observed to be tended by ants.

=== Pupa ===
Light green; wing-cases bluish green. "There is a conspicuous heart-shaped pale ochreous mark on the top of the thorax, the pits on it filled in with reddish pigment." (de Nicéville.) The pupae are capable of producing sounds and the function of these are not fully understood.

== Gallery ==
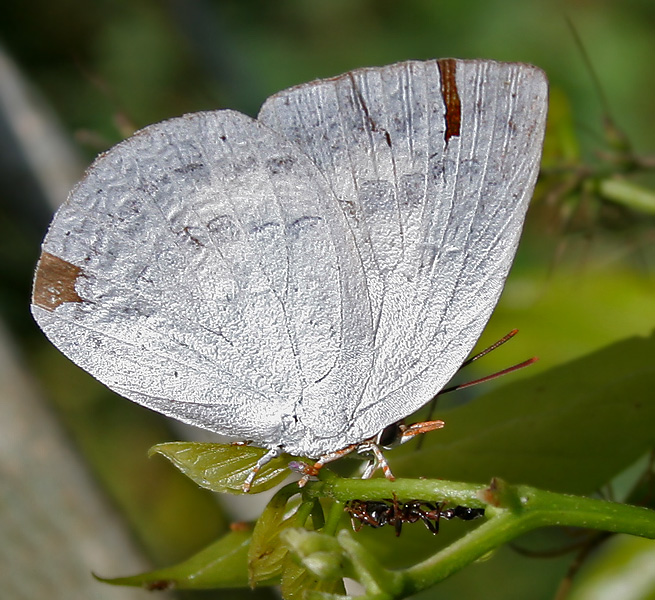
Male in Narsapur, Medak district, India

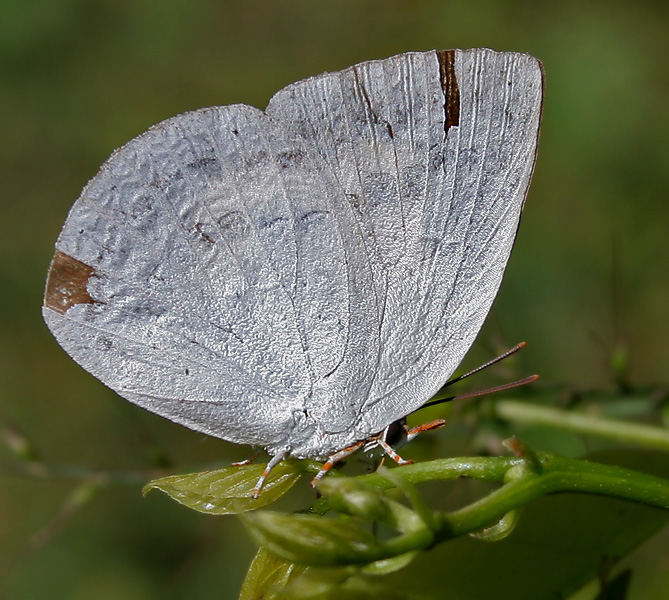
Male in Narsapur, Medak district, India

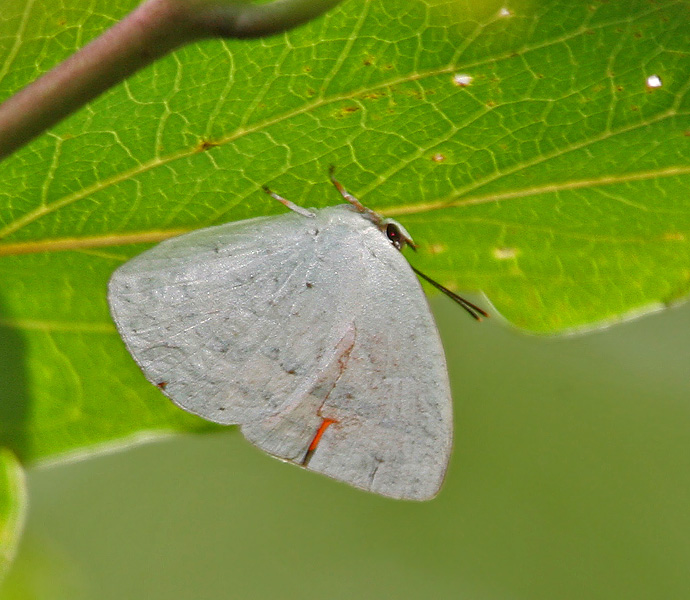
Male in Hyderabad, India

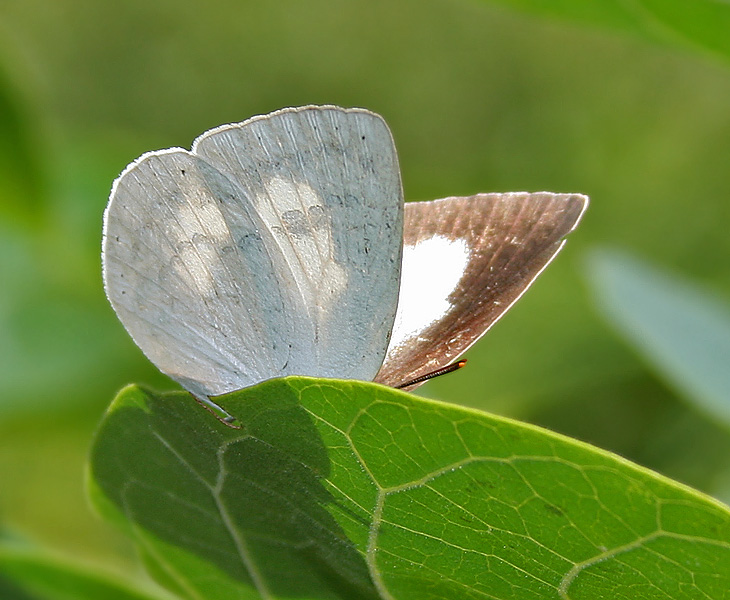
Female in Hyderabad, India

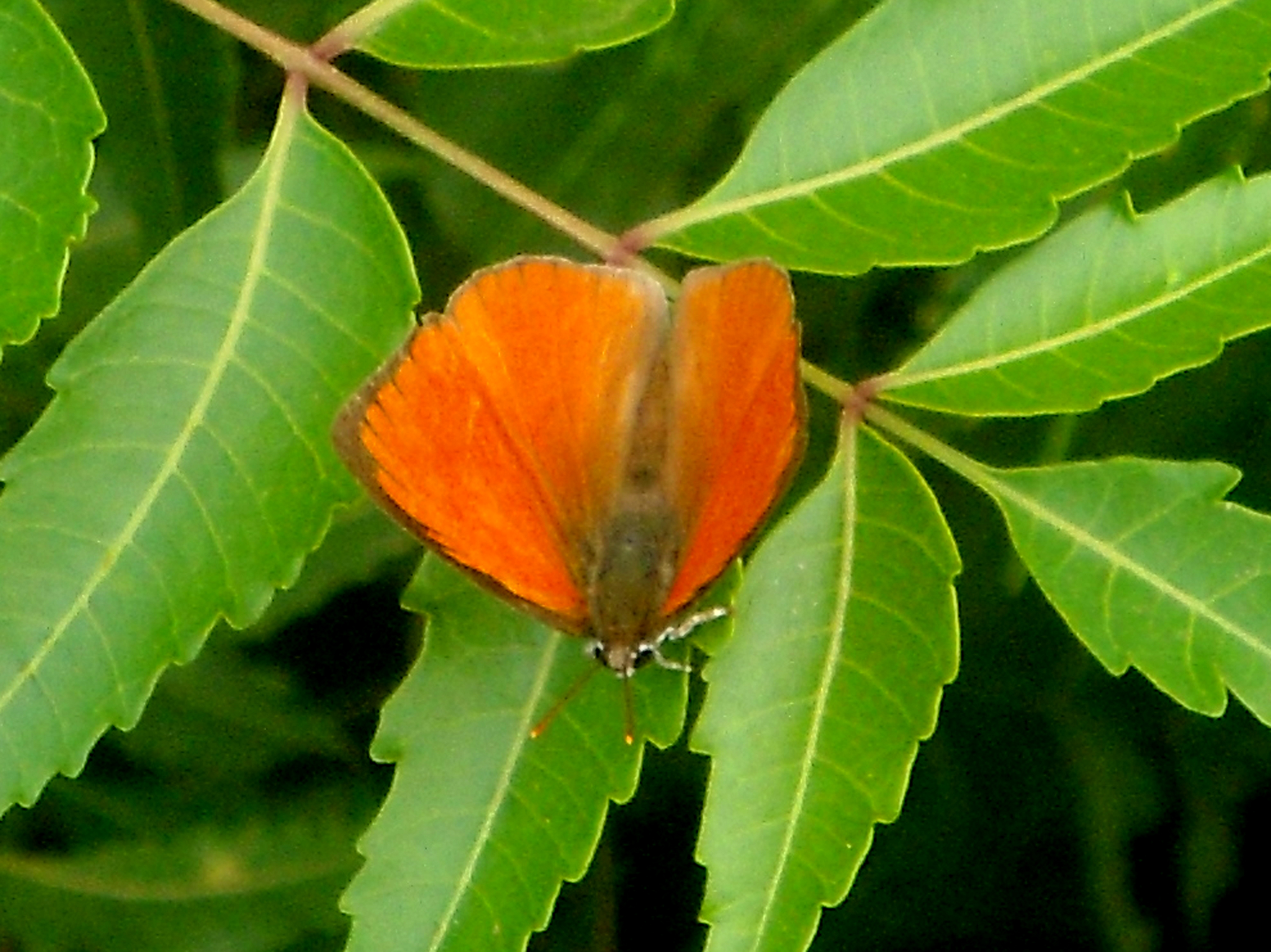
Along the Eastern Ghats, Visakhapatnam, India

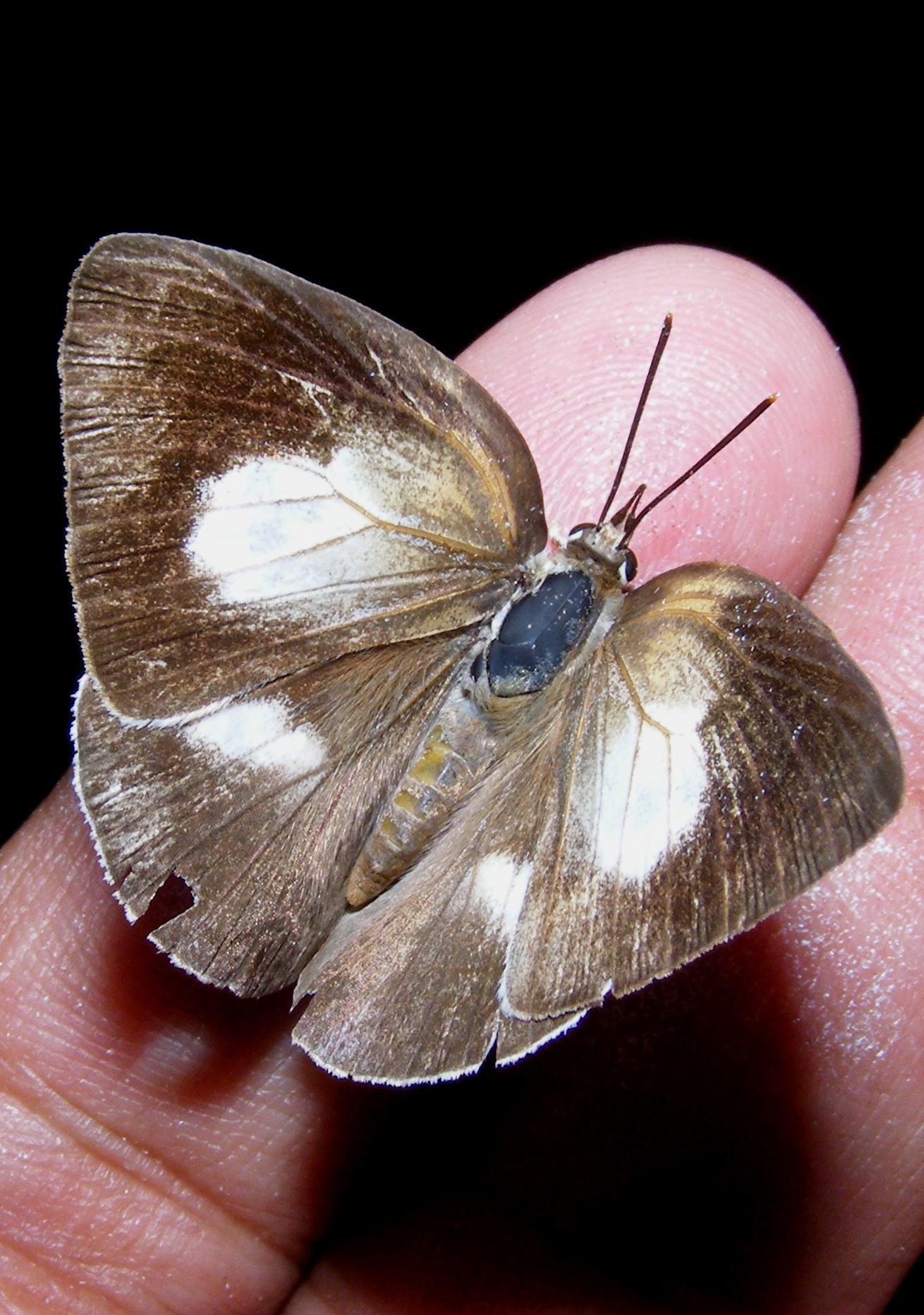

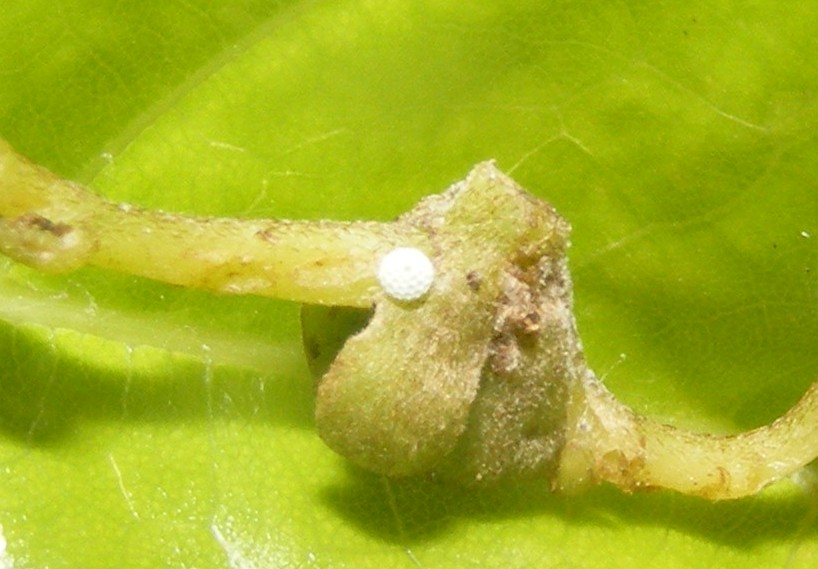

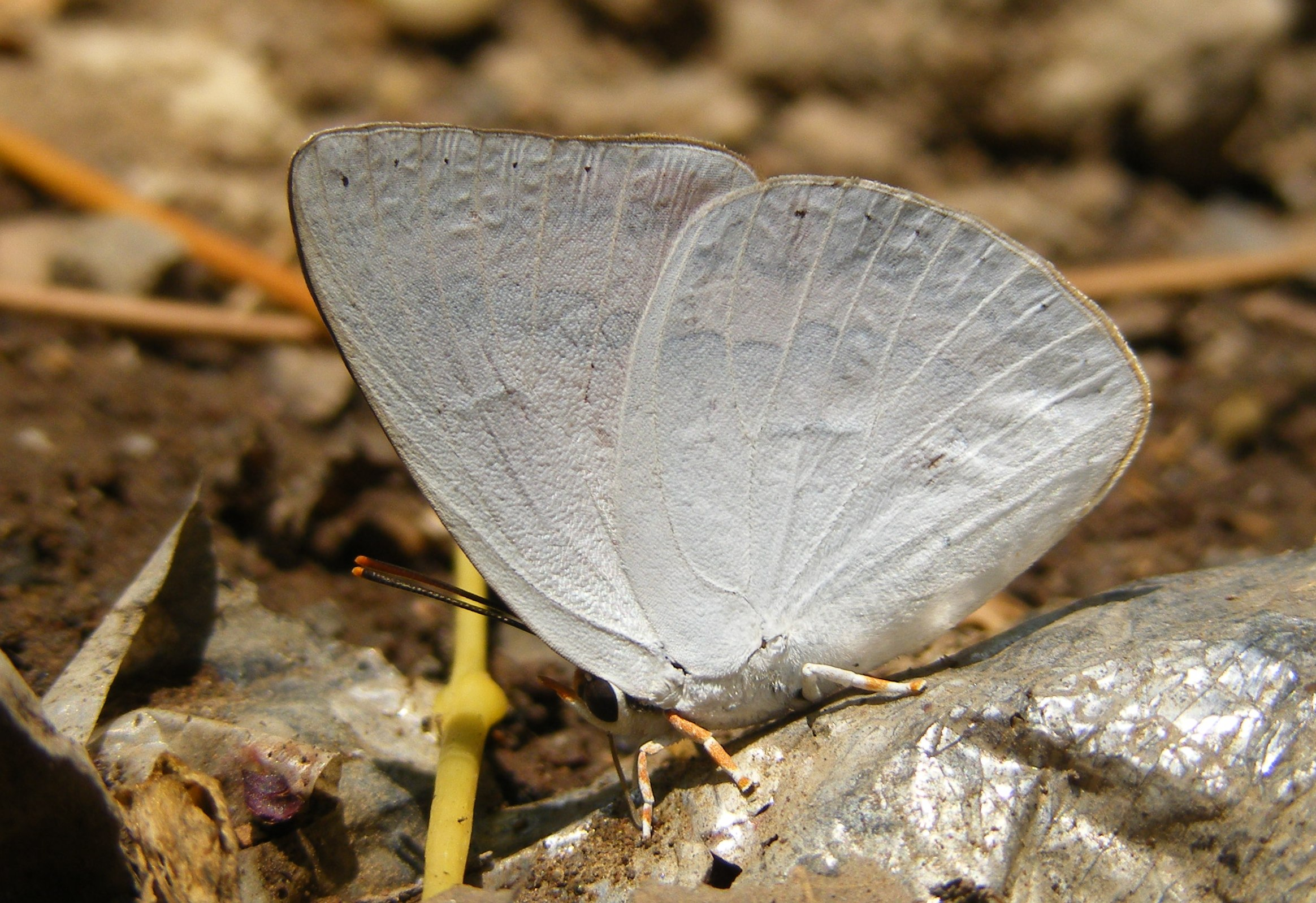

== See also ==
- List of butterflies of India (Lycaenidae)
