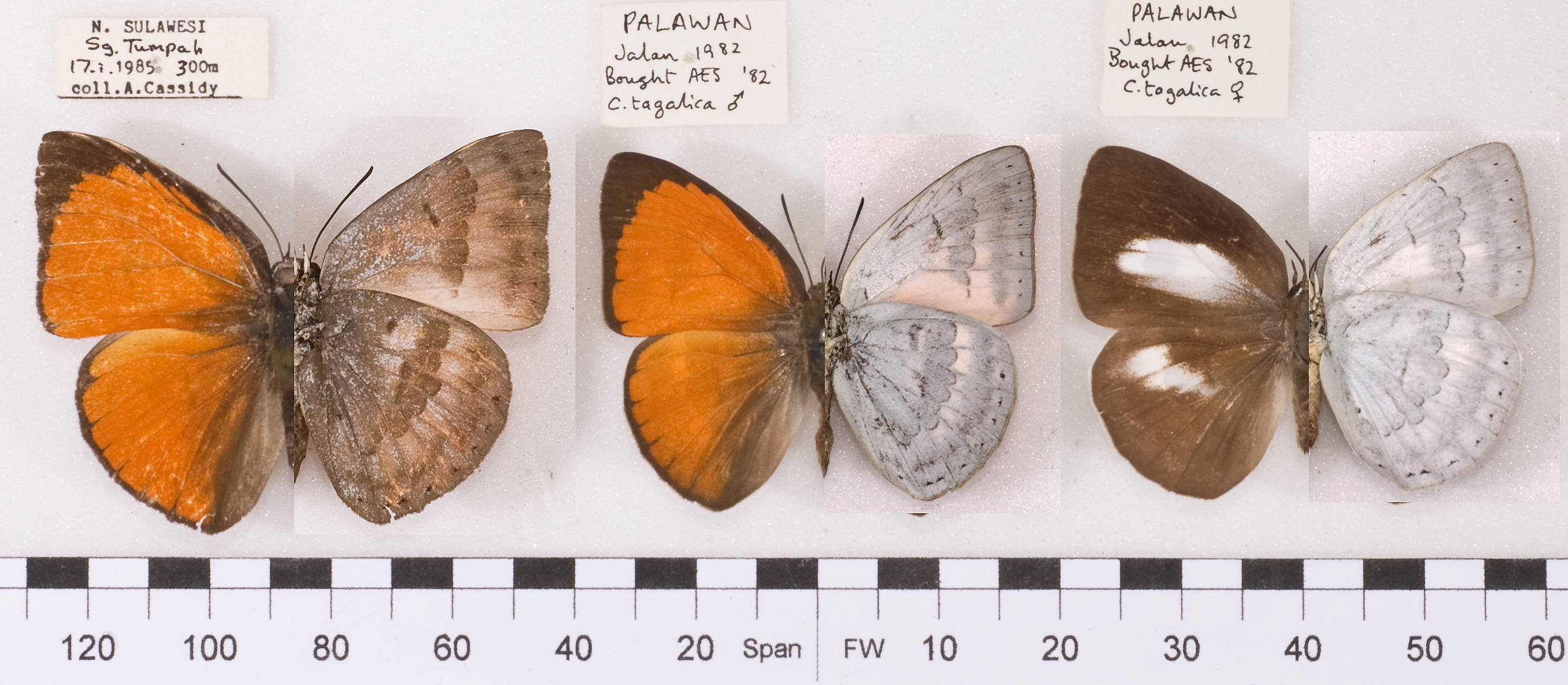

Scientific classification
- Kingdom: Animalia
- Phylum: Arthropoda
- Class: Insecta
- Order: Lepidoptera
- Family: Lycaenidae
- Genus: Curetis
- Species: C. tagalica

Binomial name
- Curetis tagalica C. Felder & R. Felder, 1862.

Synonyms
- Phaedra tagalica C. & R. Felder, 1862; Phaedra obsoleta C. & R. Felder, 1862; Curetis thetis aurantiaca Fruhstorfer, 1900; Curetis insularis izabella Fruhstorfer, 1900; Curetis insularis camotina Fruhstorfer, 1908; Curetis insularis jolona Fruhstorfer, 1908; Anops celebensis C. & R. Felder, [1865]; Curetis eos Röber, 1887; Curetis tagalica var. dohertyi Chapman, 1915; Curetis celebensis ab. itamus Ribbe, 1926; Curetis celebensis kalawara Ribbe, 1926; Curetis thetys var. palawanica Staudinger, 1889; Curetis insularis hera Fruhstorfer, 1900; Curetis insularis jopa Fruhstorfer, 1908; Curetis insularis insularis f. eda Fruhstorfer, 1908; Curetis tagalica var. talautensis Chapman, 1915; Curetis labuana Evans, 1954; Curetis tagalica vietnamitica Inoue & Kawazoe, 1965

= Curetis tagalica =

Species of butterfly

Curetis tagalica, the southern sunbeam, is a species of butterfly belonging to the lycaenid family. It is found in Southeast Asia (Philippines, Celebes, Palawan, Balabac, Borneo, Sumatra, Javan, Peninsular Malaya and Thailand).It has very light red (more miniate) ground colour in which the costal margin is but narrowly bordered with black, the distal margin almost linearly so.

== Subspecies ==
- Curetis tagalica tagalica (Philippines)
- Curetis tagalica celebensis (C. & R. Felder, [1865]) (Sulawesi)
- Curetis tagalica palawanica Staudinger, 1889 (Palawan, Balabac)
- Curetis tagalica hera Fruhstorfer, 1900 (Nias)
- Curetis tagalica jopa Fruhstorfer, 1908 (Borneo, Sumatra, Javan, Peninsular Malaysia, Thailand)
- Curetis tagalica talautensis Chapman, 1915 (Talaud)
- Curetis tagalica brunnescens Ribbe, 1926 (Sula, Bangka)
- Curetis tagalica labuana Evans, 1954 (Labuan, Pulau Tioman, Natuna)
- Curetis tagalica takanamii Schröder & Treadaway, 1989 (Sibutu)
