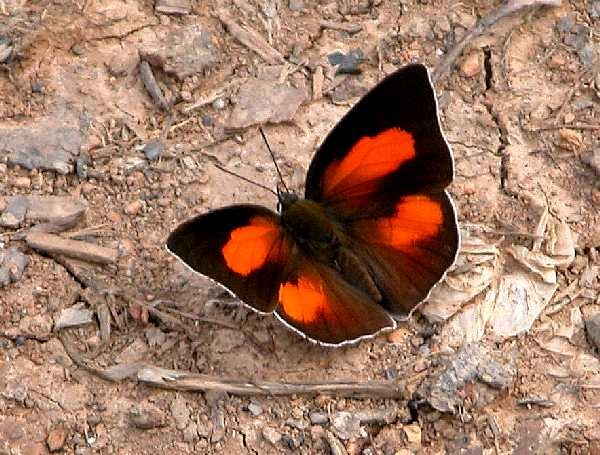
- Bright sunbeam (Curetis bulis)

Scientific classification
- Kingdom: Animalia
- Phylum: Arthropoda
- Class: Insecta
- Order: Lepidoptera
- Family: Lycaenidae
- Subfamily: Curetinae; Distant, 1884
- Genus: Curetis; Hübner, [1819]

Species
- Several, see text

Synonyms
- Curetus (lapsus); Phaedra Horsfield, 1829; Anops Boisduval, 1836

= Curetis =

Butterfly genus in family Lycaenidae

Curetis, the sunbeams, is a genus of gossamer-winged butterflies (Lycaenidae) from Southeast Asia. They are presently the only genus in the subfamily Curetinae.

== Selected species ==
- Curetis acuta - angled sunbeam
  - Curetis acuta formosana Fruhstorfer, 1908
- Curetis brunnea Wileman, 1909
- Curetis barsine Felder, 1860
- Curetis bulis - bright sunbeam
- Curetis dentata - toothed sunbeam
- Curetis discalis Moore, 1879
- Curetis felderi Distant, 1884
- Curetis freda Eliot, 1959
- Curetis honesta Fruhstorfer, 1908
- Curetis insularis (Horsfield, 1829)
- Curetis latipicta Fruhstorfer, 1908
- Curetis minima Distant & Pryer, 1887
- Curetis naga Evans, 1954
- Curetis nesophila C. & R. Felder, 1862
- Curetis nisias Fruhstorfer, 1908
- Curetis regula
- Curetis santana
- Curetis saronis - Burmese sunbeam
- Curetis semilimbata Fruhstorfer, 1908
- Curetis siva - Shiva's sunbeam
- Curetis sperthis (C. & R. Felder, 1865)
- Curetis tagalica (C. & R. Felder, 1862)
- Curetis thetis - Indian sunbeam
- Curetis tonkina Evans, 1954
- Curetis venata Fruhstorfer, 1908
