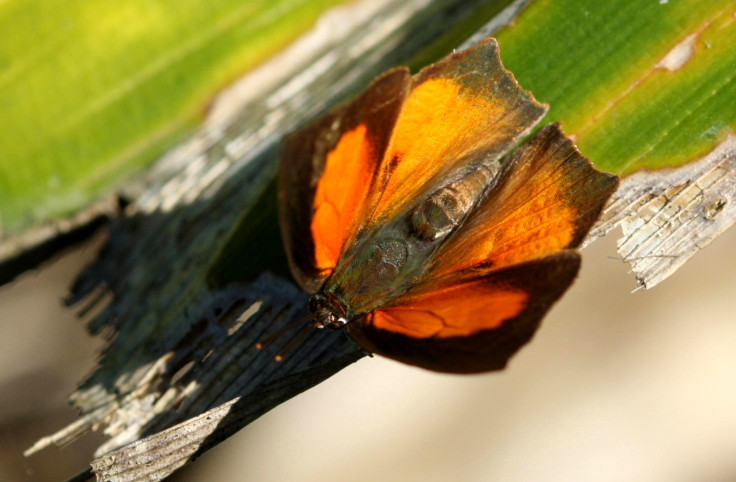
- Male
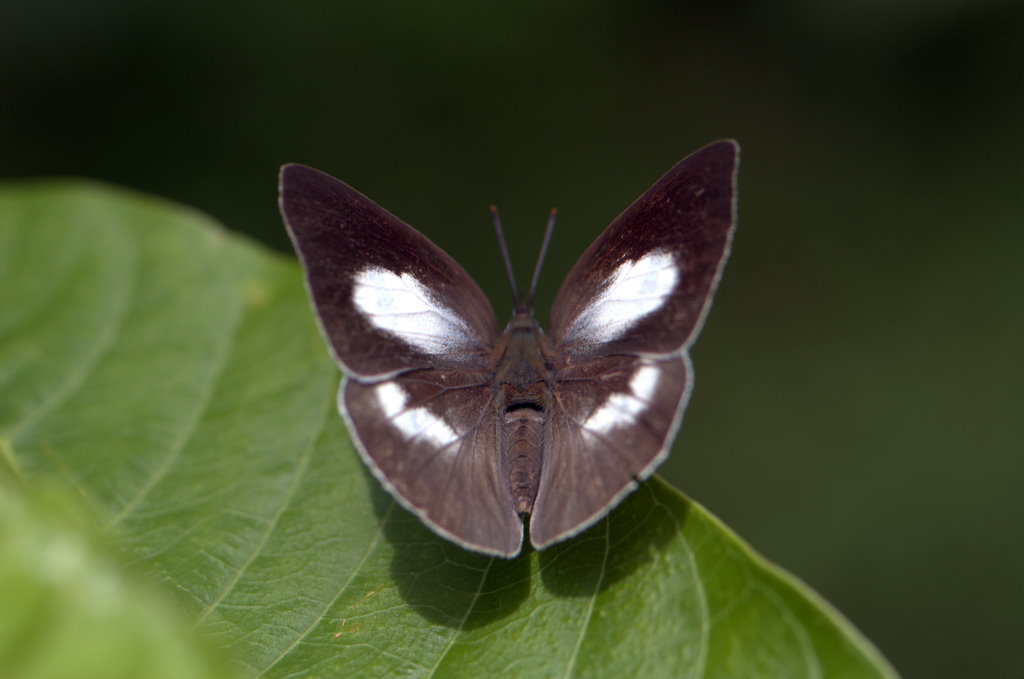
- Female

Scientific classification
- Kingdom: Animalia
- Phylum: Arthropoda
- Clade: Pancrustacea
- Class: Insecta
- Order: Lepidoptera
- Family: Lycaenidae
- Genus: Curetis
- Species: C. acuta

Binomial name
- Curetis acuta Moore, 1877

Synonyms
- Curetus acuta (lapsus); Curetis dentata Moore, 1879

= Curetis acuta =

Angled sunbeam

Species of butterfly

Curetis acuta, the angled sunbeam, is a species of butterfly belonging to the lycaenid family. It is found in Indomalayan realm. Curetis acuta is sexually dimorphic, the sexes differing in dorsal coloration of the wings, however their ventral wings are similar and of silver color which reflects sunlight. The reflection of light by silver ventral wings plays a role of signalling during flight, camouflage while at rest or during hibernation, and lowering body temperatures by reflecting the sunlight.

== Description ==
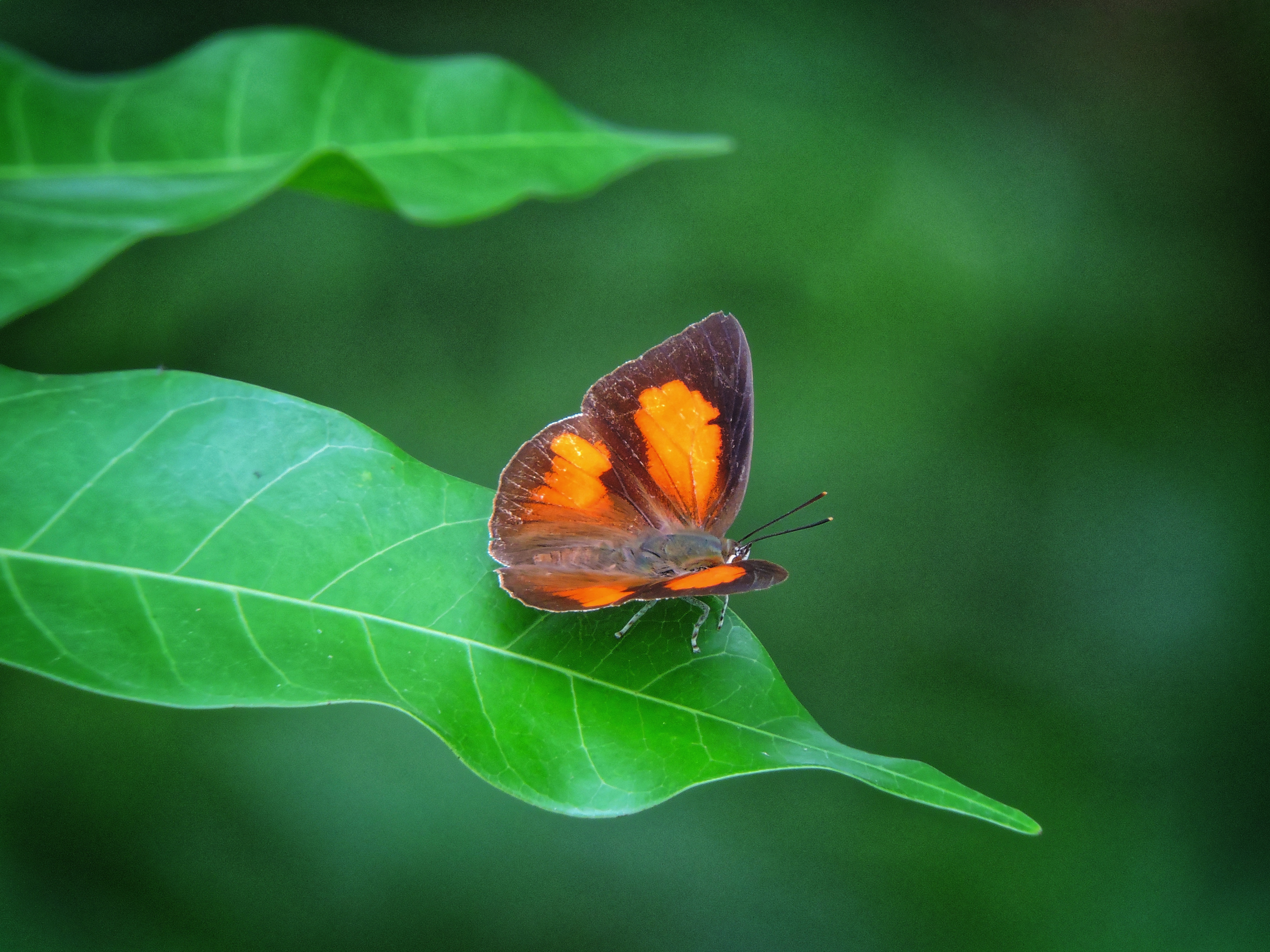
Male. Upperside orange-red with a slight bronzy gloss

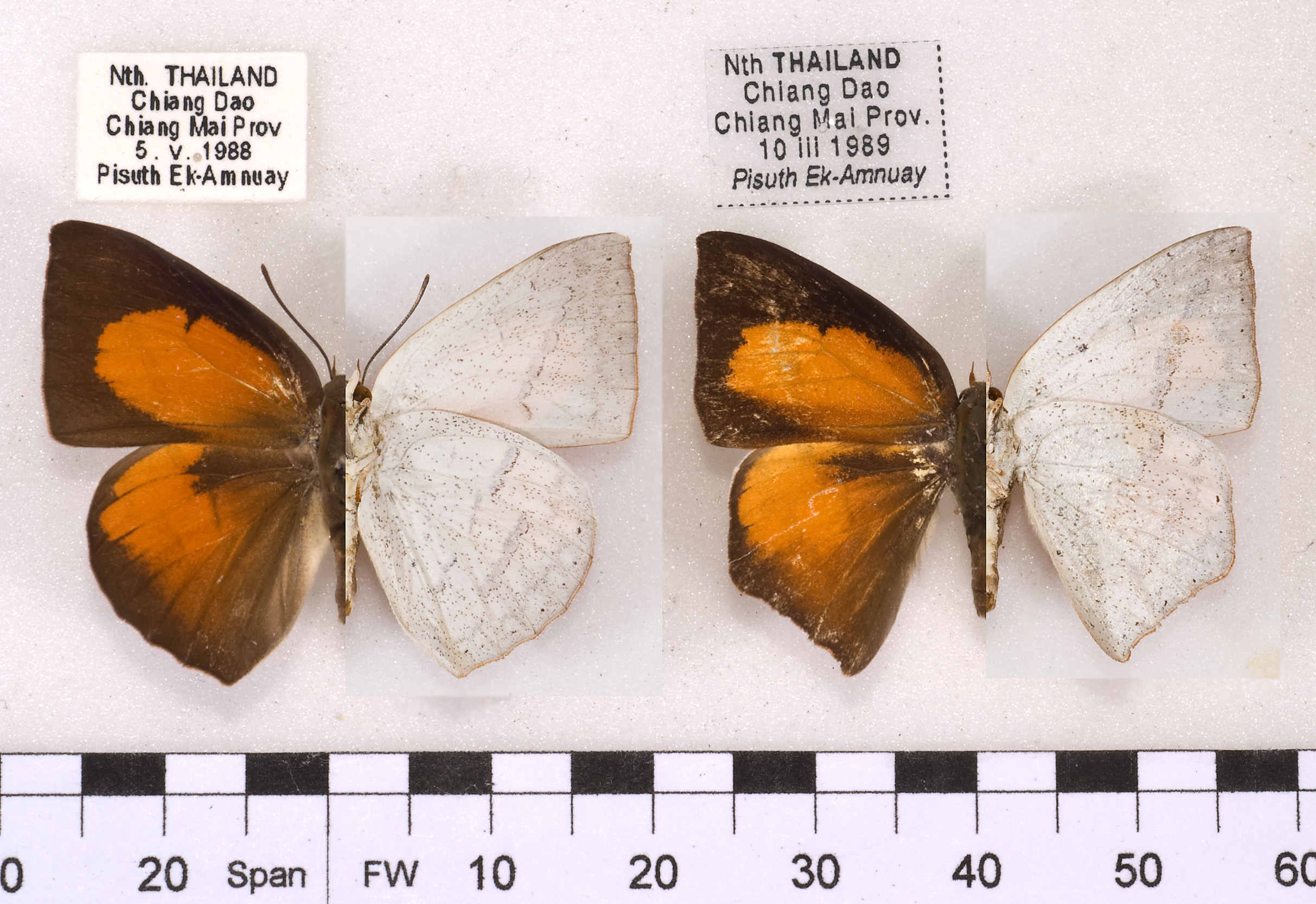
Curetis acuta dentata

Forewing with broad black margins, broadest at the apex and at the hinder angle; the inner border of the black margin almost evenly rounded, the black marginal band running inwards also on the hinder margin, narrowing rapidly basally and terminating about the middle; a black spot at the end of the cell running into the costal black band; some greenish-brown irrorations at the base of the wing; apex very acute, the outer margin being somewhat concave below it, hinder angle triangular, hinder margin nearly as long as the costa, the outer margin consequently erect, though slightly sinuous. Hindwing with greenish-brown irrorations at the base and broadly on the abdominal area; a black streak along the upperside of the sub-costal nervure from the base to the middle of the wing where it thickens; costal space narrowly, nearly white, an outer marginal black band, which commences narrowly on the costa before the apex, widens very gradually round the apex, widens suddenly at the middle and then becomes diffuse hindwards; apex and outer margin evenly rounded to the middle, then with a series of slight scallops obliquely straight to the anal angle which is much produced and acute; abdominal fold nearly white. Underside white, bands grey, more distinct, more complete and broader than in the other Indian forms. Forewing with the inner band commencing on the costa near the apex, straight down to the hinder margin beyond the middle, the other band sub-marginal. Hindwing with a grey bar across the end of the cell, a short band from the costa in continuation of the inner band of the forewing, stopping short of the discoidal bar, a post-discal straight band from the apex to near the abdominal margin above the anal angle; a sub-marginal band, and indications of a short inner band from the costa parallel to the first mentioned band; both wings sparsely irrorated with minute black atoms in fresh specimens. Cilia orange, with some white at the tips on the upper part of the hindwing.

Female. Upperside white. Forewing with the bands as in the male, the basal irrorations blackish-brown. Hindwing with the streak from the base paler and broader, with some blackish-brown suffusions and irrorations hindwards, joining the blackish-brown irrorations of the abdominal area, the outer marginal band broader than in the male, paler and more diffuse, broadening greatly downwards until it is lost in the irrorations of the abdominal area. Underside as in the male. Antennae black with pale red tips; head and body brown above, with greenish-brown hairs, white beneath.

== Distribution ==
South India. Pachhmari. Mussoories to Dawnas. Sikkim, Assam, China, Hainan, Taiwan, Japan. Possibly northern Burma and Indochina.

== Cited references ==
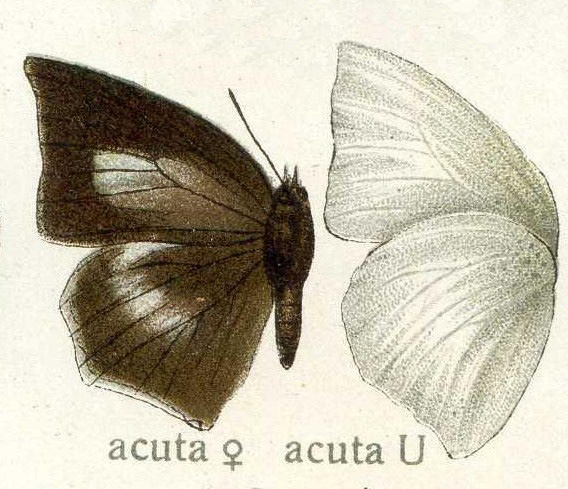
Curetis acuta from Seitz
