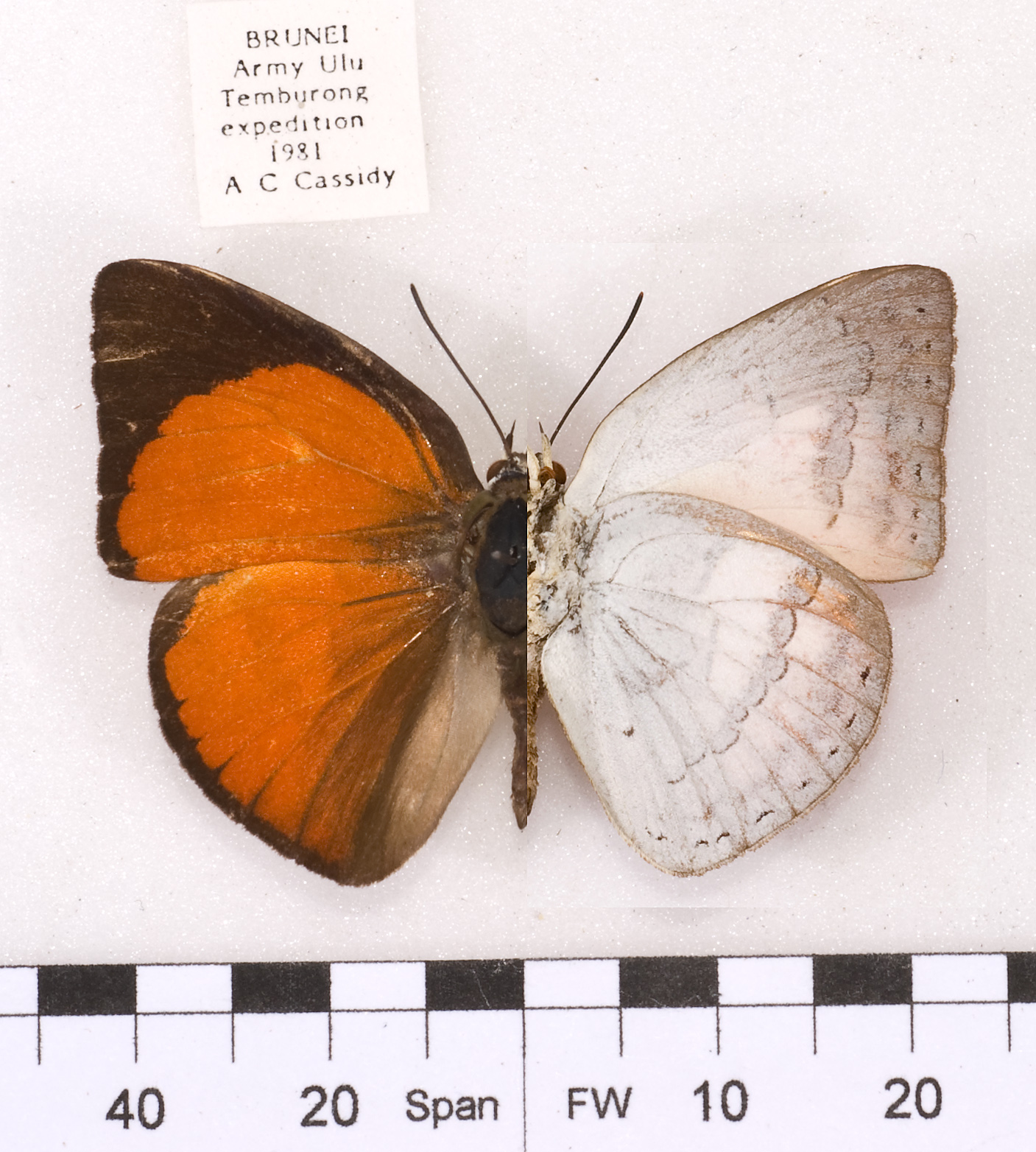

Scientific classification
- Domain: Eukaryota
- Kingdom: Animalia
- Phylum: Arthropoda
- Class: Insecta
- Order: Lepidoptera
- Family: Lycaenidae
- Genus: Curetis
- Species: C. regula

Binomial name
- Curetis regula Evans, 1954

= Curetis regula =

Species of butterfly

Curetis regula is a species of butterfly belonging to the lycaenid family. It was described by Evans in 1954. It is found in Southeast Asia (Borneo, Java, Sumatra, Peninsular Malaya, Burma and Thailand).
