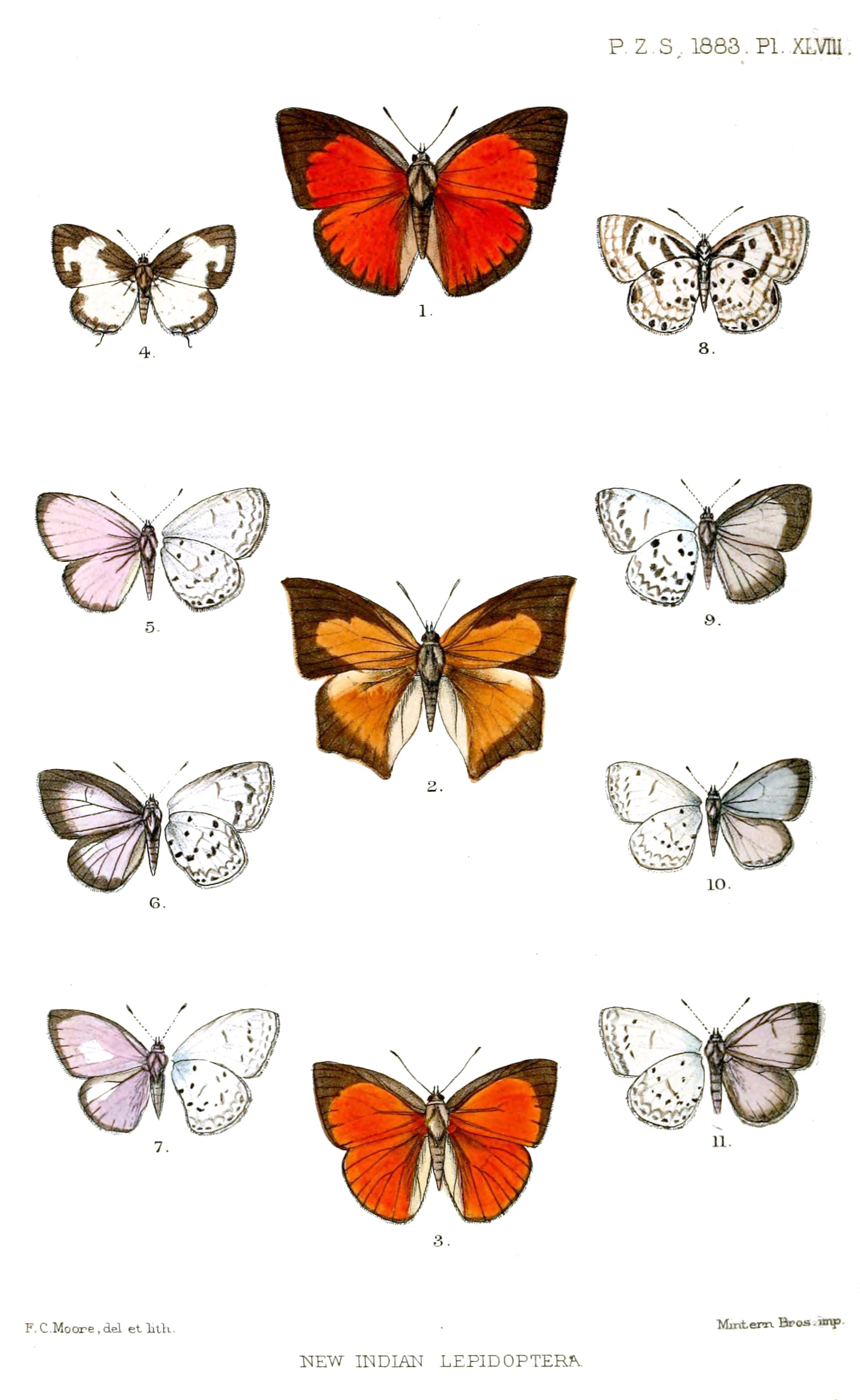
- Proceedings of the Zoological Society of London 1883, plate XLVIII fig.1
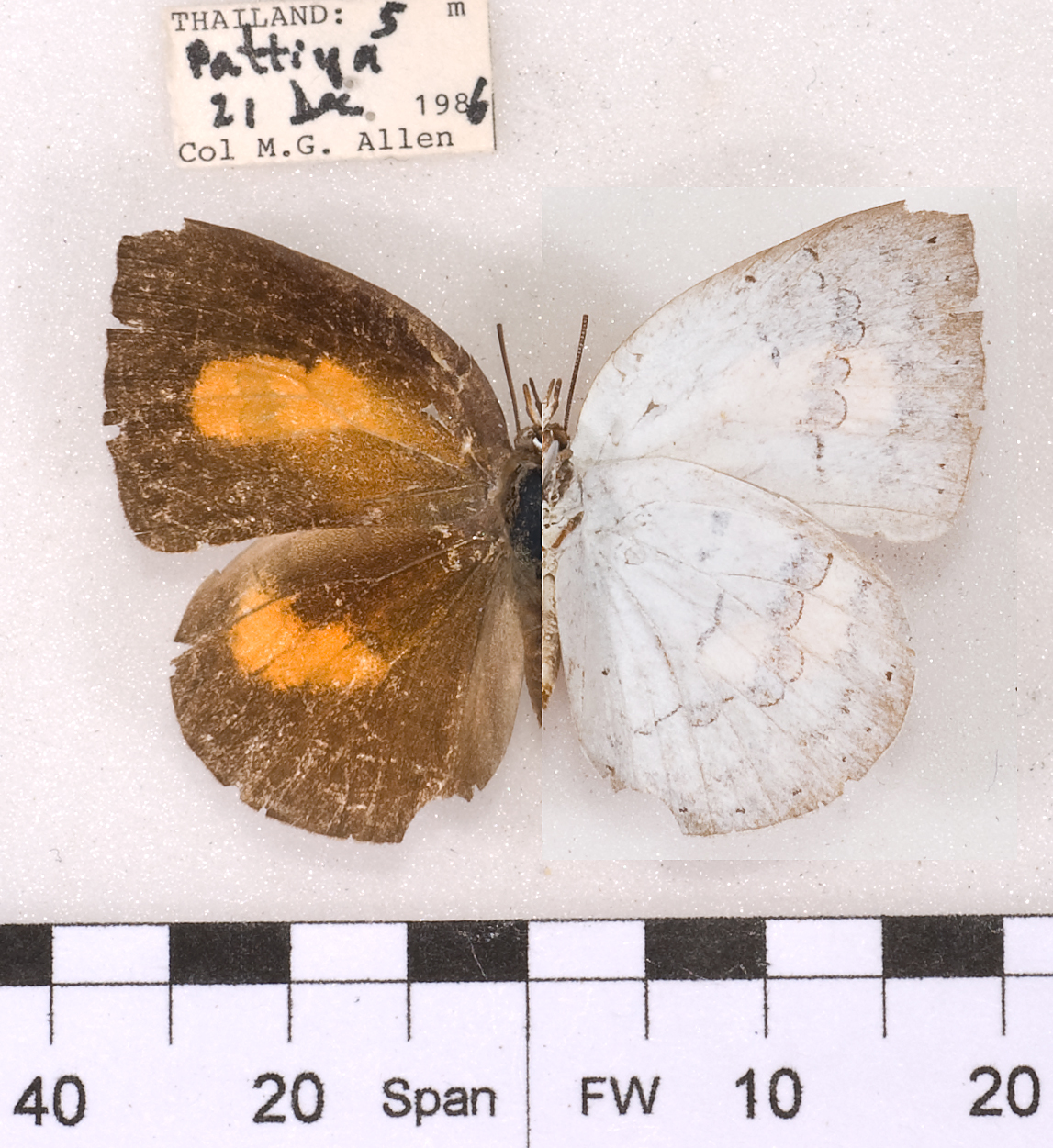
- Curetis saronis indosinica

Scientific classification
- Domain: Eukaryota
- Kingdom: Animalia
- Phylum: Arthropoda
- Class: Insecta
- Order: Lepidoptera
- Family: Lycaenidae
- Genus: Curetis
- Species: C. saronis

Binomial name
- Curetis saronis Moore, 1877

= Curetis saronis =

Burmese sunbeam

Species of butterfly

Curetis saronis, the Burmese sunbeam or Saronis sunbeam, is a species of butterfly belong to the lycaenid family. It is found in the Indomalayan realm.

== Distribution ==
Eastern India. Assam. Sylhet to Myanmar (ssp.gloriosa Moore, [1884]), Thailand (ssp. indosinica Fruhstorfer, 1908), Indochina. Sumatra (ssp. sumatrana Corbet, 1937), Singapore. Pulau Rumbia. Subspecies are described from the Nicobar Islands'

== See also ==
- Lycaenidae
- List of butterflies of India (Lycaenidae)
