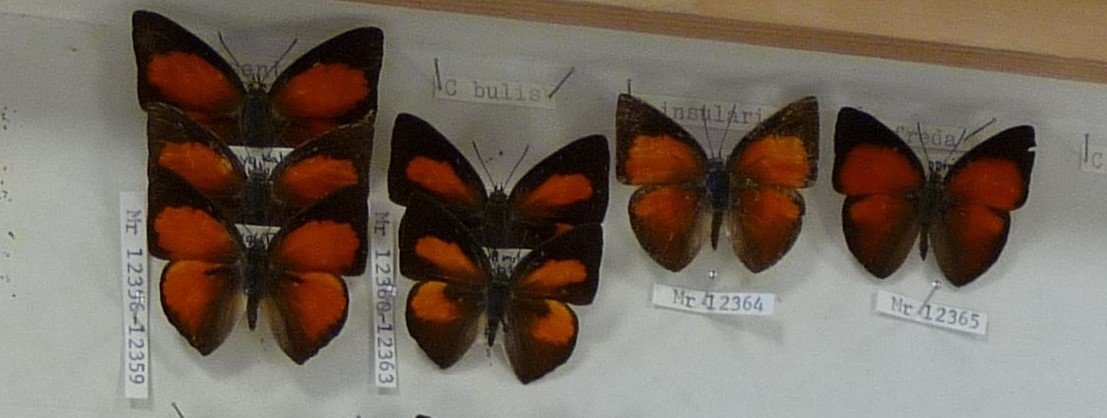

Scientific classification
- Domain: Eukaryota
- Kingdom: Animalia
- Phylum: Arthropoda
- Class: Insecta
- Order: Lepidoptera
- Family: Lycaenidae
- Genus: Curetis
- Species: C. freda

Binomial name
- Curetis freda Eliot, 1959

= Curetis freda =

Butterfly species in genus Curetis

Curetis freda, the parallel sunbeam, is a species of butterfly in the lycaenid subfamily Curetinae. It was described by John Nevill Eliot in 1959. Its type locality is the Malay Peninsula. The species also occurs on Borneo and Sumatra, and in the Yala Province of Thailand.
