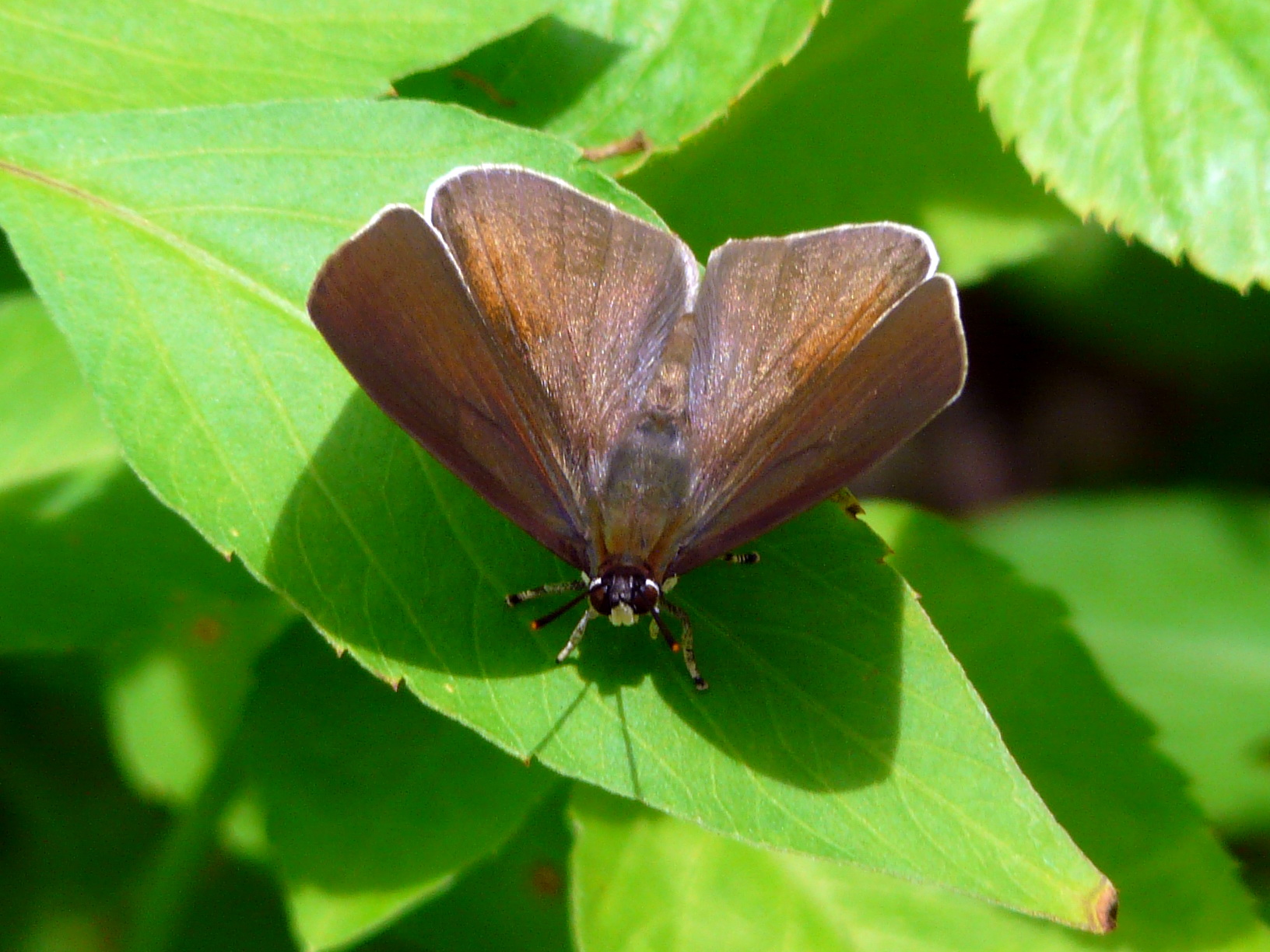

Scientific classification
- Domain: Eukaryota
- Kingdom: Animalia
- Phylum: Arthropoda
- Class: Insecta
- Order: Lepidoptera
- Family: Lycaenidae
- Genus: Curetis
- Species: C. brunnea

Binomial name
- Curetis brunnea Wileman, 1909

Synonyms
- Curetis lucifuga Fruhstorfer, 1909; Curetis acuta brunnea; Curetis acuta var. brunnea

= Curetis brunnea =

Butterfly species in genus Curetis

Curetis brunnea is a species of butterfly in the lycaenid subfamily Curetinae. It was described by Alfred Ernest Wileman in 1909 as Curetis acuta var. brunnea.

== Distribution ==
The type locality of Curetis brunnea is on Taiwan. The species is also distributed from the eastern coast of China to the Himalayas.

== Appearance ==
The species was described by Wileman as being almost entirely brown, with a faint red area that may be visible on the hindwings, and having an expanse of 46 to 48 mm.
