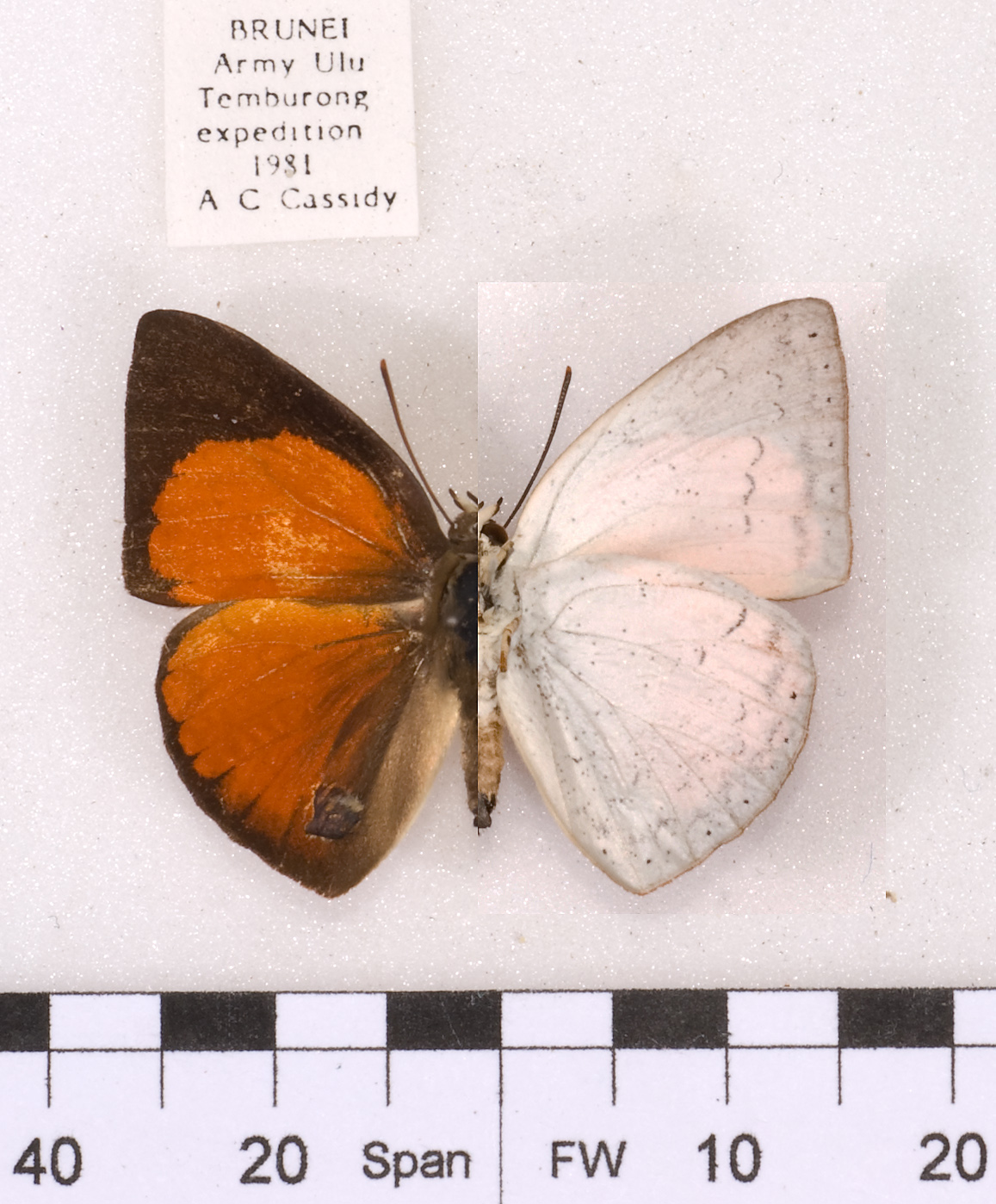
- Male, set specimen, Brunei

Scientific classification
- Domain: Eukaryota
- Kingdom: Animalia
- Phylum: Arthropoda
- Class: Insecta
- Order: Lepidoptera
- Family: Lycaenidae
- Genus: Curetis
- Species: C. felderi

Binomial name
- Curetis felderi Distant, [1884]

Synonyms
- Curetis gabrieli Corbet, 1937

= Curetis felderi =

Species of butterfly

Curetis felderi, the white-beaked sunbeam, is a species of butterfly belonging to the lycaenid family. It is found in Southeast Asia (Sumatra, Peninsular Malaya, Borneo).
