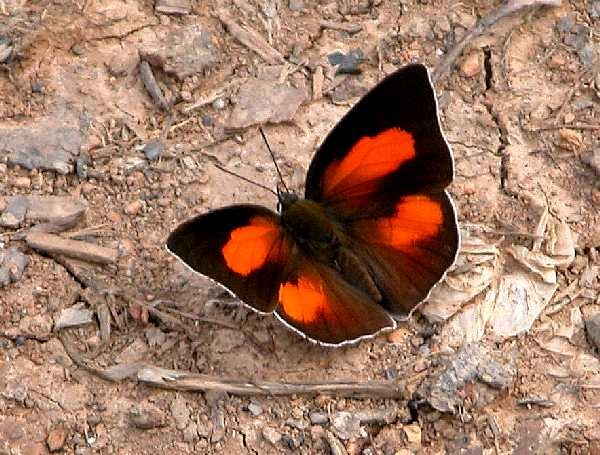

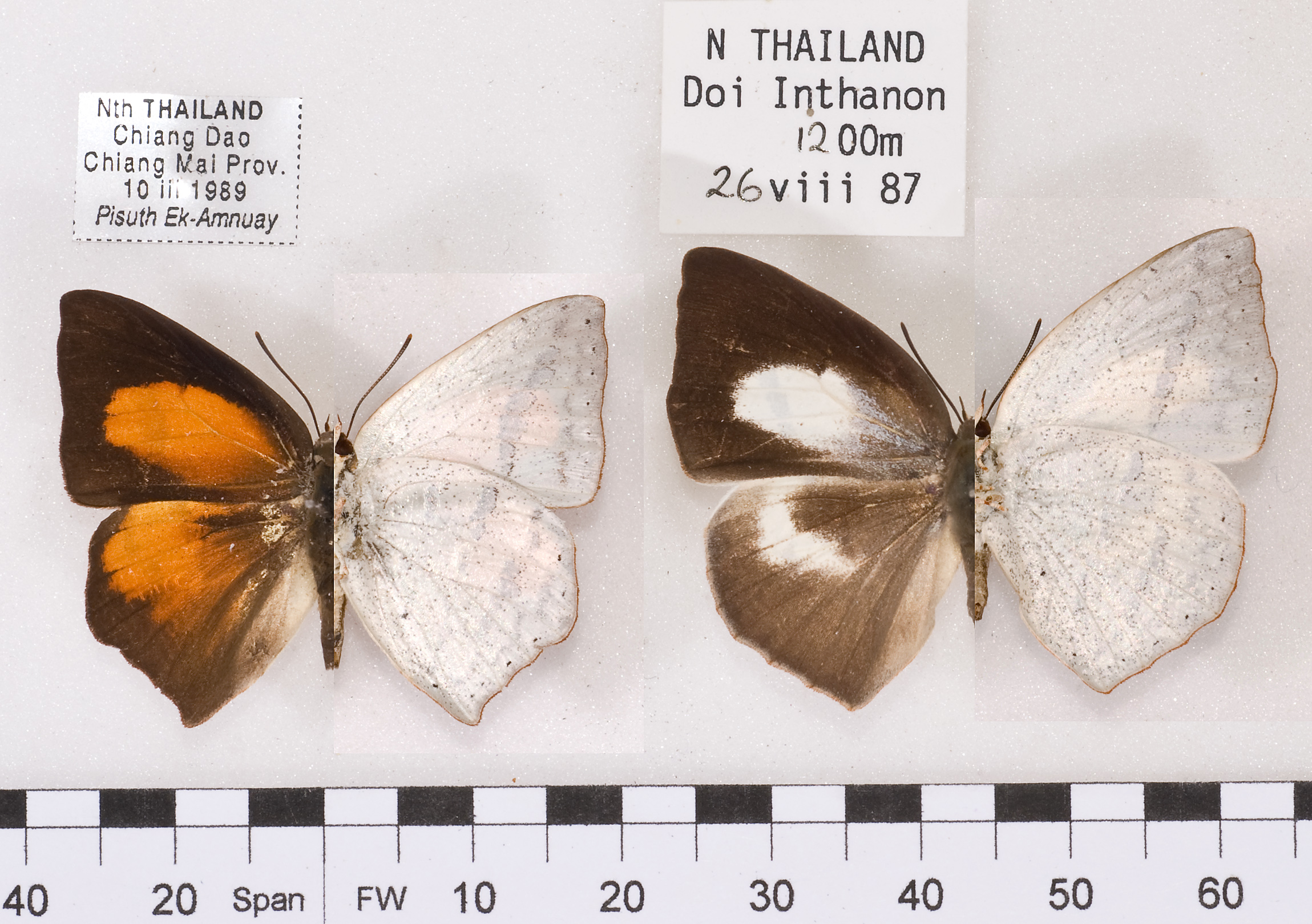

Scientific classification
- Kingdom: Animalia
- Phylum: Arthropoda
- Class: Insecta
- Order: Lepidoptera
- Family: Lycaenidae
- Genus: Curetis
- Species: C. bulis

Binomial name
- Curetis bulis Westwood, [1851]

= Curetis bulis =

Bright sunbeam

Species of butterfly

Curetis bulis, the bright sunbeam, is a species of butterfly belonging to the lycaenid family. It is found in Asia.

== Description ==
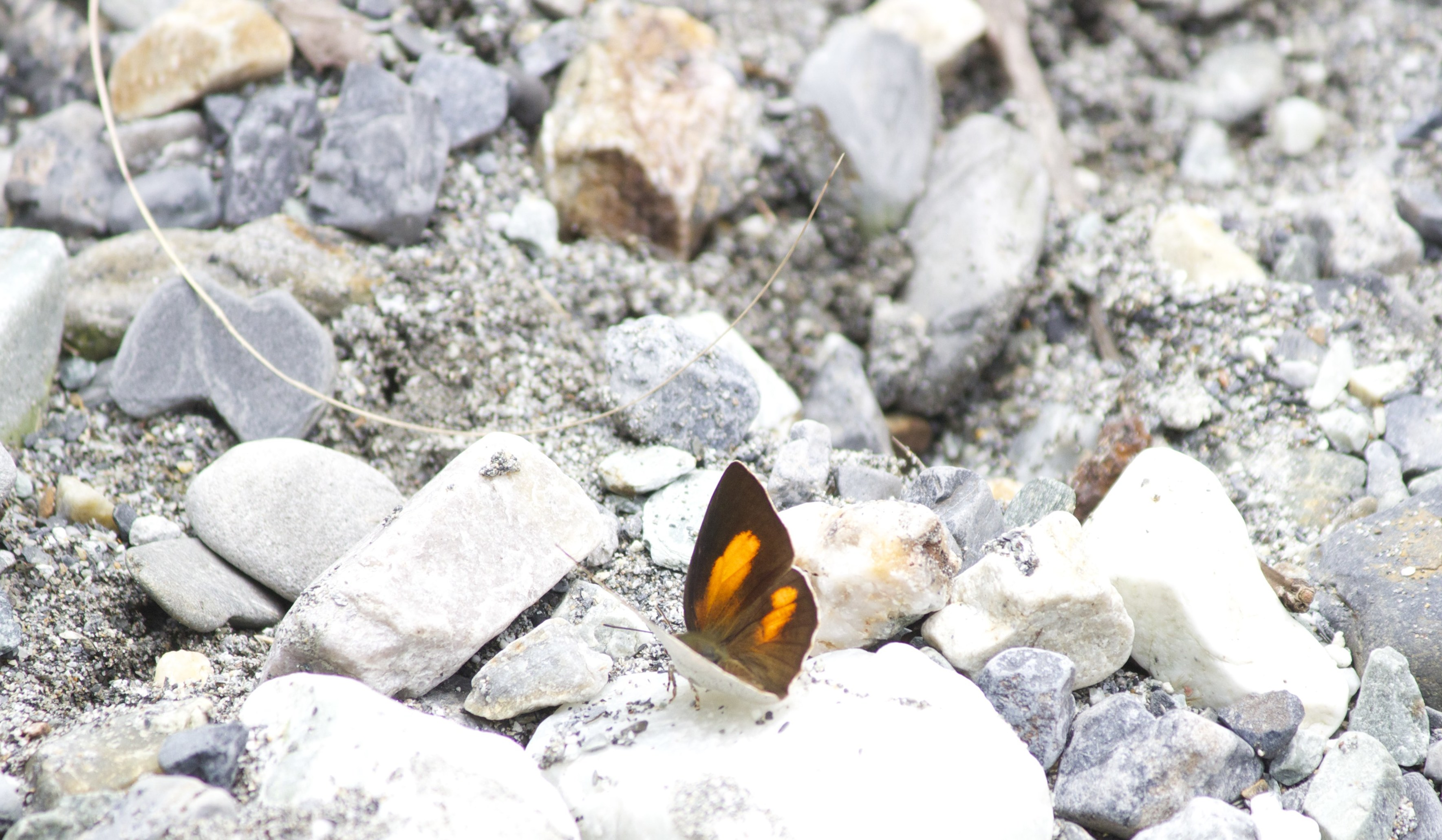
In Buxa Tiger Reserve, West Bengal, India

Male

Male upperside, forewing: velvety black, an elongate broad medial patch dark orange red, that extends from base outwards for about three-fourths the length of the wing and fills the area from vein 1 to the middle of the cell; in some specimens diffusely, spread below vein 1 near base, but there shaded with dusky black; the outer margin of this red patch unevenly rounded. Hindwing: brownish black, a large orange-red spot above vein 3 to near apex, inwardly extended into the cell to near the base of the wing and posteriorly diffuse below vein 3, but in the cell thickly overlaid with dusky-black scaling and posteriorly shaded with long brown hairs that in certain lights take a golden tint; above the cell extended from the base of the wing to the inner margin of the orange spot is a prominent broad streak of a shade darker than the ground colour; abdominal fold pale pinkish brown. Underside: silvery white with sparsely scattered minute black dots. Forewing: a discal and inner subterminal series of very indistinct somewhat lunular black markings that form broken anteriorly convergent bands, which are continued over the hindwing to the tornus; beyond these, on both forewings and hindwings, succeeds an outer subterminal series of minute black dots, in most specimens very indistinct. Antennae, head, thorax and abdomen dark brown; sides of the abdomen golden brown; beneath: palpi, thorax and abdomen white.

Female

Female upperside: more or less as in the male, but the dark orange-red medial patches replaced by white and much larger. On the forewing this white patch extends above the cell, the discocellulars closing which are prominently marked by a black tooth, and posteriorly it reaches the dorsal margin. On the hindwing the white patch is very large and in some specimens very diffuse. Both forewings and hindwings are shaded at the base by dusky scales and in many specimens the markings of the underside are plainly visible by transparency; the broad black streak above the cell on the hindwing is present in some, absent in other specimens. Underside: ground colour and markings as in the male, but much more prominent.

=== Variety dentata ===
Male

Upperside golden or coppery orange o£ a shade paler than the orange patch in the typical form. Forewing: costal margin broadly black, the width of the black colour increasing to the apex and continued from below that in an even border along the termen to the tornus, thence along the apical third of the dorsum, ending more or less diffusely in a point; discocellulars marked by a prominent tooth extended from the black costal border. Hindwing: base and dorsal area lightly irrorated (sprinkled) with fuscous scales, the latter also shaded with long pale brown hairs; termen with a blackish border of varying width but generally widest in the middle, its inner margin more or less diffuse; costal margin broadly pale yellow. Underside: silvery white; markings similar to but in some specimens even more indistinct than in bulis. Antennae, head and thorax of a paler brown than in bulis; sides of the abdomen golden yellow; beneath: palpi, thorax and abdomen white.

Female

Female upperside: similar to that of the male, but the orange replaced by white, the black costal and terminal borders on the forewing broader; on the dorsal margin the border is continued further towards the base; the discocellular black tooth-like mark as prominent as in the male. Hindwing: the white area very much smaller than the similar orange area on the hindwing of the male and confined to the apical third of the wing; a short, broad, clavate (club like), black streak extends from the base outwards above the cell. Underside as in the male but the markings more prominent.

=== Variety angulata Moore ===
Differs from bulis in the shape of the hindwing, which has the termen very strongly angulate in the middle in both sexes. In both male and female also the apex of the fore and tornal angle of the hindwing are highly acuminate, in the forewing the apex is, in most specimens, falcate (sickle shaped). Male upperside: differs from the upperside of the typical form in the greater extent and paler colour of the orange-red areas on both forewings and hindwings. On the forewing the discocellulars are marked by a black tooth as in var. dentata, and on the hindwing the orange-red ground colour extends posteriorly to vein 2, but along the dorsum it is heavily shaded with dusty-black scales. Underside: as in typical bulis. Antennae, head, thorax and abdomen black, the sides of the abdomen not reddish or golden; beneath: palpi, thorax and abdomen white. Female upper and undersides: similar to those of the male, but the ground colour on the upperside white.

=== Variety malayica Felder ===
Upperside, forewing: closely resembles that of typical bulis, but the medial orange-red area is larger and extends slightly further outwards, upwards and downwards so that the black on the tornal area forms a broad triangle and is continued along the dorsal margin, narrowing to a slender line near the base of the wing; anteriorly the black border along the costa projects as a slender black tooth along the discocellulars, which however, is absent in many specimens. Hindwing: the orange-red area that in bulis forms an upper discal patch, in this variety or form spreads inwards to the base, posteriorly towards the tornus and leaves only a comparatively narrow terminal margin; the tornal area broadly black, the inner margin of the black very diffuse, rarely so clearly defined as in Felder's figure; near the base, above the subcostal vein, there is a short, broad, black streak; abdominal fold pale greyish white. Underside: silvery white, the markings faint and ill-defined as in all forms of Curetis; the discal oblique band of the forewing carried over the hindwing, but not in any specimen that I have seen continued in even a disjointed line (as in bulis) to the tornal angle. The rest as in typical bulis. Antennae, head, thorax and abdomen similar to those of bulis.— Female Very similar to that of bulis. Differs on the upperside, in some specimens only, by the extent of the white area on the hindwing, which spreads practically over the whole wing, but is heavily shaded along the terminal margin and posteriorly on the dorsal area with dusky brownish-black or fuscous. On the underside the ground colour and markings are as in bulis. Antennae, head, thorax and abdomen similar to those of bulis.

== Life history ==
=== Larva ===
About 10 mm long. Colour velvety green; head dark brown; 3rd and 4th segments with narrow, obliquely placed lateral stripes of crimson, edged posteriorly with yellow; 6th to 11th segments with a slender longitudinal dorsal stripe of the same colour; the spiracles on each side surmounted by a slender, lunulated, pale yellow line; on the 9th segment a conspicuous quadrate patch of white between the spiracular yellow lunule and the crimson dorsal line; 12th and remaining segments dark green; on the 12th two greenish-yellow, erect, rigid processes slightly divergent at their apices; the tentacles protruded from their processes seem to be pinkish brown, with a tuft of black and white hairs at their apices; but it is not easy to note the colour of the hairs, as they are protruded, whirled round and withdrawn with great rapidity. There is no opening or honey-gland on the 11th or other segment, as in many lycaenid larvae. In shape also these do not resemble the larva of the Lycaenidae which as a rule, are onisciform. In these the head is small and almost always completely hidden under the 2nd segment; the 3rd, 4th, and 5th segments sloped upwards posteriorly, form each a well-marked transverse ridge.

=== Pupa ===
A rounded slightly convex disc with a protrusion posteriorly; colour translucent dark green. Seen under a magnifying glass they seem to be studded with tiny pits, except on the lateral areas; on the anterior portion there is an oval yellowish-white mark.

== See also ==
- List of butterflies of India (Lycaenidae)
