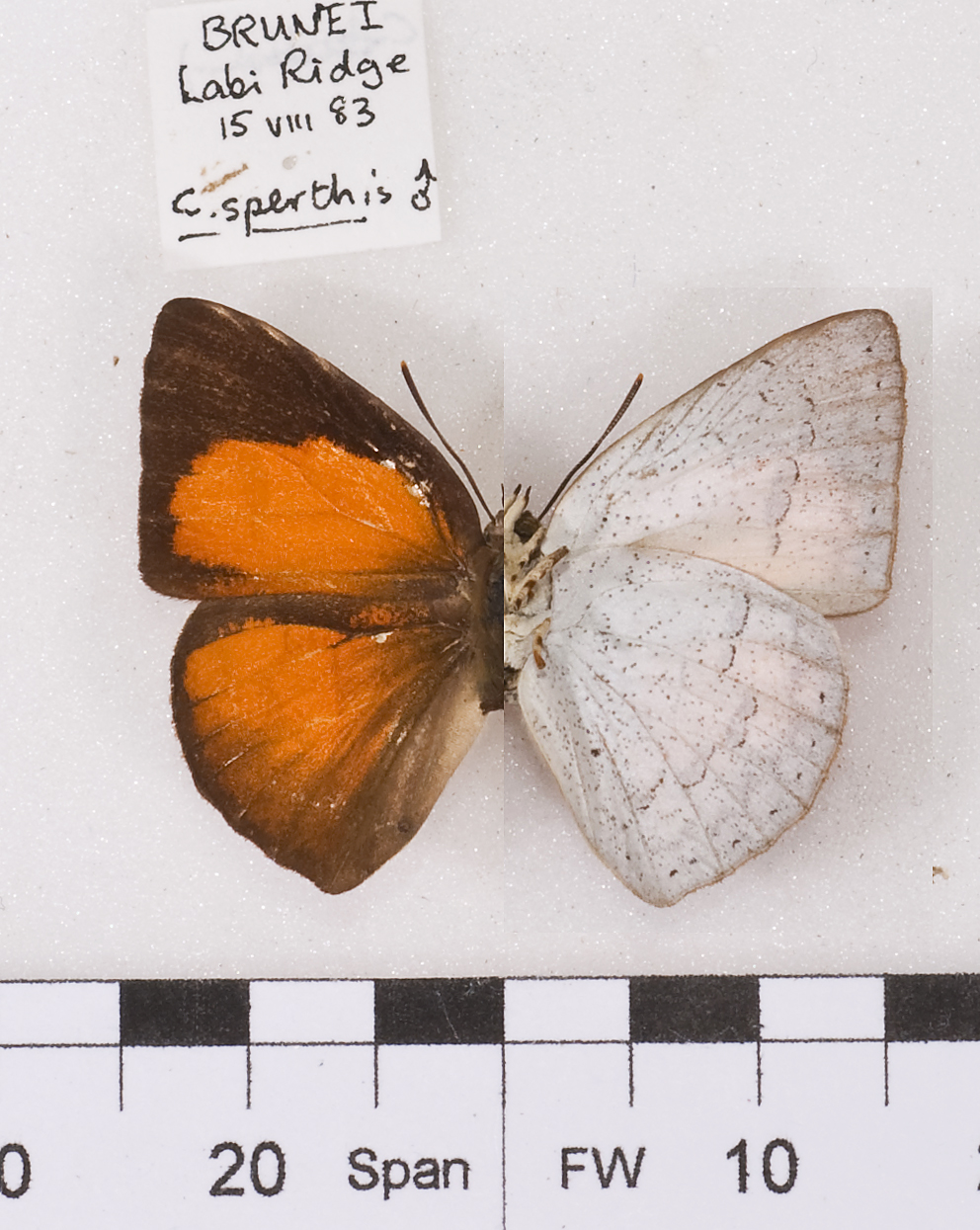
- Curetis sperthis sperthis

Scientific classification
- Domain: Eukaryota
- Kingdom: Animalia
- Phylum: Arthropoda
- Class: Insecta
- Order: Lepidoptera
- Family: Lycaenidae
- Genus: Curetis
- Species: C. sperthis

Binomial name
- Curetis sperthis C. Felder & R. Felder, 1865

Synonyms
- Anops sperthis C. & R. Felder, [1865]; Curetis minima Distant & Pryer, 1887; Curetis malayica var. kiritana Doherty, 1891; Curetis felderi niasica Fruhstorfer, 1900; Curetis sanatana sanatana f. semilimbata Fruhstorfer, 1908; Curetis sanatana sanatana f. latipicta Fruhstorfer, 1908; Curetis javana Chapman, 1915; Curetis insularis baweana Fruhstorfer, 1908; Curetis tonkina metayei Inoue & Kawazoe, 1965

= Curetis sperthis =

Species of butterfly

Curetis sperthis is a species of butterfly belonging to the lycaenid family. It is found in Southeast Asia (Burma, Thailand, Peninsular Malaya, Langkawi, Singapore, Pulau Tioman, Sumatra, Java and Borneo).

== Subspecies ==
- Curetis sperthis sperthis (southern Burma, Thailand, Peninsular Malaysia, Langkawi, Singapore, Pulau Tioman, Sumatra, Java, Borneo)
- Curetis sperthis kiritana Doherty, 1891 (Sumba, Sumbawa)
- Curetis sperthis niasica Fruhstorfer, 1900 (Nias)
- Curetis sperthis semilimbata Fruhstorfer, 1908 (Java)
- Curetis sperthis baweana Fruhstorfer, 1908 (Bawean)
- Curetis sperthis metayei Inoue & Kawazoe, 1965 (southern Vietnam)
- Curetis sperthis kawazoei Okubo, 1983 (Tioman)
