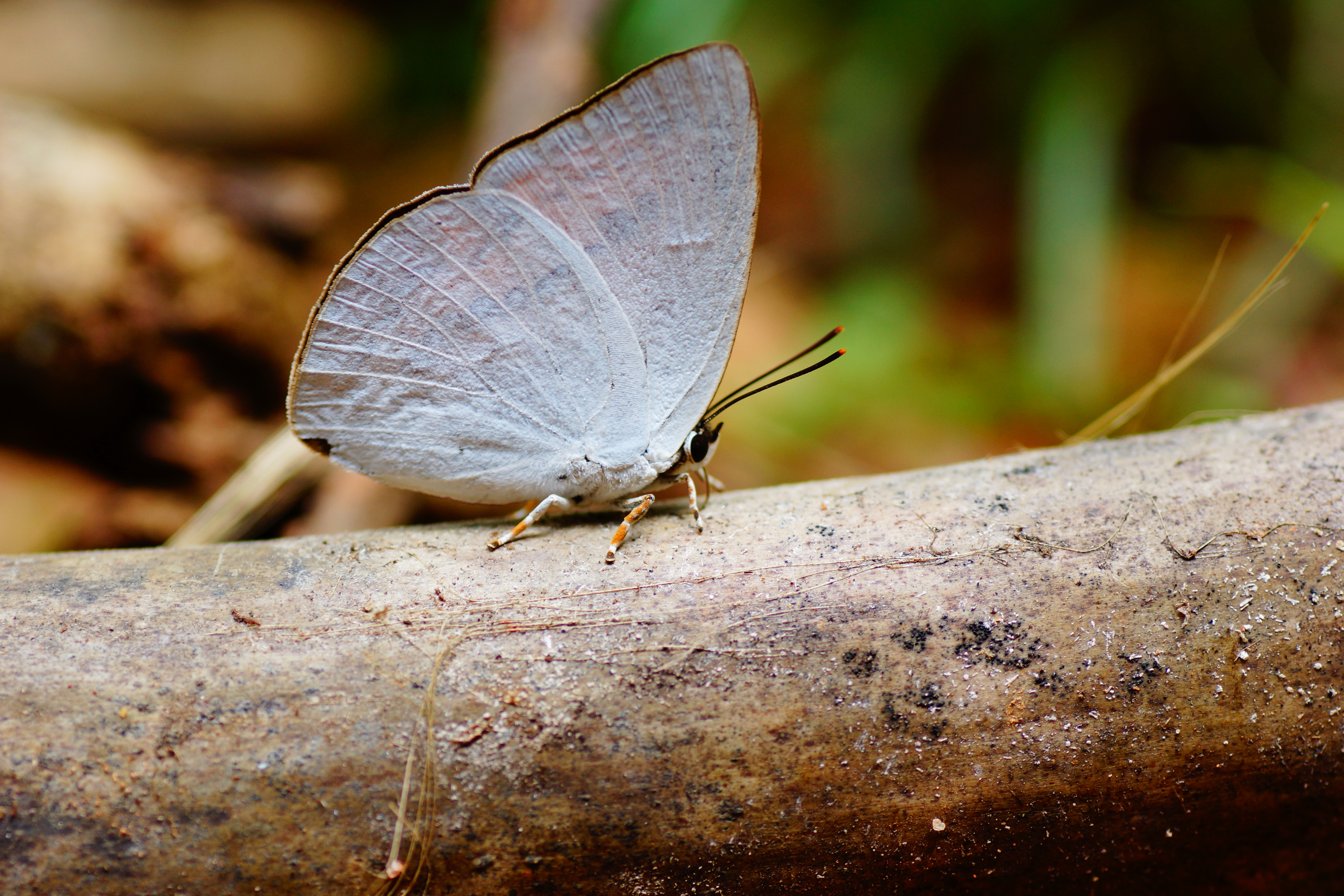

Scientific classification
- Kingdom: Animalia
- Phylum: Arthropoda
- Clade: Pancrustacea
- Class: Insecta
- Order: Lepidoptera
- Family: Lycaenidae
- Genus: Curetis
- Species: C. siva

Binomial name
- Curetis siva Evans, 1954.

= Curetis siva =

Shiva's sunbeam

Species of butterfly

Curetis siva, the Shiva sunbeam, is a species of lycaenid or blue butterfly found in Asia.

It can be distinguished by the underside hindwing stria in space 6 almost in line with stria in space 5. Female with white areas.

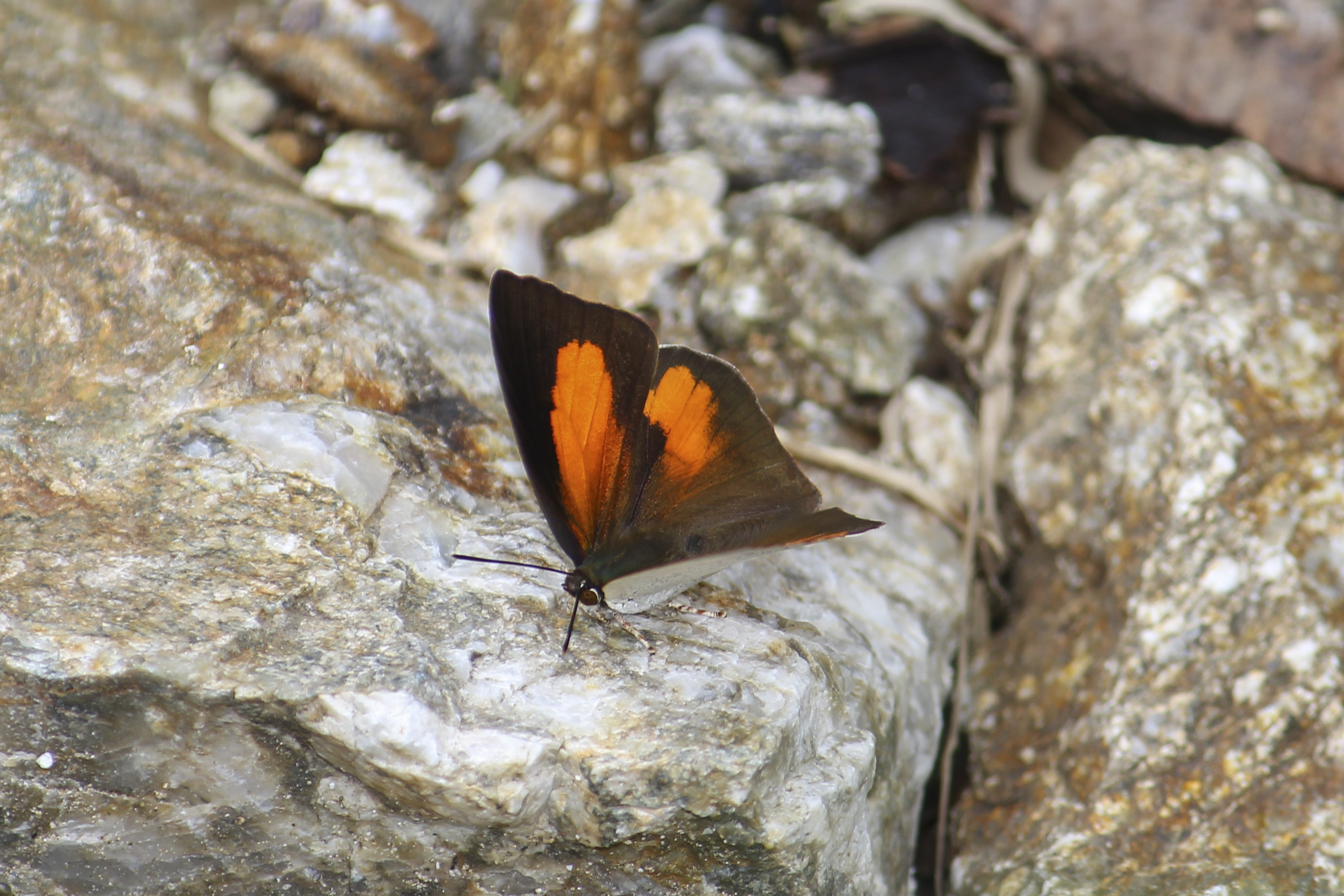
Wings partially open
