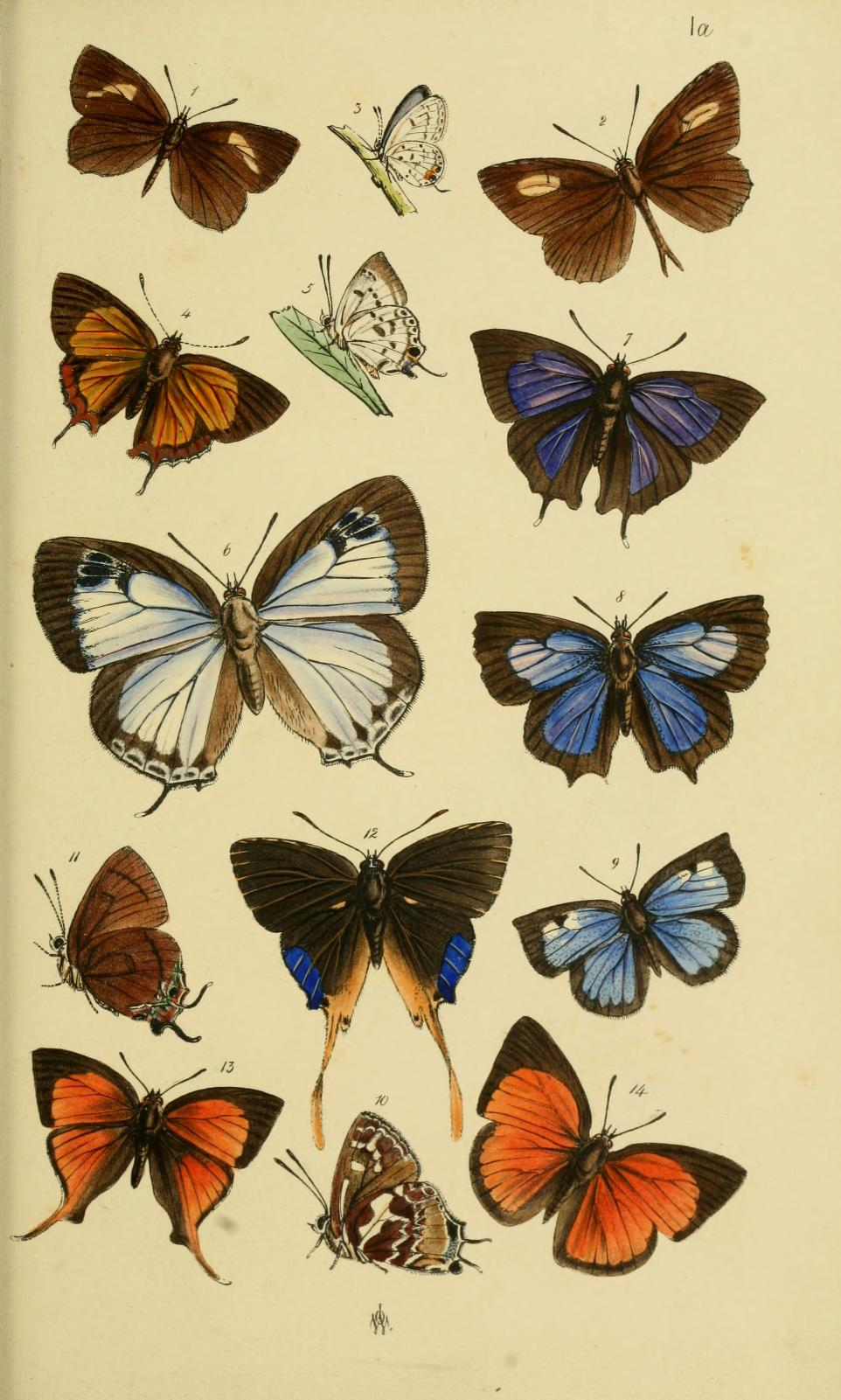
- Plate accompanying the original description. Figure 14 depicts Anops insularis a synonym for Curetis insularis

Scientific classification
- Domain: Eukaryota
- Kingdom: Animalia
- Phylum: Arthropoda
- Class: Insecta
- Order: Lepidoptera
- Family: Lycaenidae
- Genus: Curetis
- Species: C. insularis

Binomial name
- Curetis insularis (Horsfield, 1829)

= Curetis insularis =

Species of butterfly

Curetis insularis is a species of butterfly belonging to the lycaenid family. It is found in the Indomalayan realm (Java, Peninsular Malaya, Borneo, Sumatra, Thailand). Curetis insularis was described by Horsfield in 1829.
