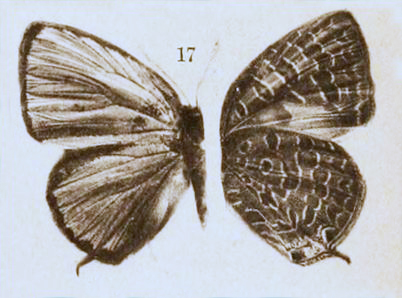
- Ideotype

Scientific classification
- Kingdom: Animalia
- Phylum: Arthropoda
- Clade: Pancrustacea
- Class: Insecta
- Order: Lepidoptera
- Family: Lycaenidae
- Genus: Arhopala
- Species: A. agesilaus

Binomial name
- Arhopala agesilaus (Staudinger, 1889)

Synonyms
- Amblypodia agesilaus Staudinger, 1889; Arhopala gesa Corbet, 1941; Narathura agesilaus philippa Evans, 1957

= Arhopala agesilaus =

Species of butterfly

Arhopala agesilaus is a species of butterfly belonging to the lycaenid family described by Otto Staudinger in 1889. It is found in Southeast Asia (Thailand, Peninsular Malaya, Langkawi, Mergui, Bangka, Borneo and the Philippines).

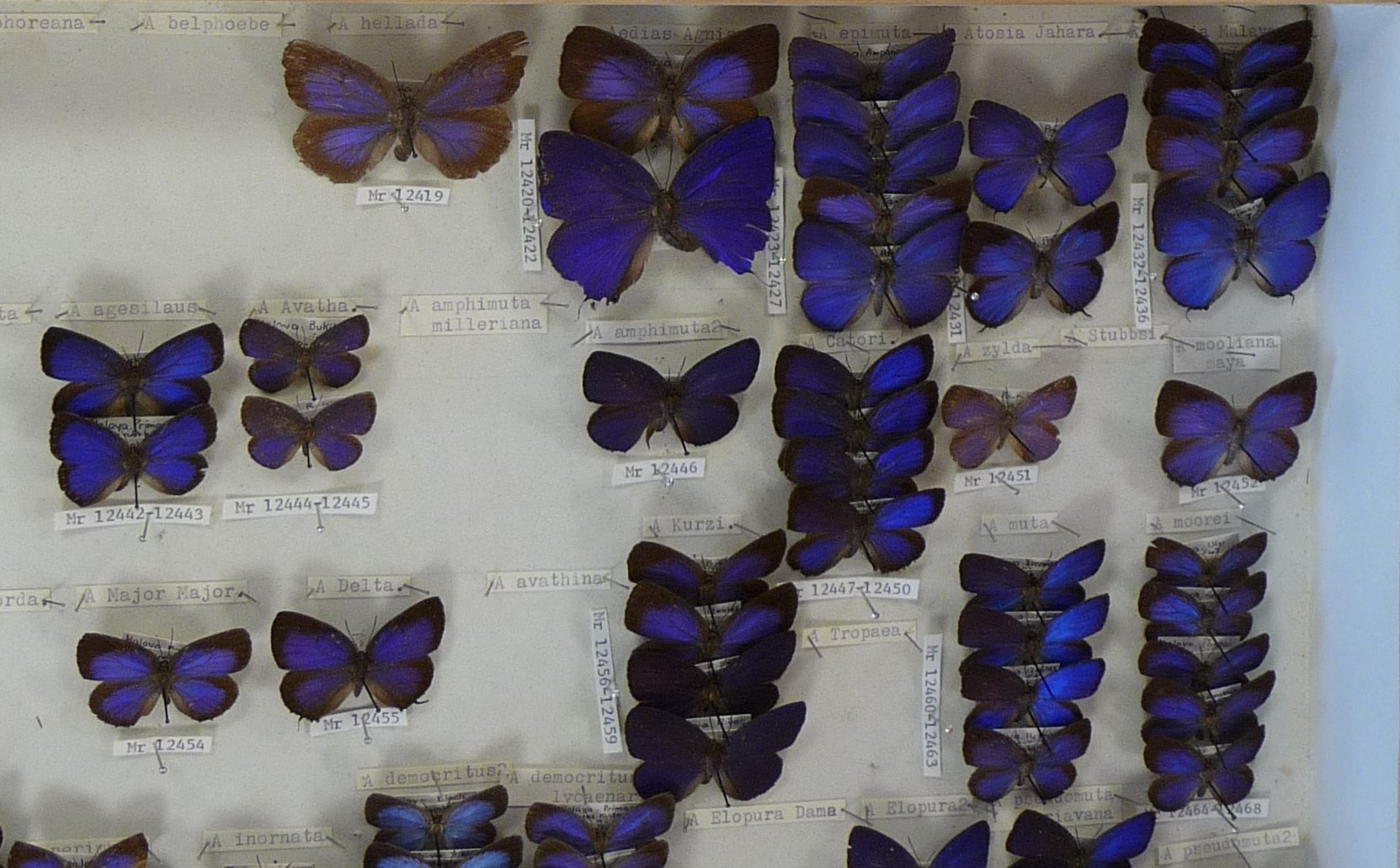
Arhopala agesilaus, kurzi and other Arhopala Malaya, Wilcocks collection

Beneath similar to Arhopala kurzi, but of a somewhat lighter ground-colour, with a more coherent postmedian band of the hindwing. Above distinguished by the much broader black margin also in the male, where it is about 3 mm broad.

== Subspecies ==
- Arhopala agesilaus agesilaus (Borneo)
- Arhopala agesilaus gesa Corbet, 1941 (Thailand, Peninsular Malaysia, Langkawi, Mergui, Bangka)
- Arhopala agesilaus philippa (Evans, 1957) (Mindanao, Mindoro)
