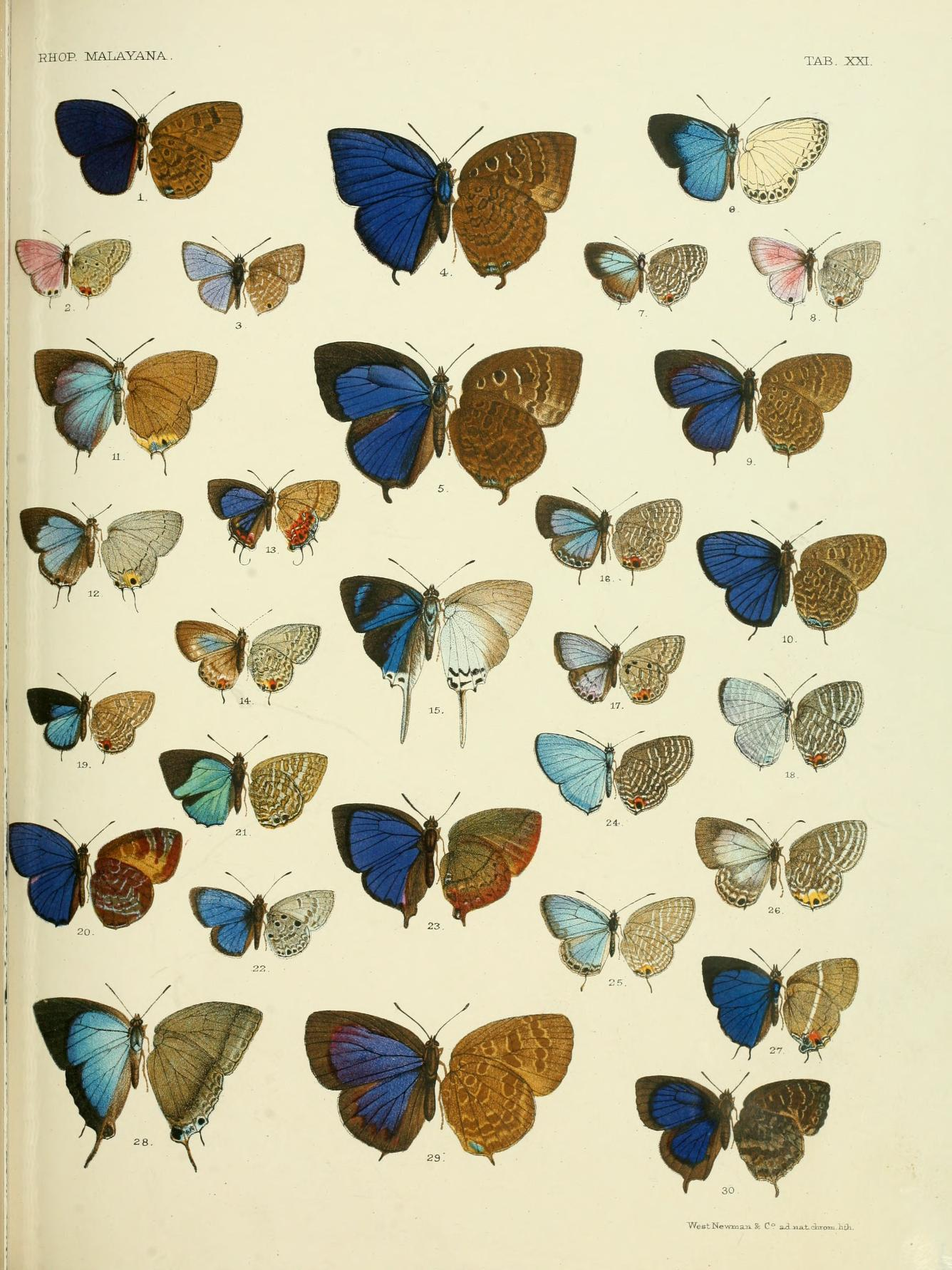
- Arhopala kurzi in Rhopalocera Malayana

Scientific classification
- Kingdom: Animalia
- Phylum: Arthropoda
- Clade: Pancrustacea
- Class: Insecta
- Order: Lepidoptera
- Family: Lycaenidae
- Genus: Arhopala
- Species: A. kurzi

Binomial name
- Arhopala kurzi (Distant 1885).

= Arhopala kurzi =

Species of butterfly

Arhopala kurzi is a butterfly in the family Lycaenidae. It was described by William Lucas Distant in 1885. It is found in the Indomalayan realm (Peninsular Malaya).

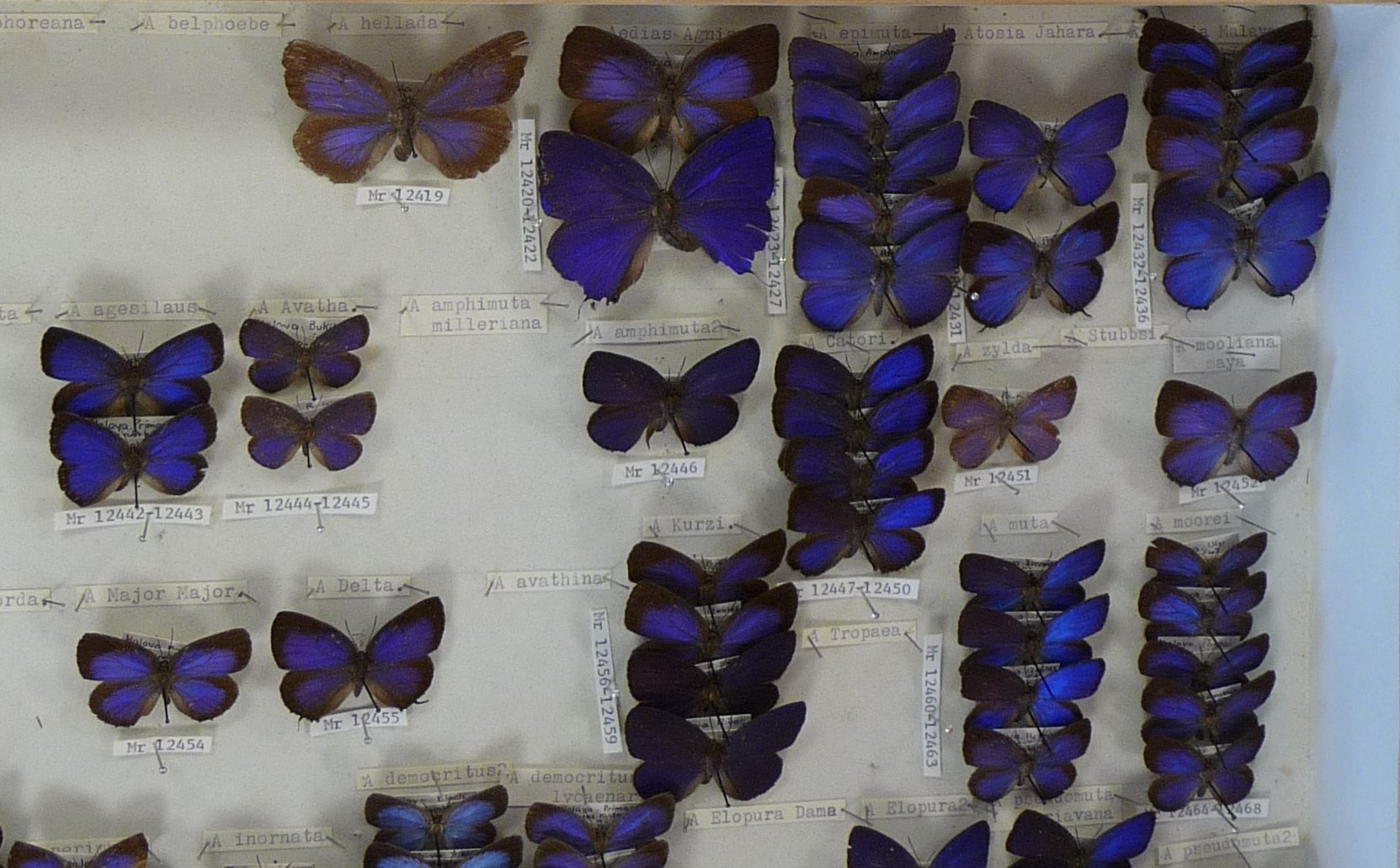
kurzi and other Arhopala Malaya, Wilcocks collection

A. kurzi above entirely resembles a small Arhopala inornata and likewise exhibits the marking in the marginal area of the forewing beneath almost entirely extinct, but the colouring of the under surface is much darker, of a deep bark-coloured brown.
