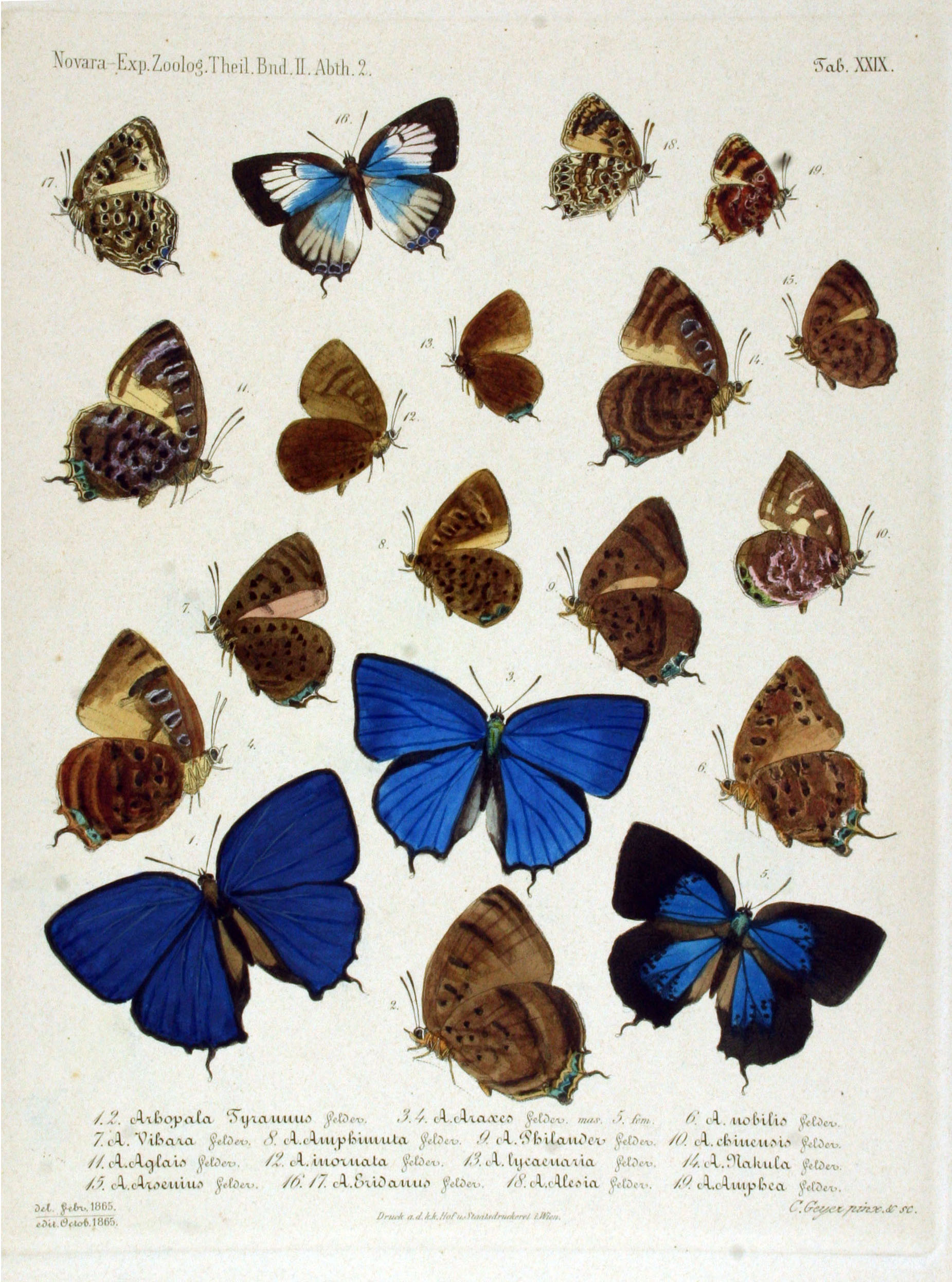
- Arhopala inornata in Felder and Felder Reise der Österreichischen Fregatte Novara

Scientific classification
- Kingdom: Animalia
- Phylum: Arthropoda
- Clade: Pancrustacea
- Class: Insecta
- Order: Lepidoptera
- Family: Lycaenidae
- Genus: Arhopala
- Species: A. inornata

Binomial name
- Arhopala inornata (C. &.R. Felder, 1860)

= Arhopala inornata =

Species of butterfly

Arhopala inornata is a butterfly in the family Lycaenidae. It was described by Cajetan Felder and Rudolf Felder in 1860. It is found in the Indomalayan realm.

In males the upperside of both wings is rather bright violet-purple. The forewings have a linear brown costa and outer margin. The hindwings have a broadish brown costa and linear outer margin. On the underside both wings are greyish brown, with slightly darker markings palely encircled. In females the upperside of both wings is pale violet, with a broad brown costa and outer margins increasing towards the apex, which is largely brown in the forewings.

== Subspecies ==
- A. i. inornata Peninsular Malaya, Thailand, Sumatra
- A. i. empesta Corbet, 1941 Borneo
