= Ideotype =

In systematics, an ideotype is a specimen identified as belonging to a specific taxon by the author of that taxon, but collected from somewhere other than the type locality.

The concept of ideotype in plant breeding was introduced by Donald in 1968 to describe the idealized appearance of a plant variety. It literally means 'a form denoting an idea'. According to Donald, an ideotype is a biological model which is expected to perform or behave in a particular manner within a defined environment: "a crop ideotype is a plant model, which is expected to yield a greater quantity or quality of grain, oil or other useful product when developed as a cultivar." In 1976, Donald and Hamblin proposed the concepts of isolation, competition and crop ideotypes. Market ideotype, climatic ideotype, edaphic ideotype, stress ideotype and disease/pest ideotypes are its other concepts. The term ideotype is interchangeable with the terms model plant type, ideal model plant type, and ideal plan type.
