= List of butterflies of Laos =

This is a list of the butterflies of Laos.

== Families ==
- Papilionidae—swallowtail butterflies
- Pieridae—yellow-white butterflies
- Nymphalidae—brush-footed butterflies
- Lycaenidae—blues, hairstreaks and gossamer-winged butterflies
- Riodinidae—metalmark butterflies
- Hesperiidae—skipper butterflies

== Family Papilionidae ==
=== Subfamily Parnassiinae ===
- Bhutan glory (Bhutanitis lidderdalii)

=== Subfamily Papilioninae ===
- Brown gorgon (Meandrusa sciron)
- Yellow gorgon (Meandrusa payeni)
- Kaiser-i-Hind (Teinopalpus imperialis)
- Glassy bluebottle (Graphium cloanthus)
- Common bluebottle (Graphium sarpedon)
- Common jay (Graphium doson)
- Lesser jay (Graphium evemon)
- Great jay (Graphium eurypylus)
- Veined jay (Graphium eurypylus)
- Veined jay (Graphium chironides)
- Tailed jay (Graphium agamemnon)
- Spotted jay (Graphium arycles)
- Fourbar swordtail (Graphium agetes)
- Spot swordtail (Graphium nomius)
- Five-bar swordtail (Graphium antiphates)
- Laos swordtail (Graphium phidias)
- Lesser zebra (Graphium macareus)
- Great zebra (Graphium xenocles)
- Spotted zebra (Graphium megarus)
- Yellow spotted swordtail (Graphium mullah)
- White dragontail (Lamproptera curius)
- Green dragontail (Lamproptera meges)
- Tawny mime (Papilio agestor)
- Lesser mime (Papilio epycides)
- Blue striped mime (Papilio slateri)
- Common mime (Papilio clytia)
- Great blue mime (Papilio paradoxa)
- Lime butterfly (Papilio demoleus)
- Common yellow swallowtail (Papilio machaon)
- Banded swallowtail (Papilio demolion)
- Noble swallowtail (Papilio noblei)
- Common raven (Papilio castor)
- Yellow Hellen (Papilio nephelus)
- Red Hellen (Papilio helenus)
- Common Mormon (Papilio polytes)
- Great Mormon (Papilio memnon)
- Tailed redbreast (Papilio bootes)
- Spangle (Papilio protenor)
- Paris peacock (Papilio paris)
- Common peacock (Papilio polyctor)
- Common batwing (Atrophaneura varuna)
- Lesser batwing (Atrophaneura aidoneus)
- Black windmill (Atrophaneura crassipes)
- Common clubtail (Losaria coon)
- Lao windmill (Byasa laos)
- Adamson's rose (Byasa adamsoni)
- Common windmill (Byasa polyeuctes)
- Common birdwing (Troides helena)
- Golden birdwing (Troides aeacus)
- Common rose (Pachliopta aristolochiae)

== Family Pieridae ==
=== Subfamily: Coliadinae ===
- Orange emigrant (Catopsilia scylla)
- Mottled emigrant (Catopsilia pyranthe)
- Common emigrant (Catopsilia pomona)
- Tailed sulphur (Dercas verhuelli)
- Tree yellow (Gandaca harina)
- Common grass yellow (Eurema hecabe)
- Three-spot grass yellow (Eurema blanda)
- Scarce changeable grass yellow (Eurema simulatrix sarinoides) (Fruhstorfer, 1910)
- Chocolate grass yellow (Eurema sari) (Moore, 1886)
- Anderson's grass yellow (Eurema andersoni sadanobui) (Shirôzu & Yata, 1982)

=== Subfamily: Pierinae ===
- Psyche (Leptosia nina) (Fabricius, 1793)
- Vietnam Jezebel (Delias vietnamensis) (Monastyrskii & Devyatkin, 2000)
- White-streaked Jezebel (Delias lativitta tai) (Yoshino, 1999)
- Pale Jezebel (Delias sanaca) (Moore, 1857)
- Redspot Jezebel (Delias descombesi) (Boisduval, 1836)
- Painted Jezebel (Delias hyparete) (Linnaeus, 1758)
- Common gull (Cepora nerissa) (Fabricius, 1775)
- Lesser gull (Cepora nadina) (Lucas, 1852)
- Spotted sawtooth (Prioneris thestylis) (Doubleday, 1842)
- Eastern striped albatross (Appias olferna) (Swinhoe, 1890)
- Chocolate albatross (Appias lyncida) (Cramer, 1779)
- Orange albatross (Appias nero) (Butler, 1867)
- Indian orange albatross (Appias galba) (Wallace, 1867)
- Common albatross (Appias albina) (Boisduval, 1836)
- Plain puffin (Appias indra) (Moore, 1858)
- Large cabbage white (Pieris brassicae) (Gray, 1846)
- Small cabbage white (Pieris rapae) (Boisduval, 1836)
- Green veined white (Artogeia erutae) (Verity, 1911)
- Yellow orange tip (Ixias pyrene) (Linnaeus, 1764)
- Great orange tip (Hebomoia glaucippe) (Linnaeus, 1758)
- Pale wanderer (Pareronia avatar) (Moore, 1858)
- Common wanderer (Pareronia valeria) (Butler, 1879)

== Family Lycaenidae ==
=== Subfamily: Poritiinae ===
- Common gem (Poritia hewitsoni ampsaga) (Fruhstorfer, 1912)

=== Subfamily: Curetinae ===
- Bright sunbeam (Curetis bulis) (Westwood, 1851)
- Tonkin sunbeam (Curetis tonkina) (Evans, 1954)

=== Subfamily: Lycaeninae ===
- Purple sapphire (Heliophorus epicles latilimbata) (Fruhstorfer, 1908)

=== Subfamily: Miletinae ===
- Siam brownie (Miletus archilochus siamensis) (Godfrey, 1916)
- Mallus brownie (Miletus mallus mallus) (Fruhstorfer, 1913)
- Corbet's darkie (Allotinus corbeti) (Eliot, 1956)
- Crenulate darkie (Allotinus drumila) (Moore, 1865)
- Blue darkie (Allotinus subviolaceus subviolaceus) Felder & Felder, [1865]
- Moore's darkie (Allotinus substrigosus substrigosus) (Moore, 1884)
- Lesser darkie (Allotinus unicolor rekkia) Riley & Godfrey, 1921
- Dark mottle (Logania distanti massalia) Doherty, 1891
- Pale mottle (Logania marmorata marmorata) Moore, 1884
- Watson's mottle (Logania watsoniana) de Niceville, 1898
- Apefly (Spalgis epeus epeus) (Moore, 1878)

=== Subfamily: Polyommatinae ===
- Common Pierrot (Castalius rosimon rosimon) (Fabricius, 1775)
- Spotted Pierrot (Tarucus callinara) Butler, 1886
- Pea blue (Lampides boeticus) (Linnaeus, 1767)
- Straight Pierrot (Caleta roxus roxana) (de Niceville, 1897)
- Elbowed Pierrot (Caleta elna noliteia) (Fruhstorfer, 1918)
- Angled Pierrot (Caleta decidia decidia) (Hewitson, [1876])
- Banded blue Pierrot (Discolampa ethion ethion) (Westwood, [1851])
- Short-tailed blue (Everes argiades diporides) Chapman, 1909
- Indian Cupid (Everes lacturnus lacturnus) (Godart, [1824])
- Dusky blue Cupid (Everes huegelii dipora) Moore, 1865)
- Prized hedge blue (Udara dilecta dilecta) (Moore, 1879)
- Howarth's hedge blue (Udara placidula howarthi) (Cantlie & Norman, 1960)
- White hedge blue (Udara akasa sadanobui) Eliot & Kawazoe, 1983
- Bicolored hedge blue (Udara selma cerima) (Corbet, 1937)
- Albocerulean (Udara albocaerulea albocaerulea) (Moore, 1879)
- Common hedge blue (Acytolepis puspa gisca) (Fruhstorfer, 1910)
- Hampson's hedge blue (Acytolepis lilacea indochinensis) Eliot & Kawazoe, 1983
- Margined hedge blue (Celatoxia marginata marginata) (de Niceville, [1884])
- Plain hedge blue (Celastrina lavendularis limbata) (Moore, 1879)
- Metallic hedge blue (Callenya melaena melaena) (Doherty, 1899)
- Swinhoe's hedge blue (Monodontides musina pelides) (Fruhstorfer, 1910)
- Lesser grass blue (Zizina otis sangra) (Moore, [1866])
- Pale grass blue (Zizeeria maha maha) (Kollar, [1844])
- Dark grass blue (Zizeeria karsandra) (Moore, 1865)
- Tiny grass blue (Zizula hylax hylax) (Fabricius, 1775)
- Black spotted grass blue (Famegana alsulus eggletoni) (Corbet, 1941)
- Oriental grass jewel (Chilades putli) (Kollar, [1844])
- Lime blue (Chilades lajus lajus) (Stoll, [1780])
- Plains Cupid (Luthrodes pandava pandava) (Horsfield, [1829])
- Gram blue (Euchrysops cnejus) (Fabricius, 1798)
- Forget-me-not (Catochrysops strabo strabo) (Fabricius, 1793)
- Zebra blue (Leptotes plinius) (Fabricius, 1793)
- Dark cerulean (Jamides bochus bochus) (Stoll, [1782])
- Common cerulean (Jamides celeno celeno (Cramer, [1775])
- White cerulean (Jamides pura pura) (Moore, 1886)
- Glistering cerulean (Jamides elpis pseudelpis) (Butler, [1879])
- Royal cerulean (Jamides caeruleus caeruleus) (H. Druce, 1873)
- Metallic cerulean (Jamides alecto alocina) Swinhoe, 1915
- White line blue (Nacaduba angusta albida) Riley & Godfrey, 1925
- Rounded six-line blue (Nacaduba berenice aphya) Fruhstorfer, 1916
- Opaque six-line blue (Nacaduba beroe gythion) Fruhstorfer, 1916
- Transparent six-line blue (Nacaduba kurava euplea) Fruhstorfer, 1916
- Large four-line blue (Nacaduba pactolus continentalis) Fruhstorfer, 1916
- Violet four-line blue (Nacaduba subperusia lysa) Fruhstorfer, 1916
- Jewel four-line blue (Nacaduba sanaya naevia) Toxopeus, 1929
- Pointed lineblue (Ionolyce helicon merguiana) (Moore, 1884)
- Banded lineblue (Prosotas aluta coelestis) (Wood-Mason & de Niceville, [1887])
- Bhutya lineblue (Prosotas bhutea bhutea) (de Niceville, [1884])
- Tailess lineblue (Prosotas dubiosa indica) (Evans, 1925)
- Dark-based lineblue (Prosotas gracilis ni) (de Niceville, 1902)
- Brown lineblue (Prosotas lutea sivoka) (Evans, 1910)
- Common lineblue (Prosotas nora ardates) (Moore, [1875])
- White-tipped lineblue (Prosotas noreia hampsoni) (de Niceville, 1885)
- Margined lineblue (Prosotas pia marginata) Tite, 1963
- Dingy lineblue (Petrelaea dana) (de Niceville, [1884])
- Una (Una usta usta) (Distant, 1886)
- Chinese straight-wing blue (Orthomiella rantaizana rovorea) (Fruhstorfer, 1918)
- Straight-wing blue (Orthomiella pontis fukienensis) Forster, 1941
- White-banded Pierrot (Niphanda asialis) (de Niceville, 1895)
- Pointed Pierrot (Niphanda cymbia cymbia) de Niceville, [1884]
- Large pointed Pierrot (Niphanda tessellata tessellata) Moore, [1875]
- Ciliate blue (Anthene emolus emolus) (Godart, [1824])
- White ciliate blue (Anthene licates dusuntua) Corbet, 1940
- Pointed ciliate blue (Anthene lycaenina lycambes) (Hewitson, [1878])

=== Subfamily: Theclinae ===
- Evan's silverline (Cigaritis evansii ayuthia) (Murayama & Kimura, 1990)
- Pale-banded silverline (Cigaritis learmondi) (Tytler, 1940)
- Aroon's silverline (Cigaritis leechi arooni) (Murayama & Kimura, 1990)
- Long-banded silverline (Cigaritis lohita himalayanus) (Moore, 1884)
- Karen silverline (Cigaritis maximus) (Elwes, [1893])
- Laos silverline (Cigaritis miyamotoi) Saito & Seki, 2008
- Silver-red silverline (Cigaritis rukma) (de Niceville, [1889])
- Fruhstorfer's silverline (Cigaritis seliga) (Fruhstorfer, [1912])
- Club silverline (Cigaritis syama peguanus) (Moore, 1884)
- Aberrant silverline (Cigaritis vixinga davidsoni) (Talbot, 1936)
- Common silverline (Cigaritis vulcanus tavoyana) (Evans, 1925)
- Brown yamfly (Drina donina donina) (Hewitson, [1865])
- White imperial (Neomyrina nivea hiemalis) (Godman & Salvin, 1878)
- Yamfly (Loxura atymnus continentalis) Fruhstorfer, [1912]
- Branded yamfly (Yasoda tripunctata tripunctata) (Hewitson, [1863])
- Fruhstorfer's yamfly (Yasoda androconifera) Fruhstorfer, [1912]
- Cardinal (Thamala marciana marciana) (Hewitson, [1863])
- Common imperial (Cheritra freja evansi) Cowan, 1965
- Truncate imperial (Cheritrella truncipennis) de Niceville, 1887
- Blue imperial (Ticherra acte acte) (Moore, [1858])
- Siamese onyx (Ahmetia achaja achaja) (Fruhstorfer, [1912])
- Common posy (Drupadia ravindra boisduvalii) Moore, 1884
- Dark posy (Drupadia theda fabricii) Moore, 1884
- Blue posy (Drupadia scaeva cooperi) (Tytler, 1940)
- Silverstreak blue (Iraota timoleon timoleon) (Stoll, [1790])
- Scarce silverstreak (Iraota rochana boswelliana) Distant, 1885
- Blue leafblue (Amblypodia narada taooana) Moore, [1879]
- Purple leafblue (Amblypodia anita anita) Hewitson, 1862
- Pale bushblue (Arhopala aberrans) (de Niceville, [1889])
- Aberrant bushblue (Arhopala abseus indicus) Riley, 1923
- Tytler's dull oakblue (Arhopala ace arata) Tytler, 1915
- Large oakblue (Arhopala amantes amatrix) de Niceville, 1891
- Centaur oakblue (Arhopala centaurus nakula) (Felder & Felder, 1860)
- Large metallic oakblue (Arhopala aedias meritatas) Corbet, 1941
- Purple-glazed oakblue (Arhopala agaba) (Hewitson, 1862)
- De Niceville's oakblue (Arhopala agrata binghami) Corbet 1946
- White-stained oakblue (Arhopala aida aida) de Niceville, 1889
- Purple broken-band oakblue (Arhopala alitaeus mirabella) Doherty, 1889
- Magnificent oakblue (Arhopala anarte anarte) (Hewitson, 1862)
- Anthelus bushblue (Arhopala anthelus) (Westwood, [1852])
- Small tailless oakblue (Arhopala antimuta antimuta) Felder & Felder, [1865]
- Purple-brown tailless oakblue (Arhopala arvina aboe) de Niceville, 1895(Hewitson, [1863])
- Plain tailless oakblue (Arhopala asopia) (Hewitson, [1869])
- Broad-banded oakblue (Arhopala asinarus asinarus) Felder & Felder, [1865]
- Tailed disc oakblue (Arhopala atosia jahara) Corbet, 1941
- Dark broken-band oakblue (Arhopala atrax) (Hewitson, 1862)
- Grey-washed oakblue (Arhopala aurelia) (Evans, 1925)
- Powered oakblue (Arhopala bazalus teesta) (de Niceville, 1886)
- Burmese bushblue (Arhopala birmana birmana) (Moore, [1884])
- White-dot oakblue (Arhopala democritus democritus) (Fabricius, 1793)
- Frosted oakblue (Arhopala dispar dispar) Riley & Godfrey, 1921
- Violetdisc oakblue (Arhopala epimete duessa) Doherty, 1889
- Green oakblue (Arhopala eumolphus eumolphus) (Cramer, [1780])
- Spotless oakblue (Arhopala fulla ignara) Riley & Godfrey, 1921
- Tailess bushblue (Arhopala ganesa watsoni) Evans, 1912
- Doherty's green oakblue (Arhopala hellenore hellenore) Doherty, 1889
- Doherty's dull oakblue (Arhopala khamti) Doherty, 1891
- Pale yellow oakblue (Arhopala moolaiana maya) (Evans, 1932)
- Mutal oakblue (Arhopala muta merguiana) Corbet, 1941
- Hewitson's dull oakblue (Arhopala oenea oenea) (Hewitson, [1869])
- Opal oakblue (Arhopala opalina opalina) (Moore, [1884])
- Dusky bushblue (Arhopala paraganesa zephyretta) (Doherty, 1891)
- Hooked oakblue (Arhopala paramuta paramuta) (de Niceville, [1884])
- Yellowdisc oakblue (Arhopala perimuta perimuta) (Moore, [1858])
- Dark Himalayan oakblue (Arhopala rama ramosa) (Evans, 1925)
- Reddish-brown oakblue (Arhopala selta selta) (Hewitson, [1869])
- Sylhet oakblue (Arhopala silhetensis silhetensis) (Hewitson, 1862)
- Pointed oakblue (Arhopala singla) (de Niceville, 1885)
- Large spotted oakblue (Arhopala vihara hirava) Corbet, 1941
- Zambra oakblue (Arhopala zambra zambra) Swinhoe, [1911]
- Silky oakblue (Arhopala alax) (Evans, 1932)
- Darkie plushblue (Flos anniella artegal) Doherty, 1889
- Plain plushblue (Flos apidanus ahamus) Doherty, 1891
- Tailess plushblue (Flos areste) (Hewitson, 1862)
- Spangled plushblue (Flos asoka) (de Niceville, [1884])
- Bifid plushblue (Flos diardi diardi) (Hewitson, 1862)
- Shining plushblue (Flos fulgida fulgida) (Hewitson, [1863])
- Variegated plushblue (Flos adriana) (de Niceville, [1884])
- Many-tailed oakblue (Thaduka multicaudata multicaudata) Moore, [1879]
- Falcate oakblue (Mahathala ameria ameria) (Hewitson, 1862)
- Crenulate oakblue (Apporasa atkinsoni) (Hewitson, [1869])
- Red-edge (Semanga superba siamensis) Talbot, 1936
- Common acacia blue (Surendra quercetorum quercetorum) (Moore, [1858])
- Acacia blue (Surendra vivarna neritos) (Fruhstorfer, 1907)
- Silver streaked acacia blue (Zinaspa todara) (Moore, [1884])
- Commomn tinsel (Catapaecilma major albicans) Corbet, 1941
- Cornelian (Deudorix epijarbas epijarbas) (Moore, [1858])
- Scarce cornelian (Deudorix hypargyria hypargyria) (Elwes, [1893])
- Abnormal flash (Rapala duma) Hewitson, 1878
- Frustorfer's flash (Rapala melida nicevillei) Swinhoe, 1911
- Common flash (Rapala nissa ranta) Swinhoe, 1897
- Indigo flash (Rapala varuna orseis) Hewitson, [1863]
- Copper flash (Rapala pheretima petosiris) (Hewitson, [1863])
- Myanmar flash (Rapala hades) (de Niceville, 1895)
- Malayan red flash (Rapala damona) Swinhoe, 1890
- Common red flash (Rapala iarbus iarbus) (Fabricius, 1787)
- Slate flash (Rapala manea schistacea) (Moore, 1879)
- Scarce shot flash (Rapala scintilla scintilla) de Niceville, 1890
- Branded flash (Rapala tara) de Niceville, [1889]
- Brown flash (Rapala rectivitta) (Moore, 1879)
- Suffused flash (Rapala suffusa suffusa) (Moore, [1879])
- Broad spark (Sinthusa chandrana grotei) (Moore, [1884])
- Narrow spark (Sinthusa nasaka obscurata) Fruhstorfer, [1912]
- Lister's hairstreak (Pamela dudgeonii) (de Niceville, 1894)
- Green hairstreak (Novosatsuma oppocoenosa) Johnson, 1992
- Ahlbergia pluto (Leech, 1893)
- Common onyx (Horaga onyx onyx) (Moore, [1858])
- Violet onyx (Horaga albimacula viola) Moore, 1882
- Purple onyx (Horaga amethysta purpurescens) Corbet, 1941
- White onyx (Horaga takanamii) Seki & Saito, [2004]
- Orchid tit (Hypolycaena othona) Hewitson, 1865
- Blue tit (Hypolycaena kina inari) (Wileman, 1908)
- Common tit (Hypolycaena erylus himavantus) Fruhstorfer, [1912]
- Fluffy tit (Hypolycaena amasa amasa) Hewitson, [1865]
- Azure royal (Britomartis cleoboides cleoboides) (Elwes, [1893])
- Mandarin blue (Charana mandarina mandarina) (Hewitson, [1863])
- Broadtail royal (Creon cleobis cleobis) (Godart, [1824])
- White-banded royal (Dacalana cotys) (Hewitson, [1865])
- Spectacular royal (Dacalana inorthodoxa) Seki & Saito, 2006
- Diagonal royal (Dacalana penicilligera) (de Niceville, 1890)

== Family: Riodinidae ==
- Abnormal Judy (Abisara abnormis) Moore, [1884]
- Double-banded Judy (Abisara bifasciata angulata) Moore, [1879]
- White-spotted Judy (Abisara burnii timaeus) (Fruhstorfer, [1904])
- Plum Judy (Abisara echerius paionea) Fruhstorfer, [1914]
- Lesser Judy (Abisara freda freda) Bennett, 1957
- Dark Judy (Abisara fylla fylla) (Westwood, [1851])
- Two-spotted Judy (Abisara miyazakii shigehoi) K. & T. Saito, 2005
- Tailed Judy (Abisara neophron gratius) Fruhstorfer, 1912
- Forest Judy (Abisara saturata meta) Fruhstorfer, [1904]
- White-banded Judy (Abisara latifasciata) Inoué & Kawazoé, 1964
- Striped Punch (Dodona adonira adonira) Hewitson, [1866]
- White Punch (Dodona deodata deodata) Hewitson, 1876
- Lesser Punch (Dodona dipoea) Hewitson, [1866]
- Orange Punch (Dodona egeon egeon) (Westwood, [1851])
- Tailed Punch (Dodona eugenes venox) Fruhstorfer, 1912
- Katerina's Punch (Dodona katerina katerina) Monastyrskii & Devyatkin, 2000
- Spotted Punch (Dodona maculosa maculosa) Leech, 1890
- Mixed Punch (Dodona ouida ouida) Hewitson, [1866]
- Spectacular Punch (Dodona speciosa) Monastyrskii & Devyatkin, 2000
- Dark Punch (Dodona dracon dracon) de Nicéville, 1897
- Lesser harlequin (Laxita thuisto ephorus) (Fruhstorfer, [1904])
- Common red harlequin (Paralaxita telesia boulleti) (Fruhstorfer, [1914])
- Columbine (Stiboges nymphidia nymphidia) Butler, 1876
- Orange harlequin (Taxila haquinus berthae) Fruhstorfer, [1904]
- Dora's harlequin (Taxila dora) Fruhstorfer, [1904]
- Punchinello (Zemeros flegyas allica) (Fabricius, 1787)
- Mountain columbine (Stiboges elodinia) Fruhstorfer, [1914]
