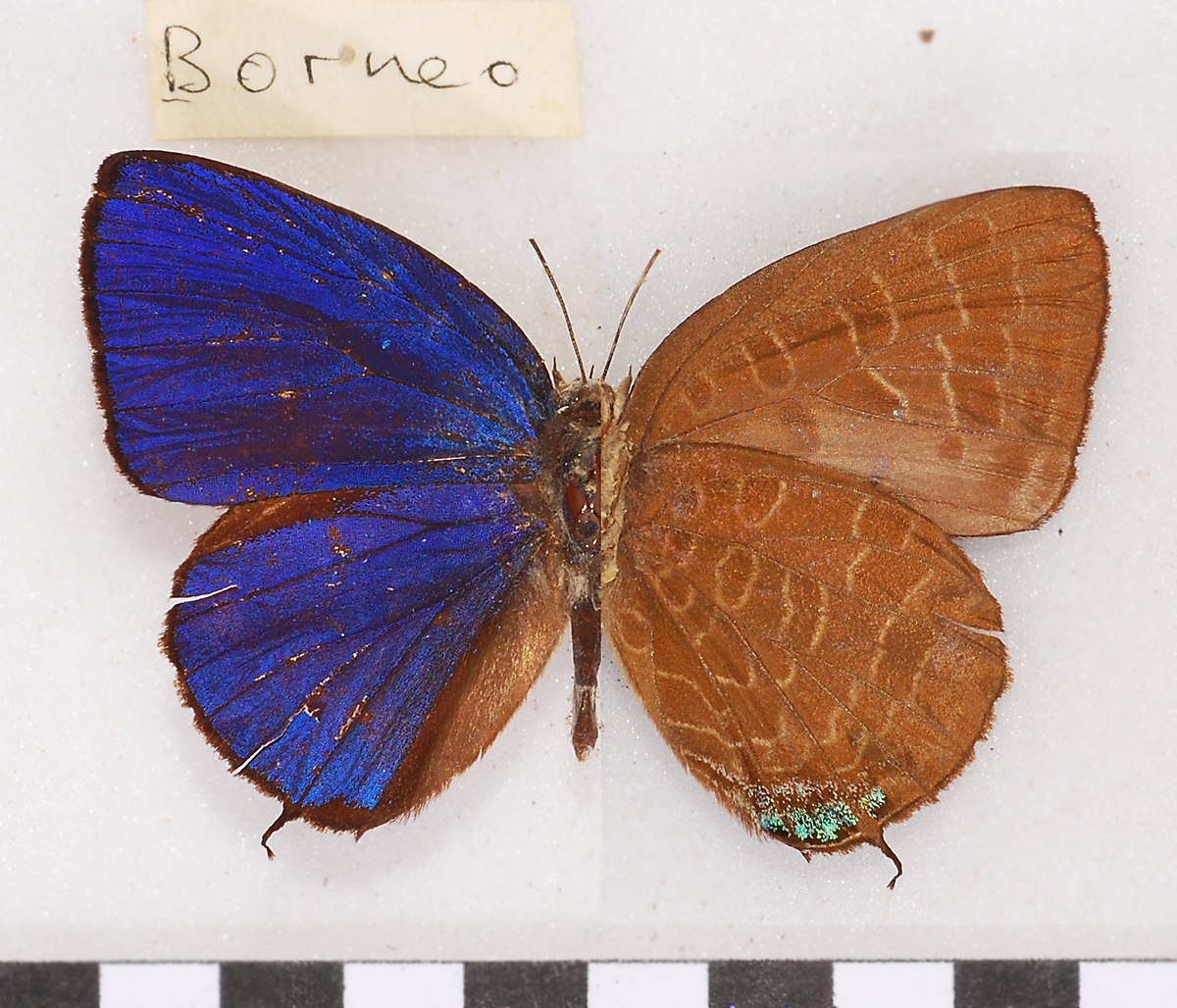
- Arhopala ace ace

Scientific classification
- Kingdom: Animalia
- Phylum: Arthropoda
- Clade: Pancrustacea
- Class: Insecta
- Order: Lepidoptera
- Family: Lycaenidae
- Genus: Arhopala
- Species: A. ace

Binomial name
- Arhopala ace de Nicéville, [1893]

= Arhopala ace =

Tytler's dull oakblue

Species of butterfly

Arhopala ace, or Tytler's dull oakblue, is a species of butterfly belonging to the lycaenid family. It was described by Charles Lionel Augustus de Nicéville in 1893 and is found in Southeast Asia and Northeast India (Manipur, Burma, Thailand, Vietnam, Peninsular Malaya, Sumatra and Borneo).

== Description ==
In the male distinguished by a narrower black margin of the forewing which also shows a different blue. Beneath similar to agrata but the postmedian band of the forewing is much broader and beneath the 4th spot distinctly broken, whereas in agrata it is uniformly continued. Expanse of wings; 46 to 55 mm.

== Subspecies ==
- Arhopala ace ace (Peninsular Malaya, Sumatra, Borneo)
- Arhopala ace arata Tytler, 1915 (Manipur, Burma, Thailand, Vietnam)

== Etymology ==
The English name honours Harry Tytler.
