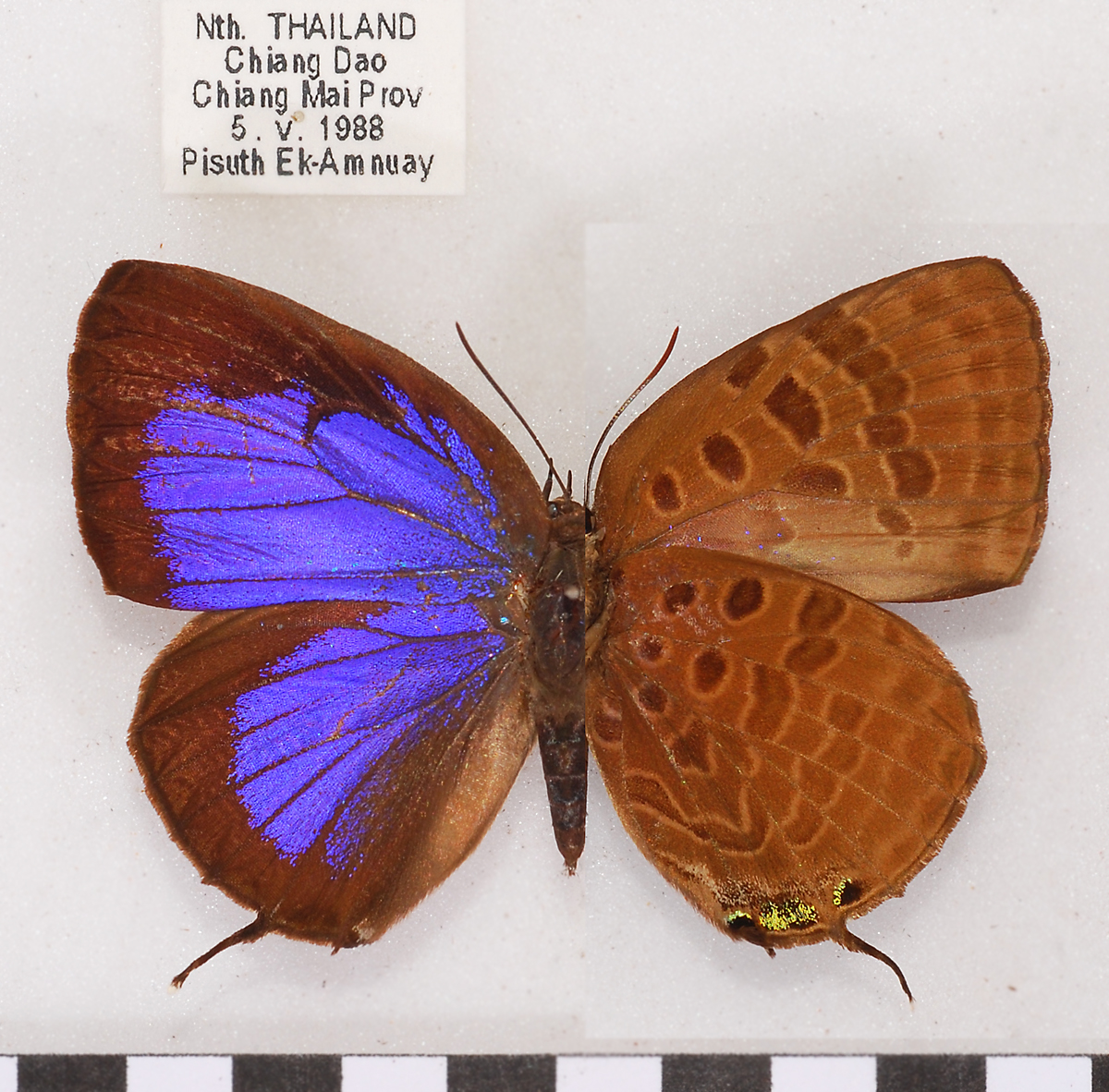

Scientific classification
- Kingdom: Animalia
- Phylum: Arthropoda
- Clade: Pancrustacea
- Class: Insecta
- Order: Lepidoptera
- Family: Lycaenidae
- Genus: Arhopala
- Species: A. zambra

Binomial name
- Arhopala zambra C. Swinhoe, [1911]

Synonyms
- Arhopala vandenberghi Corbet, 1941; Arhopala antura C. Swinhoe, [1911]; Arhopala georgias Piepers & Snellen, 1918; Narathura zambra plateni Evans, 1957

= Arhopala zambra =

Zambra oakblue

Species of butterfly

Arhopala zambra, the Zambra oakblue, is a species of butterfly belonging to the lycaenid family described by Charles Swinhoe in 1911. It is found in Southeast Asia (Myanmar, Thailand, Peninsular Malaya, Sumatra, Nia, Borneo, Bawean, Bangka, Java, the Philippines).

== Description ==
Male forewing 22 mm., deep blue border 0.5 mm.Female purple blue Similar to Arhopala adorea.The postmedian band has above a very broad black margin (female) . Below somewhat ochreous brown, markings well defined.

== Subspecies ==
- Arhopala zambra zambra (Burma, Thailand, Peninsular Malaysia, Sumatra, Nias, Borneo, Bawean, Bangka, Java)
- Arhopala zambra plateni (Evans, 1957) (Philippines: Mindanao)
- Arhopala zambra triviata Seki, 1994 (Philippines: Negros)
- Arhopala zambra kitamurai Seki, 1994 (Philippines: Mindoro)
