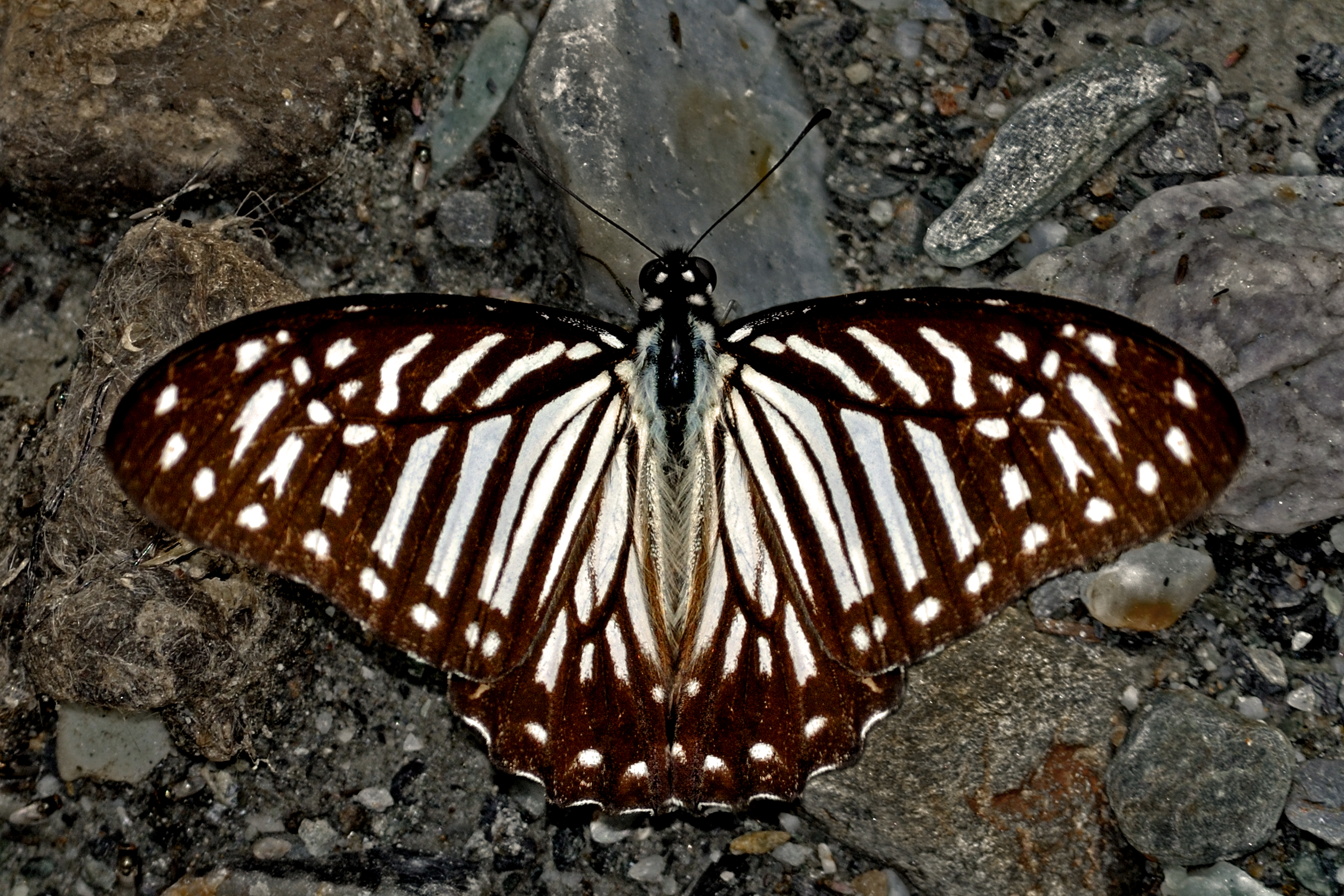

Scientific classification
- Kingdom: Animalia
- Phylum: Arthropoda
- Clade: Pancrustacea
- Class: Insecta
- Order: Lepidoptera
- Family: Papilionidae
- Genus: Graphium
- Species: G. macareus

Binomial name
- Graphium macareus Godart, 1819

Synonyms
- Graphium macareus

= Graphium macareus =

Lesser zebra

Species of butterfly

Graphium macareus, the lesser zebra, is a relatively common and not threatened species of swallowtail butterfly found in Southeast Asia. It is also found in parts of India including Assam and Sikkim.

== Subspecies ==
- G. m. macareus Java
- G. m. lioneli (Fruhstorfer, 1902) Burma, Assam, Manipur
- G. m. indicus (Rothschild, 1895) Sikkim, Khasia Hills, Tenasserim, Shan States
- G. m. perakensis (Fruhstorfer, 1899) Peninsular Malaya, Langkawi Island
- G. m. macaristus (Grose-Smith, 1887) Borneo
- G. m. xanthosoma (Staudinger, 1889) Sumatra
- G. m. mitis Jordan Hainan
- G. m. indochinensis (Fruhstorfer, 1901) Thailand, Indo-China
- G. m. albinovanus (Fruhstorfer, 1908) Bali
- G. m. burmensis Moonen, 1984 Burma, Thailand
- G. m. palawanicola (Koçak, 1980) Philippines (Balabac, Palawan)

== Description ==
Karl Jordan in Seitz (pages 103-104) provides a description differentiating macareus from nearby taxa and discussing some forms.

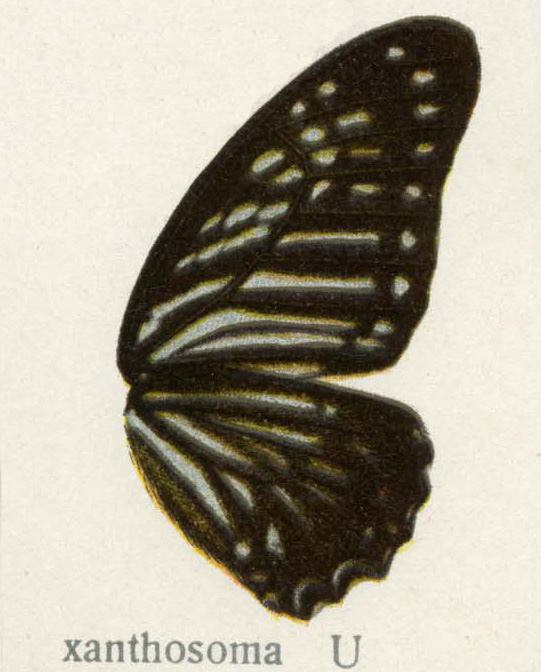
G. m. xanthosoma Staudinger, underside

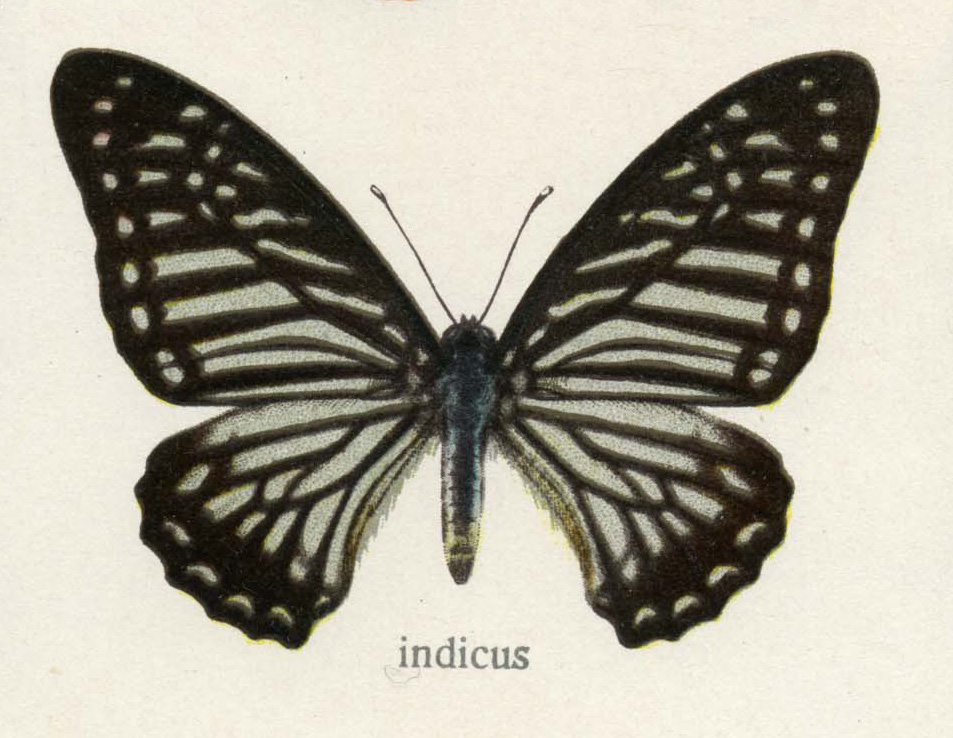
G. m. indicus Rothschild, 1895

Race indicus, Rothschild. Male. Upperside: ground colour and markings very similar to those of Graphium xenocles, but the former is of a more brownish-fuliginous tint and the latter are all very much narrower; also there are distinctly two well-divided streaks in interspace 1 of the forewing; on the hindwing there is never any tornal yellow spot, while the bluish-white streak in the coll is very often divided. Underside: similar to the upperside both in ground colour and markings, only the latter are much broader than on the upperside. It differs from the underside of G. xenocles by the absence in most specimens of the yellow tornal spot on the hindwing; also the terminal brown margin on the same wing is proportionately much broader and much darker. Antennas, head, thorax and abdomen coloured as in G. xenocles.

Female dimorphic or trimorphic. First form similar to male, with similar but proportionately broader markings (typical polynices). Second form similar to male with similar markings, but on the forewing the inner portion of the cell-streaks and the upper of the two spots at apex of cell, also the upper and lower of the four spots beyond the cell, obsolete or very faintly indicated; on the hindwing the streaks are very much narrower and there is a very small ochraceous-yellow tornal spot. Third form (indicus female, Rothschild): "Fore wings devoid of all markings except the submarginal ones; the hind wings provided with all the markings of the male, though these markings are shorter and less well-defined than in that sex." (Rothschild quoted in Bingham, 1907)

== Biology ==
The male congregate in swarms at wet places, whilst they are taken singly in the woods on flowers, on which they rest with the wings closed.macareus mimics Parantica aglea.

== See also ==
- List of butterflies of India
- List of butterflies of India (Papilionidae)
- Papilionidae
