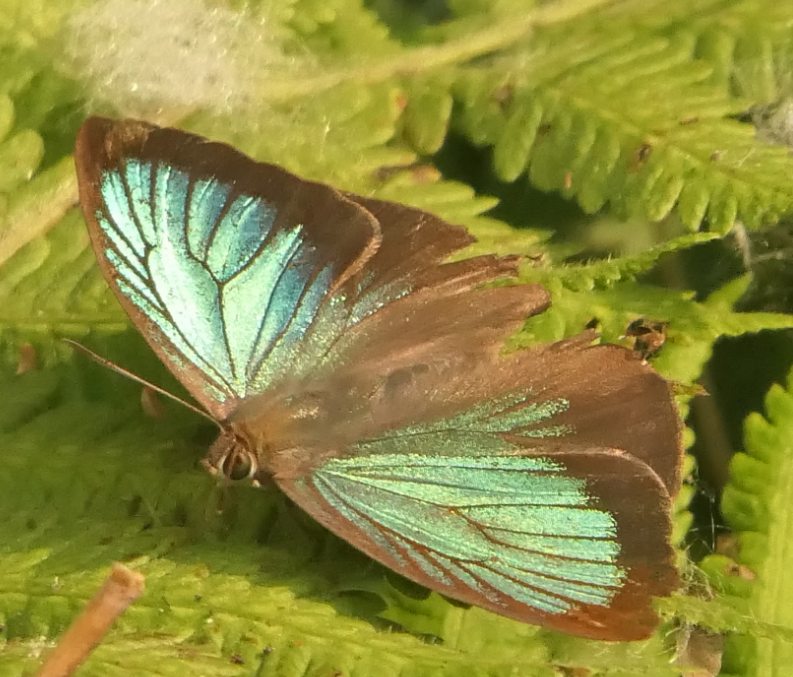

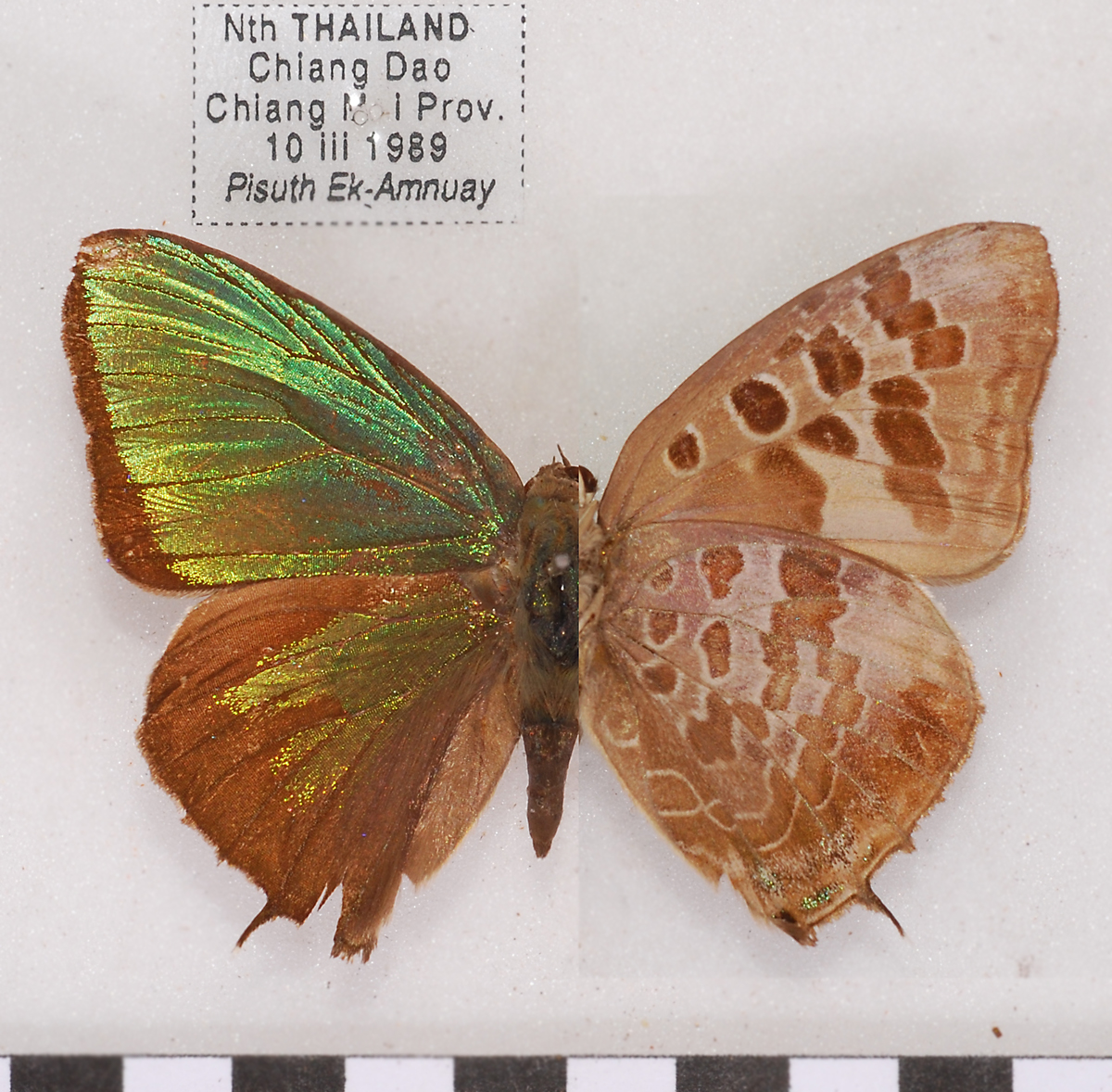

Scientific classification
- Kingdom: Animalia
- Phylum: Arthropoda
- Clade: Pancrustacea
- Class: Insecta
- Order: Lepidoptera
- Family: Lycaenidae
- Genus: Arhopala
- Species: A. hellenore

Binomial name
- Arhopala hellenore Doherty, 1889.

Synonyms
- Arhopala viridissima Swinhoe, 1890; Arhopala eumolphus sanherib Fruhstorfer, 1914; Arhopala eumolphus siroes Fruhstorfer, 1914

= Arhopala hellenore =

Doherty's green oakblue

Species of butterfly

Arhopala hellenore, Doherty's green oakblue, is a species of butterfly belonging to the lycaenid family described by William Doherty in 1889. It is found in Southeast Asia - Assam, Manipur, Burma, Mergui, Thailand, Indo China, Hainan (A. h. hellenore) Sumatra, Peninsular Malaya (A. h. siroes Fruhstorfer, 1914).

== Description ==
Very similar to Arhopala eumolphus but more pointed and longer wings, and beneath the coffee-brown markings are more intensely prominent in the whitish greyish-brown ground-colour.

== Subspecies ==
- Arhopala hellenore hellenore (Assam, Manipur, Burma, Mergui, Thailand, Indo China, Hainan)
- Arhopala hellenore siroes Fruhstorfer, 1914 (Sumatra, Peninsular Malaysia)- the male has such a narrow dark margin of the wings, that it is hardly yet recognisable in the apex of the forewing. Beneath the markings are particularly dark and surrounded by a bright white colour.
