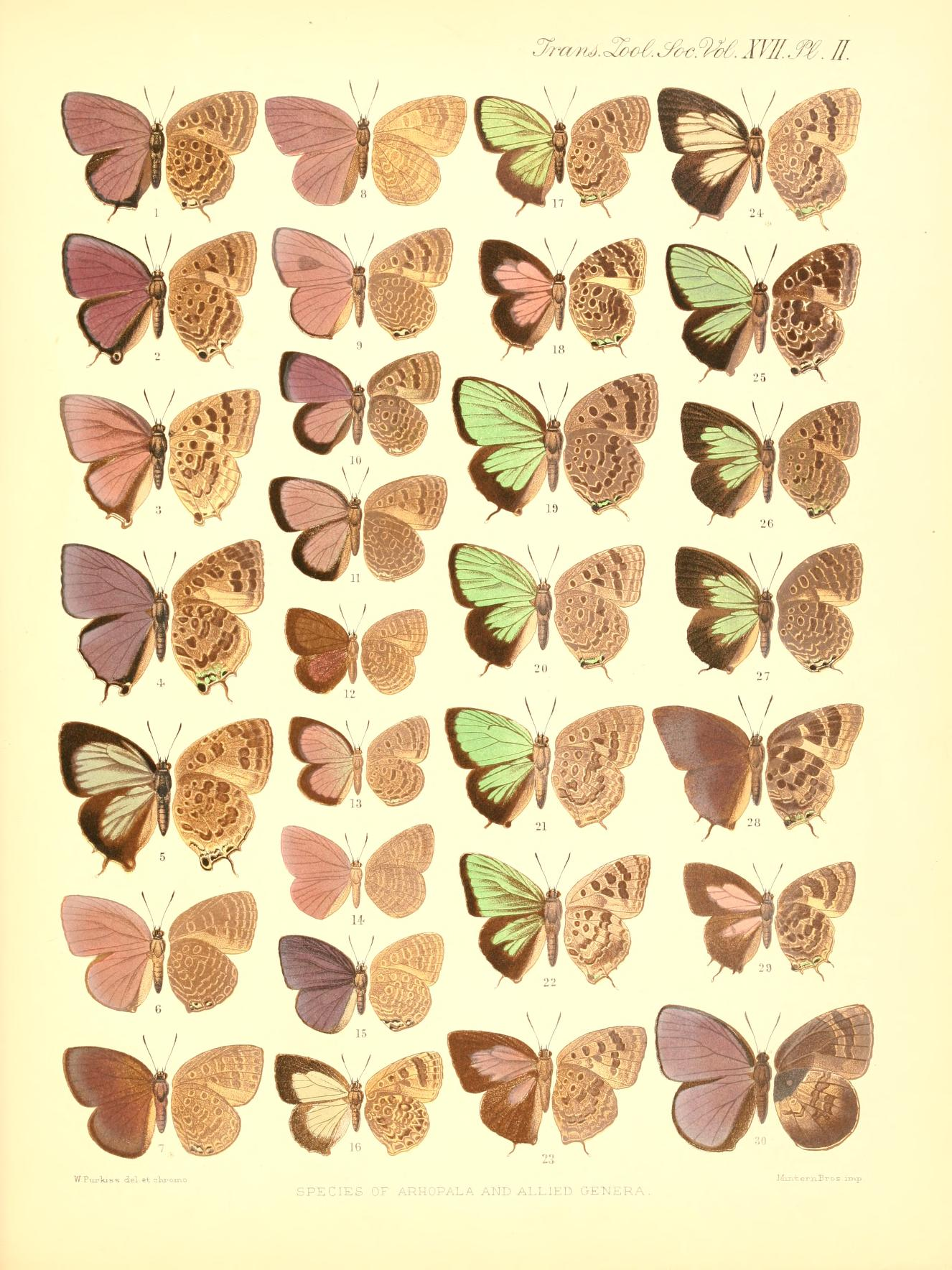
- Arhopala moolaiana in Bethune Baker (fig. 6 male)

Scientific classification
- Kingdom: Animalia
- Phylum: Arthropoda
- Clade: Pancrustacea
- Class: Insecta
- Order: Lepidoptera
- Family: Lycaenidae
- Genus: Arhopala
- Species: A. moolaiana

Binomial name
- Arhopala moolaiana ( Moore, [1879])

= Arhopala moolaiana =

Species of butterfly

Arhopala moolaiana or pale yellow oakblue, is a butterfly in the family Lycaenidae. It was described by Frederic Moore in 1879. It is found in the Indomalayan realm.

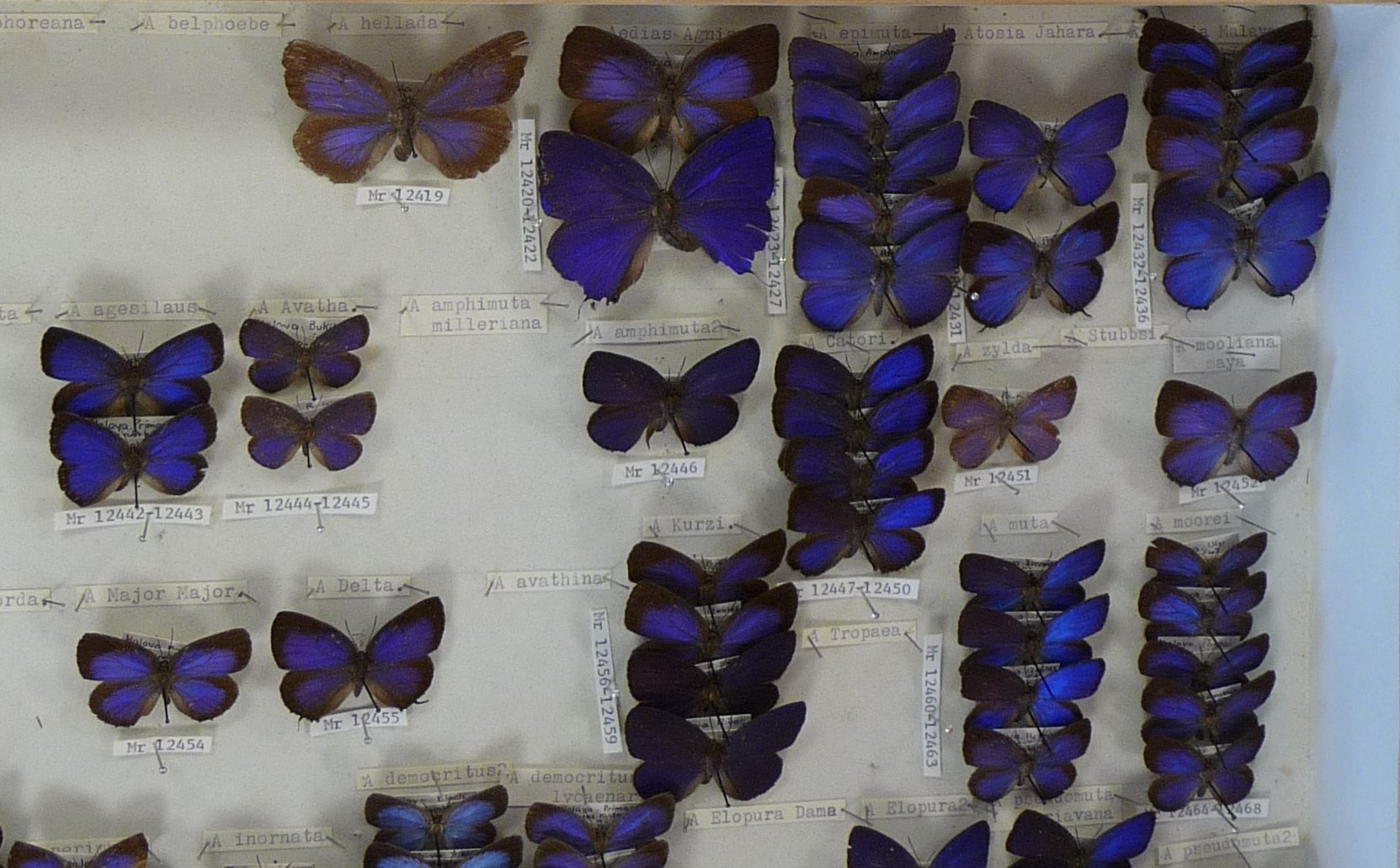
moolaiana and other Arhopala Malaya, Wilcocks collection

No tail; male sometimes more bluish-violet, sometimes more of a lilac tint; beneath in the cell of the forewing only 2, not 3 margined spots, the 4th spot of the postmedian band not distinctly, distally removed. Larger than Arhopala epimuta.

== Subspecies ==
- A. m. moolaiana Burma (Tavoy, Tenasserim, Ataran, Karen Hills)
- A. m. maya (Evans, 1932) Mergui, Thailand
- A. m. yajuna Corbet, 1941 Sumatra, Peninsular Malaya, Borneo
- A. m. klossi Corbet, 1941 Siberut, Sipora, Pagi
