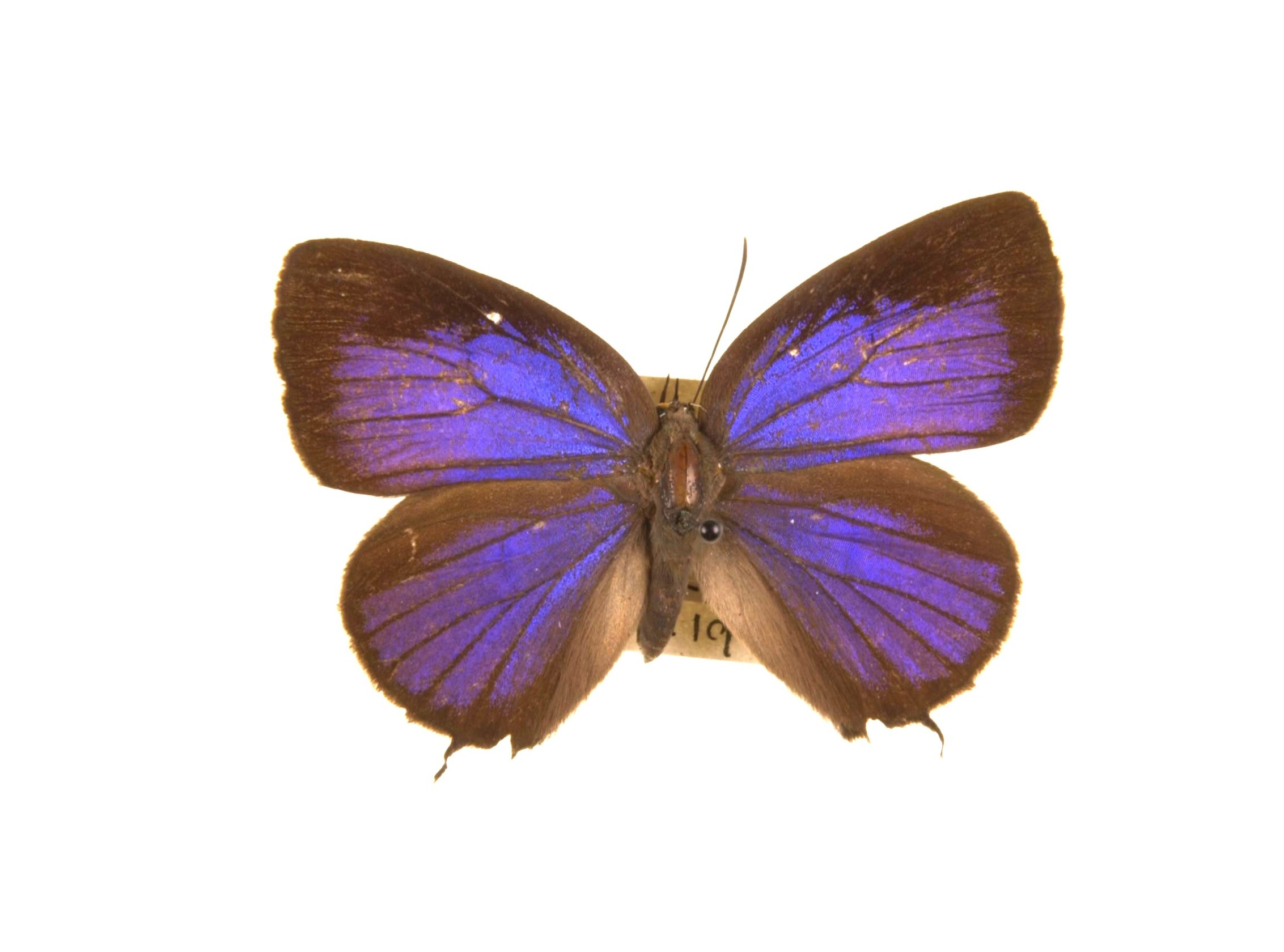
- Male, upperside, from Malaya

Scientific classification
- Kingdom: Animalia
- Phylum: Arthropoda
- Clade: Pancrustacea
- Class: Insecta
- Order: Lepidoptera
- Family: Lycaenidae
- Genus: Arhopala
- Species: A. agrata

Binomial name
- Arhopala agrata (de Nicéville, 1890)

Synonyms
- Amblypodia agrata

= Arhopala agrata =

De Nicéville's oakblue

Species of butterfly

Arhopala agrata, or de Nicéville's oakblue, is a species of lycaenid or blue butterfly found in Southeast Asia (Manipur - Myanmar, Singapore, Peninsular Malaya, Sumatra, Java, Nias, Assam, Myanmar, Thailand, Mergui, Borneo, Pulau Laut, Palawan and the Philippines). The species was first described by Lionel de Nicéville in 1890.

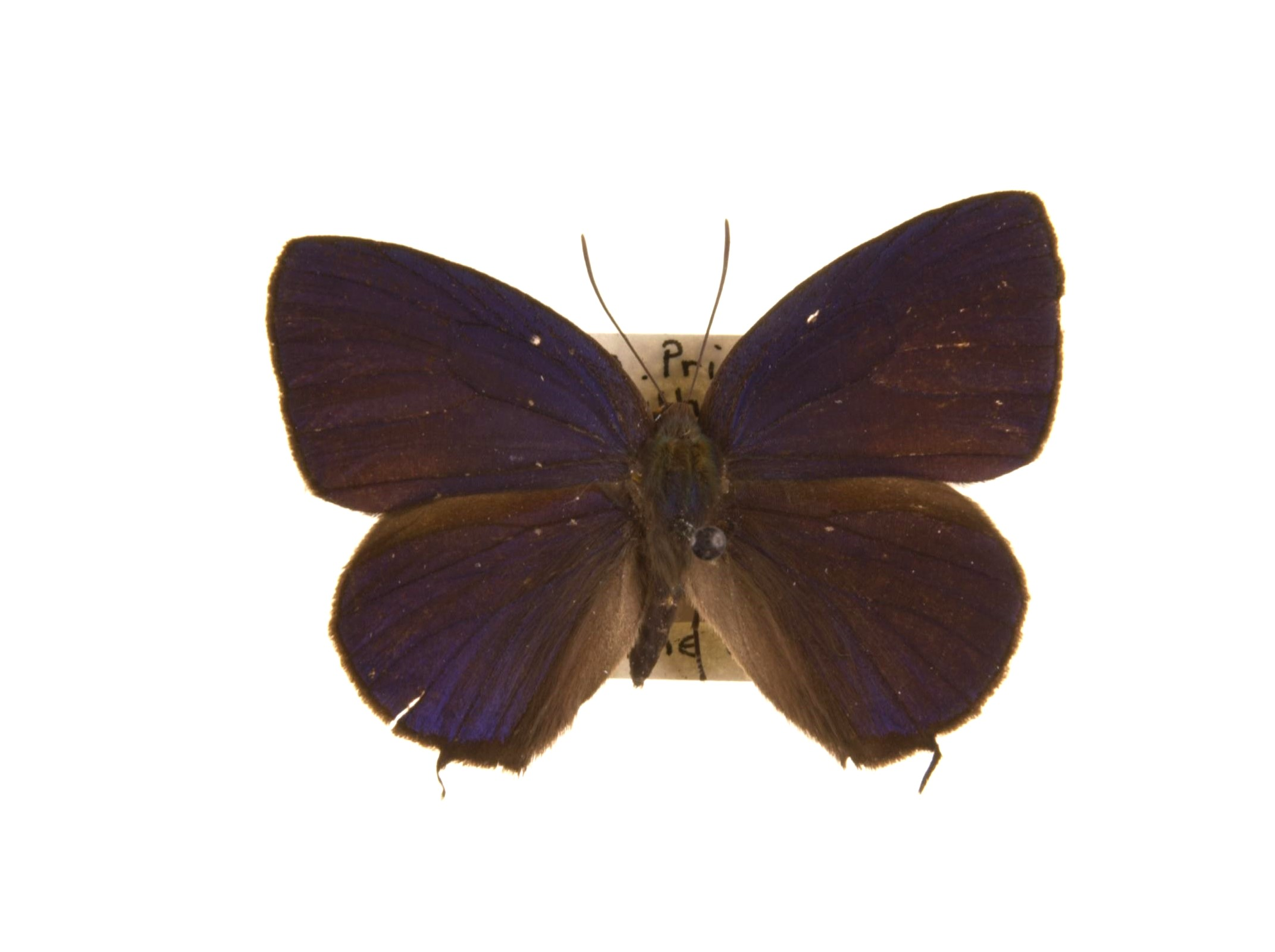
Female, upperside

== Description ==
Arhopala agratais is somewhat similar to azinis, but larger, darker blue above and without the black margin. Beneath extremely similar to azinis, but in the proximal portions of the wings the spots are somewhat more distinctly separated.
