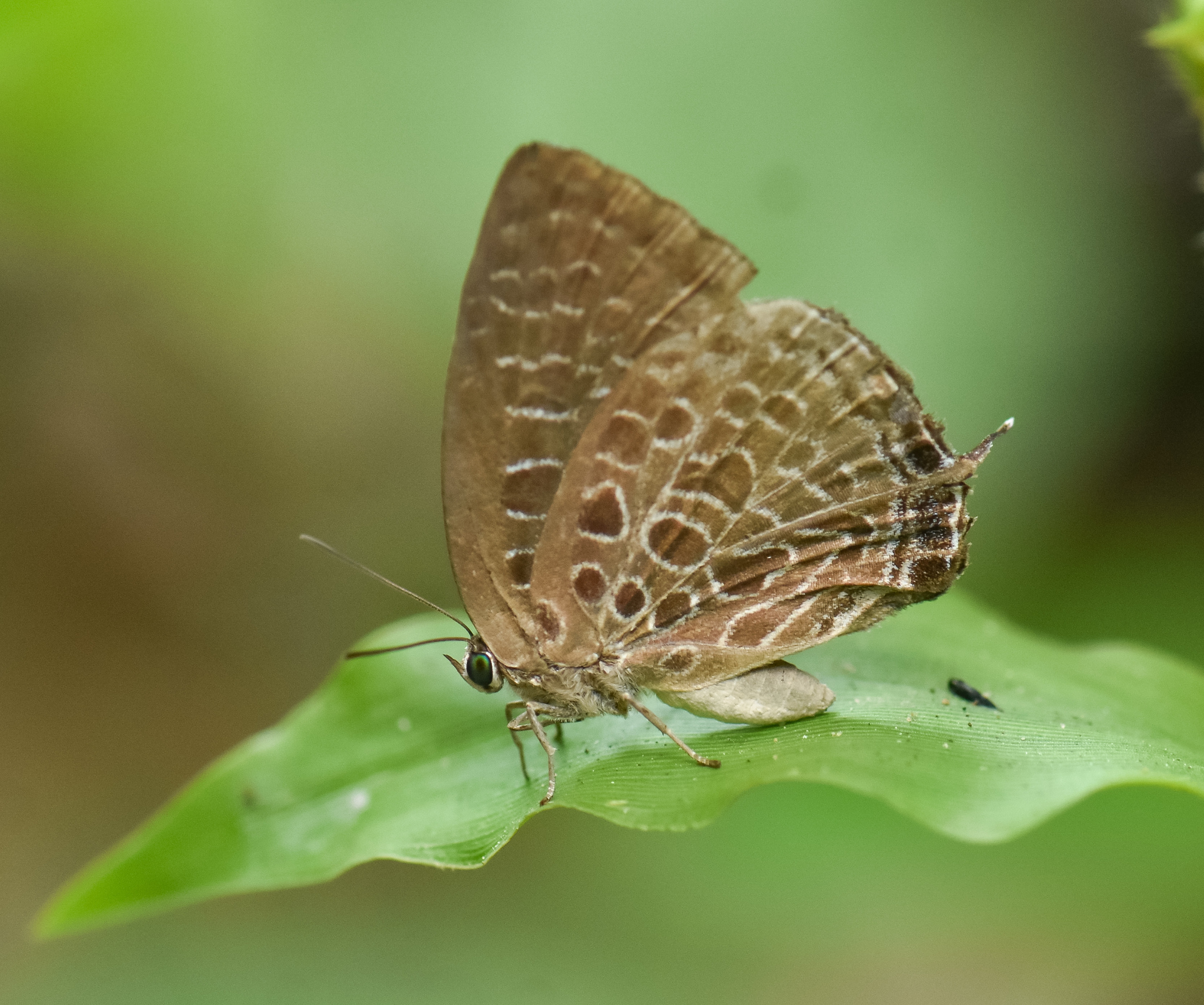

Scientific classification
- Kingdom: Animalia
- Phylum: Arthropoda
- Clade: Pancrustacea
- Class: Insecta
- Order: Lepidoptera
- Family: Lycaenidae
- Genus: Arhopala
- Species: A. dispar

Binomial name
- Arhopala dispar Riley & Godfrey, 1921

= Arhopala dispar =

Species of butterfly

Arhopala dispar, commonly known as frosted oakblue, is a species of butterfly in the family Lycaenidae. It was described by Norman Denbigh Riley and Edward John Godfrey in 1921. It is found in the Indomalayan realm.

== Subspecies ==
- A. d. dispar Thailand, Burma
- A. d. pendleburyi Corbet, 1941 Peninsular Malaya
