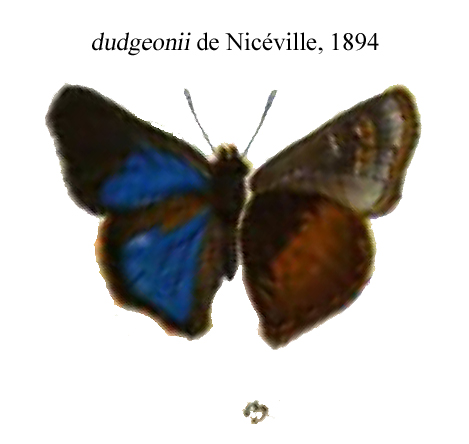
- Pamela dudgeonii

Scientific classification
- Domain: Eukaryota
- Kingdom: Animalia
- Phylum: Arthropoda
- Class: Insecta
- Order: Lepidoptera
- Family: Lycaenidae
- Genus: Pamela; Hemming, 1935
- Species: P. dudgeonii

Binomial name
- Pamela dudgeonii (de Nicéville, 1894)

Synonyms
- Listeria dudgeoni

= Pamela (butterfly) =

Lister's hairstreak

Monotypic butterfly genus in family Lycaenidae

Pamela is a monotypic butterfly genus in the family Lycaenidae containing the species Pamela dudgeonii, the Lister's hairstreak. It is a small butterfly found in India (Himalayas, Mussoorie, and Sikkim).

== See also ==
- List of butterflies of India
- List of butterflies of India (Lycaenidae)
