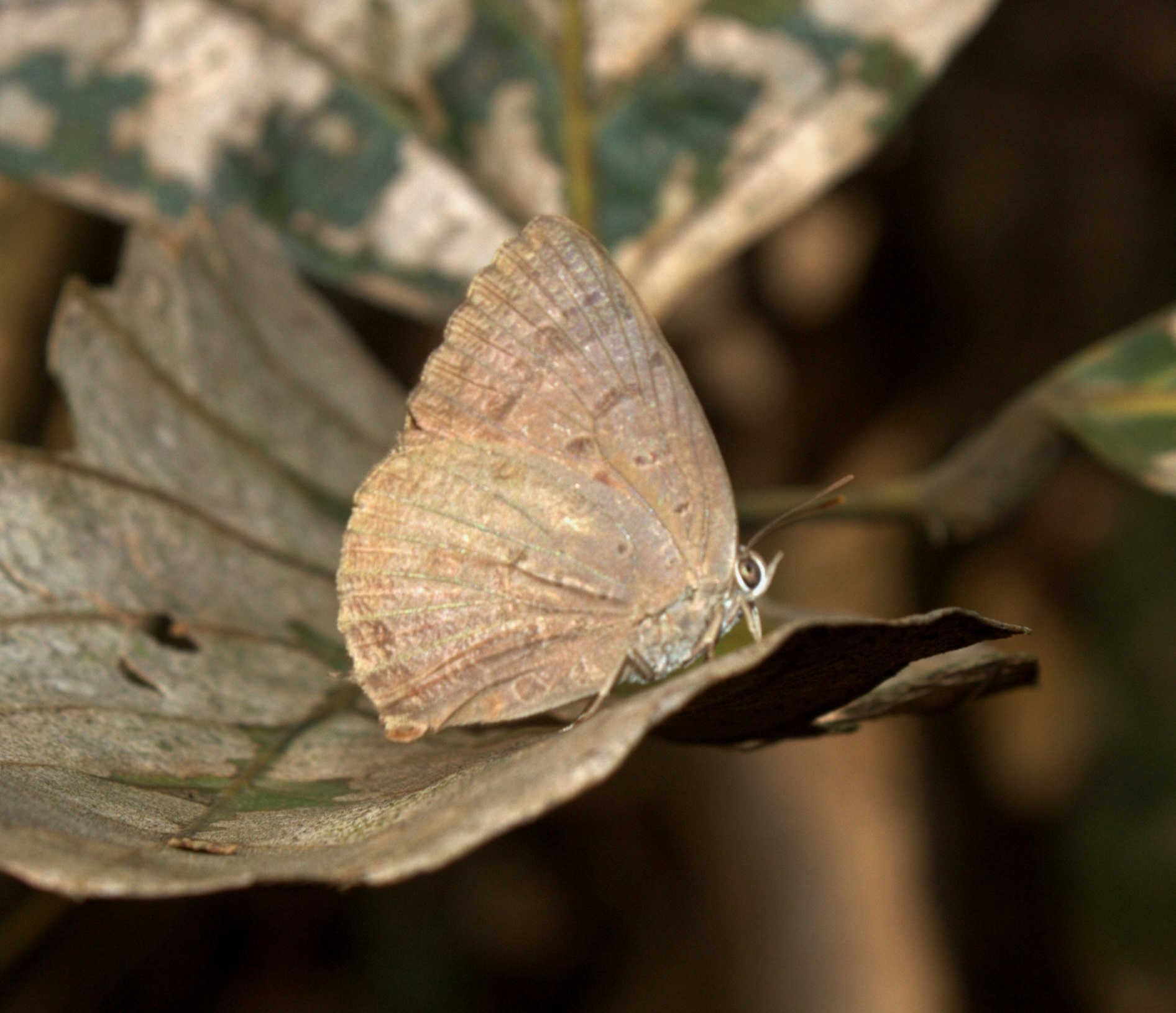

Scientific classification
- Kingdom: Animalia
- Phylum: Arthropoda
- Clade: Pancrustacea
- Class: Insecta
- Order: Lepidoptera
- Family: Lycaenidae
- Genus: Arhopala
- Species: A. atrax

Binomial name
- Arhopala atrax (Hewitson, 1862)

= Arhopala atrax =

Dark broken-band oakblue

Species of butterfly

Arhopala atrax, the dark broken-band oakblue or Indian oakblue, is a species of lycaenid or blue butterfly found in the Indomalayan realm (India, Myanmar to Malaya).

== Description ==
Male. Upperside purplish-blue, shining in certain lights. Forewing with a narrow costal black band, outer marginal black band about twice as broad. Hindwing with the costal space and outer marginal line black, tail black, tipped with white, indications of a blackish spot on the margin on each side of the tail, abdominal fold grey. Cilia black, with white tips. Underside pale brown, with a lilac tint, markings darker brown, edged with white. Forewing with three oval cell spots, increasing in size outwards, an outwardly oblique spot below the last, and another in the next lower interspace, slightly outwardly oblique below the middle cell spot, well separated from each other; a discal band of seven spots, the first four conjoined, outwardly oblique, the second and fourth a little outwards, the fifth inwards, its upper outer end almost touching the lower inner end of the fourth, and joined to the sixth outwardly obliquely, the seventh similarly inwards and similarly oblique, with a small mark attached to its lower end, the hinder marginal space below and between these spots pale. Hindwing with four sub-basal spots almost in a line, the fourth being a little inwards, followed by three slightly larger oval spots in a line, the third of irregular shape, an outwardly curved bar at the end of the cell, with a small spot attached to its lower end, a discal series of eight spots, the first two below the costa, the lower ends of the second touching the upper ends of the discoidal bar and the third spot, this conjoined with the other four spots in an outward curve, the fourth and sixth shifted outwards, the seventh angular as usual, both wings with a brown marginal line, a submarginal, somewhat lunular band, and between them a series of smaller lunular marks. Female. Upperside brighter blue, and paler. Forewing with a black spot at the end of the cell running into the broad black costal band which widens gradually from the base, is very broad at the apex and is continued broadly and evenly down the outer margin. Hindwing with the costa and outer margin very broadly black. Underside as in the male.

— Charles Swinhoe, Lepidoptera Indica. Vol. VIII

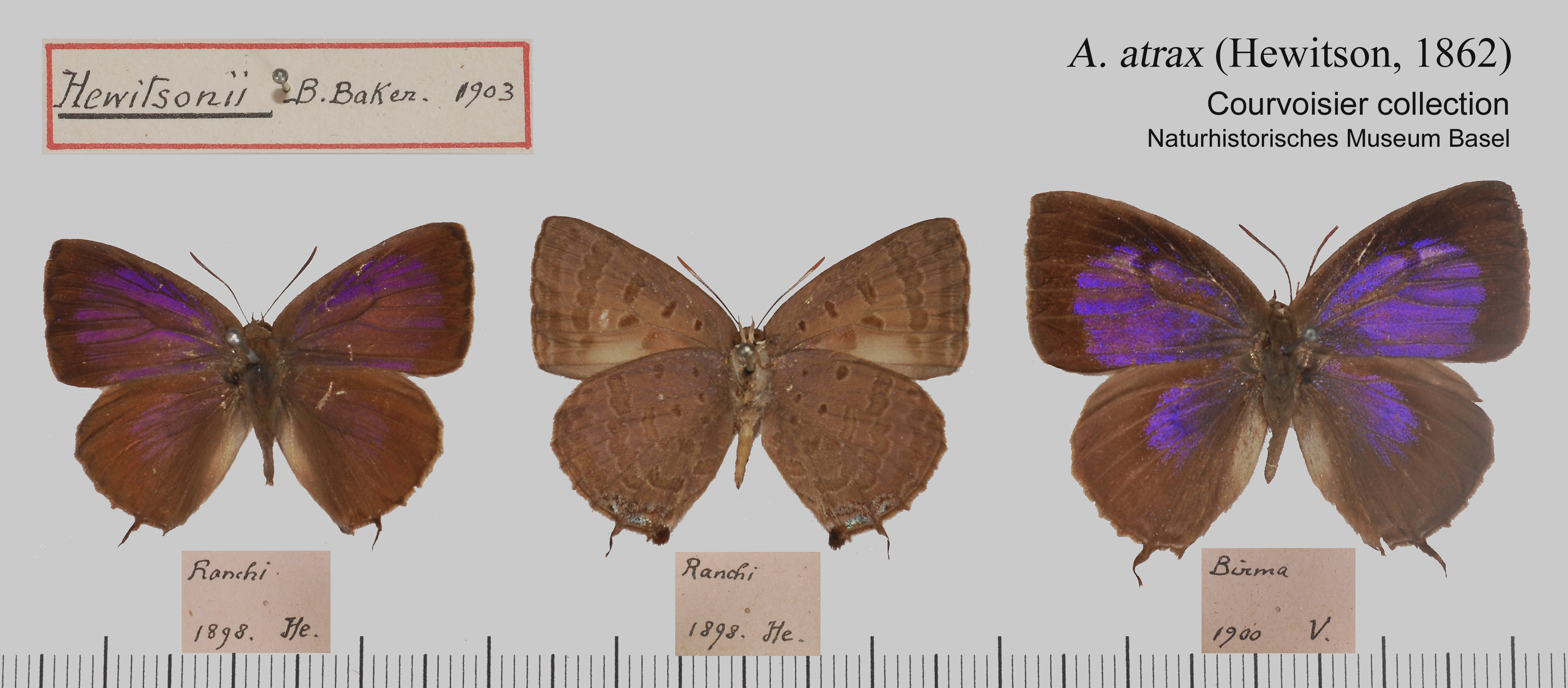
Arhopala atrax Courvoisier Collection, Basel

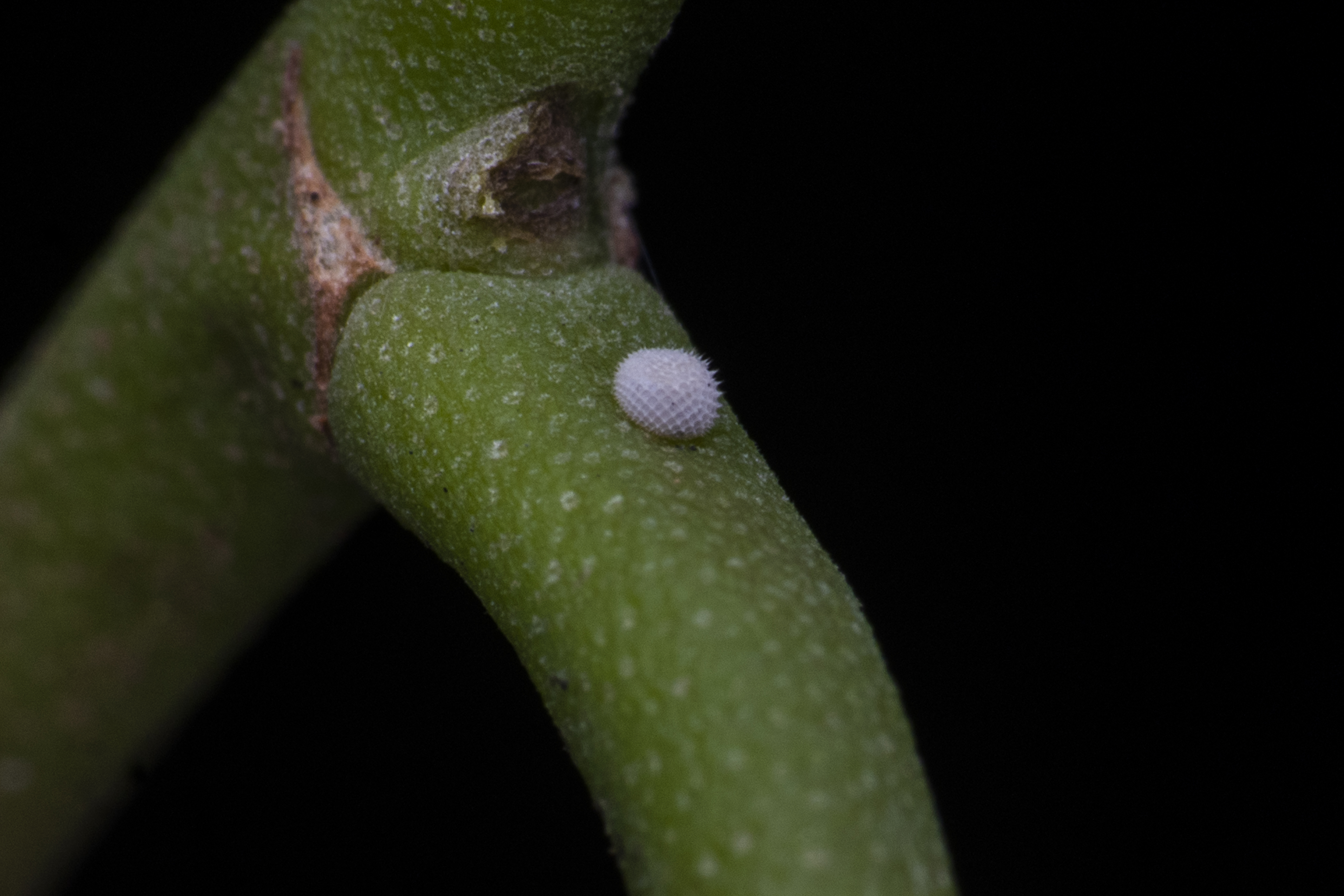
Egg

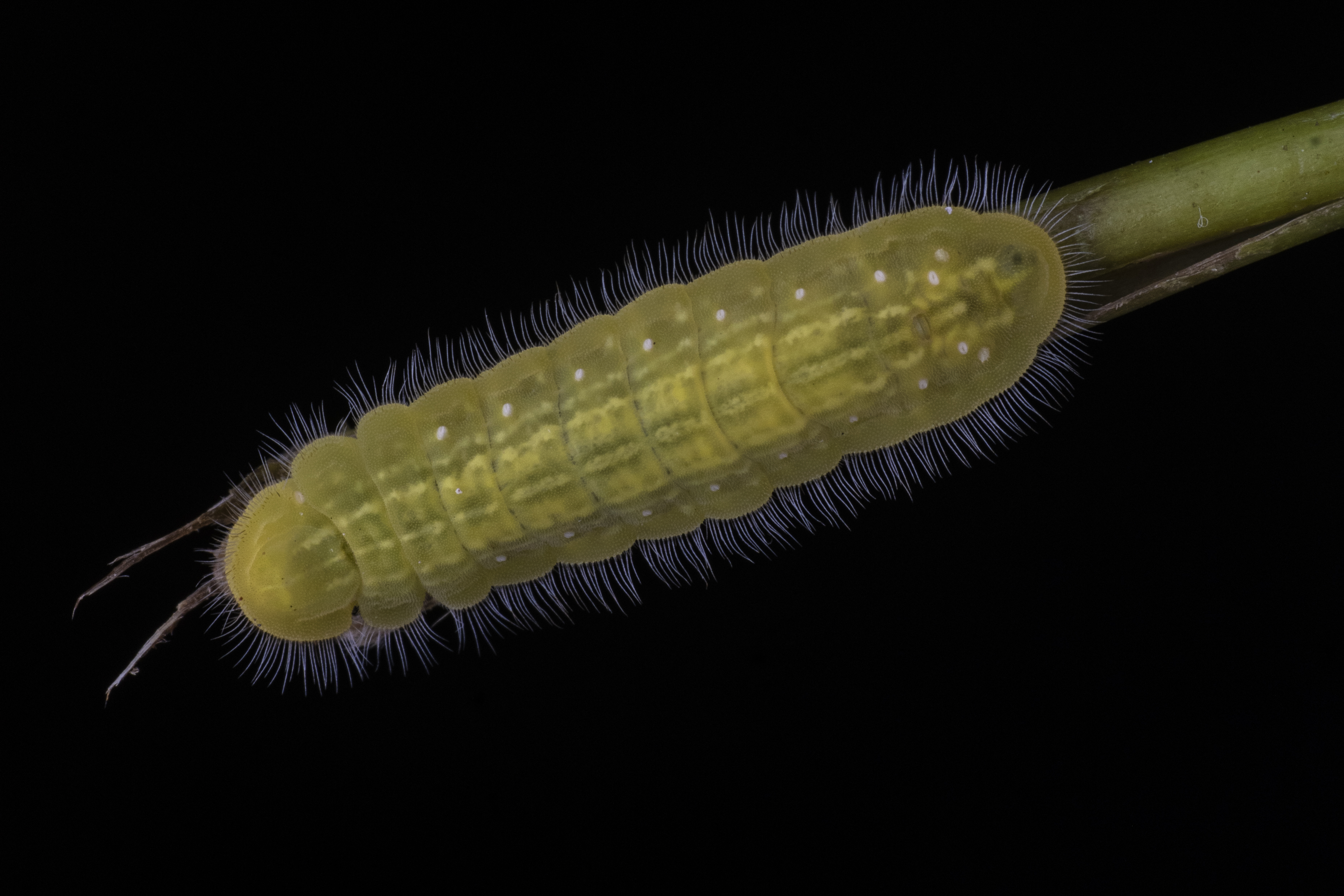
Caterpillar

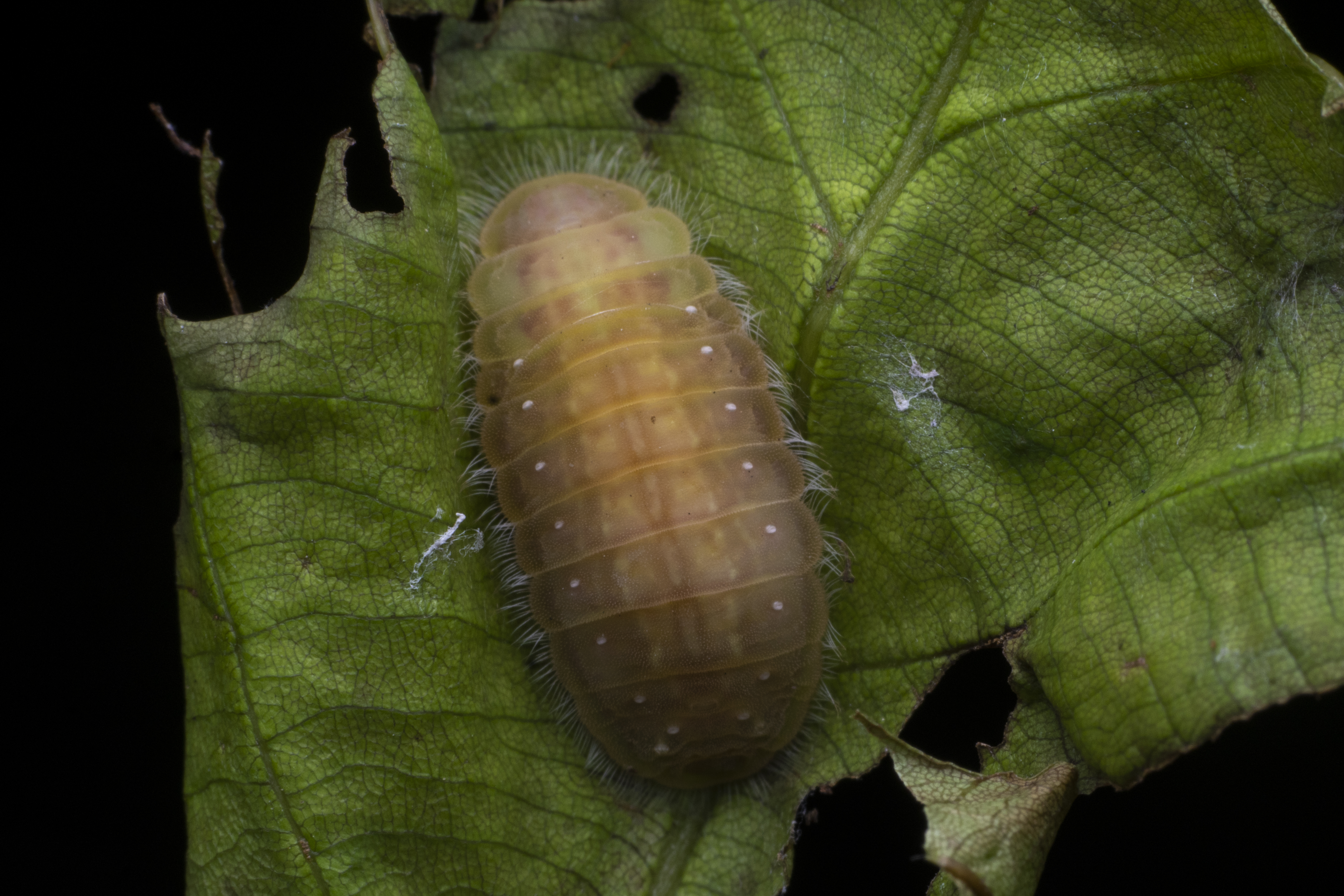
Pre-pupa stage

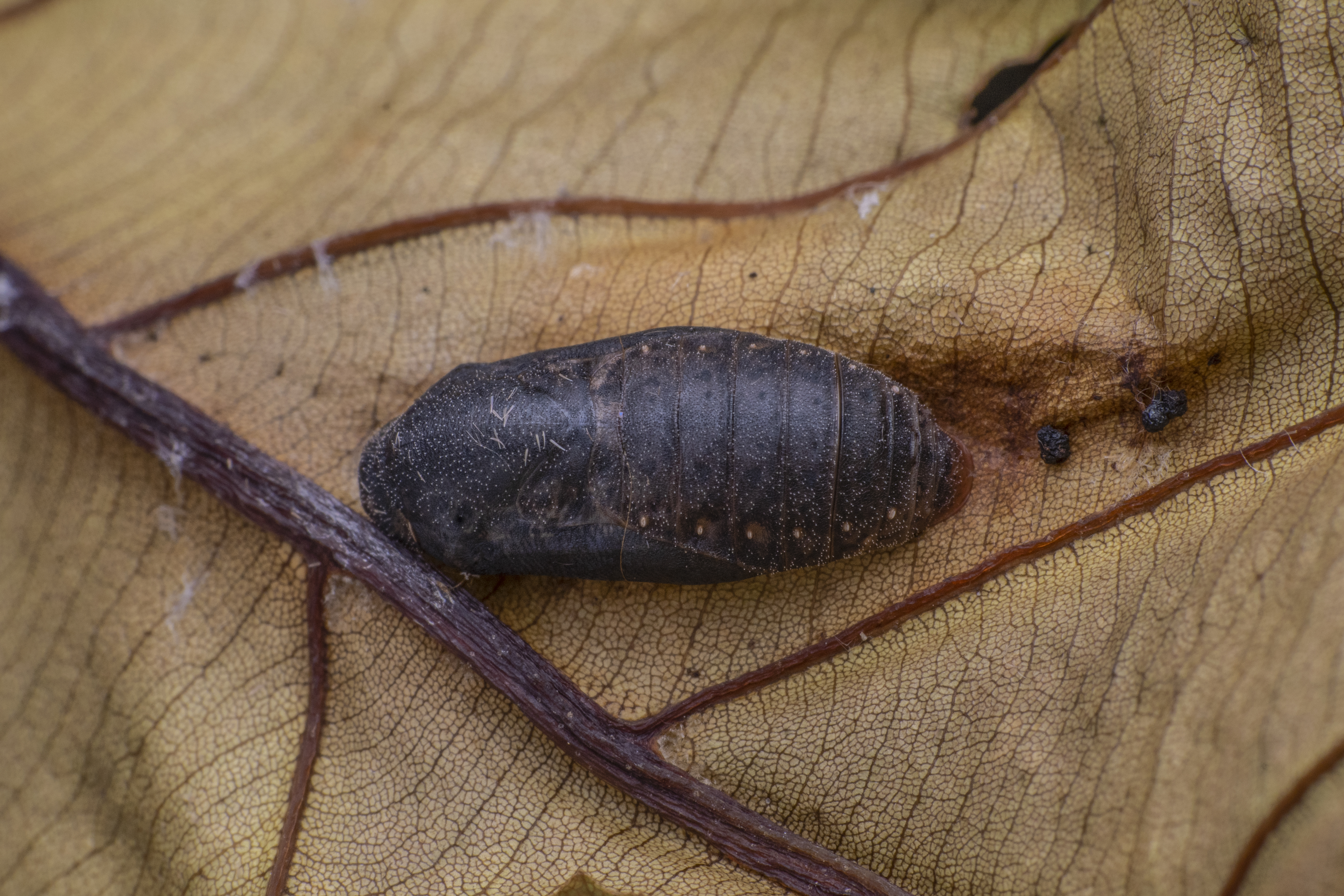
Pupa

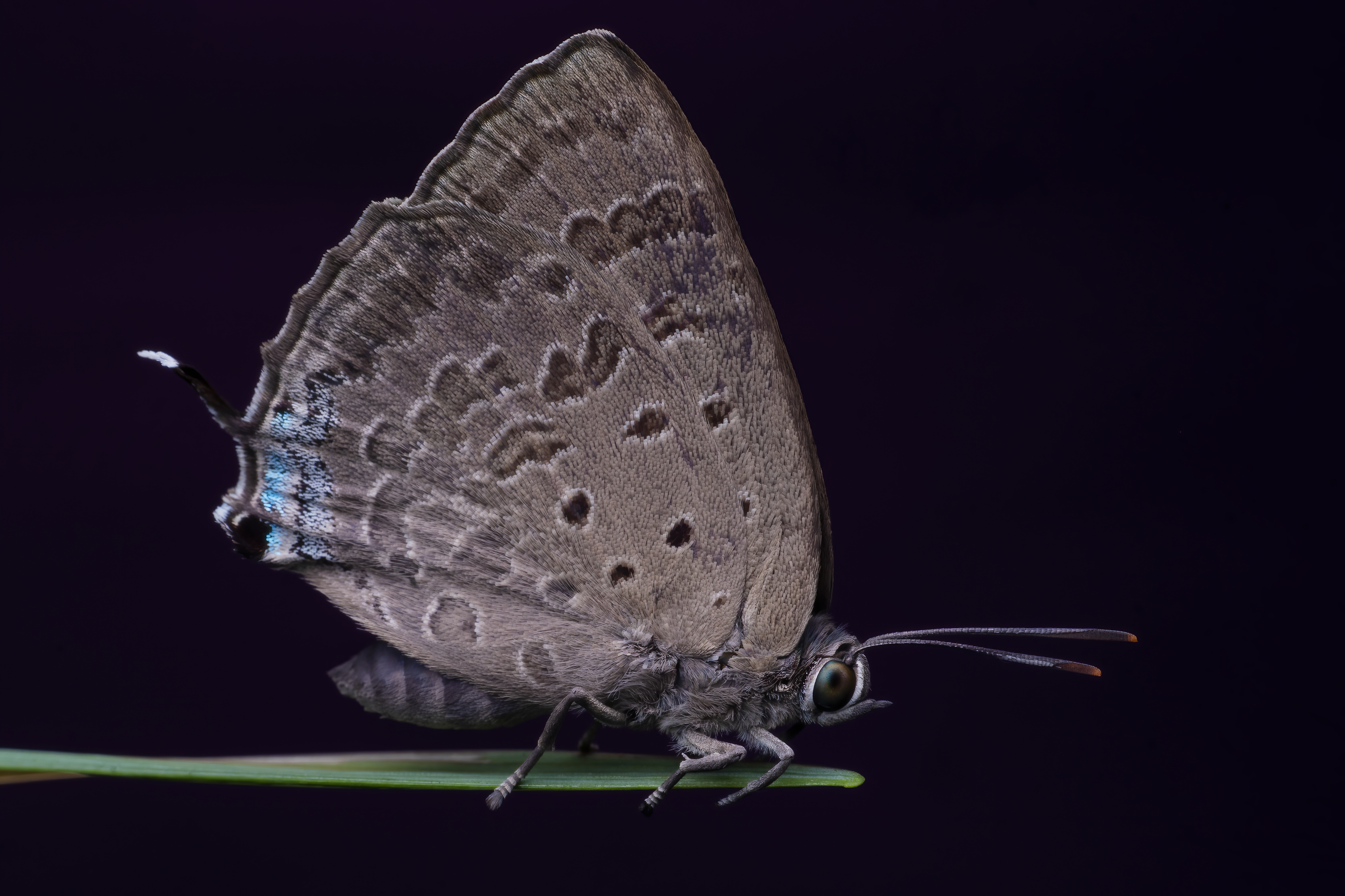
newly eclosed
