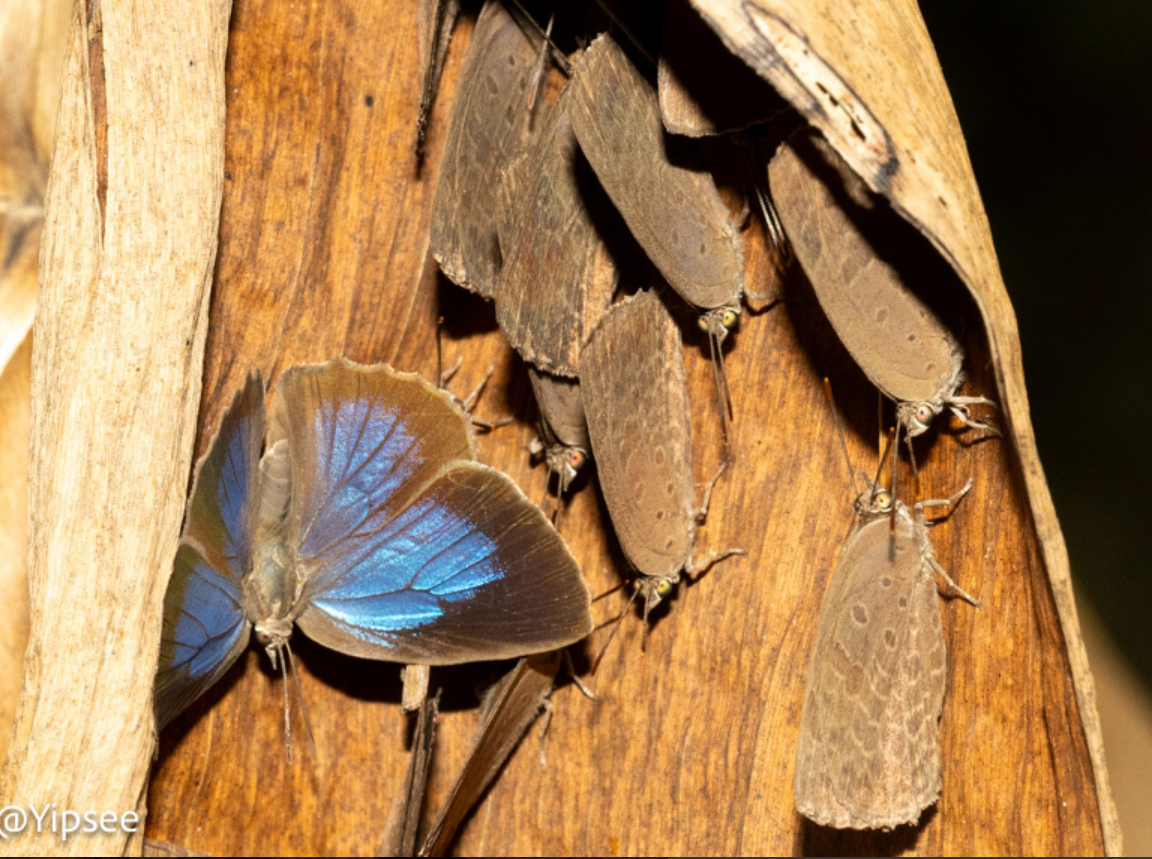

Scientific classification
- Kingdom: Animalia
- Phylum: Arthropoda
- Clade: Pancrustacea
- Class: Insecta
- Order: Lepidoptera
- Family: Lycaenidae
- Genus: Arhopala
- Species: A. asopia

Binomial name
- Arhopala asopia (Hewitson, 1869

= Arhopala asopia =

Plain tailless oakblue

Species of butterfly

Arhopala asopia, the plain tailless oakblue, is a butterfly in the family Lycaenidae. It was described by William Chapman Hewitson in 1869. It is found in the Indomalayan realm (Manipur, Assam, Burma, Thailand, and Laos).

== Description ==
Beneath lighter yellowish) brown otherwise very similar to [related species], particularly in the marking; the most conspicuous is the very much lighter, whitish spot in the subanal region of the forewing. Distinctly separated above in the male by being quite light violettish-blue with a blackish-brown marginal band of more than 3 mm width.
