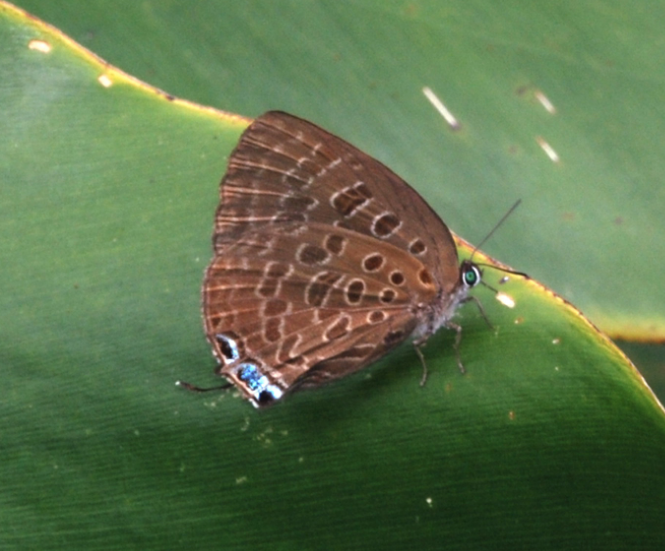

Scientific classification
- Kingdom: Animalia
- Phylum: Arthropoda
- Clade: Pancrustacea
- Class: Insecta
- Order: Lepidoptera
- Family: Lycaenidae
- Genus: Arhopala
- Species: A. opalina

Binomial name
- Arhopala opalina (Moore, 1883)

Synonyms
- Nilasera opalina (Moore, 1883)

= Arhopala opalina =

Opal oakblue

Species of butterfly

Arhopala opalina, the opal oakblue, is a species of lycaenid or blue butterfly found in Assam, Burma, Thailand, the Malay Peninsula and Java.

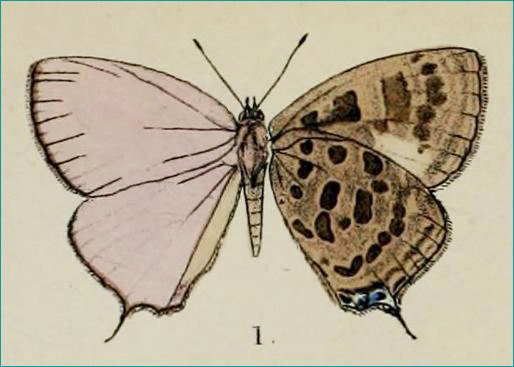
Arhopala opalone, male, from Khasia Hills, Patkai, in northern India from original description by Moore, 1884.

This species (according to Niceville) looks like a miniature form of camdeo from which, however, it differs as follows: the blue of the upper surface is more lilac and the whitish spot in the disc of the forewing is entirely absent. The spots beneath are less distinct, and their distal bordering by a fine white line, as in camdeo, is absent here. Besides the spots beneath are also somewhat differently shaped. The species of which only 1 male was known at the time of the description, has an expanse of but 38 mm and occurs in the Khasia Hills, being apparently rare.
