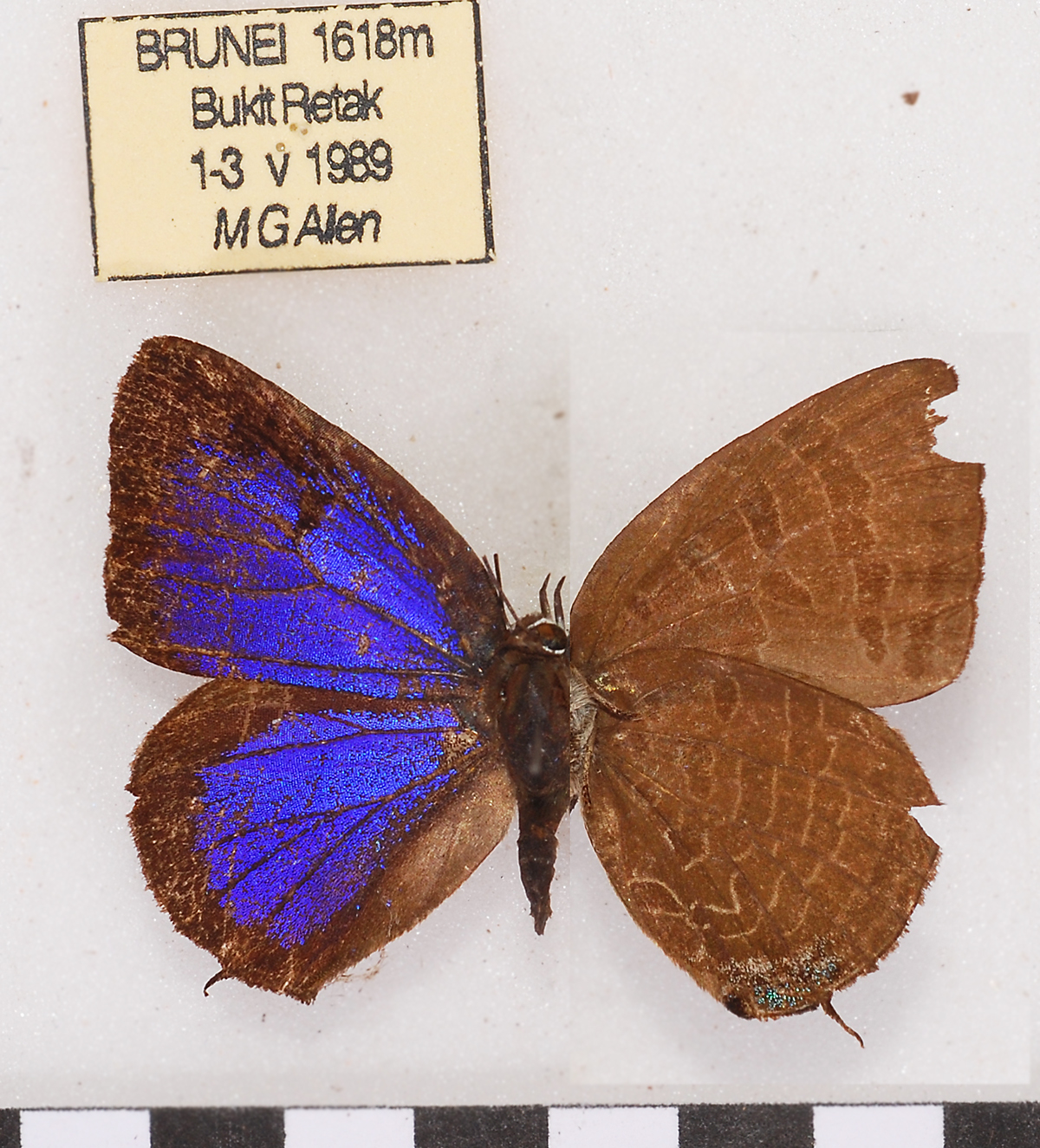

Scientific classification
- Kingdom: Animalia
- Phylum: Arthropoda
- Clade: Pancrustacea
- Class: Insecta
- Order: Lepidoptera
- Family: Lycaenidae
- Genus: Arhopala
- Species: A. azinis

Binomial name
- Arhopala azinis de Nicéville, 1896

Synonyms
- Arhopala kounga Bethune-Baker, 1896

= Arhopala azinis =

Species of butterfly

Arhopala azinis is a species of butterfly belonging to the lycaenid family described by Lionel de Nicéville in 1896. It is found in Southeast Asia (Peninsular Malaya, Sumatra and Java).

== Description ==
Has the shape, size, and the approximate upper surface of one of the (tailed) forms of a male of the European Zephyrus quercus. The under surface exhibits the transverse bands and spots almost only by their light borders; the anal blue of the hindwing is distinct.

== Subspecies ==
- Arhopala azinis azinis (Peninsular Malaysia, Sumatra, Java)
- Arhopala azinis kounga Bethune-Baker, 1896 (Borneo)
