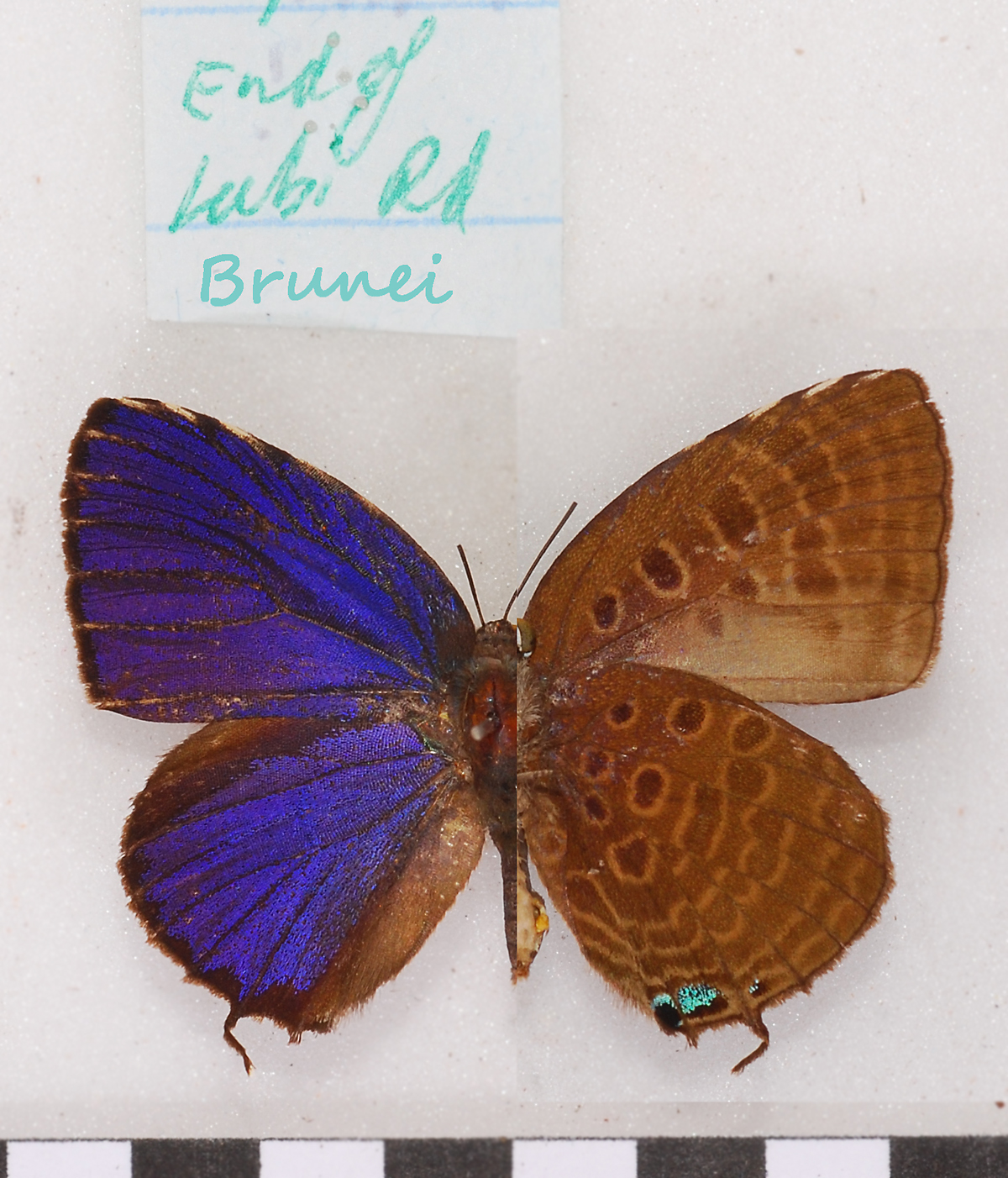

Scientific classification
- Kingdom: Animalia
- Phylum: Arthropoda
- Clade: Pancrustacea
- Class: Insecta
- Order: Lepidoptera
- Family: Lycaenidae
- Genus: Arhopala
- Species: A. vihara

Binomial name
- Arhopala vihara (C. Felder & R. Felder, 1860)

Synonyms
- Amblypodia vihara C. & R. Felder, 1860; Arhopala hirava Corbet, 1941

= Arhopala vihara =

Large spotted oakblue

Species of butterfly

Arhopala vihara, the large spotted oakblue, is a species of butterfly belonging to the lycaenid family described by (Cajetan Felder and Rudolf Felder) in 1860. It is found in Southeast Asia (Sumatra, Peninsular Malaya, Natuna, Borneo, Nias, Mergui, Langkawi, Pagi Island).

== Description ==
Upper surface in the male of a bright ultramarine colour with a violet reflection. Distal margin of the wings hardly 1 mm broad black, only in the anal portion of the hindwing and in the female broader. The bands beneath are dark, distinctly surrounded by light brown, on a golden brown ground.

== Subspecies ==
- Arhopala vihara vihara (Sumatra, Peninsular Malaysia, Natuna, Borneo, possibly Nias)
- Arhopala vihara hirava Corbet, 1941 (southern Burma, Mergui, Langkawi)
- Arhopala vihara pagia Corbet, 1941 (northern Pagi Island)
