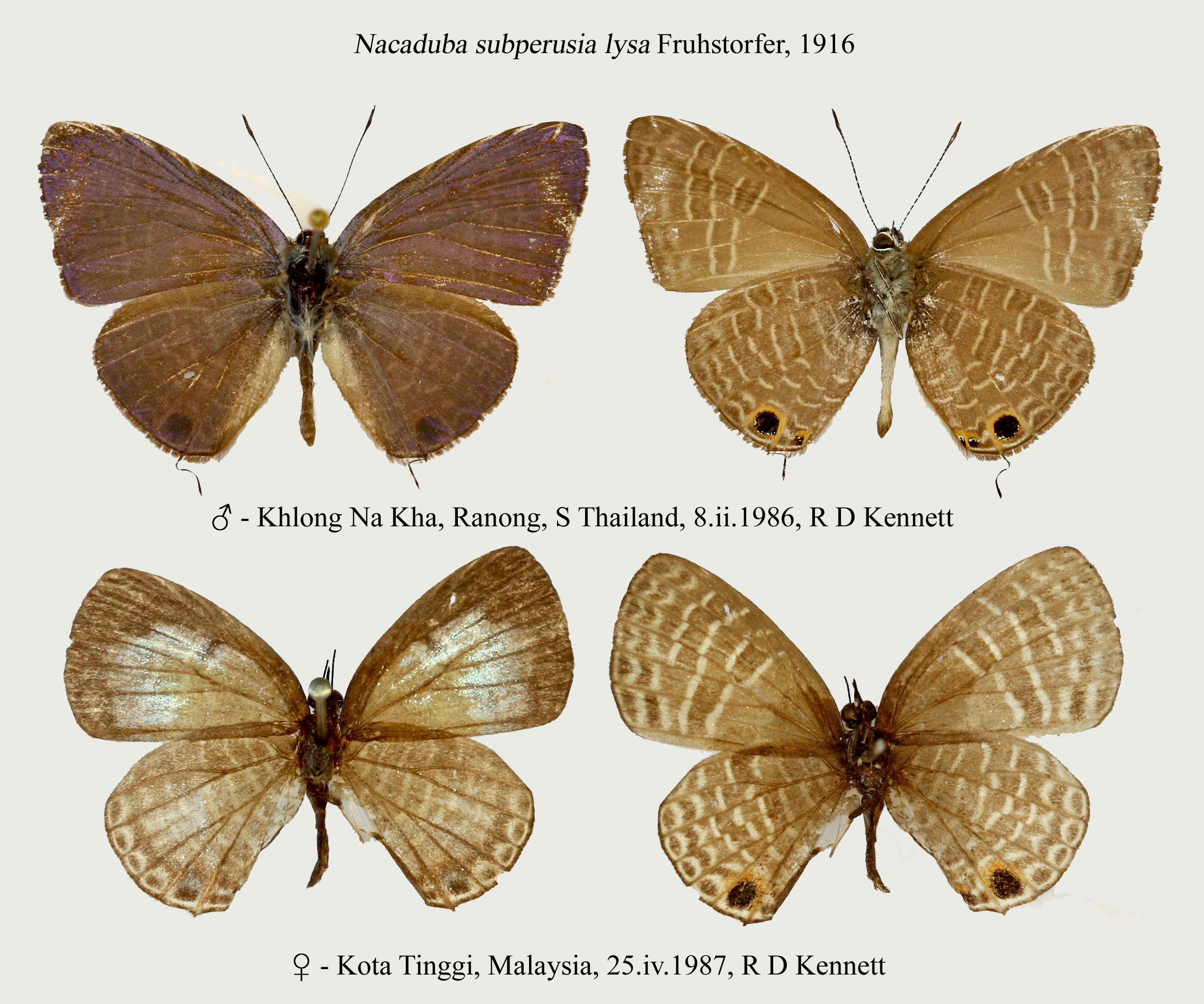
- Nacaduba subperusia lysa

Scientific classification
- Kingdom: Animalia
- Phylum: Arthropoda
- Clade: Pancrustacea
- Class: Insecta
- Order: Lepidoptera
- Family: Lycaenidae
- Genus: Nacaduba
- Species: N. subperusia

Binomial name
- Nacaduba subperusia (Snellen, 1896)

Synonyms
- Lycaena subperusia Snellen, 1896; Nacaduba pavana lysa Fruhstorfer, 1916; Nacaduba intricata Corbet, 1938

= Nacaduba subperusia =

Species of butterfly

Nacaduba subperusia, the violet 4-lineblue, is a butterfly in the family Lycaenidae. It was described by Pieter Cornelius Tobias Snellen in 1896. It is found in the Indomalayan realm.The upperside is violet-blue, while the underside ground colour is brown or greyish.The underside has white transverse lines, submarginal striae, post-discal and tornal spots. Identification requires examining the male genitalia

== Subspecies ==
- Nacaduba subperusia subperusia (Sulawesi)
- Nacaduba subperusia lysa Fruhstorfer, 1916 (Sumatra, Singapore, possibly Borneo)
- Nacaduba subperusia intricata Corbet, 1938 (Peninsular Malaysia)
- Nacaduba subperusia nadia Eliot, 1955 (Nicobars)
- Nacaduba subperusia paska Eliot, 1955 (Palawan, Philippines, Sulawesi, Sula, Maluku)
- Nacaduba subperusia martha Eliot, 1955 (Roon Island, West Irian to Papua, D'Entrecasteaux, Louisiades)
