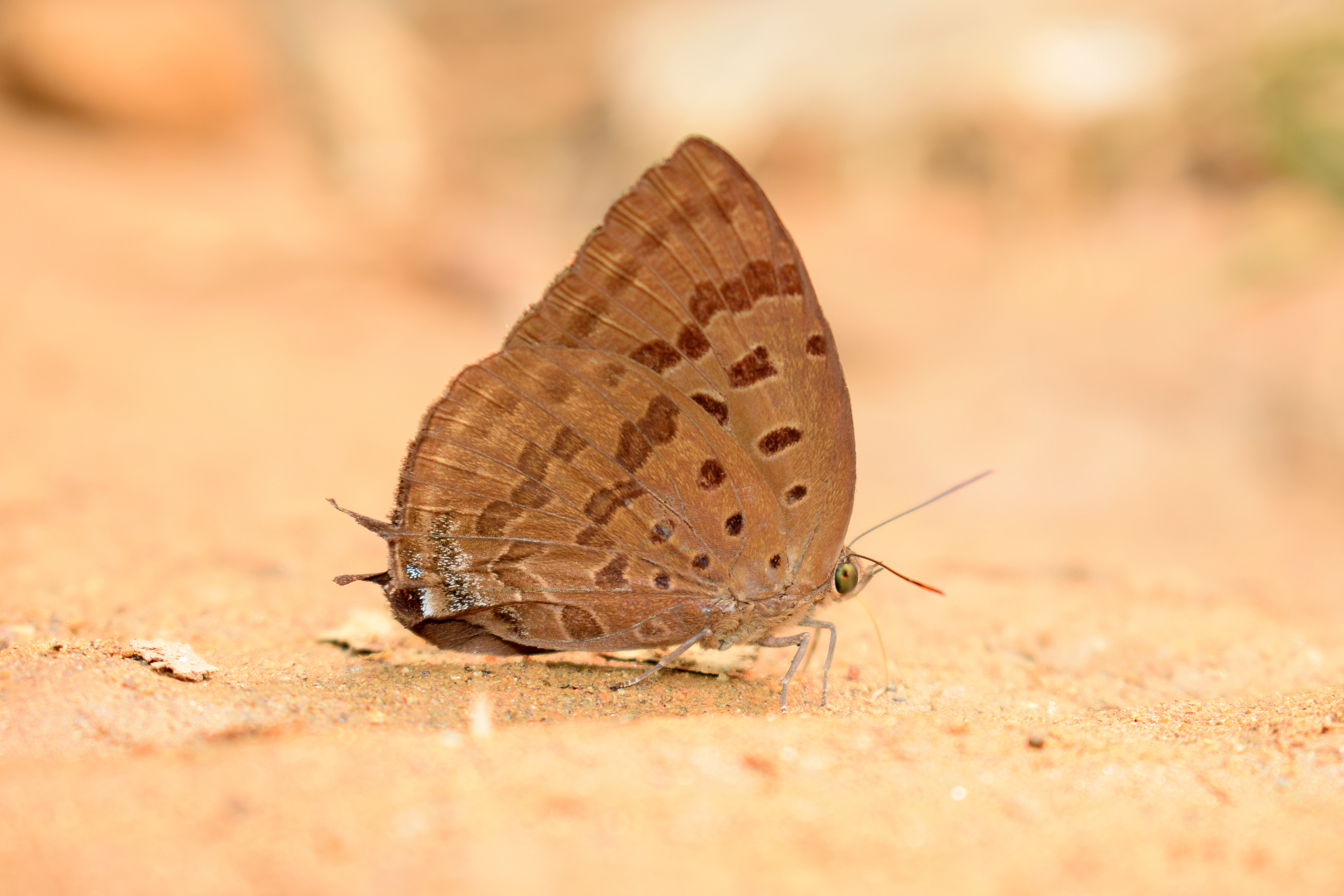

Scientific classification
- Kingdom: Animalia
- Phylum: Arthropoda
- Clade: Pancrustacea
- Class: Insecta
- Order: Lepidoptera
- Family: Lycaenidae
- Genus: Arhopala
- Species: A. silhetensis

Binomial name
- Arhopala silhetensis (Hewitson, 1862)

Synonyms
- Amblypodia silhetensis Hewitson, 1862

= Arhopala silhetensis =

Sylhet oakblue

Species of butterfly

Arhopala silhetensis, the Sylhet oakblue, (sometimes placed in Amblypodia) is a small butterfly found in India that belongs to the lycaenids or blues family. The species was first described by William Chapman Hewitson in 1862.

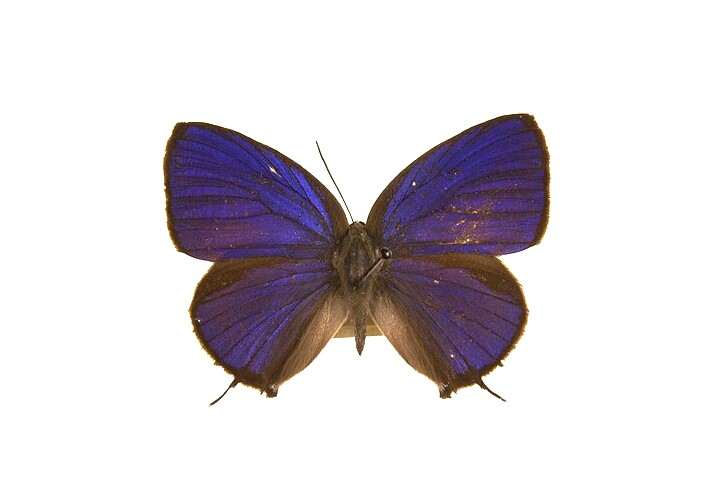
Female

== Description ==
Male forewing 25 mm., bright shining blue, border 1 mm.Female lighter blue, border 4 mm. Below somewhat ochreous brown, no purple wash. Above very similar to Arhopala malayica [now subspecies upper surface lilac-blue colour margined with black, the under-surface exhibits all the spots dark and distinct.The female has a broad black costal margin and distal margin], but easily discernible by the reduction of the marking beneath, where the spots in the forewing are almost obsolete and the submarginal band is only represented by a nebulous stripe]. The female is not unlike that of Arhopala eumolphus, but easily distinguishable by the blue colouring above and the less lustrous under surface.

== Subspecies ==
- A. s. silhetensis Sikkim, Assam, Manipur, Burma, Mergui, Thailand, ?Indo China
- A. s. adorea de Nicéville, 1890 Peninsular Malaya, Singapore, Sumatra, Borneo
- A. s. fundania Fruhstorfer, 1914 Java
- A. s. malayica Bethune-Baker, 1903 Philippines, Java?
- A. s. philippina (Hayashi, 1981)Philippines (Mindanao)

== Range in India ==
The butterfly occurs in India from Sikkim onto north Myanmar, and, from Karens to south Myanmar.

== Status ==
The species is considered rare.

== See also ==
- Lycaenidae
- List of butterflies of India (Lycaenidae)
