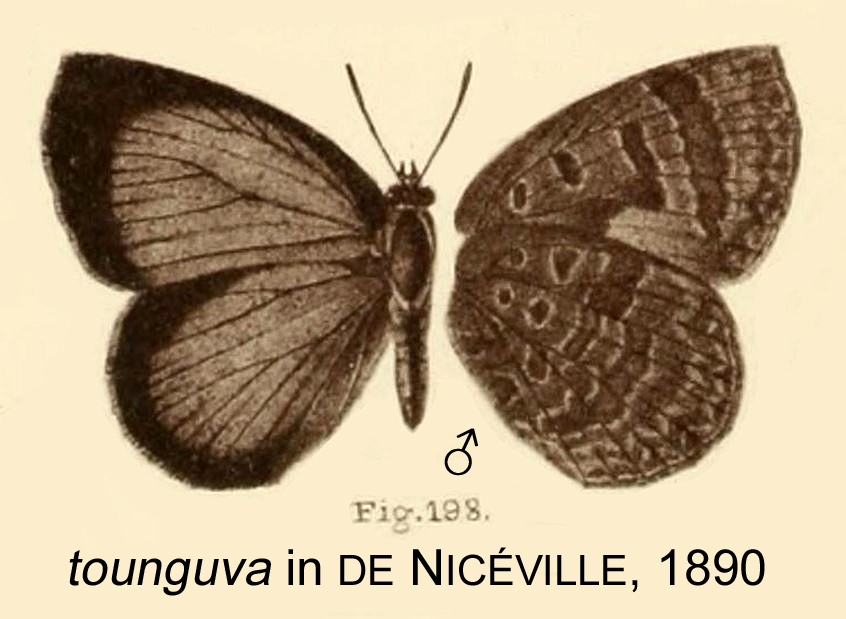
- Arhopala asinarus tounguva in de Niceville Butterflies of India, Burma and Ceylon.

Scientific classification
- Kingdom: Animalia
- Phylum: Arthropoda
- Clade: Pancrustacea
- Class: Insecta
- Order: Lepidoptera
- Family: Lycaenidae
- Genus: Arhopala
- Species: A. asinarus

Binomial name
- Arhopala asinarus Cajetan Felder and Rudolf Felder, 1865.

= Arhopala asinarus =

Species of butterfly

Arhopala asinarus or broad-banded oakblue, is a butterfly in the family Lycaenidae. It was described by Cajetan Felder and Rudolf Felder in 1865. It is found in the Indomalayan realm.

== Description ==
Male forewing 21 mm. dark shining blue, border 7 mm. wide at apex to 3 mm. wide at dorsum and 2mm. wide on hindwing. The verso is darker and may have a faint purple gloss. Female blue, border as in the male. tounguva Beneath very much like perissa, but the male above is not ultramarine but of a glaring violettish blue with an intense lilac gloss.

== Subspecies ==
- A. a. asinarus Burma, Thailand, Indo China
- A. a. tounguva (Grose-Smith, 1887) Burma (Karen Hills, Bassein, Rangoon)
