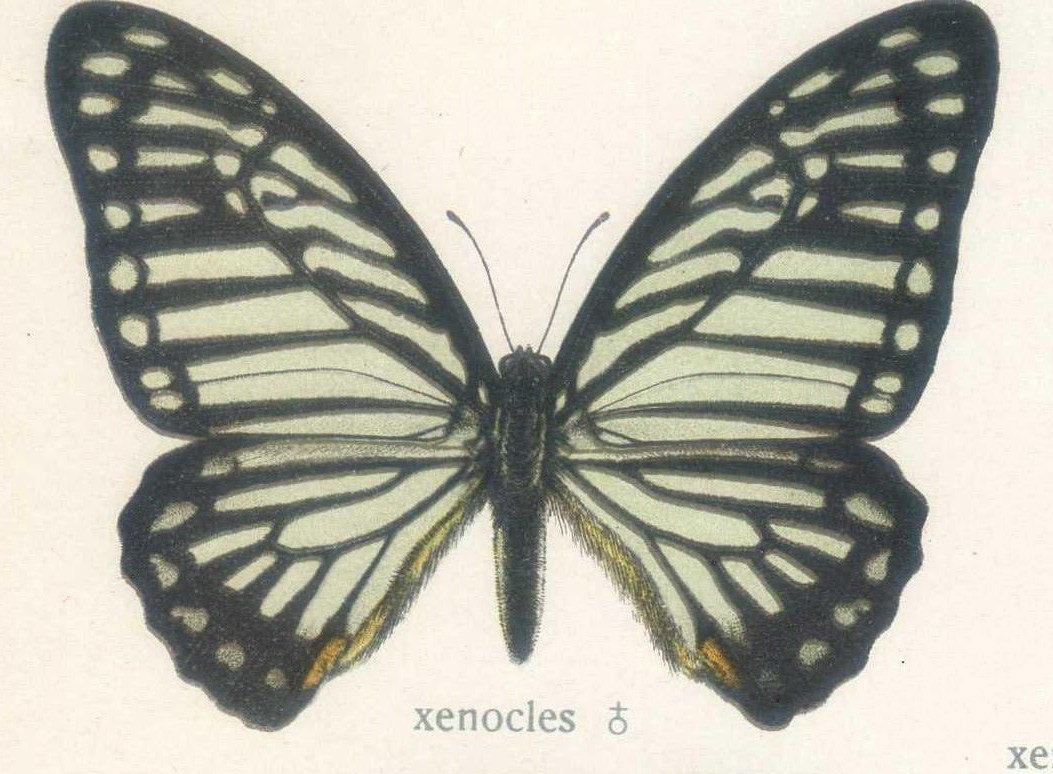
- Male in Adalbert Seitz's Macrolepidoptera of the World

Scientific classification
- Kingdom: Animalia
- Phylum: Arthropoda
- Clade: Pancrustacea
- Class: Insecta
- Order: Lepidoptera
- Family: Papilionidae
- Genus: Graphium
- Species: G. xenocles

Binomial name
- Graphium xenocles Cramer, 1775

= Graphium xenocles =

Great zebra

Species of butterfly

Graphium xenocles, the great zebra, is a swallowtail butterfly found in Southeast Asia which is common and not threatened.

== Subspecies ==
- G. x. xenocles Sikkim, Assam, Bhutan
- G. x. kephisos (Fruhstorfer, 1902) Burma - Vietnam
- G. x. lindos (Fruhstorfer, 1902) Thailand
- G. x xenoclides Fruhstorfer, 1902 Hainan, Five Finger Mts

== Description ==
Male upperside: black forewing with the following greenish or bluish-white streaks and spots: Cell with three transverse, very oblique, broad streaks and two elongate spots near apex; in the type as described the outer two of the three streaks coalescent; broad streaks from base in interspaces la to 3; a series of four rounded spots beyond apex of coll in interspaces 4, 5, 6 and 8, followed by five short streaks that are outwardly truncate or emarginate, in interspaces 4 to 8; lastly, a complete subterminal series of comparatively large rounded spots. Hindwing with similar greenish-white or bluish-white streaks and spots as follows: a broad curved streak in cell; broad streaks from base in interspaces 1 to 7, these streaks vary in length but invariably leave a comparatively broad margin of the ground colour beyond; the streak in interface 7 white, that in interspace 1, and in some specimens in interspace 2 also, with a large yellow spot beyond the apex; lastly, a subterminal series of spots, some or all of which may be absent, but when present the posterior three always somewhat lunular. Underside: fuliginous brown, paler towards the apical area of forewing; markings as on the upperside, but duller and less clearly defined. Antennae, head, thorax and abdomen black; two spots on the head, the thorax and abdomen laterally, white; beneath: the thorax and abdomen white, the latter with a medial and a lateral narrow stripe.

Female similar to the male with similar markings; those on the hindwing often vary in width more than they do in the males; the ground colour also of the hindwing is generally of a chestnut red, not black or fuliginous.

Karl Jordan in Seitz (pages 105) provides a description differentiating xenocles from nearby taxa and discussing some forms.

== Biology ==
Mimic of Parantica melaneus .

== See also ==
- Papilionidae
- List of butterflies of India
- List of butterflies of India (Papilionidae)
