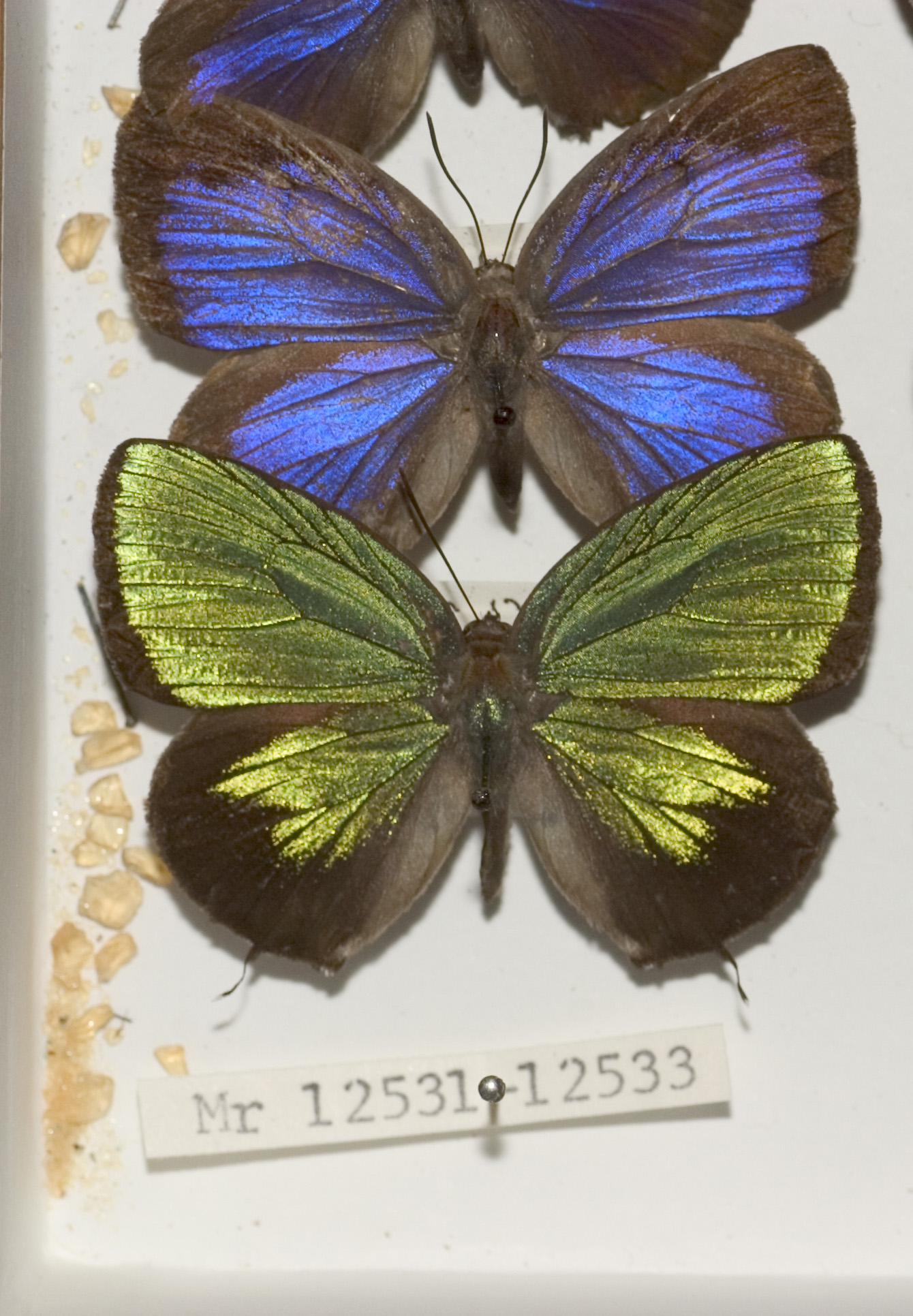
- Arhopala eumolphus maxwelli, male (top) and female
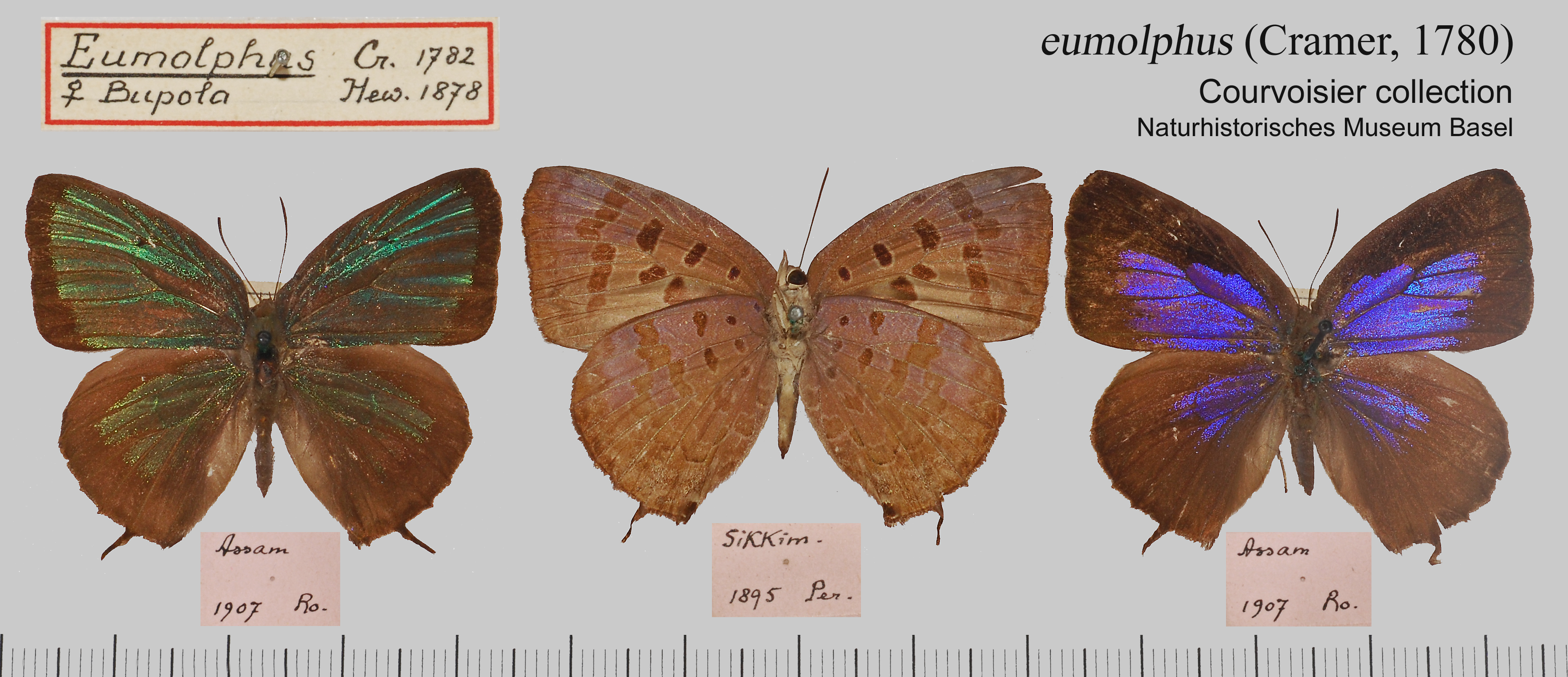
- Arhopala eumolphus eumolphus, Courvoisier Collection, Basel

Scientific classification
- Kingdom: Animalia
- Phylum: Arthropoda
- Clade: Pancrustacea
- Class: Insecta
- Order: Lepidoptera
- Family: Lycaenidae
- Genus: Arhopala
- Species: A. eumolphus

Binomial name
- Arhopala eumolphus (Cramer, [1780])

= Arhopala eumolphus =

Green oakblue

Species of butterfly

Arhopala eumolphus, the green oakblue, is a lycaenid butterfly found in the Indomalayan realm. The species was first described by Pieter Cramer in 1780.

== Description ==
A. eumolphus is recognisable by the males, which exhibit a bright green lustre. However, it has not yet been determined whether some of these green forms differ sufficiently from each other to be classified as separate species. Typical specimens are from Northern India and are observed during the rainy season. The male is characterized by an abundant emerald-green with a golden lustre, while the jet-black marginal band is narrow on the forewing and broad on the hindwing. The female, on the other hand, is dark-red brown above with a violet-blue reflection in the basal portion; the hindwing has a small tail. In tagore Fruhst., from Assam, the male is smaller, but it has a broader black marginal band than specimens from Sikkim. In the female of this form, the blue colour above is darker, but it extends further across the wing.

== Range ==
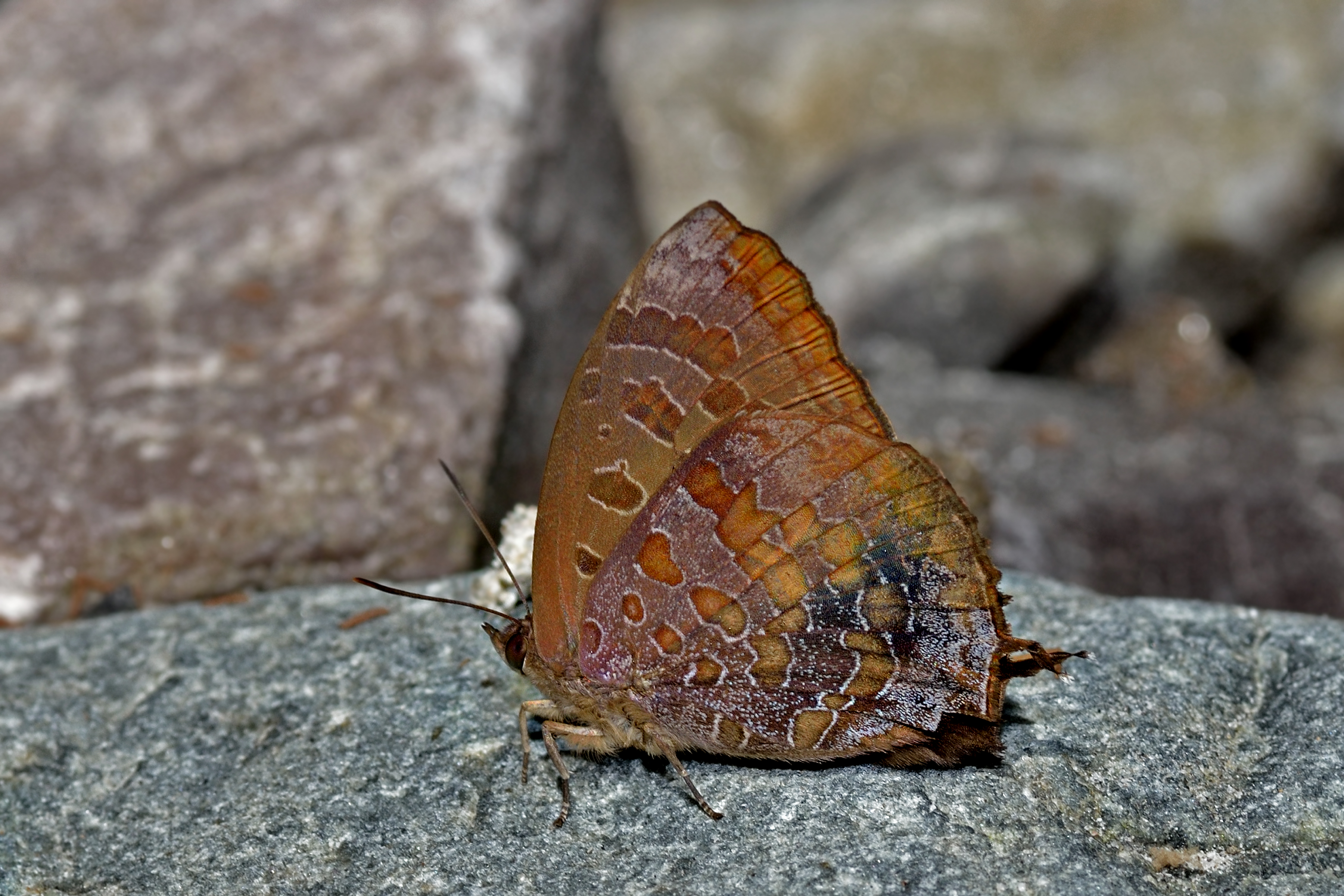

The butterfly is mostly seen in India, ranging from West Bengal and Sikkim to Arunachal Pradesh, and is also found in Nepal, Bhutan, Bangladesh, and Myanmar. It is also located in Hainan, Southeast Asia, Sumatra, Java and Palawan.

== Subspecies ==
- A. e. eumolphus Sikkim, Assam, Myanmar, Thailand, Hainan
- A. e. maxwelli (Distant, 1885) Mergui, Myanmar, southern Thailand, Peninsular Malaya, Sumatra, Borneo, Bangka - much broader, rounder wings; here the blue reflection of the female is still further expanded, almost across the whole surface of the wings.
- A. e. adonias (Hewitson, 1862) Java - shows a particularly grey-tinged ground colour of the under surface, on which metallic anal spots show a silvery gloss; the female is above lighter blue
- A. e. caesarion Fruhstorfer, 1914 Sumatra - female smaller than specimens from Malacca, and the female above exhibits a broader dark marginal band.
- A. e. aristomachus Fruhstorfer, 1914 Palawan - female very light blue with a broad dark marginal band; beneath with dark, contrasting longitudinal bands.
