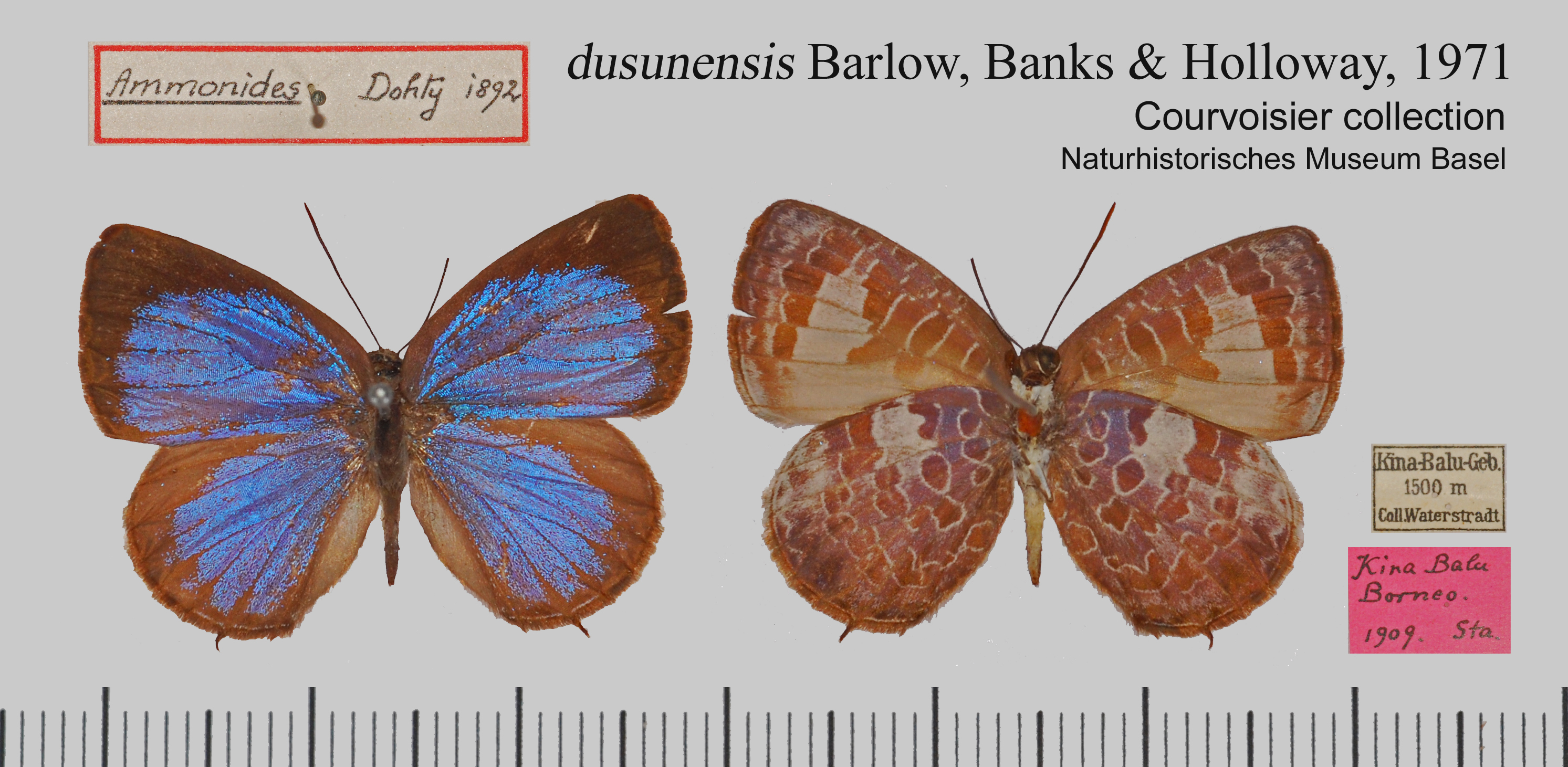
- Arhopala paraganesa dusunensis from the Courvoisier Collection, Basel, Switzerland

Scientific classification
- Kingdom: Animalia
- Phylum: Arthropoda
- Clade: Pancrustacea
- Class: Insecta
- Order: Lepidoptera
- Family: Lycaenidae
- Genus: Arhopala
- Species: A. paraganesa

Binomial name
- Arhopala paraganesa (de Nicéville, 1882)

Synonyms
- Amblypodia paraganesa de Nicéville, 1882; Acesina paraganesa zephyretta Doherty, 1891; Arhopala medava Corbet, 1941; Arhopala ammon hammon Fruhstorfer, 1914; Panchala paraganesa tomokoae Hayashi, 1976

= Arhopala paraganesa =

Dusky bushblue

Species of butterfly

Arhopala paraganesa, the dusky bushblue, is a butterfly in the family Lycaenidae. It was described by Lionel de Nicéville in 1882. It is found in the Indomalayan realm.

== Description ==
As the name indicates, it is above already very similar to ganesa (Vol. I. the above violettish blue with a broad black marginal band; beneath the spots and bands are deep chocolate brown, encircled with white, and situate on a dull earth-brown ground which is whitish in some places. — zephyretta Doh. represents the species in Assam; here both sexes are above quite blackish-brown, only in the area of the discal cell there is lustrous bluish colouring.

== Subspecies ==
- A. p. paraganesa (northern India, Nepal, Sikkim)
- A. p. zephyretta (Doherty, 1891) (Assam, northern Burma, central Burma, western Thailand)
- A. p. mendava Corbet, 1941 (Peninsular Malaysia)
- A. p. hammon Fruhstorfer, 1914 (Java)
- A. p. dusunensis Barlow, Banks & Holloway, 1971 (Borneo)
- A. p. tomokoae (Hayashi, 1976) (Philippines: Palawan)
- A. p. felipa Lamas, 2008 (Philippines: Palawan)
- A. p. insula Lamas, 2008 (Hainan)
