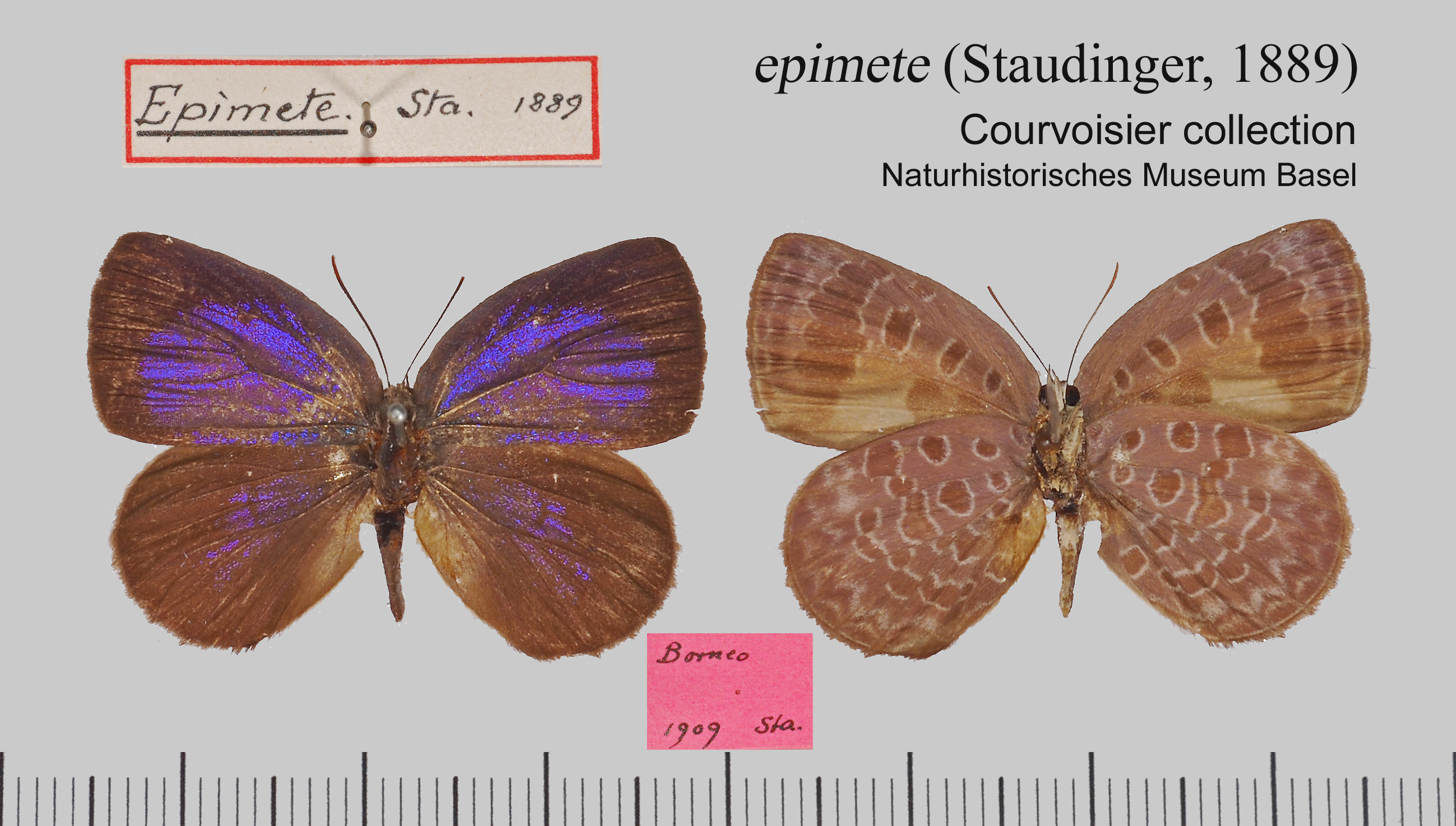
- From the Courvoisier Collection, Basel

Scientific classification
- Kingdom: Animalia
- Phylum: Arthropoda
- Clade: Pancrustacea
- Class: Insecta
- Order: Lepidoptera
- Family: Lycaenidae
- Genus: Arhopala
- Species: A. epimete

Binomial name
- Arhopala epimete (Staudinger, 1889)

Synonyms
- Amblypodia epimete Staudinger, 1889; Arhopala duessa Doherty, 1889; Arhopala suedas Corbet, 1941

= Arhopala epimete =

Violetdisc oakblue

Species of butterfly

Arhopala epimete, the violetdisc oakblue, is a species of butterfly belonging to the lycaenid family described by Otto Staudinger in 1889. It is found in Southeast Asia (Borneo, Palawan, Burma, Mergui, Langkawi, Peninsular Malaya and Sumatra).

== Description ==
Has a lustrous blue forewing with a broad dark costal margin and distal margin, the hindwing being blackish-brown, in the male with hardly any blue, in the female without blue. Beneath somewhat like acron. duessa Doh., from Tenasserim, is beneath almost the same, but above the blue gloss on the forewing is more glaring.

== Subspecies ==
- Arhopala epimete epimete (Borneo, Palawan)
- Arhopala epimete duessa Doherty, 1889 (southern Burma, Mergui, Langkawi)
- Arhopala epimete suedas Corbet, 1941 (Peninsular Malaysia, possibly Sumatra)
- Arhopala epimete magindana Osada, 1987 (Philippines: north-eastern Mindanao)
