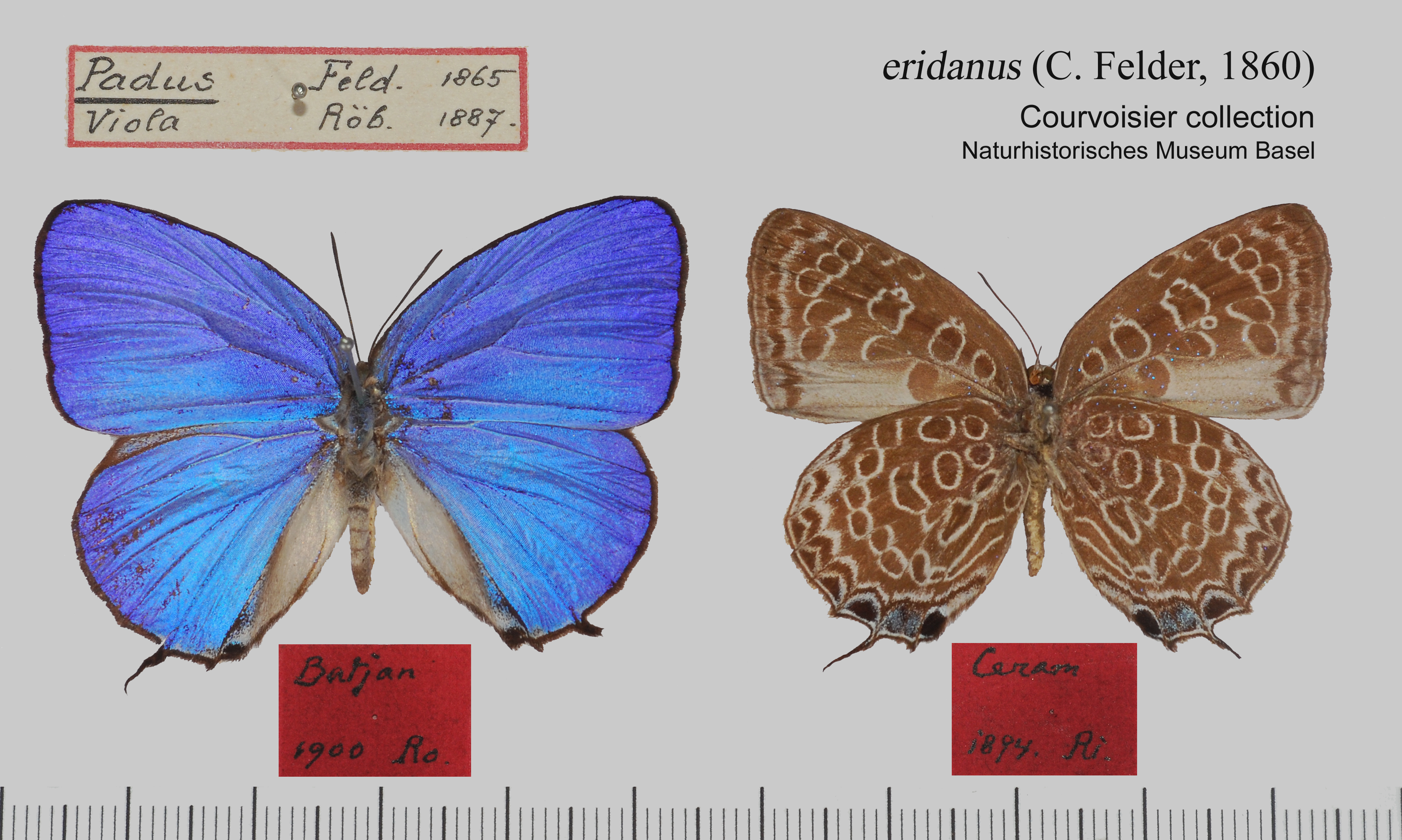
- From the Courvoisier Collection, Basel, Switzerland
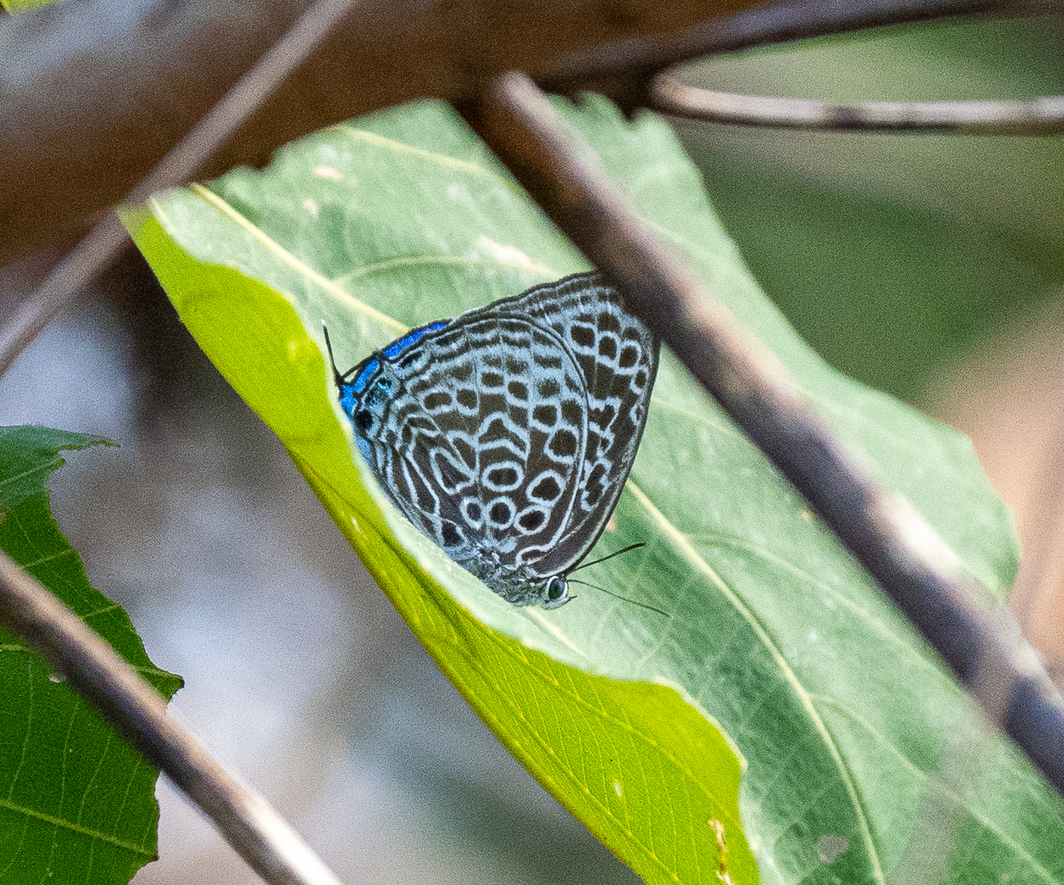

Scientific classification
- Kingdom: Animalia
- Phylum: Arthropoda
- Clade: Pancrustacea
- Class: Insecta
- Order: Lepidoptera
- Family: Lycaenidae
- Genus: Arhopala
- Species: A. eridanus

Binomial name
- Arhopala eridanus (C. Felder, 1860)

Synonyms
- Amblypodia eridanus Felder, 1860; Amblypodia polita Röber, 1887; Amblypodia elfeta Hewitson, 1869; Amblypodia viola Röber, 1887; Amblypodia eridanus var. dilutior Staudinger, 1889; Arhopala padus itama Ribbe, 1926; Arhopala padus C. & R. Felder, [1865]

= Arhopala eridanus =

Species of butterfly

Arhopala eridanus is a butterfly in the family Lycaenidae. It was described by Cajetan Felder in 1860. It is found in the Indomalayan realm.

== Description ==
A. eridanus Fldr.is not dissimilar to camdeo, but much smaller. In the male the brightening in the disc of the forewing is not white, but only somewhat lighter sky-blue. Beneath the postmedian bands are broken up into single contiguous rings. ab. dilutior Stgr.,[now subspecies] from Palawan, has in the female a somewhat larger light area in the disc of the forewing, but the male is said not to differ from Amboina males The species varies in the colouring beneath being sometimes more red brown and sometimes more dark brown, whereas the marking remains constant.

== Subspecies ==
- A. e. eridanus (Ambon, Serang)
- A. e. elfeta (Hewitson, 1869) (Sula Island, Banggai)
- A. e. dilutior (Staudinger, 1889) (Palawan)
- A. e. lewara Ribbe, 1926 (Sulawesi)
- A. e. padus C. & R. Felder, [1865] (Halmahera)
- A. e. davalma Schröder & Treadaway, 2006 (Philippines)
