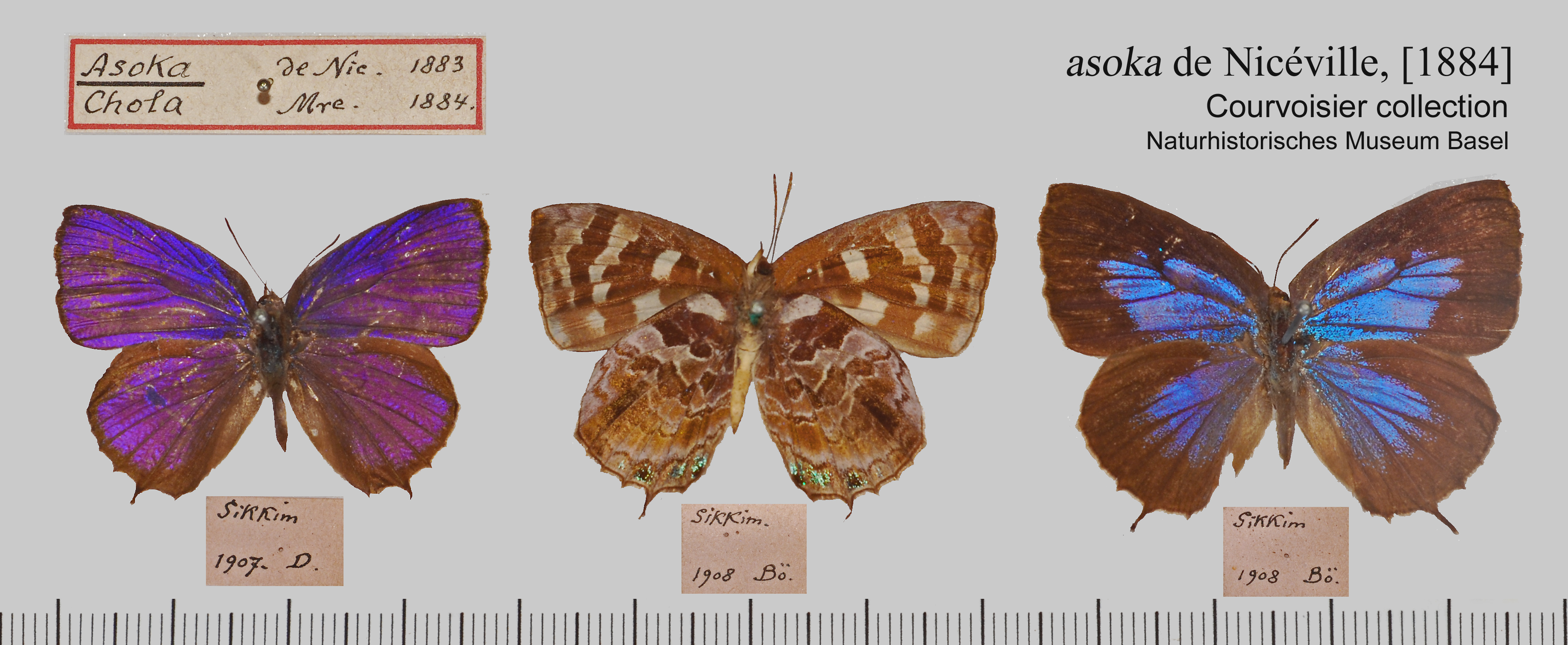
- From the Courvoisier Collection, Basel, Switzerland

Scientific classification
- Kingdom: Animalia
- Phylum: Arthropoda
- Class: Insecta
- Order: Lepidoptera
- Family: Lycaenidae
- Genus: Flos
- Species: F. asoka

Binomial name
- Flos asoka de Nicéville, [1884]

Synonyms
- Nilasera asoka de Nicéville, [1884]; Satadra chola Moore, 1884; Arhopala asoka vaya Fruhstorfer, 1914

= Flos asoka =

Species of butterfly

Flos asoka or Spangled Plushblue, is a butterfly in the family Lycaenidae. It was described by Lionel de Nicéville in 1884. It is found in the Indomalayan realm (Sikkim, Assam, Burma, Thailand - South China and Hong Kong).
