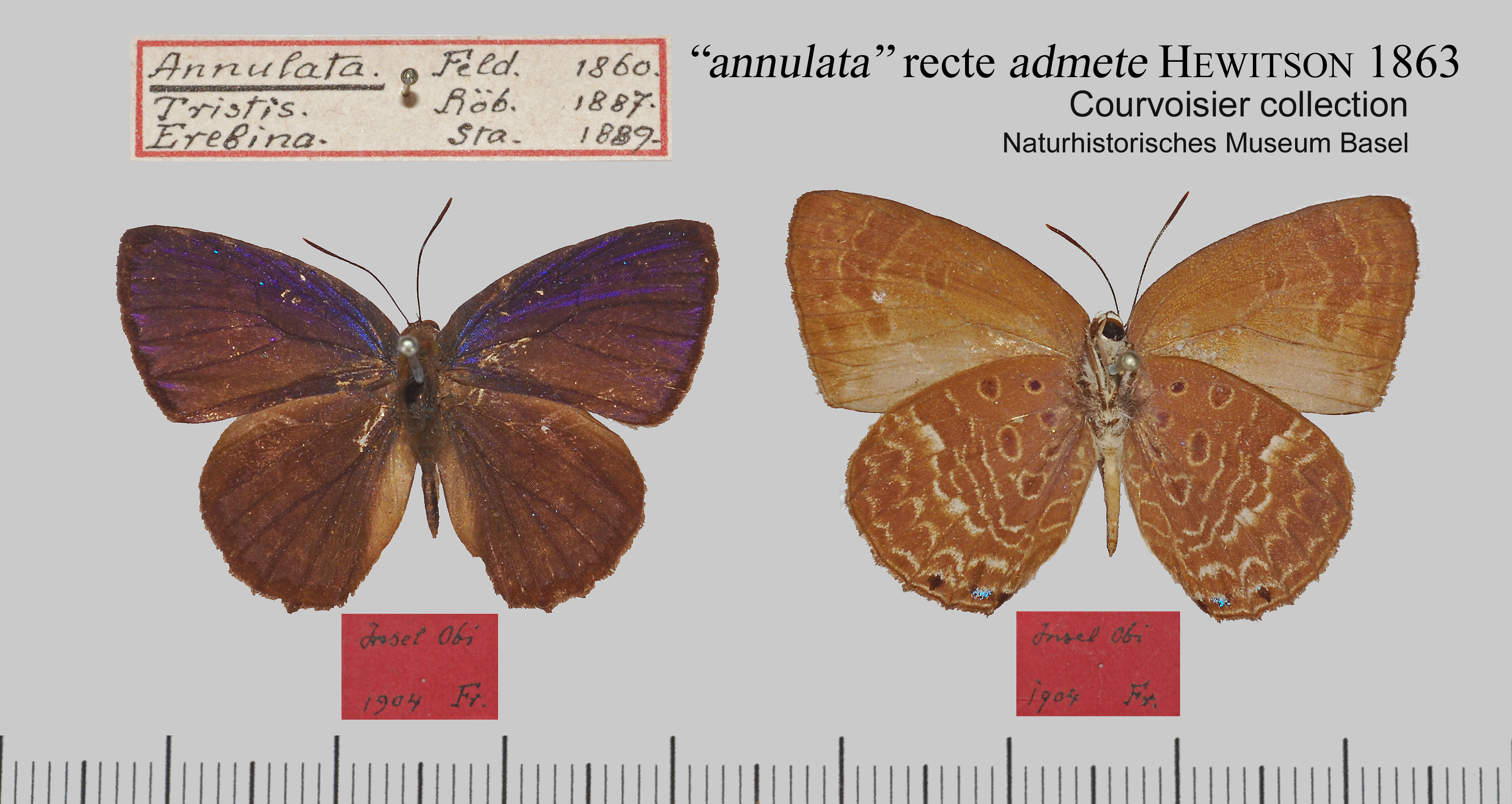
- From the Courvoisier Collection, Basel, Switzerland

Scientific classification
- Kingdom: Animalia
- Phylum: Arthropoda
- Clade: Pancrustacea
- Class: Insecta
- Order: Lepidoptera
- Family: Lycaenidae
- Genus: Arhopala
- Species: A. annulata

Binomial name
- Arhopala annulata (Felder, 1860)

Synonyms
- Amblypodia annulata Felder, 1860; Amblypodia tristis Röber, 1887; Amblypodia erebina Staudinger, 1889; Narathura schroederi Hayashi, 1981

= Arhopala annulata =

Species of butterfly

Arhopala annulata is a butterfly in the family Lycaenidae. It was described by Cajetan Felder in 1860. It is found in the Australasian realm (Buru, Ambon) and in the Indomalayan realm (Palawan).

== Description ==
annulata approximates viola in size and under surface, but above it is brown, the male with some blue scaling hardly extending to the centre of the wing. The female is above somewhat bluer, but likewise with a very broad black marginal band. Beneath the chains of spots are somewhat more irregular.- tristis Rob., from Bangkei, is above particularly scantily irrorated with blue, but Bethune-Baker states that this irroration disappears, if the insect flies for a long time, which fact would not speak in favour of separating a Bangkei-race as a geographical form.
