= RPC =

RPC may refer to:

== Science and technology ==
- Rational polynomial coefficient
- Reactive Plastic Curtain, a carbon-dioxide-absorbing device used in some rebreather breathing sets
- Regional Playback Control, a regional lockout technology for DVDs
- Remote procedure call, an inter-process communication technique in networked computing
  - Open Network Computing Remote Procedure Call, IETF RPC, a.k.a. "Sun RPC"
  - DCE/RPC, for Distributed Computing Environment by Open Software Foundation
  - JSON-RPC, a "JSON encoded" variant
  - XML-RPC, an "XML encoded" variant
- Resistive plate chamber, a simple type of particle detector used in experimental particle physics
- Reversed-phase chromatography, a chemistry technique
- Acorn Risc PC
- Rocket Pod Container, the interchangeable containers used to transport and launch missiles for use with the M270 Multiple Launch Rocket System
- Rotary phase converter, an electrical machine that converts power from one polyphase system (including frequency) to another, converting through rotary motion.

== Organizations ==
- RPC Group, UK packaging company
- Recorded Picture Company, a British film-production company
- Reformed Presbyterian Church (disambiguation), denominations following a Presbyterian form of Christianity
- Regent's Park College, a permanent private hall of Oxford University
- RPC Fort (Research and Production Company Fort), a Ukrainian weapons manufacturer
- Research Policy Council, the executive management team for the Congressional Research Service, a division of the Library of Congress
- Royal Parks Constabulary, a police force which patrolled the eight Royal Parks of London and a number of other locations in London, 1974–2004
- RPC, Inc., a North American oil services business
- RPC, a Brazilian television network affiliated with TV Globo in the state of Paraná

== Law and politics ==
- Reports of Patent, Design and Trademark Cases, a case-law journal published by the Oxford University Press on behalf of the UK Intellectual Property Office
- Revolutionary Policy Committee, a faction within UK Independent Labour Party during the 1930s
- Reynolds Porter Chamberlain, a law firm based in London
- Revised Penal Code of the Philippines
- Rules of Professional Conduct, relating to U.S. lawyers' ethical rules, see American Bar Association Model Rules of Professional Conduct

== Sports ==
- Russian Paralympic Committee
  - RPC, the IPC code used for Russian Olympic Committee athletes:
    - Russian Paralympic Committee athletes at the 2020 Summer Paralympics
    - Russian Paralympic Committee athletes at the 2022 Winter Paralympics

== Other uses ==
- Recurrent pyogenic cholangitis, a medical condition
- Red Paraguaya de Comunicación, a TV operator in Paraguay
- Rei Publicae Constituendae, part of the title of the members of the Second Triumvirate, appearing on Roman coins
- République populaire de Chine, República popular China, República popular da China, the French, Spanish and Portuguese names for the People's Republic of China
- RPC, a Panamanian national television network
