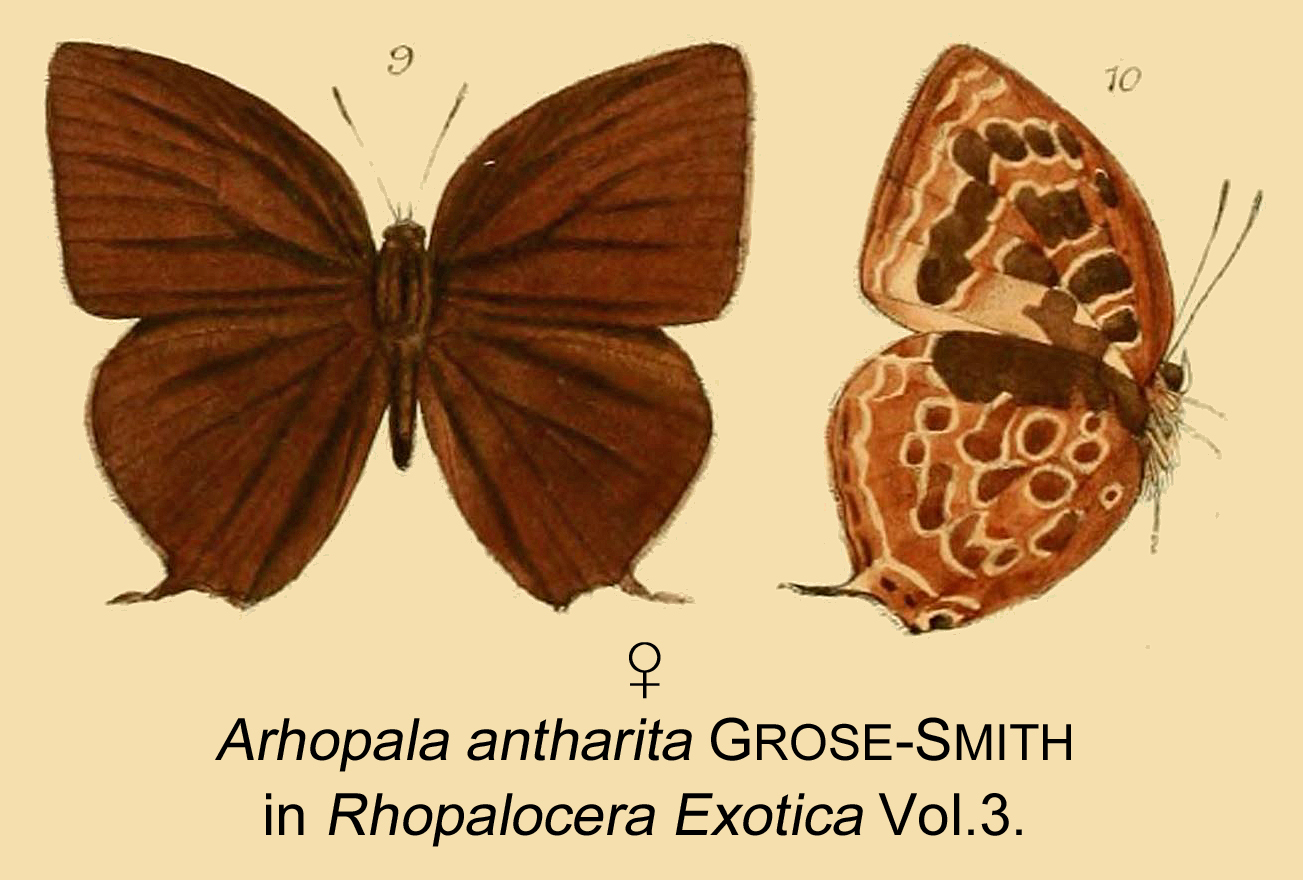

Scientific classification
- Kingdom: Animalia
- Phylum: Arthropoda
- Clade: Pancrustacea
- Class: Insecta
- Order: Lepidoptera
- Family: Lycaenidae
- Genus: Arhopala
- Species: A. antharita

Binomial name
- Arhopala antharita Grose-Smith, 1894

Synonyms
- Amblypodia hyacinthus Röber, 1931

= Arhopala antharita =

Species of butterfly

Arhopala antharita is a butterfly in the family Lycaenidae. It was described by Henley Grose-Smith in 1894. It is found in New Guinea.

Seitz - A female of this species [Arhopala nobilis] the habitat of which is unknown and which has an entirely brown upper surface has been named antharita Sm.

== Original description ==
Female. — Upperside -. both wings rich bronze-coloured brown, suffused with purple in certain lights. Underside: somewhat resembles A. anunda Hew. [ Arhopala anthelus anunda (Hewitson, 1869 ] Anterior wings with two spots crossing the cell, that nearest the base oval, the other reniform; a large quadrate spot at the end of the cell, the inner and outer edges of which are undulated; an oblong spot above it, near the cost a; a subovate spot between the two lowest median nervules at their junction with the disco-cellular nervule, and a large broad V-shaped spot below the cell; the disc is crossed by a broad band of spots, the four uppermost placed very obliquely, the others nearly vertical; an indistinct broad band on the outer margin. Posterior wings with a round spot near the base below the costal nervure, and two very large patches beyond, the outermost of which extends from the costal margin over the interspace between the first and second subcostal nervules, the other spots nearly as in A. inunda; a few dark bars a little before the outer margin, and a dark velvety spot above the anal angle, crowned with a few bluish grey scales; all the spots and markings on both wings are brown, margined on each side with pale pinkish brown rings; the ground colour is paler pinkish brown than the spots, except the space below the lowest median nervule, and the inner margin of the anterior wings, which is greyish brown.

Expanse of wings : nearly 2 inches.

One specimen only.

The underside has a strong superficial resemblance to A. anunda, but the very large subcostal brown spots on the posterior wings at once distinguish it from that species, while on the upperside it bears no resemblance to it.

== Subspecies ==
- A. a. antharita (West Irian: Humboldt Bay)
- A. a. hyacinthus (Röber, 1931) (West Irian: Eilanden R., Oetakwa R.)
