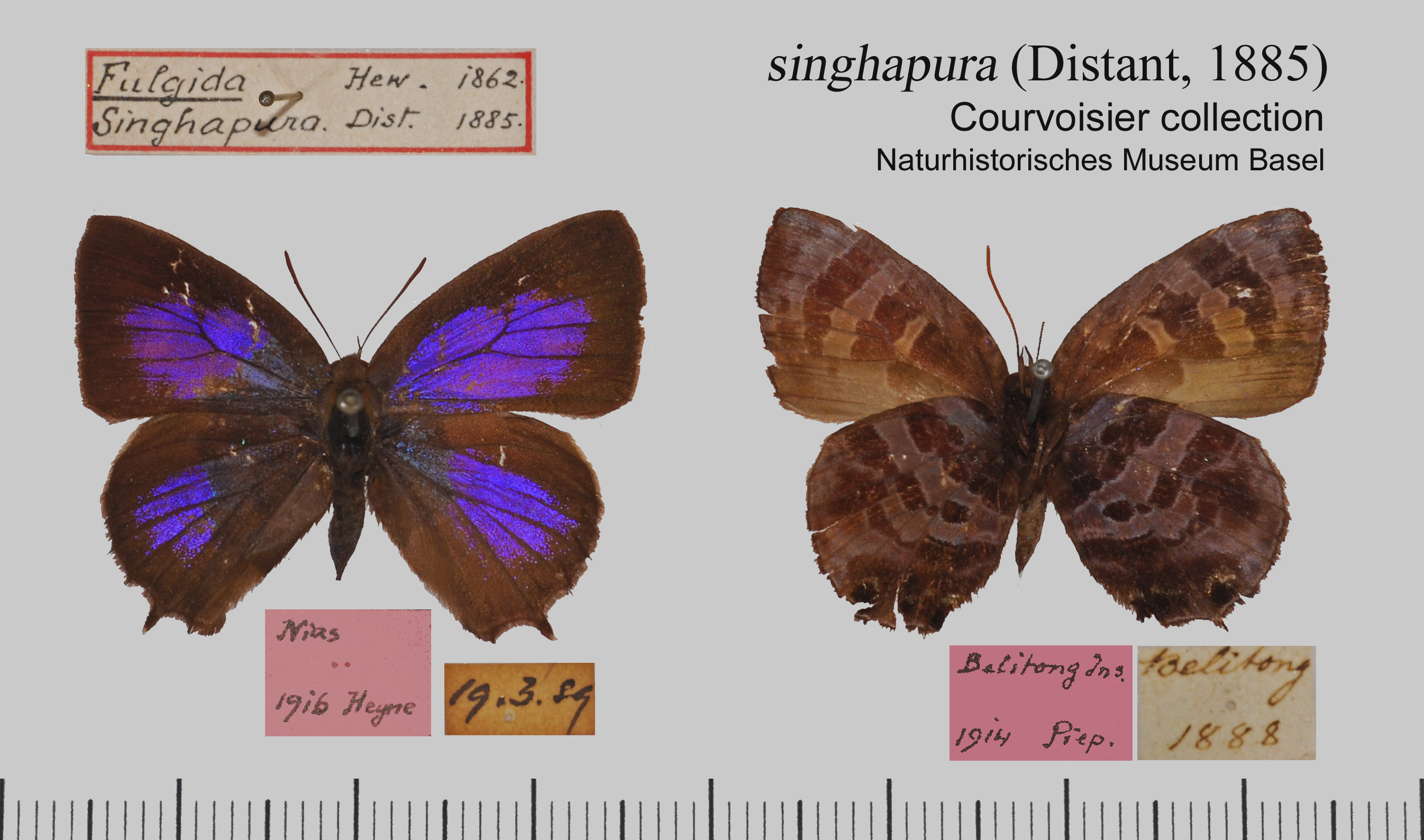
- F. f. singhapura from the Courvoisier Collection, Basel, Switzerland

Scientific classification
- Kingdom: Animalia
- Phylum: Arthropoda
- Class: Insecta
- Order: Lepidoptera
- Family: Lycaenidae
- Genus: Flos
- Species: F. fulgida

Binomial name
- Flos fulgida (Hewitson, 1863

Synonyms
- Arhopala fulgida (Hewitson, 1863); Amblypodia fulgida

= Flos fulgida =

Shining plushblue

Species of butterfly

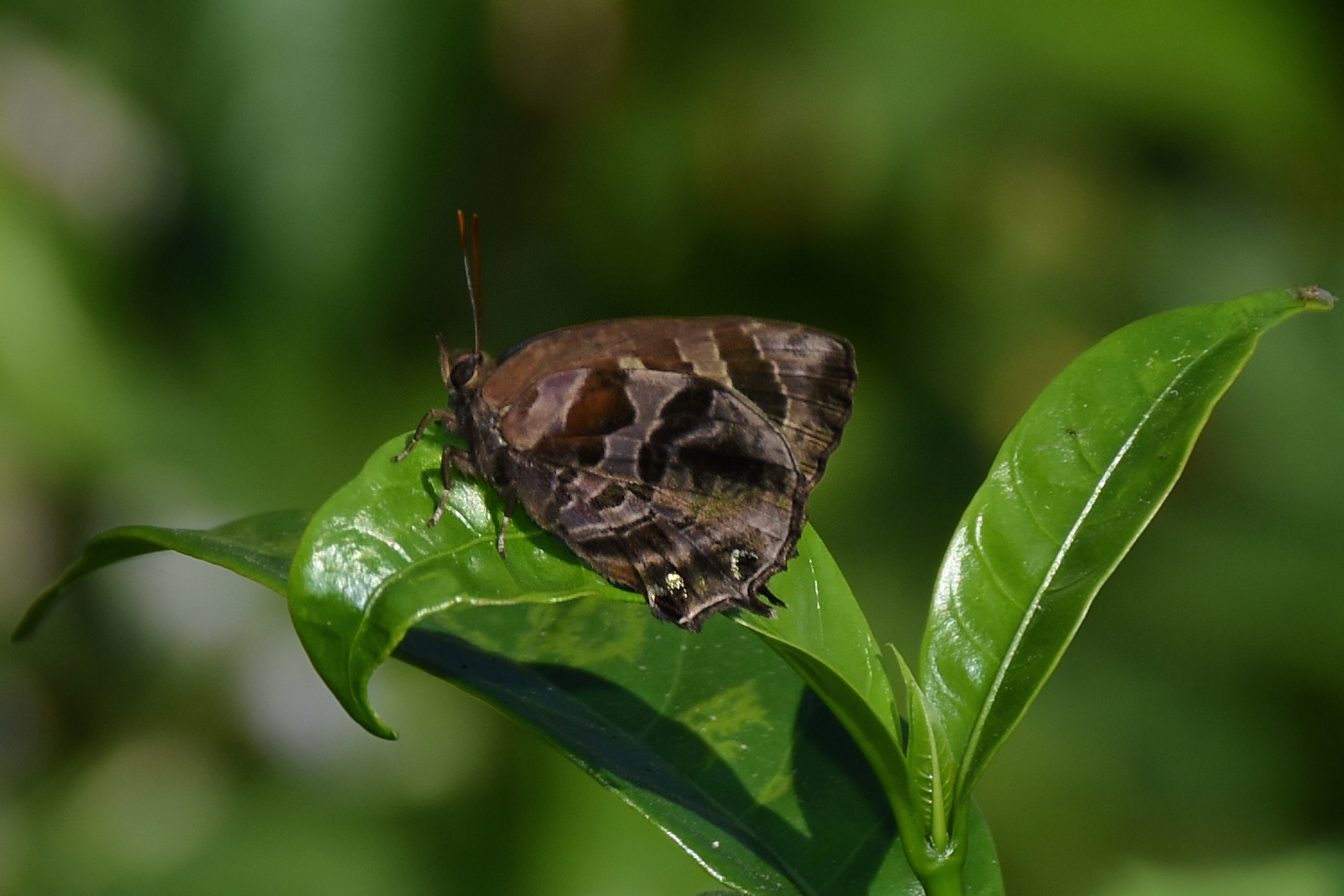
Close wing position of Flos fulgida (Hewitson, (1863)) – Shining Plushblue

Flos fulgida, the shining plushblue, is a species of lycaenid or blue butterfly found in the Indomalayan realm, including India. The species was first described by William Chapman Hewitson in 1863. It is tailed. The underhind dark basal area is continued as a band to the mid-costa.

== Subspecies ==
- F. f. fulgida Sikkim, Assam – Myanmar, Thailand, Laos
- F. f. singhapura (Distant, 1885) Peninsular Malaya, Singapore, Sumatra, Java, Borneo
- F. f. zilana (Fruhstorfer, 1900) Philippines (Basilan, Mindoro)
