= Courvoisier's law =

Clinical sign relating to the gallbladder

Courvoisier's law (also known as Courvoisier's sign or Courvoisier–Terrier's sign, or Courvoisier syndrome) states that a painless palpably enlarged gallbladder accompanied with mild jaundice is unlikely to be caused by gallstones. Usually, the term is used to describe the physical examination finding of the right-upper quadrant of the abdomen. This sign implicates possible malignancy of the gallbladder or pancreas and the swelling is unlikely due to gallstones.

This observation is best explained as a matter of the gradual increase in gallbladder distention that occurs secondary to chronic processes versus the abrupt increase in gallbladder pressure observed in acute processes. Courvoisier's sign occurs due to the gradual (chronic) nature of the obstruction caused by cancer (e.g. pancreatic, often located in pancreatic head, cholangiocarcinoma, etc.), which gradually causes biliary back-pressure and gradually distends the gallbladder over time, without causing acute damage, thus without causing pain. Conversely, gallstones cause obstruction of the biliary tree in a more abrupt (acute) nature when the gallstone becomes suddenly lodged somewhere along the biliary tree, blocking the passage of bile. This process causes the gallbladder to distend as it contracts against an abruptly blocked/higher pressure biliary tree, resulting in acute inflammation of the gallbladder (acute cholecystitis) and right upper quadrant abdominal pain (i.e., not Courvoisier's sign). Fibrosis of the gallbladder is another chronic process that occurs due to repeated acute inflammation (i.e., chronic cholecystitis), resulting in a shrunken, fibrotic (therefore hard), and calcified gallbladder ("porcelain gallbladder"), which typically will not present with Courvoisier's sign and is diagnosed with imaging.

Ludwig Georg Courvoisier's original observations, published in Germany in 1890, were not originally cited as a 'law', and no mention of malignancy or pain (tenderness) was made. These points are commonly misquoted or confused in the medical literature.

== Exceptions ==
Exceptions to Courvoisier's law imply that a stone is responsible for jaundice and a non-tender, palpable gall bladder. Typically gall bladder stones form slowly which allow time for the gall bladder to become tender. The exceptions to the law are stones that dislodge and acutely block the duct distally to the hepatic/cystic duct junction:

1. Double gallstones with one falling and blocking the common bile duct (responsible for jaundice) and one at the cystic duct (palpable non-tender gallbladder results from precisely a mucocele of the fibrotic gallbladder)

Cholangiocarcinoma, Klatskin tumors, ascariasis, or recurrent pyogenic cholangitis are not exceptions to the law because they all fall under it. For example, in the case of recurrent pyogenic cholangitis complicated by calcium bilirubinate stone dislodging to the common bile duct causing a distended gallbladder by back pressure. (Where formation of stones are not strictly in gallbladder, hence not fibrotic, but in the intrahepatic bile ducts). To reiterate, the law simply says that jaundice and non-tender, palpable gall bladders are caused by other things than chronic bile gallstone formation.

The law does not say that these symptoms automatically mean pancreatic cancer. It just happens that pancreatic cancer is the most common cause that falls under Courvoisier's law. Other cause includes malignancy of the CBD (i.e. cholangiocarcinoma), head of pancreas and ampulla of Vater.

== Related conditions ==
A palpable tender gallbladder (hence the law cannot be applied) may be seen in acute acalculous cholecystitis, which commonly follows trauma or ischemia and causes acute inflammation of the gallbladder in the absence of gallstones.

A palpable gallbladder without mild jaundice (hence the law cannot be applied) can also be seen in Mirizzi's syndrome.

The following case is an illustration of using the rationale underlying the Courvoisier Law clinically. In a patient with a history of lung cancer presenting with jaundice and a non-palpable gallbladder it is likely that it is caused by a double cancer affected the common hepatic ducts and not from metastasis to the lymph node causing obstructive jaundice. This is because in the latter case, location of the lymph node has got to be in the CBD (simply by anatomical location) and one would expect a palpable gallbladder. All these speculations assume that the patient did not have gallstone disease previously (where the gallbladder would be fibrotic and not palpable) and that the patient does not have a history of other liver diseases (such as recurrent pyogenic cholangitis).

== See also ==
- Murphy's sign
- Abdominal examination
