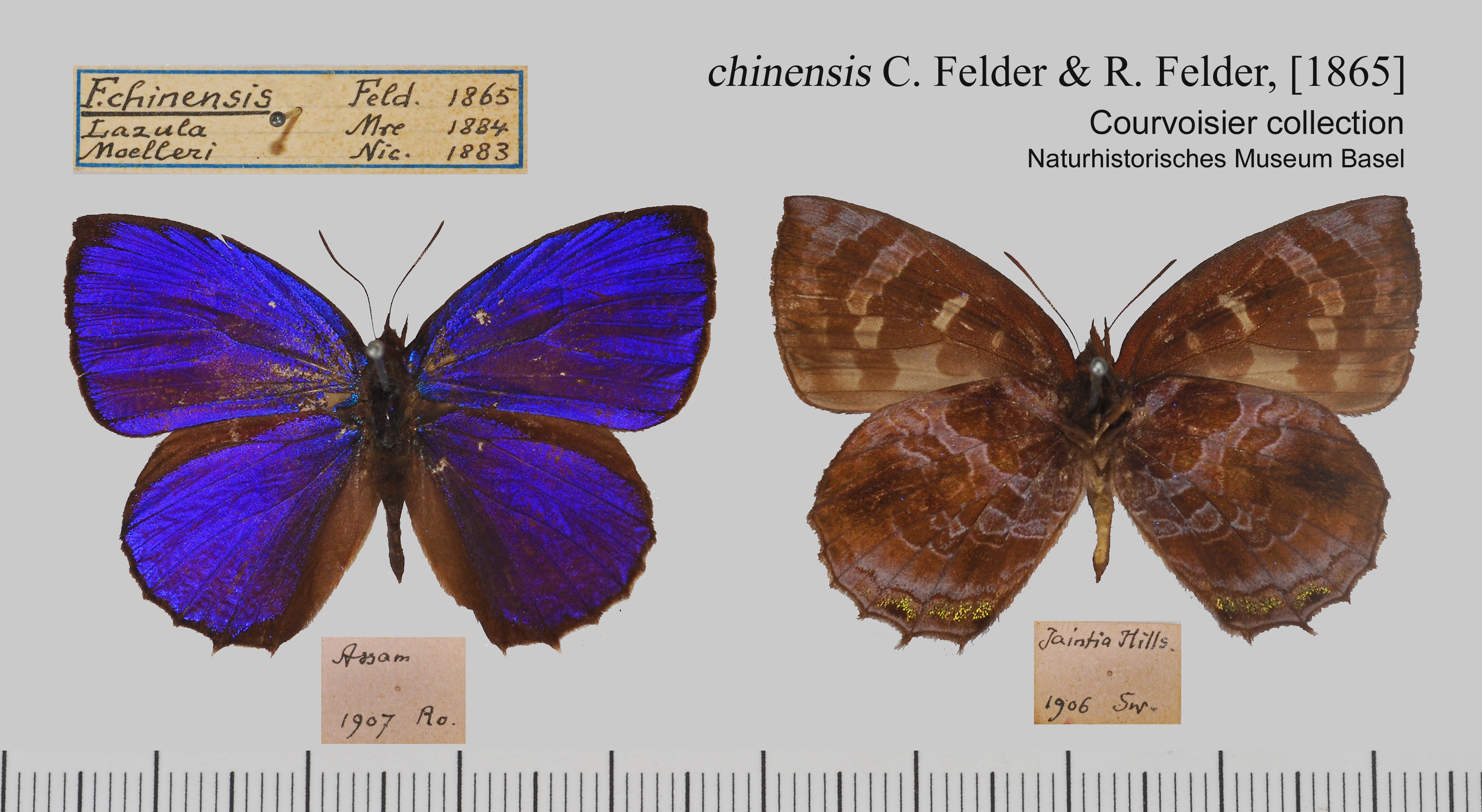
- From the Courvoisier Collection, Basel, Switzerland

Scientific classification
- Kingdom: Animalia
- Phylum: Arthropoda
- Class: Insecta
- Order: Lepidoptera
- Family: Lycaenidae
- Genus: Flos
- Species: F. chinensis

Binomial name
- Flos chinensis (C. Felder & R. Felder, [1865])

Synonyms
- Arhopala chinensis C. & R. Felder, [1865]; Nilasera moelleri de Nicéville, 1883; Satadra lazula Moore, 1884; Arhopala asoka vaya Fruhstorfer, 1914

= Flos chinensis =

Species of butterfly

Flos chinensis, the Chinese plushblue, is a butterfly in the family Lycaenidae. It was described by Cajetan and Rudolf Felder in 1865. It is found in the Indomalayan realm (Sikkim, Bhutan, Assam, southwest China to Shanghai).Hindwing tail short(1mm). Underside of hindwing with metallic scaling at tornus.Male shining dark blue, border 1 mm. at apex, 4 mm. elsewhere.Male forewing 22 mm.Female purple with broad borders.Seitz 150e.
