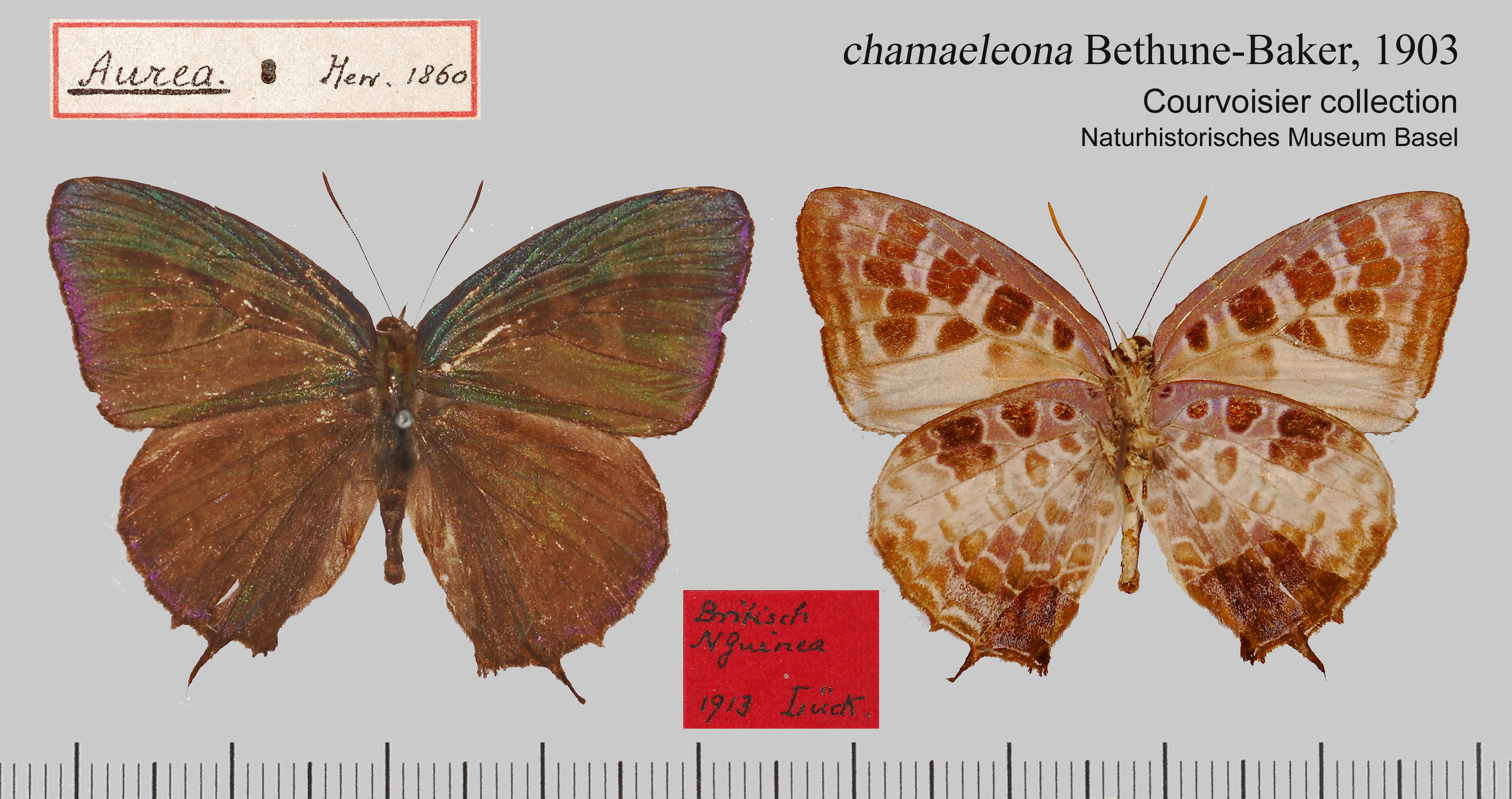
- From the Courvoisier Collection, Basel, Switzerland

Scientific classification
- Kingdom: Animalia
- Phylum: Arthropoda
- Clade: Pancrustacea
- Class: Insecta
- Order: Lepidoptera
- Family: Lycaenidae
- Genus: Arhopala
- Species: A. chamaeleona

Binomial name
- Arhopala chamaeleona Bethune-Baker, 1903

Synonyms
- Arhopala elagabulus Fruhstorfer, 1914; Arhopala restricta Rothschild, 1916; Arhopala heliogabulus Seitz, 1926; Narathura maputi Takanami, 1984; Narathura mizunumai H. Hayashi, 1978; Arhopala rileyi Joicey & Talbot, 1922

= Arhopala chamaeleona =

Species of butterfly

Arhopala chamaeleona is a butterfly in the family Lycaenidae. It was described by George Thomas Bethune-Baker in 1903. It is found in the Indomalayan and Australasian realms.

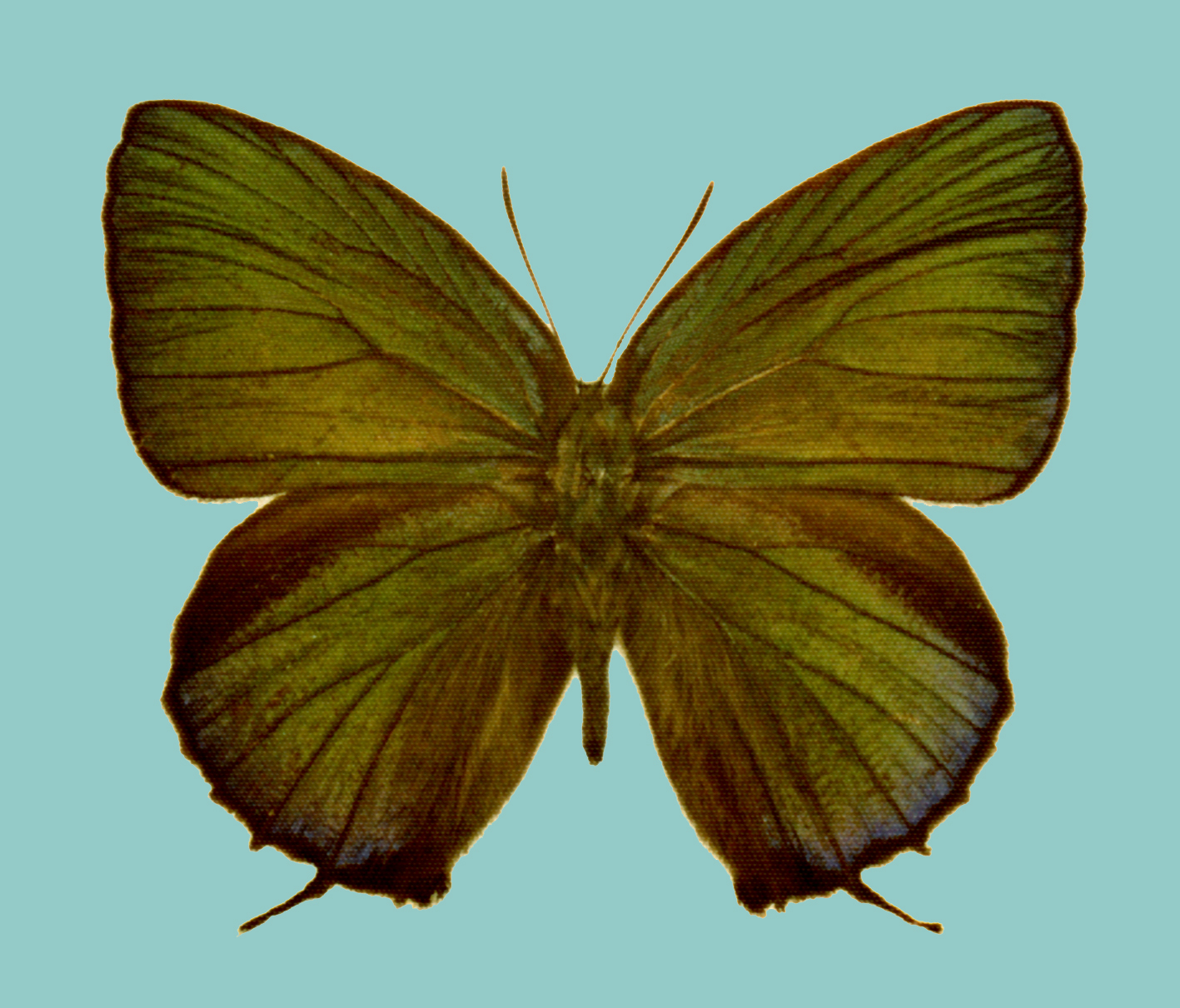
Arhopala chamaeleona mizunumai, ♂

== Description ==
Both wings deep metallic green, shading to brown in some lights.Hindwing being green almost to the margin. Below, uniform brown, no white areas: hindwing under with well-developed tornal metallic scaling. Form restricta Above, brown-black, forewings violet-blue on basal 3/4 }}

== Subspecies ==
- A. c. chamaeleona (Biak, Noemfoor, Jobi, New Guinea)
- A. c. rileyi Joicey & Talbot, 1922 (Serang)
- A. c. mizunumai (Hayashi, 1978) (Philippines: Leyte, Samar, Mindanao, Marinduque)
- A. c. maputi (Takanami, 1984) (Philippines: Marinduque)
- A. c. susyae Tennent & Rawlins, 2010 (Moluccas)
