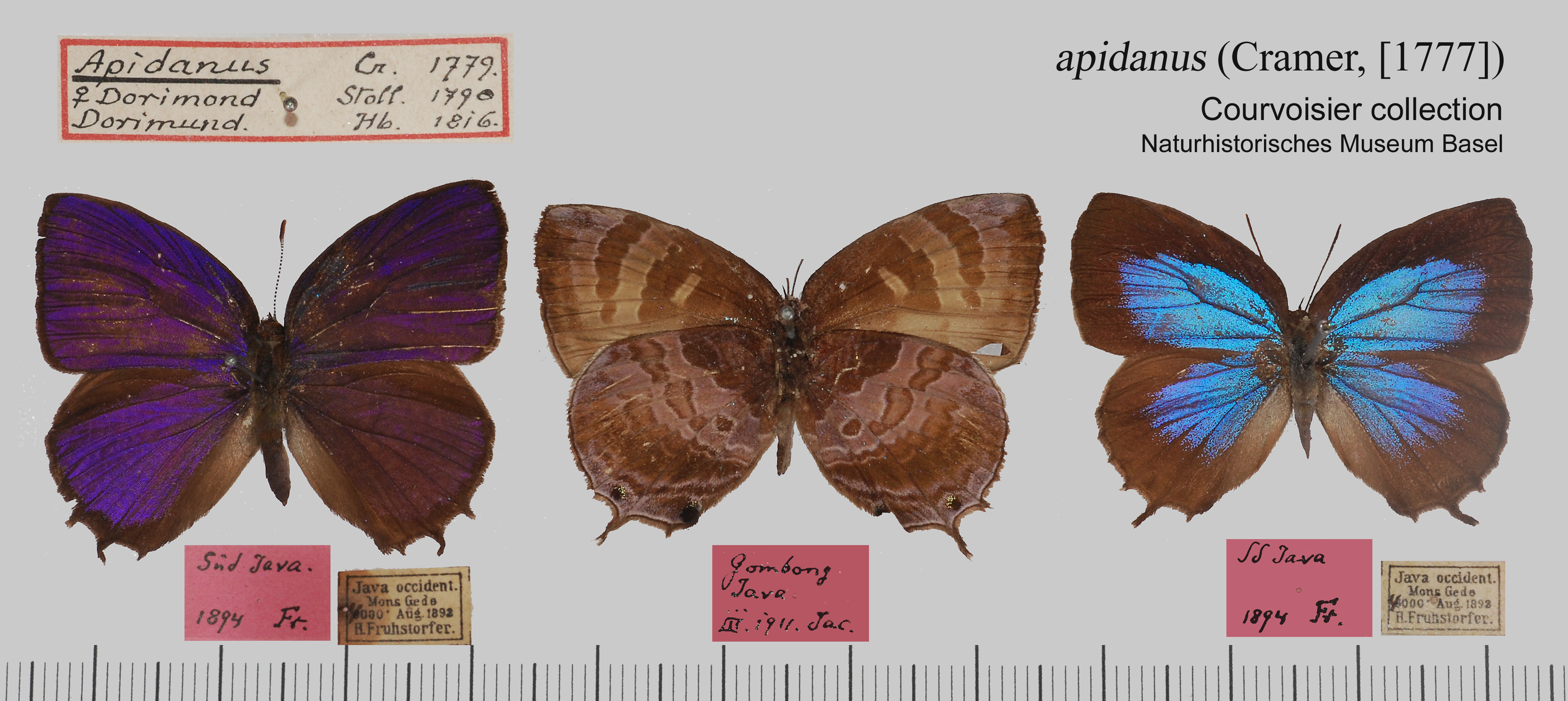
- From the Courvoisier Collection, Basel

Scientific classification
- Kingdom: Animalia
- Phylum: Arthropoda
- Class: Insecta
- Order: Lepidoptera
- Family: Lycaenidae
- Genus: Flos
- Species: F. apidanus

Binomial name
- Flos apidanus (Cramer, [1777])

Synonyms
- Amblypodia apidanus

= Flos apidanus =

Plain plushblue

Species of butterfly

Flos apidanus, the plain plushblue, is a small butterfly found in the Indomalayan realm that belongs to the lycaenids or blues family. The species was first described by Pieter Cramer in 1777.

== Subspecies ==
- F. a. apidanus Java, Bali, Lombok, Sumbawa, Tanahdjampea, Tambora
- F. a. ahamus Doherty, 1891 Assam, central Myanmar, southern Myanmar, Mergui, Thailand, Langkawi
- F. a. saturatus (Snellen, 1890) Peninsular Malaya, Sumatra, Bangka, Borneo, Belitung
- F. a. xisuthrus (Fruhstorfer, 1914) Nias
- F. a. arahat (Fruhstorfer, 1914) Bawean
- F. a. phalakron (Fruhstorfer, 1914) Northeast Sumatra
- F. a. himna (Fruhstorfer, 1914) Philippines (Mindanao)
- F. a. palawanus (Staudinger, 1889) Palawan, Sulawesi
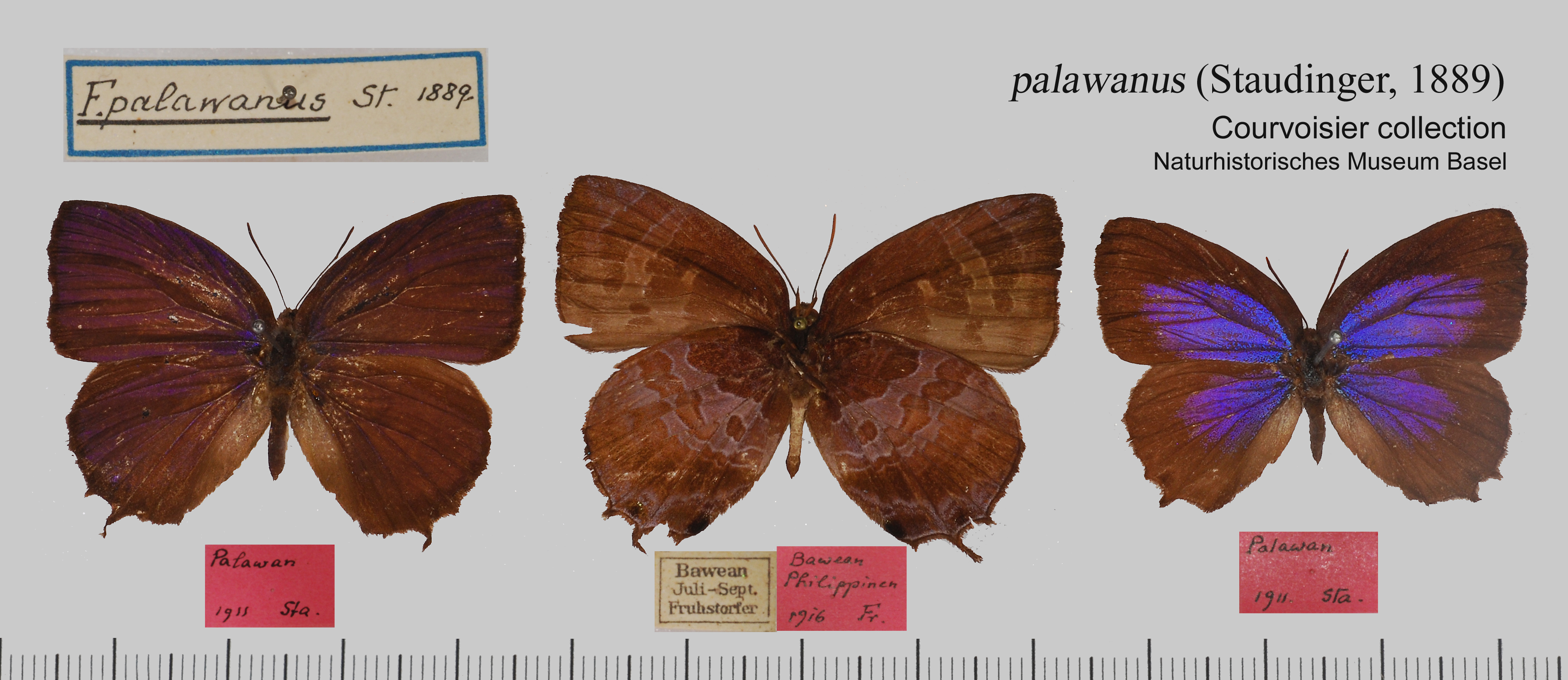
F. a. palawanus

== Range in India ==
The butterfly is found in India from Assam (Cachar) to Karens (Myanmar) and from Dawnas to southern Myanmar.

== Status ==
In 1932, William Harry Evans reported that the species was rare.

== See also ==
- List of butterflies of India (Lycaenidae)
