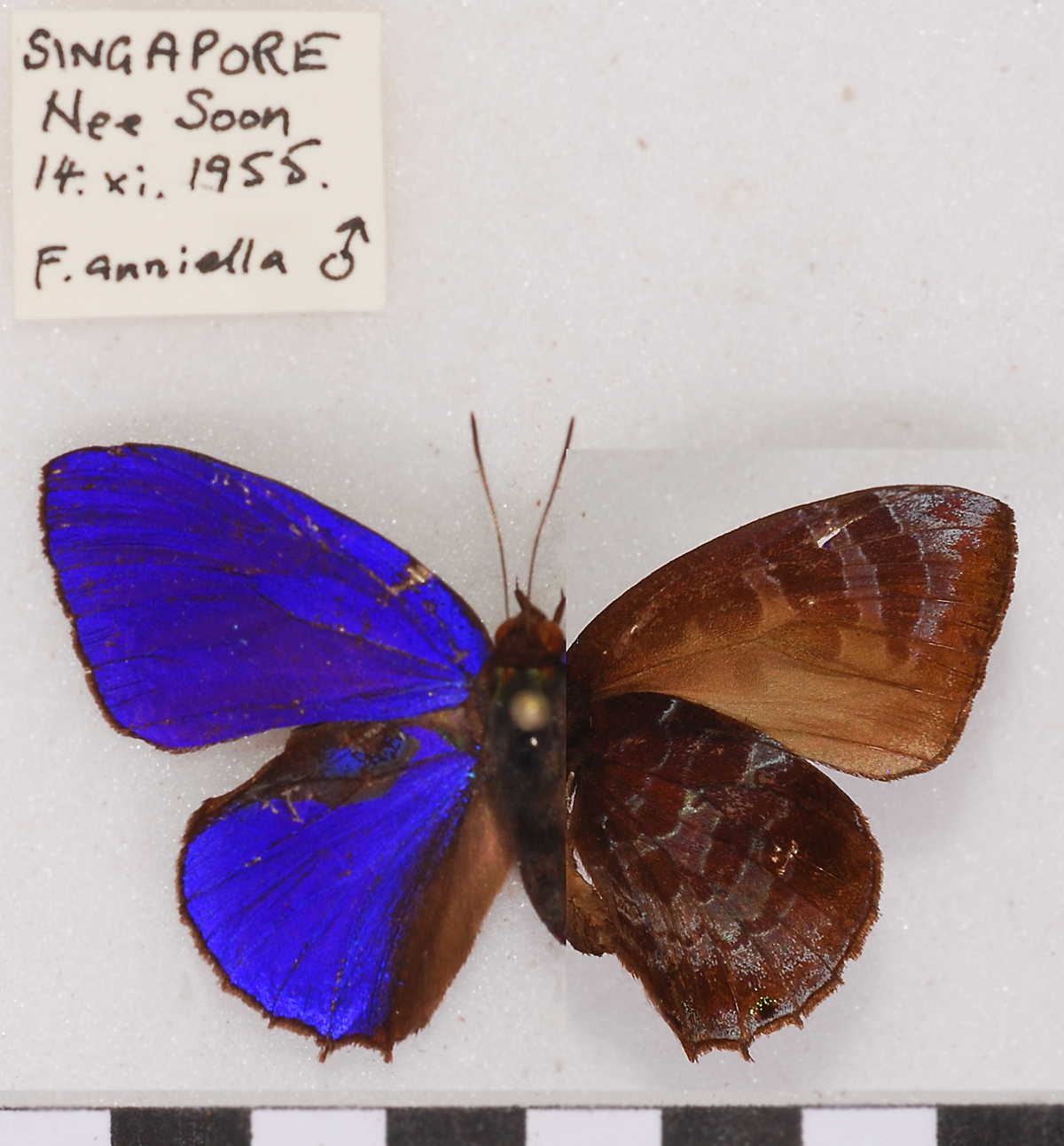
- Flos anniella

Scientific classification
- Kingdom: Animalia
- Phylum: Arthropoda
- Class: Insecta
- Order: Lepidoptera
- Family: Lycaenidae
- Subfamily: Theclinae
- Tribe: Arhopalini
- Genus: Flos; Doherty, 1889

= Flos =

Butterfly genus in family Lycaenidae

Flos is a genus of butterflies in the family Lycaenidae. The species of this genus are commonly known as plushblues and are found in the Indomalayan realm.

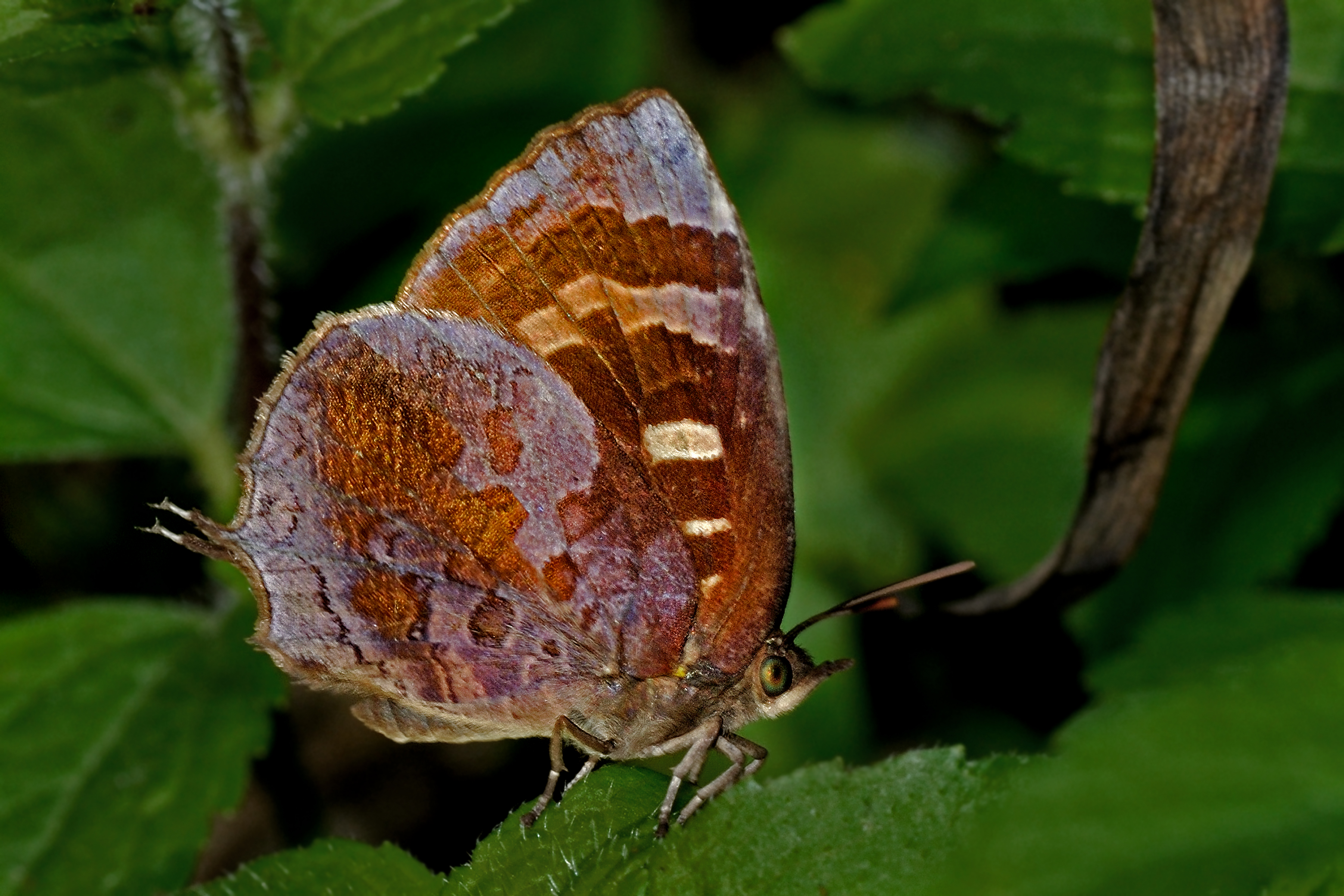
Close wing position of Flos adriana – variegated plushblue in Buxa Tiger Reserve, Alipurduar, West Bengal, India

== Species ==
- Flos diardi (Hewitson, 1862) - shining plushblue, bifid plushblue
- Flos fulgida (Hewitson, 1863) - shining plushblue
- Flos bungo Evans, 1957
- Flos kuehni (Röber, 1887) - Kuehn's plushblue
- Flos anniella (Hewitson, 1862)
- Flos apidanus (Cramer, [1777]) - plain pushblue
- Flos arca (de Nicéville, [1893])
- Flos iriya (Fruhstorfer, 1914)
- Flos adriana (de Nicéville, [1884]) - variegated plushblue
- Flos asoka (de Nicéville, [1884])
- Flos areste (Hewitson, 1862) - tailless plushblue
- Flos chinensis (C. & R. Felder, [1865]) - Chinese plushblue
- Flos morphina (Distant, 1884)
- Flos setsuroi Hayashi, 1981
