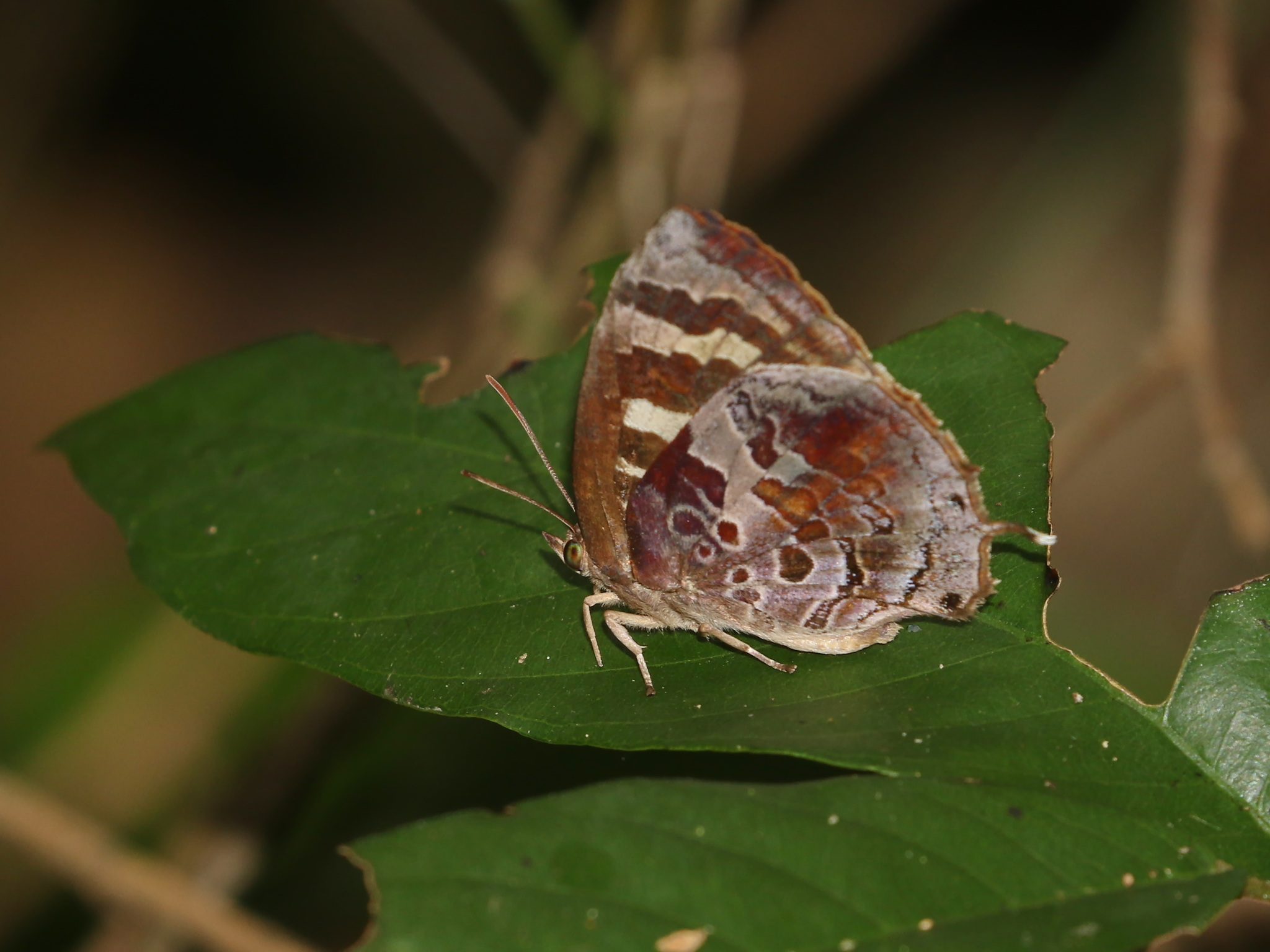

Scientific classification
- Kingdom: Animalia
- Phylum: Arthropoda
- Class: Insecta
- Order: Lepidoptera
- Family: Lycaenidae
- Genus: Flos
- Species: F. adriana

Binomial name
- Flos adriana (de Nicéville, 1884)

Synonyms
- Nilasera adriana; Amblypodia adriana; Arhopala adriana

= Flos adriana =

Species of butterfly

Flos adriana, the variegated plushblue, is a species of lycaenid or blue butterfly found in Asia. The species was first described by Lionel de Nicéville in 1884. This species is monotypic.

== Description ==
The upperside is similar to Flos asoka, but the black border is twice as wide. The underside forewing is marked as in Flos asoka. The hindwing is dark brown glossed with pale violet gray.
