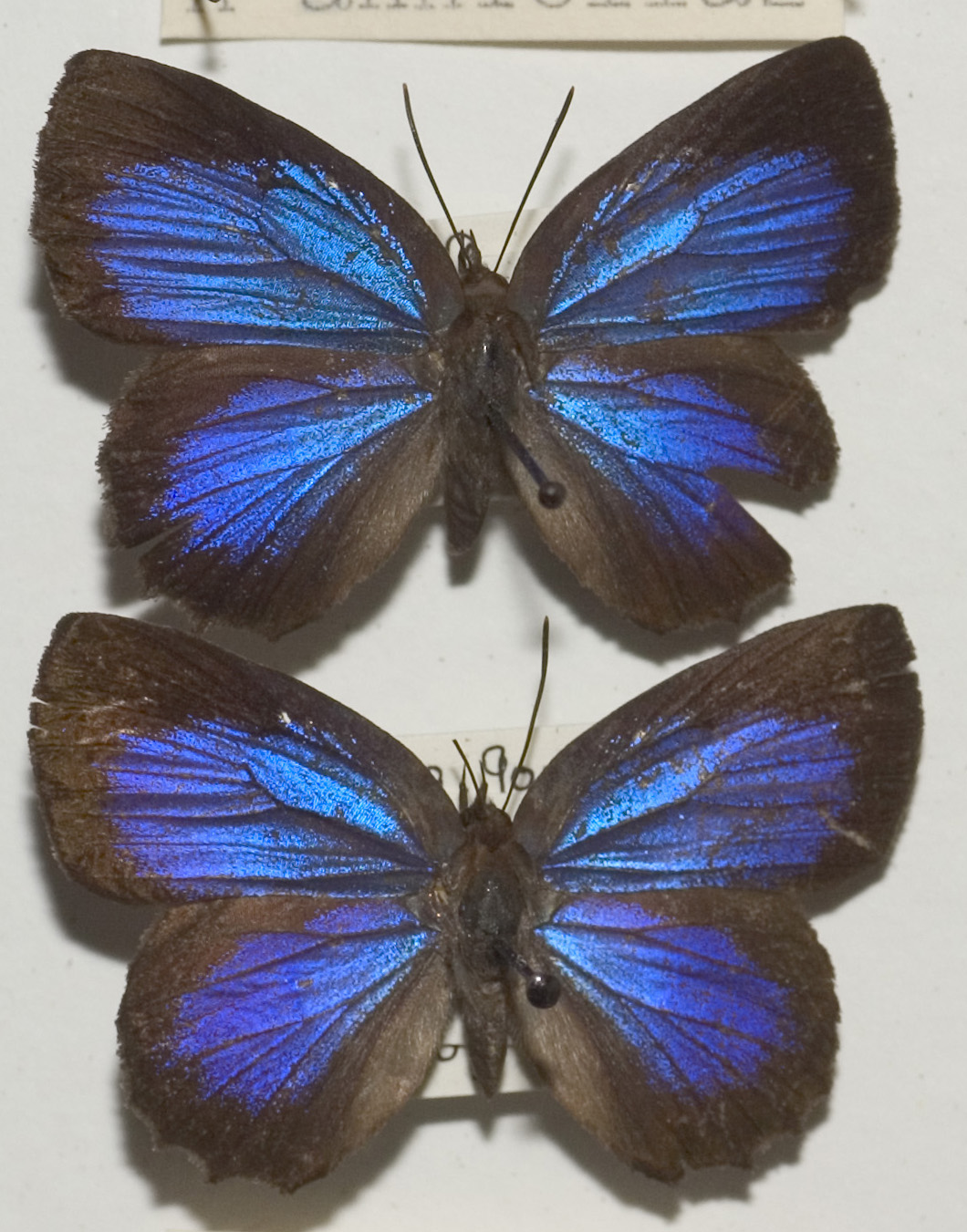

Scientific classification
- Kingdom: Animalia
- Phylum: Arthropoda
- Class: Insecta
- Order: Lepidoptera
- Family: Lycaenidae
- Genus: Flos
- Species: F. diardi

Binomial name
- Flos diardi (Hewitson, 1862)

Synonyms
- Amblypodia abseus; Arhopala diardi (Hewitson, 1862)

= Flos diardi =

Bifid plushblue

Species of butterfly

Flos diardi, the bifid plushblue, is a species of lycaenid or blue butterfly found in Asia. The species was first described by William Chapman Hewitson in 1862. Hindwing produced at tornus (tailed) Underside of hindwing discal band in spaces 7, 6 oblique and tapered from apex to end-cell spot. Underside of hindwing with a bifid spot mid-costa, separated from the dark basal area.
