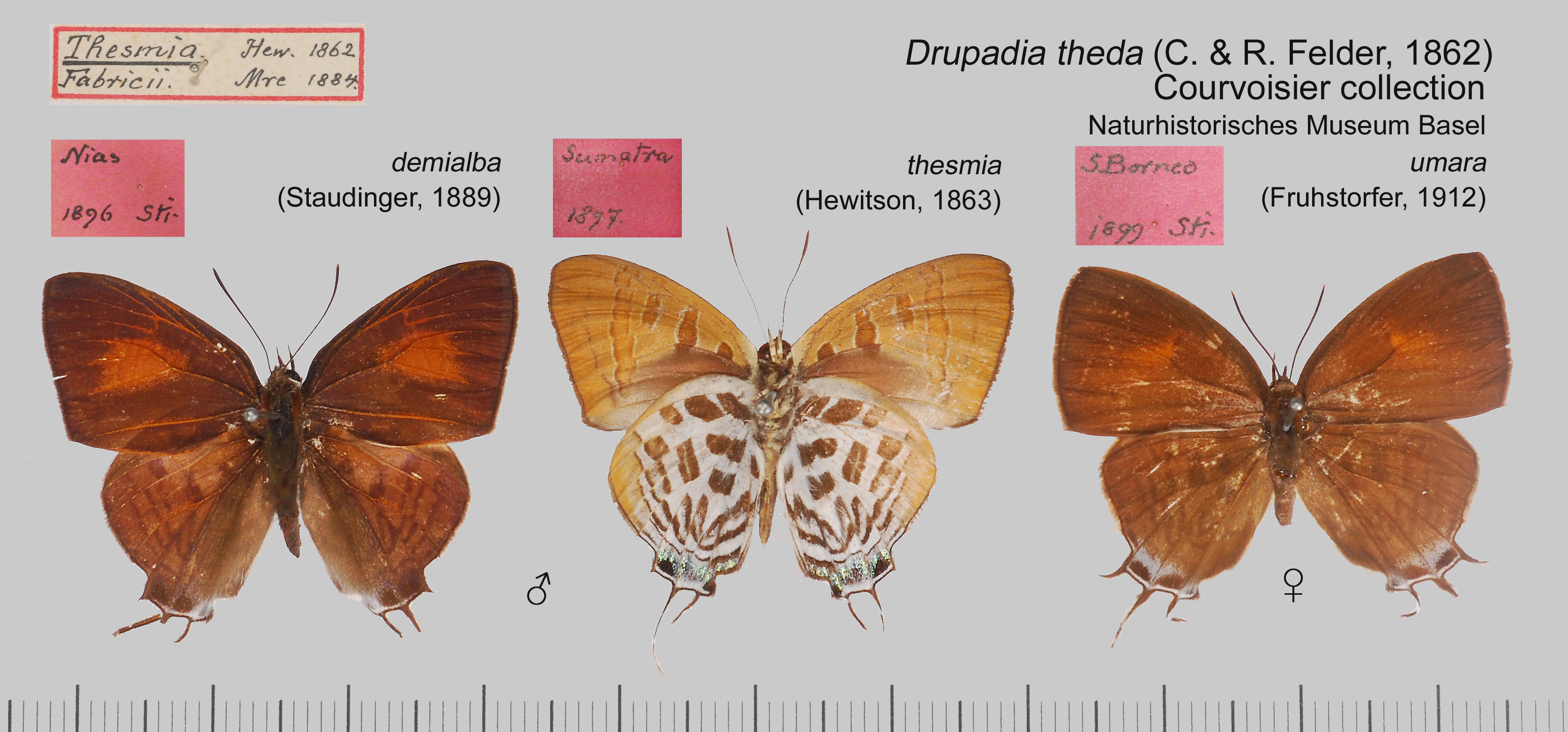

Scientific classification
- Kingdom: Animalia
- Phylum: Arthropoda
- Class: Insecta
- Order: Lepidoptera
- Family: Lycaenidae
- Genus: Flos
- Species: F. anniella

Binomial name
- Flos anniella (Hewitson, 1862)

Synonyms
- Amblypodia anniella Hewitson, 1862; Arhopala anniella husaina Fruhstorfer, 1914; Arhopala triangularis Bethune-Baker, 1903; Flos artegal Doherty, 1889; Flos gunnanensis Wang & Fan, 2002; Amblypodia anniella malangana Toxopeus, 1929

= Flos anniella =

Species of butterfly

Flos anniella or darkie plushblue, is a species of butterfly belonging to the lycaenid family described by William Chapman Hewitson in 1862. It is found in the Indomalayan realm.

== Subspecies ==
- Flos anniella anniella (Singapore, Peninsular Malaya, southern Thailand, Sumatra, Borneo)
- Flos anniella artegal Doherty, 1889 (central Burma to northern Thailand, Mergui)
- Flos anniella malangana (Toxopeus, 1929) (Java)
