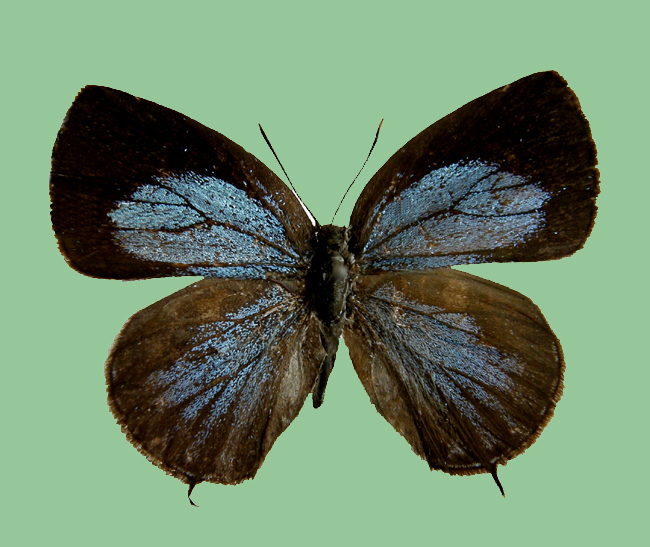
- Male upperside
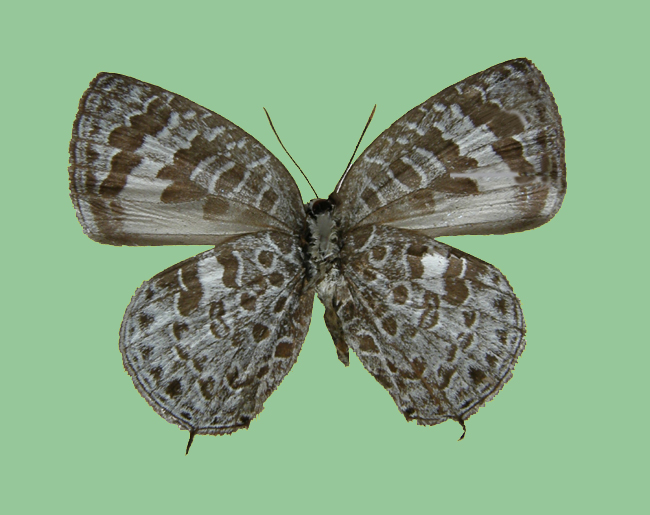
- Male underside

Scientific classification
- Kingdom: Animalia
- Phylum: Arthropoda
- Clade: Pancrustacea
- Class: Insecta
- Order: Lepidoptera
- Family: Lycaenidae
- Genus: Arhopala
- Species: A. paraganesa
- Subspecies: A. p. felipa

Trinomial name
- Arhopala paraganesa felipa Lamas, 2008

Synonyms
- Arhopala paraganesa hayashii Schroeder & Treadaway, 2002 (preocc.)

= Arhopala paraganesa felipa =

Subspecies of butterfly

Arhopala paraganesa felipa is a rare butterfly of the family Lycaenidae first described by Gerardo Lamas in 2008. It is a subspecies of Arhopala paraganesa. It is found on Palawan Island in the Philippines. Forewing length is 13-14.5 mm (male); 13–14 mm (female).
