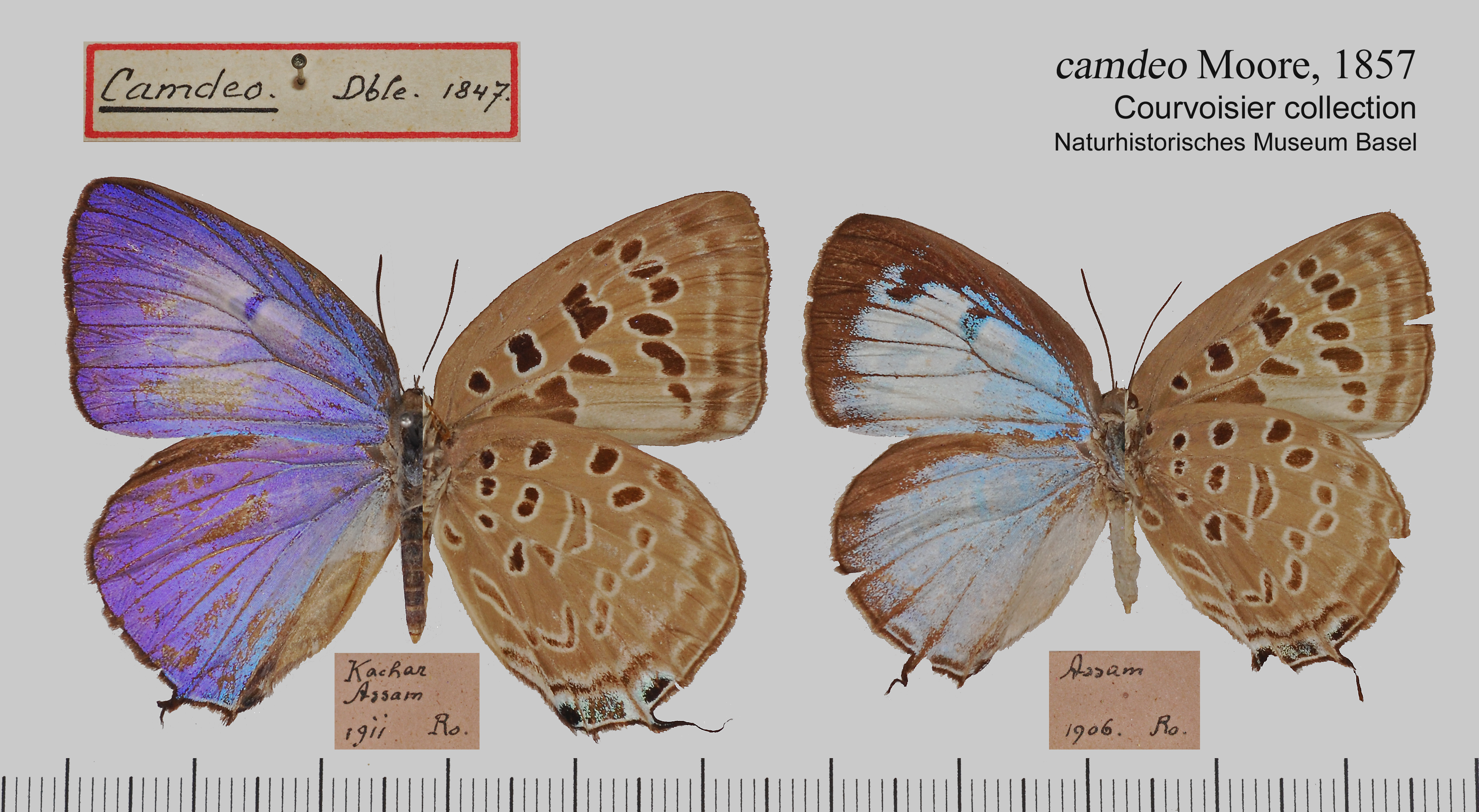
- From the Courvoisier Collection, Basel, Switzerland

Scientific classification
- Kingdom: Animalia
- Phylum: Arthropoda
- Clade: Pancrustacea
- Class: Insecta
- Order: Lepidoptera
- Family: Lycaenidae
- Genus: Arhopala
- Species: A. camdeo

Binomial name
- Arhopala camdeo (Moore, [1858])

Synonyms
- Amblypodia camdeo Moore, 1857; Amblypodia camdeo sebonga Tytler, 1926

= Arhopala camdeo =

Species of butterfly

Arhopala camdeo, the lilac oakblue, is a butterfly in the family Lycaenidae. It was described by Frederic Moore in 1858. It is found in the Indomalayan realm (Sikkim to Assam, Bhutan, Manipur, Burma, Thailand and Vietnam).

Easily recognised by the colouring above; the male is very light sky-blue, with a large white discal spot. Wings of female broadly and irregularly margined. Beneath all the transverse bands are broken up into rows of ring-spots.

== Subspecies ==
- Arhopala camdeo camdeo (India: Sikkim to Assam, Bhutan, Manipur, Burma, Thailand, Vietnam)
- Arhopala camdeo sebonga Tytler, 1926 (India)
