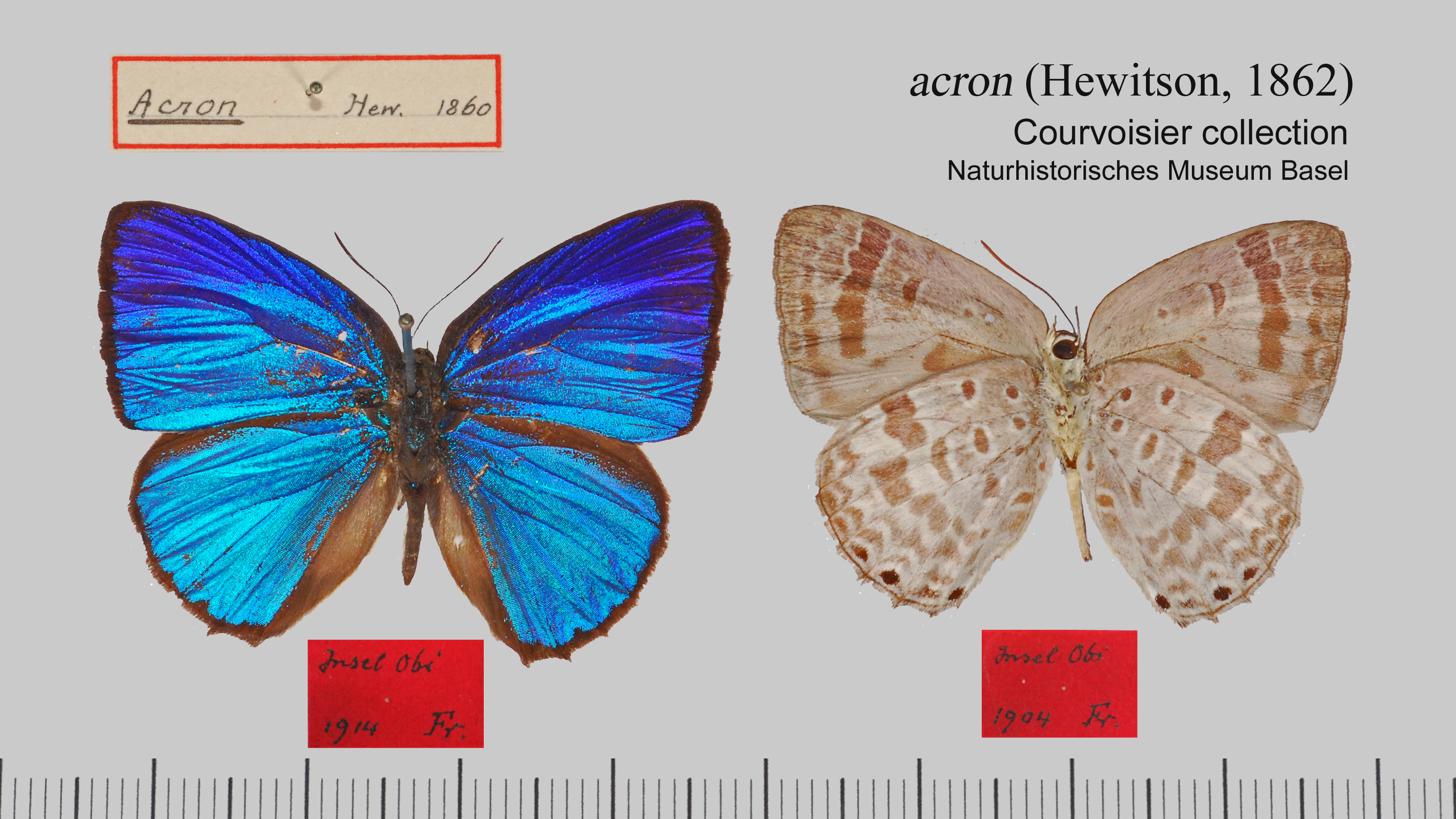
- From the Courvoisier Collection, Basel, Switzerland

Scientific classification
- Kingdom: Animalia
- Phylum: Arthropoda
- Clade: Pancrustacea
- Class: Insecta
- Order: Lepidoptera
- Family: Lycaenidae
- Genus: Arhopala
- Species: A. acron

Binomial name
- Arhopala acron (Hewitson, 1862)

Synonyms
- Amblypodia acron Hewitson, 1862

= Arhopala acron =

Species of butterfly

Arhopala acron is a butterfly in the family Lycaenidae. It was described by William Chapman Hewitson in 1862. It is found in the Australasian realm, where it has been recorded from Bachan and Halmahera.

The male has a Morpho-blue upper surface, the hindmarginal part of the forewing and the hindwing are of a glistening silvery blue, the costal part of the forewing is much darker; the under surface, however, is not whitish, but dark brown with white-edged bands and spots, somewhat similar to the agelastus-group
