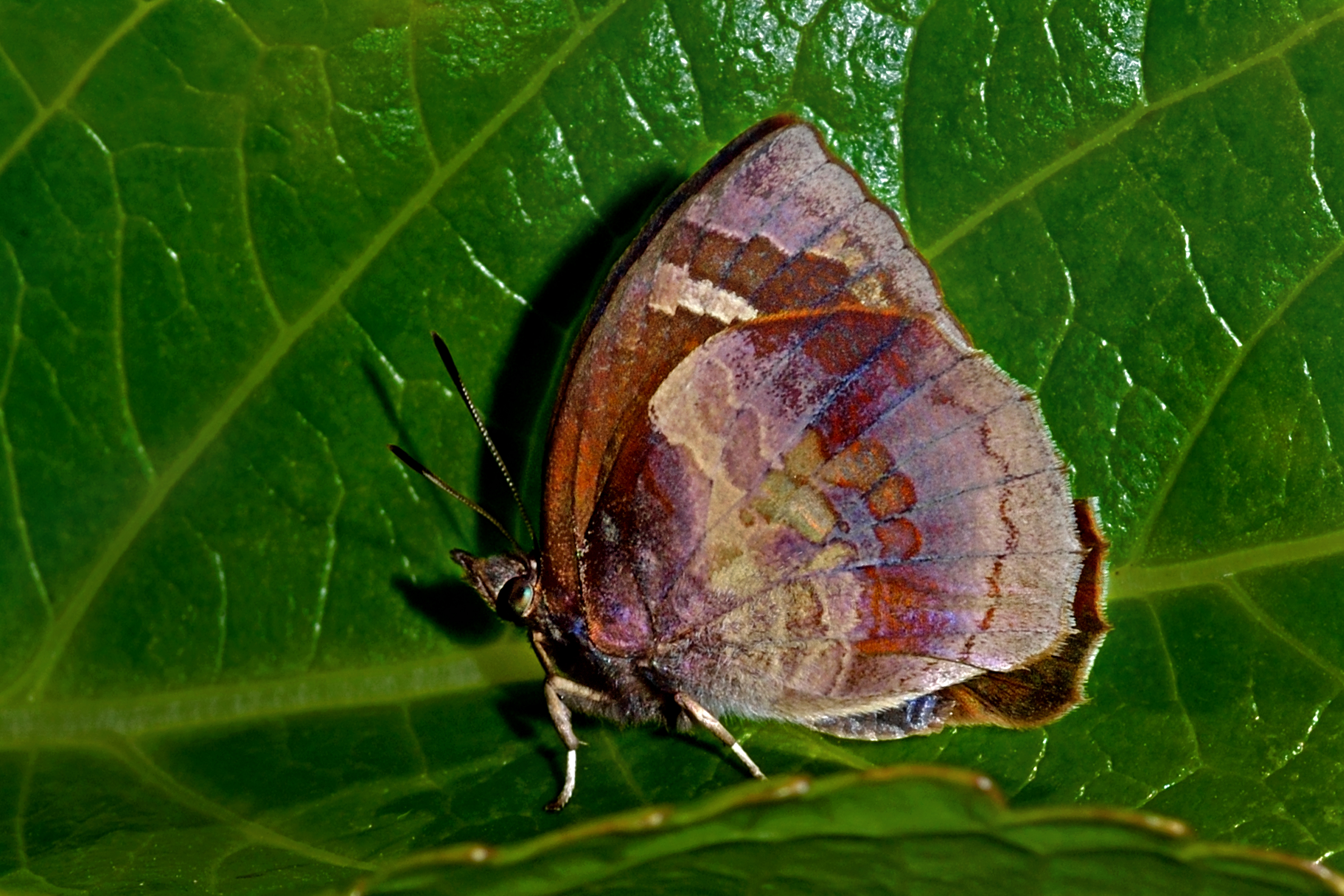
- Flos areste ventral
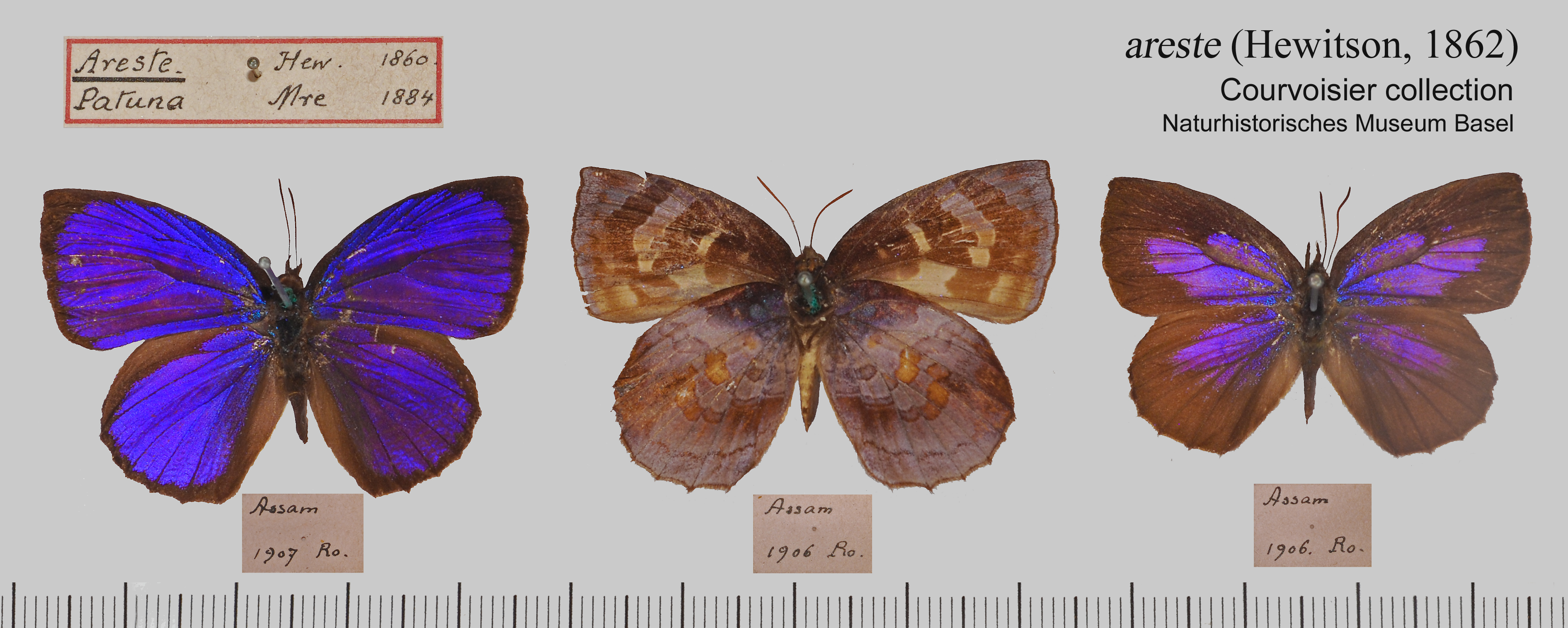
- Flos areste

Scientific classification
- Kingdom: Animalia
- Phylum: Arthropoda
- Class: Insecta
- Order: Lepidoptera
- Family: Lycaenidae
- Genus: Flos
- Species: F. areste

Binomial name
- Flos areste (Hewitson, 1862)

Synonyms
- Amblypodia areste Hewitson, 1862

= Flos areste =

Tailless plushblue

Species of butterfly

Flos areste, the tailless plushblue, is a small butterfly found in the Indomalayan region that belongs to the lycaenids or blues family.

== Range ==
The butterfly occurs in India from Sikkim to Assam and the northern and southern Shan states Burma, Thailand to Peninsular Malaya and China (Zhejiang, Guangdong).

== Status ==
In 1932, William Harry Evans reported that the species was rare.

== See also ==
- List of butterflies of India (Lycaenidae)
