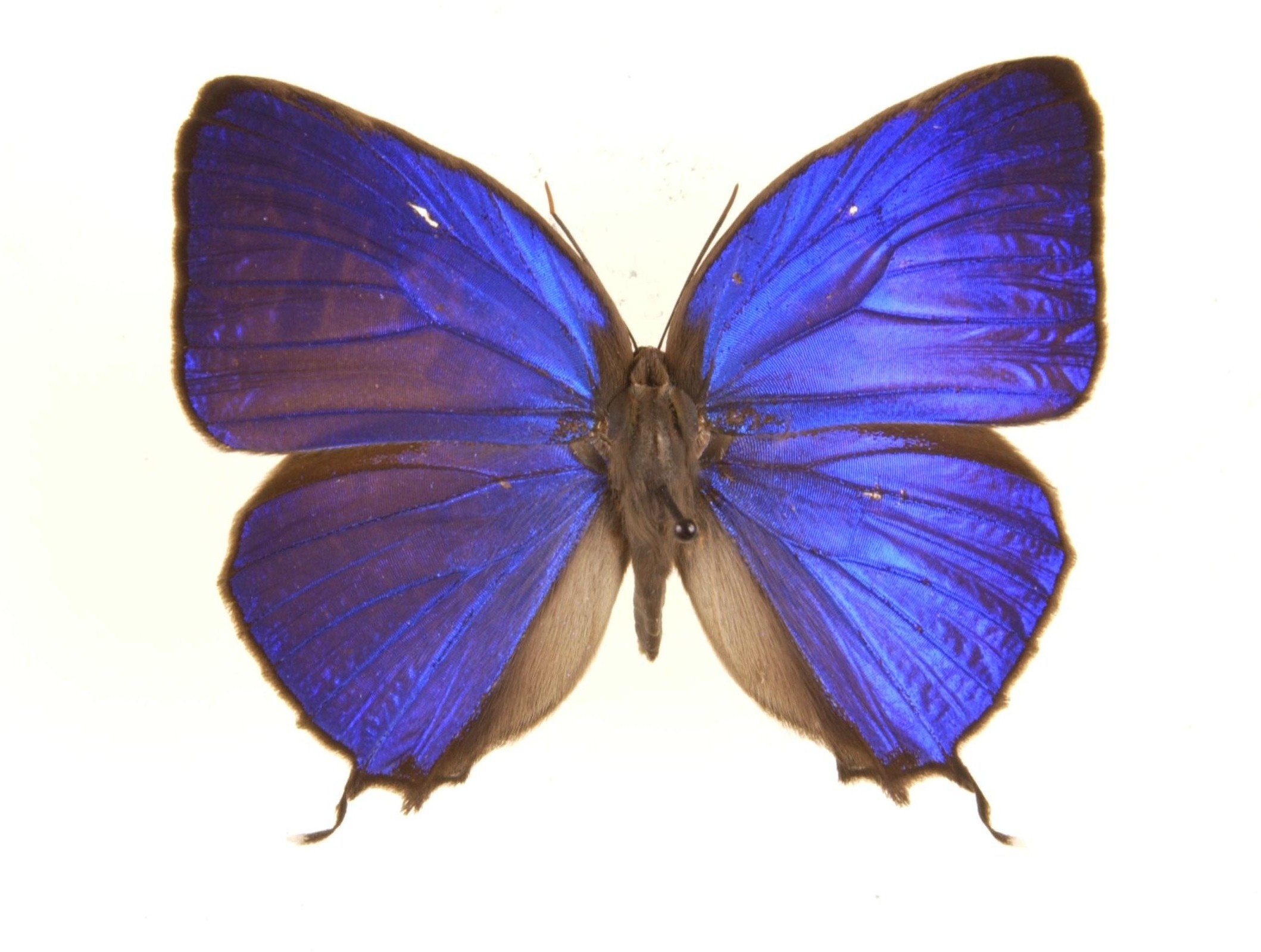
- A. a. anthelus

Conservation status
- Least Concern (IUCN 3.1)

Scientific classification
- Kingdom: Animalia
- Phylum: Arthropoda
- Clade: Pancrustacea
- Class: Insecta
- Order: Lepidoptera
- Family: Lycaenidae
- Genus: Arhopala
- Species: A. anthelus

Binomial name
- Arhopala anthelus (Westwood, 1851)

Synonyms
- Amblypodia anthlus Westwood, [1851]; Amblypodia anthea Evans, 1925; Arhopala grahami Corbet, 1941; Amblyopia anunda Hewitson, [1869]; Narathara anthelios impar Evans, 1957; Amblyopia anthelios var. saturation Staudinger, 1889

= Arhopala anthelus =

Anthelus bushblue

Species of butterfly

Arhopala anthelus, the angelus bush blue, is a species of lycaenid or blue butterfly found in the Indomalayan realm.

== Description ==
Male. Upperside : both wings brilliant shining violet-blue; the primaries with black linear costa and posterior margin; secondaries with broadish brown costa, linear black posterior margin, and very pale grey abdominal fold. Tail black, white-tipped. Underside : both wings pale greyish brown, with dark spots broadly edged with whitish. Primaries with three large increasing spots, touching the second of which are two or three somewhat confluent spots up to the costal nervure. Upperside : both wings violet, with very broad brown costal and posterior margins to primaries and less broad borders to the secondaries. Underside as in male.

== Subspecies ==
- A. a. anthelus (Burma)
- A. a. anthea (Evans, 1925) (Mergui, southern Burma, Thailand, Vietnam, Laos)
- A. a. anunda (Hewitson, [1869]) (Borneo, Sumatra) -abundant panther-like stripes on the under surface, on which the prominent dark spots are surrounded by a bright ochreous-yellow colour. In the female the whole distal halves of the wings above are darkened, the black margin of the wings being 3 to 4 mm broad.
- A. a. expallida Seki, 1994 (Sumatra)
- A. a. fulgurita Seki, 1994 (Mentawai islands)
- A. a. grahami Corbet, 1941 (Peninsular Malaysia, Langkawi)with female blue to violet blue with broad borders.
- A. a. impar Evans, 1957 (Mindoro)
- A. a. jabadia Fruhstorfer, 1914 (western Java) males above morpho-blue.
- A. a. majestatis Fruhstorfer, 1914 (Nias)- above deep blue, with a very bright gloss.
- A. a. marinduquensis Hayashi, Schröder & Treadaway, 1984 (Philippines: Marinduque)
- A. a. mitis Seki, 1994 (Pulau Belitung)
- A. a. paradisii Schröder & Treadaway, 1990 (Philippines: Dinagat)
- A. a. reverie Seki, 1994 (Panay Island)
- A. a. sanmariana Osada & Hashimoto, 1987 (Philippines: north-eastern Luzon)
- A. a. saturatior (Staudinger, 1889) (Philippines: Palawan)
- A. a. sotades Fruhstorfer, 1914 (Philippines: Mindanao)- glaring light blue, the female sometimes with a greenish lustre above; ground-colour beneath more intensely smoke-brown.

== Gallery ==
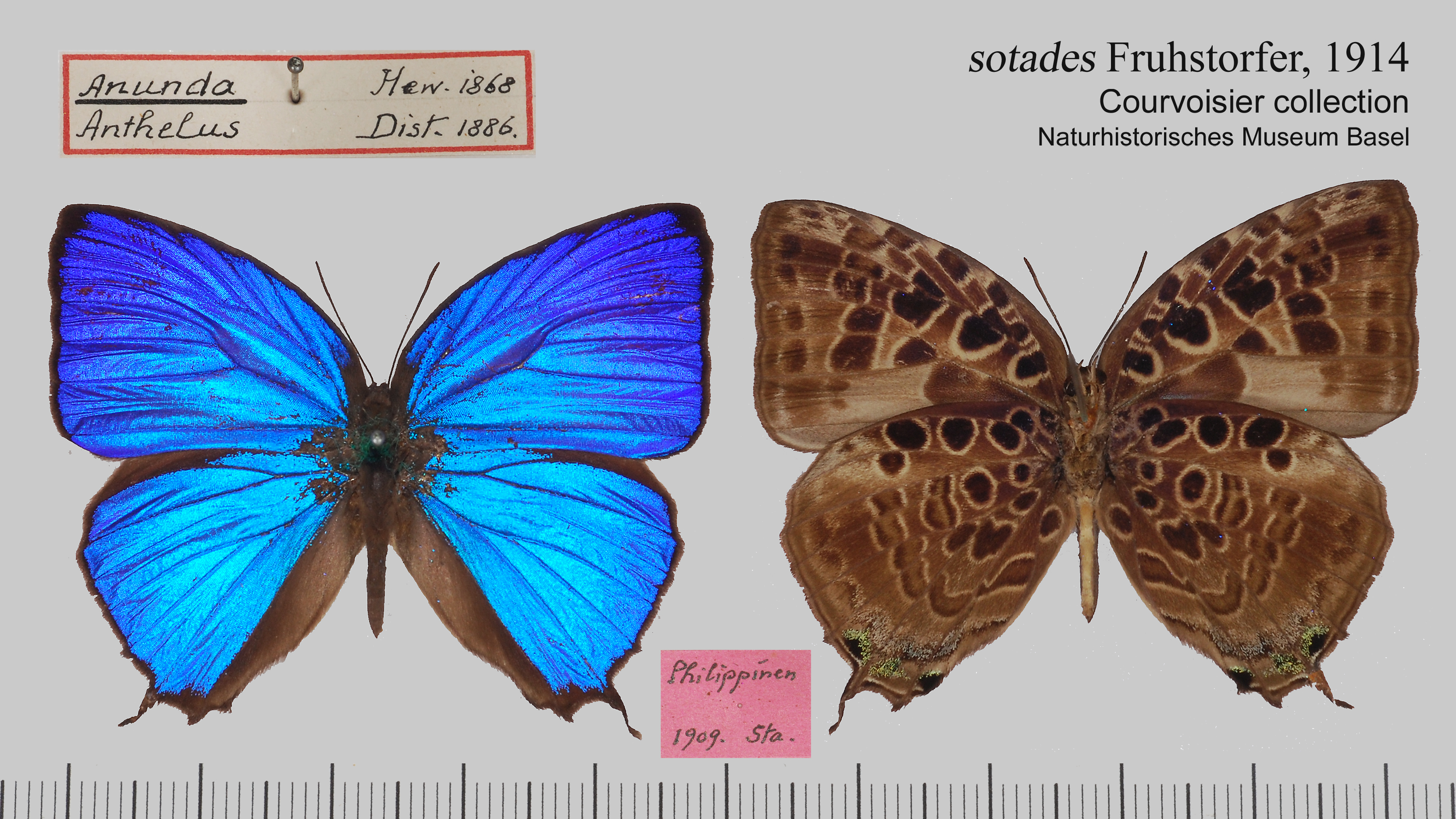
A. a. sotades From the Courvoisier Collection, Basel, Switzerland

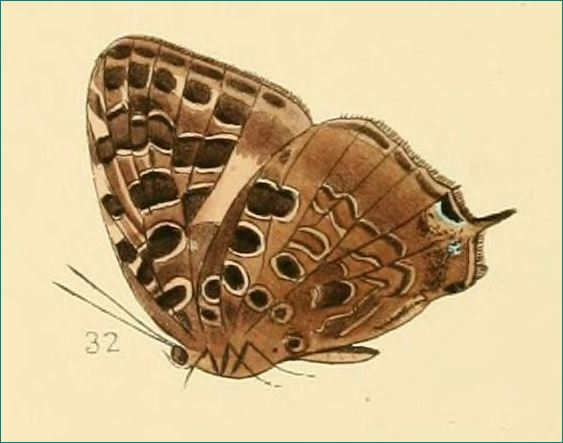
A. a. anunda

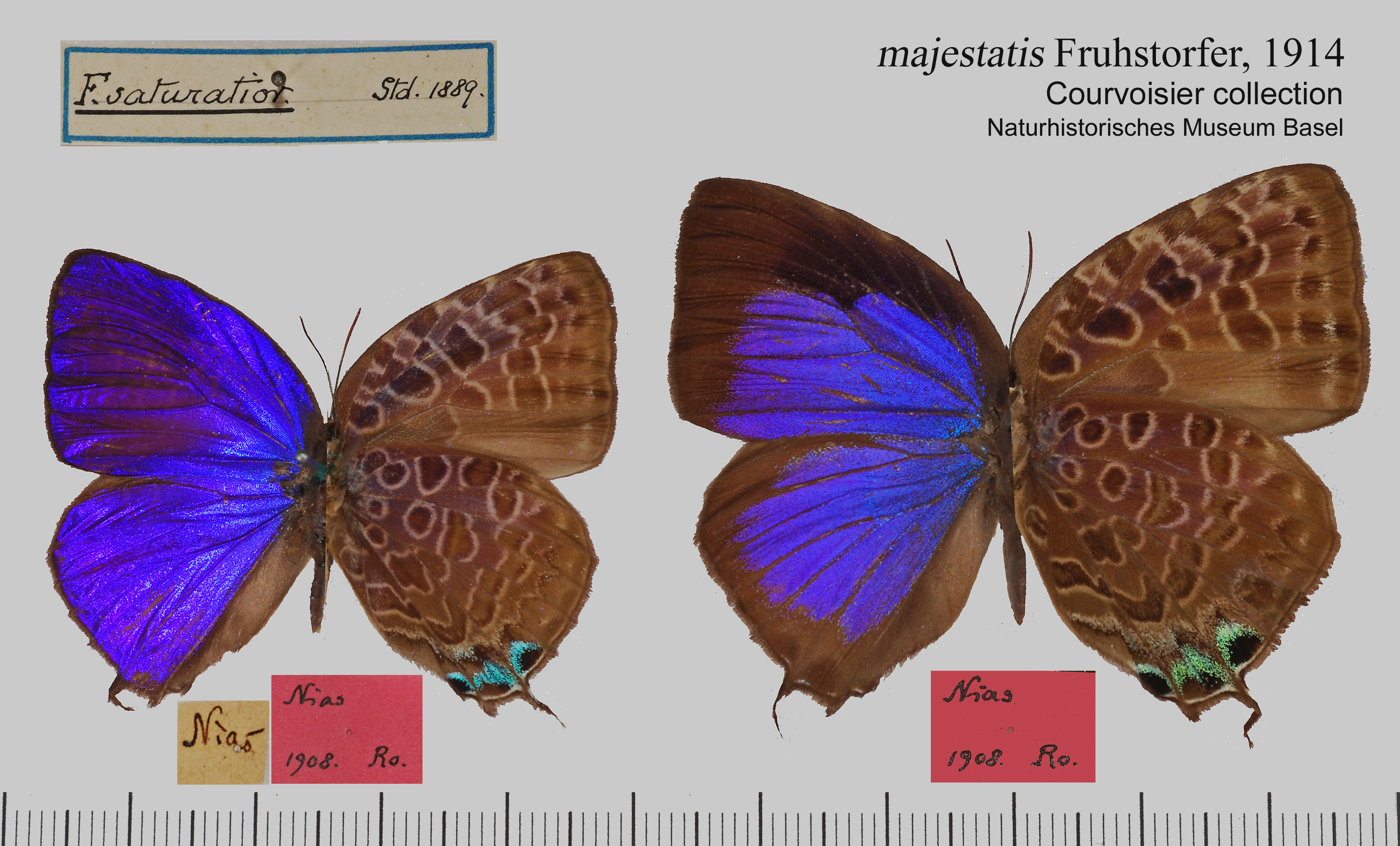
A. a. majestatis

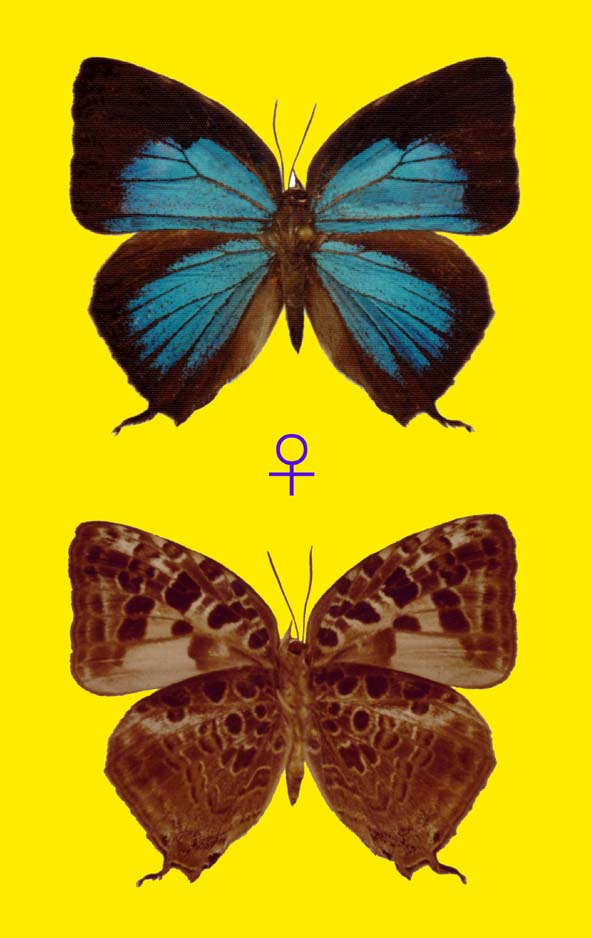
A. a. marinduquensis
