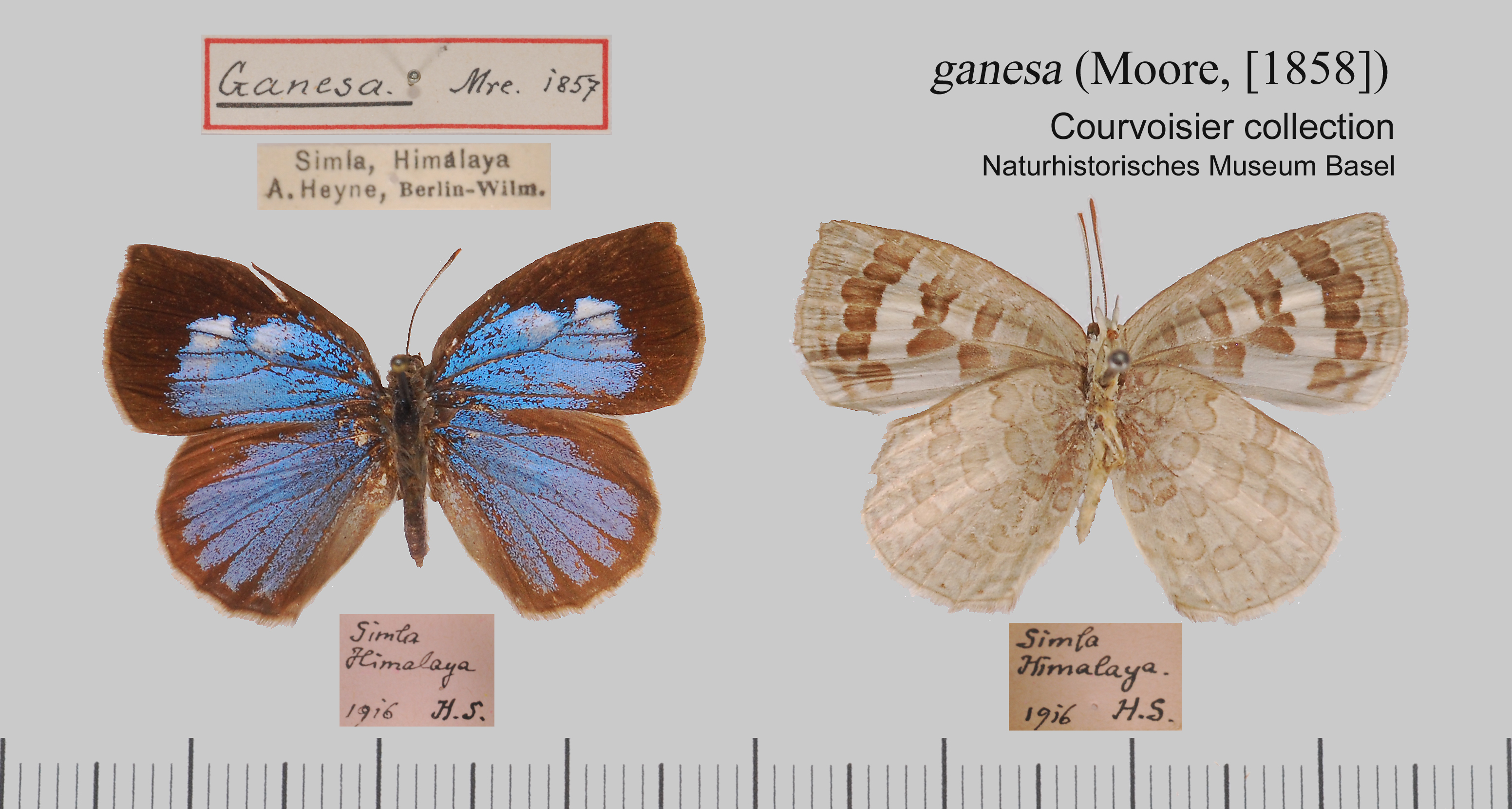

Scientific classification
- Kingdom: Animalia
- Phylum: Arthropoda
- Clade: Pancrustacea
- Class: Insecta
- Order: Lepidoptera
- Family: Lycaenidae
- Genus: Arhopala
- Species: A. ganesa

Binomial name
- Arhopala ganesa (Moore, 1857)

Synonyms
- Amblypodia ganesa Moore, 1857; Panchala ganesa (Moore, 1857)

= Arhopala ganesa =

Tailless bushblue

Species of butterfly

Arhopala ganesa, the tailless bushblue, is a species of lycaenid or blue butterfly found at the junction of the Palearctic realm and the Indomalayan realm.

== Description ==
The male like all above blue with a narrow black margin, is distinguished by a white patch beyond the apex of the cell. The light dust-grey underside bears bands which are filled in with dark sealing on the forewing and are only indicated by their border-lines on the hindwing. — loomisi Pryer (= seminigra Leech) has the blue reduced above, there is no white on the upperside, and the underside is evenly banded with brown.

== Subspecies ==
- A. g. ganesa Northwest India, Sikkim
- A. g. watsoni Evans, 1912 Assam, Central Burma
- A. g. seminigra (Leech, 1890) West China, Hainan
- A. g. loomisi (Pryer, 1886) Japan
