= Recurrent pyogenic cholangitis =

- Other names: Cholangiohepatitis, Hong Kong disease, Oriental chlangitis, Oriental cholangiohepatitis, biliary obstruction syndrome of the Chinese, Oriental cholangitis
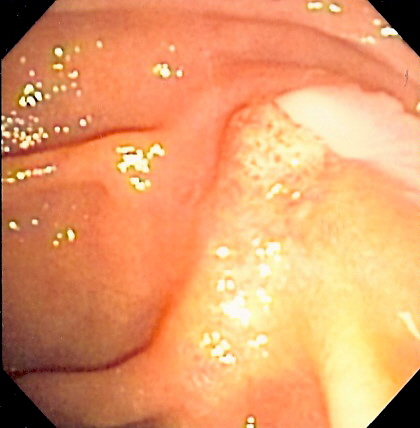
- Cholangitis
- Specialty: General surgery

Recurrent pyogenic cholangitis (RPC), also known as Hong Kong disease, Oriental cholangitis, and Oriental infestational cholangitis, is a chronic infection characterized by recurrent bouts of bacterial cholangitis with primary hepatolithiasis. It is exclusive to people who live or have lived in southeast Asia.

== Presentation ==
Presentation can be atypical and without pain or fever, especially in the elderly. Positive symptoms include biliary colic, acute pancreatitis, obstructive jaundice and less commonly, liver enlargement and abnormal liver function tests. Additional complications in the acute setting include ascending cholangitis, gallbladder empyema, clotting within the hepatic and portal veins, sepsis and death.

Chronic biliary obstruction may cause jaundice, itchiness, liver abscesses, and cirrhosis, particularly at the left lobe segment 3, and can eventually lead to intraductal papillary mucinous neoplasm or cholangiocarcinoma.

== Pathogenesis ==
With RPC, the gallstones found within the biliary system are made of calcium bilirubinate or pigmented calcium. Calcium bilirubinate stones are prevalent in Asia and very rare in Europe and the United States. They tend to be friable concretions of various shapes and sizes within the biliary tree, and their associated bile is often muddy in consistency and contains numerous fine particles of calcium bilirubinate as well. This differs greatly from cholesterol stones, which are common in Europe and the United States. The formation of calcium bilirubinate stones in RPC has been attributed to a high incidence of infection with Escherichia coli in bile. In humans, the majority of bilirubin is excreted in the bile as bilirubin glucuronide.

Hepatolithiasis is associated with Clonorchis sinensis and Ascaris lumbricoides infestation of the liver. This theory is based on high incidence of dead parasites or ova within stone in autopsy findings.

== Diagnosis ==
The diagnosis can be suspected by imaging, with typical characteristics centering around appearance of the liver, typically with CT, ultrasound or MRI. Traits that raise suspicion for the infection include intra- and extra- hepatic dilatation and strictures with intraductal pigmented stones, usually in the absence of gallstones and with regions of segmental liver atrophy, particularly the lateral aspect of the left hepatic lobe. There is also reduced arborization of peripheral ducts. Approximately 5% of chronic infections go on to develop cholangiocarcinoma.

Pathogenic bacteria responsible for the infection include E. coli, Klebsiella, Pseudomonas, and Proteus species. Anaerobes are a less frequent cause, and a culture positive for multiple strains can be common. When related to Clonorchis sinensis, definitive diagnosis is by identification of eggs by microscopic demonstration in faeces or in duodenal aspirate, but other sophisticated methods have been developed, such as ELISA, which has become the most important clinical technique. Diagnosis by detecting DNAs from eggs in faeces are also developed using PCR, real-time PCR, and LAMP, which are highly sensitive and specific.

== Treatment ==
The treatment of RPC involves management of sepsis during episodes of cholangitis with antibiotics, abscess drainage, and blood pressure support. With resistant infection, a surgical hepatectomy or hepaticocutaneousjejunostomy can be performed. Lifelong surveillance for malignancy is also usually necessary.

== See also ==
- Cholangitis
- Cholecystitis
- Clonorchiasis
- Clonorchis sinensis
- Hepaticojejunostomy
- Cirrhosis
