= Ludwig Georg Courvoisier =

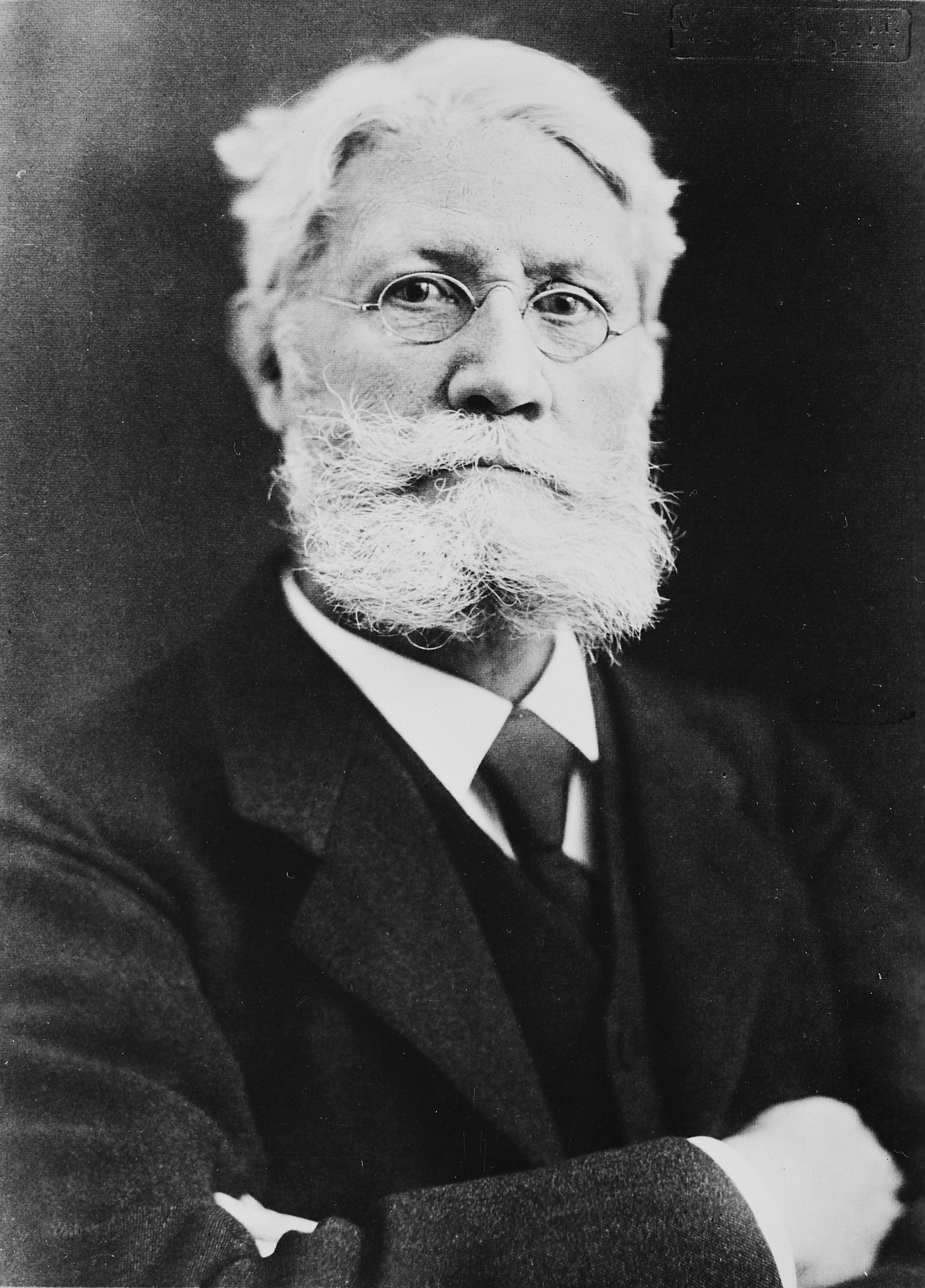
- Born: 8 April 1843
- Died: 10 November 1918 (aged 75)
- Known for: Courvoisier's law
- Scientific career
- Fields: surgery

Ludwig Georg Courvoisier (10 November 1843 – 8 April 1918) was a surgeon from Basel, Switzerland. He was one of the first doctors to remove gallstones from the common bile duct and he described Courvoisier's law, stating that painless gallbladder enlargement is likely to be caused by a disorder other than gallstones.

== Early life and education ==
Courvoisier was born in Basal to Georg Kaufmann, a merchant, and Mary (née Louwndes), who was the daughter of a Welsh clergyman. He lived in Malta for a short time during childhood with his family, where he became proficient in the English language. He returned to Basel for study at the Gymnasium and then at the University of Basel to study medicine. His university education was interrupted by a severe case of typhus, a period of military service in the Austro-Prussian War, and a semester abroad at the University of Göttingen. He was taught by the prominent surgeon August Socin and his thesis titled The Histology of the Sympathetic Nervous System won a prize.

== Medicine ==
Following his graduation as M.D. in 1868, Courvoisier travelled to London to undertake further studies under the supervision of Sir William Ferguson and Sir Thomas Spencer Wells. He then spent a further year in Vienna training under Theodor Billroth and Vincenz Czerny. In 1870, during the Franco-Prussian War, he served on the German side in a military hospital in Karlsruhe. He later returned to Basel, where in 1888 he was appointed a professor of surgery by the University of Basel.

Courvoisier was a pioneer in surgeries pertaining to the biliary tract. In 1890, he published the book Casuistisch-statistische Beiträge zur Pathologie und Chirurgie der Gallenwege, a manual on biliary surgery in which he introduced the medical sign known as Courvoisier's law, which states that painless enlargement of the gallbladder is not likely to be caused by gallstones.

== Entomology ==
Courvoisier first developed an interest in entomology and botany as a young child when his family lived in Malta. As an entomologist, he was most interested in the Lycaenidae. His entomological works include:

- Courvoisier, L. G., 1910. Uebersicht über die um Basel gefundenen Lycaeniden. Verh. naturf. Ges. Basel 21: 153–164.
- Courvoisier, L. G., 1910. Entdeckungsreisen und kritische Spaziergänge ins Gebiet der Lycaeniden. Entomologische Zeitschrift 23 (18): 92–94.
- Courvoisier, L. G., 1912. Javanische Lycaeniden gesammelt von Edw. Jacobson. Tijdschr. Ent. 55: 15–19.
- Courvoisier, L. G. 1912. Ueber Zeichnungs-Aberrationen bei Lycaeniden. Deut. ent. Zeit. [Iris] 26, pp. [38-65, pls 4,5]
- Courvoisier, L. G. 1916. Über Männchenschuppen bei Lycaeniden Verh. naturf. Ges. Basel 26, pp. [11-48, 2 pls]
- Courvoisier, L. G., 1920. Zur Synonymie des Genus Lycaena. Deutsche Entomologische Zeitschrift (Iris) [1914] 28: 143–176; [1920] 34: 230–262.

His butterfly collection and herbarium are held by the Natural History Museum of Basel.
