= L. grandis =

L. grandis may refer to:

- Lasius grandis, an ant species in the genus Lasius
- Lethocerus grandis, a giant water bug species in the genus Lethocerus
- Licuala grandis, the ruffled fan palm, Vanuatu fan palm or Palas palm, a palm tree species native to Vanuatu
- Liocypris grandis, an ostracod species found in the Western Cape of South Africa
- Lonchura grandis, the grand munia, a finch species found in West Papua, Indonesia and Papua New Guinea
- Liphyra grandis, a butterfly species in the genus Liphyra endemic to New Guinea

== Synonyms ==
- Loncheres grandis, a synonym for Toromys grandis, the giant tree rat or white-faced tree rat, a spiny rat species found in Brazil

== See also ==
- Grandis (disambiguation)
