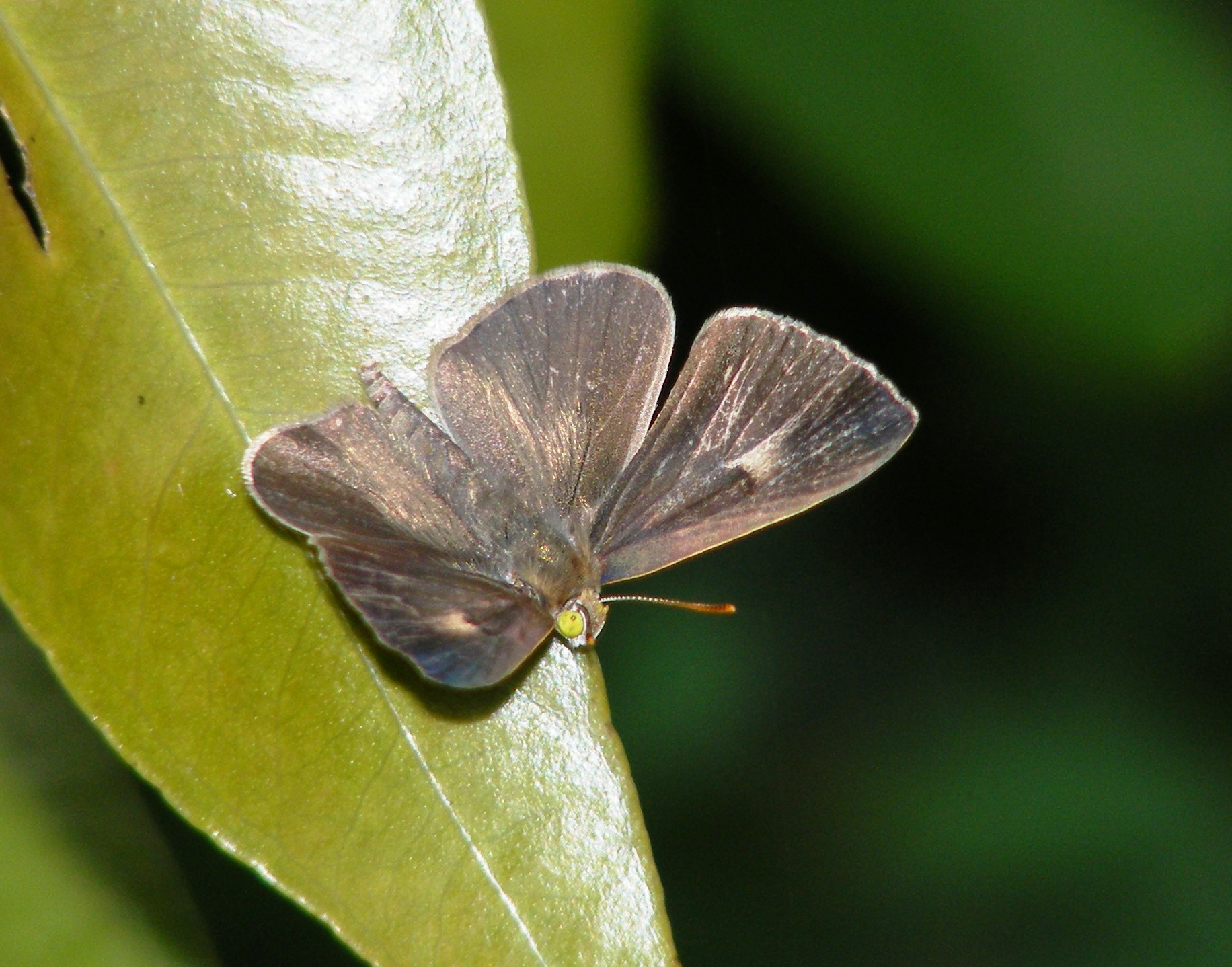
- Upperside
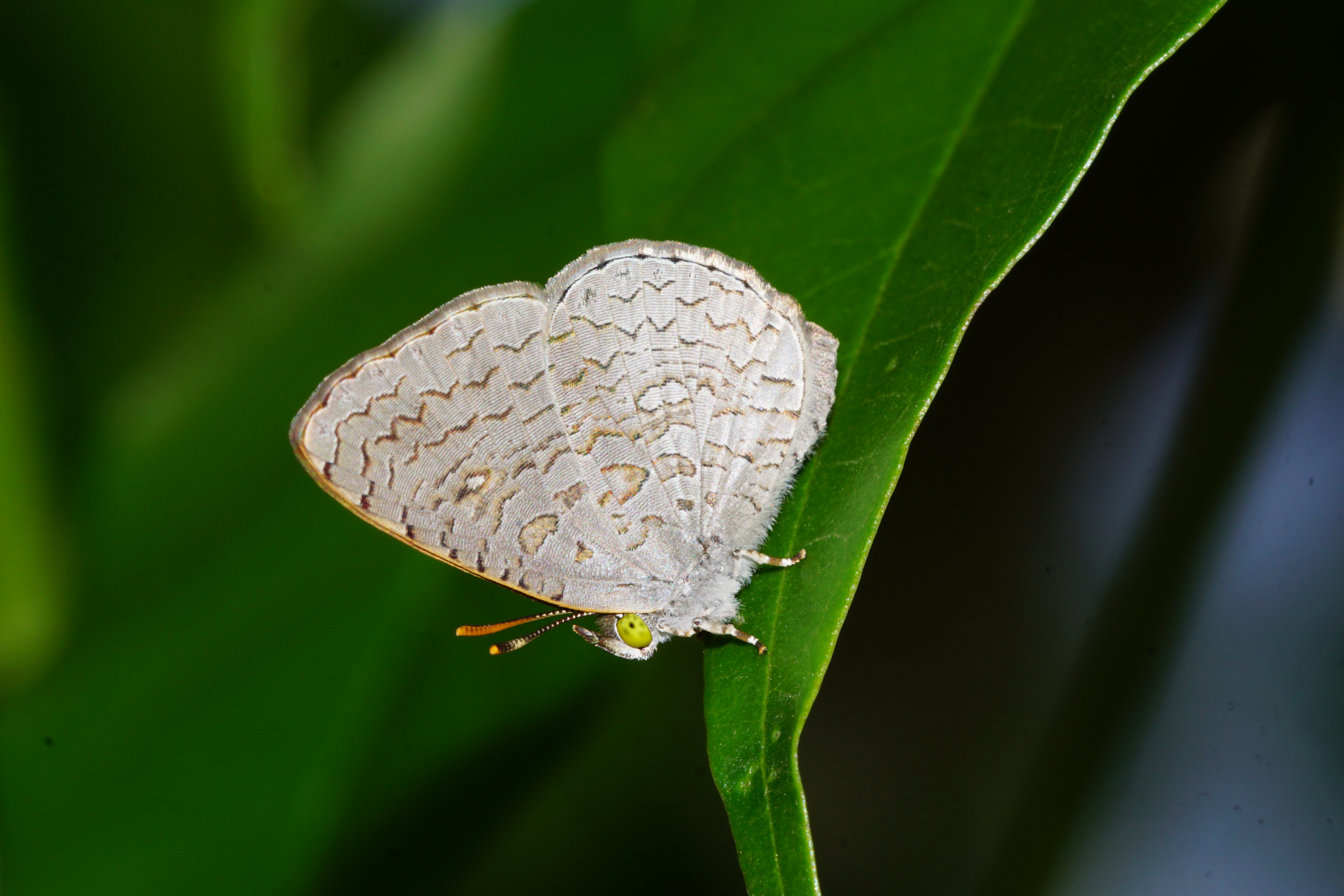
- Underside, Kerala, India

Scientific classification
- Kingdom: Animalia
- Phylum: Arthropoda
- Clade: Pancrustacea
- Class: Insecta
- Order: Lepidoptera
- Family: Lycaenidae
- Genus: Spalgis
- Species: S. epius

Binomial name
- Spalgis epius (Westwood, 1851)

Synonyms
- Geridus epeus Westwood, [1851]; Lucia epius; Spalgis nubilus Moore, [1884]; Lucia fangola Kheil, 1884; Spalgis titius Fruhstorfer, 1919; Lucia substrigata Snellen, 1878; Spalgis strigatus Semper, 1889; Spalgis georgi Fruhstorfer, 1919; Spalgis semperi Fruhstorfer, 1919; Lucia dilama Moore, 1878; Spalgis pharnus Felder, 1860

= Spalgis epius =

Apefly

Species of butterfly

Spalgis epius, commonly known as the apefly, is a small species of butterfly found in the Indomalayan realm that belongs to the lycaenids or blues family. It gets its name from the supposed resemblance of its pupa to the face of an ape.

== Description ==
=== Male ===
Upperside: dull brown, slightly darker towards the apex of the forewing; also a more or less quadrate whitish spot beyond the apex of the cell on the same wing; in some specimens this spot is slightly diffuse. Underside: pale, silky, brownish white; forewings and hindwings crossed by numerous, very slender, short, sinuous, transverse, dark brown strigae which are outwardly slenderly edged with brownish white of a shade paler than that of the ground colour; both wings with an anteciliary dark brown line with on the inner side a similar edging. Forewing, in addition, with an oval white spot beyond the cell. Cilia of both forewings and hindwings of the same shade as the ground colour of the wings. Antenna, head, thorax and abdomen pale brown, club of antennae ochraceous at apex; beneath: the palpi and thorax brownish grey, abdomen pale brown.

=== Female ===
Upperside: slightly paler brown. Forewing: the cell and apex darker; a white spot similar to that in the male but larger, beyond the apex of the cell; in most specimens extended diffusely outwards and downwards. Hindwing: similar to that of the male. Underside: precisely as in the male.

== Life cycle ==
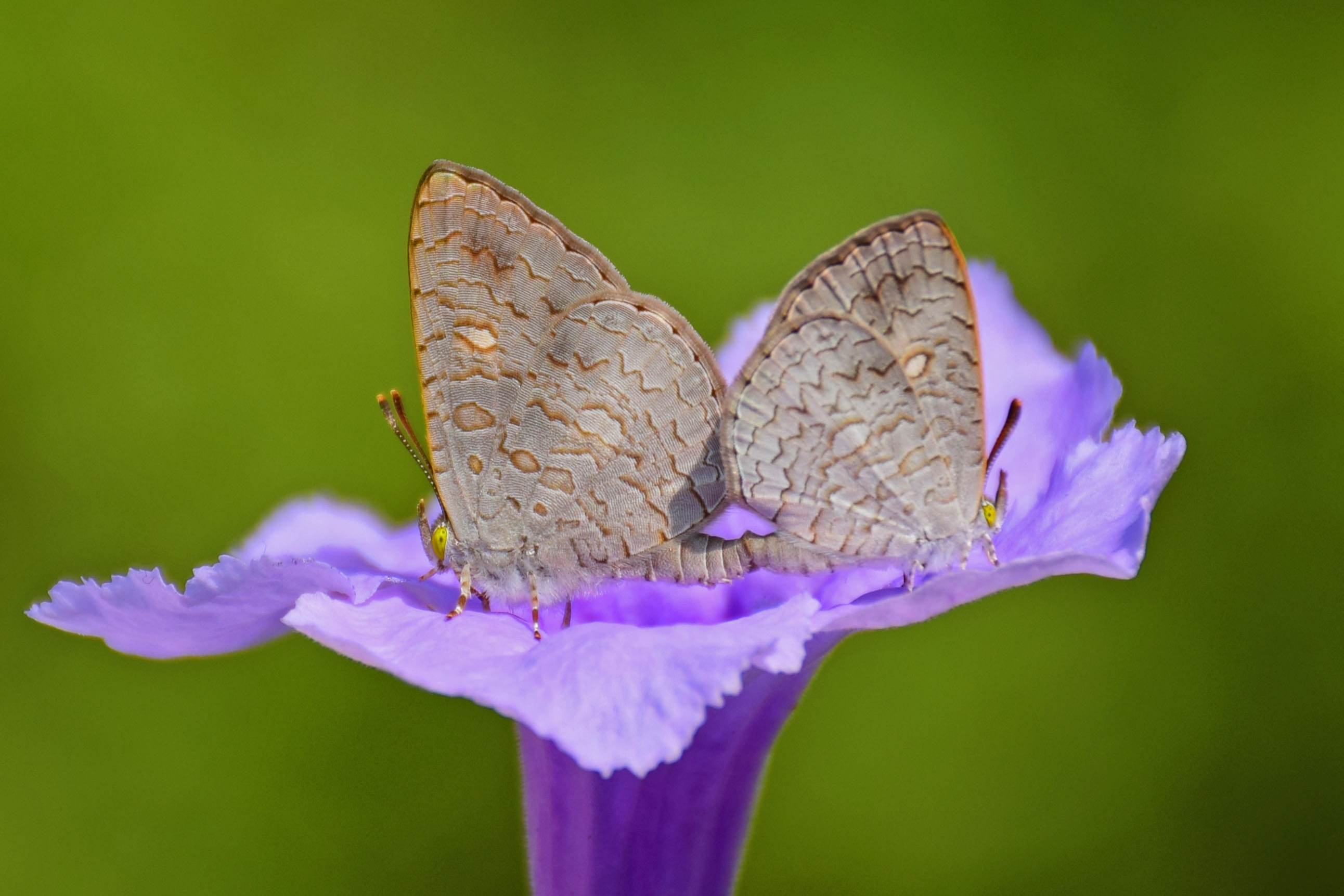
Mating Pair

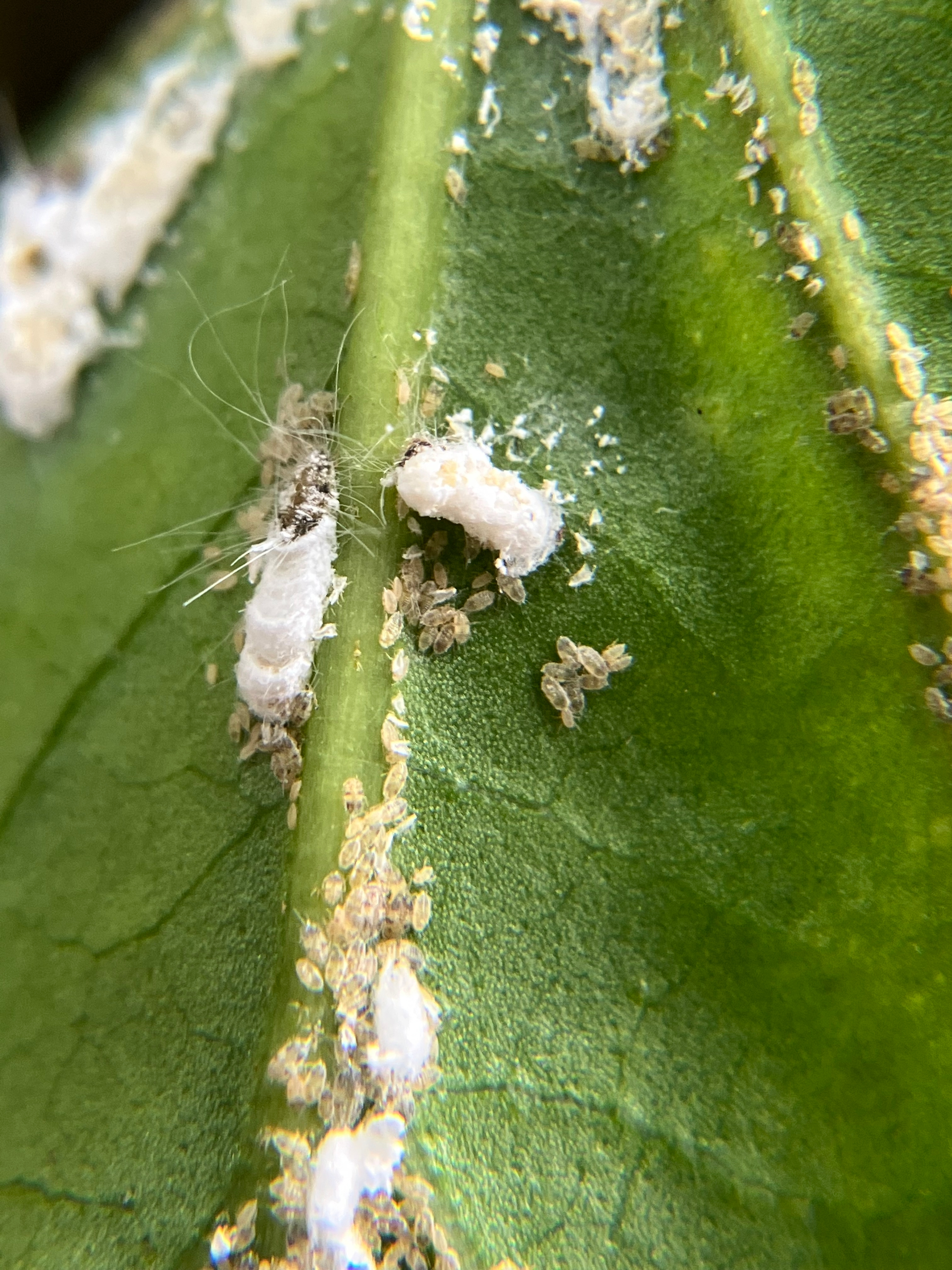
Apefly first-instar caterpillar

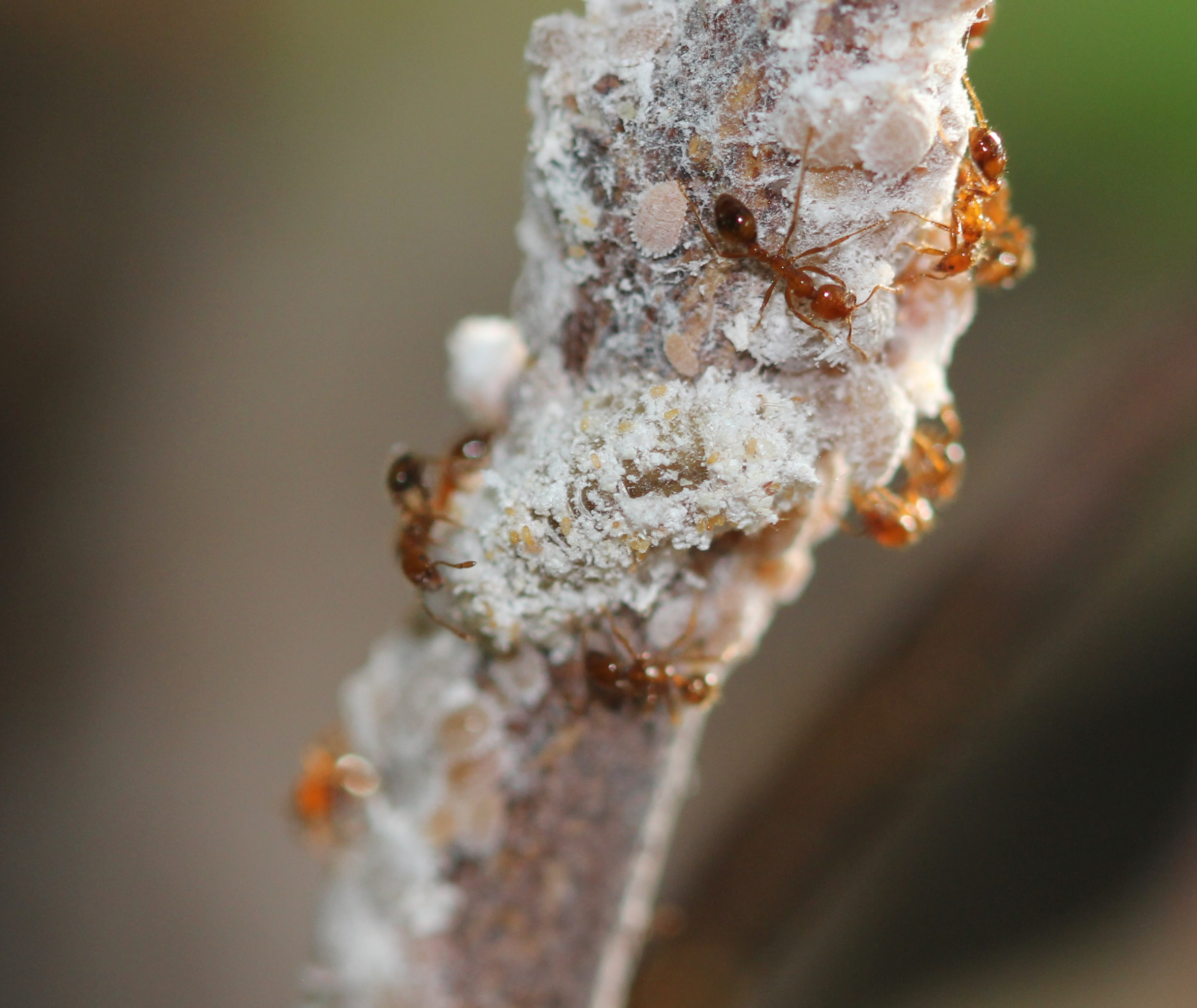
Apefly second-instar caterpillar

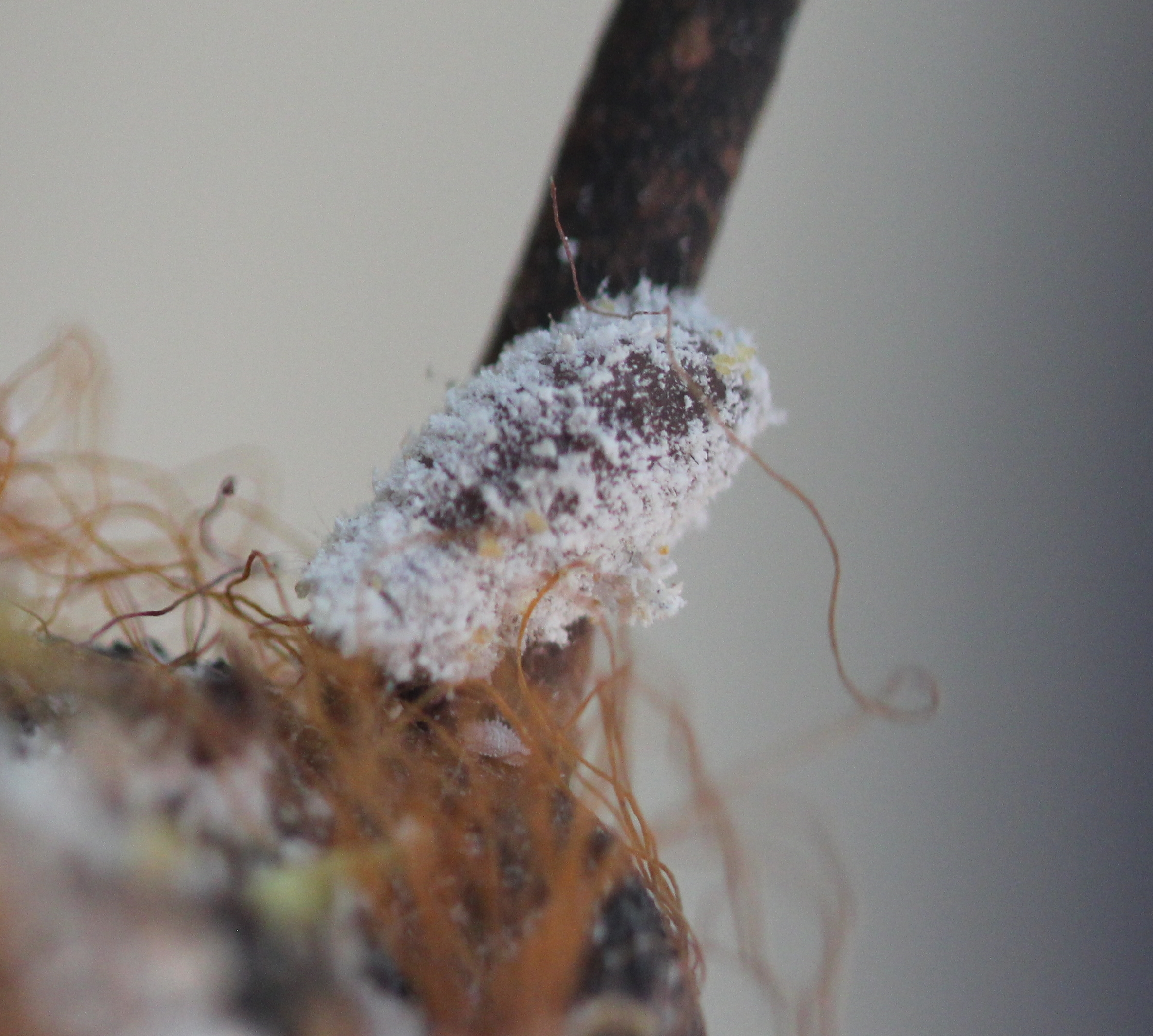
Third-instar caterpillar

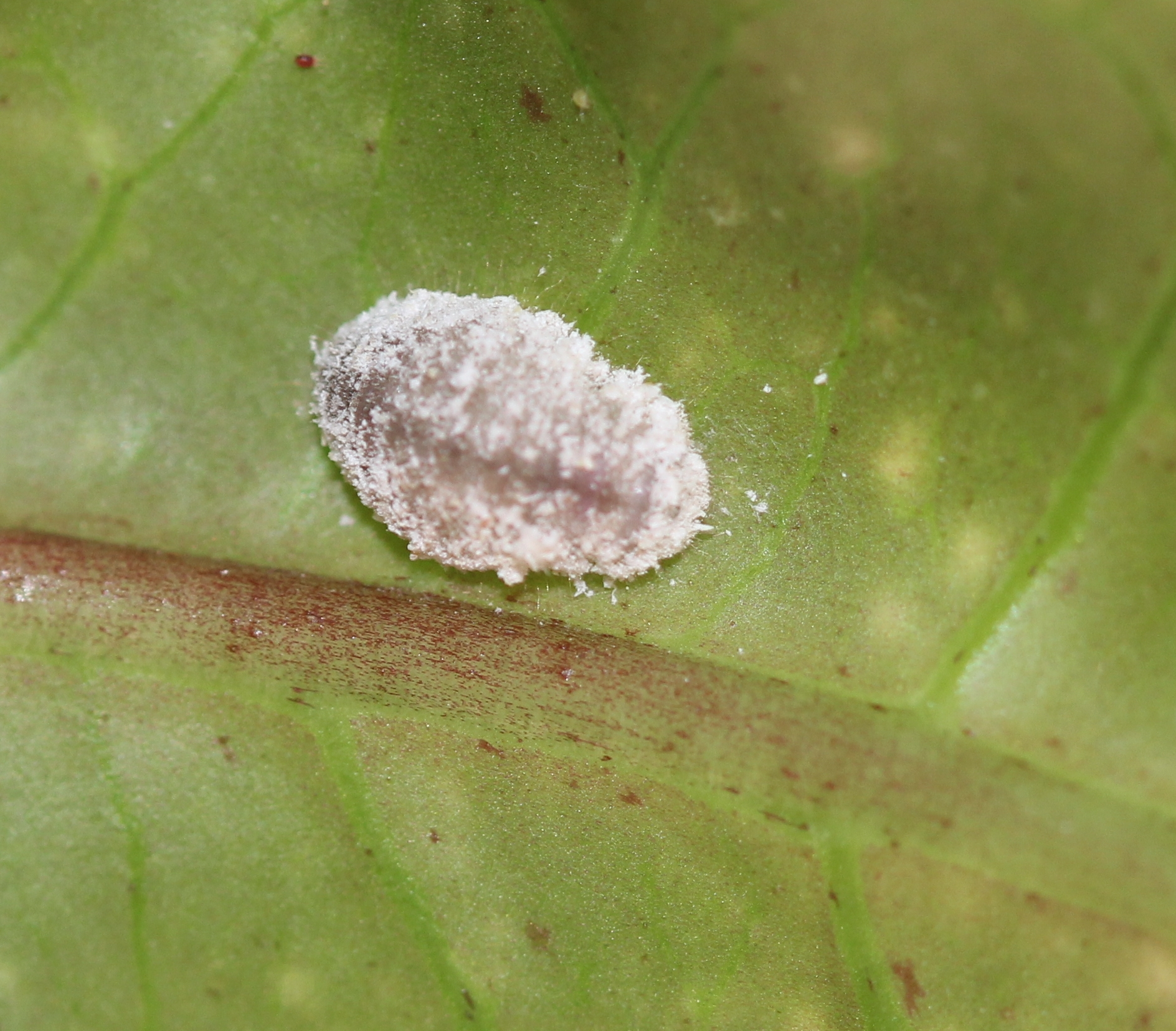
Final-instar caterpillar

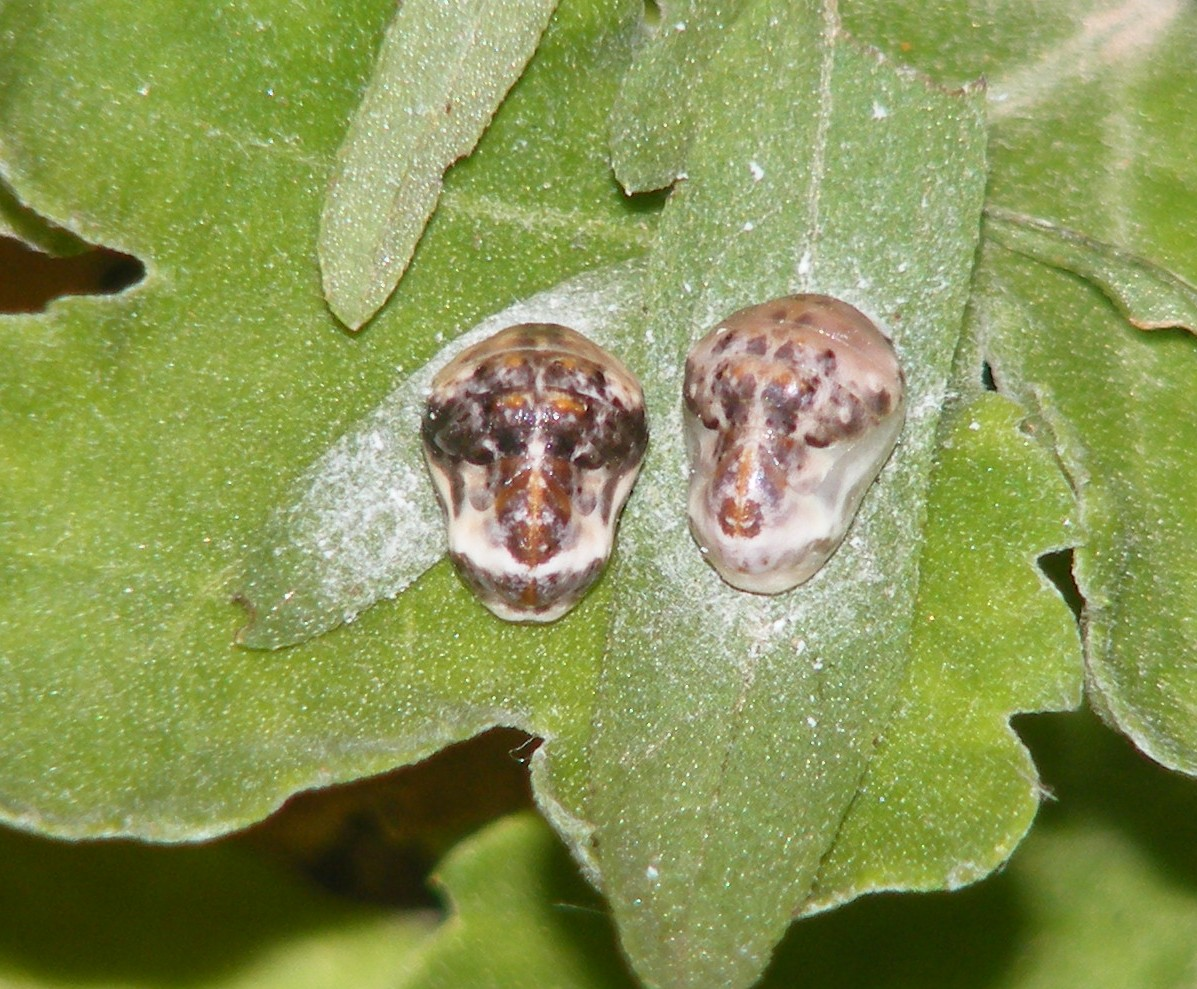
Pupa

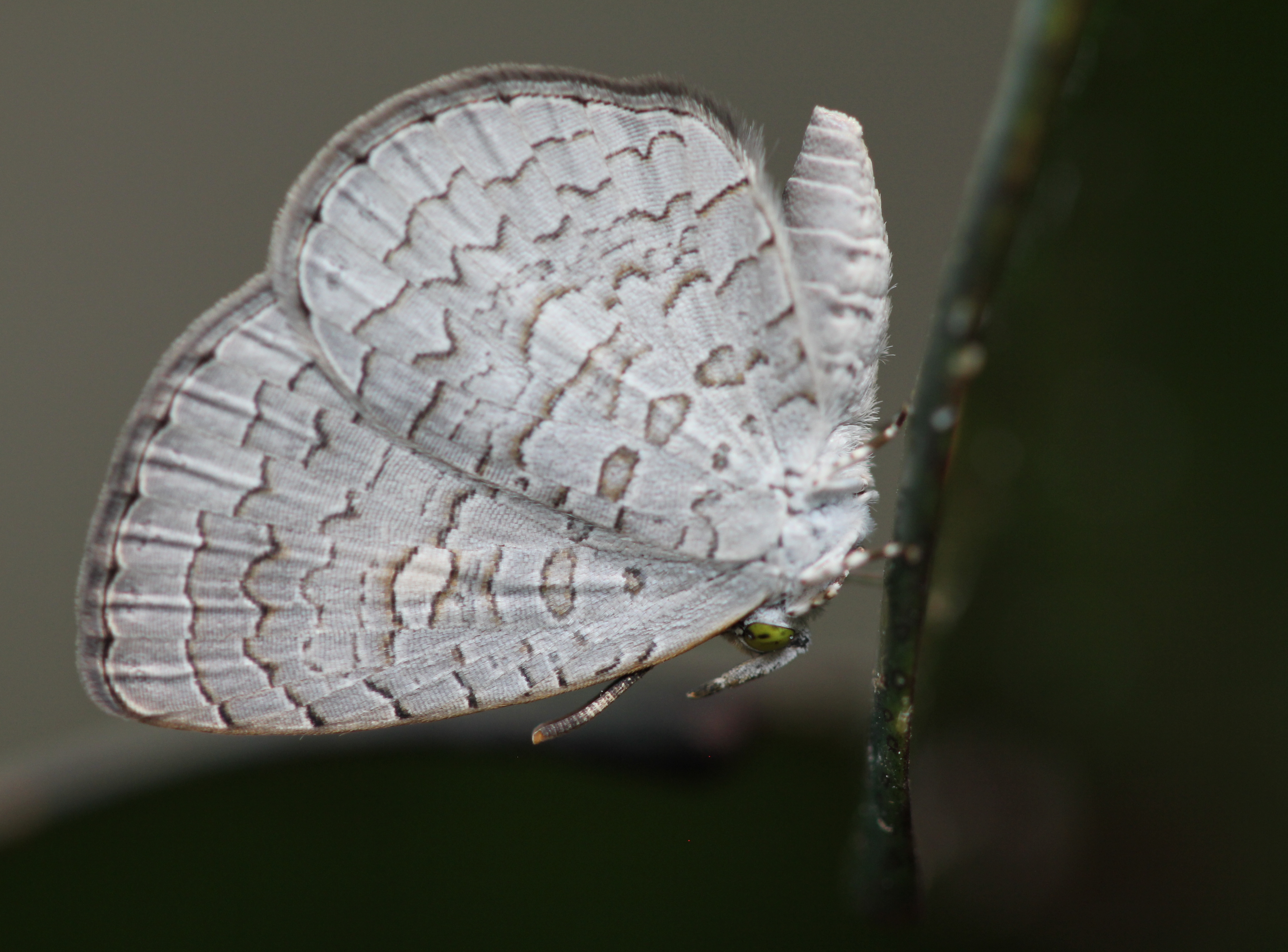
Freshly eclosed apefly butterfly

The caterpillars of this butterfly, like other members of the subfamily Miletinae, are entomophagous and are predators of scale insects like mealybugs. The species unlike many other lycaenid butterflies is not myrmecophilous (it has no mutualistic associations with ants).

Rearing Apefly caterpillars is of potential benefit to control pests such as mealybugs, but apefly adults do not mate in laboratory boxes. They required a tree canopy even within captive settings, and this could be achieved by placing a nylon mesh over a tree. Adults required the canopy to conduct courtship displays and eventual mating. On tree canopies, males set up territories and chased away intruders using displays such as ascending spiral flights. Territorial males kept "neutral spaces" between their individual territories. Copulations, however, were achieved both within and outside territories, with copulating pairs never disturbed when they were intruding into another male's territory. Matings were observed throughout the day, with matings reducing significantly when temperatures reached 36°C and above.

== Subspecies ==
- S. e. epeus (India, Sri Lanka to Peninsular Malaya, Nicobars, Mergui and southern Yunnan)
- S. e. dilama (Moore, 1878) (Taiwan)
- S. e. fangola (Kheil, 1884) (Sumatra, Nias, possibly Borneo)
- S. e. nubilus Moore, [1884] (Andamans, Pulau Tioman)
- S. e. pharnus Felder, 1860 (Kai, Buru, Ambon, Halmahera, West Irian)
- S. e. semperi Fruhstorfer, 1919 (northern Philippines, Luzon)
- S. e. strigatus Semper, 1889 (southern to central Philippines)
- S. e. substrigata (Snellen, 1878) (Sulawesi)
- S. e. titius Fruhstorfer, 1919 (Java, Bali, Sumba, Sumbawa, possibly Damar and Lombok)

== See also ==
- List of butterflies of India (Lycaenidae)
