= Spalgis tintinga =

Scientific classification
- Domain: Eukaryota
- Kingdom: Animalia
- Phylum: Arthropoda
- Class: Insecta
- Order: Lepidoptera
- Family: Lycaenidae
- Genus: Spalgis
- Species: S. tintinga

Binomial name
- Spalgis tintinga (Boisduval, 1833)

Synonyms
- Lycaena tintinga Boisduval, 1833; Miletus docus Druce, 1875

Species of butterfly

Spalgis tintinga is a butterfly in the family Lycaenidae. It is found on Madagascar. The habitat consists of forests.
