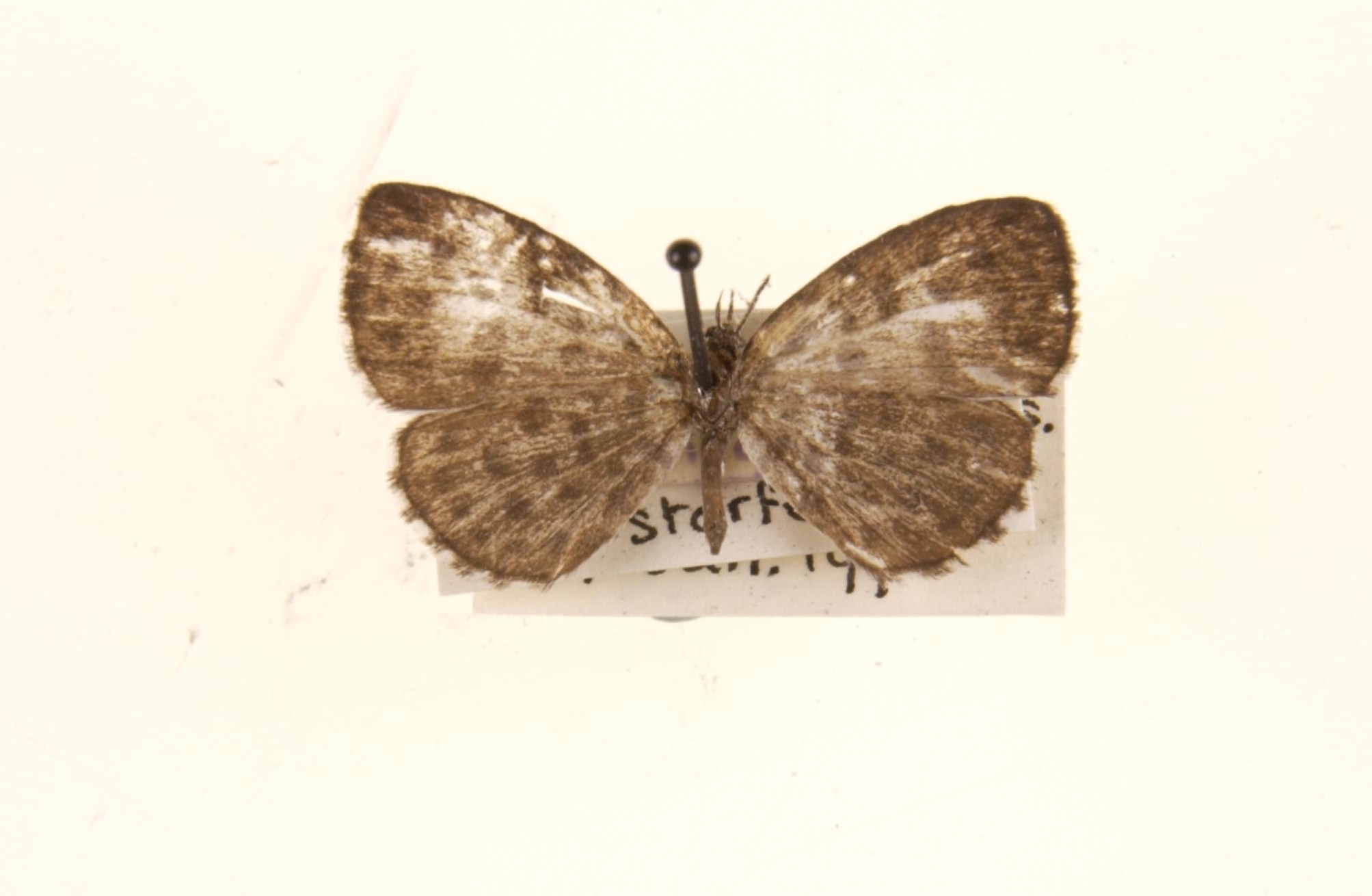
- Upperside of a specimen from Peninsula Malaysia

Scientific classification
- Kingdom: Animalia
- Phylum: Arthropoda
- Class: Insecta
- Order: Lepidoptera
- Family: Lycaenidae
- Genus: Taraka
- Species: T. hamada

Binomial name
- Taraka hamada (Herbert Druce 1875)

= Taraka hamada =

Forest Pierrot

Species of butterfly

Taraka hamada, the forest Pierrot, is a small species of butterfly found in Asia, that belongs to the lycaenids (or blues) family.

== Description ==
The uppersides of its wings are very pale brown in color, somewhat paler in the female, uniform, with the black spots of the underside faintly apparent by transparency. The undersides are white, with round black spots and markings as follows: forewing: a spot at base of wing followed in transverse order by two spots, again two spots, then an irregular row of five spots that crosses near the apex of cell, the lower two coalescent, beyond that another curved row of five spots, two of which are in interspace 3, then a complete curved series of outwardly-pointed and a terminal series of inwardly-pointed similar spots. The spots of the last series cross a well-marked but very slender anteciliary black line, and thus cause the white cilia to the wing to be alternated with black. Hindwing: similarly crossed by five rows, all of which are more or less curved outwards, of black spots, followed by a slender uninterrupted anteciliary black line. Antennae, head, thorax and abdomen brown, shafts of the antennae ringed with white, apex of club ochraceous; beneath: the palpi, thorax and abdomen white.

The butterfly shows two extreme forms in Sikkim, one extreme form which is almost completely black and the other having costa and outer margin black. The black spots from the underside are seen through the upper forewings of both sexes.

== Range ==
The forest Pierrot is found in various regions of Asia; the butterfly occurs in India from Sikkim to Assam and onto Myanmar and south to the Chittagong Hill Tracts. The butterfly also occurs in west and central China, Yunnan, Peninsular Malaysia, Sumatra, Borneo, Java, Japan, and possibly Bali and Lombok.

== Habitat ==
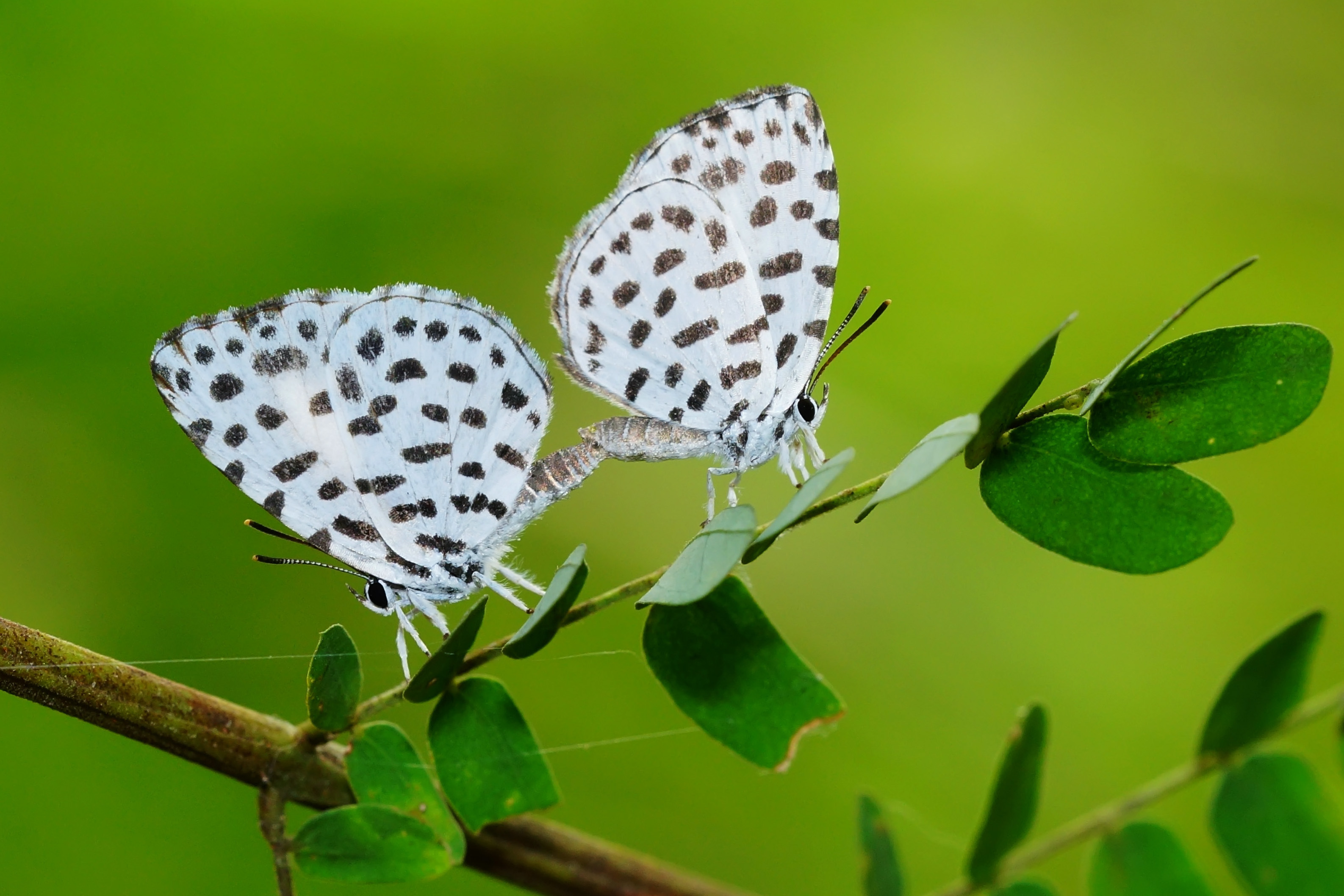
Copulating pair of Taraka haimada thalaba

A weak flying butterfly, found in forests at lower elevations.

== Status ==
Not rare in Sikkim from April to December.

== General reading ==
- Beccaloni, George; Scoble, Malcolm; Kitching, Ian; Simonsen, Thomas; Robinson, Gaden; Pitkin, Brian; Hine, Adrian; Lyal, Chris. "The Global Lepidoptera Names Index (LepIndex)". Natural History Museum, London.
- Evans, W.H. (1932). The Identification of Indian Butterflies (2nd ed.). Mumbai, India: Bombay Natural History Society.
- Haribal, Meena (1992). The Butterflies of Sikkim Himalaya and Their Natural History. Gangtok, Sikkim, India: Sikkim Nature Conservation Foundation.
- "Markku Savela's website on Lepidoptera".
- Wynter-Blyth, Mark Alexander (1957). Butterflies of the Indian Region. Bombay, India: Bombay Natural History Society. ISBN 978-8170192329.

Media related to Taraka hamada at Wikimedia Commons
