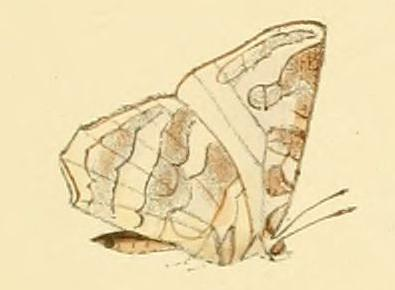

Scientific classification
- Domain: Eukaryota
- Kingdom: Animalia
- Phylum: Arthropoda
- Class: Insecta
- Order: Lepidoptera
- Family: Lycaenidae
- Genus: Euliphyra
- Species: E. leucyania

Binomial name
- Euliphyra leucyania (Hewitson, 1874)

Synonyms
- Liphyra leucyania Hewitson, 1874; Euliphyra sjoestedti Aurivillius, 1895

= Euliphyra leucyania =

Species of butterfly

Euliphyra leucyania, the lesser moth butterfly, is a butterfly in the family Lycaenidae. It is found in Sierra Leone, Liberia, Ivory Coast, Ghana, Togo, southern Nigeria, Cameroon, Gabon, the Republic of the Congo, the Democratic Republic of the Congo (Sankuru), western Uganda and north-western Tanzania. The habitat consists of forests.

Adults have a weak, moth-like flight.

The larvae live in the nests of the ant species Oecophylla longinoda (weaver ant).
