= Spalgis jacksoni =

Scientific classification
- Domain: Eukaryota
- Kingdom: Animalia
- Phylum: Arthropoda
- Class: Insecta
- Order: Lepidoptera
- Family: Lycaenidae
- Genus: Spalgis
- Species: S. jacksoni

Binomial name
- Spalgis jacksoni Stempffer, 1967

Species of butterfly

Spalgis jacksoni is a butterfly in the family Lycaenidae. It is found in Uganda and Tanzania.

== Subspecies ==
- Spalgis jacksoni jacksoni (western Uganda)
- Spalgis jacksoni stempfferi Kielland, 1985 (Tanzania: Kasye and Kefu forests)
