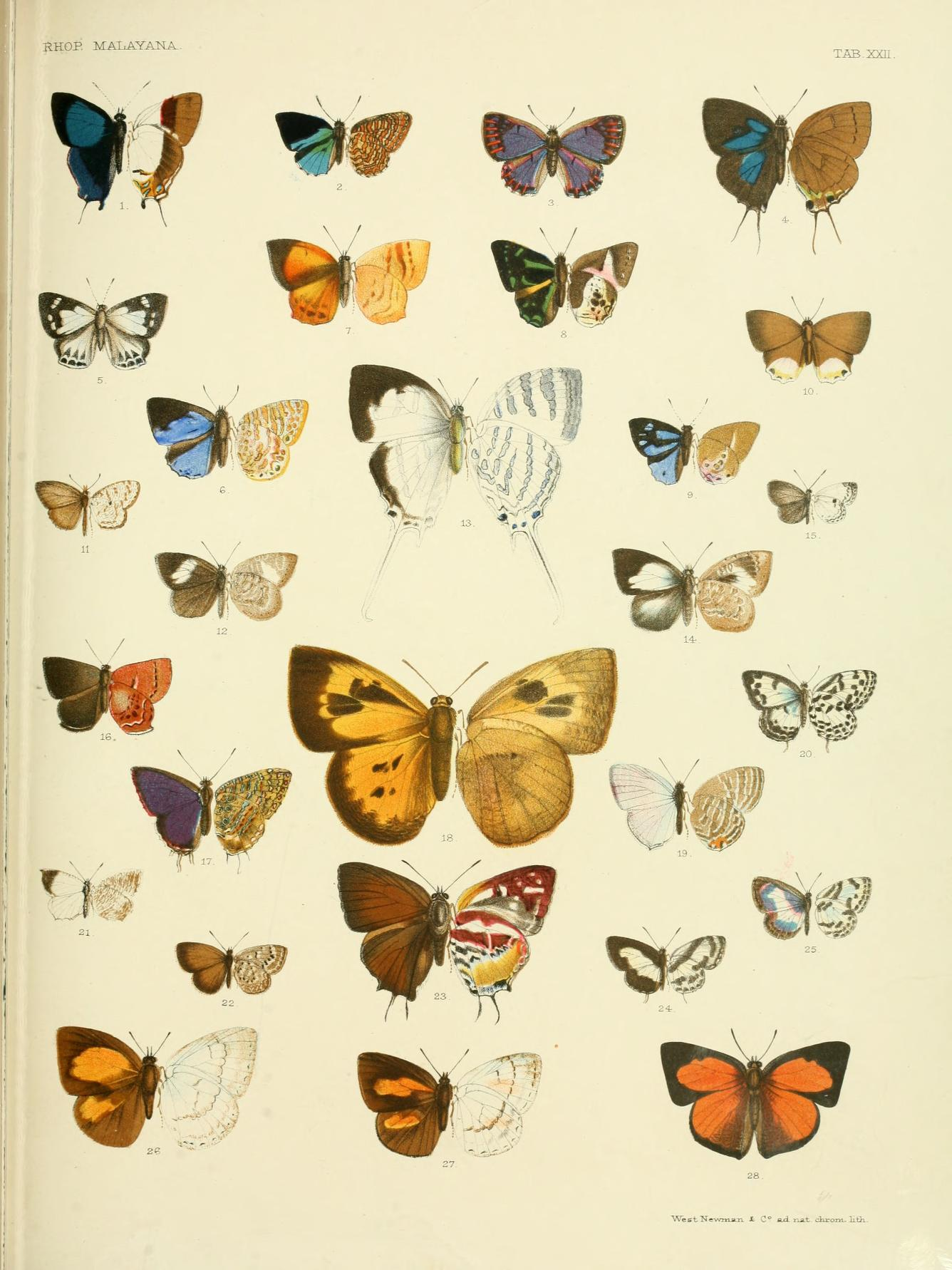
- plate accompanying the original description Logania malayica is figure 21

Scientific classification
- Kingdom: Animalia
- Phylum: Arthropoda
- Class: Insecta
- Order: Lepidoptera
- Family: Lycaenidae
- Genus: Logania
- Species: L. malayica

Binomial name
- Logania malayica Distant, 1884

= Logania malayica =

Species of butterfly

Logania malayica, the Malayan mottle, is a butterfly in the family Lycaenidae. It was described by William Lucas Distant in 1884. It is found in the Indomalayan realm. It is the most conspicuous species of the genus. Above milky bluish-white, forewing with a broad, black distal area. Hindwing only with a delicate, narrow, brown distal line. Beneath densely speckled with red-brown. L. malayica is the only species with an obliquely cut-off costal marginal part, above which the apex projects in the shape of a tip, on the forewing

== Subspecies ==
- L. m. malayica Thailand, Malay Peninsula, Borneo, Sumatra
- L. m. subura Fruhstorfer, 1914 Philippines

== Biology ==
The larva is associated with the aphid genus Pseudoregma.
