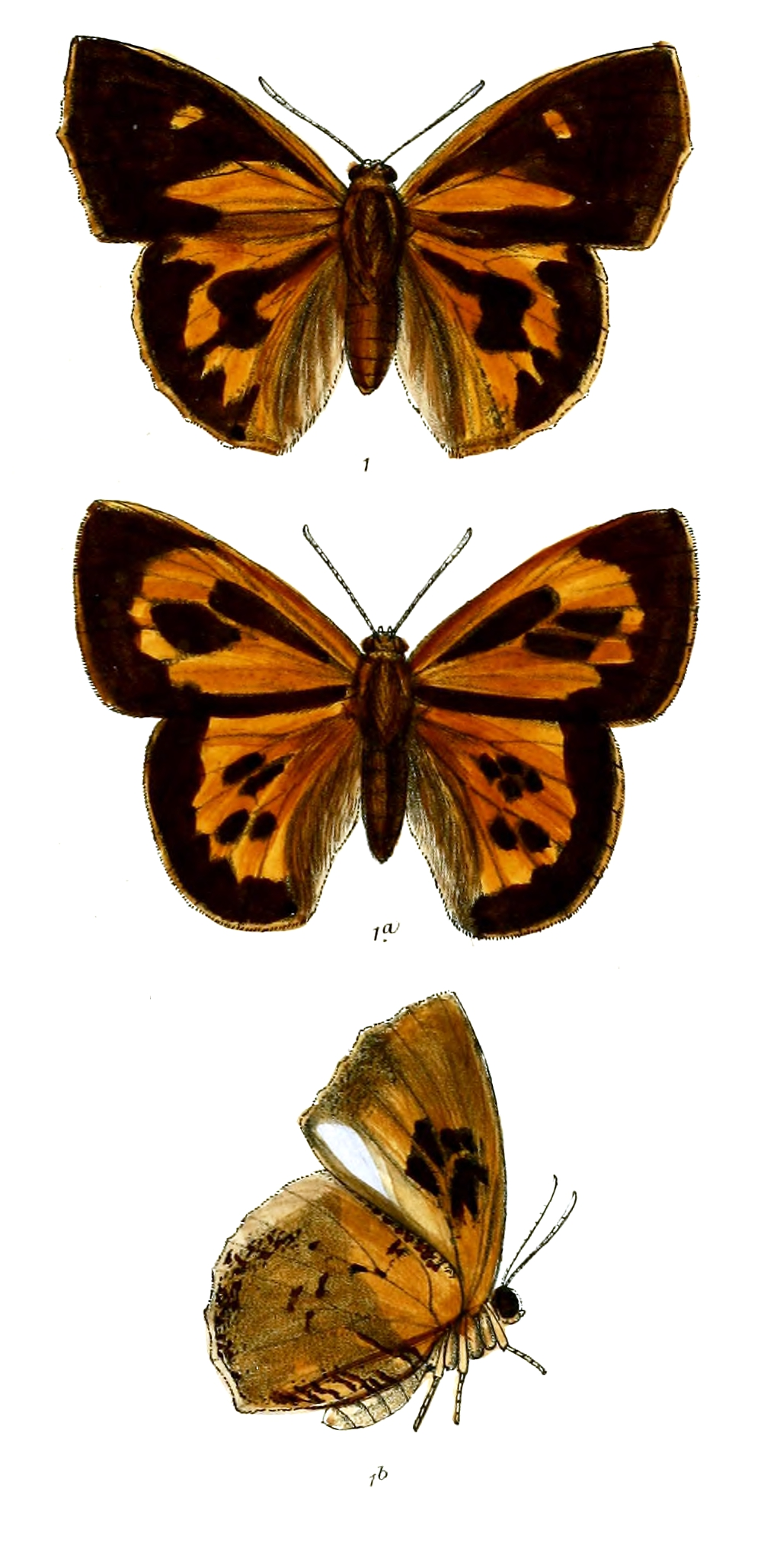
- Male (top), female and male underside
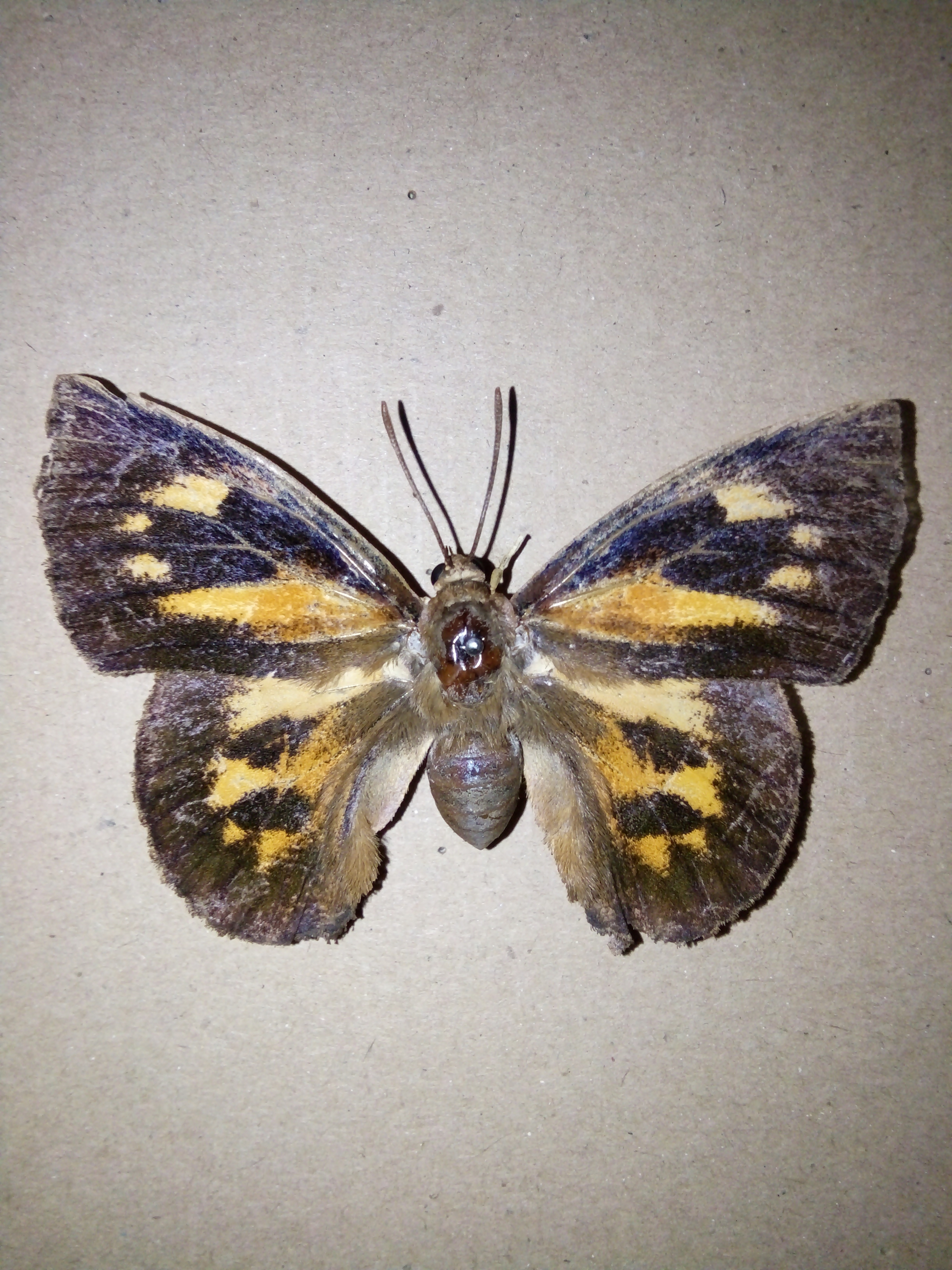
- L. b. robusta, female from Ombulodata, North Gorontalo, Sulawesi

Scientific classification
- Domain: Eukaryota
- Kingdom: Animalia
- Phylum: Arthropoda
- Class: Insecta
- Order: Lepidoptera
- Family: Lycaenidae
- Genus: Liphyra
- Species: L. brassolis

Binomial name
- Liphyra brassolis Westwood 1864

= Liphyra brassolis =

Moth butterfly

Species of butterfly

Liphyra brassolis, also known as the moth butterfly, is a butterfly found in South Asia, Southeast Asia and Australia that belongs to the lycaenid family. The larvae are predatory and feed on ant larvae. This is one of the largest species of lycaenid butterflies. Several disjunct populations across its wide distribution range are considered as subspecies. Never a common butterfly, specimens of this species are highly prized by collectors.

== Description ==
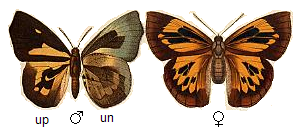

Forewing: costa arched; apex subacute; termen convex; tornus rounded; dorsum sinuate, ciliated, about three-fourths the length of the costa; cell about half the length of the wing; vein 6 out of 7 beyond apex of cell, upper discocellular therefore absent, middle and lower discocellulars subequal, vertical; vein 7 ends on termen well below apex of wing; vein 8 out of 7, from apical half, ends on costa before apex of wing; vein 9 out of 7 from just before middle; veins 10 and 11 free; vein 12 terminates well beyond end of cell on costa.

Hindwing: irregularly pear shaped; costa slightly but widely angulated near base, then straight to apex; termen strongly rounded, tornus well marked, produced into a lobe; dorsum long, slightly convex; cell about half length of wing; middle discocellular short, concave, lower twice length of middle, strongly oblique; vein la very short, ends before middle of dorsum: vein 3 from well before lower apex of cell; vein 7 at base much closer to apex of cell than to base of wing; vein 8 very slightly arched near base, then straight to apex of wing. Antennae about half length of forewing, no distinct club but gradually increasing to apex; palpi porrect (forward pointing), gradually tapering to apex, third joint of moderate length, as thick at base as apex of second joint; eyes naked; body heavy and robust, reminding one in its stoutness of the body of Charaxes.

== Habits ==
Liphyra brassolis grows in the nests of ants, especially of tree ants (Oecophylla smaragdina and other species). The caterpillar has tiny antennae-like structures whose function is not known. The adult butterfly at emergence is covered in grey powdery scales which protect it from the ants. Eggs are laid singly or in groups of about six, on the underside of branches of a tree with ants' nest. The eggs are tiny pale green cylinders of 1 mm height.

== Distribution ==
The species occurs from India to the Philippines, including the tropical coast of Western Australia, the Northern Territory and Queensland.

== Life history ==
=== Egg ===
"Very unlike that of other Lycaenidae but shows an unexpected resemblance to that of Logania, Distant, and Taraka, Doherty. It is of great size, green overlaid with white, shaped something like a section or drum of a Doric column but somewhat widest at the base, the height, breadth at apex and breadth at base being to each other as 9, 13 and 15.5. The top is marked with hexagonal reticulations, the lines turbinate in the middle, the margin deeply channeled and then strongly carinate. Sides crusted with white and minutely indented with about forty-five vertical ribs, slightly irregular and even (very rarely) anastomosing, extending also over the outer part of the base, the inner part being green and minutely reticulated with hexagons." (Doherty)

=== Larva ===
Oval flattened and slug like with a hard and smooth covering. The caterpillars can devour the entire broods of green ant nests. The protective orange carapace is virtually impervious to the bites of soldier ants and it is so heavy that the ants cannot flip it over to get at the caterpillar's soft underbody. Once the caterpillar transforms into a butterfly inside the nest, its soft body is vulnerable to the ants who can swarm and dismember intruders. However, as the butterfly quickly moves toward an exit, it is protected by white scales from its new wings; the scales are slippery enough to prevent most ants from getting a foothold and these scales stick to the ants' jaws, disorienting and distracting them.

"The jaws would most effectively take hold of the skin of an ant larva, piercing its skin at the same time in six places; they would then draw the piece so seized within the closed cavity formed between the labrum, labium and (laterally) maxillae so that the juices of the larva could be easily sucked out." (T. A. Chapman)

=== Pupa ===
"The pupa inside lies quite free from any attachment to the skin, but the ventral depression of the pupa is due to its having to fit on the ventral aspect of the larval skin, which is raised centrally by the head, legs, prolegs etc. The larval skin dehisces by cracking round the marginal crest in front, by a crack across the front of the three ridges, i.e. between third and fourth abdominal segments. The semicircular portion thus marked off again divides longitudinally into two portions." (T. A. Chapman)
