= Euliphyra hewitsoni =

Scientific classification
- Domain: Eukaryota
- Kingdom: Animalia
- Phylum: Arthropoda
- Class: Insecta
- Order: Lepidoptera
- Family: Lycaenidae
- Genus: Euliphyra
- Species: E. hewitsoni

Binomial name
- Euliphyra hewitsoni Aurivillius, 1899

Species of butterfly

Euliphyra hewitsoni, the western moth butterfly, is a butterfly in the family Lycaenidae. It is found in Senegal, Guinea, Sierra Leone, Liberia, Ivory Coast, Ghana, southern Nigeria and Cameroon. The habitat consists of forests.

Adults have a moth-like flight.

The larvae live in the nests of ants of the genus Oecophylla and feed on ant regurgitations and/or ant brood.

The name honours William Chapman Hewitson.
