= Lontalius =

Scientific classification
- Domain: Eukaryota
- Kingdom: Animalia
- Phylum: Arthropoda
- Class: Insecta
- Order: Lepidoptera
- Family: Lycaenidae
- Subfamily: Miletinae
- Tribe: Miletini
- Genus: Lontalius; Eliot, 1986
- Species: L. eltus

Binomial name
- Lontalius eltus Eliot, 1986

Monotypic butterfly genus in family Lycaenidae

Lontalius is a monotypic butterfly genus in the family Lycaenidae. Its single species, Lontalius eltus, is found in Borneo and the Philippines. Both the genus and species were first described by John Nevill Eliot in 1986.
