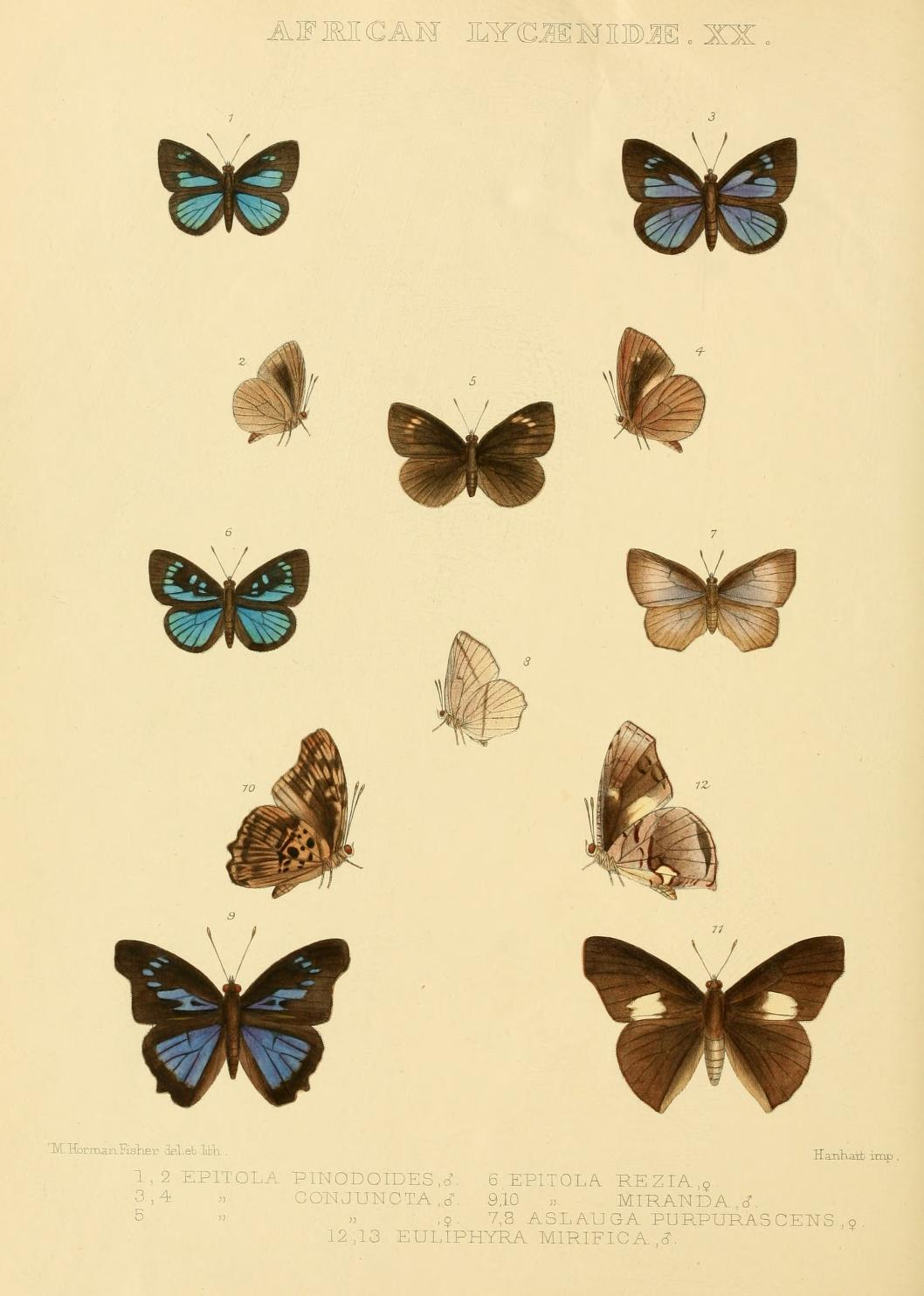
- Euliphyra mirifica figures 11 and 12 (bottom right)

Scientific classification
- Domain: Eukaryota
- Kingdom: Animalia
- Phylum: Arthropoda
- Class: Insecta
- Order: Lepidoptera
- Family: Lycaenidae
- Subfamily: Miletinae
- Tribe: Liphyrini
- Genus: Euliphyra; Holland, 1890

= Euliphyra =

Butterfly genus in family Lycaenidae

Euliphyra is a genus of butterflies in the family Lycaenidae.

== Species ==
- Euliphyra hewitsoni Aurivillius, 1899
- Euliphyra leucyania (Hewitson, 1874)
- Euliphyra mirifica Holland, 1890
