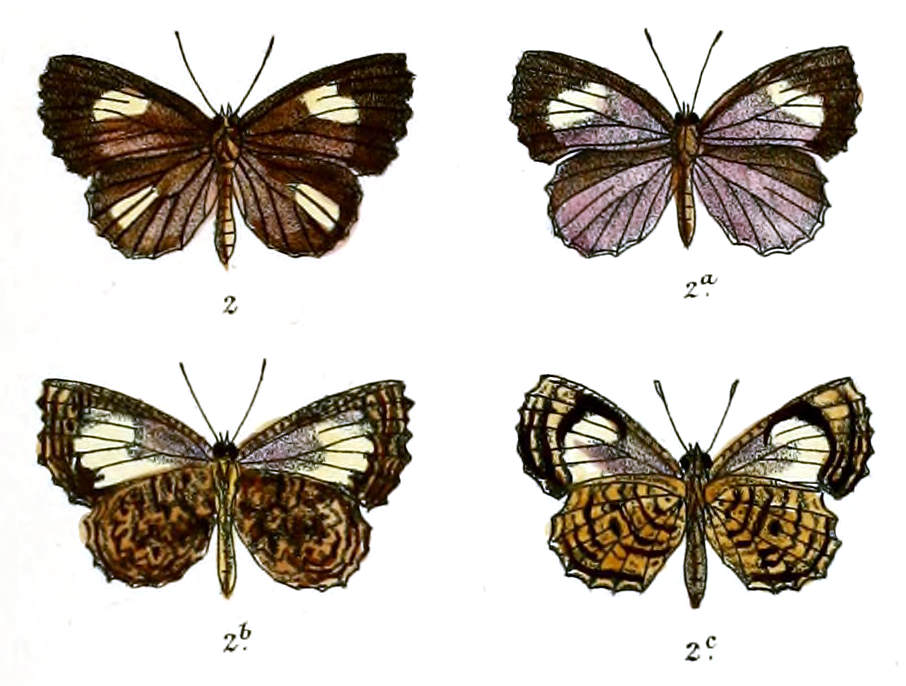
- Illustration in Charles Swinhoe's Lepidoptera Indica

Scientific classification
- Domain: Eukaryota
- Kingdom: Animalia
- Phylum: Arthropoda
- Class: Insecta
- Order: Lepidoptera
- Family: Lycaenidae
- Genus: Logania
- Species: L. watsoniana

Binomial name
- Logania watsoniana de Nicéville 1898

= Logania watsoniana =

Watson's mottle

Species of butterfly

Logania watsoniana, or Watson's mottle, is a small but striking butterfly found in India that belongs to the lycaenids or blues (family Lycaenidae). The species was first described by Lionel de Nicéville in 1898.

== Description ==
Male upperside: white. Forewing: apex and termen very broadly brownish black, the inner margin of the black area angulated outwards in the middle of interspace 3, the basal third of the wing suffused with very pale greyish-blue, the costal and dorsal margins up to the black area sullied with pale brownish. Hindwing: the costal area from base to termen in a line above the cell brownish black, the white on the posterior half of the wing more or less stained and sullied with brownish. Underside: white. Forewing: costa and apex mottled with brownish, termen broadly brownish black, cell from base with a broad diffuse fuscous patch that extends below the median vein and outwards on to the disc. Hindwing: densely and more or less uniformly mottled with fuscous brownish-black. Antennae, head, thorax aud abdomen fuscous brown above and beneath.

Female upperside: similar to that of the male, but differs as follows: Forewing: base outwardly to beyond the cell strongly suffused with bluish grey, only the upper apex of the white area with the ground colour distinctly showing through; apex and termen more broadly and more densely black. Hindwing: entirely bluish grey, the costal margin broadly irrorated with dusky scales. Underside: as in the male, but the costa, apex and termen broadly in the forewing, as well as the whole surface of the hindwing, mottled with brownish; the scaling of this colour forms irregular spots and patches especially on the hindwing, which has a blotched appearance compared with the same wing in the male. The basal fuscous cloud extends into the medial white area in the forewing as in the male. Antennae, head, thorax and abdomen similar to those of the male.

== Range ==
This species resides in Manipur, Myanmar and Laos.

== See also ==
- List of butterflies of India
- List of butterflies of India (Lycaenidae)
