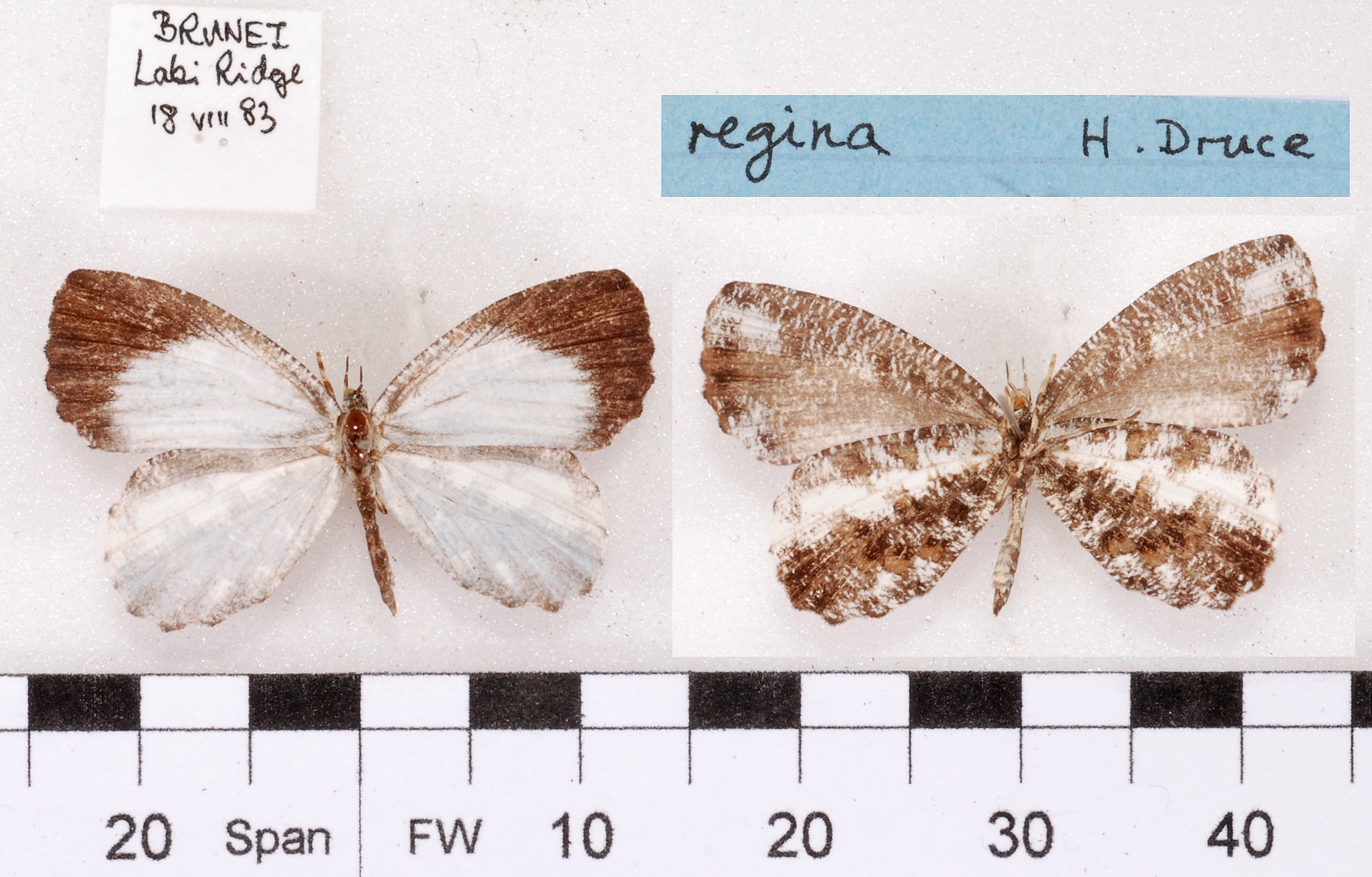

Scientific classification
- Kingdom: Animalia
- Phylum: Arthropoda
- Class: Insecta
- Order: Lepidoptera
- Family: Lycaenidae
- Genus: Logania
- Species: L. regina

Binomial name
- Logania regina H. Druce, 1873

Synonyms
- Miletus regina Druce, 1873; Logania evora Fruhstorfer, 1914; Logania sriwa Distant, 1886

= Logania regina =

Species of butterfly

Logania regina is a butterfly in the family Lycaenidae. It was described by Herbert Druce in 1873. It is found in the Indomalayan realm.occurs in Borneo beside L. sriwa [now subspecies of reginaand differs from sriwa, according to the statements by H. H. Druce, by the inner marginal zone of the forewing beneath remaining white

== Subspecies ==
- Logania regina regina (Malaysia, Borneo, Philippines: Sula Islands)
- Logania regina sriwa Distant, 1886 (Sumatra, southern Burma, Thailand)
