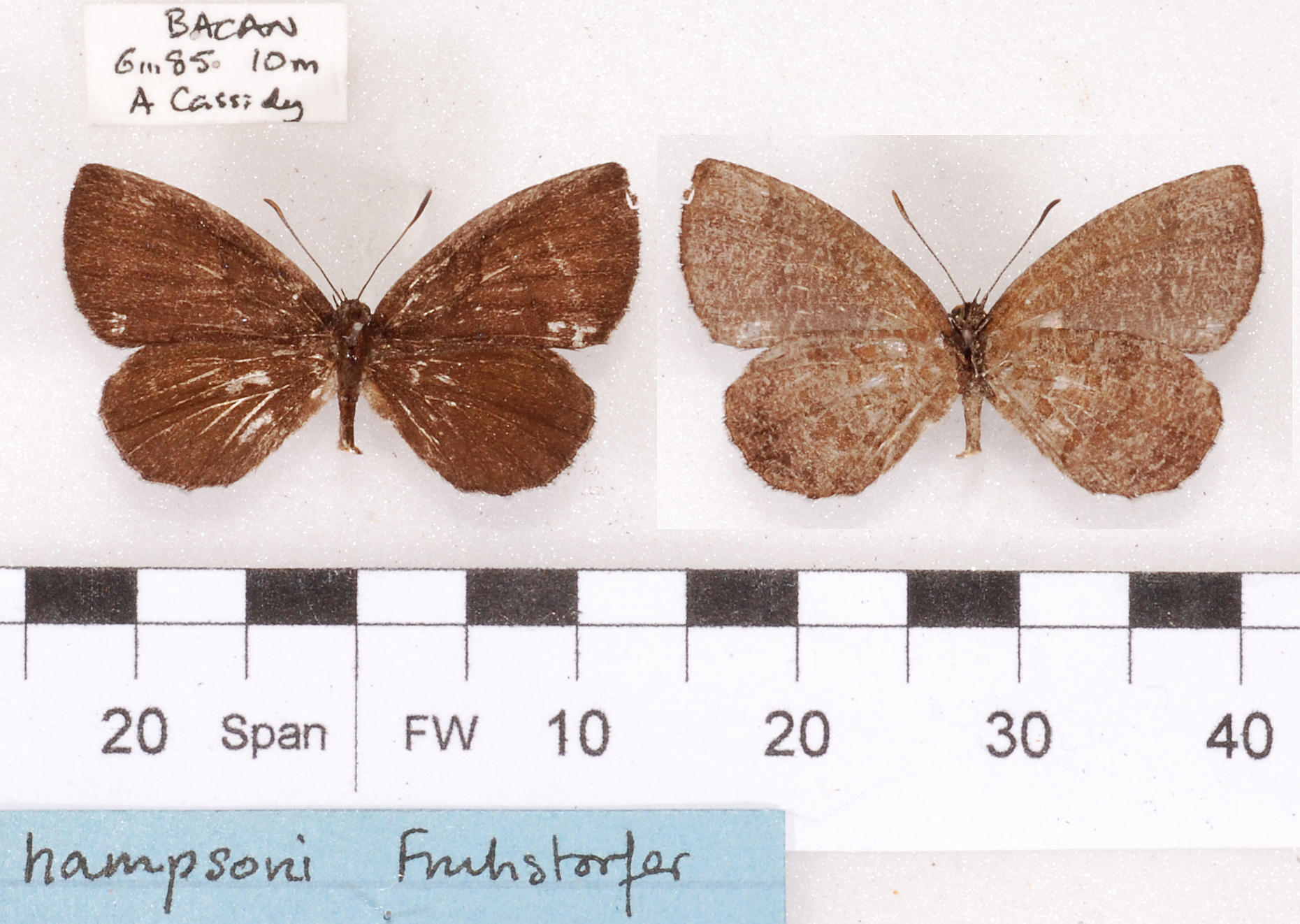
- Logania hampsoni

Scientific classification
- Kingdom: Animalia
- Phylum: Arthropoda
- Class: Insecta
- Order: Lepidoptera
- Family: Lycaenidae
- Subfamily: Miletinae
- Tribe: Miletini
- Genus: Logania; Distant, 1884

= Logania (butterfly) =

Butterfly genus in family Lycaenidae

Logania is a genus of butterflies in the family Lycaenidae.

The genus is shared the between the Indomalayan realm and the Australasian realm, ranging from Burma to New Guinea.

== Species ==
- Logania distanti Semper, 1889
- Logania dumoga Cassidy, 1995 Sulawesi
- Logania hampsoni Frühstorfer, 1914 Papua New Guinea
- Logania malayica Distant, 1884
- Logania marmorata Moore, 1884
- Logania nehalemia Frühstorfer, 1914 West Irian, Indonesia,
- Logania obscura (Röber, 1886)
- Logania paluana Eliot, 1986 Sulawesi
- Logania regina Druce, 1873)
- Logania waltraudae Eliot, 1986 Philippines
- Logania watsoniana de Nicéville, 1898
