= Megalopalpus angulosus =

Scientific classification
- Domain: Eukaryota
- Kingdom: Animalia
- Phylum: Arthropoda
- Class: Insecta
- Order: Lepidoptera
- Family: Lycaenidae
- Genus: Megalopalpus
- Species: M. angulosus

Binomial name
- Megalopalpus angulosus Grünberg, 1910

Species of butterfly

Megalopalpus angulosus, the Grünberg's harvester, is a butterfly in the family Lycaenidae. It is found in Nigeria (the Cross River loop), Cameroon, Equatorial Guinea and the Democratic Republic of the Congo (the western part of the country and Kasai). The habitat consists of forests.
