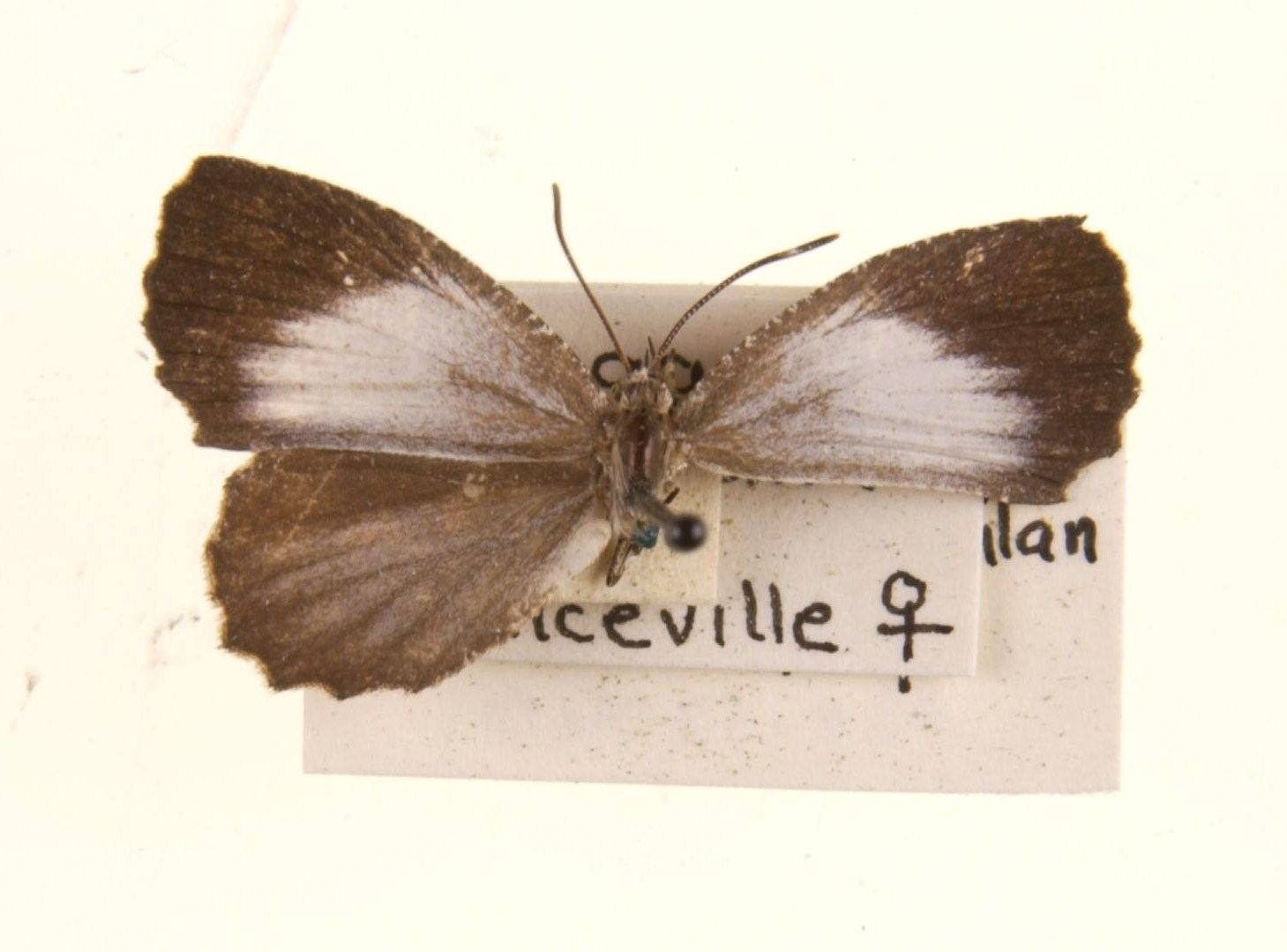
- Specimen from Malaya

Scientific classification
- Kingdom: Animalia
- Phylum: Arthropoda
- Clade: Pancrustacea
- Class: Insecta
- Order: Lepidoptera
- Family: Lycaenidae
- Genus: Logania
- Species: L. distanti

Binomial name
- Logania distanti Semper, 1889

Synonyms
- Logania massalia Doherty, 1891

= Logania distanti =

Dark mottle

Species of butterfly

Logania distanti, the dark mottle, is a small but striking butterfly found in India that belongs to the lycaenids or blues (family Lycaenidae). It was first described by Georg Semper in 1889.

== Description ==
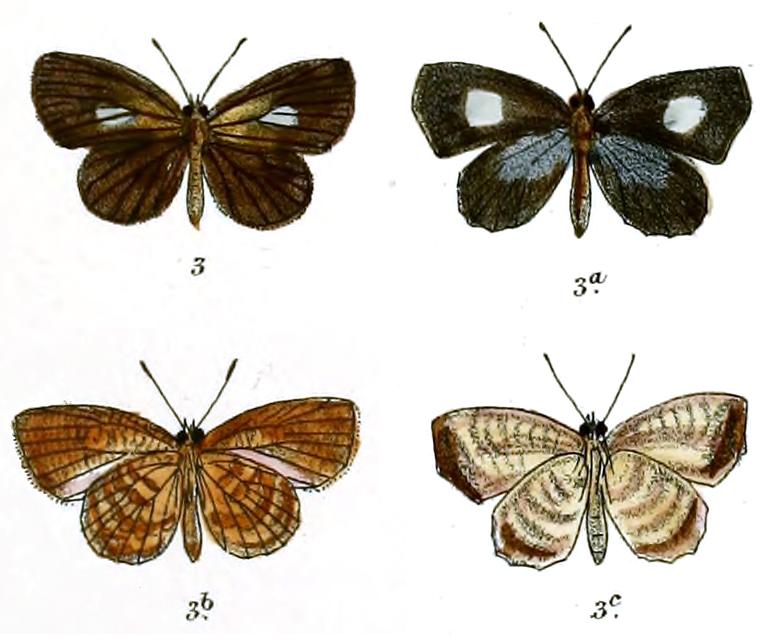

=== Male ===
Upperside dark brown. Forewing: a medial dull whitish spot at base of interspace 3 extended upwards on to vein 4 and below into interspace 2. Hindwing; uniform, immaculate. Underside: very pale dull brown, with darker brown mottlings and striae, that on the forewing are absent on a broad streak from base outwards along the basal half of the dorsum, this area pale brown without markings; a dark obscure spot at apex of cell and an incomplete similarly obscure dark transverse discal band. On the hindwing the mottlings coalesce and form three or four very ill-defined, obscure, transverse, somewhat broad bands. Head, thorax and abdomen dark brown. Sex-mark: the base of vein 4 swollen and bare of scales.

=== Female ===
"Above black, a round dull white discal area on the forewing from just above the upper median (vein 4) almost to the submedian vein (vein 1). Below irregularly speckled and variegated; forewing with the costal and apical parts ochreous brown, the rest blackish. Hindwing also tinged with ochreous, a submarginal dark area, and obscure dark transverse bands. Hindwing not angled, the margin entire." (Doherty quoted in Bingham)

== Range ==
Assam - Myanmar, Malaya, Borneo?, Thailand, Laos, Sumatra.

== Taxonomy ==
The butterfly is also referred to as Logania massalia Doherty, 1891.

== See also ==
- List of butterflies of India
- List of butterflies of India (Lycaenidae)
