= Megalopalpus metaleucus =

- Megalopalpus metaleucus in Seitz (f)

Scientific classification
- Kingdom: Animalia
- Phylum: Arthropoda
- Clade: Pancrustacea
- Class: Insecta
- Order: Lepidoptera
- Family: Lycaenidae
- Genus: Megalopalpus
- Species: M. metaleucus

Binomial name
- Megalopalpus metaleucus Karsch, 1893

Species of butterfly

Megalopalpus metaleucus, the large harvester, is a butterfly in the family Lycaenidae. It is found in Liberia, Ivory Coast, Ghana, Togo, Nigeria, Cameroon, the Republic of the Congo, the Central African Republic, the Democratic Republic of the Congo (Mayumbe, Mongala, Uele, Équateur and Sankuru) and Uganda. The habitat consists of forests.

Torben Larsen developed a species numbering system for his 2005 publication Butterflies of West Africa. This species is #129. The 'Larsen' numbers have since been used with permission in A Sharp Eye on Butterflies of Ghana.
