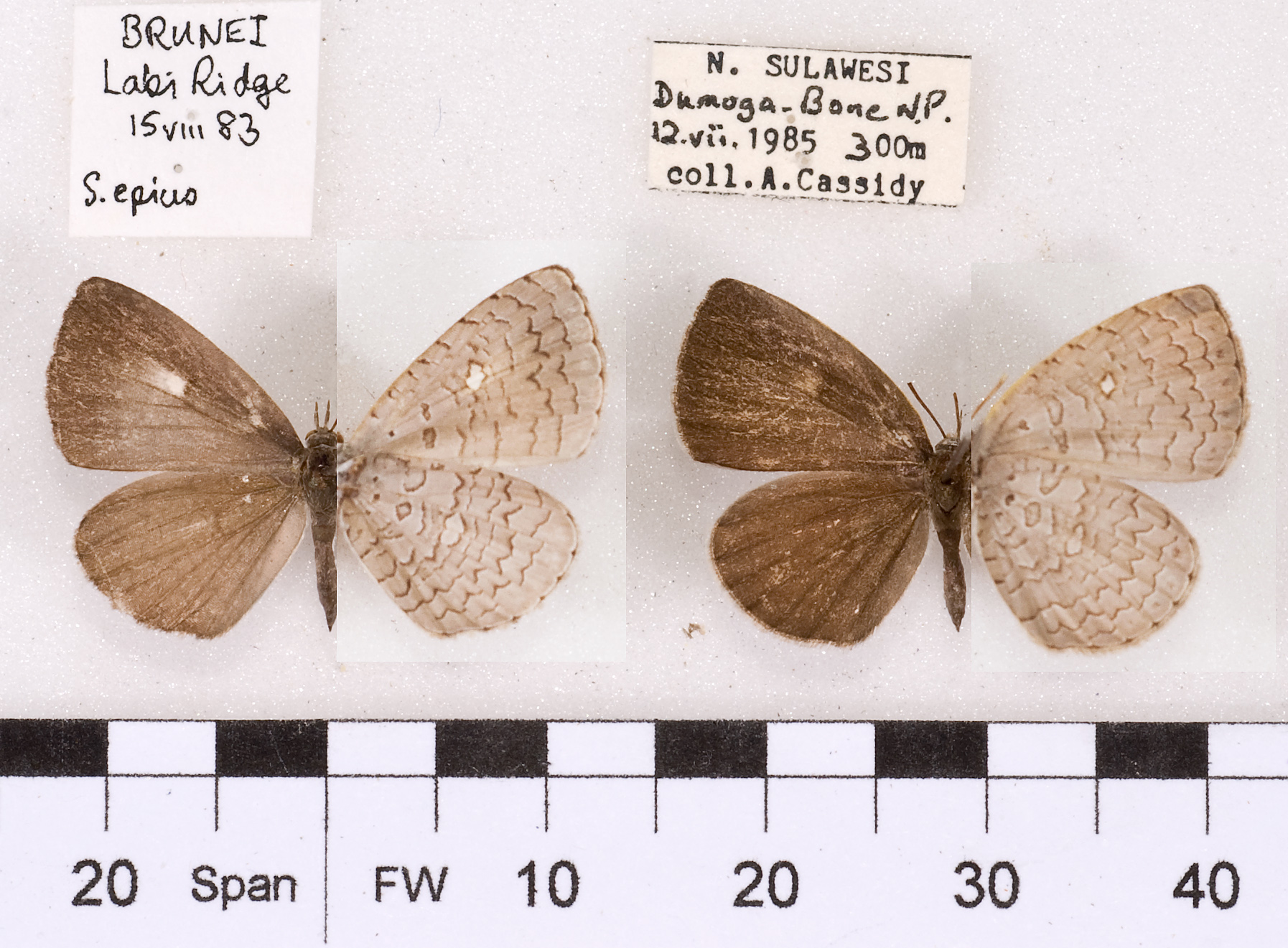
- Spagis epius

Scientific classification
- Domain: Eukaryota
- Kingdom: Animalia
- Phylum: Arthropoda
- Class: Insecta
- Order: Lepidoptera
- Family: Lycaenidae
- Subfamily: Miletinae
- Tribe: Spalgini
- Genus: Spalgis; Moore, 1879

= Spalgis =

Butterfly genus in family Lycaenidae

Spalgis is a genus of butterflies in the family Lycaenidae. Spalgis are found in the Australasian realm (New Guinea), the Indomalayan realm, and the Afrotropical realm. The genus was erected by Frederic Moore in 1879.

== Species ==
- Spalgis asmus Parsons, 1986
- Spalgis baiongus Cantlie & Norman, 1960
- Spalgis epius (Westwood, [1851])
- Spalgis jacksoni Stempffer, 1967
- Spalgis lemolea Druce, 1890
- Spalgis takanamii Eliot, 1984
- Spalgis tintinga (Boisduval, 1833)
