= Euliphyra mirifica =

- Row "c" last image (right)

Scientific classification
- Kingdom: Animalia
- Phylum: Arthropoda
- Clade: Pancrustacea
- Class: Insecta
- Order: Lepidoptera
- Family: Lycaenidae
- Genus: Euliphyra
- Species: E. mirifica

Binomial name
- Euliphyra mirifica Holland, 1890

Species of butterfly

Euliphyra mirifica, the African moth butterfly, is a butterfly in the family Lycaenidae. It is found in Ghana, Nigeria, Cameroon, Gabon, the Republic of the Congo, the Central African Republic, northern Angola and the western two-thirds of the Democratic Republic of the Congo. The habitat consists of forests.

Adults have been recorded in June and July.

The larvae live in the nests of Oecophylla smaragdina race longinoda and feed on ant regurgitations.
