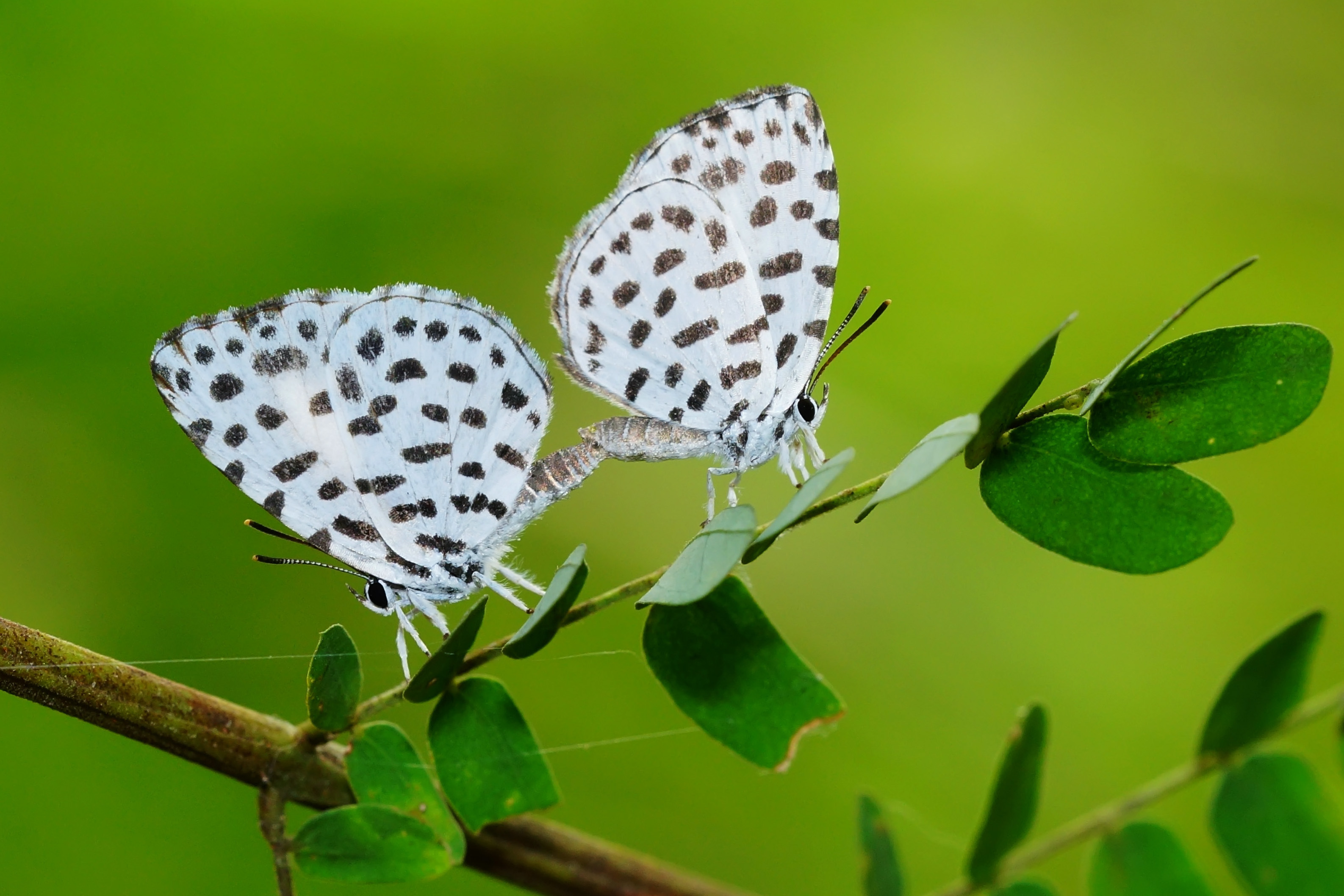
- Copulating pair of Taraka haimada.

Scientific classification
- Domain: Eukaryota
- Kingdom: Animalia
- Phylum: Arthropoda
- Class: Insecta
- Order: Lepidoptera
- Family: Lycaenidae
- Subfamily: Miletinae
- Tribe: Spalgini
- Genus: Taraka; Doherty, 1889

= Taraka (butterfly) =

Butterfly genus in family Lycaenidae

Taraka is a genus of butterflies in the family Lycaenidae that inhabit the East Asian Palearctic and Indomalayan realms. It includes the species Taraka hamada, Taraka mahanetra de Nicéville, (Peninsular Malaya, Sumatra, Thailand) and Taraka shiloi Tamai & Guo, 2001 Sichuan.
