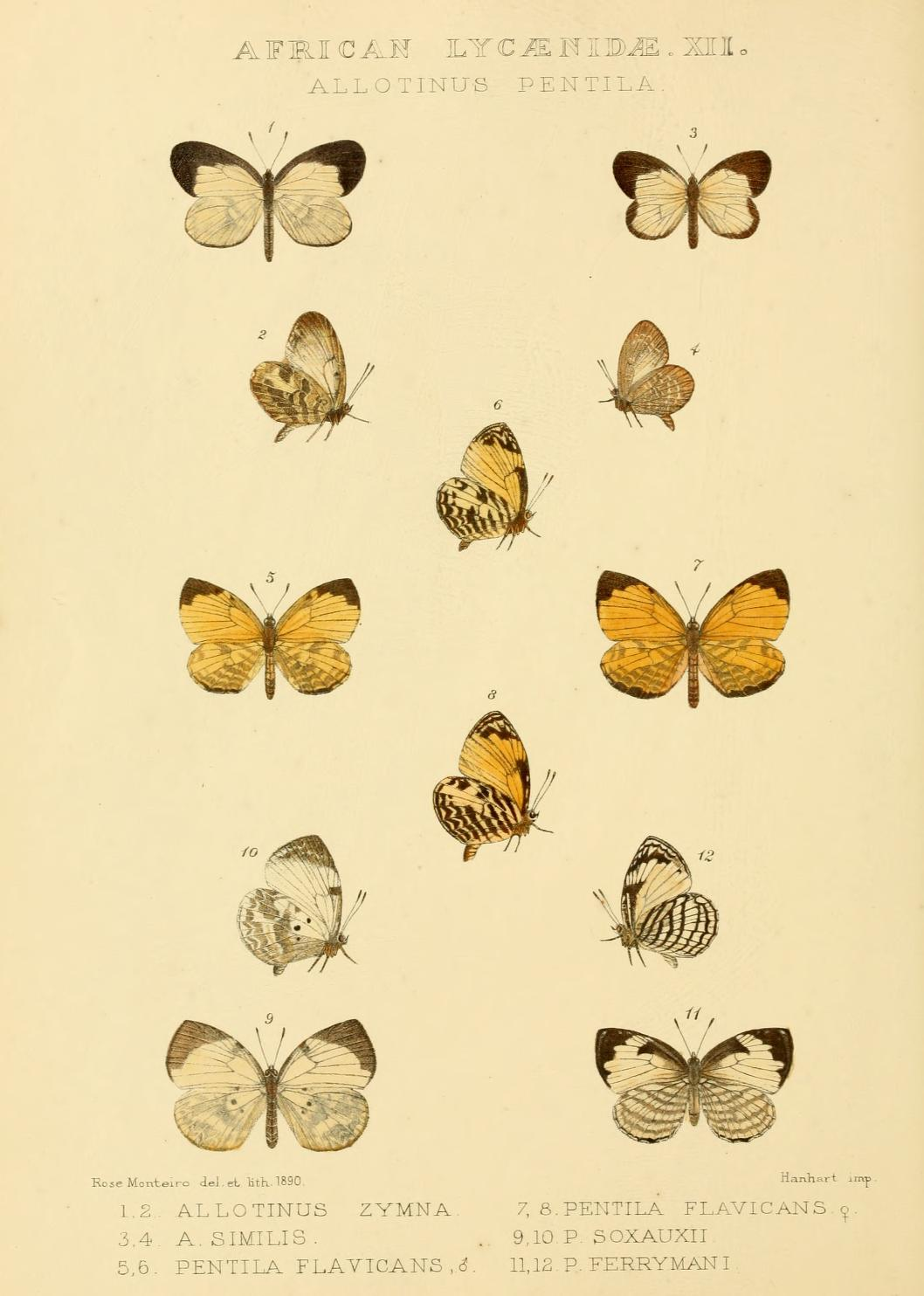

Scientific classification
- Kingdom: Animalia
- Phylum: Arthropoda
- Clade: Pancrustacea
- Class: Insecta
- Order: Lepidoptera
- Family: Lycaenidae
- Genus: Megalopalpus
- Species: M. zymna

Binomial name
- Megalopalpus zymna (Westwood, 1851)

Synonyms
- Pentila zymna Westwood, 1851; Megalopalpus zymna f. pallida Aurivillius, 1922

= Megalopalpus zymna =

Species of butterfly

Megalopalpus zymna, the common harvester, is a butterfly in the family Lycaenidae. It is found in Liberia, Côte d'Ivoire, Ghana, Togo, Nigeria, Cameroon, Equatorial Guinea (Mbini and Bioko), Gabon, the Republic of the Congo, the Central African Republic, Angola, the Democratic Republic of the Congo, southern Sudan, Uganda, north-western Tanzania and Zambia.The habitat is forest and dense agricultural land.

Torben Larsen developed a species numbering system for his 2005 publication Butterflies of West Africa. This species is #127. The 'Larsen' numbers have since been used with permission in A Sharp Eye on Butterflies of Ghana.
