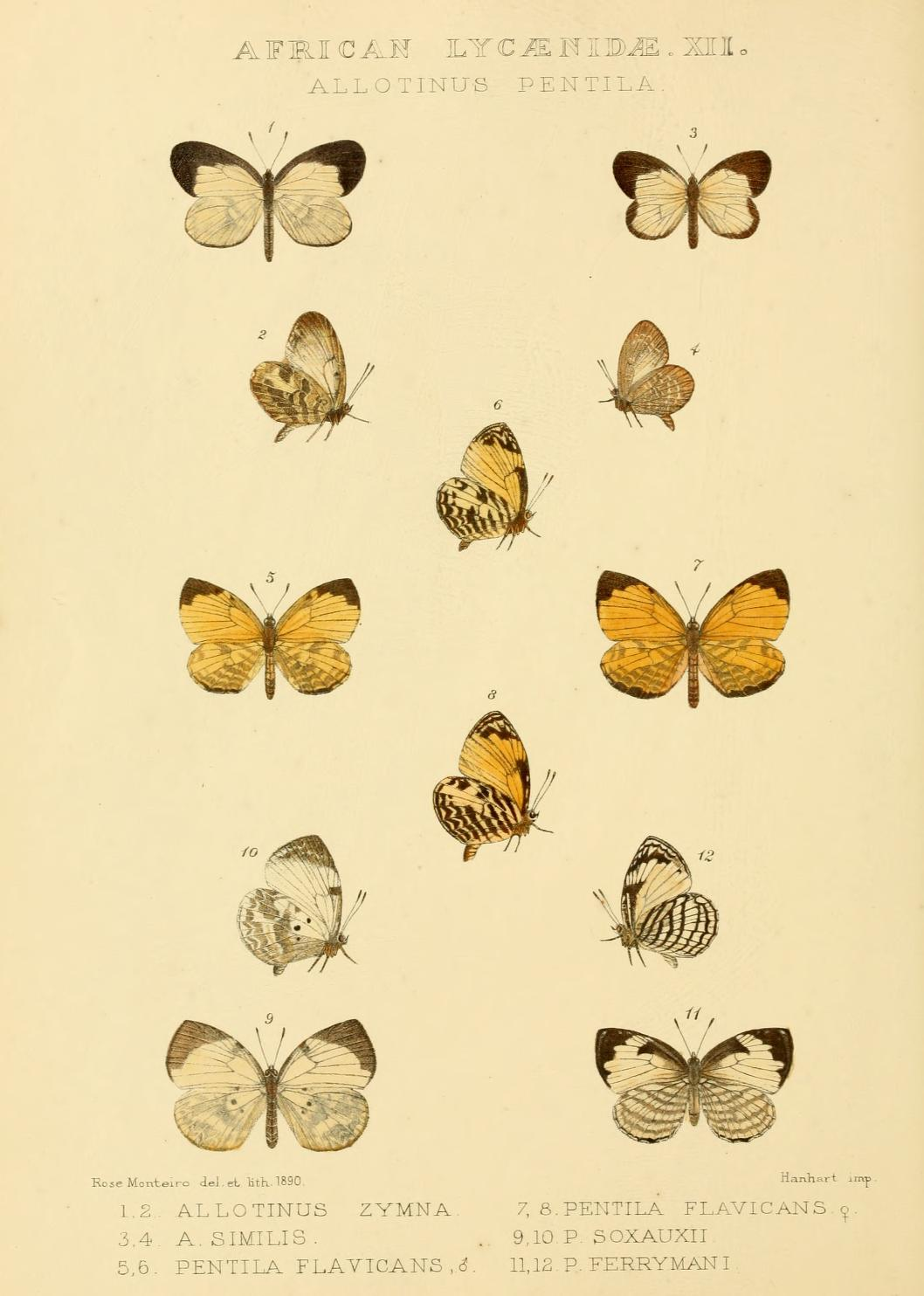
- Megalopalpus zymna figures 1, 2

Scientific classification
- Domain: Eukaryota
- Kingdom: Animalia
- Phylum: Arthropoda
- Class: Insecta
- Order: Lepidoptera
- Family: Lycaenidae
- Subfamily: Miletinae
- Tribe: Miletini
- Genus: Megalopalpus; Röber, 1886

= Megalopalpus =

Butterfly genus in family Lycaenidae

Megalopalpus is a genus of butterflies in the family Lycaenidae.

== Species ==
- Megalopalpus angulosus Grünberg, 1910
- Megalopalpus metaleucus Karsch, 1893
- Megalopalpus simplex Röber, 1886
- Megalopalpus zymna (Westwood, [1851])
