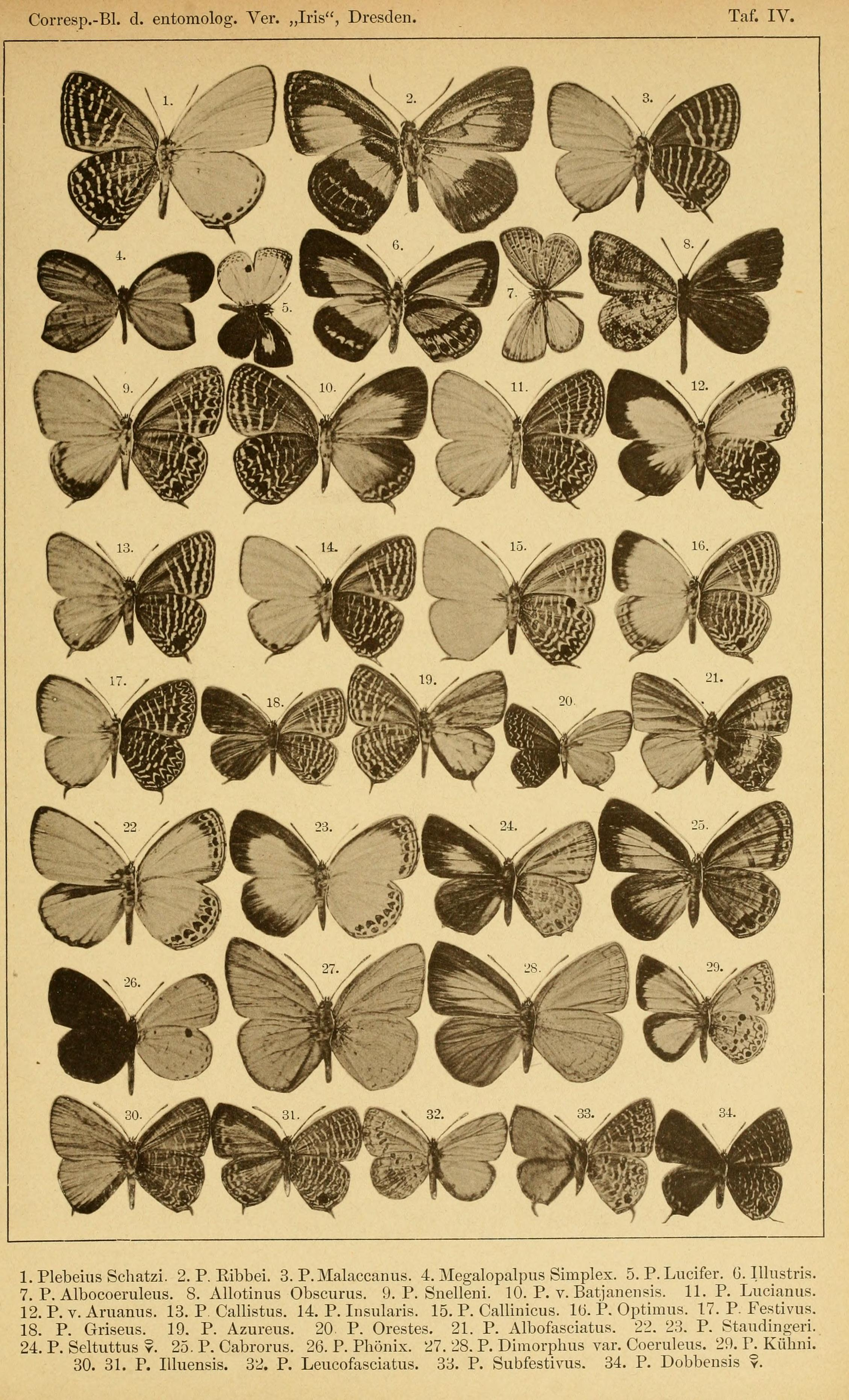
- Röber, 1886 Corr.-Bl. Ent. Ver. Iris 1 (3) Taf IV figure 4

Scientific classification
- Domain: Eukaryota
- Kingdom: Animalia
- Phylum: Arthropoda
- Class: Insecta
- Order: Lepidoptera
- Family: Lycaenidae
- Genus: Megalopalpus
- Species: M. simplex

Binomial name
- Megalopalpus simplex Röber, 1886

Synonyms
- Liptena bicoloria Capronnier, 1889; Allotinus similis Kirby, 1890; Megalopalpus gigas Bethune-Baker, 1914

= Megalopalpus simplex =

Species of butterfly

Megalopalpus simplex is a butterfly in the family Lycaenidae. It is found in Liberia, Ghana, Nigeria, Cameroon, Gabon, the Democratic Republic of the Congo and Uganda.
