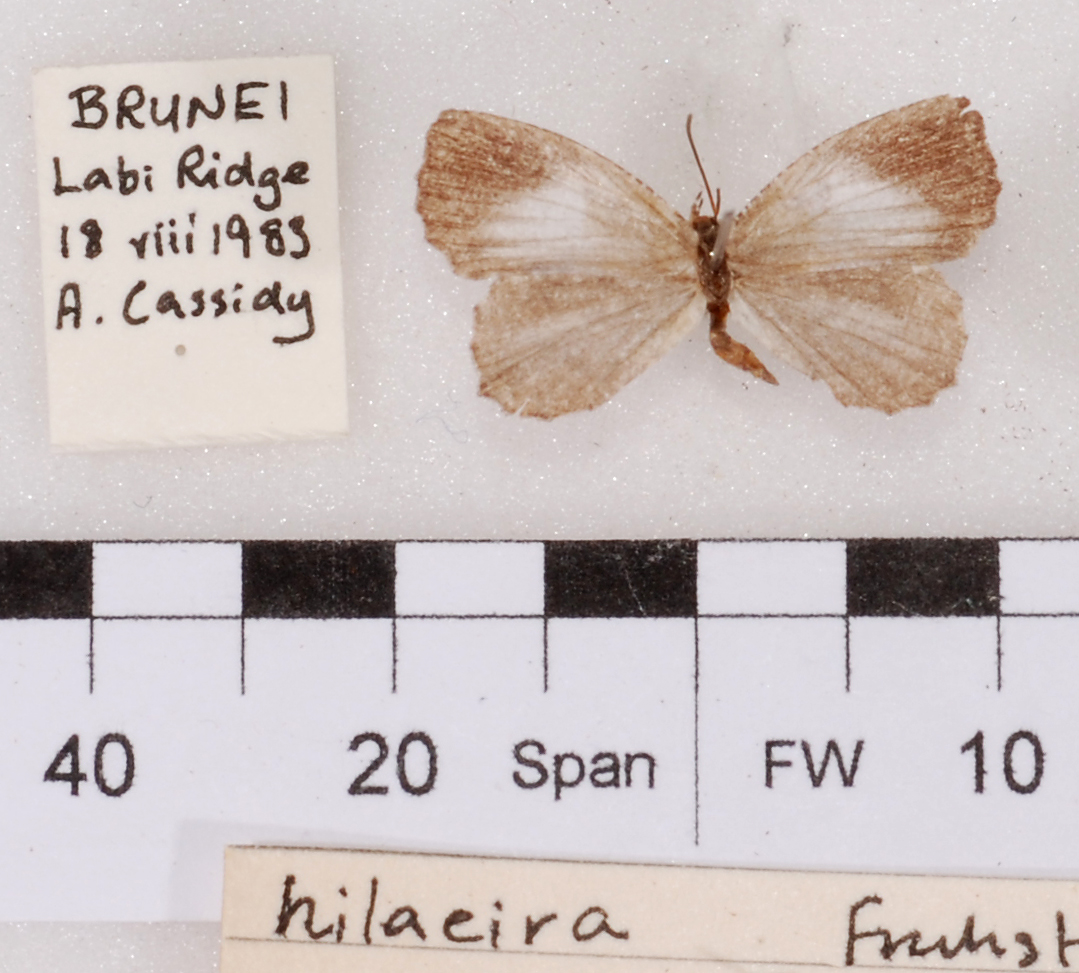

Scientific classification
- Kingdom: Animalia
- Phylum: Arthropoda
- Class: Insecta
- Order: Lepidoptera
- Family: Lycaenidae
- Genus: Logania
- Species: L. marmorata

Binomial name
- Logania marmorata Moore, 1884

Synonyms
- Logania massalia damis Fruhstorfer, 1914; Logania obscura Distant & Pryer, 1887 (preocc. Röber, 1886); Logania massalia nada Fruhstorfer, 1914; Logania marmorata stenosa Fruhstorfer, 1914; Logania marmorata cineraria Fruhstorfer, 1914; Logania massalia sora Fruhstorfer, 1914; Miletus lahomius Kheil, 1884; Logania massalia munichya Fruhstorfer, 1914; Logania marmorata javanica Fruhstorfer, 1914; Logania massalia glypha Fruhstorfer, 1914; Allotinus (Logania) distanti Staudinger, 1889 (preocc. Semper, 1889)

= Logania marmorata =

Species of butterfly

Logania marmorata, the pale mottle, is a butterfly in the family Lycaenidae. It was described by Frederic Moore in 1884. It is found in the Indomalayan realm.An insignificant, though widely distributed species. Its range extends from the Philippines in the north and from Tenasserim through the whole of Macromalayana.The whole basal part of the forewing is whitish, or bluish-grey, according to the habitat, the apical border being broad black. In the name-type and a race of North Borneo also the hindwing is brightened up by bluish-grey, the other insular marmorata. forms exhibit black hindwings. — marmorata Moore (141 f), the lightest off-branch of the total species. Forewing of the male almost white, with a delicate violet tint, while in the female lying before me [Fruhstorfer] from Singapore, it is dull chalk-coloured. Hindwing with a pale bluish-grey basal zone comprising yet the middle zone. Under surface grey with whitish diffuse spots, submarginal accumulations of blackish scales and indistinct brown maculae of the hindwings being preponderately speckled with a silvery grey

== Subspecies ==
- Logania marmorata marmorata (southern Burma, Thailand, Laos, Vietnam)
- Logania marmorata damis Fruhstorfer, 1914 (Thailand, Langkawi, Malay Peninsula, Singapore)
- Logania marmorata hilaeira Fruhstorfer, 1914 (Sumatra, Borneo)
- Logania marmorata lahomius (Kheil, 1884) (Nias)
- Logania marmorata diehli Eliot, 1986 (Simalur)
- Logania marmorata munichya Fruhstorfer, 1914 (western Java)
- Logania marmorata javanica Fruhstorfer, 1914 (eastern Java, Sumbawa, Flores)
- Logania marmorata palawana Fruhstorfer, 1914 (Palawan, Balabac, Luzon, Marinduque)
- Logania marmorata samosata Fruhstorfer, 1914 (Cebu, Mindoro)
- Logania marmorata faustina Fruhstorfer, 1914 (Mindanao, Leyte, Samar, Sulu, Tawi Tawi)
