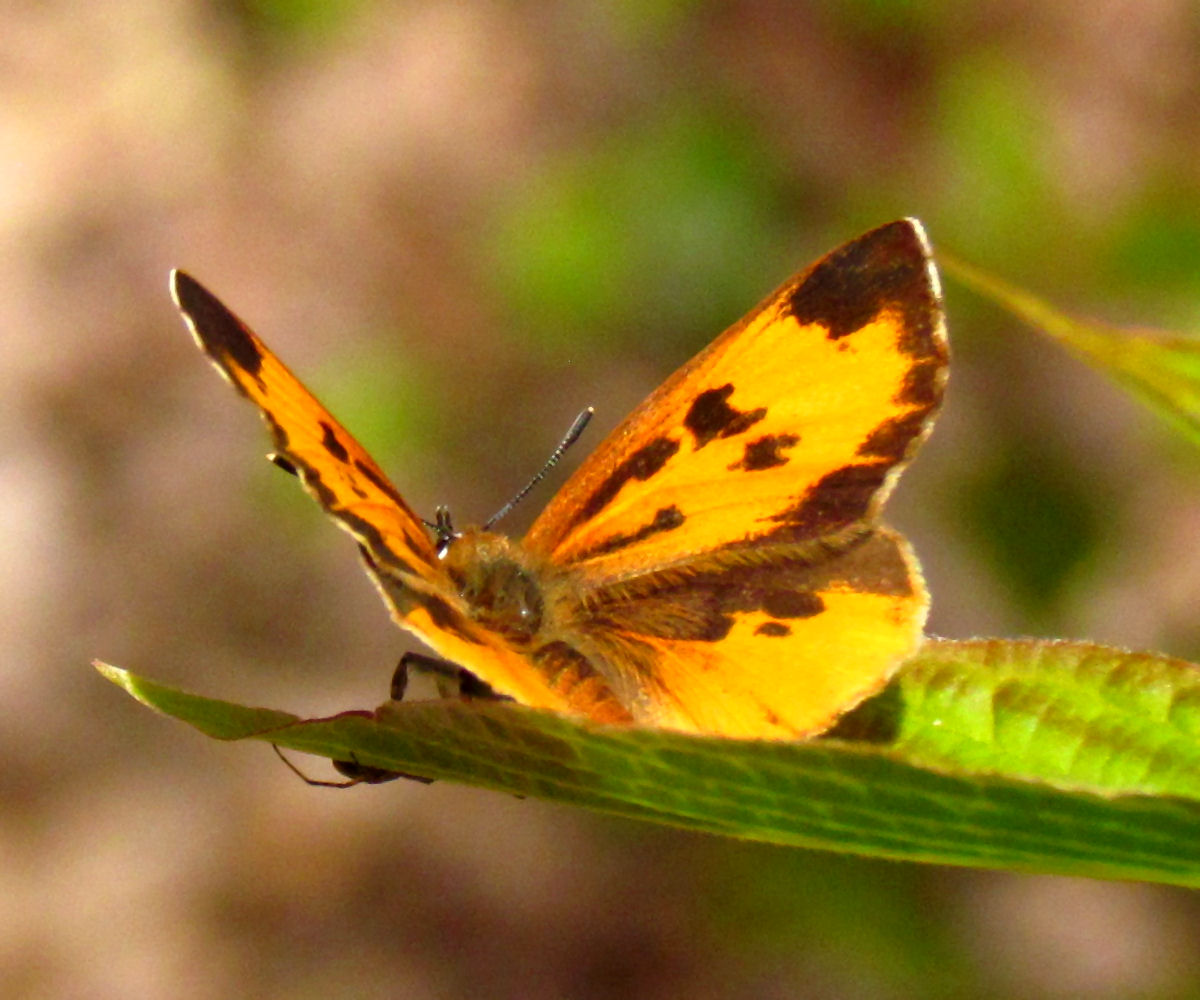

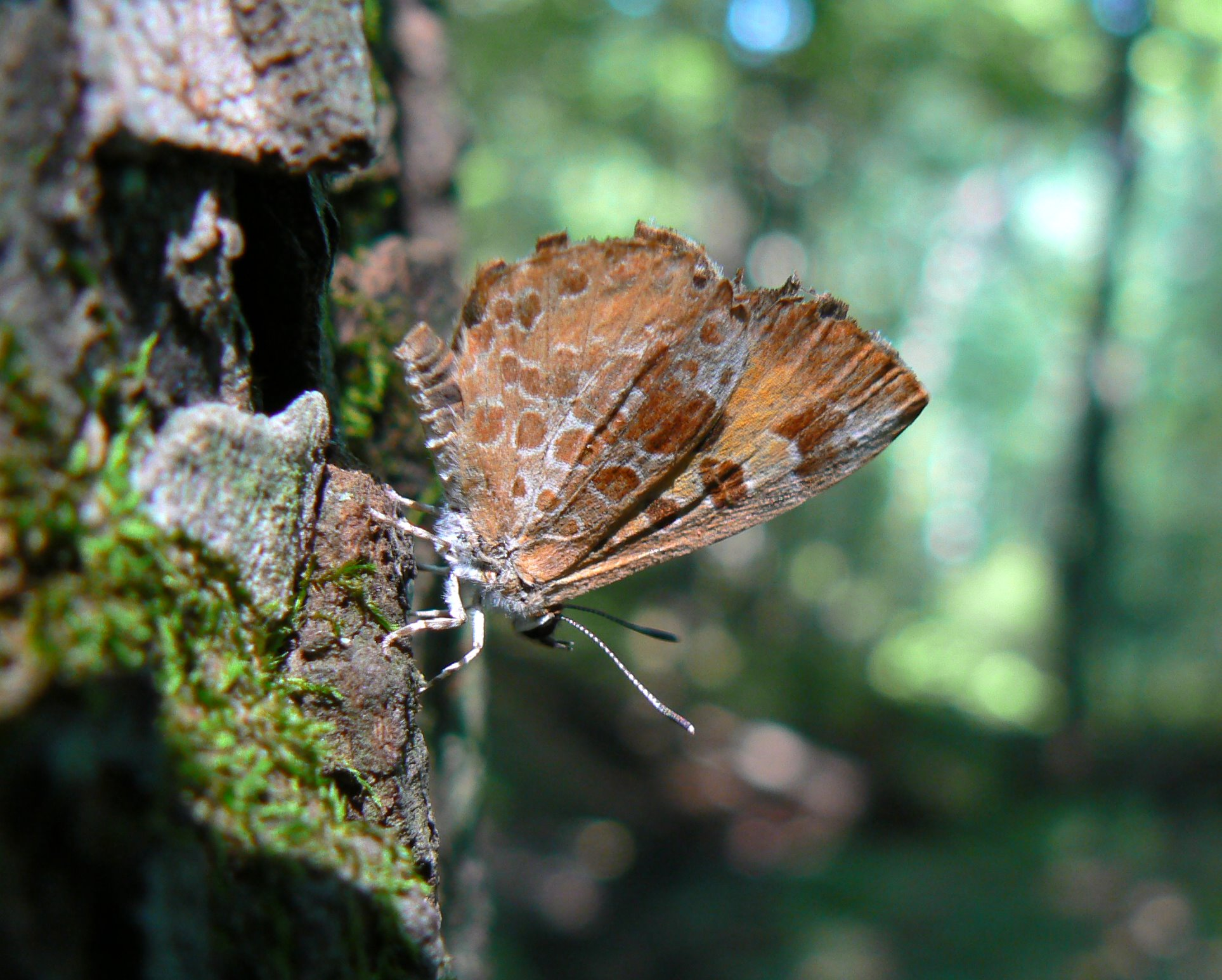
- Underside

Conservation status
- Secure (NatureServe)

Scientific classification
- Kingdom: Animalia
- Phylum: Arthropoda
- Class: Insecta
- Order: Lepidoptera
- Family: Lycaenidae
- Subfamily: Miletinae
- Tribe: Spalgini
- Genus: Feniseca; Grote, 1869
- Species: F. tarquinius

Binomial name
- Feniseca tarquinius (Fabricius, 1793)

Subspecies
- F. t. tarquinius; F. t. novascotiae McDunnough, 1935

Synonyms
- Hesperia tarquinius Fabricius, 1793

= Feniseca =

Harvester

Monotypic butterfly genus

Feniseca tarquinius, the harvester, is a butterfly of the family Lycaenidae, and the only member of the monotypic genus Feniseca. It is found in eastern North America.

As a member of the subfamily Miletinae, this butterfly is entirely carnivorous (specifically insectivorous), making it the only obligate carnivore butterfly in North America. The larvae feed on various aphids, such as Neoprociphilus, Pemphigus, Prociphilus, and Schizoneura.

It is found in early spring until fall and is generally scarce. It lives in wooded areas near streams close to alders.

The wingspan is 23–32 mm.
