= Liphyra grandis =

Scientific classification
- Domain: Eukaryota
- Kingdom: Animalia
- Phylum: Arthropoda
- Class: Insecta
- Order: Lepidoptera
- Family: Lycaenidae
- Genus: Liphyra
- Species: L. grandis

Binomial name
- Liphyra grandis Weymer 1902

Species of butterfly

Liphyra grandis is a butterfly found in Papua New Guinea.

This species has a body length of 28 mm with a diameter of 7 mm. The length of the forewings is 45 mm. The body is dark brown, underside of same is brownish grey. The antennae have a length of 16 mm. The main coloration of the forewings is dark brown with a large reddish-yellow transversal line.
