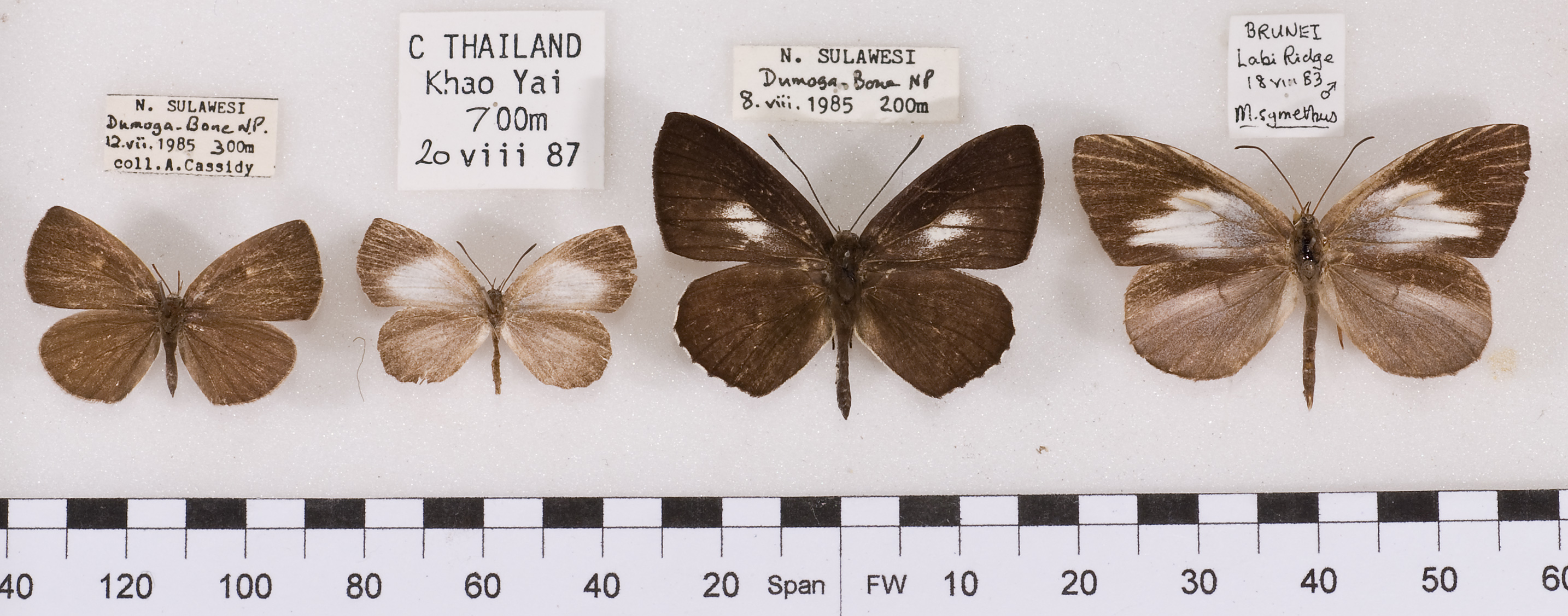
- Oriental Miletinae

Scientific classification
- Kingdom: Animalia
- Phylum: Arthropoda
- Class: Insecta
- Order: Lepidoptera
- Superfamily: Papilionoidea
- Family: Lycaenidae
- Subfamily: Miletinae; Corbet, 1939

Genera
- Allotinus; Aslauga; Euliphyra; Feniseca; Lachnocnema; Liphyra; Logania; Lontalius; Megalopalpus; Miletus; Spalgis; Taraka; Thestor; Tennenta

= Miletinae =

Harvesters

Subfamily of butterflies

Miletinae is a subfamily of the family Lycaenidae of butterflies, commonly called harvesters and woolly legs, and virtually unique among butterflies in having predatory larvae. Miletinae are entirely aphytophagous (do not feed on plants). The ecology of the Miletinae is little understood, but adults and larvae live in association with ants, and most known species feed on Hemiptera (aphids, coccids, membracids, and psyllids), though some, like Liphyra, feed on the ants themselves. The butterflies, ants, and hemipterans, in some cases, seem to have complex symbiotic relationships benefiting all.

== Systematics ==
- Tribe Miletini
  - Allotinus C. & R. Felder, [1865] — Indomalayan realm
  - Lontalius Eliot, 1986 — Indomalayan realm
  - Miletus Hübner, [1819] — Indomalayan realm
  - Logania Distant, 1884 — Indomalayan realm
  - Megalopalpus Röber, [1886] — Afrotropical realm
- Tribe Spalgini
  - Spalgis Moore, 1879 — Indomalayan realm, Afrotropical realm
  - Feniseca Grote, 1869 — Nearctic realm (one species, Feniseca tarquinius)
  - Taraka Doherty, 1889 — East Asian Palearctic realm, Indomalayan realm (sometimes in a separate tribe: Tarakini)
  - Tennenta Müller, 2017 — Australasian realm
- Tribe Lachnocnemini
  - Lachnocnema Trimen, 1887 — Afrotropical realm
  - Thestor Hübner, [1819] — Afrotropical realm
- Tribe Liphyrini (formerly a separate subfamily: Liphyrinae)
  - Euliphyra Holland, 1890 — Afrotropical realm
  - Aslauga Kirby, 1890 — Afrotropical realm
  - Liphyra Westwood, [1864] — Indomalayan realm, Australasian realm
