= Liocypris =

Conservation status
- Extinct (IUCN 2.3)

Scientific classification
- Kingdom: Animalia
- Phylum: Arthropoda
- Class: Ostracoda
- Order: Podocopida
- Family: Cyprididae
- Genus: Liocypris
- Species: †L. grandis

Binomial name
- †Liocypris grandis G. O. Sars, 1924

Extinct genus of seed shrimps

Liocypris grandis was an extinct species of ostracod. It was not been seen since its original description by Georg Ossian Sars in 1924. It is assessed by extinct for the IUCN Red List in 1996.
