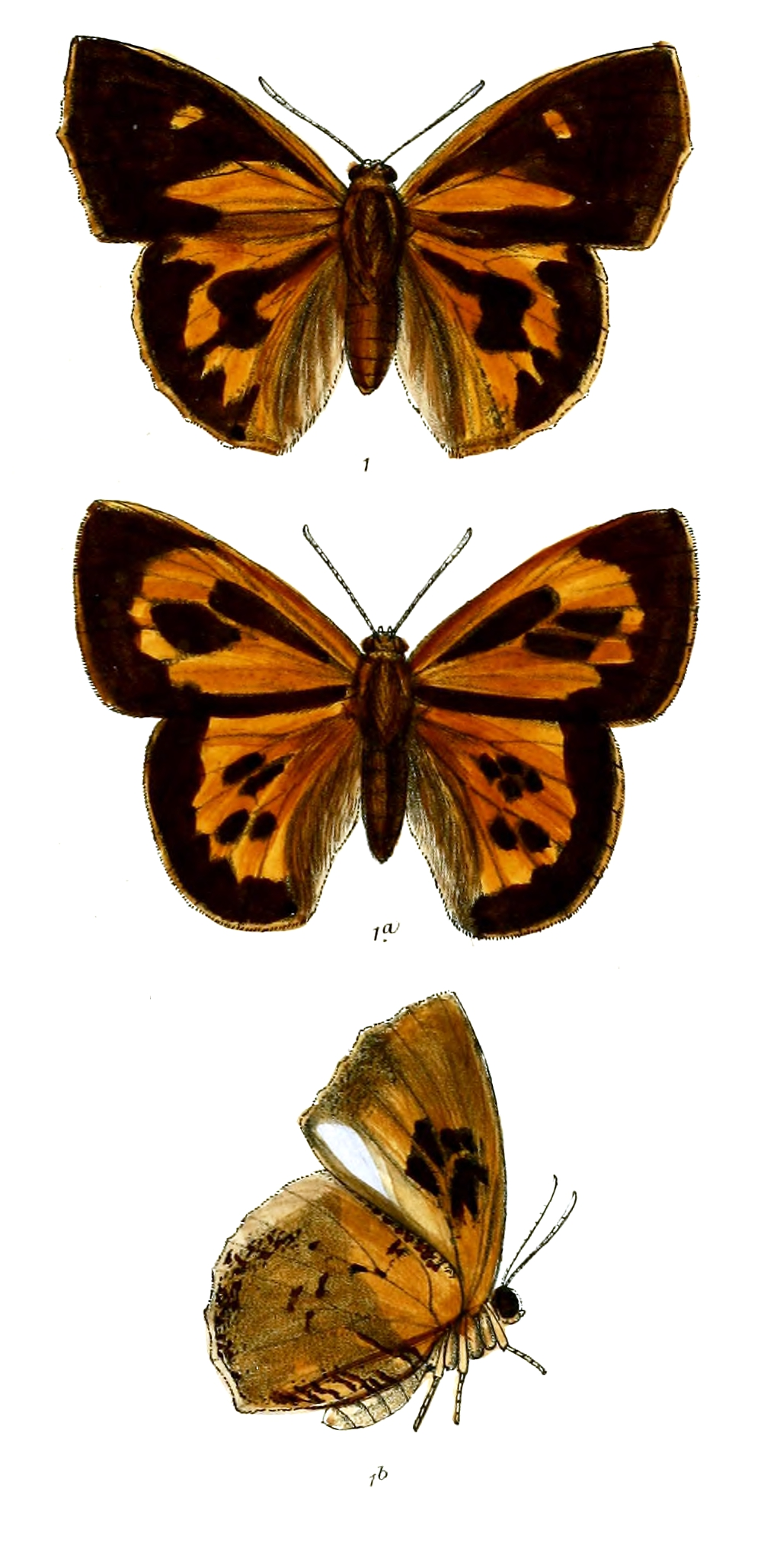
- Liphyra brassolis

Scientific classification
- Domain: Eukaryota
- Kingdom: Animalia
- Phylum: Arthropoda
- Class: Insecta
- Order: Lepidoptera
- Family: Lycaenidae
- Subfamily: Miletinae
- Tribe: Liphyrini
- Genus: Liphyra; Westwood, 1864

Synonyms
- Sterosis C. & R. Felder, 1865

= Liphyra =

Butterfly genus in family Lycaenidae

Liphyra is a butterfly genus in the family Lycaenidae. It was first described by John O. Westwood in 1864. The larvae are predatory and feed on ant larvae. They are among the largest species of lycaenid butterflies. There are several species in the genus which are found in Asia and Australia. In the genus Liphyra, the antenna tapers gradually.

== Species ==
- Liphyra brassolis Westwood 1864 - moth butterfly
- Liphyra castnia Strand, 1911
- Liphyra grandis Weymer, 1902
