= Prosotas dilata =

Scientific classification
- Domain: Eukaryota
- Kingdom: Animalia
- Phylum: Arthropoda
- Class: Insecta
- Order: Lepidoptera
- Family: Lycaenidae
- Genus: Prosotas
- Species: P. dilata

Binomial name
- Prosotas dilata (Evans, 1932)

Species of butterfly

Prosotas dilata is a species of lineblue (genus Prosotas) belonging to the blue butterfly family (Lycaenidae). The butterfly is found on the Nicobar Islands of India. It is now considered as a subspecies of the common lineblue (Prosotas nora).

== See also ==
- List of butterflies of India (Lycaenidae)
