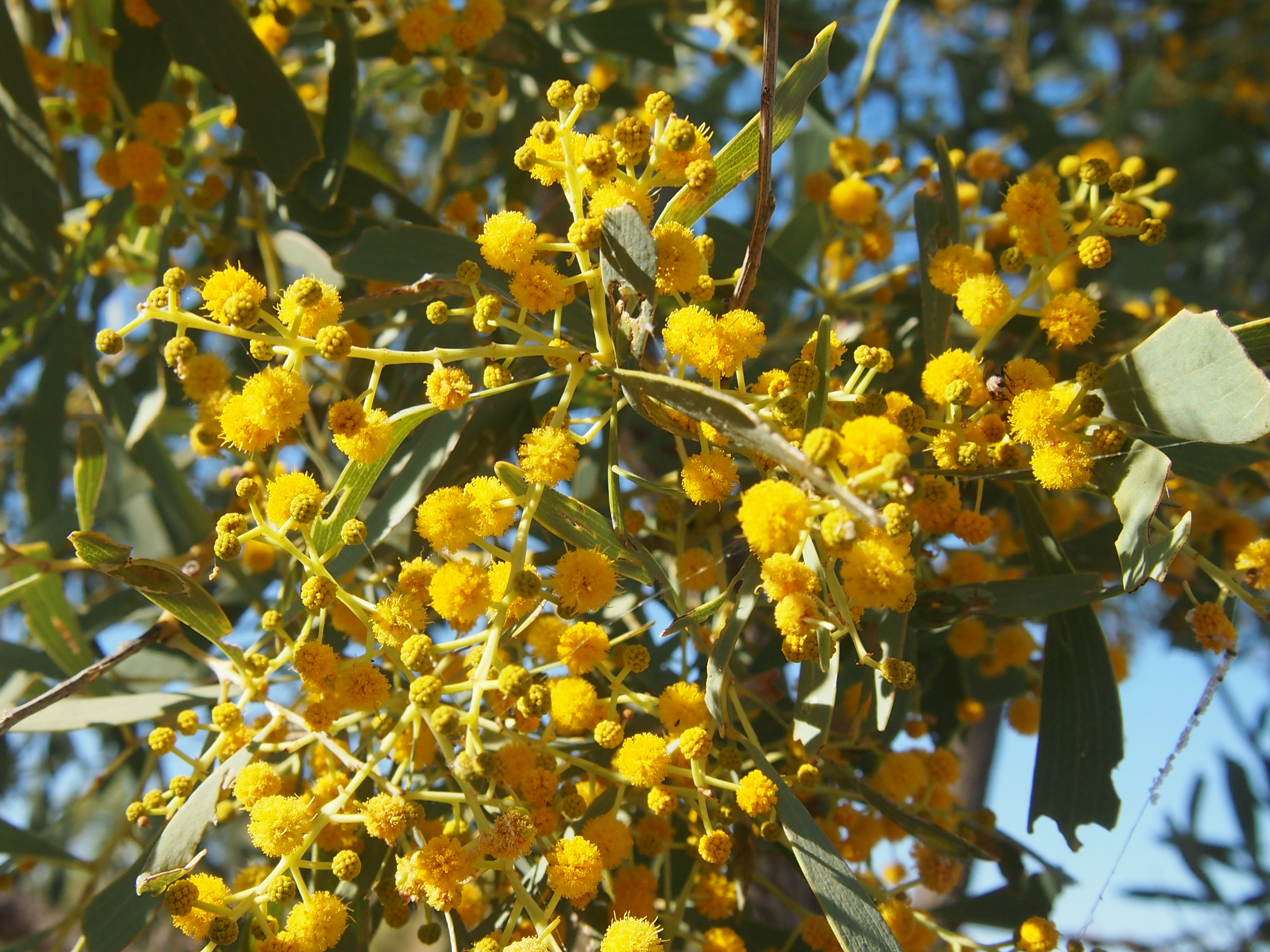

Scientific classification
- Kingdom: Plantae
- Clade: Embryophytes
- Clade: Tracheophytes
- Clade: Spermatophytes
- Clade: Angiosperms
- Clade: Eudicots
- Clade: Rosids
- Order: Fabales
- Family: Fabaceae
- Subfamily: Caesalpinioideae
- Clade: Mimosoid clade
- Genus: Acacia
- Species: A. hemignosta

Binomial name
- Acacia hemignosta F.Muell.
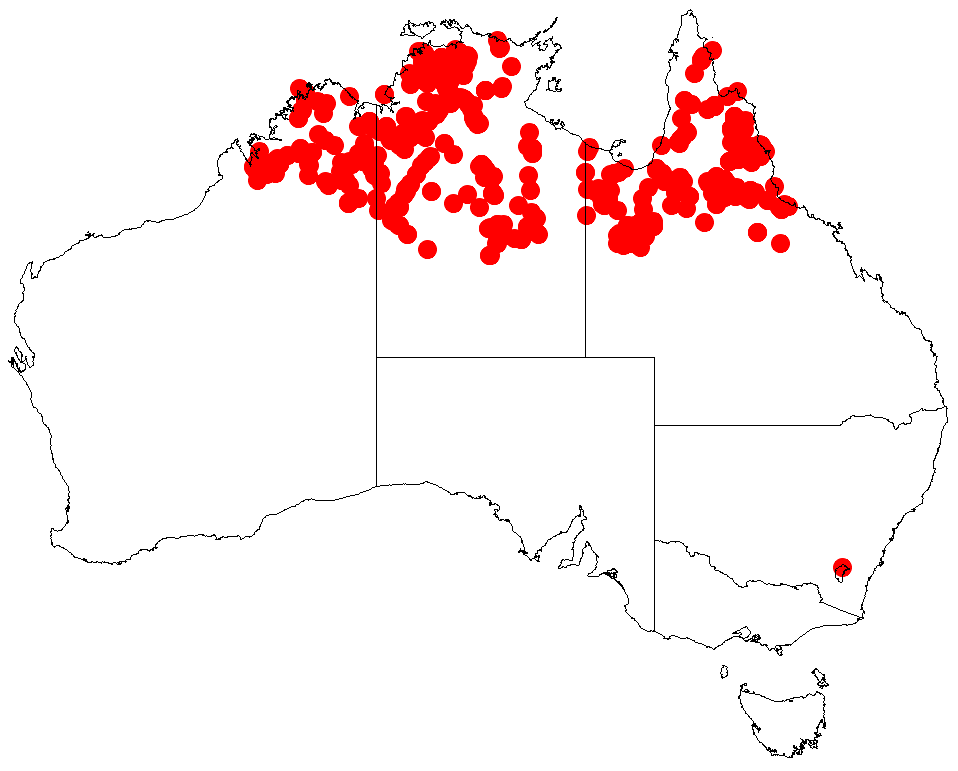
- Occurrence data from AVH

Synonyms
- Acacia cloncurrensis Domin; Racosperma hemignostum (F.Muell.) Pedley

= Acacia hemignosta =

Clubleaf wattle

Species of legume

Acacia hemignosta commonly known as clubleaf wattle, is a species of flowering plant in the family Fabaceae and is endemic to northern Australia. It is a tree, sometimes a shrub, usually with rough and more or less corky bark. Its phyllodes are lance-shaped to narrowly lance-shaped with the narrower end towards the base, straight to slightly curved, its flowers are borne in spherical heads of bright golden yellow flowers and its pods are narrowly oblong, flat, papery and glabrous.

== Description ==
Acacia hemignosta is usually a tree, sometimes a shrub, that typically grows to a height of 3–10 m (9.8–32.8 ft) and usually has rough and more or less corky bark. Its branchlets are sometimes pendulous, brittle and glabrous, sometimes covered with a powdery bloom. The phyllodes are lance-shaped to narrowly lance-shaped with the narrower end towards the base, occasionally more or less linear, straight to slightly curved, 60–150 mm (2.4–5.9 in) long and usually 10–30 mm (0.39–1.18 in) wide. The phyllodes are green, yellowish green, grey-green or glaucous, with three main veins. The flowers are borne in spherical heads in racemes, sometimes in panicles, on peduncles 4–12 mm (0.16–0.47 in) long, each head with 30 to 50 bright golden yellow flowers. Flowering occurs from May to October, and the pods are papery, glabrous, narrowly oblong, flat and straight, up to 80 mm (3.1 in) long, 8–12 mm (0.31–0.47 in) wide and raised over the seeds. The seeds are oblong to more or less round, 5.5–6.5 mm (0.22–0.26 in) long and brown, and lack an aril.

== Taxonomy ==
Acacia hemignosta was first formally described in 1859 by the botanist Ferdinand von Mueller in the Journal of the Proceedings of the Linnean Society, Botany. The specific epithet (hemignosta) means 'half known', because von Mueller was uncertain of its relationship to Acacia melanoxylon.

== Distribution and habitat ==
Clubleaf wattle has scattered occurrences in northern Australia north of 22°S, and is found in the Kimberley region of Western Australia, the north of the Northern Territory and the Cape York Peninsula area of Queensland. It grows in sandy and lateritic soils in flat or undulating country and in heavier soils close to creeks, mostly in open woodland.

== Ecology ==
This species of wattle in a host plant for the small purple lineblue butterfly, Prosotas dubiosa.

== Conservation status ==
Acacia hemignosta is listed as "not threatened" by the Government of Western Australia Department of Biodiversity, Conservation and Attractions, as of "least concern" under the northern Territory Government Territory Parks and Wildlife Conservation Act and the Queensland Government Nature Conservation Act 1992.

== See also ==
- List of Acacia species
