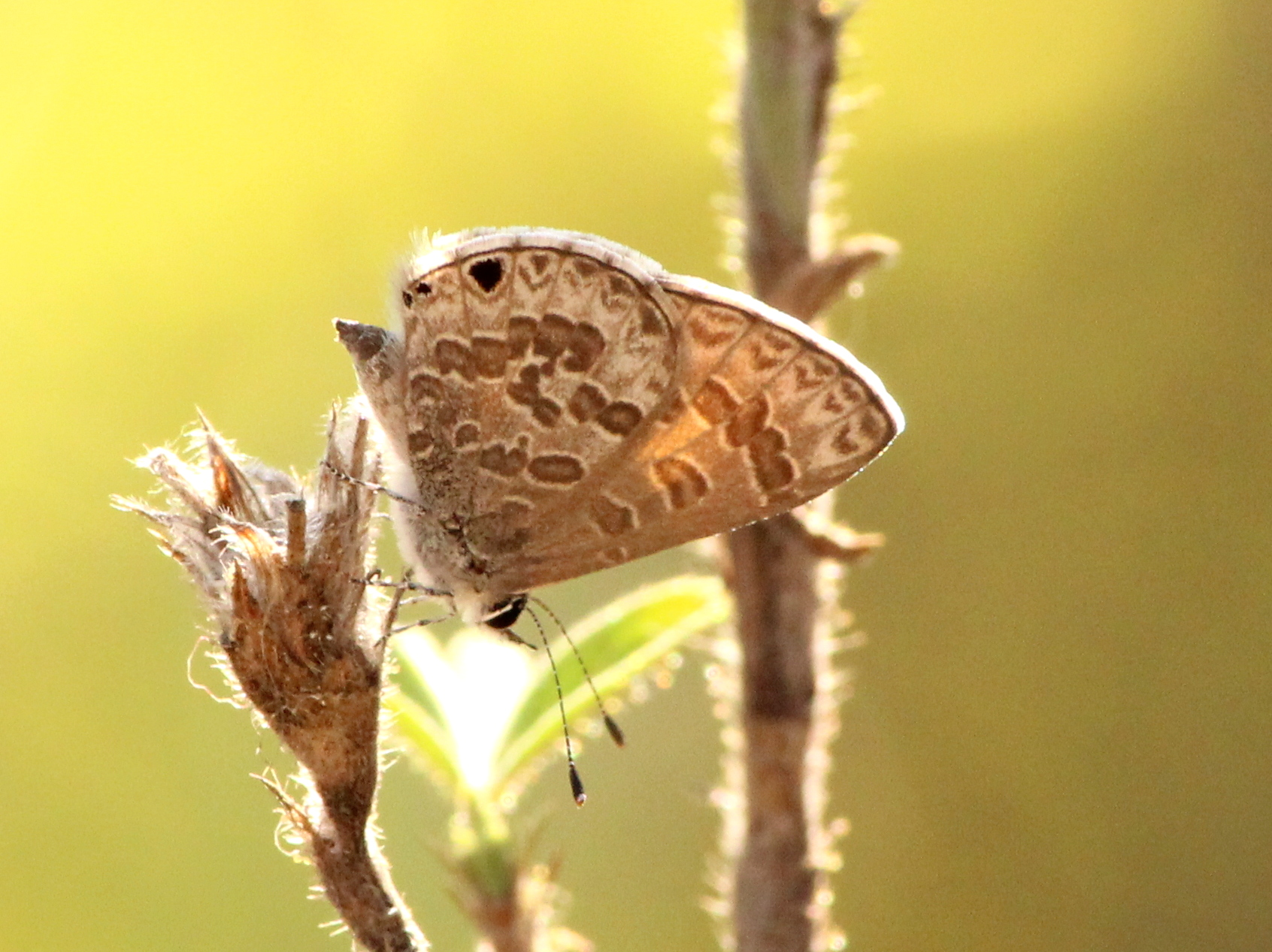

Scientific classification
- Domain: Eukaryota
- Kingdom: Animalia
- Phylum: Arthropoda
- Class: Insecta
- Order: Lepidoptera
- Family: Lycaenidae
- Genus: Prosotas
- Species: P. noreia

Binomial name
- Prosotas noreia (Felder, 1868)

= Prosotas noreia =

White-tipped lineblue

Species of butterfly

Prosotas noreia, the white-tipped lineblue, is a species of lycaenid butterfly found in South Asia and Java.

== Description ==
=== Race hampsoni ===
Male upperside pale brown flushed with shining purple. Forewings and hindwings: the purple gloss not extended to the dorsum of the hindwing nor to the costal and terminal margins of either wing, all of which are narrowly edged with the pale brown of the ground colour, beyond which along the termen of both wings are slender anteciliary lines. Cilia pale, their bases brown. Underside: dull brown. Forewing: two short slightly crenulate (scalloped) lines transversely across the middle of cell and two similar lines along the discocellulars, followed by a transverse, irregular, catenulated (chain-like), discal band slightly darker than the ground colour and margined inwardly and outwardly by slender white lines; terminal markings: a subterminal line of spots similarly slightly darker than the ground colour and margined with white lines; basal posterior half of wing below cell immaculate; finally, an anteciliary dark brown line. Hindwing: the following transverse, somewhat crenulate, slender white lines, between each pair of which the ground colour is slightly darker: an oblique pair at base, a pair along the discocellulars and a very irregular sinuous discal pair, the last dislocated at vein 6, the posterior portion curved and shifted outwards; these are followed by a subterminal inner and outer series of arrow-shaped lunules and an anteciliary dark line, this last with a very slender inner whitish edging; finally, a minute block spot near the termen in interspace 1a; another similar spot in interspace 1 and a very much larger round black spot in interspace 2; all these spots touched with white on the inner side. Antenna black, the shafts speckled with white; head, thorax and abdomen brown slightly purplish on the thorax and abdomen; beneath: palpi, thorax and abdomen dusky brownish white.

=== Sri Lankan race ===
"A geographical form of Prosotas nora, Felder, but with the external margin less convex in the fore wing. Upperside: both wings brownish fuscous. Fore wing with the interno-basal patch subtriangular. Hind wing with the basal patch violaceous, blue, the marginal spots more obscure, the usual extra-caudal one excepted, very obsolete. Underside: both wings hoary fuscescent; a discocellular spot (in the hind wing rather narrow), a chain-shaped fascia beyond the middle once broken with an antico-basal fasciole, on the fore wing not going beyond the median nervure, and a basal fascia on the hind wing composed of four spots and within it an anterior incomplete spot fuscous, circled with whitish filled up with the ground-colour, with somewhat fuscous marginal spots (in the hind wing more triangular), the extra-caudal one larger and the minute black anal pair on the hind wing excepted, circled with whitish, set upon concolorous spots, lunate in the fore wing and sagittate in the hind wing, with a fuscous marginal line and a whitish line before the cilia cut through by fuscous spots at the tips of the veins." (Felder quoted in Bingham.)
