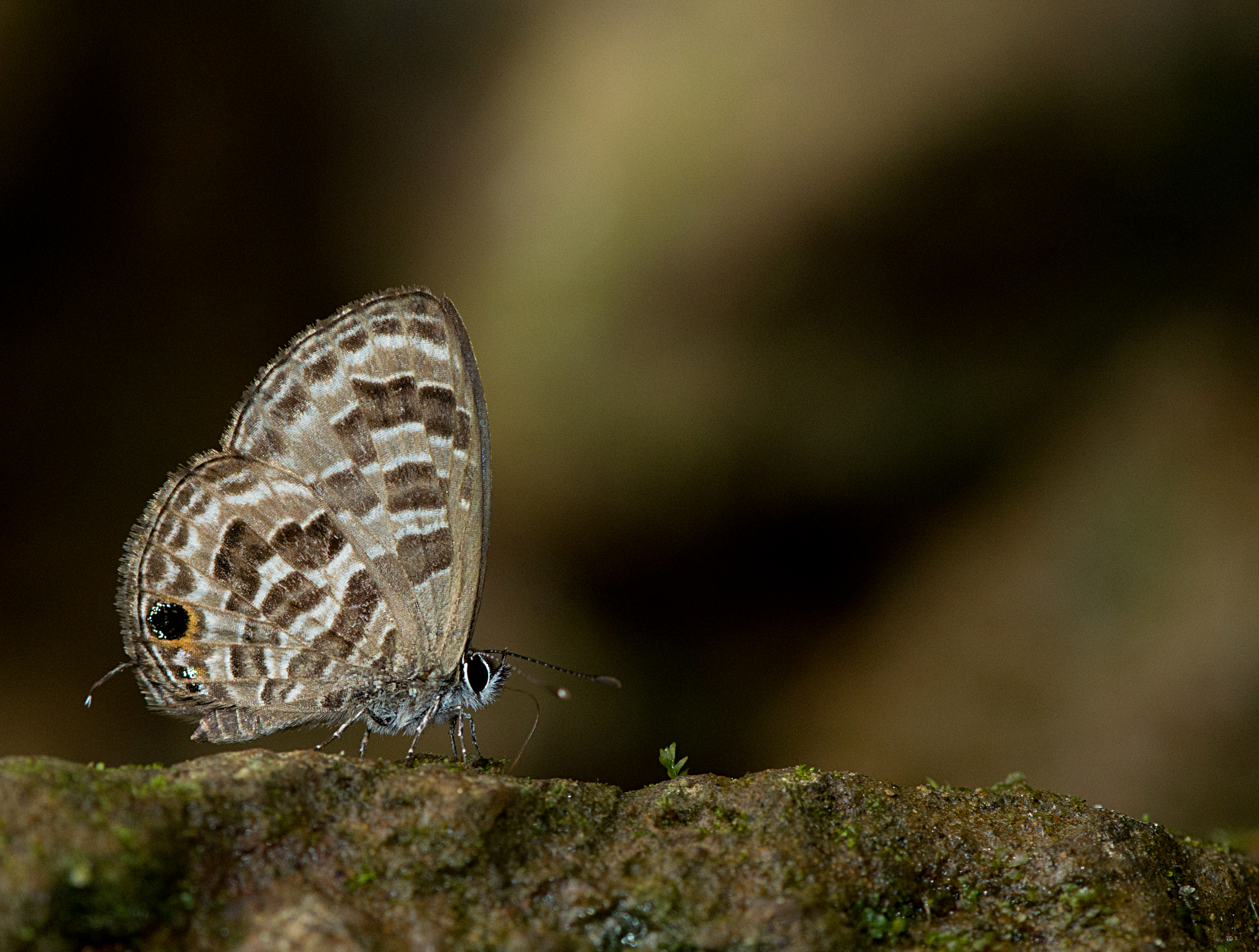
- At Garo Hills, Meghalaya, India

Scientific classification
- Domain: Eukaryota
- Kingdom: Animalia
- Phylum: Arthropoda
- Class: Insecta
- Order: Lepidoptera
- Family: Lycaenidae
- Genus: Prosotas
- Species: P. aluta

Binomial name
- Prosotas aluta (H. Druce, 1873)

= Prosotas aluta =

Banded lineblue

Species of butterfly

Prosotas aluta, the banded lineblue, is a species of blue butterfly (Lycaenidae) found in Asia. The species was first described by Herbert Druce in 1873.

== Description ==
Race coelestis: Male upperside: shining bluish with a purple flush in certain lights. Forewings and hindwings: termen narrowly edged with fuscous black on which the jet-black anteciliary line on each wing is obscurely visible, the edging of fuscous black slightly widened anteriorly. Underside: dusky brown. Forewing: a transverse, subbasal, broad, dark, brownish-black, white-margined band from the subcostal to vein 1, a similar band along the discocellulars also extended to vein 1, an upper discal similar band from costa, curved a little outwards and stopping short at vein 3, followed by a postdiscal transverse series of dark spots which on the inner side are comparatively broadly, on the outer side very slenderly edged with white; succeeding which is a subterminal extremely slender series of transversely linear spots, a white line and a jet-black anteciliary line; cilia brown. Hindwing: three transversely arranged dark brownish-black spots; transverse similarly coloured subbasal and discal bands, both bands inwardly and outwardly edged with slender white lines and the discal band greatly and irregularly widened in the middle, where superposed on the dark background is a snow-white transverse spot; beyond these are a postdiscal series of comparatively broad white lunules, a subterminal very slender white lunular line, a terminal white thread and a jet-black slender anteciliary line; cilia shining silky brown; tail brown tipped with white. Antennae black, the shafts obscurely speckled with white; head black; thorax and abdomen bluish; beneath: palpi with blackish fringe, thorax and abdomen whitish.

== Range ==
The butterfly occurs in India from Kumaon to Assam and onto Myanmar. It is also found in the Andamans. In Southeast Asia the butterfly ranges from Myanmar to southern Yunnan and southwards to Peninsular Malaysia, Borneo, Sumatra, Nias, northern Sulawesi, the Philippines, Thailand, Singapore, Vietnam, China, Nepal, Bhutan and Bangladesh.

== See also ==
- List of butterflies of India (Lycaenidae)
