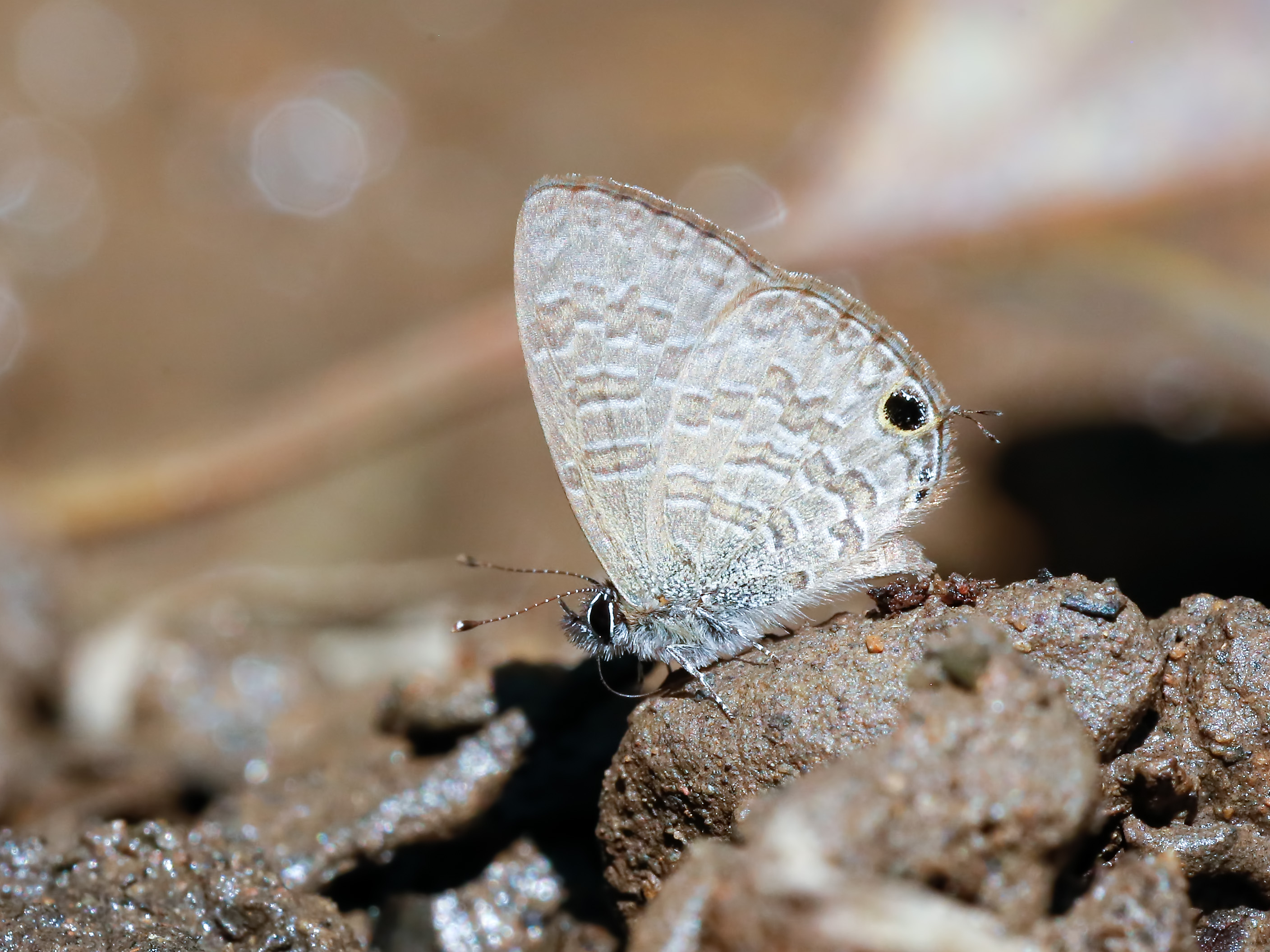

Scientific classification
- Domain: Eukaryota
- Kingdom: Animalia
- Phylum: Arthropoda
- Class: Insecta
- Order: Lepidoptera
- Family: Lycaenidae
- Genus: Prosotas
- Species: P. bhutea

Binomial name
- Prosotas bhutea (de Nicéville, 1884)

Synonyms
- Nacaduba bhutea

= Prosotas bhutea =

Bhutya lineblue

Species of butterfly

Prosotas bhutea, the Bhutya lineblue, is a species of blue butterfly (Lycaenidae) found in Asia.

== Range ==
The butterfly is found in India from Sikkim to Assam, and extends to Karens and onto Yunnan.

== Description ==
The male upperside is a dull opaque purplish brown. The forewings and hindwings are slender, dark anteciliary lines, but are otherwise uniform. The underside is a ground colour similar, but very much paler. The forewing is a transverse pale-edged fascia of a shade darker than the ground colour, as follows: one across middle of cell from costa to median vein, another from costa over the discocellulars to lower apex of cell, a discal curved fascia from costa to vein three, a spot below it shifted inwards; a transverse subterminal series of broad lunules of the same shade followed by a line of spots and an anteciliary slender line. The hindwing has a subbasal band, a short band along the discocellulars and a highly irregular, somewhat contorted, discal band, all similar in colour to those on the forewing. There are terminal markings as are on the forewing, but the lunules of the subterminal series are inwardly somewhat hastate (spear shaped), the row of spots beyond them each inwardly conical; a prominent black subterminal spot in interspace two, is inwardly ochraceous, and outwardly speckled with metallic blue scales. Antennae, head, thorax and abdomen are a dull, purplish brown. The thorax is somewhat grizzled.

== See also ==
- List of butterflies of India (Lycaenidae)
