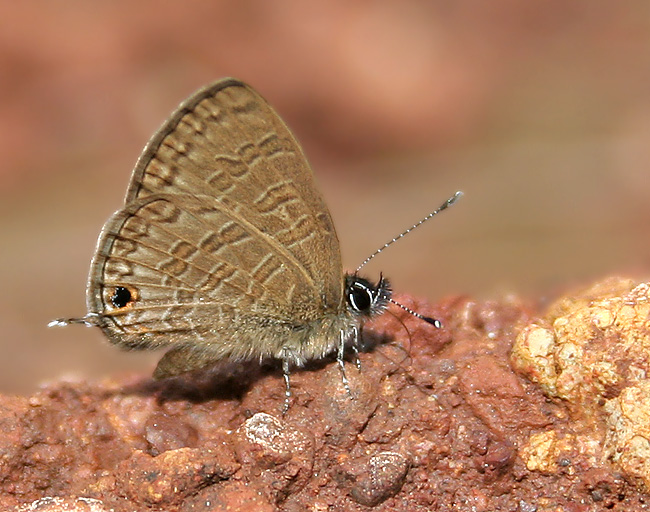
- Common lineblue (Prosotas nora) in Hyderabad, India

Scientific classification
- Kingdom: Animalia
- Phylum: Arthropoda
- Clade: Pancrustacea
- Class: Insecta
- Order: Lepidoptera
- Family: Lycaenidae
- Subfamily: Polyommatinae
- Tribe: Polyommatini
- Genus: Prosotas; H. H. Druce, 1891

= Prosotas =

Butterfly genus in family Lycaenidae

Prosotas is a genus of butterflies in the family Lycaenidae erected by Hamilton Herbert Druce in 1891. The species of this genus are found on New Guinea in the Australasian realm and the Indomalayan realm. An overview is provided by Hsu and Yen.

== Species ==
Species in alphabetical order:

- Prosotas aluta (H. Druce, 1873) – banded lineblue
- Prosotas atra (Tite, 1963) New Britain°
- Prosotas bhutea (de Nicéville, [1884]) – Bhutya lineblue
- Prosotas datarica (Snellen, 1892) Indonesia, Java.
- Prosotas dilata (Evans, 1932)
- Prosotas dubiosa (Semper, [1879]) – small purple lineblue, tailess lineblue
- Prosotas ella (Toxopeus, 1930) Sulawesi
- Prosotas elsa (Grose-Smith, 1895) Indonesia, Moluccas, Ambon
- Prosotas felderi (Murray, 1874) – Felder's line blue Queensland
- Prosotas gracilis (Röber, 1886)
- Prosotas lutea (Martin, 1895)
- Prosotas maputi (Semper, 1889) Philippines
- Prosotas nelides (de Nicéville, 1895) Indonesia, Sumatra
- Prosotas nora (Felder, 1860) – common lineblue
- Prosotas noreia (Felder, 1868) – white-tipped lineblue
- Prosotas norina (Toxopeus, 1929) Indonesia, Java
- Prosotas papuana (Tite, 1963) New Guinea, Hydrographer Mountains
- Prosotas pia (Toxopeus, 1929) – margined lineblue
- Prosotas talesea (Tite, 1963) New Britain
