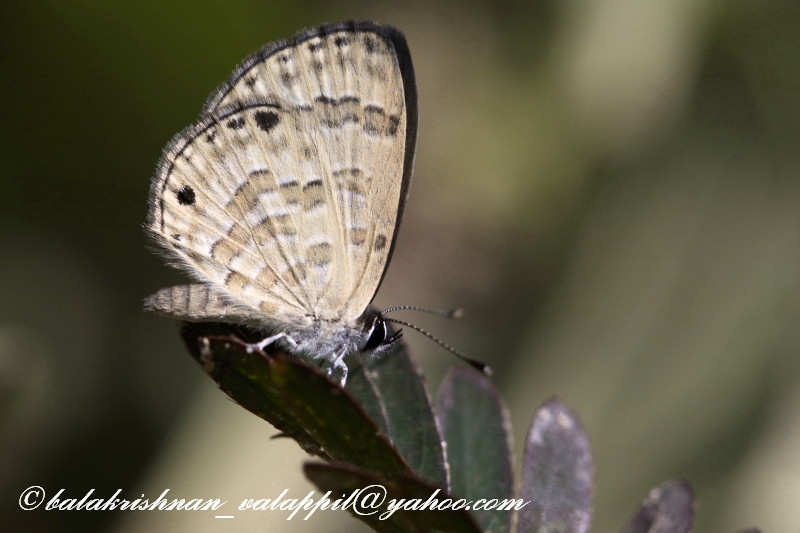

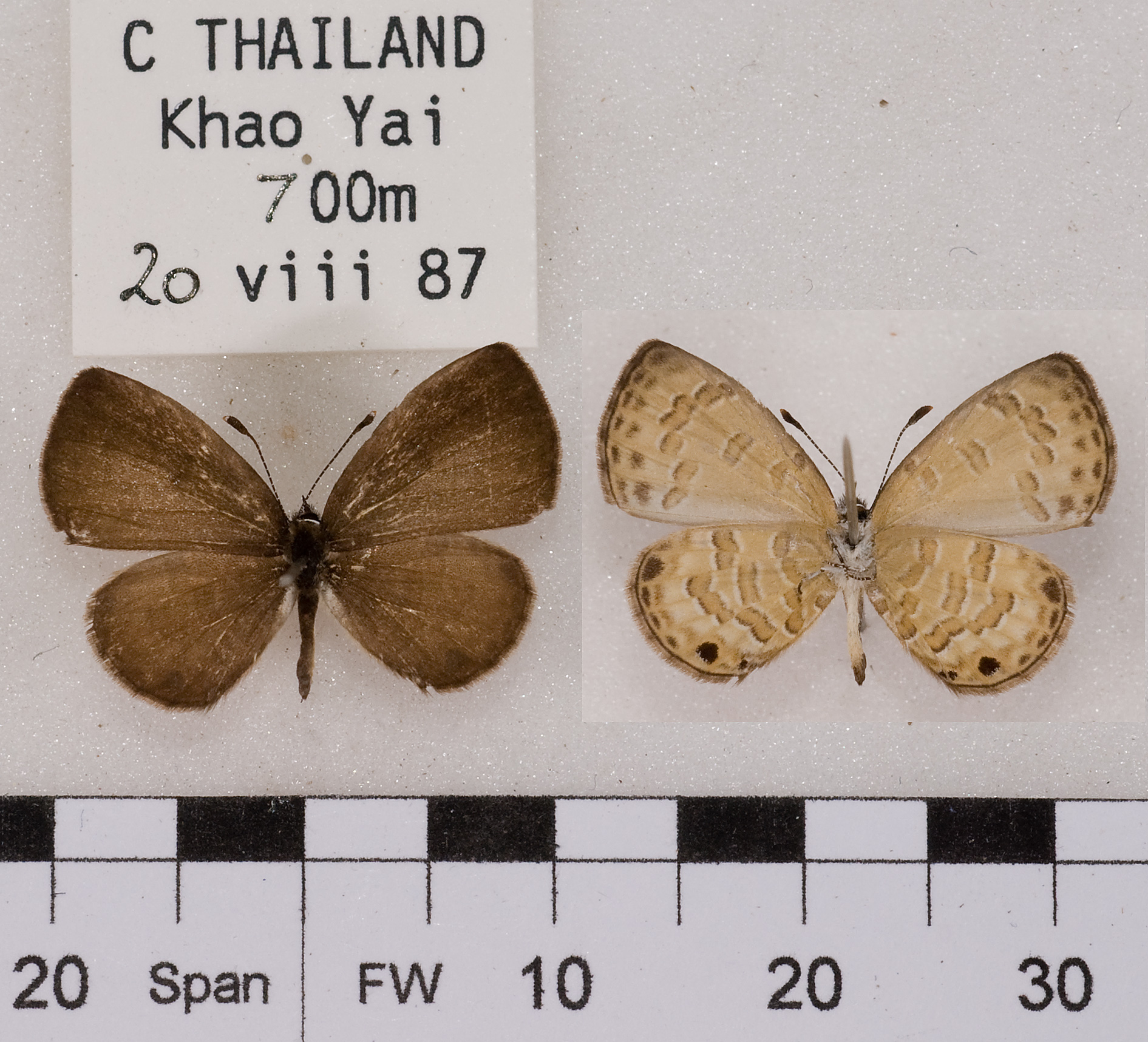
- Prosotas lutea sivoka (Evans, 1910)

Scientific classification
- Kingdom: Animalia
- Phylum: Arthropoda
- Clade: Pancrustacea
- Class: Insecta
- Order: Lepidoptera
- Family: Lycaenidae
- Genus: Prosotas
- Species: P. lutea

Binomial name
- Prosotas lutea (Martin, 1895)

= Prosotas lutea =

Species of butterfly

Prosotas lutea or Brown Lineblue is a species of blue (Lycaenidae) butterfly found in Asia.

== Range ==
The butterfly occurs in India from in the Himalayas from Sikkim onto Peninsular Malaysia and Sumatra towards the south and southern Yunnan to the east.

== See also ==
- List of butterflies of India (Lycaenidae)
