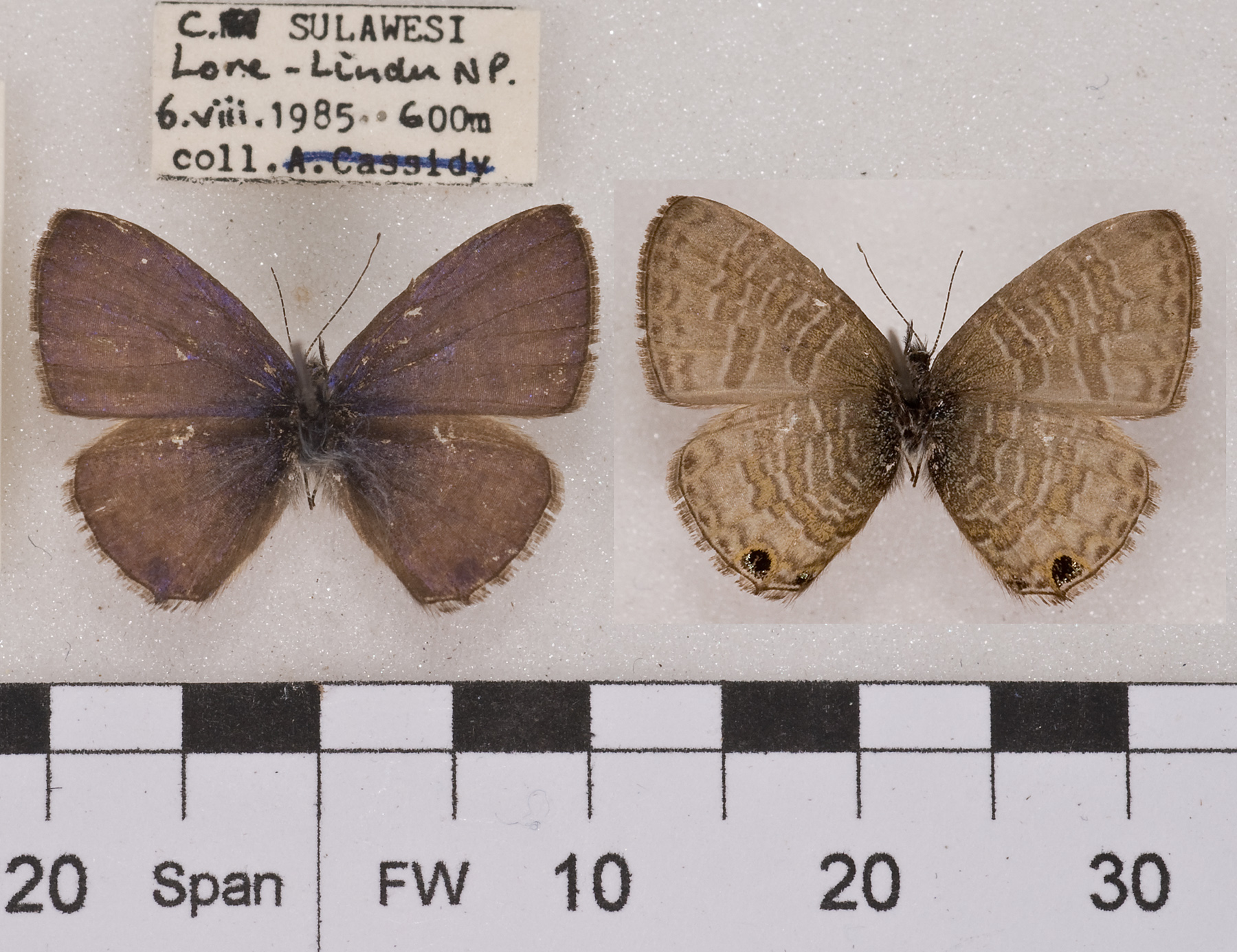
- Prosotas pia elioti male upper and underside
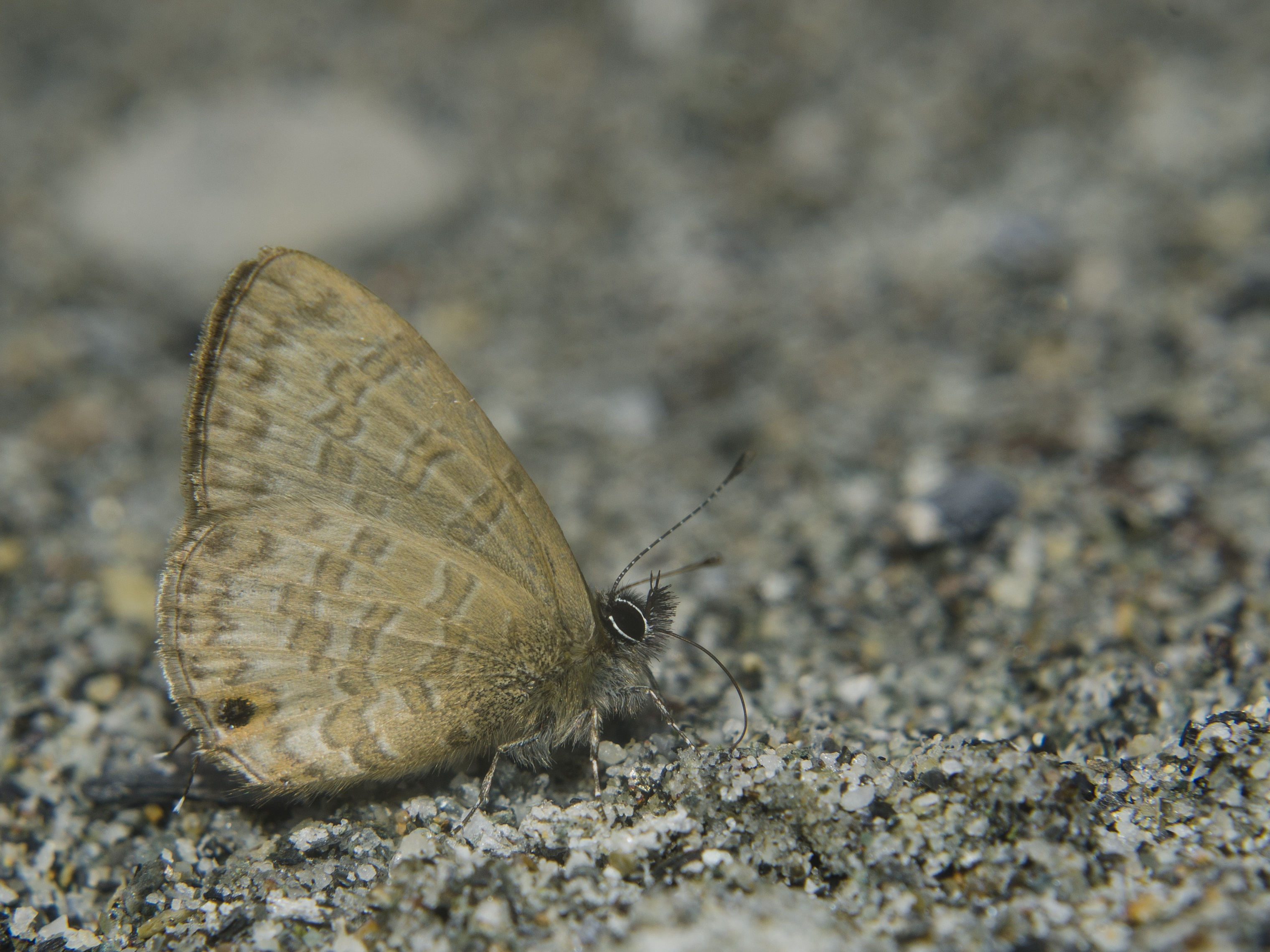

Scientific classification
- Domain: Eukaryota
- Kingdom: Animalia
- Phylum: Arthropoda
- Class: Insecta
- Order: Lepidoptera
- Family: Lycaenidae
- Genus: Prosotas
- Species: P. pia

Binomial name
- Prosotas pia Toxopeus, 1929

= Prosotas pia =

Margined lineblue

Species of butterfly

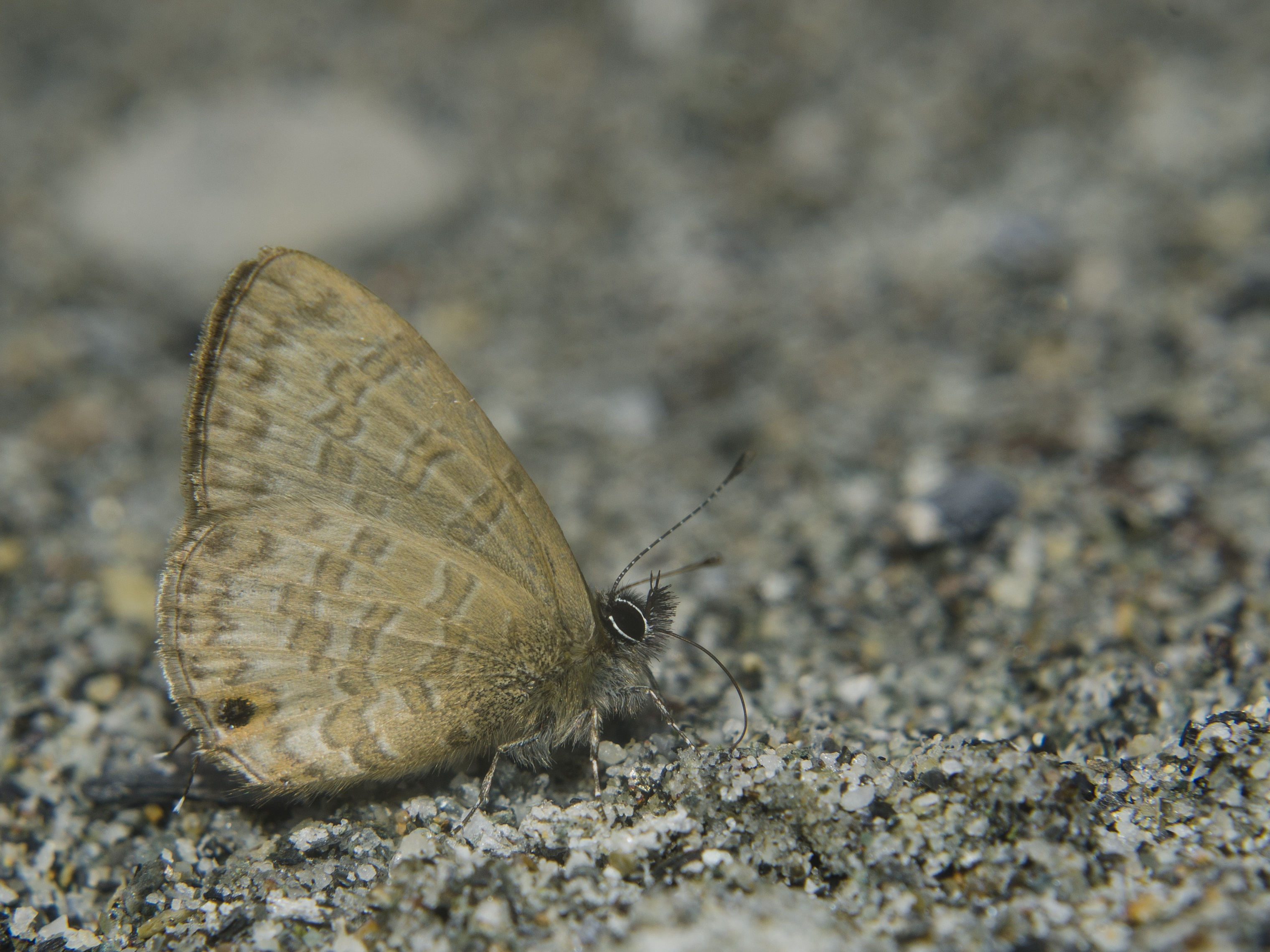
Close wing mud-pudding of Prosotas pia Toxopeus, 1929 – Additional Lineblue

Prosotas pia, the margined lineblue, is a species of blue (Lycaenidae) butterfly found in Asia.

== Range ==
The butterfly occurs in India from in the Himalayas from Sikkim to Assam and Naga hills. The range extends eastwards to Myanmar and southern Yunnan (Southwestern China). It also occurs in Sundaland, Sulawesi and Serang in South-East Asia.

== See also ==
- List of butterflies of India (Lycaenidae)
