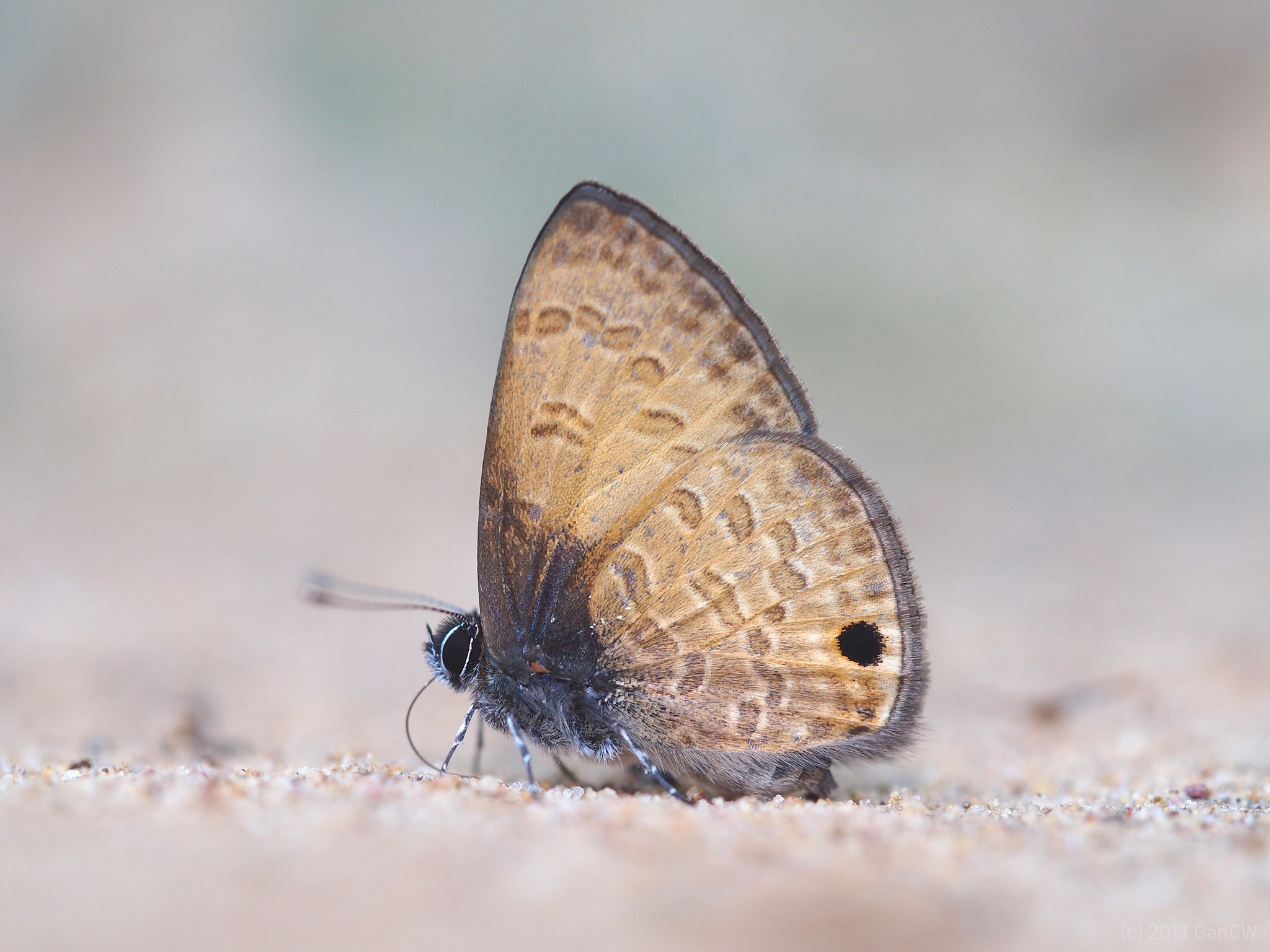
- Underside
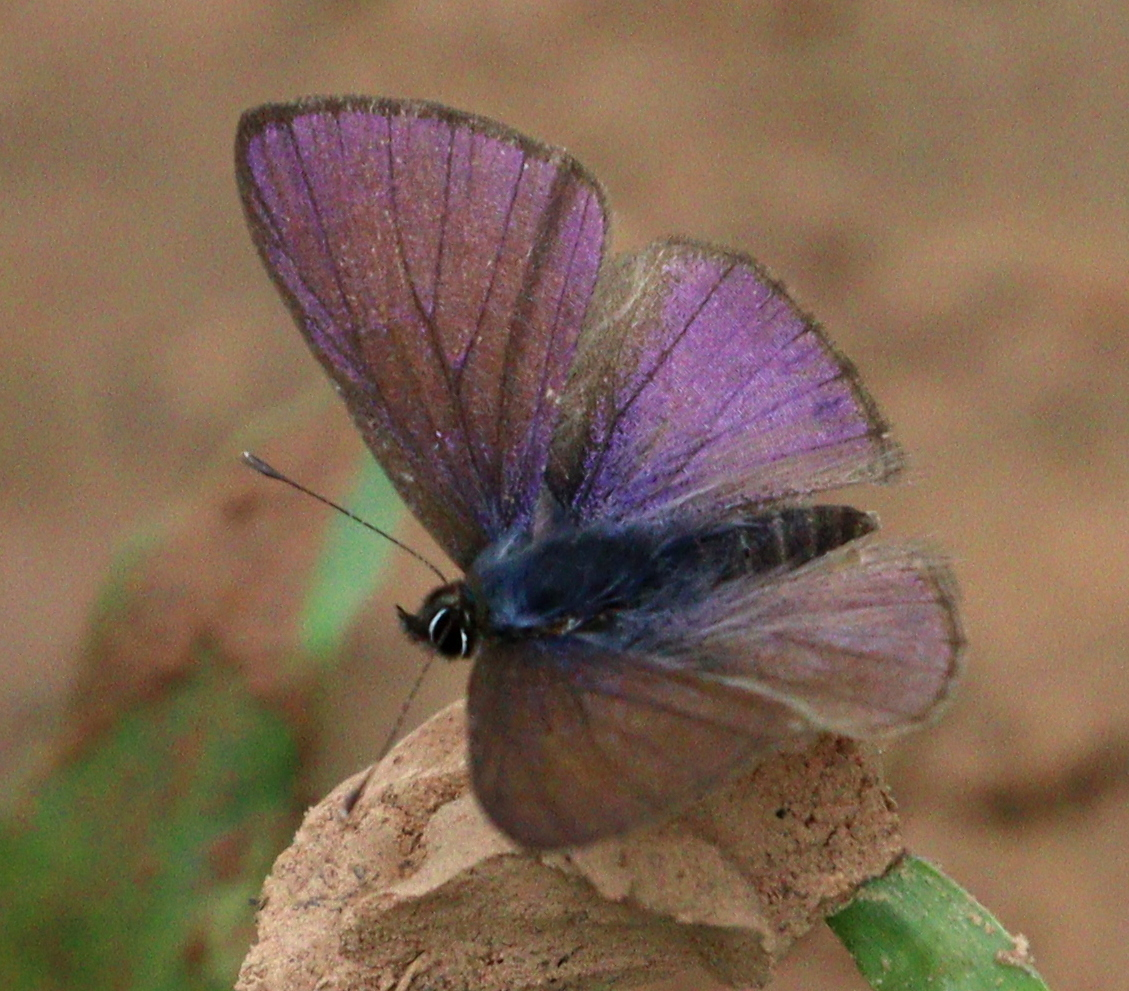
- Upperside

Scientific classification
- Kingdom: Animalia
- Phylum: Arthropoda
- Class: Insecta
- Order: Lepidoptera
- Family: Lycaenidae
- Genus: Prosotas
- Species: P. gracilis

Binomial name
- Prosotas gracilis (Röber, 1886)

Synonyms
- Plebeius gracilis Röber, 1886; Nacaduba gerydomaculata Rothschild, 1915; Prosotas gracilis bonthainica Toxopeus (nomen nudum); Lycaena donina Snellen, 1901; Nacaduba ni de Nicéville, 1902; Nacaduba basiatrata Strand, 1910; Nacaduba saturatior Rothschild, 1915

= Prosotas gracilis =

Species of butterfly

Prosotas gracilis or The Dark-based Lineblue is a butterfly in the family Lycaenidae. It was described by Julius Röber in 1886. It is found in the Indomalayan realm.

== Subspecies ==
- Prosotas gracilis gracilis (Moluccas)
- Prosotas gracilis donina (Snellen, 1901) (Java)
- Prosotas gracilis ni (de Nicéville, 1902) (Sumatra, Java, Peninsular Malaysia)
- Prosotas gracilis saturatior (Rothschild, 1915) (Vulcan Island)
