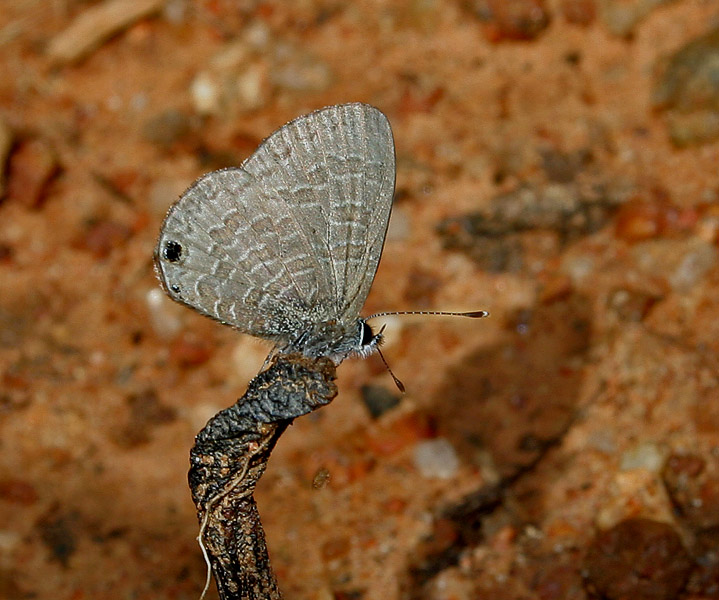
- In Talakona forest, in Chittoor district of Andhra Pradesh, India

Scientific classification
- Kingdom: Animalia
- Phylum: Arthropoda
- Clade: Pancrustacea
- Class: Insecta
- Order: Lepidoptera
- Family: Lycaenidae
- Genus: Prosotas
- Species: P. dubiosa

Binomial name
- Prosotas dubiosa (Semper, 1879)

= Prosotas dubiosa =

Tailless lineblue

Species of butterfly

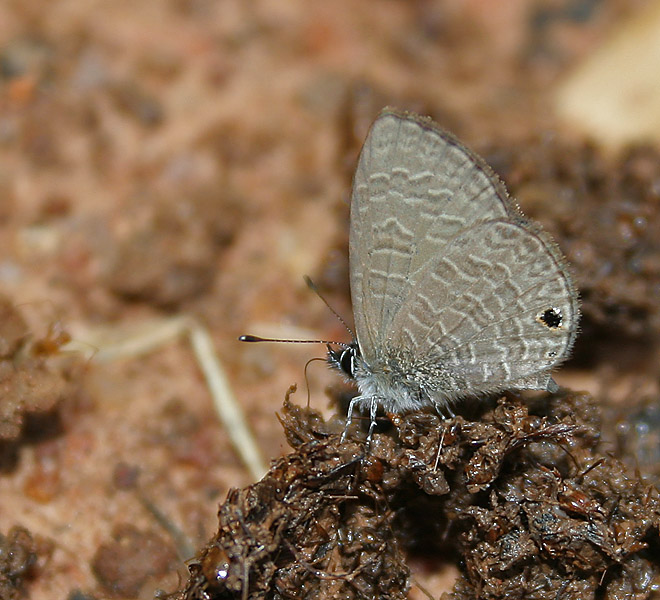
In Talakona forest, in Chittoor district of Andhra Pradesh, India

Prosotas dubiosa, the tailless lineblue or small purple lineblue, is a blue butterfly (Lycaenidae) found in Asia to Australia. The species was first described by Georg Semper in 1879.

Unlike many other species in the Prosotas genus, P. dubiosa does not have hair-like filaments ("tails") protruding from its hindwings, thus the tailless in its common name.

== Subspecies ==
The subspecies of Prosotas dubiosa are:

- Prosotas dubiosa dubiosa - Australia
- Prosotas dubiosa eborata (Tite, 1963) - Solomon Islands
- Prosotas dubiosa indica (Evans, [1925]) - India
- Prosotas dubiosa lumpura (Corbet, 1938) - Malay Peninsula
- Prosotas dubiosa subardates (Piepers & Snellen, 1918) - Java, Sulawesi

== Range ==
The butterfly occurs in Sri Lanka and peninsular India and the Himalayas from Sikkim to Assam. The range extends onto Myanmar and Yunnan, and, possibly Thailand, Peninsular Malaysia, Singapore, Hong Kong, Sumatra, Borneo and Java. Possibly Philippines and Sulawesi. Further east the butterfly occurs in Australia, New Guinea and the Solomon Islands. In Australia the butterfly occurs from Northern Australia to New South Wales (Coffs Harbour).

== Gallery ==
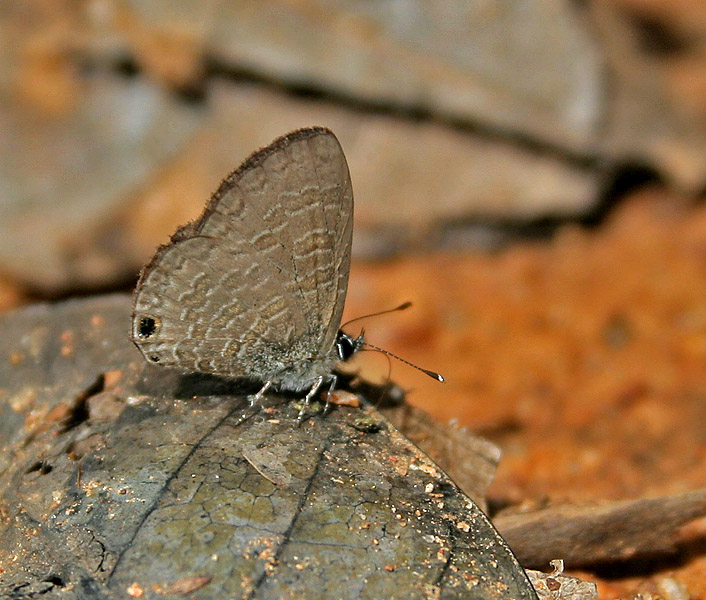
In Talakona forest, in Chittoor district of Andhra Pradesh, India

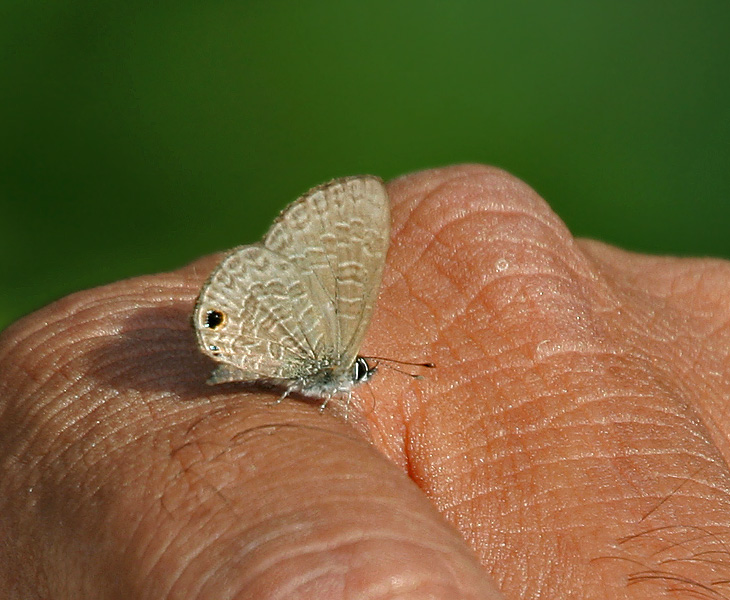
In Talakona forest, in Chittoor district of Andhra Pradesh, India

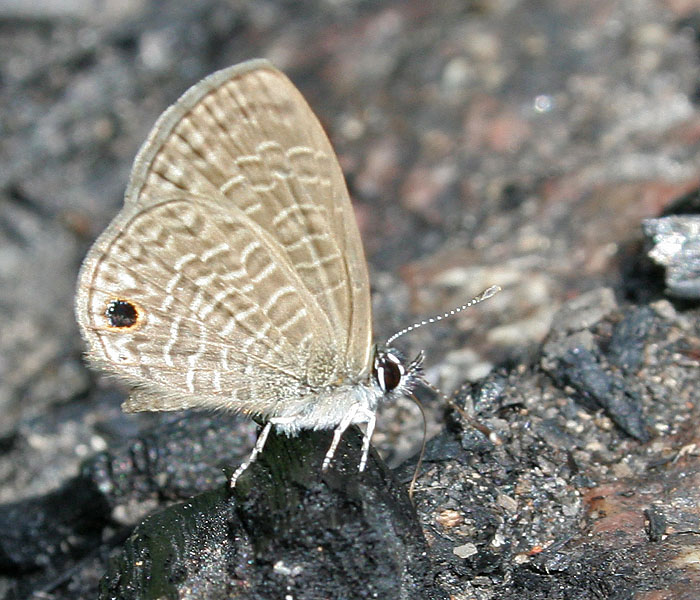
In Hyderabad, India

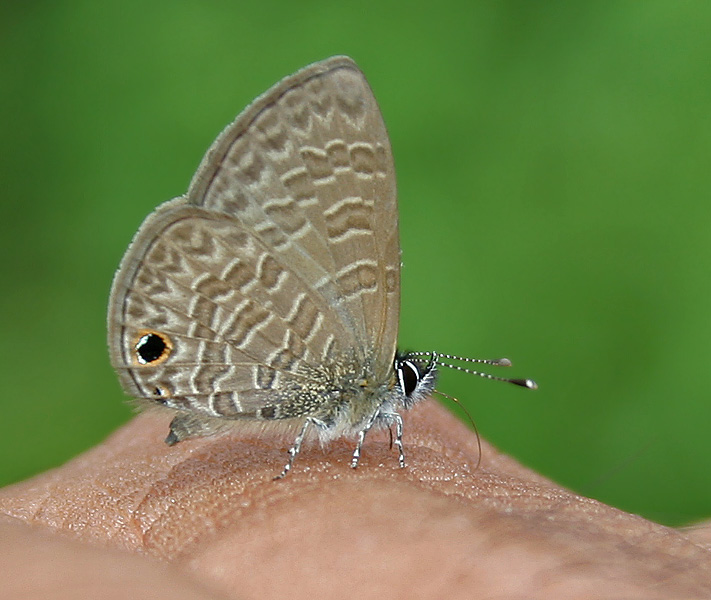
In Hyderabad

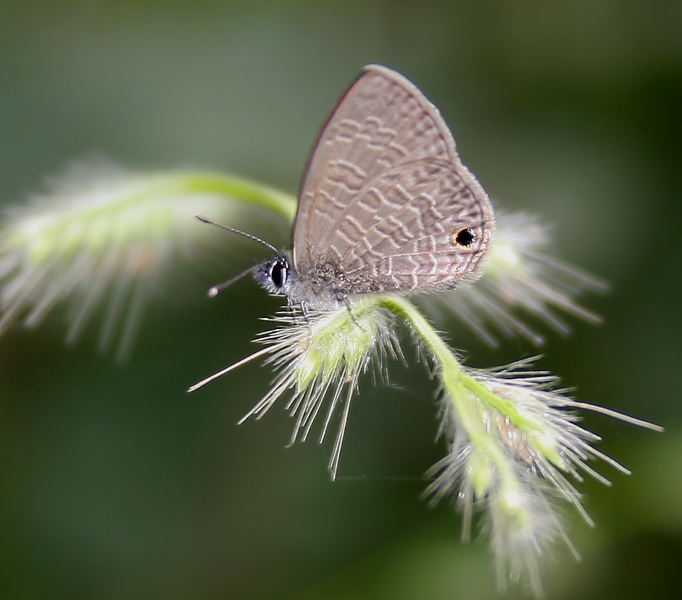
In Narsapur, Medak district, India

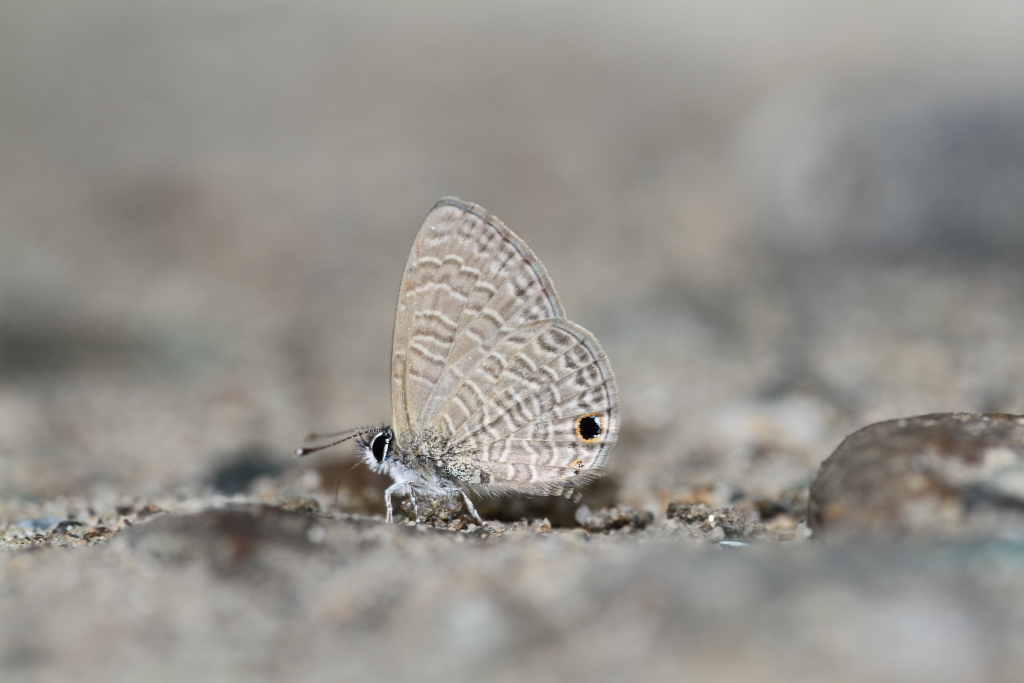

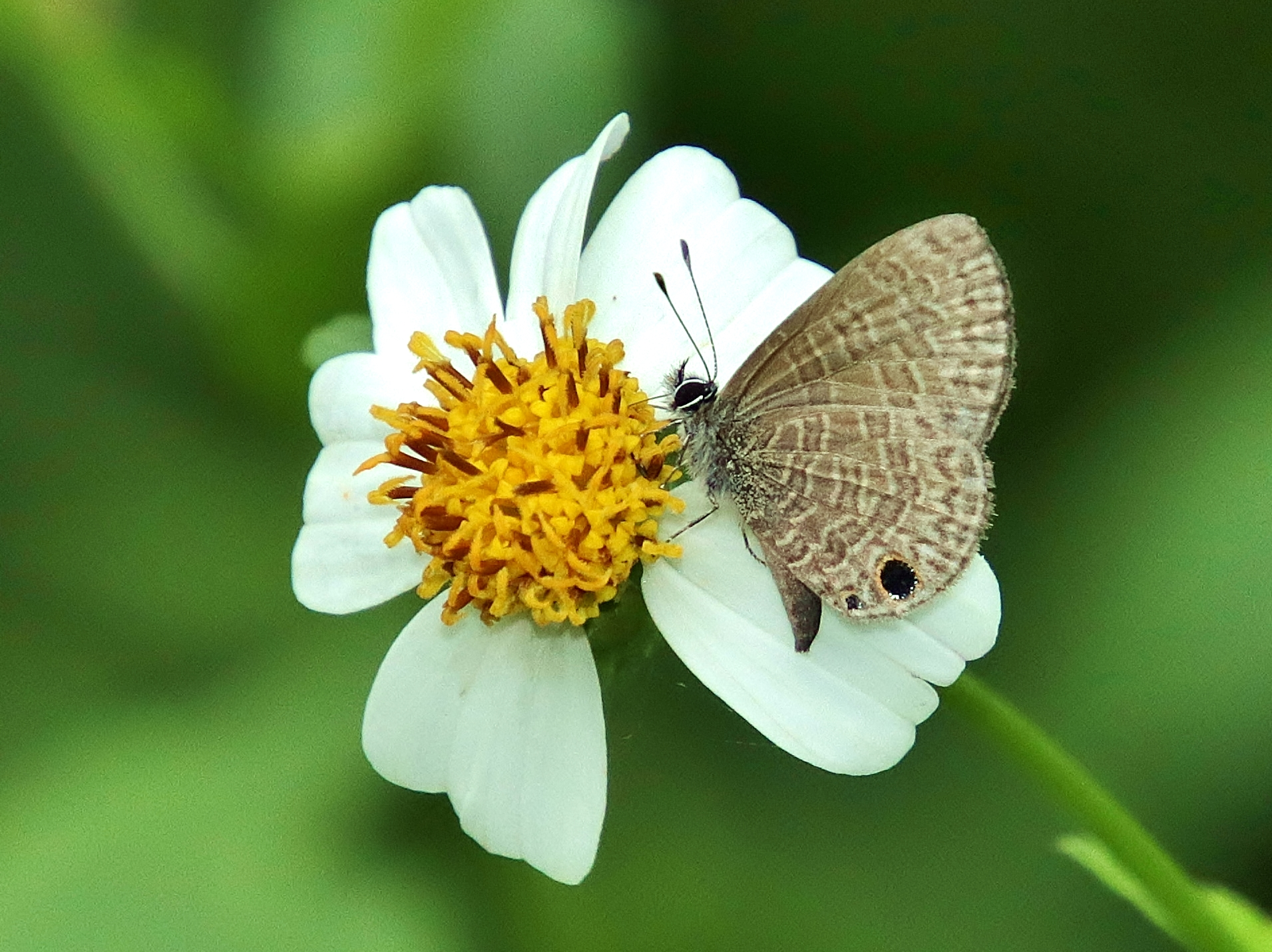
In Hong Kong

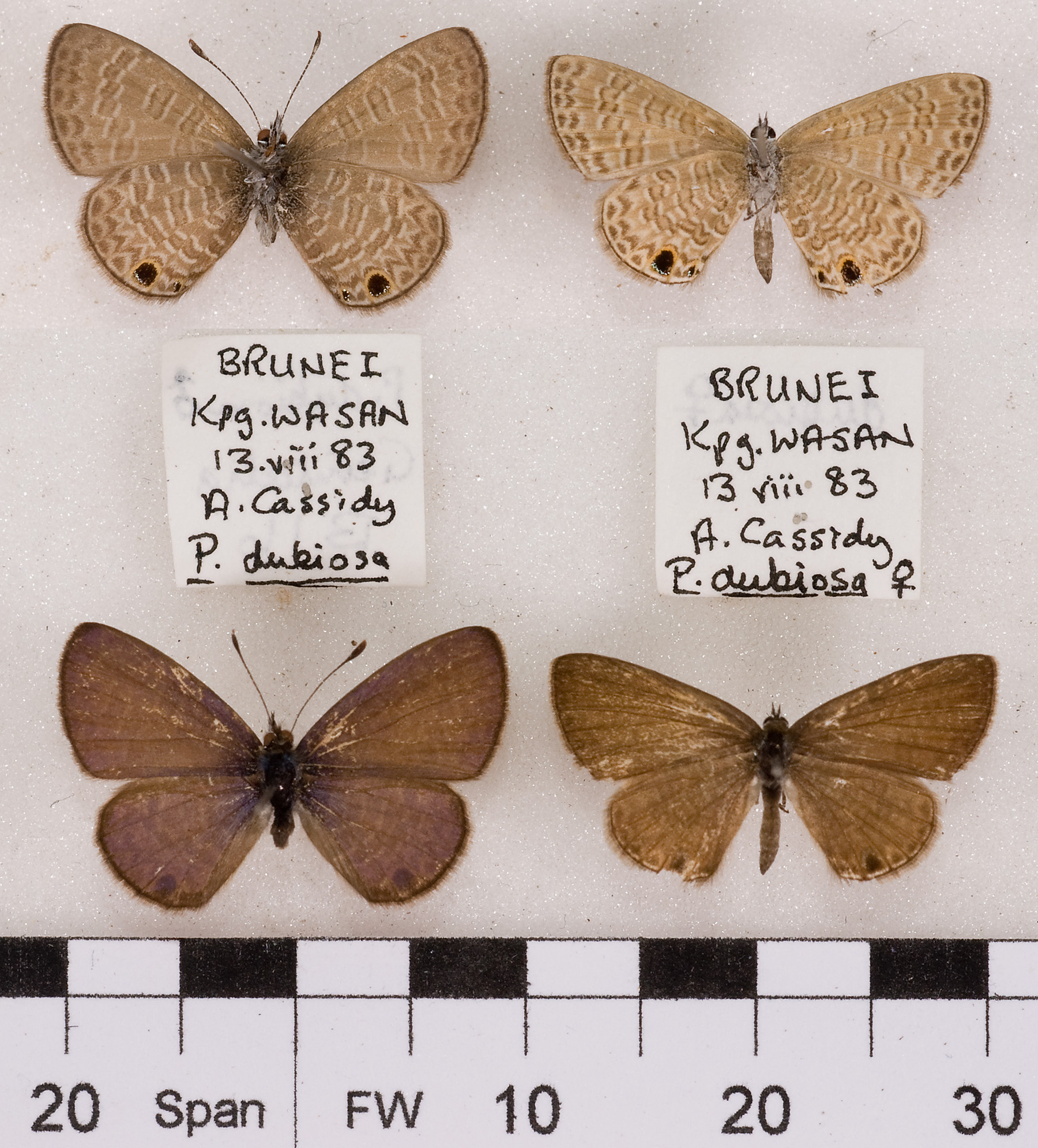
Specimens

== See also ==
- List of butterflies of India (Lycaenidae)
