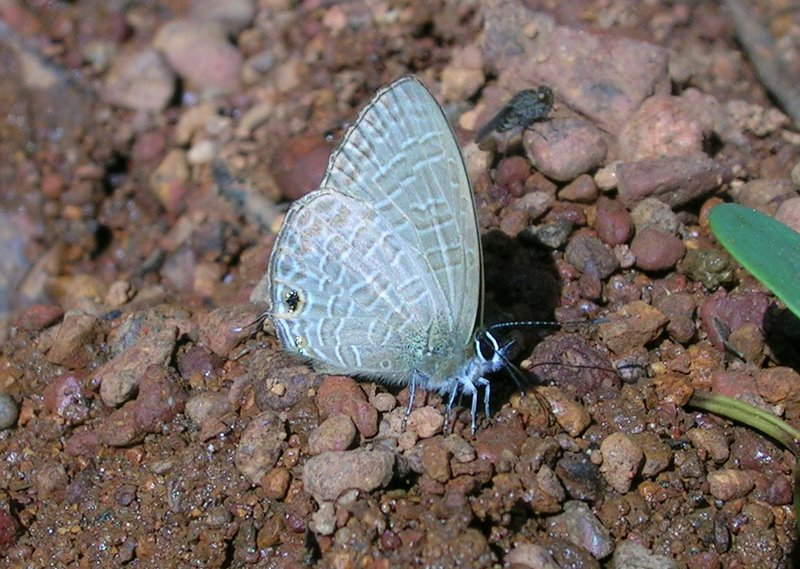

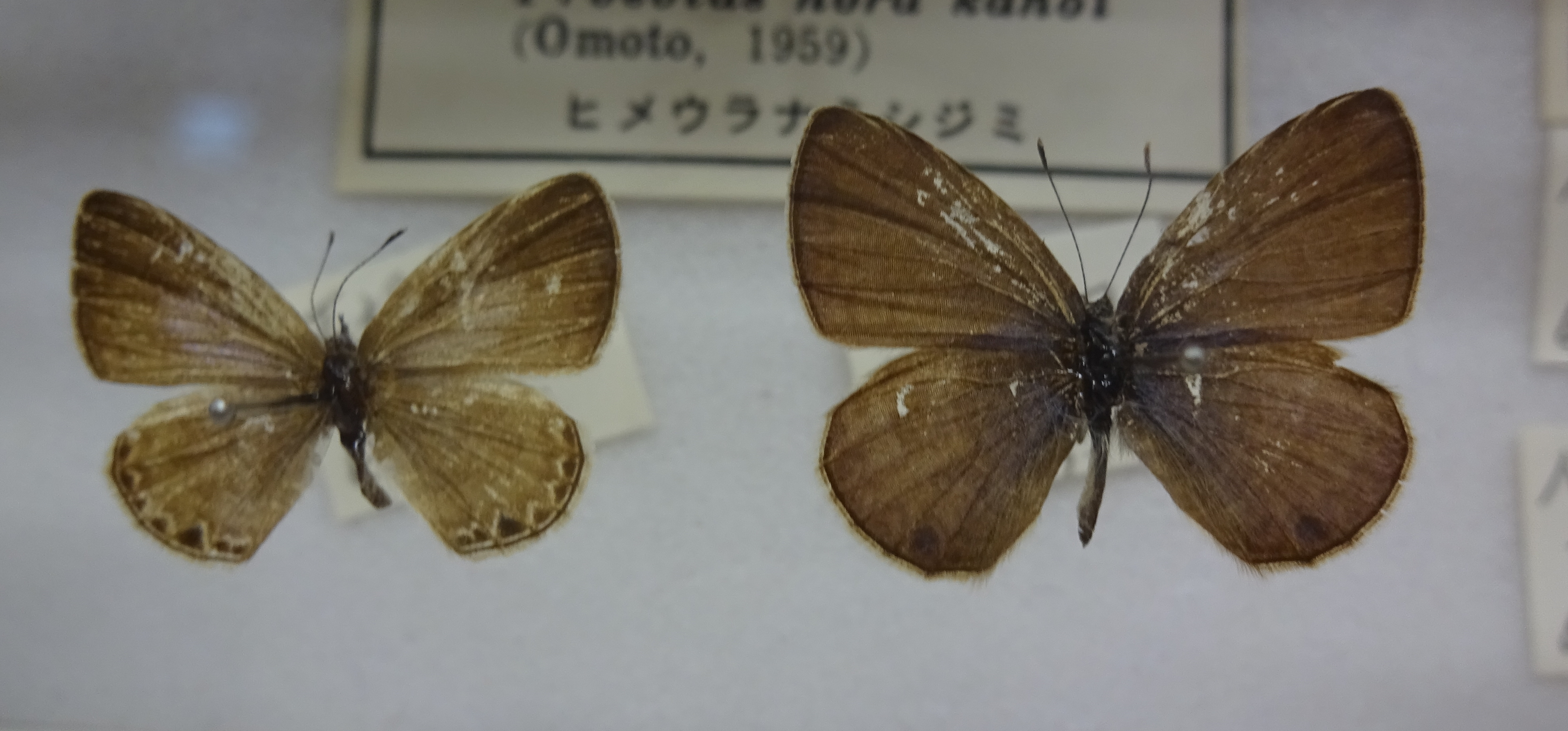

Scientific classification
- Kingdom: Animalia
- Phylum: Arthropoda
- Clade: Pancrustacea
- Class: Insecta
- Order: Lepidoptera
- Family: Lycaenidae
- Genus: Prosotas
- Species: P. nora

Binomial name
- Prosotas nora (R. Felder, 1860)

Synonyms
- Lycaena ardates Moore, [1875]

= Prosotas nora =

Common lineblue

Species of butterfly

Prosotas nora, the common lineblue, is a species of lycaenid butterfly found in Asia to Australia. The species was first described by Rudolf Felder in 1860.

== Description ==
Male upperside: purplish brown or purplish with a dark tint, some specimens brown with a very slight purplish sheen seen only in certain lights. Forewings and hindwings: nearly uniform, both with slender black anteciliary lines, the hindwing in addition with the costal and dorsal margins paler; in most specimens with a subterminal black spot in interspace 2, sometimes seen only by transparency from the underside; tail black tipped with white. Underside: brown, hoary, brownish or pale dull brown. Forewing: a subbasal pair of transverse white strigae, a shorter pair along the discocellulars and a discal pair; these strigae all narrowly edged on the inner sides of each pair with fuscous which gives the appearance of transverse bands somewhat darker than the ground colour; the subbasal pair extend from vein 1 to vein 12, the discocellular pair from upper to lower apex of cell and the discal pair are very irregular and dislocated at each vein, the whole having the appearance of a dark sinuous band; terminal markings often very faint and ill-defined or again fairly prominent and consisting of a double subterminal series of transversely linear, sometimes lunular, dark spots, with edgings paler than the ground colour; lastly, an anteciliary dark line. Hindwing: with transverse pairs of white, inwardly fuscous-edged strigae similar to those on the forewing, but even more irregular and broken; the subbasal pair extended from costa to vein 1, below which the dorsal area is whitish, the discocellular pair extend from the costa and posteriorly coalesce with the discal pair which are as irregular and dislocated as in the forewing; terminal markings similar to those on the forewing, but the double subterminal series of dark spots more lunular and a prominent round black subterminal spot crowned with ochraceous in interspace 2. Antenna, head, thorax and abdomen dark brown; the shafts of the antennae speckled with white; beneath: the palpi fringed with black, thorax dark greyish brown, abdomen white.

Female upperside: brownish purple, sometimes fuscous. Forewings and hindwings: as in the male with anteciliary dark lines, but differ as follows: Forewing: an iridescent bluish sheen from base outwards to disc; hindwing; a slender more or less prominent white line edging the anteciliary black line on the inner side, a sub terminal geminate (paired) double black spot in interspace 1 and a similar larger single spot in interspace 2. Underside: ground colour paler and brighter than in the male, the markings similar but more neatly and generally more clearly defined; both forewings and hindwings in most of the specimens have a white terminal line before the anteciliary dark line. Antennae, head, thorax and abdomen much as in the male.

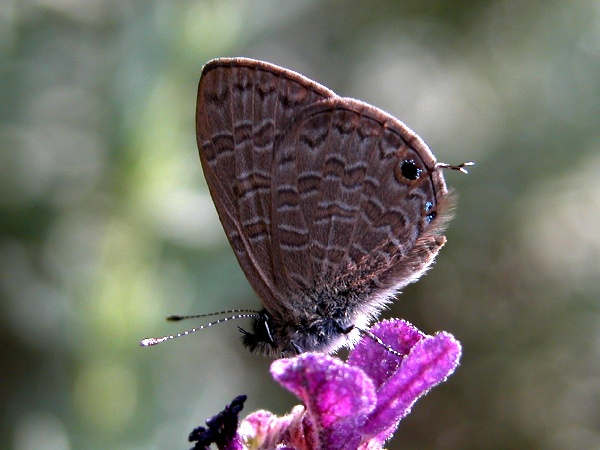
In Bangalore, India

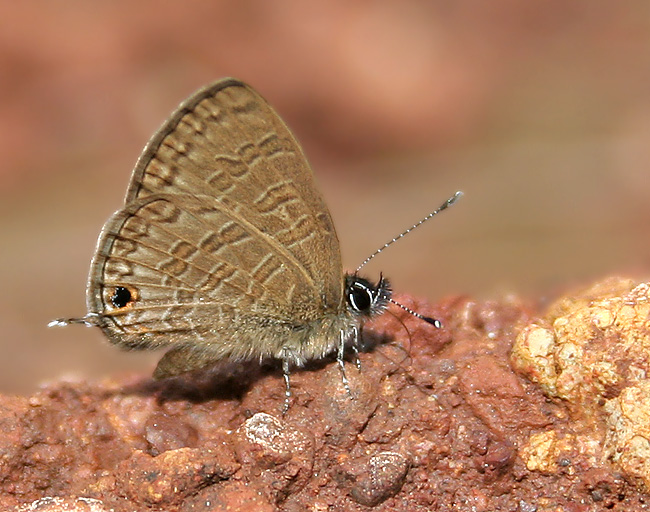
At Ananthagiri Hills, in Rangareddy district of Andhra Pradesh, India

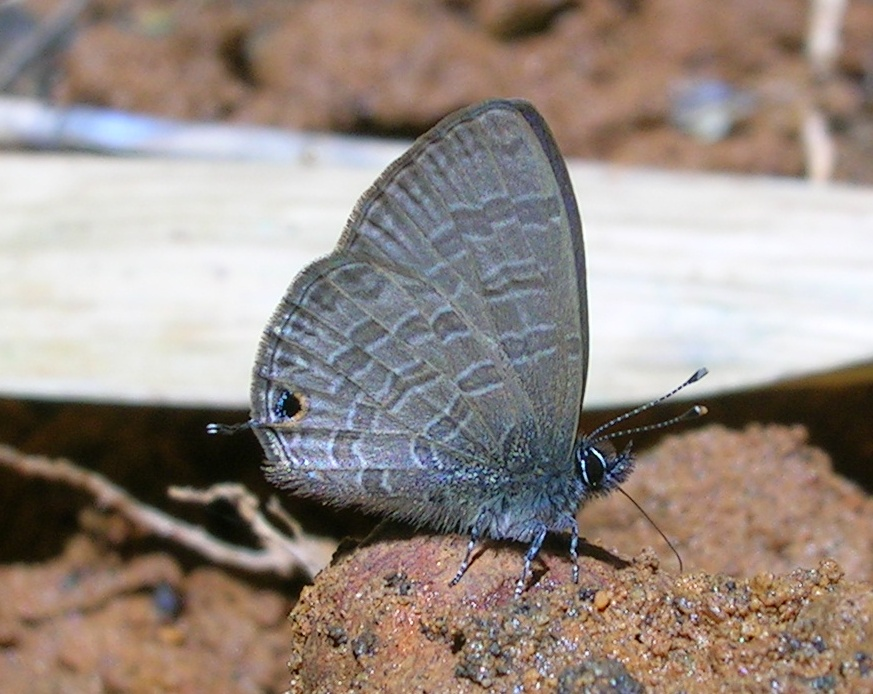

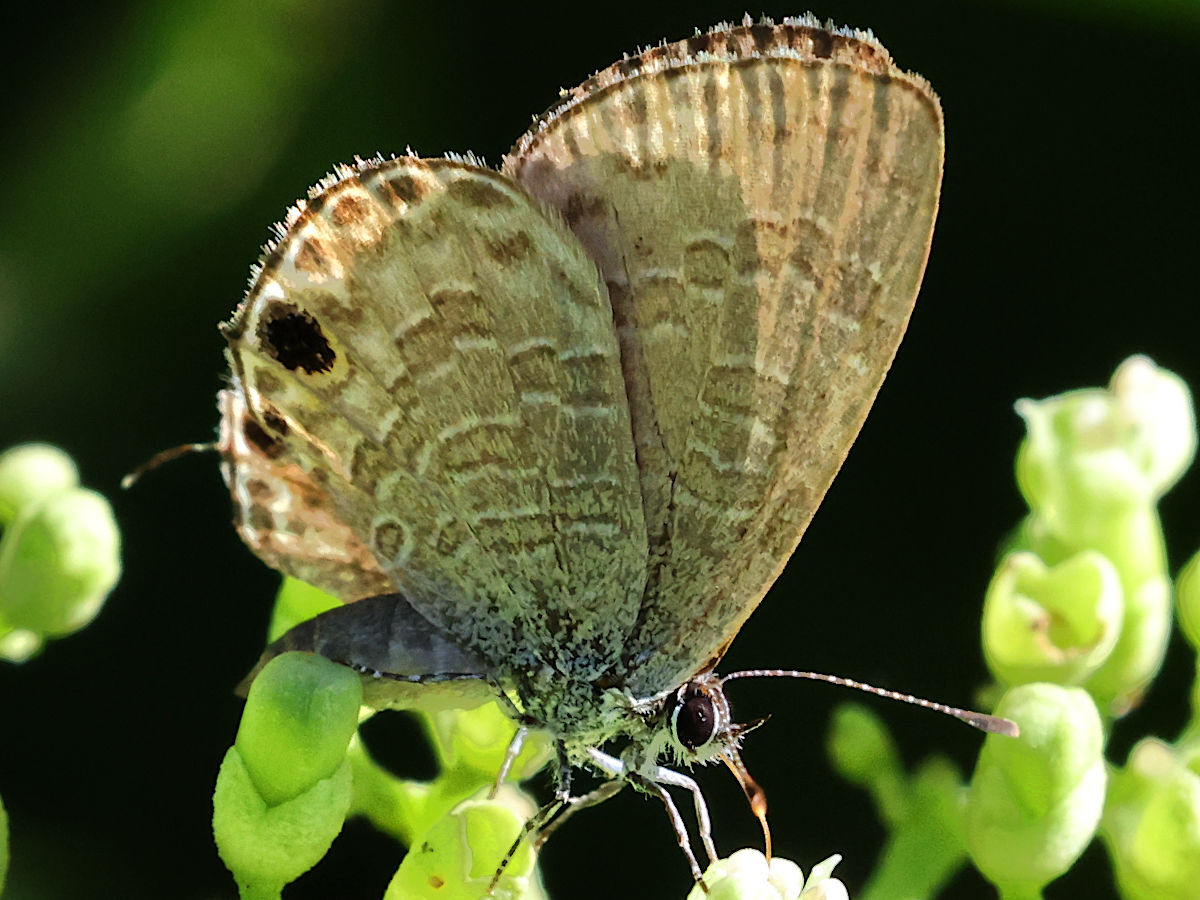
P. n. formosana, Taiwan

== Distribution ==
Peninsular India from the outer Himalayas to Travancore, avoiding the desert tracts; Sri Lanka; Assam; Myanmar; Cambodia; Tenasserim; the Andamans and Nicobars; extending into the Malayan subregion and to the Philippines.

== Subspecies ==
- P. n. ardates (Moore, [1875])
- P. n. auletes (Waterhouse & Lyell, 1914)
- P. n. caliginosa H. H. Druce, 1891
- P. n. dilata (Evans, 1932)
- P. n. formosana (Fruhstorfer, 1916)
- P. n. fulva (Evans, 1925)
- P. n. kupu (Kheil, 1884)
- P. n. meraha (Fruhstorfer, 1916)
- P. n. nora (Felder, 1860)
- P. n. semperi (Fruhstorfer, 1916)
- P. n. superdates (Fruhstorfer, 1916)

== Biology ==
Prosotas nora has modifications of the female genitalia to cope with a peculiar ovipositing habit in ramose- or head-type inflorescences. The ova are inserted into tightly arranged flower buds of the inflorescences, either singly or several in a mass, and were concealed by a transparent gelatinous substance. Larval host plants are several Fabaceae species, for example Acacia and Mimosa species, Allophylus cobbe and Sandoricum koetjape in Sapindaceae in Sapindales, Itea oldhamii in Saxifragaceae and Bischofia javanica in Euphorbiaceae, Murraya koenigii. Prosotas nora is a specialized flower/flower bud feeder as larva. The larva ecloses from the egg laterally and feeds exclusively on inflorescences.

== See also ==
- List of butterflies of India (Lycaenidae)
