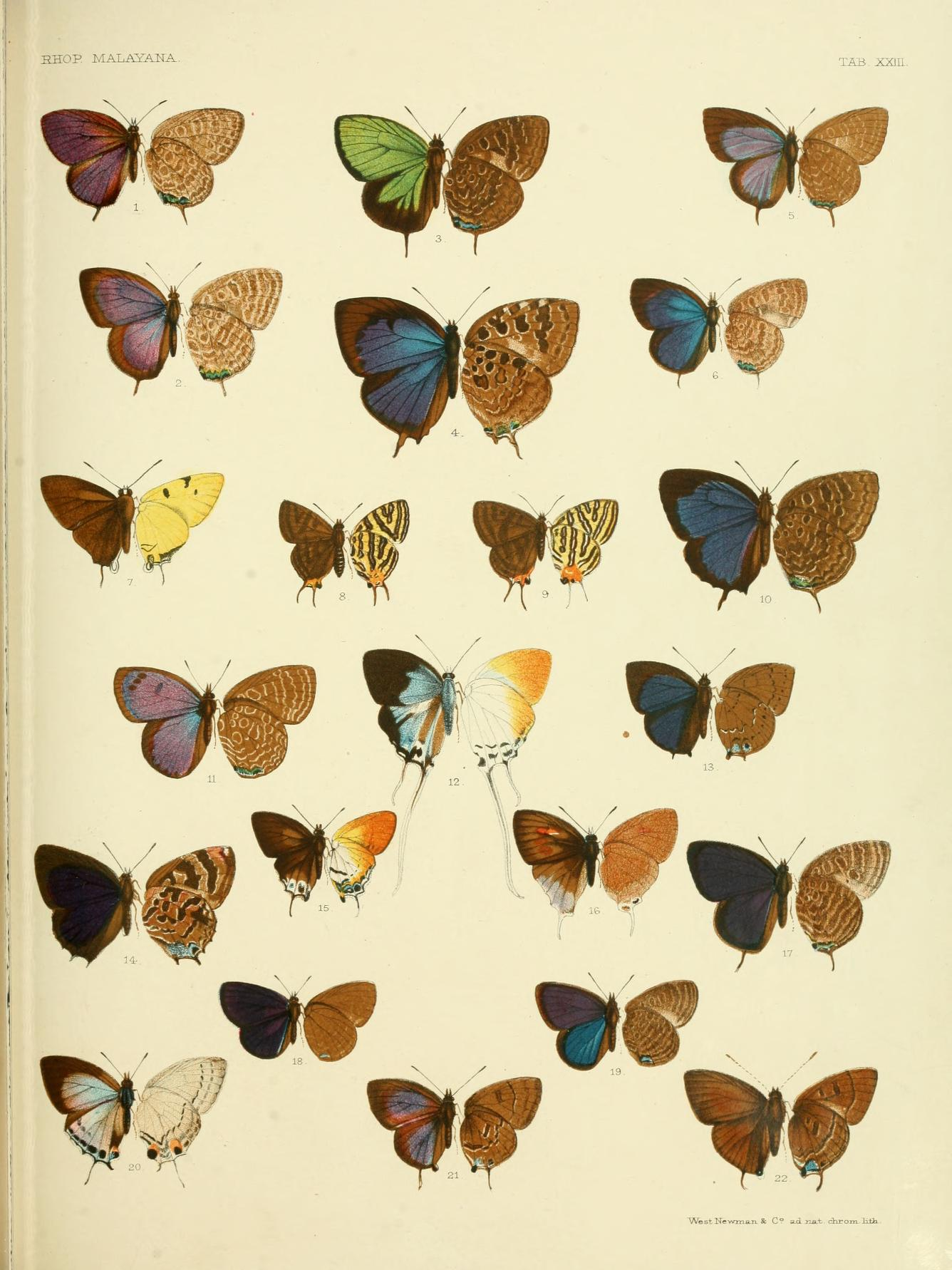
- Arhopala antimuta in Rhopalocera Malayana

Scientific classification
- Kingdom: Animalia
- Phylum: Arthropoda
- Clade: Pancrustacea
- Class: Insecta
- Order: Lepidoptera
- Family: Lycaenidae
- Genus: Arhopala
- Species: A. antimuta

Binomial name
- Arhopala antimuta (C. and R.Felder, 1865

= Arhopala antimuta =

Small tailess oakblue

Species of butterfly

Arhopala antimuta or small tailess oakblue is a butterfly in the family Lycaenidae. It was described by Cajetan Felder and Rudolf Felder in 1865. It is found in the Indomalayan realm.

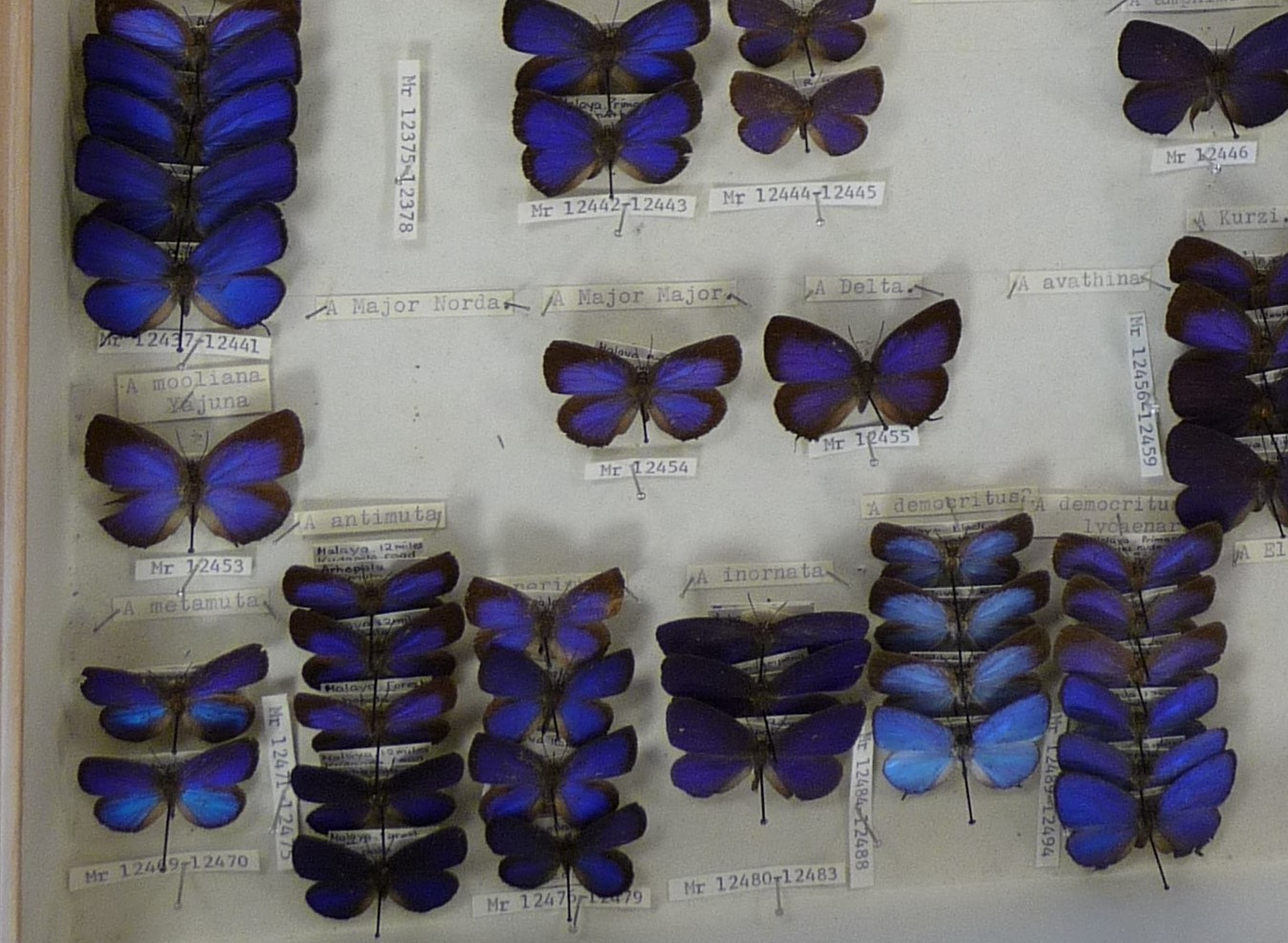
Arhopala antimuta and other Arhopala Wilcocks collection

A. antimutaFldr. is allied to metamuta and hypomuta and entirely resembles above gunongensis, except that the black margin of the male wings is somewhat broader and the whole insect smaller.

== Subspecies ==
- A. a. antimuta Burma, Mergui, Thailand, Langkawi, Peninsular Malaya, Singapore, Sumatra, Nias, Natuna
- A. a. timana Corbet, 1941 Borneo, Bangka
