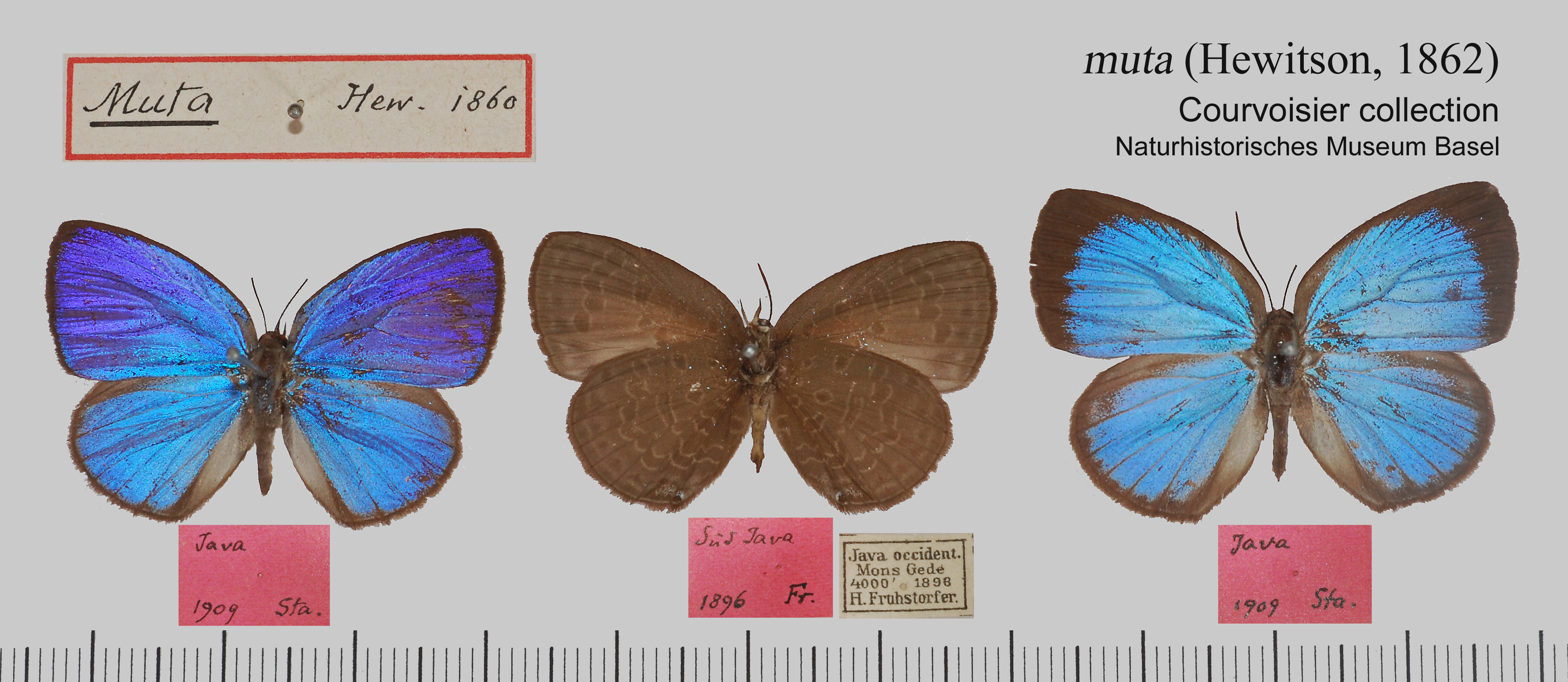
- Arhopala muta Courvoisier Collection, Basel

Scientific classification
- Kingdom: Animalia
- Phylum: Arthropoda
- Clade: Pancrustacea
- Class: Insecta
- Order: Lepidoptera
- Family: Lycaenidae
- Genus: Arhopala
- Species: A. muta

Binomial name
- Arhopala muta (Hewitson, 1862)

Synonyms
- Amblypodia muta Hewitson, 1862; Arhopala trima Corbet, 1941; Arhopala maranda Corbet, 1941; Arhopala wallacei Corbet, 1941; Arhopala waterstradti Bethune-Baker, 1896; Arhopala merguiana Corbet, 1941; Narathura muta gloria Evans, 1957

= Arhopala muta =

Species of butterfly

Arhopala muta (mutal oakblue) is a species of butterfly belonging to the lycaenid family described by William Chapman Hewitson in 1862. It is found in Southeast Asia (Thailand, Burma, Mergui, Peninsular Malaya, Thailand, Java, Sumatra, Borneo)

A small species with a darker tint and violet reflection in the distal portion of the forewing, which slightly contrasts with the lighter blue hindwing, though by no means so much as in metamuta which besides shows a black distal margin on both wings (also in the male ).The under surface is dark brown, very scantily marked.

== Subspecies ==
- Arhopala muta muta (Java)
- Arhopala muta trima Corbet, 1941 (Sumatra)
- Arhopala muta maranda Corbet, 1941 (Peninsular Malaysia, Thailand)
- Arhopala muta wallacei Corbet, 1941 (Sumatra)
- Arhopala muta waterstradti Bethune-Baker, 1896 (Borneo)
- Arhopala muta merguiana Corbet, 1941 (Thailand, Burma, Mergui)
- Arhopala muta gloria (Evans, 1957) (Nias)
