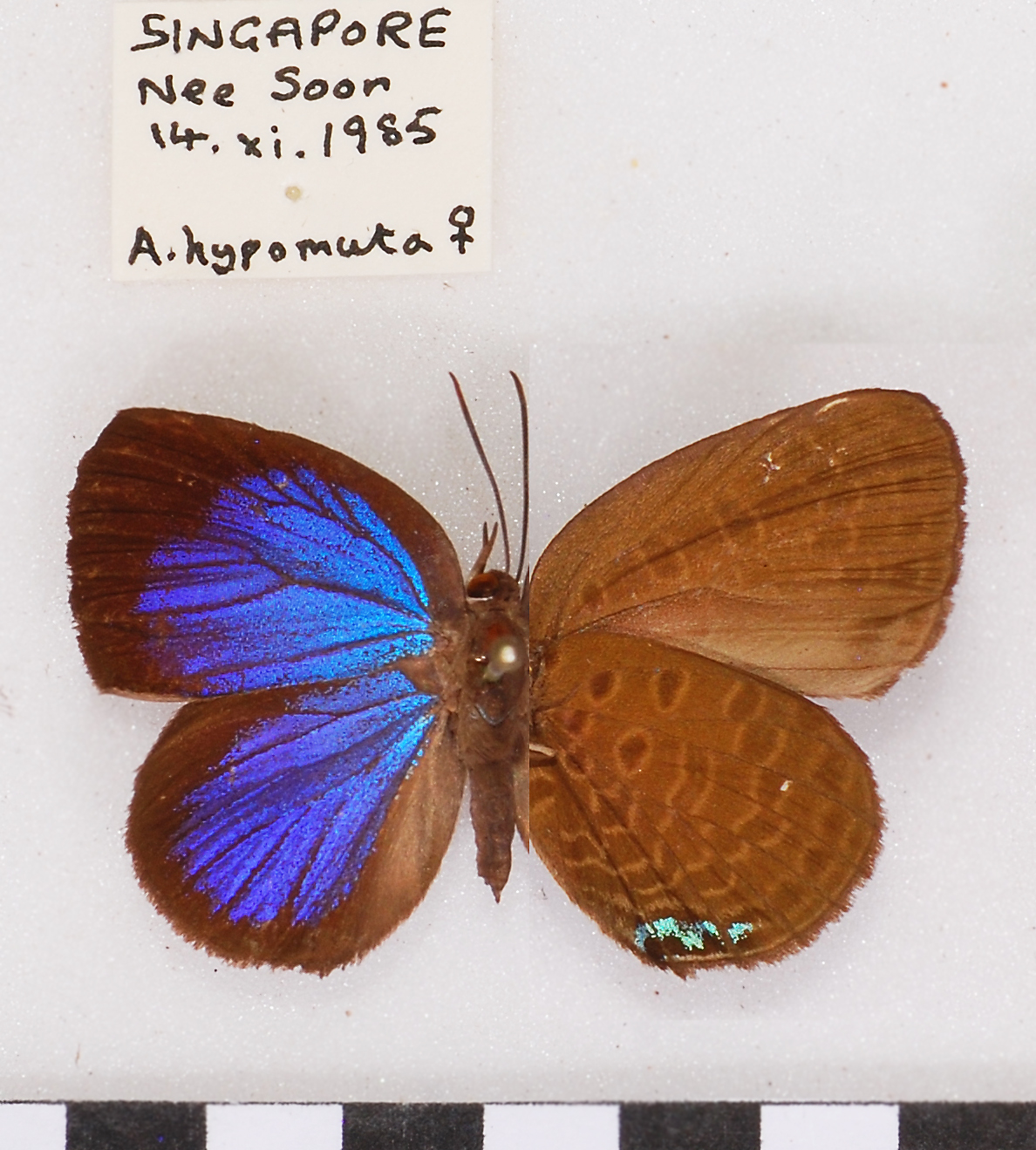
- Arhopala hypomuta hypomuta female, Singapore

Scientific classification
- Kingdom: Animalia
- Phylum: Arthropoda
- Clade: Pancrustacea
- Class: Insecta
- Order: Lepidoptera
- Family: Lycaenidae
- Genus: Arhopala
- Species: A. hypomuta

Binomial name
- Arhopala hypomuta (Hewitson, 1862)

Synonyms
- Amblypodia hypomuta Hewitson, 1862; Arhopala deva Bethune-Baker, 1896; Arhopala shelfordi Moulton, [1912]

= Arhopala hypomuta =

Species of butterfly

Arhopala hypomuta is a species of butterfly belonging to the lycaenid family described by William Chapman Hewitson in 1862. It is found in Southeast Asia (Thailand, Malay Peninsula, Sumatra).

Dark violettish-blue, the male with an almost linear black margin of the wings, the under surface very regularly marked with rings and bands that are filled up not much darker than the ground-colour. The anal blue of the hindwing is distinct and lustrous.

== Subspecies ==
- Arhopala hypomuta hypomuta (Thailand, Malay Peninsula, Sumatra)
- Arhopala hypomuta deva Bethune-Baker, 1896 (Borneo)
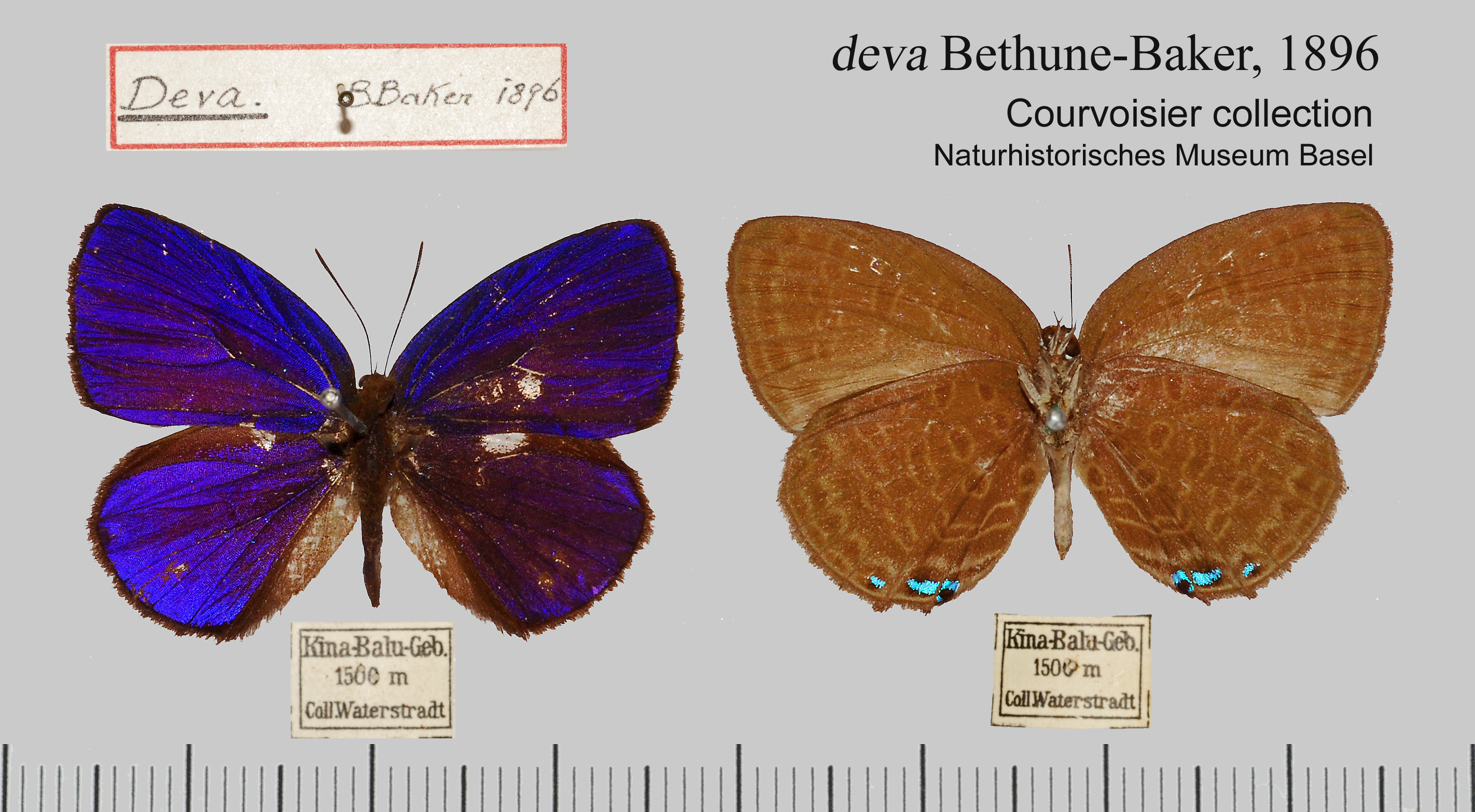
A. h. deva male and female North Borneo Courvoisier Collection, Basel

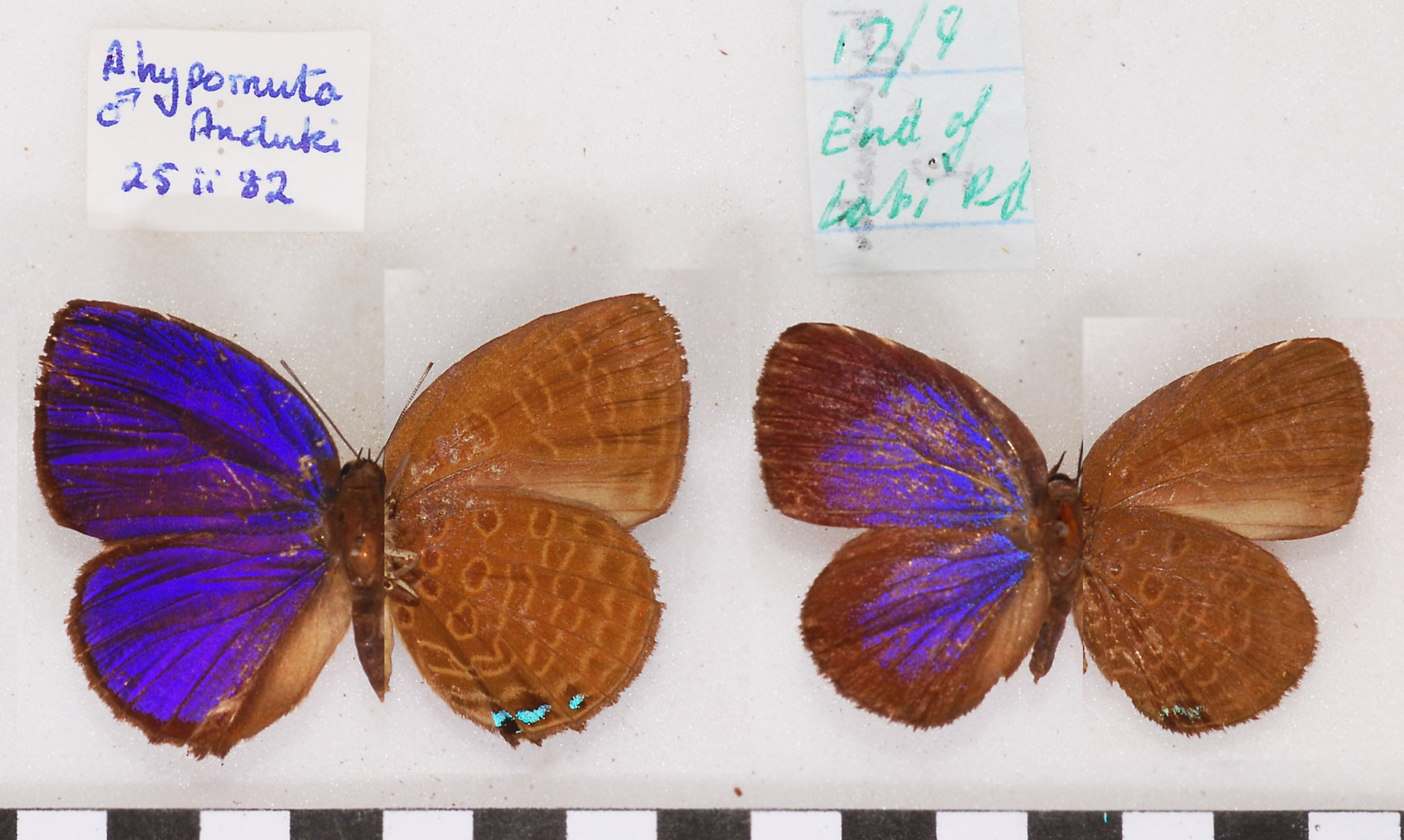
A. h. deva male and female Brunei
