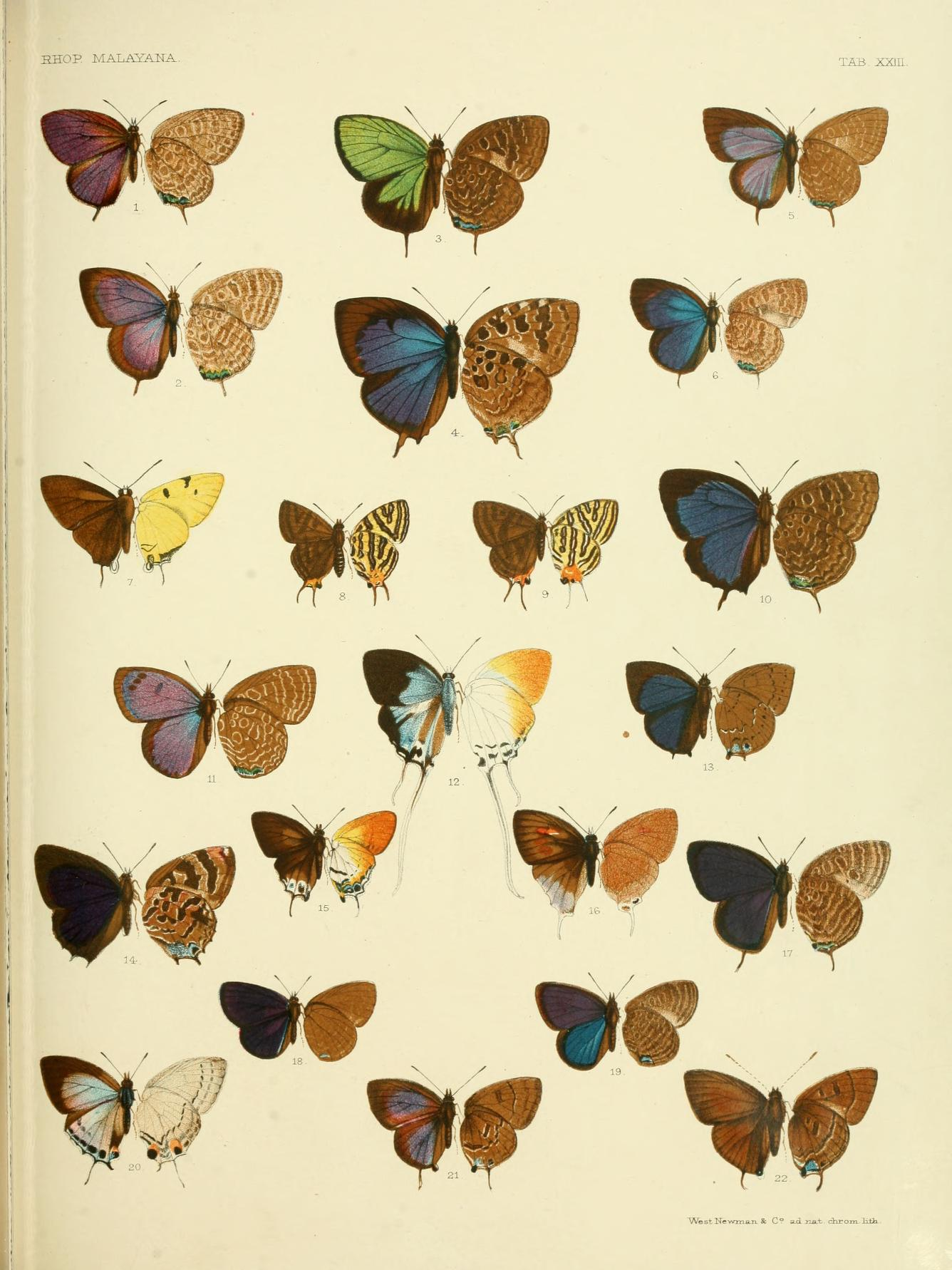
- Arhopala metamuta in Rhopalocera Malayana

Scientific classification
- Kingdom: Animalia
- Phylum: Arthropoda
- Clade: Pancrustacea
- Class: Insecta
- Order: Lepidoptera
- Family: Lycaenidae
- Genus: Arhopala
- Species: A. metamuta

Binomial name
- Arhopala metamuta (Hewitson, [1863])

= Arhopala metamuta =

Species of butterfly

Arhopala metamuta is a butterfly in the family Lycaenidae. It was described by William Chapman Hewitson in 1863. It is found in the Indomalayan realm.

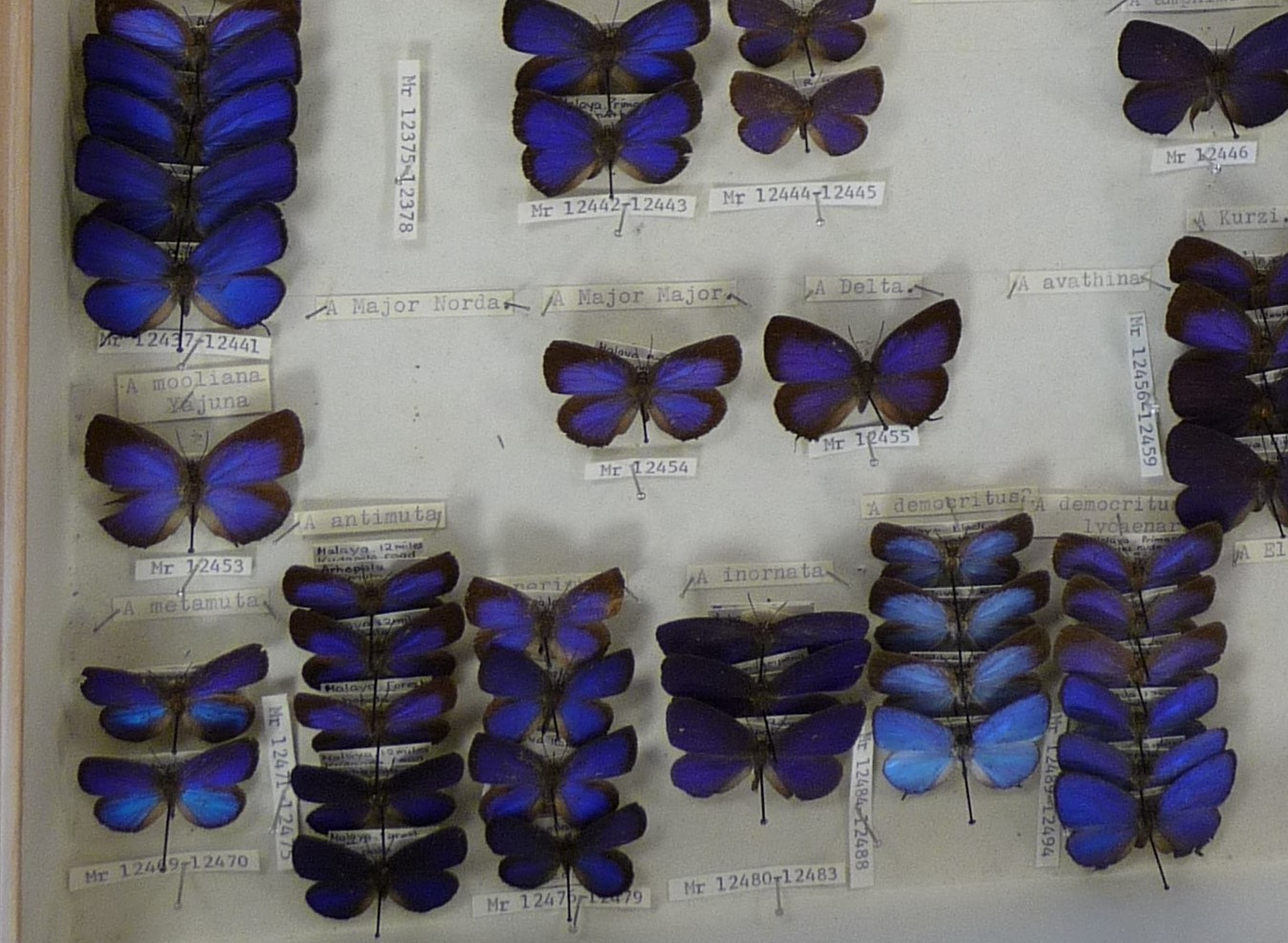
Arhopala metamuta and other Arhopala Wilcocks collection

== Description ==
Dark blue purple forewings and much lighter lustrous azure hindwings. This species is recognisable at once by the different blue of the two wings, The genitalia are specialised, with very strong short scimitar-shaped hooks; the clasps have bilobed extremities, the outer lobe having a somewhat pointed tongue-shaped tip, and the inner lobe being spatulate, the incision being marked and moderately deep; the penis is of medium size, with a globose orifice.

== Subspecies ==
- A. m. metamuta Peninsular Malaya, Sumatra
- A. m. hilda (Evans, 1957) Borneo
