= List of butterflies of the Solomon Islands =

Location of the Solomon Islands

This is a list of butterflies of the Solomon Islands archipelago.

== Hesperiidae ==
=== Pyrginae ===
- Tagiades japetus hovia (Swinhoe, 1904)
- Tagiades japetus kazana Evans, 1934
- Tagiades japetus banika Tennent, 2004
- Tagiades japetus suumoli Tennent, 2001
- Tagiades trebellius vella (Evans, 1934)
- Tagiades trebellius lola Evans, 1949

=== Coeliadinae ===
- Badamia exclamationis (Fabricius, 1775)
- Allora doleschallii solon Evans, 1949
- Allora doleschallii luna (Evans, 1934)
- Allora doleschallii cristobalensis Tennent, 2001
- Hasora chromus bilunata (Butler, 1883)
- Hasora hurama kieta (Strand, 1921)
- Hasora hurama diana Evans, 1959
- Hasora celaenus (Stoll, 1782)

=== Hesperiinae ===
- Cephrenes augiades tugela Evans, 1949
- Cephrenes shortlandica (Swinhoe, 1915)
- Telicota solva (Evans, 1949)
- Suniana sunias isabella Evans, 1934
- Borbo impar tetragraphus (Mabille, 1891)
- Borbo cinnara (Wallace & Moore, 1866)
- Pelopidas agna agnata Evans, 1937
- Pelopidas lyelli lyelli (Rothschild, 1915)
- Caltoris philippina subfenestrata (Röber, 1891)

== Papilionidae ==
=== Papilioninae ===
- Pachliopta polydorus polypemon (Mathew, 1887)
- Pachliopta polydorus polydaemon (Mathew, 1887)
- Ornithoptera priamus urvillianus (Guérin-Méneville, 1838)
- Ornithoptera victoriae regis (Rothschild, 1895)
- Ornithoptera victoriae rubianus (Rothschild, 1904)
- Ornithoptera victoriae isabellae (Rothschild & Jordan, 1901)
- Ornithoptera victoriae victoriae (Gray, 1856)
- Ornithoptera victoriae reginae Salvin, 1888
- Ornithoptera victoriae epiphanes (Schmid, 1970)
- Graphium agamemnon salomonis Rothschild, 1895
- Graphium agamemnon ugiensis (Jordan, 1909)
- Graphium meeki meeki (Rothschild & Jordan, 1901)
- Graphium mendana acous (Ribbe, 1898)
- Graphium mendana neyra (Rothschild, 1895)
- Graphium mendana mendana (Godman & Salvin, 1888)
- Graphium mendana aureofasciatum Racheli, 1979
- Graphium hicetaon (Mathew, 1886)
- Graphium codrus gabriellae Racheli, 1979
- Graphium codrus tenebrionis (Rothschild, 1895)
- Graphium codrus pisidice (Godman & Salvin, 1888)
- Graphium codrus christobalus (Jordan, 1909)
- Graphium sarpedon isander (Godman & Salvin, 1888)
- Graphium sarpedon impar (Rothschild, 1895)
- Chilasa toboroi straatmani (Racheli, 1979)
- Papilio aegeus oberon (Grose Smith, 1897)
- Papilio woodfordi woodfordi Godman & Salvin, 1888
- Papilio woodfordi choiseuli Rothschild, 1908
- Papilio woodfordi ariel (Grose Smith, 1889)
- Papilio woodfordi laarchus (Godman & Salvin, 1888)
- Papilio woodfordi ptolychus (Godman & Salvin, 1888)
- Papilio woodfordi mome Tennent, 1999
- Papilio woodfordi gimblei Tennent, 1999
- Papilio bridgei bridgei Mathew, 1886
- Papilio bridgei prospero (Grose Smith, 1889)
- Papilio bridgei hecataeus (Godman & Salvin, 1888)
- Papilio bridgei michae Racheli, 1984
- Papilio erskinei Mathew, 1886
- Papilio phestus minusculus (Ribbe, 1898)
- Papilio fuscus hasterti (Ribbe, 1907)
- Papilio fuscus relmae Tennent, 1999
- Papilio fuscus gyrei Tennent, 1999
- Papilio fuscus xenophilus (Mathew, 1886)
- Papilio ulysses orsippus (Godman & Salvin, 1888)
- Papilio ulysses georgius Rothschild, 1908

== Pieridae ==
=== Coliadinae ===
- Catopsilia pomona (Fabricius, 1775)
- Catopsilia scylla etesia (Hewitson, 1867)
- Eurema hecabe nivaria (Fruhstorfer, 1910)
- Eurema blanda saraha (Fruhstorfer, 1912)
- Eurema candida salomonis (Butler, 1898)
- Eurema candida yatai Tennent, 2004
- Eurema candida woodfordi (Butler, 1898)

=== Pierinae ===
- Elodina argypheus Grose Smith, 1890
- Elodina umbratica Grose Smith, 1889
- Saletara cycinna corinna (Wallace, 1867)
- Appias ada florentia Grose Smith, 1896
- Cepora perimale agnata (Grose Smith, 1889)
- Cepora perimale discolor (Mathew, 1887)
- Cepora perimale radiata Howarth, 1962
- Belenois java peristhene (Boisduval, 1859)
- Delias alberti alberti Rothschild, 1904
- Delias alberti tetamba Arora, 1983
- Delias schoenbergi choiseuli Rothschild, 1904
- Delias schoenbergi isabellae Rothschild & Jordan, 1901
- Delias lytaea georgiana Grose Smith, 1895
- Delias messalina orientalis Arora, 1983

== Lycaenidae ==
=== Curetinae ===
- Curetis barsine solita (Butler, 1882)

=== Miletinae ===
- Liphyra brassolis bougainvilleanus Samson & Smart, 1980
- Liphyra brassolis salomonis Samson & Smart, 1980

=== Theclinae ===
- Hypochrysops architas architas Druce, 1891
- Hypochrysops architas marie Tennent, 2001
- Hypochrysops architas cratevas (Druce, 1891)
- Hypochrysops architas seuthes (Druce, 1891)
- Hypochrysops scintillans constancea D'Abrera, 1971
- Hypochrysops scintillans jamesi Tennent, 2001
- Hypochrysops taeniata Jordan, 1908
- Hypochrysops julie Tennent, 2001
- Hypochrysops alyattes alyattes Druce, 1891
- Arhopala eurisus eurisus Druce, 1891
- Arhopala eurisus tovesi Tennent, 1999
- Arhopala florinda ( Grose-Smith, 1896)
- Arhopala mimsyi Tennent, 1999
- Arhopala tindali (Ribbe, 1899)
- Arhopala sophrosyne (Grose Smith, 1889)
- Arhopala thamyras phryxus (Boisduval, 1832)
- Amblypodia annetta faisina (Ribbe, 1899)
- Amblypodia annetta russellensis Tennent, 2000
- Hypolycaena alcestis (Grose Smith, 1889)
- Deudorix woodfordi woodfordi Druce, 1891
- Deudorix confusa Tennent, 2000
- Deudorix viridens Druce, 1891
- Deudorix brilligi Tennent, 2000
- Deudorix diovis Hewitson, 1863
- Deudorix mathewi mathewi Druce, 1892
- Deudorix eagon Tennent, 2000
- Deudorix wabens Tennent, 2000
- Bindahara phocides chromis (Mathew, 1887)

=== Polyommatinae ===
- Anthene paraffinis paraffinis (Fruhstorfer, 1916)
- Anthene paraffinis nereia Tite, 1966
- Anthene paraffinis cristobalus Tennent, 2001
- Petrelaea tombugensis (Röber, 1886)
- Nacaduba pactolus bilikii Tennent, 2000
- Nacaduba pactolus georgia Tennent, 2000
- Nacaduba berenice korene (Druce, 1891)
- Nacaduba novaehebridensis guizoensis Tite, 1963
- Nacaduba novaehebridensis medius Tennent, 2000
- Nacaduba novaehebridensis novaehebridensis Druce, 1892
- Nacaduba dyopa lepidus (Tennent, 2000)
- Nacaduba kurava euretes (Druce, 1891)
- Nacaduba kurava cruzens Tennent, 2000
- Nacaduba factio Tennent, 2000
- Nacaduba cyanea chromia (Druce, 1891)
- Nacaduba mallicollo markira Tite, 1963
- Nacaduba samsoni Tennent, 2001
- Tartesa astarte astarte (Butler, 1882)
- Tartesa astarte plumbata (Druce, 1891)
- Tartesa astarte narovona (Grose Smith, 1898)
- Tartesa ugiensis (Druce, 1891)
- Solomona sutakiki sutakiki Tennent, 2000
- Solomona sutakiki malaitae Tennent, 2000
- Erysichton lineata vincula (Druce, 1891)
- Erysichton lineata imperialis Tennent, 2000
- Erysichton lineata biskira Tennent, 2000
- Erysichton palmyra lateplaga Tite, 1963
- Erysichton palmyra hauta Tennent, 2000
- Psychonotis kruera (Druce, 1891)
- Psychonotis slithyi slithyi Tennent, 1999
- Psychonotis slithyi borogrovesi Tennent, 1999
- Psychonotis waihuru Tennent, 1999
- Psychonotis eleanor Tennent, 1999
- Psychonotis julie Tennent, 1999
- Prosotas nora caliginosa (Druce, 1891)
- Prosotas russelli Tennent, 2003
- Prosotas talesia Tite, 1963
- Prosotas dubiosa eborata Tite, 1963
- Prosotas dubiosa livida Tennent, 2000
- Nothodanis schaeffera cepheis (Druce, 1891)
- Catopyrops ancyra amaura (Druce, 1891)
- Catopyrops ancyra ligamenta (Druce, 1891)
- Catopyrops ancyra maniana (Druce, 1891)
- Catopyrops keiria keiria (Druce, 1891)
- Catopyrops keiria reducta Howarth, 1962
- Catopyrops keiria makira Tennent, 2000
- Catopyrops nebulosa nebulosa (Druce, 1892)
- Ionolyce helicon caracalla (Waterhouse & Lyell, 1914)
- Ionolyce lachlani Tennent, 2001
- Ionolyce brunnescens brunnescens Tite, 1963
- Ionolyce brunnescens cristobalus Tennent, 2000
- Ionolyce selkon Parsons, 1986
- Jamides soemias soemias Druce, 1891
- Jamides cephion Druce, 1891
- Jamides amarauge amarauge Druce, 1891
- Jamides amarauge hepworthi Tennent, 2001
- Jamides goodenovii (Butler, 1876)
- Jamides morphoides Butler, 1884
- Jamides areas (Druce, 1891)
- Jamides celeno sundara (Fruhstorfer, 1915)
- Jamides celeno evanescens (Butler, 1875)
- Jamides aetherialis caerulina (Mathew, 1887)
- Epimastidia arienis arienis Druce, 1891
- Epimastidia arienis taisia Tennent, 2001
- Epimastidia arienis outgrabe Tennent, 2001
- Catochrysops strabo celebensis Tite, 1959
- Catochrysops amasea amasea Waterhouse & Lyell, 1914
- Catochrysops amasea reducta Howarth, 1962
- Catochrysops panormus pura Tite, 1959
- Catochrysops panormus rennellensis Howarth, 1962
- Catochrysops taitensis taitensis (Boisduval, 1832)
- Catochrysops nubila Tite, 1959
- Lampides boeticus (Linnaeus, 1767)
- Famegana alsulus alsulus (Herrich-Schaeffer, 1869)
- Pithecops dionisius dionisius (Boisduval, 1832)
- Pithecops steirema Druce, 1890
- Leptotes plinius pseudocassius (Murray, 1873)
- Zizina labradus lampra (Tite, 1969)
- Zizula hylax dampierensis (Rothschild, 1915)
- Everes lacturnus palliensis (Ribbe, 1899)
- Megisba strongyle monacha (Grose Smith, 1894)
- Udara cardia cardia (C Felder, 1860)
- Euchrysops cnejus cnidus Waterhouse and Lyell, 1914
- Luthrodes cleotas gades (Fruhstorfer, 1915)

== Nymphalidae ==
=== Libytheinae ===
- Libythea geoffroy orientalis (Godman & Salvin, 1888)
- Libythea geoffroy howarthi Peterson, 1968
- Libythea geoffroy eborinus Samson, 1980

=== Danainae ===
- Tellervo hiero hiero (Godman & Salvin, 1888)
- Tellervo hiero evages (Godman & Salvin, 1888)
- Parantica schenkii schenkii (Koch, 1865)
- Parantica garamantis garamantis (Godman & Salvin, 1888)
- Ideopsis juventa sobrinoides (Butler, 1882)
- Tirumala euploeomorpha (Howarth, Kawazoé & Sibatani, 1976)
- Tirumala hamata obscurata (Butler, 1874)
- Tirumala hamata insignis (Talbot, 1943)
- Tirumala hamata richardi Tennent, 2001
- Tirumala hamata moderata (Butler, 1875)
- Danaus affinis decipiens (Butler, 1882)
- Danaus affinis monoensis Tennent, 2001
- Danaus affinis albonotata (Howarth, 1962)
- Danaus affinis cometho (Godman & Salvin, 1888)
- Danaus affinis insolata (Butler, 1870)
- Danaus affinis ulawaensis Tennent, 2001
- Danaus affinis mendana Tennent, 2001
- Danaus petilia (Stoll, 1790)
- Danaus plexippus plexippus (Linnaeus, 1758)
- Tiradelphe schneideri Ackery & Vane-Wright, 1984
- Euploea sylvester melander (Grose Smith, 1897)
- Euploea phaenareta heurippa (Godman & Salvin, 1888)
- Euploea leucostictos polymela (Godman & Salvin, 1888)
- Euploea leucostictos imitata (Butler, 1870)
- Euploea leucostictos bellona (Howarth, 1962)
- Euploea leucostictos rossi (Carpenter, 1953)
- Euploea leucostictos crucis (Carpenter, 1953)
- Euploea leucostictos iphianassa (Butler, 1866)
- Euploea leucostictos eustachiella (Carpenter, 1953)
- Euploea asyllus asyllus Godman & Salvin, 1888
- Euploea asyllus gerion (Godman & Salvin, 1888)
- Euploea tulliolus mangolinella (Strand, 1914)
- Euploea tulliolus pyres (Godman & Salvin, 1888)
- Euploea boisduvalii fraudulenta (Butler, 1882)
- Euploea boisduvalii addenda (Howarth, 1962)
- Euploea boisduvalii pyrgion (Godman & Salvin, 1888)
- Euploea boisduvalii brenchleyi (Butler, 1870)
- Euploea boisduvalii lapeyrousei Boisduval, 1832
- Euploea algea rennellensis (Carpenter, 1953)
- Euploea lewinii lilybaea (Fruhstorfer, 1911)
- Euploea treitschkei aenea (Butler, 1882)
- Euploea treitschkei lorenzo (Butler, 1870)
- Euploea treitschkei jessica (Butler, 1869)
- Euploea batesii honesta (Butler, 1882)
- Euploea batesii kunggana Carpenter, 1953
- Euploea batesii woodfordi (Godman & Salvin, 1888)
- Euploea batesii ackeryi Tennent, 2001
- Euploea batesii leucacron Carpenter, 1953
- Euploea nechos nechos Mathew, 1887
- Euploea nechos pronax (Godman & Salvin, 1888)
- Euploea nechos prusias (Godman & Salvin, 1888)

== Nymphalidae ==
=== Morphinae ===
- Taenaris phorcas phorcas (Westwood, 1856)

=== Satyrinae ===
- Mycalesis perseus lalassis (Hewitson, 1864)
- Mycalesis splendens splendens Mathew, 1887
- Mycalesis splendens versicolor Tennent, 2002
- Mycalesis splendens guadalcanalensis Tennent, 2002
- Mycalesis splendens malaitensis Uémura, 2000
- Mycalesis splendens tenebrosus Tennent, 2002
- Mycalesis splendens magnificans Tennent, 2002
- Mycalesis interrupta interrupta Grose Smith, 1889
- Mycalesis interrupta woodsi Tennent, 2002
- Mycalesis biliki Tennent, 2002
- Mycalesis richardi Tennent, 2002
- Mycalesis sara Mathew, 1887
- Orsotriaena medus licium Fruhstorfer, 1908
- Melanitis leda salomonis Fruhstorfer, 1908
- Melanitis leda solandra (Fabricius, 1775)
- Melanitis amabilis amabilis (Boisduval, 1832)
- Melanitis constantia despoliata Fruhstorfer, 1908
- Argyronympha pulchra Mathew, 1886
- Argyronympha rubianensis rubianensis Grose Smith, 1889
- Argyronympha rubianensis vella (Fruhstorfer, 1911)
- Argyronympha gracilipes Jordan, 1924
- Argyronympha danker Tennent, 2001
- Argyronympha ulava Grose Smith, 1889
- Argyronympha ugiensis Mathew, 1886
- Polyura epigenes monochromus (Niepelt, 1914)
- Polyura epigenes epigenes (Godman & Salvin, 1888)
- Polyura bicolor (Turlin & Sato, 1995)
- Polyura jupiter attila (Grose Smith, 1889)
- Prothoe ribbei Rothschild, 1895

=== Apaturinae ===
- Cyrestis acilia nitida (Mathew, 1887)
- Cyrestis acilia russellensis Tennent, 2001
- Cyrestis acilia solomonis (Mathew, 1887)
- Cyrestis acilia ulawana (Martin, 1903)
- Cyrestis telamon bougainvillei (Ribbe, 1898)

=== Limenitidinae ===
- Parthenos sylvia thesaurus (Mathew, 1887)
- Parthenos sylvia ugiensis Fruhstorfer, 1913
- Parthenos sylvia thesaurinus Grose Smith, 1897
- Phaedyma fissizonata olega Tennent, 2001
- Phaedyma fissizonata vella Eliot, 1969
- Phaedyma fissizonata fissizonata (Butler, 1882)
- Phaedyma fissizonata philipi Tennent, 2001
- Phaedyma viridens (Eliot, 1969)

=== Nymphalinae ===
- Mynes woodfordi woodfordi Godman & Salvin, 1888
- Mynes woodfordi isabella Fruhstorfer, 1906
- Mynes woodfordi hercyna (Godman & Salvin, 1888)
- Mynes woodfordi shannoni Tennent, 2001
- Doleschallia tongana menexema (Fruhstorfer, 1912)
- Doleschallia tongana rennellensis (Howarth, 1962)
- Doleschallia browni sciron (Godman & Salvin, 1888)
- Doleschallia browni herrichii (Butler 1875)
- Doleschallia rickardi Grose Smith, 1890
- Hypolimnas antilope shortlandica (Ribbe, 1898)
- Hypolimnas exiguus Samson, 1980
- Hypolimnas pithoeka pithoeka Kirsch, 1877
- Hypolimnas pithoeka scopas (Godman & Salvin, 1888)
- Hypolimnas pithoeka bradleyi Howarth, 1962
- Hypolimnas pithoeka ferruginea Howarth, 1962
- Hypolimnas pithoeka leveri Tennent, 2001
- Hypolimnas alimena diphridas Fruhstorfer, 1912
- Hypolimnas alimena diffusa Howarth, 1962
- Hypolimnas alimena libateia Howarth, 1962
- Hypolimnas alimena fuliginescens (Mathew, 1887)
- Hypolimnas alimena catalai Viette, 1950
- Hypolimnas bolina nerina (Fabricius, 1775)
- Hypolimnas misippus (Linnaeus, 1764)
- Yoma algina pavonia (Mathew, 1887)
- Junonia villida villida (Fabricius, 1787)
- Junonia hedonia zelima (Fabricius, 1775)

=== Heliconiinae ===
- Vindula arsinoe sapor (Godman & Salvin, 1888)
- Vindula arsinoe albosignata (Talbot, 1932)
- Vindula arsinoe intermedia Tennent, 2001
- Vindula arsinoe catenes (Godman & Salvin, 1888)
- Vindula arsinoe clodia (Godman & Salvin, 1888)
- Vagrans egista shortlandica (Fruhstorfer, 1912)
- Vagrans egista propinqua (Miskin, 1884)
- Vagrans egista hebridina (Waterhouse, 1920)
- Phalanta alcippe ephyra (Godman & Salvin, 1888)
- Phalanta alcippe bellona Howarth, 1962
- Phalanta alcippe rennellensis Howarth, 1962
- Cupha melichrysos tredecia (Mathew, 1887)
- Cupha melichrysos melichrysos (Mathew, 1887)
- Cupha aureus Samson, 1980
- Algiachroa woodfordi woodfordi (Godman & Salvin, 1888)
- Algiachroa woodfordi malaitae Tennent, 2001

=== Acraeinae ===
- Acraea moluccana fumigata (Honrath, 1886)
