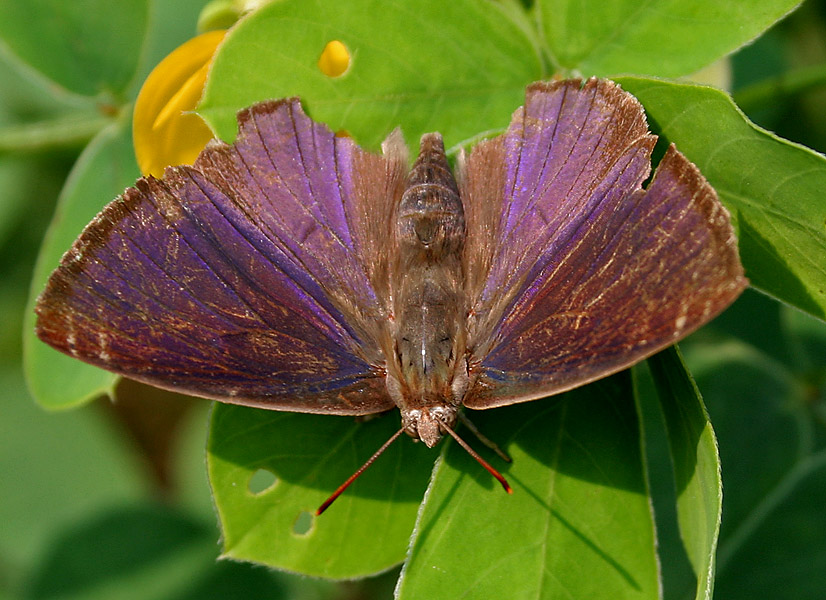

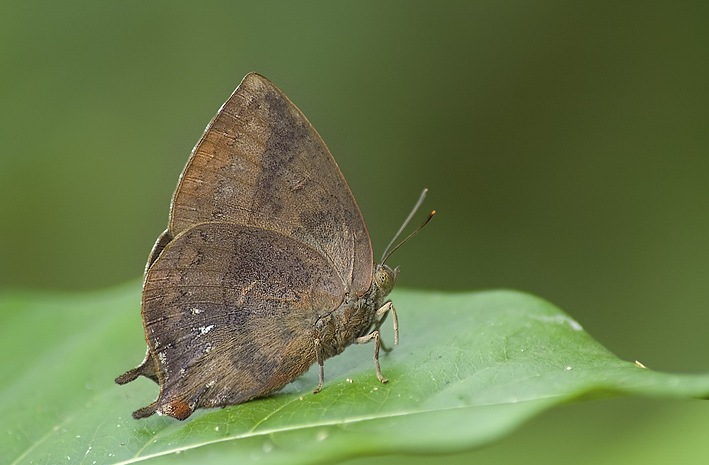

Scientific classification
- Kingdom: Animalia
- Phylum: Arthropoda
- Class: Insecta
- Order: Lepidoptera
- Family: Lycaenidae
- Genus: Amblypodia
- Species: A. anita

Binomial name
- Amblypodia anita Hewitson, 1862

Synonyms
- Horsfieldia anita

= Amblypodia anita =

Purple leaf blue

Species of butterfly

Amblypodia anita, the purple leaf blue or leaf blue, is a lycaenid or blue butterfly found in South Asia and Southeast Asia, including Sri Lanka, India, Myanmar, Malaysia, and Java. The species was first described by William Chapman Hewitson in 1862.

== Description ==
Male. Upperside dark violet-purple with very little gloss, the colour obscuring the marginal black borders. Forewing, costa and outer margin with a moderately broad blackish band, generally broadest on the latter. Hindwing with the costal band broad, the outer marginal band narrow, in most specimens a mere line; anal lobe marked with dull red. Cilia black, tail stout, with a black cilia. Underside rufous-brown. Forewing with a black line from the costa near the apex to the hinder margin beyond the middle, followed by a post-discal series of indistinct disconnected lunular black marks, not always visible, and sometimes indications of a sub-marginal series. Hindwing with a medial outwardly curved black line and an indistinct outwardly curved discal series of black dots marked with white points, both in continuation of the two lines of the forewing, and a series of sub-marginal similar black dots, the ground colour of the wing varying in tone in different examples. Female. Upperside very dull violet, sometimes almost violet-brown. Forewing with broad costal and outer marginal blackish-brown borders. Hindwing generally uniform dull violet-brown, without any borders, anal lobe as in the male. Underside varying in shade of colour from ochreous-grey to violet-brown, markings as in the male, but some of the darker-coloured examples have a band of suffused whitish marks in connection with the discal line. Antennae black, with an orange tip; head and body above and below concolorous with the wings.

— Charles Swinhoe, Lepidoptera Indica. Vol. VIII

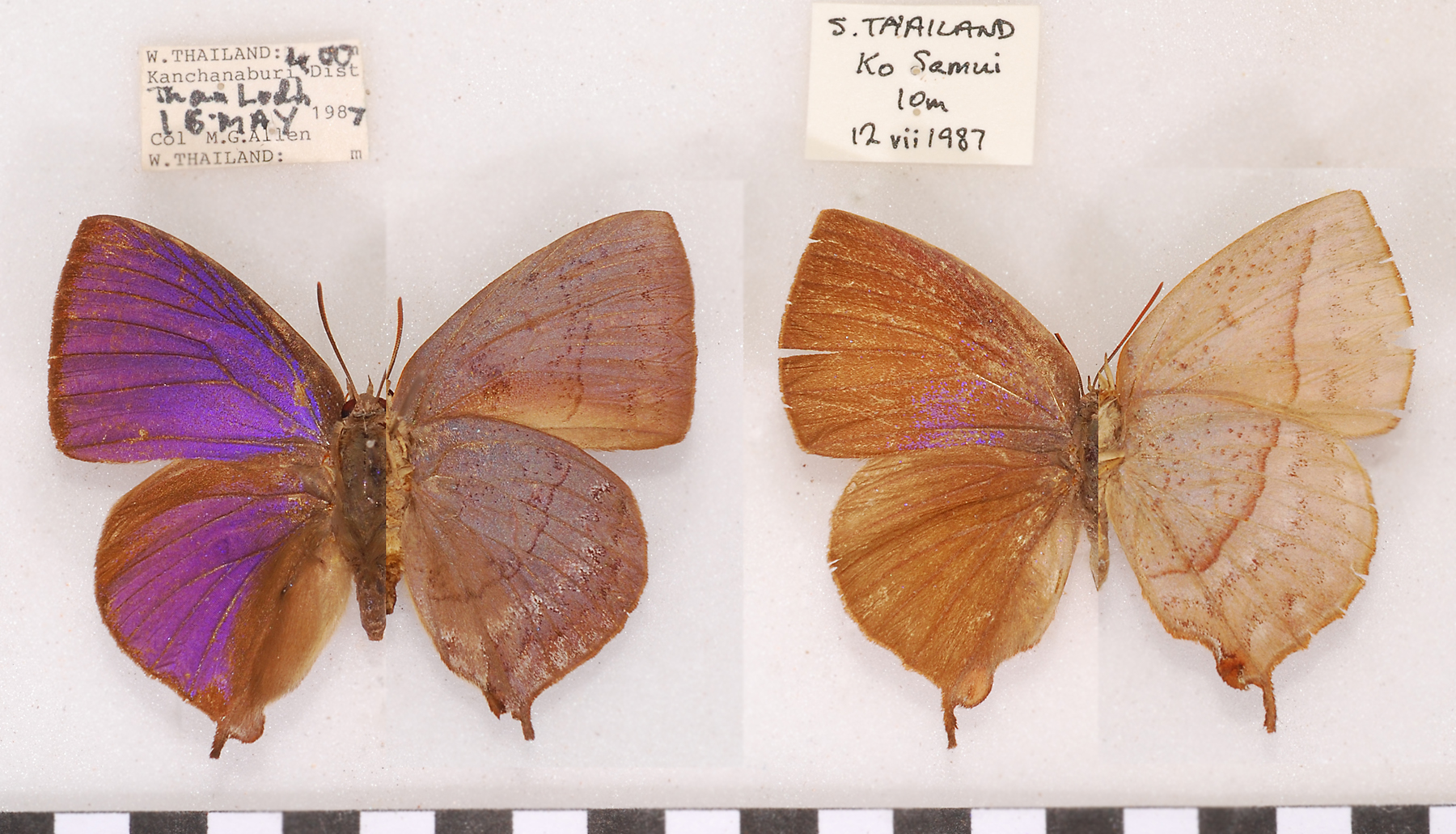
