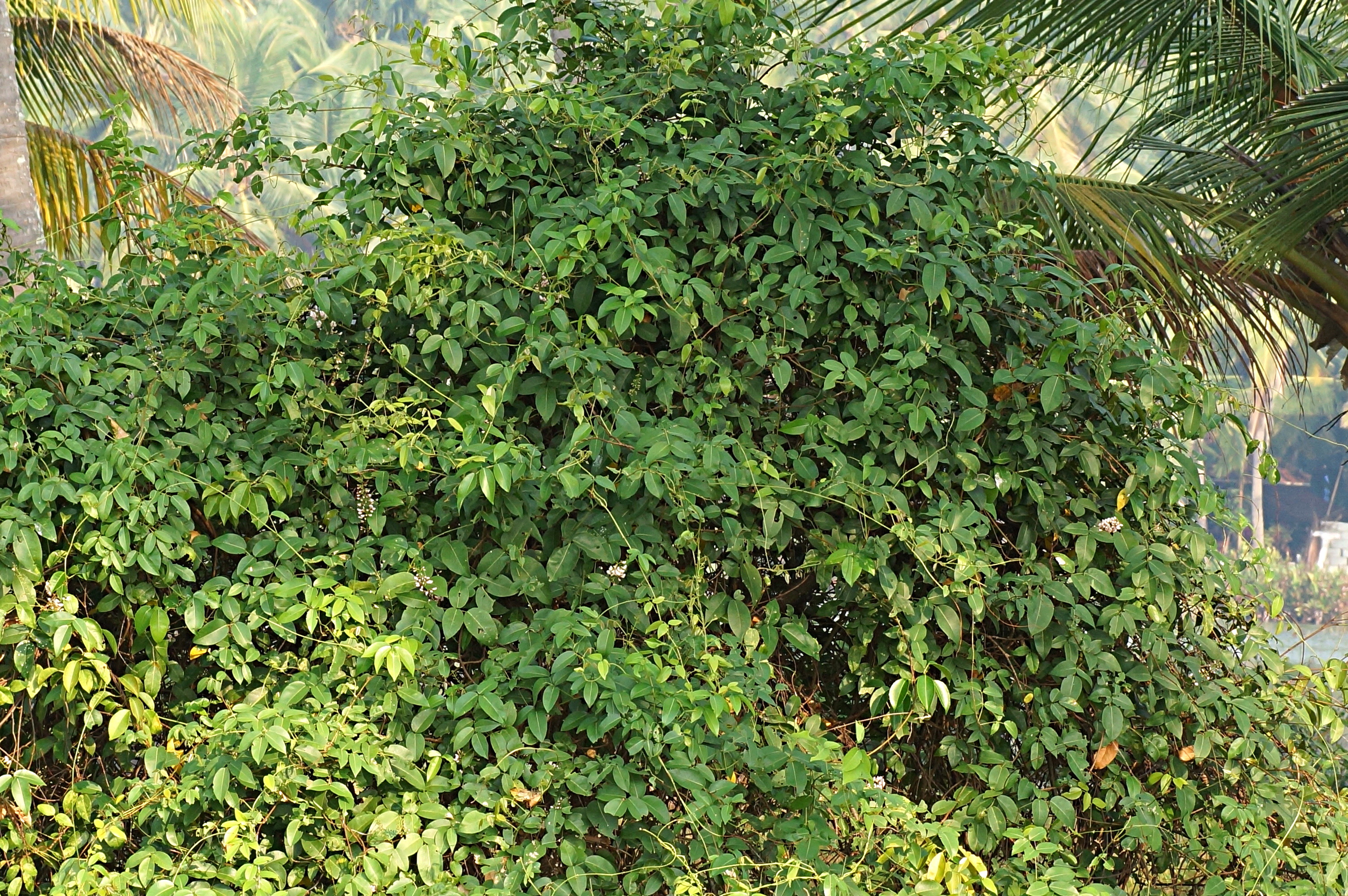

Scientific classification
- Kingdom: Plantae
- Clade: Tracheophytes
- Clade: Angiosperms
- Clade: Eudicots
- Clade: Rosids
- Order: Fabales
- Family: Fabaceae
- Subfamily: Faboideae
- Genus: Derris
- Species: D. trifoliata

Binomial name
- Derris trifoliata Lour.

Synonyms
- List: Deguelia trifoliata (Lour.) Taub.; Derris uliginosa var. loureiroi Benth.; Pterocarpus trifoliatus (Lour.) Kuntze; Brachypterum floribundum Miq.; Dalbergia acuminata Hassk.; Dalbergia heterophylla Willd.; Dalbergia radicans Zipp. ex Miq.; Dalbergia repens Span.; Deguelia floribunda (Miq.) Taub.; Deguelia multiflora (Benth.) Taub.; Deguelia uliginosa (Willd.) Baill.; Derris affinis Benth.; Derris floribunda (Miq.) Benth.; Derris forsteniana Blume ex Miq.; Derris heterophylla (Willd.) Backer ex K.Heyne; Derris multiflora Benth.; Derris trifoliata var. macrocarpa Domin; Derris uliginosa (Willd.) Benth.; Galedupa uliginosa (Willd.) Roxb.; Pongamia lucida Graham; Pongamia madagascariensis Bojer ex Baker; Pongamia maritima Wight ex Wall.; Pongamia piscatoria Seem.; Pongamia religiosa Wight; Pongamia triphylla Wight; Pongamia uliginosa (Willd.) DC.; Pterocarpus floribundus (Miq.) Kuntze; Pterocarpus forstenianus (Blume ex Miq.) Kuntze; Pterocarpus frutescens Blanco; Pterocarpus multiflorus (Benth.) Kuntze; Pterocarpus uliginosus (Willd.) Roxb. ex G.Don; Robinia uliginosa Willd.; Sweetia uliginosa (Willd.) G.Don; Tephrosia uliginosa (Willd.) Spreng.

= Derris trifoliata =

Species of legume

Derris trifoliata is a species of flowering plant in the family Fabaceae.

It is common in India; in various Indian languages, it is known as Angaar valli in Sanskrit; Karanjvel in Marathi; Firta in Konkani; Tigekranugu, Nauatige, and Chirathelathige in Telugu; Ketia and Swanlata in Oria; Kammattivalli and Ponumvalli in Malayalam; Kaliya lata/Kalilata and Panlata in Bengali; Panlata also in Hindi.

It is also common in various parts of South East Asia; common names include Asiasimanan in Filipino Tagalog; Tuwa areuy in Indonesian Sundanese; Akar Ketuil, Ketui, Setui, Salang, Tuba bekut or Sea Tuba in Peninsular Malaysian; Phak thaep in central Thai; Cc Kn Nc/Cosc Kesn Nuwowsc in Vietnamese, etc.

It is a large climber found commonly in coastal swamps of tropical coastal areas in South-East Asia. It is 3–5 meters long. Its leaves are alternate, pinnate, 12–20 cm; leaflets 5 and ovate, 6-10 cm, acuminate, rounded at base. Flowers are 1 cm in size, in axillary racemes 8–15 cm. Pods are 3–4 cm, flat, pale yellow in color.

The rotenoid 6aα,12aα-12a-hydroxyelliptone can be found in the stems of D. trifoliata. In 1902 Kazuo Nagai, Japanese chemical engineer of the Government-General of Taiwan, isolated a pure crystalline compound from a closely related plant possibly Derris elliptica which he called rotenone, after the Taiwanese name of the plant 蘆藤 (Min Nan Chinese: lôo-tîn) translated into Japanese rōten (ローテン).

The pod, root, and stem of the Derris trifoliata are rich in poisonous rotenoids and used commonly in insecticide, piscicide and pesticide activities and also have sometimes caused human morbidity or mortality due to suicide attempts or accidental ingestion.

The larvae of Hasora hurama feed on D. trifoliata.

== Gallery ==
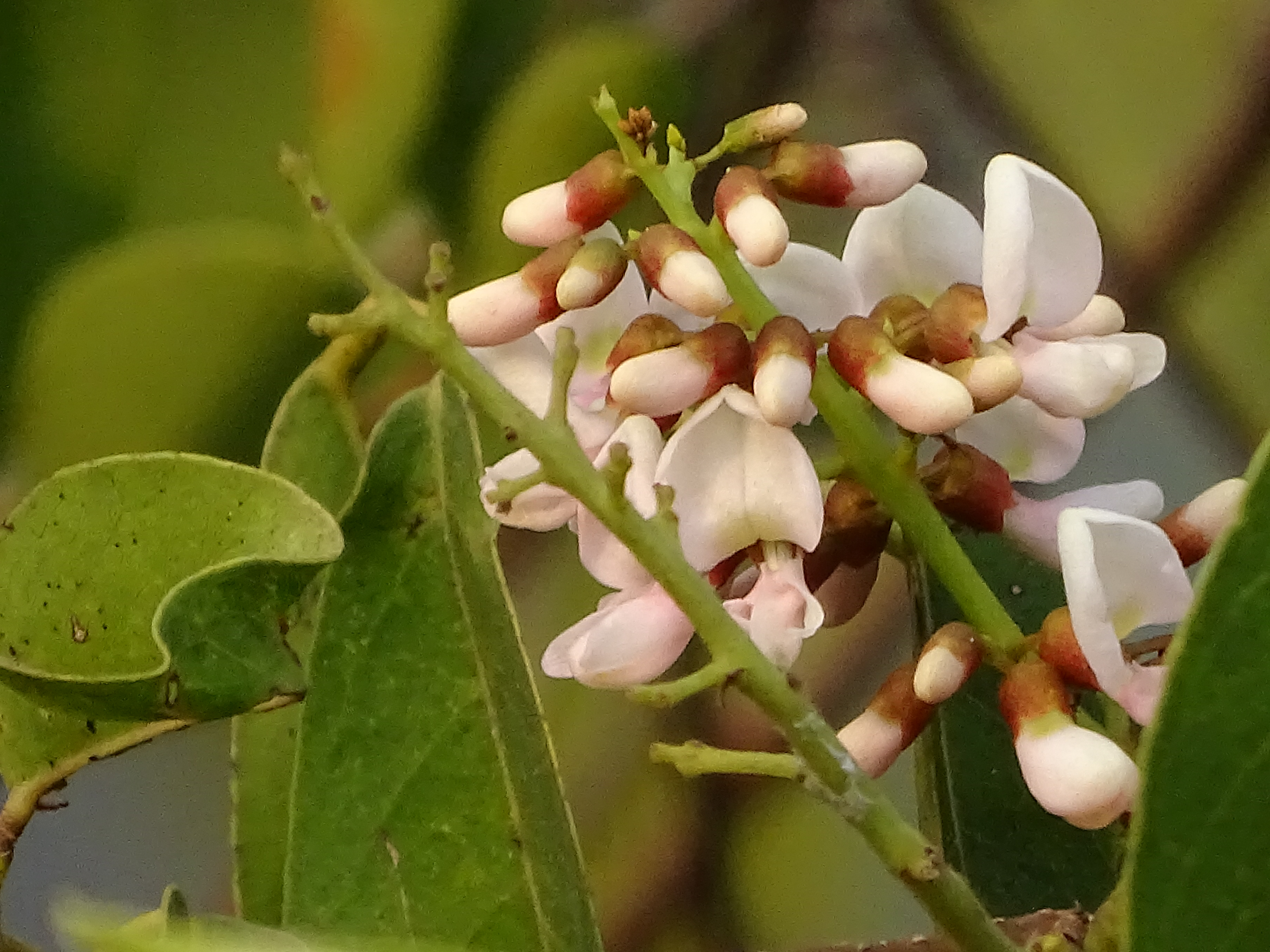

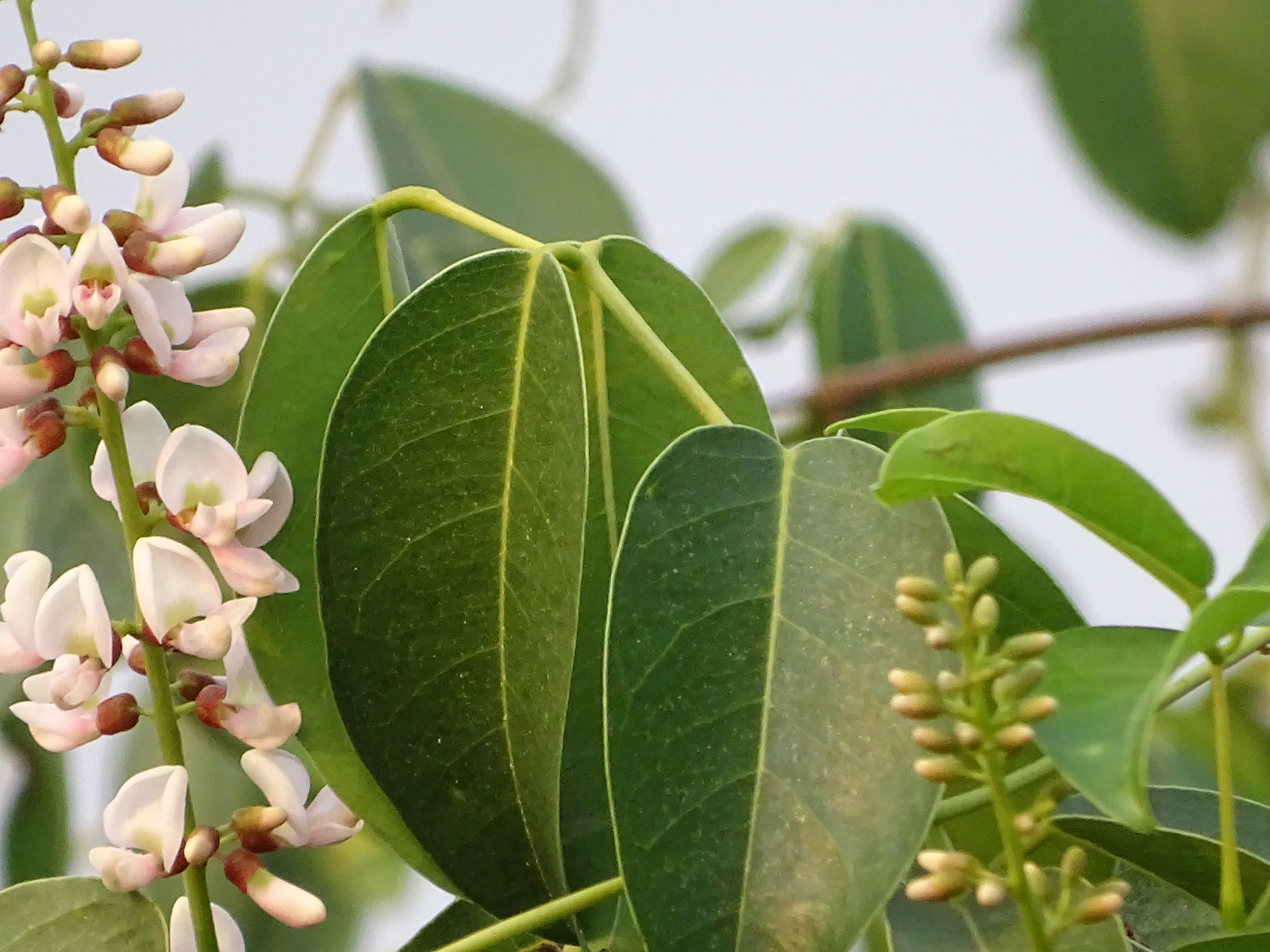

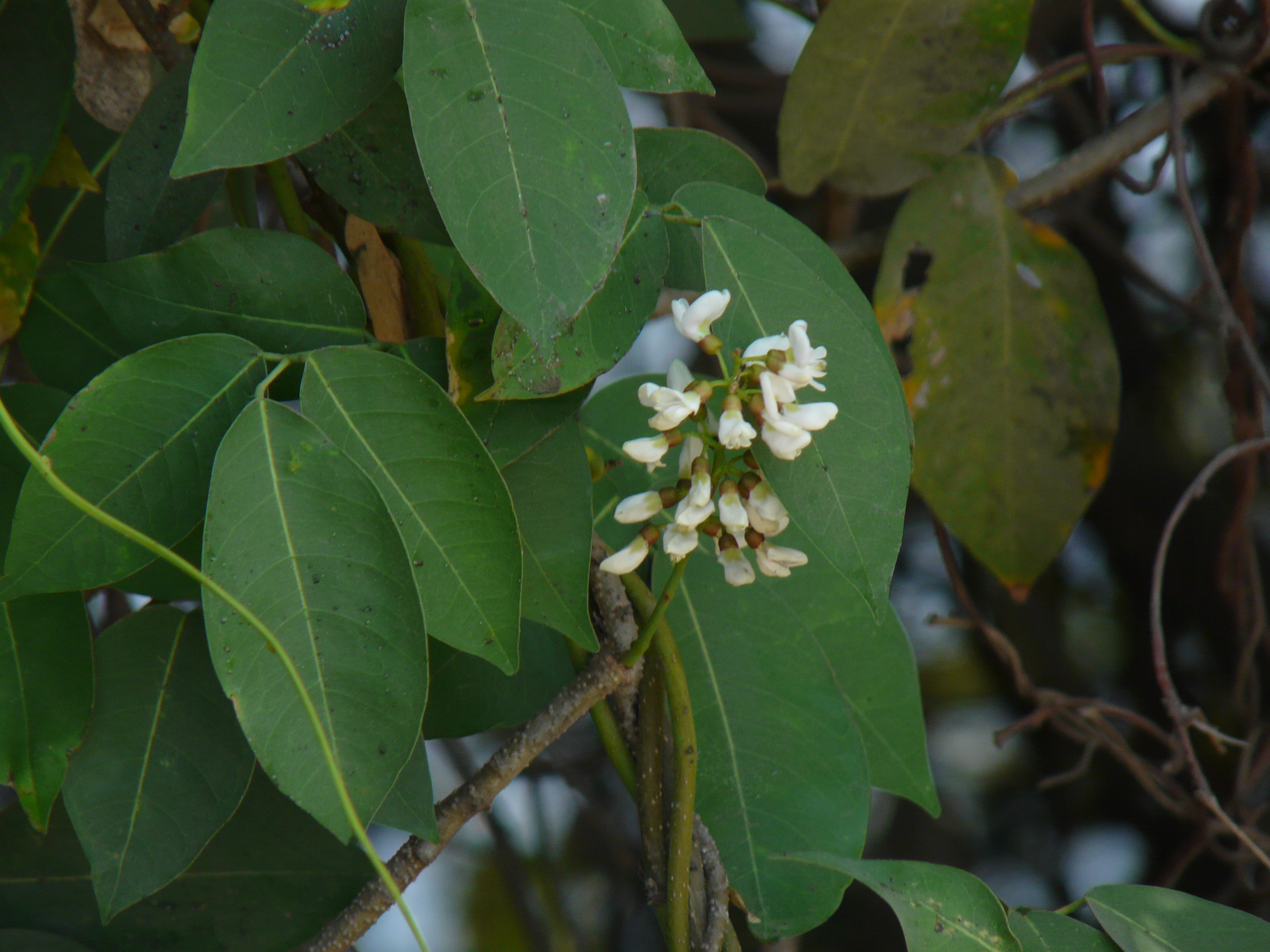

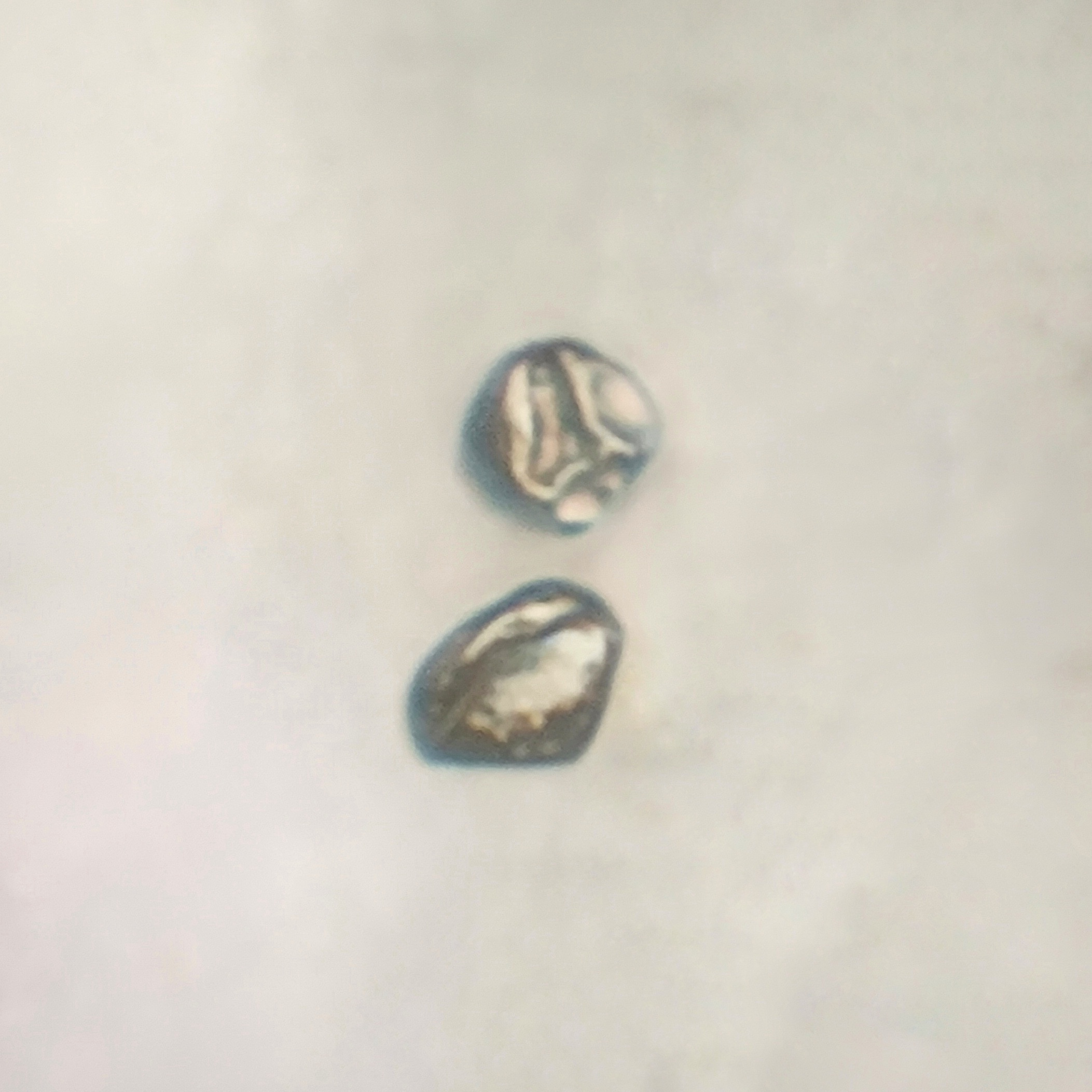
Pollen grains
