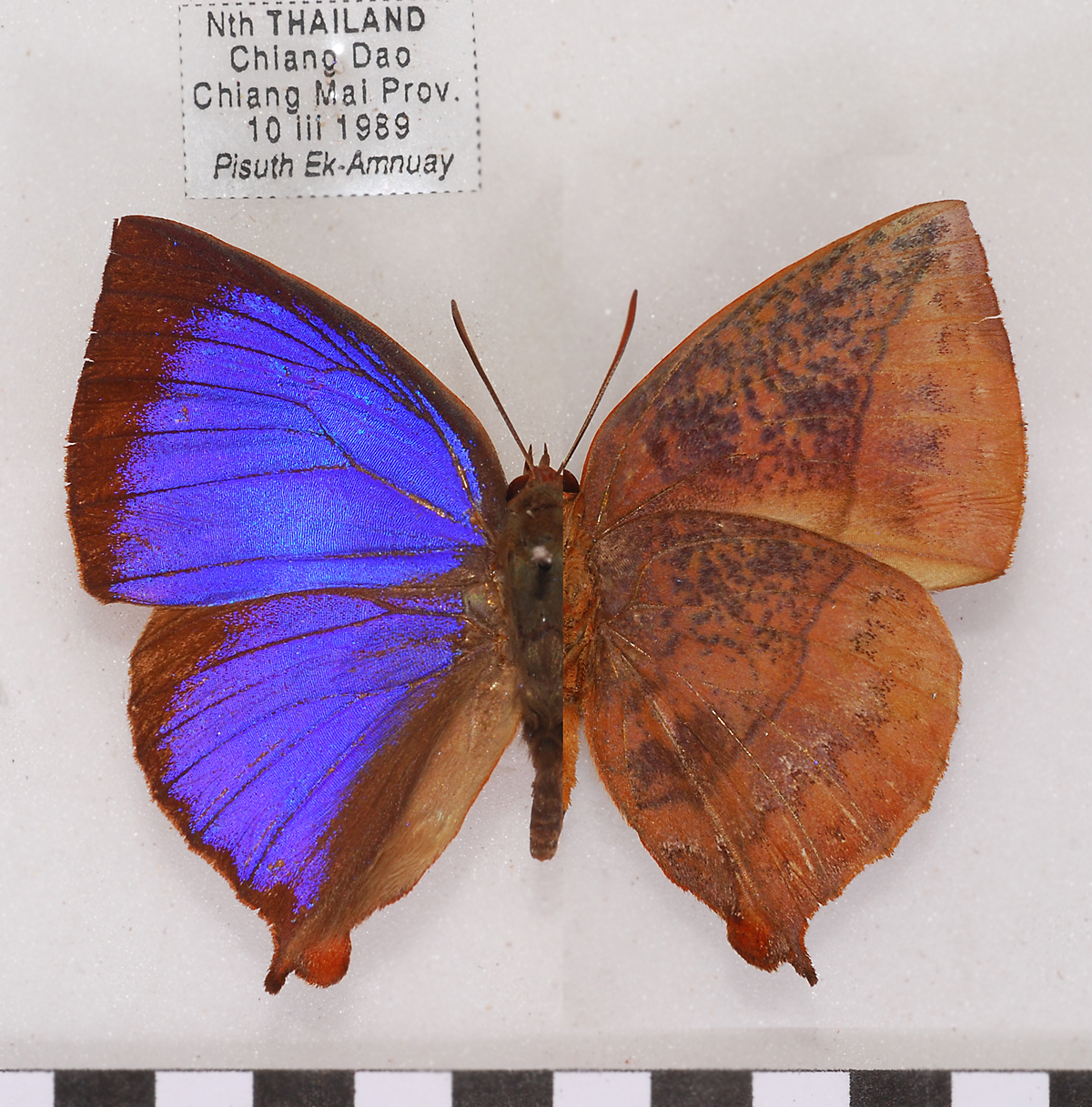
- Amblypodia narada taooana

Scientific classification
- Kingdom: Animalia
- Phylum: Arthropoda
- Clade: Pancrustacea
- Class: Insecta
- Order: Lepidoptera
- Family: Lycaenidae
- Genus: Amblypodia
- Species: A. narada

Binomial name
- Amblypodia narada (Horsfield, [1828])

Synonyms
- Thecla narada Horsfield, [1829]; Amblypodia narada Horsfield, [1828]; Horsfieldia narada f. mohamad Kalis, 1933; Horsfieldia plateni Riley, 1922; Horsfieldia narada confusa Riley, 1922; Amblypodia andersonii Moore, 1884; Amblypodia taooana Moore, 1878; Horsfieldia pycnoptera Toxopeus, 1930

= Amblypodia narada =

Species of butterfly

Amblypodia narada is a species of butterfly belonging to the lycaenid family described by Thomas Horsfield in 1828. It is found in Southeast Asia (Java, Borneo, Philippines, Sulawesi, southern Burma, Thailand, Peninsular Malaya and Sumatra).

== Subspecies ==
- Amblypodia narada narada (Java)
- Amblypodia narada salvia Fruhstorfer, 1907 (northern Borneo)
- Amblypodia narada plateni (Riley, 1922) (Philippines: Mindanao)
- Amblypodia narada erichsonii C. & R. Felder, [1865] (Philippines: Luzon)
- Amblypodia narada confusa Riley, 1922 (Sulawesi, Banggai)
- Amblypodia narada andersonii Moore, 1884 (Mergui)
- Amblypodia narada taooana Moore, 1878 (southern Burma, Thailand to Peninsular Malaysia, Langkawi)
- Amblypodia narada fara Fruhstorfer, 1907 (Sumatra)
- Amblypodia narada smedleyi Riley, [1945] (Siberut)
- Amblypodia narada pycnoptera (Toxopeus, 1930) (Nias)
- Amblypodia narada sibutuensis Treadaway & Nuyda, 1993 (Philippines: Sibutu)
- Amblypodia narada orla Fruhstorfer, 1907 (eastern Java)
