= Arhopala tindali =

Scientific classification
- Kingdom: Animalia
- Phylum: Arthropoda
- Clade: Pancrustacea
- Class: Insecta
- Order: Lepidoptera
- Family: Lycaenidae
- Genus: Arhopala
- Species: A. tindali

Binomial name
- Arhopala tindali Ribbe, 1899

Synonyms
- Arhopala eurissus var. tindali Ribbe, 1899; Narathura styx Evans, 1957

Species of butterfly

Arhopala tindali is a butterfly in the family Lycaenidae. It was described by Carl Ribbe in 1899. It is found on the Solomon Islands and New Britain.

Bethune-Baker considered tindali to be merely a darker form of Arhopala eurisus.

Tennant considers it synonymous (conspecific) with Arhopala styx
