= Euploea nechos =

Scientific classification
- Kingdom: Animalia
- Phylum: Arthropoda
- Class: Insecta
- Order: Lepidoptera
- Family: Nymphalidae
- Genus: Euploea
- Species: E. nechos

Binomial name
- Euploea nechos Mathew, 1887

Species of butterfly

Euploea nechos is a butterfly found in the Solomon Islands that belongs to the danaid group of the brush-footed butterflies family. The species was first described by Mathew in 1887.

== Subspecies ==
- E. n. nechos
- E. n. pronax Godman & Salvin, 1888
- E. n. prusias Godman & Salvin, 1888

== See also ==
- Butterflies of the Solomon Islands
