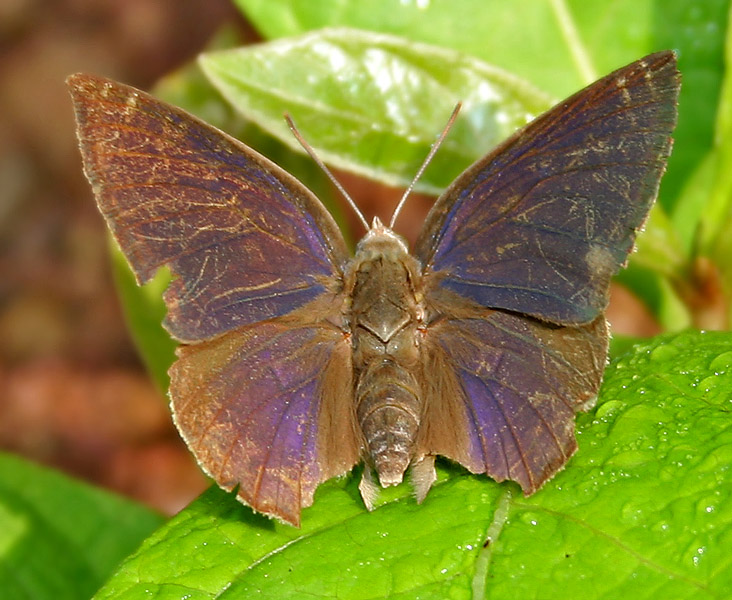
- Adult male purple leaf blue (Amblypodia anita)

Scientific classification
- Kingdom: Animalia
- Phylum: Arthropoda
- Clade: Pancrustacea
- Class: Insecta
- Order: Lepidoptera
- Family: Lycaenidae
- Tribe: Amblypodiini
- Genus: Amblypodia; Horsfield, 1829

= Amblypodia =

Butterfly genus in family Lycaenidae

Amblypodia is a genus of butterflies in the family Lycaenidae. Several species formerly placed here are now in Arhopala and Flos, although this placement is not necessarily definite.

The remaining species of Amblypodia are:

- Amblypodia anita – purple leaf blue
- Amblypodia annetta - darkish brown
- Amblypodia narada - blue and brown shades

The species of this genus are found in the Indomalayan realm (mainly) and the Australasian realm.
