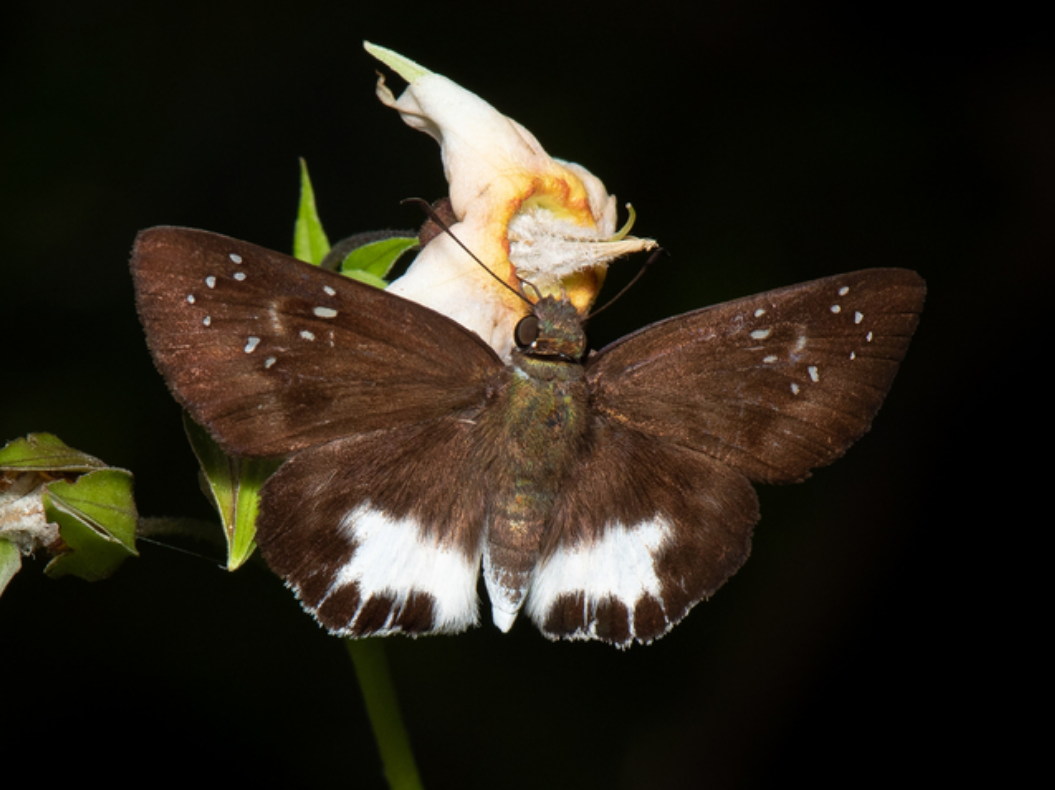
- Subspecies martinus

Scientific classification
- Kingdom: Animalia
- Phylum: Arthropoda
- Clade: Pancrustacea
- Class: Insecta
- Order: Lepidoptera
- Family: Hesperiidae
- Genus: Tagiades
- Species: T. trebellius

Binomial name
- Tagiades trebellius (Hopffer, 1874)

Synonyms
- Pterygospidea trebellius Hopffer, 1874; Tagiades mitra avathana Fruhstorfer, 1910; Tagiades martinus nicaja Fruhstorfer, 1910; Tagiades sivoa canonicus Fruhstorfer, 1910; Tagiades persimilis Rothschild, 1916

= Tagiades trebellius =

Species of butterfly

Tagiades trebellius is a butterfly in the family Hesperiidae (subfamily Pyrginae).

== Description ==
It is a distinctly discernible form; a larger skipper, with a complete, closed circle of rather thick, small hyaline spots on the forewing; on the hindwing the marginal spots begin to form a closed row of spots.

== Subspecies ==
- T. t. trebellius (Sulawesi)
- T. t. sem Mabille, 1883 (Sangihe, Talaud)
- T. t. martinus Plötz, 1884 (Japan)
- T. t. mitra Mabille, 1895 (Sula Islands)

Tagiades trebellius martinus larvae feed on Dioscorea alata, D. cirrhosa (Dioscoreaceae).
