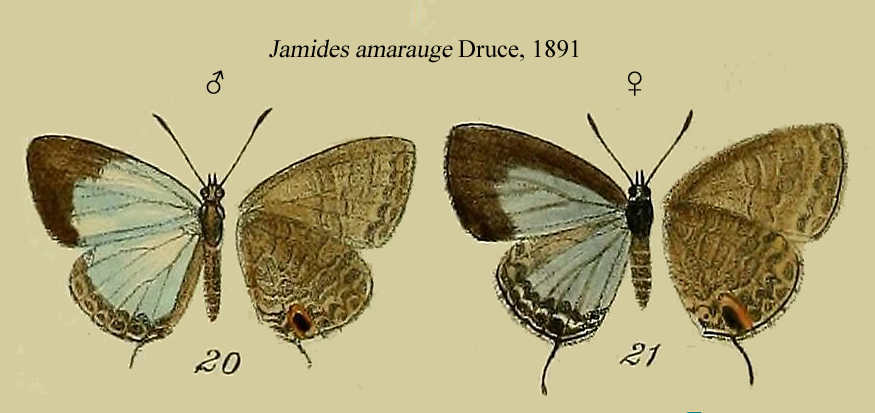

Scientific classification
- Domain: Eukaryota
- Kingdom: Animalia
- Phylum: Arthropoda
- Class: Insecta
- Order: Lepidoptera
- Family: Lycaenidae
- Genus: Jamides
- Species: J. amarauge

Binomial name
- Jamides amarauge H. H. Druce, 1891

= Jamides amarauge =

Species of butterfly

Jamides amarauge, the amarauge cerulean, is a butterfly in the family Lycaenidae. It was described by Hamilton Herbert Druce in 1891. It is found in the Australasian realm.

The larvae feed on the flowers of Pueraria lobata.

== Subspecies ==
- J. a. amarauge (New Guinea, Bougainville, Shortlands, Guadalcanal, Florida Island, Darnley Island)
- J. a. amandae Rawlins, Cassidy, Müller, Schröder & Tennent, 2014 (Aru)
- J. a. hepworthi Tennent, 2001 (Solomon Islands)
