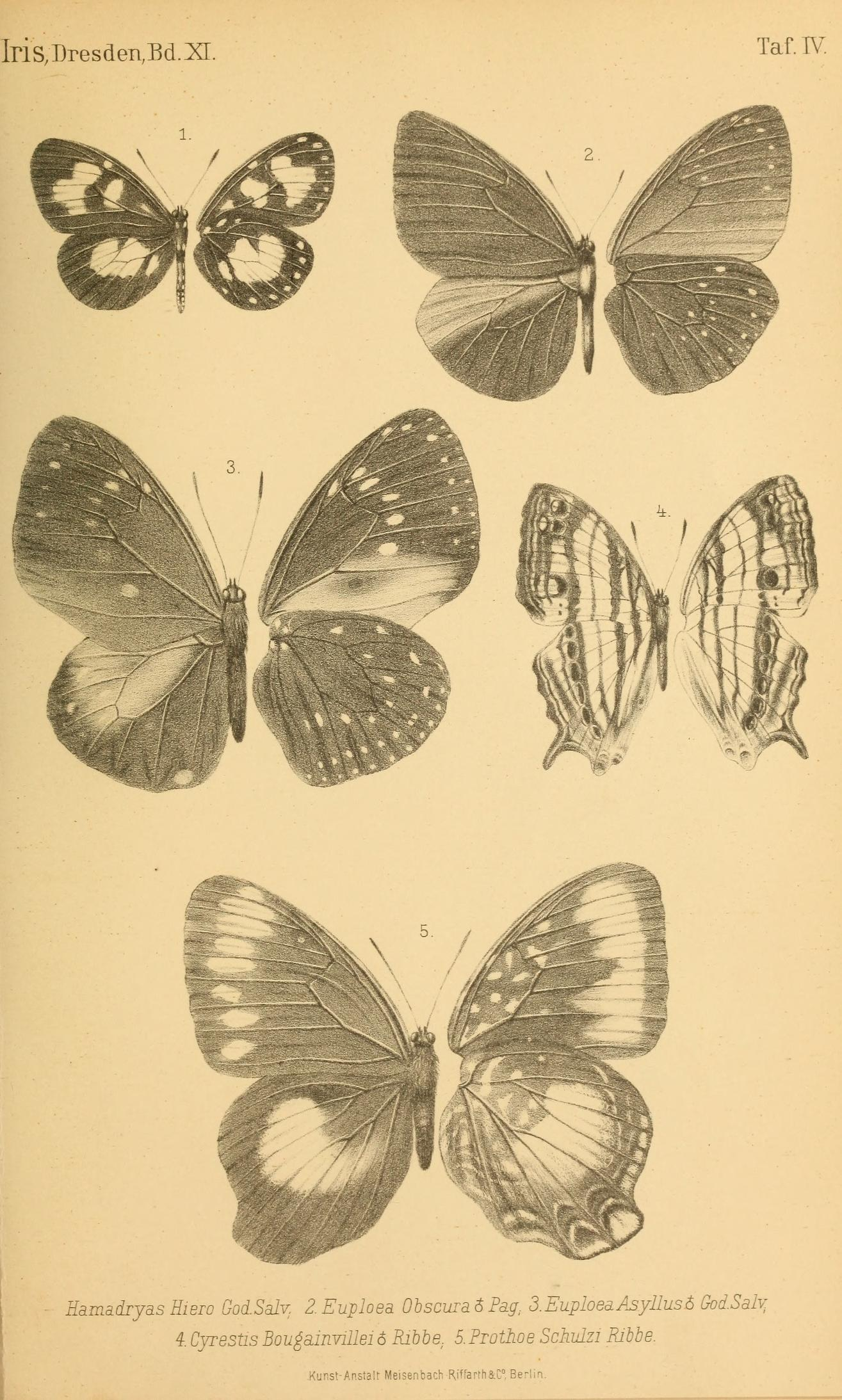

Scientific classification
- Kingdom: Animalia
- Phylum: Arthropoda
- Clade: Pancrustacea
- Class: Insecta
- Order: Lepidoptera
- Family: Nymphalidae
- Genus: Euploea
- Species: E. asyllus

Binomial name
- Euploea asyllus Godman & Salvin, 1888

= Euploea asyllus =

Species of butterfly

Euploea asyllus is a species of nymphalid butterfly in the Danainae subfamily. It is endemic to the Solomon Islands. Subspecies E. a. gerion Godman & Salvin, 1888 is found on Malaita.
