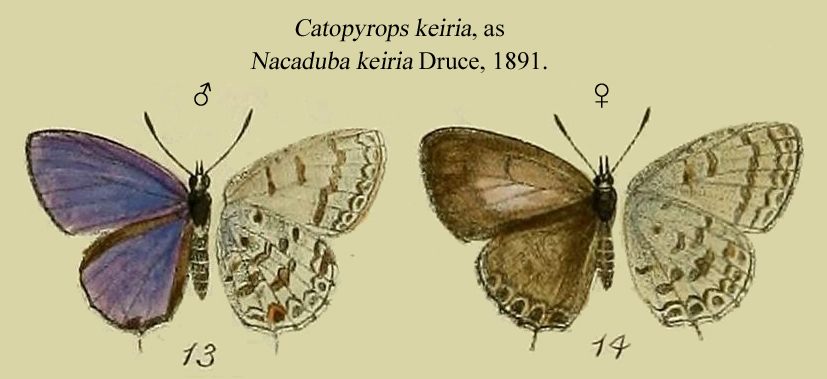
- Male and female, from the original description

Scientific classification
- Domain: Eukaryota
- Kingdom: Animalia
- Phylum: Arthropoda
- Class: Insecta
- Order: Lepidoptera
- Family: Lycaenidae
- Genus: Catopyrops
- Species: C. keiria

Binomial name
- Catopyrops keiria (H. H. Druce, 1891)

= Catopyrops keiria =

Species of butterfly

Catopyrops keiria is a species of butterfly belonging to the lycaenid family described by Hamilton Herbert Druce in 1891. It is endemic to the Solomon Islands in the Australasian realm.
