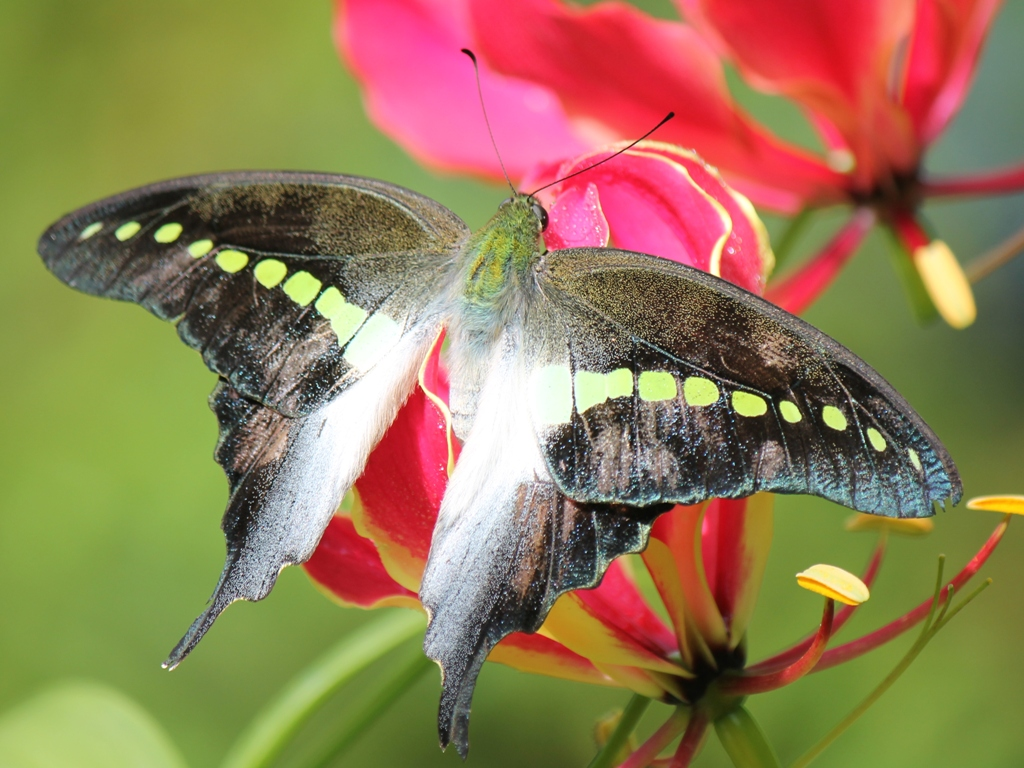

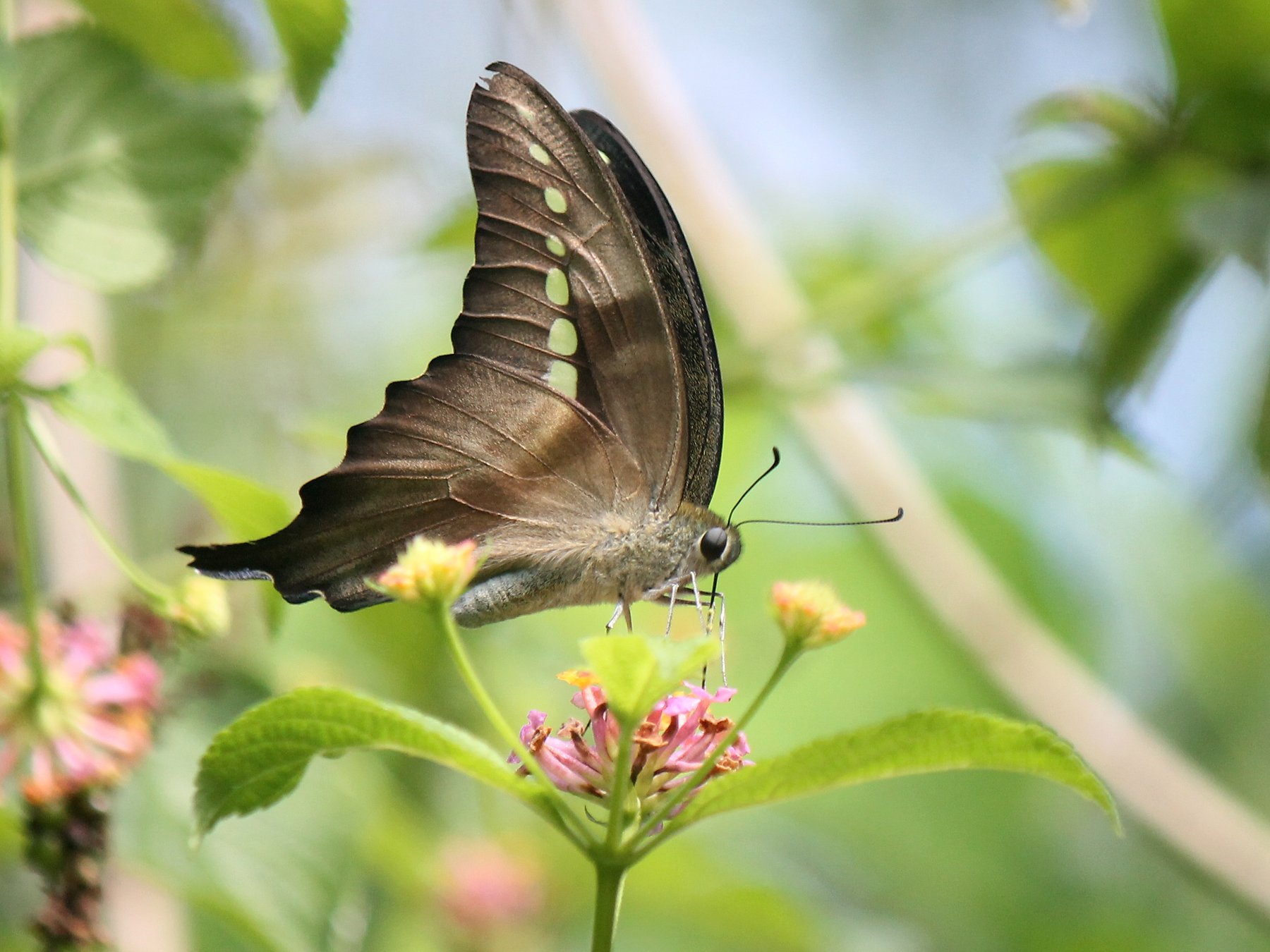

Scientific classification
- Kingdom: Animalia
- Phylum: Arthropoda
- Clade: Pancrustacea
- Class: Insecta
- Order: Lepidoptera
- Family: Papilionidae
- Genus: Graphium
- Species: G. codrus

Binomial name
- Graphium codrus Cramer, 1777

= Graphium codrus =

Species of butterfly

Graphium codrus is a butterfly of the family Papilionidae, that is found in the Philippines, Celebes and Solomon Islands.

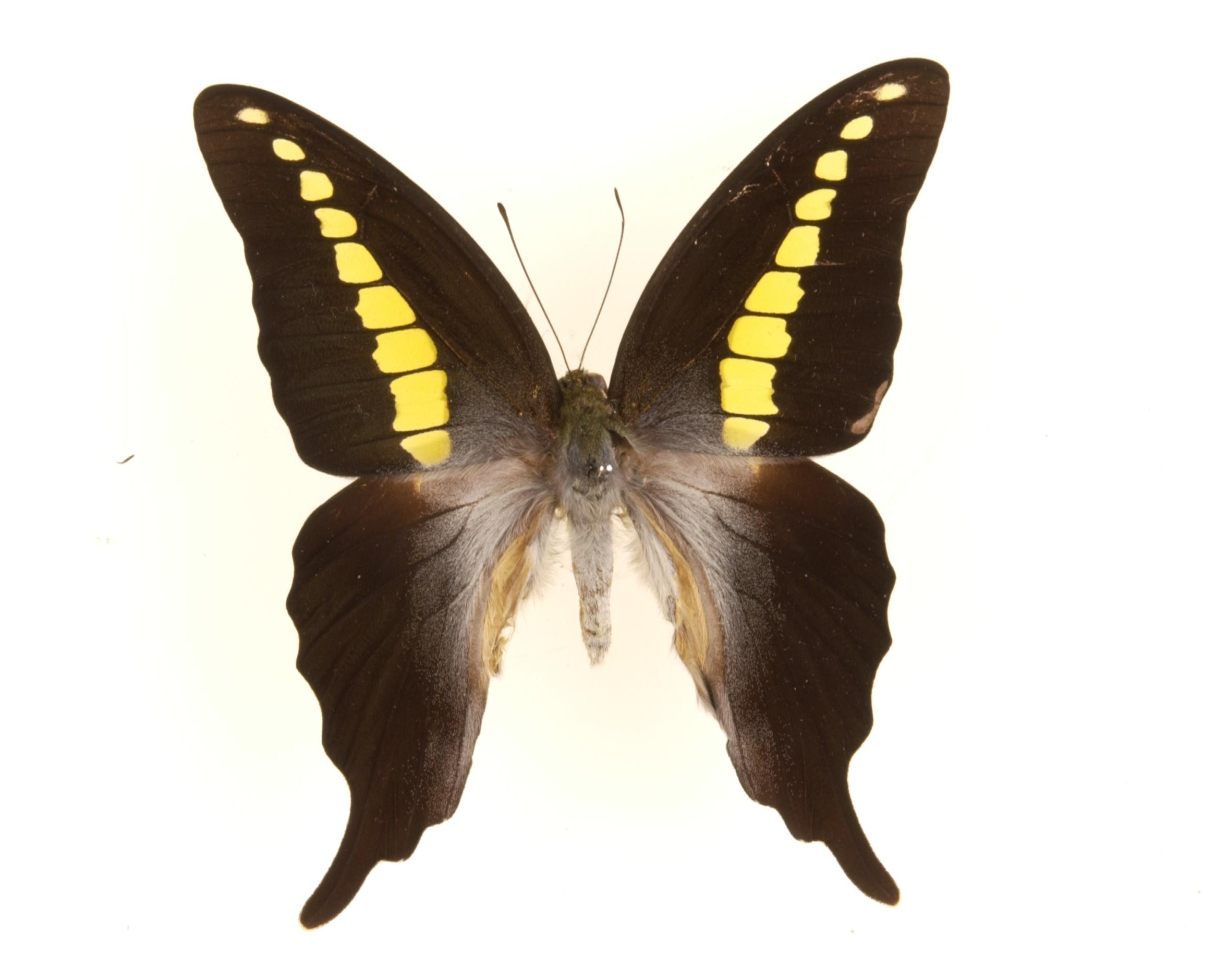
Museum specimen

== Description ==
The body with white-grey hairs, the upperside of the head and thorax green. Upper surface of the wings silky black-green in the male somewhat paler and almost entirely without gloss in the female; forewing with a macular band extending from the apex to the middle of the hindmargin, which is often incomplete and is above green or yellow and scaleless, beneath green-white and scaled; hindwing elongate-triangular, with broad tail, the base and the abdominal margin to about the apex of the cell grey-white. The under surface blackish brown, distally to the hand of the forewing only with light and dark shadows, the hindwing, however, often with triangular costal patch as continuation of the band of the forewing; distinct submarginal spots are absent both above and beneath. Full-grown larva yellowish green, the 3 thoracic segments each with a pale red spine at either side, a similar pair of spines on the last segment, the stigmata blue, on segments 4, 11 and 12 a number of small blue dorsal spots (Kuhn). According to Wahnes the larva has in New Guinea a large brown dorsal spot, yellow-edged posteriorly, which extends from the 3rd to the 5th segment, and a smaller brown spot on the 11. segment.Pupa pale green, slightly bluish or yellowish, head obtuse, rounded, with only very feebly produced angles; thoracic horn sharply pointed, with brown tip, the lateral keel running out into the margin of the wings straight, the small lateral tubercle of the mesothorax pointed, without brown spot.

== Biology ==
The food-plants are trees with large leaves divided into five lobes [Hernandia, Annona, Uvaria]. The butterfly has a very swift and straight flight; it mostly flies high in the air among the tops of trees, yet it often darts down with lightning speed to feed at flowers or rotten fruit (with which it can be baited); it is especially often seen at the sea-shore, where it is fond of drinking on damp sand.

== Subspecies ==
Fifteen See Seitz op. cit. page 93 and Funet
