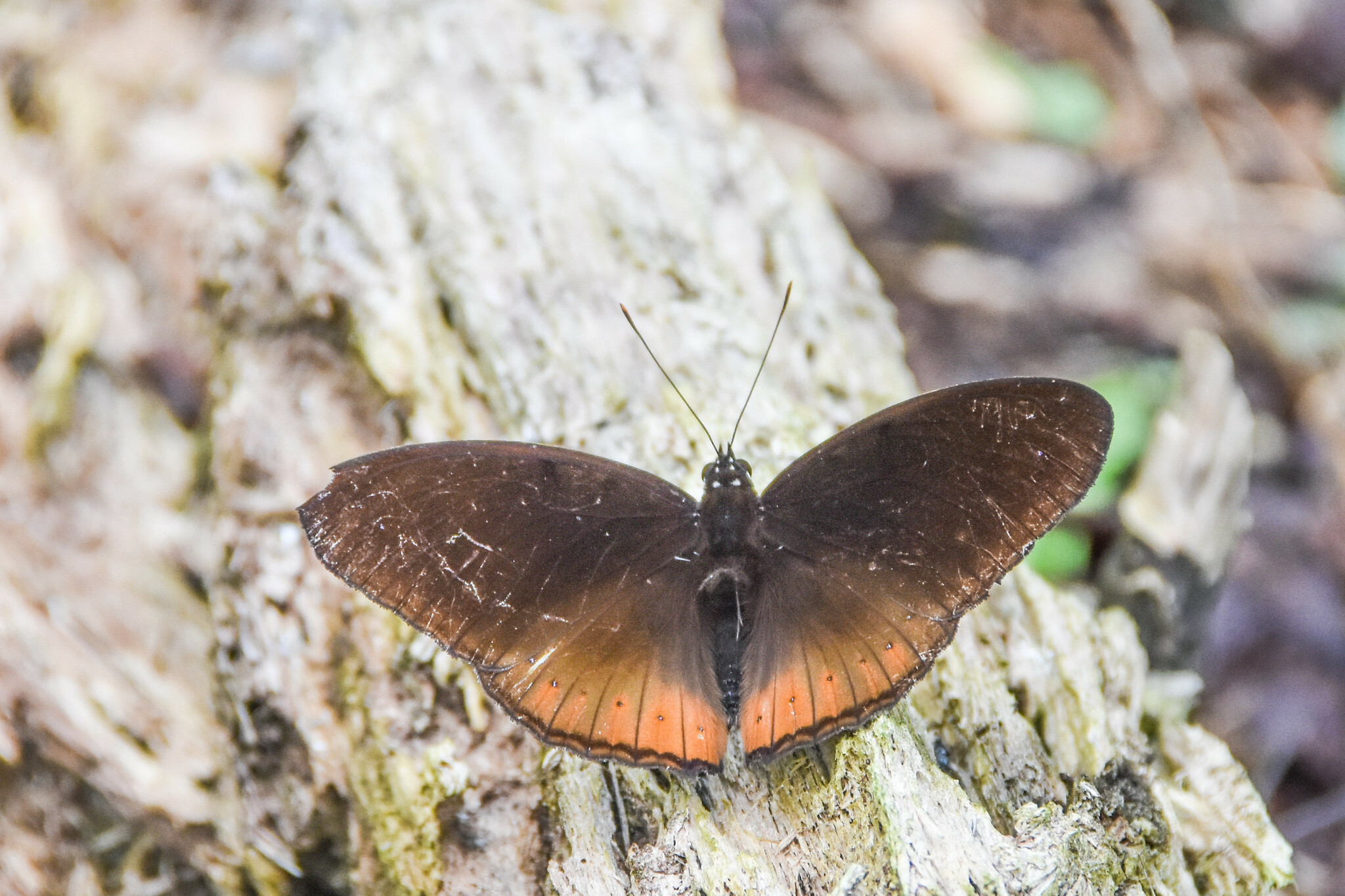

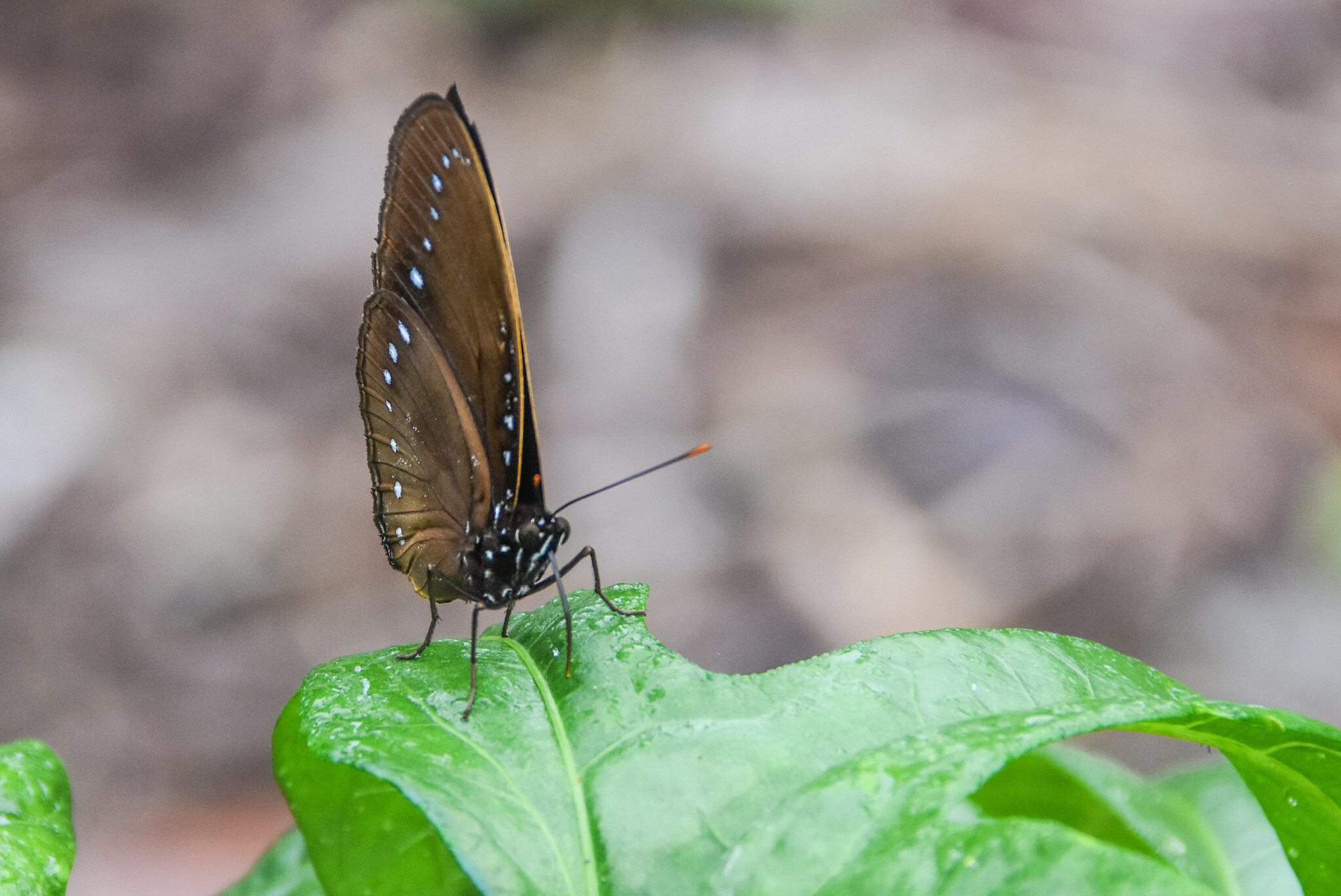

Scientific classification
- Kingdom: Animalia
- Phylum: Arthropoda
- Class: Insecta
- Order: Lepidoptera
- Family: Nymphalidae
- Genus: Hypolimnas
- Species: H. pithoeca

Binomial name
- Hypolimnas pithoeca Kirsch, 1877

Synonyms
- Diadema unicolor Salvin & Godman, 1877

= Hypolimnas pithoeca =

Species of butterfly

Hypolimnas pithoeca is a butterfly in the family Nymphalidae. It is found in New Guinea.

== Subspecies ==
- Hypolimnas pithoeca pithoeca Kirsch, 1877 (New Guinea)
- Hypolimnas pithoeca bradleyi Howarth, 1962 (Rennell Island)
- Hypolimnas pithoeca dampierensis Rothschild, 1915 (Dampier Island)
- Hypolimnas pithoeca ferruginea Howarth, 1962 (Bellona Island)
- Hypolimnas pithoeca fumosus Joicey & Noakes, 1915 (Biak)
- Hypolimnas pithoeca gretheri Clark, 1946 (Admiralty Islands)
- Hypolimnas pithoeca salomona D'Abrera, 1977 (Gudalcanal)
- Hypolimnas pithoeca vulcanica Rothschild, 1915 (Manam Island)
