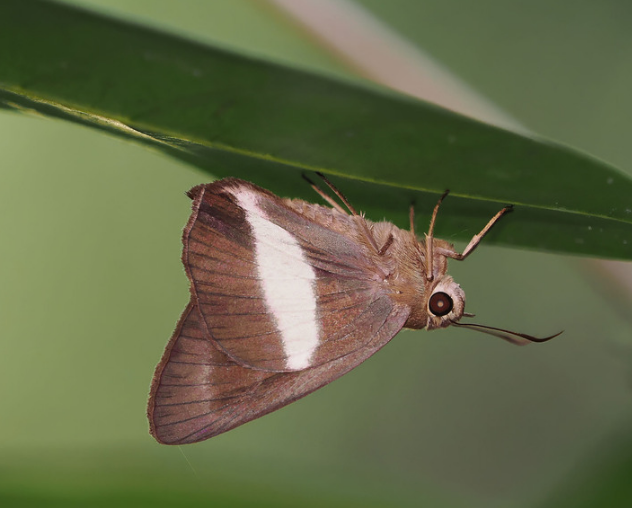

Scientific classification
- Kingdom: Animalia
- Phylum: Arthropoda
- Class: Insecta
- Order: Lepidoptera
- Family: Hesperiidae
- Genus: Hasora
- Species: H. hurama

Binomial name
- Hasora hurama (Butler, 1870)

Synonyms
- Hesperia hurama Butler, 1870; Hasora vivapama Fruhstorfer, 1911; Hasora postfasciata Rothschild, 1915; Hasora hurama vivapama Fruhstorfer, 1911

= Hasora hurama =

Broad-banded awl

Species of butterfly

Hasora hurama, the broad-banded awl, is a butterfly of the family Hesperiidae. It is found in Australia (north-eastern coast of the Northern Territory, the northern Gulf and the north-eastern coast of Queensland), Irian Jaya, Maluku, the Solomon Islands and Papua New Guinea.

The wingspan is about 50 mm (2.0 in).

The larvae feed on Derris trifoliata. They live in a shelter made by joining leaves with silk.

== Subspecies ==
- Hasora hurama hurama
- Hasora hurama mola Evans, 1949 (Bacan)
