= Anthene paraffinis =

Scientific classification
- Domain: Eukaryota
- Kingdom: Animalia
- Phylum: Arthropoda
- Class: Insecta
- Order: Lepidoptera
- Family: Lycaenidae
- Genus: Anthene
- Species: A. paraffinis

Binomial name
- Anthene paraffinis (Fruhstorfer, 1916)

Synonyms
- Lycaenesthes paraffinis Fruhstorfer, 1916

Species of butterfly

Anthene paraffinis is a butterfly in the family Lycaenidae. It is found in South-east Asia.

== Subspecies ==
- A. p. paraffinis (New Britain, Duke of York, New Ireland, Fen, Witu Islands, Bougainville, Vella Lavella, Gizo, Choiseul, Alu, Rendova, Treasury Islands)
- A. p. nissani Tite, 1966 (Nissan Island)
- A. p. mathias Tite, 1966 (St. Matthias, Squally Islands)
- A. p. nereia Tite, 1966 (Gizo, Guadalcanal, Florida Island, Tulagi, Ugi, Malaita)
- A. p. emoloides Tite, 1966 (Sula, Buru, New Guinea)
