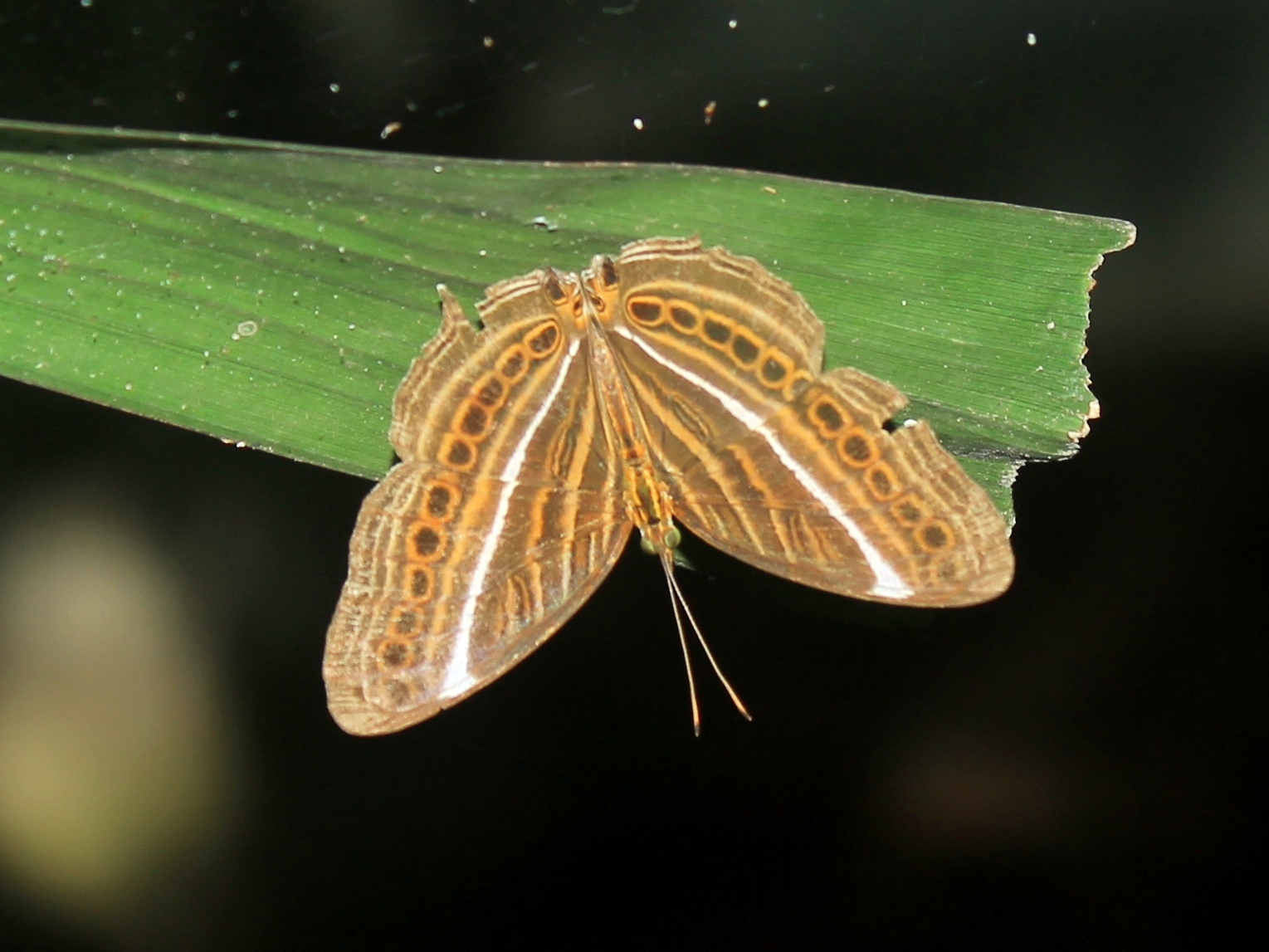
- Cyrestis acilia strigata at Manado, North Sulawesi

Scientific classification
- Domain: Eukaryota
- Kingdom: Animalia
- Phylum: Arthropoda
- Class: Insecta
- Order: Lepidoptera
- Family: Nymphalidae
- Genus: Cyrestis
- Species: C. acilia

Binomial name
- Cyrestis acilia (Godart, 1819)

Synonyms
- Nymphalis acilia Godart, 1819; Cyrestis acilia tervisia Fruhstorfer, 1912; Cyrestis acilia gades Fruhstorfer, 1915; Cyrestis strigata C. & R. Felder, 1862; Cyrestis strigata; Cyrestis biaka Grose-Smith, 1894; Cyrestis laelia C. & R. Felder, 1860; Cyrestis parthenia Röber, 1887; Cyrestis acilia ribbei Martin, 1903; Cyrestis acilia bassara Fruhstorfer, 1912; Cyrestis solomonis Mathew, 1887; Cyrestis nitida Mathew, 1887; Cyrestis fratercula Salvin & Godman, 1877; Cyrestis eximia Oberthür, 1879; Cyrestis acilia bassara Fruhstorfer, 1912

= Cyrestis acilia =

Species of butterfly

Cyrestis acilia is a butterfly in the family Nymphalidae. It is found in Sulawesi the Australasian realm including Sulawesi mainland, Buton island, Kabaena island and Wowoni island. See subspecies.

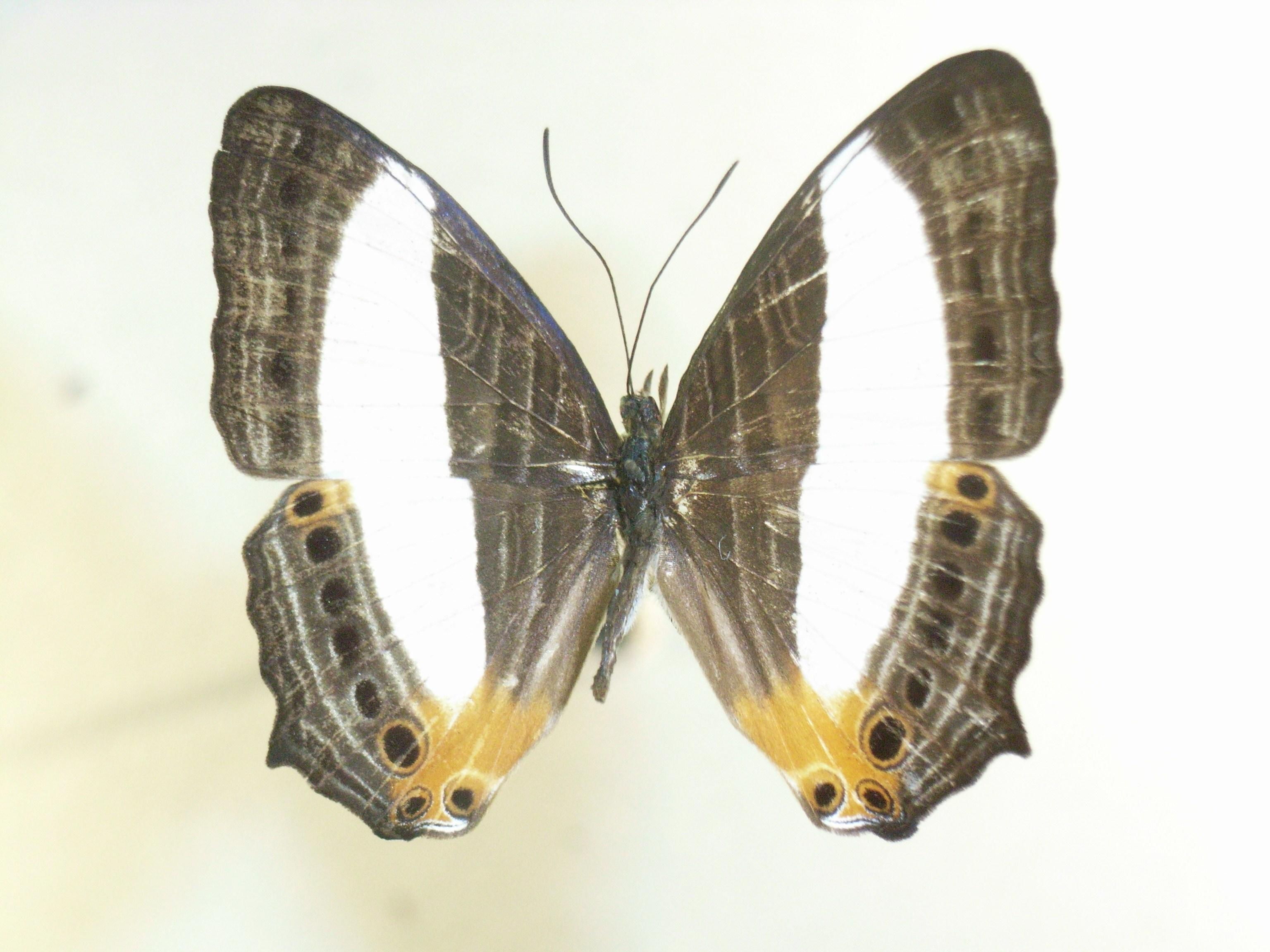
upperside

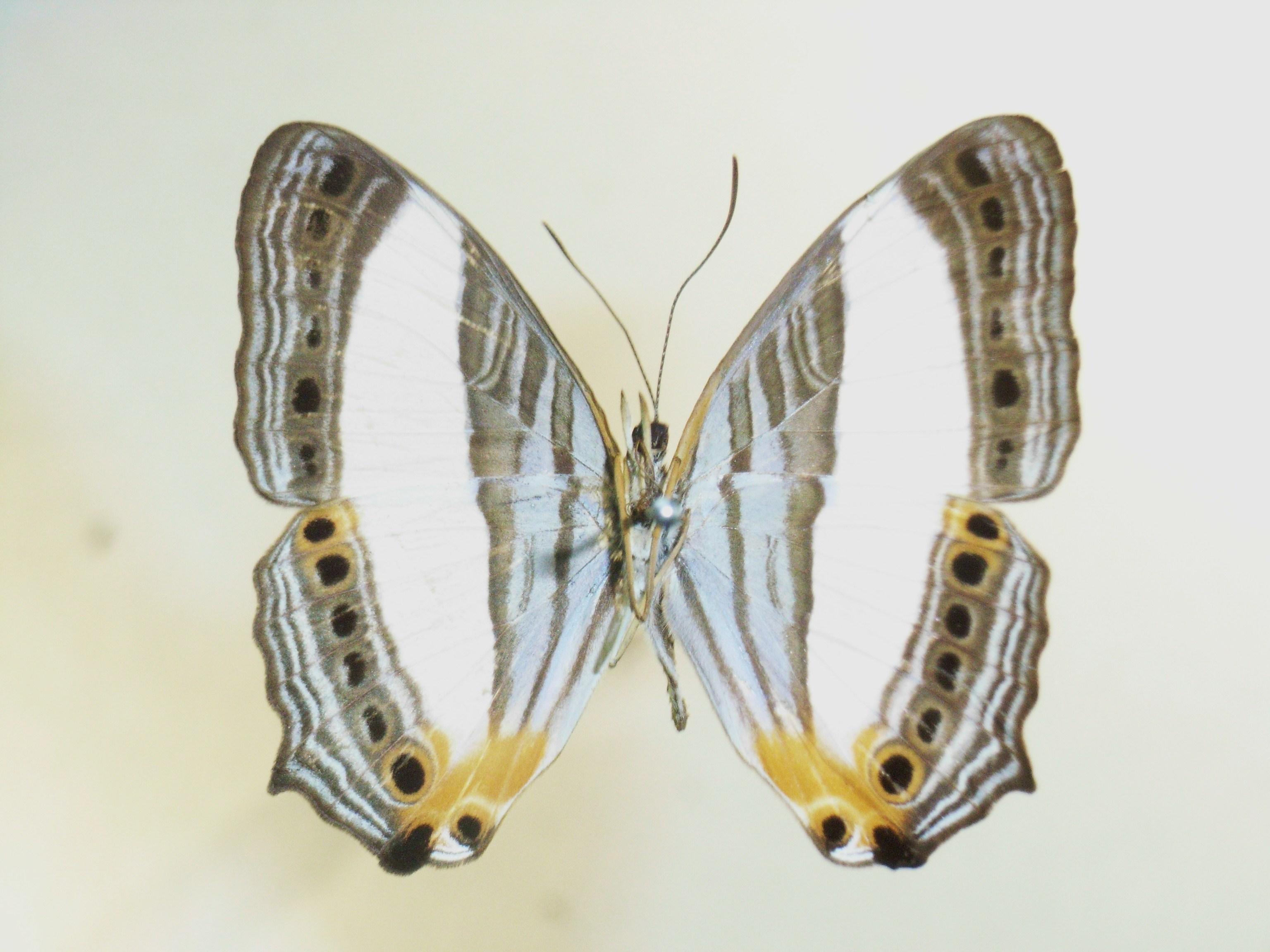
underside

== Description ==
acilia is at a glance recognized by the very broad white median band tapering both towards the costa of the forewing and the anal margin of the hindwing, and by the uncommonly vivid and extensive orange colouring of the anal area on the hindwing. It is the only Cyrestis species, in which the row of ocelli in the submarginal band on the forewing, which is but very faintly bordered with yellow, becomes obsolete in the middle, having of the six ocelli usually found in this group only 3—4 that are distinctly developed. At the apex of the hindwing moreover, the line which accompanies the inner border of the row of ocelli is, proximally to the uppermost ocellus, yellow instead of black-brown. On the hindwing. the second and third ocelli (counting from the anal angle) are distinctly elongate and reniform, particularly on the under surface. The anal ocellus is round, reversed ocellus distinct, anal projection quite insignificant. The females which are not at all scarce, are somewhat larger, of lighter and more faded colour, especially in the anal area of the hindwing, where the orange colour appears quite faded and irrorated with brownish.

== Subspecies ==
- Cyrestis acilia acilia
- Cyrestis acilia abisa Fruhstorfer, 1904 (Obi)
- Cyrestis acilia aruana Martin, 1903 (Aru)
- Cyrestis acilia bettina Fruhstorfer, 1899 (Sula Islands)
- Cyrestis acilia biaka Grose-Smith, 1894 (Biak)
- Cyrestis acilia ceramensis Martin, 1903 (Ambon, Serang)
- Cyrestis acilia dola Fruhstorfer, 1904 (Fergusson Island, Kiriwina)
- Cyrestis acilia eximia Oberthür, 1879 (Sanghie Islands)
- Cyrestis acilia fratercula Salvin & Godman, 1877 (New Britain, Duke of York, New Ireland, New Hanover)
- Cyrestis acilia haterti Martin, 1903 (Halmahera)
- Cyrestis acilia jordani Martin, 1903 (Morotai)
- Cyrestis acilia kumambana van Mastrigt, 2010 (Papua New Guinea)
- Cyrestis acilia laelia (C. & R. Felder, 1860) (Batchian)
- Cyrestis acilia latifascia Martin, 1903 (Ternate)
- Cyrestis acilia maforensis Martin, 1903 (Mafor Island)
- Cyrestis acilia misolensis Martin, 1903 (Misol)
- Cyrestis acilia moorensis van Mastrigt, 2010 (Papua New Guinea)
- Cyrestis acilia nitida Mathew, 1887 (Solomon Islands)
- Cyrestis acilia parthenia Röber, 1887 (Banggai)
- Cyrestis acilia russellensis Tennent, 2001 (Solomon Islands)
- Cyrestis acilia sicca Fruhstorfer, 1904 (Buru)
- Cyrestis acilia solomonis Mathew, 1887 (Solomon Islands)
- Cyrestis acilia strigata C. & R. Felder, 1862 (Sulawesi, Togian, Kabaena, Wowoni, Butung)
- Cyrestis acilia ulawana Martin, 1903 (Ulawa Island)
