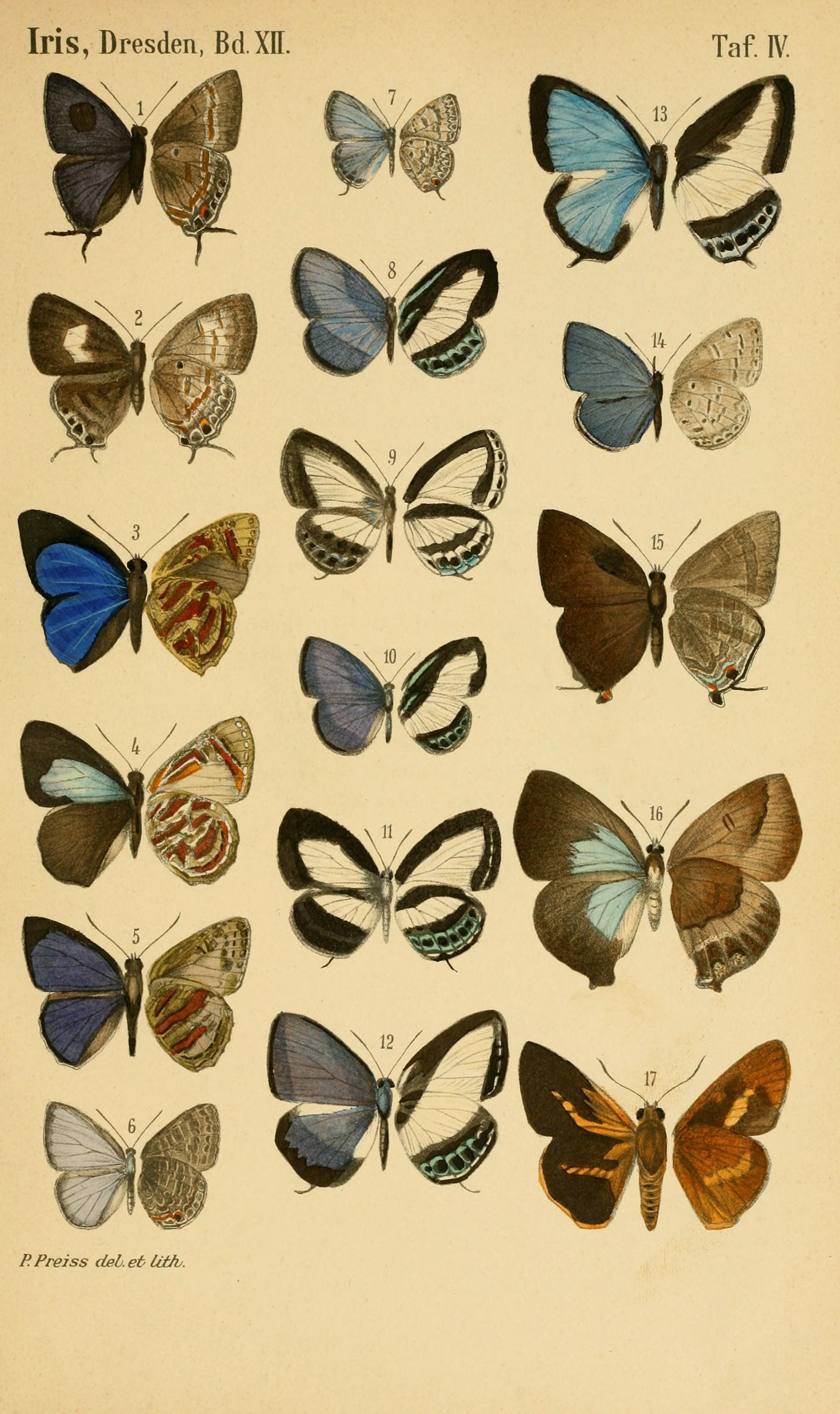
- Amblypodia annetta faisina Ribbe, 1899 (fig.17 female)

Scientific classification
- Domain: Eukaryota
- Kingdom: Animalia
- Phylum: Arthropoda
- Class: Insecta
- Order: Lepidoptera
- Family: Lycaenidae
- Genus: Amblypodia
- Species: A. annetta

Binomial name
- Amblypodia annetta Staudinger, [1888].

= Amblypodia annetta =

Species of butterfly

Amblypodia annetta is a species of butterfly belonging to the lycaenid family described by Otto Staudinger in 1888. It is found in the Australasian realm.

== Subspecies ==
- A a. annetta Bachan
- A. a. annettina Fruhstorfer, 1903 Obi
- A. a. elga Fruhstorfer, 1907 Obi
- A. a. anna Staudinger, 1888 Ambon, Serang, Saparua
- A. a. faisina Ribbe, 1899 Faisi Island
- A. a. fabiana Fruhstorfer, 1907 Waigeu
- A. a. eberalda Fruhstorfer, 1907 New Guinea

== Biology ==
The larva feeds on Salacia primodes.
