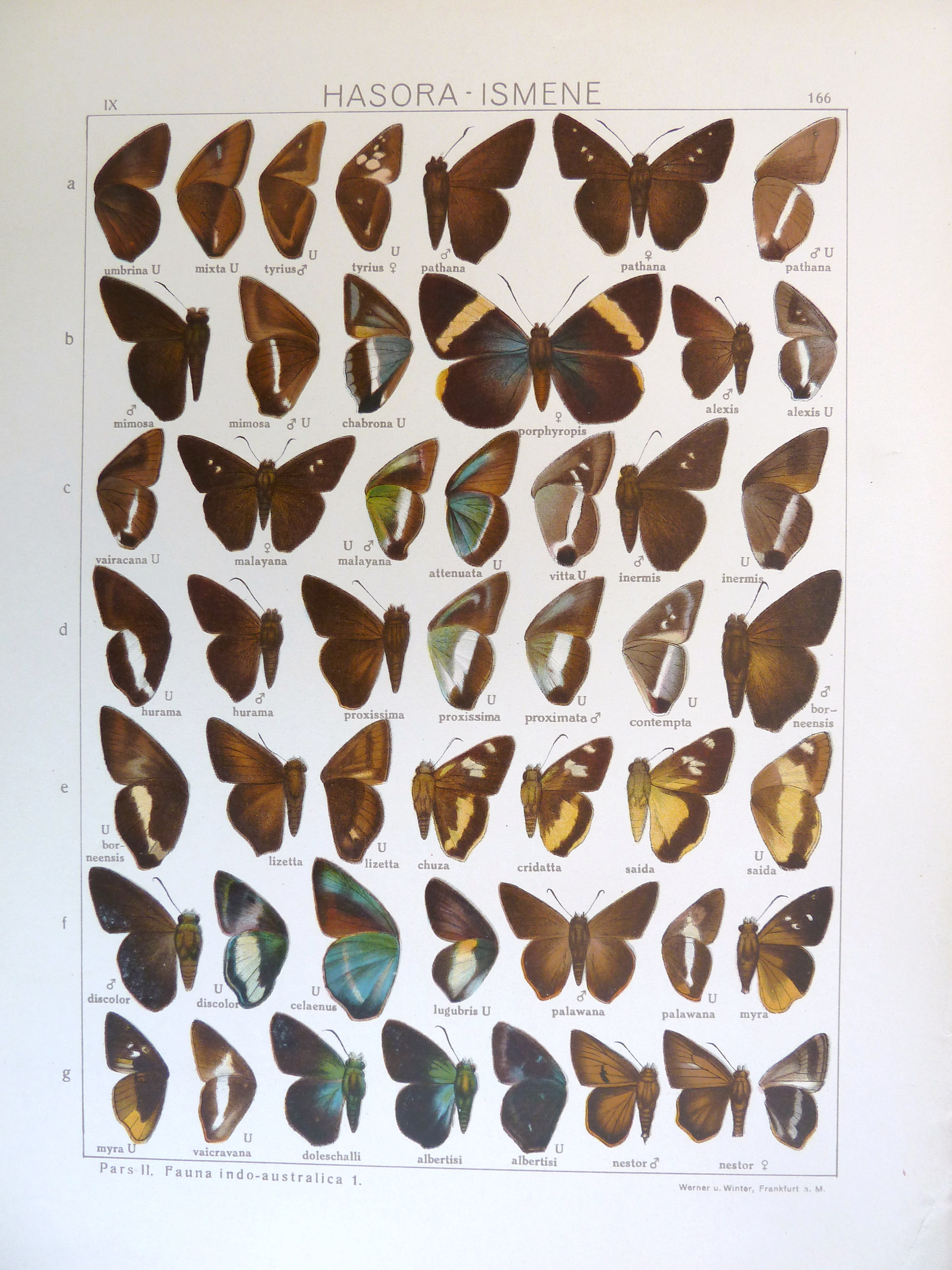

Scientific classification
- Domain: Eukaryota
- Kingdom: Animalia
- Phylum: Arthropoda
- Class: Insecta
- Order: Lepidoptera
- Family: Hesperiidae
- Genus: Allora
- Species: A. doleschallii

Binomial name
- Allora doleschallii (C. Felder, 1860)

Synonyms
- Ismene doleschallii Felder, 1860

= Allora doleschallii =

Species of butterfly

Allora doleschallii (peacock awl) is a butterfly of the family Hesperiidae. It is found from Indonesia to the Solomon Islands, while subspecies Allora doleschallii doleschallii is found on the north-east coast of Australia.The name honours Carl Ludwig Doleschall.

The wingspan is about 40 mm (1.6 in).

The larvae feed on Rhyssopterys timorensis.

== Subspecies ==
- A. d. albertisi (Oberthür, 1880) New Guinea
- A. d. gazaka (Fruhstorfer, 1911) Buru
- A. d. viridicans (Fruhstorfer, 1911) Aru, Key Island
