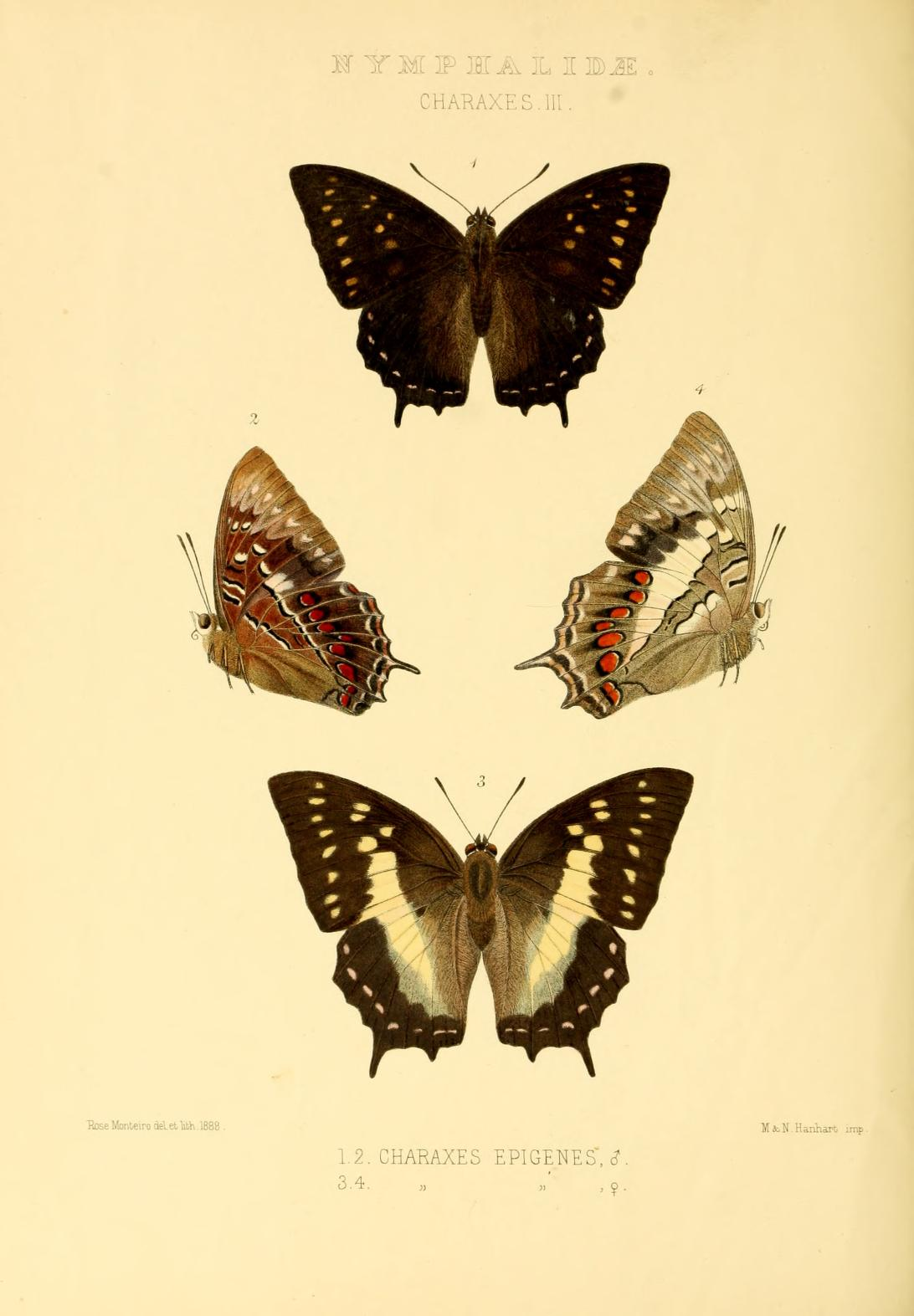
- In Henley Grose-Smith's Rhopalocera Exotica

Scientific classification
- Kingdom: Animalia
- Phylum: Arthropoda
- Class: Insecta
- Order: Lepidoptera
- Family: Nymphalidae
- Genus: Charaxes
- Species: C. epigenes

Binomial name
- Charaxes epigenes (Godman & Salvin, 1888)

Synonyms
- Polyura epigenes; Charaxes (Eulepsis) epigenes f. monochromus Niepelt, 1914

= Polyura epigenes =

Species of butterfly

Charaxes (Polyura) epigenes is a butterfly in the family Nymphalidae. It was described by Frederick DuCane Godman and Osbert Salvin in 1888. It is endemic to the Solomon Islands.

== Subspecies ==
- C. e. epigenes (Tulagi, Guadalcanal)
- C. e. monochroma (Niepelt, 1914) (Bougainville, Shorthlan Island, Choiseul Island, Vella Lavella, Rendova, Santa Isabel)

== Description ==
E. epigenes Godm. and Salv. becomes interesting by the unlikeness of the sexes, as is never noticed in a similar way in the Eriboea, but only in Charaxes. Male above purple and with a blackish hue over it. Forewing with indistinct, yellowish submarginal and transcellular small streaks. Hindwing with a series of blue spots of the same appearance and distribution as in E. pyrrhus jupiter. Under surface reddish chestnut-brown. Female larger by more than half. Upper surface with a steep vertical whitish longitudinal band being repeated beneath, though softened down and darkened. Salomon Islands. Very rare. But few specimens discovered so far.
