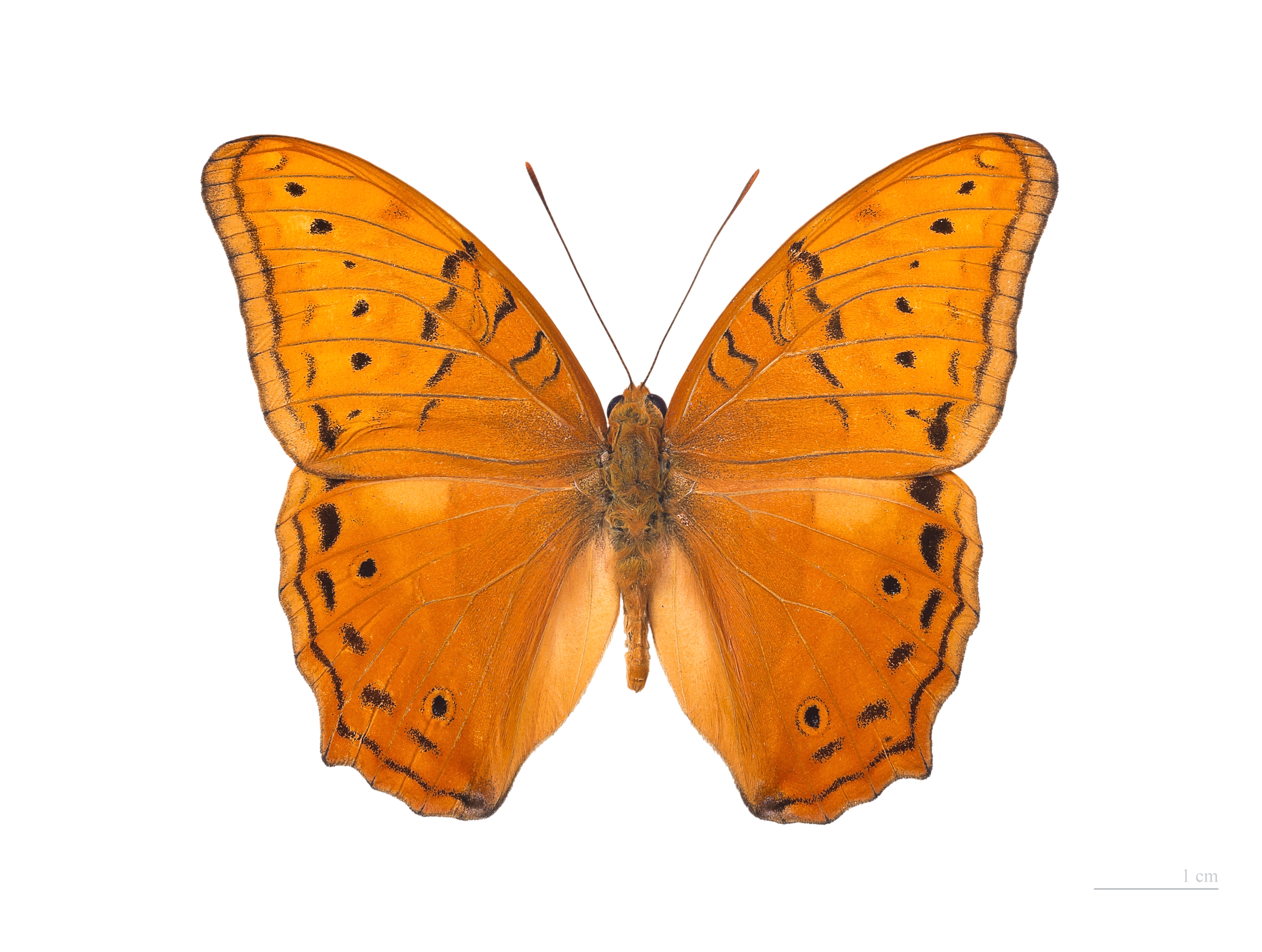
- Male, dorsal view
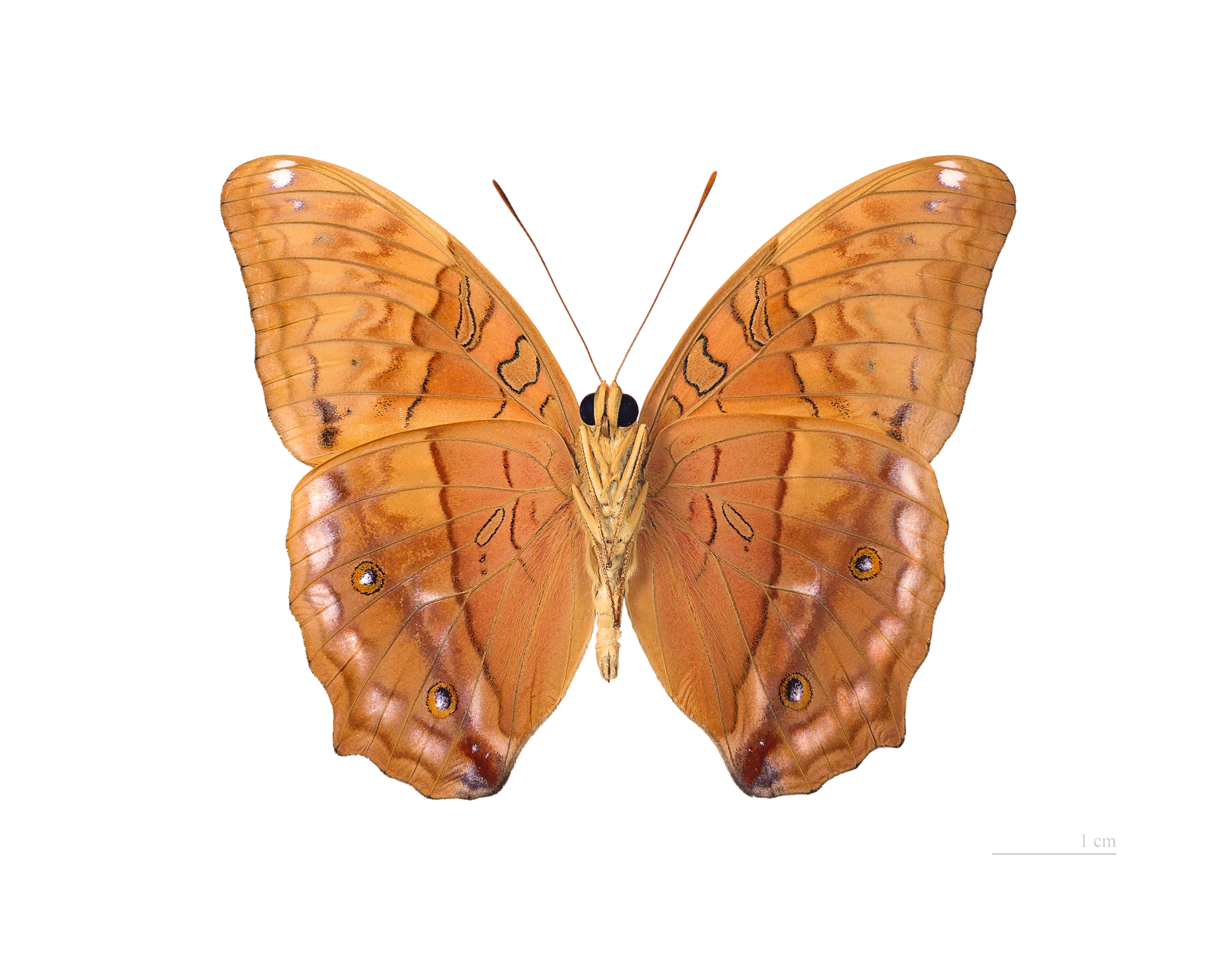
- Male, ventral view

Scientific classification
- Kingdom: Animalia
- Phylum: Arthropoda
- Clade: Pancrustacea
- Class: Insecta
- Order: Lepidoptera
- Family: Nymphalidae
- Genus: Vindula
- Species: V. arsinoe

Binomial name
- Vindula arsinoe (Cramer, 1777)

Subspecies
- See text

= Vindula arsinoe =

Cruiser

Species of butterfly

Vindula arsinoe, the Eastern cruiser or just the cruiser, is a butterfly from the family Nymphalidae. It ranges from the Maluku Islands and New Guinea to the Solomon Islands and Queensland. It is sexually dimorphic.

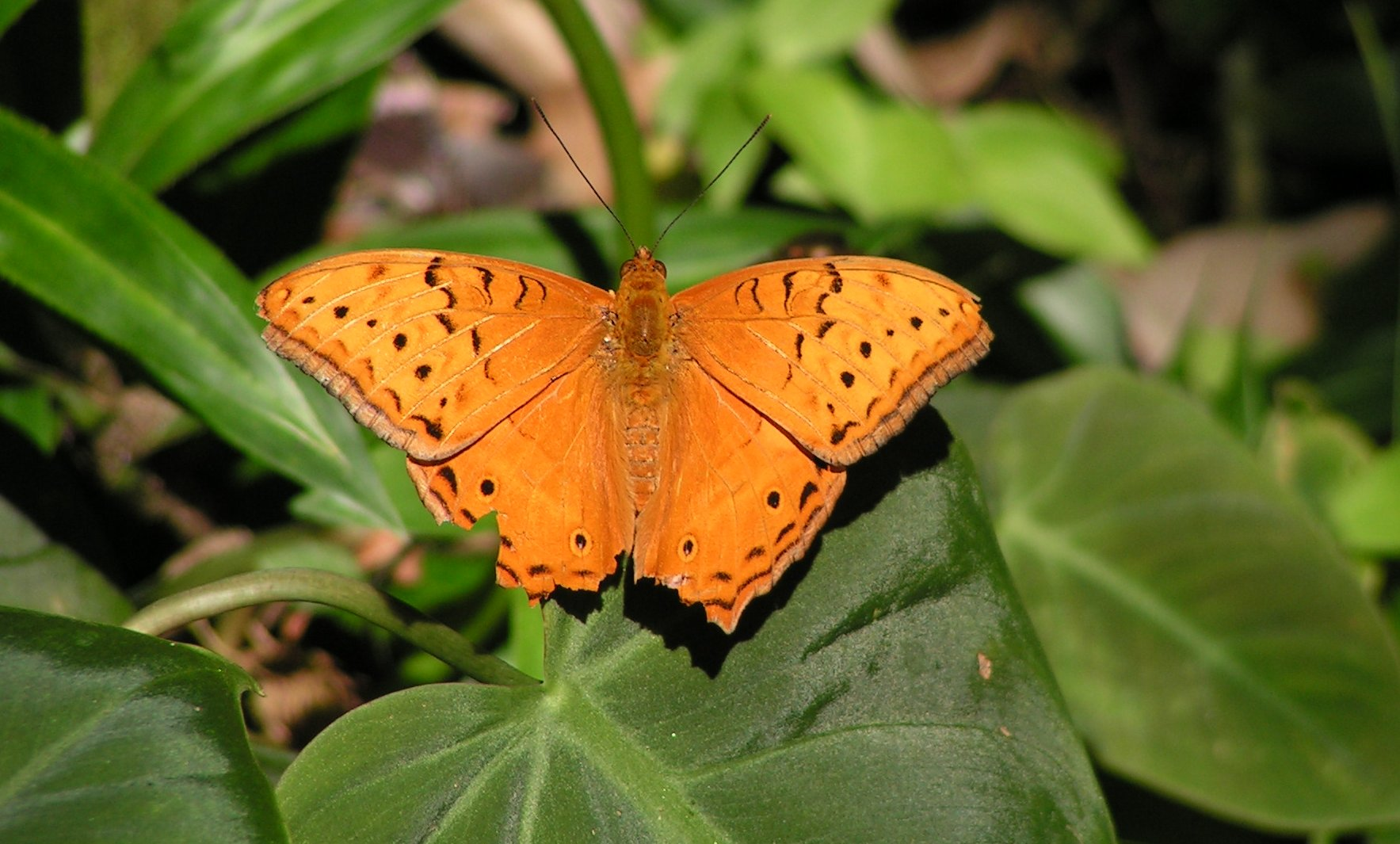
Dorsal view of male, Cairns, Queensland

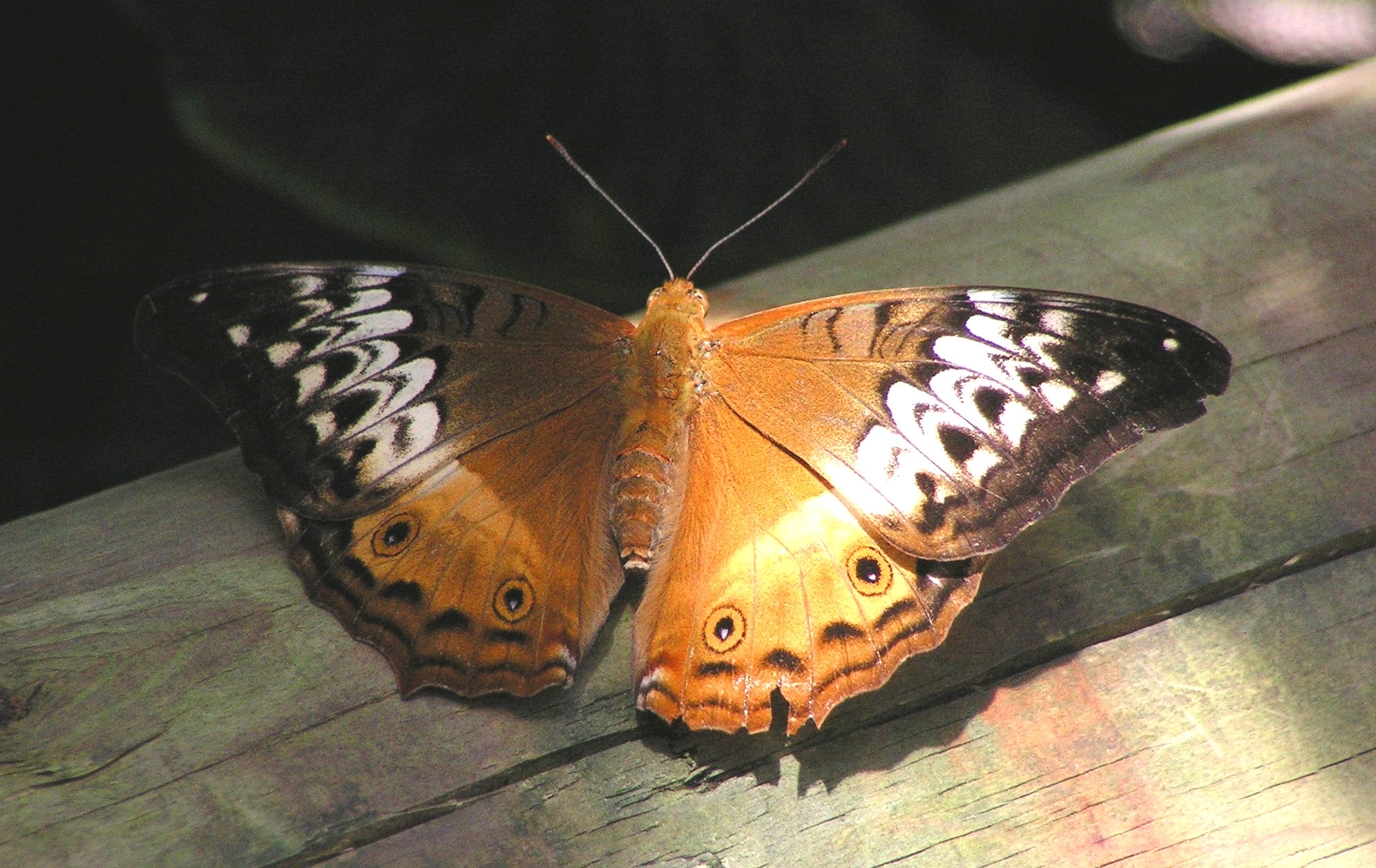
Female, Cairns, Queensland

== Subspecies ==
Listed alphabetically:

- V. a. ada (Butler, 1874) – (Banks Island, Cape York - Mackay)
- V. a. adina (Fruhstorfer, 1906) – (Waigeu)
- V. a. arsinoe (Cramer, [1777]) – (Ambon, Serang, Saparua)
- V. a. bosnikensis (Joicey & Noakes, 1915) – (Biak)
- V. a. catenes (Godman & Salvin, 1888) – (Solomons (Santa Anna Island))
- V. a. clodia (Godman & Salvin, 1888) – (Solomons (Ulana Island))
- V. a. dampierensis (Rothschild, 1915) – (Dampier Island)
- V. a. figalea (Fruhstorfer, 1904) – (Obi)
- V. a. insularis (Godman & Salvin, 1877) – (New Britain, Duke of York group)
- V. a. lemina (Ribbe, 1898) – (New Ireland)
- V. a. meforica (Fruhstorfer, 1906) – (Noemfoor Island)
- V. a. melena (Fruhstorfer, 1899) – (New Ireland)
- V. a. moluccana Nieuwenhuis – (northern Moluccas?)
- V. a. pisidike (Fruhstorfer, 1903) – (Fergusson, Goodenough, Normanby Island)
- V. a. polykaste (Fruhstorfer, 1903) – (Trobriand Island)
- V. a. rebeli (Fruhstorfer, 1906) – (West Irian - Papua)
- V. a. rookiana (Strand, 1916) – (Rook Island)
