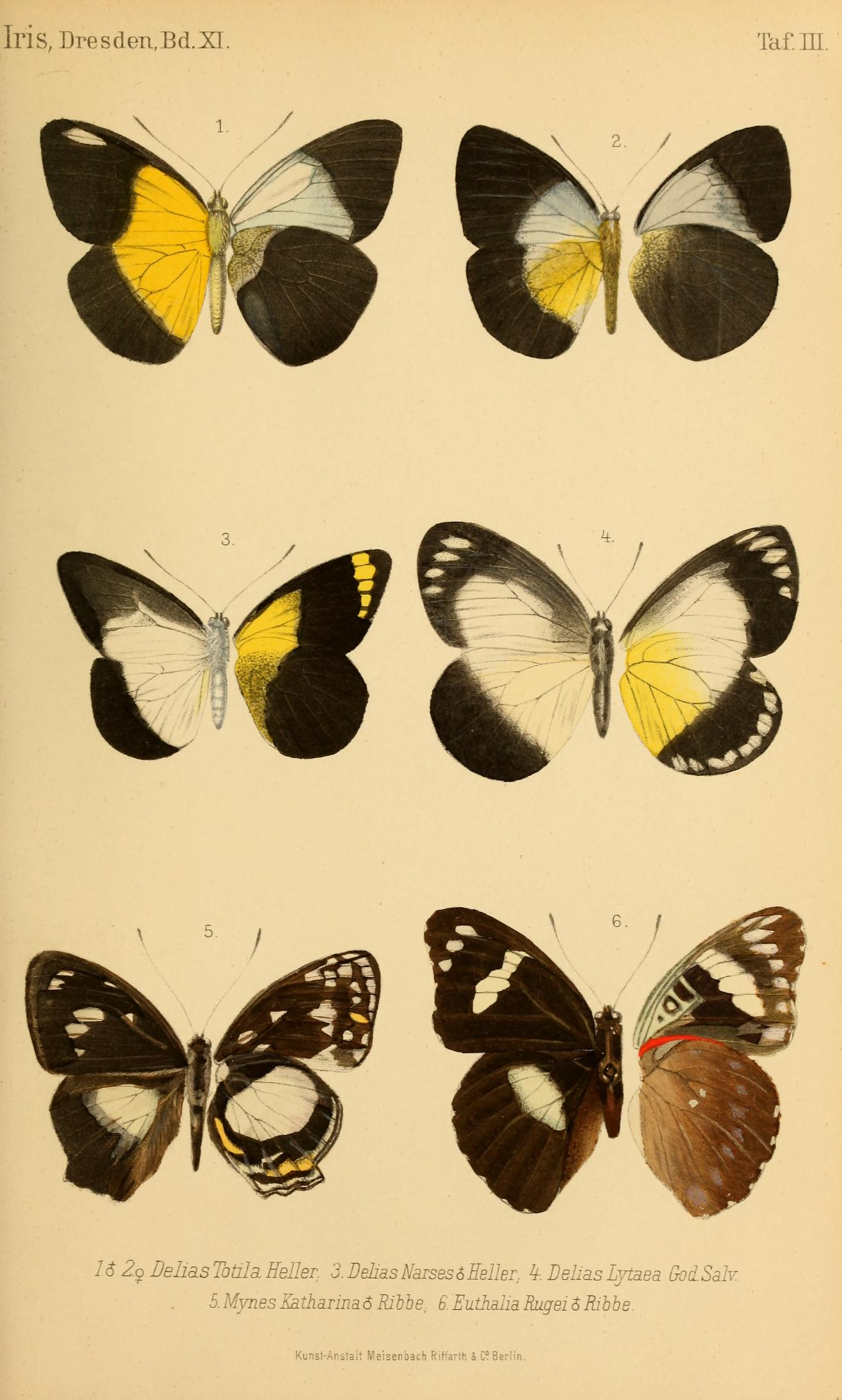
- Delias lytaea in Deutsche Entomologische Zeitschrift

Scientific classification
- Kingdom: Animalia
- Phylum: Arthropoda
- Class: Insecta
- Order: Lepidoptera
- Family: Pieridae
- Genus: Delias
- Species: D. lytaea

Binomial name
- Delias lytaea (Godman and Salvin, 1878)

= Delias lytaea =

Species of butterfly

Delias lytaea is a butterfly in the family Pieridae. It was described by Frederick DuCane Godman and Osbert Salvin in 1878. It is endemic to the Bismark archipelago (New Britain, New Ireland and New Georgia).

== Description ==
D. lytea Godm. is a charming, but rare species of the Bismarck Archipelago, without opaline gloss on the under surface, and also otherwise with duller colours, which present a mealy appearance. The female is more than twice as broadly margined with black as the male. New Pomerania (= New Britain). — Delias georgina Gr.-Sm. [nec C. & R. Felder] (54 b), from the Solomon Islands, appears to differ but very little.

== Subspecies ==
- D. l. lytaea
- D. l. smithi Talbot, 1928 (New Georgia).

== Taxonomy ==
lytaea is a member of the Delias isse species group
