= Delias alberti =

- In Adalbert Seitz

Scientific classification
- Kingdom: Animalia
- Phylum: Arthropoda
- Clade: Pancrustacea
- Class: Insecta
- Order: Lepidoptera
- Family: Pieridae
- Genus: Delias
- Species: D. alberti

Binomial name
- Delias alberti Rothschild, 1904

Species of butterfly

Delias alberti is a butterfly in the family Pieridae. It was described by Walter Rothschild in 1904. It is found in the Indomalayan realm.

The wingspan is about 64 mm.

== Subspecies ==
- Delias alberti alberti (Choiseul Island)
- Delias alberti guava Arora, 1983 (Bougainville Island)
- Delias alberti tetamba Arora, 1983 (St. Isabel Island)
