= Graphium mendana =

Conservation status
- Least Concern (IUCN 3.1)

Scientific classification
- Kingdom: Animalia
- Phylum: Arthropoda
- Clade: Pancrustacea
- Class: Insecta
- Order: Lepidoptera
- Family: Papilionidae
- Genus: Graphium
- Species: G. mendana

Binomial name
- Graphium mendana Godman & Salvin, 1888

Species of butterfly

Graphium mendana is a species of butterfly in the family Papilionidae, that is found in Papua New Guinea and the Solomon Islands.

== See also ==
- East Melanesian Islands
