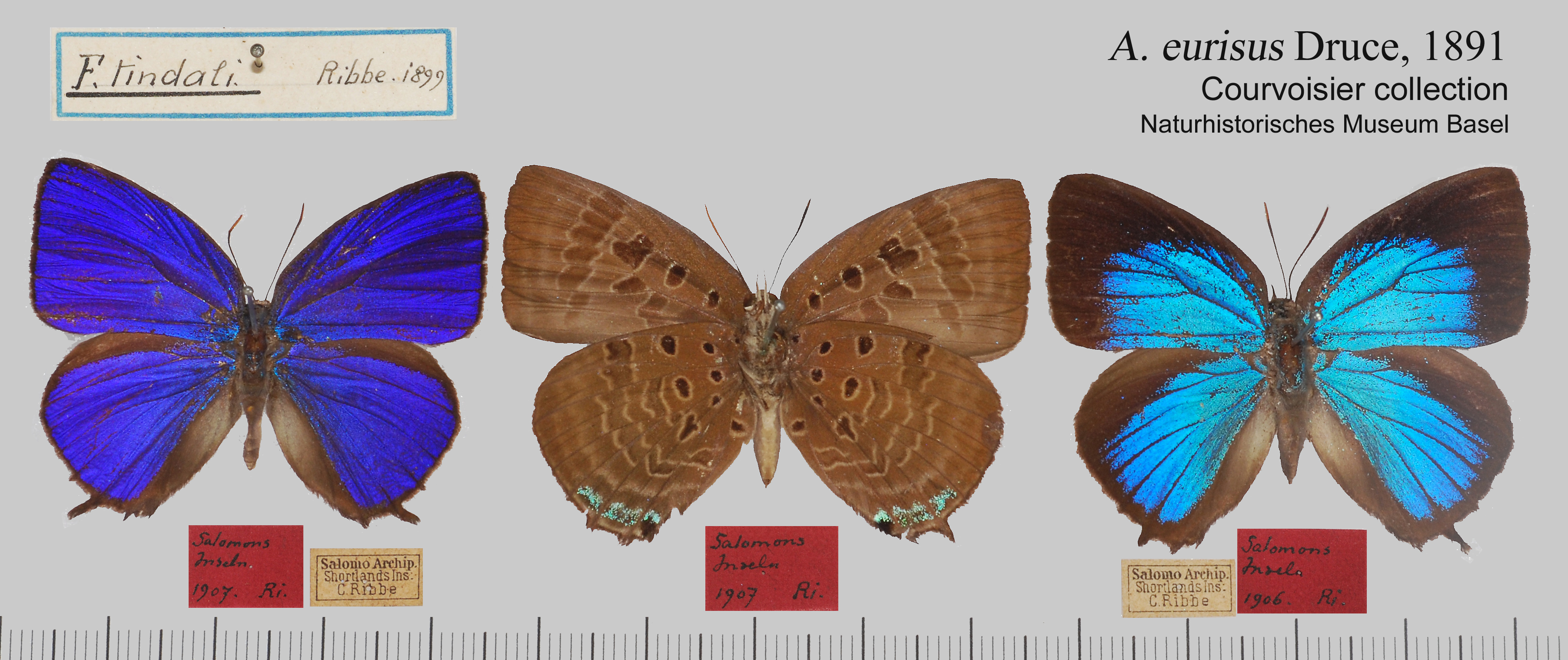
- From the Courvoisier Collection, Basel, Switzerland

Scientific classification
- Kingdom: Animalia
- Phylum: Arthropoda
- Clade: Pancrustacea
- Class: Insecta
- Order: Lepidoptera
- Family: Lycaenidae
- Genus: Arhopala
- Species: A. eurisus

Binomial name
- Arhopala eurisus H. H. Druce, 1891

Synonyms
- Arhopala eurissus var. tindali Ribbe, 1899

= Arhopala eurisus =

Species of butterfly

Arhopala eurisus is a butterfly in the family Lycaenidae. It was described by Hamilton Herbert Druce in 1891. It is found in the Australasian realm (St. Matthias island group, Bismarck Archipelago, Witu Island, Solomon Islands and the New Hebrides). It is recognisable by the lighter and more silvery tint of the upper surface in both sexes; otherwise rather similar to philander.

== Subspecies ==
- Arhopala eurisus eurisus
- Arhopala eurisus tovesi Tennent, 1999 (Solomon Islands)
