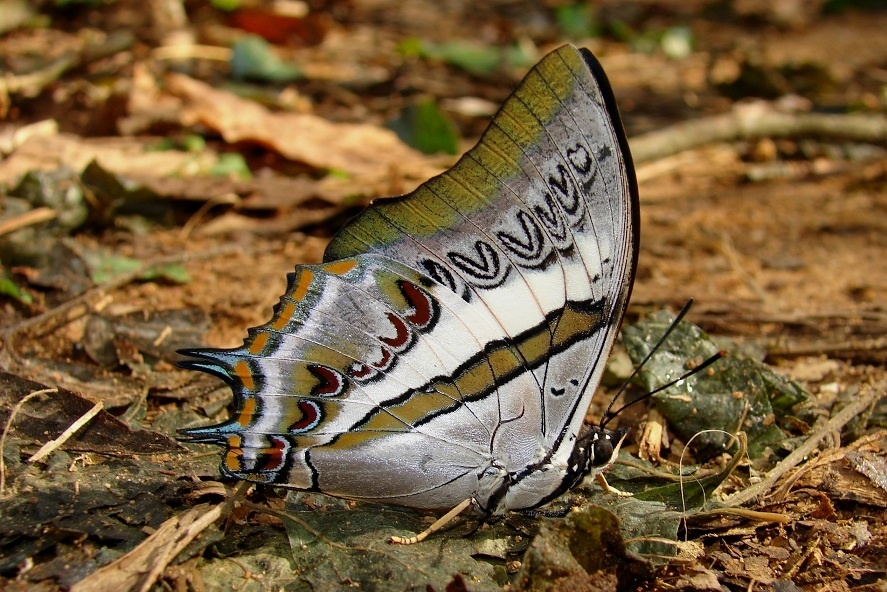
- Polyura schreiber

Scientific classification
- Kingdom: Animalia
- Phylum: Arthropoda
- Class: Insecta
- Order: Lepidoptera
- Family: Nymphalidae
- Genus: Charaxes
- Subgenus: Polyura; Billberg, 1820

Species
- Many, see text

= Polyura =

Subgenus of butterflies

Polyura is a subgenus (or in some schemes a genus) of butterflies also referred to as Nawab butterflies and belonging to the brush-footed butterfly subfamily Charaxinae, or leafwing butterflies. Like the large and conspicuous forest queens (subgenus Euxanthe), they belong to the genus Charaxes, unique genus of the tribe Charaxini.

== Distribution ==
Polyura butterflies are native to the Indomalayan and Australasian realms. They are widespread from Pakistan to Okinawa Island, and from China to Pacific Islands (Fiji, New Caledonia, Vanuatu).

== Systematics ==
- The subgenus Polyura was described by the Swedish naturalist Gustaf Johan Billberg in 1820.
- The type species is Polyura pyrrhus (Linnaeus).

== Taxonomy ==
The subgenus was revised in 1982 by Robert Leslie Smiles based on morphological characters.

The genus Polyura was synonymized with the genus Charaxes in 2009 in a study investigating phylogenetic relationships among Charaxini using DNA sequencing. However the genus Charaxes comprises many morphologically very different groups such as the subgenera Euxanthe and Polyura. A phylogenomic study is ongoing to resolve the phylogenetic placements of these different groups. The sister-group to Polyura seems to comprise the African species Charaxes paphianus and Charaxes pleione. Southeast Asian species of the genus Charaxes do not seem to be closely related to species of the subgenus Polyura.

A comprehensive molecular phylogeny of the subgenus as well as several taxonomic studies have allowed a complete revision of the group. A follow-up study investigating the biogeographical history of the subgenus suggested an origin in the Miocene about 12 million years ago in mainland Asia. The Australasian region was colonized later through dispersal.

== Species ==
The subgenus is divided in three morphological groups supported by molecular phylogenetics:

P. athamas group:

- Charaxes agrarius (Swinhoe, 1887) – Anomalous nawab – southern India, Burma
- Charaxes alphius (Staudinger, 1886) – Staudinger's nawab – Sulawesi, Timor
- Charaxes arja (C. & R. Felder, [1867]) – Pallid nawab – north-eastern India, Sikkim, Assam, Burma, Thailand, Indochina
- Charaxes athamas (Drury, [1773]) – Common nawab
- Charaxes attalus (C. & R. Felder, 1867) - Java, Sumatra
- Charaxes bharata (Leech, 1891) – India
- Charaxes hebe (Butler, [1866]) – Plain nawab
- Charaxes jalysus (C. & R. Felder, [1867]) – Malaysia, Sunda Islands, Thailand
- Charaxes luzonicus (Rothschild, 1899) – Philippines
- Charaxes moori (Distant, 1883) – Malayan nawab – Malaysia, Sunda Islands
- Charaxes paulettae (Toussaint, 2015) – India, Pakistan, Thailand
- Charaxes schreiber (Godart, [1824]) – Blue nawab

P. eudamippus group:

- Charaxes delphis (Doubleday, 1843) – Jewelled nawab – Assam, Burma, Malaya, Sumatra, Borneo
- Charaxes dolon (Westwood, 1847) – Stately nawab – Tibet, China, Kulu, Assam, Burma
- Charaxes eudamippus (Doubleday, 1843) – Great nawab – central China, Kumaon, Assam, Burma
- Charaxes narcaeus (Hewitson, 1854) – China nawab – China, Naga Hills, Abor Valley, northern Burma
- Charaxes nepenthes (Grose-Smith, 1883) – – eastern China
- Charaxes posidonius (Leech, 1891) – Tibet, China
- Charaxes weismanni – (Fritze 1894) – Okinawa Island.Sometimes subspecies of Polyura eudamippus

P. pyrrhus group:

- Charaxes andrewsi (Butler, 1900) – Christmas emperor – Christmas Island
- Charaxes bicolor (Turlin & Sato, 1995) – Solomon Islands
- Charaxes caphontis (Hewitson, 1863) – Fiji
- Charaxes clitarchus (Hewitson, 1874) – New Caledonia
- Charaxes cognatus Vollenhoven, 1861 – Sulawesi blue nawab – Sulawesi
- Charaxes dehanii (Westwood, 1850) – Java, Sumatra
- Charaxes epigenes (Godman & Salvin, 1888) – Solomon Islands
- Charaxes gamma (Lathy, 1898) – New Caledonia
- Charaxes gilolensis (Butler, 1869) – Moluccas
- Charaxes inopinatus (Röber, 1939) – New Britain
- Charaxes jupiter (Butler, 1869) – New Guinea
- Charaxes pyrrhus (Linnaeus, 1758) – Tailed nawab, tailed emperor – Ambon, Ceram
- Charaxes sacco Smart, 1977 – Vanuatu
- Charaxes smilesi Toussaint nec Rydon (Toussaint, 2015) – Ceram
- Charaxes sempronius (Fabricius, 1793) – Tailed emperor, four tail – Australia, Lesser Sunda Islands
