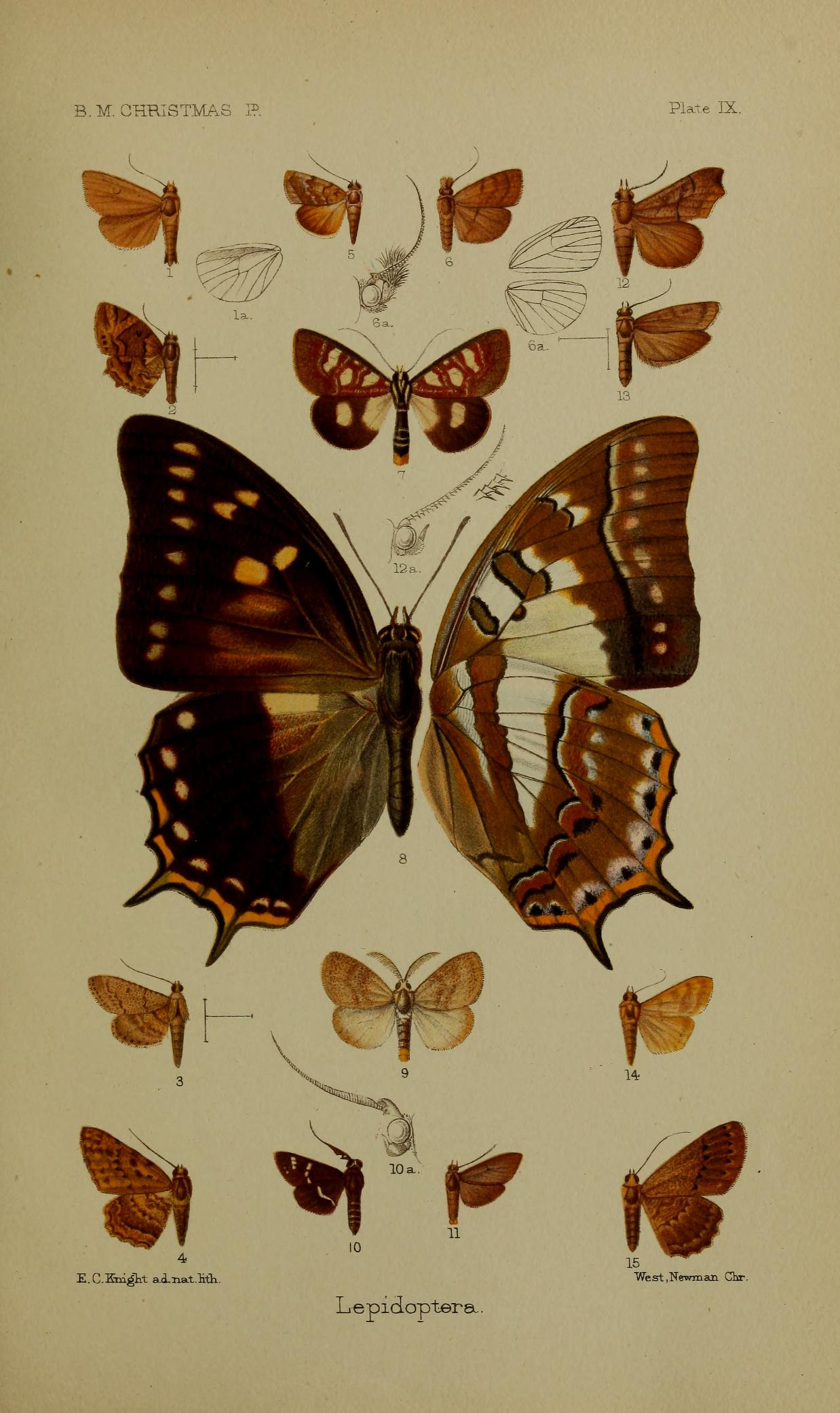
- In Charles William Andrews's A Monograph of Christmas Island
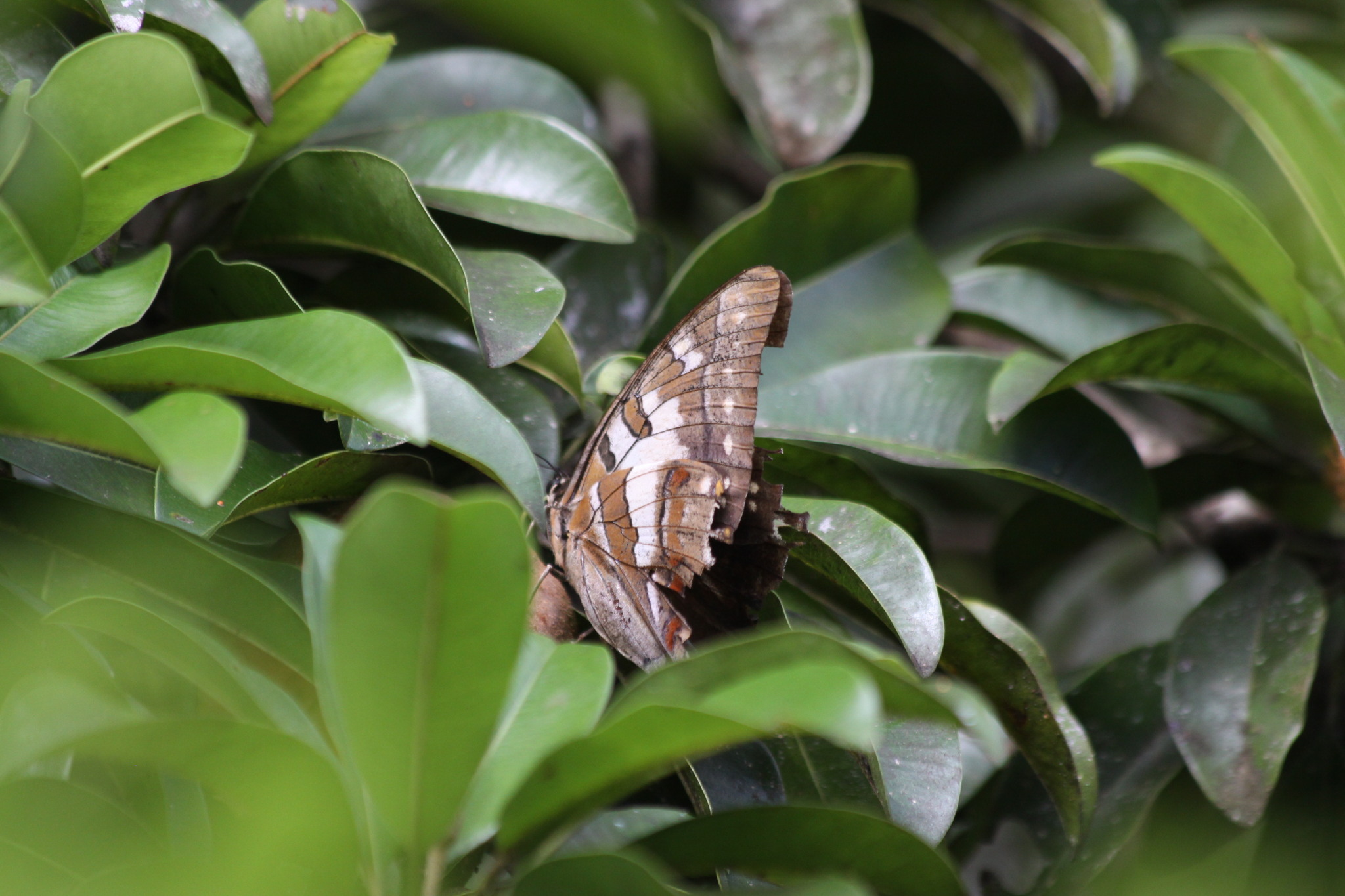

Scientific classification
- Kingdom: Animalia
- Phylum: Arthropoda
- Clade: Pancrustacea
- Class: Insecta
- Order: Lepidoptera
- Family: Nymphalidae
- Genus: Polyura
- Species: P. andrewsi

Binomial name
- Polyura andrewsi (Butler, 1900)

Synonyms
- Polyura andrewsi

= Polyura andrewsi =

Species of butterfly

Polyura andrewsi is a butterfly in the family Nymphalidae. It was described by Arthur Gardiner Butler in 1900. It is endemic to Christmas Island in the Indian Ocean.

The original description reads More nearly related to C. pyrrhus from Amboina than to any other species of the genus, but altogether a far more smoky coloured insect on the upper surface; all the white markings on the primaries of C. pyrrhus are here represented by more or less. buff-coloured spots; the internal patch, bounded above by the second median branch, diffused, and more or less heavily irrorated. with black scales; the secondaries are much darker than in C. pyrrhus, the central whitish band more sharply defined, and almost always abruptly abbreviated, so that it rarely descends. below the second subcostal branch; the greyish-lavender markings of C. pyrrhus entirely wanting; the black outer border extended inwards, so as to cover nearly half the wing-surface; a submarginal ochreous band, broken by grey-greenish streaks, bordering the extremities of the nervures.

The pattern and colouring of the under-surface is much more like that of C. jupiter (from Duke of York Island, the Solomon Islands, and New Guinea); it differs, however, in the slenderness of all the black markings, the much smaller patch across the end of the discoidal cell of the primaries, and the much reduced, or wholly obliterated, patch below the cell; on the secondaries, the red patches are brighter and somewhat broader; the white submarginal spots are bordered externally with bluish-lavender, and the interrupted ochreous band is brighter and better defined; expanse of wings, male 87-92mm., female 106–112 mm.

It is now regarded as a subspecies of Polyura pyrrhus Polyura pyrrhus ssp. andrewsi Butler, 1900.
