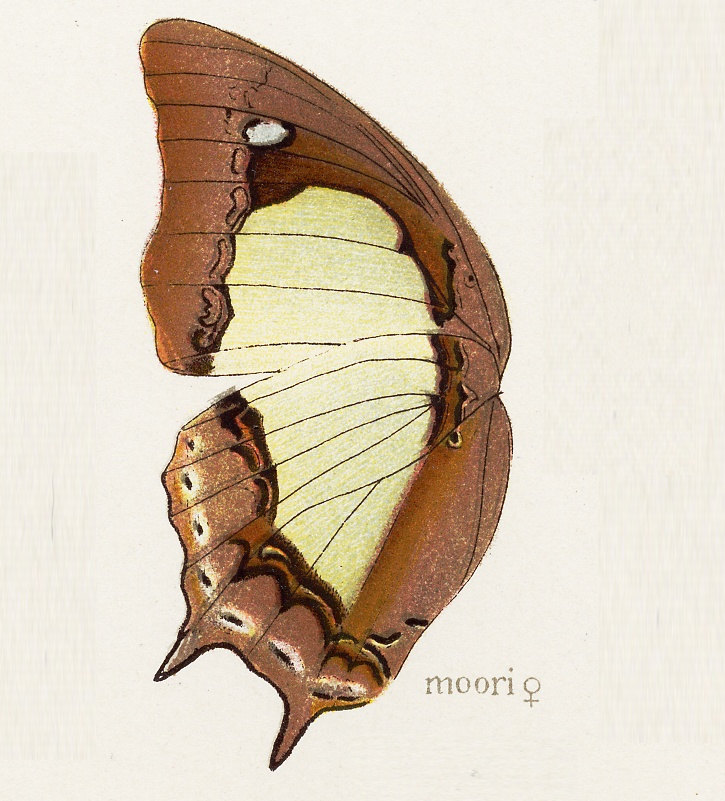
- Underside of female

Scientific classification
- Kingdom: Animalia
- Phylum: Arthropoda
- Class: Insecta
- Order: Lepidoptera
- Family: Nymphalidae
- Genus: Polyura
- Species: P. moori

Binomial name
- Polyura moori (Distant, 1883)

= Polyura moori =

Malayan nawab

Species of butterfly

Polyura moori, the Malayan nawab, is a butterfly found in Asia that belongs to the rajahs and nawabs group (subfamily Charaxinae) of the brush-footed butterflies (family Nymphalidae).

== Description ==
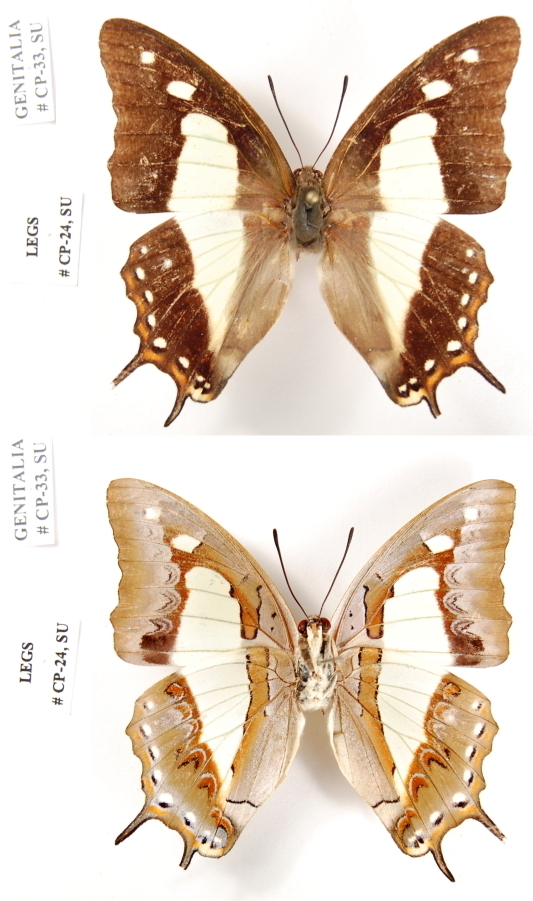

The species closely resembles Polyura jalysus, but differs from jalysus as follows: Upperside: forewing with bluish-white scaling on the outer margin of the discal greenish-white area, the outer broad black area on terminal margin not narrowing posteriorly, margin of nearly equal width at tornus and anteriorly. Hindwing: the blue scaling at base and along middle of outer margin of discal greenish-white area much broader; black along terminal margin irregular, much broader above than in jalysus, narrowing in the middle, where it is subinterrupted by the blue scaling, and widening again between veins 2 and 4; the row of white spots traversing it transverse and larger; the transverse ochraceous series of lunules paler, almost white, and barely indicated between veins 2 and 4. Underside: the discal greenish-white area on both forewing and hindwing narrower than on the upperside, the chocolate-coloured band on forewing curving round parallel to the costa not so well defined on the outer margin as in jalysus, the costal margin beyond it, the base of the wings and the dorsal margin broadly lilacine reddish brown as in Polyura arja, not grey as jalysus, as is also the space between the postdiscal series of lunules and the terminal series of ochraceous markings.

Found in north-eastern India, Burma, the Malay Peninsula, and Indochina. Wingspan 74–82 mm.

== See also ==
- List of butterflies of India
- List of butterflies of India (Nymphalidae)
