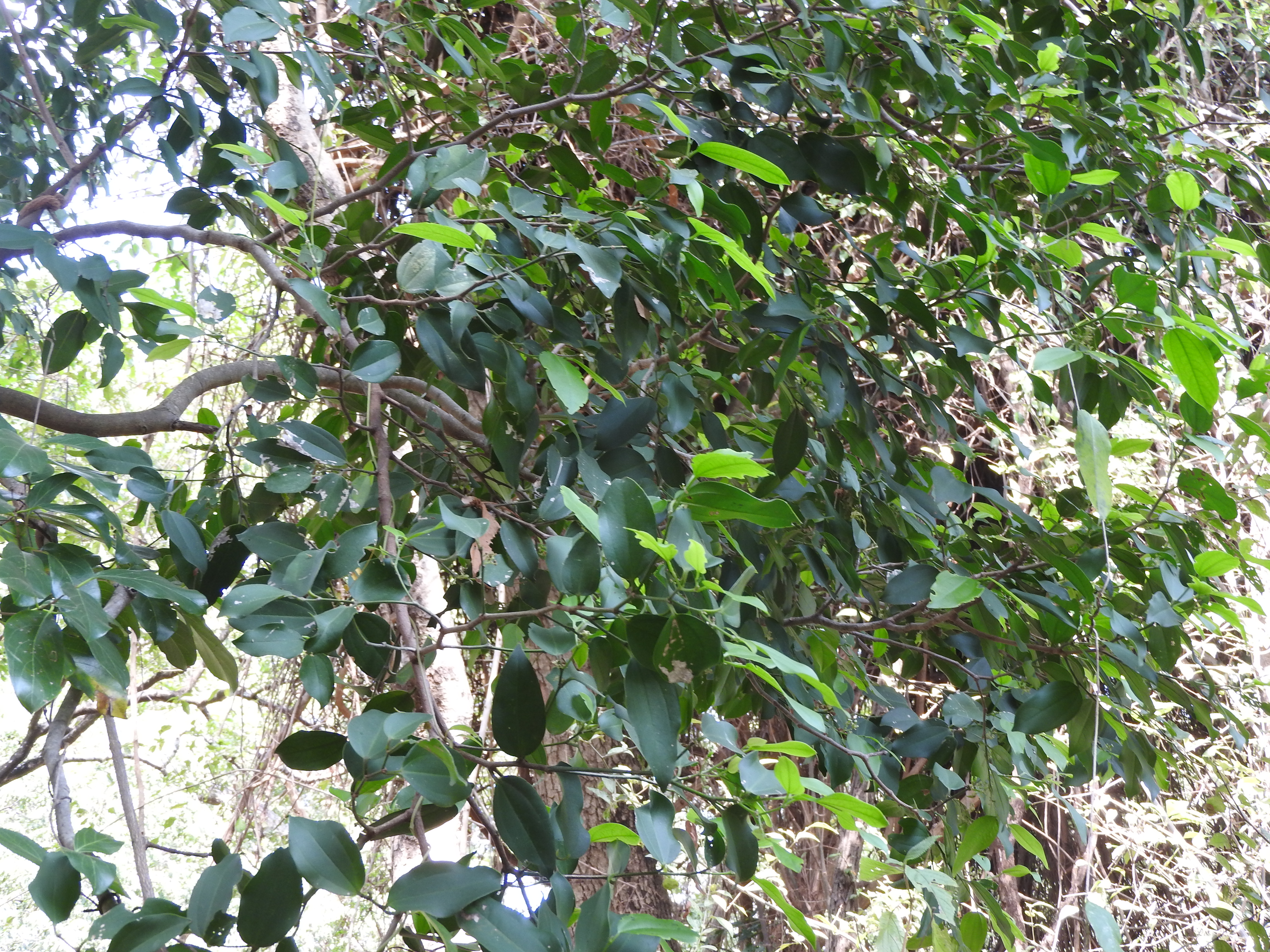

Conservation status
- Least Concern (IUCN 3.1)

Scientific classification
- Kingdom: Plantae
- Clade: Embryophytes
- Clade: Tracheophytes
- Clade: Spermatophytes
- Clade: Angiosperms
- Clade: Eudicots
- Clade: Rosids
- Order: Rosales
- Family: Cannabaceae
- Genus: Celtis
- Species: C. philippensis

Binomial name
- Celtis philippensis Blanco (1837)

Synonyms
- List: Bosea trinervia Roxb. (1824); Celtis brevinervis (Blume) Planch. (1873); Celtis collinsiae Craib (1918); Celtis djungiel (Blume) Planch. (1873); Celtis hasseltii (Blume) Planch. (1873); Celtis laurifolia (Blume) Planch. (1873); Celtis mindanaensis Elmer (1915); Celtis multifolia Elmer ex Merr. (1923) pro syn.; Celtis philippensis var. consimilis J.-F.Leroy (1948); Celtis philippensis var. wightii (Planch.) Soepadmo (1977); Celtis trinervia (Roxb.) Koord. (1912) nom. illeg.; Celtis wightii Planch. (1848); Celtis wightii var. consimilis (Blume) Gagnep. (1928); Solenostigma brevinerve Blume (1856); Solenostigma consimile Blume (1856); Solenostigma djungiel Blume (1856); Solenostigma hasseltii Blume (1856); Solenostigma laurifolium Blume (1856); Solenostigma wightii Blume (1856); Solenostigma philippinensis (Blanco) Blume (1856)

= Celtis philippensis =

Species of flowering plant

Celtis philippensis is an Asian species of flowering plant in the family Cannabaceae. It is a tree which can grow up to 30 metres (98 ft) tall. It ranges from India and Sri Lanka to southern China and Taiwan, the Philippines, New Guinea and the Solomon Islands, and northern Australia.

It grows in tropical and subtropical forests, including moist evergreen forests, monsoon forests, and littoral forests, from sea level up to 1,400 metres (4,600 ft) elevation.

It Australia it is an important food plant for larvae of the common aeroplane (Phaedyma shepherdi) and tailed emperor (Polyura sempronius) butterflies.

== In culture ==
Known as medithella (මැදිතෙල්ල) in Sinhala.

== Sources ==
- http://www.theplantlist.org/tpl1.1/record/kew-2708529
- http://www.theplantlist.org/tpl1.1/record/kew-2708413
- http://www.biotik.org/india/species/c/celtphwi/celtphwi_en.html
- http://www.efloras.org/florataxon.aspx?flora_id=2&taxon_id=242311733
