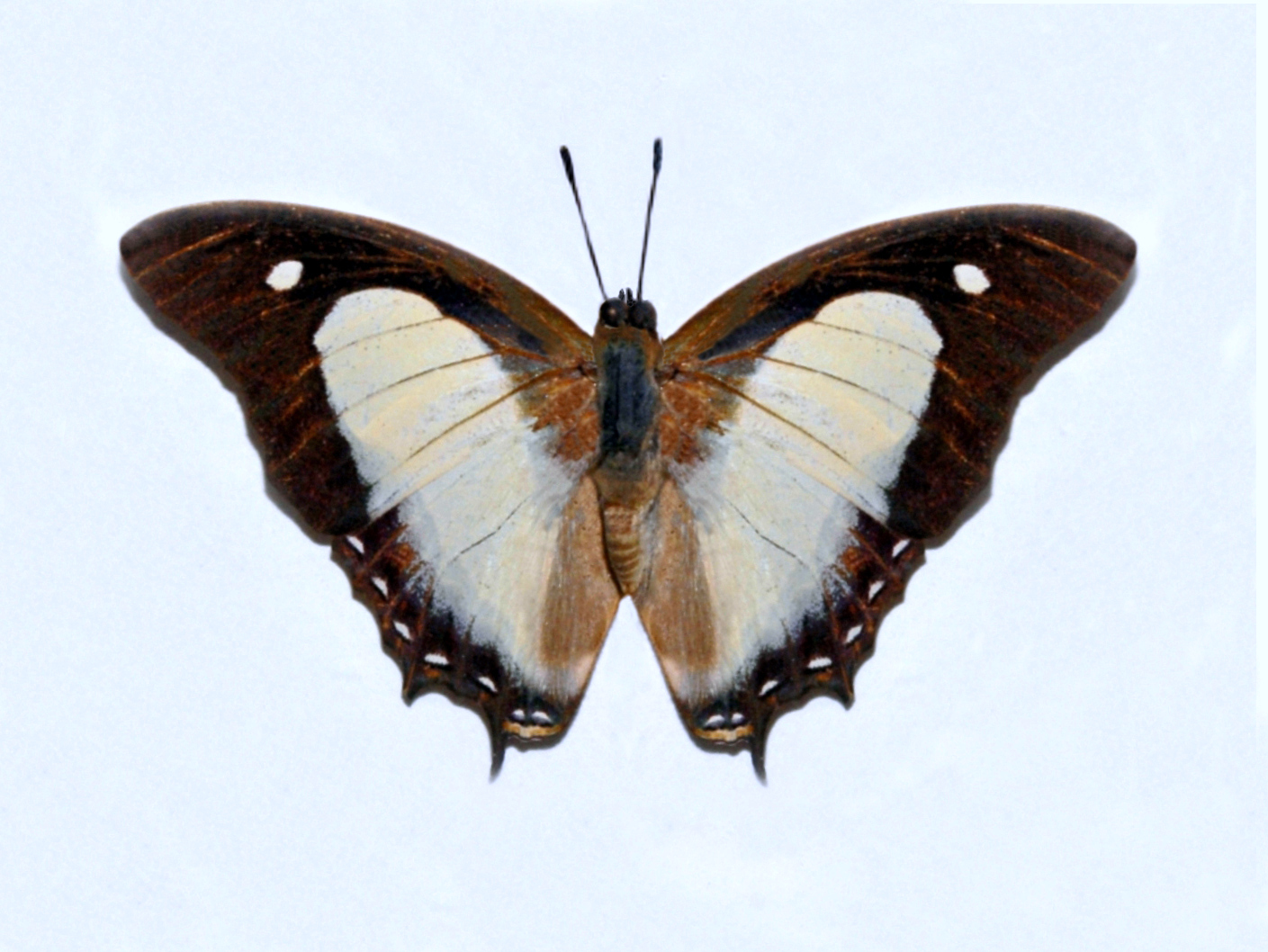
- Dorsal view of P. h. fallax from Java
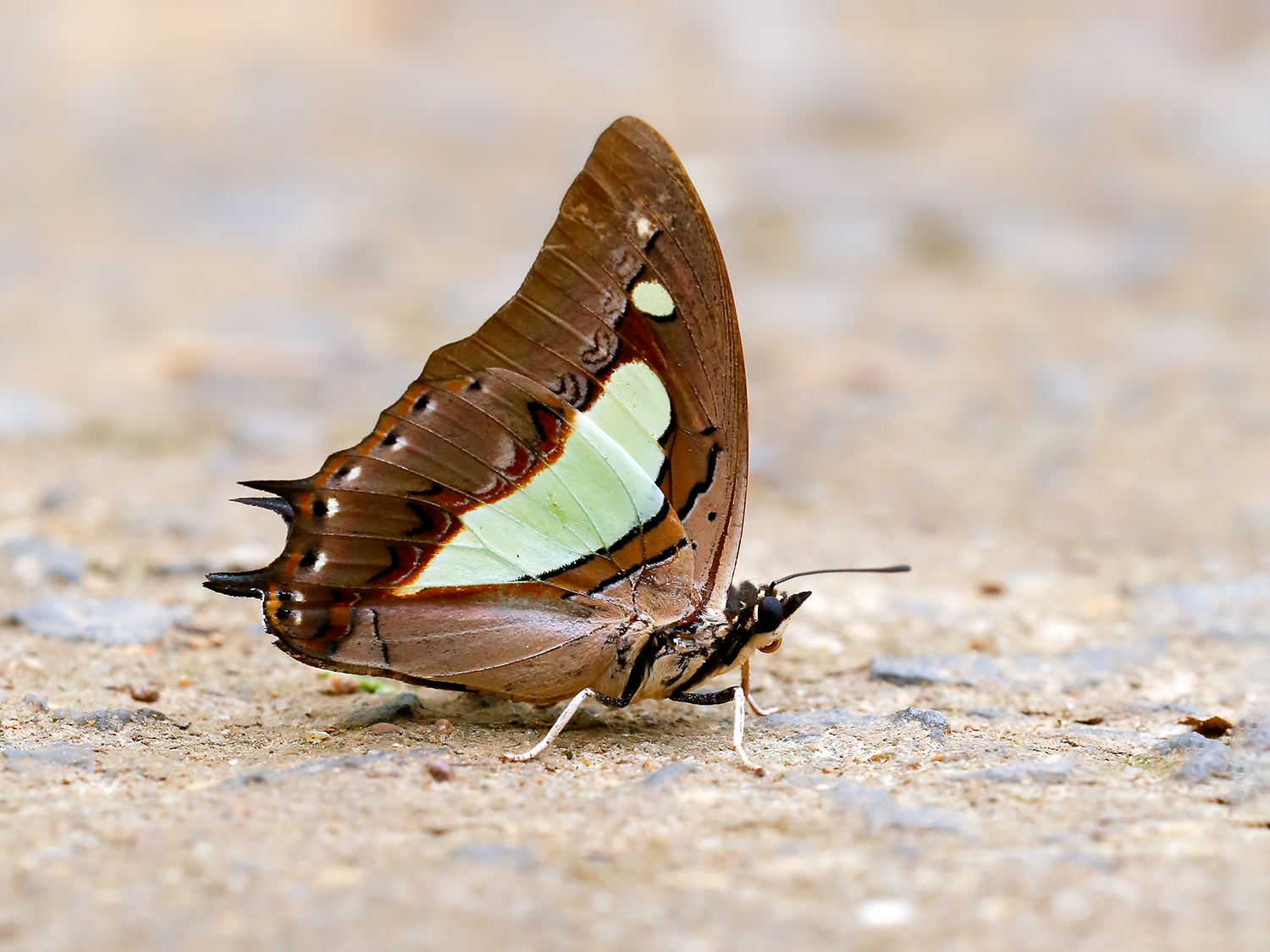

Scientific classification
- Domain: Eukaryota
- Kingdom: Animalia
- Phylum: Arthropoda
- Class: Insecta
- Order: Lepidoptera
- Family: Nymphalidae
- Genus: Polyura
- Species: P. hebe

Binomial name
- Polyura hebe (Butler, 1866)

Synonyms
- Charaxes hebe (Butler, 1866); Eulepis hebe Rothschild & Jordan, 1898; Polyura hebe Smiles, 1982; Charaxes albanus Röber, 1895; Charaxes ganymedes Staudinger, 1886; Charaxes fallax Röber, 1894; Eulepis smerdis Moore, [1896]; Charaxes fallacides Fruhstorfer, 1895; Charaxes plautus Fruhstorfer, 1898; Eriboea falculus Fruhstorfer, 1914; Charaxes attalus chersonesus Fruhstorfer, 1898; Charaxes attalus lombokianus Fruhstorfer, 1898; Eulepis hebe arnoldi Rothschild, 1899; Eulepis hebe kangeanus Fruhstorfer, 1903; Eulepis hebe baweanicus Fruhstorfer, 1906; Eriboea hebe nikias Fruhstorfer, 1914; Eriboea hebe clavata van Eecke, 1918

= Polyura hebe =

Species of butterfly

Polyura hebe, the plain nawab, is a butterfly belonging to the brush-footed butterflies family (Nymphalidae).

== Subspecies ==
- P. h. hebe (Butler, 1866) – Sumatra
- P. h. ganymedes (Staudinger, 1886) – Borneo
- P. h. fallax (Röber, 1894) – Java
- P. h. fallacides (Fruhstorfer, 1895) – Nias
- P. h. plautus (Fruhstorfer, 1898) – Singapore
- P. h. chersonesus (Fruhstorfer, 1898) – Peninsular Malaya, Thailand, Burma
- P. h. lombokianus (Fruhstorfer, 1898) – Lombok
- P. h. arnoldi (Rothschild, 1899) – Sumba
- P. h. kangeanus (Fruhstorfer, 1903) – Kangean Island
- P. h. baweanicus (Fruhstorfer, 1906) – Bawean
- P. h. nikias (Fruhstorfer, 1914) – Bali
- P. h. clavata (van Eecke, 1918) – Simeulue
- P. h. quaesita Corbet, 1942 – Sipora Island
- P. h. takizawai Hanafusa, 1987

== Description ==
Polyura hebe has a wingspan of about 65 millimetres (2.6 in). In these medium-sized, heavy-bodies butterflies the outer edge of the forewings is concave, with a pointed apex and the hindwings show two short tails. The upperside of the wings is greenish white. A broad dark brown apical border, wide at the apex, but decreasing in width towards the base of the costa, forms a wide internal greenish-white band. Also the hindwings show a broad dark brown border, with submarginal small white marks. The underside is brown and has a wide pale silvery-green median patch. The caterpillar is bright green and has a black four-horned head. Seitz - A species with many forms, inhabiting the whole of Macromalayana and parts of Micromalayana. hebe is especially beneath easily distinguishable from moori by the greenish median band being very much narrowed especially on the hindwings. The upper surface is characterized by the uniform black marginal zone of the hindwings, being never interrupted by yellow or greenish median marginal decorations as in moori.— Seitz op. cit. gives an account of the numerous forms.

== Biology ==
Larva feeds on several plant of the family Leguminosae, sub-family Mimosoideae, mainly red saga (Adenanthera pavonina), Albizia falcata, Falcataria moluccana, and petai (Parkia speciosa).

== Distribution ==
This species can be found in Burma, Malaysia, Thailand, Singapore, Java, Sumatra, Bali, and Borneo.
