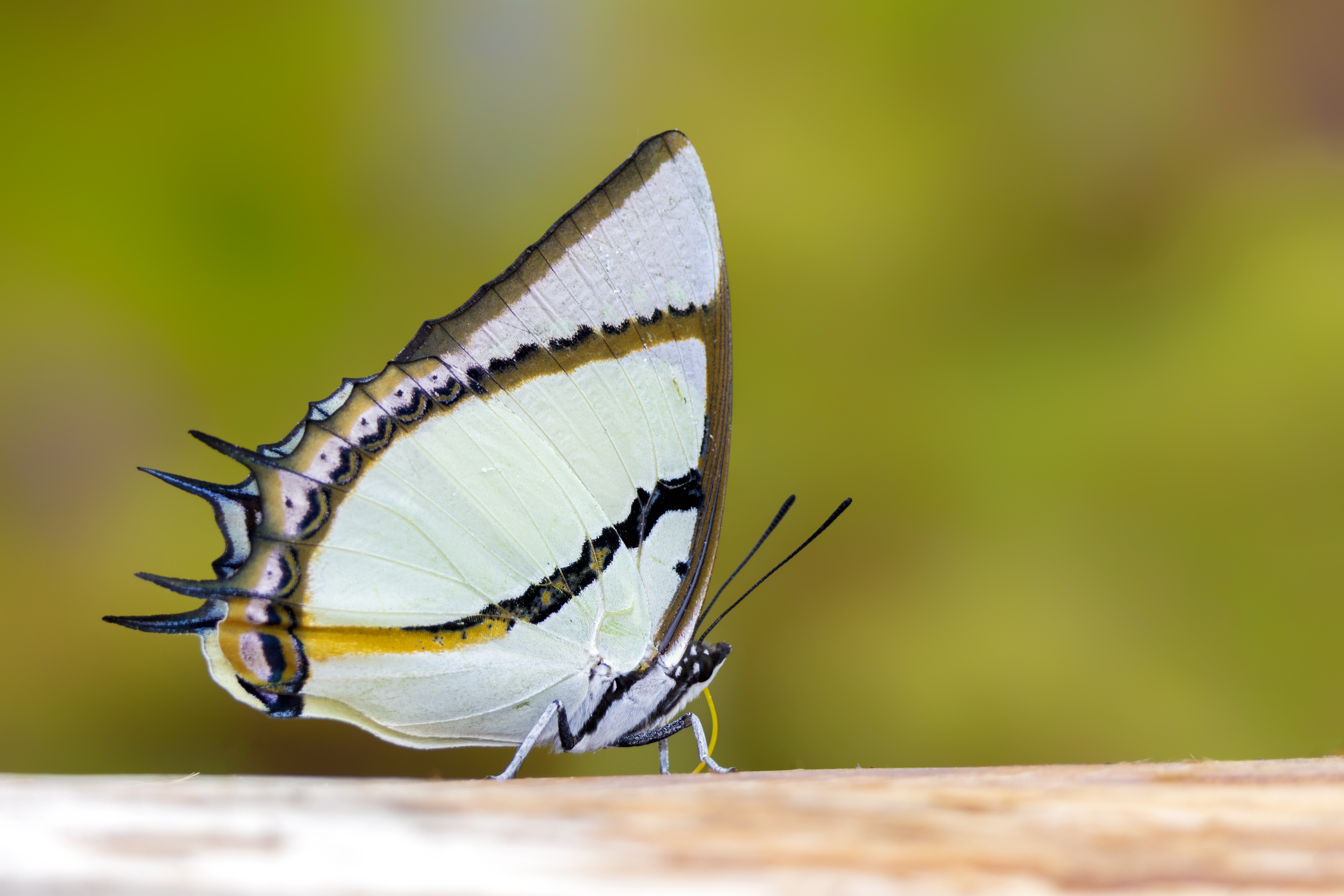

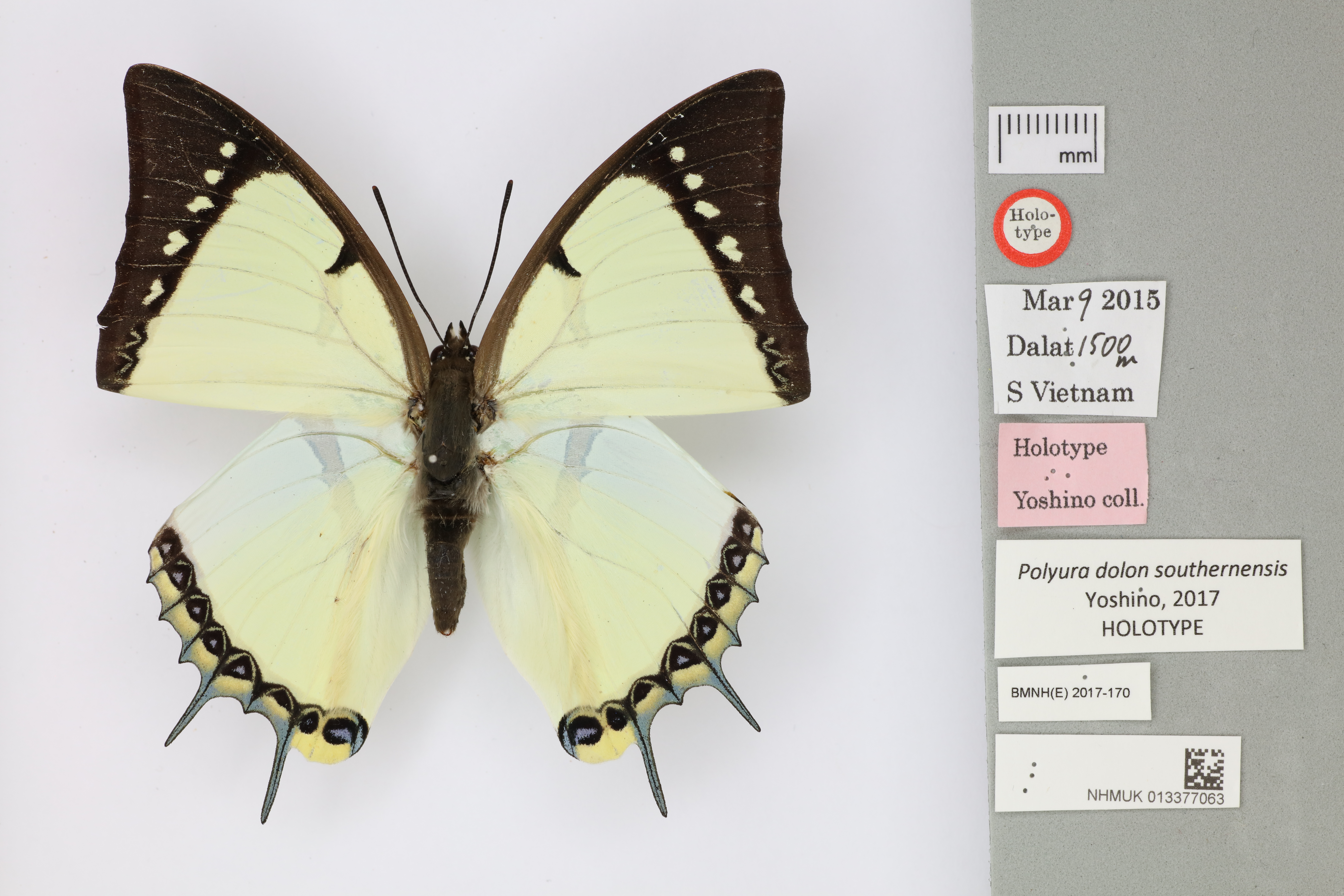

Scientific classification
- Kingdom: Animalia
- Phylum: Arthropoda
- Clade: Pancrustacea
- Class: Insecta
- Order: Lepidoptera
- Family: Nymphalidae
- Subfamily: Charaxinae
- Tribe: Charaxini
- Genus: Polyura
- Species: P. dolon

Binomial name
- Polyura dolon (Westwood, 1848)

Synonyms
- Eriboea dolon Charaxes dolon

= Polyura dolon =

Stately nawab

Species of butterfly

Polyura dolon, the stately nawab or stately rajah (because it was formerly placed in Charaxes), is a butterfly found in the Indomalayan realm belonging to the rajahs and nawabs group, that is, the Charaxinae group of the brush-footed butterflies family.

== Subspecies ==
- Polyura dolon dolon present in India and Nepal.
- Polyura dolon carolus (Fruhstorfer, 1904) present in Tibet and Burma.
- Polyura dolon centralis Rothschild, 1899 present in Sikkim
- Polyura dolon grandis (Rothschild, 1899) present in Laos, Burma, Vietnam and Thailand
- Polyura dolon magniplagus (Fruhstorfer, 1914) present in Assam
- Polyura dolon southernensis present in Vietnam

== Description ==
Polyura dolonis a large butterfly with concave outer edges and hindwings with two slender tails. The upper side is creamy white, widely marked with brown on the forewings, the costal margin and the apex of the 1/3 of the costal margin at the inner angle inclusive, with a line of white dots. The hindwings are only decorated with submarginal taches and lunules. The reverse is white with brown lines, costal marginal and from the inner angle to the costal margin on the forewings, curved from the costal edge to the outer edge near the angle and submarginal on the hindwings.

== Distribution ==
Polyura dolon is found in Nepal, Tibet, India, western China, Laos, Burma, and Thailand.

== See also ==
- Charaxinae
- Nymphalidae
- List of butterflies of India
- List of butterflies of India (Nymphalidae)
