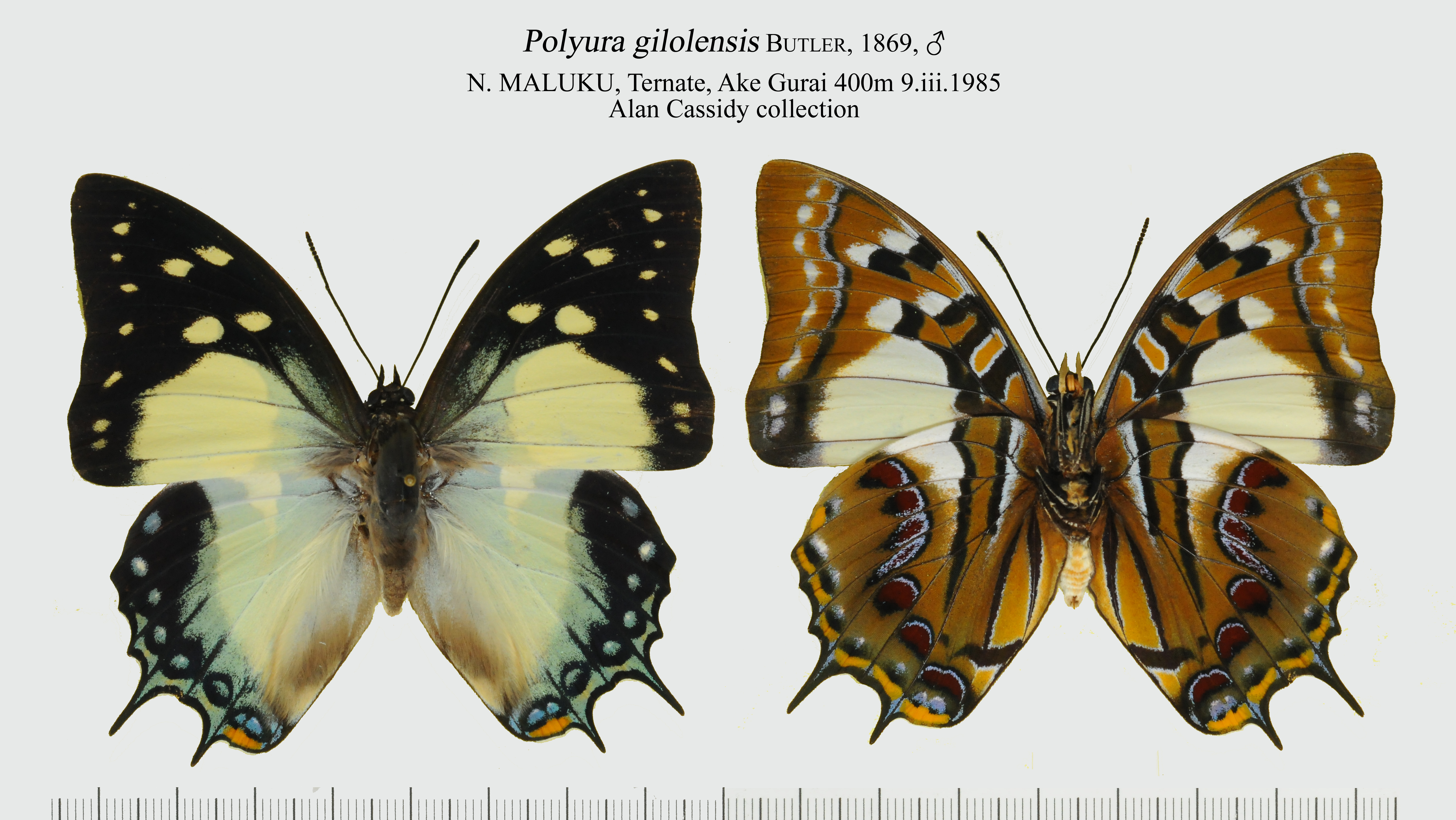

Scientific classification
- Kingdom: Animalia
- Phylum: Arthropoda
- Class: Insecta
- Order: Lepidoptera
- Family: Nymphalidae
- Genus: Charaxes
- Species: C. gilolensis

Binomial name
- Charaxes gilolensis (Butler, 1869)

Synonyms
- Polyura gilolensis; Eulepis pyrrhus obiensis Rothschild, 1898; Eulepis pyrrhus buruanus Rothschild, 1898

= Polyura gilolensis =

Species of butterfly

Charaxes (Polyura) gilolensis is a butterfly in the family Nymphalidae. It was described by Arthur Gardiner Butler in 1869. It is endemic to the Moluccas in Indonesia.

Hans Frustorfer wrote "gilolensis Btlr. lies before me in corresponding males from Batjan and Halmaheira. Cell of the forewings, contrary to obiensis and pyrrhus, dusted greenish in its distal part. Marginal area of the hindwings less broad than in the Amboina-race. Female very rare". He considered it a form of pyrrhus.

== Subspecies ==
- C. g. gilolensis (Batjan, Halmahera)
- C. g. obiensis (Rothschild, 1898) (Obi Island)
- C. g. buruana (Rothschild, 1898) (Buru Island)
