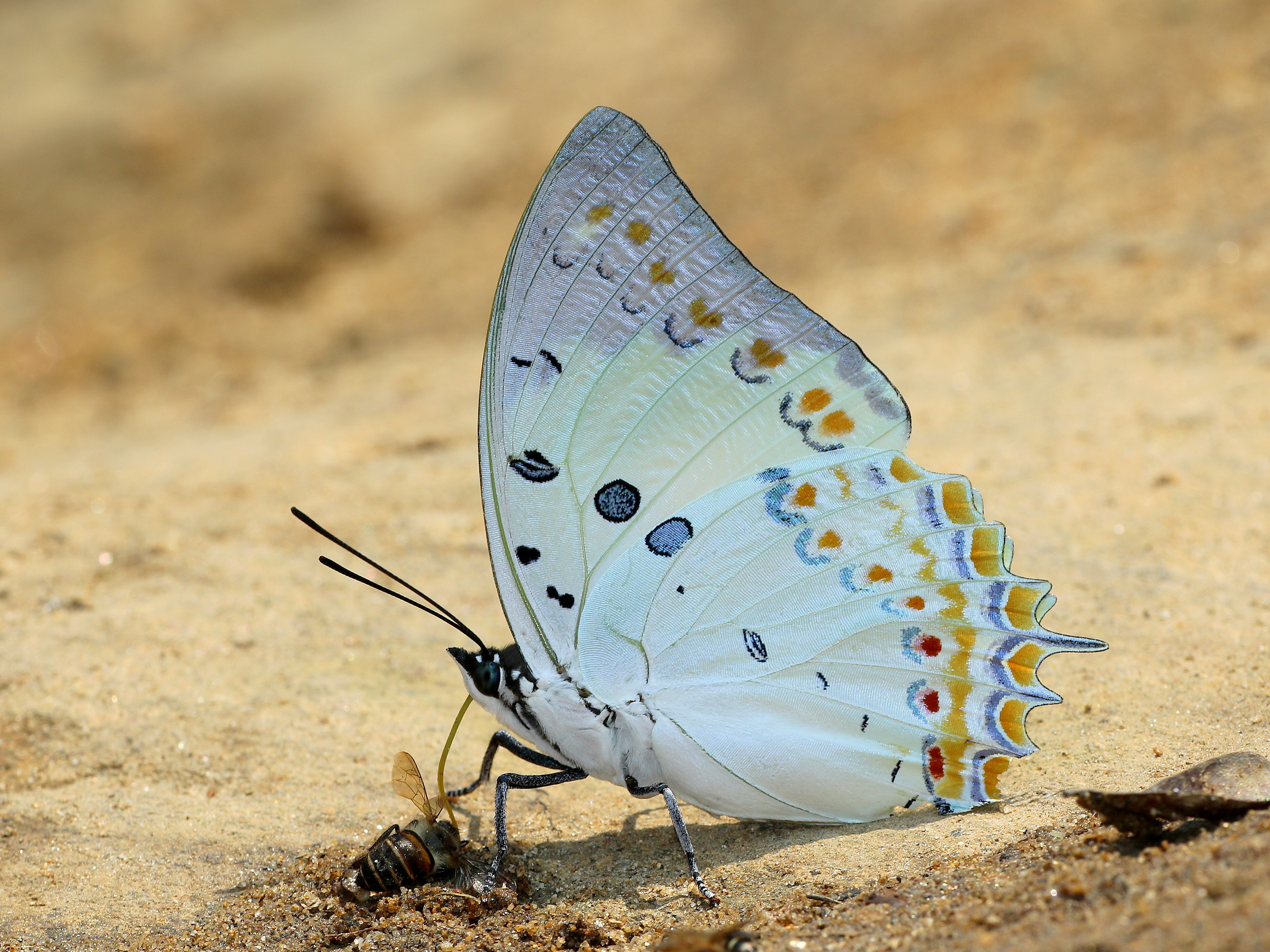

Scientific classification
- Kingdom: Animalia
- Phylum: Arthropoda
- Clade: Pancrustacea
- Class: Insecta
- Order: Lepidoptera
- Family: Nymphalidae
- Genus: Polyura
- Species: P. delphis

Binomial name
- Polyura delphis (Doubleday, 1843)

= Polyura delphis =

Jewelled nawab

Species of butterfly

Polyura delphis, the jewelled nawab, is a butterfly found in India and Southeast Asia that belongs to the rajahs and nawabs group, that is, the Charaxinae subfamily of the brush-footed butterflies family. The front wings have a concave outer edge and hind wings bear two tails.The upperside is white, largely marked with brown at the apex of the forewings. The reverse is metallic white decorated with yellow chevron lines and red marks. The wingspan is about 2.75 inches (70 mm).

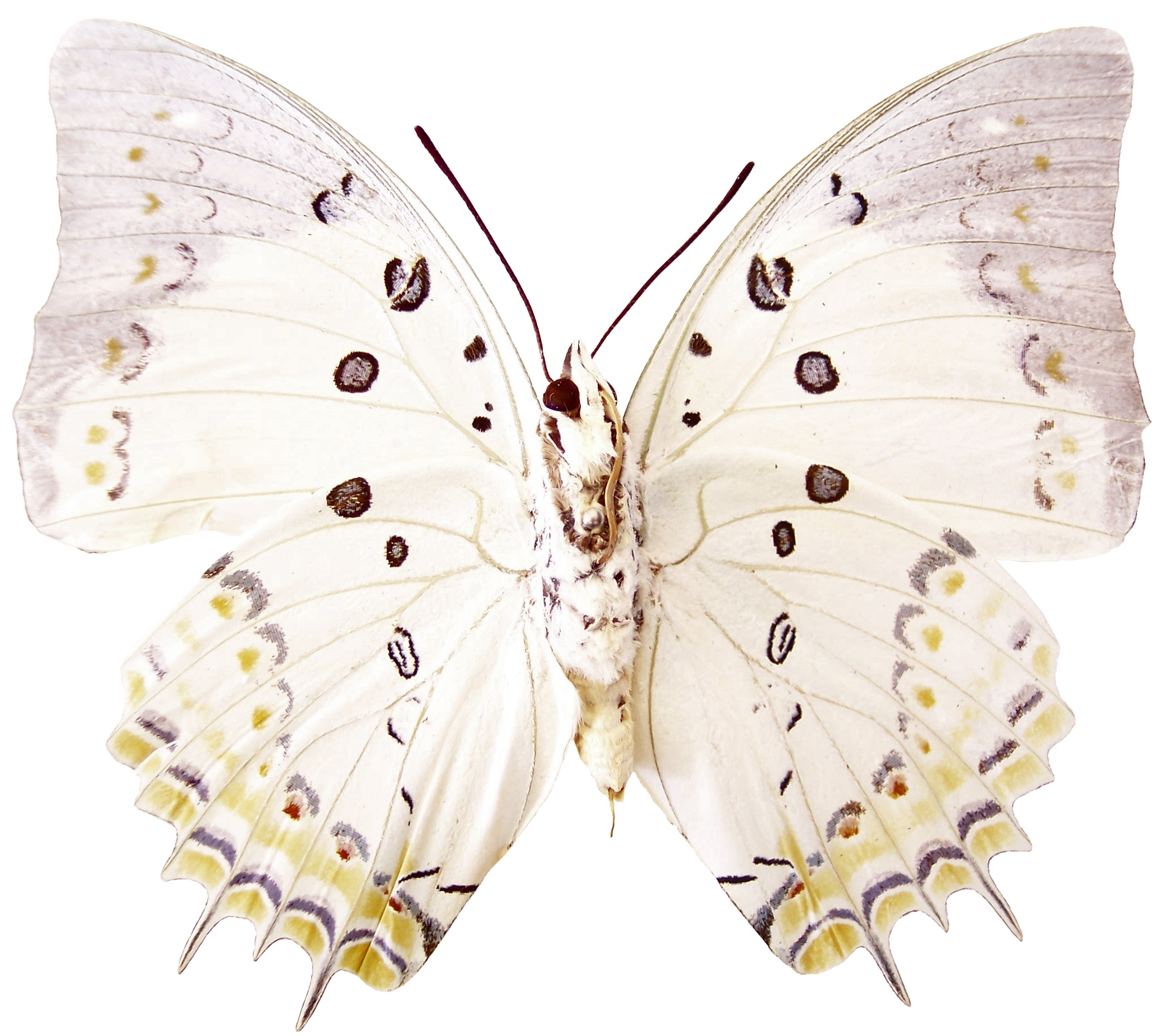
Ventral side

== Technical description and variation ==
E. delphis, a predominantly Macromalayan species, advances to the north as far as Assam. — delphis delphis. Dbl., the name-type, originates from Silhet. Male very similar to concha (134 c), but the subapical spot is, as a rule, more distinctly pronounced and the black apical margin of the forewings proximally more distinctly dentate and decidedly narrower than in concha. The under surface distinguishable from that of delphis delphinion (134 c) only by somewhat finer blue discal lunular spots. A female from Tenasserim deviates from the male only by the more imposing light ochre-yellow submarginal band of the under surface of the hindwings. It seems to fly all the year through, although the butterflies are always rare. Specimens which I collected near Bangkok in the dry period, are smaller than those from Tenasserim and exhibit above a darker greenish lustre. Pavie also observed delphis near Bangkok. -— concha Voll. (134 c) which I have at hand in numbers from West Sumatra, the surroundings of Padang Pandjang, considerably excels in size all the vicarious types. Apical macula of the forewings either very small or absent. The posterior submarginal lunae of the upper surface of the hindwings unnoticeably filled with white. The anterior tail longer than in delphis. Female still unknown; the males never common, preferring wet places on roads through the woods and on river-crossings, often in the midst of swarms of Pierides and Pap. antiphates. — othonis Fruhst. resembles concha above, but it also remains smaller; the black apical margin somewhat narrower. Under surface characterized by a very broad greenish-ochreous submarginal band extending distally to the very slender light blue anteterminal streaks, appearing thus still broader than in the female described above from Tenasserim. A female in the Coll. Adams in the British Museum is superior to the male in size, and at the same time the yellow band so characteristic of othonis appears as a twice as broad submarginal band, compared to the male:Island of Nias, very . rare. — cygnus R. and J., an excellent race the most nearly allied to delphis from Assam by its habitus and by the mostly large apical spot of the male forewings. Under surface distinguished by the smaller blue circles and the indistinct, more greenish than ochreous bands of the hindwings. East and West Java, very rare. The female lying before me in one specimen from the promontory of the Tengger Mountains in East Java, together with another female in the Adams-Collection captured by myself in East Java, form the only specimens known.Female about one third larger than the males, under surface of hindwings with somewhat more distinct, yellowish-green bands. - delphinion Fruhst. is smaller, more intensely yellow than concha, with more blurred black and green sub¬ marginal lunae on the upper surface of the hindwings. The tails are shorter, the yellow bands of the under surface darker. North and South Borneo. — niveus R. and J.. has a still more receding black apical margin than delphinion and beneath narrower, but darker ochreous longitudinal bands of the hindwings. Very rare; Island of Palawan.

== Subspecies ==
- Polyura delphis delphis Sikkim, Assam, Thailand
- Polyura delphis concha (Vollenhoeven, 1861) Peninsular Malaya, Sumatra
- Polyura delphis cygnus (Rothschild, 1899) Java
- Polyura delphis delphinion (Fruhstorfer, 1904) Palawan
- Polyura delphis niveus (Rothschild, 1899) Borneo
- Polyura delphis othonis (Fruhstorfer, 1904) Nias

== See also ==
- List of butterflies of India
- List of butterflies of India (Nymphalidae)
