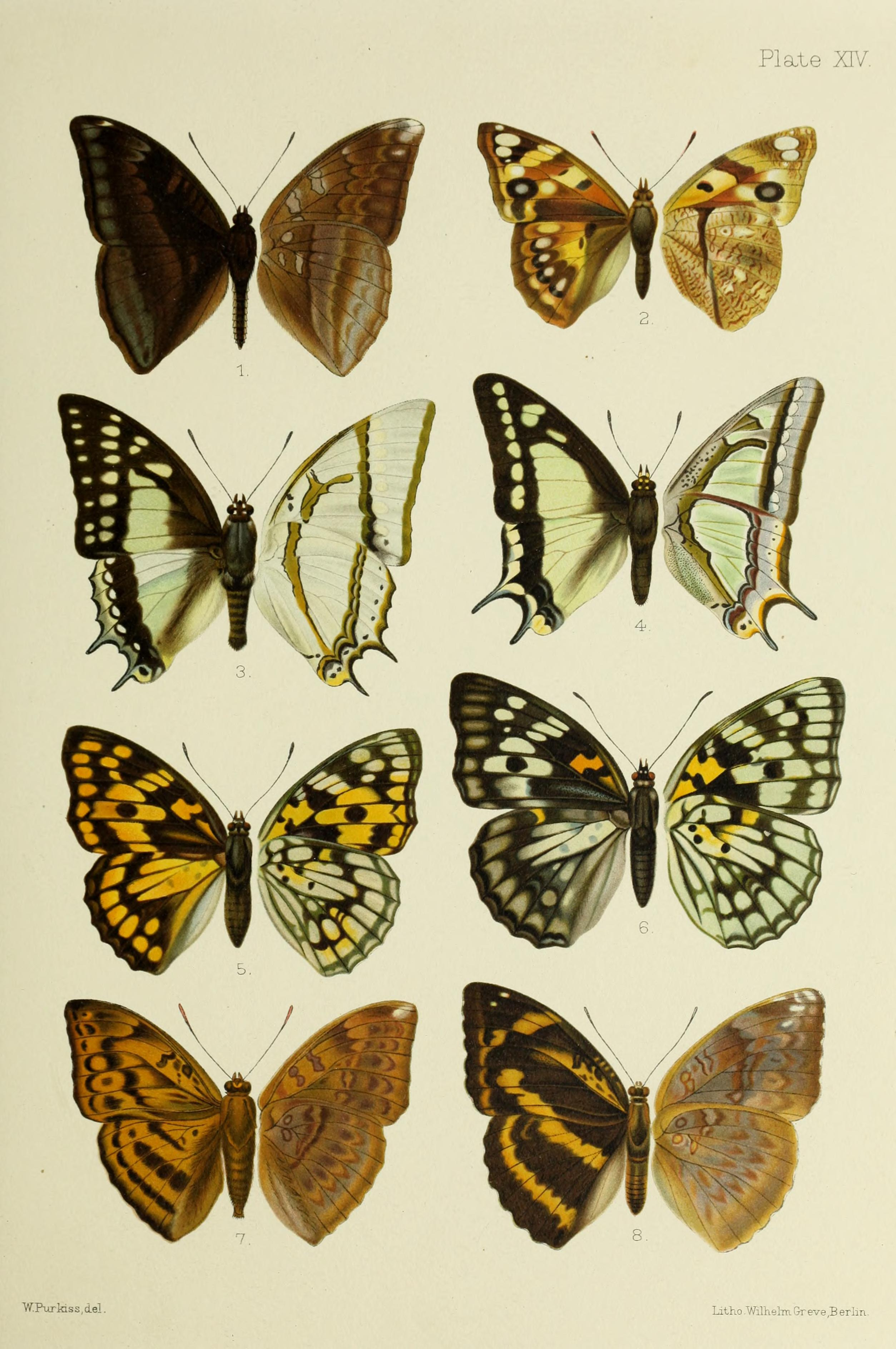
- Polyura posidonius in Leech Butterflies from China, Japan, and Corea (figure 4, male)

Scientific classification
- Domain: Eukaryota
- Kingdom: Animalia
- Phylum: Arthropoda
- Class: Insecta
- Order: Lepidoptera
- Family: Nymphalidae
- Subfamily: Charaxinae
- Tribe: Charaxini
- Genus: Polyura
- Species: P. posidonius

Binomial name
- Polyura posidonius Leech, 1891

Synonyms
- Charaxes posidonius Leech, 1891; Charaxes (Polyura) posidonius; Charaxes clitiphon Oberthür, 1891

= Polyura posidonius =

Species of butterfly

Polyura posidonius is a butterfly in the family Nymphalidae. It was described by Leech in 1891. It is found in Tibet and western China.
