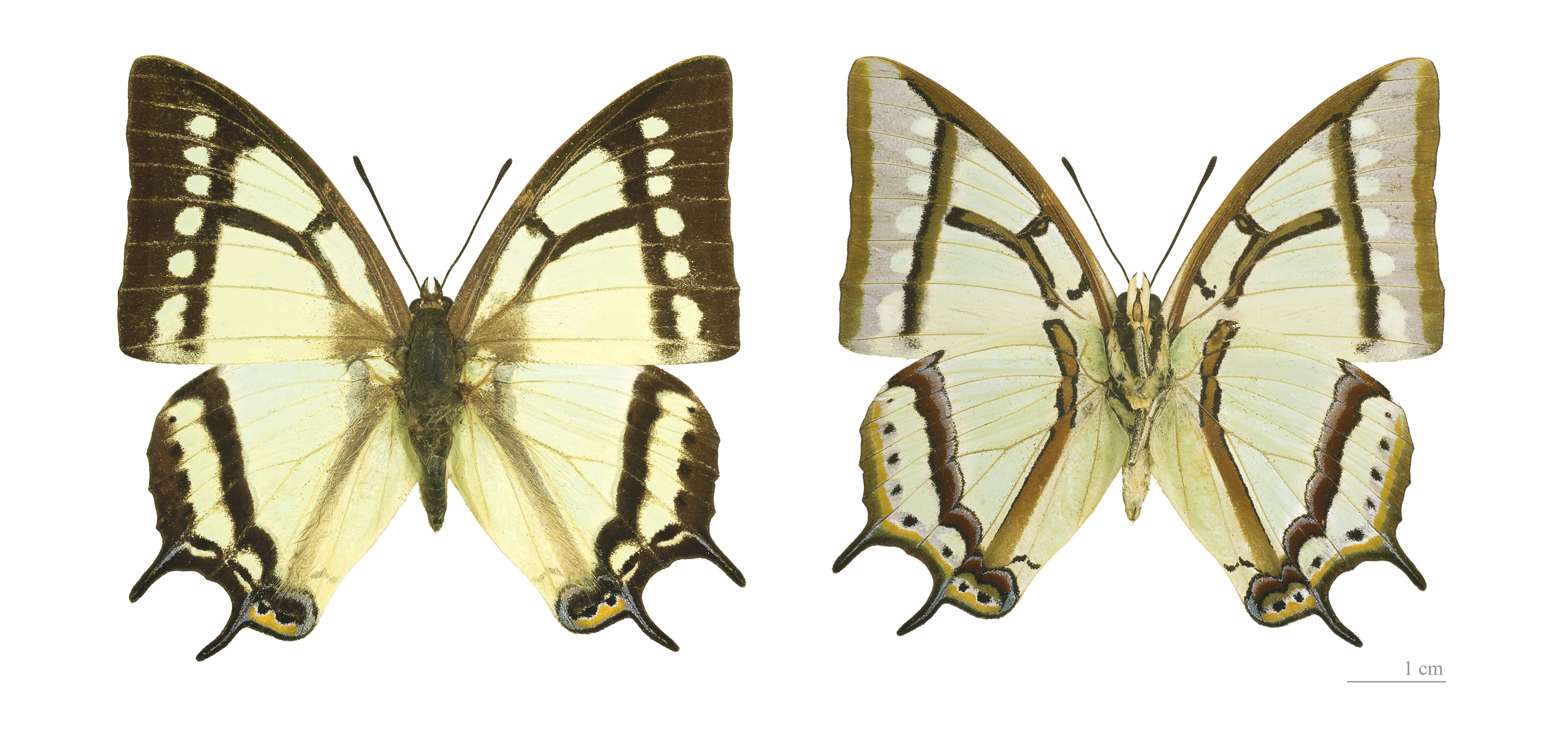

Scientific classification
- Kingdom: Animalia
- Phylum: Arthropoda
- Class: Insecta
- Order: Lepidoptera
- Family: Nymphalidae
- Subfamily: Charaxinae
- Tribe: Charaxini
- Genus: Polyura
- Species: P. narcaeus

Binomial name
- Polyura narcaeus (Hewitson, 1854)

Synonyms
- Polyura narcaeus; Nymphalis narcaeus Hewitson, 1854; Charaxes mandarinus C. & R. Felder, [1867]; Charaxes narcaeus var. thibetanus Oberthür, 1891; Charaxes satyrina Oberthür, 1891; Eriboea narcaea f. aemiliani Fernández, 1912; Eriboea narcaeus richthofeni Fruhstorfer, 1915; Eriboea narcaeus richthofeni f. arna Fruhstorfer, 1915; Eriboea narcaea abrupta Röber, 1925; Eriboea narcaea acuminata Lathy, 1926; Eriboea narcaea ab. intermedia Lathy, 1926; Eriboea narcaea ab. marginepunctatus Lathy, 1926; Charaxes satyrina menedemus Oberthür, 1891; Eriboea narcaeus meghaduta Fruhstorfer, 1908; Eriboea narcaea var. formosana Moltrecht, 1909; Eriboea narcaea meghaduta ab. pallida Lathy, 1926; Eriboea narcaeea aborica Evans, 1924; Eriboea narcaea thawgawa Tytler, 1940; Eulepis lissainei Tytler, 1914

= Polyura narcaeus =

Species of butterfly

Polyura narcaeus, the China nawab, is a butterfly in the family Nymphalidae. It was described by William Chapman Hewitson in 1854. It is found in the Palearctic and Indomalayan realms.

== Subspecies ==
- P. n. aborica (Evans, 1924) China (Tibet), India (Assam)
- P. n. lissainei (Tytler, 1914) India (Assam), Thailand
- P. n. narcaeus (Hewitson, 1854) China, Myanmar
- P. n. meghaduta (Fruhstorfer, 1908) Taiwan
- P. n. menedemus (Oberthür, 1891) China (Yunnan)
- P. n. thawgawa (Tytler, 1940) China (Yunnan), Myanmar, Vietnam

== Biology ==
The larva feeds on Trema orientalis, Celtis formosana, Pithecellobium lucidum, Prunus phaeosticta.
