= Polyura clitarchus =

- In Hewitson's Illustrations of New Species of Exotic Butterflies

Scientific classification
- Kingdom: Animalia
- Phylum: Arthropoda
- Class: Insecta
- Order: Lepidoptera
- Family: Nymphalidae
- Genus: Charaxes
- Species: C. clitarchus

Binomial name
- Charaxes clitarchus (Hewitson, 1874)

Synonyms
- Polyura clitarchus

Species of butterfly

Charaxes (Polyura) clitarchus is a butterfly in the family Nymphalidae. It was described by William Chapman Hewitson in 1874. It is endemic to New Caledonia and the Loyalty Islands.

== Description ==
Upper surface similar to jupiter, cell in its anterior part, however, with yellow bands. Hindwing with an almost uniform distal margin, exhibiting 3 bluish-green bands the middle one of which consists of isolated maculae, the proximal one being incomplete. Under surface distinguished by the dark brown basal region being sharply defined and advancing as far as to the end of the cell. The yellowish-white median band extended as far as to the posterior margin, distally deco¬rated by a compact undulate series of brown crescents. Terminal margin like in sempronius. Female similar to the male but larger. Rare in the collections. New Caledonia and Lifu in the Loyalty Islands'
