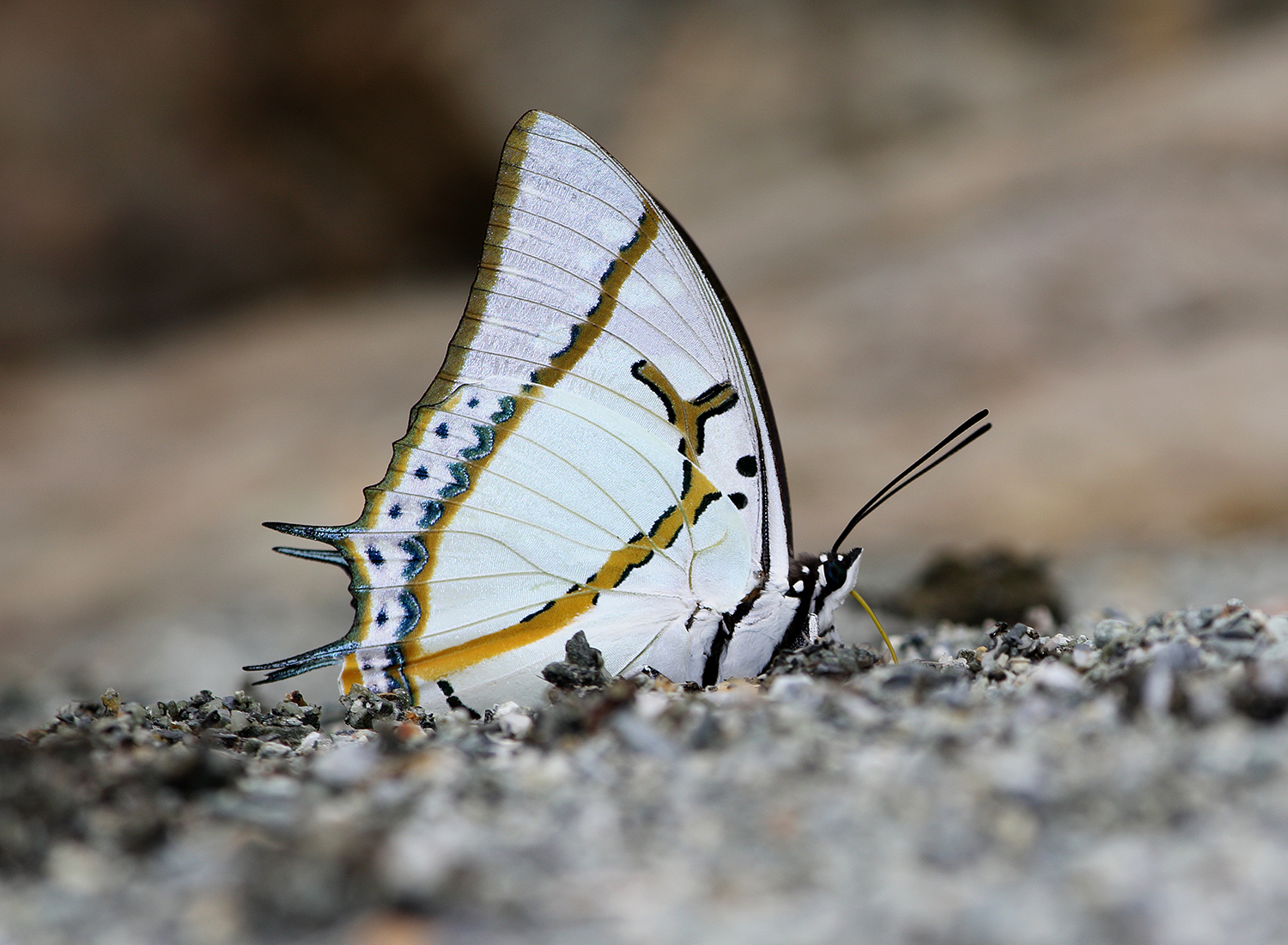
- Ventral View
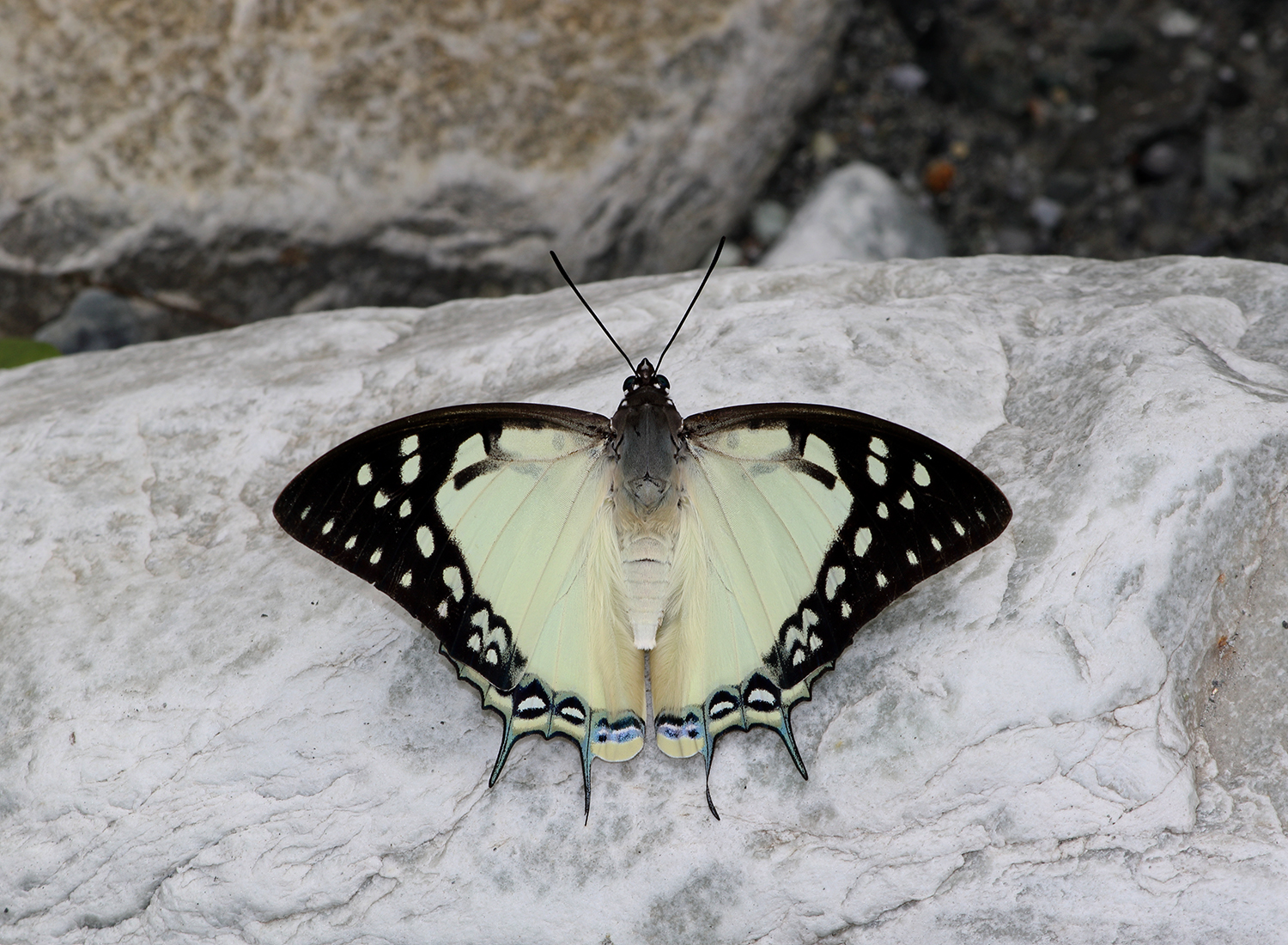
- Dorsal View

Scientific classification
- Kingdom: Animalia
- Phylum: Arthropoda
- Clade: Pancrustacea
- Class: Insecta
- Order: Lepidoptera
- Family: Nymphalidae
- Genus: Polyura
- Species: P. eudamippus

Binomial name
- Polyura eudamippus (Doubleday, 1843)

Synonyms
- Charaxes eudamippus Doubleday, 1843

= Polyura eudamippus =

Great nawab

Species of butterfly

Polyura eudamippus, the great nawab, is a butterfly found in India and the Indomalayan realm that belongs to the rajahs and nawabs group (subfamily Charaxinae) of the brush-footed butterflies (family Nymphalidae).

== Subspecies ==
Listed alphabetically:

- P. e. eudamippus (Nepal, Sikkim, Assam - Manipur)
- P. e. cupidinius (Fruhstorfer, 1914) (Yunnan)
- P. e. formosanus (Rothschild, 1899) (Taiwan)
- P. e. jamblichus (Fruhstorfer, 1914) South Burma (Tenasserim)
- P. e. kuangtungensis (Mell, 1923) (Guangdong)
- P. e. nigrobasalis (Lathy, 1898) (Burma, Thailand - Indo China, South Yunnan)
- P. e. peninsularis (Pendlebury, 1933) (Peninsular Malaya)
- P. e. rothschildi (Leech, 1893) (West China)
- P. e. splendens (Tytler, 1940) (Yunnan)
- P. e. whiteheadi (Crowley, 1900) (Hainan)

Note P. e. weismanni (Fritze, 1894) (Okinawa) is a distinct species per study by Toussaint et al. 2015

== Description ==
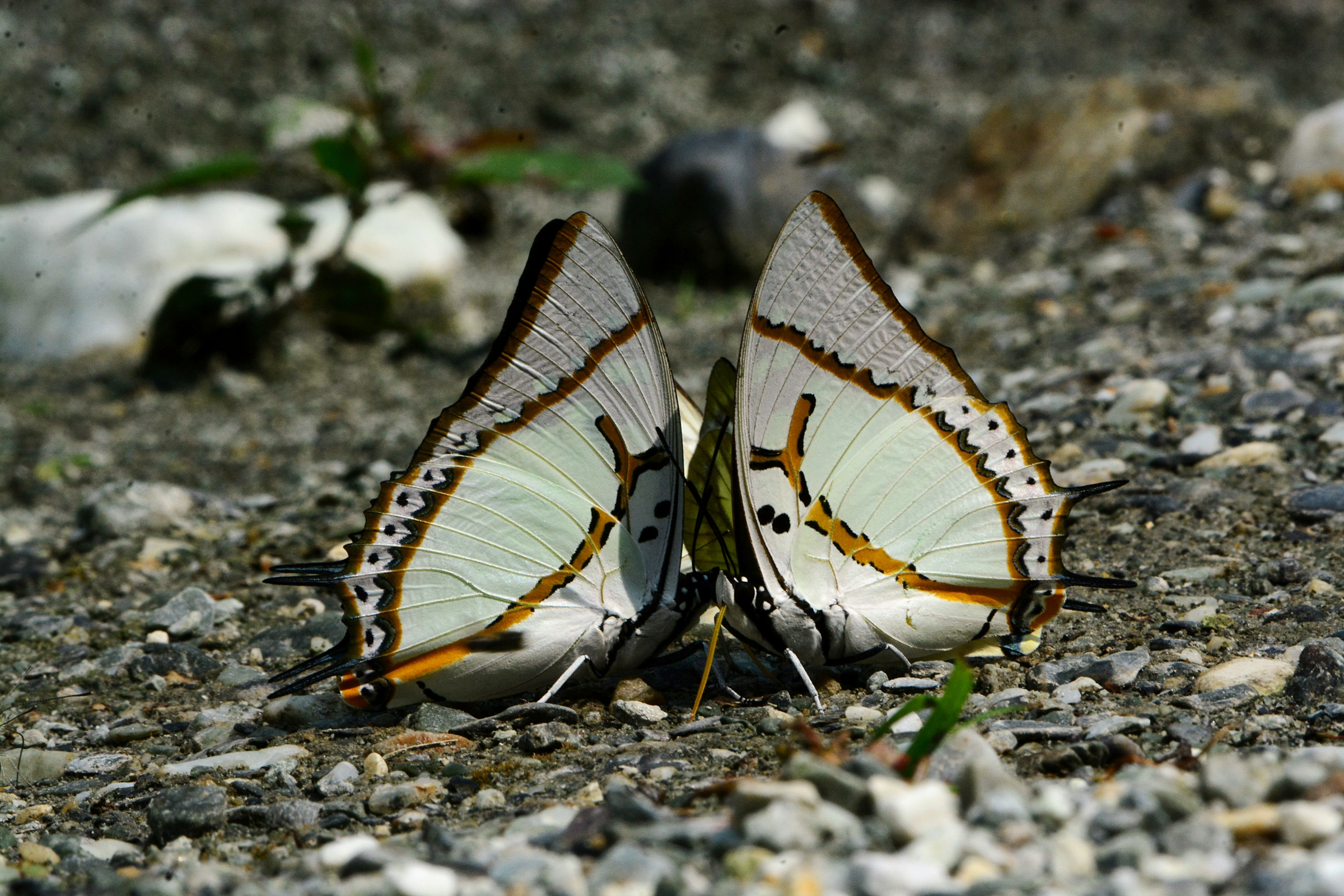
Two male great nawabs mud-puddling at Jayanti river bed, Buxa Tiger Reserve, West Bengal, India

Upperside ground colour pale yellowish white. Forewing has the costal margin, the anterior part of the cell, a transverse bar at its apex, joining a broad line at base of interspace 3, and the whole apical half of the wing purplish black; the black area narrows posteriorly, extends to the tornus and bears the following yellowish-white spots: a spot beyond apex of cell, followed by two obliquely placed spots beyond, a postdiscal oblique and a subterminal erect series of spots. Hindwing: a postdiscal black band narrowing posteriorly, its inner margin slightly, its outer margin highly sinuous, traversed by an inner series of blue lunules, and an outer series of prominent yellowish-white spots; this is followed by a subterminal narrow band of blue and a terminal black line, both of these stop short of the tornus, which beyond the end of the postdiscal black hand is conspicuously yellowish white. Underside silvery white. Forewing: two black spots in cell, followed by a short isolated Y-shaped mark, a discal oblique and a terminal erect band olivaceous brown; the Y-shaped mark has its fork at the lower apex of the cell, is more or less bordered on both sides by conspicuous broken black lines, and does not extend either to the costa or below vein 2; the discal band is outwardly margined by a series of detached black lunules. Hindwing with three transverse brownish-yellow bands as follows: an excurved baso-median band, bordered anteriorly on both sides by broken black lines, meeting above the tornus a postdiscal band, outwardly bordered by a series of black lunules with whitish centres, a detached row of black spots in the interspaces, and a subterminal irregular band outwardly bordered with greenish; tails black with a median streak of pale blue; tornus conspicuously ochraceous; a sub-tornal short transverse black line crossing from the dorsum to the baso-median band. Antennae and head black, thorax dusky greyish black, abdomen yellowish white; beneath, the palpi, thorax and abdomen white, the thorax with a conspicuous obliquely transverse black line on each side.

Wingspan can reach 98–121 millimetres (3.9–4.8 in).

== Biology ==
Larvae feed on Rhamnella franguloides, Celtis boninensis, and Albizia species.

== Distribution ==
This species can be found in north-eastern India (Sikkim, Assam), Nepal, Bhutan, Burma, China, Taiwan, Japan (Ryukyu), Malaysia, and Indochina.

== See also ==
- List of butterflies of India
- List of butterflies of India (Nymphalidae)
