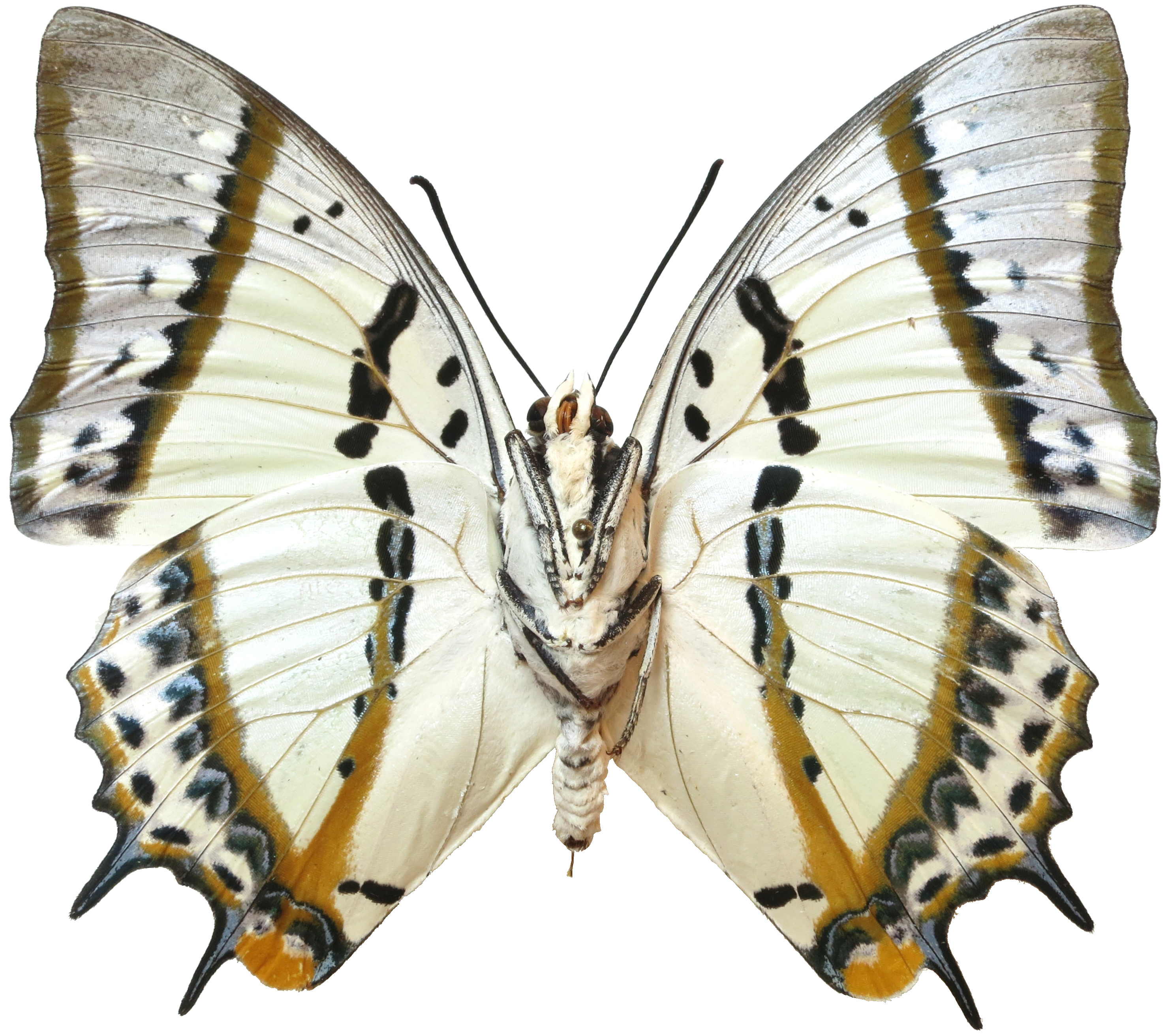
- Polyura nepenthes nepenthes male verso.

Scientific classification
- Domain: Eukaryota
- Kingdom: Animalia
- Phylum: Arthropoda
- Class: Insecta
- Order: Lepidoptera
- Family: Nymphalidae
- Subfamily: Charaxinae
- Tribe: Charaxini
- Genus: Polyura
- Species: P. nepenthes

Binomial name
- Polyura nepenthes (Grose-Smith, 1883)

Synonyms
- Charaxes nepenthes Grose-Smith, 1883; Charaxes (Polyura) nepenthes; Eriboea nepenthes fugator Fruhstorfer, 1914; Eriboea nepenthes kiangsiensis Rousseau-Decelle, 1938

= Polyura nepenthes =

Species of butterfly

Polyura nepenthes is a butterfly in the family Nymphalidae. It was described by Henley Grose-Smith in 1883. It is found in the Indomalayan realm.

== Subspecies ==
- P. n. nepenthes (Burma, Thailand, Indo-China, southern China, Hainan)
- P. n. kiangsiensis (Rousseau-Decelle, 1938) (China: Jiangxi, Zhejiang)

== Biology ==
The larva feeds on Leguminosae.
