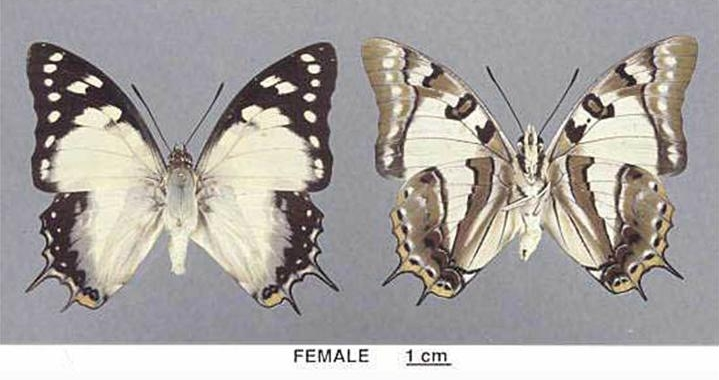
- Mounted female

Scientific classification
- Domain: Eukaryota
- Kingdom: Animalia
- Phylum: Arthropoda
- Class: Insecta
- Order: Lepidoptera
- Family: Nymphalidae
- Genus: Polyura
- Species: P. sempronius

Binomial name
- Polyura sempronius (Fabricius, 1793)

Synonyms
- Charaxes sempronius Fabricius, 1793

= Polyura sempronius =

Tailed emperor

Species of butterfly

Polyura (pyrrhus) sempronius, the tailed emperor, is a large butterfly by Australian standards, with a wingspan of some 75 mm for males and 85 mm for females. The uncommon but widespread butterfly occurs in a variety of habitat types in northern and eastern Australia, where it occurs predominantly in the warm and subtropical coastal regions. It is a resident species where its food plants, certain legumes (Mimosaceae and Caesalpiniaceae) and kurrajongs, are native.

== Description ==
=== Larva ===
The green, mature caterpillar is unique among Australian butterflies. A yellow line runs along each side, and the back is marked by one or more crescent shapes. The green head has two pairs of long horns besides a smaller set behind the head-scale.

=== Adult ===
The upperside is boldly marked in black and white, with narrow blue-grey margins, and specks of orange on the hindwings. The prominent double-pointed tails gives the butterfly its name. The underwing of both sexes are marked in complex patterns of red and yellow brown, against on a white background, bordered by black outlines and an orange edge to the hindwing.

== Range ==
Though formerly limited to northern and eastern Australia, it expanded its range during the 1970s. It may now be found in southern New South Wales, Victoria and eastern South Australia, but it is not permanently established. Its residence in the southern regions depends on mild winters, and availability of their food plants. It was first noted in Adelaide in 1973, where it remains rare.

== Food plants ==
The larval food is the foliage of certain native and introduced tree species. The native species include wattles, Illawarra flame-tree, lacebark or white kurrajong, kurrajong and Celtis species, while the black locust or false acacia is an exotic species that is also favoured. Adults may feed on the sap of trees, rotting fruit and moisture from dung.

== Habits ==
These fast, strong flyers are mostly seen in the dry season. Males frequent hilltops, and establish territories, by perching head down, some 3 m up in trees, while they move the hindwings move up and down. Two or more generations may be produced annually.

== Gallery ==
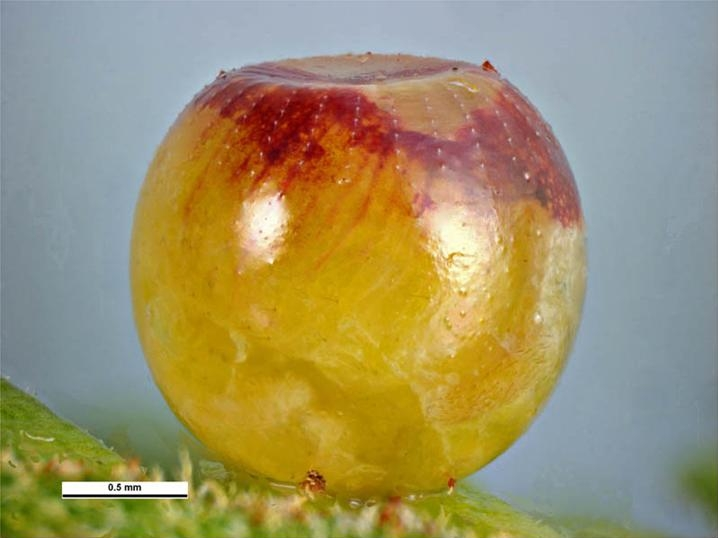
Egg

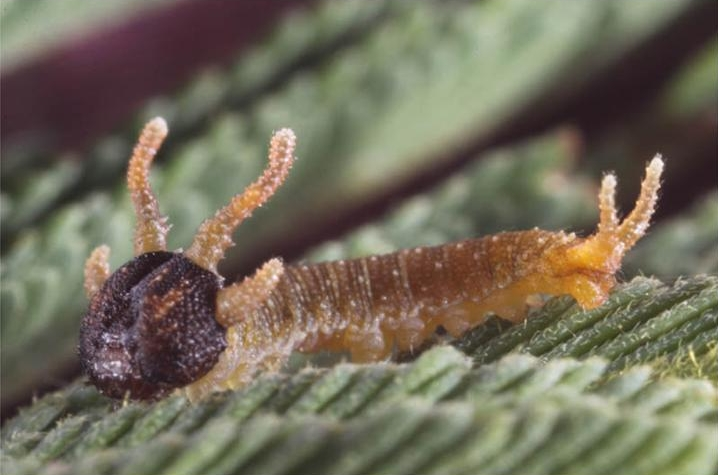
Larva

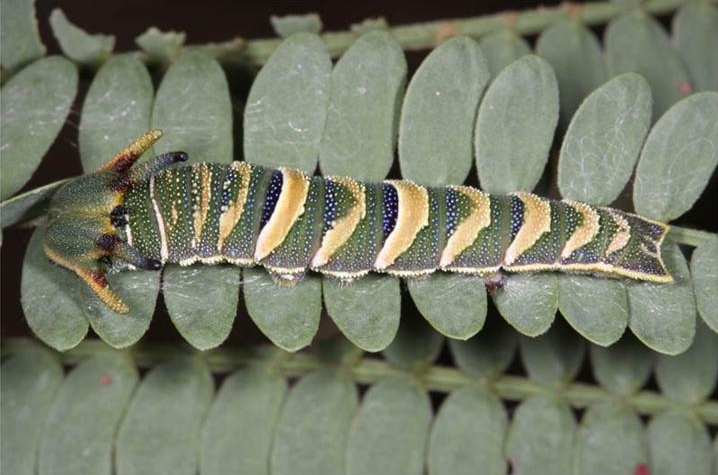
Later instar larva

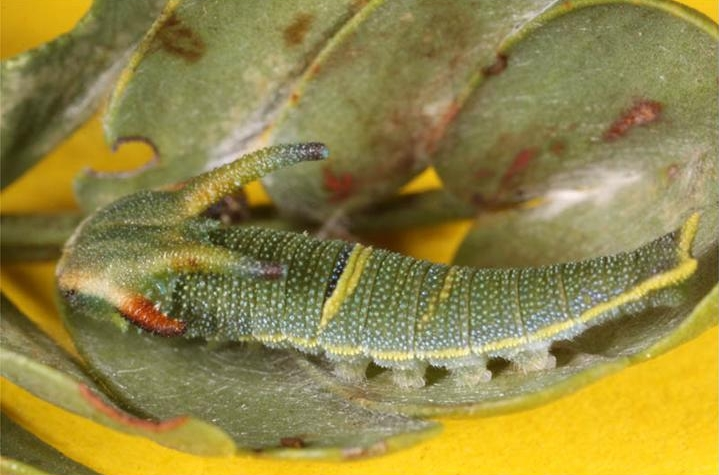
Later instar larva

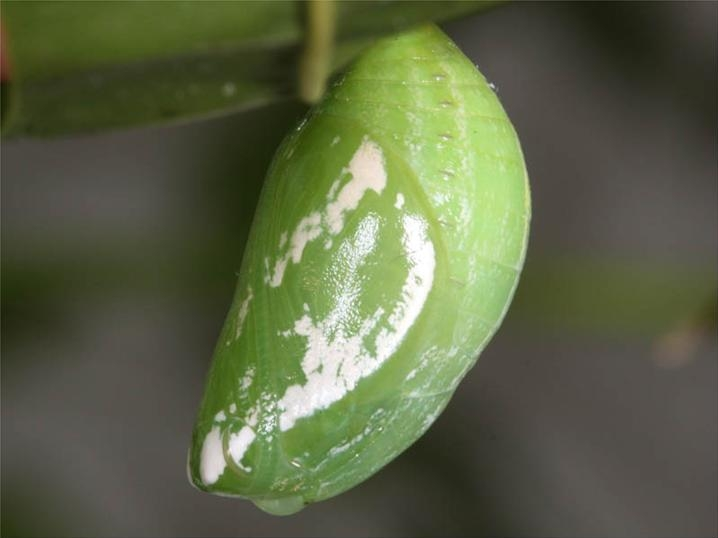
Pupa

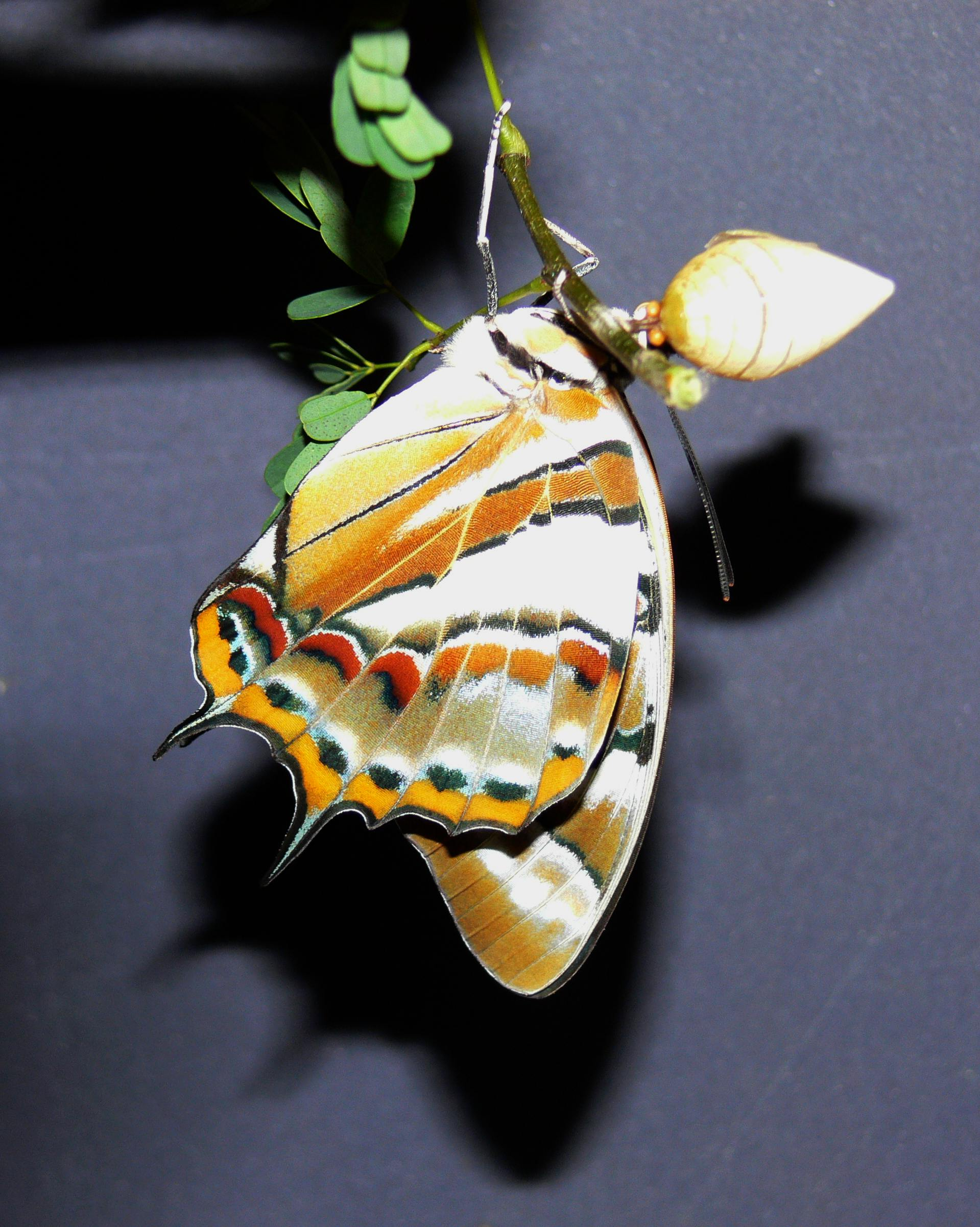
Emerging from chrysalis

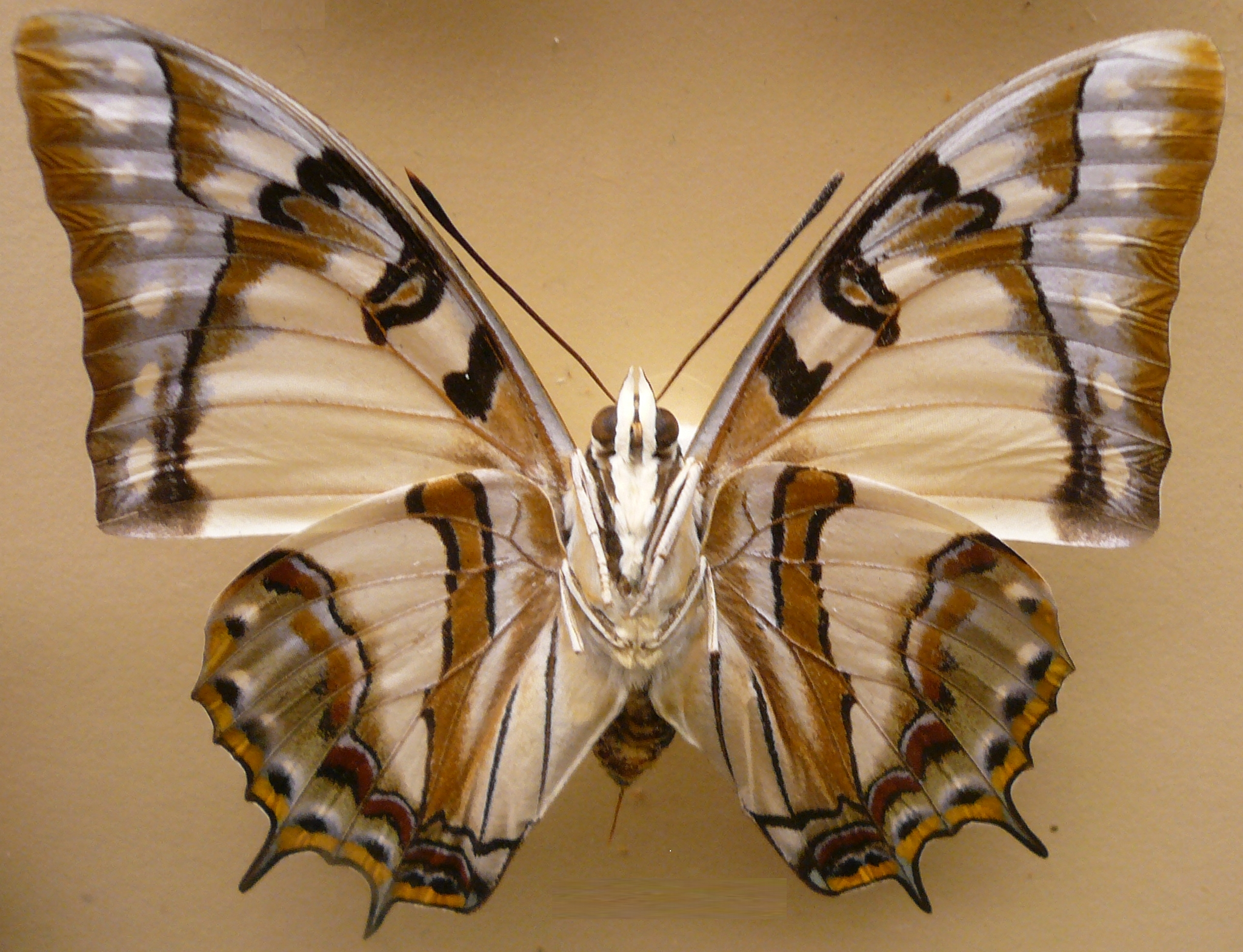
Tailed emperor
