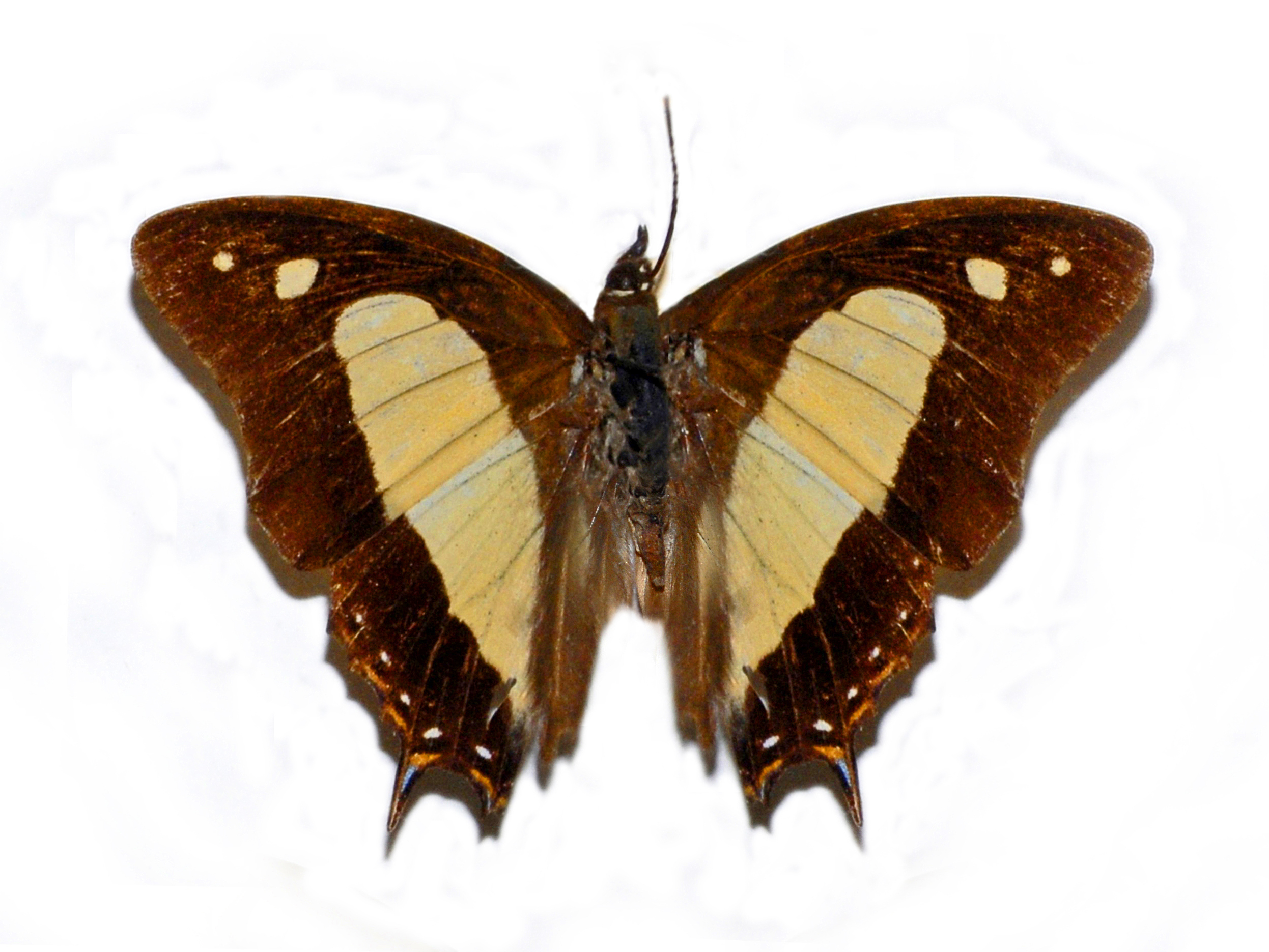
- Dorsal view
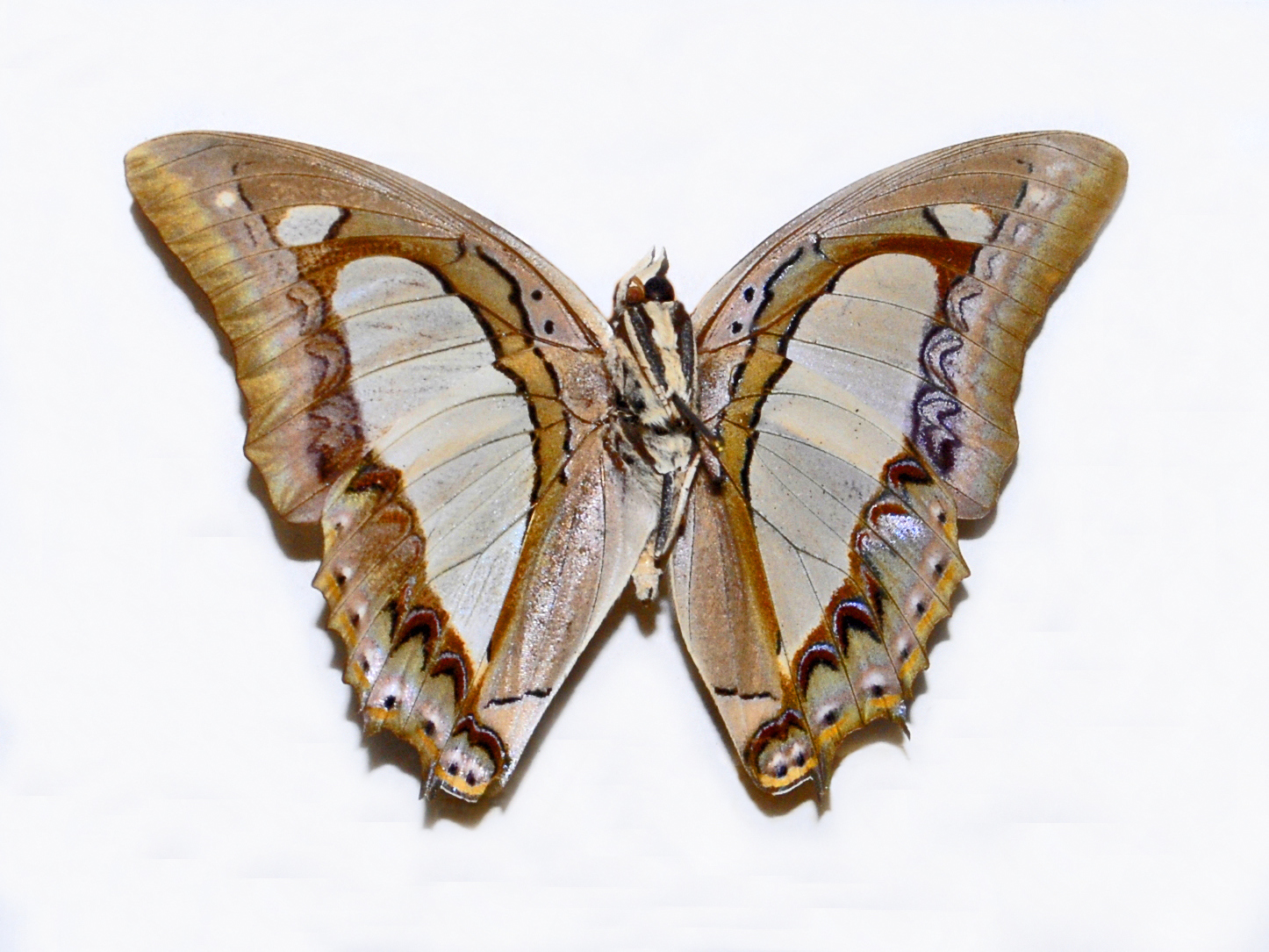
- Ventral view

Scientific classification
- Kingdom: Animalia
- Phylum: Arthropoda
- Class: Insecta
- Order: Lepidoptera
- Family: Nymphalidae
- Genus: Polyura
- Species: P. arja

Binomial name
- Polyura arja (C. Felder & R. Felder) 1867

Synonyms
- Charaxes arja C. & R. Felder, [1867]; Charaxes arja roeberi Fruhstorfer, 1898; Eulepis arja f. temp. vernus Rothschild, 1899; Eulepis arja f. temp. arja ab. roeberi Rothschild & Jordan, 1898

= Polyura arja =

Pallid nawab

Species of butterfly

Polyura arja, the pallid nawab, is a butterfly belonging to the rajahs and nawabs group, that is, the Charaxinae subfamily of the brush-footed butterflies family.

== Subspecies ==
- Polyura arja arja

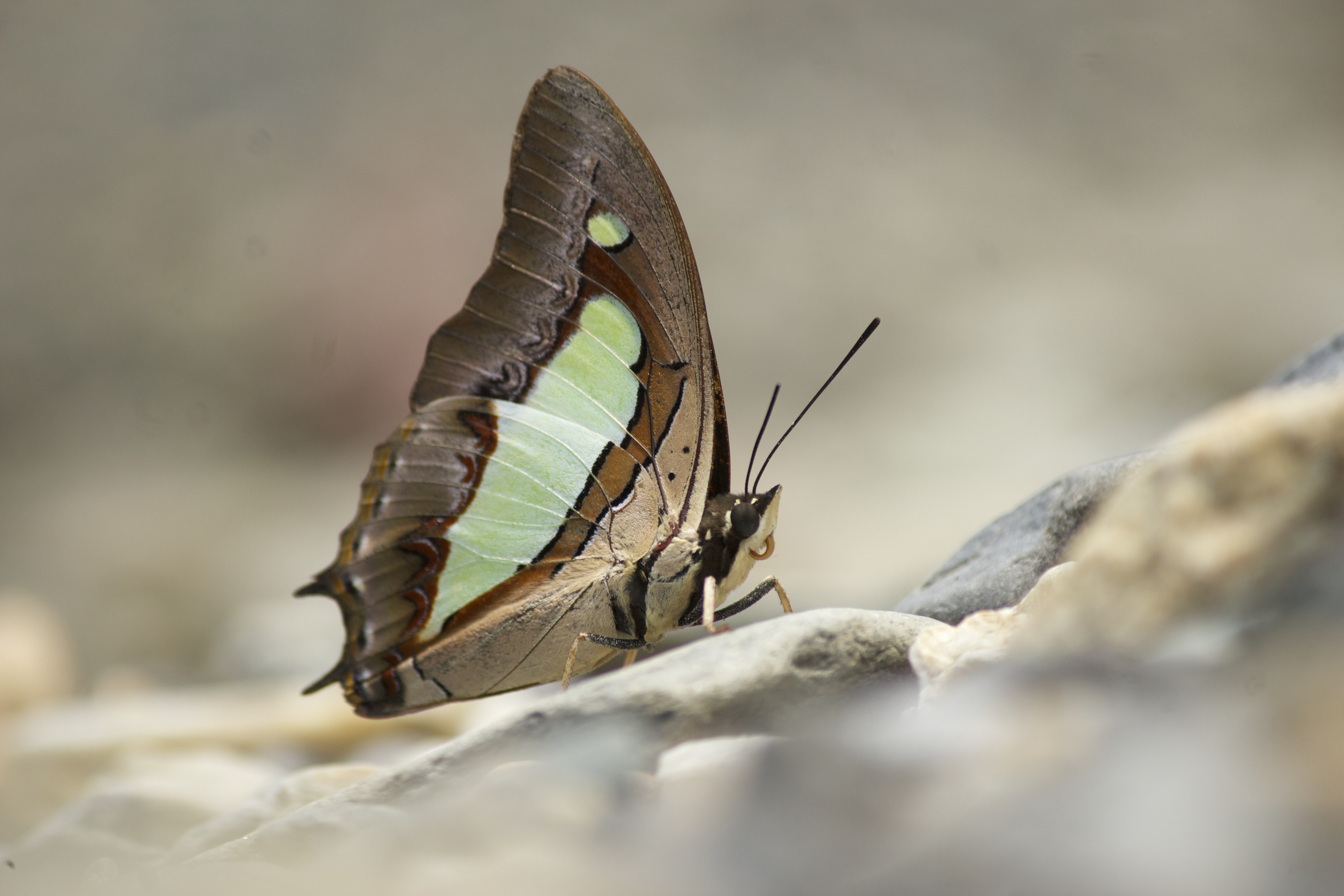

== Description ==
Polyura arja has a wingspan of 75–80 millimetres (3.0–3.1 in). The outer edge of the forewings is concave and the hindwings show two short blue tails. The upperside of the wings is brown with a broad white or anteriorly pale green band from the inner edge of the forewing to the costal edge of the hindwings, one or two small white spots at the apex of the forewings and a continuous row of white or pale yellow spots running along the outer submargin of the hindwings. The underside of the wings is lighter brown with a quite similar pattern. The body is dark brown.

Seitz -E. arja is an exclusively continental species of pronounced seasonal dimorphism, distinguished from E. athamas by the peculiar pale greenish white discal blotches on the upper surface. Underneath the black submarginal striae are surrounded by a broader, pale greyish-white shade. The transcellular spot on the forewings always larger. — vernus R.and J. (134 a) refers to the extreme dry-season form, in which the pale colouring prevails, whereas roeberi Fruhst. (134 a) designates the larger-sized, extreme rainy-season form with broadly black border. — arja Fldr., the commonest (intermediate) form, with the median area broader than in roeberi. The latter I [Hans Fruhstorfer]] only know from Assam, whereas vernus and arja are found from Sikkim to Tenasserim. May till October, according to Niceville throughout the year in the hot valleys. I myself took several specimens at Chiem-Hoa (Tonkin) in August. Recently I also saw some small-sized specimens from Petjaburi (Siam).

== Distribution ==
This species can be found in north-east India (Sikkim to Assam), Burma, Thailand and Indochina.

== See also ==
- List of butterflies of India
- List of butterflies of India (Nymphalidae)

== Bibliography ==
- Evans, W.H. (1932). The Identification of Indian Butterflies (2nd ed.). Mumbai, India: Bombay Natural History Society.
