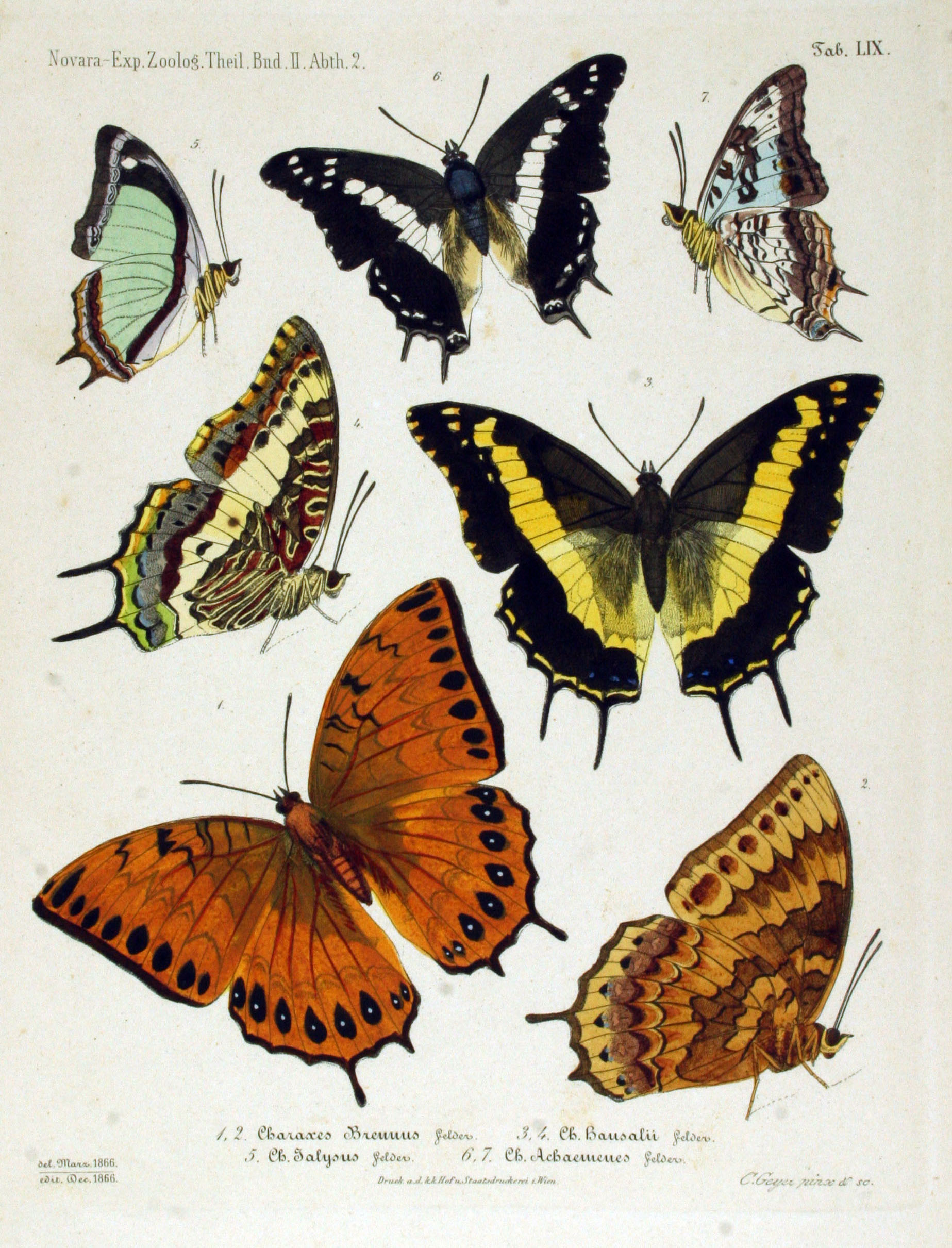
- In C. & R. Felder's Reise der österreichischen Fregatte Novara um die Erde

Scientific classification
- Kingdom: Animalia
- Phylum: Arthropoda
- Class: Insecta
- Order: Lepidoptera
- Family: Nymphalidae
- Genus: Polyura
- Species: P. jalysus

Binomial name
- Polyura jalysus (C. Felder & R. Felder, [1867])

Synonyms
- Eriboea jalysus ephebus Fruhstorfer, 1914; Eriboea jalysus triphonus Fruhstorfer, 1914

= Polyura jalysus =

Species of butterfly

Polyura jalysus, the Indian yellow nawab, is a butterfly in the family Nymphalidae. It was described by Cajetan Felder and Rudolf Felder in 1867. It is found in the Indomalayan realm.

== Subspecies ==
- Polyura jalysus jalysus (Sumatra, Peninsular Malaya, Thailand, Vietnam)
- Polyura jalysus ephebus (Fruhstorfer, 1914) (Burma, Thailand)
- Polyura jalysus triphonus (Fruhstorfer, 1914) (Borneo)

Seitz Plate 137

== Description ==
E. jalysus inhabits Macromalayana except Java and occurs northward as far as Tenasserim and Tonkin. Three geographical forms are to be mentioned: triphonius subsp. nov. (134 b) differs from the first described race from the Malayan peninsula by its larger size, the broader yellow and reddish-brown distal margin of the upper surface of the hindwings. The apical spot of the forewings grows larger than in specimens from Sumatra, the brown of the under surface darker than in jalysus and specimens from Tonkin. North Borneo, rare. —- jalysus Fldr. (137 a) depicted according to a male from Sumatra, is inferior to triphonius in the habitus exhibiting, therefore, also a smaller preapical spot than the specimens from Borneo. Perak, North East Sumatra. ephebus subsp. nov. has a whitish-green instead of black cell of the forewings. Upper surface: the dark terminal margin of the hindwings is sometimes extinct and is interrupted in all the specimens. The reddish-brown sub¬ marginal band of the under surface of the hindwings also more effaced. Type from Birma in the British Museum. Similar specimens also in the Tring Museum. Discovered by myself as new for Tonkin near Chiem-Hoa in August.
