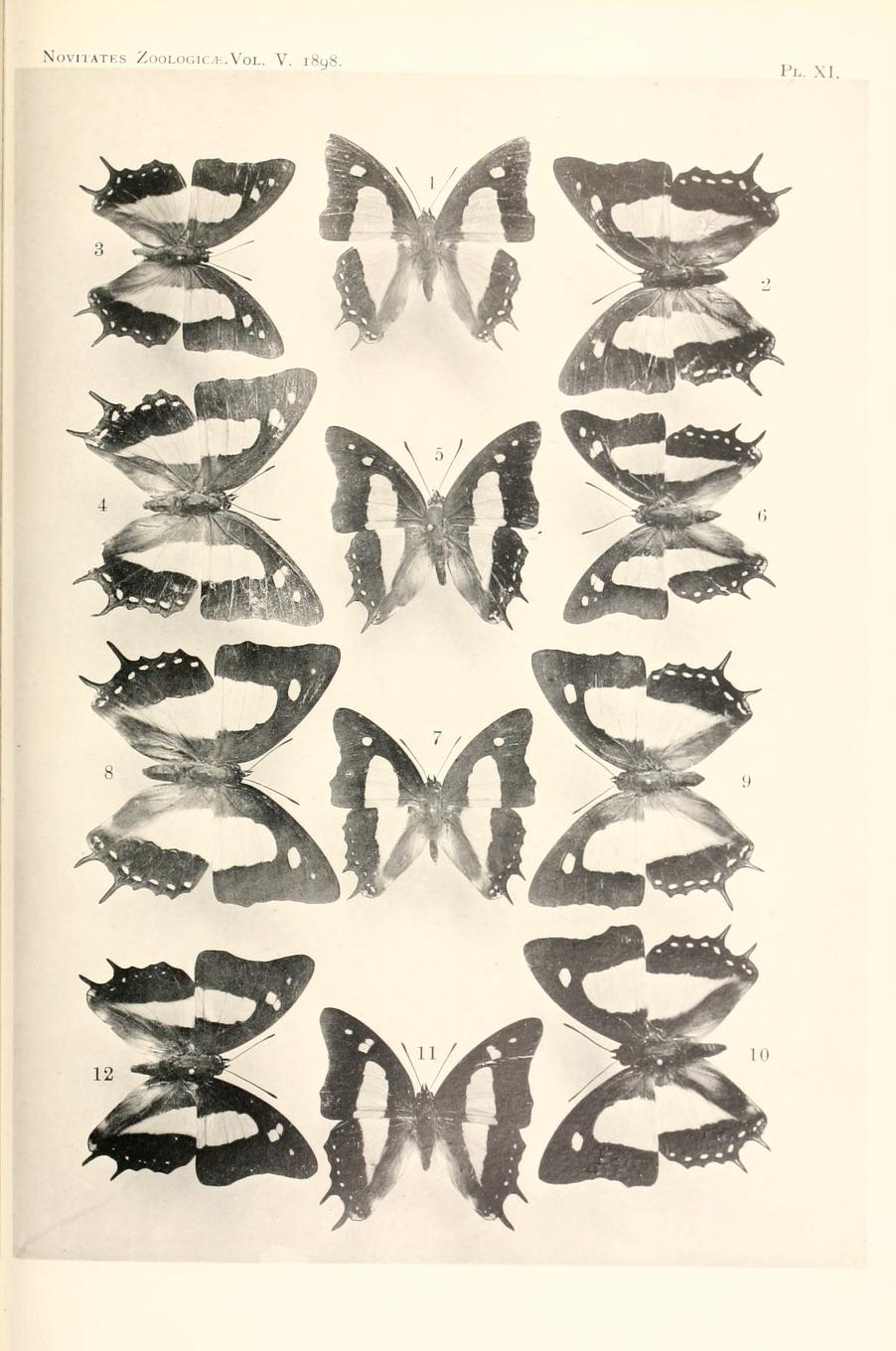
- figure 11 in Rothschild & Jordan, 1899

Scientific classification
- Kingdom: Animalia
- Phylum: Arthropoda
- Class: Insecta
- Order: Lepidoptera
- Family: Nymphalidae
- Genus: Charaxes
- Species: C. alphius

Binomial name
- Charaxes alphius Staudinger, 1886

Synonyms
- Polyura alphius; Eriboea athamas oitylus Fruhstorfer, 1914; Charaxes (Eulepis) athamas piepersianus Martin, 1924

= Polyura alphius =

Species of butterfly

Charaxes (Polyura) alphius, or Staudinger's nawab, is a butterfly in the family Nymphalidae. It was described by Otto Staudinger in 1886. It is found on Timor and Sulawesi near the Wallace Line. Polyura alphius has been considered a subspecies of Polyura athamas Polyura athamas alphius.

== Subspecies ==
- Charaxes alphius alphius (Timor)
- Charaxes alphius piepersianus (Martin, 1924) (southern Sulawesi)
