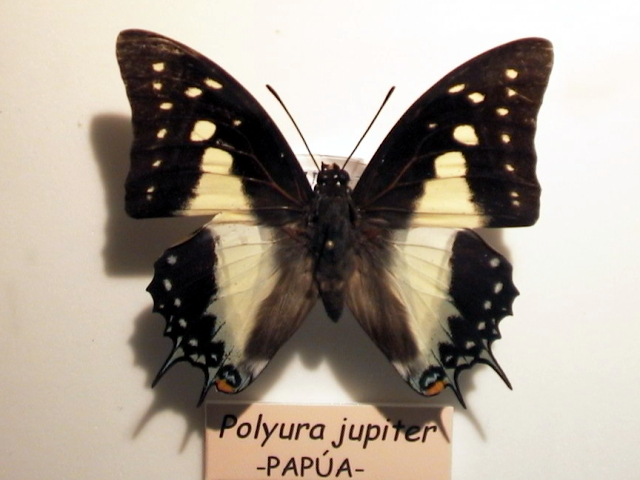

Scientific classification
- Domain: Eukaryota
- Kingdom: Animalia
- Phylum: Arthropoda
- Class: Insecta
- Order: Lepidoptera
- Family: Nymphalidae
- Genus: Polyura
- Species: P. jupiter

Binomial name
- Polyura jupiter (Butler, 1869)

Synonyms
- Charaxes jupiter Butler, 1869; Charaxes chlorus Fruhstorfer, 1914; Eulepis pyrrhus admiralitatis Rothschild, 1915; Charaxes attila Grose-Smith, 1889; Charaxes pyrrhus keianus Rothschild & Jordan, 1897; Charaxes pyrrhus seitzi Rothschild, 1897; Eulepis pyrrhus watubela Rothschild, 1903

= Polyura jupiter =

Species of butterfly

Polyura jupiter is a butterfly of the family Nymphalidae. It is found in Indonesia and surrounding islands.

The upper side is brown, very largely marked with white, with forewings in a triangle from the costal margin and in the form of spots, including small ones in a submarginal line, and on the hindwings in a broad triangle, from the costal edge to the anal angle marked by an orange spot. Walter Rothschild and Karl Jordan (1900) provide a full description.

The larvae feed on Albizia stipulata.

== Subspecies ==
- Polyura jupiter jupiter (western Papua)
- Polyura jupiter kronos (Honrath, 1888) (Bismarck Archipelago)
- Polyura jupiter admiralitatis (Rothschild, 1915) (Admiralty Islands)
- Polyura jupiter attila (Grose-Smith, 1889) (Guadalcanal)
- Polyura jupiter keianus (Rothschild & Jordan, 1897) (Key)
- Polyura jupiter seitzi (Rothschild, 1897) (Tanimbar)
- Polyura jupiter watubela (Rothschild, 1903) (Watubela)

== Taxonomy ==
Currently a subspecies of Polyura pyrrhus Pollyura pyrrhus ssp. jupiter Butler, 1869
