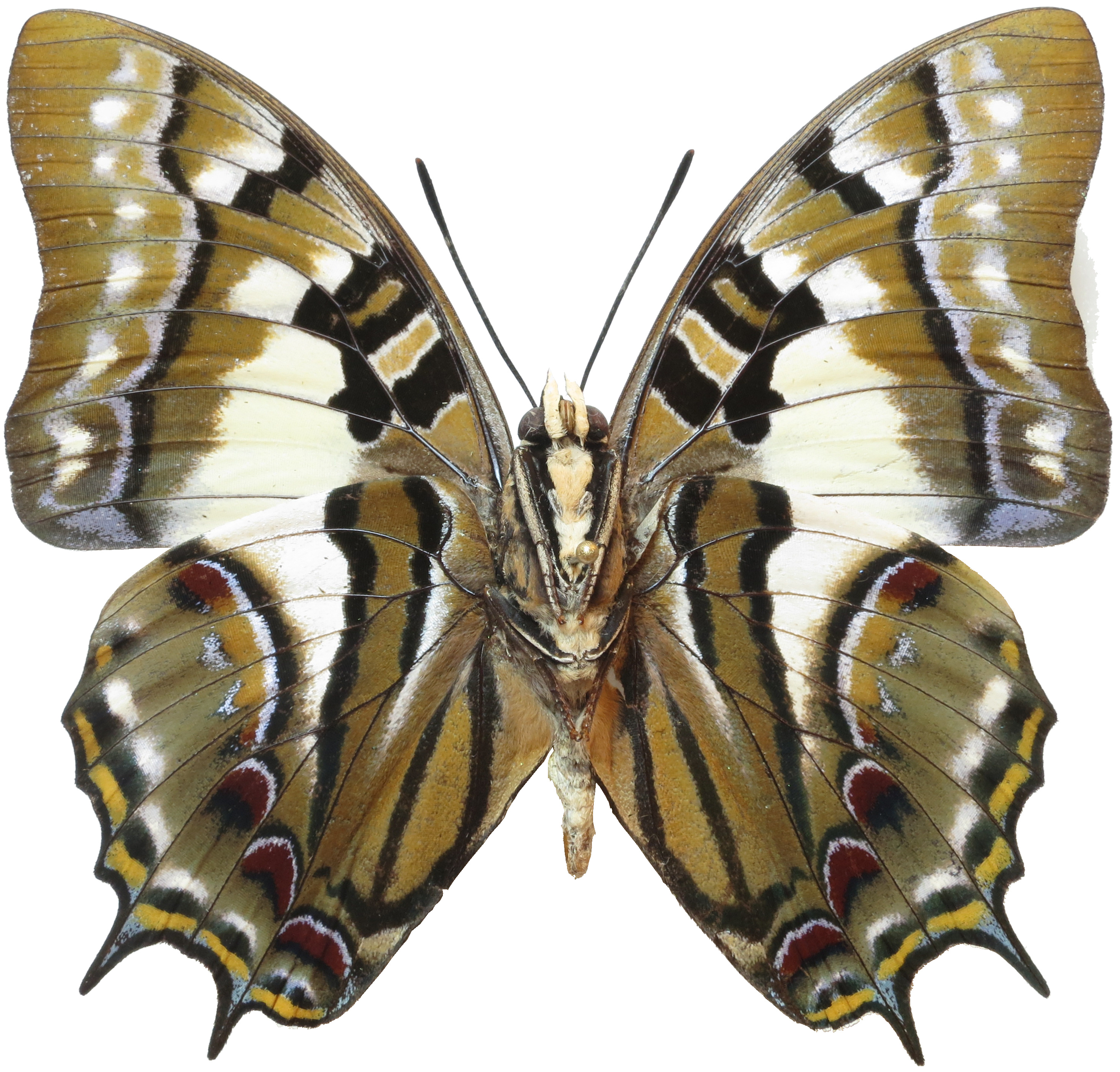
- Polyura pyrrhus pyrrhus

Scientific classification
- Kingdom: Animalia
- Phylum: Arthropoda
- Class: Insecta
- Order: Lepidoptera
- Family: Nymphalidae
- Genus: Charaxes
- Species: C. pyrrhus

Binomial name
- Charaxes pyrrhus (Linnaeus, 1758)

Synonyms
- Papilio pyrrhus Linnaeus, 1758; Polyura pyrrhus; Papilio canomaculatus Goeze, 1779; Papilio sempronius Fabricius, 1793; Jasia australis Swainson, 1833; Charaxes tyrtaeus C. & R. Felder, 1859; Charaxes galaxia Butler, [1866]; Eulepis pyrrhus pyrrhulus Fruhstorfer, 1903; Charaxes jovis Staudinger, 1895; Eulepis pyrrhus bandanus Rothschild, 1898; Eulepis pyrrhus lettianus Rothschild, 1898; Eulepis pyrrhus aloranus Rothschild, 1898; Eulepis pyrrhus kalaonicus Rothschild, 1898; Eulepis pyrrhus scipio Rothschild, 1898; Eulepis pyrrhus babbericus Fruhstorfer, 1903; Eulepis pyrrhus antigonus Fruhstorfer, 1904; Eulepis pyrrhus romanus Fruhstorfer, 1904; Eulepis pyrrhus tiberius Waterhouse, 1920

= Polyura pyrrhus =

Species of butterfly

Charaxes (Polyura) pyrrhus is a butterfly in the family Nymphalidae. It was described by Carl Linnaeus in his 1758 10th edition of Systema Naturae. It is found in the Australasian realm including New Guinea, Australia, Timor, Moluccas.

== Subspecies ==
- C. p. pyrrhus (Buru, Ambon, Seram, Saraparua, Batjan)
- C. p. sempronius (Fabricius, 1793) (Australia)
- C. p. galaxia (Butler, [1866]) (Timor, Wetar)
- C. p. jovis (Staudinger, 1895) (Sumbawa)
- C. p. bandanus (Rothschild, 1898) (Banda Island)
- C. p. lettianus (Rothschild, 1898) (Letti)
- C. p. aloranus (Rothschild, 1898) (Alor)
- C. p. kalaonicus (Rothschild, 1898) (Kalao, Flores)
- C. p. scipio (Rothschild, 1898) (Sumba)
- C. p. babbericus (Fruhstorfer, 1903) (Babar)
- C. p. antigonus(Fruhstorfer, 1904) (Sermata, Damar)
- C. p. romanus (Fruhstorfer, 1904) (Romang)
- C. p. tiberius (Waterhouse, 1920) (Lord Howe Island)

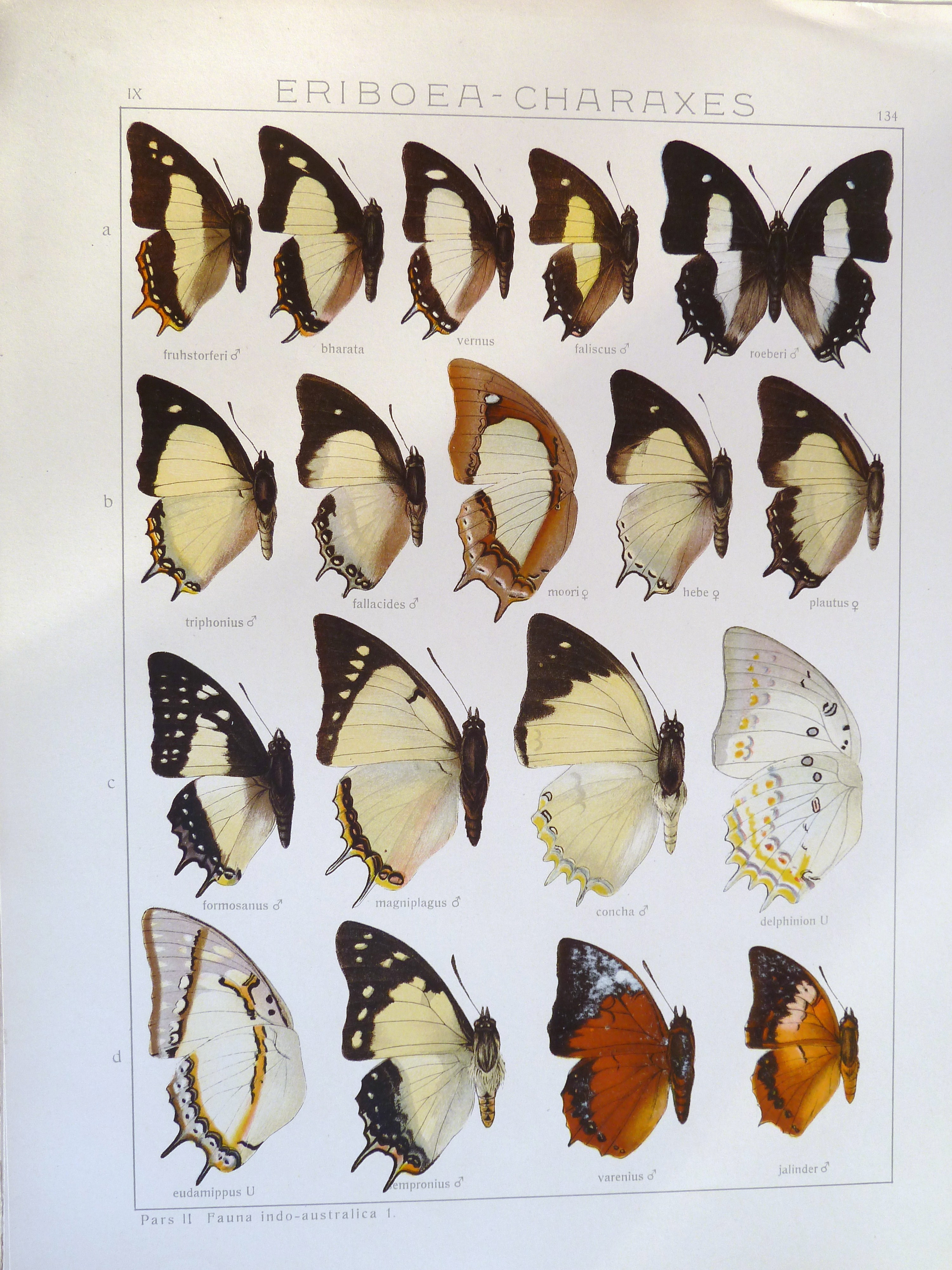
Seitz Plate 134

|

== Description ==
E. pyrrhus, the most multiform species of the genus, being the most widely distributed in the Malayan Archipelago and forming the most characteristic example of insular differentiability. The two extremes of the colouring on the upper surface are exhibited by our figures 134 d (sempronius) with preponderantly yellowish green colours and uncovered basal region of the upper surface, and (jupiter [ now full species]) (135 a) with predominantly black bordering and the basal zone covered with black. The former group of forms is confined to Australia and Micromalayana, the latter group to the subregion of the Moluccas and Papuans. Both are united by transitions as for instance the proper pyrrhus from Amboina. The under surface also shades off from one island to another by the increase or reduction of the black and reddish-brown spots as well as of the white median areas of which especially that of the hindwings may increase or decrease in extent and also in length. Female always larger than the male of a most variable development of the orange terminal margin of the under surface of the hind¬ wings. Larva only known of one race, on Albizzia and Mesua ferrea, the iron-wood tree. Pupa of the usual sacciform shape of the pupae of the Charaxides, broad, rounded off with some tubercles on the cremaster, pale-green with snow-white stripes and spots. The flight of the butterflies is rapid, what we may guess already from the appearance of the imago being frequently known only in the female form. Males sometimes on blossoming trees where they rest for some moments opening and closing their wings with a scratching sound similar to that of Prepona. Seitz op. cit. gives an account of the numerous forms.

== Biology ==
The larva feeds on species in the genera Acacia, Albizia, Robinia, Cassia, Celtis and Ponsiana.
