= List of butterflies of China (Riodinidae) =

This is a list of the butterflies of China belonging to the family Riodinidae and an index to the species articles. This forms part of the full list of butterflies of China.

== Riodinidae ==
genus: Abisara

- Abisara fylla fylla (Westwood, [1851])
- Abisara chelina chelina (Fruhstorfer, [1904])
- Abisara freda Bennett, 1957
- Abisara fylloides (Moore, 1902) West China
- Abisara neophron (Hewitson, 1861)

A. n. neophron Tibet

- Abisara burnii (de Nicéville, 1895)

A. b. assus Fruhstorfer South China

- Abisara echerius (Stoll, [1790])

A. e. lisa Bennet Hainan

- Abisara saturata (Moore, 1878)

A. s. saturata Hainan

- Abisara abnormis Moore, [1884]

genus: Dodona

- Dodona eugenes (Guerin, 1843)
- Dodona egeon (Westwood, 1851)
- Dodona dipoea (Hewitson, 1865)
- Dodona adonira (Hewitson, 1865)
- Dodona durga (Kollar & Redtenbacher, 1844)
- Dodona ouida (Hewitson, 1865)
- Dodona deodata Hewitson, 1876
- Dodona henrici (Guerin, 1843)
- Dodona kaolinkon Yoshino, 1999 West Yunnan
- Dodona maculosa Leech, 1890
- Dodona hoenei Forster 1951 North Yunnan, Likiang.

genus: Paralaxita

- Paralaxita dora (Fruhstorfer, 1904)

P. d. hainana (Riley & Godfrey, 1925)

genus: Polycaena

- Polycaena princeps (Oberthür, 1886)
- Polycaena lama Leech, 1893
- Polycaena chauchowensis (Mell, 1923)
- Polycaena carmelita Oberthür, 1903
- Polycaena lua Grum-Grshimailo, [1891]
- Polycaena matuta Leech, [1893]
- Polycaena kansuensis (Nordström, 1935)
- Polycaena yunnana Sugiyama, 1997
- Polycaena aestivalis Oberthür 1903

genus: Stiboges

- Stiboges nymphidia Butler, 1876

S. n. elodinia Fruhstorfer, 1914 China

genus: Zemeros

- Zemeros flegyas (Cramer, [1780])

Z. f. flegyas Yunnan
Z. f. confucius (Moore, 1878) Hainan
