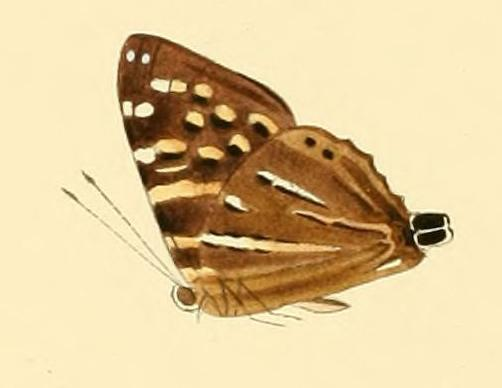

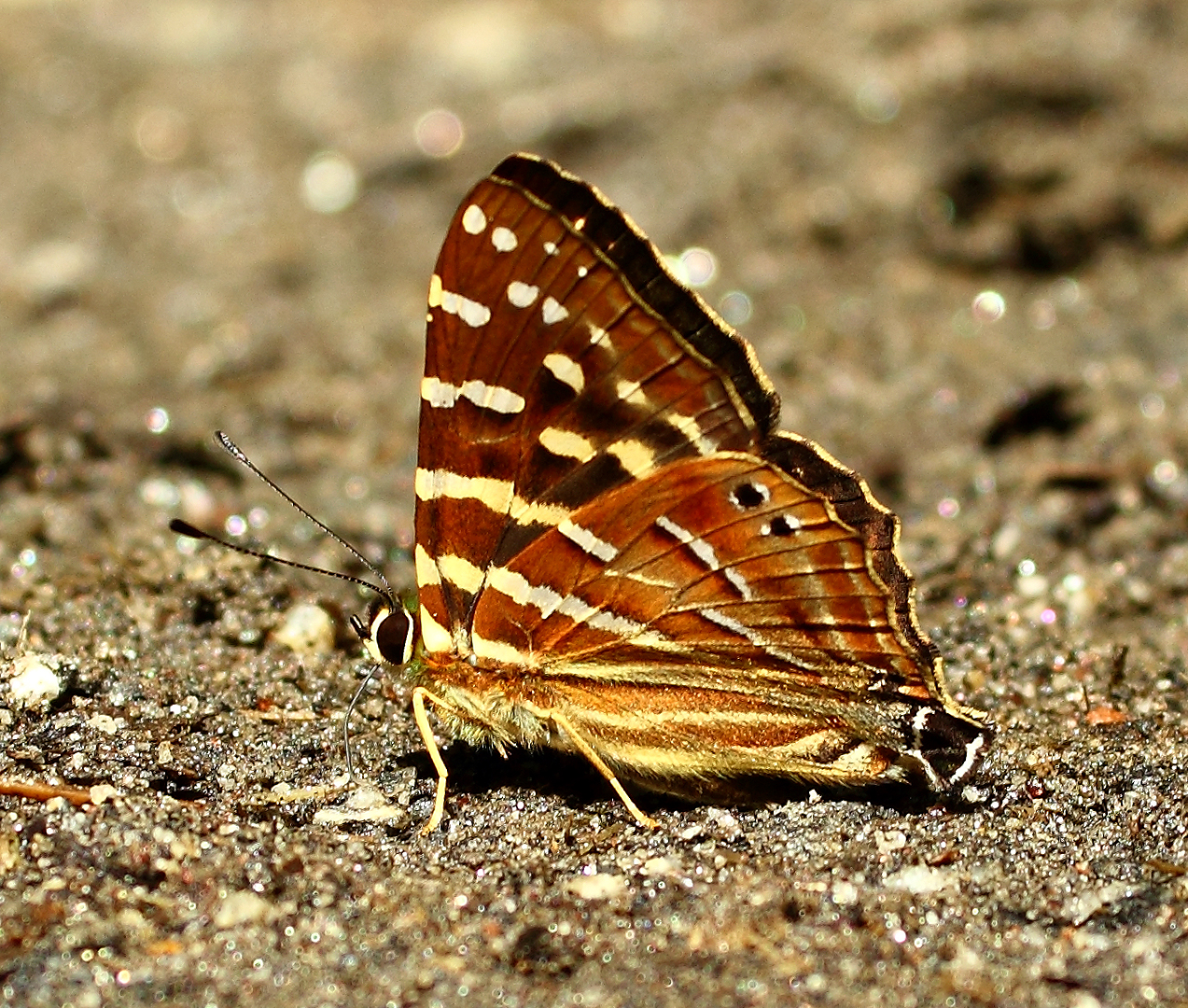

Scientific classification
- Kingdom: Animalia
- Phylum: Arthropoda
- Clade: Pancrustacea
- Class: Insecta
- Order: Lepidoptera
- Family: Riodinidae
- Genus: Dodona
- Species: D. dipoea

Binomial name
- Dodona dipoea (Hewitson, 1865)

= Dodona dipoea =

Lesser Punch

Species of butterfly

Dodona dipoea, the lesser Punch, is a small but striking butterfly found in the Indomalayan realm (Tibet, Himalayas, Northeast India (hills), Burma, West China) that belongs to the Punches and Judies, that is, the family Riodinidae.

== Description ==
From Charles Thomas Bingham (1905) The Fauna of British India, Including Ceylon and Burma, Butterflies, Vol. 1

Males and females. Upperside dark brown, with the following pale ochraceous markings: Forewing : a narrow band across middle of cell continued below in interspace 1, a slightly oblique, macular, short, narrow band beyond apex of cell with a transverse spot- below in interspace 2; a transverse discal series of spots, two in interspace 1, one each in interspaces 3, 6 and 8, followed by a postdiscal transverse series of spots, of which the spots in interspaces 4 and 5 are shifted inwards out of line, and a very obscure subterminal row of transversely linear spots somewhat as in Dodona durga. Hindwing also with the markings somewhat as in D. durga but pale dull brown rather than ochraceous, the black spots at apex and on the lobe as in D. durga. Underside ochraceous brown. Forewing: a spot at base of costal margin, basal, subbasal and discal oblique transverse bands, the last macular and interrupted in interspace 3, and a transverse suhterminal sinuous series of spots. Between the discal and subterminal markings is a short subcostal transverse band and a transverse spot in interspace 3; succeeding the subterminal series of spots is an obscure pale line. All the markings are white, bordered on the inner side by dusky dark-brown shadings, their terminations along the costal margin silvery. Hind wing: an ochraceous-white streak along the dorsum not reaching the tornus, similar, very slender streaks along veins 1 a and 1, a slightly broader silvery subbasal streak from costa across middle of cell, a similar streak beyond at apex of cell very slender almost interrupted along the discocellulars, a short upper discal similar streak between veins 3 and 6, followed by a slender zigzag black line margined with white from above the tornal lobe to vein 3; two black subapical white-margined spots, a large black reniform spot on the lobe and a subterminal dark reddish-brown band with pale outer and inner margins. Antennae, head, thorax and abdomen dark brown; beneath, the antennae annulated with white, the palpi, thorax and abdomen dark grey.

- Expanse: 43-52 mm
- Habitat: The Himalayas from Kulu to Sikkim; Bhutan; Assam, the Naga Hills.

== Biology ==
The larva feeds on Poaceae.

== See also ==
- Riodinidae
- List of butterflies of India
- List of butterflies of India (Riodinidae)
