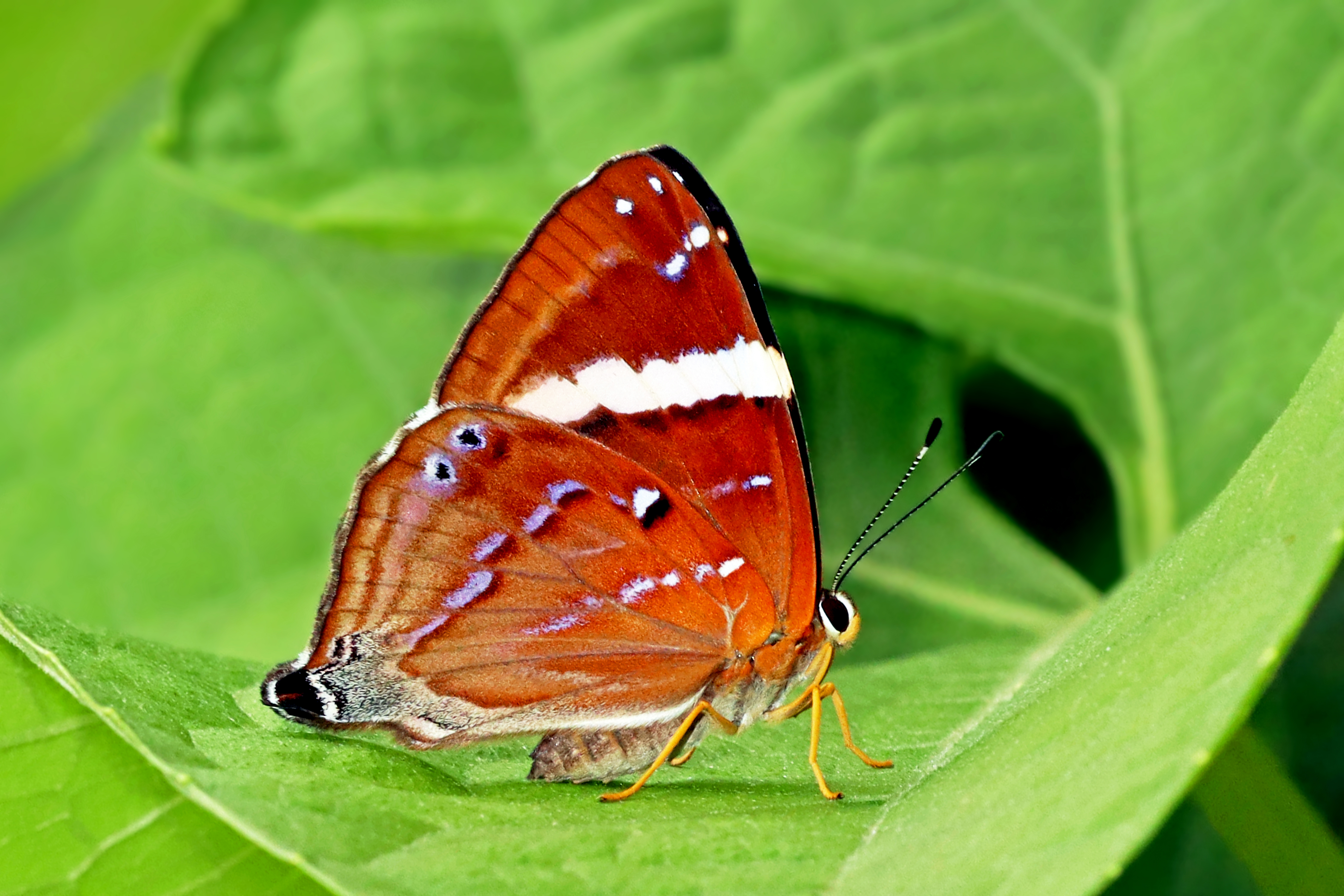

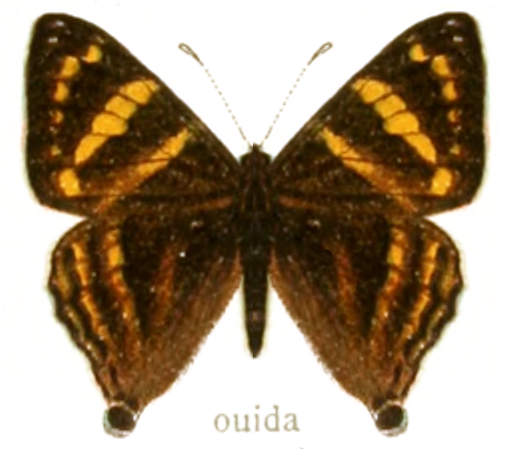

Scientific classification
- Domain: Eukaryota
- Kingdom: Animalia
- Phylum: Arthropoda
- Class: Insecta
- Order: Lepidoptera
- Family: Riodinidae
- Genus: Dodona
- Species: D. ouida

Binomial name
- Dodona ouida (Hewitson, 1865)

= Dodona ouida =

Mixed Punch

Species of butterfly

Dodona ouida, the mixed Punch, is a small but striking butterfly found in the Indomalayan realm in West China, Himalayas (west as far as Mussoorie), Northeast India (hills) and Burma that belongs to the Punches and Judies, that is, the family Riodinidae.

== Description ==
From Charles Thomas Bingham's The Fauna of British India, Including Ceylon and Burma, Butterflies, (1905) Vol. 1:

Male. Upperside ochraceous brown. Fore wing with a yellow oblique band from subcostal vein crossing cell to vein 1, followed by a broader similar dark brown band, then a yellow oblique band, broadest in the middle, extending from costal margin to above tornus; a dark brown oblique band broadest anteriorly from costal margin to tornus; an erect, somewhat irregular, subterminal yellow band; and the apex and termen dark brown, the apex with two minute white dots. Hind wing : postdiscal and inner and outer subterminal obscure incomplete yellow bands, all three bordered on the inner side with blackish brown; the outer sub terminal band with two superposed black spots near apex; tornal lobe dark chestnut-red, margined on the inner and outer sides by short slender white lines. Underside dark ochraceous red, the yellow bands as on the uppetside, but not clearly defined, the inmost band more or less whitish, the medial band terminating in a comparatively large white spot on the costa, the subterminal band very obscure, terminating in two white spots on the costa, the minute white preapical spots as on the upperside. Hind wing: groundcolour darker than on the fore wing: obscure subbasal, discal, inner and outer subterminal pale purplish macular fasciae; the subbasal and discal fascia angulated upwards on vein 1 towards the dorsum, the subterminai two fasciae terminating on the margin of a grey tornal patch placed above the lobe; this last black with white linear margins on inner and outer sides; the subbasal fascia terminating on the costal margin in a white spot, the discal fascia in a black spot outwardly margined by a prominent white dot; the subapical two spots encircled with white. Antennae, head, thorax and abdomen ochraceous brown; beneath, the palpi, thorax and legs bright ochraceous red; abdomen whitish.

- Female: Upperside brown, the apical half of the fore wing of a darker shade than the basal half. Forewing with a broad oblique white band from middle of costa to near the tornus; a subterminal pale lunular line bent inwards towards the costa and terminating in two white spots, and two subapical white dots. Hindwing: an obscure pale sinuous short discal fascia, a subterminal similarly pale broad band traversed by a narrow dark brown kind terminating in two subapical black spots, and a terminal very slender dark line; tornal lobe rusty red, margined slenderly on inner and outer sides by white. Underside: ground-colour similar to that of the male but more brown. Fore wing : the white oblique band and preapical dots as on the upperside, very obscure subbasal and sub-terminal transverse fasciae, the latter terminating on the costal margin in two white spots as in the male. Hind wing with the obscure pale purplish fasciae and other markings as in the male. Antennae dark ochraceous, club black tipped with ochraceous; head, thorax and abdomen brown; beneath- the palpi, thorax and abdomen as in the male.
- Expanse: 46-48 mm
- Habitat: The Himalayas from Mussoorie to Bhutan; the hills of Assam, Upper Burma and Western China.

== See also ==
- List of butterflies of India
- List of butterflies of India (Riodinidae)
