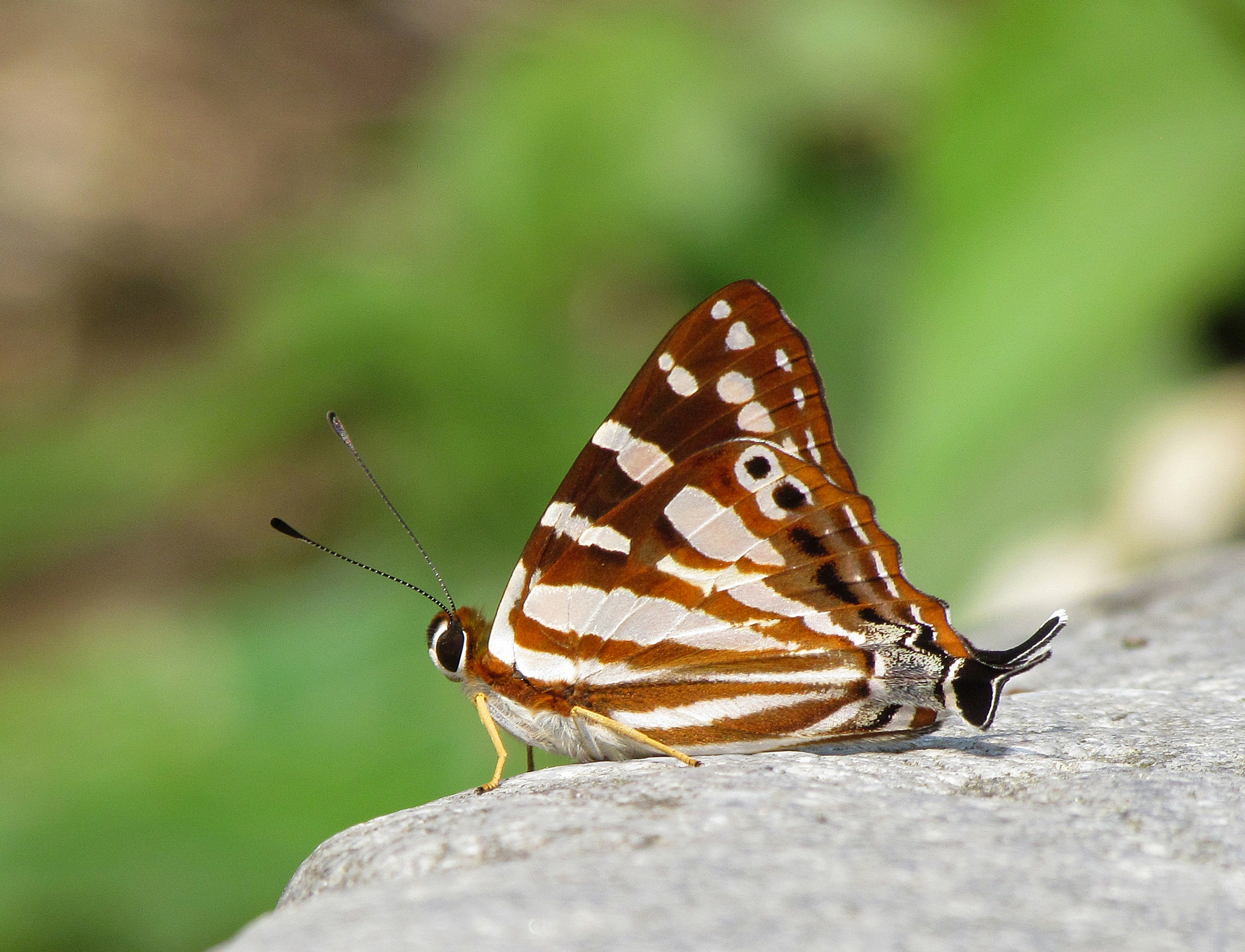
- Ventral View
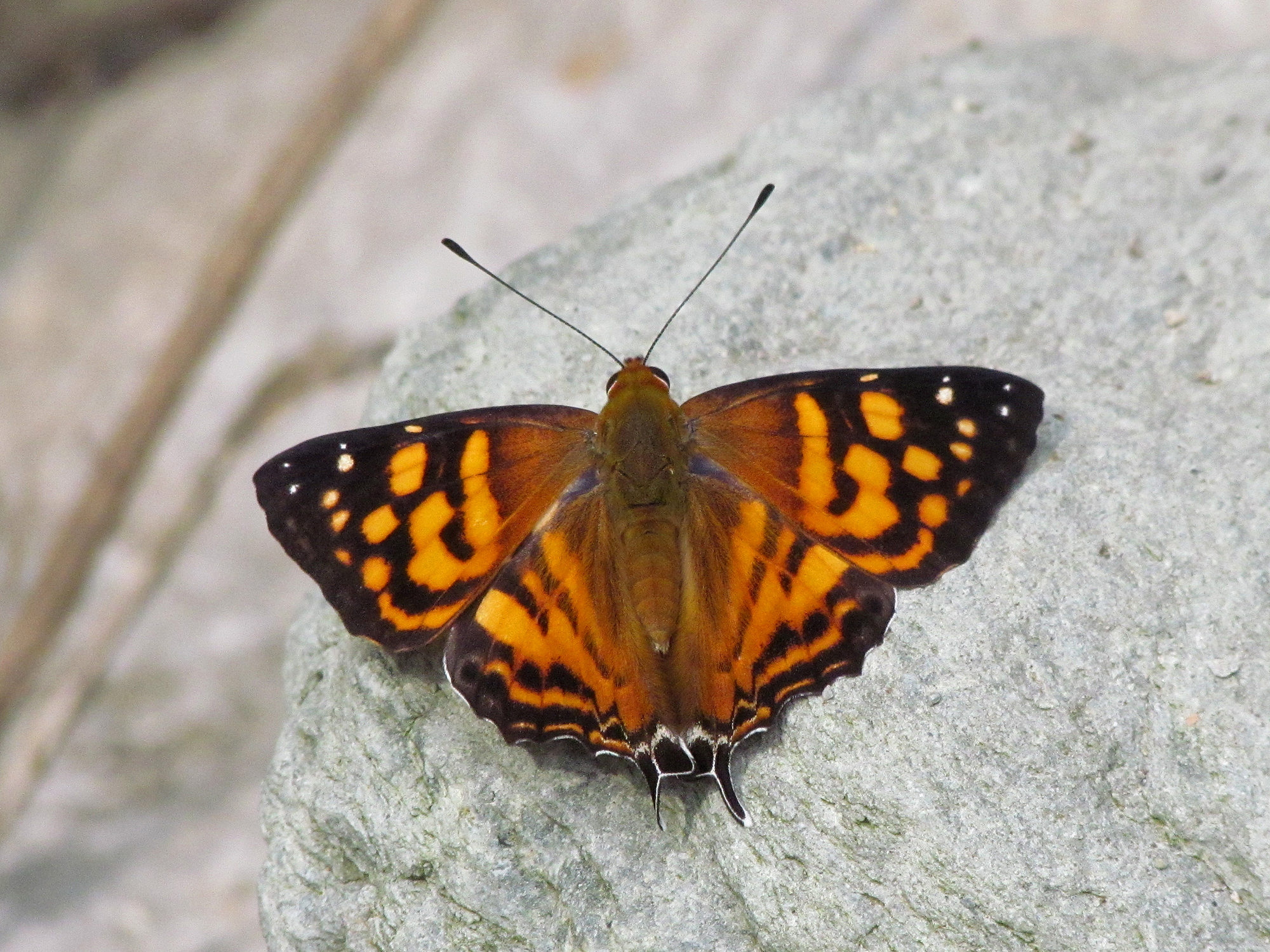
- Dorsal View

Scientific classification
- Kingdom: Animalia
- Phylum: Arthropoda
- Class: Insecta
- Order: Lepidoptera
- Family: Riodinidae
- Genus: Dodona
- Species: D. egeon

Binomial name
- Dodona egeon (Westwood, 1851)

= Dodona egeon =

Orange Punch

Species of butterfly

Dodona egeon, the orange Punch, is a small but striking butterfly found in the Indomalayan realm - in Mussoorie to Assam, Burma (nominate) and Peninsular Malaya (D. e. confluens Corbet, 1941) that belongs to the family Riodinidae (which is also known as the Punches and Judies in India).

== Description ==
From Charles Thomas Bingham (1905) The Fauna of British India, Including Ceylon and Burma Butterflies Volume I:

Male. Upperside. Fore wing black, the basal area to the middle of the cell dark ochraceous red; a short, broad, oblique yellow subbasal band from subcostal vein to vein 1; discal yellow spots beyond in interspaces 1, 2, 4 and 5, the upper two and lower two spots respectively separated by the veins only, the latter two spots joined to the subbasal band by an elongate reddish-yellow spot in interspace la; a postdiscal series of a yellow crescent marks surmounted by a yellow spot in interspaces 2 and 3, and three upper postdiscal whitish smaller spots in interspaces 4, 5, 6 shifted somewhat further towards the termen; lastly, two preapical white dots. Hindwing ochraceous yellow, the dorsal margin broadly shaded with brown, a medial straight fascia and an upper shorter discal fascia dark brown; a postdiscal macular, subterminal and terminal more continuous dark brown bands, all three coalescing at the apex; tornal lobe and slender tail black. Underside chestnut-red, with the following more or less silvery markings;Fore wing: a short streak at base of costal margin, transverse basal, medial and discal broad bands, a postdiscal irregular series of transverse spots and a very slender and delicate transverse series of short subterminal lines; between the discal and postdiscal markings there are two silvery subcostal and a transverse similar spot in interspace 3; the other markings are silvery anteriorly, ochraceous posteriorly. Hind wing: a short transverse silvery streak at base, a narrow similar streak along vein 1 not reaching the tornus, a silvery streak along the dorsal margin turning upwards and joining an interrupted discal silvery transverse fascia from the costa, a broader straight transverse medial band between the discal band and base of wing, a very broad elongate triangular upper postdiscal silvery patch, followed by a series of transverse slender black markings terminating at the apex in two black spots set in a quadrate silvery patch; lobe and slender tail jet-black, margined on the inner side by a white line and surmounted by a grey tornal patch. Antennae, head, thorax and abdomen blackish brown; beneath, palpi, thorax and abdomen greyish white.

- Female. Upperside brownish black, much paler than in the male; markings similar but very much larger and paler, especially the upper postdiscal spots on the fore wing. Underside similar to that of the male; groundcolour paler, silvery markings much broader.
- Expanse: 44-50 mm
- Habitat: Himalayas, Kashmir to Bhutan; Assam, Khasi and Naga Hills.

== See also ==
- List of butterflies of India
- List of butterflies of India (Riodinidae)
