= Aubertin (surname) =

Aubertin is a surname. Notable people with the surname include:

- Martial Aubertin (1775–1824), French stage actor and dramatist
- Daphne Aubertin (1902–1970), British malacologist and entomologist
- Bernard Aubertin (1934–2015), French artist
- Philippe Aubertin (born 1969), French sprint canoeist
- Valéry Aubertin (born 1970), French organist
