= Ronald A. Senior-White =

British entomologist

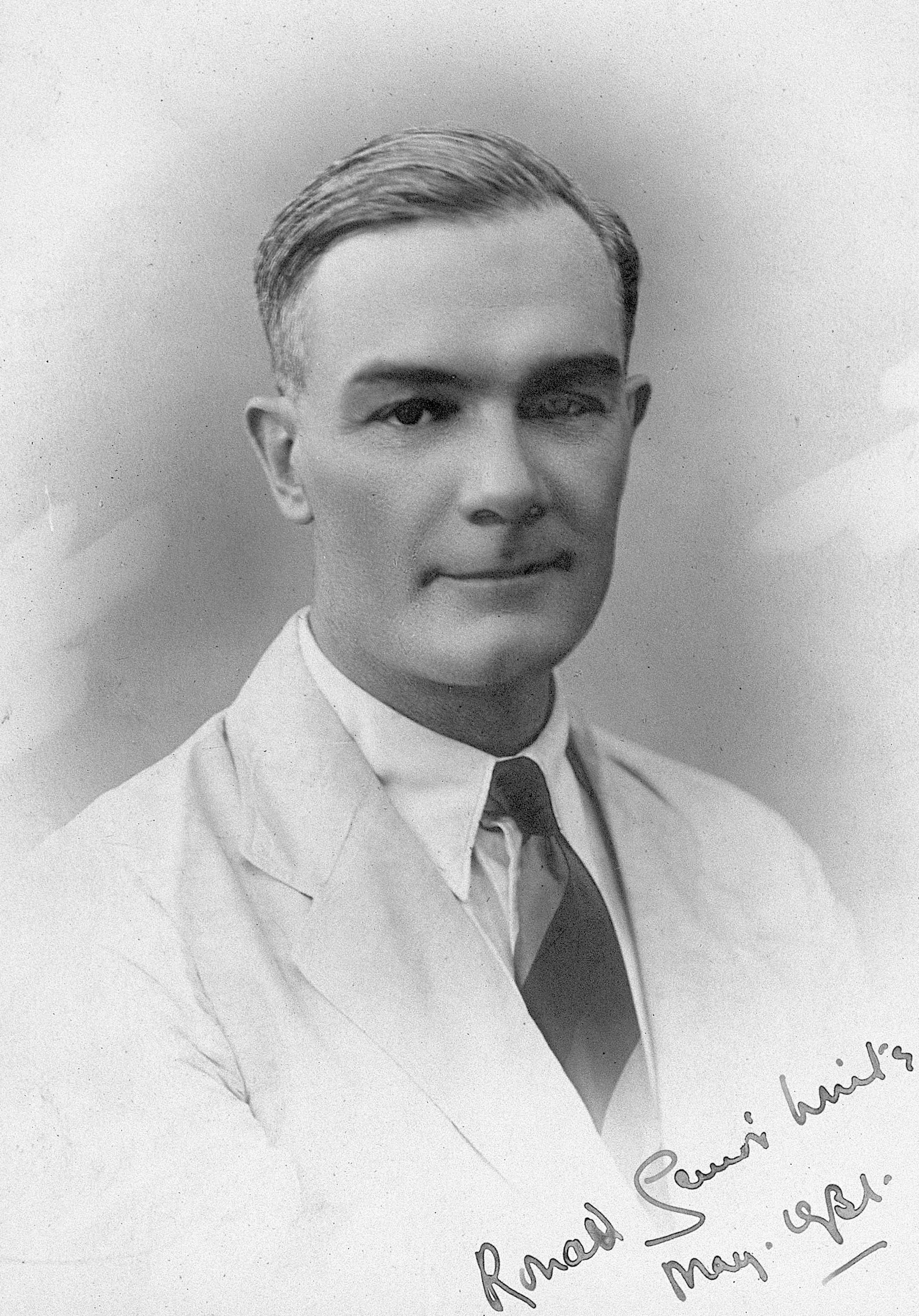
Ronald A. Senior-White in 1931

Ronald A. Senior-White FRSE FRES (1891–30 October 1954) was an English entomologist and malariologist who worked in India and Ceylon. His entomological studies concerned Diptera, especially the mosquitoes.

== Biography ==
Little is known of Senior-White's life. He was probably the son of a tea plantation owner.

He moved to Suruganga in Ceylon in 1917 to manage a tea plantation, and became interested in mosquitoes. He moved to Calcutta, India and from 1928 to 1947 he served as a malariologist with the Bengal Nagpur Railway. He collected diptera and wrote extensively. He wrote the volume on Calliphoridae in the Fauna of British India series. He collaborated with Daphne Aubertin and John Smart (1907-1986) of the natural history department of the British Museum.

In 1928 he was elected a Fellow of the Royal Society of Edinburgh. His proposers were James Hartley Ashworth, John Stephenson, Robert Stewart MacDougall and James Ritchie.

In the Second World War he joined the Indian Medical Service and rose to the rank of Major.

In 1947 aged 56 he and took up a position as government entomologist in Trinidad, studying Anopheles species (esp. A. apuasalis). He was a member of the Royal Society of Edinburgh from 1928.

He died in Trinidad on 30 October 1954.

== Publications ==
=== On entomology (Diptera) ===
- Indian Diptera (MemAgr) (1922)
- New Ceylon Diptera (Part II). Spolia Zeylan. 13: 195–206. (1922)
- Notes on Indian Diptera. 1. Diptera from the Khasia Hills. 2. Tabanidae in the collection of the forest zoologist. 3. New species of Diptera from the Indian Region. Mem. Dep. Agric. India Entomol. Ser. 7: 83–170. (1922)[This work was issued as an entire fascicle (No. 9) and is preceded by 6 pages consisting of title page and other matter.]
- The Muscidae testaceae of the Oriental Region. (With descriptions of those found within Indian limits.). Spolia Zeylan. 12: 294–314. (1923)
- A revision of the sub-family Sarcophaginae in the Oriental Region. Rec. Indian Mus. 26: 193–283. (1924).
- New and little known Oriental Tachinidae. Spolia Zeylan. 13: 103–19. (1924).
- A revision of the sub-family Calliphorinae in the Oriental Region. Rec. Indian Mus. 28: 127–40. (1926.)
- With D. Aubertin & J. Smart Diptera. Family Calliphoridae. In: Sewell, R.B.S., ed., The fauna of British India, including the remainder of the Oriental Region. Vol. VI. Taylor & Francis, Ltd., London. xii + 288 p. (1940).

=== On malaria ===
- Physical factors in mosquito ecology. Bulletin of Entomological Research, 16, 187–248. (1926)
- With Knowles, Robert, Malaria: Its Investigation and Control, with Special Reference to Indian Conditions. Calcutta: Thacker, Spink and Co. ( 1927).
- With Hackett L.W., Russell P.F. and Scharff JW The present use of naturalistic measures in the control of malaria. Bulletin of the Health Organisation of the League of Nations, Vol 7, pp 1046–1064. (1938)
- With Adhikari AK, On malaria transmission around the Chilika lake. J. Mal. Inst. India 2: 395–423. (1939).
- On the anthrophilic indices of some Anopheles found in east central India. Indian J. Malariol. 1947; 1 : 111–222. (1947)
- With Kirkpatrick, T.W.Transport of insects on the exterior of aircraft. Nature 164 (1949) 60 – 61. (1949).
- Studies on the bionomics of Anopheles aquasalis Curry, 1932. Part I. Indian J. Malariol. 5: 293–403. (1951).
- Studies on the bionomics of Anopheles aquasalis Curry, 1932. Part II. Ind J Mal 6: 30–72. (1951).
- With Das Gupta, B.M. Studies in the parasitology of malaria. Indian Med. Res. Memoirs No. 18:1–436. (1930).
