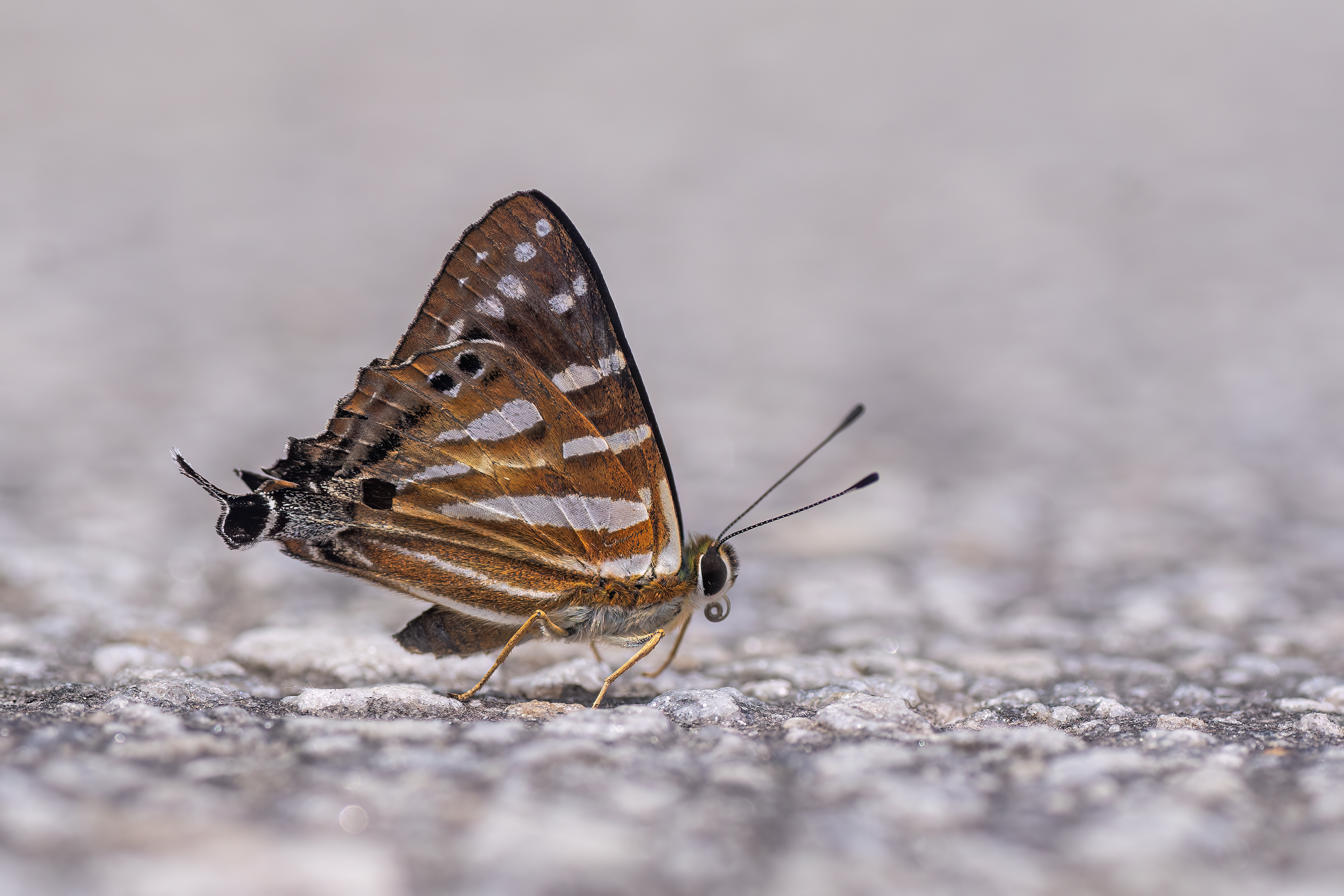

Scientific classification
- Kingdom: Animalia
- Phylum: Arthropoda
- Class: Insecta
- Order: Lepidoptera
- Family: Riodinidae
- Genus: Dodona
- Species: D. eugenes

Binomial name
- Dodona eugenes Bates, [1868]

= Dodona eugenes =

Tailed Punch

Species of butterfly

Dodona eugenes, the tailed Punch, is a small but striking species of butterfly found in the Indomalayan realm that belongs to the Punches and Judies, that is, the family Riodinidae.

== Description ==
From Charles Thomas Bingham (1905) The Fauna of British India, Including Ceylon and Burma, Butterflies, Vol. 1:

Male: Upperside: closely resembles D. dipaea in the ground-colour and markings, but on the hind wing the markings are broader and more diffuse, and the lobe has a short filamentous black white-edged tail. Underside a brighter brown than in D. dipaea; the markings very similar, but twice as broad.

- Expanse: 38-49 mm
- Habitat: The Himalayas from Murree to Bhutan; Assam, the Khasi and Jaintia Hills.
- Larva: More or less onisciform, pale emerald-green with two dorsal blue lines somewhat sparingly covered with short hairs, it Feeds on grasses and hill-bamboo.
- Pupa: pale green, with cross check o£ darker green lines. Head bifid, flat in front and angulated below.

== Subspecies ==
- D. e. eugenes Sikkim to Assam to Burma, Tibet, Himalayas (west as far as Murree), Northeast India (hills), North Thailand, Indo China, West China.
- D. e. chaseni Corbet, 1941 Peninsular Malaya
- D. e. venox Fruhstorfer, 1912 Sikkim, Assam, Yunnan
- D. e. esakii Shirôzu, 1953 Formosa
- D. e. formosana Matsumura, 1919 Taiwan

== See also ==
- List of butterflies of India
- List of butterflies of India (Riodinidae)

== Biology ==
The larva feeds on Adundinaria
