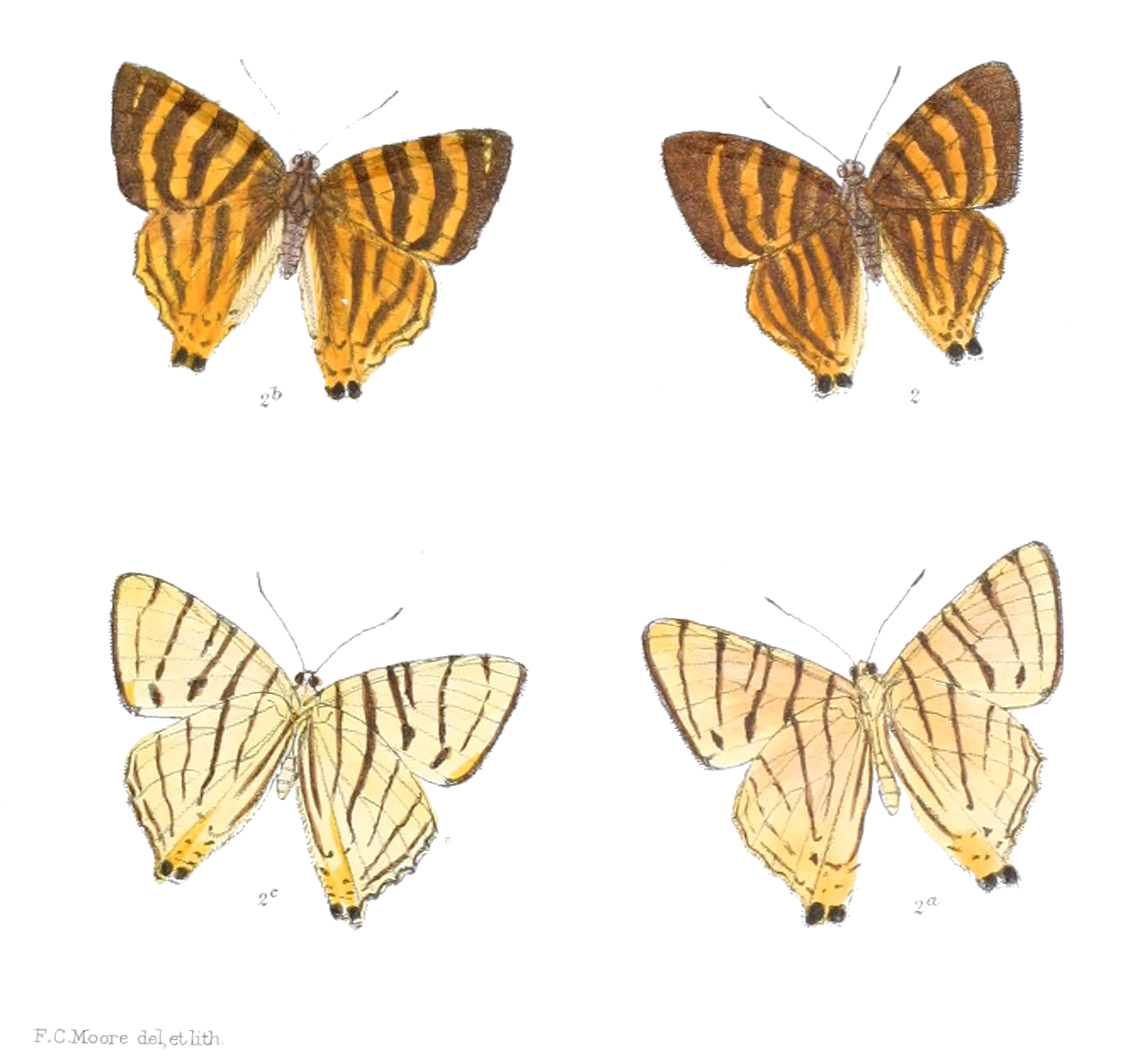

Scientific classification
- Kingdom: Animalia
- Phylum: Arthropoda
- Class: Insecta
- Order: Lepidoptera
- Family: Riodinidae
- Genus: Dodona
- Species: D. adonira

Binomial name
- Dodona adonira (Hewitson, 1865)

= Dodona adonira =

Striped Punch

Species of butterfly

Dodona adonira, the striped Punch, is a small but striking butterfly found in the Indomalayan realm that belongs to the Punches and Judies, that is, the family Riodinidae.

== Description ==
From Charles Thomas Bingham (1905) The Fauna of British India, Including Ceylon and Burma, Butterflies, Vol. 1

Males and females have the upperside dark brownish black, forewing with the base suffused slightly with ochraceous; subbasal, discal and post-discal transverse orange bands, the subbasal straight, the other two slightly curved, sinuous and somewhat macular, the subbasal and discal bands joined posteriorly in interspace 1 a: Female with or without three or four transversely-placed upper subterminal orange-yellow spots. Hindwing: a pale yellow fascia, parallel to the dorsal margin; oblique subbasal, discal, postdiscal and inner and outer subterminal orange-yellow fasciae, all, except the post-discal, converging from the costa and meeting above the tornal lobe; the postdiscal fascia broad at costal margin, narrowing to a point-and terminating on vein 3; bilobed, the lobes margined outwardly by a very slender continuous white line, beyond which the cilia are black; the rest of the cilia on both forewings and hindwings ochraceous white in male, black in female. Underside ochraceous, suffused with a darker ochraceous on the tornal area of the hindwing. Forewings and hindwings transversely crossed by the following jet-black narrow bands. Forewing with basal, subbasal, inner and outer discal, postdiscal, subterminal and terminal bands; the inner discal band terminating on vein 1, the outer discal on vein 3; the postdiscal interrupted posteriorly on vein 2; the postdiscal and subterminal widened on the costa. Hindwing with a band along vein 1; basal and subbasal bands in continuation of those on the forewing, the latter turning upwards above tornus and continued to the base of the wing parallel to the dorsal margin; a discal band from costa to vein 3, a very slender postdiscal band from costa to dorsum, and closely approximate sub terminal and terminal bands; the postdiscal slender band or line twice interrupted across the tornal area; lobes black, narrowly edged with white on the outer side. Antennae dark brown annulated with white; head, thorax and abdomen dark brown; beneath, palpi, thorax and abdomen ochraceous white.

- Expanse: 43-47 mm
- Habitat: Nepal; Sikkim over 5000 ft.; Assam, the Khasi and Naga Hills; Upper Myanmar.

== Subspecies ==
- D. a. adonira Sikkim, Nepal, Sikkim, Northeast India (hills), North Burma
- D. a. kala Tytler, 1940 Northeast Burma
- D. a. naga Tytler, 1940 Naga Hills, Manipur, Assam
- D. a. learmondi Tytler, 1940 Shan States, Yunnan
- D.a. argentea Fruhstorfer, 1904 Burma
- D. a. windu Fruhstorfer, 1894 West Java

== See also ==
- Riodinidae
- List of butterflies of India
- List of butterflies of India (Riodinidae)
