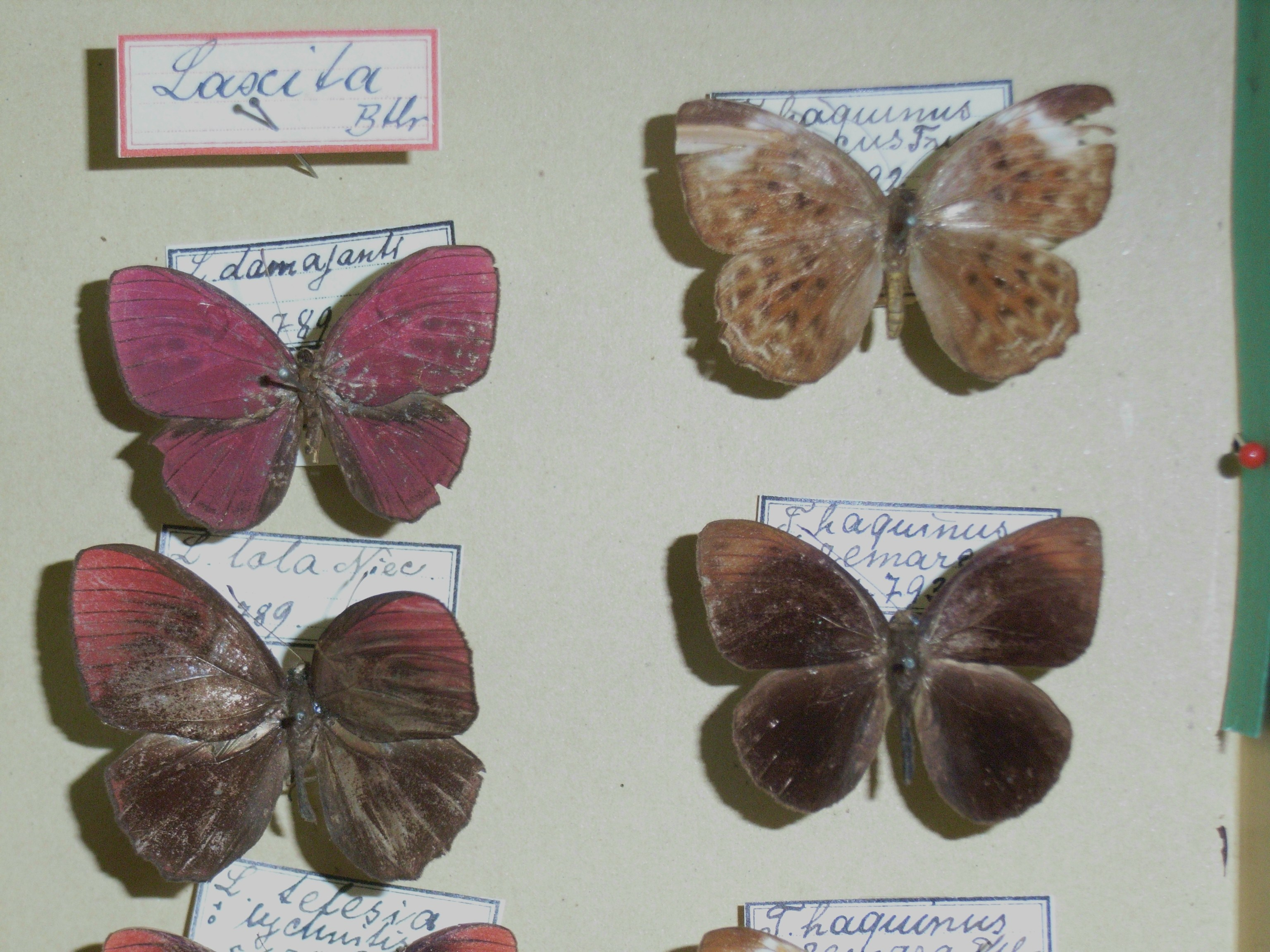
- Specimens in Museum Wiesbaden

Scientific classification
- Kingdom: Animalia
- Phylum: Arthropoda
- Clade: Pancrustacea
- Class: Insecta
- Order: Lepidoptera
- Family: Riodinidae
- Genus: Paralaxita
- Species: P. damajanti

Binomial name
- Paralaxita damajanti (Felder and Felder, 1860)

Synonyms
- Abisara damajanti C. & R. Felder, 1860; Laxita damajanti lola de Nicéville, 1894; Laxita damajanti batuensis Talbot, 1932; Laxita damajanti cyme Fruhstorfer, 1914; Laxita damajanti lasica Fruhstorfer, 1914; Taxila hewitsoni Röber, 1895

= Paralaxita damajanti =

Species of butterfly

Paralaxita damajanti, the Malay red harlequin, is an Indomalayan species in the butterfly family Riodinidae. It was described by Cajetan Felder and Rudolf Felder in 1860.

== Subspecies ==
- Paralaxita damajanti damajanti (Malaya, Borneo, Sumatra)
- Paralaxita damajanti lola (de Nicéville, 1894) (Borneo)
- Paralaxita damajanti batuensis (Talbot, 1932) (Batu Islands)
- Paralaxita damajanti cyme (Fruhstorfer, 1914) (Borneo to Sintang)
- Paralaxita damajanti lasica (Fruhstorfer, 1914) ("Bangka"?)
- Paralaxita damajanti hewitsoni (Röber, 1895) (southern Borneo)
