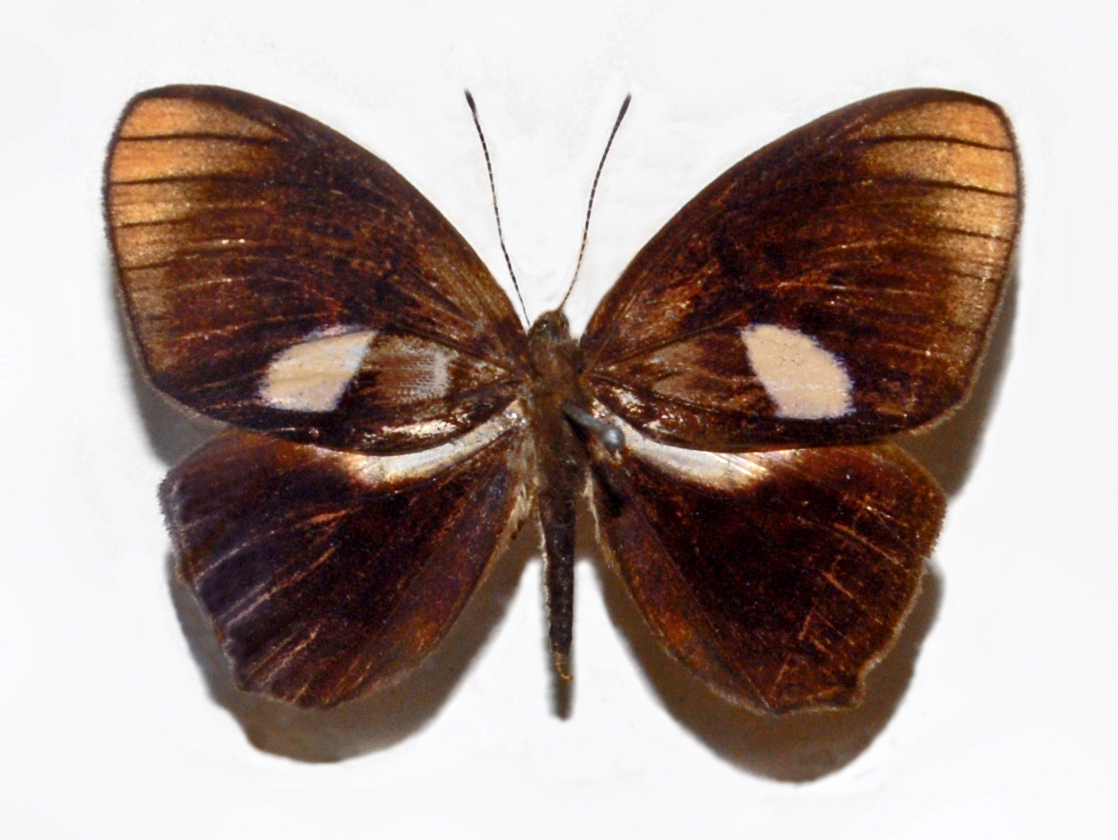
- Mounted specimen from Borneo
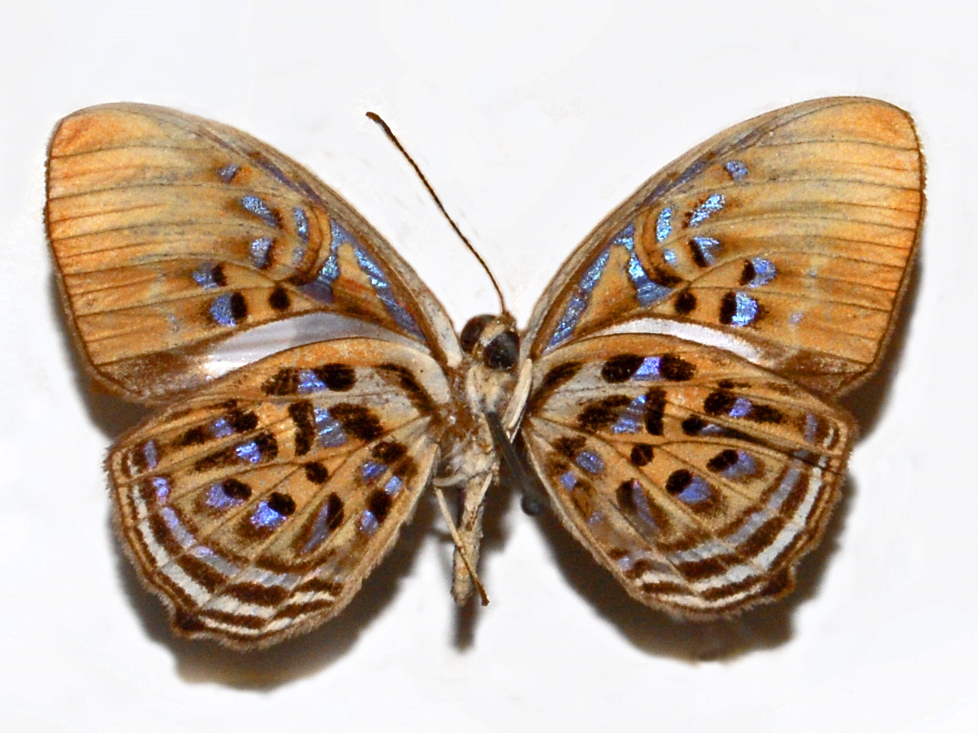
- Underside

Scientific classification
- Kingdom: Animalia
- Phylum: Arthropoda
- Class: Insecta
- Order: Lepidoptera
- Family: Riodinidae
- Genus: Paralaxita
- Species: P. telesia

Binomial name
- Paralaxita telesia (Hewitson, 1861)

Synonyms
- Taxila telesia Hewitson, 1861; Laxita lyclene de Nicéville, 1894; Laxita telesia ines Fruhstorfer, 1904; Laxita telesia lychnitis Fruhstorfer, 1904; Laxita telesia pistyrus Fruhstorfer, 1914

= Paralaxita telesia =

Species of butterfly

Paralaxita telesia, the common red harlequin, is a species in the butterfly family Riodinidae.

== Subspecies ==
- Paralaxita telesia lyclene (de Nicéville, 1894) - Peninsular Malaya, southern Thailand
- Paralaxita telesia boulleti (Fruhstorfer, [1914]) – Thailand
- Paralaxita telesia lychnitis (Fruhstorfer, 1904) - north-eastern Sumatra
- Paralaxita telesia pistyrus (Fruhstorfer, 1914) south-eastern Borneo
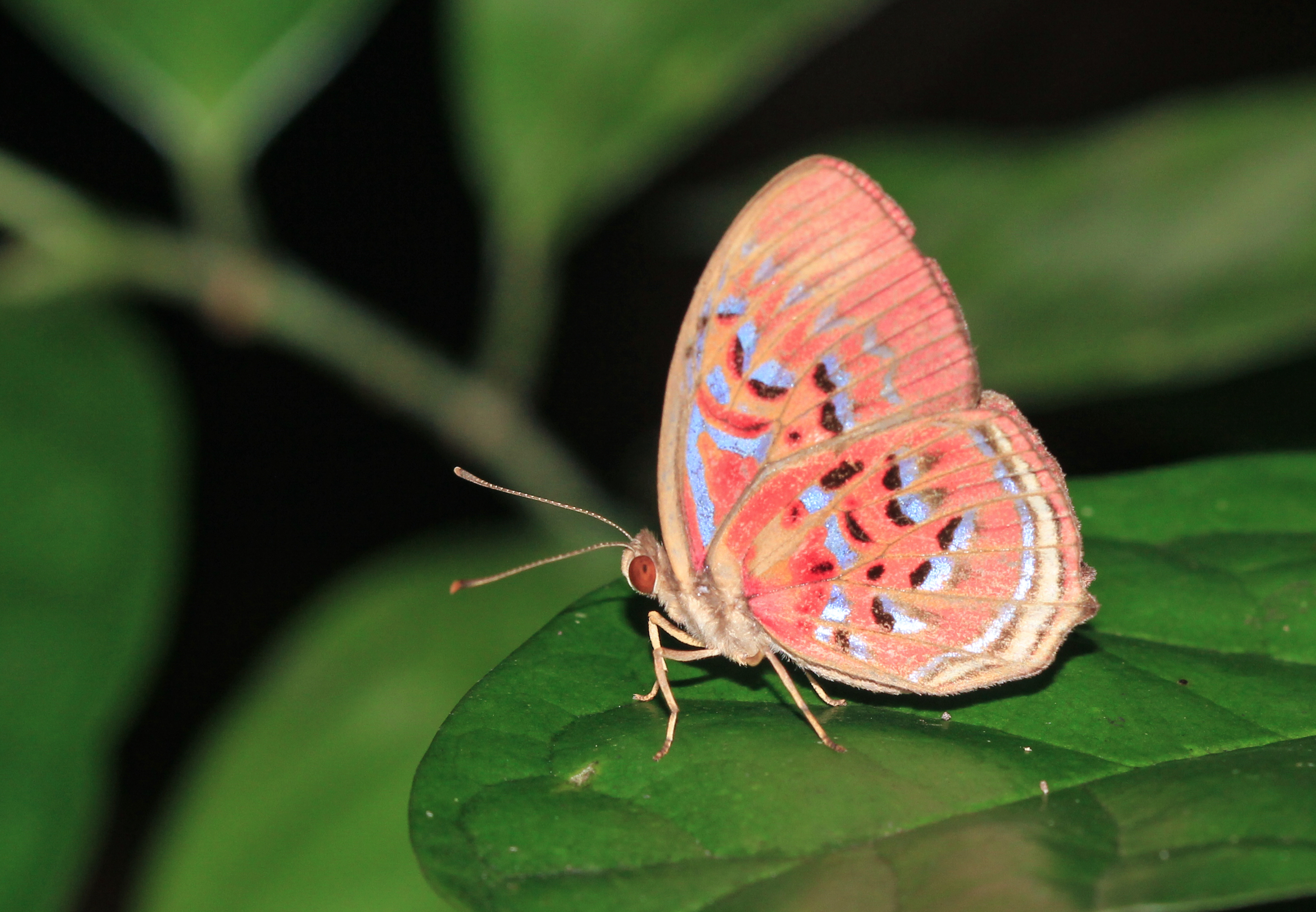
  Common red Harlequin (Paralaxita telesia) from South Vietnam

== Description ==
Paralaxita telesia has a wingspan of about 35–45 millimetres (1.4–1.8 in). In males both wings are mainly dark brown, with a crimson apex and a whitish large spot on the forewings. Underside is carmine with bands and spots of blue and black. The apex of the forewings is rufous. Hindwings are crossed near the outer margin by a band of light blue and a band of light yellow, each bordered with black.

== Distribution ==
This species can be found in the Peninsular Malaya, Laos, Vietnam, Thailand, Borneo and Sumatra.

== Gallery ==
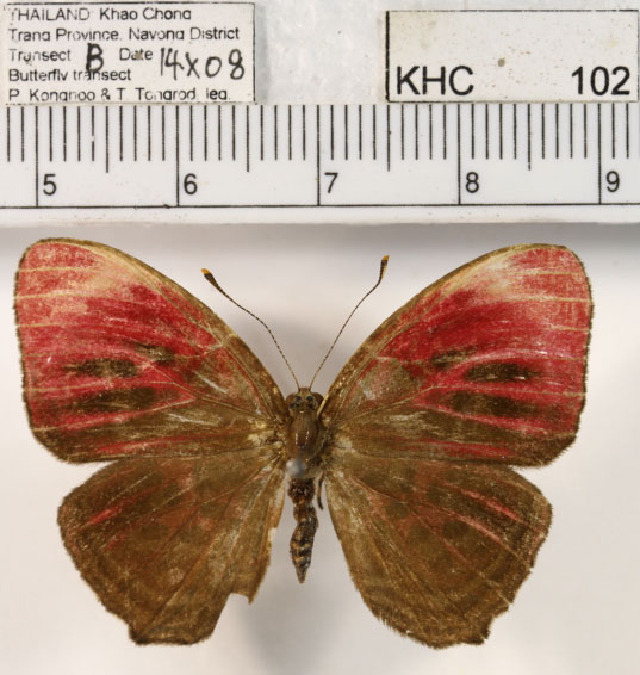
P. t. boulleti female, dorsal view

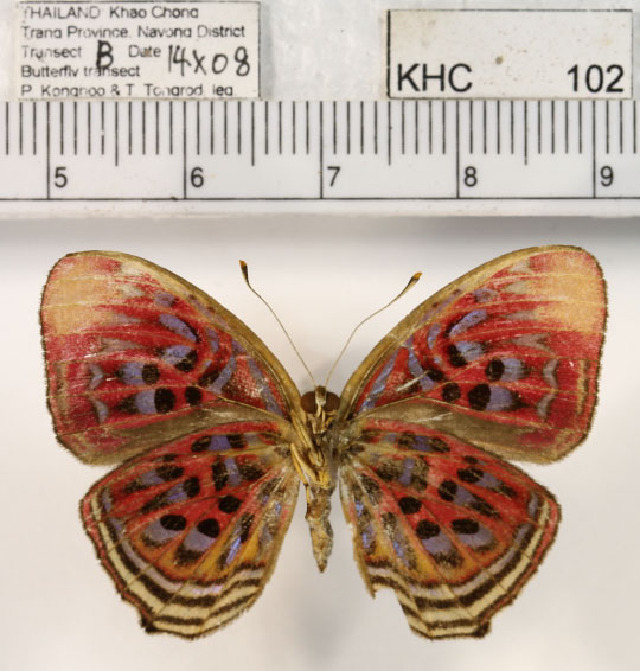
P. t. boulleti, female, ventral view

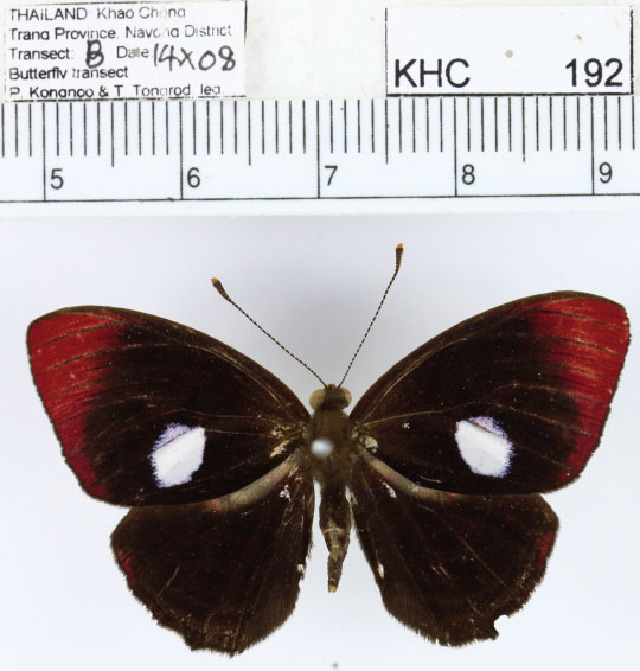
P. t. boulleti, male, dorsal view

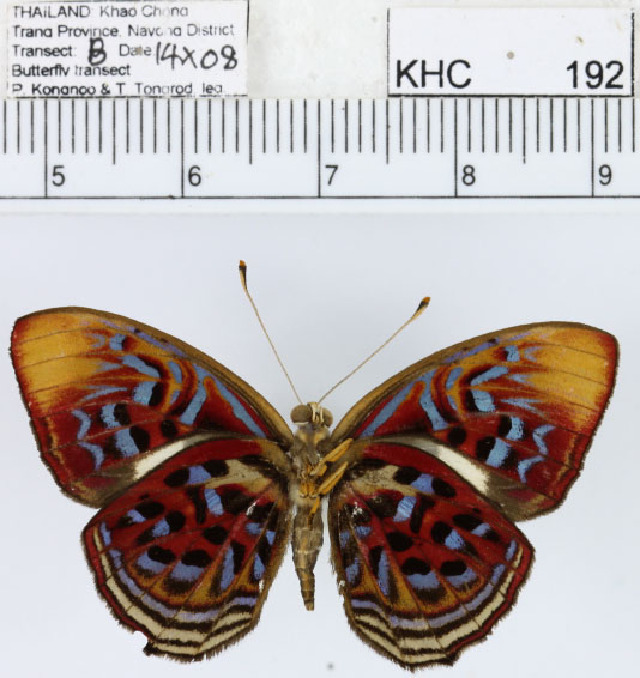
P. t. boulleti, male, ventral view
