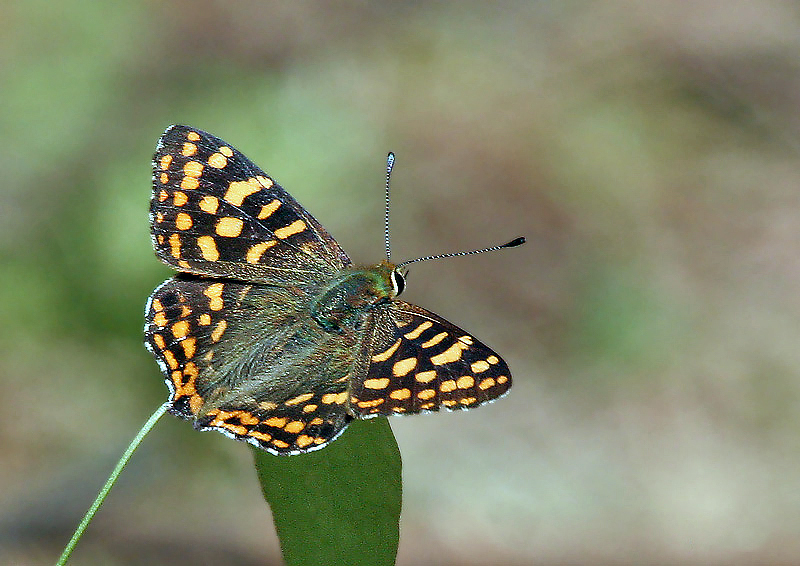

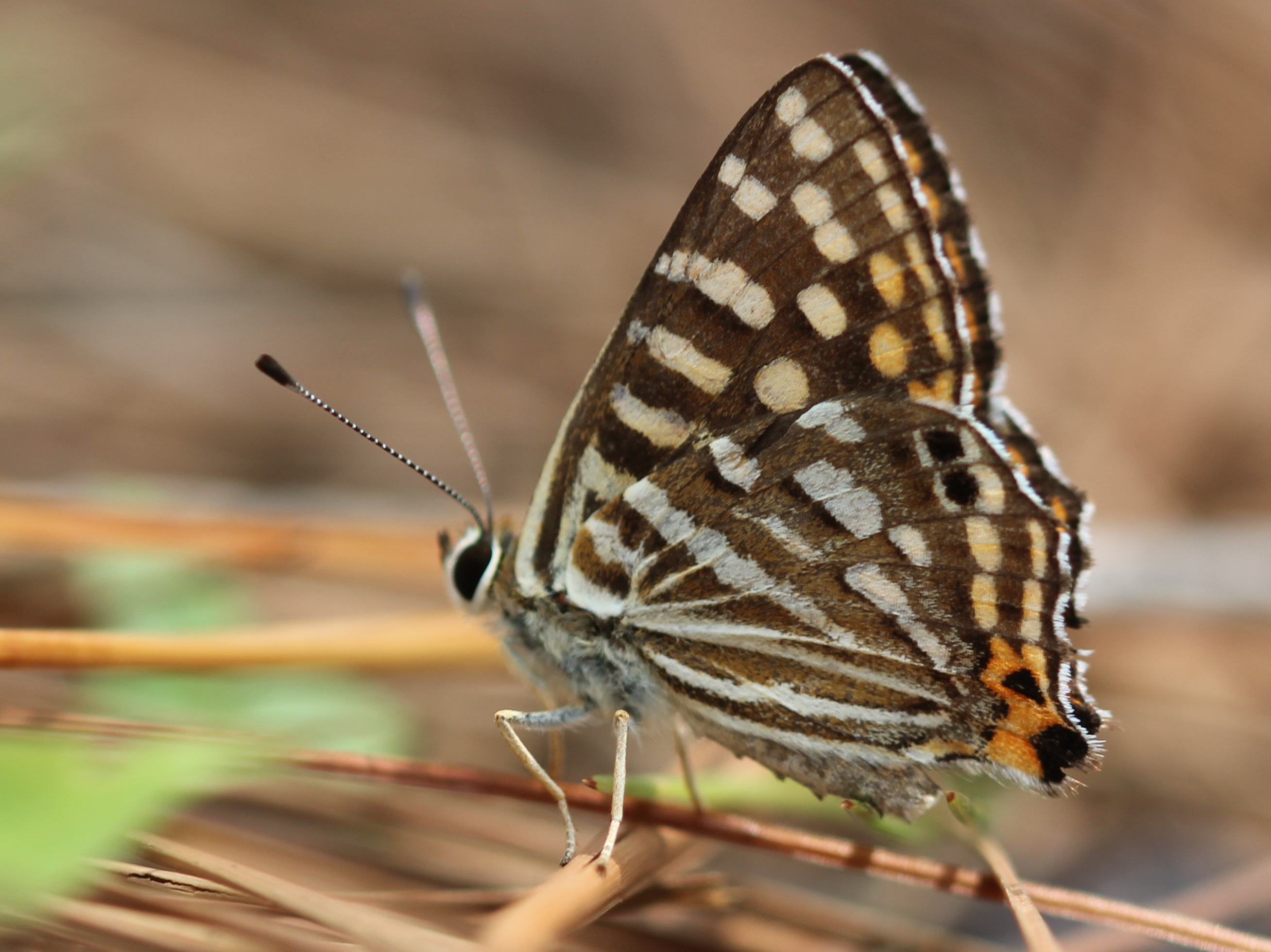

Scientific classification
- Kingdom: Animalia
- Phylum: Arthropoda
- Class: Insecta
- Order: Lepidoptera
- Family: Riodinidae
- Genus: Dodona
- Species: D. durga

Binomial name
- Dodona durga (Kollar & Redtenbacher, 1844)

= Dodona durga =

Common Punch

Species of butterfly

Dodona durga, the common Punch, is a small but striking butterfly found in the Indomalayan realm (Tibet, Chitral to Nepal, West China, Central China) that belongs to the Punches and Judies, that is, the family Riodinidae.

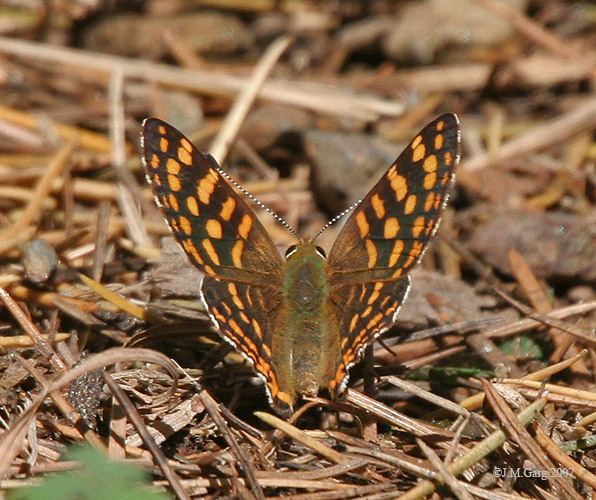
in Kullu district of Himachal Pradesh, India

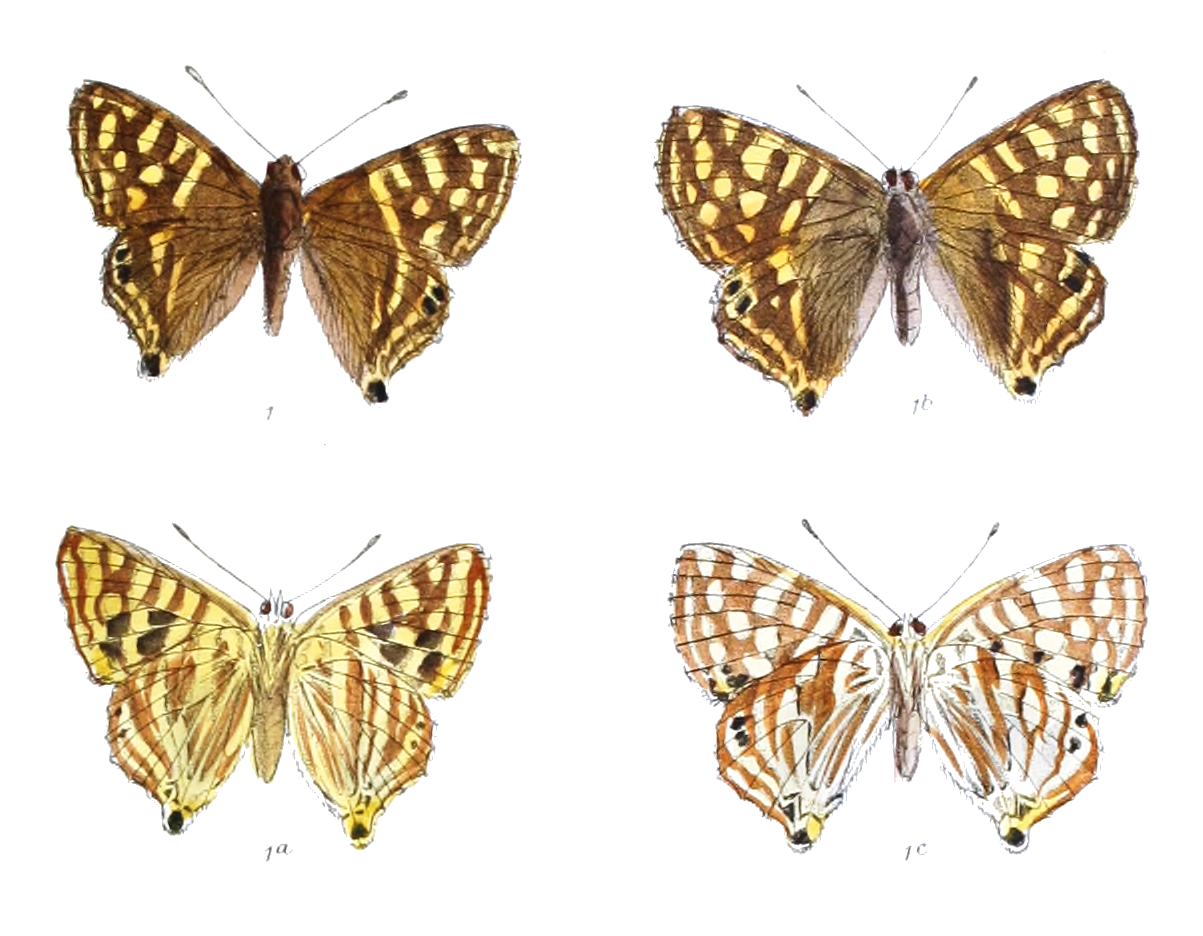

== Description ==
From Charles Thomas Bingham (1905) The Fauna of British India, Including Ceylon and Burma, Butterflies, Vol. 1

Male Upperside vandyke-brown, spotted and marked with ochra-ceous and black as follows: Fore wing has a transverse band crossing the middle of the cell, continued to vein 1; a similar band at apex of cell continued below as a round spot in interspace 2 and a transverse spot in interspace 1; a macular similar band beyond apex of cell; three upper discal spots in interspaces 3, 6 and 8, followed by a sinuous transverse inner subterminal series of small spots and an outer subterminal series of transversely linear spots. Hind wing: a small spot in interspace 7, two spots beyond apex of cell continued towards the tornus in a series of more obscure smaller spots, and an inner and an outer transversely linear series of spots, the inner and outer spots in interspaces 5 and 6 with an intervening prominent black spot, a similar black spot also in interspace 1 and another on the lobe of the tornus. Underside has the veins on the basal halves of wings pale ochraceous white; ground-colour ochraceous brown, with pale ochraceous-white markings as follow:—Fore wing: a streak along basal half of costal margin, a patch at base of cell centred with a small triangle of the ground-colour, a broad oblique band across middle of cell continued below towards the dorsum, similar bands at apex and just beyond, apex of cell, with a spot below them near base of interspace 2, a transverse discal series of spots in interspaces 1, 3, 6 and 8; a transverse uneven postdiscal series and a subterminal transverse linear row of spots, the last extending from interspaces 1 to 5; the lower spots of the postdiscal and subterminal series bright ochraceous, with some obscure blackish spots on the inner side of the former and at the tornus. Hind wing: a narrow streak along the dorsal margin, another across interspaces 1 a and 1, with a forked similar streak along vein 1; none of these reaching the tornus; a patch at base of wing enclosing a large spot of the ground-colour; an oblique band from costa crossing the middle of the cell, an interrupted similar band crossing the apex of the cell, very slender along the disco-cellulars; two upper discal short streaks in echelon; subterminal black spots in interspaces 1 a, 1, 4 and 5, the former two bordered internally with ochraceous, the latter two encircled with while; a transverse line of white between the lower two and upper two black spots, and another short terminal similar line between vein 1 and vein 0; cilia of both wings white alternated with brown. Antennae, head, thorax and abdomen brown: beneath, the palpi, thorax and abdomen whitish, the palpi tipped with black.

- Female. similar, larger; ground-colour slightly paler; markings whiter and broader.
- Expanse: 30-42 mm
- Habitat: The Himalayas, Kashmir to Nepal

== See also ==
- Riodinidae
- List of butterflies of India
- List of butterflies of India (Riodinidae)
