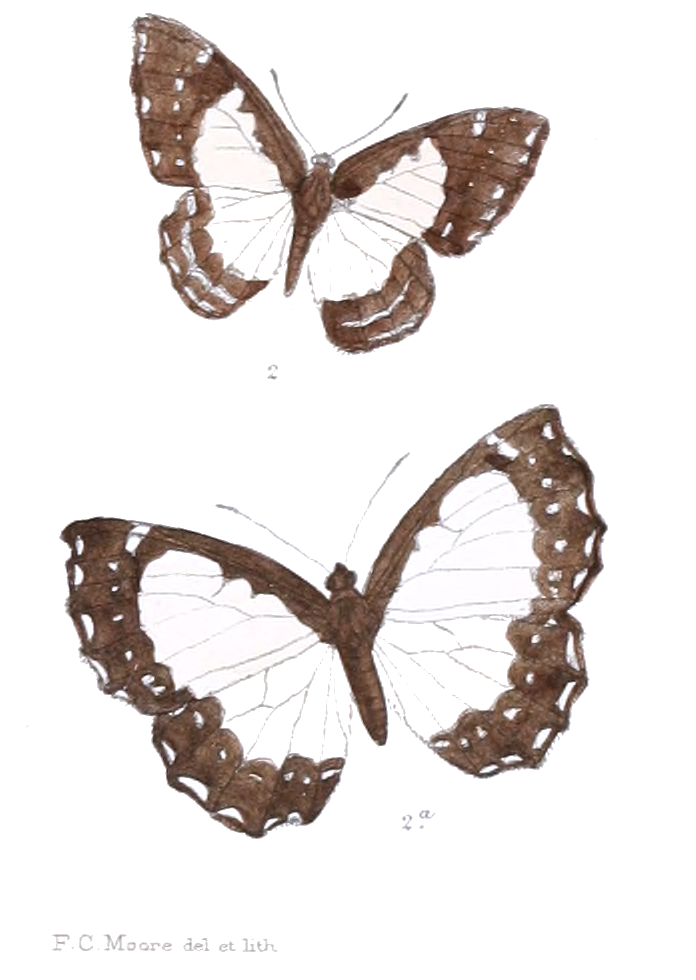

Scientific classification
- Kingdom: Animalia
- Phylum: Arthropoda
- Clade: Pancrustacea
- Class: Insecta
- Order: Lepidoptera
- Family: Riodinidae
- Subfamily: Nemeobiinae
- Tribe: Nemeobiini
- Subtribe: Nemeobiina
- Genus: Stiboges
- Species: S. nymphidia

Binomial name
- Stiboges nymphidia (Guerin, 1843)

= Stiboges nymphidia =

Columbine

Species of butterfly

Stiboges nymphidia, the columbine, is a small but striking butterfly found in the Indomalayan realm that belongs to metalmark butterflies (family Riodinidae), related to Punches and Judies. It is the sole member of the genus Stiboges Butler, 1876.

== Description ==
The male upper wing is pure white, base of wings narrowly, costal margin of forewing very broadly; with the apical and terminal third of the forewing and terminal third of the hindwing black, the inner margin of this colour irregularly crenulate (scalloped). Forewing with subterminal and terminal very incomplete transverse series of white spots, the anterior two of the former series bring the largest. Hindwing with a subterminal undulated pale line, in some specimens white where it crosses the veins, and a terminal series of white lunules. Cilia white alternated with black. Underside similar, the markings generally more clearly defined, the pale subterminal line on the hindwing replaced by a line of obscure minute spots. Antennae black with white rings at the articulations; head, thorax and abdomen black; beneath, the palpi and abdomen white, the thorax black.

Female is similar to the male, but the forewing with the black apical and terminal areas proportionately narrower; hindwing with a series of spots instead of the subterminal pale line on the upperside. Antennae, head, thorax and abdomen as in the male.

== Subspecies ==
- S. n. nymphidia — Assam to Peninsular Malaya, Bhutan, Naga Hills, Burma
- S. n. calycoides Fruhstorfer, 1897 — Java
- S. n. elodinia Fruhstorfer, 1914 — China, Indo-China
- S. n. mara Fruhstorfer, 1904 — Sumatra

== See also ==
- Riodinidae
- List of butterflies of India
- List of butterflies of India (Riodinidae)
