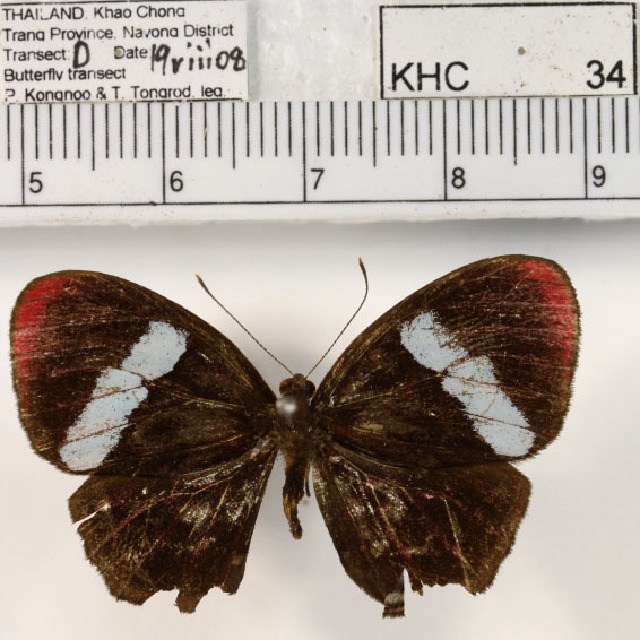

Scientific classification
- Kingdom: Animalia
- Phylum: Arthropoda
- Clade: Pancrustacea
- Class: Insecta
- Order: Lepidoptera
- Family: Riodinidae
- Genus: Paralaxita
- Species: P. orphna

Binomial name
- Paralaxita orphna (Boisduval, 1836)

Synonyms
- Emesis orphna Boisduval, 1836; Laxita nicevillei Röber, 1895; Laxita laocoon de Nicéville, 1894; Laxita lyncestis de Nicéville, 1894; Laxita orphna panyasis Fruhstorfer, 1914

= Paralaxita orphna =

Species of butterfly

Paralaxita orphna is an Indomalayan butterfly species in the family Riodinidae. It was described by Jean Baptiste Boisduval in 1836.

== Subspecies ==
- Paralaxita orphna orphna (Borneo, Pulau Laut, Palawan)
- Paralaxita orphna laocoon (de Nicéville, 1894) (Burma to Peninsular Malaya)
- Paralaxita orphna panyasis (Fruhstorfer, 1914) (Sumatra, Bangka)
