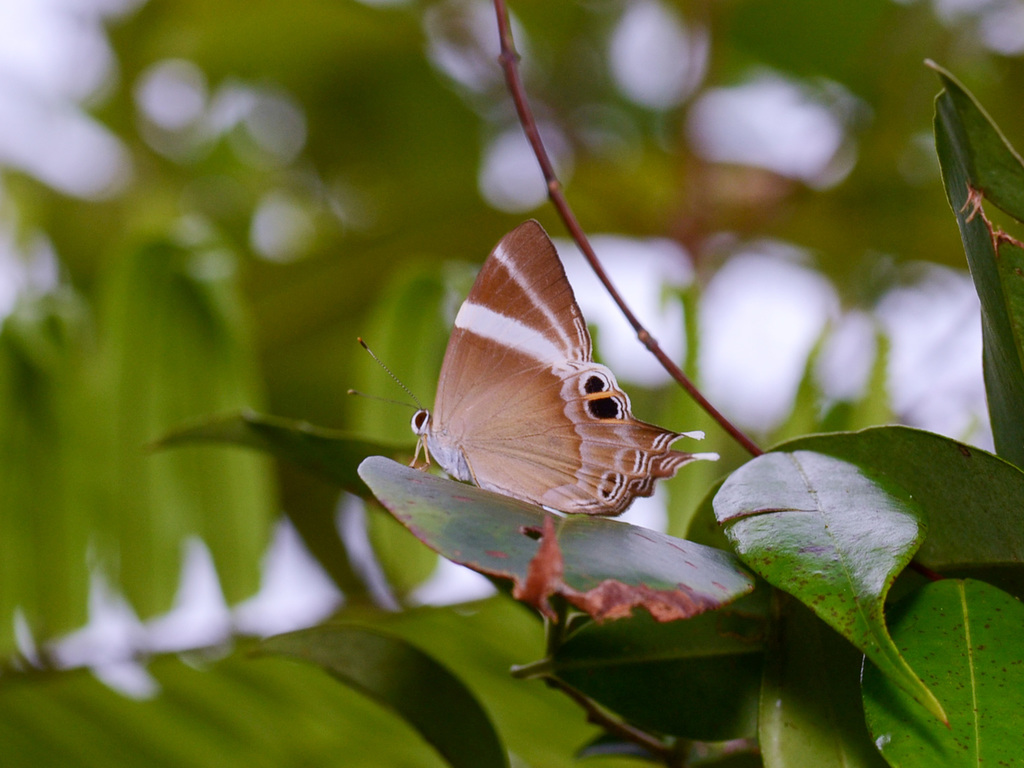

Scientific classification
- Kingdom: Animalia
- Phylum: Arthropoda
- Class: Insecta
- Order: Lepidoptera
- Family: Riodinidae
- Genus: Abisara
- Species: A. chelina

Binomial name
- Abisara chelina (Fruhstorfer, 1904)

Synonyms
- Sospita chela chelina Fruhstorfer, 1904

= Abisara chelina =

Species of butterfly

Abisara chelina is a butterfly in the family Riodinidae. It is found in southern Burma, Thailand, Peninsular Malaysia, Indo China and southern China.

== Subspecies ==
- Abisara chelina chelina (Yunnan)
- Abisara chelina duanhuii Huang, 2001 (south-eastern Tibet)
