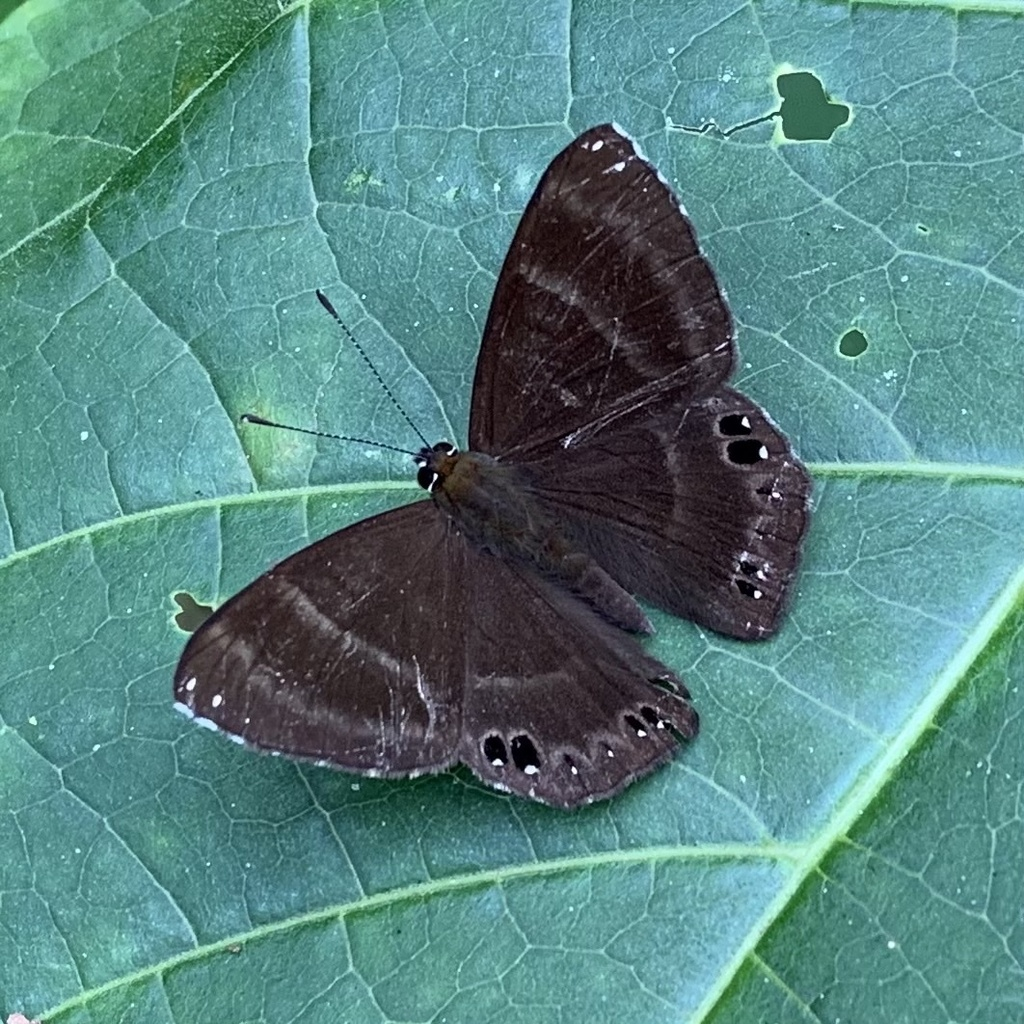

Scientific classification
- Kingdom: Animalia
- Phylum: Arthropoda
- Clade: Pancrustacea
- Class: Insecta
- Order: Lepidoptera
- Family: Riodinidae
- Genus: Abisara
- Species: A. freda

Binomial name
- Abisara freda Bennett, 1957

= Abisara freda =

Species of butterfly

Abisara freda or Lesser Judy, is a butterfly in the family Riodinidae. It is found in western China.

== Subspecies ==
- Abisara freda freda
- Abisara freda daliensis Sugiyama, 1992
