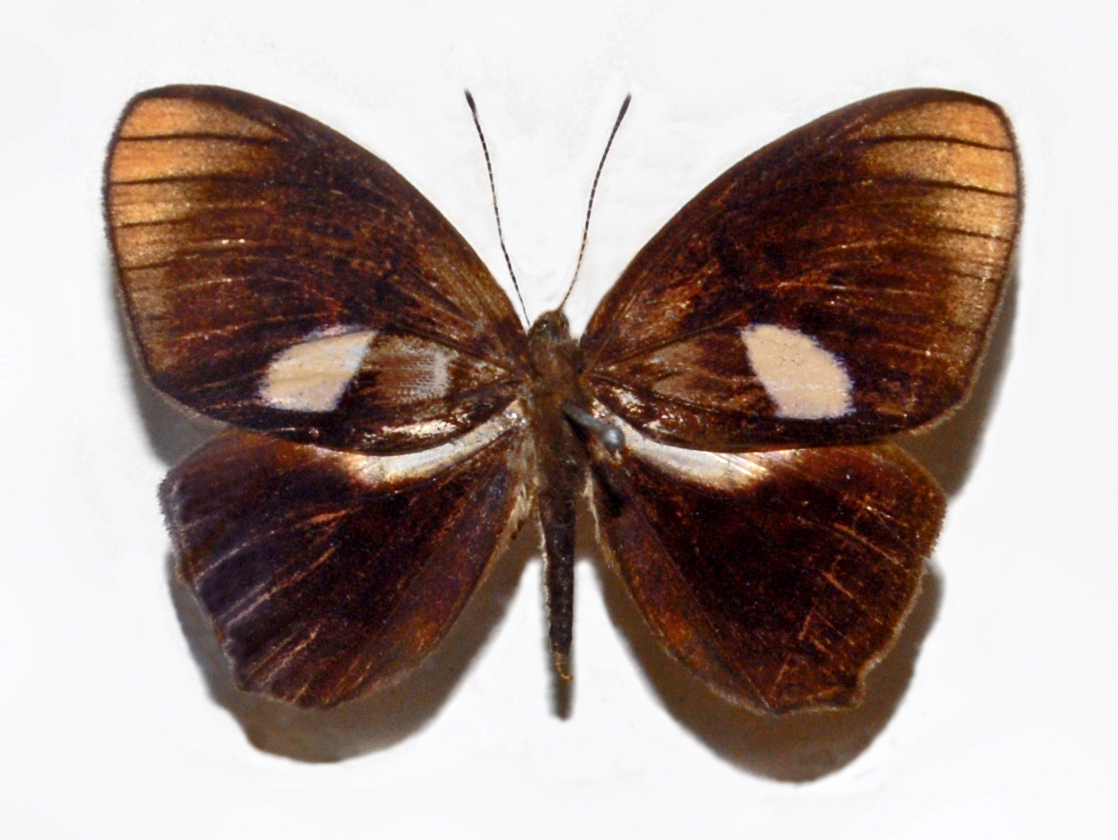
- Paralaxita telesia, mounted specimen

Scientific classification
- Kingdom: Animalia
- Phylum: Arthropoda
- Class: Insecta
- Order: Lepidoptera
- Family: Riodinidae
- Subfamily: Nemeobiinae
- Genus: Paralaxita; Eliot in Corbet & Pendlebury, 1978

= Paralaxita =

Genus of butterflies

Paralaxita is a genus in the butterfly family Riodinidae present only in Southeast Asia.

== Species ==
Lamas, 2008 recognizes the species:

- Paralaxita damajanti (Felder, C & R. Felder, 1860)
- Paralaxita hewitsoni (Röber, 1895)
- Paralaxita orphna (Boisduval, 1836)
- Paralaxita telesia (Hewitson, 1861)
