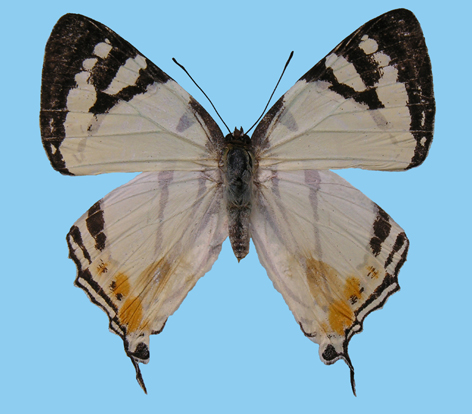
- Dodona deodata ohtsukai, female upperside
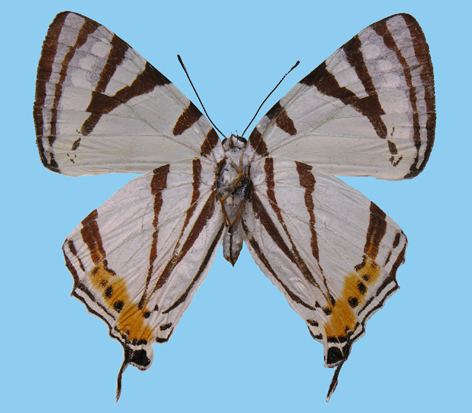
- Dodona deodata ohtsukai, female underside

Scientific classification
- Kingdom: Animalia
- Phylum: Arthropoda
- Class: Insecta
- Order: Lepidoptera
- Family: Riodinidae
- Genus: Dodona
- Species: D. deodata

Binomial name
- Dodona deodata (Hewitson, 1876)

= Dodona deodata =

Species of butterfly

Dodona deodata or Broad-banded Punch, is a small but striking butterfly found in the Indomalayan realm that belongs to the family Riodinidae. It was first described by William Chapman Hewitson in 1876.

== Subspecies ==
- D. d. deodata southern Yunnan
- D. d. anu Corbet, 1937 Peninsular Malaya
- D. d. longicaudata de Nicéville, 1881 Assam to Myanmar
- D. d. lecerfi Fruhstorfer, [1914] Vietnam
- D. d. sakaii Hayashi, 1976 Palawan
