= Dodona henrici =

White Punch

Scientific classification
- Domain: Eukaryota
- Kingdom: Animalia
- Phylum: Arthropoda
- Class: Insecta
- Order: Lepidoptera
- Family: Riodinidae
- Genus: Dodona
- Species: D. henrici

Binomial name
- Dodona henrici (Guerin, 1843)

Species of butterfly

Dodona henrici, the white Punch, is a small but striking butterfly found in India that belongs to the Punches and Judies, that is, the family Riodinidae.

== See also ==
- List of butterflies of India
- List of butterflies of India (Riodinidae)
