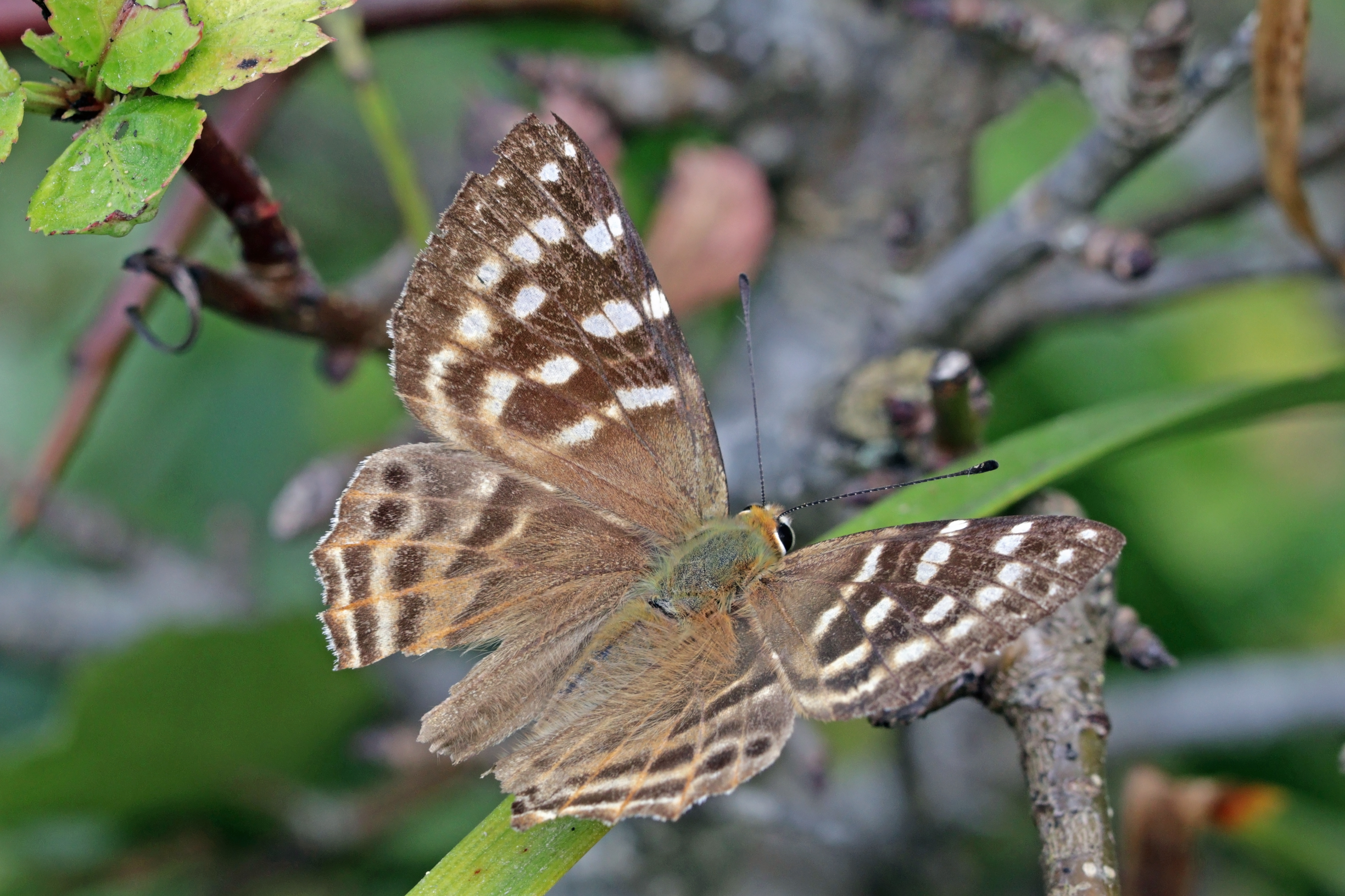
- Female Dodona eugenes in Godawari, Nepal

Scientific classification
- Domain: Eukaryota
- Kingdom: Animalia
- Phylum: Arthropoda
- Class: Insecta
- Order: Lepidoptera
- Family: Riodinidae
- Subfamily: Nemeobiinae
- Tribe: Zemerini
- Genus: Dodona; Hewitson, 1861

= Dodona (butterfly) =

Genus of butterflies

Dodona, the Punches, are a genus of butterflies found in Asia. The genus was erected by William Chapman Hewitson in 1861.

== Description ==
Forewing broad, short, triangular; costa very slightly arched; apex subacute; termen slightly convex; tornus angulate; dorsum straight; cell comparatively broad, about half the length of the wing; veins 6 and 7 from upper apex of cell, therefore upper discocellular obsolete, middle and lower subequal, concave; vein 3 from a little before lower apex of cell, 4 from apex, 8 and 9 out of 7, 10 from upper apex of cell, 11 free, 12 very short, terminating opposite origin of 11. Hindwing: costa arched; apex broadly rounded; termen below apex straight to vein 4, then slightly bent inwards and slightly concave to tornus; tornus produced and lobed, in some forms with a slender tail in addition; dorsum slightly arched, nearly straight; cell about half the length of the wing; discocellulars oblique; vein 3 from just before lower apex of cell, 4 from apex; costa at base angular. Antenna over half the length of the forewing; club short, male reduced and clothed with soft hairs; tarsus one jointed; Female has the foreleg covered in scales and functional.

== Species ==
- Dodona egeon (Westwood, [1851]) Uttarakhand to Assam, Myanmar – orange Punch
- Dodona elvira Staudinger, 1896 northern Borneo
- Dodona adonira Hewitson, 1866 Nepal, Sikkim, north-eastern India (hills), northern Myanmar – striped Punch
- Dodona dipoea Hewitson, 1866 Tibet, Himalayas (west as far as Murree), north-eastern India (hills), Myanmar, western China – lesser Punch
- Dodona dracon de Nicéville, 1897 northern Myanmar
- Dodona kaolinkon Yoshino, 1999 western Yunnan
- Dodona katerina Monastyrskii & Devyatkin, 2000
- Dodona eugenes Bates, [1868] Tibet, Himalayas (west as far as Murree), north-eastern India (hills), Myanmar, western China – tailed Punch
- Dodona maculosa Leech, 1890 western and central China
- Dodona robinsoni Rothschild, 1920 Sumatra (Mount Kerinci)
- Dodona durga (Kollar, [1844]) Tibet, Chitral - Nepal, western and central China – common Punch
- Dodona ouida Hewitson, 1866 western China, Himalayas (west as far as Mussoorie), north-eastern India (hills), Myanmar
- Dodona vanleeuwenii Roepke, 1921 Java
- Dodona chrysapha Fruhstorfer, 1910 western Java (Mount Gede)
- Dodona deodata Hewitson, 1876 Assam - Myanmar
- Dodona henrici Holland, 1887 Hainan – white Punch
- Dodona aponata Semper, 1889 Philippines, Java, north-eastern Sumatra, northern Borneo
- Dodona speciosa Monastyrskii & Devyatkin, 2000
