= Daphne Aubertin =

British entomologist and malacologist (1902-1970)

- Born: 2 January 1902; Alresford, Hampshire, England
- Died: 14 November 1970 (aged 68); Wiltshire, England
- Other name: Daphne Dineley
- Education: Bedford College, London
- Occupations: malacologist entomologist curator

Daphne Aubertin, later Daphne Dineley F.L.S., F.E.S. (1902-1970), was a British malacologist and entomologist. Aubertin worked as an Assistant Keeper of Entomology at the Natural History Museum, London.

== Early life and family ==
Aubertin was born at Alresford, Hampshire on 2 January 1902. Aubertin's parents were Queen's Bays Lt.-Col. Peter Aubertin (1846-1923) and Sybil Hooper (1870-1932), who had married at Alresford in 1893. The Aubertin family were of Huguenot heritage. Daphne Aubertin had an older sister named Muriel (later Palmer, 1894-1983) and half-siblings Perrin and Mary, as Peter Aubertin had previously been married and widowed.

Daphne Aubertin married armaments dealer Mark Dineley on 5 March 1935 and they had four children.

== Education and career ==
Aubertin's early education was from a German governess who resided with her family. Later Aubertin attended Cheltenham Ladies' College, from where she successfully passed the entrance exam for the University of London in January-March 1921. From 1921-1925 Aubertin was a student at Bedford College, London, where she studied zoology under Philippa Esdaile (1888-1989), initially specialising in Malacology.

Aubertin was appointed as Assistant Keeper (Second Class) in the Department of Entomology at the Natural History Museum in July 1927.

In February 1928 Aubertin was elected a Fellow of the Malacological Society of London.

Circa 1931 Aubertin examined the Diptera material gathered during ecological fieldwork supervised by Thomas Alan Stephenson on the 1928 Great Barrier Reef Expedition.

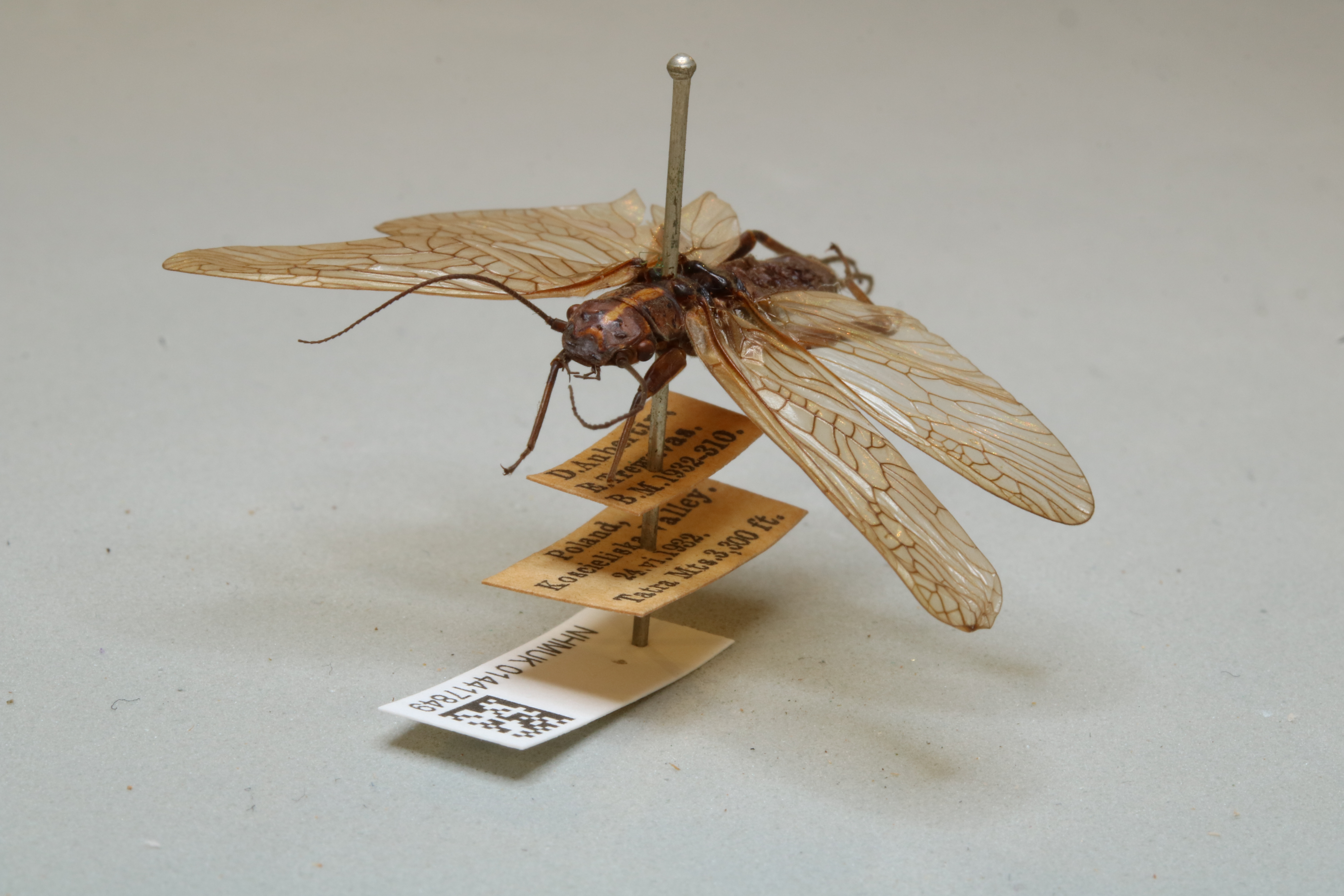
A Plecoptera specimen collected by Daphne Aubertin and Ethelwynn Trewavas at the Kościeliska Valley, Poland, on 24 June 1932 (NHMUK014417849).

In the summer of 1932 Aubertin and Ethelwynn Trewavas went on a six week expedition to the Carpathian Mountains, collecting 8,000 insects (mainly flies) in Poland and in former Czechoslovakia. Aubertin presented a lecture about the expedition, titled "Two Naturalists in the High Tatra," at the London Natural History Society in March 1933.

Aubertin resigned her position at the NHM in 1935 upon her marriage, and was succeeded as Assistant Keeper of Entomology by John Smart (1907-1986).

== Select publications ==
1927: On the Anatomy of the Land Snails (Helicidae) Cepaea hortensis Müller and Cepaea nemoralis L.: Proceedings of the Zoological Society of London: Volume 97, Issue 3, September 1927, pgs 553-582 [this paper formed the basis of Aubertin's MSc thesis].

1927: The Relationship of Shell Banding to Mantle Pigmentation in British Cepaea: Journal of Molluscan Studies: Volume 17, Issue 5-6, December 1927, pgs 198–205.

1933: Revision of the genus Lucilia R.-D. (Diptera, Calliphoridae): Zoological Journal of the Linnean Society: Volume 38, Issue 260, November 1933. pgs 389–436.

1937: Aubertin authored the chapter "Insects" in editor Charles Tate Regan's book Natural History, which was well-reviewed.

1940: Aubertin was a contributing author on Diptera Volume VI: The Calliphoridae, part of the book series The Fauna of British India. In the foreword, originator of the study and contributing author Roland A. Senior White explained that Aubertin had been obliged to pass her working notes back over to him upon her resignation from the Natural History Museum. The book was eventually brought to publication by John Smart who helped to prepare the manuscript and see it through the press. Because of Aubertin's resignation from the NHM, her planned section on Muscidae had to be omitted from the series.
