= The Fauna of British India, Including Ceylon and Burma =

Scientific books series

The Fauna of British India (short title) with long titles including The Fauna of British India, Including Ceylon and Burma, and The Fauna of British India Including the Remainder of the Oriental Region is a series of scientific books that was published by the British government in India and printed by Taylor and Francis of London. The series was started sometime in 1881 after a letter had been sent to the Secretary of State for India signed by Charles Darwin, Sir Joseph Dalton Hooker and other "eminent men of science" forwarded by P.L.Sclater to R.H. Hobart. W. T. Blanford was appointed editor and began work on the volume on mammals.

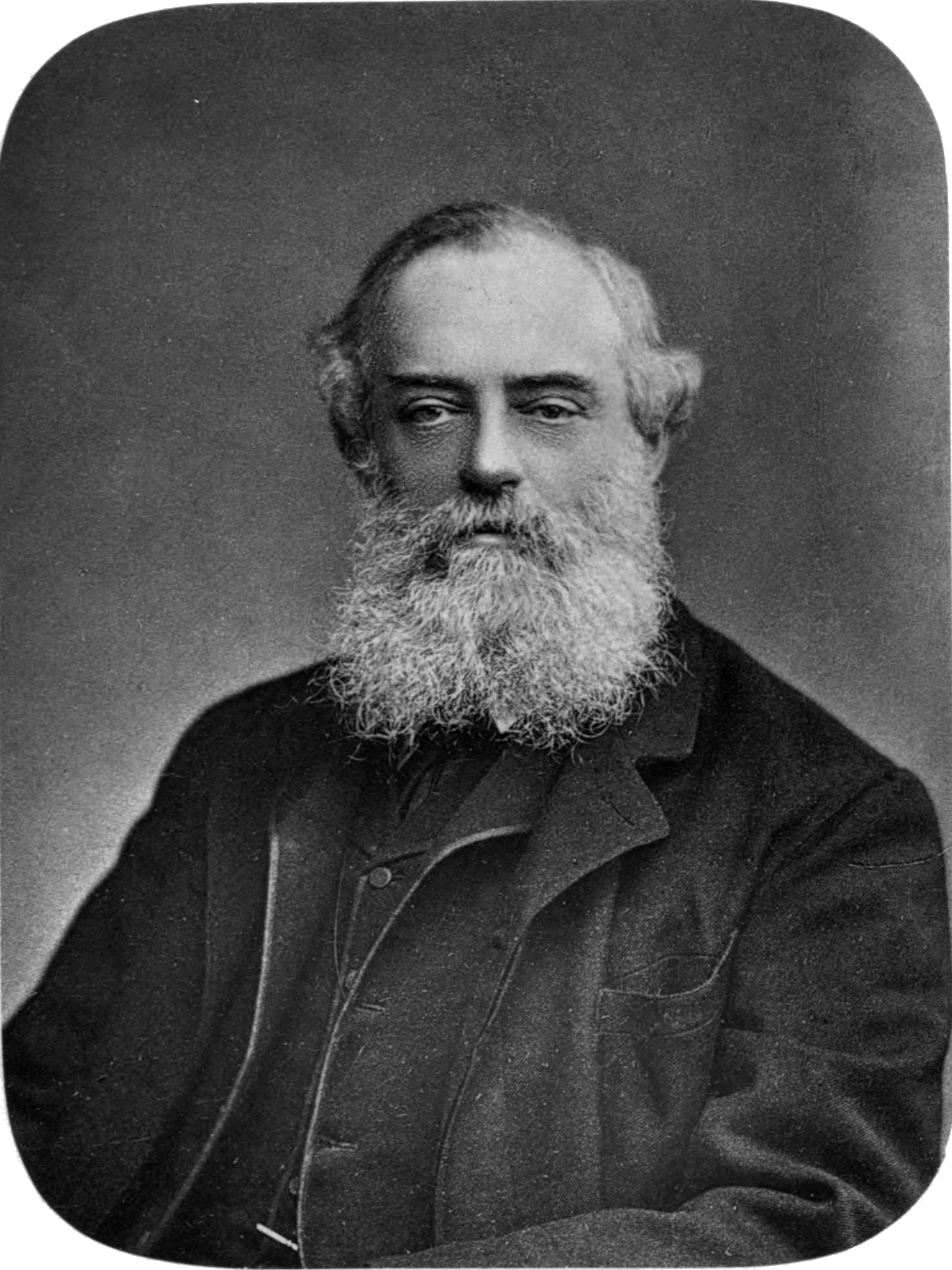
W. T. Blanford (1832–1905)

In the volume on the mammals, Blanford notes:

The need for new and revised descriptive works had, for some years before 1881, been felt and discussed amongst naturalists in India, but the attention of the Government was, I believe, first called to the matter by a memorial dated Sept. 15th of that year, prepared by Mr. P. L. Sclater, the well-known Secretary of the Zoological Society, signed by Mr. Charles Darwin, Sir J. Hooker, Professor Huxley, Sir J. Lubbock, Prof. W. H. Flower, and by Mr. Sclater himself, and presented to the Secretary of State for India. This memorial recommended the preparation of a series of Handbooks of Indian Zoology and my appointment as Editor. It is scarcely necessary to add that to the recommendation of men so highly respected and so well known in the world of Science the publication of the present Fauna of British India is greatly due, and that Mr. Sclater is entitled to the thanks of all interested in the Zoology of India for the important part he took in the transaction. I can only express a hope that the present series as a whole may be worthy of the distinguished support to which, in so great a degree, it owes its origin.

The idea was to cover initially the vertebrates, taking seven volumes, and this was followed by a proposal to cover the invertebrates in about 15 to 20 volumes and projected to cost £11,250 to £15,000. Blanford suggested that restricting it to 14 volumes would make it possible to limit the cost to £10,500. After Blanford's death, Arthur Everett Shipley became the editor. The first series was followed by a second edition of some of the volumes such as the mammals, birds, reptiles and butterflies. In 1922–23, Nelson Annandale sought to move the process of preparation of the books and its publication to India. The second edition is sometimes called the "new fauna". There were changes incorporated in this that included for instance the usage of trinomials for the birds. Following Shipley's death in 1927, Lieutenant Colonel John Stephenson, formerly of the Indian Medical Service was appointed editor in May 1928. Publication was stopped during the Second World War. After Indian Independence in 1947 a few volumes were published under the new name of Fauna of India but some of the volumes that were under preparation were never published. The 1953 volume on polychaetes by Pierre Fauvel was published by the Indian Press from Allahabad.

== Protozoa ==
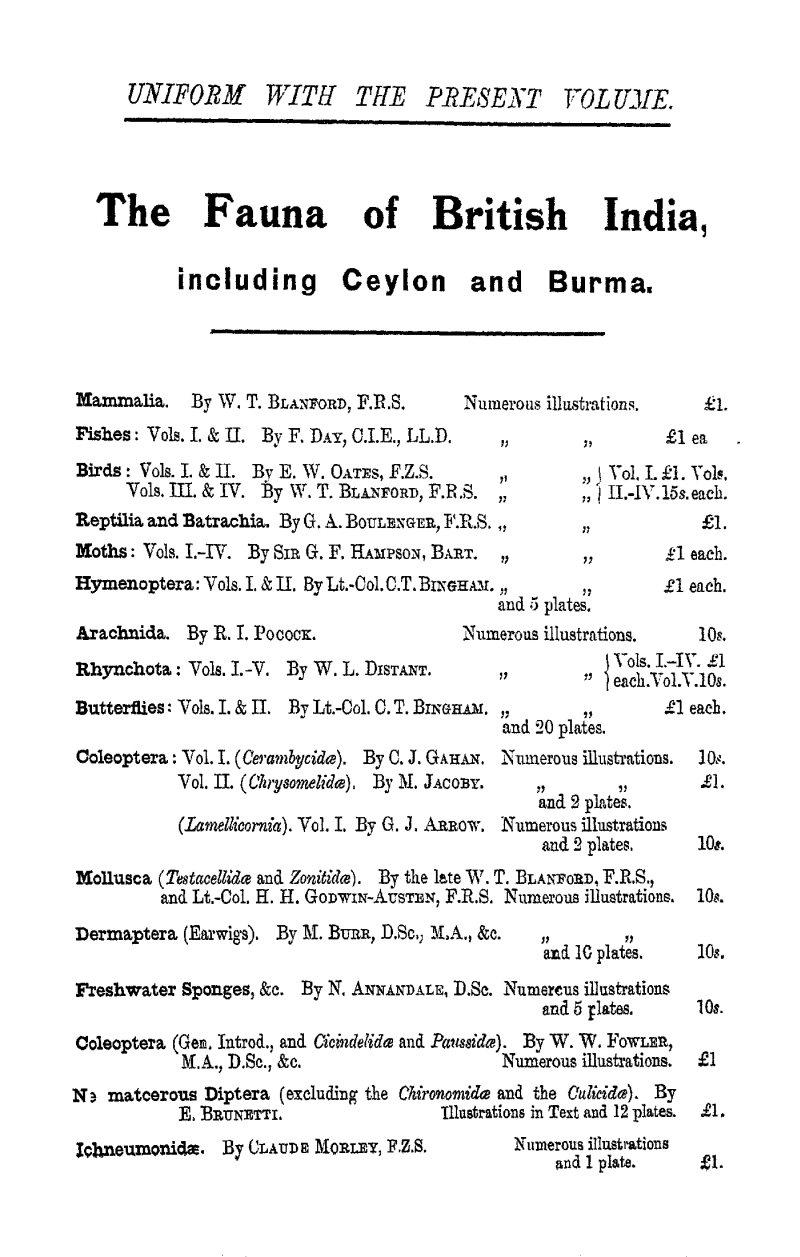
List of publications in the series in 1914. Average of £1 for each volume

- Bhatia, B. L. (1936) Vol. I Protozoa:Ciliophora
- Bhatia, B. L. (1938) Vol. II Protozoa: Sporozoa

== Coelenterata ==
- Annandale, Nelson (1911) Freshwater sponges, Hydroids & Polyzoa [251 p - 48 figs - 5 pl ]
- Burton M (?) Porifera (Not published)

== Nematoda, Cestoda, Oligochaeta, Annelida etc. ==
- Stephenson, J. (1923) Oligochaeta xxiv + 518 p - 261 figs
- Harding, W. A. & John Percy Moore (1927) Hirudinea xxxviii + 302 p - 63 figs - 8 pl (4 col.) - 1 map
- Southwell, T. (1930) Cestoda. Volume 1. Cestodaria, Bucestoda (excl. Taenioidia)
- Southwell, T. (1930) Cestoda. Volume 2. Taenioidia
- Baylis, H. A. (1936) Nematoda. 1. Ascaroidea and Strongyloidea [408 p - 182 figs ]
- Baylis, H. A. (1939) Nematoda. 2. Filarioidea, Dioctophymoidea and Trichinelloidea [274 p - 150 figs ]
- Fauvel, Pierre (1953) Polychaeta
- Bhalerao, DG (?) Trematoda (this was announced but never published)

== Crustacea ==
Although these volumes were sanctioned, they were never published.

- Nilsson-Cantell, CA (?) Cirripedia
- Chopra BN (?) Brachyura (Oxyrhyncha)
- Seymour Sewell, RB (?) Copepoda (Calanoids)

== Echinodermata ==
- Mortensen, Theodor Echinoidea (This was never produced due to the death of the author. See preface by R B Seymour Sewell in the 1953 Polychaeta volume.)

== Mollusca ==
- Blanford W. T. & Godwin-Austen H. H. 1908. Mollusca. Testacellidae and Zonitidae. Taylor & Francis, London. 311 pp.
- Gude G. K. 1914. Mollusca.−II. (Trochomorphidae--Janellidae). xii + 520 pp., 164 figs.
- Gude G. K. 1921. Mollusca.−III. Land operculates (Cyclophoridae, Truncatellidae, Assimineidae, Helicinidae). 386 pp.
- Preston H B 1915. Mollusca. Freshwater Gastropoda & Pelecypoda. Taylor & Francis, London, 244 pp., 29 figs.
- Prashad, Baini (?) Mollusca 5. Pelecypoda (not published)

== Arachnida ==
- Pocock, R.I. (1900) Arachnida (Split PDF)
- Sharif M (?) Ticks.

== Hemiptera ==
- Distant, W.L. (1902) Rhynchota 1. Heteroptera. Pentatomidae, Coreidae, Berytidae (See also Index to Rhynchota)
- Distant, W.L. (1904) Rhynchota 2. Heteroptera. Family 4 to 16. (Lygaeidae - Capsidae)
- Distant, W.L. (1906) Rhynchota 3. Heteroptera - Homoptera Heteroptera-family 17 to 24. (Anthoceridae - Coricidae) / Cicadidae, Fulgoridae.
- Distant, W.L. (1907–8) Rhynchota 4. Homoptera: Membracidae, Cercopidae, Jassidae & Heteroptera: Appendix (initially published in two parts)
- Distant, W.L. (1911) Rhynchota 5. Heteroptera: Appendix
- Distant, W.L. (1916) Rhynchota 6. Homoptera. Appendix
- Distant, W.L. (1918) Rhynchota 7. Homoptera:Appendix to Jassidae, Heteroptera:Addenda

== Dermaptera ==
- Burr, M. (1910) Dermaptera (Earwigs) [217 p - 10 pl]

== Odonata ==
- Fraser, F.C. (1933) Odonata. 1 Introduction, Coenagriidae 423 p
- Fraser, F.C. (1934) Odonata. 2 Agriidae, Gomphidae 398 p - 120 figs - 4 col. pl.
- Fraser, F.C. (1936) Odonata. 3 Cordulegasteridae, Aeshnidae, Libellulidae. 461 p.

== Orthoptera ==
- Kirby, WF (1914) Acridiidae

Second edition

- Uvarov, BP (?) Acridiidae
- Chopard L. (1969) The Fauna of India and the Adjacent Countries. Orthoptera. Vol.2: Grylloidea. Calcutta: Baptist Mission Press.
- Henry G M (?) Tettigoniidae

== Blattaria ==
- Shelford, R. Blattidae (sanctioned but not published)

== Coleoptera ==
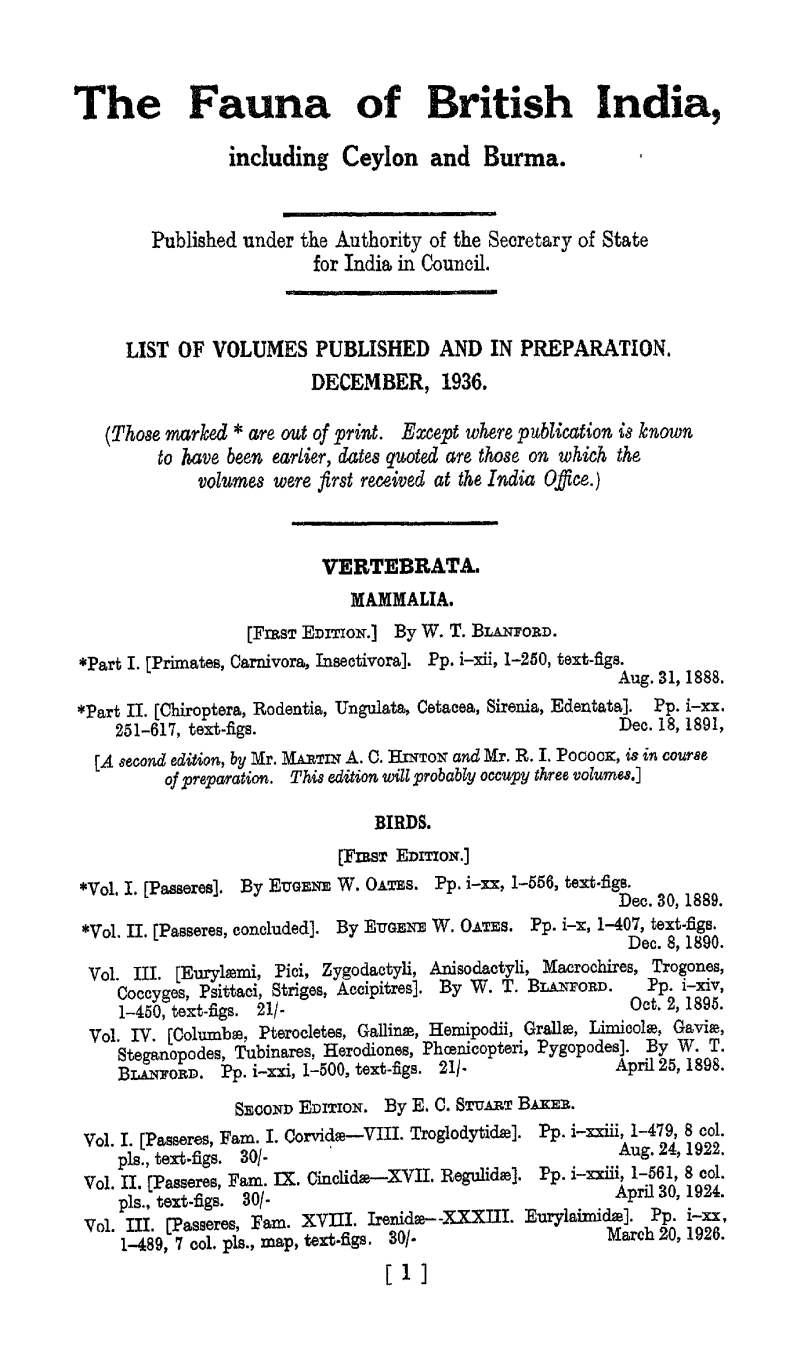
List of publications from 1936. Prices listed in Rupees

- Andrewes, H. (1929) Carabidae 1. Carabinae [ 431 p - 62 figs - 9 pl (1 col) ]
- Andrewes, H. (1935) Carabidae 2. Harpalinae [ 323 p - 51 figs - 5 pl ]
- Arrow, G.J. (1910) Lamellicornia 1. Cetoniinae and Dynastinae [xiv + 322 p - 76 figs - 2 col. pl. ]
- Arrow, G.J. (1917) Lamellicornia 2. Rutelinae, Desmonycinae, Euchirinae [xiii + 387 p - 77 figs - 5 pl (1 col.)]
- Arrow, G.J. (1931) Lamellicornia 3. Coprinae [428 p - 61 figs - 13 pl (1 col.) - 1 map ]
- Arrow, G.J. (1949) Lamellicornia 4. Lucanidae & Passalidae[vii + 274 pp., 23 pl]
- Arrow, G.J. (1925) Clavicornia : Erotylidae, Languriidae & Endomychidae [xv + 416 p - 76 figs - 1 col. pl. - 1 map]
- Beeson, C.F.C. (?) Platypodidae ()
- Browne, J Balfour (never published) Dytiscidae, Gyrinidae and Haliplidae
- Cameron, M. (1930) Staphylinidae 1. (Micropeplinae, Oxytelinae, Oxyporinae, Megalopinae, Steninae, Enaesthetinae) [471 p - 134 figs - 1 map - 3 col. plates]
- Cameron, M. (1934) Staphylinidae. 2. (Paederinae) 257 p - 2 col. pl.
- Cameron, M. (1932) Staphylinidae 3. (Staphylininae, Trichophyinae, Termitodiscinae, Pygosteninae, Tachyporinae) 443 p - 4 col. pl.
- Cameron, M. (1939) Staphylinidae 4. Part 1. Subfam. Pseudopernthinae and Aleocharinae (part)
- Cameron, M. (1939) Staphylindae 4. Part 2. Aleocharinae.
- Fowler, W. (1912) Coleoptera. General introduction and Cicindelidae to Paussidae xx + 529 p - 240 figs
- Gahan, C. (1906) Coleoptera. Cerambycidae 329 p -107 figs
- Jacoby, Martin & others (1908–1936) Chrysomelidae Volumes 1–4. (Jacoby died before the first volume was published. See preface to the first volume by C T Bingham)
  - Jacoby, M. (1908) Chrysomelidae 1. Eupodes, Camptosomes, Cyclica 534 p - 172 figs - 2 pl
  - Maulik, S. (1919) Chrysomelidae Volume 2 Hispinae and Cassidinae xi + 439 p - 130 figs
  - Maulik, S. (1926) Chrysomelidae Volume 3. Chrysomelinae and Halticinae 442 p - 139 figs - 1 map
  - Maulik, S.(1936) Chrysomelidae Volume 4. Galerucinae 648 p - 144 fig - 1 map - 1 pl - hbk
- Marshall, Guy A.K. (1916) Rhynchophora, Curculionidae 367 p - 108 figs

Sanctioned but not published

- Beeson CFC Scolytidae
- Beeson CFC Platypodidae
- Stebbing, E.P. Buprestidae

== Diptera ==
- Brunetti, E. (1912) Diptera : Nematocera excluding Chironomidae & Culicidae 581 p
- Brunetti, E. (1920) Diptera 2. Brachycera Volume 1 (Stratiomyiidae, Leptidae, Nemestinidae, Cyrtidae, Bombyliidae, Therevidae, Scenopinidae, Mydaidae, Empidae, Lonchopteridae, Platypezidae) 401 p.
- Brunetti, E. (1923) Diptera 3. Pipunculidae, Syrphidae, Conopidae, Oestridae [424 p - 83 fig - 5 pl]
- Christophers, S.R. (1933) Diptera Volume 4. Culicidae tribe Anophelini
- Barraud, P.J. (1934) Diptera Volume 5. (Culicidae) tribes Megarhinini & Culicini
- R Senior-White, Daphne Aubertin & John Smart (1940) Diptera Volume 6. Calliphoridae
- Hobby, BM (?) Diptera Volume 7. Asilidae
- Oldroyd, H (?) Tabanidae
- van Emden, F I - Muscidae Diptera Volume 7. Part 1 Published 1966 in The Fauna of India - Part 2 was planned but never published.

== Aphaniptera ==
- Sharif, M (?) Fleas.

== Hymenoptera ==
- Bingham, C.T. (1897) Hymenoptera. Vol. 1. Wasps and bees xxix + 579 pp.
- Bingham, C. T. (1903) Hymenoptera, Vol. 2. Ants and Cuckoo-wasps 506 pp.
- Morley, C. (1913) Hymenoptera Vol. 3. Ichneumones Deltoidei 531 p - 152 fig - 1 pl

== Lepidoptera ==
- Bingham, C. T. (1905) Butterflies Vol. 1 - Family Nymphalidae
- Bingham, C. T. (1907) Butterflies Vol. 2 - Families Papilionidae, Pieridae and Lycaenidae
- George Francis Hampson & others (1892–1937) Moths. 5 volumes
  - Hampson, G. (1892) Moths 1. Saturniidae to Hypsidae 527 p - 333 fig
  - Hampson, G. (1894) Moths 2. Arctiidae, Agrostidae, Noctuidae 609 p - 325 figs
  - Hampson, G. (1895) Moths 3. Noctuidae (cont.) to Geometridae 546 p - 226 figs
  - Hampson, G. (1896) Moths 4. Pyralidae 594 p - 287 figs
  - Bell TRD & F B Scott (1937) Moths. Vol. 5. Sphingidae [537 p - 1 folding map - 15 pl]

Second edition

- Talbot, G. (1939) Butterflies. Vol. 1 Papilionidae, Pieridae, xxix + 600 p - 184 figs - 1 folding map - 3 col. pl.
- Talbot, G. (1947) Butterflies. Vol. 2 Danaidae, Satyridae, Amathusiidae and Acraeidae. xv + 506 p - 104 figs - 2 col. pl.

== Reptilia and Amphibia ==
- Günther, A.C.L.G. (1864) Reptiles of British India . xxvii + 452 p - 26 pl (Not part of the Fauna of British India series, but included here for completeness)
- Boulenger, G. A. (1890) Reptilia and Batrachia xviii + 541 p - 142 figs

Second edition

- Smith, M. A. (1931–1943) Reptilia and Amphibia. 3 Volumes. (Volume 4 was to cover Amphibia).
  - Smith, M. A. (1931) Reptilia and Amphibia 1: Loricata and Testudines xviii + 185 p - 42 figs - 2 pl
  - Smith, M. A. (1935) Reptilia and Amphibia 2: Sauria xiii + 440 p - 93 figs - 1 pl - 2 maps
  - Smith, M. A. (1943) Reptilia and Amphibia 3: Serpentes xii + 583 p - 166 figs

== Fishes ==
- Day, Francis (July 11, 1889) Fishes Volume I Chondropterygii, Teleoste (Physostomi; Acanthopterygii: Percidae)
- Day, Francis (September 21, 1889) Fishes Volume II Teleostei (Acanthopterygii excl. Percidae; Anacanthini; Lophobranchii; Plectognathi), Leptocardii

Second edition

- Hora, SL (?) (projected to be published in 5 volumes in 1953 but not published)

== Birds ==
- Oates, E. W. (Blanford, W. T., editor) (1889) Birds. 1 [582 p]
- Oates, E. W. (1890) Birds. 2 [424 p]
- Blanford, W. T. (1895) Birds. 3 [450 p - 102 figs]
- Blanford, W. T. (1898) Birds. 4 [500 p - 127 figs]

Second edition

- Baker, Stuart (1922) Birds. 1 524 p
- Baker, Stuart (1924) Birds. 2 606 p - 86 figs
- Baker, Stuart (1926) Birds. 3 534 p
- Baker, Stuart (1927) Birds. 4 471 p - 71 figs
- Baker, Stuart (1928) Birds. 5 469 p - 49 figs
- Baker, Stuart (1929) Birds. 6 548 p
- Baker, Stuart (1930) Birds. 7 484 p (Synonymical catalogue Passeres-Grallae)
- Baker, Stuart (1930) Birds. 8. 326 p (Synonymical catalogue Grallae - Pygopodes; Corrigenda and Addenda)

== Mammals ==
- Blanford, WT (1888, 1891) Mammalia
  - Part 1 Primates, Carnivora, Insectivora
  - Part 2 Chiroptera, Rodentia, Ungulata, Cetacea, Sirenia, Edentata

Second edition

- Pocock, R.I. (1939) Mammalia. I. Primates and Carnivora
- Pocock, R.I. (1941) Mammalia. II. Carnivora :Aeluroidea, Arctoidea
- Ellerman, J.R, Roonwal, M.L. (ed.) (1961) Mammalia. III. Rodentia
