= Charles Thomas Bingham =

Irish military officer and entomologist (1848–1908)

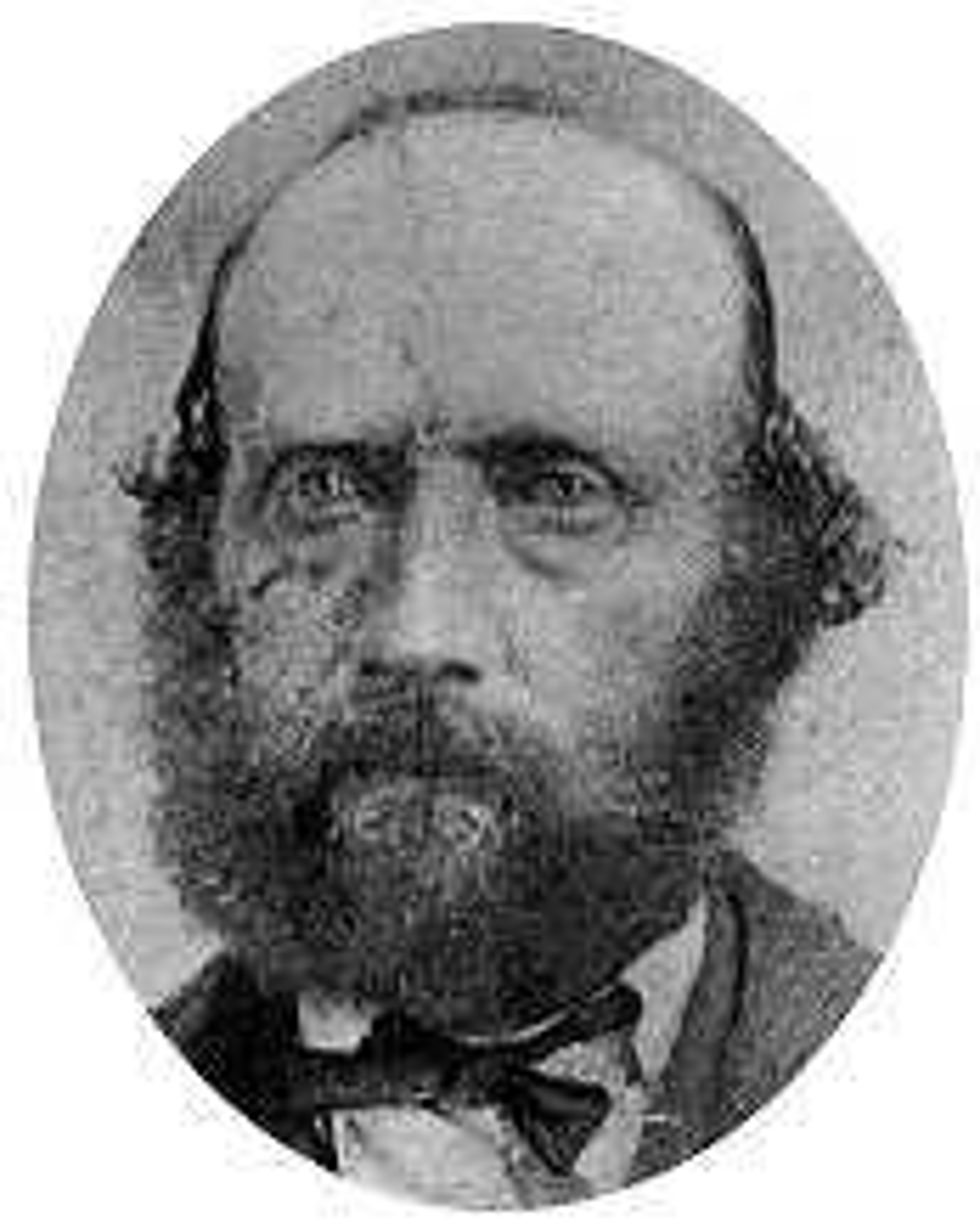
- Born: 16 April 1848; India
- Died: 18 October 1908 (aged 60); West Kensington, Greater London, England

Charles Thomas Bingham (16 April 1848 – 18 October 1908) was an Irish military officer and entomologist.

Bingham was born in India of an old Irish family, and he was educated in Ireland. His military career began in India where he was a soldier in the Bombay Staff Corps and later with the Bengal Staff Corps. At first interested in ornithology he took up entomology from 1877 following a posting to Burma where he was also conservator of forests.

On his retirement in 1894 he settled with his wife and two sons (his three daughters married in India) in London. Here he worked, unpaid, in the Insect Room of the Natural History Museum, organising and cataloguing the world collection of aculeate Hymenoptera. He took over from William Thomas Blanford the editorship of two of the Hymenoptera volumes of The Fauna of British India, Including Ceylon and Burma series and two of the butterfly volumes.

He was elected a fellow of the Entomological Society of London in 1895 and was a member of its council from 1903 to 1906. In the same year he became a fellow of the Zoological Society of London.

== Works ==
He collaborated with other naturalists across India to produce his works on the Indian Lepidoptera and Hymenoptera.

- The Fauna of British India, Including Ceylon and Burma. Hymenoptera. Volume 1. Wasps and Bees. London: Taylor and Francis (1897).
- The Fauna of British India, Including Ceylon and Burma. Hymenoptera, Volume 2. Ants and Cuckoo-wasps. London: Taylor and Francis (1903).
- The Fauna of British India, Including Ceylon and Burma. Butterflies Volume 1. London: Taylor and Francis (1905).
- The Fauna of British India, Including Ceylon and Burma. Butterflies Volume 2. London: Taylor and Francis (1907)

From Sikkim my friend Mr. Fritz Möller has sent me large collections in the most perfect condition. Many of the forms in these were procured at high altitudes, and are most interesting and rare. To Col. E. R. Johnson, late of the Indian Medical Service, I owe the gift of a small but very valuable collection from Simla and from Shillong in Assam. To Col. Swinhoe I am indebted, not only for the gift of many specimens, but for the privilege of examining at leisure the fine series of Indo-Malayan forms contained in his collection. Mr. Gilbert Rogers, of the Imperial Forest Service of India, in the most lavish way, employed native collectors in the Andaman and Nicobar Islands, and has generously placed the material collected at my disposal. Messrs. Allan and Craddock, of the Burma Forest Department, have sent me small but very useful collections from Pegu and the Southern Shan States; and to Mr. E. E. Green and to the Hon. F. Mackwood I owe many specimens from Ceylon. Major E. Stokes-Roberts, R.E., sent me several collections made in the Anaimalai and Nilgiri Hills in Southern India. These were particularly valuable to me for comparison with the northern Indian forms.

He also extensively improved on the earlier published information from Frederic Moore and Lionel de Nicéville. The following is from his preface to the butterflies volume of The Fauna of British India, Including Ceylon and Burma:

I am greatly indebted to the information contained in Mr. Moore's great work, the Lepidoptera Indica as will be seen from the frequent quotations from and references to the volumes so far completed. Of the three volumes issued of the Butterflies of India (Vol. I by Col. G. F. L. Marshall and L. de Niceville; vols. II and III by L. de Niceville.), the first two are completely out of date and, I believe, out of print. Col. Marshall and Mr. de Niceville were pioneers in the systematic investigation of the Indian Lepidopterous Fauna; and the impulse given to the study of Indian butterflies by the publication, by the two authors conjointly, of the first volume of the Butterflies of India, Burma and Ceylon, and, by the late Mr. de Niceville alone, of volumes II and III cannot be rated too highly. De Niceville's enthusiasm communicated itself to others, and his ever ready and generous help encouraged many who, like myself, feel that his early death has been almost an irreparable loss to Indian Entomology. Had my late friend lived, the compilation of the present work would never have been attempted by me; it would have been in his far abler hands. As it is, it will be good news to many that the Trustees of the Indian Museum acquired the MSS. of the volumes on the Papilionidae, Pieridae and Hesperiidae left partially incompleted at Mr. de Niceville's death. These MSS. have been generously placed at my disposal for use in the compilation of the future volumes of this work. In connection with this, I ought to add that the unique collection of Indo-Malayan Lepidoptera brought together by the late Mr. de Niceville was acquired some little time before his death by the Indian Museum, and that through the kindness of Major Alcock, I.M.S., O.I.E., F.R.S., Superintendent Indian Museum, I have had the privilege of examining many of the types.

== Named for Bingham ==
In Dutch, the white-headed bulbul is named for Bingham as Binghams buulbuul. Several species of ants and wasps are named after him including Tetraponera binghami, Aenictus binghami and Vespa binghami.

== Collections ==
His Hymenoptera are in the Natural History Museum, London, with duplicates in the Natural History Museum, Berlin. The Lepidoptera were scattered and presumably sold. His Parnassius, the snow Apollo butterflies, are in Ulster Museum, Belfast.

== Sources ==
- Anonymous 1909: "Bingham, C.T." Entomologist's Monthly Magazine (3) 45
- Dodd, F.P. (1906). "Notes upon some remarkable parasitic insects from North Queensland; with an appendix containing descriptions of new species, by Colonel Charles T. Bingham, F.Z.S, and Dr Beno Wandolleck". Trans. Ent. Soc. London. 1906: 119–124.
- Maxwell-Lefroy, Harold (1909). "Obituary Lieut.-Colonel C.T. Bingham". Journal of the Bombay Natural History Society. 19: 214–215.
