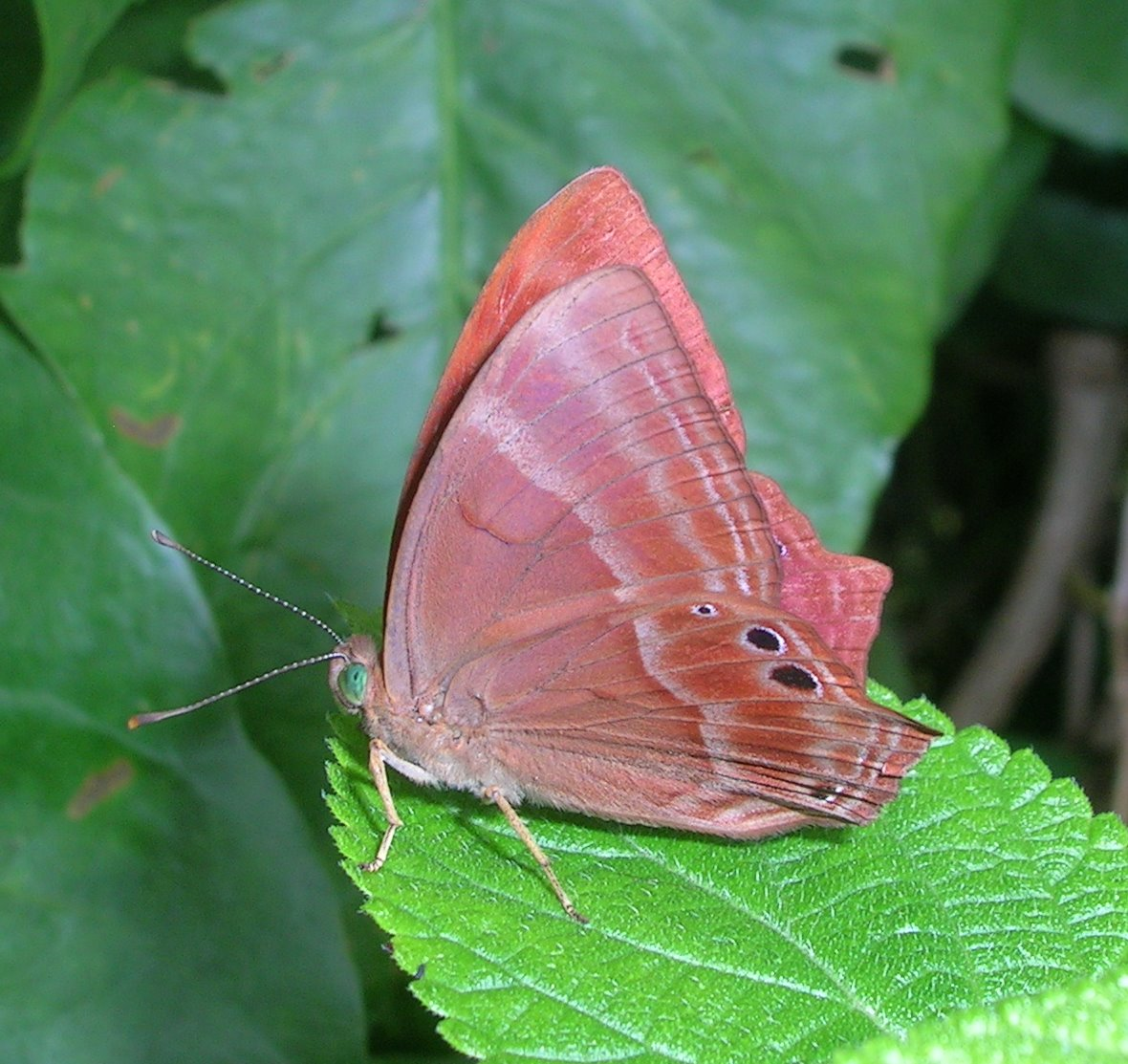

Scientific classification
- Kingdom: Animalia
- Phylum: Arthropoda
- Class: Insecta
- Order: Lepidoptera
- Family: Riodinidae
- Genus: Abisara
- Species: A. echerius

Binomial name
- Abisara echerius (Stoll, [1790])

Synonyms
- Papilio echerius Stoll, [1790]; Sospita lydda Hewitson, 1866; Abisara echerius; Abisara echeria; Abisara prunosa Moore, 1879

= Abisara echerius =

Plum Judy

Species of butterfly

Abisara echerius, the plum Judy, is a small but striking butterfly found in Asia belonging to the Punches and Judies family (Riodinidae). It is difficult to distinguish it from Abisara bifasciata.

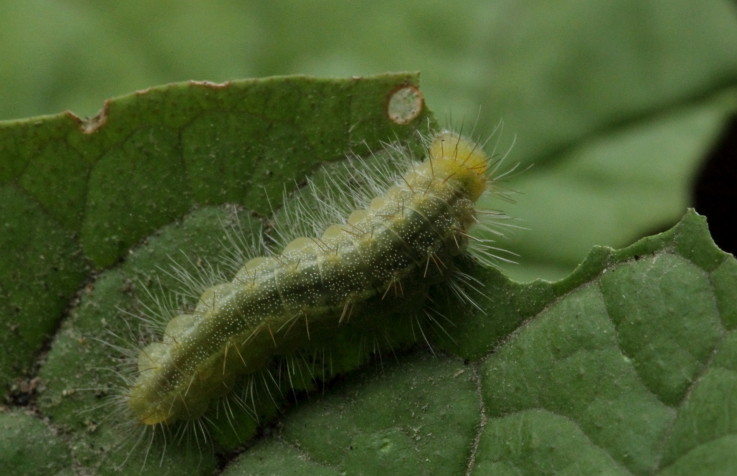
Larva

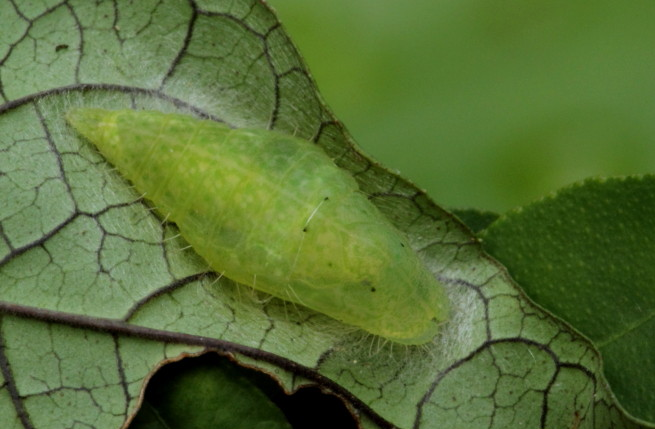
Pupa

This active butterfly is usually seen at the tops of trees and amidst foliage. It has a habit of landing and turning around almost immediately after alighting. It repeats this turning movements as it moves along branches. This is believed to help in evading predators by causing confusion about head orientation. This distinctive mode of movement gives the impression of dancing and is an important field characteristic that helps in identifying the species from even a distance.

== Description ==
Charles Thomas Bingham in his The Fauna of British India, Including Ceylon and Burma volume on butterflies describes the species as follows:

A very variable form. Termen of hindwing more or less broadly angulate or produced at apex of interspace 3, but not narrow or tailed as in Abisara neophron.

=== Wet-season form ===
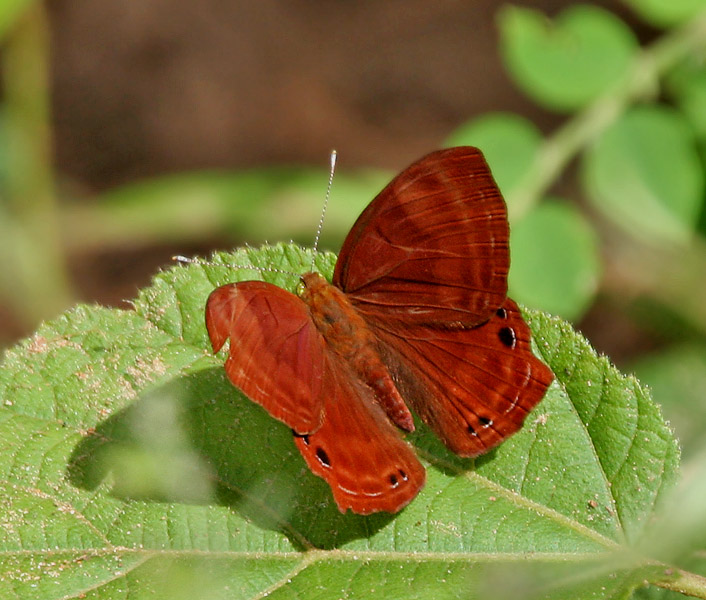
Wet-season form, female in Talakona forest, in Chittoor District of Andhra Pradesh, India

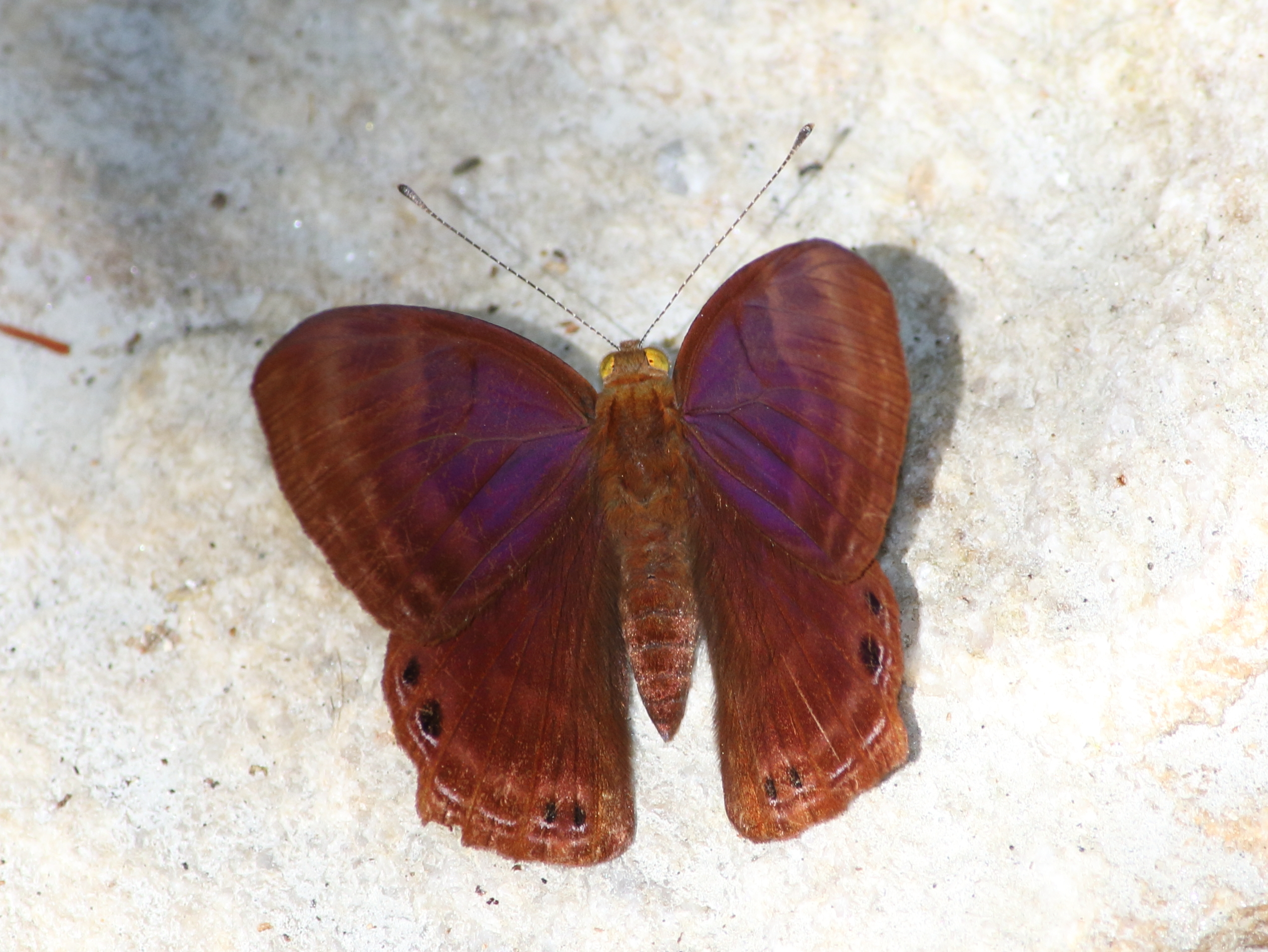
Male in Buxa Tiger Reserve, West Bengal, India

Male: Upperside rich purple-brown or maroon-brown with a blue gloss. Forewing with discal and postdiscal transverse fasciae very obscure and only slightly paler than the ground colour. Hindwing uniform; two inwardly conical small black spots near apex of interspace 1, and single similar but larger black spots near apices of interspaces 5 and 6; all these spots bordered slenderly and somewhat obscurely on the outer side with white. Underside dull maroon brown. Forewing with a broad, slightly curved discal, narrower postdiscal and subterminal transverse pale bands; the discal fascia broadening anteriorly. Hindwing: a slightly curved narrow discal pale fascia; the black spots as on the upperside, but bordered on the inner and on the outer sides by an obscure pale lunular line. Antennae black with scattered pale specks; head, thorax and abdomen maroon-brown; beneath, the palpi, thorax and abdomen paler brown.

Female: Upperside: hazel brown, the terminal halves of the wings paler. Forewing: discal and postdiscal broad, obscure, pale transverse fasciae, followed by similarly obscure, somewhat broken, inner and outer subterminal pale transverse lines. Hindwing with a transverse series of obscure postdiscal pale lunular spots; the black white-margined spots as in the male but smaller, the anterior two superposed, on the pale spots; terminal margin below vein 4 with inner and outer, and above vein 4 with single subterminal transversely linear markings. Underside: ground colour similar but paler on the basal, very much paler on the terminal halves of the wings; the markings as on the upperside, but the fasciae on the forewings and hindwings broader, more diffuse; the black subterminal spots in interspaces 1, 5 and 6 of the hindwing smaller. Antennae, head, thorax and abdomen as in the male but paler.

=== Dry-season form ===
Male: Upperside the maroon brown not glossed with purple; the transverse fasciae on the forewing and the black markings on the hindwing much as in the wet-season form, but the former more obscure, more diffuse, the latter smaller. Underside as in the wet-season form but paler.

Female: Upper and under sides similar to those of the wet-season, form but conspicuously paler, the contrast between the dark basal and pale terminal halves in fore prominent, the discal band on the underside of the forewing very broad, diffuse and pale, often nearly white. Antenna, head, thorax and abdomen in both sexes as in the wet-season form but paler.

Wingspan: 41–52 mm.

== Races ==
Variety angulata Moore, and variety abnormis Moore, have been described from Burma and Tenasserim. Typically, these differ slightly from A. echerius as follows: Upperside with no purple gloss; the discal and postdiscal transverse bands more clearly defined, the former sometimes white anteriorly on the upperside, generally white or whitish on the underside and extending across both forewings and hindwings; underside of hindwing with an extra, subterminal black spot. The white markings and the extra black spot are variable characters, and specimens intermediate between typical A. echerius and typical angulata or abnormis are not uncommon.

Race bifasciata (Moore) is found in the Andaman Islands. Male upperside is not as dark as in the wet-season form of echerius. The transverse pale bands on both wings are broad and diffuse.

== Distribution ==
This species lives in the Himalayas, Chumba to Kumaon, Nepal and Bhutan; Ambala; Fyzabad; Malda; Calcutta; Gunjam; southern India from below Pune and Mumbai; Sri Lanka; Myanmar (Tenasserim); China.

== Life history ==
The eggs of the butterfly are laid on host plants belonging to the family Primulaceae, including Ardisia species, Maesa indica and Embelia laeta.

=== Larva ===
Flat, very broad in the middle, tapering to both ends, clothed sparsely with short hairs; head small, not enclosed in the 2nd segment; colour light green. (Davidson & Aitken)

=== Pupa ===
Also clothed with hairs, and altogether so like the larva that it is difficult to note exactly when the change takes place. It is closely attached to a leaf by the tail and a girdle. (Davidson & Aitken)

== See also ==
- Abisara bifasciata
- Riodinidae
- List of butterflies of India
- List of butterflies of India (Riodinidae)
- List of butterflies of the Western Ghats
