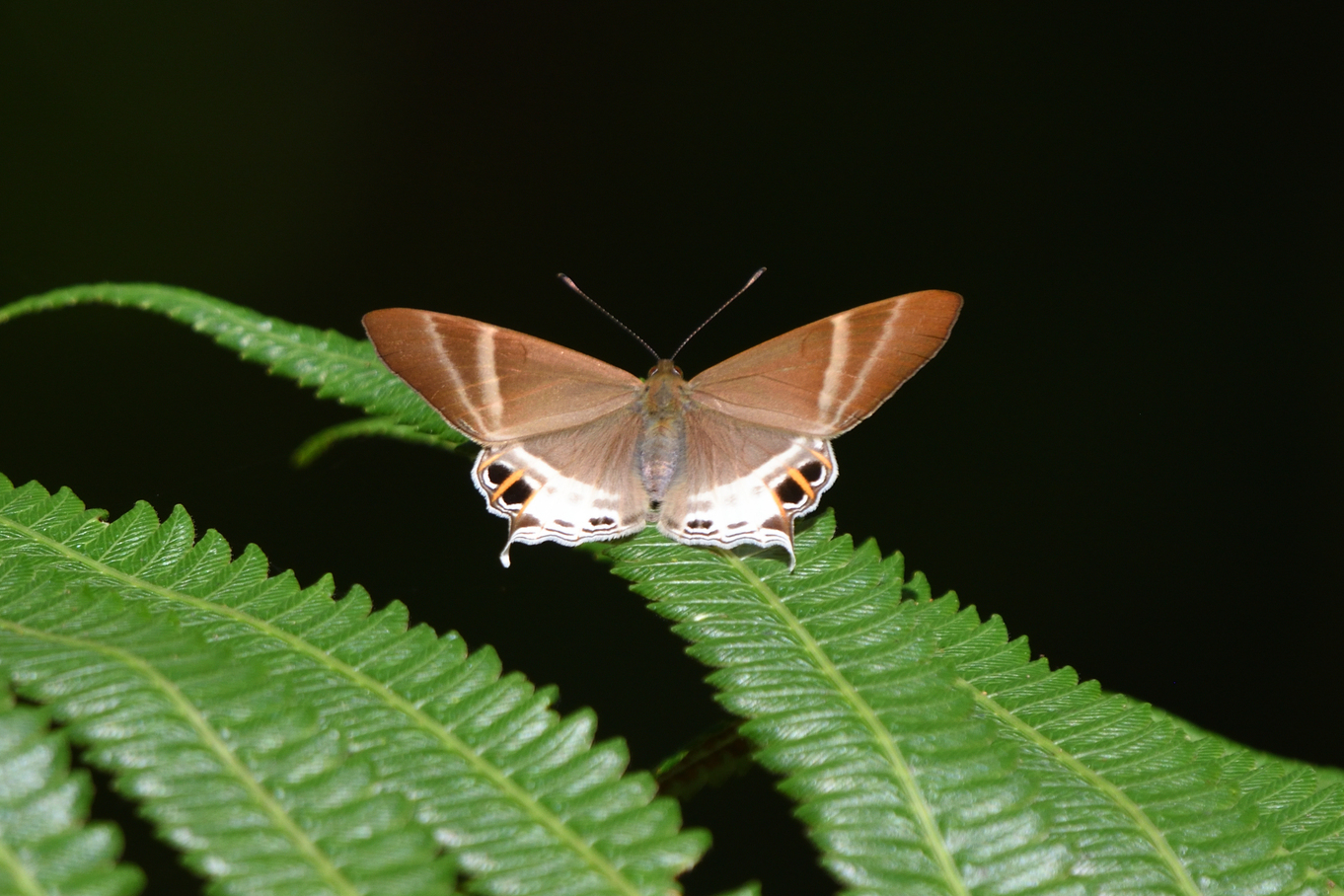

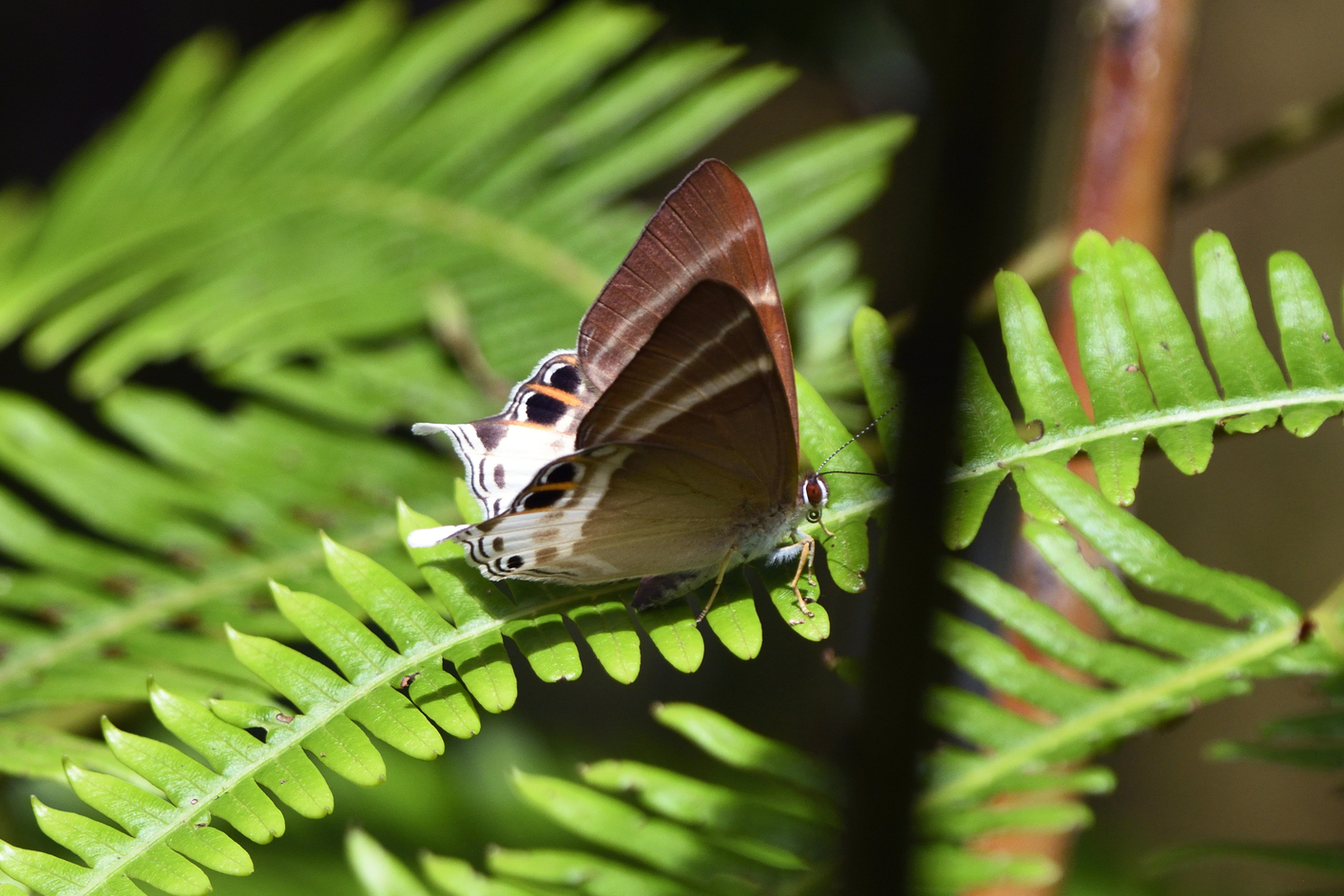

Scientific classification
- Kingdom: Animalia
- Phylum: Arthropoda
- Clade: Pancrustacea
- Class: Insecta
- Order: Lepidoptera
- Family: Riodinidae
- Genus: Archigenes
- Species: A. aita

Binomial name
- Archigenes aita (de Nicéville, 1893)

= Archigenes aita =

Species of butterfly

Archigenes aita is a butterfly in the family Riodinidae. It is found on both Sumatra and Borneo. It was first described by British entomologist Lionel de Nicéville in 1893. A phylogenetic analysis led to its being moved out of the genus Abisara.
