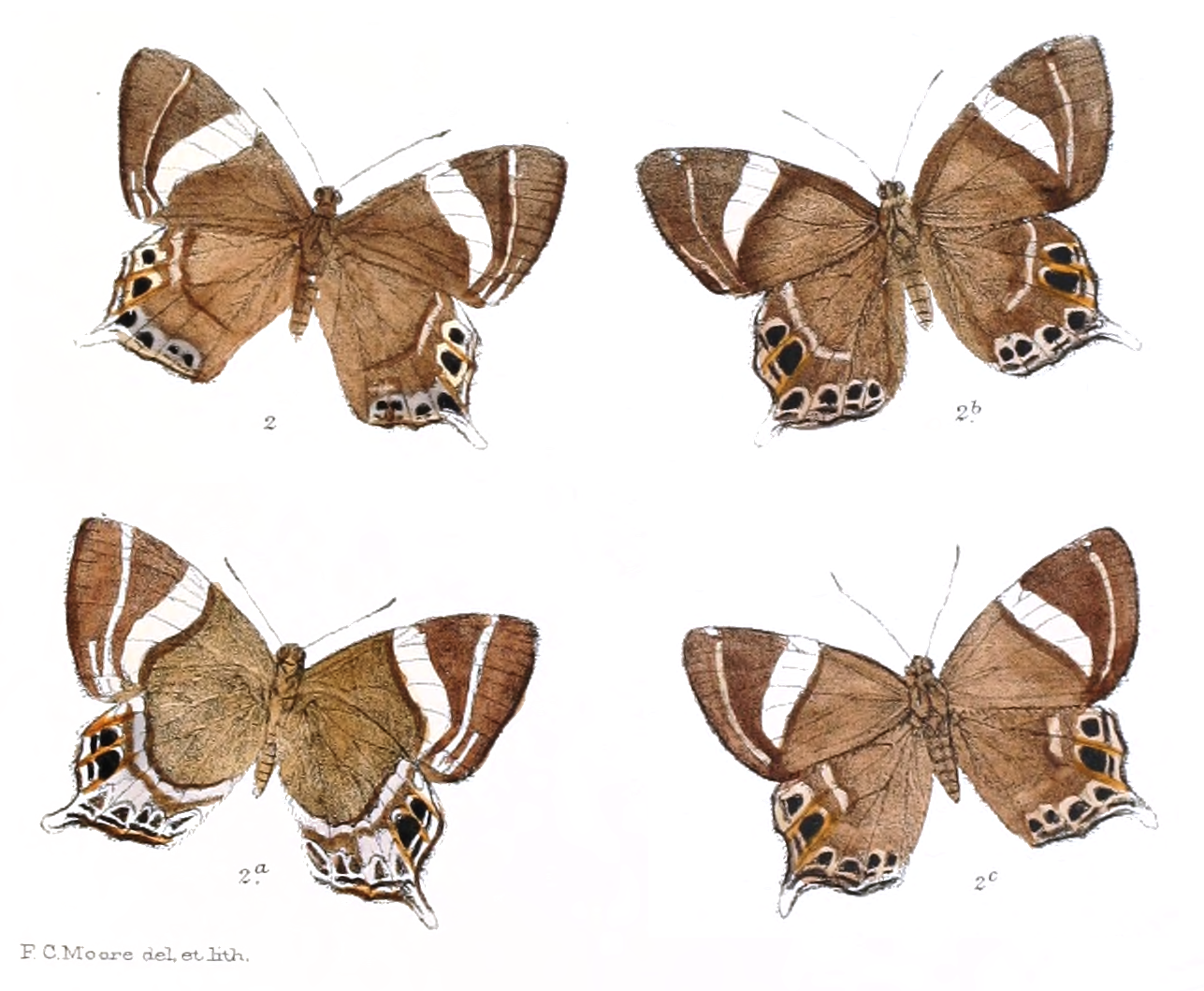

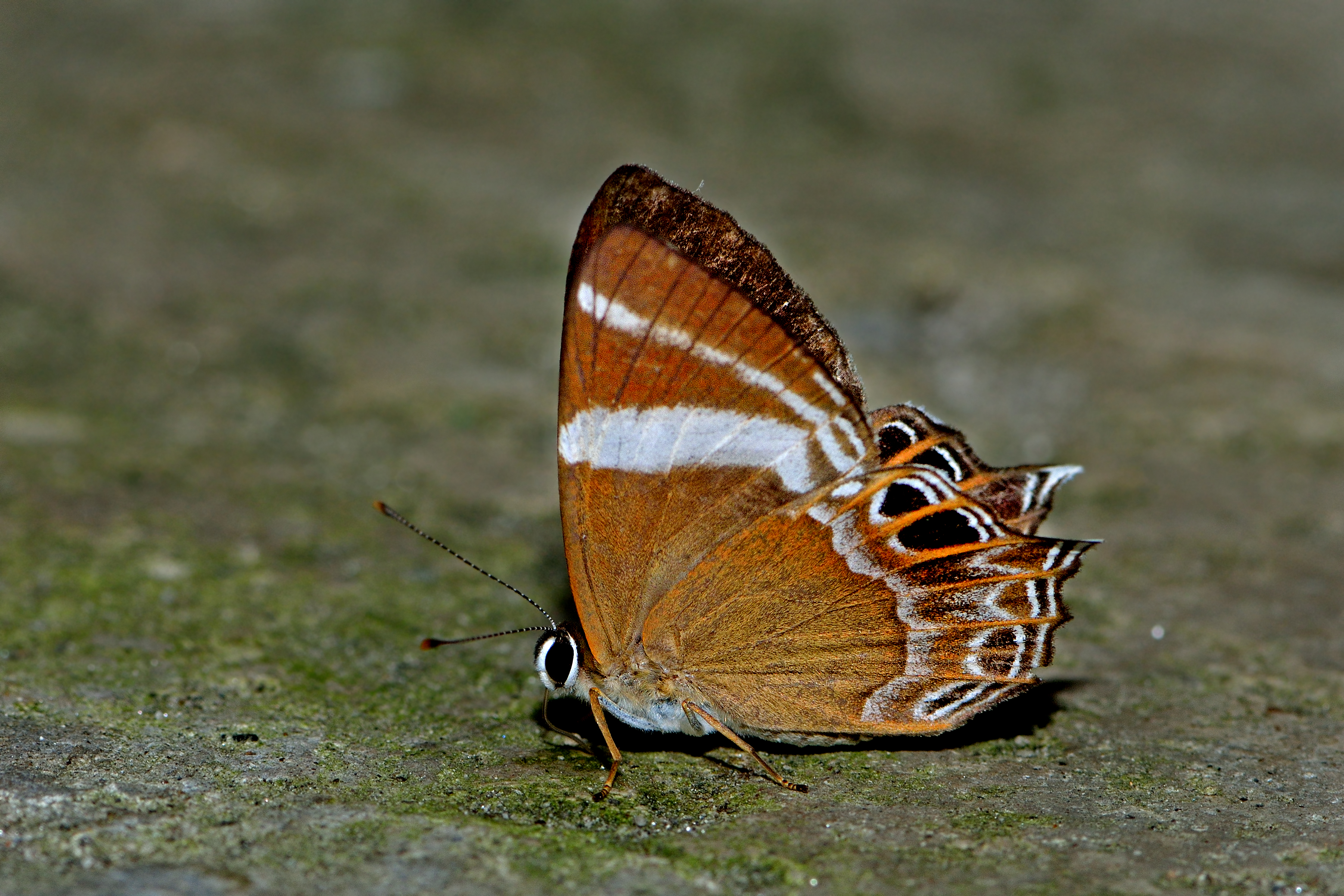

Scientific classification
- Kingdom: Animalia
- Phylum: Arthropoda
- Class: Insecta
- Order: Lepidoptera
- Family: Riodinidae
- Genus: Archigenes
- Species: A. chela

Binomial name
- Archigenes chela (Guerin, 1843)

= Archigenes chela =

Spot Judy

Species of butterfly

Archigenes chela, the spot Judy, is a small but striking butterfly found in India that belongs to the family Riodinidae. A 2015 study separated them from the genus Abisara to Archigenes.

== Description ==
Closely resembles Abisara neophron but is smaller in both sexes and differs as follows: Upperside of forewings has discal white band comparatively broader and shorter, not extending to vein 1, of more even width, not so conspicuously narrowed posteriorly; postdiscal white band more clearly defined and ending anteriorly in a prominent subcostal white spot. Hindwing differs in the subterminal broken white lines being bordered inwardly in interspaces 1 to 3 by much darker brown spots than in A. neophron; the conspicuous oval black spots near apices of interspaces of 5 and 6 much as in A. neophron, but the outer of the two subterminal short lines beyond them ochraceous, not white; tail at apex of vein 4 as in A. neophron, but proportionately shorter. Underside as in A. neophron, but the postdiscal band on the forewing comparatively broader and more clearly defined; the postdiscal area broadly lilac coloured.

== See also ==
- Riodinidae
- List of butterflies of India
- List of butterflies of India (Riodinidae)
