= Afriodinia intermedia =

Scientific classification
- Kingdom: Animalia
- Phylum: Arthropoda
- Class: Insecta
- Order: Lepidoptera
- Family: Riodinidae
- Genus: Afriodinia
- Species: A. intermedia

Binomial name
- Afriodinia intermedia (Aurivillius, 1895)

Species of butterfly

Afriodinia intermedia, the plain Judy, is a butterfly in the family Riodinidae. It is found in Ghana, southern Nigeria, Cameroon, Angola and the Democratic Republic of the Congo. The habitat consists of dense forests. It was formerly placed in the genus Abisara.
