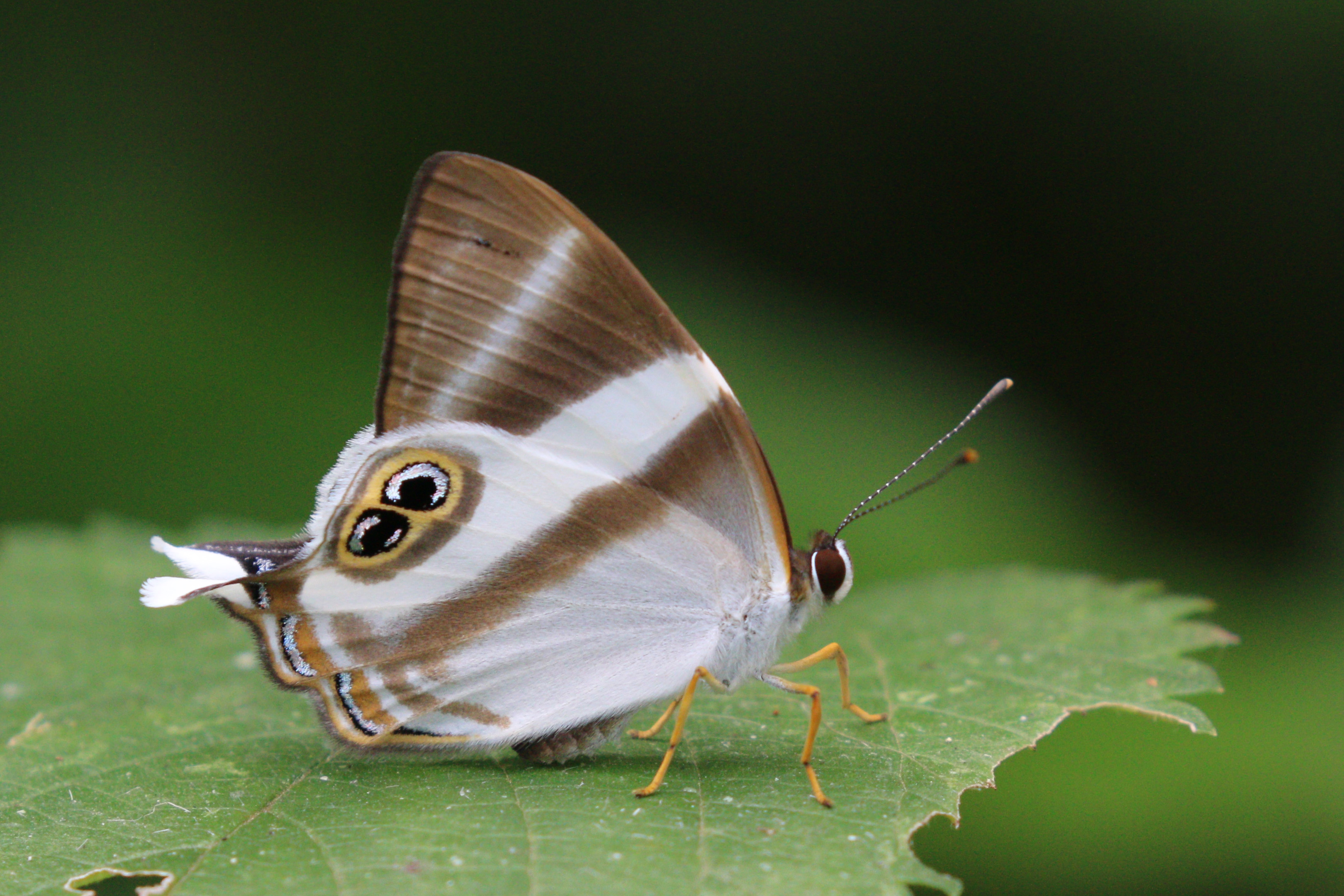
- A. n. neavei Kibale Forest, Uganda

Scientific classification
- Kingdom: Animalia
- Phylum: Arthropoda
- Class: Insecta
- Order: Lepidoptera
- Family: Riodinidae
- Genus: Afriodinia
- Species: A. neavei

Binomial name
- Afriodinia neavei (Riley, 1932)

Synonyms
- Abisara rogersi dollmani Riley, 1932

= Afriodinia neavei =

Species of butterfly

Afriodinia neavei, commonly known as the Neave's Judy or Neave's banded Judy, is a butterfly in the family Riodinidae. It is found in Nigeria, Cameroon, the Democratic Republic of the Congo, Uganda, Rwanda, Burundi, Kenya, Tanzania and Zambia. Its habitat includes primary and gallery forests, as well as the fringes of submontane forests.

The larvae feed on Maesa lanceolata.

== Subspecies ==
- A. n. congdoni Kielland, 1985 (Tanzania)
- A. n. dollmani Riley, 1932 (Democratic Republic of the Congo: south to Lualaba and Shaba, northern Zambia)
- A. n. kivuensis Riley, 1932 (Democratic Republic of the Congo: north-east to Uele, Ituri and Kivu)
- A. n. latifasciata Riley, 1932 (Nigeria, north-western Cameroon)
- A. n. mahale Kielland, 1978 (western Tanzania: Mahale Mountains, especially the western slopes of Mount Kungwe)
- A. n. neavei (Uganda, Rwanda, Burundi, western Kenya, north-western Tanzania, Democratic Republic of the Congo (Kasai, Lomami, Lualaba, Tanganika and Maniema)
