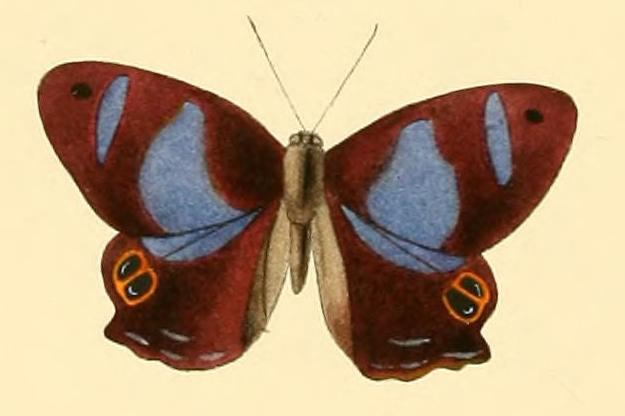

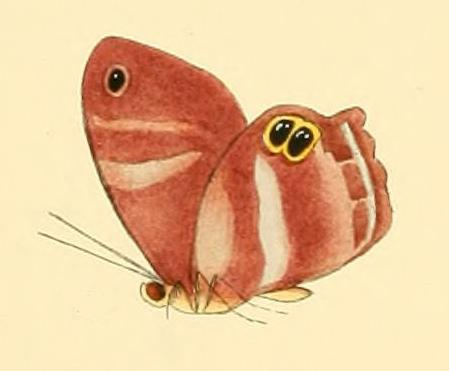

Scientific classification
- Kingdom: Animalia
- Phylum: Arthropoda
- Class: Insecta
- Order: Lepidoptera
- Family: Riodinidae
- Genus: Afriodinia
- Species: A. tantalus

Binomial name
- Afriodinia tantalus (Hewitson, 1861)

Synonyms
- Sospita tantalus Hewitson, 1861; Abisara tantalus f. uniformis Riley, 1932; Abisara caerulea liberiana Clench, 1965; Abisara tantalus male form caerulea Riley, 1932; Abisara caerulea Carpenter & Jackson, 1950; Abisara tantalus f. metallicus Berger, 1981

= Afriodinia tantalus =

Species of butterfly

Afriodinia tantalus, the blue-spot Judy, is a butterfly in the family Riodinidae. It is found in Guinea, Liberia, Ivory Coast, Ghana, Nigeria, Cameroon, the Republic of the Congo, Angola and the Democratic Republic of the Congo. The habitat consists of humid and dense forests.

== Subspecies ==
- Afriodinia tantalus tantalus (Guinea, Liberia, Ivory Coast, Ghana)
- Afriodinia tantalus caerulea Carpenter & Jackson, 1950 (Nigeria: south and Cross River loop, Cameroon, Congo, Angola, Democratic Republic of the Congo)
- Afriodinia tantalus cyanis Callaghan, 2003 (eastern Democratic Republic of the Congo)
