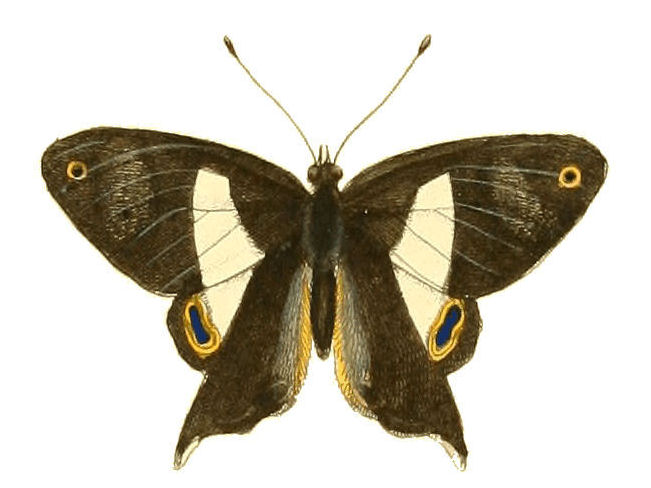
- Illustration by Dru Drury
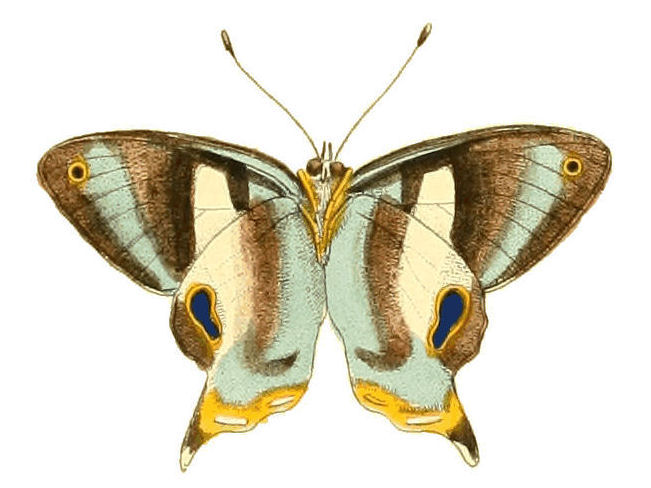
- Ventral view

Scientific classification
- Kingdom: Animalia
- Phylum: Arthropoda
- Class: Insecta
- Order: Lepidoptera
- Family: Riodinidae
- Genus: Afriodinia
- Species: A. gerontes

Binomial name
- Afriodinia gerontes (Fabricius, 1781)

Synonyms
- Papilio gerontes Fabricius, 1781; Papilio baucis Drury, 1782

= Afriodinia gerontes =

Dark banded Judy

Species of butterfly

Afriodinia gerontes, the dark banded Judy, is a butterfly belonging to the Riodinidae family. It is found in Sierra Leone, Liberia, Ivory Coast, Ghana, Nigeria, Cameroon, Gabon, the Republic of the Congo and the Democratic Republic of the Congo. The habitat consists of tropical humid forests and lowland forests in hilly terrain.

== Subspecies ==
- Afriodinia gerontes gerontes (Sierra Leone, Liberia, Ivory Coast, Ghana, Nigeria: south and the Cross River loop, western Cameroon)
- Afriodinia gerontes gabunica Riley, 1932 (southern Cameroon, Gabon, Congo, Democratic Republic of the Congo)
