= Spitosa sobrina =

Scientific classification
- Kingdom: Animalia
- Phylum: Arthropoda
- Class: Insecta
- Order: Lepidoptera
- Family: Riodinidae
- Genus: Spitosa
- Species: S. sobrina

Binomial name
- Spitosa sobrina (Mell, 1923)

Species of butterfly

Spitosa sobrina is a butterfly in the family Riodinidae. It is located in southern China, primarily western Yunnan.
