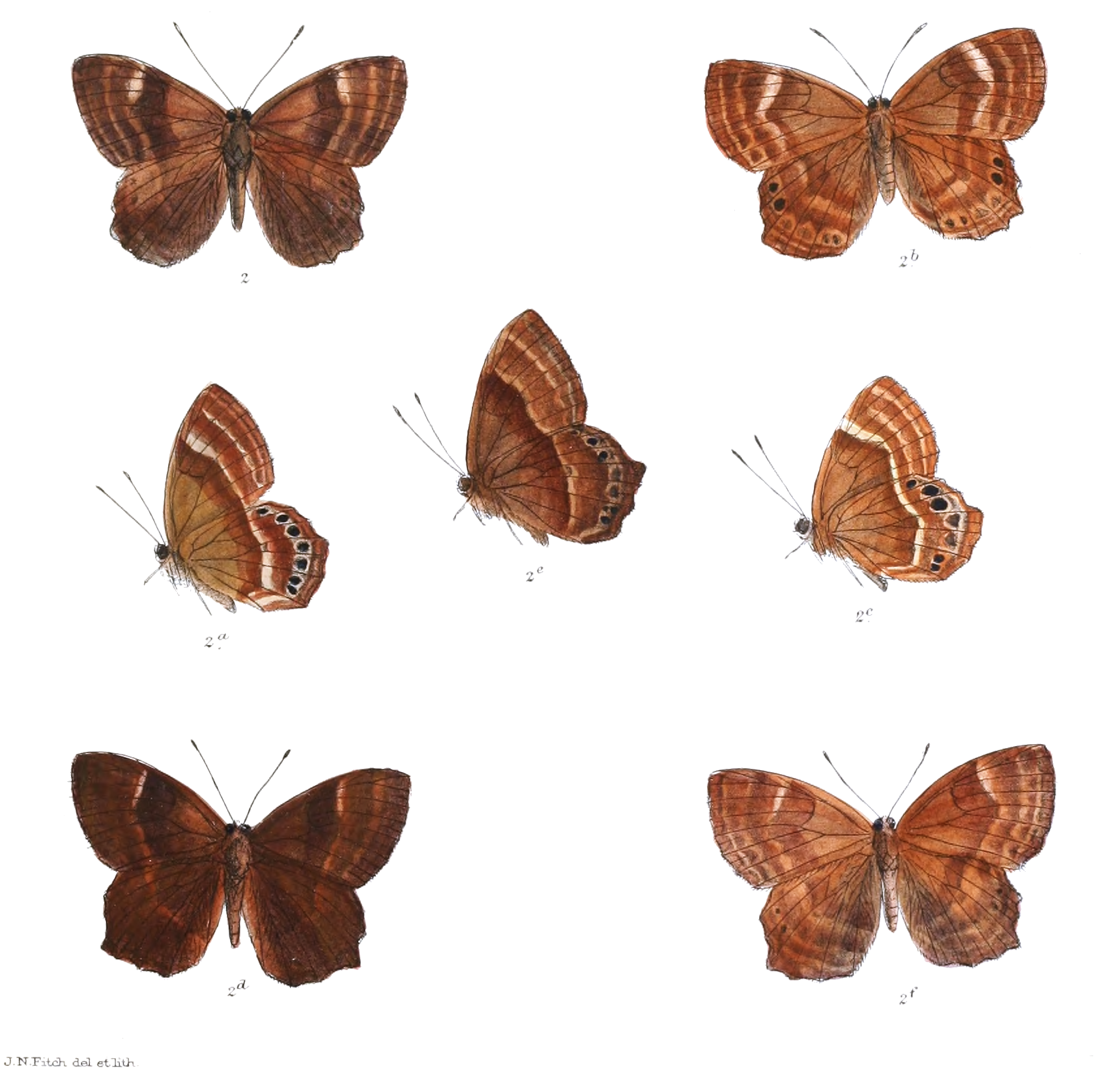

Scientific classification
- Domain: Eukaryota
- Kingdom: Animalia
- Phylum: Arthropoda
- Class: Insecta
- Order: Lepidoptera
- Family: Riodinidae
- Genus: Abisara
- Species: A. abnormis

Binomial name
- Abisara abnormis Moore, [1884]

= Abisara abnormis =

Species of butterfly

Abisara abnormis or Abnormal Judy is a butterfly in the family Riodinidae. It is found in Burma and Assam.
