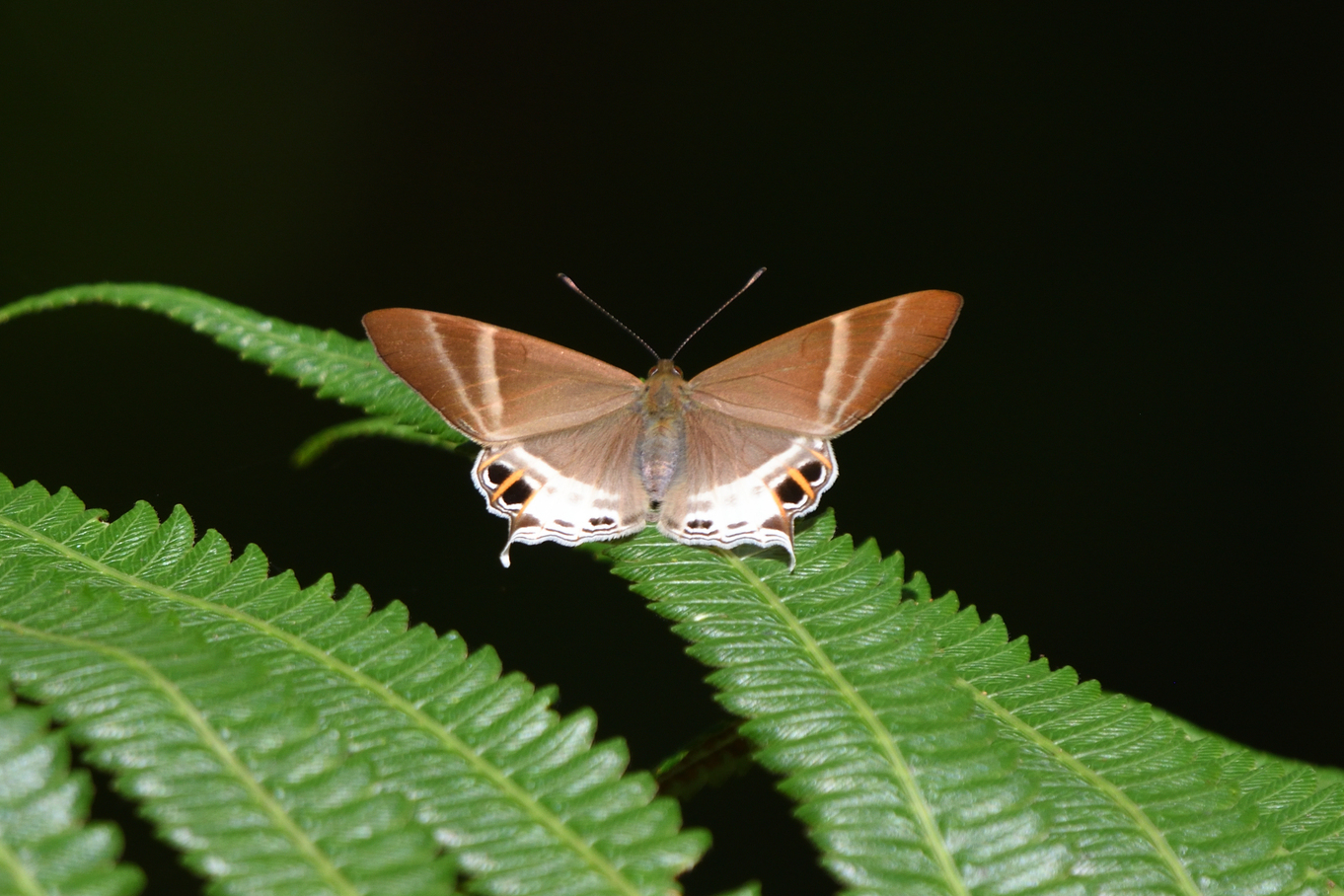
- Archigenes aita

Scientific classification
- Kingdom: Animalia
- Phylum: Arthropoda
- Class: Insecta
- Order: Lepidoptera
- Family: Riodinidae
- Genus: Archigenes; Fruhstorfer, 1914

Type species
- Abisara aita de Nicéville, 1893

= Archigenes (butterfly) =

Genus of butterflies

Archigenes is a genus of metalmark butterflies found in Asia. Species in the genus were formerly placed in the genu Abisara but a phylogenetic study found the genus to be polyphyletic requiring the separation of some under the genus Archigenes that form a distinct clade within the Nemeobiinae.

Species placed within this genus include:

- Archigenes aita (De Niceville, 1893)
- Archigenes atlas (de Nicéville, 1895)
- Archigenes attenuata (Tytler, 1915)
- Archigenes chela (Guérin, 1843)
- Archigenes miyazakii (K. Saito & T. Saito, 2005)
- Archigenes neophron (Guérin, 1843)
- Archigenes savitri (Guérin, 1843)
