= Afriodinia caeca =

Scientific classification
- Kingdom: Animalia
- Phylum: Arthropoda
- Class: Insecta
- Order: Lepidoptera
- Family: Riodinidae
- Genus: Afriodinia
- Species: A. caeca

Binomial name
- Afriodinia caeca (Rebel, 1914)

Synonyms
- Abisara talantus caeca Rebel, 1914; Abisara barnsi Joicey and Talbot, 1921; Abisara talantus semicaeca Riley, 1932

Species of butterfly

Afriodinia caeca is a butterfly and belongs to the genus Afriodinia in the family Riodinidae. It is found in Cameroon, Gabon, the Republic of the Congo, Angola, the Democratic Republic of the Congo, Uganda and Tanzania. Its habitat consists of swamp forests.

== Subspecies ==
- Afriodinia caeca caeca (Democratic Republic of the Congo: Uele, Ituri and Kivu, south-western Uganda, north-western Tanzania)
- Afriodinia caeca semicaeca Riley, 1932 (Cameroon, Gabon, Congo, western Democratic Republic of the Congo, possibly Angola)
