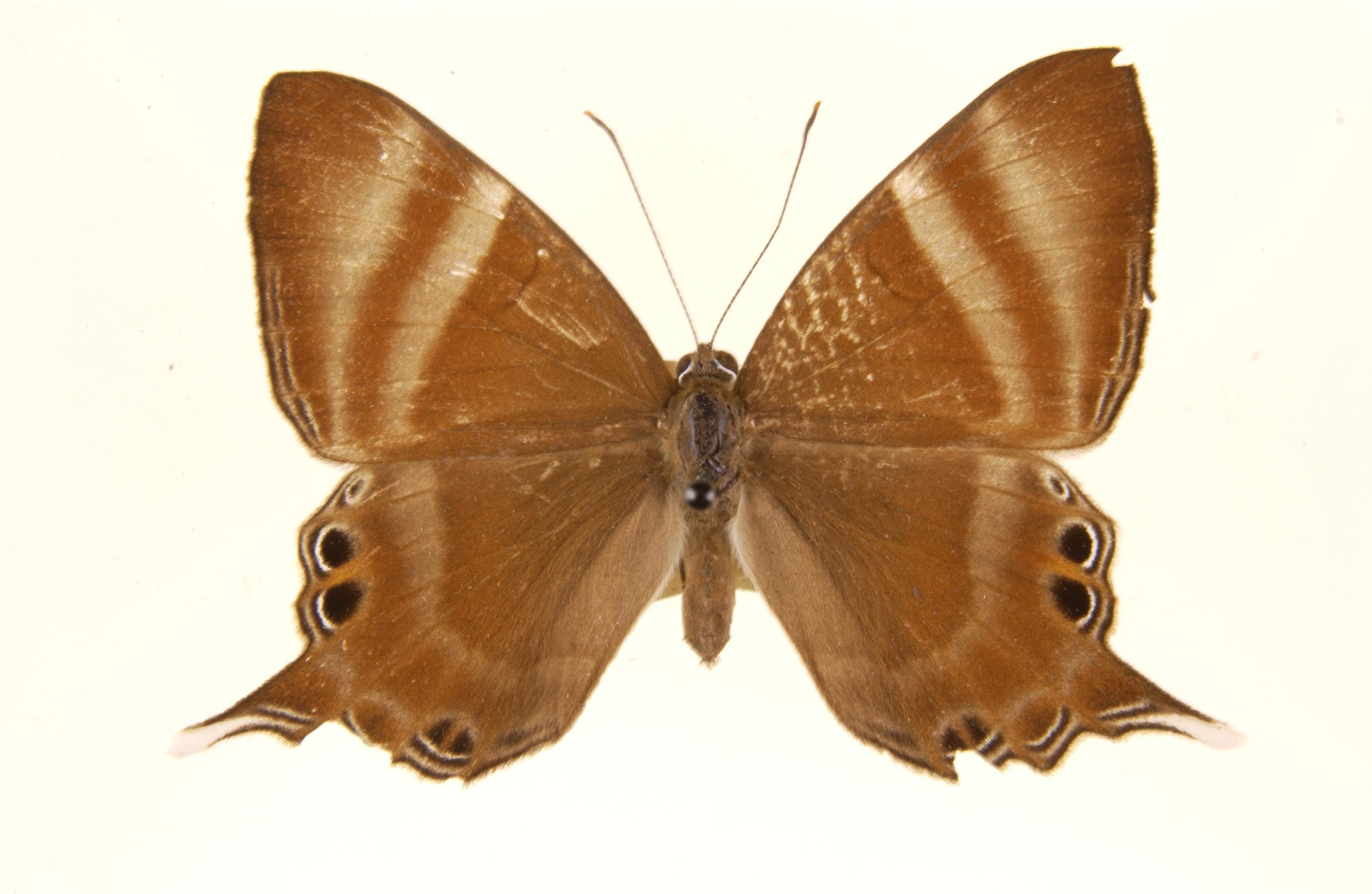

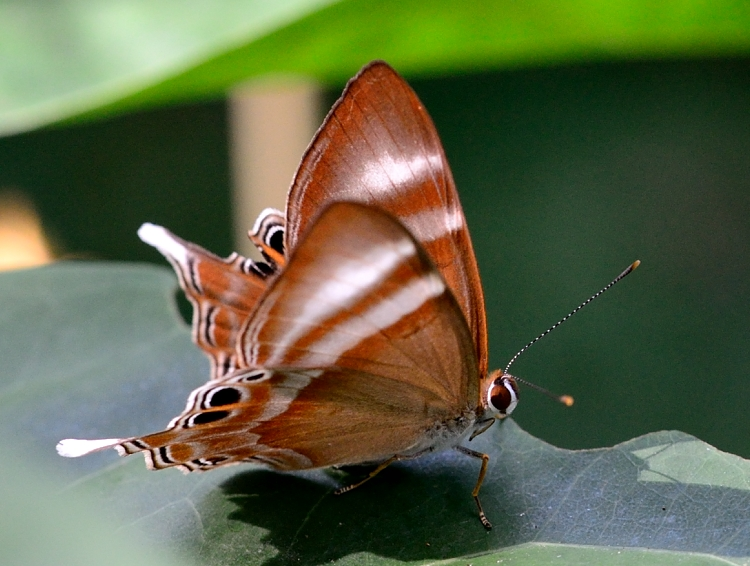

Scientific classification
- Kingdom: Animalia
- Phylum: Arthropoda
- Class: Insecta
- Order: Lepidoptera
- Family: Riodinidae
- Genus: Archigenes
- Species: A. savitri

Binomial name
- Archigenes savitri (Guerin, 1843)

Synonyms
- Sospita susa Hewitson, 1861; Abisara atlas de Nicéville, 1895; Sospita savitri sciurus Fruhstorfer, 1904; Sospita savitri strix Fruhstorfer, 1904

= Archigenes savitri =

Malay tailed Judy

Species of butterfly

Archigenes savitri, the Malay tailed Judy, is a small butterfly found in Asia that belongs to the Punches and Judies, that is, the family Riodinidae. A 2015 study separated them from the genus Abisara to Archigenes.

== Subspecies ==
- A. s. savitri
- A. s. deniya Fruhstorfer, 1914 (Bangka)
- A. s. periya Fruhstorfer, 1914 (Natuna)
- A. s. sciurus (Fruhstorfer, 1904) (south-eastern Borneo)
- A. s. strix (Fruhstorfer, 1904) (northern Borneo)
- A. s. susa Hewitson, 1861 (Sumatra)

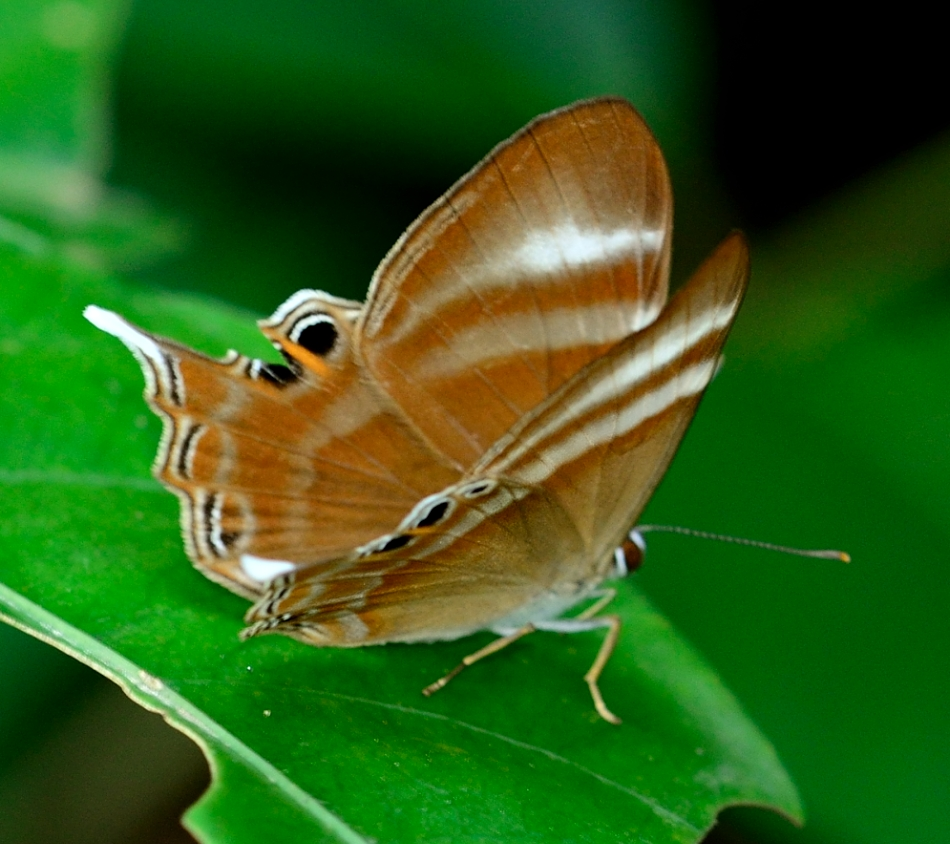

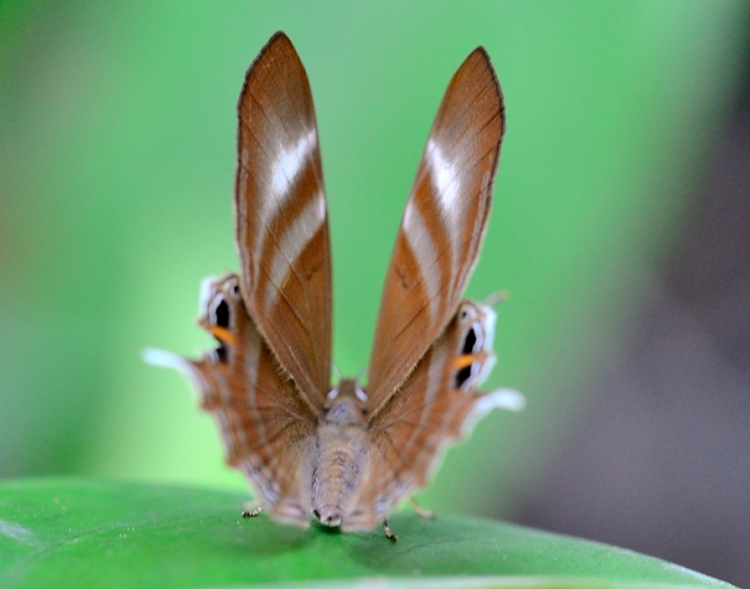

== See also ==
- Riodinidae
- List of butterflies of India (Riodinidae)
