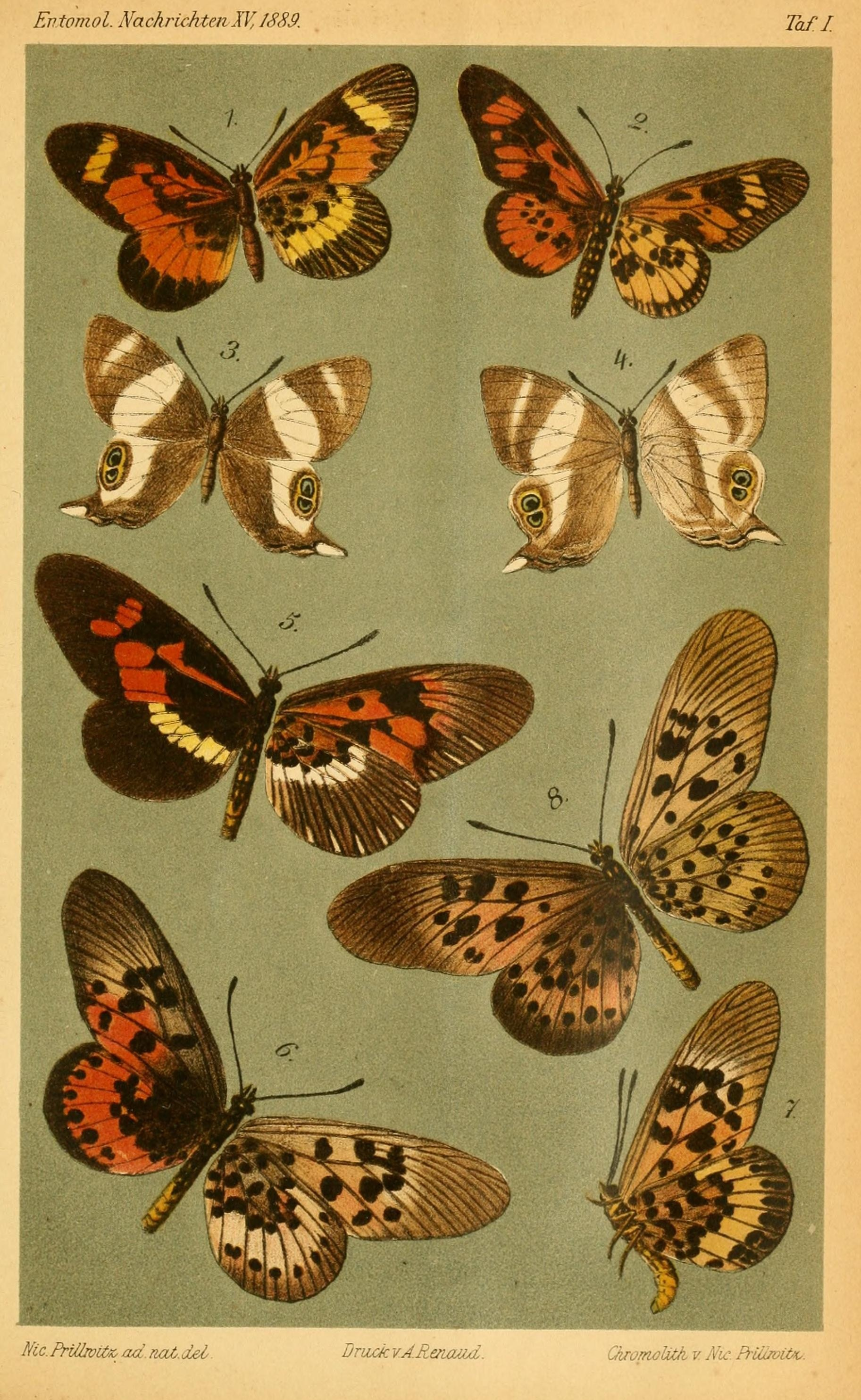
- Figures 3 and 4

Scientific classification
- Kingdom: Animalia
- Phylum: Arthropoda
- Class: Insecta
- Order: Lepidoptera
- Family: Riodinidae
- Genus: Afriodinia
- Species: A. rogersi

Binomial name
- Afriodinia rogersi (H. Druce, 1878)

Synonyms
- Abisara geryon Staudinger, 1888; Abisara simulacris Riley, 1932

= Afriodinia rogersi =

Light banded Judy

Species of butterfly

Afriodinia rogersi, the light banded Judy, is a butterfly in the family Riodinidae. The species was first described by Herbert Druce in 1878. It is found in Nigeria, Cameroon, Angola, the Democratic Republic of the Congo, Uganda, Tanzania and Zambia. The habitat consists of shady areas in forests and open areas in submontane forests.

The larvae possibly feed on Maesa species.

== Subspecies ==
- Afriodinia rogersi rogersi (Nigeria, Cameroon, Angola, Democratic Republic of the Congo, Zambia)
- Afriodinia rogersi simulacris Riley, 1932 (Democratic Republic of the Congo: Ituri, Uganda, north-western Tanzania)
