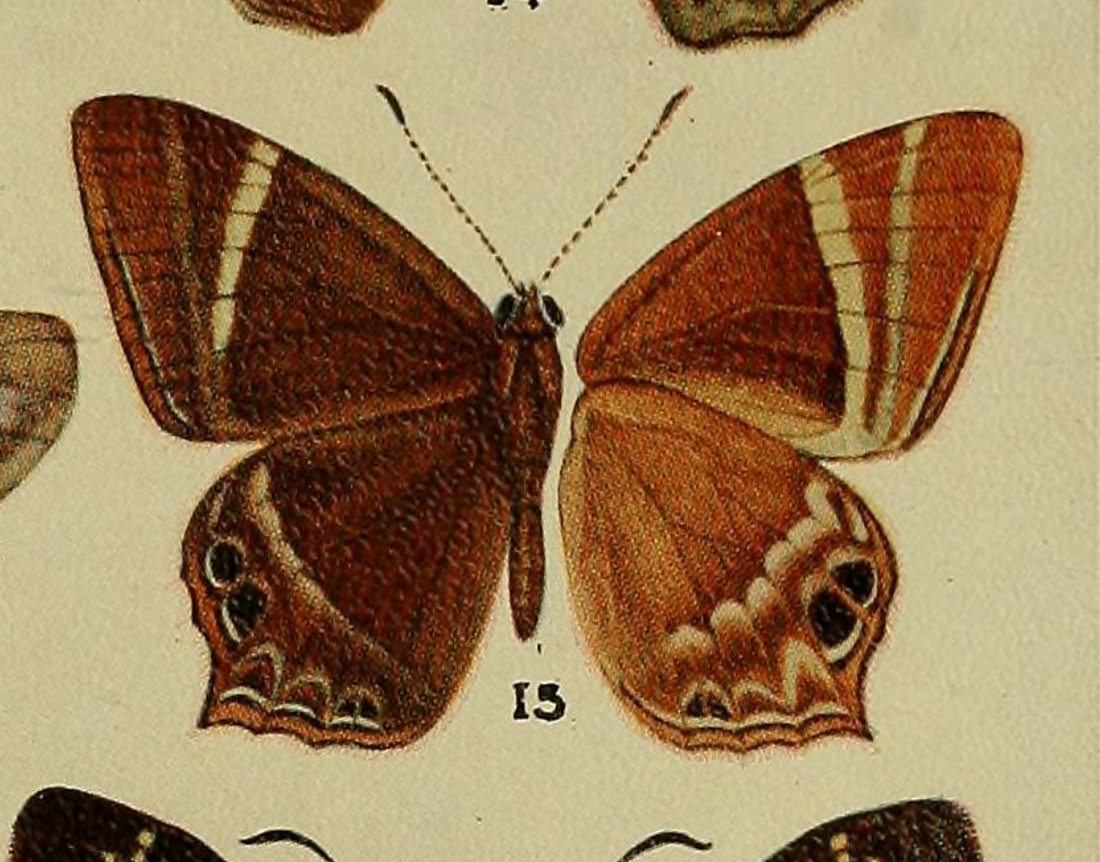

Scientific classification
- Kingdom: Animalia
- Phylum: Arthropoda
- Clade: Pancrustacea
- Class: Insecta
- Order: Lepidoptera
- Superfamily: Papilionoidea
- Family: Riodinidae
- Genus: Archigenes
- Species: A. attenuata

Binomial name
- Archigenes attenuata Tytler, 1915

= Archigenes attenuata =

Species of butterfly

Archigenes attenuata, also known as the short-tailed judy or the attenuated judy, is a butterfly in the family Riodinidae. It is found from Manipur in India.

== Description ==
This species is similar to Archigenes atlas from Java but the discal band in attenuata is narrower and curves inwards at the costa while in atlas it curves outwards at the costa.
