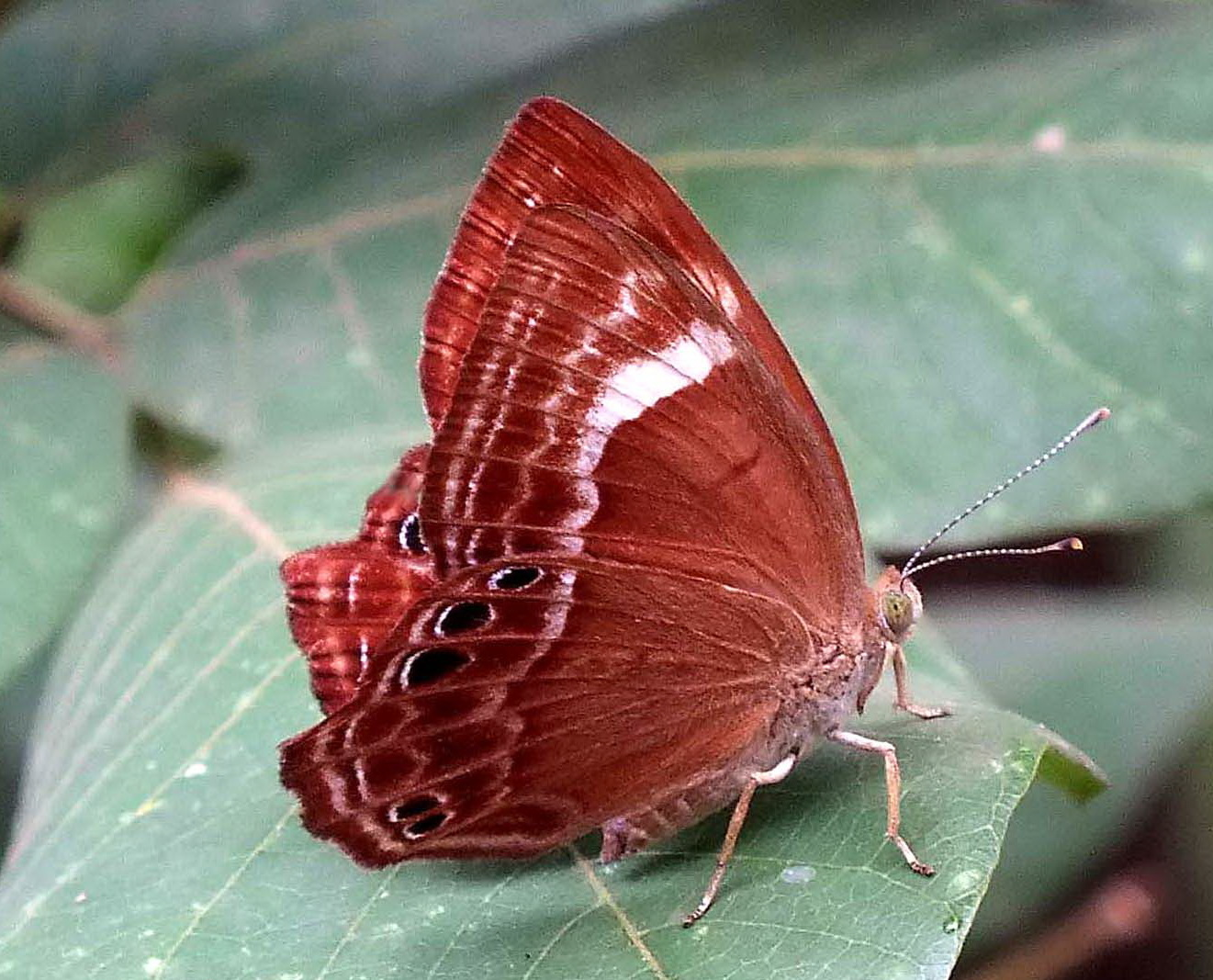
- Abisara geza niya

Scientific classification
- Kingdom: Animalia
- Phylum: Arthropoda
- Class: Insecta
- Order: Lepidoptera
- Family: Riodinidae
- Genus: Abisara
- Species: A. geza

Binomial name
- Abisara geza Fruhstorfer, 1904

Synonyms
- Abisara kausambi geza Fruhstorfer, 1904; Abisara kausambi litavicus Fruhstorfer, 1912; Abisara kausambi niasana Fruhstorfer, 1904; Abisara niya Fruhstorfer, 1914

= Abisara geza =

Species of insect

Abisara geza, the Spotted Judy, is a butterfly in the family Riodinidae. It is found in Asia.

== Subspecies ==
- Abisara geza geza
- Abisara geza litavicus Fruhstorfer, 1912 (northern Borneo)
- Abisara geza niasana Fruhstorfer, 1904 (Nias)
- Abisara geza niya Fruhstorfer, 1914 (Peninsular Malaya, Singapore, Riouw Islands)
- Abisara geza erilda Fruhstorfer, 1914 (western and southern Java)
- Abisara geza sura Bennett, 1950 (Sumatra)
- Abisara geza latifasciata Inoue & Kawazoe, 1964
