= Archigenes miyazakii =

Scientific classification
- Kingdom: Animalia
- Phylum: Arthropoda
- Class: Insecta
- Order: Lepidoptera
- Family: Riodinidae
- Genus: Archigenes
- Species: A. miyazakii

Binomial name
- Archigenes miyazakii (K. Saito & T. Saito, 2005)

Synonyms
- Abisara miyazakii

Species of butterfly

Archigenes miyazakii or Two-spotted Judy, is a butterfly in the family Riodinidae. It is found in Asia.

== Subspecies ==
- Archigenes miyazakii miyazakii (Vietnam)
- Archigenes miyazakii shigehoi Kot. Saito & T. Saito, 2005 (Laos)
