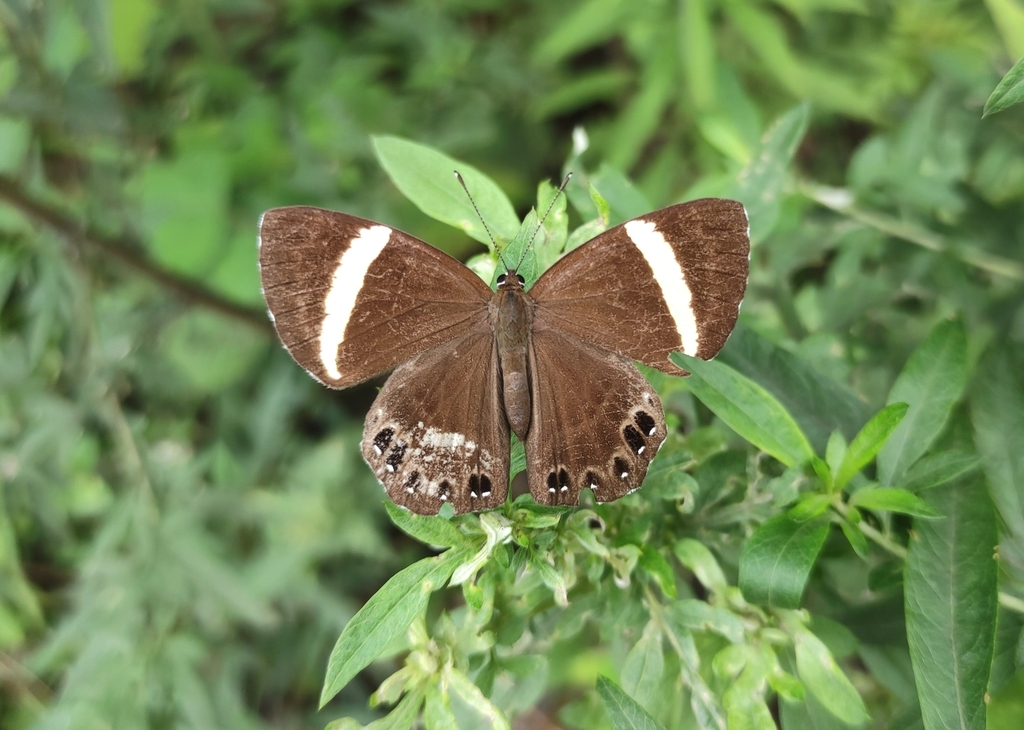

Scientific classification
- Kingdom: Animalia
- Phylum: Arthropoda
- Class: Insecta
- Order: Lepidoptera
- Family: Riodinidae
- Genus: Spitosa
- Species: S. fylloides

Binomial name
- Spitosa fylloides (Moore, 1902)

Synonyms
- Sospita fylla magdala Fruhstorfer, 1904

= Spitosa fylloides =

Species of butterfly

Spitosa fylloides is a butterfly in the family Riodinidae. It is found in Asia.

It was the first butterfly species of the Riodinidae to have its mitochondrial DNA sequenced. The mitochondrial DNA has 15,301 base pairs.

== Subspecies ==
- Spitosa fylloides fylloides (western China)
- Spitosa fylloides magdala (Fruhstorfer, 1904) (Indo China)
