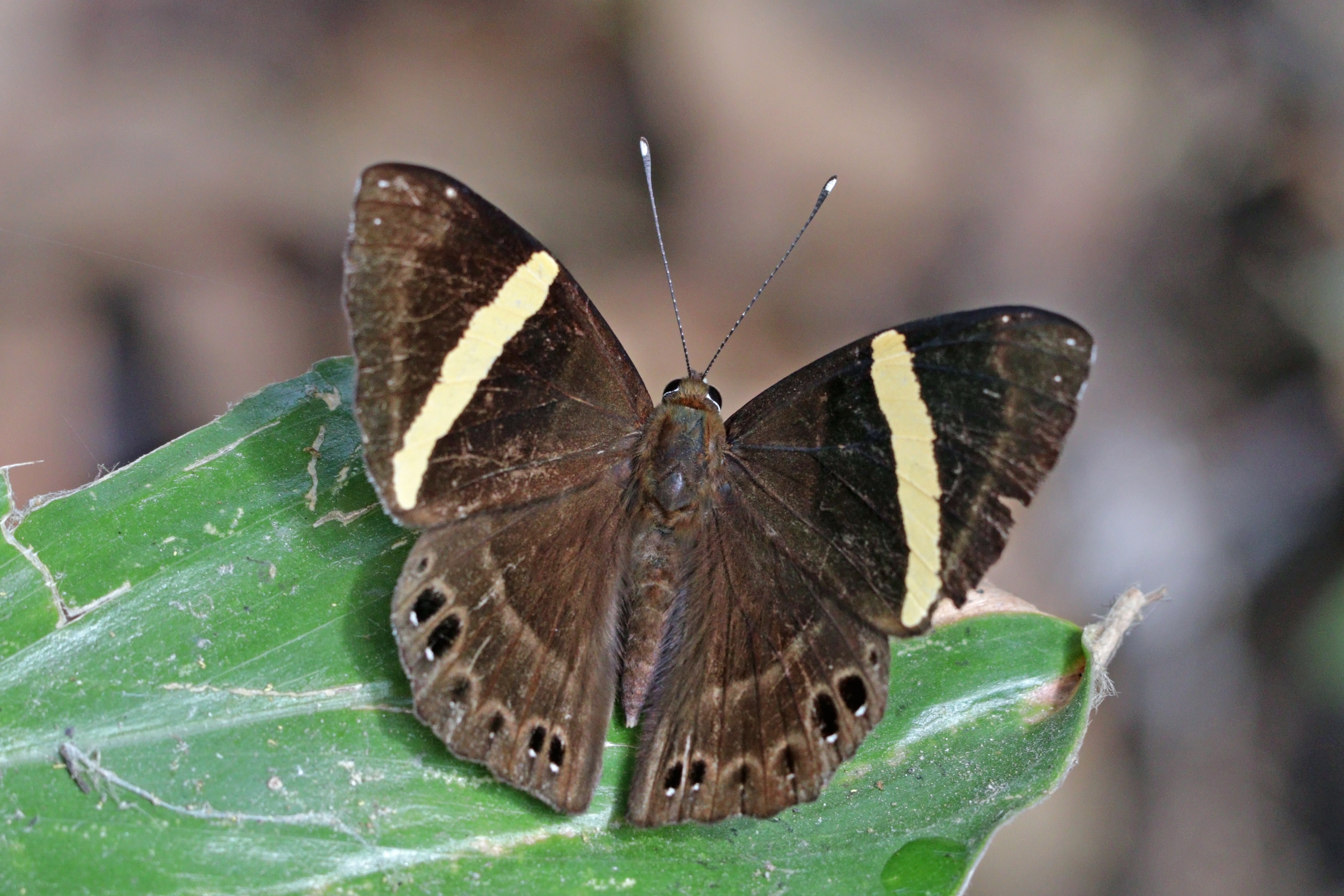
- Male S. fylla
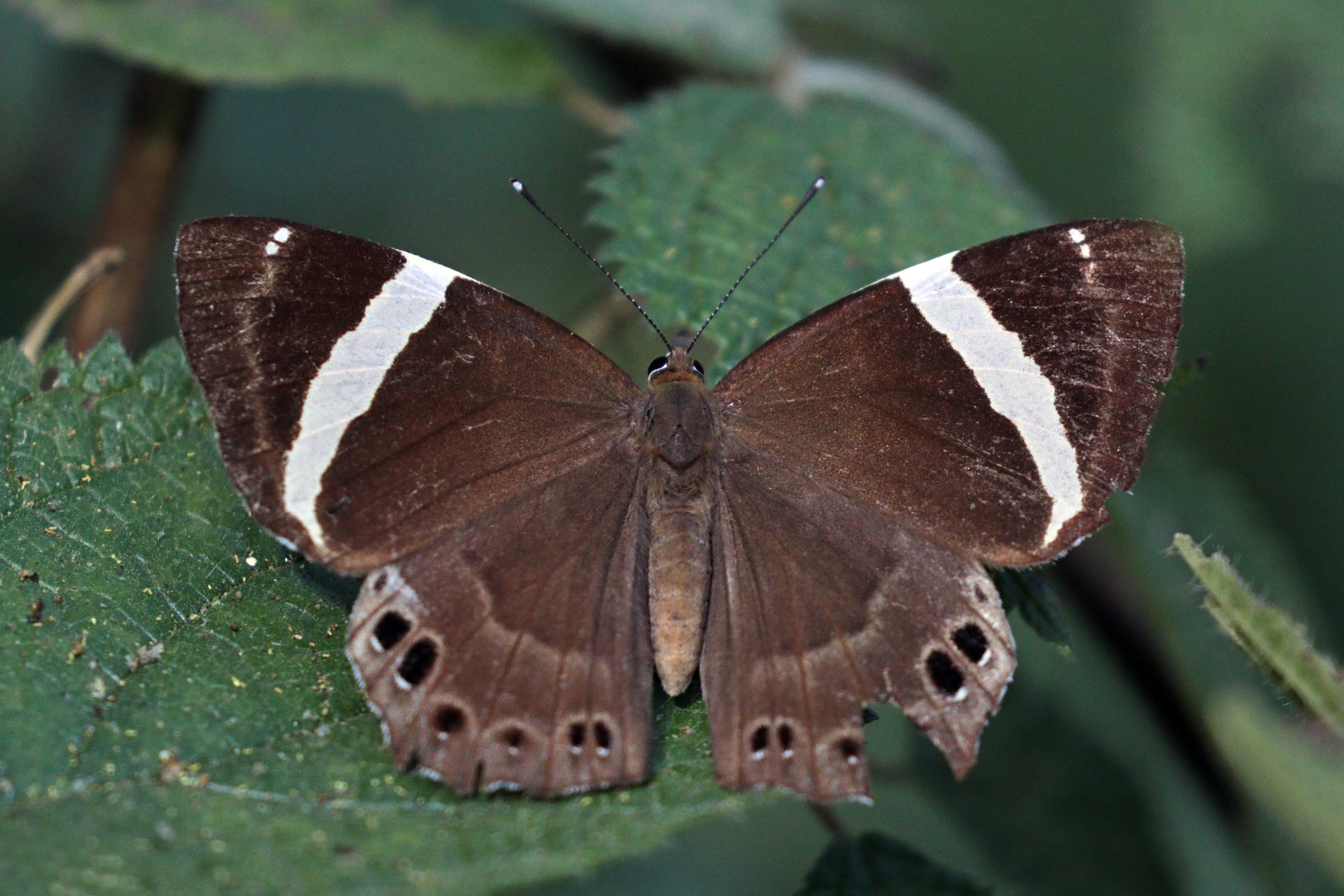
- Female S. fylla both found in Godawari, Nepal

Scientific classification
- Kingdom: Animalia
- Phylum: Arthropoda
- Clade: Pancrustacea
- Class: Insecta
- Order: Lepidoptera
- Family: Riodinidae
- Genus: Spitosa
- Species: S. fylla

Binomial name
- Spitosa fylla Westwood, 1851

= Spitosa fylla =

Dark Judy

Species of butterfly

Spitosa Fylla, commonly called the Dark Judy, is a small butterfly species that belongs to the metalmark family Riodinidae. It is found in Southern, South-East and East Asia. S. fylla has an average wingspan of 52–62 mm.

== Description ==
An excerpt from Charles Thomas Bingham's (1905) The Fauna of British India, Including Ceylon and Burma, Butterflies Vol. 1: describes a male Spitosa fylla as smaller with a rich, dark brown hue, its forewing striped by a oblique cream-colored band, that is "bent slightly inwards at each end". Its hindwing is marked by seven oval black spots, each surrounded by a white ring of varying hues. The larger two of these spots are clearly defined, but the others appear to be faded. The head, thorax, and abdomen are a dark, dull brown, lightening in color beneath the palpi (small, finger-like appendages located on the head, just in front of the mouthparts), and on the underside of the chest.

Parts of an adult butterfly

Terminologies used for butterfly descriptions

The females are similar in appearance, although the termen of the hindwing are more prominently angled outwardly from the central thorax. The upper side of the wings are primarily a paler, duller brown. The oblique band on the forewing is a brighter, purer white than the cream-colored stripe on the male. Its hindwing is marked by only six (not seven, like the males) black spots in a curve at the bottom edge of the hindwing, and are larger and more clearly defined than in the male. The underside of the hindwing is a pale brown, with similar markings to the male; although the middle two spots of the series are less distinct, and there is no trace of the surrounding white ring. The females also have a white spot at the apex of the antenna, and, underneath, the palpi, thorax, and abdomen are marked with white.

== Distribution and habitat ==
These butterflies are located in Asia, and are native to the Himalayas, from Mussoorie to Sikkim; the hills of Assam, Burma, and Tenasserim.

== See also ==
- Riodinidae
- List of butterflies of India
- List of butterflies of India (Riodinidae)
