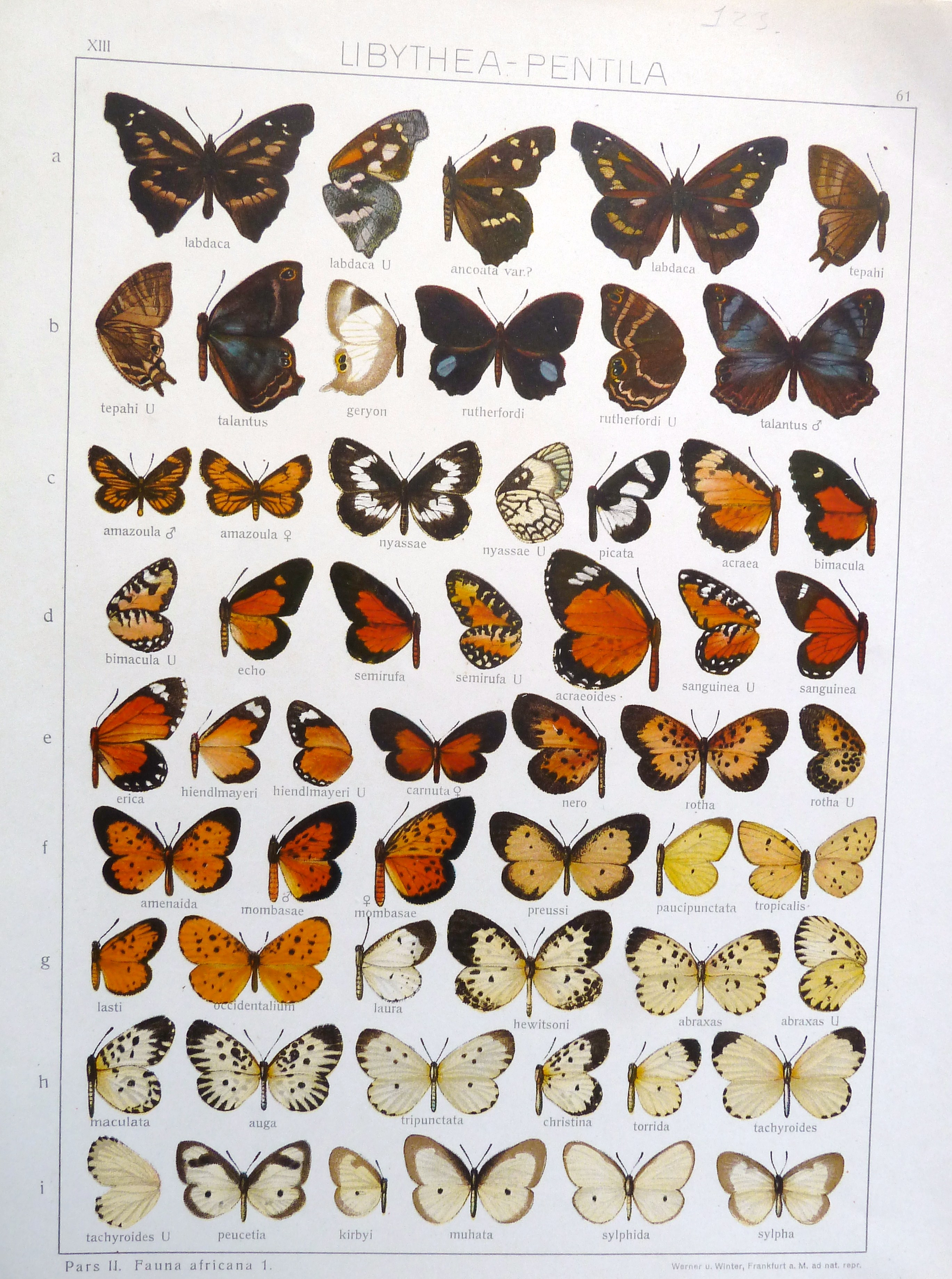
- Afriodinia rutherfordii depicted in Adalbert Seitz's Fauna Africana (row "b", 4th and 5th images)

Scientific classification
- Kingdom: Animalia
- Phylum: Arthropoda
- Class: Insecta
- Order: Lepidoptera
- Family: Riodinidae
- Genus: Afriodinia
- Species: A. rutherfordii

Binomial name
- Afriodinia rutherfordii (Hewitson, 1874)

Synonyms
- Abisara rutherfordii cyclops f. caecata Riley, 1932; Abisara rutherfordii herwigi ab. lunula Dufrane, 1945

= Afriodinia rutherfordii =

Species of butterfly

Afriodinia rutherfordii, the scalloped Judy, is a butterfly in the family Riodinidae. It is found in Nigeria, Cameroon, Gabon, the Republic of the Congo, the Democratic Republic of the Congo, Uganda, Rwanda and Tanzania. The habitat consists of primary forests.

== Subspecies ==
- Afriodinia rutherfordii rutherfordii (Nigeria: south and the Cross River loop, western Cameroon)
- Afriodinia rutherfordii cyclops Riley, 1932 (Uganda, Rwanda, Tanzania, Democratic Republic of the Congo: Uele, Ituri, Tshopo, Sankuru and Lualaba)
- Afriodinia rutherfordii herwigii Dewitz, 1887 (eastern Cameroon, Gabon, Congo)
