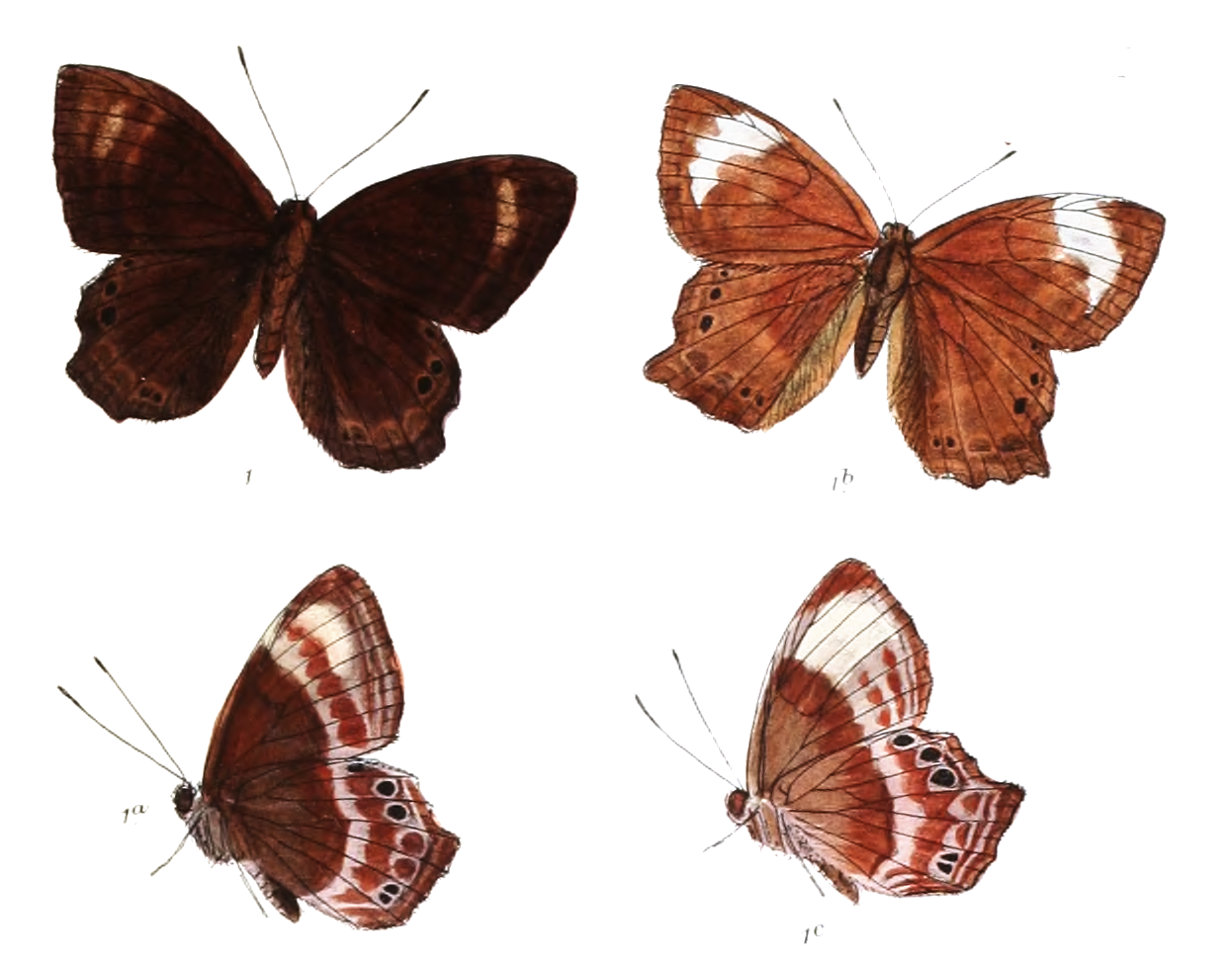

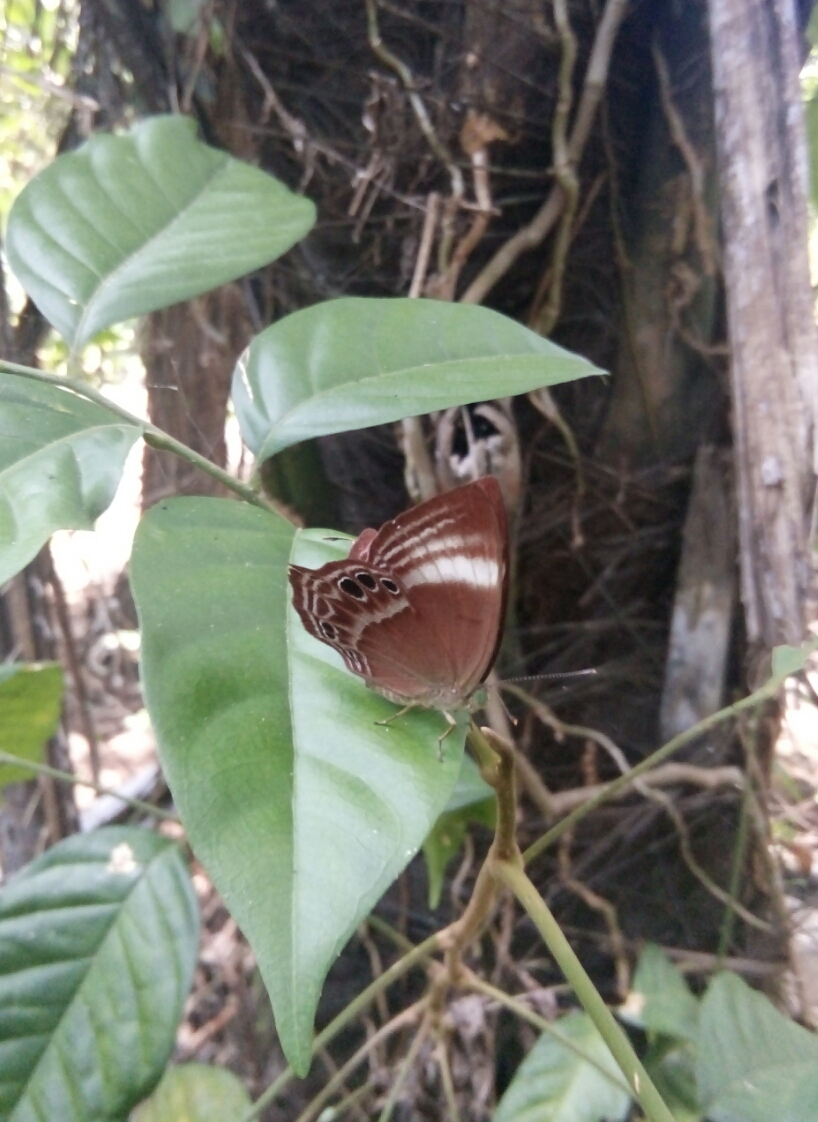
- from Buladu, North Gorontalo

Scientific classification
- Kingdom: Animalia
- Phylum: Arthropoda
- Class: Insecta
- Order: Lepidoptera
- Family: Riodinidae
- Genus: Abisara
- Species: A. kausambi

Binomial name
- Abisara kausambi (C. Felder & R. Felder, 1860)

= Abisara kausambi =

Straight plum judy

Species of butterfly

Abisara kausambi, the straight plum Judy, is a small but striking butterfly found in the Indomalayan realm that belongs to the Punches and Judies, that is, the family Riodinidae.

- A. k. kausambi Manipur to Burma, Malaya, Borneo, Sumatra Peninsular Malaya
- A. k. tina Fruhstorfer, 1904 Java
- A. k. sabina Stichel, 1924 Sulawesi
- A. k. aja Fruhstorfer, 1904 Palawan
- A. k. asoka Bennett, 1950 Borneo
- A. k. daphne Bennett, 1950 Nias
- A. k. disparilis Riley, 1945 Mentawai
- A. k. sala Fruhstorfer, 1914 Borneo
- A. k. stasinus Fruhstorfer, 1912 Bangka, Belitung

== Biology ==
The larva feeds on Embelia

== See also ==
- Riodinidae
- List of butterflies of India
- List of butterflies of India (Riodinidae)
