= Afriodinia cameroonensis =

Scientific classification
- Kingdom: Animalia
- Phylum: Arthropoda
- Class: Insecta
- Order: Lepidoptera
- Family: Riodinidae
- Genus: Afriodinia
- Species: A. cameroonensis

Binomial name
- Afriodinia cameroonensis (Callaghan, 2003)

Species of butterfly

Afriodinia cameroonensis, the Cameroon Judy, is a butterfly in the family Riodinidae. It is found in Nigeria and Cameroon. The habitat consists of montane secondary forests, where it is found along streams.
