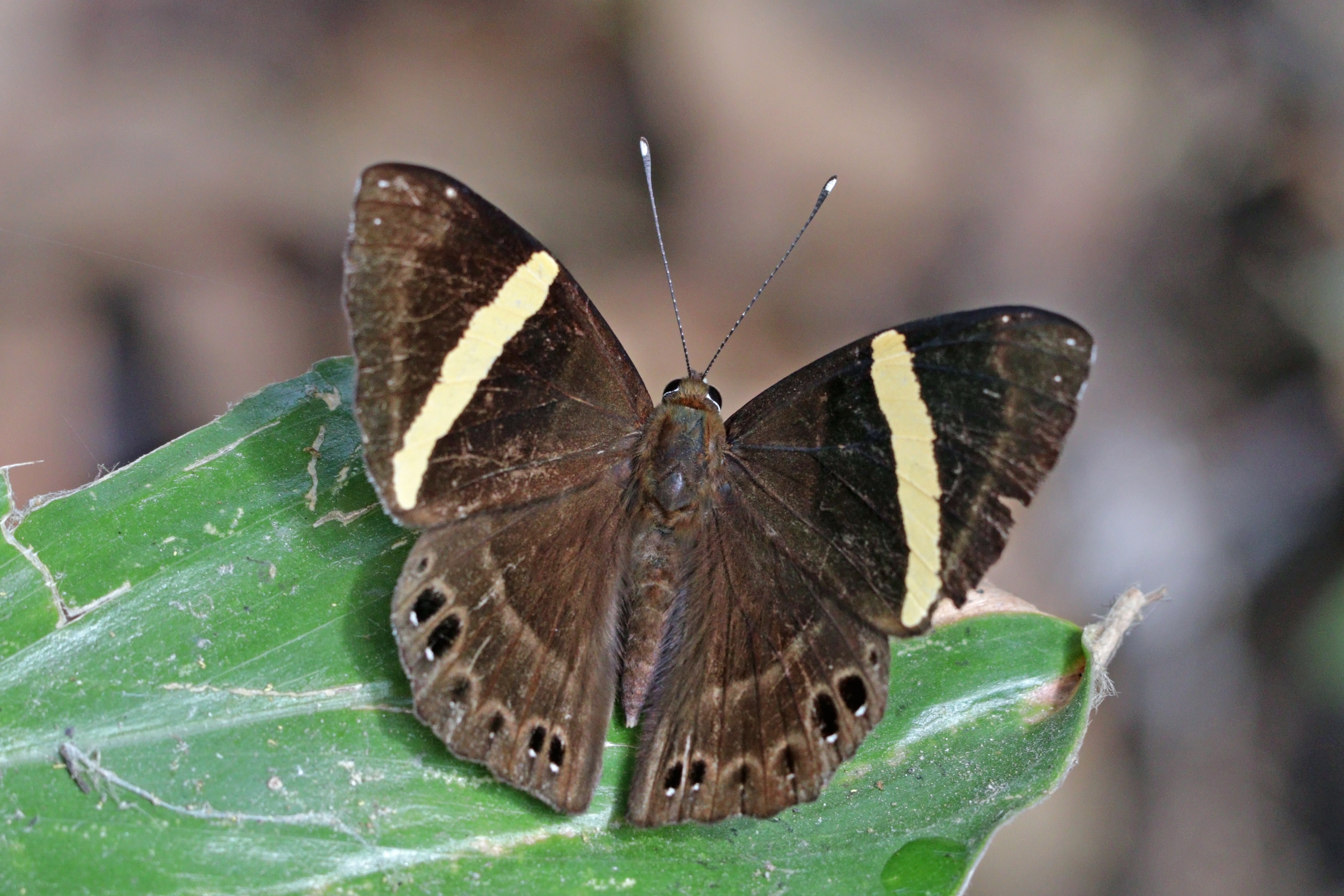
- Spitosa fylla

Scientific classification
- Kingdom: Animalia
- Phylum: Arthropoda
- Clade: Pancrustacea
- Class: Insecta
- Order: Lepidoptera
- Family: Riodinidae
- Subfamily: Nemeobiinae
- Tribe: Nemeobiini
- Subtribe: Nemeobiina
- Genus: Spitosa; Espeland, Huang & Inayoshi, 2024

Type species
- Taxila fylla Westwood, 1851

= Spitosa =

Genus of butterflies

Spitosa is a genus of butterflies in the family Riodinidae. Species in the genus were formerly included in the genus Abisara but the genus was found to be non-monophyletic in studies, forcing the separation of Abisara in the strict sense from the other species placed in that genus. Spitosa is an anagram of Sospita, an older genus name proposed by Hewitson in 1861 but found to be a homonym. The species in the genus Spitosa are separated from other genera by the narrow and clear transverse band on the forewing disc extending from the costa to the tornus. The hind wing has only a slight tail-like projection. The male genitalia are also distinct in having a central plate and juxta, a broader valve with a rounded tip unlike the bifurcate tip in Abisara.

Species that are now included in Spitosa are:

- Spitosa fylla (Westwood, 1851)
- Spitosa fylloides (Moore, 1901)
- Spitosa magdala (Fruhstorfer, 1904)
- Spitosa sobrina (Mell, 1923)
