= Afriodinia =

Scientific classification
- Kingdom: Animalia
- Phylum: Arthropoda
- Class: Insecta
- Order: Lepidoptera
- Family: Riodinidae
- Subfamily: Nemeobiinae
- Genus: Afriodinia d'Abrera, 2009

Type species
- Papilio gerontes Fabricius, 1781

Genus of butterflies

Afriodinia is a genus of butterflies in the family Riodinidae. Species in the genus were formerly placed in the genus Abisara which was found to be polyphyletic. The genus Abisara is now found only in Asia while Afriodinia is Afrotropical.

The species that are included in the genus are:

- Afriodinia caeca (Rebel, 1914)
- Afriodinia cameroonensis (Callaghan, 2003)
- Afriodinia delicata (Lathy, 1901)
- Afriodinia gerontes (Fabricius, 1781)
- Afriodinia intermedia (Aurivillius, 1895)
- Afriodinia lico (Collins, 1990)
- Afriodinia neavei (Riley, 1932)
- Afriodinia rogersi (Druce, 1878)
- Afriodinia rutherfordii (Hewitson, 1874)
- Afriodinia talantus (Aurivillius, 1891)
- Afriodinia tantalus (Hewitson, 1861)
- Afriodinia zanzibarica (Collins, 1990)
