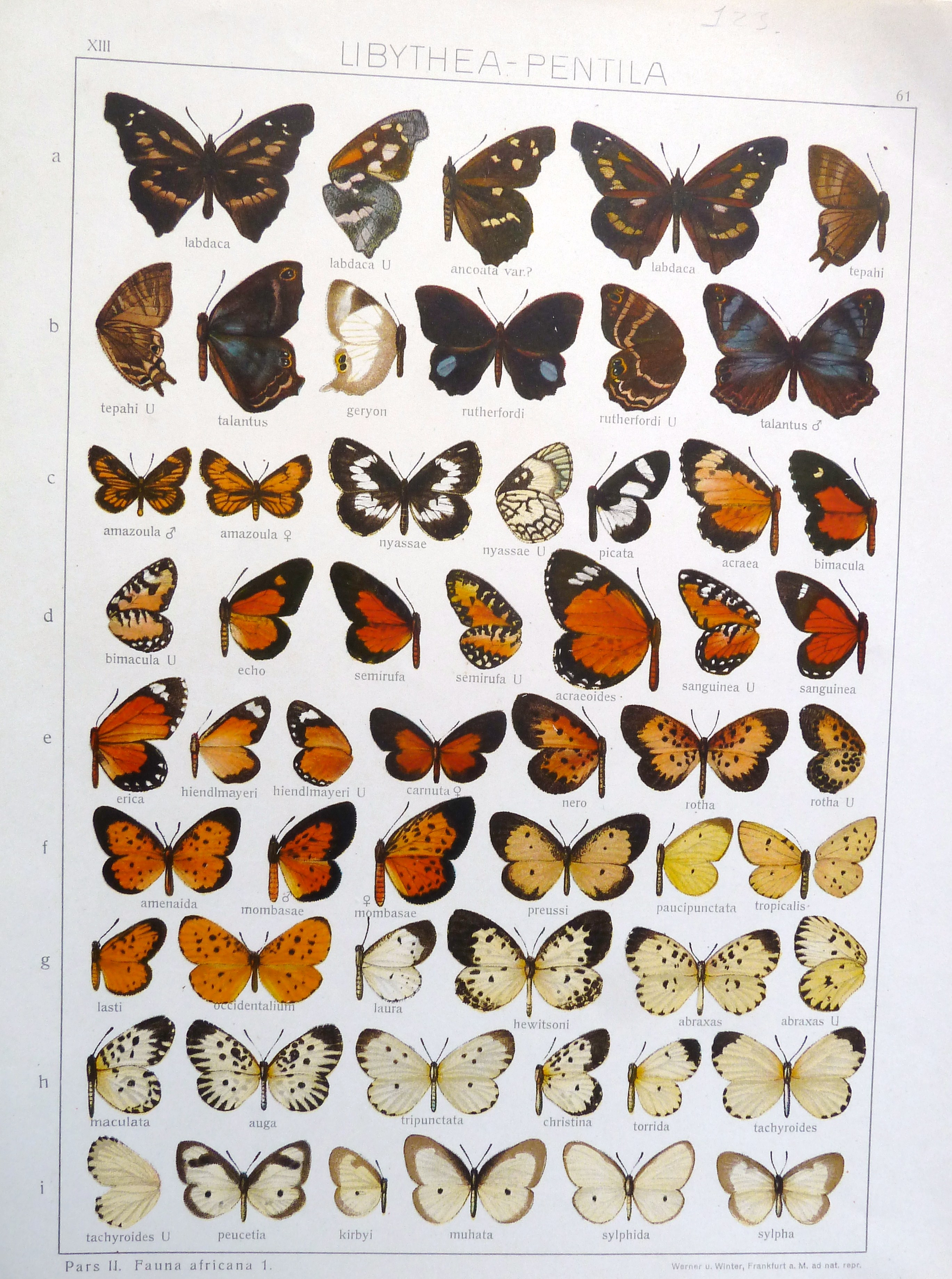
- In Adalbert Seitz's Fauna Africana (row "b", 2nd and 6th images)

Scientific classification
- Kingdom: Animalia
- Phylum: Arthropoda
- Class: Insecta
- Order: Lepidoptera
- Family: Riodinidae
- Genus: Afriodinia
- Species: A. talantus

Binomial name
- Afriodinia talantus (Aurivillius, 1891)

Synonyms
- Abisara talantus f. muanensis Dufrane, 1953

= Afriodinia talantus =

Species of butterfly

Afriodinia talantus, the blue Judy, is a butterfly in the family Riodinidae. It is found in Nigeria (south and the Cross River loop) and Cameroon. The habitat consists of primary, dense forests.
