= Afriodinia delicata =

Delicate Judy

Conservation status
- Least Concern (IUCN 3.1)

Scientific classification
- Kingdom: Animalia
- Phylum: Arthropoda
- Class: Insecta
- Order: Lepidoptera
- Family: Riodinidae
- Genus: Afriodinia
- Species: A. delicata

Binomial name
- Afriodinia delicata (Lathy, 1901)

Subspecies
- A. d. subsp. delicata; A. d. subsp. tanzania Kielland, 1986; A. d. subsp. zanzibarica Collins, 1990

Species of butterfly

Afriodinia delicata, the delicate Judy is a butterfly in the family Riodinidae. It is found in Tanzania and Malawi.

== Geographic distribution ==
Afriodinia delicata is widely distributed in the submontane forests of the Malawi highlands. Subspecies tanzania occurs in the Usambara, Nguu, Nguru, and Udzungwa mountains of northeastern Tanzania. Subspecies zanzibarica is restricted to Zanzibar Island.

== Ecology ==
The species can be found in submontane and lowland forests east of the main Rift Valley, including the Eastern Arc forests in Tanzania.

== Subspecies ==
- Afriodinia delicata delicata (highlands of Malawi)
- Afriodinia delicata tanzania Kielland, 1986 (eastern Tanzania)
- Afriodinia delicata zanzibarica Collins, 1990 (Tanzania: Zanzibar)
