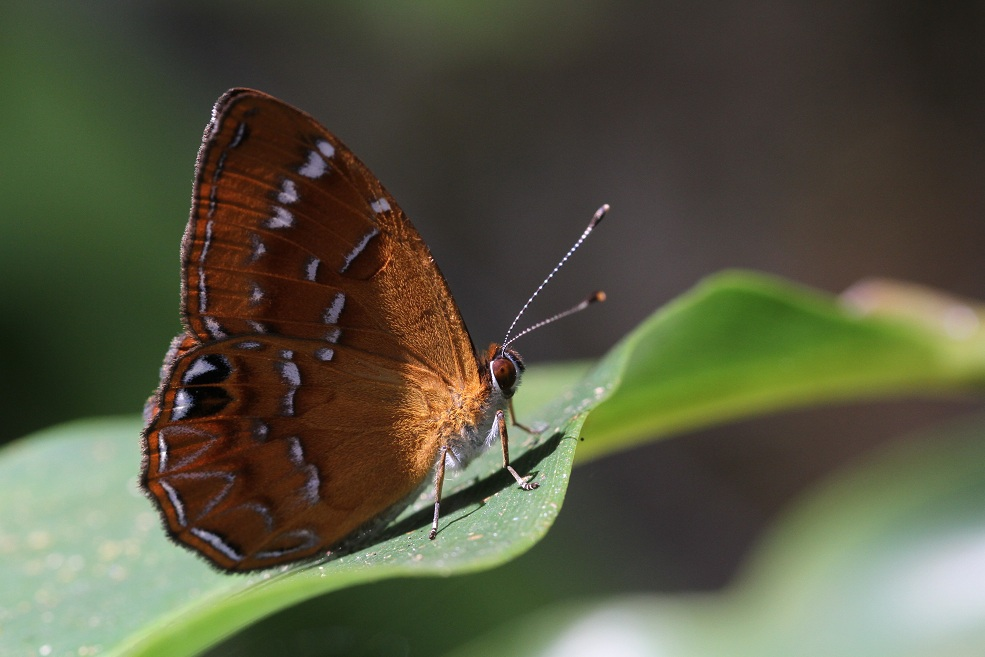

Scientific classification
- Kingdom: Animalia
- Phylum: Arthropoda
- Clade: Pancrustacea
- Class: Insecta
- Order: Lepidoptera
- Family: Riodinidae
- Genus: Sibosia; Espeland, Huang & Inayoshi, 2024
- Species: S. burnii

Binomial name
- Sibosia burnii (de Nicéville, 1895)

Synonyms
- Taxila burnii de Nicéville, 1895; Abisara burnii

= Sibosia =

Monotypic genus of butterflies

Sibosia burnii or white-spotted judy, is a butterfly in the family Riodinidae. It is found in the Indomalayan realm. Sibosia burnii is found from the Naga Hills in India, eastward into Myanmar, central Indochina, including northern Vietnam, where it inhabits montane forest habitats. It was formerly placed in the genus Abisara but that genus was found to be polyphyletic, leading to the placement under a new generic name.

The genus Sibosia was created in 2024 as an anagram of Sosibia, a name used by Fruhstorfer in 1914 which was a junior homonym of a stick-insect genus erected by Stål in 1875. The genus is differentiated from Abisara by the short series of discal and postdiscal lines or dots on the underside of the forewing. The hindwing does not have a tail projection. The male genitalia in Sibosia lack external processes on the valves. Sibosia currently includes only one species and its subspecies.

- Sibosia burnii (Nicéville, 1895) - (nominate form from Assam)
  - Sibosia burnii assus (Fruhstorfer, 1914) - (southern China)
  - Sibosia burnii etymander (Fruhstorfer, 1908) - (Taiwan)
  - Sibosia burnii timaeus (Fruhstorfer, 1904) - (northern Indo China)
