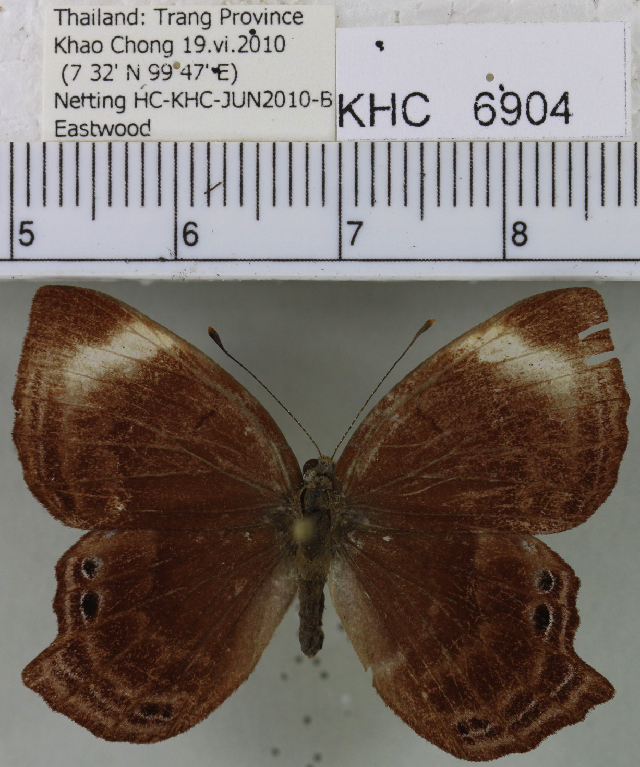

Scientific classification
- Kingdom: Animalia
- Phylum: Arthropoda
- Clade: Pancrustacea
- Class: Insecta
- Order: Lepidoptera
- Family: Riodinidae
- Genus: Abisara
- Species: A. saturata

Binomial name
- Abisara saturata (Moore, 1878)

Synonyms
- Sospita saturata Moore, 1878; Abisara kausambioides de Nicéville & Martin, [1896]; Abisara kausambioides tera Fruhstorfer, 1904

= Abisara saturata =

Species of butterfly

Abisara saturata is a butterfly in the family Riodinidae. It is found in the Indomalayan realm.

== Subspecies ==
- A. s. saturata (Hainan)
- A. s. amaga Fruhstorfer, 1914 (Bangka)
- A. s. baraka Bennett, 1950 (Manipur)
- A. s. corbeti Bennett, 1950 (Mindanao)
- A. s. iliaca Fruhstorfer, 1912 (Nias)
- A. s. kausambioides de Nicéville & Martin, [1896] (Peninsular Malaya, Langkawi, Singapore) — Malayan plum Judy
- A. s. maya Bennet, 1950 (Myanmar, Thailand)
- A. s. meta Fruhstorfer, 1904
- A. s. paha Fruhstorfer, 1914 (north-eastern Sumatra)
- A. s. tera Fruhstorfer, 1904 (northern Borneo)
