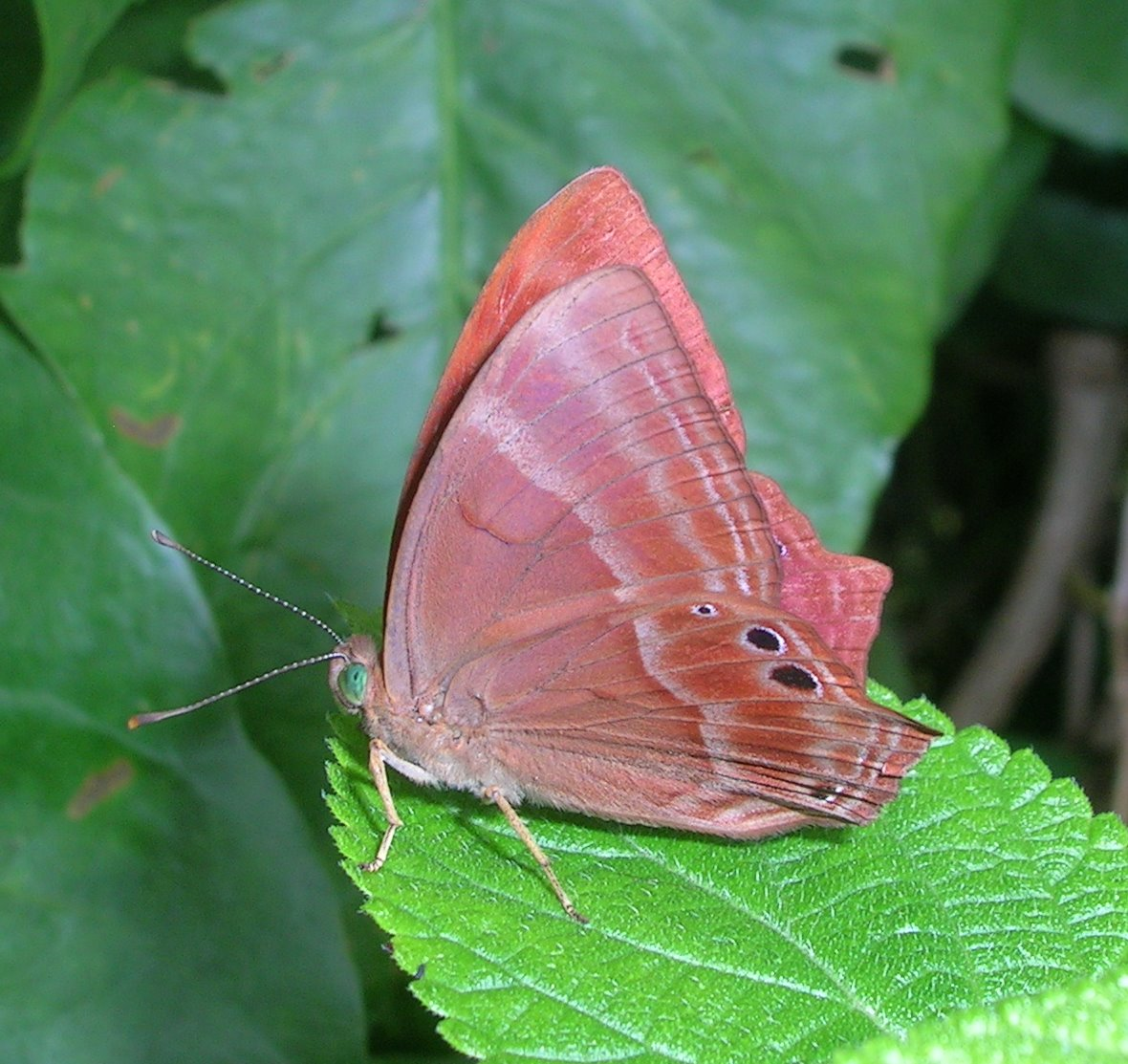
- A. echerius
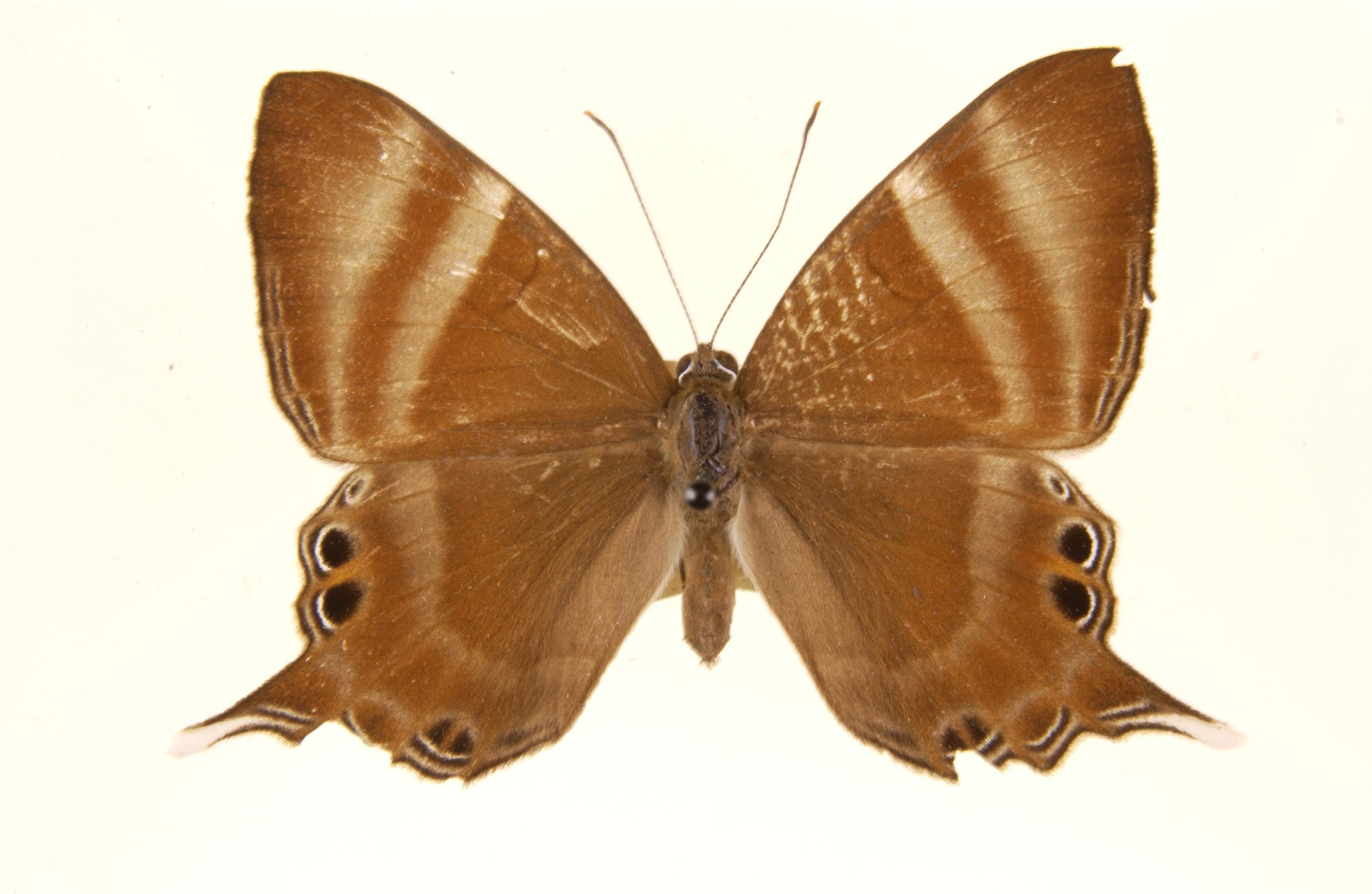
- A. bifasciata

Scientific classification
- Kingdom: Animalia
- Phylum: Arthropoda
- Class: Insecta
- Order: Lepidoptera
- Family: Riodinidae
- Subfamily: Nemeobiinae
- Genus: Abisara; C. Felder & R. Felder, 1860

Type species
- Abisara kausambi C. Felder & R. Felder, 1860

Species
- See text

Synonyms
- Sospita Hewitson, 1861; Sosibia Fruhstorfer, 1914

= Abisara =

Genus of butterflies

Abisara is a genus of butterflies in the family Riodinidae, with species found only in Asia. The genus formerly included African species but it was found to be polyphyletic in 2015. Several species formerly included in the genus were then moved to Afriodinia, Archigenes, Sibosia and Spitosa.

Most species in the genus have the common name Judy.

== Species ==
- Abisara abnormis Moore, 1884
- Abisara bifasciata Moore, 1877
- Abisara echerius (Stoll, 1790)
- Abisara geza Fruhstorfer, 1904
- Abisara kausambi (C. Felder & R. Felder, 1860)
- Abisara saturata Moore, 1878
