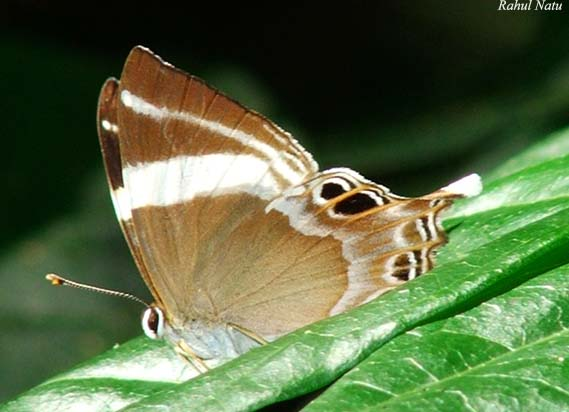

Scientific classification
- Kingdom: Animalia
- Phylum: Arthropoda
- Class: Insecta
- Order: Lepidoptera
- Family: Riodinidae
- Genus: Archigenes
- Species: A. neophron

Binomial name
- Archigenes neophron (Guerin, 1843)

= Archigenes neophron =

Tailed Judy

Species of butterfly

Archigenes neophron, the tailed Judy, is a small butterfly found in India that belongs to the Punches and Judies family (Riodinidae). They were formerly placed in the genus Abisara but have since been moved to a separate group based on phylogenetic studies.

== Description ==
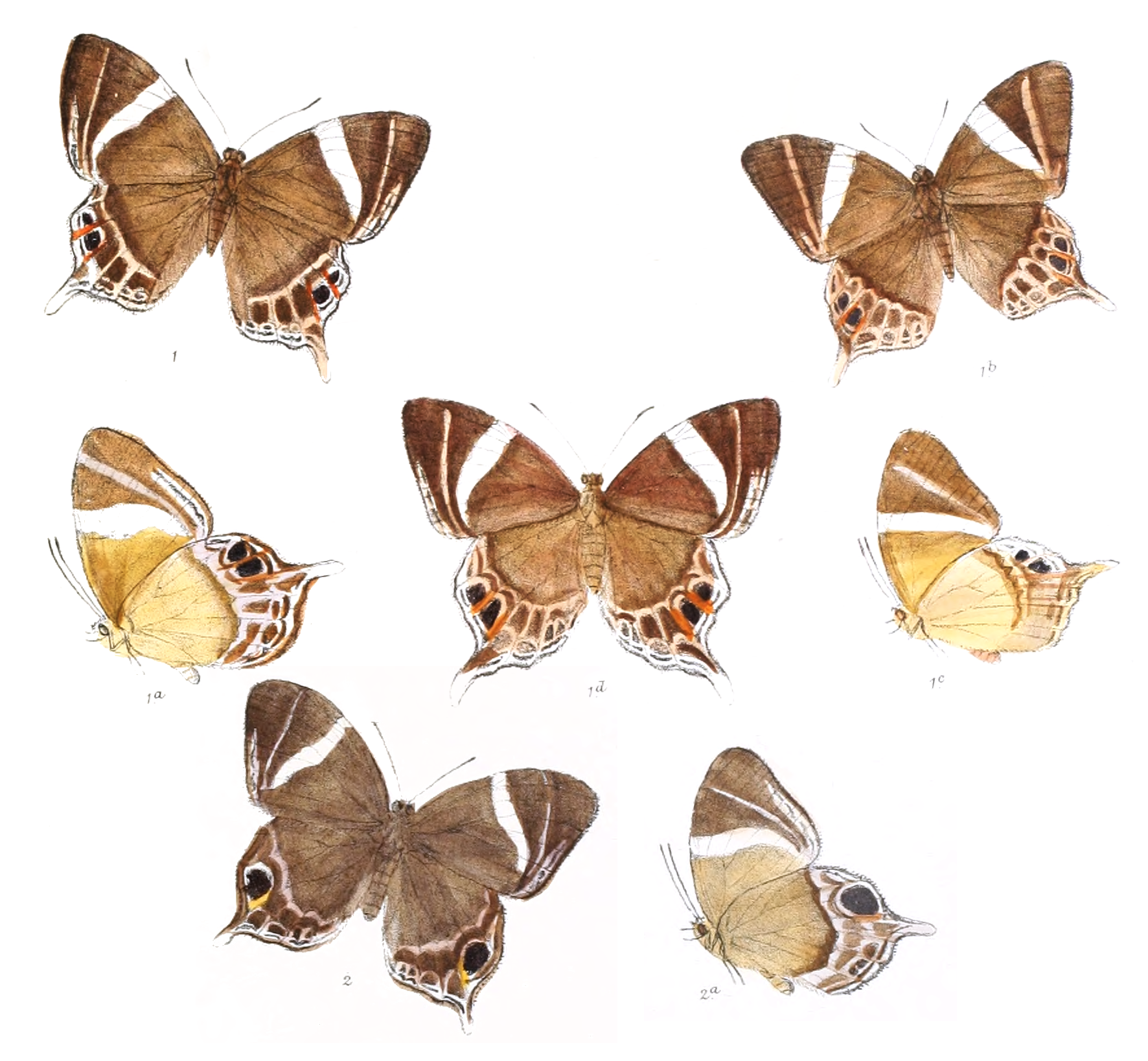

Termen of hindwing has a long tail at apex of vein 4, the portion above it prominently emarginate. Upperside is brown varying in tint, but generally paler in the female than in the male. Forewing with a comparatively broad oblique white band from middle of costa to near apex of vein 1 above the tornal angle, narrowed posteriorly; beyond this an ill-defined narrow, somewhat more erect, pale dusky-white band from costa to dorsal margin, curving slightly round the tornal termination of the inner broader band; an inner and an outer slender abbreviated subterminal line extending in the female from vein 1 to vein 4, shorter in the male. Hindwing has a postdiscal sinuous, ill-defined, broad transverse band, paler than the ground colour, bordered on the inner and outer sides by very obscure lunular dull whitish lines, followed by two slender pure white subterminal broken lines that in interspaces 4 and 5 are bordered inwardly by large jet-black spots; these spots divided by a conspicuous Ferruginous line along vein 5; the cilia and apex of tail, and in some specimens the apex of wing and the costal margin, narrowly snow-white. Underside similar, with similar markings, but the ground colour much paler, especially on the basal halves of the wings, the markings more clearly defined and broader; on the hindwing the white lines bordering the post-discal broad band have a purplish tinge, and in interspace 1 there are two inner obscure subterminal triangular black spots. Antennae brown, ringed with white; head, thorax and abdomen pale brown; beneath, the palpi, thorax and abdomen more or less whitish.

== Subspecies ==
- A. n. neophron Assam, Himalayas (East from Nepal), Northeast India (hills) SoutheastTibet (Metok)
- A. n. neophronides Fruhstorfer, 1914 Sikkim, Nepal
- A. n. gratius Fruhstorfer, 1912 Burma (Karens)

== See also ==
- Riodinidae
- List of butterflies of India
- List of butterflies of India (Riodinidae)
